= 2026 Norfolk State Spartans football team =

American college football season

2026 Norfolk State Spartans football
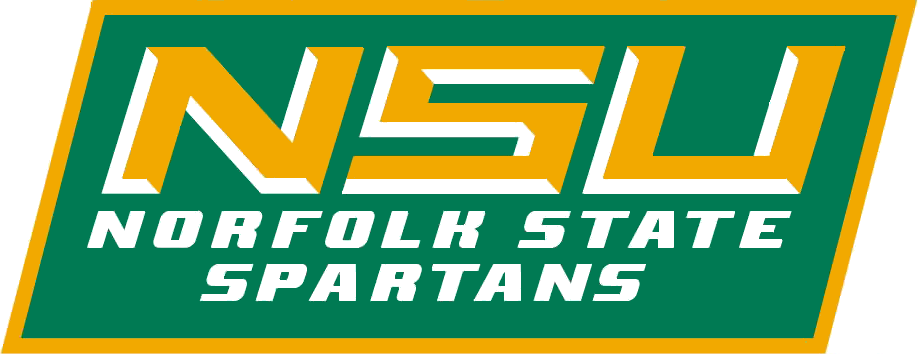
- Conference: Mid-Eastern Athletic Conference
- Record: 5–7 (1–4 MEAC)
- Head coach: Michael Vick (2nd season)
- Offensive coordinator: Brian Sheppard (2nd season)
- Defensive coordinator: Steve Adams (5th season)
- Home stadium: William "Dick" Price Stadium

2026 Mid-Eastern Athletic Conference football standings
	Conf.			Overall
Team	W		L	W		L
No. 20 South Carolina State $	5	–	0	10	–	2
North Carolina Central	4	–	1	6	–	6
Howard	2	–	3	5	–	7
Delaware State	2	–	3	6	–	6
Morgan State	1	–	4	6	–	6
Norfolk State	1	–	4	5	–	7
$ – Conference champion; As of November 22, 2026; Rankings from STATS Poll

The 2026 Norfolk State Spartans football team will represent Norfolk State University as a member of the Mid-Eastern Athletic Conference (MEAC) during the 2026 NCAA Division I FCS football season. The Spartans will be led by second-year head coach Michael Vick and will play their home games at William "Dick" Price Stadium in Norfolk, Virginia.

== Schedule ==
Date	Time	Opponent	Site	TV	Result	Attendance
August 29	6:00 p.m.	Winston-Salem State*	William "Dick" Price Stadium; Norfolk, VA	MEAC Network	W 56–0	15,572
September 5	6:00 p.m.	at Old Dominion*	S.B. Ballard Stadium; Norfolk, VA (rivalry)	ESPN+	L 10–31	21,944
September 11	7:00 p.m.	at No. 25 (FBS) Virginia*	Scott Stadium; Charlottesville, VA	ACCNX	L 3–59	46,918
September 19	4:00 p.m.	Hampton*	William "Dick" Price Stadium; Norfolk, VA (Battle of the Bay)	MEAC Network	W 42–21	17,239
September 26	7:00 p.m.	at Chicago State*	SeatGeek Stadium; Bridgeview, IL		W 43–20	1,543
October 3	2:00 p.m.	at Robert Morris*	Joe Walton Stadium; Moon Township, PA	NEC Front Row	L 31–33	3,001
October 10	2:00 p.m.	VUL*^{†}	William "Dick" Price Stadium; Norfolk, VA	MEAC Network	W 62–0	
October 24	1:30 p.m.	at South Carolina State	Oliver C. Dawson Stadium; Orangeburg, SC	ESPN+	L 7–22	
October 31	2:00 p.m.	vs. Delaware State	Lincoln Financial Field; Philadelphia, PA	ESPN+	L 33–36	32,567
November 7	12:00 p.m.	North Carolina Central	William "Dick" Price Stadium; Norfolk, VA	ESPN+	L 28–29	7,521
November 14	12:00 p.m.	at Morgan State	Hughes Stadium; Baltimore, MD	ESPN+	L 7–17	4,767
November 21	12:00 p.m.	Howard	William "Dick" Price Stadium; Norfolk, VA	ESPN+	W 35–7	3,169
*Non-conference game; ^{†}Homecoming; Rankings from STATS Poll released prior to the game; All times are in Eastern time

== Game summaries ==
=== Winston-Salem State (DII) ===
Winston-Salem State Rams (DII) (0–0) at Norfolk State Spartans (0–0) – Game summary

Quarter	1	2	3	4	Total
Rams (DII)	0	0	0	0	0
Spartans	14	7	14	21	56

at William "Dick" Price Stadium • Norfolk, Virginia

- Date: August 29
- Game time: 6:00 p.m.
- Game weather: Cloudy • Temperature: 82 °F (28 °C) • Wind: NE at 14 miles per hour (23 km/h)
- Game attendance: 15,572
- Referee: Ryan Massey
- TV: MEAC Network

Game information

First quarter

- NORF – Elyjah Mitchell 13-yard pass from Deljay Bailey (Marco Peery kick), 8:52. Spartans 7–0. Drive: 7 plays, 69 yards, 4:36.
- NORF – Deljay Bailey 20-yard run (Marco Peery kick), 1:10. Spartans 14–0. Drive: 10 plays, 76 yards, 4:47.

Second quarter

- NORF – Elyjah Mitchell 10-yard pass from Deljay Bailey (Marco Peery kick), 6:34. Spartans 21–0. Drive: 10 plays, 70 yards, 6:43.

Third quarter

- NORF – Jalyn Daniels 1-yard run (Marco Peery kick), 9:33. Spartans 28–0. Drive: 10 plays, 50 yards, 5:26.
- NORF – Brevin Caldwell 5-yard pass from Deljay Bailey (Marco Peery kick), 0:52. Spartans 35–0. Drive: 12 plays, 85 yards, 6:40.

Fourth quarter

- NORF – Kiron Benjamin 7-yard run (Marco Peery kick), 9:18. Spartans 42–0. Drive: 3 plays, 21 yards, 1:07.
- NORF – Da'Jean Golmond 18-yard run (Marco Peery kick), 7:24. Spartans 49–0. Drive: 3 plays, 26 yards, 1:15.
- NORF – Shamar Vick 1-yard run (Marco Peery kick), 2:07. Spartans 56–0. Drive: 6 plays, 61 yards, 3:22.

Statistics	WNSL	NORF
First downs	10	29
Plays–yards	46–106	69–457
Rushes–yards	22–18	43–306
Passing yards	88	151
Passing: comp–att–int	14–24–1	17–26–0
Turnovers	3	0
Time of possession	22:50	37:10

Team	Category	Player	Statistics
Winston-Salem State	Passing	Kendall Mckoy	14/24, 88 yards, INT
Winston-Salem State	Rushing	Jayvion Danzy	6 carries, 25 yards
Winston-Salem State	Receiving	Taron Biles-Wiker	5 receptions, 69 yards
Norfolk State	Passing	Deljay Bailey	13/20, 119 yards, 3 TD
Norfolk State	Rushing	Jalyn Daniels	15 carries, 104 yards, TD
Norfolk State	Receiving	Elyjah Mitchell	5 receptions, 50 yards, 2 TD

=== at Old Dominion (FBS, rivalry) ===
Norfolk State Spartans (1–0) at Old Dominion Monarchs (FBS) (0–0) – Game summary

Quarter	1	2	3	4	Total
Spartans	0	7	3	0	10
Monarchs (FBS)	7	10	14	0	31

at S.B. Ballard Stadium • Norfolk, Virginia

- Date: September 5
- Game time: 6:00 p.m.
- Game weather: Sunny • Temperature: 83 °F (28 °C)
- Game attendance: 21,944
- Referee: Rory Bernard
- TV announcers (ESPN+): Scott Jackson (play-by-play) and Andy Mashaw (analyst)

Game information

First quarter

- ODU – Quinn Henicle 13-yard run (Nathanial Eichner kick), 4:37. Monarchs 7–0. Drive: 6 plays, 80 yards, 2:48.

Second quarter

- ODU – TJ Johnson 11-yard pass from Quinn Henicle (Nathanial Eichner kick), 13:46. Monarchs 14–0. Drive: 8 plays, 45 yards, 4:02.
- ODU – Nathanial Eichner 37-yard field goal, 3:15. Monarchs 17–0. Drive: 7 plays, 36 yards, 3:00.
- NORF – Deljay Bailey 3-yard run (Marco Peery kick), 0:25. Monarchs 17–7. Drive: 3 plays, 22 yards, 0:52.

Third quarter

- NORF – Marco Peery 37-yard field goal, 9:03. Monarchs 17–10. Drive: 8 plays, 43 yards, 3:51.
- ODU – TJ Johnson 14-yard pass from Quinn Henicle (Nathanial Eichner kick), 4:18. Monarchs 24–10. Drive: 10 plays, 76 yards, 4:40.
- ODU – Quinn Henicle 2-yard run (Nathanial Eichner kick), 0:42. Monarchs 31–10. Drive: 2 plays, 12 yards, 0:53.

Fourth quarter

- No scoring plays.

Statistics	NORF	ODU
First downs	12	16
Plays–yards	60–220	55–319
Rushes–yards	40–126	42–182
Passing yards	94	137
Passing: Comp–Att–Int	14–20–1	9–13–1
Turnovers	3	2
Time of possession	32:19	27:41

Team	Category	Player	Statistics
Norfolk State	Passing	Deljay Bailey	14/20, 94 yards, INT
Norfolk State	Rushing	Jalyn Daniels	11 carries, 84 yards
Norfolk State	Receiving	Paul Billups II	7 receptions, 49 yards
Old Dominion	Passing	Quinn Henicle	9/12, 137 yards, 2 TD, INT
Old Dominion	Rushing	Quinn Henicle	13 carries, 68 yards, 2 TD
Old Dominion	Receiving	Leon Haughton Jr.	2 receptions, 46 yards

=== at No. 25 (FBS) Virginia ===
Norfolk State Spartans (1–1) at No. 25 (FBS) Virginia Cavaliers (1–0) – Game summary

Quarter	1	2	3	4	Total
Spartans	0	3	0	0	3
No. 25 (FBS) Cavaliers	21	7	14	17	59

at Scott Stadium • Charlottesville, Virginia

- Date: September 11
- Game time: 7:00 p.m.
- Game weather: Cloudy • Temperature: 75 °F (24 °C) • Wind: NE 6 mph
- Game attendance: 46,918
- Referee: Ron Hudson
- TV announcers (ACCNX): Doug Sherman and Forrest Conoly

Game information

First quarter

- UVA – Jacquon Gibson 6-yard pass from Beau Pribula (Will Bettridge kick), 7:39. Cavaliers 7–0. Drive: 7 plays, 37 yards, 2:57.
- UVA – Da'Shawn Martin 27-yard pass from Beau Pribula (Will Bettridge kick), 5:30. Cavaliers 14–0. Drive: 1 play, 22 yards, 0:27.
- UVA – Jacquon Gibson 30-yard pass from Beau Pribula (Will Bettridge kick), 3:12. Cavaliers 21–0. Drive: 3 plays, 66 yards, 0:59.

Second quarter

- NORF – Marco Peery 40-yard field goal, 4:05. Cavaliers 21–3. Drive: 5 plays, 15 yards, 2:16.
- UVA – Peyton Lewis 3-yard run (Will Bettridge kick), 1:04. Cavaliers 28–3. Drive: 7 plays, 80 yards, 2:54.

Third quarter

- UVA – Ty'Lyric Coleman 1-yard pass from Eli Holstein (Will Bettridge kick), 10:57. Cavaliers 35–3. Drive: 9 plays, 59 yards, 3:57.
- UVA – Isaiah Robinson 5-yard pass from Eli Holstein (Will Bettridge kick), 7:21. Cavaliers 42–3. Drive: 5 plays, 32 yards, 2:31.

Fourth quarter

- UVA – Hayden Rollison 12-yard pass from Cole Geer (Will Bettridge kick), 14:54. Cavaliers 49–3. Drive: 6 plays, 30 yards, 2:51.
- UVA – Will Bettridge 30-yard field goal, 7:23. Cavaliers 52–3. Drive: 9 plays, 55 yards, 4:09.
- UVA – Justin Rowe 50-yard interception returned (Chris Messmore kick), 4:17. Cavaliers 59–3. Drive: 6 plays, 19 yards, 3:06.

Statistics	NORF	UVA
First downs	11	25
Plays–yards	65–223	62–466
Rushes–yards	31–55	38–237
Passing yards	168	229
Passing: comp–att–int	18–34–3	18–24–1
Turnovers	3	1
Time of possession	31:46	28:14

Team	Category	Player	Statistics
Norfolk State	Passing	Deljay Bailey	15/25, 142 yards, 2 INT
Norfolk State	Rushing	Jalyn Daniels	6 carries, 22 yards
Norfolk State	Receiving	Elyjah Mitchell	5 receptions, 43 yards
Virginia	Passing	Beau Pribula	12/14, 162 yards, 3 TD, INT
Virginia	Rushing	Xay Davis	11 carries, 107 yards
Virginia	Receiving	Jacquon Gibson	2 receptions, 36 yards, 2 TD

=== Hampton (Battle of the Bay) ===
Hampton Pirates (1–2) at Norfolk State Spartans (1–2) – Game summary

Quarter	1	2	3	4	Total
Pirates	0	0	0	0	0
Spartans	0	0	0	0	0

at William "Dick" Price Stadium • Norfolk, Virginia

- Date: September 19
- Game time: 4:00 p.m.
- TV: MEAC Network

Game information

First quarter
Second quarter
Third quarter
Fourth quarter

Statistics	HAMP	NORF
First downs		
Plays–yards		
Rushes–yards		
Passing yards		
Passing: comp–att–int		
Turnovers		
Time of possession		

Team	Category	Player	Statistics
Hampton	Passing		
Hampton	Rushing		
Hampton	Receiving		
Norfolk State	Passing		
Norfolk State	Rushing		
Norfolk State	Receiving		

=== at Chicago State ===
Norfolk State Spartans (2–2) at Chicago State Cougars (1–3) – Game summary

Quarter	1	2	3	4	Total
Spartans	0	0	0	0	0
Cougars	0	0	0	0	0

at SeatGeek Stadium • Bridgeview, Illinois

- Date: September 26
- Game time: 7:00 p.m.

Game information

First quarter
Second quarter
Third quarter
Fourth quarter

Statistics	NORF	CHST
First downs		
Plays–yards		
Rushes–yards		
Passing yards		
Passing: comp–att–int		
Turnovers		
Time of possession		

Team	Category	Player	Statistics
Norfolk State	Passing		
Norfolk State	Rushing		
Norfolk State	Receiving		
Chicago State	Passing		
Chicago State	Rushing		
Chicago State	Receiving		

=== at Robert Morris ===
Norfolk State Spartans (3–2) at Robert Morris Colonials (2–2) – Game summary

Quarter	1	2	3	4	Total
Spartans	0	0	0	0	0
Colonials	0	0	0	0	0

at Joe Walton Stadium • Moon Township, Pennsylvania

- Date: October 3
- Game time: 12:00 p.m.

Game information

First quarter
Second quarter
Third quarter
Fourth quarter

Statistics	NORF	RMU
First downs		
Plays–yards		
Rushes–yards		
Passing yards		
Passing: comp–att–int		
Turnovers		
Time of possession		

Team	Category	Player	Statistics
Norfolk State	Passing		
Norfolk State	Rushing		
Norfolk State	Receiving		
Robert Morris	Passing		
Robert Morris	Rushing		
Robert Morris	Receiving		

=== VUL (NCCAA) ===
VUL Dragons (0–4) at Norfolk State Spartans (3–3) – Game summary

Quarter	1	2	3	4	Total
Dragons (NCCAA)	0	0	0	0	0
Spartans	0	0	0	0	0

at William "Dick" Price Stadium • Norfolk, Virginia

- Date: October 10
- Game time: 2:00 p.m.
- TV: MEAC Network

Game information

First quarter
Second quarter
Third quarter
Fourth quarter

Statistics	VUL	NORF
First downs		
Plays–yards		
Rushes–yards		
Passing yards		
Passing: comp–att–int		
Turnovers		
Time of possession		

Team	Category	Player	Statistics
VUL	Passing		
VUL	Rushing		
VUL	Receiving		
Norfolk State	Passing		
Norfolk State	Rushing		
Norfolk State	Receiving		

=== at South Carolina State ===
Norfolk State Spartans (4–3) at South Carolina State Bulldogs (5–2) – Game summary

Quarter	1	2	3	4	Total
Spartans	0	0	0	0	0
Bulldogs	0	0	0	0	0

at Oliver C. Dawson Stadium • Orangeburg, South Carolina

- Date: October 24
- Game time: 1:30 p.m.

Game information

First quarter
Second quarter
Third quarter
Fourth quarter

Statistics	NORF	SCST
First downs		
Plays–yards		
Rushes–yards		
Passing yards		
Passing: comp–att–int		
Turnovers		
Time of possession		

Team	Category	Player	Statistics
Norfolk State	Passing		
Norfolk State	Rushing		
Norfolk State	Receiving		
South Carolina State	Passing		
South Carolina State	Rushing		
South Carolina State	Receiving		

=== vs. Delaware State ===
Delaware State Hornets (4–4) vs. Norfolk State Spartans (4–4) – Game summary

Quarter	1	2	3	4	Total
Hornets	0	0	0	0	0
Spartans	0	0	0	0	0

at Lincoln Financial Field • Philadelphia, Pennsylvania

- Date: October 31
- Game time: 2:00 p.m.

Game information

First quarter
Second quarter
Third quarter
Fourth quarter

Statistics	DSU	NORF
First downs		
Plays–yards		
Rushes–yards		
Passing yards		
Passing: comp–att–int		
Turnovers		
Time of possession		

Team	Category	Player	Statistics
Delaware State	Passing		
Delaware State	Rushing		
Delaware State	Receiving		
Norfolk State	Passing		
Norfolk State	Rushing		
Norfolk State	Receiving		

=== North Carolina Central ===
North Carolina Central Eagles (4–5) at Norfolk State Spartans (4–5) – Game summary

Quarter	1	2	3	4	Total
Eagles	0	0	0	0	0
Spartans	0	0	0	0	0

at William "Dick" Price Stadium • Norfolk, Virginia

- Date: November 7
- Game time: 12:00 p.m.

Game information

First quarter
Second quarter
Third quarter
Fourth quarter

Statistics	NCCU	NORF
First downs		
Plays–yards		
Rushes–yards		
Passing yards		
Passing: comp–att–int		
Turnovers		
Time of possession		

Team	Category	Player	Statistics
North Carolina Central	Passing		
North Carolina Central	Rushing		
North Carolina Central	Receiving		
Norfolk State	Passing		
Norfolk State	Rushing		
Norfolk State	Receiving		

=== at Morgan State ===
Norfolk State Spartans (4–6) at Morgan State Bears (5–5) – Game summary

Quarter	1	2	3	4	Total
Spartans	0	0	0	0	0
Bears	0	0	0	0	0

at Hughes Stadium • Baltimore, Maryland

- Date: November 14

Game information

First quarter
Second quarter
Third quarter
Fourth quarter

Statistics	NORF	MORG
First downs		
Plays–yards		
Rushes–yards		
Passing yards		
Passing: comp–att–int		
Turnovers		
Time of possession		

Team	Category	Player	Statistics
Norfolk State	Passing		
Norfolk State	Rushing		
Norfolk State	Receiving		
Morgan State	Passing		
Morgan State	Rushing		
Morgan State	Receiving		

=== Howard ===
Howard Bison (5–6) at Norfolk State Spartans (4–7) – Game summary

Quarter	1	2	3	4	Total
Bison	0	0	0	0	0
Spatans	0	0	0	0	0

at William "Dick" Price Stadium • Norfolk, Virginia

- Date: November 21
- Game time: 12:00 p.m.

Game information

First quarter
Second quarter
Third quarter
Fourth quarter

Statistics	HOW	NORF
First downs		
Plays–yards		
Rushes–yards		
Passing yards		
Passing: comp–att–int		
Turnovers		
Time of possession		

Team	Category	Player	Statistics
Howard	Passing		
Howard	Rushing		
Howard	Receiving		
Norfolk State	Passing		
Norfolk State	Rushing		
Norfolk State	Receiving		
