= 2026 Delaware State Hornets football team =

American college football season

2026 Delaware State Hornets football
- Conference: Mid-Eastern Athletic Conference

Ranking
- BCFP: No. 8
- Record: 6–6 (2–3 MEAC)
- Head coach: DeSean Jackson (2nd season)
- Offensive coordinator: Nyema Washington (2nd season)
- Offensive scheme: Pro-style
- Defensive coordinator: Travis Clark (1st season)
- Base defense: Multiple
- Home stadium: Alumni Stadium

2026 Mid-Eastern Athletic Conference football standings
	Conf.			Overall
Team	W		L	W		L
No. 20 South Carolina State $	5	–	0	10	–	2
North Carolina Central	4	–	1	6	–	6
Howard	2	–	3	5	–	7
Delaware State	2	–	3	6	–	6
Morgan State	1	–	4	6	–	6
Norfolk State	1	–	4	5	–	7
$ – Conference champion; As of November 22, 2026; Rankings from STATS Poll

The 2026 Delaware State Hornets football team will represent Delaware State University as a member of the Mid-Eastern Athletic Conference (MEAC) during the 2026 NCAA Division I FCS football season. The Hornets will be led by second-year head coach DeSean Jackson and will play their home games at Alumni Stadium in Dover, Delaware.

== Schedule ==
Date	Time	Opponent	Site	TV	Result	Attendance
August 27	6:00 p.m.	Stony Brook*	Alumni Stadium; Dover, DE	MEAC Network	W 41–34	3,278
September 5	6:00 p.m.	at No. 17 William & Mary*	Zable Stadium; Williamsburg, VA	ESPN+	L 15–22	8,410
September 12	3:00 p.m.	Bowie State*	Alumni Stadium; Dover, DE	MEAC Network	W 21–6	3,507
September 19	7:00 p.m.	at South Florida*	Raymond James Stadium; Tampa, FL	ESPN+	L 17–59	32,345
September 26	6:00 p.m.	Towson*	Alumni Stadium; Dover, DE	MEAC Network	W 33–28	2,578
October 3	3:30 p.m.	at Albany*	Tom & Mary Casey Stadium; Albany, NY	FloFootball	L 3–28	8,500
October 10	1:00 p.m.	Franklin Pierce*	Alumni Stadium; Dover, DE	MEAC Network	W 34–0	
October 23	5:00 p.m.	North Carolina Central	Alumni Stadium; Dover, DE	ESPN2	L 12–31	2,503
October 31	2:00 p.m.	vs. Norfolk State	Lincoln Financial Field; Philadelphia, PA	ESPN+	W 36–33	32,567
November 7	1:00 p.m.	Morgan State	Alumni Stadium; Dover, DE	ESPN+	W 24–14	4,503
November 14	1:00 p.m.	at Howard	William H. Greene Stadium; Washington, D.C.	ESPN+	L 24–30	4,185
November 21	1:30 p.m.	at No. 20 South Carolina State	Oliver C. Dawson Stadium; Orangeburg, SC	ESPN+	L 16–26	6,875
*Non-conference game; Rankings from STATS Poll released prior to the game; All times are in Eastern time

== Game summaries ==
=== Stony Brook ===
Stony Brook Seawolves (0–0) at Delaware State Hornets (0–0) – Game summary

Quarter	1	2	3	4	Total
Seawolves	6	7	14	7	34
Hornets	10	14	10	7	41

at Alumni Stadium • Dover, DE

- Date: August 27
- Game time: 6:00 p.m.
- Game weather: Cloudy • Temperature: 85 °F (29 °C) • Wind: SE at 6 miles per hour (9.7 km/h)
- Game attendance: 3,278
- Referee: Jason Soistman
- TV: MEAC Network

Game information

First quarter

- STBK – DJ Linkins 34-yard pass from Quinn Boyd (Jacob Kirenbring kick failed), 10:27. Seawolves 6–0. Drive: 4 plays, 46 yards, 0:37.
- DSU – Jaylin Terzado 72-yard pass from Ui Ale (Patrick Fisher-Butler kick), 9:21. Hornets 7–6. Drive: 3 plays, 72 yards, 0:59.
- DSU – Patrick Fisher-Butler 41-yard field goal, 1:22. Hornets 10–6. Drive: 12 plays, 51 yards, 6:12.

Second quarter

- DSU – Samari Collier 59-yard run (Patrick Fisher-Butler kick), 13:21. Hornets 17–6. Drive: 4 plays, 71 yards, 1:33.
- DSU – Ui Ale 16-yard run (Patrick Fisher-Butler kick), 10:41. Hornets 24–6. Drive: 2 plays, 18 yards, 0:42.
- STBK – Quinn Boyd 10-yard run (Jacob Krienbring kick), 5:57. Hornets 24–13. Drive: 10 plays, 75 yards, 4:44.

Third quarter

- DSU – Jayden Jenkins 19-yard run (Patrick Fisher-Butler kick), 10:15. Hornets 31–13. Drive: 4 plays, 67 yards, 1:46.
- STBK – Seth Sweitzer 13-yard pass from Quinn Boyd (Jacob Krienbring kick), 6:40. Hornets 31–20. Drive: 9 plays, 66 yards, 3:29.
- DSU – Patrick Fisher-Butler 52-yard field goal, 3:43. Hornets 34–20. Drive: 7 plays, 31 yards, 2:57.
- STBK – CJ Hester 2-yard run (Jacob Krienbring kick), 1:02. Hornets 34–27. Drive: 6 plays, 75 yards, 2:41.

Fourth quarter

- STBK – Keiden Gutierrez 9-yard pass from Quinn Boyd (Jacob Krienbring kick), 11:25. Tied 34–34. Drive: 7 plays, 31 yards, 2:33.
- DSU – Sean Weston Jr. 16-yard run (Patrick Fisher-Butler kick), 1:54. Hornets 41–34. Drive: 11 plays, 80 yards, 5:42.

Statistics	STBK	DSU
First downs	25	20
Plays–yards	76–456	71–514
Rushes–yards	35–133	41–255
Passing yards	323	259
Passing: Comp–Att–Int	22–41–1	18–30–0
Turnovers	2	0
Time of possession	27:56	32:04

Team	Category	Player	Statistics
Stony Brook	Passing	Quinn Boyd	22/41, 323 yards, 3 TD, INT
Stony Brook	Rushing	CJ Hester	18 carries, 91 yards, TD
Stony Brook	Receiving	Seth Sweitzer	5 receptions, 81 yards, TD
Delaware State	Passing	Ui Ale	18/29, 259 yards, TD
Delaware State	Rushing	Ui Ale	8 carries, 82 yards, TD
Delaware State	Receiving	Jaylin Terzado	6 receptions, 149 yards, TD

=== at No. 17 William & Mary ===
Delaware State Hornets (1–0) at No. 17 William & Mary Tribe (1–0) – Game summary

Quarter	1	2	3	4	Total
Hornets	0	0	0	15	15
No. 17 Tribe	16	0	3	3	22

at Zable Stadium • Williamsburg, Virginia

- Date: September 5
- Game time: 6:00 p.m.
- Game weather: Cloudy • Temperature: 80 °F (27 °C)
- Game attendance: 8,410
- Referee: Travis Barta
- TV: ESPN+

Game information

First quarter

- W&M – Max Lipinski 25-yard field goal, 10:22. Tribe 3–0. Drive: 6 plays, 63 yards, 2:58.
- W&M – Andrew King 14-yard run (Max Lipinski kick), 7:52. Tribe 10–0. Drive: 2 plays, 19 yards, 0:38.
- W&M – Andrew King 3-yard run (run failed), 5:44. Tribe 16–0. Drive: 4 plays, 26 yards, 1:15.

Second quarter

- No scoring plays.

Third quarter

- W&M – Max Lipinski 32-yard field goal, 9:00. Tribe 19–0. Drive: 12 plays, 54 yards, 6:00.

Fourth quarter

- W&M – Max Lipinski 51-yard field goal, 12:20. Tribe 22–0. Drive: 4 plays, -8 yards, 1:59.
- DSU – Noah Brannock 11-yard run (Jaron Kelley run), 9:59. Tribe 22–8. Drive: 6 plays, 65 yards, 2:21.
- DSU – Noah Brannock 2-yard run (Patrick Fisher-Butler kick), 3:04. Tribe 22–15. Drive: 7 plays, 69 yards, 2:54.

Statistics	DSU	W&M
First downs	26	10
Plays–yards	75–366	54–187
Rushes–yards	33–174	39–89
Passing yards	192	98
Passing: comp–att–int	21–42–3	7–15–0
Turnovers	6	1
Time of possession	33:27	26:33

Team	Category	Player	Statistics
Delaware State	Passing	Ui Ale	15/31, 138 yards, 2 INT
Delaware State	Rushing	Jayden Jenkins	10 carries, 57 yards
Delaware State	Receiving	Terrence Rone	3 receptions, 42 yards
William & Mary	Passing	Winston Watkins	6/12, 95 yards
William & Mary	Rushing	Andrew King	15 carries, 73 yards, 2 TD
William & Mary	Receiving	Khylil Johnson	4 receptions, 83 yards

=== Bowie State (DII) ===
Bowie State Bulldogs (DII) (0–1) at Delaware State Hornets (1–1) – Game summary

Quarter	1	2	3	4	Total
Bulldogs (DII)	0	0	6	0	6
Hornets	7	0	14	0	21

at Alumni Stadium • Dover, Delaware

- Date: September 12
- Game time: 3:00 p.m.
- Game weather: Sunny • Temperature: 81 °F (27 °C) • Wind: SE at 12 miles per hour (19 km/h)
- Game attendance: 3,507
- Referee: Javarro Edward
- TV: MEAC Network

Game information

First quarter

- (9:58) DSU – Shaun Boykins Jr. 6-yard run, Patrick Fisher-Butler kick (Drive: 6 plays, 57 yards, 2:12; Delaware State 7–0)

Second quarter

No scoring plays

Third quarter

- (11:19) BOW – Konner Blount-Foster 31-yard pass from Kyle Hawkins (Drive: 5 plays, 55 yards, 1:56; Delaware State 7–6)
- (6:17) DSU – Shaun Boykins Jr. 18-yard run, Maatteo Bracalenti kick (Drive: 10 plays, 75 yards, 4:56; Delaware State 14–6)
- (1:53) DSU – Ui Ale 10-yard run, Patrick Fisher-Butler kick (Drive: 3 plays, 42 yards, 1:12; Delaware State 21–6)

Fourth quarter

No scoring plays

Statistics	BOW	DSU
First downs	19	19
Plays–yards	63–287	57–391
Rushes–yards	43–127	31–224
Passing yards	160	167
Passing: comp–att–int	13–20–1	18–26–1
Turnovers	2	1
Time of possession	33:48	26:12

Team	Category	Player	Statistics
Bowie State	Passing	Jaylin Solomon	11/18, 108 yards, INT
Bowie State	Rushing	Daniel Coles Jr.	11 carries, 45 yards
Bowie State	Receiving	John Thompson	3 receptions, 56 yards
Delaware State	Passing	Ui Ale	11/16, 133 yards, INT
Delaware State	Rushing	Shaun Boykins Jr.	10 carries, 87 yards, 2 TD
Delaware State	Receiving	Jordan Banks	2 receptions, 54 yards

=== at South Florida (FBS) ===
Delaware State Hornets (2–1) at South Florida Bulls (FBS) (2–0) – Game summary

Quarter	1	2	3	4	Total
Hornets	7	10	0	0	17
Bulls (FBS)	14	14	14	17	59

at Raymond James Stadium • Tampa, Florida

- Date: September 19
- Game time: 7:00 p.m.
- Game weather: Rain • Temperature: 90 °F (32 °C)
- Game attendance: 32,345
- Referee: Steven Anderson
- TV announcers (ESPN+): TJ Rives (play-by-play) and Henry Burris (analyst)

Game information

First quarter

- (13:40) USF – D.J. Crowther 10-yard run, Nico Gramatica kick (Drive: 4 plays, 72 yards, 1:13; South Florida 7–0)
- (4:47) DSU – Nathan Stewart 90-yard pass from Ui Ale, Patrick Fisher-Butler kick (Drive: 1 play, 90 yards, 0:12; South Florida 7–7)
- (2:56) USF – D.J. Crowther 38-yard run, Nico Gramatica kick (Drive: 4 plays, 75 yards, 1:51; South Florida 14–7)

Second quarter

- (8:17) USF – Luke Kromenhoek 10-yard run, Nico Gramatica kick (Drive: 7 plays, 41 yards, 3:18; South Florida 21–7)
- (4:00) DSU – Patrick Fisher-Butler 23-yard field goal (Drive: 8 plays, 84 yards, 4:16; South Florida 21–10)
- (1:18) DSU – Jaylin Terzado 20-yard pass from Ui Ale, Patrick Fisher-Butler kick (Drive: 5 plays, 48 yards, 1:38; South Florida 21–17)
- (0:00) USF – Luke Kromenhoek 1-yard run, Nico Gramatica kick (Drive: 10 plays, 72 yards, 1:12; South Florida 28–17)

Third quarter

- (10:39) USF – D.J. Crowther 39-yard run, Nico Gramatica kick (Drive: 4 plays, 61 yards, 1:24; South Florida 35–17)
- (3:18) USF – Jason Collins Jr. 5-yard run, Nico Gramatica kick (Drive: 8 plays, 75 yards, 4:54; South Florida 42–17)

Fourth quarter

- (13:02) USF – Joshua Porter 5-yard pass from Michael Van Buren Jr., Nico Gramatica kick (Drive: 3 plays, 56 yards, 2:51; South Florida 49–17)
- (3:18) USF – Chase Garnett. 45-yard run, Nico Gramatica kick (Drive: 3 plays, 56 yards, 1:50; South Florida 56–17)
- (1:51) USF – Nico Gramatica 20-yard field goal (Drive: 9 plays, 73 yards, 4:58; South Florida 59–17)

Statistics	DSU	USF
First downs	17	33
Plays–yards	58–353	66–611
Rushes–yards	31–103	31–290
Passing yards	250	321
Passing: comp–att–int	17–27–0	25–35–0
Turnovers	1	1
Time of possession	31:21	28:39

Team	Category	Player	Statistics
Delaware State	Passing	Ui Ale	16/22, 249 Yards
Delaware State	Rushing	Ui Ale	4 Carries, 49 Yards
Delaware State	Receiving	Nathan Stewart	2 Receptions, 102 Yards, 1 TD
South Florida	Passing	Michael Van Buren Jr.	23/32, 300 Yards
South Florida	Rushing	D.J. Crowther	8 Carries, 101 Yards, 3 TD
South Florida	Receiving	Joshua Porter	8 Receptions, 106 Yards, 1 TD

=== Towson ===
Towson Tigers (0–4) at Delaware State Hornets (2–2) – Game summary

Quarter	1	2	3	4	Total
Tigers	0	0	0	0	0
Hornets	0	0	0	0	0

at Alumni Stadium • Dover, Delaware

- Date: September 26
- Game time: 6:00 p.m.
- TV: MEAC Network

Game information

First quarter
Second quarter
Third quarter
Fourth quarter

Statistics	TOW	DSU
First downs		
Plays–yards		
Rushes–yards		
Passing yards		
Passing: comp–att–int		
Turnovers		
Time of possession		

Team	Category	Player	Statistics
Towson	Passing		
Towson	Rushing		
Towson	Receiving		
Delaware State	Passing		
Delaware State	Rushing		
Delaware State	Receiving		

=== at Albany ===
Delaware State Hornets (3–2) at Albany Great Danes (2–3) – Game summary

Quarter	1	2	3	4	Total
Hornets	0	0	0	0	0
Great Danes	0	0	0	0	0

at Tom & Mary Casey Stadium • Albany, New York

- Date: October 3
- Game time: 3:30 p.m.

Game information

First quarter
Second quarter
Third quarter
Fourth quarter

Statistics	DSU	ALB
First downs		
Plays–yards		
Rushes–yards		
Passing yards		
Passing: comp–att–int		
Turnovers		
Time of possession		

Team	Category	Player	Statistics
Delaware State	Passing		
Delaware State	Rushing		
Delaware State	Receiving		
Albany	Passing		
Albany	Rushing		
Albany	Receiving		

=== Franklin Pierce (DII) ===
Franklin Pierce Ravens (3–1) at Delaware State Hornets (3–3) – Game summary

Quarter	1	2	3	4	Total
Ravens (DII)	0	0	0	0	0
Hornets	0	0	0	0	0

at Alumni Stadium • Dover, Delaware

- Date: October 10
- Game time: 1:00 p.m.
- TV: MEAC Network

Game information

First quarter
Second quarter
Third quarter
Fourth quarter

Statistics	FP	DSU
First downs		
Plays–yards		
Rushes–yards		
Passing yards		
Passing: comp–att–int		
Turnovers		
Time of possession		

Team	Category	Player	Statistics
Franklin Pierce	Passing		
Franklin Pierce	Rushing		
Franklin Pierce	Receiving		
Delaware State	Passing		
Delaware State	Rushing		
Delaware State	Receiving		

=== North Carolina Central ===
North Carolina Central Eagles (2–5) at Delaware State Hornets (4–3) – Game summary

Quarter	1	2	3	4	Total
Eagles	0	0	0	0	0
Hornets	0	0	0	0	0

at Alumni Stadium • Dover, Delaware

- Date: October 23
- Game time: 5:00 p.m.

Game information

First quarter
Second quarter
Third quarter
Fourth quarter

Statistics	NCCU	DSU
First downs		
Plays–yards		
Rushes–yards		
Passing yards		
Passing: comp–att–int		
Turnovers		
Time of possession		

Team	Category	Player	Statistics
North Carolina Central	Passing		
North Carolina Central	Rushing		
North Carolina Central	Receiving		
Delaware State	Passing		
Delaware State	Rushing		
Delaware State	Receiving		

=== vs. Norfolk State ===
Delaware State Hornets (4–4) vs. Norfolk State Spartans (4–4) – Game summary

Quarter	1	2	3	4	Total
Hornets	0	0	0	0	0
Spartans	0	0	0	0	0

at Lincoln Financial Field • Philadelphia, Pennsylvania

- Date: October 31
- Game time: 2:00 p.m.

Game information

First quarter
Second quarter
Third quarter
Fourth quarter

Statistics	DSU	NORF
First downs		
Plays–yards		
Rushes–yards		
Passing yards		
Passing: comp–att–int		
Turnovers		
Time of possession		

Team	Category	Player	Statistics
Delaware State	Passing		
Delaware State	Rushing		
Delaware State	Receiving		
Norfolk State	Passing		
Norfolk State	Rushing		
Norfolk State	Receiving		

=== Morgan State ===
Morgan State Bears (5–4) at Delaware State Hornets (5–4) – Game summary

Quarter	1	2	3	4	Total
Bears	0	0	0	0	0
Hornets	0	0	0	0	0

at Alumni Stadium • Dover, Delaware

- Date: November 7
- Game time: 1:00 p.m.

Game information

First quarter
Second quarter
Third quarter
Fourth quarter

Statistics	MORG	DSU
First downs		
Plays–yards		
Rushes–yards		
Passing yards		
Passing: comp–att–int		
Turnovers		
Time of possession		

Team	Category	Player	Statistics
Morgan State	Passing		
Morgan State	Rushing		
Morgan State	Receiving		
Delaware State	Passing		
Delaware State	Rushing		
Delaware State	Receiving		

=== at Howard ===
Delaware State Hornets (6–4) at Howard Bison (4–6) – Game summary

Quarter	1	2	3	4	Total
Hornets	0	0	0	0	0
Bison	0	0	0	0	0

at William H. Greene Stadium • Washington, DC

- Date: November 14

Game information

First quarter
Second quarter
Third quarter
Fourth quarter

Statistics	DSU	HOW
First downs		
Plays–yards		
Rushes–yards		
Passing yards		
Passing: comp–att–int		
Turnovers		
Time of possession		

Team	Category	Player	Statistics
Delaware State	Passing		
Delaware State	Rushing		
Delaware State	Receiving		
Howard	Passing		
Howard	Rushing		
Howard	Receiving		

=== at No. 20 South Carolina State ===
Delaware State Hornets (6–5) at No. 20 South Carolina State Bulldogs (9–2) – Game summary

Quarter	1	2	3	4	Total
Hornets	0	0	0	0	0
No. 20 Bulldogs	0	0	0	0	0

at Oliver C. Dawson Stadium • Orangeburg, South Carolina

- Date: November 21
- Game time: 1:30 p.m.

Game information

First quarter
Second quarter
Third quarter
Fourth quarter

Statistics	DSU	SCST
First downs		
Plays–yards		
Rushes–yards		
Passing yards		
Passing: comp–att–int		
Turnovers		
Time of possession		

Team	Category	Player	Statistics
Delaware State	Passing		
Delaware State	Rushing		
Delaware State	Receiving		
South Carolina State	Passing		
South Carolina State	Rushing		
South Carolina State	Receiving		
