= 2026 William & Mary Tribe football team =

American college football season

2026 William & Mary Tribe football
- Conference: Patriot League
- Record: 4–8 (2–7 Patriot)
- Head coach: Mike London (8th season)
- Offensive coordinator: Winston October (2nd season)
- Co-defensive coordinators: Ras-I Dowling (4th season); Bo Revell (4th season)
- Home stadium: Zable Stadium

2026 Patriot League football standings
	Conf.			Overall
Team	W		L	W		L
No. 16 Lehigh $^	8	–	1	10	–	2
Holy Cross	7	–	2	7	–	5
Colgate	6	–	3	7	–	5
Villanova	6	–	3	7	–	5
Richmond	5	–	4	7	–	5
Fordham	4	–	5	4	–	8
Lafayette	3	–	5	4	–	7
Georgetown	3	–	5	3	–	7
William & Mary	2	–	7	4	–	8
Bucknell	0	–	9	1	–	11
$ – Conference champion; ^ – FCS playoff participant; As of November 22, 2026; Rankings from STATS Poll

The 2026 William & Mary Tribe football team represents the College of William & Mary as a member of the Patriot League during the 2026 NCAA Division I FCS football season. This is the Tribe's first season in the Patriot after twenty seasons in the CAA.

The Tribe are led by eighth-year head coach Mike London and play their home games at Zable Stadium.

== Schedule ==
Date	Time	Opponent	Rank	Site	TV	Result	Attendance
August 28	6:00 p.m.	at No. 8 Villanova		Villanova Stadium; Villanova, PA	ESPN+	W 35–32	5,221
September 5	6:00 p.m.	Delaware State*	No. 17	Zable Stadium; Williamsburg, VA	ESPN+	W 22–15	8,410
September 12	2:00 p.m.	at No. 9 Lehigh	No. 16	Goodman Stadium; Lower Saucon, PA	ESPN+	L 20–44	5,240
September 19	6:00 p.m.	Fordham	No. 21	Zable Stadium; Williamsburg, VA	ESPN	L 27–52	11,743
September 26	3:30 p.m.	at Duke*		Wallace Wade Stadium; Durham, NC	ACCNX	L 7–62	22,003
October 3	3:30 p.m.	Holy Cross		Zable Stadium; Williamsburg, VA	ESPN+	L 14–41	8,367
October 10	1:00 p.m.	at North Carolina Central*		O'Kelly–Riddick Stadium; Durham, NC	ESPN+	W 17–14	11,735
October 24	3:30 p.m.	Georgetown^{†}		Zable Stadium; Williamsburg, VA	ESPN+	L 27–28	12,369
October 31	1:00 p.m.	at Colgate		Andy Kerr Stadium; Hamilton, NY	ESPN+	L 0–37	1,635
November 7	1:00 p.m.	Lafayette		Zable Stadium; Williamsburg, VA	ESPN+	L 14–19	10,006
November 14	1:00 p.m.	Bucknell		Zable Stadium; Williamsburg, VA	ESPN+	W 41–24	8,734
November 21	12:00 p.m.	at Richmond		E. Claiborne Robins Stadium; Richmond, VA (Capital Cup)	ESPN+	L 16–17	6,195
*Non-conference game; ^{†}Homecoming; Rankings from STATS Poll released prior to the game; All times are in Eastern time

== Game summaries ==
=== at No. 8 Villanova ===
William & Mary Tribe (0–0) at No. 8 Villanova Wildcats (0–0) – Game summary

Quarter	1	2	3	4	Total
Tribe	7	3	9	16	35
No. 8 Wildcats	7	10	0	15	32

at Villanova Stadium • Villanova, Pennsylvania

- Date: August 28
- Game time: 6:00 p.m.
- Game weather: Sunny • Wind: NW at 6 miles per hour (9.7 km/h)
- Game attendance: 5,221
- Referee: Anthony Florio
- TV announcers (ESPN+): Roxy Bernstein, Steve Pinone and Tessa Peloso

Game information

First quarter

- VILL – Isaiah Ragland 5-yard run (Dominic LeBlanc kick), 7:52. Wildcats 7–0. Drive: 11 plays, 75 yards, 7:08.
- W&M – Carson Jenkins 68-yard pass from Winston Watkins (Max Lipinski kick), 5:55. Tied 7–7. Drive: 4 plays, 81 yards, 1:48.

Second quarter

- W&M – Max Lipinski 22-yard field goal, 6:12. Tribe 10–7. Drive: 10 plays, 73 yards, 5:12.
- VILL – Ja'briel Mace 11-yard run (Dominic LeBlanc kick), 1:21. Wildcats 14–10. Drive: 7 plays, 63 yards, 2:37.
- VILL – Dominic LeBlanc 42-yard field goal, 0:00. Wildcats 17–10. Drive: 4 plays, 40 yards, 0:21.

Third quarter

- W&M – Max Lipinski 39-yard field goal, 8:08. Wildcats 17–13. Drive: 14 plays, 54 yards, 6:43.
- W&M – Winston Watkins 1-yard run (Max Lipinski kick failed), 5:26. Tribe 19–17. Drive: 4 plays, 45 yards, 5:21.

Fourth quarter

- W&M – Max Lipinski 41-yard field goal, 9:18. Tribe 22–17. Drive: 13 plays, 46 yards, 5:21.
- VILL – Brandon Binkowski 8-yard pass from Pat McQuaide (Pat McQuaide–Jake Hilton pass), 3:47. Wildcats 25–22. Drive: 7 plays, 32 yards, 2:30.
- VILL – Isaiah Ragland 37-yard run (Dominic LeBlanc kick), 2:43. Wildcats 32–22. Drive: 1 play, 37 yards, 0:10.
- W&M – Max Lipinski 40-yard field goal, 0:53. Wildcats 32–25. Drive: 12 plays, 52 yards, 1:50.
- W&M – Kai Austin 37-yard pass from Winston Watkins (Max Lipinski kick), 0:22. Tied 32–32. Drive: 3 plays, 39 yards, 0:28.
- W&M – Max Lipinski 45-yard field goal, 0:00. Tribe 35–32. Drive: 1 play, 0 yards, 0:05.

Statistics	W&M	VILL
First downs	21	20
Plays–yards	77–393	60–427
Rushes–yards	41–130	30–157
Passing yards	263	270
Passing: comp–att–int	20–36–1	17–30–3
Turnovers	1	4
Time of possession	31:59	28:01

Team	Category	Player	Statistics
William & Mary	Passing	Winston Watkins	19/33, 254 yards, 2 TD, INT
William & Mary	Rushing	Winston Watkins	21 carries, 72 yards, TD
William & Mary	Receiving	Kai Austin	4 receptions, 76 yards, TD
Villanova	Passing	Pat McQuaide	17/30, 270 yards, TD, 3 INT
Villanova	Rushing	Isaiah Ragland	14 carries, 94 yards, 2 TD
Villanova	Receiving	Jake Hilton	4 receptions, 132 yards

In the season opener for both teams, the unranked William & Mary Tribe played the No. 7-ranked Villanova Wildcats at Villanova Stadium. Villanova entered the game favored to win by 11.5 points. With 55 seconds remaining in the fourth quarter, Villanova led William & Mary 32–22. A 40-yard field goal by Max Lipinski narrowed Villanova's lead to seven points with 53 seconds remaining. A successful onside kick allowed William & Mary to resume possession at Villanova's 39-yard line. A 37-yard pass by the quarterback Winston Watkins to the receiver Kai Austin scored a touchdown for William & Mary with 22 seconds left. The successful conversion tied the game. Villanova's quarterback Pat McQuaide them threw his third interception of the game, which was caught by Cade Ellis with five seconds remaining. Lipinski scored a 45-yard field goal, ending the game 35–32 in what the ESPN announcer Michael Marcantonini called an "absolute thriller". Following their win, William & Mary was ranked No. 17 in Stats Perform's FCS Top 25 Poll and No. 19 in the AFCA's AFCA FCS Coaches Top 25 Poll.

=== Delaware State ===
Delaware State Hornets (1–0) at No. 17 William & Mary Tribe (1–0) – Game summary

Quarter	1	2	3	4	Total
Hornets	0	0	0	15	15
No. 17 Tribe	16	0	3	3	22

at Zable Stadium • Williamsburg, Virginia

- Date: September 5
- Game time: 6:00 p.m.
- Game weather: Cloudy • Temperature: 80 °F (27 °C)
- Game attendance: 8,410
- Referee: Travis Barta
- TV: ESPN+

Game information

First quarter

- W&M – Max Lipinski 25-yard field goal, 10:22. Tribe 3–0. Drive: 6 plays, 63 yards, 2:58.
- W&M – Andrew King 14-yard run (Max Lipinski kick), 7:52. Tribe 10–0. Drive: 2 plays, 19 yards, 0:38.
- W&M – Andrew King 3-yard run (run failed), 5:44. Tribe 16–0. Drive: 4 plays, 26 yards, 1:15.

Second quarter

- No scoring plays.

Third quarter

- W&M – Max Lipinski 32-yard field goal, 9:00. Tribe 19–0. Drive: 12 plays, 54 yards, 6:00.

Fourth quarter

- W&M – Max Lipinski 51-yard field goal, 12:20. Tribe 22–0. Drive: 4 plays, -8 yards, 1:59.
- DSU – Noah Brannock 11-yard run (Jaron Kelley run), 9:59. Tribe 22–8. Drive: 6 plays, 65 yards, 2:21.
- DSU – Noah Brannock 2-yard run (Patrick Fisher-Butler kick), 3:04. Tribe 22–15. Drive: 7 plays, 69 yards, 2:54.

Statistics	DSU	W&M
First downs	26	10
Plays–yards	75–366	54–187
Rushes–yards	33–174	39–89
Passing yards	192	98
Passing: comp–att–int	21–42–3	7–15–0
Turnovers	6	1
Time of possession	33:27	26:33

Team	Category	Player	Statistics
Delaware State	Passing	Ui Ale	15/31, 138 yards, 2 INT
Delaware State	Rushing	Jayden Jenkins	10 carries, 57 yards
Delaware State	Receiving	Terrence Rone	3 receptions, 42 yards
William & Mary	Passing	Winston Watkins	6/12, 95 yards
William & Mary	Rushing	Andrew King	15 carries, 73 yards, 2 TD
William & Mary	Receiving	Khylil Johnson	4 receptions, 83 yards

=== at No. 9 Lehigh ===
No. 16 William & Mary Tribe (2–0) at No. 9 Lehigh Mountain Hawks (2–0) – Game summary

Quarter	1	2	3	4	Total
No. 16 Tribe	0	7	0	13	20
No. 9 Mountain Hawks	16	21	0	7	44

at Goodman Stadium • Lower Saucon Township, Pennsylvania

- Date: September 12
- Game time: 2:00 p.m.
- Game weather: Sunny
- Game attendance: 5,240
- Referee: Cory Hanson
- TV announcers (ESPN+): Marco Socci and Lance Haynes

Game information

First quarter

- LEH – Luke Yoder 1-yard run (Connor Poole kick), 12:26. Mountain Hawks 7–0. Drive: 4 plays, 69 yards, 2:08.
- LEH – Team safety, 11:56. Mountain Hawks 9–0.
- LEH – Luke Yoder 2-yard run (Connor Poole kick), 1:40. Mountain Hawks 16–0. Drive: 9 plays, 85 yards, 5:19.

Second quarter

- LEH – Nick Palumbo 22-yard pass from Derek Morgan (Connor Poole kick), 11:45. Mountain Hawks 23–0. Drive: 5 plays, 65 yards, 2:48.
- LEH – Johnson,Hayden 50-yard run (Connor Poole kick), 9:08. Mountain Hawks 30–0. Drive: 3 plays, 58 yards, 1:27.
- W&M – Jah'Kei Chavis 4-yard run (Max Lipinski kick), 1:54. Mountain Hawks 30–7. Drive: 4 plays, 74 yards, 1:45.
- LEH – Derek Morgan 8-yard run (Connor Poole kick), 0:02. Mountain Hawks 37–7. Drive: 9 plays, 75 yards, 1:52.

Third quarter

- No scoring plays.

Fourth quarter

- W&M – Jah'Kei Chavis 1-yard run (Max Lipinski kick), 13:01. Mountain Hawks 37–14. Drive: 10 plays, 75 yards, 4:32.
- LEH – Luke Yoder 11-yard run (Connor Poole kick), 8:35. Mountain Hawks 44–14. Drive: 7 plays, 75 yards, 4:26.
- W&M – Winston Watkins 1-yard run (pass failed), 2:42. Mountain Hawks 44–20. Drive: 16 plays, 79 yards, 5:48.

Statistics	W&M	LEH
First downs	19	25
Plays–yards	73–342	61–486
Rushes–yards	34–144	51–366
Passing yards	198	120
Passing: comp–att–int	25–39–1	7–10–0
Turnovers	2	1
Time of possession	27:42	32:18

Team	Category	Player	Statistics
William & Mary	Passing	Winston Watkins	18/22, 164 yards
William & Mary	Rushing	Andrew King	11 carries, 78 yards
William & Mary	Receiving	Kai Austin	10 receptions, 82 yards
Lehigh	Passing	Hayden Johnson	4/6, 84 yards
Lehigh	Rushing	Luke Yoder	23 carries, 169 yards, 3 TD
Lehigh	Receiving	Nick Palumbo	3 receptions, 71 yards, TD

=== Fordham ===
Fordham Rams (0–3) at No. 21 William & Mary Tribe (2–1) – Game summary

Quarter	1	2	3	4	Total
Rams	14	14	10	14	52
No. 21 Tribe	0	7	7	13	27

at Zable Stadium • Williamsburg, Virginia

- Date: September 19
- Game time: 6:00 p.m.
- Game weather: Sunny • Temperature: 78 °F (26 °C)
- Game attendance: 11,743
- Referee: Bill McKeever
- TV announcers (ESPN+): Jay Colley and Gareth Hissong

Game information

First quarter

- FOR – KJ Reed 18-yard pass from Gunnar Smith (Bennett Henderson kick), 6:58. Rams 7–0. Drive: 8 plays, 84 yards, 2:46.
- FOR – Jamell James 5-yard run (Bennett Henderson kick), 1:02. Rams 14–0. Drive: 5 plays, 29 yards, 2:23.

Second quarter

- FOR – John Morris 10-yard pass from Gunnar Smith (Bennett Henderson kick), 14:54. Rams 21–0. Drive: 3 plays, 20 yards, 1:02.
- W&M – Andrew King 67-yard run (Max Lipinski kick), 14:09. Rams 21–7. Drive: 2 plays, 76 yards, 0:39.
- FOR – Nodin Tracy 14-yard pass from Gunnar Smith (Bennett Henderson kick), 0:32. Rams 28–7. Drive: 9 plays, 64 yards, 4:30.

Third quarter

- FOR – Bennett Henderson 19-yard field goal, 10:12. Rams 31–7. Drive: 8 plays, 70 yards, 3:43.
- W&M – Jacob Mullins 16-yard pass from Winston Watkins (Max Lipinski kick), 4:07. Rams 31–14. Drive: 14 plays, 84 yards, 6:00.
- FOR – Jamell James 12-yard run (Bennett Henderson kick), 2:44. Rams 38–14. Drive: 3 plays, 75 yards, 1:23.

Fourth quarter

- W&M – Kai Austin 27-yard pass from Winston Watkins (pass failed), 14:52. Rams 38–20. Drive: 8 plays, 75 yards, 2:52.
- FOR – Yohan-Li Louis 57-yard run (Bennett Henderson kick), 11:52. Rams 45–20. Drive: 5 plays, 75 yards, 3:00.
- FOR – Jamell James 10-yard run (Bennett Henderson kick), 3:26. Rams 52–20. Drive: 7 plays, 58 yards, 3:52.
- W&M – Patrick Blee 1-yard run (Max Lipinski kick), 1:16. Rams 52–27. Drive: 7 plays, 75 yards, 2:10.

Statistics	FOR	W&M
First downs	27	20
Plays–yards	67–569	66–423
Rushes–yards	46–428	40–137
Passing yards	141	286
Passing: comp–att–int	12–21–0	19–26–0
Turnovers	0	2
Time of possession	34:13	25:17

Team	Category	Player	Statistics
Fordham	Passing	Gunnar Smith	12/21, 141 yards, 3 TD
Fordham	Rushing	Yohan-Li Louis	15 carries, 203 yards, TD
Fordham	Receiving	Ricky Gonzalez II	2 receptions, 41 yards
William & Mary	Passing	Winston Watkins	19/26, 286 yards, 2 TD
William & Mary	Rushing	Andrew King	16 carries, 122 yards, TD
William & Mary	Receiving	Kai Austin	6 receptions, 81 yards, TD

=== at Duke (FBS) ===
William & Mary Tribe (2–2) at Duke Blue Devils (3–0) – Game summary

Quarter	1	2	3	4	Total
Tribe	0	0	0	0	0
Blue Devils (FBS)	0	0	0	0	0

at Wallace Wade Stadium • Durham, North Carolina

- Date: September 26
- Game time: 3:30 p.m.
- TV announcers (ACCNX): Kevin Fitzgerald and Jeff Woody

Game information

First quarter
Second quarter
Third quarter
Fourth quarter

Statistics	W&M	DUKE
First downs		
Plays–yards		
Rushes–yards		
Passing yards		
Passing: comp–att–int		
Turnovers		
Time of possession		

Team	Category	Player	Statistics
William & Mary	Passing		
William & Mary	Rushing		
William & Mary	Receiving		
Duke	Passing		
Duke	Rushing		
Duke	Receiving		

=== Holy Cross ===
Holy Cross Crusaders (1–4) at William & Mary Tribe (2–3) – Game summary

Quarter	1	2	3	4	Total
Crusaders	0	0	0	0	0
Tribe	0	0	0	0	0

at Zable Stadium • Williamsburg, Virginia

- Date: October 3
- Game time: 3:30 p.m.

Game information

First quarter
Second quarter
Third quarter
Fourth quarter

Statistics	HC	W&M
First downs		
Plays–yards		
Rushes–yards		
Passing yards		
Passing: comp–att–int		
Turnovers		
Time of possession		

Team	Category	Player	Statistics
Holy Cross	Passing		
Holy Cross	Rushing		
Holy Cross	Receiving		
William & Mary	Passing		
William & Mary	Rushing		
William & Mary	Receiving		

=== at North Carolina Central ===
William & Mary Tribe (2–4) at North Carolina Central Eagles (2–4) – Game summary

Quarter	1	2	3	4	Total
Tribe	0	0	0	0	0
Eagles	0	0	0	0	0

at O'Kelly–Riddick Stadium • Durham, North Carolina

- Date: October 10
- Game time: 1:00 p.m.

Game information

First quarter
Second quarter
Third quarter
Fourth quarter

Statistics	W&M	NCCU
First downs		
Plays–yards		
Rushes–yards		
Passing yards		
Passing: comp–att–int		
Turnovers		
Time of possession		

Team	Category	Player	Statistics
William & Mary	Passing		
William & Mary	Rushing		
William & Mary	Receiving		
North Carolina Central	Passing		
North Carolina Central	Rushing		
North Carolina Central	Receiving		

=== Georgetown ===
Georgetown Hoyas (2–4) at William & Mary Tribe (3–4) – Game summary

Quarter	1	2	3	4	Total
Hoyas	0	0	0	0	0
Tribe	0	0	0	0	0

at Zable Stadium • Williamsburg, Virginia

- Date: October 24
- Game time: 3:30 p.m.

Game information

First quarter
Second quarter
Third quarter
Fourth quarter

Statistics	GTWN	W&M
First downs		
Plays–yards		
Rushes–yards		
Passing yards		
Passing: comp–att–int		
Turnovers		
Time of possession		

Team	Category	Player	Statistics
Georgetown	Passing		
Georgetown	Rushing		
Georgetown	Receiving		
William & Mary	Passing		
William & Mary	Rushing		
William & Mary	Receiving		

=== at Colgate ===
William & Mary Tribe (3–5) at Colgate Raiders (4–4) – Game summary

Quarter	1	2	3	4	Total
Tribe	0	0	0	0	0
Raiders	0	0	0	0	0

at Andy Kerr Stadium • Hamilton, New York

- Date: October 31
- Game time: 1:00 p.m.

Game information

First quarter
Second quarter
Third quarter
Fourth quarter

Statistics	W&M	COLG
First downs		
Plays–yards		
Rushes–yards		
Passing yards		
Passing: comp–att–int		
Turnovers		
Time of possession		

Team	Category	Player	Statistics
William & Mary	Passing		
William & Mary	Rushing		
William & Mary	Receiving		
Colgate	Passing		
Colgate	Rushing		
Colgate	Receiving		

=== Lafayette ===
Lafayette Leopards (3–5) at William & Mary Tribe (3–6) – Game summary

Quarter	1	2	3	4	Total
Leopards	0	0	0	0	0
Tribe	0	0	0	0	0

at Zable Stadium • Williamsburg, Virginia

- Date: November 7
- Game time: 1:00 p.m.

Game information

First quarter
Second quarter
Third quarter
Fourth quarter

Statistics	LAF	W&M
First downs		
Plays–yards		
Rushes–yards		
Passing yards		
Passing: comp–att–int		
Turnovers		
Time of possession		

Team	Category	Player	Statistics
Lafayette	Passing		
Lafayette	Rushing		
Lafayette	Receiving		
William & Mary	Passing		
William & Mary	Rushing		
William & Mary	Receiving		

=== Bucknell ===
Bucknell Bison (1–9) at William & Mary Tribe (3–7) – Game summary

Quarter	1	2	3	4	Total
Bison	0	0	0	0	0
Tribe	0	0	0	0	0

at Zable Stadium • Williamsburg, Virginia

- Date: November 14
- Game time: 1:00 p.m.

Game information

First quarter
Second quarter
Third quarter
Fourth quarter

Statistics	BUCK	W&M
First downs		
Plays–yards		
Rushes–yards		
Passing yards		
Passing: comp–att–int		
Turnovers		
Time of possession		

Team	Category	Player	Statistics
Bucknell	Passing		
Bucknell	Rushing		
Bucknell	Receiving		
William & Mary	Passing		
William & Mary	Rushing		
William & Mary	Receiving		

=== at Richmond (Capital Cup) ===
William & Mary Tribe (4–7) at Richmond Spiders (6–5) – Game summary

Quarter	1	2	3	4	Total
Tribe	7	2	7	0	16
Spiders	0	3	14	0	17

at E. Claiborne Robins Stadium • Richmond, Virginia

- Date: November 21
- Game time: 12:00 p.m.
- Game weather: Sunny • Temperature: 61 °F (16 °C)
- Game attendance: 6,195
- Referee: Anthony Florio
- TV announcers (ESPN+): Bob Black (play-by-play), Chris Anderson (analyst) and Guerin Austin (sideline)

Game information

First quarter

- (1:27) W&M - Jah'Kei Chavis 4-yard run, Max Lipinski kick (Drive: 9 Plays, 66 yards, 4:45; W&M 7–0)

Second quarter

- (10:11) W&M - 0-yard intentional grounding safety (W&M 9–0)
- (4:16) RICH - Kyle Bitsko 28-yard field goal (Drive: 8 Plays, 76 yards, 3:59; W&M 9–3)

Third quarter

- (12:16) W&M - Carter Carroll 6-yard pass to Kai Austin, Max Lipinski kick (Drive: 6 Plays, 71 yards, 2:38; W&M 16–3)
- (10:02) RICH - Jack Callaghan 7-yard pass to Bryce Allen, Kyle Bitsko kick (Drive: 4 Plays, 75 yards, 2:14; W&M 16–10)
- (1:15) RICH - Aziz Foster-Powell 3-yard run, Kyle Bitsko kick (Drive: 9 Plays, 65 yards, 4:33; RICH 17–16)

Fourth quarter

No scoring plays

Statistics	W&M	RICH
First downs	15	15
Plays–yards	60–285	62–380
Rushes–yards	35–179	46–259
Passing yards	106	121
Passing: comp–att–int	9–25–2	7–16–1
Turnovers	2	1
Time of possession	26:48	33:12

Team	Category	Player	Statistics
William & Mary	Passing	Carter Carroll	9/25, 106 yards, TD, 2 INT
William & Mary	Rushing	Andrew King	22 carries, 102 yards
William & Mary	Receiving	Kai Austin	3 receptions, 27 yards, TD
Richmond	Passing	Jack Callaghan	6/15, 101 yards, TD, INT
Richmond	Rushing	Aziz Foster-Powell	24 carries, 200 yards, TD
Richmond	Receiving	Andreas Hill	2 receptions, 44 yards

== Rankings ==
Ranking movements Legend: ██ Increase in ranking ██ Decrease in ranking — = Not ranked RV = Received votes
	Week														
Poll	Pre	1	2	3	4	5	6	7	8	9	10	11	12	13	Final
STATS	RV	17	16	21	RV	RV									
Coaches	—	19	16	21	RV	—									
