= 2026 North Carolina Central Eagles football team =

American college football season

2026 North Carolina Central Eagles football
- Conference: Mid-Eastern Athletic Conference

Ranking
- BCFP: No. 7
- Record: 6–6 (4–1 MEAC)
- Head coach: Trei Oliver (7th season)
- Offensive coordinator: Chris Barnette (1st season)
- Defensive coordinator: Tommy Thigpen (1st season)
- Home stadium: O'Kelly–Riddick Stadium

2026 Mid-Eastern Athletic Conference football standings
	Conf.			Overall
Team	W		L	W		L
No. 20 South Carolina State $	5	–	0	10	–	2
North Carolina Central	4	–	1	6	–	6
Howard	2	–	3	5	–	7
Delaware State	2	–	3	6	–	6
Morgan State	1	–	4	6	–	6
Norfolk State	1	–	4	5	–	7
$ – Conference champion; As of November 22, 2026; Rankings from STATS Poll

The 2026 North Carolina Central Eagles football team will represent North Carolina Central University as a member of the Mid-Eastern Athletic Conference (MEAC) during the 2026 NCAA Division I FCS football season. The Eagles will be led by seventh-year head coach Trei Oliver and will play their home games at O'Kelly–Riddick Stadium in Durham, North Carolina.

== Schedule ==
Date	Time	Opponent	Site	TV	Result	Attendance
August 29	7:00 p.m.	at Texas Southern*	W.W. Thorne Stadium; Houston, TX	HBCU Go	L 30–42	8,931
September 5	6:00 p.m.	Elizabeth City State*	O'Kelly–Riddick Stadium; Durham, NC	MEAC Network	W 27–6	6,855
September 12	6:00 p.m.	North Carolina A&T*	O'Kelly–Riddick Stadium; Durham, NC (rivalry)	ESPN+	W 30–22	11,632
September 19	6:00 p.m.	at Gardner–Webb*	Ernest W. Spangler Stadium; Boiling Springs, NC	ESPN+	L 20–44	5,144
September 26	4:00 p.m.	at East Carolina*	Dowdy–Ficklen Stadium; Greenville, NC	ESPN+	L 9–42	43,772
October 3	6:00 p.m.	No. 18 Campbell*	O'Kelly–Riddick Stadium; Durham, NC	MEAC Network	L 31–38	2,136
October 10	1:00 p.m.	William & Mary*^{†}	O'Kelly–Riddick Stadium; Durham, NC	ESPN+	L 14–17	11,735
October 23	5:00 p.m.	at Delaware State	Alumni Stadium; Dover, DE	ESPN2	W 31–12	2,503
October 31	2:00 p.m.	Howard	O'Kelly–Riddick Stadium; Durham, NC	ESPN+	W 34–0	5,932
November 7	12:00 p.m.	at Norfolk State	William "Dick" Price Stadium; Norfolk, VA	ESPN+	W 29–28	7,521
November 14	1:30 p.m.	at No. 20 South Carolina State	Oliver C. Dawson Stadium; Orangeburg, SC	ESPN+	L 24–38	
November 21	2:00 p.m.	Morgan State	O'Kelly–Riddick Stadium; Durham, NC	ESPN+	W 41–31	4,723
*Non-conference game; ^{†}Homecoming; Rankings from STATS Poll released prior to the game; All times are in Eastern time

== Game summaries ==
=== at Texas Southern ===
North Carolina Central Eagles (0–0) at Texas Southern Tigers (0–0) – Game summary

Quarter	1	2	3	4	Total
Eagles	14	10	3	3	30
Tigers	0	14	21	7	42

at W.W. Thorne Stadium • Houston, Texas

- Date: August 29
- Game time: 7:00 p.m.
- Game weather: Sunny • Temperature: 94 °F (34 °C) • Wind: SE at 8 miles per hour (13 km/h)
- Game attendance: 8,931
- Referee: Y.N. Myers III
- TV announcers (HBCU Go): James Hadnot, TBA and TBA

Game information

First quarter

- NCCU – Nelson Layne 60-yard run (Riley Daniels kick), 7:16. Eagles 7–0. Drive: 6 plays, 84 yards, 2:59.
- NCCU – Connor Everett 10-yard pass from Nelson Layne (Riley Daniels kick), 0:46. Eagles 14–0. Drive: 8 plays, 63 yards, 3:30.

Second quarter

- TXSO – Jaquan McGee 11-yard pass from Cam'Ron McCoy (Miguel Arana III kick), 11:49. Eagles 14–7. Drive: 9 plays, 93 yards, 3:49.
- NCCU – Nelson Layne 2-yard run (Riley Daniels kick), 4:30. Eagles 21–7. Drive: 14 plays, 85 yards, 7:11.
- TXSO – Jaquan McGee 25-yard pass from Cam'Ron McCoy (Miguel Arana III kick), 0:20. Eagles 21–14. Drive: 6 plays, 77 yards, 1:35.
- NCCU – Riley Daniels 25-yard field goal, 0:00. Eagles 24–14. Drive: 3 plays, 57 yards, 0:20.

Third quarter

- TXSO – Roriyon Richardson 45-yard pass from Cam'Ron McCoy (Miguel Arana III kick), 13:54. Eagles 24–21. Drive: 2 plays, 48 yards, 0:54.
- TXSO – Jordan Thompson 34-yard punt return (Miguel Arana III kick), 9:47. Tigers 28–24.
- NCCU – Riley Daniels 32-yard field goal, 4:35. Tigers 28–27. Drive: 11 plays, 60 yards, 5:12.
- TXSO – Athean Renfro Jr. 14-yard run (Miguel Arana III kick), 2:17. Tigers 35–27. Drive: 5 plays, 74 yards, 2:11.

Fourth quarter

- NCCU – Riley Daniels 37-yard field goal, 12:45. Tigers 35–30. Drive: 4 plays, 1 yard, 1:30.
- TXSO – Jacob Washington 20-yard run (Miguel Arana III kick), 2:07. Tigers 42–30. Drive: 6 plays, 87 yards, 3:16.

Statistics	NCCU	TXSO
First downs	25	19
Plays–yards	73–321	55–462
Rushes–yards	39–190	36–277
Passing yards	131	185
Passing: comp–att–int	16–34–1	8–19–1
Turnovers	1	2
Time of possession	33:16	26:44

Team	Category	Player	Statistics
North Carolina Central	Passing	Nelson Layne	16/31, 131 yards, TD, INT
North Carolina Central	Rushing	Nelson Layne	13 carries, 116 yards, 2 TD
North Carolina Central	Receiving	Rodney Lesane	2 receptions, 36 yards
Texas Southern	Passing	Cam'Ron McCoy	8/19, 185 yards, 3 TD, INT
Texas Southern	Rushing	Athean Renfro Jr.	18 carries, 163 yards, TD
Texas Southern	Receiving	Jaquan McGee	4 receptions, 115 yards, 2 TD

=== Elizabeth City State (DII) ===
Elizabeth City State Vikings (DII) (0–1) at North Carolina Central Eagles (0–1) – Game summary

Quarter	1	2	3	4	Total
Vikings (DII)	0	0	6	0	6
Eagles	14	7	3	3	27

at O'Kelly–Riddick Stadium • Durham, North Carolina

- Date: September 5
- Game time: 6:00 p.m.
- Game weather: Sunny • Temperature: 82 °F (28 °C) • Wind: NW at 4 miles per hour (6.4 km/h)
- Game attendance: 6,855
- Referee: James Brown
- TV: MEAC Network

Game information

First quarter

- NCCU – Chance Peterson 74-yard pass from Nelson Layne (Riley Daniels kick), 7:43. Eagles 7–0. Drive: 2 plays, 89 yards, 0:36.
- NCCU – Gino Addison 1-yard run (Riley Daniels kick), 3:12. Eagles 14–0. Drive: 4 plays, 16 yards, 1:41.

Second quarter

- NCCU – Brendon Wyatt 11-yard pass from Nelson Layne (Riley Daniels kick), 1:50. Eagles 21–0. Drive: 5 plays, 30 yards, 2:13.

Third quarter

- NCCU – Riley Daniels 29-yard field goal, 8:28. Eagles 24–0. Drive: 11 plays, 50 yards, 6:26.
- ELIZ – Josef Manley III 8-yard run (Ezekiel Cheers kick failed), 2:13. Eagles 24–6. Drive: 7 plays, 42 yards, 3:22.

Fourth quarter

- NCCU – Riley Daniels 24-yard field goal, 10:26. Eagles 27–6. Drive: 16 plays, 62 yards, 6:43.

Statistics	ELIZ	NCCU
First downs	13	20
Plays–yards	54–145	61–326
Rushes–yards	32–39	43–166
Passing yards	106	160
Passing: comp–att–int	10–22–1	12–18–1
Turnovers	2	2
Time of possession	29:17	30:43

Team	Category	Player	Statistics
Elizabeth City State	Passing	Josef Manley III	10/22, 106 yards, INT
Elizabeth City State	Rushing	Josef Manley III	11 carries, 24 yards, TD
Elizabeth City State	Receiving	Joe Griffin	1 reception, 31 yards
North Carolina Central	Passing	Nelson Layne	12/18, 160 yards, 2 TD, INT
North Carolina Central	Rushing	Zion Dobson	16 carries, 59 yards
North Carolina Central	Receiving	Chance Peterson	5 receptions, 109 yards, TD

=== North Carolina A&T (rivalry) ===
North Carolina A&T Aggies (0–2) at North Carolina Central Eagles (1–1) – Game summary

Quarter	1	2	3	4	Total
Aggies	0	0	0	0	0
Eagles	0	0	0	0	0

at O'Kelly–Riddick Stadium • Durham, North Carolina

- Date: September 12
- Game time: 6:00 p.m.
- TV: ESPN+

Game information

First quarter
Second quarter
Third quarter
Fourth quarter

Statistics	NCAT	NCCU
First downs		
Plays–yards		
Rushes–yards		
Passing yards		
Passing: comp–att–int		
Turnovers		
Time of possession		

Team	Category	Player	Statistics
North Carolina A&T	Passing		
North Carolina A&T	Rushing		
North Carolina A&T	Receiving		
North Carolina Central	Passing		
North Carolina Central	Rushing		
North Carolina Central	Receiving		

=== at Gardner–Webb ===
North Carolina Central Eagles (2–1) at Gardner–Webb Runnin' Bulldogs (0–3) – Game summary

Quarter	1	2	3	4	Total
Eagles	0	0	0	0	0
Runnin' Bulldogs	0	0	0	0	0

at Ernest W. Spangler Stadium • Boiling Springs, North Carolina

- Date: September 19
- Game time: 6:00 p.m.

Game information

First quarter
Second quarter
Third quarter
Fourth quarter

Statistics	NCCU	GWEB
First downs		
Plays–yards		
Rushes–yards		
Passing yards		
Passing: comp–att–int		
Turnovers		
Time of possession		

Team	Category	Player	Statistics
North Carolina Central	Passing		
North Carolina Central	Rushing		
North Carolina Central	Receiving		
Gardner–Webb	Passing		
Gardner–Webb	Rushing		
Gardner–Webb	Receiving		

=== at East Carolina (FBS) ===
North Carolina Central Eagles (2–2) at East Carolina Pirates (FBS) (1–2) – Game summary

Quarter	1	2	3	4	Total
Eagles	0	0	0	0	0
Pirates (FBS)	0	0	0	0	0

at Dowdy–Ficklen Stadium • Greenville, North Carolina

- Date: September 26
- Game time: 4:00 p.m.
- TV announcers (ESPN+): Evan Budrovich (play-by-play) and Jay Sonnhalter (analyst)

Game information

First quarter
Second quarter
Third quarter
Fourth quarter

Statistics	NCCU	ECU
First downs		
Plays–yards		
Rushes–yards		
Passing yards		
Passing: comp–att–int		
Turnovers		
Time of possession		

Team	Category	Player	Statistics
North Carolina Central	Passing		
North Carolina Central	Rushing		
North Carolina Central	Receiving		
East Carolina	Passing		
East Carolina	Rushing		
East Carolina	Receiving		

=== No. 18 Campbell ===
No. 18 Campbell Fighting Camels (3–2) at North Carolina Central Eagles (2–3) – Game summary

Quarter	1	2	3	4	Total
No. 18 Fighting Camels	0	0	0	0	0
Eagles	0	0	0	0	0

at O'Kelly–Riddick Stadium • Durham, North Carolina

- Date: October 3
- Game time: 6:00 p.m.
- TV: MEAC Network

Game information

First quarter
Second quarter
Third quarter
Fourth quarter

Statistics	CAM	NCCU
First downs		
Plays–yards		
Rushes–yards		
Passing yards		
Passing: comp–att–int		
Turnovers		
Time of possession		

Team	Category	Player	Statistics
Campbell	Passing		
Campbell	Rushing		
Campbell	Receiving		
North Carolina Central	Passing		
North Carolina Central	Rushing		
North Carolina Central	Receiving		

=== William & Mary ===
William & Mary Tribe (2–4) at North Carolina Central Eagles (2–4) – Game summary

Quarter	1	2	3	4	Total
Tribe	0	0	0	0	0
Eagles	0	0	0	0	0

at O'Kelly–Riddick Stadium • Durham, North Carolina

- Date: October 10
- Game time: 1:00 p.m.

Game information

First quarter
Second quarter
Third quarter
Fourth quarter

Statistics	W&M	NCCU
First downs		
Plays–yards		
Rushes–yards		
Passing yards		
Passing: comp–att–int		
Turnovers		
Time of possession		

Team	Category	Player	Statistics
William & Mary	Passing		
William & Mary	Rushing		
William & Mary	Receiving		
North Carolina Central	Passing		
North Carolina Central	Rushing		
North Carolina Central	Receiving		

=== at Delaware State ===
North Carolina Central Eagles (2–5) at Delaware State Hornets (4–3) – Game summary

Quarter	1	2	3	4	Total
Eagles	0	0	0	0	0
Hornets	0	0	0	0	0

at Alumni Stadium • Dover, Delaware

- Date: October 23
- Game time: 5:00 p.m.

Game information

First quarter
Second quarter
Third quarter
Fourth quarter

Statistics	NCCU	DSU
First downs		
Plays–yards		
Rushes–yards		
Passing yards		
Passing: comp–att–int		
Turnovers		
Time of possession		

Team	Category	Player	Statistics
North Carolina Central	Passing		
North Carolina Central	Rushing		
North Carolina Central	Receiving		
Delaware State	Passing		
Delaware State	Rushing		
Delaware State	Receiving		

=== Howard ===
Howard Bison (4–4) at North Carolina Central Eagles (3–5) – Game summary

Quarter	1	2	3	4	Total
Bison	0	0	0	0	0
Eagles	0	0	0	0	0

at O'Kelly–Riddick Stadium • Durham, North Carolina

- Date: October 31
- Game time: 2:00 p.m.

Game information

First quarter
Second quarter
Third quarter
Fourth quarter

Statistics	HOW	NCCU
First downs		
Plays–yards		
Rushes–yards		
Passing yards		
Passing: comp–att–int		
Turnovers		
Time of possession		

Team	Category	Player	Statistics
Howard	Passing		
Howard	Rushing		
Howard	Receiving		
North Carolina Central	Passing		
North Carolina Central	Rushing		
North Carolina Central	Receiving		

=== at Norfolk State ===
North Carolina Central Eagles (4–5) at Norfolk State Spartans (4–5) – Game summary

Quarter	1	2	3	4	Total
Eagles	0	0	0	0	0
Spartans	0	0	0	0	0

at William "Dick" Price Stadium • Norfolk, Virginia

- Date: November 7
- Game time: 12:00 p.m.

Game information

First quarter
Second quarter
Third quarter
Fourth quarter

Statistics	NCCU	NORF
First downs		
Plays–yards		
Rushes–yards		
Passing yards		
Passing: comp–att–int		
Turnovers		
Time of possession		

Team	Category	Player	Statistics
North Carolina Central	Passing		
North Carolina Central	Rushing		
North Carolina Central	Receiving		
Norfolk State	Passing		
Norfolk State	Rushing		
Norfolk State	Receiving		

=== at No. 20 South Carolina State ===
North Carolina Central Eagles (5–5) at No. 20 South Carolina State Bulldogs (8–2) – Game summary

Quarter	1	2	3	4	Total
Eagles	0	0	0	0	0
No. 20 Bulldogs	0	0	0	0	0

at Oliver C. Dawson Stadium • Orangeburg, South Carolina

- Date: November 14
- Game time: 1:30 p.m.

Game information

First quarter
Second quarter
Third quarter
Fourth quarter

Statistics	NCCU	SCST
First downs		
Plays–yards		
Rushes–yards		
Passing yards		
Passing: comp–att–int		
Turnovers		
Time of possession		

Team	Category	Player	Statistics
North Carolina Central	Passing		
North Carolina Central	Rushing		
North Carolina Central	Receiving		
South Carolina State	Passing		
South Carolina State	Rushing		
South Carolina State	Receiving		

=== Morgan State ===
Morgan State Bears (6–5) at North Carolina Central Eagles (5–6) – Game summary

Quarter	1	2	3	4	Total
Bears	0	0	0	0	0
Eagles	0	0	0	0	0

at O'Kelly–Riddick Stadium • Durham, North Carolina

- Date: November 21
- Game time: 2:00 p.m.

Game information

First quarter
Second quarter
Third quarter
Fourth quarter

Statistics	MORG	NCCU
First downs		
Plays–yards		
Rushes–yards		
Passing yards		
Passing: comp–att–int		
Turnovers		
Time of possession		

Team	Category	Player	Statistics
Morgan State	Passing		
Morgan State	Rushing		
Morgan State	Receiving		
North Carolina Central	Passing		
North Carolina Central	Rushing		
North Carolina Central	Receiving		
