= 2026 South Carolina State Bulldogs football team =

American college football season

2026 South Carolina State Bulldogs football
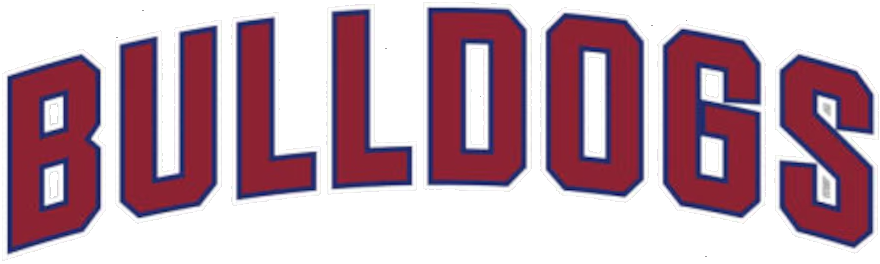

MEAC champion
- Conference: Mid-Eastern Athletic Conference

Ranking
- STATS: No. 20
- FCS Coaches: No. 18
- BCFP: No. 1
- Record: 10–2 (5–0 MEAC)
- Head coach: Chennis Berry (3rd season)
- Offensive coordinator: K. J. Black (1st season)
- Co-offensive coordinator: Jason Onyebuagu (1st season)
- Offensive scheme: Pro spread
- Co-defensive coordinators: Kevin King (1st season); Alvin Fosselman III (1st season)
- Base defense: 4–2–5
- Home stadium: Oliver C. Dawson Stadium

2026 Mid-Eastern Athletic Conference football standings
	Conf.			Overall
Team	W		L	W		L
No. 20 South Carolina State $	5	–	0	10	–	2
North Carolina Central	4	–	1	6	–	6
Howard	2	–	3	5	–	7
Delaware State	2	–	3	6	–	6
Morgan State	1	–	4	6	–	6
Norfolk State	1	–	4	5	–	7
$ – Conference champion; As of November 22, 2026; Rankings from STATS Poll

The 2026 South Carolina State Bulldogs football team represent South Carolina State University as a member of the Mid-Eastern Athletic Conference (MEAC) during the 2026 NCAA Division I FCS football season. The Bulldogs are led by third-year head coach Chennis Berry and play their home games at Oliver C. Dawson Stadium in Orangeburg, South Carolina.

== Schedule ==
Date	Time	Opponent	Rank	Site	TV	Result	Attendance
August 29	6:00 p.m.	Savannah State*	No. 24	Oliver C. Dawson Stadium; Orangeburg, SC	ESPN+	W 87–0	12,000
September 6	3:00 p.m.	vs. Florida A&M*	No. 21	Hard Rock Stadium; Miami Gardens, FL (Orange Blossom Classic)	ESPN	W 31–13	23,188
September 12	6:00 p.m.	Virginia State*	No. 22	Oliver C. Dawson Stadium; Orangeburg, SC	MEAC Network	W 66–0	11,500
September 19	7:00 p.m.	at Furman*	No. 18	Paladin Stadium; Greenville, SC	ESPN+	W 20–17	9,217
September 26	7:00 p.m.	at Bethune–Cookman*	No. 16	Daytona Stadium; Daytona Beach, FL	HBCU GO	W 31–21	4,750
October 3	2:00 p.m.	The Citadel*	No. 15	Oliver C. Dawson Stadium; Orangeburg, SC	MEAC Network	L 31–34	11,250
October 10	6:00 p.m.	at Charleston Southern*	No. 21	Buccaneer Field; North Charleston, SC	ESPN+	L 39–49	334
October 24	1:30 p.m.	Norfolk State^{†}		Oliver C. Dawson Stadium; Orangeburg, SC	ESPN+	W 22–7	22,000
October 29	7:00 p.m.	at Morgan State	No. 25	Hughes Stadium; Baltimore, MD	ESPNU	W 51–10	5,208
November 5	5:00 p.m.	at Howard	No. 24	William H. Greene Stadium; Washington, D.C.	ESPNU	W 35–28	4,827
November 14	1:30 p.m.	North Carolina Central	No. 20	Oliver C. Dawson Stadium; Orangeburg, SC	ESPN+	W 38–24	15,234
November 21	1:30 p.m.	Delaware State	No. 20	Oliver C. Dawson Stadium; Orangeburg, SC	ESPN+	W 26–16	6,875
*Non-conference game; ^{†}Homecoming; Rankings from STATS Poll released prior to the game; All times are in Eastern time

== Rankings ==
Ranking movements Legend: ██ Increase in ranking ██ Decrease in ranking RV = Received votes ( ) = First-place votes
	Week														
Poll	Pre	1	2	3	4	5	6	7	8	9	10	11	12	13	Final
STATS	24	21	22	18	16	15	21	RV	RV	25	24	20	20		
Coaches	25	22	20	16	14	12	21	RV	25	22	17	18	18		
Black College Football	1 (36)	1 (20)	1 (23)	1 (26)	1 (20)	1 (27)	2 (11)	5	3 (2)	2	2 (10)	1 (21)			

== Game summaries ==
=== Savannah State (DII) ===
Savannah State Tigers (DII) (0–0) at No. 24 South Carolina State Bulldogs (0–0) – Game summary

Quarter	1	2	3	4	Total
Tigers (DII)	0	0	0	0	0
No. 24 Bulldogs	21	31	14	21	87

at Oliver C. Dawson Stadium • Orangeburg, South Carolina

- Date: August 29
- Game time: 6:00 p.m.
- Game weather: Sunny • Temperature: 90 °F (32 °C)
- Game attendance: 12,000
- Referee: James Brown
- TV announcers (ESPN+): De Hansen and Steve Foster

Game information

First quarter

- SCST – Malaqhi Jones 23-yard pass from Keely Watson (Jett Jackson kick), 11:52. Bulldogs 7–0. Drive: 7 plays, 84 yards, 3:03.
- SCST – Mason Pickett-Hicks 9-yard pass from Keely Watson (Jett Jackson kick), 6:45. Bulldogs 14–0. Drive: 6 plays, 29 yards, 1:57.
- SCST – Ronnie Robinson 30-yard run (Jett Jackson kick), 3:15. Bulldogs 21–0. Drive: 4 plays, 43 yards, 1:57.

Second quarter

- SCST – Mason Pickett-Hicks 7-yard run (Jett Jackson kick), 14:55. Bulldogs 28–0. Drive: 5 plays, 62 yards, 2:00.
- SCST – Josh Shaw 5-yard run (Jett Jackson kick), 11:33. Bulldogs 35–0. Drive: 5 plays, 26 yards, 2:30.
- SCST – Zaivan Offord 13-yard pass from Keely Watson (Jett Jackson kick), 9:39. Bulldogs 42–0. Drive: 2 plays, 10 yards, 0:29.
- SCST – Tyler Smith 7-yard pass from Keely Watson (Jett Jackson kick), 4:03. Bulldogs 49–0. Drive: 7 plays, 68 yards, 3:16.
- SCST – Jett Jackson 26-yard field goal, 0:09. Bulldogs 52–0. Drive: 7 plays, 25 yards, 1:44.

Third quarter

- SCST – Josh Shaw 4-yard run (Jett Jackson kick), 11:54. Bulldogs 59–0. Drive: 4 plays, 80 yards, 1:33.
- SCST – Josh Shaw 10-yard run (Jett Jackson kick), 7:16. Bulldogs 66–0. Drive: 5 plays, 64 yards, 1:42.

Fourth quarter

- SCST – Javion Martin 10-yard run (Juan Dominguez kick), 14:10. Bulldogs 73–0. Drive: 7 plays, 42 yards, 4:11.
- SCST – Ricorian Brown 16-yard run (Juan Dominguez kick), 3:57. Bulldogs 80–0. Drive: 4 plays, 56 yards, 2:27.
- SCST – Jayden Fuller 0-yard blocked punt return (Juan Dominguez kick), 1:50. Bulldogs 87–0.

Statistics	SAV	SCST
First downs	6	32
Plays–yards	57–117	70–627
Rushes–yards	39–75	46–423
Passing yards	42	204
Passing: comp–att–int	7–18–1	18–24–0
Turnovers	3	0
Time of possession	28:19	31:41

Team	Category	Player	Statistics
Savannah State	Passing	Christian Burks	5/14, 34 yards, INT
Savannah State	Rushing	Fabian Walker	2 carries, 16 yards
Savannah State	Receiving	Elijah Stephens	2 receptions, 18 yards
South Carolina State	Passing	Ronnie Robinson	9/11, 96 yards
South Carolina State	Rushing	Mason Pickett-Hicks	9 carries, 95 yards, TD
South Carolina State	Receiving	Shamontae Burgess	4 receptions, 60 yards

=== vs. Florida A&M (Orange Blossom Classic) ===
No. 21 South Carolina State Bulldogs (1–0) vs. Florida A&M Rattlers (1–0) – Game summary

Quarter	1	2	3	4	Total
No. 21 Bulldogs	14	7	7	3	31
Rattlers	3	3	7	0	13

at Hard Rock Stadium • Miami Gardens, Florida

- Date: September 6
- Game time: 3:00 p.m.
- Game weather: Cloudy • Temperature: 76 °F (24 °C) • Wind: SW at 6 miles per hour (9.7 km/h)
- Game attendance: 23,188
- Referee: Y.N. Myers III
- TV announcers (ESPN): Tiffany Greene, Jay Walker, and Cameron Wolfe

Game information

First quarter

- FAMU – Emilio Bacardi 30-yard field goal, 7:50. Rattlers 3–0. Drive: 14 plays, 62 yards, 7:10.
- SCST – Mason Pickett-Hicks 58-yard run (Jett Jackson kick), 7:17. Bulldogs 7–3. Drive: 2 plays, 57 yards, 0:28.
- SCST – Josh Shaw 6-yard run (Jett Jackson kick), 7:04. Bulldogs 14–3. Drive: 1 play, 21 yards, 0:05.

Second quarter

- FAMU – Emilio Bacardi 31-yard field goal, 7:23. Bulldogs 14–6. Drive: 10 plays, 69 yards, 4:59.
- SCST – Josh Shaw 1-yard run (Jett Jackson kick), 3:31. Bulldogs 21–6. Drive: 7 plays, 75 yards, 3:52.

Third quarter

- SCST – Mason Pickett-Hicks 32-yard run (Jett Jackson kick), 13:24. Bulldogs 28–6. Drive: 4 plays, 75 yards, 1:36.
- FAMU – Justin Bostic 80-yard interception return (Emilio Bacardi kick), 6:07. Bulldogs 28–13.

Fourth quarter

- SCST – Jett Jackson 39-yard field goal, 1:09. Bulldogs 31–13. Drive: 6 plays, 25 yards, 3:15.

Statistics	SCST	FAMU
First downs	19	10
Plays–yards	58–479	60–161
Rushes–yards	38–292	30–(-1)
Passing yards	187	162
Passing: comp–att–int	12–20–2	13–30–0
Turnovers	3	1
Time of possession	30:13	29:47

Team	Category	Player	Statistics
South Carolina State	Passing	Keely Watson	10/17, 168 yards, 2 INT
South Carolina State	Rushing	Mason Pickett-Hicks	17 carries, 210 yards, 2 TD
South Carolina State	Receiving	Malaqhi Jones	6 receptions, 72 yards
Florida A&M	Passing	Isaiah Knowles	7/22, 94 yards
Florida A&M	Rushing	Jamal Hailey	11 carries, 13 yards
Florida A&M	Receiving	Kieren Jackson	4 receptions, 69 yards

=== Virginia State (D-II) ===
Virginia State Trojans (D-II) (2–0) at No. 22 South Carolina State Bulldogs (2–0) – Game summary

Quarter	1	2	3	4	Total
Trojans (D-II)	0	0	0	0	0
No. 22 Bulldogs	14	17	21	14	66

at Oliver C. Dawson Stadium • Orangeburg, South Carolina

- Date: September 12
- Game time: 6:00 p.m.
- Game weather: Sunny • Temperature: 93 °F (34 °C)
- Game attendance: 11,500
- Referee: Ryan Massey
- TV: MEAC Network

Game information

First quarter

- (8:07) SCST – DJ Maultsby 44-yard pass from Keely Watson, Jett Jackson kick (Drive: 4 plays, 59 yards, 1:45; South Carolina State 7–0)
- (2:56) SCST – Josh Shaw 1-yard run, Jett Jackson kick (Drive: 8 plays, 53 yards, 3:14; South Carolina State 14–0)

Second quarter

- (9:20) SCST – Jett Jackson 52-yard field goal (Drive: 12 plays, 56 yards, 5:40; South Carolina State 17–0)
- (2:54) SCST – Malik Brightwell 30-yard pass from Ronnie Robinson, Jett Jackson kick (Drive: 2 plays, 97 yards, 0:36; South Carolina State 24–0)
- (0:47) SCST – Mason Pickett-Hicks 21-yard pass from Ronnie Robinson, Jett Jackson kick (Drive: 5 plays, 32 yards, 0:52; South Carolina State 31–0)

Third quarter

- (10:28) SCST – Nick Brown 1-yard pass from Keely Watson, Jett Jackson kick (Drive: 11 plays, 70 yards, 3:56; South Carolina State 38–0)
- (3:20) SCST – Julian Milligan 4-yard run, Jett Jackson kick (Drive: 10 plays, 58 yards, 6:09; South Carolina State 45–0)
- (3:05) SCST – Marquis Lane-Owens 1-yard fumble recovery, Juan Dominguez kick (South Carolina State 52–0)

Fourth quarter

- (7:28) SCST – Ricorian Brown 21-yard run, Juan Dominguez kick (Drive: 6 plays, 74 yards, 8:35; South Carolina State 59–0)
- (7:08) SCST – Zan Dunham 25-yard interception, Juan Dominguez kick (South Carolina State 66–0)

Statistics	VAST	SCST
First downs	8	27
Plays–yards	49–114	69–524
Rushes–yards	25–55	42–282
Passing yards	59	242
Passing: comp–att–int	8–24–2	19–27–0
Turnovers	5	0
Time of possession	22:27	37:33

Team	Category	Player	Statistics
Virginia State	Passing	Rahsaan Matthews Jr.	8/19, 59 yards
Virginia State	Rushing	Brandon Rose	5 carries, 51 yards
Virginia State	Receiving	Vincent Ordenes	2 receptions, 19 yards
South Carolina State	Passing	Keely Watson	15/20, 175 yards, 2 TD
South Carolina State	Rushing	Mason Pickett-Hicks	10 carries, 112 yards
South Carolina State	Receiving	DJ Maultsby	3 receptions, 68 yards, TD

=== at Furman ===
No. 18 South Carolina State Bulldogs (3–0) at Furman Paladins (2–1) – Game summary

Quarter	1	2	3	4	Total
No. 18 Bulldogs	14	3	0	3	20
Paladins	0	3	3	11	17

at Paladin Stadium • Greenville, South Carolina

- Date: September 19
- Game time: 7:31 p.m.
- Game weather: Cloudy • Temperature: 76 °F (24 °C) • Wind: NE at 3 miles per hour (4.8 km/h)
- Game attendance: 9,217
- Referee: Bruce Austin
- TV: ESPN+
- Report: Official report

Game information

First quarter
Second quarter
Third quarter
Fourth quarter

Statistics	SCST	FUR
First downs	16	18
Plays–yards	68–332	74–317
Rushes–yards	36–124	34–53
Passing yards	208	264
Passing: comp–att–int	16–32–1	21–40–0
Turnovers	1	1
Time of possession	31:57	28:03

Team	Category	Player	Statistics
South Carolina State	Passing	Keely Watson	12/25, 186 yards, TD, INT
South Carolina State	Rushing	Josh Shaw	9 carries, 55 yards, TD
South Carolina State	Receiving	DJ Maultsby	4 receptions, 118 yards, TD
Furman	Passing	Connor Ackerley	10/18, 164 yards, TD
Furman	Rushing	Ben Croasdale	8 carries, 24 yards
Furman	Receiving	Luke Shields	7 receptions, 133 yards, TD

=== at Bethune–Cookman ===
No. 16 South Carolina State Bulldogs (0–0) at Bethune–Cookman Wildcats (0–0) – Game summary

Quarter	1	2	3	4	Total
No. 16 Bulldogs	0	0	0	0	0
Wildcats	0	0	0	0	0

at Daytona Stadium • Daytona Beach, Florida

- Date: September 26
- Game time: 7:00 p.m.

Game information

First quarter
Second quarter
Third quarter
Fourth quarter

Statistics	SCST	BCU
First downs		
Plays–yards		
Rushes–yards		
Passing yards		
Passing: comp–att–int		
Turnovers		
Time of possession		

Team	Category	Player	Statistics
South Carolina State	Passing		
South Carolina State	Rushing		
South Carolina State	Receiving		
Bethune–Cookman	Passing		
Bethune–Cookman	Rushing		
Bethune–Cookman	Receiving		

=== The Citadel ===
The Citadel Bulldogs (1–3) at No. 15 South Carolina State Bulldogs (5–0) – Game summary

Quarter	1	2	3	4	Total
The Citadel	0	0	0	0	0
No. 15 South Carolina State	0	0	0	0	0

at Oliver C. Dawson Stadium • Orangeburg, South Carolina

- Date: October 3
- Game time: 2:00 p.m.
- TV: MEAC Network

Game information

First quarter
Second quarter
Third quarter
Fourth quarter

Statistics	CIT	SCST
First downs		
Plays–yards		
Rushes–yards		
Passing yards		
Passing: comp–att–int		
Turnovers		
Time of possession		

Team	Category	Player	Statistics
The Citadel	Passing		
The Citadel	Rushing		
The Citadel	Receiving		
South Carolina State	Passing		
South Carolina State	Rushing		
South Carolina State	Receiving		

=== at Charleston Southern ===
No. 21 South Carolina State Bulldogs (5–1) at Charleston Southern Buccaneers (2–3) – Game summary

Quarter	1	2	3	4	Total
No. 21 Bulldogs	0	0	0	0	0
Buccaneers	0	0	0	0	0

at Buccaneer Field • North Charleston, South Carolina

- Date: October 10
- Game time: 6:00 p.m.

Game information

First quarter
Second quarter
Third quarter
Fourth quarter

Statistics	SCST	CHSO
First downs		
Plays–yards		
Rushes–yards		
Passing yards		
Passing: comp–att–int		
Turnovers		
Time of possession		

Team	Category	Player	Statistics
South Carolina State	Passing		
South Carolina State	Rushing		
South Carolina State	Receiving		
Charleston Southern	Passing		
Charleston Southern	Rushing		
Charleston Southern	Receiving		

=== Norfolk State ===
Norfolk State Spartans (4–3) at South Carolina State Bulldogs (5–2) – Game summary

Quarter	1	2	3	4	Total
Spartans	0	0	0	0	0
Bulldogs	0	0	0	0	0

at Oliver C. Dawson Stadium • Orangeburg, South Carolina

- Date: October 24
- Game time: 1:30 p.m.

Game information

First quarter
Second quarter
Third quarter
Fourth quarter

Statistics	NORF	SCST
First downs		
Plays–yards		
Rushes–yards		
Passing yards		
Passing: comp–att–int		
Turnovers		
Time of possession		

Team	Category	Player	Statistics
Norfolk State	Passing		
Norfolk State	Rushing		
Norfolk State	Receiving		
South Carolina State	Passing		
South Carolina State	Rushing		
South Carolina State	Receiving		

=== at Morgan State ===
No. 25 South Carolina State Bulldogs (6–2) at Morgan State Bears (5–3) – Game summary

Quarter	1	2	3	4	Total
No. 25 Bulldogs	0	0	0	0	0
Bears	0	0	0	0	0

at Hughes Stadium • Baltimore, Maryland

- Date: October 29
- Game time: 7:00 p.m.

Game information

First quarter
Second quarter
Third quarter
Fourth quarter

Statistics	SCST	MORG
First downs		
Plays–yards		
Rushes–yards		
Passing yards		
Passing: comp–att–int		
Turnovers		
Time of possession		

Team	Category	Player	Statistics
South Carolina State	Passing		
South Carolina State	Rushing		
South Carolina State	Receiving		
Morgan State	Passing		
Morgan State	Rushing		
Morgan State	Receiving		

=== at Howard ===
No. 24 South Carolina State Bulldogs (7–2) at Howard Bison (4–5) – Game summary

Quarter	1	2	3	4	Total
No. 24 Bulldogs	0	0	0	0	0
Bison	0	0	0	0	0

at William H. Greene Stadium • Washington, DC

- Date: November 5
- Game time: 5:00 p.m.

Game information

First quarter
Second quarter
Third quarter
Fourth quarter

Statistics	SCST	HOW
First downs		
Plays–yards		
Rushes–yards		
Passing yards		
Passing: comp–att–int		
Turnovers		
Time of possession		

Team	Category	Player	Statistics
South Carolina State	Passing		
South Carolina State	Rushing		
South Carolina State	Receiving		
Howard	Passing		
Howard	Rushing		
Howard	Receiving		

=== North Carolina Central ===
North Carolina Central Eagles (5–5) at No. 20 South Carolina State Bulldogs (8–2) – Game summary

Quarter	1	2	3	4	Total
Eagles	0	0	0	0	0
No. 20 Bulldogs	0	0	0	0	0

at Oliver C. Dawson Stadium • Orangeburg, South Carolina

- Date: November 14
- Game time: 1:30 p.m.

Game information

First quarter
Second quarter
Third quarter
Fourth quarter

Statistics	NCCU	SCST
First downs		
Plays–yards		
Rushes–yards		
Passing yards		
Passing: comp–att–int		
Turnovers		
Time of possession		

Team	Category	Player	Statistics
North Carolina Central	Passing		
North Carolina Central	Rushing		
North Carolina Central	Receiving		
South Carolina State	Passing		
South Carolina State	Rushing		
South Carolina State	Receiving		

=== Delaware State ===
Delaware State Hornets (6–5) at No. 20 South Carolina State Bulldogs (9–2) – Game summary

Quarter	1	2	3	4	Total
Hornets	0	0	0	0	0
No. 20 Bulldogs	0	0	0	0	0

at Oliver C. Dawson Stadium • Orangeburg, South Carolina

- Date: November 21
- Game time: 1:30 p.m.

Game information

First quarter
Second quarter
Third quarter
Fourth quarter

Statistics	DSU	SCST
First downs		
Plays–yards		
Rushes–yards		
Passing yards		
Passing: comp–att–int		
Turnovers		
Time of possession		

Team	Category	Player	Statistics
Delaware State	Passing		
Delaware State	Rushing		
Delaware State	Receiving		
South Carolina State	Passing		
South Carolina State	Rushing		
South Carolina State	Receiving		
