= 2026 Morgan State Bears football team =

American college football season

2026 Morgan State Bears football
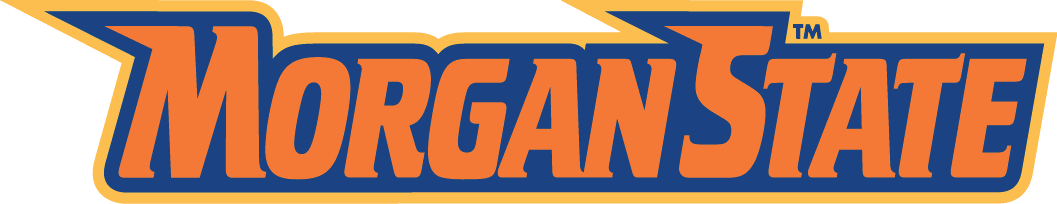
- Conference: Mid-Eastern Athletic Conference

Ranking
- BCFP: No. 5
- Record: 6–6 (1–4 MEAC)
- Head coach: Damon Wilson (5th season)
- Offensive coordinator: Apollo Wright (3rd season)
- Defensive coordinator: Antone' Sewell (5th season)
- Home stadium: Hughes Stadium

2026 Mid-Eastern Athletic Conference football standings
| | Conf. | | | Overall |
| Team | W | | L | W | | L |
|---|---|---|---|---|---|---|
| No. 20 South Carolina State $ | 5 | – | 0 | 10 | – | 2 |
| North Carolina Central | 4 | – | 1 | 6 | – | 6 |
| Howard | 2 | – | 3 | 5 | – | 7 |
| Delaware State | 2 | – | 3 | 6 | – | 6 |
| Morgan State | 1 | – | 4 | 6 | – | 6 |
| Norfolk State | 1 | – | 4 | 5 | – | 7 |
$ – Conference champion; As of November 22, 2026; Rankings from STATS Poll

The 2026 Morgan State Bears football team will represent Morgan State University as a member of the Mid-Eastern Athletic Conference (MEAC) during the 2026 NCAA Division I FCS football season. The Bears will be led by fifth-year head coach Damon Wilson and will play their home games at Hughes Stadium in Baltimore, Maryland.

== Schedule ==
| Date | Time | Opponent | Rank | Site | TV | Result | Attendance |
|---|---|---|---|---|---|---|---|
| August 29 | 6:00 p.m. | at North Carolina A&T* | | Truist Stadium; Greensboro, NC | FloFootball | W 17–7 | 16,264 |
| September 5 | 10:00 p.m. | at Arizona State* | | Mountain America Stadium; Tempe, AZ | ESPN+ | L 7–70 | 54,004 |
| September 12 | 6:00 p.m. | VUL* | | Hughes Stadium; Baltimore, MD | MEAC Network | W 55–0 | 4,869 |
| September 19 | 6:00 p.m. | at Towson* | | Johnny Unitas Stadium; Towson, MD (The Battle for Greater Baltimore) | FloFootball | W 41–26 | 10,900 |
| October 3 | 1:00 p.m. | at Villanova* | | Villanova Stadium; Villanova, PA | ESPN+ | W 38–35 | 3,463 |
| October 10 | 1:00 p.m. | Robert Morris*^{†} | | Hughes Stadium; Baltimore, MD | ESPN+ | W 28–27 | 11,200 |
| October 17 | 6:30 p.m. | at Tennessee State* | No. 24 | Nissan Stadium; Nashville, TN | ESPN+ | L 16–25 | 11,347 |
| October 24 | 3:00 p.m. | Howard | | Hughes Stadium; Baltimore, MD (rivalry) | ESPN+ | L 20–26 ^{OT} | 5,762 |
| October 29 | 7:00 p.m. | No. 25 South Carolina State | | Hughes Stadium; Baltimore, MD | ESPNU | L 10–51 | 5,208 |
| November 7 | 1:00 p.m. | at Delaware State | | Alumni Stadium; Dover, DE | ESPN+ | L 14–24 | 4,503 |
| November 14 | 12:00 p.m. | Norfolk State | | Hughes Stadium; Baltimore, MD | ESPN+ | W 17–7 | 4,767 |
| November 21 | 2:00 p.m. | at North Carolina Central | | O'Kelly–Riddick Stadium; Durham, NC | ESPN+ | L 31–41 | 4,723 |
*Non-conference game; ^{†}Homecoming; Rankings from STATS Poll released prior to the game; All times are in Eastern time

== Game summaries ==
=== at North Carolina A&T ===
Morgan State Bears (0–0) at North Carolina A&T Aggies (0–0) – Game summary

| Quarter | 1 | 2 | 3 | 4 | Total |
|---|---|---|---|---|---|
| Bears | 0 | 3 | 0 | 14 | 17 |
| Aggies | 7 | 0 | 0 | 0 | 7 |

at Truist Stadium • Greensboro, North Carolina

- Date: August 29
- Game time: 6:00 p.m.
- Game weather: Cloudy • Temperature: 86 °F (30 °C) • Wind: E at 7 miles per hour (11 km/h)
- Game attendance: 16,264
- Referee: Alexander Randolph
- TV announcers (FloCollege): Spencer Turkin, Damieon Banks and Reiven Douglas

Game information

First quarter

- NCAT – Braxton Thomas 2-yard run (Asher Holland kick), 3:08. Aggies 7–0. Drive: 17 plays, 70 yards, 9:33.

Second quarter

- MORG – Alex Amaya 25-yard field goal, 5:54. Aggies 7–3. Drive: 8 plays, 66 yards, 5:21.

Third quarter

- No scoring plays.

Fourth quarter

- MORG – Joseph Towler 68-yard pass from Cameron Edge (Gavin Fetty kick), 14:23. Bears 10–7. Drive: 3 plays, 80 yards, 0:53.
- MORG – Jordan Barnett 22-yard run (Alex Amaya kick), 1:03. Bears 17–7. Drive: 8 plays, 52 yards, 3:44.

| Statistics | MORG | NCAT |
|---|---|---|
| First downs | 12 | 19 |
| Plays–yards | 41–276 | 68–328 |
| Rushes–yards | 22–109 | 35–88 |
| Passing yards | 167 | 240 |
| Passing: comp–att–int | 13–19–1 | 20–33–0 |
| Turnovers | 1 | 0 |
| Time of possession | 24:19 | 35:41 |

| Team | Category | Player | Statistics |
|---|---|---|---|
| Morgan State | Passing | Cameron Edge | 13/19, 167 yards, TD, INT |
| Morgan State | Rushing | Jordan Barnett | 12 carries, 114 yards, TD |
| Morgan State | Receiving | Joseph Towler | 1 reception, 68 yards, TD |
| North Carolina A&T | Passing | Braxton Thomas | 20/32, 240 yards |
| North Carolina A&T | Rushing | JT Smith | 19 carries, 51 yards |
| North Carolina A&T | Receiving | Rory Jones-Amen-Hetep | 2 receptions, 52 yards |

=== at Arizona State (FBS) ===
Morgan State Bears (1–0) at Arizona State Sun Devils (FBS) (0–0) – Game summary

| Quarter | 1 | 2 | 3 | 4 | Total |
|---|---|---|---|---|---|
| Bears | 7 | 0 | 0 | 0 | 7 |
| Sun Devils (FBS) | 28 | 21 | 21 | 0 | 70 |

at Mountain America Stadium • Tempe, Arizona

- Date: September 5
- Game time: 10:00 p.m.
- Game weather: Clear • Temperature: 99 °F (37 °C) • Wind: NW at 10 miles per hour (16 km/h)
- Game attendance: 54,004
- Referee: Kevin Mar
- TV announcers (ESPN+): James Westling and Michael Bumpus

Game information

First quarter

- ASU – Kyson Brown 46-yard run (Carson Smith kick), 13:26. Sun Devils 7–0. Drive: 2 plays, 54 yards, 0:30.
- ASU – Omarion Miller 10-yard pass from Cutter Boley (Carson Smith kick), 12:10. Sun Devils 14–0. Drive: 5 plays, 53 yards, 1:16.
- ASU – Marquis Gillis 25-yard run (Carson Smith kick), 6:15. Sun Devils 21–0. Drive: 5 plays, 50 yards, 1:17.
- MORG – Jordan Barnett 2-yard run (Alex Amaya kick), 4:20. Sun Devils 21–7. Drive: 4 plays, 75 yards, 1:55.
- ASU – Reed Harris 28-yard pass from Cutter Boley (Carson Smith kick), 2:45. Sun Devils 28–7. Drive: 4 plays, 75 yards, 1:34.

Second quarter

- ASU – Grayson Rigdon 54-yard pass from Cutter Boley (Carson Smith kick), 13:28. Sun Devils 35–7. Drive: 3 plays, 72 yards, 1:18.
- ASU – AJ Ia 12-yard pass from Cutter Boley (Carson Smith kick), 9:11. Sun Devils 42–7. Drive: 6 plays, 81 yards, 3:03.
- ASU – Reed Harris 8-yard pass from Cutter Boley (Carson Smith kick), 1:56. Sun Devils 49–7. Drive: 12 plays, 63 yards, 5:41.

Third quarter

- ASU – Grayson Rigdon 56-yard pass from Cutter Boley (Carson Smith kick), 13:14. Sun Devils 56–7. Drive: 4 plays, 63 yards, 1:39.
- ASU – David Avit 1-yard run (Carston Kieffer kick), 7:01. Sun Devils 63–7. Drive: 12 plays, 66 yards, 4:42.
- ASU – Jason Brown Jr. 2-yard run (Carston Kieffer kick), 4:34. Sun Devils 70–7. Drive: 3 plays, 36 yards, 1:19.

Fourth quarter

- No scoring plays.

| Statistics | MORG | ASU |
|---|---|---|
| First downs | 11 | 32 |
| Plays–yards | 49–188 | 71–681 |
| Rushes–yards | 25–102 | 35–249 |
| Passing yards | 86 | 432 |
| Passing: comp–att–int | 11–24–0 | 26–36–0 |
| Turnovers | 0 | 1 |
| Time of possession | 30:12 | 29:48 |

| Team | Category | Player | Statistics |
|---|---|---|---|
| Morgan State | Passing | Cameron Edge | 6/15, 54 yards |
| Morgan State | Rushing | Marquez Spells | 1 carry, 39 yards |
| Morgan State | Receiving | Justin Perry | 3 receptions, 21 yards |
| Arizona State | Passing | Cutter Boley | 21/27, 387 yards, 6 TD |
| Arizona State | Rushing | Kyson Brown | 6 carries, 80 yards, TD |
| Arizona State | Receiving | Reed Harris | 6 receptions, 137 yards, 2 TD |

=== VUL (NCCAA) ===
VUL Dragons (NCCAA) (0–2) at Morgan State Bears (1–1) – Game summary

| Quarter | 1 | 2 | 3 | 4 | Total |
|---|---|---|---|---|---|
| Dragons (NCCAA) | 0 | 0 | 0 | 0 | 0 |
| Bears | 14 | 14 | 14 | 13 | 55 |

at Hughes Stadium • Baltimore, Maryland

- Date: September 12
- Game time: 6:00 p.m.
- Game weather: Cloudy • Temperature: 80 °F (27 °C) • Wind: NW at 7 miles per hour (11 km/h)
- Game attendance: 4,869
- Referee: James Brown
- TV announcers (MEAC Network): Phil Schoener (play-by-play) and Emory Hunt (analyst)

Game information

First quarter

- (4:15) MORG – Justin Perry 13-yard pass from Cameron Edge, Alex Amaya kick (Drive: 9 plays, 80 yards, 2:48; Morgan State 7–0)
- (1:00) MORG – Malachi Bryant 15-yard pass from Cameron Edge, Alex Amaya kick (Drive: 2 plays, 40 yards, 0:30; Morgan State 14–0)

Second quarter

- (8:49) MORG – Alex Simmons 10-yard pass from Cameron Edge, Alex Amaya kick (Drive: 5 plays, 73 yards, 4:41; Morgan State 21–0)
- (0:31) MORG – Justin Perry 10-yard pass from Cameron Edge, Alex Amaya kick (Drive: 7 plays, 92 yards, 1:43; Morgan State 28–0)

Third quarter

- (9:44) MORG – Jordan Barnett 6-yard run, Alex Amaya kick (Drive: 9 plays, 73 yards, 5:09; Morgan State 35–0)
- (1:06) MORG – Nick Williams 1-yard pass from Ade Olanegan, Alex Amaya kick (Drive: 11 plays, 69 yards, 4:49; Morgan State 42–0)

Fourth quarter

- (14:49) MORG – Darius Searles 28-yard interception (Morgan State 48–0)
- (10:01) MORG – Maxim Copeland 43-yard pass from Tahj Smith, Gavin Fetty kick (Drive: 7 plays, 53 yards, 3:04; Morgan State 55–0)

| Statistics | VUL | MORG |
|---|---|---|
| First downs | 19 | 22 |
| Plays–yards | 75–330 | 60–522 |
| Rushes–yards | 28–97 | 26–135 |
| Passing yards | 233 | 387 |
| Passing: comp–att–int | 27–47–2 | 27–34–0 |
| Turnovers | 2 | 0 |
| Time of possession | 32:57 | 27:03 |

| Team | Category | Player | Statistics |
|---|---|---|---|
| VUL | Passing | Max Zavala | 16/25, 151 yards, INT |
| VUL | Rushing | Nycholas Underwood | 3 carries, 36 yards |
| VUL | Receiving | Joshua Soyemi | 4 receptions, 40 yards |
| Morgan State | Passing | Cameron Edge | 17/19, 282 yards, 4 TD |
| Morgan State | Rushing | Jordan Barnett | 7 carries, 56 yards, TD |
| Morgan State | Receiving | Justin Perry | 6 receptions, 122 yards, 2 TD |

=== at Towson (The Battle for Greater Baltimore) ===
Morgan State Bears (2–1) at Towson Tigers (0–3) – Game summary

| Quarter | 1 | 2 | 3 | 4 | Total |
|---|---|---|---|---|---|
| Bears | 7 | 17 | 0 | 17 | 41 |
| Tigers | 3 | 3 | 7 | 3 | 16 |

at Johnny Unitas Stadium • Towson, Maryland

- Date: September 19
- Game time: 6:00 p.m.
- Game weather: Cloudy
- Game attendance: 10,900
- Referee: Jeff Pumphrey
- TV announcers (FloFootball): Spiro Morekas (play-by-play) and Gordy Combs (analyst)

Game information

First quarter

- (12:45) TOW – Zaydaan Faridi 25-yard field goal (Drive: 4 plays, 0 yards, 1:15; Towson 3–0)
- (9:14) MORG – Marquez Spells 6-yard pass from Cameron Edge, Alex Amaya kick (Drive: 7 plays, 43 yards, 3:23; Morgan State 7–3)

Second quarter

- (14:34) MORG – Jordan Barnett 3-yard run, Alex Amaya kick (Drive: 9 plays, 80 yards, 3:54; Morgan State 14–3)
- (12:00) MORG – Joseph Towler 40-yard pass from Cameron Edge, Alex Amaya kick (Drive: 1 play, 40 yards, 0:10; Morgan State 21–3)
- (2:54) TOW – Zaydaan Faridi 34-yard field goal (Drive: 17 plays, 58 yards, 8:59; Morgan State 21–6)
- (0:02) MORG – Alex Amaya 27-yard field goal (Drive: 12 plays, 65 yards, 2:52; Morgan State 24–6)

Third quarter

- (6:33) TOW – Aaron Enterline 18-yard pass from Andrew Indorf, Zaydaan Faridi kick (Drive: 5 plays, 55 yards, 1:46; Morgan State 24–13)

Fourth quarter

- (13:22) MORG – Justin Perry 37-yard pass from Dante Archie, Alex Amaya kick (Drive: 5 plays, 80 yards, 2:31; Morgan State 31–13)
- (11:48) TOW – Aaron Enterline 41-yard pass from Andrew Indorf, Zaydaan Faridi kick (Drive: 4 plays, 75 yards, 1:34; Morgan State 31–20)
- (11:33) MORG – Keith Jenkins Jr. 95-yard kickoff return, Alex Amaya kick (Morgan State 38–20)
- (6:08) TOW – CJ Schaeffer 2-yard pass from Andrew Indorf (Drive: 11 plays, 75 yards, 5:25; Morgan State 38–26)
- (3:01) MORG – Alex Amaya 20-yard field goal (Drive: 6 plays, 49 yards, 3:07; Morgan State 41–26)

| Statistics | MORG | TOW |
|---|---|---|
| First downs | 19 | 27 |
| Plays–yards | 52–369 | 76–426 |
| Rushes–yards | 28–123 | 32–61 |
| Passing yards | 246 | 365 |
| Passing: comp–att–int | 15–24–0 | 33–44–1 |
| Turnovers | 1 | 1 |
| Time of possession | 23:14 | 36:46 |

| Team | Category | Player | Statistics |
|---|---|---|---|
| Morgan State | Passing | Cameron Edge | 14/23, 209 yards, 2 TD |
| Morgan State | Rushing | Jordan Barnett | 15 carries, 71 yards, TD |
| Morgan State | Receiving | Joseph Towler | 3 receptions, 76 yards, TD |
| Towson | Passing | Andrew Indorf | 33/43, 365 yards, 3 TD, INT |
| Towson | Rushing | Kemarrion Battles | 8 carries, 37 yards |
| Towson | Receiving | Aaron Enterline | 7 receptions, 92 yards, 2 TD |

=== at Villanova ===
Morgan State Bears (3–1) at Villanova Wildcats (2–3) – Game summary

| Quarter | 1 | 2 | 3 | 4 | Total |
|---|---|---|---|---|---|
| Bears | 0 | 0 | 0 | 0 | 0 |
| Wildcats | 0 | 0 | 0 | 0 | 0 |

at Villanova Stadium • Villanova, Pennsylvania

- Date: October 3
- Game time: 1:00 p.m.
- TV: ESPN+

Game information

First quarter
Second quarter
Third quarter
Fourth quarter

| Statistics | MORG | VILL |
|---|---|---|
| First downs | | |
| Plays–yards | | |
| Rushes–yards | | |
| Passing yards | | |
| Passing: comp–att–int | | |
| Turnovers | | |
| Time of possession | | |

| Team | Category | Player | Statistics |
|---|---|---|---|
| Morgan State | Passing | | |
| Morgan State | Rushing | | |
| Morgan State | Receiving | | |
| Villanova | Passing | | |
| Villanova | Rushing | | |
| Villanova | Receiving | | |

=== Robert Morris ===
Robert Morris Colonials (3–2) at Morgan State Bears (4–1) – Game summary

| Quarter | 1 | 2 | 3 | 4 | Total |
|---|---|---|---|---|---|
| Colonials | 0 | 0 | 0 | 0 | 0 |
| Bears | 0 | 0 | 0 | 0 | 0 |

at Hughes Stadium • Baltimore, Maryland

- Date: October 10
- Game time: 1:00 p.m.

Game information

First quarter
Second quarter
Third quarter
Fourth quarter

| Statistics | RMU | MORG |
|---|---|---|
| First downs | | |
| Plays–yards | | |
| Rushes–yards | | |
| Passing yards | | |
| Passing: comp–att–int | | |
| Turnovers | | |
| Time of possession | | |

| Team | Category | Player | Statistics |
|---|---|---|---|
| Robert Morris | Passing | | |
| Robert Morris | Rushing | | |
| Robert Morris | Receiving | | |
| Morgan State | Passing | | |
| Morgan State | Rushing | | |
| Morgan State | Receiving | | |

=== at Tennessee State ===
No. 24 Morgan State Bears (5–1) at Tennessee State Tigers (1–5) – Game summary

| Quarter | 1 | 2 | 3 | 4 | Total |
|---|---|---|---|---|---|
| No. 24 Bears | 0 | 0 | 0 | 0 | 0 |
| Tigers | 0 | 0 | 0 | 0 | 0 |

at Nissan Stadium • Nashville, Tennessee

- Date: October 17
- Game time: 6:30 p.m.

Game information

First quarter
Second quarter
Third quarter
Fourth quarter

| Statistics | MORG | TNST |
|---|---|---|
| First downs | | |
| Plays–yards | | |
| Rushes–yards | | |
| Passing yards | | |
| Passing: comp–att–int | | |
| Turnovers | | |
| Time of possession | | |

| Team | Category | Player | Statistics |
|---|---|---|---|
| Morgan State | Passing | | |
| Morgan State | Rushing | | |
| Morgan State | Receiving | | |
| Tennessee State | Passing | | |
| Tennessee State | Rushing | | |
| Tennessee State | Receiving | | |

=== Howard (rivalry) ===
Howard Bison (3–4) at Morgan State Bears (5–2) – Game summary

| Quarter | 1 | 2 | 3 | 4 | Total |
|---|---|---|---|---|---|
| Bison | 0 | 0 | 0 | 0 | 0 |
| Bears | 0 | 0 | 0 | 0 | 0 |

at Hughes Stadium • Baltimore, Maryland

- Date: October 24

Game information

First quarter
Second quarter
Third quarter
Fourth quarter

| Statistics | HOW | MORG |
|---|---|---|
| First downs | | |
| Plays–yards | | |
| Rushes–yards | | |
| Passing yards | | |
| Passing: comp–att–int | | |
| Turnovers | | |
| Time of possession | | |

| Team | Category | Player | Statistics |
|---|---|---|---|
| Howard | Passing | | |
| Howard | Rushing | | |
| Howard | Receiving | | |
| Morgan State | Passing | | |
| Morgan State | Rushing | | |
| Morgan State | Receiving | | |

=== No. 25 South Carolina State ===
No. 25 South Carolina State Bulldogs (6–2) at Morgan State Bears (5–3) – Game summary

| Quarter | 1 | 2 | 3 | 4 | Total |
|---|---|---|---|---|---|
| No. 25 Bulldogs | 0 | 0 | 0 | 0 | 0 |
| Bears | 0 | 0 | 0 | 0 | 0 |

at Hughes Stadium • Baltimore, Maryland

- Date: October 29
- Game time: 7:00 p.m.

Game information

First quarter
Second quarter
Third quarter
Fourth quarter

| Statistics | SCST | MORG |
|---|---|---|
| First downs | | |
| Plays–yards | | |
| Rushes–yards | | |
| Passing yards | | |
| Passing: comp–att–int | | |
| Turnovers | | |
| Time of possession | | |

| Team | Category | Player | Statistics |
|---|---|---|---|
| South Carolina State | Passing | | |
| South Carolina State | Rushing | | |
| South Carolina State | Receiving | | |
| Morgan State | Passing | | |
| Morgan State | Rushing | | |
| Morgan State | Receiving | | |

=== at Delaware State ===
Morgan State Bears (5–4) at Delaware State Hornets (5–4) – Game summary

| Quarter | 1 | 2 | 3 | 4 | Total |
|---|---|---|---|---|---|
| Bears | 0 | 0 | 0 | 0 | 0 |
| Hornets | 0 | 0 | 0 | 0 | 0 |

at Alumni Stadium • Dover, Delaware

- Date: November 7
- Game time: 1:00 p.m.

Game information

First quarter
Second quarter
Third quarter
Fourth quarter

| Statistics | MORG | DSU |
|---|---|---|
| First downs | | |
| Plays–yards | | |
| Rushes–yards | | |
| Passing yards | | |
| Passing: comp–att–int | | |
| Turnovers | | |
| Time of possession | | |

| Team | Category | Player | Statistics |
|---|---|---|---|
| Morgan State | Passing | | |
| Morgan State | Rushing | | |
| Morgan State | Receiving | | |
| Delaware State | Passing | | |
| Delaware State | Rushing | | |
| Delaware State | Receiving | | |

=== Norfolk State ===
Norfolk State Spartans (4–6) at Morgan State Bears (5–5) – Game summary

| Quarter | 1 | 2 | 3 | 4 | Total |
|---|---|---|---|---|---|
| Spartans | 0 | 0 | 0 | 0 | 0 |
| Bears | 0 | 0 | 0 | 0 | 0 |

at Hughes Stadium • Baltimore, Maryland

- Date: November 14

Game information

First quarter
Second quarter
Third quarter
Fourth quarter

| Statistics | NORF | MORG |
|---|---|---|
| First downs | | |
| Plays–yards | | |
| Rushes–yards | | |
| Passing yards | | |
| Passing: comp–att–int | | |
| Turnovers | | |
| Time of possession | | |

| Team | Category | Player | Statistics |
|---|---|---|---|
| Norfolk State | Passing | | |
| Norfolk State | Rushing | | |
| Norfolk State | Receiving | | |
| Morgan State | Passing | | |
| Morgan State | Rushing | | |
| Morgan State | Receiving | | |

=== at North Carolina Central ===
Morgan State Bears (6–5) at North Carolina Central Eagles (5–6) – Game summary

| Quarter | 1 | 2 | 3 | 4 | Total |
|---|---|---|---|---|---|
| Bears | 0 | 0 | 0 | 0 | 0 |
| Eagles | 0 | 0 | 0 | 0 | 0 |

at O'Kelly–Riddick Stadium • Durham, North Carolina

- Date: November 21
- Game time: 2:00 p.m.

Game information

First quarter
Second quarter
Third quarter
Fourth quarter

| Statistics | MORG | NCCU |
|---|---|---|
| First downs | | |
| Plays–yards | | |
| Rushes–yards | | |
| Passing yards | | |
| Passing: comp–att–int | | |
| Turnovers | | |
| Time of possession | | |

| Team | Category | Player | Statistics |
|---|---|---|---|
| Morgan State | Passing | | |
| Morgan State | Rushing | | |
| Morgan State | Receiving | | |
| North Carolina Central | Passing | | |
| North Carolina Central | Rushing | | |
| North Carolina Central | Receiving | | |

== Rankings ==
Ranking movements Legend: ██ Increase in ranking ██ Decrease in ranking — = Not ranked RV = Received votes
| | Week | | | | | | | | | | | | | | |
| Poll | Pre | 1 | 2 | 3 | 4 | 5 | 6 | 7 | 8 | 9 | 10 | 11 | 12 | 13 | Final |
|---|---|---|---|---|---|---|---|---|---|---|---|---|---|---|---|
| STATS | — | — | — | — | RV | RV | RV | 24 | RV | — | | | | | |
| Coaches | — | — | — | — | — | — | RV | RV | — | RV | | | | | |
