= 2026 Howard Bison football team =

American college football season

2026 Howard Bison football
- Conference: Mid-Eastern Athletic Conference

Ranking
- BCFP: No. 9
- Record: 5–7 (2–3 MEAC)
- Head coach: Ted White (1st season)
- Offensive coordinator: Jimmie Johnson (1st season)
- Defensive coordinator: Kyshoen Jarrett (2nd season)
- Home stadium: William H. Greene Stadium

2026 Mid-Eastern Athletic Conference football standings
	Conf.			Overall
Team	W		L	W		L
No. 20 South Carolina State $	5	–	0	10	–	2
North Carolina Central	4	–	1	6	–	6
Howard	2	–	3	5	–	7
Delaware State	2	–	3	6	–	6
Morgan State	1	–	4	6	–	6
Norfolk State	1	–	4	5	–	7
$ – Conference champion; As of November 22, 2026; Rankings from STATS Poll

The 2026 Howard Bison football team will represent Howard University as a member of the Mid-Eastern Athletic Conference (MEAC) during the 2026 NCAA Division I FCS football season. The Bison will be led by first-year head coach Ted White and will play their home games at William H. Greene Stadium in Washington, D.C..

== Schedule ==
Date	Time	Opponent	Site	TV	Result	Attendance
August 29	7:30 p.m.	vs. Alabama A&M*	Center Parc Stadium; Atlanta, GA (MEAC/SWAC Challenge)	ABC	W 31–24	17,320
September 5	6:00 p.m.	Richmond*	William H. Greene Stadium; Washington, DC	MEAC Network	L 21–28	3,671
September 12	12:00 p.m.	at No. 5 (FBS) Indiana*	Memorial Stadium; Bloomington, IN	BTN	L 0–55	54,376
September 25	7:00 p.m.	at Rutgers*	SHI Stadium; Piscataway, NJ	BTN	L 7–58	34,466
October 3	3:00 p.m.	vs. Hampton*	Audi Field; Washington, DC (The Real HU / Truth and Service Classic)	HBCU Go	W 27–13	15,389
October 10	1:00 p.m.	at Penn*	Franklin Field; Philadelphia, PA	ESPN+	L 20–24	5,342
October 17	3:30 p.m.	Morehouse*^{†}	William H. Greene Stadium; Washington, DC	ESPN+	W 31–17	9,995
October 24	3:00 p.m.	at Morgan State	Hughes Stadium; Baltimore, MD (rivalry)	ESPN+	W 26–20 ^{OT}	5,762
October 31	2:00 p.m.	at North Carolina Central	O'Kelly–Riddick Stadium; Durham, NC	ESPN+	L 0–34	5,932
November 5	5:00 p.m.	No. 24 South Carolina State	William H. Greene Stadium; Washington, DC	ESPNU	L 28–35	4,827
November 14	1:00 p.m.	Delaware State	William H. Greene Stadium; Washington, DC	ESPN+	W 30–24	4,185
November 21	12:00 p.m.	at Norfolk State	William "Dick" Price Stadium; Norfolk, VA	ESPN+	L 7–35	3,169
*Non-conference game; ^{†}Homecoming; Rankings from STATS Poll released prior to the game; All times are in Eastern time

== Game summaries ==
=== vs. Alabama A&M (MEAC/SWAC Challenge) ===
Howard Bison (0–0) vs. Alabama A&M Bulldogs (0–0) – Game summary

Quarter	1	2	3	4	Total
Bison	10	10	3	8	31
Bulldogs	0	14	0	10	24

at Center Parc Stadium • Atlanta, Georgia

- Date: August 29
- Game time: 6:30 p.m.
- Game weather: Sunny • Temperature: 85 °F (29 °C)
- Game attendance: 17,320
- Referee: Javarro Edwards
- TV announcers (ABC): Tiffany Greene (play-by-play), Jay Walker (analyst), and Quint Kessenich (sideline reporter)

Game information

First quarter

- HOW – Markus Hopson 1-yard pass from Ja'Shawn Scroggins (Matt Conord kick), 7:28. Bison 7–0. Drive: 12 plays, 49 yards, 5:44.
- HOW – Matt Conord 18-yard field goal, 3:14. Bison 10–0. Drive: 8 plays, 45 yards, 3:09.

Second quarter

- HOW – Matt Conord 19-yard field goal, 13:31. Bison 13–0. Drive: 9 plays, 76 yards, 2:45.
- AAMU – Jarel Williams 26-yard pass from Cornelious Brown IV (David Faulk kick), 8:39. Bison 13–7. Drive: 4 plays, 69 yards, 0:56.
- HOW – Nathanial Clark 4-yard pass from Ja'Shawn Scroggins (Matt Conord kick), 4:23. Bison 20–7. Drive: 8 plays, 68 yards, 4:01.
- AAMU – Imari Conley 14-yard pass from Cornelious Brown IV (David Faulk kick), 2:13. Bison 20–14. Drive: 4 plays, 83 yards, 2:05.

Third quarter

- HOW – Matt Conord 31-yard field goal, 1:52. Bison 23–14. Drive: 10 plays, 46 yards, 4:49.

Fourth quarter

- AAMU – Cornelious Brown IV 4-yard run (David Faulk kick), 13:10. Bison 23–21. Drive: 11 plays, 80 yards, 3:36.
- AAMU – David Faulk 32-yard field goal, 7:49. Bulldogs 24–23. Drive: 10 plays, 32 yards, 3:45.
- HOW – Se'Quan Osborne 51-yard pass from Ja'Shawn Scroggins (Ja'Shawn Scroggins–Nathanial Clark pass), 2:41. Bison 31–24. Drive: 6 plays, 83 yards, 2:36.

Statistics	HOW	AAMU
First downs	21	19
Plays–yards	78–436	60–405
Rushes–yards	40–114	19–151
Passing yards	322	254
Passing: comp–att–int	20–38–0	25–41–1
Turnovers	1	2
Time of possession	36:04	23:56

Team	Category	Player	Statistics
Howard	Passing	Ja'Shawn Scroggins	19/36, 315 yards, 3 TD
Howard	Rushing	Ja'Shawn Scroggins	15 carries, 49 yards
Howard	Receiving	Semaj Pierre	2 receptions, 68 yards
Alabama A&M	Passing	Cornelious Brown IV	25/41, 254 yards, 2 TD, INT
Alabama A&M	Rushing	Maurice Edwards IV	7 carries, 57 yards
Alabama A&M	Receiving	Jarel Williams	4 receptions, 72 yards, TD

=== Richmond ===
Richmond Spiders (1–0) at Howard Bison (1–0) – Game summary

Quarter	1	2	3	4	Total
Spiders	13	7	8	0	28
Bison	0	0	14	7	21

at William H. Greene Stadium • Washington, DC

- Date: September 5
- Game time: 6:00 p.m.
- Game weather: Cloudy • Temperature: 80 °F (27 °C) • Wind: N at 6 miles per hour (9.7 km/h)
- Game attendance: 3,671
- Referee: Ryan Massey
- TV announcers (MEAC Network): Trevin A. Jones (play-by-play) and Nate Henry (analyst)

Game information

First quarter

- (13:06) RICH - Ashten Snelsire 15-yard pass to Bryce Allen, Kyle Bitsko kick blocked (Drive: 2 Plays, 20 yards, 0:43; RICH 6–0)
- (1:50) RICH - Aziz Foster-Powell 1-yard run, Kyle Bitsko kick (Drive: 7 Plays, 63 yards, 3:45; RICH 13–0)

Second quarter

- (12:25) RICH - Ashten Snelsire 42-yard pass to Quanye Veney, Kyle Bitsko kick (Drive: 7 Plays, 66 yards, 2:42; RICH 20–0)

Third quarter

- (11:53) HOW - Gabe Howard 0-yard fumble return, Matt Conord kick (RICH 20–7)
- (7:00) HOW - Ja'Shawn Scroggins 30-yard pass to Antonio Hunter, Matt Conord kick (Drive: 9 Plays, 84 yards, 3:48; RICH 20–14)
- (1:57) RICH - Ashten Snelsire 29-yard pass to Sean Clarke, Ashten Snelsire run for two-point conversion (Drive: 2 Plays, 29 yards, 0:55; RICH 28–14)

Fourth quarter

- (11:35) HOW - Billy Roberson II 1-yard run, Matt Conord kick (Drive: 14 Plays, 75 yards, 5:22; RICH 28–21)

Statistics	RICH	HOW
First downs	17	14
Plays–yards	67–300	63–240
Rushes–yards	32–39	35–131
Passing yards	261	109
Passing: Comp–Att–Int	19–35–0	9–28–1
Turnovers	1	2
Time of possession	32:30	27:30

Team	Category	Player	Statistics
Richmond	Passing	Ashten Snelsire	19/35, 261 yards, 3 TD
Richmond	Rushing	Jamaal Brown	9 carries, 36 yards
Richmond	Receiving	Sean Clarke	7 receptions, 80 yards, TD
Howard	Passing	Ja'Shawn Scroggins	9/28, 109 yards, TD
Howard	Rushing	Billy Roberson II	7 carries, 44 yards, TD
Howard	Receiving	Antonio Hunter	2 receptions, 43 yards, TD

=== at No. 5 (FBS) Indiana ===
Howard Bison (1–1) at No. 5 (FBS) Indiana Hoosiers (1–0) – Game summary

Quarter	1	2	3	4	Total
Bison	0	0	0	0	0
No. 5 (FBS) Hoosiers	20	21	14	0	55

at Memorial Stadium • Bloomington, Indiana

- Date: September 12
- Game time: 12:00 p.m.
- Game weather: Cloudy • Temperature: 75 °F (24 °C) • Wind: S at 5 miles per hour (8.0 km/h)
- Game attendance: 54,376
- Referee: Jeremy Valentine
- TV announcers (BTN): Jeff Levering (play-by-play), Jake Butt (analyst), and Brooke Fletcher (sideline reporter)

Game information

First quarter

- IU - Charlie Becker 34-yard pass from Josh Hoover (Paddy McAteer kick), 12:56. Hoosiers 7-0 Drive: 5 plays, 56 yards, 1:55.
- IU - Charlie Becker 6-yard pass from Josh Hoover, 4:16. Hoosiers 13-0 Drive:10 plays, 86 yards, 4:54.
- IU - Shazz Preston 39-yard pass from Josh Hoover (Paddy McAteer kick), 1:34. Hoosiers 20-0 Drive: 4 plays, 70 yards, 1:51.

Second quarter

- Charlie Becker 41-yard pass from Josh Hoover (Paddy McAteer kick), 6:07. Hoosiers 27-0 Drive: 8 plays, 70 yards, 4:36.
- Rolijah Hardy 19-yard interception return (Paddy McAteer kick), 4:39. Hoosiers 34-0
- Turbo Richard 14-yard run (Paddy McAteer kick), 1:30. Hoosiers 41-0 Drive: 8 plays, 48 yards, 1:20.

Third quarter

- Davion Chandler 3-yard pass from Grant Wilson (Paddy McAteer kick), 7:53. Hoosiers 48-0 Drive: 9 plays, 68 yards, 5:14.
- Nick Marsh 51-yard pass from Grant Wilson (Paddy McAteer kick), 6:03. Hoosiers 55-0 Drive: 1 play, 51 yards, 0:06

Fourth quarter

- No scoring plays.

Statistics	HOW	IU
First downs	4	24
Plays–yards	47–57	62–505
Rushes–yards	27–13	46–296
Passing yards	44	209
Passing: comp–att–int	10–20–1	9–16–0
Turnovers	1	1
Time of possession	26:24	33:36

Team	Category	Player	Statistics
Howard	Passing	Ja'Shawn Scroggins	8/15, 43 yards, INT
Howard	Rushing	Billy Roberson II	7 carries, 14 yards
Howard	Receiving	Derrick Miller	1 reception, 15 yards
Indiana	Passing	Josh Hoover	6/11, 145 yards, 4 TD
Indiana	Rushing	Lee Beebe Jr.	16 carries, 112 yards
Indiana	Receiving	Charlie Becker	3 receptions, 81 yards, 3 TD

=== at Rutgers (FBS) ===
Howard Bison (1–2) at Rutgers Scarlet Knights (0–3) – Game summary

Quarter	1	2	3	4	Total
Bison (FCS)	7	0	0	0	7
Scarlet Knights	21	20	10	7	58

at SHI Stadium • Piscataway, New Jersey

- Date: September 25
- Game time: 7:00 p.m.
- Game weather: Cloudy • Temperature: 69 °F (21 °C) • Wind: NE at 19 miles per hour (31 km/h)
- Game attendance: 34,466
- Referee: Mark Kluczynski
- TV announcers (BTN): Chris Vosters, Anthony Herron and Dannie Rogers

Game information

First quarter
Second quarter
Third quarter
Fourth quarter

Statistics	HOW	RUTG
First downs	9	29
Plays–yards	48–184	72–534
Rushes–yards	29–133	47–266
Passing yards	51	268
Passing: comp–att–int	8–19–2	16–25–0
Turnovers	3	0
Time of possession	23:16	36:44

Team	Category	Player	Statistics
Howard	Passing	Ja'Shawn Scroggins	5/14, 38 yards, 2 INT
Howard	Rushing	Eden James	7 carries, 116 yards, TD
Howard	Receiving	Zaden Jackson	4 receptions, 33 yards
Rutgers	Passing	Dylan Lonergan	12/17, 214 yards, 2 TD
Rutgers	Rushing	Antwan Raymond	16 carries, 140 yards, 3 TD
Rutgers	Receiving	KJ Duff	5 receptions, 131 yards, TD

=== vs. Hampton (The Real HU) ===
Howard Bison (1–3) vs. Hampton Pirates (1–4) – Game summary

Quarter	1	2	3	4	Total
Bison	0	0	0	0	0
Pirates	0	0	0	0	0

at Audi Field • Washington, DC

- Date: October 3
- Game time: 3:00 p.m.
- TV: HBCU GO

Game information

First quarter
Second quarter
Third quarter
Fourth quarter

Statistics	HOW	HAMP
First downs		
Plays–yards		
Rushes–yards		
Passing yards		
Passing: comp–att–int		
Turnovers		
Time of possession		

Team	Category	Player	Statistics
Howard	Passing		
Howard	Rushing		
Howard	Receiving		
Hampton	Passing		
Hampton	Rushing		
Hampton	Receiving		

=== at Penn ===
Howard Bison (2–3) at Penn Quakers (1–2) – Game summary

Quarter	1	2	3	4	Total
Bison	7	10	3	0	20
Quakers	3	7	0	14	24

at Franklin Field • Philadelphia, Pennsylvania

- Date: October 10
- Game time: 1:00 p.m.
- Game weather: Sunny • Temperature: 70 °F (21 °C) • Wind: 11 miles per hour (18 km/h)
- Game attendance: 5,342
- Referee: Bill McKeever
- TV announcers (ESPN+): Joe Tordy, Joe Valerio and Joey Lindstrom

Game information

First quarter

- HOW – Ja'Shawn Scroggins 1-yard run (Matt Conord kick), 5:06. Bison 7–0. Drive: 14 plays, 88 yards, 7:00.
- PENN – Mason Walters 20-yard field goal, 2:00. Bison 7–3. Drive: 9 plays, 55 yards, 2:59.

Second quarter

- PENN – Jack Donnelly 12-yard pass from Karson Siqueiros-Lasky (Mason Walters kick), 7:20. Quakers 10–7. Drive: 9 plays, 44 yards, 5:20.
- HOW – Zaden Jackson 30-yard pass from Ja'Shawn Scroggins (Matt Conord kick), 3:30. Bison 14–10. Drive: 4 plays, 40 yards, 1:22.
- HOW – Matt Conord 20-yard field goal, 0:00. Bison 17–10. Drive: 13 plays, 58 yards, 3:18.

Third quarter

- HOW – Matt Conord 34-yard field goal, 8:41. Bison 20–10. Drive: 14 plays, 71 yards, 6:10.

Fourth quarter

- PENN – Karson Siqueiros-Lasky 6-yard pass from Isaac Lee (Mason Walters kick), 11:55. Bison 20–17. Drive: 13 plays, 87 yards, 6:35.
- PENN – Isaac Lee 13-yard pass from Karson Siqueiros-Lasky (Mason Walters kick), 0:57. Bison 24–20. Drive: 9 plays, 52 yards, 2:15.

Statistics	HOW	PENN
First downs	18	19
Plays–yards	66–247	66–365
Rushes–yards	33–107	22–70
Passing yards	140	295
Passing: comp–att–int	13–33–1	26–44–1
Turnovers	1	2
Time of possession	29:52	30:08

Team	Category	Player	Statistics
Howard	Passing	Ja'Shawn Scroggins	13/33, 140 yards, TD, INT
Howard	Rushing	Billy Robertson	8 carries, 51 yards
Howard	Receiving	Semaj Pierre	6 receptions, 55 yards
Penn	Passing	Karson Siqueiros-Lasky	19/29, 229 yards, 2 TD, INT
Penn	Rushing	Miles Teodecki	2 carries, 48 yards
Penn	Receiving	Ronan Johannson	7 receptions, 113 yards

=== Morehouse (DII) ===
Morehouse Maroon Tigers (3–4) at Howard Bison (2–4) – Game summary

Quarter	1	2	3	4	Total
Maroon Tigers (DII)	0	0	0	0	0
Bison	0	0	0	0	0

at William H. Greene Stadium • Washington, DC

- Date: October 17

Game information

First quarter
Second quarter
Third quarter
Fourth quarter

Statistics	MORH	HOW
First downs		
Plays–yards		
Rushes–yards		
Passing yards		
Passing: comp–att–int		
Turnovers		
Time of possession		

Team	Category	Player	Statistics
Morehouse	Passing		
Morehouse	Rushing		
Morehouse	Receiving		
Howard	Passing		
Howard	Rushing		
Howard	Receiving		

=== at Morgan State (rivalry) ===
Howard Bison (3–4) at Morgan State Bears (5–2) – Game summary

Quarter	1	2	3	4	Total
Bison	0	0	0	0	0
Bears	0	0	0	0	0

at Hughes Stadium • Baltimore, Maryland

- Date: October 24

Game information

First quarter
Second quarter
Third quarter
Fourth quarter

Statistics	HOW	MORG
First downs		
Plays–yards		
Rushes–yards		
Passing yards		
Passing: comp–att–int		
Turnovers		
Time of possession		

Team	Category	Player	Statistics
Howard	Passing		
Howard	Rushing		
Howard	Receiving		
Morgan State	Passing		
Morgan State	Rushing		
Morgan State	Receiving		

=== at North Carolina Central ===
Howard Bison (4–4) at North Carolina Central Eagles (3–5) – Game summary

Quarter	1	2	3	4	Total
Bison	0	0	0	0	0
Eagles	0	0	0	0	0

at O'Kelly–Riddick Stadium • Durham, North Carolina

- Date: October 31
- Game time: 2:00 p.m.

Game information

First quarter
Second quarter
Third quarter
Fourth quarter

Statistics	HOW	NCCU
First downs		
Plays–yards		
Rushes–yards		
Passing yards		
Passing: comp–att–int		
Turnovers		
Time of possession		

Team	Category	Player	Statistics
Howard	Passing		
Howard	Rushing		
Howard	Receiving		
North Carolina Central	Passing		
North Carolina Central	Rushing		
North Carolina Central	Receiving		

=== No. 24 South Carolina State ===
No. 24 South Carolina State Bulldogs (7–2) at Howard Bison (4–5) – Game summary

Quarter	1	2	3	4	Total
No. 24 Bulldogs	0	0	0	0	0
Bison	0	0	0	0	0

at William H. Greene Stadium • Washington, DC

- Date: November 5
- Game time: 5:00 p.m.

Game information

First quarter
Second quarter
Third quarter
Fourth quarter

Statistics	SCST	HOW
First downs		
Plays–yards		
Rushes–yards		
Passing yards		
Passing: comp–att–int		
Turnovers		
Time of possession		

Team	Category	Player	Statistics
South Carolina State	Passing		
South Carolina State	Rushing		
South Carolina State	Receiving		
Howard	Passing		
Howard	Rushing		
Howard	Receiving		

=== Delaware State ===
Delaware State Hornets (6–4) at Howard Bison (4–6) – Game summary

Quarter	1	2	3	4	Total
Hornets	0	0	0	0	0
Bison	0	0	0	0	0

at William H. Greene Stadium • Washington, DC

- Date: November 14

Game information

First quarter
Second quarter
Third quarter
Fourth quarter

Statistics	DSU	HOW
First downs		
Plays–yards		
Rushes–yards		
Passing yards		
Passing: comp–att–int		
Turnovers		
Time of possession		

Team	Category	Player	Statistics
Delaware State	Passing		
Delaware State	Rushing		
Delaware State	Receiving		
Howard	Passing		
Howard	Rushing		
Howard	Receiving		

=== at Norfolk State ===
Howard Bison (5–6) at Norfolk State Spartans (4–7) – Game summary

Quarter	1	2	3	4	Total
Bison	0	0	0	0	0
Spatans	0	0	0	0	0

at William "Dick" Price Stadium • Norfolk, Virginia

- Date: November 21
- Game time: 12:00 p.m.

Game information

First quarter
Second quarter
Third quarter
Fourth quarter

Statistics	HOW	NORF
First downs		
Plays–yards		
Rushes–yards		
Passing yards		
Passing: comp–att–int		
Turnovers		
Time of possession		

Team	Category	Player	Statistics
Howard	Passing		
Howard	Rushing		
Howard	Receiving		
Norfolk State	Passing		
Norfolk State	Rushing		
Norfolk State	Receiving		
