= 2026 NCAA Division I FCS football season =

American college football season

2026 NCAA Division I FCS season

Regular season
- Number of teams: 128

Playoff
- Championship site: FirstBank Stadium, Nashville, Tennessee

NCAA Division I FCS football seasons
- «2025

The 2026 NCAA Division I FCS football season, part of college football in the United States, is organized by the National Collegiate Athletic Association (NCAA) at the Division I Football Championship Subdivision (FCS) level. The regular season began on August 27 and will end in November. The postseason will begin in November and end in January 2027 with the 2027 NCAA Division I Football Championship Game at FirstBank Stadium in Nashville, Tennessee.

== Notable headlines ==
- January 23 – The NCAA approved a rule change to allow teams to add commercial logos from sponsorships on uniforms, equipment and apparel. Teams may add two logos, each up to four inches in size, to uniforms, with one additional logo on equipment, for regular season games.
- April 8 – Ross Dellenger of Yahoo Sports reported that the NCAA was considering a new athletic eligibility framework. Under the proposal, NCAA athletes would have five full years of eligibility, starting on their 19th birthday or high school graduation, whichever is sooner. No redshirting would be allowed, even for medical reasons. Existing eligibility waivers for military service, religious missions, or (for women) maternity leave, would not be affected.
- June 5 – The NCAA Division I Cabinet slightly modified the age-based eligibility proposal, addressing concerns raised by the men's basketball and men's ice hockey communities, as well as the service academies. Under the new proposal, expected to be voted on by the end of June, athletes' eligibility clocks would start upon their full-time college enrollment or the start of the academic year following their 19th birthday, whichever is sooner.
- June 18 – The Ohio Valley Conference announced its football teams would return to competing under the OVC name and branding, following three years of competing under the OVC–Big South Football Association, a merger between the OVC's football league and the remaining two Big South Conference football members. Those two, Charleston Southern and Gardner–Webb, would continue playing in the league as OVC affiliate members.
- June 23 – The Division I Cabinet unanimously approved the age-based eligibility proposal as modified earlier that month, officially taking effect with the end of the Cabinet's meeting the next day. Students enrolling full-time in college for the first time in 2026, plus those who had remaining eligibility under previous rules at the end of 2025–26, can use whichever model is most advantageous to them. Those who exhausted their eligibility under previous rules in 2025–26 will not receive any additional eligibility, even if they initially enrolled in 2022–23 (giving them four years of eligibility).
- June 24 – On the same day the new age-based eligibility model took effect, a group of 15 college basketball players, all of whom graduated from high school in 2022 and exhausted their eligibility under the previous rules in 2025–26, filed suit in Hamilton County, Ohio challenging the application of the new model to their high school cohort. Other suits on similar grounds were expected to be filed in other states.
- July 31 – Rulings in two separate court cases undercut the NCAA's planned "five for five" eligibility model as applied to 2022 high school graduates. First, a Tennessee state court judge granted a temporary injunction that allowed 19 basketball players in that class an extra season of eligibility. Several hours later, a federal judge in Colorado issued a preliminary injunction that applied to all members of the high school class of 2022 who had exhausted athletic eligibility, regardless of sport, and also provided those individuals an extra season of eligibility. The NCAA was expected to appeal.

== Conference changes and new programs ==
NB: This list does not include members of the OVC–Big South Football Association that continue to play football in the Ohio Valley Conference, or members of the football-only United Athletic Conference that continue to play football in the all-sports UAC.

School	2025 conference	2026 conference	Ref
Chicago State	New program	Independent	
North Dakota State	MVFC	Mountain West (FBS)	
Sacramento State	Big Sky	MAC (FBS)	
Sacred Heart	Independent	CAA Football	
Saint Francis	NEC	PAC (Division III)	
Southern Utah	UAC	Big Sky	
Tennessee Tech	OVC–Big South	SoCon	
Utah Tech	UAC	Big Sky	
Villanova	CAA Football	Patriot League	
William & Mary	CAA Football	Patriot League	
West Florida	GSC (Division II)	UAC	

== Kickoff games ==
The regular season started on Saturday, August 29 in Week 0:

Date	Visiting team	Home team	Site	Result	Attendance	Ref.
August 29	East Texas A&M	No. 21 Mercer	Five Star Stadium • Macon, Georgia (FCS Kickoff)	15–23	8,378	
August 29	Howard	Alabama A&M	Center Parc Stadium • Atlanta, Georgia (MEAC/SWAC Challenge)	31–24	17,320	
August 29	Jackson State	Tennessee State	FirstBank Stadium • Nashville, Tennessee (John Merritt Classic)	24–26	32,467	
^{#}Rankings from STATS poll released prior to the game.

== Regular season top 10 matchups ==
Date	Visiting team	Home team	Site	Result	Attendance	Ref.
September 19	No. 9 Youngstown State	No. 2 South Dakota State	Dana J. Dykhouse Stadium • Brookings, South Dakota	20–27	18,541	
September 26	No. 5 Montana	No. 10 UC Davis	UC Davis Health Stadium • Davis, CA	62–22	11,238	
October 10	No. 3 Tarleton State	No. 9 Austin Peay	Fortera Stadium • Clarksville, TN	40–32	8,167	
October 24	No. 6 North Dakota	No. 8 South Dakota	DakotaDome • Vermillion, SD (Sitting Bull Trophy)	23–26 ^{OT}	8,241	
October 31	No. 9 North Dakota	No. 4 Youngstown State	Stambaugh Stadium • Youngstown, OH	28–31	9,415	
October 31	No. 6 South Dakota	No. 5 South Dakota State	Dana J. Dykhouse Stadium • Brookings, SD (Interstate Series)	21–31	18,902	
November 21	No. 8 Montana	No. 2 Montana State	Bobcat Stadium • Bozeman, MT (Brawl of the Wild)			
^{#}Rankings from STATS poll released prior to the game.

== Upsets ==
=== Regular season upsets ===
This section lists unranked teams defeating STATS poll-ranked teams during the season.

Date	Visiting team	Home team	Site	Result	Attendance	Ref.
August 27	No. 16 Southern Illinois	West Florida	Pen Air Field • Pensacola, FL	31–34	6,124	
August 27	Houston Christian	No. 19 Southeastern Louisiana	Strawberry Stadium • Hammond, LA	34–28	4,199	
August 27	Central Arkansas	No. 23 UT Martin	Graham Stadium • Martin, TN	36–24	5,516	
August 28	William & Mary	No. 8 Villanova	Villanova Stadium • Villanova, PA	35–32	5,221	
September 6	No. 24 Western Carolina	Campbell	Barker–Lane Stadium • Buies Creek, NC	19–28	4,212	
September 12	Furman	No. 18 Mercer	Five Star Stadium • Macon, GA	20–13	5,079	
September 19	No. 8 Rhode Island	Stony Brook	Kenneth P. LaValle Stadium • Stony Brook, NY	24–56	5,632	
September 19	Fordham	No. 21 William & Mary	Zable Stadium • Williamsburg, VA	52–27	5,079	
September 26	No. 3 Illinois State	Northern Iowa	UNI-Dome • Cedar Falls, IA	21–28	9,016	
September 26	No. 17 Yale	Cornell	Schoellkopf Field • Ithaca, NY	25–38	12,542	
September 26	No. 19 Rhode Island	North Carolina A&T	Truist Stadium • Greensboro, NC	18–22	11,336	
September 26	Colgate	No. 23 Villanova	Villanova Stadium • Villanova, PA	28–21	6,753	
October 2	No. 1 Montana State	Idaho	Kibbie Dome • Moscow, ID	34–35	9,231	
October 3	No. 9 Tennessee Tech	Western Carolina	E. J. Whitmire Stadium • Cullowhee, NC	20–44	9,145	
October 3	The Citadel	No. 15 South Carolina State	Oliver C. Dawson Stadium • Orangeburg, SC	34–31	11,250	
October 3	No. 17 West Florida	Abilene Christian	Wildcat Stadium • Orangeburg, SC	7–35	7,018	
October 10	No. 4 North Dakota	Northern Iowa	UNI-Dome • Cedar Falls, IA	17–24	11,487	
October 10	Cal Poly	No. 16 Idaho State	ICCU Dome • Pocatello, ID	25–24	9,483	
October 10	No. 19 Richmond	Fordham	Coffey Field • The Bronx, NY	14–20	1,825	
October 10	No. 21 South Carolina State	Charleston Southern	Buccaneer Field • Charleston, SC	39–49	334	
October 10	No. 22 Jackson State	Grambling State	Eddie G. Robinson Memorial Stadium • Grambling, LA	38–45	15,434	
October 17	No. 4 Lehigh	Cornell	Schoellkopf Field • Ithaca, NY	38–48	9,198	
October 17	Idaho	No. 7 Montana	Washington–Grizzly Stadium • Missoula, MT (Little Brown Stein)	42–35	26,567	
October 17	No. 10 Lamar	Southeastern Louisiana	Strawberry Stadium • Hammond, LA	31–34	6,673	
October 17	No. 14 UC Davis	Southern Utah	Eccles Coliseum • Cedar City, UT	17–38	3,136	
October 17	No. 21 Idaho State	Weber State	Stewart Stadium • Ogden, UT	20–27	8,428	
October 17	Georgetown	No. 22 Colgate	Andy Kerr Stadium • Hamilton, NY	27–17	2,369	
October 17	No. 24 Morgan State	Tennessee State	Nissan Stadium • Nashville, TN	16–25	11,347	
October 17	Rhode Island	No. 25 Yale	Yale Bowl • New Haven, CT	41–23	4,315	
October 24	No. 11 Lehigh	Villanova	Villanova Stadium • Villanova, PA	18–24	5,451	
October 24	No. 21 Northern Iowa	Southern Illinois	Saluki Stadium • Carbondale, IL	17–20	5,206	
October 24	No. 24 Jackson State	Bethune–Cookman	Daytona Stadium • Daytona Beach, FL	21–24	4,732	
October 30	No. 13 Harvard	Dartmouth	Memorial Field • Hanover, NH (rivalry)	14–24	4,074	
October 31	No. 12 Campbell	Albany	Tom & Mary Casey Stadium • Albany, NY	35–45	3,301	
October 31	No. 21 Richmond	Holy Cross	Fitton Field • Worcester, MA	14–33	7,769	
November 7	Samford	No. 19т East Tennessee State	William B. Greene Jr. Stadium • Johnson City, TN	37–35	7,845	
November 7	No. 21 Albany	Bryant	Beirne Stadium • Smithfield, RI	7–31	3,262	
November 14	Merrimack	No. 14 Monmouth	Kessler Stadium • West Long Branch, NJ	29–28	2,464	
November 14	No. 16 Campbell	Elon	Rhodes Stadium • Elon, NC	24–28	6,791	
November 14	No. 25 Princeton	Yale	Yale Bowl • New Haven, CT (rivalry)	0–28	6,440	
^{#}Rankings from STATS poll released prior to the game.

== FCS teams wins over FBS teams ==
- Italics denotes FBS teams.

Date	Visiting team	Home team	Site	Result	Attendance	Ref.
September 5	No. 5 Tarleton State	Bowling Green	Doyt Perry Stadium • Bowling Green, OH	20–13	13,367	
September 5	The Citadel	Charlotte	Jerry Richardson Stadium • Charlotte, NC	43–41 ^{3OT}	13,274	
September 5	No. 23 Idaho State	Utah State	Maverik Stadium • Logan, UT	29–17	20,723	
September 12	No. 5 Illinois State	Northern Illinois	Huskie Stadium • DeKalb, IL	28–24	17,582	
September 12	No. 1 Montana State	Nevada	Mackay Stadium • Reno, NV	20–7	21,679	
September 19	Southeastern Louisiana	Louisiana–Monroe	Malone Stadium • Monroe, LA	38–35	13,211	
^{#}Rankings from STATS poll released prior to the game.

== Non-DI team wins over FCS teams ==
Italics denotes non-DI teams.

Date	Visiting team	Home team	Site	Result	Attendance	Ref.
August 27	Ohio Dominican ^{(D-II)}	Morehead State	Phil Simms Stadium • Morehead, Kentucky	42–40 ^{3OT}	7,376	
August 27	Concord ^{(D-II)}	Davidson	Davidson College Stadium • Davidson, North Carolina	41–35	2,346	
August 27	South Dakota Mines ^{(D-II)}	Drake	Drake Stadium • Des Moines, Iowa	38–35	3,350	
August 27	Louisiana Christian ^{(NAIA)}	Northwestern State	Harry Turpin Stadium • Natchitoches, Louisiana	42–37	6,438	
August 29	Roosevelt ^{(D-II)}	Chicago State	SeatGeek Stadium • Bridgeview, Illinois	44–28	2,395	
September 19	Delta State ^{(D-II)}	Mississippi Valley State	Rice–Totten Stadium • Itta Bena, MS	21–6	1,575	
^{#}Rankings from STATS poll released prior to the game.

== Conference standings ==
2026 Big Sky Conference football standings
	Conf.			Overall
Team	W		L	W		L
No. 2 Montana State $^	8	–	1	11	–	1
No. 15 Weber State	7	–	2	8	–	4
No. 12 Northern Arizona	7	–	2	9	–	3
No. 8 Montana	6	–	3	8	–	4
No. 23 UC Davis	6	–	3	8	–	4
Idaho	5	–	4	5	–	7
Southern Utah	4	–	4	6	–	6
No. 25 Idaho State	4	–	5	7	–	5
Cal Poly	3	–	6	4	–	8
Portland State	3	–	6	3	–	9
Eastern Washington	2	–	7	3	–	9
Northern Colorado	2	–	7	3	–	9
Utah Tech	1	–	8	1	–	11
$ – Conference champion; ^ – FCS playoff participant; As of November 22, 2026; Rankings from STATS Poll

2026 Coastal Athletic Association Football Conference standings
	Conf.			Overall
Team	W		L	W		L
No. 18 Monmouth $^	8	–	0	9	–	3
Bryant	6	–	2	8	–	4
Albany	6	–	2	8	–	4
No. 22 Campbell	5	–	3	8	–	4
North Carolina A&T	4	–	4	5	–	7
Towson	4	–	4	4	–	8
Sacred Heart	4	–	4	5	–	6
New Hampshire	4	–	4	5	–	7
Stony Brook	4	–	4	6	–	6
Elon	4	–	4	6	–	6
Rhode Island	2	–	6	5	–	7
Maine	1	–	7	1	–	10
Hampton	0	–	8	1	–	11
$ – Conference champion; ^ – FCS playoff participant; As of November 22, 2026; Rankings from STATS Poll

2026 Ivy League football standings
	Conf.			Overall
Team	W		L	W		L
No. 17 Harvard $^	5	–	2	8	–	2
Yale	4	–	3	6	–	4
Princeton	4	–	3	6	–	4
Dartmouth	4	–	3	5	–	5
Brown	4	–	3	6	–	4
Penn	3	–	4	5	–	5
Columbia	2	–	5	5	–	5
Cornell	2	–	5	4	–	6
$ – Conference champion; ^ – FCS playoff participant; As of November 22, 2026; Rankings from STATS Poll

2026 Mid-Eastern Athletic Conference football standings
	Conf.			Overall
Team	W		L	W		L
No. 20 South Carolina State $	5	–	0	10	–	2
North Carolina Central	4	–	1	6	–	6
Howard	2	–	3	5	–	7
Delaware State	2	–	3	6	–	6
Morgan State	1	–	4	6	–	6
Norfolk State	1	–	4	5	–	7
$ – Conference champion; As of November 22, 2026; Rankings from STATS Poll

2026 Missouri Valley Football Conference standings
	Conf.			Overall
Team	W		L	W		L
No. 3 South Dakota State $^	7	–	1	10	–	2
No. 6 Youngstown State ^	6	–	2	8	–	3
No. 7 South Dakota ^	6	–	2	9	–	3
No. 10 North Dakota ^	5	–	3	8	–	4
No. 11 Illinois State ^	4	–	4	8	–	4
Southern Illinois	3	–	5	5	–	7
Northern Iowa	3	–	5	4	–	7
Murray State	2	–	6	3	–	9
Indiana State	0	–	8	2	–	10
$ – Conference champion; ^ – FCS playoff participant; As of November 22, 2026; Rankings from STATS Poll

2026 Northeast Conference football standings
	Conf.			Overall
Team	W		L	W		L
LIU +^	5	–	2	5	–	7
Duquesne +	5	–	2	6	–	5
Central Connecticut +	5	–	2	6	–	5
Robert Morris	4	–	3	6	–	6
Wagner	3	–	4	4	–	8
Stonehill	3	–	4	4	–	8
New Haven*	2	–	5	3	–	9
Mercyhurst*	1	–	6	2	–	10
+ – Conference co-champions; ^ – FCS playoff participant; * – Ineligible for NEC title and FCS postseason play due to transition from NCAA Division II.; As of November 22, 2026; Rankings from STATS Poll

2026 Ohio Valley Conference football standings
	Conf.			Overall
Team	W		L	W		L
Western Illinois $^	6	–	1	8	–	4
UT Martin	5	–	2	6	–	6
Southeast Missouri State	5	–	2	7	–	5
Lindenwood	4	–	3	5	–	6
Eastern Illinois	3	–	4	4	–	8
Tennessee State	2	–	5	4	–	8
Gardner–Webb	2	–	5	3	–	9
Charleston Southern	1	–	6	4	–	8
$ – Conference champion; ^ – FCS playoff participant; As of November 22, 2026; Rankings from STATS Poll

2026 Patriot League football standings
	Conf.			Overall
Team	W		L	W		L
No. 16 Lehigh $^	8	–	1	10	–	2
Holy Cross	7	–	2	7	–	5
Colgate	6	–	3	7	–	5
Villanova	6	–	3	7	–	5
Richmond	5	–	4	7	–	5
Fordham	4	–	5	4	–	8
Lafayette	3	–	5	4	–	7
Georgetown	3	–	5	3	–	7
William & Mary	2	–	7	4	–	8
Bucknell	0	–	9	1	–	11
$ – Conference champion; ^ – FCS playoff participant; As of November 22, 2026; Rankings from STATS Poll

2026 Pioneer Football League standings
	Conf.			Overall
Team	W		L	W		L
No. 24 Dayton +^	7	–	1	10	–	1
Butler +	7	–	1	10	–	2
St. Thomas (MN)	6	–	2	9	–	3
San Diego	5	–	3	6	–	5
Marist	5	–	3	6	–	6
Valparaiso	4	–	4	5	–	6
Presbyterian	3	–	5	4	–	7
Drake	3	–	5	3	–	8
Davidson	2	–	6	4	–	8
Morehead State	2	–	6	3	–	9
Stetson	0	–	8	1	–	11
+ – Conference co-champions; ^ – FCS playoff participant; As of November 22, 2026; Rankings from STATS Poll

2026 Southern Conference football standings
	Conf.			Overall
Team	W		L	W		L
No. 9 Mercer $^	7	–	1	10	–	2
No. 13 Tennessee Tech	6	–	2	9	–	3
Chattanooga	6	–	2	7	–	5
East Tennessee State	5	–	3	7	–	5
Western Carolina	5	–	3	7	–	5
Samford	4	–	4	4	–	7
Wofford	3	–	5	5	–	7
Furman	3	–	5	4	–	8
The Citadel	1	–	7	3	–	9
VMI	0	–	8	0	–	12
$ – Conference champion; ^ – FCS playoff participant; As of November 22, 2026; Rankings from STATS Poll

2026 Southland Conference football standings
	Conf.			Overall
Team	W		L	W		L
No. 4 Lamar +^	8	–	1	10	–	2
No. 5 Stephen F. Austin +	8	–	1	11	–	1
No. 21 Incarnate Word	7	–	2	8	–	4
UT Rio Grande Valley	4	–	5	6	–	6
Southeastern Louisiana	4	–	5	6	–	6
Houston Christian	4	–	5	5	–	7
McNeese	4	–	5	5	–	7
Nicholls	3	–	6	4	–	8
East Texas A&M	3	–	6	3	–	9
Northwestern State	0	–	9	0	–	12
+ – Conference co-champions; ^ – FCS playoff participant; As of November 22, 2026; Rankings from STATS Poll

2026 Southwestern Athletic Conference football standings
	Conf.			Overall
Team	W		L	W		L
East Division
Alabama A&M x	6	–	2	9	–	3
Jackson State	5	–	3	8	–	3
Alabama State	4	–	4	6	–	5
Florida A&M*	3	–	5	4	–	8
Bethune–Cookman	3	–	5	5	–	7
Mississippi Valley State*	2	–	6	3	–	9
West Division
Prairie View A&M x	6	–	2	7	–	5
Arkansas–Pine Bluff	5	–	3	7	–	4
Southern	4	–	3	6	–	5
Alcorn State	4	–	4	6	–	6
Grambling State	3	–	4	5	–	5
Texas Southern	2	–	6	3	–	8
Championship: Alabama A&M at Prairie View A&M
$ – Conference champion; x – Division champion/co-champions; y – Championship game participant; * – Ineligible for FCS postseason play due to failed academic requirements; As of November 22, 2026; Rankings from STATS Poll

2026 United Athletic Conference standings
	Conf.			Overall
Team	W		L	W		L
No. 1 Tarleton State $^	7	–	0	12	–	0
No. 19 Abilene Christian	5	–	2	6	–	6
No. 14 Austin Peay	4	–	3	8	–	4
North Alabama	4	–	3	7	–	5
Central Arkansas	3	–	4	5	–	7
Eastern Kentucky	3	–	4	4	–	8
West Florida*	2	–	5	5	–	5
West Georgia*	0	–	7	1	–	11
$ – Conference champion; ^ – FCS playoff participant; * – Ineligible for UAC title and FCS postseason play due to transition from NCAA Division II.; As of November 22, 2026; Rankings from STATS Poll

2026 NCAA Division I FCS independents football standings
	Conf.			Overall
Team	W		L	W		L
Merrimack		–		5	–	7
Chicago State		–		3	–	8

== Playoff qualifiers ==
=== Automatic berths for conference champions ===
Locations of the 11 playoff automatic berths participants

Conference	Team	Record	Appearance	Last bid	Result of last appearance
Big Sky Conference	Montana State	11–1	16th	2025	Won National Championship against Illinois State
CAA Football	Monmouth	9–3	4th	2020	Lost to Sam Houston State in the first round
Ivy League	Harvard	8–1	2nd	2025	Lost to Villanova in the first round
Missouri Valley Football Conference	South Dakota State	10–2	16th	2025	Lost to Montana in the second round
Northeast Conference	LIU	5–7	1st	–	–
Ohio Valley Conference	Western Illinois	8–4	12th	2017	Lost to Weber State in the first round
Patriot League	Lehigh	10–2	14th	2025	Lost to Villanova in the second round
Pioneer Football League	Dayton	10–1	2nd	2015	Lost to Western Illinois in the first round
Southern Conference	Mercer	10–2	4th	2025	Lost to South Dakota in the second round
Southland Conference	Lamar	10–2	3rd	2025	Lost to Abilene Christian in the first round
United Athletic Conference	Tarleton State	12–0	3rd	2025	Lost to Villanova in the quarterfinal

=== At-large qualifiers ===
Conference	Team	Record	Appearance	Last bid	Result of last appearance
Big Sky Conference	Northern Arizona	9–3	8th	2024	Lost to Abilene Christian in the first round
Big Sky Conference	Idaho State	7–5	3rd	1983	Lost to Nevada in the first round
Big Sky Conference	Montana	8–4	31st	2025	Lost to Montana State in the semifinals
Big Sky Conference	Weber State	8–4	11th	2022	Lost to Montana State in the second round
Coastal Athletic Association Football Conference	Albany	8–4	4th	2023	Lost to South Dakota State in the semifinals
Missouri Valley Football Conference	Illinois State	8–4	11th	2025	Lost to Montana State in National Championship
Missouri Valley Football Conference	North Dakota	8–4	7th	2025	
Missouri Valley Football Conference	South Dakota	9–3	6th	2025	
Missouri Valley Football Conference	Youngstown State	8–3	15th	2025	
Southern Conference	Tennessee Tech	9–3	3rd	2025	
Southland Conference	Incarnate Word	8–4	5th	2024	
Southland Conference	Stephen F. Austin	11–1	10th	2025	
United Athletic Conference	Austin Peay	8–4	3rd	2023	

== Postseason ==
First Round; November 28; Campus sites USA: ESPN+/ESPNU; Canada: TSN+
16	Monmouth
Harvard
9	North Dakota
Idaho State
13	Illinois State
Austin Peay
12	Lehigh
Albany
15	Montana
Incarnate Word
10	Northern Arizona
LIU
14	Weber State
Western Illinois
11	Tennessee Tech
Dayton

Second Round; December 5 Campus sites USA: ESPN2/ESPN+ Canada: TSN+
1	Montana State
8	Mercer
4	Lamar
5	Stephen F. Austin
2	Tarleton State
7	South Dakota
3	South Dakota State
6	Youngstown State

Quarterfinals; December 11/12; Campus sites USA: ABC/ESPN/ESPN+ Canada: TSN+

Semifinals; December 19; Campus sites USA: ABC/ESPN2; Canada: TSN+

National Championship; January 11; 7:30 p.m. EST; FirstBank Stadium, Nashville, Tennessee; USA: ESPN; Canada: TSN2/TSN+

== Coaching changes ==
=== Preseason and in-season ===
This is restricted to coaching changes that took place on or after May 1, 2026, and will include any changes announced after a team's last regularly scheduled games but before its playoff games. For coaching changes that occurred earlier in 2026, see 2025 NCAA Division I FCS end-of-season coaching changes.

School	Outgoing coach	Date	Reason	Replacement
Gardner–Webb	Kris McCullough	September 2, 2026	Fired	Pete Bennett (interim)
Bethune–Cookman	Raymond Woodie Jr.	November 15, 2026	Fired	Alvin Wyatt (interim)
Northwestern State	Blaine McCorkle	November 15, 2026	Fired	Norman Joseph (interim)

=== End of season ===
This list includes coaching changes announced during the season that did not take effect until the end of the season.

School	Outgoing coach	Date	Reason	Replacement	Previous position
Furman	Clay Hendrix	October 26, 2026	Resigning at end of season	Cody Worley	Army offensive coordinator
Wofford	Shawn Watson	November 10, 2026	Retiring at end of season	Mike Houston	Clemson volunteer defensive assistant
Central Arkansas	Nathan Brown	November 15, 2026	Mutually agreed to part ways at the end of season		
Indiana State	Curt Mallory	November 22, 2026	Fired		

== See also ==
- 2026 NCAA Division I FBS football season
- 2026 NCAA Division II football season
- 2026 NCAA Division III football season
- 2026 NAIA football season
- 2026 U Sports football season
- 2026 junior college football season
