= 2026 Mercer Bears football team =

American college football season

2026 Mercer Bears football

SoCon champion

FCS Playoffs
- Conference: Southern Conference

Ranking
- STATS: No. 9
- FCS Coaches: No. 7
- Record: 10–2 (7–1 SoCon)
- Head coach: Joel Taylor (1st season)
- Offensive coordinator: Austin Davis (1st season)
- Defensive coordinator: Tripp Weaver (1st season)
- Home stadium: Five Star Stadium

2026 Southern Conference football standings
	Conf.			Overall
Team	W		L	W		L
No. 9 Mercer $^	7	–	1	10	–	2
No. 13 Tennessee Tech	6	–	2	9	–	3
Chattanooga	6	–	2	7	–	5
East Tennessee State	5	–	3	7	–	5
Western Carolina	5	–	3	7	–	5
Samford	4	–	4	4	–	7
Wofford	3	–	5	5	–	7
Furman	3	–	5	4	–	8
The Citadel	1	–	7	3	–	9
VMI	0	–	8	0	–	12
$ – Conference champion; ^ – FCS playoff participant; As of November 22, 2026; Rankings from STATS Poll

The 2026 Mercer Bears football team will represent Mercer University as a member of the Southern Conference (SoCon) during the 2026 NCAA Division I FCS football season. The Bears will be led by first-year head coach Joel Taylor and will play their home games at Five Star Stadium in Macon, Georgia.

== Schedule ==
Date	Time	Opponent	Rank	Site	TV	Result	Attendance
August 29	7:00 p.m.	East Texas A&M*	No. 21	Five Star Stadium; Macon, GA (FCS Kickoff)	ESPN	W 23–15	8,378
September 5	6:00 p.m.	Presbyterian*	No. 19	Five Star Stadium; Macon, GA	ESPN+	W 62–3	4,013
September 12	6:00 p.m.	Furman	No. 18	Five Star Stadium; Macon, GA	ESPN+	L 13–20	5,079
September 19	12:00 p.m.	at Georgia Tech*	No. 23	Bobby Dodd Stadium; Atlanta, GA	ACCN	L 11–44	50,852
September 26	8:00 p.m.	at Abilene Christian*	No. 25	Wildcat Stadium; Abilene, TX	ESPN+	W 34–17	10,744
October 3	1:30 p.m.	at VMI	No. 23	Alumni Memorial Field; Lexington, VA	ESPN+	W 54–3	3,031
October 10	3:00 p.m.	Western Carolina	No. 20	Five Star Stadium; Macon, GA	ESPN+	W 17–14	3,139
October 17	7:00 p.m.	at Samford	No. 18	Pete Hanna Stadium; Homewood, AL	ESPN+	W 31–21	5,071
October 31	3:00 p.m.	The Citadel	No. 16	Five Star Stadium; Macon, GA	ESPN+	W 28–19	5,338
November 7	1:00 p.m.	at No. 25 Chattanooga	No. 14	Finley Stadium; Chattanooga, TN	ESPN+	W 14–7 ^{OT}	8,810
November 14	2:30 p.m.	at No. 9 Tennessee Tech	No. 13	Tucker Stadium; Cookeville, TN	ESPN+	W 38–31	4,012
November 21	3:00 p.m.	East Tennessee State	No. 9	Five Star Stadium; Macon, GA	ESPN+	W 28–25 ^{OT}	4,468
*Non-conference game; Rankings from STATS Poll released prior to the game; All times are in Eastern time

== Game summaries ==
=== East Texas A&M ===
East Texas A&M Lions (0–0) at No. 21 Mercer Bears (0–0) – Game summary

Quarter	1	2	3	4	Total
Lions	0	0	7	8	15
No. 21 Bears	10	13	0	0	23

at Five Star Stadium • Macon, GA

- Date: August 29
- Game time: 7:00 p.m.
- Game weather: Cloudy • Temperature: 83 °F (28 °C) • Wind: SE at 5 miles per hour (8.0 km/h)
- Game attendance: 8,378
- Referee: Bruce Austin
- TV announcers (ESPN): Clay Matvick (play-by-play), Rocky Boiman (analyst) and Laura Stickells (sideline)

Game information

First quarter

- MER – Simon Zeidan 55-yard field goal, 6:45. Bears 3–0. Drive: 11 plays, 43 yards, 5:42.
- MER – Jackson Kostmayer 12-yard pass from Jaylen King (Simon Zeidan kick), 3:04. Bears 10–0. Drive: 4 plays, 76 yards, 1:10.

Second quarter

- MER – Simon Zeidan 21-yard field goal, 5:20. Bears 13–0. Drive: 7 plays, 65 yards, 3:11.
- MER – Simon Zeidan 33-yard field goal, 0:30. Bears 16–0. Drive: 12 plays, 62 yards, 3:50.
- MER – Cameron Goggins 38-yard interception return (Simon Zeidan kick), 0:15. Bears 23–0.

Third quarter

- ETAM – Micah Simpson 48-yard pass from Eric Rodriguez (Ozlo Rigby kick), 6:47. Bears 23–7. Drive: 4 plays, 56 yards, 2:01.

Fourth quarter

- ETAM – Quay Middlebrooks 1-yard run (Eric Rodriguez run), 11:10. Bears 23–15. Drive: 13 plays, 80 yards, 6:56.

Statistics	ETAM	MER
First downs	15	16
Total yards	70–383	64–352
Rushing yards	39–151	36–175
Passing yards	232	177
Passing: Comp–Att–Int	15–31–3	15–28–0
Turnovers	3	0
Time of possession	30:14	29:46

Team	Category	Player	Statistics
East Texas A&M	Passing	Eric Rodriguez	15/31, 232 yards, TD, 3 INT
East Texas A&M	Rushing	EJ Oakmon	14 carries, 87 yards
East Texas A&M	Receiving	Micah Simpson	9 receptions, 165 yards, TD
Mercer	Passing	Jaylen King	15/28, 177 yards, TD
Mercer	Rushing	Zahmari Palode-Gary	8 carries, 87 yards
Mercer	Receiving	Brayden Smith	9 receptions, 131 yards

=== Presbyterian ===
Presbyterian Blue Hose (1–0) at No. 19 Mercer Bears (1–0) – Game summary

Quarter	1	2	3	4	Total
Blue Hose	0	3	0	0	3
No. 19 Bears	20	21	7	14	62

at Five Star Stadium • Macon, GA

- Date: September 5
- Game time: 6:00 p.m.
- Game weather: Cloudy • Temperature: 94 °F (34 °C) • Wind: N at 2 miles per hour (3.2 km/h)
- Game attendance: 4,013
- Referee: Jake Grombach
- TV announcers (ESPN+): Frank Malloy (play-by-play) and Phil Cox (analyst)

Game information

First quarter

- MER – Jaylen King 16-yard run (Simon Zeidan kick), 12:00. Bears 7–0. Drive: 5 plays, 50 yards, 2:01.
- MER – Brayden Smith 51-yard pass from Jaylen King (pass failed), 9:50. Bears 13–0. Drive: 3 plays, 57 yards, 1:04.
- MER – Eric Rasheed 32-yard pass from Jaylen King (Simon Zeidan kick), 6:13. Bears 20–0. Drive: 5 plays, 86 yards, 1:47.

Second quarter

- MER – Samuel Albee 6-yard pass from Jaylen King (Simon Zeidan kick), 6:07. Bears 27–0. Drive: 10 plays, 80 yards, 4:48.
- MER – Jaylen King 12-yard run (Simon Zeidan kick), 2:10. Bears 34–0. Drive: 2 plays, 14 yards, 0:29.
- PRES – Kade Bailey 38-yard field goal, 0:43. Bears 34–3. Drive: 9 plays, 54 yards, 1:27.
- MER – Travion Solomon 14-yard pass from Jaylen King (Simon Zeidan kick), 0:01. Bears 41–3. Drive: 4 plays, 56 yards, 0:33.

Third quarter

- MER – JP Pickles 26-yard run (Simon Zeidan kick), 0:54. Bears 48–3. Drive: 6 plays, 80 yards, 2:40.

Fourth quarter

- MER – Kel Calixte 12-yard pass from JP Pickles (Simon Zeidan kick), 11:09. Bears 55–3. Drive: 3 plays, 15 yards, 0:39.
- MER – Devon Caldwell 83-yard run (Sully Croker kick), 7:38. Bears 62–3. Drive: 1 play, 83 yards, 0:16.

Statistics	PRES	MER
First downs	19	24
Total yards	74–321	53–600
Rushing yards	39–105	33–329
Passing yards	216	271
Passing: Comp–Att–Int	21–35–0	15–20–0
Turnovers	1	0
Time of possession	31:51	23:43

Team	Category	Player	Statistics
Presbyterian	Passing	Landon Sharpe	17/29, 184 yards
Presbyterian	Rushing	Landon Sharpe	13 carries, 55 yards
Presbyterian	Receiving	Brice Johnson	7 receptions, 83 yards
Mercer	Passing	Jaylen King	12/15, 236 yards, 4 TD
Mercer	Rushing	Devon Caldwell	11 carries, 152 yards, TD
Mercer	Receiving	Brayden Smith	5 receptions, 132 yards, TD

=== Furman ===
Furman Paladins (1–1) at No. 18 Mercer Bears (2–0) – Game summary

Quarter	1	2	3	4	Total
Paladins	3	0	7	10	20
No. 18 Bears	3	0	3	7	13

at Five Star Stadium • Macon, GA

- Date: September 12
- Game time: 6:00 p.m.
- Game attendance: 5,079
- TV announcers (ESPN+): Frank Malloy (play-by-play) and Phil Cox (analyst)

Game information

First quarter

- FUR - Nathan Chapman 44-yard field goal, 6:27. Paladins 3–0. Drive: 10 plays, 50 yards, 3:27.
- MER - Simon Zeidan 54-yard field goal, 2:41. Tied 3–3. Drive: 7 plays, 33 yards, 3:40.

Second quarter

- No scoring plays.

Third quarter

- MER - Simon Zeidan 47-yard field goal, 8:14. Bears 6–3. Drive: 7 plays, -8 yards, 1:24.
- FUR - Daniel Haughton 46-yard pass from Jake Garcia (Nathan Chapman kick), 1:09. Paladins 10–6. Drive: 1 play, 46 yards, 0:09.

Fourth quarter

- MER - JP Pickles 1-yard run (Simon Zeidan kick), 13:20. Bears 13–10. Drive: 9 plays, 74 yards, 2:45.
- FUR - Nathan Chapman 43-yard field goal, 4:53. Tied 13–13. Drive: 4 plays, 8 yards, 2:06.
- FUR - Ben Croasdale 47-yard run (Nathan Chapman kick), 0:47. Paladins 20–13. Drive: 6 plays, 38 yards, 1:07.

Statistics	FUR	MER
First downs	14	15
Total yards	315	361
Rushing yards	157	164
Passing yards	158	197
Passing: Comp–Att–Int	18–28–2	19–36–4
Time of possession	28:56	31:04

Team	Category	Player	Statistics
Furman	Passing	Jake Garcia	18/28, 158 yards, TD, 2 INT
Furman	Rushing	Ben Croasdale	6 carries, 74 yards, TD
Furman	Receiving	Daniel Haughton	8 receptions, 103 yards, TD
Mercer	Passing	Jaylen King	18/35, 196 yards, 4 INT
Mercer	Rushing	Zahmari Palode-Gary	13 carries, 87 yards
Mercer	Receiving	Travion Solomon	6 receptions, 120 yards

=== at Georgia Tech (FBS) ===
No. 23 Mercer Bears (2–1) at Georgia Tech Yellow Jackets (0–2) – Game summary

Quarter	1	2	3	4	Total
No. 23 Bears	0	3	8	0	11
Yellow Jackets	7	17	13	7	44

at Bobby Dodd Stadium • Atlanta, GA

- Date: September 19
- Game time: 12:00 p.m.
- TV announcers (ACCN): Jorge Sedano, Rodney McLeod and Kendra Douglas

Statistics	MER	GT
First downs	15	20
Plays–yards	60–290	62–405
Rushes–yards	46–188	40–156
Passing yards	102	249
Passing: comp–att–int	10–14–1	15–22–0
Time of possession	32:42	27:18

Team	Category	Player	Statistics
Mercer	Passing	JP Pickles	7/11, 82 yards, INT
Mercer	Rushing	Zahmari Palode-Gary	15 carries, 71 yards
Mercer	Receiving	Brayden Smith	4 receptions, 58 yards
Georgia Tech	Passing	Alberto Mendoza	15/21, 249 yards, 3 TD
Georgia Tech	Rushing	Justice Haynes	22 carries, 141 yards, 2 TD
Georgia Tech	Receiving	Dalen Penson	3 receptions, 58 yards

=== at Abilene Christian ===
No. 25 Mercer Bears (2–2) at Abilene Christian Wildcats (1–3) – Game summary

Quarter	1	2	3	4	Total
No. 25 Bears	0	0	0	0	0
Wildcats	0	0	0	0	0

at Wildcat Stadium • Abilene, TX

- Date: September 26
- Game time: 8:00 p.m.
- TV: ESPN+

Statistics	MER	ACU
First downs		
Total yards		
Rushing yards		
Passing yards		
Passing: Comp–Att–Int		
Time of possession		

Team	Category	Player	Statistics
Mercer	Passing		
Mercer	Rushing		
Mercer	Receiving		
Abilene Christian	Passing		
Abilene Christian	Rushing		
Abilene Christian	Receiving		

=== at VMI ===
No. 23 Mercer Bears (3–2) at VMI Keydets (0–5) – Game summary

Quarter	1	2	3	4	Total
No. 23 Bears	0	0	0	0	0
Keydets	0	0	0	0	0

at Alumni Memorial Field • Lexington, VA

- Date: October 3
- Game time: 1:30 p.m.
- TV: ESPN+

Statistics	MER	VMI
First downs		
Total yards		
Rushing yards		
Passing yards		
Passing: Comp–Att–Int		
Time of possession		

Team	Category	Player	Statistics
Mercer	Passing		
Mercer	Rushing		
Mercer	Receiving		
VMI	Passing		
VMI	Rushing		
VMI	Receiving		

=== Western Carolina ===
Western Carolina Catamounts (3–3) at No. 20 Mercer Bears (4–2) – Game summary

Quarter	1	2	3	4	Total
Catamounts	0	0	0	0	0
No. 20 Bears	0	0	0	0	0

at Five Star Stadium • Macon, GA

- Date: October 10
- Game time: 3:00 p.m.
- TV: ESPN+

Statistics	WCU	MER
First downs		
Total yards		
Rushing yards		
Passing yards		
Passing: Comp–Att–Int		
Time of possession		

Team	Category	Player	Statistics
Western Carolina	Passing		
Western Carolina	Rushing		
Western Carolina	Receiving		
Mercer	Passing		
Mercer	Rushing		
Mercer	Receiving		

=== at Samford ===
No. 18 Mercer Bears (5–2) at Samford Bulldogs (1–5) – Game summary

Quarter	1	2	3	4	Total
No. 18 Bears	0	0	0	0	0
Bulldogs	0	0	0	0	0

at Pete Hanna Stadium • Homewood, AL

- Date: October 17
- Game time: 7:00 p.m.
- TV: ESPN+

Statistics	MER	SAM
First downs		
Total yards		
Rushing yards		
Passing yards		
Passing: Comp–Att–Int		
Time of possession		

Team	Category	Player	Statistics
Mercer	Passing		
Mercer	Rushing		
Mercer	Receiving		
Samford	Passing		
Samford	Rushing		
Samford	Receiving		

=== The Citadel ===
The Citadel Bulldogs (2–6) at No. 16 Mercer Bears (6–2) – Game summary

Quarter	1	2	3	4	Total
Bulldogs	0	0	0	0	0
No. 16 Bears	0	0	0	0	0

at Five Star Stadium • Macon, GA

- Date: October 31
- Game time: 3:00 p.m.
- TV: ESPN+

Statistics	CIT	MER
First downs		
Total yards		
Rushing yards		
Passing yards		
Passing: Comp–Att–Int		
Time of possession		

Team	Category	Player	Statistics
The Citadel	Passing		
The Citadel	Rushing		
The Citadel	Receiving		
Mercer	Passing		
Mercer	Rushing		
Mercer	Receiving		

=== at No. 25 Chattanooga ===
No. 14 Mercer Bears (7–2) at No. 25 Chattanooga Mocs (6–3) – Game summary

Quarter	1	2	3	4	Total
No. 14 Bears	0	0	0	0	0
No. 25 Mocs	0	0	0	0	0

at Finley Stadium • Chattanooga, TN

- Date: November 7
- Game time: 1:00 p.m.
- TV: ESPN+

Statistics	MER	UTC
First downs		
Total yards		
Rushing yards		
Passing yards		
Passing: Comp–Att–Int		
Time of possession		

Team	Category	Player	Statistics
Mercer	Passing		
Mercer	Rushing		
Mercer	Receiving		
Chattanooga	Passing		
Chattanooga	Rushing		
Chattanooga	Receiving		

=== at No. 9 Tennessee Tech ===
No. 13 Mercer Bears (8–2) at No. 9 Tennessee Tech Golden Eagles (9–1) – Game summary

Quarter	1	2	3	4	Total
No. 13 Bears	0	0	0	0	0
No. 9 Golden Eagles	0	0	0	0	0

at Tucker Stadium • Cookeville, TN

- Date: November 14
- Game time: 2:30 p.m.
- TV: ESPN+

Statistics	MER	TNTC
First downs		
Total yards		
Rushing yards		
Passing yards		
Passing: Comp–Att–Int		
Time of possession		

Team	Category	Player	Statistics
Mercer	Passing		
Mercer	Rushing		
Mercer	Receiving		
Tennessee Tech	Passing		
Tennessee Tech	Rushing		
Tennessee Tech	Receiving		

=== East Tennessee State ===
East Tennessee State Buccaneers (7–4) at No. 9 Mercer Bears (9–2) – Game summary

Quarter	1	2	3	4	Total
Buccaneers	0	0	0	0	0
No. 9 Bears	0	0	0	0	0

at Five Star Stadium • Macon, GA

- Date: November 21
- Game time: 3:00 p.m.
- TV: ESPN+

Statistics	ETSU	MER
First downs		
Total yards		
Rushing yards		
Passing yards		
Passing: Comp–Att–Int		
Time of possession		

Team	Category	Player	Statistics
East Tennessee State	Passing		
East Tennessee State	Rushing		
East Tennessee State	Receiving		
Mercer	Passing		
Mercer	Rushing		
Mercer	Receiving		

== Rankings ==
Ranking movements Legend: ██ Increase in ranking ██ Decrease in ranking т = Tied with team above or below
	Week														
Poll	Pre	1	2	3	4	5	6	7	8	9	10	11	12	13	Final
STATS	21	19	18	23	25	23	20	18	17	16	14	13	9		
Coaches	17	15	14	22	23т	21	18	16	13	12	11	11	7		
