= 2026 VMI Keydets football team =

American college football season

2026 VMI Keydets football
- Conference: Southern Conference
- Record: 0–12 (0–8 SoCon)
- Head coach: Ashley Ingram (1st season)
- Offensive coordinator: Brent Thompson (1st season)
- Defensive coordinator: Jared Backus (1st season)
- Home stadium: Alumni Memorial Field

2026 Southern Conference football standings
	Conf.			Overall
Team	W		L	W		L
No. 9 Mercer $^	7	–	1	10	–	2
No. 13 Tennessee Tech	6	–	2	9	–	3
Chattanooga	6	–	2	7	–	5
East Tennessee State	5	–	3	7	–	5
Western Carolina	5	–	3	7	–	5
Samford	4	–	4	4	–	7
Wofford	3	–	5	5	–	7
Furman	3	–	5	4	–	8
The Citadel	1	–	7	3	–	9
VMI	0	–	8	0	–	12
$ – Conference champion; ^ – FCS playoff participant; Rankings from STATS Polldate=November 22, 2026

The 2026 VMI Keydets football team represented the Virginia Military Institute as a member of the Southern Conference (SoCon) during the 2026 NCAA Division I FCS football season. The Keydets were led by first-year head coach Ashley Ingram and played their home games at Alumni Memorial Field in Lexington, Virginia.

== Schedule ==
Date	Time	Opponent	Site	TV	Result	Attendance
August 29	6:00 p.m.	at Idaho State*	ICCU Dome; Pocatello, ID	ESPN+	L 10–38	5,526
September 5	7:30 p.m.	at Virginia Tech*	Lane Stadium; Blacksburg, VA (rivalry)	ACCN	L 3–73	65,632
September 12	12:30 p.m.	Bucknell*	Alumni Memorial Field; Lexington, VA	ESPN+	L 3–14	5,235
September 19	1:00 p.m.	at Davidson*	Davidson College Stadium; Davidson, NC	ESPN+	L 24–27 ^{OT}	1,952
September 26	3:30 p.m.	at Samford	Pete Hanna Stadium; Homewood, AL	ESPN+	L 7–45	10,033
October 3	1:30 p.m.	No. 23 Mercer	Alumni Memorial Field; Lexington, VA	ESPN+	L 3–54	3,031
October 17	1:30 p.m.	at Wofford	Gibbs Stadium; Spartanburg, SC	ESPN+	L 14–41	6,102
October 24	1:30 p.m.	No. 18 East Tennessee State	Alumni Memorial Field; Lexington, VA	ESPN+	L 0–38	5,296
October 31	1:00 p.m.	at Chattanooga	Finley Stadium; Chattanooga, TN	ESPN+	L 10–24	5,554
November 7	2:30 p.m.	at No. 9 Tennessee Tech	Tucker Stadium; Cookeville, TN	ESPN+	L 14–66	5,922
November 14	12:30 p.m.	The Citadel	Alumni Memorial Field; Lexington, VA (Military Classic of the South)	ESPN+	L 21–24	5,894
November 21	12:00 p.m.	Furman	Alumni Memorial Field; Lexington, VA	ESPN+	L 3–35	4,370
*Non-conference game; Rankings from STATS Poll released prior to the game; All times are in Eastern time

== Game summaries ==
=== at Idaho State ===
VMI Keydets (0–0) at Idaho State Bengals (0–0) – Game summary

Quarter	1	2	3	4	Total
Keydets	0	0	0	10	10
Bengals	3	7	28	0	38

at ICCU Dome • Pocatello, Idaho

- Date: August 29
- Game time: 6:00 p.m.
- Game weather: none (played indoors)
- Game attendance: 5,526
- Referee: Jim Crowley
- TV announcers (ESPN+): Scott Gross and Mitch Beckstead

Game information

First quarter

- IDST – Mason Lindberg 38-yard field goal, 11:09. Bengals 3–0. Drive: 5 plays, 11 yards, 1:27.

Second quarter

- IDST – Julian Mason 9-yard pass from Jordan Cooke (Mason Lindberg kick), 0:27. Bengals 10–0. Drive: 4 plays, 51 yards, 0:56.

Third quarter

- IDST – Chedon James 49-yard pass from Jordan Cooke (Mason Lindberg kick), 13:22. Bengals 17–0. Drive: 6 plays, 75 yards, 1:38.
- IDST – Noa Calaycay 6-yard blocked punt return (Mason Lindberg kick), 11:06. Bengals 24–0.
- IDST – Zedekiah Anahu-Ambrosio 83-yard pass from Jordan Cooke (Mason Lindberg kick), 6:34. Bengals 31–0. Drive: 2 plays, 90 yards, 0:44.
- IDST – Eli Aragon 38-yard pass from Jordan Cooke (Mason Lindberg kick), 5:17. Bengals 38–0. Drive: 1 play, 38 yards, 0:07.

Fourth quarter

- VMI – Chander Wilson 31-yard run (Jack Joyce kick), 7:11. Bengals 38–7. Drive: 2 plays, 78 yards, 0:54.
- VMI – Jack Joyce 23-yard field goal, 1:57. Bengals 38–10. Drive: 5 plays, 28 yards, 2:04.

Statistics	VMI	IDST
First downs	10	18
Plays–yards	61–240	64–454
Rushes–yards	52–229	25–88
Passing yards	11	366
Passing: comp–att–int	5–9–0	23–39–2
Turnovers	1	2
Time of possession	34:59	25:01

Team	Category	Player	Statistics
VMI	Passing	JoJo Crump	3/7, 16 yards
VMI	Rushing	Chandler Wilson	7 carries, 62 yards, TD
VMI	Receiving	Cade Cox	1 reception, 6 yards
Idaho State	Passing	Jordan Cooke	18/29, 325 yards, 4 TD, INT
Idaho State	Rushing	Dason Brooks	5 carries, 24 yards
Idaho State	Receiving	Eli Aragon	7 receptions, 97 yards, TD

=== at Virginia Tech (FBS, rivalry) ===
VMI Keydets (0–1) at Virginia Tech Hokies (FBS) (0–0) – Game summary

Quarter	1	2	3	4	Total
Keydets	0	0	0	3	3
Hokies (FBS)	21	24	21	7	73

at Lane Stadium • Blacksburg, Virginia

- Date: September 5
- Game time: 7:30 p.m.
- Game weather: Sunny • Temperature: 80 °F (27 °C) • Wind: NW 3 mph
- Game attendance: 65,632
- Referee: Darryl DeBerry
- TV announcers (ACCN): Wes Durham, Max Browne and Madison Fitzpatrick

Game information

First quarter

- (11:41) VT – Jeffrey Overton Jr. 50-yard run, John Love kick (Drive: 7 plays, 75 yards, 3:19; Hokies 7–0)
- (9:30) VT – Marcellous Hawkins Jr. 9-yard run, John Love kick (Drive: 1 plays, 9 yards, 0:05; Hokies 14–0)
- (4:56) VT – Jeffrey Overton Jr. 23-yard run, John Love kick (Drive: 7 plays, 56 yards, 2:30; Hokies 21–0)

Second quarter

- (14:37) VT – Marcellous Hawkins Jr. 1-yard run, John Love kick (Drive: 6 plays, 72 yards, 1:34; Hokies 28–0)
- (9:58) VT – John Love 32-yard field goal (Drive: 6 plays, 33 yards, 2:18; Hokies 31–0)
- (5:13) VT – Que'Sean Brown 51-yard pass from Ethan Grunkemeyer, John Love kick (Drive: 5 plays, 65 yards, 2:38; Hokies 38–0)
- (2:48) VT – Knahlij Harrell 0-yard punt return, John Love kick (Hokies 45–0)

Third quarter

- (12:33) VT – Luke Reynolds 21-yard pass from Ethan Grunkemeyer, John Love kick (Drive: 2 plays, 24 yards, 0:29; Hokies 52–0)
- (6:52) VT – Marcellous Hawkins Jr. 2-yard run, John Love kick (Drive: 9 plays, 55 yards, 4:18; Hokies 59–0)
- (0:33) VT – Chanz Wiggins 40-yard pass from Bryce Baker, John Love kick (Drive: 1 plays, 35 yards, 0:18; Hokies 66–0)

Fourth quarter

- (10:38) VT – A.J. Brand 1-yard run, John Love kick (Drive: 7 plays, 65 yards, 2:46; Hokies 73–0)
- (7:45) VMI – Jack Joyce 50-yard field goal (Drive: 4 plays, 3 yards, 0:53; Hokies 73–3)

Statistics	VMI	VT
First downs	6	30
Plays–yards	56–83	72–619
Rushes–yards	43–(-4)	40–268
Passing yards	87	351
Passing: comp–att–int	5–13–1	27–32–0
Turnovers	1	2
Time of possession	31:27	28:33

Team	Category	Player	Statistics
VMI	Passing	JoJo Crump	4/8, 54 yards, INT
VMI	Rushing	Traveion Slaughter	3 carries, 21 yards
VMI	Receiving	Halim Hardnett	1 reception, 33 yards
Virginia Tech	Passing	Ethan Grunkemeyer	17/20, 224 yards, 2 TD
Virginia Tech	Rushing	Jeffrey Overton Jr.	9 carries, 104 yards, 2 TD
Virginia Tech	Receiving	Que'Sean Brown	6 receptions, 109 yards, TD

=== Bucknell ===
Bucknell Bison (0–2) at VMI Keydets (0–2) – Game summary

Quarter	1	2	3	4	Total
Bison	0	0	0	14	14
Keydets	0	3	0	0	3

at Alumni Memorial Field • Lexington, Virginia

- Date: September 12
- Game time: 12:30 p.m.
- Game weather: Sunny
- Game attendance: 5,235
- Referee: Brian Hilpisch
- TV: ESPN+

Game information

First quarter

No scoring plays

Second quarter

- (1:51) VMI – Jack Joyce 26-yard field goal (Drive: 13 plays, 72 yards, 5:55; Keydets 3–0)

Third quarter

No scoring plays

Fourth quarter

- (6:51) BUCK – Jackson Nowinski 27-yard pass from Chris Dietrich, Juan Garanton kick (Drive: 6 plays, 66 yards, 2:37; Bison 7–3)
- (2:19) BUCK – Michael Cadden 8-yard run, Juan Garanton kick (Drive: 5 plays, 46 yards, 2:03; Bison 14–3)

Statistics	BUCK	VMI
First downs	17	14
Plays–yards	58–342	63–259
Rushes–yards	28–121	36–104
Passing yards	221	155
Passing: comp–att–int	22–30–0	11–27–1
Turnovers	0	1
Time of possession	28:25	31:35

Team	Category	Player	Statistics
Bucknell	Passing	Chris Dietrich	22/30, 221 yards, TD
Bucknell	Rushing	Michael Cadden	14 carries, 70 yards, TD
Bucknell	Receiving	Kaleb Lampkins	1 reception, 46 yards
VMI	Passing	Ian Reynolds	11/27, 155 yards, INT
VMI	Rushing	Ian Reynolds	7 carries, 26 yards
VMI	Receiving	Cade Cox	3 receptions, 49 yards

=== at Davidson ===
VMI Keydets (0–3) at Davidson Wildcats (1–2) – Game summary

Quarter	1	2	3	4	Total
Keydets	0	0	0	0	0
Wildcats	0	0	0	0	0

at Davidson College Stadium • Davidson, North Carolina

- Date: September 19
- Game time: 1:00 p.m.

Game information

First quarter
Second quarter
Third quarter
Fourth quarter

Statistics	VMI	DAV
First downs		
Plays–yards		
Rushes–yards		
Passing yards		
Passing: comp–att–int		
Turnovers		
Time of possession		

Team	Category	Player	Statistics
VMI	Passing		
VMI	Rushing		
VMI	Receiving		
Davidson	Passing		
Davidson	Rushing		
Davidson	Receiving		

=== at Samford ===
VMI Keydets (0–4) at Samford Bulldogs (0–3) – Game summary

Quarter	1	2	3	4	Total
Keydets	0	0	0	0	0
Bulldogs	0	0	0	0	0

at Pete Hanna Stadium • Homewood, Alabama

- Date: September 26
- Game time: 3:30 p.m.
- Game attendance: 10,033
- TV: ESPN+

Game information

First quarter
Second quarter
Third quarter
Fourth quarter

Statistics	VMI	SAM
First downs		
Plays–yards		
Rushes–yards		
Passing yards		
Passing: comp–att–int		
Turnovers		
Time of possession		

Team	Category	Player	Statistics
VMI	Passing		
VMI	Rushing		
VMI	Receiving		
Samford	Passing		
Samford	Rushing		
Samford	Receiving		

=== No. 23 Mercer ===
No. 23 Mercer Bears (3–2) at VMI Keydets (0–5) – Game summary

Quarter	1	2	3	4	Total
No. 23 Bears	0	0	0	0	0
Keydets	0	0	0	0	0

at Alumni Memorial Field • Lexington, Virginia

- Date: October 3
- Game time: 1:30 p.m.
- TV: ESPN+

Game information

First quarter
Second quarter
Third quarter
Fourth quarter

Statistics	MER	VMI
First downs		
Plays–yards		
Rushes–yards		
Passing yards		
Passing: comp–att–int		
Turnovers		
Time of possession		

Team	Category	Player	Statistics
Mercer	Passing		
Mercer	Rushing		
Mercer	Receiving		
VMI	Passing		
VMI	Rushing		
VMI	Receiving		

=== at Wofford ===
VMI Keydets (0–6) at Wofford Terriers (4–3) – Game summary

Quarter	1	2	3	4	Total
Keydets	0	0	0	0	0
Terriers	0	0	0	0	0

at Gibbs Stadium • Spartanburg, South Carolina

- Date: October 17
- Game time: 1:30 p.m.

Game information

First quarter
Second quarter
Third quarter
Fourth quarter

Statistics	VMI	WOF
First downs		
Plays–yards		
Rushes–yards		
Passing yards		
Passing: comp–att–int		
Turnovers		
Time of possession		

Team	Category	Player	Statistics
VMI	Passing		
VMI	Rushing		
VMI	Receiving		
Wofford	Passing		
Wofford	Rushing		
Wofford	Receiving		

=== No. 18 East Tennessee State ===
No. 18 East Tennessee State Buccaneers (5–2) at VMI Keydets (0–7) – Game summary

Quarter	1	2	3	4	Total
No. 18 Buccaneers	7	10	7	14	38
Keydets	0	0	0	0	0

at Alumni Memorial Field • Lexington, Virginia

- Date: October 24
- Game time: 1:30 p.m.
- Game weather: Sunny
- Game attendance: 5,296
- Referee: Todd Boyd
- TV announcers (ESPN+): Wade Branner (play-by-play), Chip Tarkenton (analyst) and Phil Marcello (sideline)

Game information

First quarter

- (1:19) ETSU – Khristian Means 19-yard pass from Mason Mims, Ewan Johnson kick (Drive: 8 plays, 59 yards, 3:12; East Tennessee State 7–0)

Second quarter

- (6:49) ETSU – Ewan Johnson 37-yard field goal (Drive: 10 plays, 60 yards, 4:46; East Tennessee State 10–0)
- (2:29) ETSU – Tyler Griffin 23-yard pass from Mason Mims, Ewan Johnson kick (Drive: 5 plays, 35 yards, 2:35; East Tennessee State 17–0)

Third quarter

- (7:09) ETSU – Jason Albritton 7-yard run, Ewan Johnson kick (Drive: 8 plays, 66 yards, 3:20; East Tennessee State 24–0)

Fourth quarter

- (12:43) ETSU – Tyler Griffin 13-yard pass from Suderian Harrison, Ewan Johnson kick (Drive: 14 plays, 86 yards, 7:38; East Tennessee State 31–0)
- (6:10) ETSU – TJ Peyton 28-yard run, Ethan Lane kick (Drive: 11 plays, 78 yards, 4:34; East Tennessee State 38–0)

Statistics	ETSU	VMI
First downs	32	6
Plays–yards	78–482	42–143
Rushes–yards	45–272	37–130
Passing yards	210	13
Passing: comp–att–int	26–33–0	2–5–0
Turnovers	0	0
Time of possession	34:32	25:28

Team	Category	Player	Statistics
East Tennessee State	Passing	Mason Mims	22/25, 173 yards, 2 TD
East Tennessee State	Rushing	TJ Peyton	15 carries, 121 yards, TD
East Tennessee State	Receiving	Tyler Griffin	7 receptions, 56 yards, 2 TD
VMI	Passing	Ian Reynolds	2/5, 13 yards
VMI	Rushing	JoJo Crump	5 carries, 54 yards
VMI	Receiving	Traveion Slaughter	1 reception, 12 yards

=== at Chattanooga ===
VMI Keydets (0–8) at Chattanooga Mocs (5–3) – Game summary

Quarter	1	2	3	4	Total
Keydets	0	0	0	0	0
Mocs	0	0	0	0	0

at Finley Stadium • Chattanooga, Tennessee

- Date: October 31
- Game time: 1:00 p.m.

Game information

First quarter
Second quarter
Third quarter
Fourth quarter

Statistics	VMI	UTC
First downs		
Plays–yards		
Rushes–yards		
Passing yards		
Passing: comp–att–int		
Turnovers		
Time of possession		

Team	Category	Player	Statistics
VMI	Passing		
VMI	Rushing		
VMI	Receiving		
Chattanooga	Passing		
Chattanooga	Rushing		
Chattanooga	Receiving		

=== at No. 9 Tennessee Tech ===
VMI Keydets (0–9) at No. 9 Tennessee Tech Golden Eagles (8–1) – Game summary

Quarter	1	2	3	4	Total
Keydets	0	7	7	0	14
No. 9 Golden Eagles	7	35	7	17	66

at Tucker Stadium • Cookeville, Tennessee

- Date: November 7
- Game time: 2:30 p.m.

Game information

First quarter

- TNTC - Eric Weatherley 29-yard pass from Jax Leatherwood (Carter Brown kick), 10:49. Golden Eagles 7–0. Drive: 6 plays, 61 yards, 3:14.

Second quarter

- TNTC - Eric Weatherley 29-yard pass from Jax Leatherwood (Carter Brown kick), 9:51. Golden Eagles 14–0. Drive: 11 plays, 66 yards, 5:24.
- VMI - Leo Boehling 37-yard run (Jack Joyce kick), 6:59. Golden Eagles 14–7. Drive: 5 plays, 75 yards, 2:52.
- TNTC - M. J. Flowers 8-yard run (Carter Brown kick), 6:40. Golden Eagles 21–7. Drive: 1 play, 8 yards, 0:07.
- TNTC - Lazaro Rodriguez 21-yard pass from Jax Leatherwood (Carter Brown kick), 5:18. Golden Eagles 28–7. Drive: 1 play, 21 yards, 0:04.
- TNTC - Gabe Nunez 34-yard pass from Jax Leatherwood (Carter Brown kick), 2:44. Golden Eagles 35–7. Drive: 2 plays, 35 yards, 0:44.
- TNTC - Maury Sullivan 24-yard pass from Jax Leatherwood (Carter Brown kick), 0:44. Golden Eagles 42–7. Drive: 7 plays, 60 yards, 1:01.

Third quarter

- TNTC - Qua Ashley 6-yard run (Carter Brown kick), 9:13. Golden Eagles 49–7. Drive: 9 plays, 48 yards, 5:39.
- VMI - Cade Cox 17-yard pass from JoJo Crump (Jack Joyce kick), 2:25. Golden Eagles 49–14. Drive: 5 plays, 32 yards, 2:40.

Fourth quarter

- TNTC - Carter Brown 25-yard field goal, 12:43. Golden Eagles 52–14. Drive: 9 plays, 57 yards, 4:38.
- TNTC - Aidan Littles 43-yard run (Carter Brown kick), 9:46. Golden Eagles 59–14. Drive: 3 plays, 54 yards, 1:23.
- TNTC - Ahmad Haston 7-yard run (Carter Brown kick), 5:50. Golden Eagles 66–14. Drive: 6 plays, 48 yards, 3:41.

Statistics	VMI	TNTC
First downs	8	26
Plays–yards	50–173	67–522
Rushes–yards	39–109	37–194
Passing yards	64	328
Passing: comp–att–int	4–11–2	23–30–0
Turnovers	3	0
Time of possession	27:01	32:59

Team	Category	Player	Statistics
VMI	Passing	JoJo Crump	4/7, 64 yards, TD, 2 INT
VMI	Rushing	Leo Boehling	16 carries, 81 yards, TD
VMI	Receiving	Cole Varner	1 reception, 41 yards
Tennessee Tech	Passing	Jax Leatherwood	21/28, 312 yards, 5 TD
Tennessee Tech	Rushing	M. J. Flowers	17 carries, 69 yards, TD
Tennessee Tech	Receiving	Eric Weatherley	7 receptions, 112 yards, 2 TD

=== The Citadel (Military Classic of the South) ===
The Citadel Bulldogs (2–8) at VMI Keydets (0–10) – Game summary

Quarter	1	2	3	4	Total
Bulldogs	0	0	0	0	0
Keydets	0	0	0	0	0

at Alumni Memorial Field • Lexington, Virginia

- Date: November 14

Game information

First quarter
Second quarter
Third quarter
Fourth quarter

Statistics	CIT	VMI
First downs		
Plays–yards		
Rushes–yards		
Passing yards		
Passing: comp–att–int		
Turnovers		
Time of possession		

Team	Category	Player	Statistics
The Citadel	Passing		
The Citadel	Rushing		
The Citadel	Receiving		
VMI	Passing		
VMI	Rushing		
VMI	Receiving		

=== Furman ===
Furman Paladins (3–8) at VMI Keydets (0–11) – Game summary

Quarter	1	2	3	4	Total
Paladins	0	0	0	0	0
Keydets	0	0	0	0	0

at Alumni Memorial Field • Lexington, Virginia

- Date: November 21

Game information

First quarter
Second quarter
Third quarter
Fourth quarter

Statistics	FUR	VMI
First downs		
Plays–yards		
Rushes–yards		
Passing yards		
Passing: comp–att–int		
Turnovers		
Time of possession		

Team	Category	Player	Statistics
Furman	Passing		
Furman	Rushing		
Furman	Receiving		
VMI	Passing		
VMI	Rushing		
VMI	Receiving		
