= 2026 Wofford Terriers football team =

American college football season

2026 Wofford Terriers football
- Conference: Southern Conference
- Record: 5–7 (3–5 SoCon)
- Head coach: Shawn Watson (4th season)
- Co-offensive coordinators: Lane Knost (1st season); Corey Woods (1st (5th overall) season)
- Defensive coordinator: Mitch Doolittle (2nd season)
- Home stadium: Gibbs Stadium

2026 Southern Conference football standings
	Conf.			Overall
Team	W		L	W		L
No. 9 Mercer $^	7	–	1	10	–	2
No. 13 Tennessee Tech	6	–	2	9	–	3
Chattanooga	6	–	2	7	–	5
East Tennessee State	5	–	3	7	–	5
Western Carolina	5	–	3	7	–	5
Samford	4	–	4	4	–	7
Wofford	3	–	5	5	–	7
Furman	3	–	5	4	–	8
The Citadel	1	–	7	3	–	9
VMI	0	–	8	0	–	12
$ – Conference champion; ^ – FCS playoff participant; As of November 22, 2026; Rankings from STATS Poll

The 2026 Wofford Terriers football team represented Wofford College as a member of the Southern Conference (SoCon) during the 2026 NCAA Division I FCS football season. The Terriers were led by fouth-year head coach Shawn Watson and played their home games at Gibbs Stadium in Spartanburg, South Carolina.

== Schedule ==
Date	Time	Opponent	Site	TV	Result	Attendance
August 29	6:00 p.m.	The Citadel	Gibbs Stadium; Spartanburg, SC (rivalry)	ESPN+	W 42–14	7,486
September 5	1:30 p.m.	Gardner–Webb*	Gibbs Stadium; Spartanburg, SC	ESPN+	W 17–13	3,527
September 12	12:00 p.m.	at Kent State*	Dix Stadium; Kent, OH	ESPN+	L 15–36	7,887
September 19	6:00 p.m.	at Chattanooga	Finley Stadium; Chattanooga, TN	ESPN+	L 7–41	7,205
September 26	6:00 p.m.	No. 12 Tennessee Tech	Gibbs Stadium; Spartanburg, SC	ESPN+	L 38–42	6,284
October 3	2:00 p.m.	at Furman	Paladin Stadium; Greenville, SC (rivalry)	ESPN+	W 32–25	9,957
October 10	2:00 p.m.	at Elon*	Rhodes Stadium; Elon, NC	FloFootball	W 16–0	5,379
October 17	1:30 p.m.	VMI^{†}	Gibbs Stadium; Spartanburg, SC	ESPN+	W 41–14	6,102
October 31	7:00 p.m.	at Samford	Pete Hanna Stadium; Homewood, AL	ESPN+	L 9–10	3,073
November 7	1:00 p.m.	at Western Carolina	E. J. Whitmire Stadium; Cullowhee, NC	ESPN+	L 10–26	9,524
November 14	1:00 p.m.	East Tennessee State	Gibbs Stadium; Spartanburg, SC	ESPN+	L 17–20	4,783
November 21	12:00 p.m.	at No. 25 (FBS) Ole Miss*	Vaught–Hemingway Stadium; Oxford, MS	SECN+	L 17–59	65,250
*Non-conference game; ^{†}Homecoming; Rankings from STATS Poll released prior to the game; All times are in Eastern time

== Game summaries ==
=== The Citadel (rivalry) ===
The Citadel Bulldogs (0–0) at Wofford Terriers (0–0) – Game summary

Quarter	1	2	3	4	Total
Bulldogs	0	0	7	7	14
Terriers	7	14	14	7	42

at Gibbs Stadium • Spartanburg, South Carolina

- Date: August 29
- Game time: 6:00 p.m.
- Game weather: Sunny • Temperature: 84 °F (29 °C) • Wind: E at 4 miles per hour (6.4 km/h)
- Game attendance: 7,486
- Referee: Jeff Page
- TV announcers (ESPN+): Pete Yanity, Jay Sonnhalter and Dave Friedman

Game information

First quarter

- WOF – Gerald Modest Jr. 15-yard run (Sam Spence kick), 3:28. Terriers 7–0. Drive: 8 plays, 79 yards, 3:31.

Second quarter

- WOF – Davis Penn 33-yard blocked punt return (Sam Spence kick), 14:43. Terriers 14–0.
- WOF – Gerald Modest Jr. 5-yard run (Sam Spence kick), 0:19. Terriers 21–0. Drive: 5 plays, 32 yards, 0:47.

Third quarter

- CIT – Sebastien Boyle 4-yard run (Evan Kiely kick), 7:28. Terriers 21–7. Drive: 12 plays, 75 yards, 7:32.
- WOF – Ivory Aikens 5-yard pass from Kaeden Gilstrap (Sam Spence kick), 2:17. Terriers 28–7. Drive: 11 plays, 75 yards, 5:11.
- WOF – Colby Alexander 1-yard pass from J.T. Fayard (Sam Spence kick), 0:48. Terriers 35–7. Drive: 3 plays, 8 yards, 1:19.

Fourth quarter

- WOF – Colby Alexander 19-yard pass from J.T. Fayard (Sam Spence kick), 5:32. Terriers 42–7. Drive: 9 plays, 66 yards, 4:36.
- CIT – Sebastien Boyle 6-yard run (Evan Kiely kick), 1:49. Terriers 42–14. Drive: 10 plays, 80 yards, 3:38.

Statistics	CIT	WOF
First downs	21	24
Plays–yards	69–351	57–341
Rushes–yards	45–227	30–160
Passing yards	124	181
Passing: comp–att–int	15–24–1	19–27–2
Turnovers	3	2
Time of possession	35:05	24:55

Team	Category	Player	Statistics
The Citadel	Passing	Quentin Hayes	12/20, 88 yards, INT
The Citadel	Rushing	Quentin Hayes	18 carries, 91 yards
The Citadel	Receiving	Damir Abdullah	3 receptions, 32 yards
Wofford	Passing	J.T. Fayard	18/26, 176 yards, 2 TD, 2 INT
Wofford	Rushing	Gerald Modest Jr.	19 carries, 105 yards, 2 TD
Wofford	Receiving	Gerald Modest Jr.	4 receptions, 39 yards

=== Gardner–Webb ===
Gardner–Webb Runnin' Bulldogs (0–1) at Wofford Terriers (1–0) – Game summary

Quarter	1	2	3	4	Total
Runnin' Bulldogs	3	0	7	3	13
Terriers	7	7	0	3	17

at Gibbs Stadium • Spartanburg, South Carolina

- Date: September 5
- Game time: 1:30 p.m.
- Game weather: Sunny • Temperature: 99 °F (37 °C) • Wind: N 2 MPH
- Game attendance: 3,527
- Referee: Todd Boyd
- TV: ESPN+

Game information
First quarter
- WOF – Ivory Aikens 97-yard kickoff return (Sam Spence kick), 14:49. Terriers 7–0.
- GWEB – Andrew Bontekoe 25-yard field goal, 1:20. Terriers 7–3. Drive: 12 plays, 56 yards, 5:05.

Second quarter

- WOF – Gerald Modest Jr. 9-yard run (Sam Spence kick), 2:37. Terriers 14–3. Drive: 10 plays, 79 yards, 3:46.

Third quarter

- GWEB – Randy Young 6-yard run (Tyler Simpson kick), 4:47. Terriers 14–10. Drive: 13 plays, 62 yards, 5:04.

Fourth quarter

- WOF – Sam Spence 32-yard field goal, 11:07. Terriers 17–10. Drive: 6 plays, 36 yards, 3:09.
- GWEB – Tyler Simpson 33-yard field goal, 5:37. Terriers 17–13. Drive: 7 plays, 82 yards, 2:53.

Statistics	GWEB	WOF
First downs	24	12
Plays–yards	82–438	55–208
Rushes–yards	28–60	33–88
Passing yards	378	120
Passing: comp–att–int	31–54–1	11–22–1
Turnovers	3	2
Time of possession	33:51	26:09

Team	Category	Player	Statistics
Gardner–Webb	Passing	Cole Pennington	31/54, 378 yards, INT
Gardner–Webb	Rushing	Adrian Cormier	8 carries, 32 yards
Gardner–Webb	Receiving	Kory Jones	6 receptions, 135 yards
Wofford	Passing	J. T. Fayard	11/22, 120 yards, INT
Wofford	Rushing	Gerald Modest Jr.	20 carries, 85 yards, TD
Wofford	Receiving	Colby Alexander	1 reception, 35 yards

=== at Kent State (FBS) ===
Wofford Terriers (2–0) at Kent State Golden Flashes (FBS) (0–1) – Game summary

Quarter	1	2	3	4	Total
Terriers	3	12	0	0	15
Golden Flashes (FBS)	7	7	0	22	36

at Dix Stadium • Kent, Ohio

- Date: September 12
- Game time: 12:00 p.m.
- Game weather: Rain • Temperature: 74 °F (23 °C) • Wind: SW 5 MPH
- Game attendance: 7,887
- Referee: Rick Warne
- TV announcers (ESPN+): Michael Reghi and Patrick Murray

Game information

First quarter

- KENT – Dru DeShields 12-yard run (Sean Leonard kick), 10:23. Golden Flashes 7–0. Drive: 9 plays, 83 yards, 4:32.
- WOF – Sam Spence 28-yard field goal, 3:20. Golden Flashes 7–3. Drive: 6 plays, 14 yards, 1:30.

Second quarter

- WOF – Gerald Modest Jr. 10-yard run (Sam Spence kick), 9:29. Terriers 10–7. Drive: 5 plays, 36 yards, 1:56.
- WOF – Team safety, 3:04. Terriers 12–7.
- KENT – Rafael Terrero Jr. 63-yard interception return (Sean Leonard kick), 1:50. Golden Flashes 14–12.
- WOF – Sam Spence 50-yard field goal, 0:02. Terriers 15–14. Drive: 7 plays, 44 yards, 1:50.

Third quarter

- No scoring plays.

Fourth quarter

- KENT – Jakorion Caffey 5-yard run (Dru DeShields–Wayne Harris pass), 14:21. Golden Flashes 22–15. Drive: 6 plays, 85 yards, 2:39.
- KENT – Dru DeShields 20-yard run (Sean Leonard kick), 8:27. Golden Flashes 29–15. Drive: 7 plays, 68 yards, 4:15.
- KENT – Wayne Harris 10-yard pass from Dru DeShields (Sean Leonard kick), 4:16. Golden Flashes 36–15. Drive: 5 plays, 57 yards, 2:57.

Statistics	WOF	KENT
First downs	10	21
Plays–yards	54–173	72–253
Rushes–yards	26–58	44–195
Passing yards	115	253
Passing: comp–att–int	13–27–2	17–28–2
Turnovers	2	3
Time of possession	22:38	37:22

Team	Category	Player	Statistics
Wofford	Passing	Ethan Drumm	9/16, 100 yards, 2 INT
Wofford	Rushing	Gerald Modest Jr.	14 carries, 56 yards, TD
Wofford	Receiving	Isaiah Scott	3 receptions, 47 yards
Kent State	Passing	Dru DeShields	16/25, 248 yards, TD, 2 INT
Kent State	Rushing	Dru DeShields	10 carries, 74 yards, 2 TD
Kent State	Receiving	Darealyst Clark	5 receptions, 90 yards

=== at Chattanooga ===
Wofford Terriers (2–1) at Chattanooga Mocs (1–2) – Game summary

Quarter	1	2	3	4	Total
Terriers	0	0	0	0	0
Mocs	0	0	0	0	0

at Finley Stadium • Chattanooga, Tennessee

- Date: September 19
- Game time: 6:00 p.m.
- TV: ESPN+

Game information

First quarter
Second quarter
Third quarter
Fourth quarter

Statistics	WOF	UTC
First downs		
Plays–yards		
Rushes–yards		
Passing yards		
Passing: comp–att–int		
Turnovers		
Time of possession		

Team	Category	Player	Statistics
Wofford	Passing		
Wofford	Rushing		
Wofford	Receiving		
Chattanooga	Passing		
Chattanooga	Rushing		
Chattanooga	Receiving		

=== No. 12 Tennessee Tech ===
No. 12 Tennessee Tech Golden Eagles (3–0) at Wofford Terriers (2–2) – Game summary

Quarter	1	2	3	4	Total
No. 12 Golden Eagles	7	7	7	21	42
Terriers	7	21	7	3	38

at Gibbs Stadium • Spartanburg, South Carolina

- Date: September 26
- Game time: 1:30 p.m.
- Game weather: Sunny • Temperature: 77 °F (25 °C) • Wind: W at 4 miles per hour (6.4 km/h)
- Game attendance: 6,284
- Referee: Jason Graham
- TV announcers (ESPN+): Jim Noble (play-by-play), Thom Henson (analyst) and Van Hipp (sideline)

Game information

First quarter

- WOF - Colby Alexander 40-yard pass from Ethan Drumm (Sam Spence kick), 12:35. Terriers 7–0. Drive: 5 plays, 75 yards, 2:25.
- TNTC - Qua Ashley 4-yard pass from Jax Leatherwood (Carter Brown kick), 1:51. Tied 7–7. Drive: 5 plays, 52 yards, 2:38.

Second quarter

- WOF - Isaiah Scott 10-yard pass from Ethan Drumm (Sam Spence kick), 9:29. Terriers 14–7. Drive: 6 plays, 40 yards, 2:22.
- WOF - Jack Ewell 76-yard pass from Ethan Drumm (Sam Spence kick), 5:01. Terriers 21–7. Drive: 1 play, 76 yards, 0:11.
- TNTC - Ivan Hoyt 10-yard pass from Jax Leatherwood (Carter Brown kick), 4:57. Terriers 21–14. Drive: 4 plays, 75 yards, 1:40.
- WOF - Terrence Honeywood 11-yard pass from Ethan Drumm (Sam Spence kick), 0:48. Terriers 28–14. Drive: 7 plays, 75 yards, 2:29.

Third quarter

- TNTC - Qua Ashley 100-yard kickoff return (Cater Brown kick), 14:48. Terriers 28–21. Drive: 0 plays, 100 yards, 0:12.
- WOF - Gerald Modest Jr. 14-yard run (Sam Spence kick), 10:42. Terriers 35–21. Drive: 9 plays, 65 yards, 4:06.

Fourth quarter

- TNTC - Eric Weatherly 24-yard pass from Jax Leatherwood (Carter Brown kick), 12:52. Terriers 35–28. Drive: 7 plays, 43 yards, 2:08.
- TNTC - M.J. Flowers 8-yard pass from Jax Leatherwood (Carter Brown kick), 3:23. Tied 35–35. Drive: 14 plays, 69 yards, 7:19.
- WOF - Sam Spence 53-yard field goal, 1:46. Terriers 38–35. Drive: 6 plays, 42 yards, 1:32.
- TNTC - Eric Weatherly 15-yard pass from Jax Leatherwood (Carter Brown kick), 1:06. Golden Eagles 42–38. Drive: 3 plays, 30 yards, 0:30.

Statistics	TNTC	WOF
First downs	27	20
Plays–yards	77–501	54–380
Rushes–yards	27–74	23–76
Passing yards	427	304
Passing: comp–att–int	38–48–1	19–31–0
Turnovers	1	0
Time of possession	39:22	20:38

Team	Category	Player	Statistics
Tennessee Tech	Passing	Jax Leatherwood	38/48, 427 yards, 5 TD, INT
Tennessee Tech	Rushing	M.J. Flowers	14 carries, 44 yards
Tennessee Tech	Receiving	Eric Weatherly	9 receptions, 100 yards, 2 TD
Wofford	Passing	Ethan Drumm	19/31, 304 yards, 4 TD
Wofford	Rushing	Gerald Modest Jr.	17 carries, 84 yards, TD
Wofford	Receiving	Colby Alexander	4 receptions, 100 yards, TD

=== at Furman (rivalry) ===
Wofford Terriers (2–3) at Furman Paladins (2–3) – Game summary

Quarter	1	2	3	4	Total
Terriers	0	0	0	0	0
Paladins	0	0	0	0	0

at Paladin Stadium • Greenville, South Carolina

- Date: October 3
- Game time: 2:00 p.m.
- TV: ESPN+

Game information

First quarter
Second quarter
Third quarter
Fourth quarter

Statistics	WOF	FUR
First downs		
Plays–yards		
Rushes–yards		
Passing yards		
Passing: comp–att–int		
Turnovers		
Time of possession		

Team	Category	Player	Statistics
Wofford	Passing		
Wofford	Rushing		
Wofford	Receiving		
Furman	Passing		
Furman	Rushing		
Furman	Receiving		

=== at Elon ===
Wofford Terriers (3–3) at Elon Phoenix (4–2) – Game summary

Quarter	1	2	3	4	Total
Terriers	0	0	0	0	0
Phoenix	0	0	0	0	0

at Rhodes Stadium • Elon, North Carolina

- Date: October 10
- Game time: 2:00 p.m.

Game information

First quarter
Second quarter
Third quarter
Fourth quarter

Statistics	WOF	ELON
First downs		
Plays–yards		
Rushes–yards		
Passing yards		
Passing: comp–att–int		
Turnovers		
Time of possession		

Team	Category	Player	Statistics
Wofford	Passing		
Wofford	Rushing		
Wofford	Receiving		
Elon	Passing		
Elon	Rushing		
Elon	Receiving		

=== VMI ===
VMI Keydets (0–6) at Wofford Terriers (4–3) – Game summary

Quarter	1	2	3	4	Total
Keydets	0	0	0	0	0
Terriers	0	0	0	0	0

at Gibbs Stadium • Spartanburg, South Carolina

- Date: October 17
- Game time: 1:30 p.m.

Game information

First quarter
Second quarter
Third quarter
Fourth quarter

Statistics	VMI	WOF
First downs		
Plays–yards		
Rushes–yards		
Passing yards		
Passing: comp–att–int		
Turnovers		
Time of possession		

Team	Category	Player	Statistics
VMI	Passing		
VMI	Rushing		
VMI	Receiving		
Wofford	Passing		
Wofford	Rushing		
Wofford	Receiving		

=== at Samford ===
Wofford Terriers (5–3) at Samford Bulldogs (2–6) – Game summary

Quarter	1	2	3	4	Total
Terriers	0	0	0	0	0
Bulldogs	0	0	0	0	0

at Pete Hanna Stadium • Homewood, Alabama

- Date: October 31
- Game time: 7:00 p.m.

Statistics	WOF	SAM
First downs		
Total yards		
Rushing yards		
Passing yards		
Passing: Comp–Att–Int		
Time of possession		

Team	Category	Player	Statistics
Wofford	Passing		
Wofford	Rushing		
Wofford	Receiving		
Samford	Passing		
Samford	Rushing		
Samford	Receiving		

=== at Western Carolina ===
Wofford Terriers (5–4) at Western Carolina Catamounts (4–5) – Game summary

Quarter	1	2	3	4	Total
Terriers	0	0	0	0	0
Catamounts	0	0	0	0	0

at E. J. Whitmire Stadium • Cullowhee, North Carolina

- Date: November 7
- Game time: 1:00 p.m.

Game information

First quarter
Second quarter
Third quarter
Fourth quarter

Statistics	WOF	WCU
First downs		
Plays–yards		
Rushes–yards		
Passing yards		
Passing: comp–att–int		
Turnovers		
Time of possession		

Team	Category	Player	Statistics
Wofford	Passing		
Wofford	Rushing		
Wofford	Receiving		
Western Carolina	Passing		
Western Carolina	Rushing		
Western Carolina	Receiving		

=== East Tennessee State ===
East Tennessee State Buccaneers (6–4) at Wofford Terriers (5–5) – Game summary

Quarter	1	2	3	4	Total
Buccaneers	0	0	0	0	0
Terriers	0	0	0	0	0

at Gibbs Stadium • Spartanburg, South Carolina

- Date: November 14
- Game time: 1:30 p.m.
- TV: ESPN+

Statistics	ETSU	WOF
First downs		
Total yards		
Rushing yards		
Passing yards		
Passing: Comp–Att–Int		
Time of possession		

Team	Category	Player	Statistics
East Tennessee State	Passing		
East Tennessee State	Rushing		
East Tennessee State	Receiving		
Wofford	Passing		
Wofford	Rushing		
Wofford	Receiving		

=== at No. 25 (FBS) Ole Miss ===
Wofford Terriers (5–6) at No. 25 (FBS) Ole Miss Rebels (6–4) – Game summary

Quarter	1	2	3	4	Total
Terriers	0	0	0	0	0
No. 25 (FBS) Rebels	0	0	0	0	0

at Vaught–Hemingway Stadium • Oxford, Mississippi

- Date: November 21
- Game time: 1:00 p.m.

Statistics	WOF	MISS
First downs		
Plays–yards		
Rushes–yards		
Passing yards		
Passing: comp–att–int		
Time of possession		

Team	Category	Player	Statistics
Wofford	Passing		
Wofford	Rushing		
Wofford	Receiving		
Ole Miss	Passing		
Ole Miss	Rushing		
Ole Miss	Receiving		

== Rankings ==
Ranking movements Legend: ██ Increase in ranking ██ Decrease in ranking — = Not ranked RV = Received votes
	Week														
Poll	Pre	1	2	3	4	5	6	7	8	9	10	11	12	13	Final
STATS	—	—	RV	RV	—	—	—	—	RV	RV					
Coaches	RV	RV	RV	RV	—	—	—	RV	RV	RV					
