= 2026 Samford Bulldogs football team =

American college football season

2026 Samford Bulldogs football
- Conference: Southern Conference
- Record: 4–8 (4–4 SoCon)
- Head coach: John Grass (1st season)
- Defensive coordinator: Mickey Conn (1st season)
- Home stadium: Pete Hanna Stadium

2026 Southern Conference football standings
	Conf.			Overall
Team	W		L	W		L
No. 9 Mercer $^	7	–	1	10	–	2
No. 13 Tennessee Tech	6	–	2	9	–	3
Chattanooga	6	–	2	7	–	5
East Tennessee State	5	–	3	7	–	5
Western Carolina	5	–	3	7	–	5
Samford	4	–	4	4	–	7
Wofford	3	–	5	5	–	7
Furman	3	–	5	4	–	8
The Citadel	1	–	7	3	–	9
VMI	0	–	8	0	–	12
$ – Conference champion; ^ – FCS playoff participant; As of November 22, 2026; Rankings from STATS Poll

The 2026 Samford Bulldogs football team represented Samford University as a member of the Southern Conference (SoCon) during the 2026 NCAA Division I FCS football season. The Bulldogs played their home games at Pete Hanna Stadium in Homewood, Alabama.

The Bulldogs were led by first-year head coach John Grass. Grass was announced as Samford's 37th head football coach on December 3, 2025 as he replaced the fired Chris Hatcher and his interim replacement Scot Sloan.

== Schedule ==
Date	Time	Opponent	Site	TV	Result	Attendance
August 29	6:00 p.m.	vs. North Alabama*	Wicks Family Field at Joe Davis Stadium; Huntsville, AL (Story Financial Partners Bowl)	ESPN+	L 10–22	5,493
September 3	6:00 p.m.	Southern Illinois*	Pete Hanna Stadium; Homewood, AL	ESPN+	L 18–22	6,713
September 12	6:00 p.m.	at No. 12 Tennessee Tech	Tucker Stadium; Cookeville, TN	ESPN+	L 19–45	3,428
September 26	2:30 p.m.	VMI	Pete Hanna Stadium; Homewood, AL	ESPN+	W 45–7	10,033
October 3	2:30 p.m.	at UAB*	Protective Stadium; Birmingham, AL	ESPN+	L 14–33	22,126
October 10	12:00 p.m.	at Chattanooga	Finley Stadium; Chattanooga, TN	ESPN+	L 3–19	3,308
October 17	6:00 p.m.	No. 18 Mercer	Pete Hanna Stadium; Homewood, AL	ESPN+	L 21–31	5,071
October 24	1:00 p.m.	at Furman	Paladin Stadium; Greenville, SC	ESPN+	W 13–6	9,407
October 31	6:00 p.m.	Wofford	Pete Hanna Stadium; Homewood, AL	ESPN+	W 10–9	3,073
November 7	12:00 p.m.	at No. 19т East Tennessee State	William B. Greene Jr. Stadium; Johnson City, TN	ESPN+	W 37–35	7,845
November 14	2:30 p.m.	Western Carolina^{†}	Pete Hanna Stadium; Homewood, AL	ESPN+	L 12–17	5,713
November 21	2:30 p.m.	at Auburn*	Jordan-Hare Stadium; Auburn, AL	SECN+	L 17–59	88,043
*Non-conference game; ^{†}Homecoming; Rankings from STATS Poll released prior to the game; All times are in Central time

== Game summaries ==
=== vs. North Alabama ===
North Alabama Lions (0–0) vs. Samford Bulldogs (0–0) – Game summary

Quarter	1	2	3	4	Total
Lions	0	16	0	6	22
Bulldogs	0	7	0	3	10

at Joe W. Davis Stadium • Huntsville, Alabama

- Date: August 29
- Game time: 6:00 p.m.
- Game weather: Sunny • Temperature: 91 °F (33 °C) • Wind: NW at 4 miles per hour (6.4 km/h)
- Game attendance: 5,493
- Referee: Branden McCain
- TV announcers (ESPN+): Benjamin Ray, Bryan Neece and Gyvan Hammons

Game information

First quarter

- No scoring plays.

Second quarter

- UNA – Xavier Johnson 95-yard pass from Destin Wade (Ian Vachon kick), 8:44. Lions 7–0. Drive: 4 plays, 96 yards, 1:32.
- UNA – Team safety, 6:58. Lions 9–0.
- SAM – Marquise Henderson 86-yard pass from Gabarri Johnson (Ty Ippolito kick), 4:19. Lions 9–7. Drive: 1 play, 86 yards, 0:11.
- UNA – Roderick Taylor Jr. 3-yard run (Ian Vachon kick), 0:21. Lions 16–7. Drive: 13 plays, 88 yards, 3:58.

Third quarter

- No scoring plays.

Fourth quarter

- SAM – Ty Ippolito 26-yard field goal, 14:53. Lions 16–10. Drive: 5 plays, 48 yards, 1:23.
- UNA – Ty Watkins 1-yard run (pass failed), 6:38. Lions 22–10. Drive: 10 plays, 91 yards, 4:49.

Statistics	UNA	SAM
First downs	10	15
Plays–yards	58–237	66–394
Rushes–yards	25–(-8)	47–165
Passing yards	245	229
Passing: comp–att–int	19–33–1	13–19–0
Turnovers	1	0
Time of possession	27:06	32:54

Team	Category	Player	Statistics
North Alabama	Passing	Gabarri Johnson	19/33, 245 yards, TD, INT
North Alabama	Rushing	Keion Dunlap	2 carries, 4 yards
North Alabama	Receiving	Marquise Henderson	5 receptions, 151 yards, TD
Samford	Passing	Destin Wade	13/19, 229 yards, TD
Samford	Rushing	Jalen Fletcher	11 carries, 79 yards
Samford	Receiving	Xavier Johnson	5 receptions, 129 yards, TD

=== Southern Illinois ===
Southern Illinois Salukis (0–1) at Samford Bulldogs (0–1) – Game summary

Quarter	1	2	3	4	Total
Salukis	9	6	0	7	22
Bulldogs	0	7	8	3	18

at Pete Hanna Stadium • Homewood, Alabama

- Date: September 3
- Game time: 6:00 p.m.
- Game weather: Sunny • Temperature: 93 °F (34 °C)
- Game attendance: 6,713
- Referee: Bruce Austin
- TV: ESPN+

Game information

First quarter

- SIU – Karsen Konkel 2-yard pass from Jake Curry (Seth Adams kick), 10:47. Salukis 7–0. Drive: 8 plays, 75 yards, 4:13.
- SIU – Team safety, 7:48. Salukis 9–0.

Second quarter

- SAM – Cayden Aukerman 5-yard pass from Gabarri Johnson (Ty Ippolito kick), 8:13. Salukis 9–7. Drive: 8 plays, 71 yards, 4:02.
- SIU – Miles Marshall 7-yard pass from Jake Curry (pass failed), 0:34. Salukis 15–7. Drive: 9 plays, 46 yards, 3:30.

Third quarter

- SAM – Cayden Aukerman 5-yard pass from Gabarri Johnson (Gabarri Johnson–Cayden Aukerman pass), 2:18. Tied 15–15. Drive: 9 plays, 72 yards, 4:08.

Fourth quarter

- SIU – Lem Wash 3-yard run (Seth Adams kick), 10:50. Salukis 22–15. Drive: 4 plays, 23 yards, 2:13.
- SAM – Ty Ippolito 42-yard field goal, 6:42. Salukis 22–18. Drive: 12 plays, 50 yards, 4:08.

Statistics	SIU	SAM
First downs	18	15
Plays–yards	72–334	63–272
Rushes–yards	43–181	27–70
Passing yards	153	202
Passing: comp–att–int	13–29–0	21–36–1
Turnovers	0	1
Time of possession	32:34	27:26

Team	Category	Player	Statistics
Southern Illinois	Passing	Jake Curry	13/29, 153 yards, 2 TD
Southern Illinois	Rushing	Chandler Chapman	24 carries, 133 yards
Southern Illinois	Receiving	Markell Quick	3 receptions, 47 yards
Samford	Passing	Gabarri Johnson	20/35, 156 yards, 2 TD, INT
Samford	Rushing	Ken Cherry	7 carries, 44 yards
Samford	Receiving	Preston Bird	3 receptions, 63 yards

=== at No. 12 Tennessee Tech ===
Samford Bulldogs (0–2) at No. 12 Tennessee Tech Golden Eagles (2–0) – Game summary

Quarter	1	2	3	4	Total
Bulldogs	3	6	10	0	19
No. 12 Golden Eagles	14	17	14	0	45

at Tucker Stadium • Cookeville, Tennessee

- Date: September 12
- Game time: 6:00 p.m.
- Game weather: Sunny • Temperature: 78 °F (26 °C)
- Game attendance: 3,428
- Referee: Jake Grombach
- TV announcers (ESPN+): Jacob Vinson (play-by-play) and Sam Brooks (analyst)

Game information

First quarter

- TNTC – Tre Holloway 48-yard pass from Jax Leatherwood (Carter Brown kick), 12:18. Golden Eagles 7–0. Drive: 5 plays, 75 yards, 2:48.
- TNTC – Qua Ashley 56-yard run (Carter Brown kick), 8:20. Golden Eagles 14–0. Drive: 4 plays, 75 yards, 1:37.
- SAM – Ty Ippolito 54-yard field goal, 4:07. Golden Eagles 14–3. Drive: 11 plays, 39 yards, 4:13.

Second quarter

- TNTC – Tre Holloway 43-yard pass from Jax Leatherwood (Carter Brown kick), 12:43. Golden Eagles 21–3. Drive: 5 plays, 70 yards, 2:17.
- TNTC – Tre Holloway 4-yard run (Carter Brown kick), 8:48. Golden Eagles 28–3. Drive: 7 plays, 66 yards, 4:31.
- SAM – Ty Ippolito 22-yard field goal, 4:55. Golden Eagles 28–6. Drive: 10 plays, 71 yards, 3:53.
- TNTC – Carter Brown 49-yard field goal, 1:01. Golden Eagles 31–6. Drive: 8 plays, 34 yards, 3:54.
- SAM – Ty Ippolito 58-yard field goal, 0:02. Golden Eagles 31–9. Drive: 6 plays, 19 yards, 1:01.

Third quarter

- SAM – Ty Ippolito 28-yard field goal, 11:28. Golden Eagles 31–12. Drive: 8 plays, 64 yards, 3:32.
- TNTC – Tre Holloway 76-yard punt return (Carter Brown kick), 7:29. Golden Eagles 38–12.
- SAM – Gabarri Johnson 7-yard run (Ty Ippolito kick), 3:55. Golden Eagles 38–19. Drive: 8 plays, 68 yards, 3:34.
- TNTC – Joe Hall III 0-yard fumble return (Carter Brown kick), 0:51. Golden Eagles 45–19.

Fourth quarter

- No scoring plays.

Statistics	SAM	TNTC
First downs	32	18
Plays–yards	75–320	54–409
Rushes–yards	25–39	32–180
Passing yards	281	229
Passing: comp–att–int	24–50–0	15–22–0
Turnovers	1	0
Time of possession	30:02	29:58

Team	Category	Player	Statistics
Samford	Passing	Gabarri Johnson	23/49, 245 yards
Samford	Rushing	Ken Cherry	5 carries, 21 yards
Samford	Receiving	Cayden Aukerman	3 receptions, 73 yards
Tennessee Tech	Passing	Jax Leatherwood	15/22, 229 yards, 2 TD
Tennessee Tech	Rushing	Qua Ashley	5 carries, 81 yards, TD
Tennessee Tech	Receiving	Tre Holloway	6 receptions, 124 yards, 2 TD

=== VMI ===
VMI Keydets (0–4) at Samford Bulldogs (0–3) – Game summary

Quarter	1	2	3	4	Total
Keydets	0	0	0	0	0
Bulldogs	0	0	0	0	0

at Pete Hanna Stadium • Homewood, Alabama

- Date: September 26
- Game time: 2:30 p.m.
- Game attendance: 10,033
- TV: ESPN+

Game information

First quarter
Second quarter
Third quarter
Fourth quarter

Statistics	VMI	SAM
First downs		
Plays–yards		
Rushes–yards		
Passing yards		
Passing: comp–att–int		
Turnovers		
Time of possession		

Team	Category	Player	Statistics
VMI	Passing		
VMI	Rushing		
VMI	Receiving		
Samford	Passing		
Samford	Rushing		
Samford	Receiving		

=== at UAB (FBS) ===
Samford Bulldogs (1–3) at UAB Blazers (2–2) – Game summary

Quarter	1	2	3	4	Total
Bulldogs	0	0	0	0	0
Blazers (FBS)	0	0	0	0	0

at Protective Stadium • Birmingham, Alabama

- Date: October 3
- Game time: 2:30 p.m.
- TV: ESPN+

Game information

First quarter
Second quarter
Third quarter
Fourth quarter

Statistics	SAM	UAB
First downs		
Plays–yards		
Rushes–yards		
Passing yards		
Passing: comp–att–int		
Turnovers		
Time of possession		

Team	Category	Player	Statistics
Samford	Passing		
Samford	Rushing		
Samford	Receiving		
UAB	Passing		
UAB	Rushing		
UAB	Receiving		

=== at Chattanooga ===
Samford Bulldogs (1–4) at Chattanooga Mocs (3–2) – Game summary

Quarter	1	2	3	4	Total
Bulldogs	0	0	0	0	0
Mocs	0	0	0	0	0

at Finley Stadium • Chattanooga, Tennessee

- Date: October 10
- Game time: 12:00 p.m.

Game information

First quarter
Second quarter
Third quarter
Fourth quarter

Statistics	SAM	UTC
First downs		
Plays–yards		
Rushes–yards		
Passing yards		
Passing: comp–att–int		
Turnovers		
Time of possession		

Team	Category	Player	Statistics
Samford	Passing		
Samford	Rushing		
Samford	Receiving		
Chattanooga	Passing		
Chattanooga	Rushing		
Chattanooga	Receiving		

=== No. 18 Mercer ===
No. 18 Mercer Bears (5–2) at Samford Bulldogs (1–5) – Game summary

Quarter	1	2	3	4	Total
No. 18 Bears	0	0	0	0	0
Bulldogs	0	0	0	0	0

at Pete Hanna Stadium • Homewood, AL

- Date: October 17
- Game time: 6:00 p.m.

Statistics	MER	SAM
First downs		
Total yards		
Rushing yards		
Passing yards		
Passing: Comp–Att–Int		
Time of possession		

Team	Category	Player	Statistics
Mercer	Passing		
Mercer	Rushing		
Mercer	Receiving		
Samford	Passing		
Samford	Rushing		
Samford	Receiving		

=== at Furman ===
Samford Bulldogs (1–6) at Furman Paladins (2–5) – Game summary

Quarter	1	2	3	4	Total
Bulldogs	0	0	0	0	0
Paladins	0	0	0	0	0

at Paladin Stadium • Greenville, SC

- Date: October 24
- Game time: 1:00 p.m.

Game information

First quarter
Second quarter
Third quarter
Fourth quarter

Statistics	SAM	FUR
First downs		
Plays–yards		
Rushes–yards		
Passing yards		
Passing: comp–att–int		
Turnovers		
Time of possession		

Team	Category	Player	Statistics
Samford	Passing		
Samford	Rushing		
Samford	Receiving		
Furman	Passing		
Furman	Rushing		
Furman	Receiving		

=== Wofford ===
Wofford Terriers (5–3) at Samford Bulldogs (2–6) – Game summary

Quarter	1	2	3	4	Total
Terriers	0	0	0	0	0
Bulldogs	0	0	0	0	0

at Pete Hanna Stadium • Homewood, AL

- Date: October 31
- Game time: 6:00 p.m.

Statistics	WOF	SAM
First downs		
Total yards		
Rushing yards		
Passing yards		
Passing: Comp–Att–Int		
Time of possession		

Team	Category	Player	Statistics
Wofford	Passing		
Wofford	Rushing		
Wofford	Receiving		
Samford	Passing		
Samford	Rushing		
Samford	Receiving		

=== at No. 19т East Tennessee State ===
Samford Bulldogs (3–6) at No. 19т East Tennessee State Buccaneers (6–3) – Game summary

Quarter	1	2	3	4	Total
Bulldogs	0	0	0	0	0
No. 19т Buccaneers	0	0	0	0	0

at William B. Greene Jr. Stadium • Johnson City, Tennessee

- Date: November 7
- Game time: 12:00 p.m.

Game information

First quarter
Second quarter
Third quarter
Fourth quarter

Statistics	SAM	ETSU
First downs		
Plays–yards		
Rushes–yards		
Passing yards		
Passing: comp–att–int		
Turnovers		
Time of possession		

Team	Category	Player	Statistics
Samford	Passing		
Samford	Rushing		
Samford	Receiving		
East Tennessee State	Passing		
East Tennessee State	Rushing		
East Tennessee State	Receiving		

=== Western Carolina ===
Western Carolina Catamounts (5–5) at Samford Bulldogs (4–6) – Game summary

Quarter	1	2	3	4	Total
Catamounts	0	0	0	0	0
Bulldogs	0	0	0	0	0

at Pete Hanna Stadium • Homewood, AL

- Date: November 14
- Game time: 2:30 p.m.

Statistics	WCU	SAM
First downs		
Total yards		
Rushing yards		
Passing yards		
Passing: Comp–Att–Int		
Time of possession		

Team	Category	Player	Statistics
Western Carolina	Passing		
Western Carolina	Rushing		
Western Carolina	Receiving		
Samford	Passing		
Samford	Rushing		
Samford	Receiving		

=== at Auburn (FBS) ===
Samford Bulldogs (4–7) at Auburn Tigers (6–4) – Game summary

Quarter	1	2	3	4	Total
Bulldogs	0	0	0	0	0
Tigers (FBS)	0	0	0	0	0

at Jordan Hare Stadium • Auburn, Alabama

- Date: November 21
- Game time: 2:30 p.m.

Game information

First quarter
Second quarter
Third quarter
Fourth quarter

Statistics	SAM	AUB
First downs		
Plays–yards		
Rushes–yards		
Passing yards		
Passing: comp–att–int		
Turnovers		
Time of possession		

Team	Category	Player	Statistics
Samford	Passing		
Samford	Rushing		
Samford	Receiving		
Auburn	Passing		
Auburn	Rushing		
Auburn	Receiving		
