= 2026 Furman Paladins football team =

American college football season

2026 Furman Paladins football
- Conference: Southern Conference
- Record: 4–8 (3–5 SoCon)
- Head coach: Clay Hendrix (10th season)
- Offensive coordinator: Justin Roper (5th season)
- Defensive coordinator: Chad Byers (5th season)
- Home stadium: Paladin Stadium

2026 Southern Conference football standings
	Conf.			Overall
Team	W		L	W		L
No. 9 Mercer $^	7	–	1	10	–	2
No. 13 Tennessee Tech	6	–	2	9	–	3
Chattanooga	6	–	2	7	–	5
East Tennessee State	5	–	3	7	–	5
Western Carolina	5	–	3	7	–	5
Samford	4	–	4	4	–	7
Wofford	3	–	5	5	–	7
Furman	3	–	5	4	–	8
The Citadel	1	–	7	3	–	9
VMI	0	–	8	0	–	12
$ – Conference champion; ^ – FCS playoff participant; As of November 22, 2026; Rankings from STATS Poll

The 2026 Furman Paladins football team represented Furman University as a member of the Southern Conference (SoCon) during the 2026 NCAA Division I FCS football season. The Paladins were led by tenth-year head coach Clay Hendrix and played their home games at Paladin Stadium in Greenville, South Carolina.

== Schedule ==
Date	Time	Opponent	Site	TV	Result	Attendance
August 27	7:00 p.m.	Anderson (SC)*	Paladin Stadium; Greenville, SC	ESPN+	W 20–3	8,147
September 5	3:30 p.m.	at No. 20 (FBS) Tennessee*	Neyland Stadium; Knoxville, TN	SECN+	L 9–56	101,915
September 12	6:00 p.m.	at No. 18 Mercer	Five Star Stadium; Macon, GA	ESPN+	W 20–13	5,079
September 19	7:00 p.m.	No. 18 South Carolina State*	Paladin Stadium; Greenville, SC	ESPN+	L 17–20	9,217
September 26	2:00 p.m.	at Richmond*	E. Claiborne Robins Stadium; Richmond, VA	ESPN+	L 9–13	6,558
October 3	2:00 p.m.	Wofford	Paladin Stadium; Greenville, SC (rivalry)	ESPN+	L 25–32	9,957
October 10	3:30 p.m.	at No. 15 Tennessee Tech	Tucker Stadium; Cookeville, TN	ESPN+	L 15–20	
October 24	2:00 p.m.	Samford^{†}	Paladin Stadium; Greenville, SC	ESPN+	L 6–13	9,407
October 31	2:00 p.m.	Western Carolina	Paladin Stadium; Greenville, SC	ESPN+	L 26–27	7,237
November 7	2:00 p.m.	at The Citadel	Johnson Hagood Stadium; Charleston, SC (rivalry)	ESPN+	W 24–14	12,711
November 14	1:00 p.m.	Chattanooga	Paladin Stadium; Greenville, SC	ESPN+	L 10–17	7,207
November 21	12:00 p.m.	at VMI	Alumni Memorial Field; Lexington, VA	ESPN+	W 35–3	4,370
*Non-conference game; ^{†}Homecoming; Rankings from STATS Poll released prior to the game; All times are in Eastern time

== Game summaries ==
=== Anderson (SC) (DII) ===
Anderson (SC) Trojans (0–0) at Furman Paladins (0–0) – Game summary

Quarter	1	2	3	4	Total
Trojans (DII)	0	3	0	0	3
Paladins	0	17	0	3	20

at Paladin Stadium • Greenville, South Carolina

- Date: August 27
- Game time: 7:00 p.m.
- Game weather: Sunny • Temperature: 82 °F (28 °C) • Wind: SW at 4 miles per hour (6.4 km/h)
- Game attendance: 8,147
- Referee: Jason Graham
- TV announcers (ESPN+): Brock Bowling and Cole Neely

Game information

First quarter

- No scoring plays.

Second quarter

- FUR – Nathan Chapman 40-yard field goal, 7:10. Paladins 3–0. Drive: 6 plays, 52 yards, 2:23.
- FUR – Ben Croasdale 4-yard run (Nathan Chapman kick), 3:02. Paladins 10–0. Drive: 4 plays, 63 yards, 1:46.
- AND – Ross Burnette 28-yard field goal, 1:16. Paladins 10–3. Drive: 9 plays, 64 yards, 1:46.
- FUR – Ben Croasdale 1-yard run (Nathan Chapman kick), 0:00. Paladins 17–3. Drive: 9 plays, 73 yards, 1:10.

Third quarter

- No scoring plays.

Fourth quarter

- FUR – Nathan Chapman 30-yard field goal, 9:05. Paladins 20–3. Drive: 11 plays, 42 yards, 4:19.

Statistics	AND	FUR
First downs	11	21
Plays–yards	54–160	72–451
Rushes–yards	23–6	44–268
Passing yards	154	183
Passing: comp–att–int	19–31–0	15–28–1
Turnovers	1	1
Time of possession	28:51	31:09

Team	Category	Player	Statistics
Anderson (SC)	Passing	Wilson Edwards	19/31, 154 yards
Anderson (SC)	Rushing	Zaidon Gunn	7 carries, 14 yards
Anderson (SC)	Receiving	Kenneth Brown	6 receptions, 75 yards
Furman	Passing	Jake Garcia	15/28, 183 yards, INT
Furman	Rushing	CJ Nettles	10 carries, 99 yards
Furman	Receiving	Daniel Haughton	5 receptions, 87 yards

=== at No. 20 (FBS) Tennessee ===
Furman Paladins (1–0) at No. 20 (FBS) Tennessee Volunteers (0–0) – Game summary

Quarter	1	2	3	4	Total
Paladins	0	0	3	6	9
No. 20 (FBS) Volunteers	7	21	21	7	56

at Neyland Stadium • Knoxville, Tennessee

- Date: September 5
- Game time: 3:30 p.m.
- Game weather: Sunny • Temperature: 90 °F (32 °C)
- Game attendance: 101,915
- Referee: Marc Curles
- TV announcers (SECN+): Richard Cross, Max Starks and Ashlyn Sullivan

Game information

First quarter

- TENN – Ethan Davis 17-yard pass from Faizon Brandon (Cooper Ranvier kick), 10:42. Volunteers 7–0. Drive: 8 plays, 60 yards, 2:59.

Second quarter

- TENN – Faizon Brandon 6-yard run (Cooper Ranvier kick), 11:14. Volunteers 14–0. Drive: 7 plays, 42 yards, 3:00.
- TENN – DeSean Bishop 1-yard run (Cooper Ranvier kick), 3:05. Volunteers 21–0. Drive: 11 plays, 66 yards, 4:51.
- TENN – Faizon Brandon 7-yard run (Cooper Ranvier kick), 0:17. Volunteers 28–0. Drive: 8 plays, 82 yards, 1:26.

Third quarter

- TENN – Mike Matthews 55-yard pass from Faizon Brandon (Cooper Ranvier kick), 13:54. Volunteers 35–0. Drive: 3 plays, 76 yards, 0:59.
- TENN – Mike Matthews 57-yard pass from Faizon Brandon (Cooper Ranvier kick), 11:38. Volunteers 42–0. Drive: 3 plays, 80 yards, 1:05.
- FUR – Nathan Chapman 50-yard field goal, 5:55. Volunteers 42–3. Drive: 6 plays, 5 yards, 3:31.
- TENN – TK Keys 22-yard pass from George MacIntyre (Cooper Ranvier kick), 1:50. Volunteers 49–3. Drive: 10 plays, 75 yards, 4:05.

Fourth quarter

- FUR – Isaiah Davis 23-yard run (run failed), 13:13. Volunteers 49–9. Drive: 3 plays, 16 yards, 0:42.
- TENN – Justin Baker 73-yard run (Josh Turbyville kick), 11:40. Volunteers 56–9. Drive: 3 plays, 90 yards, 1:23.

Statistics	FUR	TENN
First downs	10	29
Plays–yards	58–221	74–638
Rushes–yards	36–178	47–329
Passing yards	43	309
Passing: comp–att–int	11–22–0	21–27–0
Turnovers	0	2
Time of possession	27:51	32:02

Team	Category	Player	Statistics
Furman	Passing	Jake Garcia	8/17, 36 yards
Furman	Rushing	Isaiah Davis	8 carries, 113 yards, TD
Furman	Receiving	Daniel Haughton	4 receptions, 13 yards
Tennessee	Passing	Faizon Brandon	13/17, 226 yards, 3 TD
Tennessee	Rushing	DeSean Bishop	14 carries, 97 yards, TD
Tennessee	Receiving	Mike Matthews	4 receptions, 132 yards, 2 TD

=== at No. 18 Mercer ===
Furman Paladins (1–1) at No. 18 Mercer Bears (2–0) – Game summary

Quarter	1	2	3	4	Total
Paladins	3	0	7	10	20
No. 18 Bears	3	0	3	7	13

at Five Star Stadium • Macon, Georgia

- Date: September 12
- Game time: 6:00 p.m.
- Game attendance: 5,079
- TV announcers (ESPN+): Frank Malloy (play-by-play) and Phil Cox (analyst)

Game information

First quarter

- FUR - Nathan Chapman 44-yard field goal, 6:27. Paladins 3–0. Drive: 10 plays, 50 yards, 3:27.
- MER - Simon Zeidan 54-yard field goal, 2:41. Tied 3–3. Drive: 7 plays, 33 yards, 3:40.

Second quarter

- No scoring plays.

Third quarter

- MER - Simon Zeidan 47-yard field goal, 8:14. Bears 6–3. Drive: 7 plays, -8 yards, 1:24.
- FUR - Daniel Haughton 46-yard pass from Jake Garcia (Nathan Chapman kick), 1:09. Paladins 10–6. Drive: 1 play, 46 yards, 0:09.

Fourth quarter

- MER - JP Pickles 1-yard run (Simon Zeidan kick), 13:20. Bears 13–10. Drive: 9 plays, 74 yards, 2:45.
- FUR - Nathan Chapman 43-yard field goal, 4:53. Tied 13–13. Drive: 4 plays, 8 yards, 2:06.
- FUR - Ben Croasdale 47-yard run (Nathan Chapman kick), 0:47. Paladins 20–13. Drive: 6 plays, 38 yards, 1:07.

Statistics	FUR	MER
First downs	14	15
Total yards	315	361
Rushing yards	157	164
Passing yards	158	197
Passing: Comp–Att–Int	18–28–2	19–36–4
Time of possession	28:56	31:04

Team	Category	Player	Statistics
Furman	Passing	Jake Garcia	18/28, 158 yards, TD, 2 INT
Furman	Rushing	Ben Croasdale	6 carries, 74 yards, TD
Furman	Receiving	Daniel Haughton	8 receptions, 103 yards, TD
Mercer	Passing	Jaylen King	18/35, 196 yards, 4 INT
Mercer	Rushing	Zahmari Palode-Gary	13 carries, 87 yards
Mercer	Receiving	Travion Solomon	6 receptions, 120 yards

=== No. 18 South Carolina State ===
No. 18 South Carolina State Bulldogs (3–0) at Furman Paladins (2–1) – Game summary

Quarter	1	2	3	4	Total
No. 18 Bulldogs	14	3	0	3	20
Paladins	0	3	3	11	17

at Paladin Stadium • Greenville, South Carolina

- Date: September 19
- Game time: 7:31 p.m.
- Game weather: Cloudy • Temperature: 76 °F (24 °C) • Wind: NE at 3 miles per hour (4.8 km/h)
- Game attendance: 9,217
- Referee: Bruce Austin
- TV: ESPN+
- Report: Official report

Game information

First quarter
Second quarter
Third quarter
Fourth quarter

Statistics	SCST	FUR
First downs	16	18
Plays–yards	68–332	74–317
Rushes–yards	36–124	34–53
Passing yards	208	264
Passing: comp–att–int	16–32–1	21–40–0
Turnovers		
Time of possession	31:57	28:03

Team	Category	Player	Statistics
South Carolina State	Passing	Keely Watson	12/25, 186 yards, TD, INT
South Carolina State	Rushing	Josh Shaw	9 carries, 55 yards, TD
South Carolina State	Receiving	DJ Maultsby	4 receptions, 118 yards, TD
Furman	Passing	Connor Ackerley	10/18, 164 yards, TD
Furman	Rushing	Ben Croasdale	8 carries, 24 yards
Furman	Receiving	Luke Shields	7 receptions, 133 yards, TD

=== at Richmond ===
Furman Paladins (2–2) at Richmond Spiders (3–1) – Game summary

Quarter	1	2	3	4	Total
Paladins	3	6	0	0	9
Spiders	3	7	3	0	13

at E. Claiborne Robins Stadium • Richmond, Victoria

- Date: September 26
- Game time: 2:00 p.m.
- Game weather: Sunny • Temperature: 70 °F (21 °C) • Wind: N at 13 miles per hour (21 km/h)
- Game attendance: 6,558
- Referee: Jay Johnson
- TV announcers (ESPN+): Robert Fish (play-by-play), Chris Anderson (analyst) and Chip Tarkenton (sideline)

Game information

First quarter

- (5:44) RICH - Kyle Bitsko 26-yard field goal (Drive: 8 Plays, 49 yards, 3:42; RICH 3–0)
- (0:00) FUR - Nathan Chapman 33-yard field goal (Drive: 7 Plays, 33 yards, 2:08; TIED 3–3)

Second quarter

- (9:22) RICH - Ashten Snelsire 6-yard pass to Carson Derey, Kyle Bitsko kick (Drive: 11 Plays, 75 yards, 5:38; RICH 10–3)
- (3:20) FUR - Nathan Chapman 42-yard field goal (Drive: 11 Plays, 50 yards, 4:30; RICH 10–6)
- (0:00) FUR - Nathan Chapman 49-yard field goal (Drive: 7 Plays, 35 yards, 0:36; RICH 10–9)

Third quarter

- (5:34) RICH - Kyle Bitsko 30-yard field goal (Drive: 6 Plays, 14 yards, 3:08; RICH 13–9)

Fourth quarter

- No scoring plays

Statistics	FUR	RICH
First downs	13	25
Plays–yards	61–215	78–355
Rushes–yards	31–78	38–188
Passing yards	137	167
Passing: Comp–Att–Int	15–30–0	19–40–3
Turnovers	2	4
Time of possession	23:03	36:57

Team	Category	Player	Statistics
Furman	Passing	Connor Ackerley	15/30, 137 yards
Furman	Rushing	Connor Ackerley	14 carries, 35 yards
Furman	Receiving	Luke Shields	4 receptions, 50 yards
Richmond	Passing	Ashten Snelsire	19/40, 167 yards, TD, 3 INT
Richmond	Rushing	Aziz Foster-Powell	25 carries, 125 yards
Richmond	Receiving	Andreas Hill	5 receptions, 38 yards

=== Wofford (rivalry) ===
Wofford Terriers (2–3) at Furman Paladins (2–3) – Game summary

Quarter	1	2	3	4	Total
Terriers	0	0	0	0	0
Paladins	0	0	0	0	0

at Paladin Stadium • Greenville, South Carolina

- Date: October 3
- Game time: 2:00 p.m.
- TV: ESPN+

Game information

First quarter
Second quarter
Third quarter
Fourth quarter

Statistics	WOF	FUR
First downs		
Plays–yards		
Rushes–yards		
Passing yards		
Passing: comp–att–int		
Turnovers		
Time of possession		

Team	Category	Player	Statistics
Wofford	Passing		
Wofford	Rushing		
Wofford	Receiving		
Furman	Passing		
Furman	Rushing		
Furman	Receiving		

=== at No. 15 Tennessee Tech ===
Furman Paladins (2–4) at No. 15 Tennessee Tech Golden Eagles (4–1) – Game summary

Quarter	1	2	3	4	Total
Paladins	0	3	5	7	15
No. 15 Golden Eagles	7	7	0	6	20

at Tucker Stadium • Cookeville, Tennessee

- Date: October 10
- Game time: 3:30 p.m.
- Game weather: Rain
- Game attendance: 3,260
- Referee: Jake Grombach
- TV announcers (ESPN+): Jacob Vinson (play-by-play) and Sam Brooks (analyst)

Game information

First quarter

- TNTC - Tre' Holloway 5-yard pass from Jax Leatherwood (Carter Brown kick), 11:43. Golden Eagles 7–0. Drive: 13 plays, 75 yards, 8:45.

Second quarter

- FUR - Nathan Chapman 31-yard field goal, 9:47. Golden Eagles 7–3. Drive: 11 plays, 67 yards, 5:12.
- TNTC - M.J. Flowers 1-yard run (Carter Brown kick), 0:31. Golden Eagles 14–3. Drive: 13 plays, 85 yards, 5:17.

Third quarter

- FUR - Connor Adams blocked punt for safety, 14:19. Golden Eagles 14–5. Drive: 3 plays, 0 yards, 1:41.
- FUR - Nathan Champan 53-yard field goal, 4:47. Golden Eagles 14–8. Drive: 13 plays, 49 yards, 5:53.

Fourth quarter

- TNTC - Carter Brown 52-yard field goal, 13:45. Golden Eagles 17–8. Drive: 6 plays, 17 yards, 2:30.
- FUR - Luke Shields 23-yard pass from Connor Ackerly (Nathan Chapman kick), 8:30. Golden Eagles 17–15. Drive: 6 plays, 51 yards, 1:42.
- TNTC - Carter Brown 52-yard field goal, 2:50. Golden Eagles 20–15. Drive: 9 plays, 39 yards, 3:52.

Statistics	FUR	TNTC
First downs	20	16
Plays–yards	72–289	60–285
Rushes–yards	33–67	24–73
Passing yards	222	212
Passing: comp–att–int	24–39–0	24–36–0
Turnovers	0	1
Time of possession	29:12	30:48

Team	Category	Player	Statistics
Furman	Passing	Connor Ackerly	24/39, 222 yards, TD
Furman	Rushing	Ben Croasdale	15 carries, 33 yards
Furman	Receiving	Luke Shields	7 receptions, 87 yards, TD
Tennessee Tech	Passing	Jax Leatherwood	24/36, 212 yards, TD
Tennessee Tech	Rushing	M. J. Flowers	15 carries, 70 yards, TD
Tennessee Tech	Receiving	Gabe Nunez	5 receptions, 60 yards

=== Samford ===
Samford Bulldogs (1–6) at Furman Paladins (2–5) – Game summary

Quarter	1	2	3	4	Total
Bulldogs	0	0	0	0	0
Paladins	0	0	0	0	0

at Paladin Stadium • Greenville, South Carolina

- Date: October 24
- Game time: 2:00 p.m.

Game information

First quarter
Second quarter
Third quarter
Fourth quarter

Statistics	SAM	FUR
First downs		
Plays–yards		
Rushes–yards		
Passing yards		
Passing: comp–att–int		
Turnovers		
Time of possession		

Team	Category	Player	Statistics
Samford	Passing		
Samford	Rushing		
Samford	Receiving		
Furman	Passing		
Furman	Rushing		
Furman	Receiving		

=== Western Carolina ===
Western Carolina Catamounts (3–5) at Furman Paladins (2–6) – Game summary

Quarter	1	2	3	4	Total
Catamounts	0	0	0	0	0
Paladins	0	0	0	0	0

at Paladin Stadium • Greenville, South Carolina

- Date: October 31
- Game time: 2:00 p.m.

Game information

First quarter
Second quarter
Third quarter
Fourth quarter

Statistics	WCU	FUR
First downs		
Plays–yards		
Rushes–yards		
Passing yards		
Passing: comp–att–int		
Turnovers		
Time of possession		

Team	Category	Player	Statistics
Western Carolina	Passing		
Western Carolina	Rushing		
Western Carolina	Receiving		
Furman	Passing		
Furman	Rushing		
Furman	Receiving		

=== at The Citadel (rivalry) ===
Furman Paladins (2–7) at The Citadel Bulldogs (2–7) – Game summary

Quarter	1	2	3	4	Total
Paladins	0	0	0	0	0
Bulldogs	0	0	0	0	0

at Johnson Hagood Stadium • Charleston, South Carolina

- Date: November 7
- Game time: 2:00 p.m.
- TV: ESPN+

Statistics	FUR	CIT
First downs		
Total yards		
Rushing yards		
Passing yards		
Passing: Comp–Att–Int		
Time of possession		

Team	Category	Player	Statistics
Furman	Passing		
Furman	Rushing		
Furman	Receiving		
The Citadel	Passing		
The Citadel	Rushing		
The Citadel	Receiving		

=== Chattanooga ===
Chattanooga Mocs (6–4) at Furman Paladins (3–7) – Game summary

Quarter	1	2	3	4	Total
Mocs	0	0	0	0	0
Paladins	0	0	0	0	0

at Paladin Stadium • Greenville, South Carolina

- Date: November 14
- Game time: 1:00 p.m.

Game information

First quarter
Second quarter
Third quarter
Fourth quarter

Statistics	UTC	FUR
First downs		
Plays–yards		
Rushes–yards		
Passing yards		
Passing: comp–att–int		
Turnovers		
Time of possession		

Team	Category	Player	Statistics
Chattanooga	Passing		
Chattanooga	Rushing		
Chattanooga	Receiving		
Furman	Passing		
Furman	Rushing		
Furman	Receiving		

=== at VMI ===
Furman Paladins (3–8) at VMI Keydets (0–11) – Game summary

Quarter	1	2	3	4	Total
Paladins	0	0	0	0	0
Keydets	0	0	0	0	0

at Alumni Memorial Field • Lexington, Virginia

- Date: November 21

Game information

First quarter
Second quarter
Third quarter
Fourth quarter

Statistics	FUR	VMI
First downs		
Plays–yards		
Rushes–yards		
Passing yards		
Passing: comp–att–int		
Turnovers		
Time of possession		

Team	Category	Player	Statistics
Furman	Passing		
Furman	Rushing		
Furman	Receiving		
VMI	Passing		
VMI	Rushing		
VMI	Receiving		

== Rankings ==
Ranking movements Legend: ██ Increase in ranking ██ Decrease in ranking — = Not ranked RV = Received votes
	Week														
Poll	Pre	1	2	3	4	5	6	7	8	9	10	11	12	13	Final
STATS	RV	—	—	RV	RV	—									
Coaches	RV	RV	RV	24	RV	RV									
