= 2026 The Citadel Bulldogs football team =

American college football season

2026 The Citadel Bulldogs football
- Conference: Southern Conference
- Record: 3–9 (1–7 SoCon)
- Head coach: Maurice Drayton (4th season)
- Offensive coordinator: Lamar Owens (3rd season)
- Offensive scheme: Spread option
- Defensive coordinator: Raleigh Jackson (4th season)
- Base defense: 4–3
- Home stadium: Johnson Hagood Stadium

2026 Southern Conference football standings
	Conf.			Overall
Team	W		L	W		L
No. 9 Mercer $^	7	–	1	10	–	2
No. 13 Tennessee Tech	6	–	2	9	–	3
Chattanooga	6	–	2	7	–	5
East Tennessee State	5	–	3	7	–	5
Western Carolina	5	–	3	7	–	5
Samford	4	–	4	4	–	7
Wofford	3	–	5	5	–	7
Furman	3	–	5	4	–	8
The Citadel	1	–	7	3	–	9
VMI	0	–	8	0	–	12
$ – Conference champion; ^ – FCS playoff participant; As of November 22, 2026; Rankings from STATS Poll

The 2026 The Citadel Bulldogs football team represented The Citadel as a member of the Southern Conference (SoCon) during the 2026 NCAA Division I FCS football season. The Bulldogs were led by fourth-year head coach Maurice Drayton and played their home games at Johnson Hagood Stadium in Charleston, South Carolina.

== Schedule ==
Date	Time	Opponent	Site	TV	Result	Attendance
August 29	6:00 p.m.	at Wofford	Gibbs Stadium; Spartanburg, SC (rivalry)	ESPN+	L 14–42	7,486
September 5	3:30 p.m.	at Charlotte*	Jerry Richardson Stadium; Charlotte, NC	ESPN+	W 43–41 ^{3OT}	13,274
September 12	6:00 p.m.	Charleston Southern*	Johnson Hagood Stadium; Charleston, SC (Lowcountry Boil Bowl)	ESPN+	L 20–26 ^{2OT}	9,875
September 26	2:00 p.m.	Chattanooga	Johnson Hagood Stadium; Charleston, SC	ESPN+	L 8–27	8,381
October 3	2:00 p.m.	at No. 15 South Carolina State*	Oliver C. Dawson Stadium; Orangeburg, SC	MEAC Network	W 34–31	11,250
October 10	2:00 p.m.	No. 24 East Tennessee State	Johnson Hagood Stadium; Charleston, SC	ESPN+	L 16–34	10,323
October 17	1:00 p.m.	at Texas A&M*	Kyle Field; College Station, TX	SECN+	L 0–41	101,052
October 24	2:00 p.m.	No. 12 Tennessee Tech	Johnson Hagood Stadium; Charleston, SC	ESPN+	L 13–28	8,527
October 31	3:00 p.m.	at No. 16 Mercer	Five Star Stadium; Macon, GA	ESPN+	L 19–28	5,338
November 7	2:00 p.m.	Furman^{†}	Johnson Hagood Stadium; Charleston, SC (rivalry)	ESPN+	L 14–24	12,711
November 14	12:30 p.m.	at VMI	Alumni Memorial Field; Lexington, VA (Military Classic of the South)	ESPN+	W 24–21 ^{2OT}	5,894
November 21	1:00 p.m.	at Western Carolina	E. J. Whitmire Stadium; Cullowhee, NC	ESPN+	L 23–38	10,001
*Non-conference game; ^{†}Homecoming; Rankings from STATS Poll released prior to the game; All times are in Eastern time

== Game summaries ==
=== at Wofford (rivalry) ===
The Citadel Bulldogs (0–0) at Wofford Terriers (0–0) – Game summary

Quarter	1	2	3	4	Total
Bulldogs	0	0	7	7	14
Terriers	7	14	14	7	42

at Gibbs Stadium • Spartanburg, South Carolina

- Date: August 29
- Game time: 6:00 p.m.
- Game weather: Sunny • Temperature: 84 °F (29 °C) • Wind: E at 4 miles per hour (6.4 km/h)
- Game attendance: 7,486
- Referee: Jeff Page
- TV announcers (ESPN+): Pete Yanity, Jay Sonnhalter and Dave Friedman

Game information

First quarter

- WOF – Gerald Modest Jr. 15-yard run (Sam Spence kick), 3:28. Terriers 7–0. Drive: 8 plays, 79 yards, 3:31.

Second quarter

- WOF – Davis Penn 33-yard blocked punt return (Sam Spence kick), 14:43. Terriers 14–0.
- WOF – Gerald Modest Jr. 5-yard run (Sam Spence kick), 0:19. Terriers 21–0. Drive: 5 plays, 32 yards, 0:47.

Third quarter

- CIT – Sebastien Boyle 4-yard run (Evan Kiely kick), 7:28. Terriers 21–7. Drive: 12 plays, 75 yards, 7:32.
- WOF – Ivory Aikens 5-yard pass from Kaeden Gilstrap (Sam Spence kick), 2:17. Terriers 28–7. Drive: 11 plays, 75 yards, 5:11.
- WOF – Colby Alexander 1-yard pass from J.T. Fayard (Sam Spence kick), 0:48. Terriers 35–7. Drive: 3 plays, 8 yards, 1:19.

Fourth quarter

- WOF – Colby Alexander 19-yard pass from J.T. Fayard (Sam Spence kick), 5:32. Terriers 42–7. Drive: 9 plays, 66 yards, 4:36.
- CIT – Sebastien Boyle 6-yard run (Evan Kiely kick), 1:49. Terriers 42–14. Drive: 10 plays, 80 yards, 3:38.

Statistics	CIT	WOF
First downs	21	24
Plays–yards	69–351	57–341
Rushes–yards	45–227	30–160
Passing yards	124	181
Passing: comp–att–int	15–24–1	19–27–2
Turnovers	3	2
Time of possession	35:05	24:55

Team	Category	Player	Statistics
The Citadel	Passing	Quentin Hayes	12/20, 88 yards, INT
The Citadel	Rushing	Quentin Hayes	18 carries, 91 yards
The Citadel	Receiving	Damir Abdullah	3 receptions, 32 yards
Wofford	Passing	J.T. Fayard	18/26, 176 yards, 2 TD, 2 INT
Wofford	Rushing	Gerald Modest Jr.	19 carries, 105 yards, 2 TD
Wofford	Receiving	Gerald Modest Jr.	4 receptions, 39 yards

=== at Charlotte (FBS) ===
The Citadel Bulldogs (0–1) at Charlotte 49ers (FBS) (0–0) – Game summary

Quarter	1	2	3	4	OT	2OT	3OT	Total
Bulldogs	7	0	14	7	7	6	2	43
49ers (FBS)	7	7	7	7	7	6	0	41

at Jerry Richardson Stadium • Charlotte, North Carolina

- Date: September 5
- Game time: 3:30 p.m.
- Game weather: Cloudy • Temperature: 96 °F (36 °C) • Wind: NW at 4 miles per hour (6.4 km/h)
- Game attendance: 13,274
- Referee: Tim Rich
- TV announcers (ESPN+): Tom Werme and Reggie Walker

Game information
First quarter
- CIT – Gavin Garcia 2-yard run (Evan Kiely kick), 7:23. Bulldogs 7–0. Drive: 5 plays, 48 yards, 2:20.
- CLT – Khamani Alexander 66-yard run (Ian Kelly kick), 6:03. Tied 7–7. Drive: 3 plays, 75 yards, 1:20.

Second quarter

- CLT – Derrick Eley 43-yard pass from Cole Gonzales (Ian Kelly kick), 5:47. 49ers 14–7. Drive: 4 plays, 72 yards, 2:00.

Third quarter

- CIT – Sebastian Boyle 56-yard run (Evan Kiely kick), 12:48. Tied 14–14. Drive: 4 plays, 75 yards, 2:12.
- CLT – Cole Gonzales 11-yard run (Ian Kelly kick), 7:38. 49ers 21–14. Drive: 8 plays, 62 yards, 5:07.
- CIT – Gavin Garcia 1-yard run (Evan Kiely kick), 1:32. Tied 21–21. Drive: 10 plays, 75 yards, 6:06.

Fourth quarter

- CIT – Nick Billoups 2-yard run (Evan Kiely kick), 12:11. Bulldogs 28–21. Drive: 6 plays, 35 yards, 3:08.
- CLT – Jaylen Hampton 6-yard pass from Cole Gonzales (Ian Kelly kick), 0:24. Tied 28–28. Drive: 14 plays, 72 yards, 3:10.

Overtime

- CIT – Gavin Garcia 25-yard run (Evan Kiely kick). Bulldogs 35–28. Drive: 2 plays, 25 yards.
- CLT – Cole Gonzales 8-yard run (Ian Kelly kick). Tied 35–35. Drive: 4 plays, 25 yards.

Second overtime

- CLT – Jaylen Hampton 18-yard pass from Cole Gonzales (pass failed). 49ers 41–35. Drive: 2 plays, 25 yards.
- CIT – Nick Billoups 2-yard run (run failed). Tied 41–41. Drive: 5 plays, 25 yards.

Third overtime

- CIT – Whit Hobgood two-point pass from Nick Billoups. Bulldogs 43–41.

Statistics	CIT	CLT
First downs	16	21
Plays–yards	63–400	74–538
Rushes–yards	50–268	33–216
Passing yards	132	322
Passing: comp–att–int	9–13–0	28–41–2
Turnovers	0	2
Time of possession	29:45	30:15

Team	Category	Player	Statistics
The Citadel	Passing	Nick Billoups	7/10, 91 yards
The Citadel	Rushing	Gavin Garcia	21 carries, 137 yards, 3 TD
The Citadel	Receiving	Ismael Zamor	3 receptions, 56 yards
Charlotte	Passing	Cole Gonzales	28/41, 322 yards, 3 TD, 2 INT
Charlotte	Rushing	Khamani Alexander	14 carries, 138 yards, TD
Charlotte	Receiving	Jaylen Hampton	8 receptions, 117 yards, 2 TD

=== Charleston Southern ===
Charleston Southern Buccaneers (0–2) at The Citadel Bulldogs (1–1) – Game summary

Quarter	1	2	3	4	OT	2OT	Total
Buccaneers	7	3	0	3	7	6	26
Bulldogs	7	0	3	3	7	0	20

at Johnson Hagood Stadium • Charleston, South Carolina

- Date: September 12
- Game time: 6:00 p.m.
- Game attendance: 9,875

Game information

First quarter

- CIT - Michael Lorino 33-yard pass from Quentin Hayes (Evan Kiely kick), 9:01. Bulldogs 7–0. Drive: 8 plays, 71 yards, 4:26.
- CHSO - Harry Smalls 1-yard run (Matt Rolader kick), 1:38. Tied 7–7. Drive: 5 plays, 19 yards, 2:30.

Second quarter

- CHSO - Matt Rolader 48-yard field goal, 10:27. Buccaneers 10–7. Drive: 8 plays, 35 yards.

Third quarter

- CIT - Evan Kiely 45-yard field goal, 8:53. Tied 10–10. Drive: 10 plays, 49 yards, 6:07.

Fourth quarter

- CIT - Evan Kiely 37-yard field goal, 14:16. Bulldogs 13–10. Drive: 13 plays, 57 yards, 7:29.
- CHSO - Matt Rolader 52-yard field goal, 6:14. Tied 13–13. Drive: 5 plays, 28 yards, 2:18.

Overtime

- CHSO - Dwayne Wright 2-yard run (Matt Rolader kick). Buccaneers 20–13. Drive: 3 plays, 25 yards.
- CIT - Gavin Garcia 2-yard run (Evan Kiely kick). Tied 20–20. Drive: 5 plays, 25 yards.

Second overtime

- CHSO - Hakeem Watters 9-yard run. Buccaneers 26–20. Drive: 3 plays, 25 yards.

Statistics	CHSO	CIT
First downs	14	17
Plays–yards	51–188	60–308
Rushes–yards	43–104	57–235
Passing yards	84	73
Passing: comp–att–int	8–16–0	3–14–1
Turnovers	1	1
Time of possession	25:50	34:10

Team	Category	Player	Statistics
Charleston Southern	Passing	Lek Powell	8/16, 84 yards
Charleston Southern	Rushing	Hakeem Waters	11 carries, 56 yards, TD
Charleston Southern	Receiving	Quay Kindell	2 receptions, 24 yards
The Citadel	Passing	Quentin Hayes	3/14, 73 yards, TD, INT
The Citadel	Rushing	Gavin Garcia	23 carries, 84 yards, TD
The Citadel	Receiving	Michael Lorino	1 reception, 33 yards, TD

=== Chattanooga ===
Chattanooga Mocs (2–2) at The Citadel Bulldogs (1–2) – Game summary

Quarter	1	2	3	4	Total
Mocs	0	0	0	0	0
Bulldogs	0	0	0	0	0

at Johnson Hagood Stadium • Charleston, South Carolina

- Date: September 26
- Game time: 2:00 p.m.
- TV: ESPN+

Game information

First quarter
Second quarter
Third quarter
Fourth quarter

Statistics	UTC	CIT
First downs		
Plays–yards		
Rushes–yards		
Passing yards		
Passing: comp–att–int		
Turnovers		
Time of possession		

Team	Category	Player	Statistics
Chattanooga	Passing		
Chattanooga	Rushing		
Chattanooga	Receiving		
The Citadel	Passing		
The Citadel	Rushing		
The Citadel	Receiving		

=== at No. 15 South Carolina State ===
The Citadel Bulldogs (1–3) at No. 15 South Carolina State Bulldogs (5–0) – Game summary

Quarter	1	2	3	4	Total
The Citadel	0	0	0	0	0
No. 15 South Carolina State	0	0	0	0	0

at Oliver C. Dawson Stadium • Orangeburg, South Carolina

- Date: October 3
- Game time: 2:00 p.m.
- TV: MEAC Network

Game information

First quarter
Second quarter
Third quarter
Fourth quarter

Statistics	CIT	SCST
First downs		
Plays–yards		
Rushes–yards		
Passing yards		
Passing: comp–att–int		
Turnovers		
Time of possession		

Team	Category	Player	Statistics
The Citadel	Passing		
The Citadel	Rushing		
The Citadel	Receiving		
South Carolina State	Passing		
South Carolina State	Rushing		
South Carolina State	Receiving		

=== No. 24 East Tennessee State ===
No. 24 East Tennessee State Buccaneers (4–2) at The Citadel Bulldogs (2–3) – Game summary

Quarter	1	2	3	4	Total
No. 24 Buccaneers	0	10	17	7	34
Bulldogs	10	0	0	6	16

at Johnson Hagood Stadium • Charleston, South Carolina

- Date: October 10
- Game time: 2:00 p.m.
- Game weather: Rain • Temperature: 78 °F (26 °C)
- Game attendance: 10,323
- Referee: Jason Graham
- TV announcers (ESPN+): Pete Yanity (play-by-play), Jay Sonnhalter (analyst), Dave Friedman (sideline reporter)

Game information

First quarter

- (6:31) CIT – Quentin Hayes 17-yard run, Evan Kiely kick (Drive: 13 plays, 84 yards, 8:29; Bulldogs 7–0)
- (0:55) CIT – Evan Kiely 29-yard field goal (Drive: 7 plays, 51 yards, 3:47; Bulldogs 10–0)

Second quarter

- (13:14) ETSU – CJ Gilmore 4-yard fumble recovery, Ewan Johnson kick (Bulldogs 10–7)
- (3:11) ETSU – Ewan Johnson 25-yard field goal (Drive: 11 plays, 44 yards, 5:06; Tied 10–10)

Third quarter

- (10:03) ETSU – Ewan Johnson 26-yard field goal (Drive: 10 plays, 66 yards, 4:57; Buccaneers 13–10)
- (9:03) ETSU – Josh Buckhalter 9-yard punt return, Ewan Johnson kick (Buccaneers 20–10)
- (3:05) ETSU – TJ Peyton 85-yard run, Ewan Johnson kick (Drive: 3 plays, 93 yards, 0:46; Buccaneers 27–10)

Fourth quarter

- (8:32) ETSU – Vashawn Nalls 1-yard pass from Mason Mims, Ewan Johnson kick (Drive: 11 plays, 57 yards, 5:44; Buccaneers 34–10)
- (3:55) CIT – Isaiah Jonson 15-yard pass from Xavier Hill (Drive: 4 plays, 23 yards, 2:10; Buccaneers 34–16)

Statistics	ETSU	CIT
First downs	14	13
Plays–yards	57–311	66–259
Rushes–yards	34–159	48–126
Passing yards	152	133
Passing: comp–att–int	15–23–0	7–18–0
Turnovers	2	2
Time of possession	25:40	34:20

Team	Category	Player	Statistics
East Tennessee State	Passing	Mason Mims	14/21, 154 yards, TD
East Tennessee State	Rushing	TJ Peyton	9 carries, 110 yards, TD
East Tennessee State	Receiving	Suderian Harrison	5 receptions, 91 yards
The Citadel	Passing	Xavier Hill	3/6, 81 yards, TD
The Citadel	Rushing	Gavin Garcia	19 carries, 70 yards
The Citadel	Receiving	Braylon Knauth	3 receptions, 73 yards

=== at Texas A&M (FBS) ===
The Citadel Bulldogs (2–4) at Texas A&M Aggies (3–3) – Game summary

Quarter	1	2	3	4	Total
Bulldogs	0	0	0	0	0
Aggies (FBS)	7	21	6	7	41

at Kyle Field • College Station, Texas

- Date: October 17
- Game time: 1:00 p.m.
- Game weather: Sunny • Temperature: 61 °F (16 °C) • Wind: NE 10 mph
- Game attendance: 101,052
- Referee: James Carter
- TV announcers (SECN+): Richard Cross and Charlie Strong

Statistics	CIT	TAMU
First downs	12	26
Plays–yards	57–183	65–501
Rushes–yards	47–140	40–264
Passing yards	43	237
Passing: comp–att–int	3–10–0	16–25–0
Turnovers	0	0
Time of possession	33:59	26:01

Team	Category	Player	Statistics
The Citadel	Passing	Nick Billoups	2/5, 38 yards
The Citadel	Rushing	Gavin Garcia	16 carries, 46 yards
The Citadel	Receiving	Isaiah Jonson	1 reception, 32 yards
Texas A&M	Passing	Marcel Reed	8/13, 130 yards, TD
Texas A&M	Rushing	KJ Edwards	13 carries, 116 yards
Texas A&M	Receiving	Aaron Gregory	6 receptions, 94 yards, 2 TD

=== No. 12 Tennessee Tech ===
No. 12 Tennessee Tech Golden Eagles (6–1) at The Citadel Bulldogs (2–5) – Game summary

Quarter	1	2	3	4	Total
No. 12 Golden Eagles	0	14	7	7	28
Bulldogs	3	7	0	3	13

at Johnson Hagood Stadium • Charleston, South Carolina

- Date: October 24
- Game time: 2:00 p.m.
- Game attendance: 8,527
- TV: ESPN+

Game information

First quarter

- CIT - Evan Kiely 53-yard field goal, 5:04. Bulldogs 3–0. Drive: 12 plays, 42 yards, 6:09.

Second quarter

- TNTC - Tre' Holloway 13-yard pass from Jax Leatherwood (Carter Brown kick), 14:54. Golden Eagles 7–3. Drive: 9 plays, 73 yards, 5:05.
- CIT - JJ Fludd 78-yard fumble return (Evan Kiely kick), 6:40. Bulldogs 10–7. Drive: 6 plays, 48 yards, 3:39.
- TNTC - Tre' Holloway 52-yard pass from Jax Leatherwood (Carter Brown kick), 5:06. Golden Eagles 14–10. Drive: 3 plays, 63 yards, 1:28.

Third quarter

- TNTC - M. J. Flowers 9-yard run (Carter Brown kick), 14:07. Golden Eagles 21–10. Drive: 1 play, 9 yards, 0:06.

Fourth quarter

- CIT - Evan Kiely 33-yard field goal, 5:33. Golden Eagles 21–13. Drive: 11 plays, 82 yards, 6:17.
- TNTC - M. J. Flowers 27-yard run (Carter Brown kick), 2:12. Golden Eagles 28–13. Drive: 7 plays, 73 yards, 3:15.

Statistics	TNTC	CIT
First downs	19	11
Plays–yards	54–387	51–190
Rushes–yards	29–147	39–181
Passing yards	240	9
Passing: comp–att–int	20–25–0	5–12–0
Turnovers	2	1
Time of possession	29:20	30:40

Team	Category	Player	Statistics
Tennessee Tech	Passing	Jax Leatherwood	20/25, 240 yards, 2 TD
Tennessee Tech	Rushing	M. J. Flowers	19 carries, 124 yards, 2 TD
Tennessee Tech	Receiving	Tre' Holloway	5 receptions, 128 yards, 2 TD
The Citadel	Passing	Nick Billoups	4/9, 8 yards
The Citadel	Rushing	Nick Billoups	10 carries, 74 yards
The Citadel	Receiving	Whit Hobgood	1 reception, 5 yards

=== at No. 16 Mercer ===
The Citadel Bulldogs (2–6) at No. 16 Mercer Bears (6–2) – Game summary

Quarter	1	2	3	4	Total
Bulldogs	0	0	0	0	0
No. 16 Bears	0	0	0	0	0

at Five Star Stadium • Macon, Georgia

- Date: October 31
- Game time: 3:00 p.m.

Game information

First quarter
Second quarter
Third quarter
Fourth quarter

Statistics	CIT	MER
First downs		
Plays–yards		
Rushes–yards		
Passing yards		
Passing: comp–att–int		
Turnovers		
Time of possession		

Team	Category	Player	Statistics
The Citadel	Passing		
The Citadel	Rushing		
The Citadel	Receiving		
Mercer	Passing		
Mercer	Rushing		
Mercer	Receiving		

=== Furman (rivalry) ===
Furman Paladins (2–7) at The Citadel Bulldogs (2–7) – Game summary

Quarter	1	2	3	4	Total
Paladins	0	0	0	0	0
Bulldogs	0	0	0	0	0

at Johnson Hagood Stadium • Charleston, South Carolina

- Date: November 7
- Game time: 2:00 p.m.
- TV: ESPN+

Statistics	FUR	CIT
First downs		
Total yards		
Rushing yards		
Passing yards		
Passing: Comp–Att–Int		
Time of possession		

Team	Category	Player	Statistics
Furman	Passing		
Furman	Rushing		
Furman	Receiving		
The Citadel	Passing		
The Citadel	Rushing		
The Citadel	Receiving		

=== at VMI (Military Classic of the South) ===
The Citadel Bulldogs (2–8) at VMI Keydets (0–10) – Game summary

Quarter	1	2	3	4	Total
Bulldogs	0	0	0	0	0
Keydets	0	0	0	0	0

at Alumni Memorial Field • Lexington, Virginia

- Date: November 14

Game information

First quarter
Second quarter
Third quarter
Fourth quarter

Statistics	CIT	VMI
First downs		
Plays–yards		
Rushes–yards		
Passing yards		
Passing: comp–att–int		
Turnovers		
Time of possession		

Team	Category	Player	Statistics
The Citadel	Passing		
The Citadel	Rushing		
The Citadel	Receiving		
VMI	Passing		
VMI	Rushing		
VMI	Receiving		

=== at Western Carolina ===
The Citadel Bulldogs (3–8) at Western Carolina Catamounts (6–5) – Game summary

Quarter	1	2	3	4	Total
Bulldogs	0	0	0	0	0
Catamounts	0	0	0	0	0

at E. J. Whitmire Stadium • Cullowhee, North Carolina

- Date: November 21
- Game time: 1:00 p.m.

Game information

First quarter
Second quarter
Third quarter
Fourth quarter

Statistics	CIT	WCU
First downs		
Plays–yards		
Rushes–yards		
Passing yards		
Passing: comp–att–int		
Turnovers		
Time of possession		

Team	Category	Player	Statistics
The Citadel	Passing		
The Citadel	Rushing		
The Citadel	Receiving		
Western Carolina	Passing		
Western Carolina	Rushing		
Western Carolina	Receiving		
