= 2026 Eastern Illinois Panthers football team =

American college football season

2026 Eastern Illinois Panthers football
- Conference: Ohio Valley Conference
- Record: 4–8 (3–4 OVC)
- Head coach: Chris Wilkerson (5th season)
- Offensive coordinator: Kyle Derickson (3rd season)
- Defensive coordinator: Andrew Strobel (2nd season)
- Home stadium: O'Brien Field

2026 Ohio Valley Conference football standings
	Conf.			Overall
Team	W		L	W		L
Western Illinois $^	6	–	1	8	–	4
UT Martin	5	–	2	6	–	6
Southeast Missouri State	5	–	2	7	–	5
Lindenwood	4	–	3	5	–	6
Eastern Illinois	3	–	4	4	–	8
Tennessee State	2	–	5	4	–	8
Gardner–Webb	2	–	5	3	–	9
Charleston Southern	1	–	6	4	–	8
$ – Conference champion; ^ – FCS playoff participant; As of November 22, 2026; Rankings from STATS Poll

The 2026 Eastern Illinois Panthers football team represents Eastern Illinois University as a member of the Ohio Valley Conference (OVC) during the 2026 NCAA Division I FCS football season. The Panthers are led by fifth-year head coach Chris Wilkerson and play their home games at O'Brien Field in Charleston, Illinois.

== Schedule ==
Date	Time	Opponent	Site	TV	Result	Attendance
August 27	6:00 p.m.	at Murray State*	Roy Stewart Stadium; Murray, KY	ESPN+	W 28–14	5,671
September 3	7:00 p.m.	at Minnesota*	Huntington Bank Stadium; Minneapolis, MN	NBCSN/Peacock	L 7–59	41,048
September 12	6:00 p.m.	Indiana State*	O'Brien Field; Charleston, IL	ESPN+	L 35–42	6,971
September 19	2:00 p.m.	at No. 5 Illinois State*	Hancock Stadium; Normal, IL (Mid-America Classic)	ESPN+	L 13–49	11,589
September 26	6:00 p.m.	at No. 2 South Dakota State*	Dana J. Dykhouse Stadium; Brookings, SD	ESPN+	L 7–42	18,264
October 10	2:30 p.m.	at Gardner–Webb	Ernest W. Spangler Stadium; Boiling Springs, NC	ESPN+	W 21–7	1,517
October 17	2:00 p.m.	Lindenwood	O'Brien Field; Charleston, IL	ESPN+	L 13–20	1,645
October 24	2:00 p.m.	Southeast Missouri State^{†}	O'Brien Field; Charleston, IL	ESPN+	L 10–20	6,822
October 31	2:00 p.m.	at UT Martin	Graham Stadium; Martin, TN	ESPN+	W 45–16	5,168
November 7	2:00 p.m.	Western Illinois	O'Brien Field; Charleston, IL	ESPN+	L 23–44	3,609
November 14	2:30 p.m.	at Tennessee State	Nissan Stadium; Nashville, TN	ESPN+	L 12–13	1,244
November 21	12:00 p.m.	Charleston Southern	O'Brien Field; Charleston, IL	ESPN+	W 20–17 ^{OT}	1,410
*Non-conference game; ^{†}Homecoming; Rankings from STATS Poll released prior to the game; All times are in Central time

== Game summaries ==
=== at Murray State ===
Eastern Illinois Panthers (0–0) at Murray State Racers (0–0) – Game summary

Quarter	1	2	3	4	Total
Panthers	0	14	7	7	28
Racers	0	14	0	0	14

at Roy Stewart Stadium • Murray, Kentucky

- Date: August 27
- Game time: 6:00 p.m.
- Game weather: Sunny • Temperature: 85 °F (29 °C) • Wind: SE at 5 miles per hour (8.0 km/h)
- Game attendance: 5,671
- Referee: Gregory Gompf
- TV announcers (ESPN+): Rob Cross and Drayton Charlton-Perrin

Game information

First quarter

- No scoring plays.

Second quarter

- MUR – Jaxon Potter 13-yard pass from Collin Shannon (Tyler Dorn kick failed), 14:29. Racers 6–0. Drive: 2 plays, 40 yards, 0:23.
- EIU – Charles Kellom 10-yard run (Drew Schiller kick), 9:36. Panthers 7–6. Drive: 4 plays, 33 yards, 1:59.
- EIU – Charles Kellom 88-yard run (Drew Schiller kick), 0:58. Panthers 14–6. Drive: 1 play, 88 yards, 0:14.
- MUR – Trey Firestone 7-yard pass from Collin Shannon (Trey Firestone–Brooks Kleinpeter pass), 0:00. Tied 14–14. Drive: 9 plays, 73 yards, 0:53.

Third quarter

- EIU – Charles Kellom 2-yard run (Drew Schiller kick), 9:05. Panthers 21–14. Drive: 8 plays, 63 yards, 4:28.

Fourth quarter

- EIU – Landers Green 20-yard pass from Cole LaCrue (Drew Schiller kick), 8:25. Panthers 28–14. Drive: 8 plays, 76 yards, 4:38.

Statistics	EIU	MUR
First downs	20	18
Plays–yards	65–368	66–320
Rushes–yards	47–267	26–63
Passing yards	101	257
Passing: comp–att–int	11–18–0	26–40–2
Turnovers	0	2
Time of possession	33:11	26:49

Team	Category	Player	Statistics
Eastern Illinois	Passing	Cole LaCrue	11/18, 101 yards, TD
Eastern Illinois	Rushing	Charles Kellom	19 carries, 171 yards, 3 TD
Eastern Illinois	Receiving	Samuel Gonzalez	3 receptions, 50 yards
Murray State	Passing	Collin Shannon	26/40, 257 yards, 2 TD, 2 INT
Murray State	Rushing	Mykel Allen	10 carries, 54 yards
Murray State	Receiving	Tyrell Campbell	5 receptions, 66 yards

=== at Minnesota (FBS) ===
Eastern Illinois Panthers (1–0) at Minnesota Golden Gophers (FBS) (0–0) – Game summary

Quarter	1	2	3	4	Total
Panthers	0	7	0	0	7
Golden Gophers (FBS)	14	21	10	14	59

at Huntington Bank Stadium • Minneapolis, Minnesota

- Date: September 3
- Game time: 7:00 p.m.
- Game weather: Sunny • Temperature: 83 °F (28 °C) • Wind: SE 9 mph
- Game attendance: 41,048
- Referee: Kole Knueppel
- TV announcers (Peacock/NBCSN): Jason Benetti, Yogi Roth and Ashley ShahAhmadi

Game information

First quarter

- MINN – Darius Taylor 1-yard run (Daniel Jackson kick), 4:29. Golden Gophers 7–0. Drive: 9 plays, 51 yards, 5:46.
- MINN – Javon Tracy 87-yard punt return (Daniel Jackson kick), 2:14. Golden Gophers 14–0.

Second quarter

- MINN – Darius Taylor 27-yard run (Daniel Jackson kick), 14:20. Golden Gophers 21–0. Drive: 3 plays, 66 yards, 1:11.
- EIU – Tyren Buggs 8-yard pass from Cole LaCrue (Drew Schiller kick), 9:00. Golden Gophers 21–7. Drive: 11 plays, 75 yards, 5:20.
- MINN – Darius Taylor 3-yard run (Daniel Jackson kick), 3:15. Golden Gophers 28–7. Drive: 9 plays, 73 yards, 5:41.
- MINN – Pierce Walsh 1-yard pass from Drake Lindsey (Daniel Jackson kick), 0:06. Golden Gophers 35–7. Drive: 10 plays, 53 yards, 1:37.

Third quarter

- MINN – Javon Tracy 69-yard punt return (Daniel Jackson kick), 13:26. Golden Gophers 42–7.
- MINN – Daniel Jackson 31-yard field goal, 3:17. Golden Gophers 45–7. Drive: 7 plays, 45 yards, 3:49.

Fourth quarter

- MINN – Max Shikenjanksi 2-yard run (Daniel Jackson kick), 12:29. Golden Gophers 52–7. Drive: 7 plays, 52 yards, 3:44.
- MINN – Xavier Ford 1-yard run (Beckham Sunderland kick), 0:25. Golden Gophers 59–7. Drive: 9 plays, 34 yards, 3:46.

Statistics	EIU	MINN
First downs	4	24
Plays–yards	43–110	71–495
Rushes–yards	28–51	38–147
Passing yards	59	348
Passing: comp–att–int	9–15–0	26–33–0
Turnovers	0	1
Time of possession	23:39	36:21

Team	Category	Player	Statistics
Eastern Illinois	Passing	Cole LaCrue	7/12, 51 yards, TD
Eastern Illinois	Rushing	Cole LaCrue	5 carries, 22 yards
Eastern Illinois	Receiving	Tyren Buggs	2 receptions, 38 yards, TD
Minnesota	Passing	Drake Lindsey	19/24, 264 yards, TD
Minnesota	Rushing	Darius Taylor	14 carries, 56 yards, 3 TD
Minnesota	Receiving	Javon Tracy	5 receptions, 98 yards

=== Indiana State ===
Indiana State Sycamores (0–2) at Eastern Illinois Panthers (1–1) – Game summary

Quarter	1	2	3	4	Total
Sycamores	14	14	7	7	42
Panthers	7	0	14	14	35

at O'Brien Field • Charleston, Illinois

- Date: September 12
- Game time: 6:00 p.m. CDT
- Game weather: Sunny • Temperature: 87 °F (31 °C) • Wind: NW 1 mph (1.6 km/h)
- Game attendance: 6,971
- Referee: Drew Myers
- TV: ESPN+
- Report: Official report

Game information

First quarter
Second quarter
Third quarter
Fourth quarter

Statistics	INST	EIU
First downs	26	20
Plays–yards	71–492	66–466
Rushes–yards	37–208	32–184
Passing yards	284	282
Passing: comp–att–int	21–34–1	20–34–0
Turnovers	1	1
Time of possession	29:56	30:04

Team	Category	Player	Statistics
Indiana State	Passing	Elijah Owens	21/33, 284 yards, 3 TD, INT
Indiana State	Rushing	Elijah Owens	17 carries, 98 yards, 2 TD
Indiana State	Receiving	BJ Wuest	6 receptions, 142 yards, TD
Eastern Illinois	Passing	Cole LaCrue	20/34, 282 yards, 3 TD
Eastern Illinois	Rushing	Charles Kellom	14 carries, 106 yards, TD
Eastern Illinois	Receiving	Samuel Gonzalez	4 receptions, 78 yards

=== at No. 5 Illinois State (Mid-America Classic) ===
Eastern Illinois Panthers (1–2) at No. 5 Illinois State Redbirds (3–0) – Game summary

Quarter	1	2	3	4	Total
Panthers	0	0	0	0	0
No. 5 Redbirds	0	0	0	0	0

at Hancock Stadium • Normal, Illinois

- Date: September 19
- Game time: 2:00 p.m.

Game information

First quarter
Second quarter
Third quarter
Fourth quarter

Statistics	EIU	ILST
First downs		
Plays–yards		
Rushes–yards		
Passing yards		
Passing: comp–att–int		
Turnovers		
Time of possession		

Team	Category	Player	Statistics
Eastern Illinois	Passing		
Eastern Illinois	Rushing		
Eastern Illinois	Receiving		
Illinois State	Passing		
Illinois State	Rushing		
Illinois State	Receiving		

=== at No. 2 South Dakota State ===
Eastern Illinois Panthers (1–3) at No. 2 South Dakota State Jackrabbits (3–1) – Game summary

Quarter	1	2	3	4	Total
Panthers	0	0	0	0	0
No. 2 Jackrabbits	0	0	0	0	0

at Dana J. Dykhouse Stadium • Brookings, South Dakota

- Date: September 26
- Game time: 6:00 p.m.
- TV: ESPN+

Game information

First quarter
Second quarter
Third quarter
Fourth quarter

Statistics	EIU	SDST
First downs		
Plays–yards		
Rushes–yards		
Passing yards		
Passing: comp–att–int		
Turnovers		
Time of possession		

Team	Category	Player	Statistics
Eastern Illinois	Passing		
Eastern Illinois	Rushing		
Eastern Illinois	Receiving		
South Dakota State	Passing		
South Dakota State	Rushing		
South Dakota State	Receiving		

=== at Gardner–Webb ===
Eastern Illinois Panthers (1–4) at Gardner–Webb Runnin' Bulldogs (2–4) – Game summary

Quarter	1	2	3	4	Total
Panthers	0	0	0	0	0
Runnin' Bulldogs	0	0	0	0	0

at Ernest W. Spangler Stadium • Boiling Springs, North Carolina

- Date: October 10
- Game time: 2:30 p.m.

Game information

First quarter
Second quarter
Third quarter
Fourth quarter

Statistics	EIU	GWEB
First downs		
Plays–yards		
Rushes–yards		
Passing yards		
Passing: comp–att–int		
Turnovers		
Time of possession		

Team	Category	Player	Statistics
Eastern Illinois	Passing		
Eastern Illinois	Rushing		
Eastern Illinois	Receiving		
Gardner–Webb	Passing		
Gardner–Webb	Rushing		
Gardner–Webb	Receiving		

=== Lindenwood ===
Lindenwood Lions (1–4) at Eastern Illinois Panthers (2–4) – Game summary

Quarter	1	2	3	4	Total
Lions	0	0	0	0	0
Panthers	0	0	0	0	0

at O'Brien Field • Charleston, Illinois

- Date: October 17
- Game time: 2:00 p.m.

Game information

First quarter
Second quarter
Third quarter
Fourth quarter

Statistics	LIN	EIU
First downs		
Plays–yards		
Rushes–yards		
Passing yards		
Passing: comp–att–int		
Turnovers		
Time of possession		

Team	Category	Player	Statistics
Lindenwood	Passing		
Lindenwood	Rushing		
Lindenwood	Receiving		
Eastern Illinois	Passing		
Eastern Illinois	Rushing		
Eastern Illinois	Receiving		

=== Southeast Missouri State ===
Southeast Missouri Redhawks (4–3) at Eastern Illinois Panthers (2–5) – Game summary

Quarter	1	2	3	4	Total
Redhawks	0	0	0	0	0
Panthers	0	0	0	0	0

at O'Brien Field • Charleston, Illinois

- Date: October 24
- Game time: 2:00 p.m.

Game information

First quarter
Second quarter
Third quarter
Fourth quarter

Statistics	SEMO	EIU
First downs		
Plays–yards		
Rushes–yards		
Passing yards		
Passing: comp–att–int		
Turnovers		
Time of possession		

Team	Category	Player	Statistics
Southeast Missouri State	Passing		
Southeast Missouri State	Rushing		
Southeast Missouri State	Receiving		
Eastern Illinois	Passing		
Eastern Illinois	Rushing		
Eastern Illinois	Receiving		

=== at UT Martin ===
Eastern Illinois Panthers (2–6) at UT Martin Skyhawks (3–5) – Game summary

Quarter	1	2	3	4	Total
Panthers	0	0	0	0	0
Skyhawks	0	0	0	0	0

at Graham Stadium • Martin, Tennessee

- Date: October 31
- Game time: 2:00 p.m.

Game information

First quarter
Second quarter
Third quarter
Fourth quarter

Statistics	EIU	UTM
First downs		
Plays–yards		
Rushes–yards		
Passing yards		
Passing: comp–att–int		
Turnovers		
Time of possession		

Team	Category	Player	Statistics
Eastern Illinois	Passing		
Eastern Illinois	Rushing		
Eastern Illinois	Receiving		
UT Martin	Passing		
UT Martin	Rushing		
UT Martin	Receiving		

=== Western Illinois ===
Western Illinois Leathernecks (5–4) at Eastern Illinois Panthers (3–6) – Game summary

Quarter	1	2	3	4	Total
Leathernecks	0	0	0	0	0
Panthers	0	0	0	0	0

at O'Brien Field • Charleston, Illinois

- Date: November 7
- Game time: 2:00 p.m.

Game information

First quarter
Second quarter
Third quarter
Fourth quarter

Statistics	WIU	EIU
First downs		
Plays–yards		
Rushes–yards		
Passing yards		
Passing: comp–att–int		
Turnovers		
Time of possession		

Team	Category	Player	Statistics
Western Illinois	Passing		
Western Illinois	Rushing		
Western Illinois	Receiving		
Eastern Illinois	Passing		
Eastern Illinois	Rushing		
Eastern Illinois	Receiving		

=== at Tennessee State ===
Eastern Illinois Panthers (3–7) at Tennessee State Tigers (2–8) – Game summary

Quarter	1	2	3	4	Total
Panthers	0	0	0	0	0
Tigers	0	0	0	0	0

at Nissan Stadium • Nashville, Tennessee

- Date: November 14
- Game time: 2:30 p.m.

Game information

First quarter
Second quarter
Third quarter
Fourth quarter

Statistics	EIU	TNST
First downs		
Plays–yards		
Rushes–yards		
Passing yards		
Passing: comp–att–int		
Turnovers		
Time of possession		

Team	Category	Player	Statistics
Eastern Illinois	Passing		
Eastern Illinois	Rushing		
Eastern Illinois	Receiving		
Tennessee State	Passing		
Tennessee State	Rushing		
Tennessee State	Receiving		

=== Charleston Southern ===
Charleston Southern Buccaneers (4–7) at Eastern Illinois Panthers (3–8) – Game summary

Quarter	1	2	3	4	Total
Buccaneers	0	0	0	0	0
Panthers	0	0	0	0	0

at O'Brien Field • Charleston, Illinois

- Date: November 21
- Game time: 12:00 p.m.

Game information

First quarter
Second quarter
Third quarter
Fourth quarter

Statistics	CHSO	EIU
First downs		
Plays–yards		
Rushes–yards		
Passing yards		
Passing: comp–att–int		
Turnovers		
Time of possession		

Team	Category	Player	Statistics
Charleston Southern	Passing		
Charleston Southern	Rushing		
Charleston Southern	Receiving		
Eastern Illinois	Passing		
Eastern Illinois	Rushing		
Eastern Illinois	Receiving		
