= 2026 UT Martin Skyhawks football team =

American college football season

2026 UT Martin Skyhawks football
- Conference: Ohio Valley Conference
- Record: 6–6 (5–2 OVC)
- Head coach: Jason Simpson (21st season)
- Offensive coordinator: Kevin Bannon (11th season)
- Co-offensive coordinator: Danny Modelski (1st (3rd overall) season)
- Defensive coordinator: Rudy Griffin (1st (3rd overall) season)
- Co-defensive coordinator: TJ Jefferson (1st (4th overall) season)
- Home stadium: Graham Stadium

2026 Ohio Valley Conference football standings
	Conf.			Overall
Team	W		L	W		L
Western Illinois $^	6	–	1	8	–	4
UT Martin	5	–	2	6	–	6
Southeast Missouri State	5	–	2	7	–	5
Lindenwood	4	–	3	5	–	6
Eastern Illinois	3	–	4	4	–	8
Tennessee State	2	–	5	4	–	8
Gardner–Webb	2	–	5	3	–	9
Charleston Southern	1	–	6	4	–	8
$ – Conference champion; ^ – FCS playoff participant; As of November 22, 2026; Rankings from STATS Poll

The 2026 UT Martin Skyhawks football team will represent the University of Tennessee at Martin as a member of the Ohio Valley Conference (OVC) during the 2026 NCAA Division I FCS football season. The Skyhawks will be led by twenty-first-year head coach Jason Simpson and will play their home games at Graham Stadium in Martin, Tennessee.

== Schedule ==
Date	Time	Opponent	Rank	Site	TV	Result	Attendance
August 27	6:30 p.m.	Central Arkansas*	No. 23	Graham Stadium; Martin, TN	ESPN+	L 24–36	5,516
September 5	6:00 p.m.	Chicago State*		Graham Stadium; Martin, TN	ESPN+	W 42–7	3,532
September 12	12:00 p.m.	at West Virginia*		Milan Puskar Stadium; Morgantown, WV	ESPN+	L 7–52	47,049
September 19	6:00 p.m.	at Memphis*		Simmons Bank Liberty Stadium; Memphis, TN	ESPN+	L 21–45	30,840
September 26	1:00 p.m.	at No. 13 Austin Peay*		Fortera Stadium; Clarksville, TN (Sgt. York Trophy)	ESPN+	L 12–35	7,981
October 10	2:30 p.m.	at Tennessee State		Nissan Stadium; Nashville, TN (Sgt. York Trophy)	ESPN+	W 42–28	670
October 17	2:00 p.m.	Gardner–Webb		Graham Stadium; Martin, TN	ESPN+	W 17–6	4,077
October 24	3:00 p.m.	at Western Illinois		Hanson Field; Macomb, IL	ESPN+	L 24–55	3,243
October 31	2:00 p.m.	Eastern Illinois^{†}		Graham Stadium; Martin, TN	ESPN+	L 16–45	5,168
November 7	1:00 p.m.	at Charleston Southern		Buccaneer Field; North Charleston, SC	ESPN+	W 20–10	2,201
November 14	2:00 p.m.	Lindenwood		Graham Stadium; Martin, TN	ESPN+	W 38–31	2,527
November 21	1:00 p.m.	at Southeast Missouri State		Houck Stadium; Cape Girardeau, MO	ESPN+	W 51–47	3,010
*Non-conference game; ^{†}Homecoming; Rankings from STATS Poll released prior to the game; All times are in Central time

== Game summaries ==
=== Central Arkansas ===
Central Arkansas Bears (0–0) at No. 23 UT Martin Skyhawks (0–0) – Game summary

Quarter	1	2	3	4	Total
Bears	6	13	7	10	36
No. 23 Skyhawks	7	10	0	7	24

at Graham Stadium • Martin, Tennessee

- Date: August 27
- Game time: 6:30 p.m.
- Game weather: Sunny • Temperature: 84 °F (29 °C) • Wind: N at 7 miles per hour (11 km/h)
- Game attendance: 5,516
- Referee: Michael Lennie
- TV announcers (ESPN+): Davis Gregory and Chris Brinkley

Game information

First quarter

- UTM – Trey Cotton 55-yard interception return (Brandon Sims kick), 8:05. Skyhawks 7–0.
- CARK – Kealen Juniel 8-yard pass from Donovyn Omolo (Caleb Jones PAT failed), 5:42. Skyhawks 7–6. Drive: 6 plays, 81 yards, 2:18.

Second quarter

- UTM – Brandon Sims 25-yard field goal, 13:47. Skyhawks 10–6. Drive: 13 plays, 59 yards, 6:48.
- CARK – Que Tillman 3-yard run (Caleb Jones kick), 6:53. Bears 13–10. Drive: 15 plays, 75 yards, 6:54.
- UTM – Tommy Ansley 7-yard run (Brandon Sims kick), 1:56. Skyhawks 17–13. Drive: 10 plays, 75 yards, 4:57.
- CARK – Arlie Lee 19-yard pass from Donovyn Omolo (Caleb Jones PAT blocked), 0:27. Bears 19–17. Drive: 8 plays, 75 yards, 1:29.

Third quarter

- CARK – Arlie Lee 51-yard pass from Donovyn Omolo (Caleb Jones kick), 12:04. Bears 26–17. Drive: 6 plays, 75 yards, 2:56.

Fourth quarter

- CARK – Caleb Jones 32-yard field goal, 12:52. Bears 29–17. Drive: 14 plays, 66 yards, 6:28.
- UTM – Tommy Ansley 24-yard run (Brandon Sims kick), 9:49. Bears 29–24. Drive: 7 plays, 75 yards, 3:03.
- UCA – Jalen Washington 27-yard run (Caleb Jones kick), 3:38. Bears 36–24. Drive: 13 plays, 75 yards, 6:11.

Statistics	CARK	UTM
First downs	23	16
Plays–yards	72–471	57–296
Rushes–yards	45–228	33–149
Passing yards	243	147
Passing: comp–att–int	20–27–1	13–24–2
Turnovers	1	2
Time of possession	30:18	29:42

Team	Category	Player	Statistics
Central Arkansas	Passing	Donovyn Omolo	20/27, 243 yards, 3 TD, INT
Central Arkansas	Rushing	Donovyn Omolo	12 carries, 118 yards
Central Arkansas	Receiving	Arlie Lee	2 receptions, 70 yards, 2 TD
UT Martin	Passing	Julian Calvez	13/24, 147 yards, 2 INT
UT Martin	Rushing	Tommy Ansley	10 carries, 61 yards, 2 TD
UT Martin	Receiving	Kaleb Washington	3 receptions, 53 yards

=== Chicago State ===
Chicago State Cougars (0–1) at UT Martin Skyhawks (0–1) – Game summary

Quarter	1	2	3	4	Total
Cougars	7	0	0	0	7
Skyhawks	0	21	0	21	42

at Graham Stadium • Martin, Tennessee

- Date: September 5
- Game time: 6:00 p.m.
- Game weather: Sunny • Temperature: 96 °F (36 °C) • Wind: NE at 2 miles per hour (3.2 km/h)
- Game attendance: 3,532
- Referee: Branden McCain
- TV: ESPN+

Game information

First quarter

- CHST – DeArmond Mathews 6-yard pass from Ashton Pannell (Donovan Blair kick), 7:17. Cougars 7–0. Drive: 10 plays, 57 yards, 6:10.

Second quarter

- UTM – Chris Franklin 4-yard run (Brandon Sims kick), 14:29. Tied 7–7. Drive: 13 plays, 75 yards, 7:48.
- UTM – Tommy Ansley 20-yard run (Brandon Sims kick), 6:31. Skyhawks 14–7. Drive: 12 plays, 76 yards, 5:33.
- UTM – Chris Franklin 1-yard run (Brandon Sims kick), 0:30. Skyhawks 21–7. Drive: 7 plays, 38 yards, 2:36.

Third quarter

- No scoring plays.

Fourth quarter

- UTM – Tommy Ansley 28-yard run (Brandon Sims kick), 14:54. Skyhawks 28–7. Drive: 3 plays, 65 yards, 0:57.
- UTM – Tommy Ansley 1-yard run (Brandon Sims kick), 6:08. Skyhawks 35–7. Drive: 7 plays, 74 yards, 3:39.
- UTM – Jaydon Peete 4-yard run (Brandon Sims kick), 1:01. Skyhawks 42–7. Drive: 6 plays, 68 yards, 2:47.

Statistics	CHST	UTM
First downs	9	25
Plays–yards	60–191	64–477
Rushes–yards	27–38	38–216
Passing yards	153	261
Passing: comp–att–int	20–33–0	17–26–1
Turnovers	0	2
Time of possession	30:41	29:19

Team	Category	Player	Statistics
Chicago State	Passing	Ashton Pannell	20/33, 153 yards, TD
Chicago State	Rushing	Tre' Hartwell	6 carries, 19 yards
Chicago State	Receiving	Kymari Gray	4 receptions, 61 yards
UT Martin	Passing	Tate Surber	16/23, 222 yards, INT
UT Martin	Rushing	Tommy Ansley	16 carries, 106 yards, 3 TD
UT Martin	Receiving	Deuce Oliver	3 receptions, 73 yards

=== at West Virginia (FBS) ===
UT Martin Skyhawks (1–1) at West Virginia Mountaineers (FBS) (1–0) – Game summary

Quarter	1	2	3	4	Total
Skyhawks	0	0	0	7	7
Mountaineers (FBS)	21	7	17	7	52

at Milan Puskar Stadium • Morgantown, West Virginia

- Date: September 12
- Game time: 12:00 p.m.
- Game weather: 85 °F (29.4 °C) • sunny • wind: South 7mph
- Game attendance: 47,049
- Referee: Tutashinda Salaam
- TV announcers (ESPN+): Shawn Kenney and Jeff Woody

Game information

First quarter

- WVU – DJ Epps 53-yard pass from Michael Hawkins Jr. (Jack Cassidy kick), 12:08. Mountaineers 7–0. Drive: 3 plays, 53 yards, 0:59.
- WVU – Cam Cook 2-yard run (Jack Cassidy kick), 9:11. Mountaineers 14–0. Drive: 5 plays, 21 yards, 1:33.
- WVU – Michael Hawkins Jr. 71-yard run (Jack Cassidy kick), 5:27. Mountaineers 21–0. Drive: 4 plays, 95 yards, 1:24.

Second quarter

- WVU – Michael Hawkins Jr. 5-yard run (Jack Cassidy kick), 11:30. Mountaineers 28–0. Drive: 5 plays, 74 yards, 1:44.

Third quarter

- WVU – Ryan Ward 32-yard pass from Michael Hawkins Jr. (Jack Cassidy kick), 12:57. Mountaineers 35–0. Drive: 6 plays, 75 yards, 2:03.
- WVU – Amari Latimer 29-yard run (Jack Cassidy kick), 9:56. Mountaineers 42–0. Drive: 2 plays, 47 yards, 0:33.
- WVU – Jack Cassidy 35-yard field goal, 1:35. Mountaineers 45–0. Drive: 15 plays, 73 yards, 6:21.

Fourth quarter

- WVU – Kedrick Triplett 27-yard pass from Jyron Hughley (Nate Flower kick), 7:07. Mountaineers 52–0. Drive: 10 plays, 68 yards, 4:13.
- UTM – John Betts III 6-yard fumble return (Brandon Sims kick), 3:25. Mountaineers 52–7.

Statistics	UTM	WVU
First downs	18	23
Plays–yards	70–318	63–525
Rushes–yards	37–148	51–316
Passing yards	170	209
Passing: comp–att–int	22–33–1	8–12–0
Turnovers	2	1
Time of possession	34:44	25:16

Team	Category	Player	Statistics
UT Martin	Passing	Tate Surber	19/28, 137 yards, INT
UT Martin	Rushing	Chris Franklin	12 carries, 85 yards
UT Martin	Receiving	Kaleb Costner	3 receptions, 36 yards
West Virginia	Passing	Michael Hawkins Jr.	5/7, 155 yards, 2 TD
West Virginia	Rushing	Michael Hawkins Jr.	6 carries, 96 yards, 2 TD
West Virginia	Receiving	DJ Epps	2 receptions, 112 yards, TD

=== at Memphis (FBS) ===
UT Martin Skyhawks (1–2) at Memphis Tigers (FBS) (2–1) – Game summary

Quarter	1	2	3	4	Total
Skyhawks	0	7	0	14	21
Tigers (FBS)	10	14	7	14	45

at Simmons Bank Liberty Stadium • Memphis, Tennessee

- Date: September 19
- Game time: 6:00 p.m.
- Game weather: Sunny • Temperature: 96 °F (36 °C) • Wind: SW at 4 miles per hour (6.4 km/h)
- Game attendance: 30,840
- Referee: Justin Ackley
- TV announcers (ESPN+): Jeff Hem (play-by-play) and Doc Holliday (analyst)

Game information

First quarter
Second quarter
Third quarter
Fourth quarter

Statistics	UTM	MEM
First downs	14	28
Plays–yards	57–291	75–572
Rushes–yards	28–114	40–299
Passing yards	177	273
Passing: comp–att–int	17–29–0	28–35–1
Turnovers	0	1
Time of possession	28:46	31:14

Team	Category	Player	Statistics
UT Martin	Passing	Tate Surber	17/29, 177 yards, 2 TD
UT Martin	Rushing	Jaydon Peete	6 carries, 38 yards
UT Martin	Receiving	Deuce Oliver	4 receptions, 69 yards
Memphis	Passing	Marcus Stokes	26/32, 258 yards, 4 TD
Memphis	Rushing	Jordan Thompson	6 carries, 110 yards, TD
Memphis	Receiving	Jermane Hayes	8 receptions, 57 yards

=== at No. 13 Austin Peay ===
UT Martin Skyhawks (1–3) at No. 13 Austin Peay Governors (3–1) – Game summary

Quarter	1	2	3	4	Total
Skyhawks	0	0	0	0	0
No. 13 Governors	0	0	0	0	0

at Fortera Stadium • Clarksville, Tennessee

- Date: September 26
- Game time: 1:00 p.m.
- TV announcers (ESPN+): Barry Gresham (play-by-play) and Ethan Schmidt (analyst)

Game information

First quarter
Second quarter
Third quarter
Fourth quarter

Statistics	UTM	APSU
First downs		
Plays–yards		
Rushes–yards		
Passing yards		
Passing: comp–att–int		
Turnovers		
Time of possession		

Team	Category	Player	Statistics
UT Martin	Passing		
UT Martin	Rushing		
UT Martin	Receiving		
Austin Peay	Passing		
Austin Peay	Rushing		
Austin Peay	Receiving		

=== at Tennessee State (Sgt. York Trophy) ===
UT Martin Skyhawks (1–4) at Tennessee State Tigers (1–4) – Game summary

Quarter	1	2	3	4	Total
Skyhawks	0	0	0	0	0
Tigers	0	0	0	0	0

at Nissan Stadium • Nashville, Tennessee

- Date: October 10
- Game time: 2:30 p.m.

Game information

First quarter
Second quarter
Third quarter
Fourth quarter

Statistics	UTM	TNST
First downs		
Plays–yards		
Rushes–yards		
Passing yards		
Passing: comp–att–int		
Turnovers		
Time of possession		

Team	Category	Player	Statistics
UT Martin	Passing		
UT Martin	Rushing		
UT Martin	Receiving		
Tennessee State	Passing		
Tennessee State	Rushing		
Tennessee State	Receiving		

=== Gardner–Webb ===
Gardner–Webb Runnin' Bulldogs (2–5) at UT Martin Skyhawks (2–4) – Game summary

Quarter	1	2	3	4	Total
Runnin' Bulldogs	0	0	0	0	0
Skyhawks	0	0	0	0	0

at Graham Stadium • Martin, Tennessee

- Date: October 17
- Game time: 2:00 p.m.

Game information

First quarter
Second quarter
Third quarter
Fourth quarter

Statistics	GWEB	UTM
First downs		
Plays–yards		
Rushes–yards		
Passing yards		
Passing: comp–att–int		
Turnovers		
Time of possession		

Team	Category	Player	Statistics
Gardner–Webb	Passing		
Gardner–Webb	Rushing		
Gardner–Webb	Receiving		
UT Martin	Passing		
UT Martin	Rushing		
UT Martin	Receiving		

=== at Western Illinois ===
UT Martin Skyhawks (3–4) at Western Illinois Leathernecks (3–4) – Game summary

Quarter	1	2	3	4	Total
Skyhawks	0	0	0	0	0
Leathernecks	0	0	0	0	0

at Hanson Field • Macomb, Illinois

- Date: October 24
- Game time: 3:00 p.m.

Game information

First quarter
Second quarter
Third quarter
Fourth quarter

Statistics	UTM	WIU
First downs		
Plays–yards		
Rushes–yards		
Passing yards		
Passing: comp–att–int		
Turnovers		
Time of possession		

Team	Category	Player	Statistics
UT Martin	Passing		
UT Martin	Rushing		
UT Martin	Receiving		
Western Illinois	Passing		
Western Illinois	Rushing		
Western Illinois	Receiving		

=== Eastern Illinois ===
Eastern Illinois Panthers (2–6) at UT Martin Skyhawks (3–5) – Game summary

Quarter	1	2	3	4	Total
Panthers	0	0	0	0	0
Skyhawks	0	0	0	0	0

at Graham Stadium • Martin, Tennessee

- Date: October 31
- Game time: 2:00 p.m.

Game information

First quarter
Second quarter
Third quarter
Fourth quarter

Statistics	EIU	UTM
First downs		
Plays–yards		
Rushes–yards		
Passing yards		
Passing: comp–att–int		
Turnovers		
Time of possession		

Team	Category	Player	Statistics
Eastern Illinois	Passing		
Eastern Illinois	Rushing		
Eastern Illinois	Receiving		
UT Martin	Passing		
UT Martin	Rushing		
UT Martin	Receiving		

=== at Charleston Southern ===
UT Martin Skyhawks (3–6) at Charleston Southern Buccaneers (4–5) – Game summary

Quarter	1	2	3	4	Total
Skyhawks	14	0	0	6	20
Buccaneers	3	7	0	0	10

at Buccaneer Field • North Charleston, South Carolina

- Date: November 7
- Game time: 1:00 p.m.
- Game weather: Cloudy
- Game attendance: 2,201
- Referee: Andrew Ison
- TV: ESPN+

Game information

First quarter
Second quarter
Third quarter
Fourth quarter

Statistics	UTM	CHSO
First downs		
Plays–yards		
Rushes–yards		
Passing yards		
Passing: comp–att–int		
Turnovers		
Time of possession		

Team	Category	Player	Statistics
UT Martin	Passing		
UT Martin	Rushing		
UT Martin	Receiving		
Charleston Southern	Passing		
Charleston Southern	Rushing		
Charleston Southern	Receiving		

=== Lindenwood ===
Lindenwood Lions (5–4) at UT Martin Skyhawks (4–6) – Game summary

Quarter	1	2	3	4	Total
Lions	0	0	0	0	0
Skyhawks	0	0	0	0	0

at Graham Stadium • Martin, Tennessee

- Date: November 14
- Game time: 2:00 p.m.

Game information

First quarter
Second quarter
Third quarter
Fourth quarter

Statistics	LIN	UTM
First downs		
Plays–yards		
Rushes–yards		
Passing yards		
Passing: comp–att–int		
Turnovers		
Time of possession		

Team	Category	Player	Statistics
Lindenwood	Passing		
Lindenwood	Rushing		
Lindenwood	Receiving		
UT Martin	Passing		
UT Martin	Rushing		
UT Martin	Receiving		

=== at Southeast Missouri State ===
UT Martin Skyhawks (5–6) at Southeast Missouri State Redhawks (7–4) – Game summary

Quarter	1	2	3	4	Total
Skyhawks	0	0	0	0	0
Redhawks	0	0	0	0	0

at Houck Stadium • Cape Girardeau, Missouri

- Date: November 21
- Game time: 1:00 p.m.

Game information

First quarter
Second quarter
Third quarter
Fourth quarter

Statistics	UTM	SEMO
First downs		
Plays–yards		
Rushes–yards		
Passing yards		
Passing: comp–att–int		
Turnovers		
Time of possession		

Team	Category	Player	Statistics
UT Martin	Passing		
UT Martin	Rushing		
UT Martin	Receiving		
Southeast Missouri State	Passing		
Southeast Missouri State	Rushing		
Southeast Missouri State	Receiving		

== Rankings ==
Ranking movements Legend: ██ Increase in ranking ██ Decrease in ranking — = Not ranked RV = Received votes
	Week														
Poll	Pre	1	2	3	4	5	6	7	8	9	10	11	12	13	Final
STATS	23	RV	—	—											
Coaches	22	RV	RV	RV											
