= 2026 Lindenwood Lions football team =

American college football season

2026 Lindenwood Lions football
- Conference: Ohio Valley Conference
- Record: 5–6 (4–3 OVC)
- Head coach: Jed Stugart (9th season)
- Offensive coordinator: Dusty Hovorka (9th season)
- Defensive coordinator: Eric Inama (9th season)
- Home stadium: Harlen C. Hunter Stadium

2026 Ohio Valley Conference football standings
	Conf.			Overall
Team	W		L	W		L
Western Illinois $^	6	–	1	8	–	4
UT Martin	5	–	2	6	–	6
Southeast Missouri State	5	–	2	7	–	5
Lindenwood	4	–	3	5	–	6
Eastern Illinois	3	–	4	4	–	8
Tennessee State	2	–	5	4	–	8
Gardner–Webb	2	–	5	3	–	9
Charleston Southern	1	–	6	4	–	8
$ – Conference champion; ^ – FCS playoff participant; As of November 22, 2026; Rankings from STATS Poll

The 2026 Lindenwood Lions football team will represent Lindenwood University as a member of the Ohio Valley Conference (OVC) during the 2026 NCAA Division I FCS football season. The Lions will be led by ninth-year head coach Jed Stugart and will play their home games at Harlen C. Hunter Stadium in St. Charles, Missouri.

== Schedule ==
Date	Time	Opponent	Site	TV	Result	Attendance
August 27	6:00 p.m.	Charleston Southern	Harlen C. Hunter Stadium; St. Charles, MO	ESPN+	W 20–17	4,116
September 3	6:00 p.m.	at Stony Brook*	Kenneth P. LaValle Stadium; Stony Brook, NY	FloFootball	L 32–36	4,383
September 12	6:00 p.m.	at Missouri State*	Robert W. Plaster Stadium; Springfield, MO	ESPN+	L 14–48	12,138
September 26	12:00 p.m.	at Eastern Michigan*	Rynearson Stadium; Ypsilanti, MI	ESPN+	L 3–29	6,109
October 10	1:00 p.m.	Southeast Missouri State	Harlen C. Hunter Stadium; St. Charles, MO	ESPN+	L 27–38	5,008
October 17	2:00 p.m.	at Eastern Illinois	O'Brien Field; Charleston, IL	ESPN+	W 20–13	1,645
October 24	2:00 p.m.	Chicago State*^{†}	Harlen C. Hunter Stadium; St. Charles, MO	ESPN+	W 44–9	3,322
October 31	1:00 p.m.	Tennessee State	Harlen C. Hunter Stadium; St. Charles, MO	ESPN+	W 27–0	3,356
November 7	12:30 p.m.	at Gardner–Webb	Ernest W. Spangler Stadium; Boiling Springs, NC	ESPN+	W 34–21	4,034
November 14	2:00 p.m.	at UT Martin	Graham Stadium; Martin, TN	ESPN+	L 31–38	2,527
November 21	2:00 p.m.	Western Illinois	Harlen C. Hunter Stadium; St. Charles, MO	ESPN+	L 7–41	3,514
*Non-conference game; ^{†}Homecoming; All times are in Central time

== Game summaries ==
=== Charleston Southern ===
Charleston Southern Buccaneers (0–0) at Lindenwood Lions (0–0) – Game summary

Quarter	1	2	3	4	Total
Buccaneers	0	3	0	14	17
Lions	0	10	7	3	20

at Harlen C. Hunter Stadium • St. Charles, Missouri

- Date: August 27
- Game time: 6:00 p.m.
- Game weather: Sunny
- Game attendance: 4,116
- Referee: John Kellermeier
- TV announcers (ESPN+): Bob Ramsey and Zach Zook

Game information

First quarter

- No scoring plays.

Second quarter

- CHSO – Matt Rolader 50-yard field goal, 12:16. Buccaneers 3–0. Drive: 10 plays, 48 yards, 4:27.
- LIN – Will Graham 32-yard field goal, 5:45. Tied 3–3. Drive: 11 plays, 64 yards, 6:27.
- LIN – Isaac Edwards 85-yard interception return (Will Graham kick), 0:13. Lions 10–3.

Third quarter

- LIN – Pops Battle 22-yard run (Will Graham kick), 9:41. Lions 17–3. Drive: 8 plays, 64 yards, 3:14.

Fourth quarter

- CHSO – Mekhi Campbell 4-yard pass from Lek Powell (Matt Rolader kick), 14:55. Lions 17–10. Drive: 8 plays, 71 yards, 3:58.
- LIN – Will Graham 28-yard field goal, 5:36. Lions 20–10. Drive: 11 plays, 67 yards, 6:11.
- CHSO – Hunter Green 14-yard pass from Lek Powell (Matt Rolader kick), 2:03. Lions 20–17. Drive: 10 plays, 80 yards, 3:28.

Statistics	CHSO	LIN
First downs	19	16
Plays–yards	63–315	61–312
Rushes–yards	31–107	40–170
Passing yards	208	142
Passing: comp–att–int	18–32–1	14–21–0
Turnovers	2	0
Time of possession	27:31	32:29

Team	Category	Player	Statistics
Charleston Southern	Passing	Lek Powell	18/32, 208 yards, 2 TD, INT
Charleston Southern	Rushing	Dwayne Wright	11 carries, 58 yards
Charleston Southern	Receiving	KD Dorsey	3 receptions, 46 yards
Lindenwood	Passing	Pops Battle	14/21, 142 yards
Lindenwood	Rushing	Jared Rhodes	11 carries, 63 yards
Lindenwood	Receiving	Jalen Smith	3 receptions, 47 yards

=== at Stony Brook ===
Lindenwood Lions (1–0) at Stony Brook Seawolves (0–1) – Game summary

Quarter	1	2	3	4	Total
Lions	10	12	3	7	32
Seawolves	7	0	10	19	36

at Kenneth P. LaValle Stadium • Stony Brook, New York

- Date: September 3
- Game time: 6:00 p.m.
- Game weather: Cloudy • Temperature: 79 °F (26 °C) • Wind: SW at 8 miles per hour (13 km/h)
- Game attendance: 4,383
- Referee: Jay Johnson
- TV: FloSports

Game information

First quarter

- LIN – Will Graham 21-yard field goal, 10:14. Lions 3–0. Drive: 9 plays, 73 yards, 4:40.
- LIN – Pops Battle 24-yard run (Will Graham kick), 8:14. Lions 10–0. Drive: 2 plays, 24 yards, 0:33.
- STBK – Keiden Gutierrez 28-yard pass from Quinn Boyd (Michael Mannino kick), 5:25. Lions 10–7. Drive: 7 plays, 75 yards, 2:49.

Second quarter

- LIN – Pops Battle 26-yard run (Will Graham kick), 14:54. Lions 17–7. Drive: 10 plays, 82 yards, 5:26.
- LIN – Will Graham 50-yard field goal, 7:12. Lions 20–7. Drive: 9 plays, 33 yards, 3:45.
- LIN – Team safety, 5:02. Lions 22–7.

Third quarter

- STBK – Seth Sweitzer 29-yard pass from Quinn Boyd (Michael Mannino kick), 8:29. Lions 22–14. Drive: 7 plays, 82 yards, 2:10.
- LIN – Will Graham 38-yard field goal, 5:05. Lions 25–14. Drive: 9 plays, 52 yards, 3:21.
- STBK – Michael Mannino 33-yard field goal, 1:51. Lions 25–17. Drive: 8 plays, 29 yards, 3:05.

Fourth quarter

- STBK – CJ Hester 52-yard run (pass failed), 14:52. Lions 25–23. Drive: 3 plays, 59 yards, 0:33.
- LIN – Jared Rhodes 1-yard run (Will Graham kick), 12:47. Lions 32–23. Drive: 5 plays, 74 yards, 2:05.
- STBK – CJ Hester 5-yard run (Michael Mannino kick), 12:11. Lions 32–30. Drive: 2 plays, 60 yards, 0:26.
- STBK – Quinn Boyd 8-yard run (pass failed), 7:39. Seawolves 36–32. Drive: 8 plays, 71 yards, 3:28.

Statistics	LIN	STBK
First downs	22	22
Plays–yards	71–364	64–402
Rushes–yards	43–155	29–104
Passing yards	209	298
Passing: Comp–Att–Int	19–28–0	27–35–0
Turnovers	0	0
Time of possession	32:31	26:46

Team	Category	Player	Statistics
Lindenwood	Passing	Pops Battle	19/28, 209 yards
Lindenwood	Rushing	Jared Rhodes	16 carries, 59 yards, TD
Lindenwood	Receiving	Drew Krobath	5 receptions, 81 yards
Stony Brook	Passing	Quinn Boyd	27/35, 298 yards, 2 TD
Stony Brook	Rushing	CJ Hester	14 carries, 95 yards, 2 TD
Stony Brook	Receiving	Seth Sweitzer	12 receptions, 157 yards, TD

=== at Missouri State (FBS) ===
Lindenwood Lions (1–1) at Missouri State Bears (FBS) (0–1) – Game summary

Quarter	1	2	3	4	Total
Lions	0	0	7	7	14
Bears (FBS)	14	20	14	0	48

at Robert W. Plaster Stadium • Springfield, Missouri

- Date: September 12
- Game time: 6:00 p.m.
- Game weather: Sunny • Temperature: 86 °F (30 °C) • Wind: NW at 7 miles per hour (11 km/h)
- Game attendance: 12,138
- Referee: Jeremee Tate
- TV announcers (ESPN+): Dom West (play-by-play), Tom Mast (analyst) and Cierra Clark (sideline)

Game information

First quarter

- MOST – Isaiah Myers 24-yard run (Stewart McDonald kick), 10:39. Bears 7–0. Drive: 11 plays, 75 yards, 4:21.
- MOST – Connor Lair 1-yard run (Stewart McDonald kick), 0:07. Bears 14–0. Drive: 4 plays, 48 yards, 1:35.

Second quarter

- MOST – Ramone Green Jr. 1-yard run (Stewart McDonald kick), 11:21. Bears 21–0. Drive: 7 plays, 62 yards, 2:21.
- MOST – Isaiah Myers 72-yard pass from Skyler Locklear (Stewart McDonald kick failed), 10:01. Bears 27–0. Drive: 1 play, 72 yards, 0:10.
- MOST – Breezy Dubar 10-yard run (Stewart McDonald kick), 5:20. Bears 34–0. Drive: 7 plays, 72 yards, 3:13.

Third quarter

- MOST – Ramone Green Jr. 1-yard run (Stewart McDonald kick), 7:13. Bears 41–0. Drive: 10 plays, 69 yards, 4:21.
- LIN – Drew Krobath 15-yard pass from Pops Battle (Will Graham kick), 4:07. Bears 41–7. Drive: 8 plays, 65 yards, 3:06.
- MOST – Henry Belin IV 16-yard run (Stewart McDonald kick), 0:00. Bears 48–7. Drive: 3 plays, 68 yards, 0:37.

Fourth quarter

- LIN – Elijah Roy 32-yard pass from Pops Battle (Will Graham kick), 12:21. Bears 48–14. Drive: 6 plays, 75 yards, 2:41.

Statistics	LIN	MOST
First downs	11	27
Plays–yards	54–223	78–569
Rushes–yards	34–118	53–249
Passing yards	105	320
Passing: comp–att–int	8–20–1	21–25–0
Turnovers	2	0
Time of possession	25:50	34:10

Team	Category	Player	Statistics
Lindenwood	Passing	Pops Battle	8/20, 105 yards, 2 TD, INT
Lindenwood	Rushing	Pops Battle	14 carries, 63 yards
Lindenwood	Receiving	Elijah Roy	4 receptions, 72 yards, TD
Missouri State	Passing	Skyler Locklear	17/20, 258 yards, TD
Missouri State	Rushing	Ramone Green Jr.	12 carries, 80 yards, 2 TD
Missouri State	Receiving	Isaiah Myers	5 receptions, 155 yards, TD

=== at Eastern Michigan (FBS) ===
Lindenwood Lions (1–2) at Eastern Michigan Eagles (1–2) – Game summary

Quarter	1	2	3	4	Total
Lions	0	0	0	0	0
Eagles (FBS)	0	0	0	0	0

at Rynearson Stadium • Ypsilanti, Michigan

- Date: September 26
- Game time: 12:00 p.m.
- TV announcers (ESPN+): Evan Stockton and Randy Buffington

Game information

First quarter
Second quarter
Third quarter
Fourth quarter

Statistics	LIN	EMU
First downs		
Plays–yards		
Rushes–yards		
Passing yards		
Passing: comp–att–int		
Turnovers		
Time of possession		

Team	Category	Player	Statistics
Lindenwood	Passing		
Lindenwood	Rushing		
Lindenwood	Receiving		
Eastern Michigan	Passing		
Eastern Michigan	Rushing		
Eastern Michigan	Receiving		

=== Southeast Missouri State ===
Southeast Missouri State Redhawks (2–3) at Lindenwood Lions (1–3) – Game summary

Quarter	1	2	3	4	Total
Redhawks	0	0	0	0	0
Lions	0	0	0	0	0

at Harlen C. Hunter Stadium • St. Charles, Missouri

- Date: October 10
- Game time: 1:00 p.m.

Game information

First quarter
Second quarter
Third quarter
Fourth quarter

Statistics	SEMO	LIN
First downs		
Plays–yards		
Rushes–yards		
Passing yards		
Passing: comp–att–int		
Turnovers		
Time of possession		

Team	Category	Player	Statistics
Southeast Missouri State	Passing		
Southeast Missouri State	Rushing		
Southeast Missouri State	Receiving		
Lindenwood	Passing		
Lindenwood	Rushing		
Lindenwood	Receiving		

=== at Eastern Illinois ===
Lindenwood Lions (1–4) at Eastern Illinois Panthers (2–4) – Game summary

Quarter	1	2	3	4	Total
Lions	0	0	0	0	0
Panthers	0	0	0	0	0

at O'Brien Field • Charleston, Illinois

- Date: October 17
- Game time: 2:00 p.m.

Game information

First quarter
Second quarter
Third quarter
Fourth quarter

Statistics	LIN	EIU
First downs		
Plays–yards		
Rushes–yards		
Passing yards		
Passing: comp–att–int		
Turnovers		
Time of possession		

Team	Category	Player	Statistics
Lindenwood	Passing		
Lindenwood	Rushing		
Lindenwood	Receiving		
Eastern Illinois	Passing		
Eastern Illinois	Rushing		
Eastern Illinois	Receiving		

=== Chicago State ===
Chicago State Cougars (1–6) at Lindenwood Lions (2–4) – Game summary

Quarter	1	2	3	4	Total
Cougars	0	0	0	0	0
Lions	0	0	0	0	0

at Harlen C. Hunter Stadium • St. Charles, Missouri

- Date: October 24
- Game time: 2:00 p.m.

Game information

First quarter
Second quarter
Third quarter
Fourth quarter

Statistics	CHST	LIN
First downs		
Plays–yards		
Rushes–yards		
Passing yards		
Passing: comp–att–int		
Turnovers		
Time of possession		

Team	Category	Player	Statistics
Chicago State	Passing		
Chicago State	Rushing		
Chicago State	Receiving		
Lindenwood	Passing		
Lindenwood	Rushing		
Lindenwood	Receiving		

=== Tennessee State ===
Tennessee State Tigers (2–6) at Lindenwood Lions (3–4) – Game summary

Quarter	1	2	3	4	Total
Tigers	0	0	0	0	0
Lions	0	0	0	0	0

at Harlen C. Hunter Stadium • St. Charles, Missouri

- Date: October 31
- Game time: 1:00 p.m.

Game information

First quarter
Second quarter
Third quarter
Fourth quarter

Statistics	TNST	LIN
First downs		
Plays–yards		
Rushes–yards		
Passing yards		
Passing: comp–att–int		
Turnovers		
Time of possession		

Team	Category	Player	Statistics
Tennessee State	Passing		
Tennessee State	Rushing		
Tennessee State	Receiving		
Lindenwood	Passing		
Lindenwood	Rushing		
Lindenwood	Receiving		

=== at Gardner–Webb ===
Lindenwood Lions (4–4) at Gardner–Webb Runnin' Bulldogs (3–6) – Game summary

Quarter	1	2	3	4	Total
Lions	0	0	0	0	0
Runnin' Bulldogs	0	0	0	0	0

at Ernest W. Spangler Stadium • Boiling Springs, North Carolina

- Date: November 7
- Game time: 12:30 p.m.

Game information

First quarter
Second quarter
Third quarter
Fourth quarter

Statistics	LIN	GWEB
First downs		
Plays–yards		
Rushes–yards		
Passing yards		
Passing: comp–att–int		
Turnovers		
Time of possession		

Team	Category	Player	Statistics
Lindenwood	Passing		
Lindenwood	Rushing		
Lindenwood	Receiving		
Gardner–Webb	Passing		
Gardner–Webb	Rushing		
Gardner–Webb	Receiving		

=== at UT Martin ===
Lindenwood Lions (5–4) at UT Martin Skyhawks (4–6) – Game summary

Quarter	1	2	3	4	Total
Lions	0	0	0	0	0
Skyhawks	0	0	0	0	0

at Graham Stadium • Martin, Tennessee

- Date: November 14
- Game time: 2:00 p.m.

Game information

First quarter
Second quarter
Third quarter
Fourth quarter

Statistics	LIN	UTM
First downs		
Plays–yards		
Rushes–yards		
Passing yards		
Passing: comp–att–int		
Turnovers		
Time of possession		

Team	Category	Player	Statistics
Lindenwood	Passing		
Lindenwood	Rushing		
Lindenwood	Receiving		
UT Martin	Passing		
UT Martin	Rushing		
UT Martin	Receiving		

=== Western Illinois ===
Western Illinois Leathernecks (7–4) at Lindenwood Lions (5–5) – Game summary

Quarter	1	2	3	4	Total
Leathernecks	0	0	0	0	0
Lions	0	0	0	0	0

at Harlen C. Hunter Stadium • St. Charles, Missouri

- Date: November 21
- Game time: 2:00 p.m.

Game information

First quarter
Second quarter
Third quarter
Fourth quarter

Statistics	WIU	LIN
First downs		
Plays–yards		
Rushes–yards		
Passing yards		
Passing: comp–att–int		
Turnovers		
Time of possession		

Team	Category	Player	Statistics
Western Illinois	Passing		
Western Illinois	Rushing		
Western Illinois	Receiving		
Lindenwood	Passing		
Lindenwood	Rushing		
Lindenwood	Receiving		
