= 2026 Gardner–Webb Runnin' Bulldogs football team =

American college football season

2026 Gardner–Webb Runnin' Bulldogs football
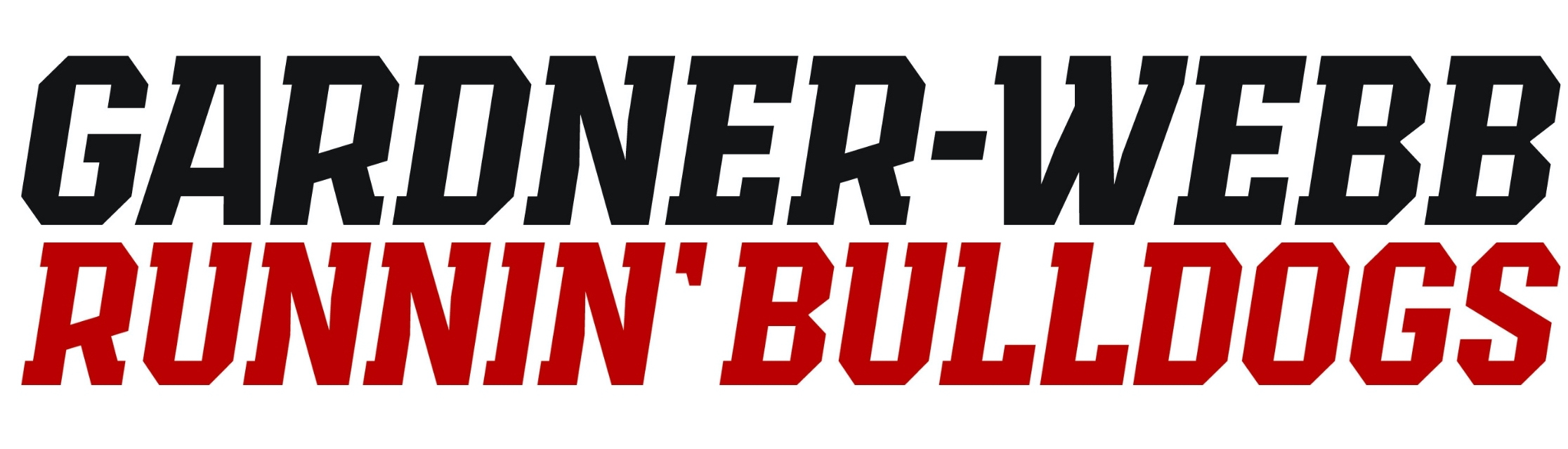
- Conference: Ohio Valley Conference
- Record: 3–9 (2–5 OVC)
- Head coach: Kris McCullough (1st season; game one); Pete Bennett (interim; remainder of season)
- Offensive coordinator: Kenny Hrncir (1st season)
- Co-offensive coordinator: Brayle Brown (1st season)
- Offensive scheme: Hurry-up, no-huddle spread
- Defensive coordinator: Jake Shaw (1st season)
- Base defense: 4–2–5
- Home stadium: Ernest W. Spangler Stadium

2026 Ohio Valley Conference football standings
	Conf.			Overall
Team	W		L	W		L
Western Illinois $^	6	–	1	8	–	4
UT Martin	5	–	2	6	–	6
Southeast Missouri State	5	–	2	7	–	5
Lindenwood	4	–	3	5	–	6
Eastern Illinois	3	–	4	4	–	8
Tennessee State	2	–	5	4	–	8
Gardner–Webb	2	–	5	3	–	9
Charleston Southern	1	–	6	4	–	8
$ – Conference champion; ^ – FCS playoff participant; As of November 22, 2026; Rankings from STATS Poll

The 2026 Gardner–Webb Runnin' Bulldogs football team represents Gardner–Webb University as a member of the Ohio Valley Conference (OVC) during the 2026 NCAA Division I FCS football season. The team plays their home games at Ernest W. Spangler Stadium in Boiling Springs, North Carolina.

The Runnin' Bulldogs were led by first-year head coach Kris McCullough, during their first game, after which McCullough was fired following a university investigation. Special teams coordinator Pete Bennett was named interim head coach.

== Schedule ==
Date	Time	Opponent	Site	TV	Result	Attendance
August 27	7:00 p.m.	at No. 17 Austin Peay*	Fortera Stadium; Clarksville, TN	ESPN+	L 17–35	7,043
September 5	1:30 p.m.	at Wofford*	Gibbs Stadium; Spartanburg, SC	ESPN+	L 13–17	3,527
September 12	6:00 p.m.	at Liberty*	Williams Stadium; Lynchburg, VA	ESPN+	L 23–24	15,708
September 19	6:00 p.m.	North Carolina Central*	Ernest W. Spangler Stadium; Boiling Springs, NC	ESPN+	W 44–20	5,144
September 26	3:30 p.m.	at Marshall*	Joan C. Edwards Stadium; Huntington, WV	ESPN+	L 35–36	25,710
October 3	6:00 p.m.	at Charleston Southern	Buccaneer Field; North Charleston, SC	ESPN+	W 12–10	2,071
October 10	3:30 p.m.	Eastern Illinois	Ernest W. Spangler Stadium; Boiling Springs, NC	ESPN+	L 7–21	1,517
October 17	3:00 p.m.	at UT Martin	Graham Stadium; Martin, TN	ESPN+	L 6–17	4,077
October 31	2:00 p.m.	at Southeast Missouri State	Houck Stadium; Cape Girardeau, MO	ESPN+	W 34–10	2,134
November 7	1:30 p.m.	Lindenwood^{†}	Ernest W. Spangler Stadium; Boiling Springs, NC	ESPN+	L 21–34	4,034
November 14	2:00 p.m.	at Western Illinois	Hanson Field; Macomb, IL	ESPN+	L 7–45	2,379
November 21	1:30 p.m.	Tennessee State	Ernest W. Spangler Stadium; Boiling Springs, NC	ESPN+	L 12–16	3,325
*Non-conference game; ^{†}Homecoming; Rankings from STATS Poll released prior to the game; All times are in Eastern time

== Game summaries ==
=== at No. 17 Austin Peay ===
Gardner–Webb Runnin' Bulldogs (0–0) at No. 17 Austin Peay Governors (0–0) – Game summary

Quarter	1	2	3	4	Total
Runnin' Bulldogs	3	7	0	7	17
No. 17 Governors	7	14	14	0	35

at Fortera Stadium • Clarksville, Tennessee

- Date: August 27
- Game time: 7:00 p.m.
- Game weather: Sunny • Temperature: 87 °F (31 °C) • Wind: E 6 mph
- Game attendance: 7,043
- Referee: Gabriel Tomlin
- TV announcers (ESPN+): Barry Gresham and Ethan Schmidt

Game information

First quarter

- GWEB – Tyler Simpson 36-yard field goal, 4:17. Runnin' Bulldogs 3–0. Drive: 16 plays, 73 yards, 6:08.
- APSU – Courtland Simmons 1-yard run (Nick Guagliano kick), 1:12. Governors 7–3. Drive: 7 plays, 79 yards, 2:58.

Second quarter

- GWEB – Jalile Bost 43-yard pass from Cole Pennington (Tyler Simpson kick), 14:12. Runnin' Bulldogs 10–7. Drive: 2 plays, 47 yards, 0:43.
- APSU – Isaiah Groves 1-yard run (Nick Guagliano kick), 7:08. Governors 14–10. Drive: 10 plays, 79 yards, 6:15.
- APSU – Denver Harper 49-yard pass from Chris Parson (Nick Guagliano kick), 4:34. Governors 21–10. Drive: 3 plays, 62 yards, 1:12.

Third quarter

- APSU – Chris Parson 4-yard run (Nick Guagliano kick), 8:03. Governors 28–10. Drive: 5 plays, 62 yards, 1:51.
- APSU – Courtland Simmons 19-yard run (Nick Guagliano kick), 1:58. Governors 35–10. Drive: 3 plays, 48 yards, 1:19.

Fourth quarter

- GWEB – Adrian Cormier 1-yard run (Andrew Bontekoe kick), 13:30. Governors 35–17. Drive: 11 plays, 75 yards, 3:28.

Statistics	GWEB	APSU
First downs	22	22
Plays–yards	69–344	68–483
Rushes–yards	20–32	47–175
Passing yards	312	308
Passing: comp–att–int	27–49–1	14–21–1
Turnovers	1	1
Time of possession	23:21	36:39

Team	Category	Player	Statistics
Gardner–Webb	Passing	Cole Pennington	27/49, 312 yards, TD, INT
Gardner–Webb	Rushing	Christian Vann	4 carries, 15 yards
Gardner–Webb	Receiving	Kory Jones	9 receptions, 102 yards
Austin Peay	Passing	Chris Parson	14/21, 308 yards, TD, INT
Austin Peay	Rushing	Courtland Simmons	11 carries, 73 yards, 2 TD
Austin Peay	Receiving	Denver Harper	3 receptions, 108 yards, TD

=== at Wofford ===
Gardner–Webb Runnin' Bulldogs (0–1) at Wofford Terriers (1–0) – Game summary

Quarter	1	2	3	4	Total
Runnin' Bulldogs	3	0	7	3	13
Terriers	7	7	0	3	17

at Gibbs Stadium • Spartanburg, South Carolina

- Date: September 5
- Game time: 1:30 p.m.
- Game weather: Sunny • Temperature: 99 °F (37 °C) • Wind: N 2 MPH
- Game attendance: 3,527
- Referee: Todd Boyd
- TV: ESPN+

Game information
First quarter
- WOF – Ivory Aikens 97-yard kickoff return (Sam Spence kick), 14:49. Terriers 7–0.
- GWEB – Andrew Bontekoe 25-yard field goal, 1:20. Terriers 7–3. Drive: 12 plays, 56 yards, 5:05.

Second quarter

- WOF – Gerald Modest Jr. 9-yard run (Sam Spence kick), 2:37. Terriers 14–3. Drive: 10 plays, 79 yards, 3:46.

Third quarter

- GWEB – Randy Young 6-yard run (Tyler Simpson kick), 4:47. Terriers 14–10. Drive: 13 plays, 62 yards, 5:04.

Fourth quarter

- WOF – Sam Spence 32-yard field goal, 11:07. Terriers 17–10. Drive: 6 plays, 36 yards, 3:09.
- GWEB – Tyler Simpson 33-yard field goal, 5:37. Terriers 17–13. Drive: 7 plays, 82 yards, 2:53.

Statistics	GWEB	WOF
First downs	24	12
Plays–yards	82–438	55–208
Rushes–yards	28–60	33–88
Passing yards	378	120
Passing: comp–att–int	31–54–1	11–22–1
Turnovers	3	2
Time of possession	33:51	26:09

Team	Category	Player	Statistics
Gardner–Webb	Passing	Cole Pennington	31/54, 378 yards, INT
Gardner–Webb	Rushing	Adrian Cormier	8 carries, 32 yards
Gardner–Webb	Receiving	Kory Jones	6 receptions, 135 yards
Wofford	Passing	J. T. Fayard	11/22, 120 yards, INT
Wofford	Rushing	Gerald Modest Jr.	20 carries, 85 yards, TD
Wofford	Receiving	Colby Alexander	1 reception, 35 yards

=== at Liberty (FBS) ===
Gardner–Webb Runnin' Bulldogs (0–2) at Liberty Flames (FBS) (0–1) – Game summary

Quarter	1	2	3	4	Total
Runnin' Bulldogs	6	14	3	0	23
Flames (FBS)	14	3	0	7	24

at Williams Stadium • Lynchburg, Virginia

- Date: September 12
- Game time: 6:00 p.m.
- Game weather: Cloudy • Temperature: 76 °F (24 °C) • Wind: E 6 MPH
- Game attendance: 15,708
- Referee: Ron Hudson
- TV announcers (ESPN+): Matt Warner, Reginald Walker and Emily Austin

Game information

First quarter

- GWEB – Tyler Simpson 41-yard field goal, 11:54. Runnin' Bulldogs 3–0. Drive: 8 plays, 56 yards, 3:02.
- LIB – Makai Jackson 65-yard pass from Deshawn Purdie (Chase Reeves kick), 11:07. Flames 7–3. Drive: 2 plays, 70 yards, 0:40.
- LIB – Jaylon Coleman 20-yard run (Chase Reeves kick), 8:48. Flames 14–3. Drive: 1 play, 20 yards, 0:07.
- GWEB – Tyler Simpson 35-yard field goal, 5:12. Flames 14–6. Drive: 8 plays, 57 yards, 3:36.

Second quarter

- GWEB – Sabin McLaughlin 35-yard fumble return (Tyler Simpson kick), 9:11. Flames 14–13.
- GWEB – Randy Young 65-yard run (Tyler Simpson kick), 5:44. Runnin' Bulldogs 20–14. Drive: 3 plays, 71 yards, 1:24.
- LIB – Chase Reeves 30-yard field goal, 0:00. Runnin' Bulldogs 20–17. Drive: 9 plays, 68 yards, 1:28.

Third quarter

- GWEB – Tyler Simpson 27-yard field goal, 2:34. Runnin' Bulldogs 23–17. Drive: 13 plays, 70 yards, 6:34.

Fourth quarter

- LIB – Darius Copeland 54-yard pass from Jaylen Henderson (Chase Reeves kick), 2:34. Flames 24–23. Drive: 5 plays, 68 yards, 2:39.

Statistics	GWEB	LIB
First downs	23	18
Total yards	71–304	66–379
Rushing yards	33–118	45–193
Passing yards	186	186
Passing: Comp–Att–Int	16–38–2	8–21–0
Turnovers	3	2
Time of possession	30:52	29:08

Team	Category	Player	Statistics
Gardner–Webb	Passing	Cole Pennington	16/38, 186 yards, 2 INT
Gardner–Webb	Rushing	Randy Young	4 carries, 75 yards, TD
Gardner–Webb	Receiving	Kory Jones	3 receptions, 51 yards
Liberty	Passing	Deshawn Purdie	6/17, 122 yards, TD
Liberty	Rushing	Peyton Jones	13 carries, 76 yards
Liberty	Receiving	Makai Jackson	2 receptions, 69 yards, TD

=== North Carolina Central ===
North Carolina Central Eagles (2–1) at Gardner–Webb Runnin' Bulldogs (0–3) – Game summary

Quarter	1	2	3	4	Total
Eagles	0	0	0	0	0
Runnin' Bulldogs	0	0	0	0	0

at Ernest W. Spangler Stadium • Boiling Springs, North Carolina

- Date: September 19
- Game time: 6:00 p.m.

Game information

First quarter
Second quarter
Third quarter
Fourth quarter

Statistics	NCCU	GWEB
First downs		
Plays–yards		
Rushes–yards		
Passing yards		
Passing: comp–att–int		
Turnovers		
Time of possession		

Team	Category	Player	Statistics
North Carolina Central	Passing		
North Carolina Central	Rushing		
North Carolina Central	Receiving		
Gardner–Webb	Passing		
Gardner–Webb	Rushing		
Gardner–Webb	Receiving		

=== at Marshall (FBS) ===
Gardner–Webb Runnin' Bulldogs (1–3) at Marshall Thundering Herd (2–1) – Game summary

Quarter	1	2	3	4	Total
Runnin' Bulldogs	14	7	7	7	35
Thundering Herd (FBS)	10	17	0	9	36

at Joan C. Edwards Stadium • Huntington, West Virginia

- Date: September 26
- Game time: 3:30 p.m.
- Game weather: Sunny
- Game attendance: 25,710
- Referee: Jermey Parker
- TV announcers (ESPN+): Keith Morehouse, Mark Martin and Ben Westfall

Game information

First quarter

- (12:07) GWEB – Kory Jones 11 yard pass from Cole Pennington, Tyler Simpson kick (Drive: 6 plays, 75 yards, 2:53; Gardner–Webb 7–0)
- (8:59) MRSH – Xayvion Turner-Bradshaw 48 yard pass from Carlos Del Rio-Wilson, Jorge Diaz Nicolas kick (Drive: 6 plays, 72 yards, 3:01; Tied 7–7)
- (8:47) GWEB – Giovanni Adopte 75 yard pass from Cole Pennington, Tyler Simpson kick (Drive: 1 play, 75 yards, 0:12; Gardner–Webb 14–7)
- (6:49) MRSH – Jorge Diaz Nicolas 54 yard field goal (Drive: 6 plays, 36 yards, 1:51; Gardner–Webb 14–10)

Second quarter

- (8:18) MRSH – Jo'Shon Barbie 8 yard pass from Carlo Del Rio-Wilson, Jorge Diaz Nicolas kick (Drive: 11 plays, 91 yards, 6:42; Marshall 17–14)
- (5:24) GWEB – Ruben Tshilombo 36 yard fumble recovery, Tyler Simpson kick (Gardner–Webb 21–17)
- (1:56) MRSH – Jo'Shon Barbie 5 yard run, Jorge Diaz Nicolas kick (Drive: 9 plays, 59 yards, 3:28; Marshall 24–21)
- (0:00) MRSH – Jorge Diaz Nicolas 21 yard field goal (Drive: 4 plays, 15 yards, 0:36; Marshall 27–21)

Third quarter

- (3:11) GWEB – Kory Jones 25 yard pass from Cole Pennington, Tyler Simpson kick (Drive: 15 plays, 91 yards, 6:21; Gardner–Webb 28–27)

Fourth quarter

- (9:24) GWEB – Giovanni Adopte 44 yard pass from Cole Pennington, Tyler Simpson kick (Drive: 9 plays, 80 yards, 4:04; Gardner–Webb 35–27)
- (6:06) MRSH – Xayvion Turner-Bradshaw 34 yard pass from Carlos Del Rio-Wilson, Carlos Del Rio-Wilson run failed (Drive: 8 plays, 74 yards, 3:18; Gardner–Webb 35–33)
- (0:03) MRSH – Jorge Diaz Nicolas 32 yard field goal (Drive: 10 plays, 66 yards, 1:54; Marshall 36–35)

Statistics	GWEB	MRSH
First downs	19	27
Plays–yards	60–458	70–569
Rushes–yards	27–160	35–156
Passing yards	298	413
Passing: comp–att–int	22–33–0	27–40–1
Turnovers	1	2
Time of possession	26:47	33:13

Team	Category	Player	Statistics
Gardner–Webb	Passing	Cole Pennington	22/33, 298 yards, 4 TD
Gardner–Webb	Rushing	Christian Vann	14 carries, 99 yards
Gardner–Webb	Receiving	Giovanni Adopte	7 receptions, 179 yards, 2 TD
Marshall	Passing	Carlos Del Rio-Wilson	26/38, 386 yards, 3 TD, INT
Marshall	Rushing	Carlos Del Rio-Wilson	14 carries, 48 yards
Marshall	Receiving	Xayvion Turner-Bradshaw	7 receptions, 131 yards, 2 TD

=== at Charleston Southern ===
Gardner–Webb Runnin' Bulldogs (1–4) at Charleston Southern Buccaneers (2–2) – Game summary

Quarter	1	2	3	4	Total
Runnin' Bulldogs	0	0	0	0	0
Buccaneers	0	0	0	0	0

at Buccaneer Field • North Charleston, South Carolina

- Date: October 3
- Game time: 6:00 p.m.
- TV: ESPN+

Game information

First quarter
Second quarter
Third quarter
Fourth quarter

Statistics	GWEB	CHSO
First downs		
Plays–yards		
Rushes–yards		
Passing yards		
Passing: comp–att–int		
Turnovers		
Time of possession		

Team	Category	Player	Statistics
Gardner–Webb	Passing		
Gardner–Webb	Rushing		
Gardner–Webb	Receiving		
Charleston Southern	Passing		
Charleston Southern	Rushing		
Charleston Southern	Receiving		

=== Eastern Illinois ===
Eastern Illinois Panthers (1–4) at Gardner–Webb Runnin' Bulldogs (2–4) – Game summary

Quarter	1	2	3	4	Total
Panthers	0	0	0	0	0
Runnin' Bulldogs	0	0	0	0	0

at Ernest W. Spangler Stadium • Boiling Springs, North Carolina

- Date: October 10
- Game time: 3:30 p.m.

Game information

First quarter
Second quarter
Third quarter
Fourth quarter

Statistics	EIU	GWEB
First downs		
Plays–yards		
Rushes–yards		
Passing yards		
Passing: comp–att–int		
Turnovers		
Time of possession		

Team	Category	Player	Statistics
Eastern Illinois	Passing		
Eastern Illinois	Rushing		
Eastern Illinois	Receiving		
Gardner–Webb	Passing		
Gardner–Webb	Rushing		
Gardner–Webb	Receiving		

=== at UT Martin ===
Gardner–Webb Runnin' Bulldogs (2–5) at UT Martin Skyhawks (2–4) – Game summary

Quarter	1	2	3	4	Total
Runnin' Bulldogs	0	0	0	0	0
Skyhawks	0	0	0	0	0

at Graham Stadium • Martin, Tennessee

- Date: October 17
- Game time: 3:00 p.m.

Game information

First quarter
Second quarter
Third quarter
Fourth quarter

Statistics	GWEB	UTM
First downs		
Plays–yards		
Rushes–yards		
Passing yards		
Passing: comp–att–int		
Turnovers		
Time of possession		

Team	Category	Player	Statistics
Gardner–Webb	Passing		
Gardner–Webb	Rushing		
Gardner–Webb	Receiving		
UT Martin	Passing		
UT Martin	Rushing		
UT Martin	Receiving		

=== at Southeast Missouri State ===
Gardner–Webb Runnin' Bulldogs (2–6) at Southeast Missouri State Redhawks (5–3) – Game summary

Quarter	1	2	3	4	Total
Runnin' Bulldogs	0	0	0	0	0
Redhawks	0	0	0	0	0

at Houck Stadium • Cape Girardeau, Missouri

- Date: October 31
- Game time: 2:00 p.m.

Game information

First quarter
Second quarter
Third quarter
Fourth quarter

Statistics	GWEB	SEMO
First downs		
Plays–yards		
Rushes–yards		
Passing yards		
Passing: comp–att–int		
Turnovers		
Time of possession		

Team	Category	Player	Statistics
Gardner–Webb	Passing		
Gardner–Webb	Rushing		
Gardner–Webb	Receiving		
Southeast Missouri State	Passing		
Southeast Missouri State	Rushing		
Southeast Missouri State	Receiving		

=== Lindenwood ===
Lindenwood Lions (4–4) at Gardner–Webb Runnin' Bulldogs (3–6) – Game summary

Quarter	1	2	3	4	Total
Lions	0	0	0	0	0
Runnin' Bulldogs	0	0	0	0	0

at Ernest W. Spangler Stadium • Boiling Springs, North Carolina

- Date: November 7
- Game time: 1:30 p.m.

Game information

First quarter
Second quarter
Third quarter
Fourth quarter

Statistics	LIN	GWEB
First downs		
Plays–yards		
Rushes–yards		
Passing yards		
Passing: comp–att–int		
Turnovers		
Time of possession		

Team	Category	Player	Statistics
Lindenwood	Passing		
Lindenwood	Rushing		
Lindenwood	Receiving		
Gardner–Webb	Passing		
Gardner–Webb	Rushing		
Gardner–Webb	Receiving		

=== at Western Illinois ===
Gardner–Webb Runnin' Bulldogs (3–7) at Western Illinois Leathernecks (6–4) – Game summary

Quarter	1	2	3	4	Total
Runnin' Bulldogs	0	0	0	0	0
Leathernecks	0	0	0	0	0

at Hanson Field • Macomb, Illinois

- Date: November 14
- Game time: 2:00 p.m.

Game information

First quarter
Second quarter
Third quarter
Fourth quarter

Statistics	GWEB	WIU
First downs		
Plays–yards		
Rushes–yards		
Passing yards		
Passing: comp–att–int		
Turnovers		
Time of possession		

Team	Category	Player	Statistics
Gardner–Webb	Passing		
Gardner–Webb	Rushing		
Gardner–Webb	Receiving		
Western Illinois	Passing		
Western Illinois	Rushing		
Western Illinois	Receiving		

=== Tennessee State ===
Tennessee State Tigers (3–8) at Gardner–Webb Runnin' Bulldogs (3–8) – Game summary

Quarter	1	2	3	4	Total
Tigers	0	0	0	0	0
Runnin' Bulldogs	0	0	0	0	0

at Ernest W. Spangler Stadium • Boiling Springs, North Carolina

- Date: November 21
- Game time: 1:30 p.m.

Game information

First quarter
Second quarter
Third quarter
Fourth quarter

Statistics	TNST	GWEB
First downs		
Plays–yards		
Rushes–yards		
Passing yards		
Passing: comp–att–int		
Turnovers		
Time of possession		

Team	Category	Player	Statistics
Tennessee State	Passing		
Tennessee State	Rushing		
Tennessee State	Receiving		
Gardner–Webb	Passing		
Gardner–Webb	Rushing		
Gardner–Webb	Receiving		
