= Joe Davis (American football coach) =

American football coach (born c. 1979)

Current position
- Title: Head coach
- Team: Western Illinois
- Conference: Ohio Valley Conference
- Record: 16–20

Biographical details
- Born: c. 1980 (age 45–46); Brighton, Michigan, U.S.
- Education: Adrian College (2002); Wayne State University (2005)

Playing career
- 1999–2002: Adrian
- 2003: AFC Rangers
- 2004: Evansville BlueCats
- 2004: Lubbock Lone Stars
- 2005: Fayetteville Guard
- 2006: Green Bay Blizzard
- 2006: Columbus Destroyers
- Position: Quarterback

Coaching career (HC unless noted)
- 2003: AFC Rangers (OC)
- 2003–2005: Wayne State (MI) (QB)
- 2006–2008: North Park (AHC/OC/QB)
- 2009–2012: Wheaton (IL) (OC/QB)
- 2013–2014: Shippensburg (OC/QB)
- 2015: Northern Iowa (OC/QB)
- 2016–2017: Fordham (QB)
- 2018–2021: Albany (AHC/OC/QB)
- 2022–2023: Eastern Illinois (OC/QB)
- 2024–present: Western Illinois

Head coaching record
- Overall: 8–16

Accomplishments and honors

Championships
- 1 OVC (2026)

Joe Davis (born c. 1980) is an American college football coach. He is the head football coach for Western Illinois University, a position he will took over in 2024. He also coached for the AFC Rangers in Austria, Wayne State, North Park, Wheaton, Shippensburg, Northern Iowa, Fordham, Albany, and Eastern Illinois. He played college football for Adrian as a quarterback and professionally for the AFC Rangers of the Austrian Football League, the Evansville BlueCats and the Fayetteville Guard of the National Indoor Football League (NIFL), the Lubbock Lone Stars of the Intense Football League (IFL), the Green Bay Blizzard of AF2, and the Columbus Destroyers of the Arena Football League (AFL).

== Head coaching record ==
Year	Team	Overall	Conference	Standing	Bowl/playoffs
Western Illinois Leathernecks (Big South–OVC Football Association) (2024–present)
2024	Western Illinois	4–8	3–5	T–6th	
2025	Western Illinois	4–8	3–5	T–6th	
2026	Western Illinois	8–4	6–1	1st	
Western Illinois:		16–20	12–11		
Total:		16–20			
