= 2026 Charleston Southern Buccaneers football team =

American college football season

2026 Charleston Southern Buccaneers football
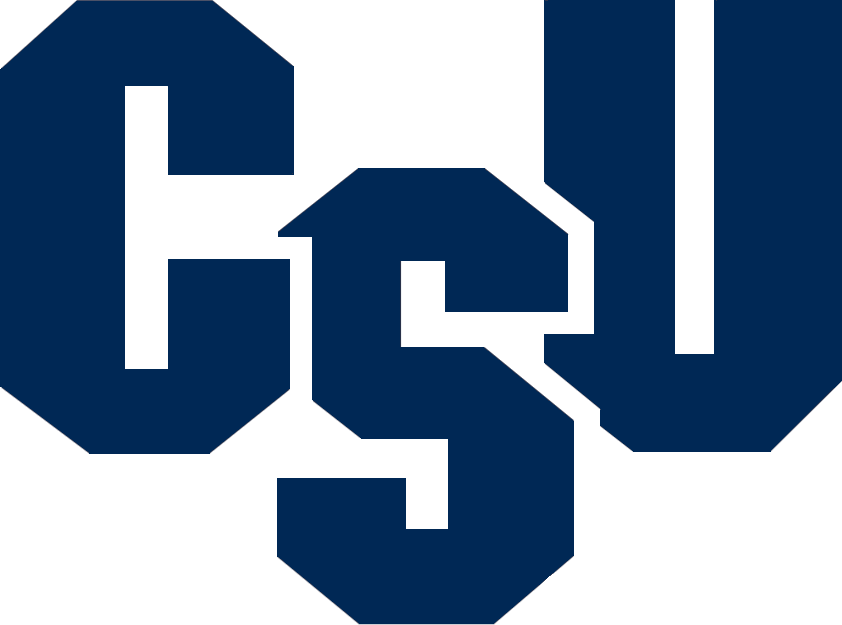
- Conference: Ohio Valley Conference
- Record: 4–8 (1–6 OVC)
- Head coach: Gabe Giardina (4th season)
- Offensive coordinator: Seth Strickland (2nd season)
- Defensive coordinator: Randall McCray (1st season)
- Home stadium: Buccaneer Field

2026 Ohio Valley Conference football standings
	Conf.			Overall
Team	W		L	W		L
Western Illinois $^	6	–	1	8	–	4
UT Martin	5	–	2	6	–	6
Southeast Missouri State	5	–	2	7	–	5
Lindenwood	4	–	3	5	–	6
Eastern Illinois	3	–	4	4	–	8
Tennessee State	2	–	5	4	–	8
Gardner–Webb	2	–	5	3	–	9
Charleston Southern	1	–	6	4	–	8
$ – Conference champion; ^ – FCS playoff participant; As of November 22, 2026; Rankings from STATS Poll

The 2026 Charleston Southern Buccaneers football team will represent Charleston Southern University as a member of the Ohio Valley Conference (OVC) during the 2026 NCAA Division I FCS football season. The Buccaneers will be led by fourth year head coach Gabe Giardina and will play their home games at Buccaneer Field in North Charleston, South Carolina.

== Schedule ==
Date	Time	Opponent	Site	TV	Result	Attendance
August 27	7:00 p.m.	at Lindenwood	Harlen C. Hunter Stadium; St. Charles, MO	ESPN+	L 17–20	4,116
September 5	7:00 p.m.	at Georgia Southern*	Allen E. Paulson Stadium; Statesboro, GA	ESPN+	L 0–31	22,426
September 12	6:00 p.m.	at The Citadel*	Johnson Hagood Stadium; Charleston, SC	ESPN+	W 26–20 ^{2OT}	9,875
September 19	6:00 p.m.	Point*	Buccaneer Field; North Charleston, SC	ESPN+	W 65–0	2,818
October 3	6:00 p.m.	Gardner–Webb	Buccaneer Field; North Charleston, SC	ESPN+	L 10–12	2,071
October 10	6:00 p.m.	No. 21 South Carolina State*	Buccaneer Field; North Charleston, SC	ESPN+	W 49–39	334
October 17	12:00 p.m.	at Clemson*	Memorial Stadium; Clemson, SC	ACCN	L 0–37	75,917
October 24	3:30 p.m.	at Tennessee State	Nissan Stadium; Nashville, TN	ESPN+	W 20–7	1,401
October 31	2:00 p.m.	Western Illinois^{†}	Buccaneer Field; North Charleston, SC	ESPN+	L 35–42	4,055
November 7	2:00 p.m.	UT Martin	Buccaneer Field; North Charleston, SC	ESPN+	L 10–20	2,201
November 14	2:00 p.m.	Southeast Missouri State	Buccaneer Field; North Charleston, SC	ESPN+	L 17–43	3,123
November 21	1:00 p.m.	at Eastern Illinois	O'Brien Field; Charleston, IL	ESPN+	L 17–10 ^{OT}	1,410
*Non-conference game; ^{†}Homecoming; Rankings from STATS Poll released prior to the game; All times are in Eastern time

== Game summaries ==
=== at Lindenwood ===
Charleston Southern Buccaneers (0–0) at Lindenwood Lions (0–0) – Game summary

Quarter	1	2	3	4	Total
Buccaneers	0	3	0	14	17
Lions	0	10	7	3	20

at Harlen C. Hunter Stadium • St. Charles, Missouri

- Date: August 27
- Game time: 7:00 p.m.
- Game weather: Sunny
- Game attendance: 4,116
- Referee: John Kellermeier
- TV announcers (ESPN+): Bob Ramsey and Zach Zook

Game information

First quarter

- No scoring plays.

Second quarter

- CHSO – Matt Rolader 50-yard field goal, 12:16. Buccaneers 3–0. Drive: 10 plays, 48 yards, 4:27.
- LIN – Will Graham 32-yard field goal, 5:45. Tied 3–3. Drive: 11 plays, 64 yards, 6:27.
- LIN – Isaac Edwards 85-yard interception return (Will Graham kick), 0:13. Lions 10–3.

Third quarter

- LIN – Pops Battle 22-yard run (Will Graham kick), 9:41. Lions 17–3. Drive: 8 plays, 64 yards, 3:14.

Fourth quarter

- CHSO – Mekhi Campbell 4-yard pass from Lek Powell (Matt Rolader kick), 14:55. Lions 17–10. Drive: 8 plays, 71 yards, 3:58.
- LIN – Will Graham 28-yard field goal, 5:36. Lions 20–10. Drive: 11 plays, 67 yards, 6:11.
- CHSO – Hunter Green 14-yard pass from Lek Powell (Matt Rolader kick), 2:03. Lions 20–17. Drive: 10 plays, 80 yards, 3:28.

Statistics	CHSO	LIN
First downs	19	16
Plays–yards	63–315	61–312
Rushes–yards	31–107	40–170
Passing yards	208	142
Passing: comp–att–int	18–32–1	14–21–0
Turnovers	2	0
Time of possession	27:31	32:29

Team	Category	Player	Statistics
Charleston Southern	Passing	Lek Powell	18/32, 208 yards, 2 TD, INT
Charleston Southern	Rushing	Dwayne Wright	11 carries, 58 yards
Charleston Southern	Receiving	KD Dorsey	3 receptions, 46 yards
Lindenwood	Passing	Pops Battle	14/21, 142 yards
Lindenwood	Rushing	Jared Rhodes	11 carries, 63 yards
Lindenwood	Receiving	Jalen Smith	3 receptions, 47 yards

=== at Georgia Southern (FBS) ===
Charleston Southern Buccaneers (0–1) at Georgia Southern Eagles (FBS) (0–0) – Game summary

Quarter	1	2	3	4	Total
Buccaneers (FCS)	0	0	0	0	0
Eagles	21	3	7	0	31

at Paulson Stadium • Statesboro, Georgia

- Date: September 5
- Game time: 7:00 p.m.
- Game weather: Sunny • Temperature: 93 °F (34 °C) • Wind: W at 5 miles per hour (8.0 km/h)
- Game attendance: 22,426
- Referee: Marty Adams
- TV announcers (ESPN+): Danny Waugh, Jayson Foster, and Capers Childs

Game information

First quarter

- GASO - Jamarian Samuel 7-yard run (Tripp Bryant kick), 8:51. Eagles 7–0. Drive: 14 plays, 75 yards, 6:09.
- GASO – Ashton Hollins 57-yard pass from Max Johnson (Tripp Bryant kick), 6:58. Eagles 14–0. Drive: 1 play, 57 yards, 0:09.
- GASO – Weston Bryan 1-yard run (Tripp Bryant kick), 0:16. Eagles 21–0. Drive: 11 plays, 69 yards, 5:10.

Second quarter

- GASO – Tripp Bryant 32-yard field goal, 0:19. Eagles 24–0. Drive: 8 plays, 36 yards, 0:52.

Third quarter

- GASO – Ty Cummings 18-yard run (Tripp Bryant kick), 7:17. Eagles 31–0. Drive: 9 plays, 90 yards, 4:28.

Fourth quarter

- No scoring plays.

Statistics	CHSO	GASO
First downs	10	26
Plays–yards	60–117	77–513
Rushes–yards	31–8	30–162
Passing yards	109	351
Passing: comp–att–int	9–29–1	33–47–1
Turnovers	2	1
Time of possession	24:04	35:56

Team	Category	Player	Statistics
Charleston Southern	Passing	Lek Powell	4/15, 35 yards
Charleston Southern	Rushing	Dwayne Wright	6 carries, 14 yards
Charleston Southern	Receiving	KD Dorsey	1 reception, 28 yards
Georgia Southern	Passing	Max Johnson	28/39, 281 yards, TD
Georgia Southern	Rushing	Jamarian Samuel	4 carries, 46 yards
Georgia Southern	Receiving	Ashton Hollins	8 receptions, 106 yards, TD

=== at The Citadel ===
Charleston Southern Buccaneers (0–2) at The Citadel Bulldogs (1–1) – Game summary

Quarter	1	2	3	4	OT	2OT	Total
Buccaneers	7	3	0	3	7	6	26
Bulldogs	7	0	3	3	7	0	20

at Johnson Hagood Stadium • Charleston, South Carolina

- Date: September 12
- Game time: 6:00 p.m.
- Game weather: Sunny
- Game attendance: 9,875
- Referee: Jason Graham
- TV announcers (ESPN+): Justin Biegel, Ford Werness, and Hank Tatum

Game information

First quarter

- CIT – Michael Lorino 33-yard pass from Quentin Hayes (Evan Kiely kick), 9:01. Bulldogs 7–0. Drive: 8 plays, 71 yards, 4:26.
- CHSO – Harry Smalls 1-yard run (Matt Rolader kick), 1:38. Tied 7–7. Drive: 5 plays, 19 yards, 2:30.

Second quarter

- CHSO – Matt Rolader 48-yard field goal, 10:27. Buccaneers 10–7. Drive: 8 plays, 35 yards.

Third quarter

- CIT – Evan Kiely 45-yard field goal, 8:53. Tied 10–10. Drive: 10 plays, 49 yards, 6:07.

Fourth quarter

- CIT – Evan Kiely 37-yard field goal, 14:16. Bulldogs 13–10. Drive: 13 plays, 57 yards, 7:29.
- CHSO – Matt Rolader 52-yard field goal, 6:14. Tied 13–13. Drive: 5 plays, 28 yards, 2:18.

Overtime

- CHSO – Dwayne Wright 2-yard run (Matt Rolader kick). Buccaneers 20–13. Drive: 3 plays, 25 yards.
- CIT – Gavin Garcia 2-yard run (Evan Kiely kick). Tied 20–20. Drive: 5 plays, 25 yards.

Second overtime

- CHSO – Hakeem Watters 9-yard run. Buccaneers 26–20. Drive: 3 plays, 25 yards.

Statistics	CHSO	CIT
First downs	14	17
Plays–yards	51–188	60–308
Rushes–yards	43–104	57–235
Passing yards	84	73
Passing: comp–att–int	8–16–0	3–14–1
Turnovers	1	1
Time of possession	25:50	34:10

Team	Category	Player	Statistics
Charleston Southern	Passing	Lek Powell	8/16, 84 yards
Charleston Southern	Rushing	Hakeem Waters	11 carries, 56 yards, TD
Charleston Southern	Receiving	Quay Kindell	2 receptions, 24 yards
The Citadel	Passing	Quentin Hayes	3/14, 73 yards, TD, INT
The Citadel	Rushing	Gavin Garcia	23 carries, 84 yards, TD
The Citadel	Receiving	Michael Lorino	1 reception, 33 yards, TD

=== Point (NAIA) ===
Point Skyhawks (0–2) at Charleston Southern Buccaneers (1–2) – Game summary

Quarter	1	2	3	4	Total
Skyhawks (NAIA)	0	0	0	0	0
Buccaneers	21	7	30	7	65

at Buccaneer Field • North Charleston, South Carolina

- Date: September 19
- Game time: 6:00 p.m.
- Game weather: Sunny • Temperature: 84 °F (29 °C) • Wind: SE at 6 miles per hour (9.7 km/h)
- Game attendance: 2,818
- Referee: Gabriel Tomlin
- TV announcers (ESPN+): Justin Biegel (play-by-play), Ford Werness (analyst) and Hank Tatum (sideline)

Game information

First quarter

- (13:33) CHSO – Hakeem Watters 32-yard run, Matt Rolader kick (Drive: 3 plays, 79 yards, 1:27; Charleston Southern 7–0)
- (9:36) CHSO – Hakeem Watters 1-yard run, Matt Rolader kick (Drive: 6 plays, 68 yards, 2:56; Charleston Southern 14–0)
- (2:41) CHSO – Mekhi Campfield 39-yard pass from Lek Powell, Matt Rolader kick (Drive: 9 plays, 90 yards, 4:57; Charleston Southern 21–0)

Second quarter

- (13:35) CHSO – Dwayne Wright 1-yard run, Matt Rolader kick (Drive: 5 plays, 41 yards, 1:25; Charleston Southern 28–0)
- (13:20) CHSO – Hakeem Watters 59-yard run, Matt Rolader kick (Drive: 1 play, 59 yards, 0:11; Charleston Southern 35–0)
- (12:06) CHSO – 0-yard safety (Charleston Southern 37–0)

Third quarter

- (11:55) CHSO – Quay Kindell 73-yard kickoff return, Zach Gordon kick (Charleston Southern 44–0)
- (8:23) CHSO – Kason Hooks 62-yard interception, Zach Gordon kick (Charleston Southern 51–0)
- (4:34) CHSO – Brandon Musch 1-yard run, Reid Montgomery kick (Drive: 5 plays, 45 yards, 1:36; Charleston Southern 58–0)

Fourth quarter

- (2:18) CHSO – Sharode Richardson 66-yard run, Reid Montgomery kick (Drive: 3 plays, 80 yards, 1:39; Charleston Southern 65–0)

Statistics	POIN	CHSO
First downs	9	21
Plays–yards	62–41	54–582
Rushes–yards	34–3	34–348
Passing yards	38	234
Passing: comp–att–int	8–28–1	13–20–0
Turnovers	1	1
Time of possession	25:53	31:31

Team	Category	Player	Statistics
Point	Passing	Samir Wylie	6/25, 39 yards
Point	Rushing	Jace Grant	4 carries, 21 yards
Point	Receiving	Messiah Wilson	2 receptions, 18 yards
Charleston Southern	Passing	Lek Powell	7/8, 153 yards, TD
Charleston Southern	Rushing	Hakeem Watters	7 carries, 123 yards, 3 TD
Charleston Southern	Receiving	Quay Kindell	3 receptions, 64 yards

=== Gardner–Webb ===
Gardner–Webb Runnin' Bulldogs (1–4) at Charleston Southern Buccaneers (2–2) – Game summary

Quarter	1	2	3	4	Total
Runnin' Bulldogs	0	0	0	0	0
Buccaneers	0	0	0	0	0

at Buccaneer Field • North Charleston, South Carolina

- Date: October 3
- Game time: 6:00 p.m.
- TV: ESPN+

Game information

First quarter
Second quarter
Third quarter
Fourth quarter

Statistics	GWEB	CHSO
First downs		
Plays–yards		
Rushes–yards		
Passing yards		
Passing: comp–att–int		
Turnovers		
Time of possession		

Team	Category	Player	Statistics
Gardner–Webb	Passing		
Gardner–Webb	Rushing		
Gardner–Webb	Receiving		
Charleston Southern	Passing		
Charleston Southern	Rushing		
Charleston Southern	Receiving		

=== No. 21 South Carolina State ===
No. 21 South Carolina State Bulldogs (5–1) at Charleston Southern Buccaneers (2–3) – Game summary

Quarter	1	2	3	4	Total
No. 21 Bulldogs	0	0	0	0	0
Buccaneers	0	0	0	0	0

at Buccaneer Field • North Charleston, South Carolina

- Date: October 10
- Game time: 6:00 p.m.

Game information

First quarter
Second quarter
Third quarter
Fourth quarter

Statistics	SCST	CHSO
First downs		
Plays–yards		
Rushes–yards		
Passing yards		
Passing: comp–att–int		
Turnovers		
Time of possession		

Team	Category	Player	Statistics
South Carolina State	Passing		
South Carolina State	Rushing		
South Carolina State	Receiving		
Charleston Southern	Passing		
Charleston Southern	Rushing		
Charleston Southern	Receiving		

=== at Clemson (FBS) ===
Charleston Southern Buccaneers (0–0) at Clemson Tigers (FBS) (3–2) – Game summary

Quarter	1	2	3	4	Total
Buccaneers	0	0	0	0	0
Tigers (FBS)	0	0	0	0	0

at Memorial Stadium • Clemson, South Carolina

- Date: October 17

Game information

First quarter
Second quarter
Third quarter
Fourth quarter

Statistics	CHSO	CLEM
First downs		
Plays–yards		
Rushes–yards		
Passing yards		
Passing: comp–att–int		
Turnovers		
Time of possession		

Team	Category	Player	Statistics
Charleston Southern	Passing		
Charleston Southern	Rushing		
Charleston Southern	Receiving		
Clemson	Passing		
Clemson	Rushing		
Clemson	Receiving		

=== at Tennessee State ===
Charleston Southern Buccaneers (3–4) at Tennessee State Tigers (2–5) – Game summary

Quarter	1	2	3	4	Total
Buccaneers	0	0	0	0	0
Tigers	0	0	0	0	0

at Nissan Stadium • Nashville, Tennessee

- Date: October 24
- Game time: 3:30 p.m.

Game information

First quarter
Second quarter
Third quarter
Fourth quarter

Statistics	CHSO	TNST
First downs		
Plays–yards		
Rushes–yards		
Passing yards		
Passing: comp–att–int		
Turnovers		
Time of possession		

Team	Category	Player	Statistics
Charleston Southern	Passing		
Charleston Southern	Rushing		
Charleston Southern	Receiving		
Tennessee State	Passing		
Tennessee State	Rushing		
Tennessee State	Receiving		

=== Western Illinois ===
Western Illinois Leathernecks (4–4) at Charleston Southern Buccaneers (4–4) – Game summary

Quarter	1	2	3	4	Total
Leathernecks	0	0	0	0	0
Buccaneers	0	0	0	0	0

at Buccaneer Field • North Charleston, South Carolina

- Date: October 31
- Game time: 2:00 p.m.

Game information

First quarter
Second quarter
Third quarter
Fourth quarter

Statistics	WIU	CHSO
First downs		
Plays–yards		
Rushes–yards		
Passing yards		
Passing: comp–att–int		
Turnovers		
Time of possession		

Team	Category	Player	Statistics
Western Illinois	Passing		
Western Illinois	Rushing		
Western Illinois	Receiving		
Charleston Southern	Passing		
Charleston Southern	Rushing		
Charleston Southern	Receiving		

=== UT Martin ===
UT Martin Skyhawks (3–6) at Charleston Southern Buccaneers (4–5) – Game summary

Quarter	1	2	3	4	Total
Skyhawks	0	0	0	0	0
Buccaneers	0	0	0	0	0

at Buccaneer Field • North Charleston, South Carolina

- Date: November 7
- Game time: 2:00 p.m.

Game information

First quarter
Second quarter
Third quarter
Fourth quarter

Statistics	UTM	CHSO
First downs		
Plays–yards		
Rushes–yards		
Passing yards		
Passing: comp–att–int		
Turnovers		
Time of possession		

Team	Category	Player	Statistics
UT Martin	Passing		
UT Martin	Rushing		
UT Martin	Receiving		
Charleston Southern	Passing		
Charleston Southern	Rushing		
Charleston Southern	Receiving		

=== Southeast Missouri State ===
Southeast Missouri State Redhawks (6–4) at Charleston Southern Buccaneers (4–6) – Game summary

Quarter	1	2	3	4	Total
Redhawks	0	0	0	0	0
Buccaneers	0	0	0	0	0

at Buccaneer Field • North Charleston, South Carolina

- Date: November 14
- Game time: 2:00 p.m.

Game information

First quarter
Second quarter
Third quarter
Fourth quarter

Statistics	SEMO	CHSO
First downs		
Plays–yards		
Rushes–yards		
Passing yards		
Passing: comp–att–int		
Turnovers		
Time of possession		

Team	Category	Player	Statistics
Southeast Missouri State	Passing		
Southeast Missouri State	Rushing		
Southeast Missouri State	Receiving		
Charleston Southern	Passing		
Charleston Southern	Rushing		
Charleston Southern	Receiving		

=== at Eastern Illinois ===
Charleston Southern Buccaneers (4–7) at Eastern Illinois Panthers (3–8) – Game summary

Quarter	1	2	3	4	Total
Buccaneers	0	0	0	0	0
Panthers	0	0	0	0	0

at O'Brien Field • Charleston, Illinois

- Date: November 21
- Game time: 1:00 p.m.

Game information

First quarter
Second quarter
Third quarter
Fourth quarter

Statistics	CHSO	EIU
First downs		
Plays–yards		
Rushes–yards		
Passing yards		
Passing: comp–att–int		
Turnovers		
Time of possession		

Team	Category	Player	Statistics
Charleston Southern	Passing		
Charleston Southern	Rushing		
Charleston Southern	Receiving		
Eastern Illinois	Passing		
Eastern Illinois	Rushing		
Eastern Illinois	Receiving		
