= 2026 Western Illinois Leathernecks football team =

American college football season

2026 Western Illinois Leathernecks football
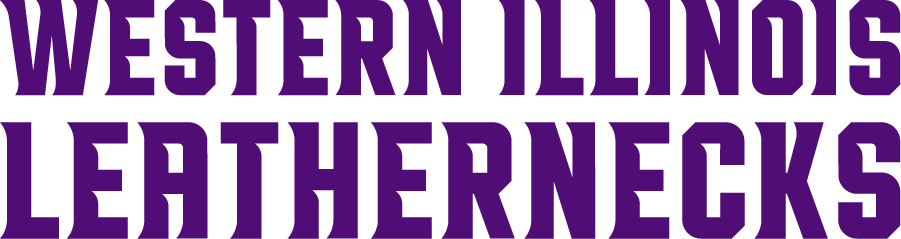

OVC champion

FCS Playoffs
- Conference: Ohio Valley Conference
- Record: 8–4 (6–1 OVC)
- Head coach: Joe Davis (3rd season)
- Offensive coordinator: Brad Wilson (3rd season)
- Defensive coordinator: Landon Fox (2nd season)
- Home stadium: Hanson Field

2026 Ohio Valley Conference football standings
	Conf.			Overall
Team	W		L	W		L
Western Illinois $^	6	–	1	8	–	4
UT Martin	5	–	2	6	–	6
Southeast Missouri State	5	–	2	7	–	5
Lindenwood	4	–	3	5	–	6
Eastern Illinois	3	–	4	4	–	8
Tennessee State	2	–	5	4	–	8
Gardner–Webb	2	–	5	3	–	9
Charleston Southern	1	–	6	4	–	8
$ – Conference champion; ^ – FCS playoff participant; As of November 22, 2026; Rankings from STATS Poll

The 2026 Western Illinois Leathernecks football team will represent Western Illinois University as a member of the Ohio Valley Conference (OVC) during the 2026 NCAA Division I FCS football season. The Leathernecks will be led by third-year head coach Joe Davis and will play their home games at Hanson Field in Macomb, Illinois.

== Schedule ==
Date	Time	Opponent	Site	TV	Result	Attendance
August 27	6:00 p.m.	No. 24 (NAIA) Northwestern (IA)*	Hanson Field; Macomb, IL	ESPN+	W 65–14	2,353
September 5	6:00 p.m.	No. 4 Illinois State*	Hanson Field; Macomb, IL	ESPN+	L 10–41	2,716
September 12	6:15 p.m.	at Wisconsin*	Camp Randall Stadium; Madison, WI	BTN	L 9–36	65,274
September 19	6:00 p.m.	Morehead State*	Hanson Field; Macomb, IL	ESPN+	W 59–2	3,151
September 26	3:00 p.m.	at North Alabama*	Bank Independent Stadium; Florence, AL	ESPN+	L 20–23	9,872
October 3	3:00 p.m.	Tennessee State	Hanson Field; Macomb, IL	ESPN+	W 28–21	2,563
October 17	2:00 p.m.	at Southeast Missouri State	Houck Stadium; Cape Girardeau, MO	ESPN+	L 30–40	3,276
October 24	3:00 p.m.	UT Martin^{†}	Hanson Field; Macomb, IL	ESPN+	W 55–24	3,243
October 31	1:00 p.m.	at Charleston Southern	Buccaneer Field; North Charleston, SC	ESPN+	W 42–35	4,055
November 7	2:00 p.m.	at Eastern Illinois	O'Brien Field; Charleston, IL	ESPN+	W 44–23	3,609
November 14	1:00 p.m.	Gardner–Webb	Hanson Field; Macomb, IL	ESPN+	W 45–7	2,379
November 21	2:00 p.m.	at Lindenwood	Harlen C. Hunter Stadium; St. Charles, MO	ESPN+	W 41–7	3,514
*Non-conference game; ^{†}Homecoming; Rankings from STATS Poll released prior to the game; All times are in Central time

== Game Summaries ==
=== No. 24 (NAIA) Northwestern (IA) ===
No. 24 (NAIA) Northwestern (IA) Red Raiders (0–0) at Western Illinois Leathernecks (0–0) – Game summary

Quarter	1	2	3	4	Total
No. 24 (NAIA) Red Raiders	7	0	7	0	14
Leathernecks	7	20	24	14	65

at Hanson Field • Macomb, Illinois

- Date: August 27
- Game time: 6:00 p.m.
- Game weather: Sunny
- Game attendance: 2,353
- Referee: Drew Ison
- TV: ESPN+

Game information

First quarter

- NWC – Caleb Moore 19-yard pass from Colby Duncan (Gianna Bennett kick), 14:44. Red Raiders 7–0. Drive: 2 plays, 19 yards, 0:10.
- WIU – LeBron Morgan 38-yard fumble return (Ronan Culkin kick), 8:23. Tied 7–7.

Second quarter

- WIU – Kennedy McGill 19-yard run (Ronan Culkin kick BLOCKED), 14:53. Leathernecks 13–7. Drive: 12 plays, 85 yards, 6:27.
- WIU – Avery Knight 15-yard run (Ronan Culkin kick), 12:59. Leathernecks 20–7. Drive: 1 play, 15 yards, 0:05.
- WIU – David Hargro 2-yard pass from Kennedy McGill (Ronan Culkin kick), 2:59. Leathernecks 27–7. Drive: 8 plays, 34 yards, 4:42.

Third quarter

- NWC – Solomon Tea 25-yard pass from Colby Duncan (Gianna Bennett kick), 11:50. Leathernecks 27–14. Drive: 7 plays, 75 yards, 3:10.
- WIU – Kennedy McGill 10-yard run (Ronan Culkin kick), 8:33. Leathernecks 34–14. Drive: 8 plays, 91 yards, 3:13.
- WIU – Ihson Jackson-Anderson 29-yard run (Ronan Culkin kick), 6:36. Leathernecks 41–14. Drive: 2 plays, 35 yards, 0:40.
- WIU – Ronan Culkin 36-yard field goal, 3:11. Leathernecks 44–14. Drive: 5 plays, 18 yards, 2:26.
- WIU – Kennedy McGill 6-yard run (Ronan Culkin kick), 0:50. Leathernecks 51–14. Drive: 3 plays, 33 yards, 1:24.

Fourth quarter

- WIU – Aric Johnson 35-yard pass from Kennedy McGill (Ronan Culkin kick), 11:23. Leathernecks 58–14. Drive: 7 plays, 72 yards, 3:22.
- WIU – Gage Sturgill 8-yard run (Ronan Culkin kick), 0:54. Leathernecks 65–14. Drive: 14 plays, 89 yards, 7:20.

Statistics	NWC	WIU
First downs	9	28
Plays–yards	49–168	75–539
Rushes–yards	19–9	50–321
Passing yards	159	218
Passing: comp–att–int	17–30–2	20–25–1
Turnovers	3	2
Time of possession	23:35	36:25

Team	Category	Player	Statistics
Northwestern (IA)	Passing	Colby Duncan	15/28, 140 yards, 2 TD, 2 INT
Northwestern (IA)	Rushing	Gardner Casey	2 carries, 9 yards
Northwestern (IA)	Receiving	Caleb Moore	6 receptions, 72 yards, TD
Western Illinois	Passing	Kennedy McGill	15/17, 194 yards, 2 TD
Western Illinois	Rushing	Kennedy McGill	15 carries, 98 yards, 3 TD
Western Illinois	Receiving	Christian Anaya	5 receptions, 88 yards

=== No. 4 Illinois State ===
No. 4 Illinois State Redbirds (1–0) at Western Illinois Leathernecks (1–0) – Game summary

Quarter	1	2	3	4	Total
No. 4 Redbirds	17	10	7	7	41
Leathernecks	0	3	0	7	10

at Hanson Field • Macomb, Illinois

- Date: September 5
- Game time: 6:00 p.m.
- Game weather: Sunny
- Game attendance: 2,716
- Referee: Drew Myers
- TV: ESPN+

Game information

First quarter

- ILST – Michael Cosentino 30-yard field goal, 10:29. Redbirds 3–0. Drive: 13 plays, 62 yards, 4:26.
- ILST – Alex Herrera 23-yard pass from Beckham Pellant (Michael Cosentino kick), 4:41. Redbirds 10–0. Drive: 13 plays, 85 yards, 4:55.
- ILST – Seth Glatz 2-yard run (Michael Cosentino kick), 0:13. Redbirds 17–0. Drive: 6 plays, 46 yards, 2:42.

Second quarter

- WIU – Ronan Culkin 22-yard field goal, 9:42. Redbirds 17–3. Drive: 14 plays, 80 yards, 5:26.
- ILST – Stevan Gavric 36-yard pass from Gage Roy (Michael Cosentino kick), 5:24. Redbirds 24–3. Drive: 10 plays, 75 yards, 4:18.
- ILST – Michael Cosentino 29-yard field goal, 0:26. Redbirds 27–3. Drive: 4 plays, -1 yard, 1:13.

Third quarter

- ILST – Victor Dawson 1-yard run (Michael Cosentino kick), 10:23. Redbirds 34–3. Drive: 7 plays, 61 yards, 2:51.

Fourth quarter

- ILST – Victor Dawson 6-yard run (Michael Cosentino kick), 13:38. Redbirds 41–3. Drive: 5 plays, 65 yards, 2:07.
- WIU – Cason Carswell 3-yard run (Ronan Culkin kick), 7:06. Redbirds 41–10. Drive: 8 plays, 73 yards, 3:43.

Statistics	ILST	WIU
First downs	29	15
Plays–yards	82–496	63–315
Rushes–yards	47–239	23–52
Passing yards	257	263
Passing: comp–att–int	16–35–1	23–40–1
Turnovers	1	1
Time of possession	34:11	25:49

Team	Category	Player	Statistics
Illinois State	Passing	Beckham Pellant	8/22, 132 yards, TD, INT
Illinois State	Rushing	Chase Kwiatkowski	4 carries, 76 yards
Illinois State	Receiving	Dylan Lord	5 receptions, 72 yards
Western Illinois	Passing	Cason Carswell	9/18, 140 yards
Western Illinois	Rushing	Josh Robinson	5 carries, 22 yards
Western Illinois	Receiving	Christian Anaya	4 receptions, 78 yards

=== at Wisconsin (FBS) ===
Western Illinois Leathernecks (1–1) at Wisconsin Badgers (FBS) (0–1) – Game summary

Quarter	1	2	3	4	Total
Leathernecks	3	3	3	0	9
Badgers (FBS)	17	6	7	6	36

at Camp Randall Stadium • Madison, Wisconsin

- Date: September 12
- Game time: 6:15 p.m.
- Game weather: Sunny, 77 °F (25 °C); Wind: NW 6 miles per hour (9.7 km/h)
- Game attendance: 65,274
- Referee: Kole Knueppel
- TV announcers (BTN): Lisa Byington, Anthony Herron and Melanie Ricks

Game information

First quarter

- (14:45) WIS – Abu Sama 72-yard run, Gavin Lahm kick (Drive: 1 play, 72 yards, 0:06; Wisconsin 7–0)
- (10:15) WIS – Gavin Lahm 30-yard field goal (Drive: 6 plays, 42 yards, 2:42; Wisconsin 10–0)
- (7:54) WIS – Carson Van Dinter punt block return, Gavin Lahm kick (Drive: 3 plays, 5 yards, 2:21; Wisconsin 17–0)
- (1:52) WIU – Ronan Culkin 27-yard field goal (Drive: 11 plays, 65 yards, 6:02; Wisconsin 17–3)

Second quarter

- (12:48) WIS – Gavin Lahm 49-yard field goal (Drive: 10 plays, 37 yards, 4:00; Wisconsin 20–3)
- (4:59) WIU – Ronan Culkin 27-yard field goal (Drive: 14 plays, 65 yards, 7:49; Wisconsin 20–6)
- (2:30) WIS – Gavin Lahm 51-yard field goal (Drive: 5 plays, 25 yards, 2:25; Wisconsin 23–3)

Third quarter

- (10:24) WIU – Ronan Culkin 34-yard field goal (Drive: 11 plays, 59 yards, 4:36; Wisconsin 23–9)
- (5:39) WIS – Darrion Dupree 28-yard run, Gavin Lahm kick (Drive: 8 plays, 68 yards, 4:40; Wisconsin 30–9)

Fourth quarter

- (5:14) WIS – Chris Brooks Jr. 33-yard pass from Colton Joseph, Gavin Lahm kick failed (Drive: 2 plays, 84 yards, 0:58; Wisconsin 36–9)

Statistics	WIU	WIS
First downs	15	16
Plays–yards	62–302	53–406
Rushes–yards	38–154	31–233
Passing yards	15–148	12–173
Passing: comp–att–int	15–24–0	12–22–0
Turnovers	0	0
Time of possession	34:57	25:03

Team	Category	Player	Statistics
Western Illinois	Passing	Kennedy McGill	13/22, 139 yards
Western Illinois	Rushing	Kennedy McGill	18 carries, 88 yards
Western Illinois	Receiving	Jacob Kania	2 receptions, 58 yards
Wisconsin	Passing	Colton Joseph	12/22, 173 yards, TD
Wisconsin	Rushing	Abu Sama	8 carries, 112 yards, TD
Wisconsin	Receiving	Tyrell Henry	4 receptions, 91 yards

=== Morehead State ===
Morehead State Eagles (1–2) at Western Illinois Leathernecks (1–2) – Game summary

Quarter	1	2	3	4	Total
Eagles	0	0	2	0	2
Leathernecks	14	17	14	14	59

at Hanson Field • Macomb, Illinois

- Date: September 19
- Game time: 6:00 p.m.
- TV: ESPN+

Game information

First quarter
Second quarter
Third quarter
Fourth quarter

Statistics	MORE	WIU
First downs		
Plays–yards		
Rushes–yards		
Passing yards		
Passing: comp–att–int		
Turnovers		
Time of possession		

Team	Category	Player	Statistics
Morehead State	Passing		
Morehead State	Rushing		
Morehead State	Receiving		
Western Illinois	Passing		
Western Illinois	Rushing		
Western Illinois	Receiving		

=== at North Alabama ===
Western Illinois Leathernecks (2–2) at North Alabama Lions (2–2) – Game summary

Quarter	1	2	3	4	Total
Leathernecks	0	0	0	0	0
Lions	0	0	0	0	0

at Bank Independent Stadium • Florence, Alabama

- Date: September 26
- Game time: 3:00 p.m.
- TV announcers (ESPN+): Benjamin Ray (play-by-play), Bryan Neece (analyst) and Gyvan Hammons (sideline)

Game information

First quarter
Second quarter
Third quarter
Fourth quarter

Statistics	WIU	UNA
First downs		
Plays–yards		
Rushes–yards		
Passing yards		
Passing: comp–att–int		
Turnovers		
Time of possession		

Team	Category	Player	Statistics
Western Illinois	Passing		
Western Illinois	Rushing		
Western Illinois	Receiving		
North Alabama	Passing		
North Alabama	Rushing		
North Alabama	Receiving		

=== Tennessee State ===
Tennessee State Tigers (1–3) at Western Illinois Leathernecks (2–3) – Game summary

Quarter	1	2	3	4	Total
Tigers	0	0	0	0	0
Leathernecks	0	0	0	0	0

at Hanson Field • Macomb, Illinois

- Date: October 3
- Game time: 3:00 p.m.
- TV: ESPN+

Game information

First quarter
Second quarter
Third quarter
Fourth quarter

Statistics	TNST	WIU
First downs		
Plays–yards		
Rushes–yards		
Passing yards		
Passing: comp–att–int		
Turnovers		
Time of possession		

Team	Category	Player	Statistics
Tennessee State	Passing		
Tennessee State	Rushing		
Tennessee State	Receiving		
Western Illinois	Passing		
Western Illinois	Rushing		
Western Illinois	Receiving		

=== at Southeast Missouri State ===
Western Illinois Leathernecks (3–3) at Southeast Missouri State Redhawks (3–3) – Game summary

Quarter	1	2	3	4	Total
Leathernecks	0	0	0	0	0
Redhawks	0	0	0	0	0

at Houck Stadium • Cape Girardeau, Missouri

- Date: October 17
- Game time: 1:00 p.m.

Game information

First quarter
Second quarter
Third quarter
Fourth quarter

Statistics	WIU	SEMO
First downs		
Plays–yards		
Rushes–yards		
Passing yards		
Passing: comp–att–int		
Turnovers		
Time of possession		

Team	Category	Player	Statistics
Western Illinois	Passing		
Western Illinois	Rushing		
Western Illinois	Receiving		
Southeast Missouri State	Passing		
Southeast Missouri State	Rushing		
Southeast Missouri State	Receiving		

=== UT Martin ===
UT Martin Skyhawks (3–4) at Western Illinois Leathernecks (3–4) – Game summary

Quarter	1	2	3	4	Total
Skyhawks	0	0	0	0	0
Leathernecks	0	0	0	0	0

at Hanson Field • Macomb, Illinois

- Date: October 24
- Game time: 3:00 p.m.

Game information

First quarter
Second quarter
Third quarter
Fourth quarter

Statistics	UTM	WIU
First downs		
Plays–yards		
Rushes–yards		
Passing yards		
Passing: comp–att–int		
Turnovers		
Time of possession		

Team	Category	Player	Statistics
UT Martin	Passing		
UT Martin	Rushing		
UT Martin	Receiving		
Western Illinois	Passing		
Western Illinois	Rushing		
Western Illinois	Receiving		

=== at Charleston Southern ===
Western Illinois Leathernecks (4–4) at Charleston Southern Buccaneers (4–4) – Game summary

Quarter	1	2	3	4	Total
Leathernecks	0	0	0	0	0
Buccaneers	0	0	0	0	0

at Buccaneer Field • North Charleston, South Carolina

- Date: October 31
- Game time: 1:00 p.m.

Game information

First quarter
Second quarter
Third quarter
Fourth quarter

Statistics	WIU	CHSO
First downs		
Plays–yards		
Rushes–yards		
Passing yards		
Passing: comp–att–int		
Turnovers		
Time of possession		

Team	Category	Player	Statistics
Western Illinois	Passing		
Western Illinois	Rushing		
Western Illinois	Receiving		
Charleston Southern	Passing		
Charleston Southern	Rushing		
Charleston Southern	Receiving		

=== at Eastern Illinois ===
Western Illinois Leathernecks (5–4) at Eastern Illinois Panthers (3–6) – Game summary

Quarter	1	2	3	4	Total
Leathernecks	0	0	0	0	0
Panthers	0	0	0	0	0

at O'Brien Field • Charleston, Illinois

- Date: November 7
- Game time: 2:00 p.m.

Game information

First quarter
Second quarter
Third quarter
Fourth quarter

Statistics	WIU	EIU
First downs		
Plays–yards		
Rushes–yards		
Passing yards		
Passing: comp–att–int		
Turnovers		
Time of possession		

Team	Category	Player	Statistics
Western Illinois	Passing		
Western Illinois	Rushing		
Western Illinois	Receiving		
Eastern Illinois	Passing		
Eastern Illinois	Rushing		
Eastern Illinois	Receiving		

=== Gardner–Webb ===
Gardner–Webb Runnin' Bulldogs (3–7) at Western Illinois Leathernecks (6–4) – Game summary

Quarter	1	2	3	4	Total
Runnin' Bulldogs	0	0	0	0	0
Leathernecks	0	0	0	0	0

at Hanson Field • Macomb, Illinois

- Date: November 14
- Game time: 1:00 p.m.

Game information

First quarter
Second quarter
Third quarter
Fourth quarter

Statistics	GWEB	WIU
First downs		
Plays–yards		
Rushes–yards		
Passing yards		
Passing: comp–att–int		
Turnovers		
Time of possession		

Team	Category	Player	Statistics
Gardner–Webb	Passing		
Gardner–Webb	Rushing		
Gardner–Webb	Receiving		
Western Illinois	Passing		
Western Illinois	Rushing		
Western Illinois	Receiving		

=== at Lindenwood ===
Western Illinois Leathernecks (7–4) at Lindenwood Lions (5–5) – Game summary

Quarter	1	2	3	4	Total
Leathernecks	0	0	0	0	0
Lions	0	0	0	0	0

at Harlen C. Hunter Stadium • St. Charles, Missouri

- Date: November 21
- Game time: 2:00 p.m.

Game information

First quarter
Second quarter
Third quarter
Fourth quarter

Statistics	WIU	LIN
First downs		
Plays–yards		
Rushes–yards		
Passing yards		
Passing: comp–att–int		
Turnovers		
Time of possession		

Team	Category	Player	Statistics
Western Illinois	Passing		
Western Illinois	Rushing		
Western Illinois	Receiving		
Lindenwood	Passing		
Lindenwood	Rushing		
Lindenwood	Receiving		
