= 2026 Southeast Missouri State Redhawks football team =

American college football season

2026 Southeast Missouri State Redhawks football
- Conference: Ohio Valley Conference
- Record: 7–5 (5–2 OVC)
- Head coach: Tom Matukewicz (13th season)
- Offensive coordinator: Brendan Boylan (1st season)
- Defensive coordinator: Ricky Coon (5th season)
- Home stadium: Houck Stadium

2026 Ohio Valley Conference football standings
	Conf.			Overall
Team	W		L	W		L
Western Illinois $^	6	–	1	8	–	4
UT Martin	5	–	2	6	–	6
Southeast Missouri State	5	–	2	7	–	5
Lindenwood	4	–	3	5	–	6
Eastern Illinois	3	–	4	4	–	8
Tennessee State	2	–	5	4	–	8
Gardner–Webb	2	–	5	3	–	9
Charleston Southern	1	–	6	4	–	8
$ – Conference champion; ^ – FCS playoff participant; As of November 22, 2026; Rankings from STATS Poll

The 2026 Southeast Missouri State Redhawks football team will represent Southeast Missouri State University (SEMO) as a member of the Ohio Valley Conference (OVC) during the 2026 NCAA Division I FCS football season. The Redhawks will be led by thirteenth-year head coach Tom Matukewicz and will play their home games at Houck Stadium in Cape Girardeau, Missouri.

== Schedule ==
Date	Time	Opponent	Site	TV	Result	Attendance
August 29	5:00 p.m.	at Indiana State*	Memorial Stadium; Terre Haute, IN	ESPN+	W 23–21	5,521
September 5	12:00 p.m.	at Iowa State*	Jack Trice Stadium; Ames, IA	ESPN+	L 10–38	51,802
September 12	6:00 p.m.	at Southern Illinois*	Saluki Stadium; Carbondale, IL	ESPN+	L 20–34	12,310
September 19	6:00 p.m.	Central Arkansas*	Houck Stadium; Cape Girardeau, MO	ESPN+	W 27–9	4,126
September 26	6:00 p.m.	No. 20 West Florida*	Houck Stadium; Cape Girardeau, MO	ESPN+	L 17–20	5,236
October 10	1:00 p.m.	at Lindenwood	Harlen C. Hunter Stadium; St. Charles, MO	ESPN+	W 38–27	5,008
October 17	1:00 p.m.	Western Illinois^{†}	Houck Stadium; Cape Girardeau, MO	ESPN+	W 40–30	3,276
October 24	2:00 p.m.	at Eastern Illinois	O'Brien Field; Charleston, IL	ESPN+	W 20–10	6,822
October 31	2:00 p.m.	Gardner–Webb	Houck Stadium; Cape Girardeau, MO	ESPN+	L 10–34	2,134
November 7	2:30 p.m.	at Tennessee State	Nissan Stadium; Nashville, TN	ESPN+	W 33–14	1,184
November 14	1:00 p.m.	at Charleston Southern	Buccaneer Field; North Charleston, SC	ESPN+	W 43–17	3,123
November 21	1:00 p.m.	UT Martin	Houck Stadium; Cape Girardeau, MO	ESPN+	L 47–51	3,010
*Non-conference game; ^{†}Homecoming; Rankings from STATS Poll released prior to the game; All times are in Central time

== Game summaries ==
=== at Indiana State ===
Southeast Missouri State Redhawks (0–0) at Indiana State Sycamores (0–0) – Game summary

Quarter	1	2	3	4	Total
Redhawks	7	3	7	6	23
Sycamores	0	7	7	7	21

at Memorial Stadium • Terre Haute, Indiana

- Date: August 29
- Game time: 5:00 p.m.
- Game weather: Sunny • Temperature: 83 °F (28 °C)
- Game attendance: 5,521
- Referee: Jason Perkins
- TV announcers (ESPN+): Brian Jennings and Austin Osborn

Game information

First quarter

- SEMO – Khyair Spain 8-yard run (Justin Keller kick), 3:13. Redhawks 7–0. Drive: 7 plays, 29 yards, 3:25.

Second quarter

- INST – Keshon Singleton 4-yard pass from Elijah Owens (Sebastian Lopez kick), 13:57. Tied 7–7. Drive: 9 plays, 75 yards, 4:16.
- SEMO – Justin Keller 42-yard field goal, 0:03. Redhawks 10–7. Drive: 5 plays, 10 yards, 0:42.

Third quarter

- SEMO – John Anthony Jr. 18-yard pass from Braylen Ragland (Justin Keller kick), 12:16. Redhawks 17–7. Drive: 6 plays, 58 yards, 2:38.
- INST – Ashton Hayes 1-yard run (Sebastian Lopez kick), 1:51. Redhawks 17–14. Drive: 10 plays, 84 yards, 5:48.

Fourth quarter

- SEMO – Justin Keller 43-yard field goal, 12:30. Redhawks 20–14. Drive: 9 plays, 47 yards, 4:08.
- INST – Jayden Reed 25-yard pass from Elijah Owens (Sebastian Lopez kick), 10:26. Sycamores 21–20. Drive: 6 plays, 74 yards, 1:57.
- SEMO – Justin Keller 45-yard field goal, 7:04. Redhawks 23–21. Drive: 11 plays, 48 yards, 3:22.

Statistics	SEMO	INST
First downs	18	17
Plays–yards	66–327	63–346
Rushes–yards	30–53	31–58
Passing yards	274	288
Passing: comp–att–int	26–36–0	23–32–1
Turnovers	0	1
Time of possession	28:51	31:09

Team	Category	Player	Statistics
Southeast Missouri State	Passing	Braylen Ragland	26/36, 274 yards, TD
Southeast Missouri State	Rushing	Khyair Spain	17 carries, 66 yards, TD
Southeast Missouri State	Receiving	John Anthony Jr.	6 receptions, 88 yards, TD
Indiana State	Passing	Elijah Owens	23/32, 288 yards, 2 TD, INT
Indiana State	Rushing	Aaron Ball	10 carries, 33 yards
Indiana State	Receiving	BJ Wuest	4 receptions, 67 yards

=== at Iowa State (FBS) ===
Southeast Missouri State Redhawks (1–0) at Iowa State Cyclones (FBS) (0–0) – Game summary

Quarter	1	2	3	4	Total
Redhawks	0	7	0	3	10
Cyclones (FBS)	14	14	3	7	38

at Jack Trice Stadium • Ames, Iowa

- Date: September 5
- Game time: 12:00 p.m.
- Game weather: Cloudy • Temperature: 81 °F (27 °C) • Wind: NE at 7 miles per hour (11 km/h)
- Game attendance: 51,802
- Referee: Stephen Baron
- TV announcers (ESPN+): Shawn Kenney and Todd Doxzon

Game information

First quarter

- ISU – Jaylen Raynor 7-yard run (Kyle Konrardy kick), 10:08. Cyclones 7–0. Drive: 4 plays, 56 yards, 1:35.
- ISU – Vince Benetti 24-yard pass from Jaylen Raynor (Kyle Konrardy kick), 2:27. Cyclones 14–0. Drive: 2 plays, 24 yards, 0:46.

Second quarter

- SEMO – Chance Wilson 7-yard run (Justin Keller kick), 10:39. Cyclones 14–7. Drive: 11 plays, 75 yards, 6:48.
- ISU – Aiden Flora 11-yard run (Kyle Konrardy kick), 4:54. Cyclones 21–7. Drive: 4 plays, 40 yards, 1:58.
- ISU – Easton Miller 10-yard pass from Jaylen Raynor (Kyle Konrardy kick), 2:50. Cyclones 28–7. Drive: 3 plays, 55 yards, 1:24.

Third quarter

- ISU – Kyle Konrardy 33-yard field goal, 1:47. Cyclones 31–7. Drive: 9 plays, 30 yards, 4:54.

Fourth quarter

- SEMO – Justin Keller 40-yard field goal, 13:20. Cyclones 31–10. Drive: 7 plays, 53 yards, 3:27.
- ISU – Jaylen Raynor 7-yard run (Kyle Konrardy kick), 10:41. Cyclones 38–10. Drive: 7 plays, 75 yards, 2:38.

Statistics	SEMO	ISU
First downs	14	15
Plays–yards	67–209	48–303
Rushes–yards	45–67	31–108
Passing yards	142	195
Passing: comp–att–int	17–22–1	9–17–0
Turnovers	3	1
Time of possession	36:52	23:08

Team	Category	Player	Statistics
Southeast Missouri State	Passing	Braylen Ragland	17/22, 142 yards, INT
Southeast Missouri State	Rushing	Khyair Spain	16 carries, 72 yards
Southeast Missouri State	Receiving	Jobe Bryant	7 receptions, 40 yards
Iowa State	Passing	Jaylen Raynor	8/16, 184 yards, 2 TD
Iowa State	Rushing	Aiden Flora	7 carries, 45 yards, TD
Iowa State	Receiving	Dominic Overby	2 receptions, 85 yards

=== at Southern Illinois ===
Southeast Missouri State Redhawks (1–1) at Southern Illinois Salukis (1–1) – Game summary

Quarter	1	2	3	4	Total
Redhawks	0	0	0	0	0
Salukis	0	0	0	0	0

at Saluki Stadium • Carbondale, Illinois

- Date: September 12
- Game time: 6:00 p.m.

Game information

First quarter
Second quarter
Third quarter
Fourth quarter

Statistics	SEMO	SIU
First downs		
Plays–yards		
Rushes–yards		
Passing yards		
Passing: comp–att–int		
Turnovers		
Time of possession		

Team	Category	Player	Statistics
Southeast Missouri State	Passing		
Southeast Missouri State	Rushing		
Southeast Missouri State	Receiving		
Southern Illinois	Passing		
Southern Illinois	Rushing		
Southern Illinois	Receiving		

=== Central Arkansas ===
Central Arkansas Bears (2–1) at Southeast Missouri State Redhawks (1–2) – Game summary

Quarter	1	2	3	4	Total
Bears	0	0	0	0	0
Redhawks	0	0	0	0	0

at Houck Stadium • Cape Girardeau, Missouri

- Date: September 19
- Game time: 6:00 p.m.
- TV: ESPN+

Game information

First quarter
Second quarter
Third quarter
Fourth quarter

Statistics	CARK	SEMO
First downs		
Plays–yards		
Rushes–yards		
Passing yards		
Passing: comp–att–int		
Turnovers		
Time of possession		

Team	Category	Player	Statistics
Central Arkansas	Passing		
Central Arkansas	Rushing		
Central Arkansas	Receiving		
Southeast Missouri State	Passing		
Southeast Missouri State	Rushing		
Southeast Missouri State	Receiving		

=== No. 20 West Florida ===
No. 20 West Florida Argonauts (2–1) at Southeast Missouri State Redhawks (2–2) – Game summary

Quarter	1	2	3	4	Total
No. 20 Argonauts	3	3	7	7	20
Redhawks	3	7	0	7	17

at Houck Stadium • Cape Girardeau, Missouri

- Date: September 26
- Game time: 6:00 p.m.
- Game weather: Sunny
- Game attendance: 5,236
- Referee: Branden McClain
- TV announcers (ESPN+): Erik Sean (play-by-play) and Rick Wieser (analyst)

Game information

First quarter

- SEMO – Justin Keller 42-yard field goal, 11:20. Redhawks 3–0. Drive: 7 plays, 51 yards, 3:40.
- UWF – Reid Grek 32-yard field goal, 6:57. Tied 3–3. Drive: 4 plays, 3 yards, 1:50.

Second quarter

- UWF – Reid Grek 46-yard field goal, 6:39. Argonauts 6–3. Drive: 8 plays, 44 yards, 2:36.
- SEMO – Teagan Cobb 6-yard run (Justin Keller kick), 2:35. Redhawks 10–6. Drive: 7 plays, 75 yards, 4:04.

Third quarter

- UWF – Christian Ware-Terry 5-yard fumble recovery (Reid Grek kick), 1:29. Argonauts 13–10.

Fourth quarter

- UWF – Jake Robinette 20-yard pass from Donovan Leary (Reid Grek kick), 14:52. Argonauts 20–10. Drive: 2 plays, 20 yards, 0:17.
- SEMO – Jobe Bryant 2-yard pass from Braylen Ragland (Justin Keller kick), 8:32. Argonauts 20–17. Drive: 14 plays, 75 yards, 6:20.

Statistics	UWF	SEMO
First downs	15	19
Plays–yards	58–194	72–268
Rushes–yards	22–39	47–106
Passing yards	155	162
Passing: comp–att–int	16–36–1	14–25–3
Turnovers	1	6
Time of possession	25:01	34:59

Team	Category	Player	Statistics
West Florida	Passing	Donovan Leary	16/36, 155 yards, TD, INT
West Florida	Rushing	Markel Townsend	13 carries, 31 yards
West Florida	Receiving	Tyshon Mansell	3 receptions, 43 yards
Southeast Missouri State	Passing	Braylen Ragland	14/25, 162 yards, TD, 3 INT
Southeast Missouri State	Rushing	Khyair Spain	16 carries, 77 yards
Southeast Missouri State	Receiving	Tristin Purnell	4 receptions, 80 yards

=== at Lindenwood ===
Southeast Missouri State Redhawks (2–3) at Lindenwood Lions (1–3) – Game summary

Quarter	1	2	3	4	Total
Redhawks	0	0	0	0	0
Lions	0	0	0	0	0

at Harlen C. Hunter Stadium • St. Charles, Missouri

- Date: October 10
- Game time: 1:00 p.m.

Game information

First quarter
Second quarter
Third quarter
Fourth quarter

Statistics	SEMO	LIN
First downs		
Plays–yards		
Rushes–yards		
Passing yards		
Passing: comp–att–int		
Turnovers		
Time of possession		

Team	Category	Player	Statistics
Southeast Missouri State	Passing		
Southeast Missouri State	Rushing		
Southeast Missouri State	Receiving		
Lindenwood	Passing		
Lindenwood	Rushing		
Lindenwood	Receiving		

=== Western Illinois ===
Western Illinois Leathernecks (3–3) at Southeast Missouri State Redhawks (3–3) – Game summary

Quarter	1	2	3	4	Total
Leathernecks	0	0	0	0	0
Redhawks	0	0	0	0	0

at Houck Stadium • Cape Girardeau, Missouri

- Date: October 17
- Game time: 1:00 p.m.

Game information

First quarter
Second quarter
Third quarter
Fourth quarter

Statistics	WIU	SEMO
First downs		
Plays–yards		
Rushes–yards		
Passing yards		
Passing: comp–att–int		
Turnovers		
Time of possession		

Team	Category	Player	Statistics
Western Illinois	Passing		
Western Illinois	Rushing		
Western Illinois	Receiving		
Southeast Missouri State	Passing		
Southeast Missouri State	Rushing		
Southeast Missouri State	Receiving		

=== at Eastern Illinois ===
Southeast Missouri Redhawks (4–3) at Eastern Illinois Panthers (2–5) – Game summary

Quarter	1	2	3	4	Total
Redhawks	0	0	0	0	0
Panthers	0	0	0	0	0

at O'Brien Field • Charleston, Illinois

- Date: October 24
- Game time: 2:00 p.m.

Game information

First quarter
Second quarter
Third quarter
Fourth quarter

Statistics	SEMO	EIU
First downs		
Plays–yards		
Rushes–yards		
Passing yards		
Passing: comp–att–int		
Turnovers		
Time of possession		

Team	Category	Player	Statistics
Southeast Missouri State	Passing		
Southeast Missouri State	Rushing		
Southeast Missouri State	Receiving		
Eastern Illinois	Passing		
Eastern Illinois	Rushing		
Eastern Illinois	Receiving		

=== Gardner–Webb ===
Gardner–Webb Runnin' Bulldogs (2–6) at Southeast Missouri State Redhawks (5–3) – Game summary

Quarter	1	2	3	4	Total
Runnin' Bulldogs	0	0	0	0	0
Redhawks	0	0	0	0	0

at Houck Stadium • Cape Girardeau, Missouri

- Date: October 31
- Game time: 1:00 p.m.

Game information

First quarter
Second quarter
Third quarter
Fourth quarter

Statistics	GWEB	SEMO
First downs		
Plays–yards		
Rushes–yards		
Passing yards		
Passing: comp–att–int		
Turnovers		
Time of possession		

Team	Category	Player	Statistics
Gardner–Webb	Passing		
Gardner–Webb	Rushing		
Gardner–Webb	Receiving		
Southeast Missouri State	Passing		
Southeast Missouri State	Rushing		
Southeast Missouri State	Receiving		

=== at Tennessee State ===
Southeast Missouri State Redhawks (5–4) at Tennessee State Tigers (2–7) – Game summary

Quarter	1	2	3	4	Total
Redhawks	0	0	0	0	0
Tigers	0	0	0	0	0

at Nissan Stadium • Nashville, Tennessee

- Date: November 7
- Game time: 2:30 p.m.

Game information

First quarter
Second quarter
Third quarter
Fourth quarter

Statistics	SEMO	TNST
First downs		
Plays–yards		
Rushes–yards		
Passing yards		
Passing: comp–att–int		
Turnovers		
Time of possession		

Team	Category	Player	Statistics
Southeast Missouri State	Passing		
Southeast Missouri State	Rushing		
Southeast Missouri State	Receiving		
Tennessee State	Passing		
Tennessee State	Rushing		
Tennessee State	Receiving		

=== at Charleston Southern ===
Southeast Missouri State Redhawks (6–4) at Charleston Southern Buccaneers (4–6) – Game summary

Quarter	1	2	3	4	Total
Redhawks	0	0	0	0	0
Buccaneers	0	0	0	0	0

at Buccaneer Field • North Charleston, South Carolina

- Date: November 14
- Game time: 1:00 p.m.

Game information

First quarter
Second quarter
Third quarter
Fourth quarter

Statistics	SEMO	CHSO
First downs		
Plays–yards		
Rushes–yards		
Passing yards		
Passing: comp–att–int		
Turnovers		
Time of possession		

Team	Category	Player	Statistics
Southeast Missouri State	Passing		
Southeast Missouri State	Rushing		
Southeast Missouri State	Receiving		
Charleston Southern	Passing		
Charleston Southern	Rushing		
Charleston Southern	Receiving		

=== UT Martin ===
UT Martin Skyhawks (5–6) at Southeast Missouri State Redhawks (7–4) – Game summary

Quarter	1	2	3	4	Total
Skyhawks	0	0	0	0	0
Redhawks	0	0	0	0	0

at Houck Stadium • Cape Girardeau, Missouri

- Date: November 21
- Game time: 1:00 p.m.

Game information

First quarter
Second quarter
Third quarter
Fourth quarter

Statistics	UTM	SEMO
First downs		
Plays–yards		
Rushes–yards		
Passing yards		
Passing: comp–att–int		
Turnovers		
Time of possession		

Team	Category	Player	Statistics
UT Martin	Passing		
UT Martin	Rushing		
UT Martin	Receiving		
Southeast Missouri State	Passing		
Southeast Missouri State	Rushing		
Southeast Missouri State	Receiving		

== Rankings ==
Ranking movements Legend: ██ Increase in ranking ██ Decrease in ranking — = Not ranked RV = Received votes
	Week														
Poll	Pre	1	2	3	4	5	6	7	8	9	10	11	12	13	Final
STATS	RV	RV	RV	—	RV	—	—	—	—	RV					
Coaches	RV	RV	RV	RV	RV	—	—	—	RV	RV					
