= Graham Stadium =

Stadium in Tennessee, USA

Coordinates: 36.3447°N 88.8619°W

Hardy M. Graham Stadium
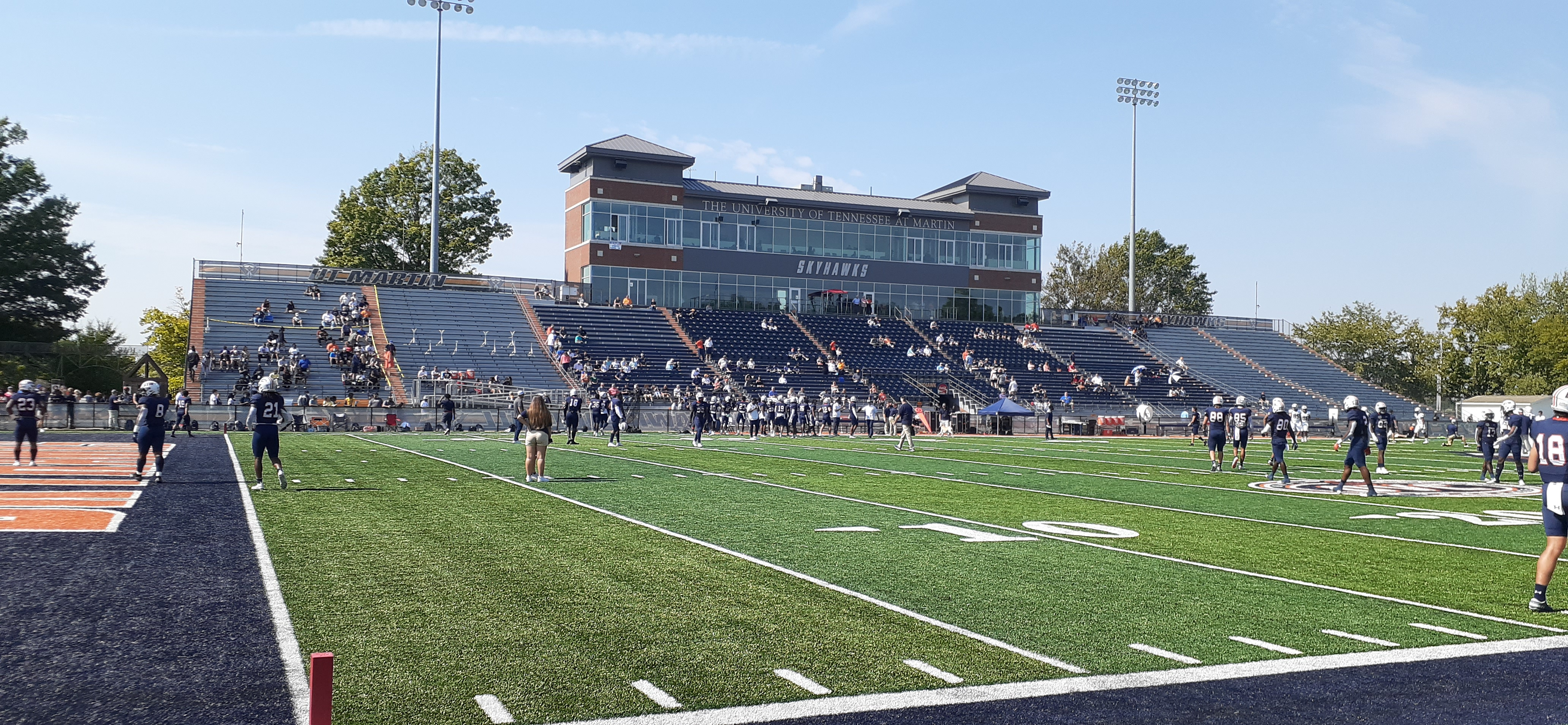
- Interactive map of Hardy M. Graham Stadium
- Location: 505 University Street, Martin, Tennessee, 38238
- Owner: University of Tennessee at Martin
- Operator: University of Tennessee at Martin
- Capacity: 7,500
- Surface: FieldTurf

Construction
- Groundbreaking: October 12, 1963
- Opened: September 26, 1964
- Renovated: 2016
- Cost: $350,000 ($3.63 million in 2025 dollars)

Tenant
- UT Martin Skyhawks (NCAA) (1964–present)

Website
- https://utmsports.com/facilities/?id=5

Hardy M. Graham Stadium is a 7,500-seat multi-purpose stadium in Martin, Tennessee. It is home to the University of Tennessee at Martin Skyhawks football team. The facility opened in 1964. It is located north of Tennessee State Route 431 (University Street, formerly Highway 22) from the central campus area, adjacent to the Ned McWherter Agricultural Complex.

== Namesake of the stadium ==
The stadium is named in honor of Hardy M. Graham, a long-time supporter of UT Martin, who has contributed over $1 million to the university. The naming of the stadium took place on July 19, 2001. Previous to this, the stadium had been referred to as Pacer Stadium after a former athletic team nickname (1971–1995). The actual playing surface is H. K. Grantham Field after a prior athletics coach at the school. The stadium is located on Everett Derryberry Lane, also named in honor of a former coach, the school's first in football.

== Facility ==
The stadium's capacity is 7,500 with nearly 1,900 chairback seats. About 1,200 are located on the east side. There are 400 chairbacks on the west side. Berms located beyond the south end zone give the stadium a "bowled" look.

The current playing surface is FieldTurf, which was installed prior to the 2008 season, replacing natural Bermuda grass.

Graham Stadium was renovated in 2016, featuring a new four-story press box on the west side of the stadium. The bottom level will house a renovated visiting locker room, referee locker room, a concession stand and other game management space. It will also feature a lobby area and an elevator. The second level is used by the College of Agriculture and Applied Science and will also serve as an academic support area. The club level is located on the third floor.

In late February 2019, the artificial grass that was installed in 2008 was repmaced. The new playing surface features alternating shades of green every five yards, the Skyhawk head logo at midfield, two navy blue endzones and a pair of orange sideline boxes.

In late August 2021, a new scoreboard and videoboard was installed by the Nevco Scoreboard Company.

== Renovations ==
The State of Tennessee provided funding to construct a modern ROTC facility on the east side of the stadium, replacing an obsolete frame building which had been moved to the central campus area after World War II. With the assistance of private and public funding, the chairback seating was added. Improvements also included complete restroom and concession facilities on the east side of the stadium, improved west side seating and press box additions.

In, 2013 it was planned that the facility undergo a $5.5 million renovation project to replace its entire west side with new bleacher seating and add a four-story building featuring a club level, academic support level, and press box that totalled approximately 21,000 square feet. The building was to stretch 50 yards—from 25-yard line to 25-yard line. The project was spearheaded by Fleming Associates out of Memphis and was approved at a Board of Trustees meeting on June 20.

In October 2014 the start of the project was delayed for the second year in a row. Work was originally planned to begin in December 2014 and was to be completed in time for the 2015 season. However, the work was actually completed in time for the 2016 season.

A University of Tennessee Capital Projects Report was published on 8/27/13 showing the Graham Stadium press box improvements coming in at $6.5 million.

== See also ==
- List of NCAA Division I FCS football stadiums
