= 2026 Western Carolina Catamounts football team =

American college football season

2026 Western Carolina Catamounts football
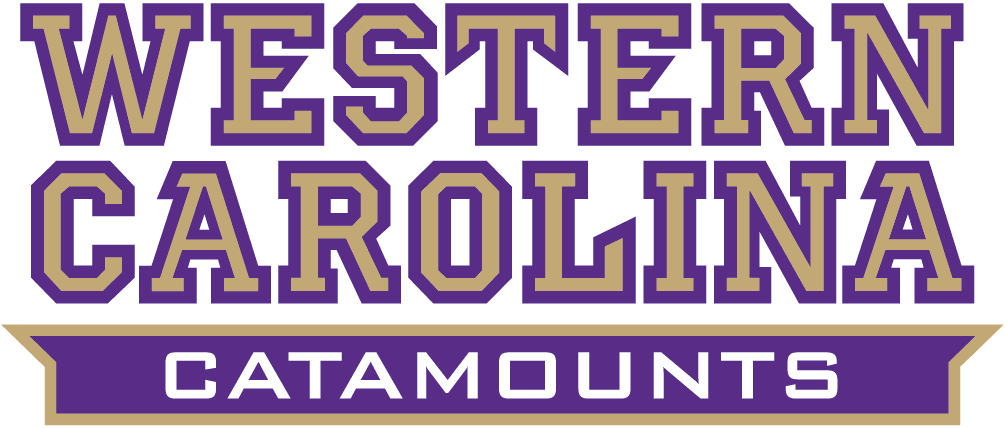
- Conference: Southern Conference
- Record: 7–5 (5–3 SoCon)
- Head coach: Kerwin Bell (6th season)
- Offensive coordinator: Rylan Wells (3rd season)
- Defensive coordinator: Nick Reveiz (1st season)
- Home stadium: Bob Waters Field at E. J. Whitmire Stadium

2026 Southern Conference football standings
	Conf.			Overall
Team	W		L	W		L
No. 9 Mercer $^	7	–	1	10	–	2
No. 13 Tennessee Tech	6	–	2	9	–	3
Chattanooga	6	–	2	7	–	5
East Tennessee State	5	–	3	7	–	5
Western Carolina	5	–	3	7	–	5
Samford	4	–	4	4	–	7
Wofford	3	–	5	5	–	7
Furman	3	–	5	4	–	8
The Citadel	1	–	7	3	–	9
VMI	0	–	8	0	–	12
$ – Conference champion; ^ – FCS playoff participant; Rankings from STATS Polldate=November 22, 2026

The 2026 Western Carolina Catamounts football team will represent Western Carolina University as a member of the Southern Conference (SoCon) during the 2026 NCAA Division I FCS football season. The Catamounts will be led by sixth-year head coach Kerwin Bell and will play their home games at Bob Waters Field at E. J. Whitmire Stadium in Cullowhee, North Carolina.

== Schedule ==
Date	Time	Opponent	Rank	Site	TV	Result	Attendance
August 29	7:00 p.m.	Eastern Kentucky*		Bob Waters Field at E. J. Whitmire Stadium; Cullowhee, NC	ESPN+	W 45–21	13,482
September 6	11:00 a.m.	at Campbell*	No. 24	Barker–Lane Stadium; Buies Creek, NC	FloFootball	L 19–28	4,212
September 12	7:00 p.m.	at Cincinnati*		Nippert Stadium; Cincinnati, OH	ESPN+	L 10–62	34,827
September 19	2:30 p.m.	Presbyterian*		Bob Waters Field at E. J. Whitmire Stadium; Cullowhee, NC	ESPN+	W 58–14	11,811
September 26	3:30 p.m.	at East Tennessee State		William B. Greene Jr. Stadium; Johnson City, TN	ESPN+	L 31–58	9,204
October 3	6:00 p.m.	No. 9 Tennessee Tech		Bob Waters Field at E. J. Whitmire Stadium; Cullowhee, NC	ESPN+	W 44–20	9,145
October 10	3:00 p.m.	at No. 20 Mercer		Five Star Stadium; Macon, GA	ESPN+	L 14–17	3,139
October 24	2:30 p.m.	Chattanooga^{†}		Bob Waters Field at E. J. Whitmire Stadium; Cullowhee, NC	ESPN+	L 18–41	11,889
October 31	2:00 p.m.	at Furman		Paladin Stadium; Greenville, SC	ESPN+	W 27–26	7,237
November 7	1:00 p.m.	Wofford		Bob Waters Field at E. J. Whitmire Stadium; Cullowhee, NC	ESPN+	W 26–10	9,524
November 14	3:30 p.m.	at Samford		Pete Hanna Stadium; Homewood, AL	ESPN+	W 17–12	5,713
November 21	1:00 p.m.	The Citadel		Bob Waters Field at E. J. Whitmire Stadium; Cullowhee, NC	ESPN+	W 38–23	10,001
*Non-conference game; ^{†}Homecoming; Rankings from STATS Poll released prior to the game; All times are in Eastern time

== Game summaries ==
=== Eastern Kentucky ===
Eastern Kentucky Colonels (0–0) at Western Carolina Catamounts (0–0) – Game summary

Quarter	1	2	3	4	Total
Colonels	7	7	7	0	21
Catamounts	7	3	21	14	45

at E. J. Whitmire Stadium • Cullowhee, North Carolina

- Date: August 29
- Game time: 7:00 p.m.
- Game weather: Sunny • Temperature: 74 °F (23 °C) • Wind: SE at 3 miles per hour (4.8 km/h)
- Game attendance: 13,482
- Referee: Jake Grombach
- TV announcers (ESPN+): Daniel Hooker and John Brannon III

Game information

First quarter

- EKU – Elijah Caldwell 18-yard pass from Tyler Travers (Buzz Flabiano kick), 9:38. Colonels 7–0. Drive: 10 plays, 75 yards, 5:22.
- WCU – Marlin Cochran 34-yard run (Bryan McCollum kick), 0:15. Tied 7–7. Drive: 7 plays, 89 yards, 3:08.

Second quarter

- EKU – Brayden Latham 9-yard pass from Tyler Travers (Buzz Flabiano kick), 1:57. Colonels 14–7. Drive: 12 plays, 81 yards, 6:28.
- WCU – Bryan McCollum 20-yard field goal, 0:00. Colonels 14–10. Drive: 8 plays, 39 yards, 1:48.

Third quarter

- WCU – Bode Burns 18-yard pass from Lex Thomas (Bryan McCollum kick), 12:47. Catamounts 17–14. Drive: 6 plays, 75 yards, 2:13.
- WCU – Josh Perry 12-yard pass from Lex Thomas (Bryan McCollum kick), 8:31. Catamounts 24–14. Drive: 6 plays, 60 yards, 2:50.
- WCU – Josh Perry 6-yard pass from Lex Thomas (Bryan McCollum kick), 3:38. Catamounts 31–14. Drive: 7 plays, 50 yards, 2:27.
- EKU – Jarvis Hayes 15-yard pass from Tyler Travers (Buzz Flabiano kick), 0:37. Catamounts 31–21. Drive: 7 plays, 75 yards, 3:01.

Fourth quarter

- WCU – Lex Thomas 15-yard run (Bryan McCollum kick), 2:27. Catamounts 38–21. Drive: 5 plays, 53 yards, 0:56.
- WCU – Anthony Benjamin 14-yard run (Bryan McCollum kick), 0:47. Catamounts 45–21. Drive: 3 plays, 26 yards, 0:49.

Statistics	EKU	WCU
First downs	20	28
Plays–yards	63–370	75–508
Rushes–yards	29–65	40–188
Passing yards	305	320
Passing: comp–att–int	22–34–1	27–35–0
Turnovers	2	0
Time of possession	27:45	32:15

Team	Category	Player	Statistics
Eastern Kentucky	Passing	Tyler Travers	22/34, 305 yards, 3 TD, INT
Eastern Kentucky	Rushing	Brayden Latham	16 carries, 41 yards
Eastern Kentucky	Receiving	Elijah Caldwell	6 receptions, 102 yards, TD
Western Carolina	Passing	Lex Thomas	27/35, 320 yards, 3 TD
Western Carolina	Rushing	Lex Thomas	14 carries, 69 yards, TD
Western Carolina	Receiving	Michael Rossin	6 receptions, 94 yards

=== at Campbell ===
No. 24 Western Carolina Catamounts (1–0) at Campbell Fighting Camels (1–0) – Game summary

Quarter	1	2	3	4	Total
No. 24 Catamounts	0	10	3	6	19
Fighting Camels	14	14	0	0	28

at Barker–Lane Stadium • Buies Creek, North Carolina

- Date: September 6
- Game time: 10:00 a.m.
- Game weather: Sunny • Temperature: 80 °F (27 °C) • Wind: SW at 8 miles per hour (13 km/h)
- Game attendance: 4,212
- Referee: Justin Ackley
- TV: FloFootball

Game information

First quarter

- CAM – Brady Ambrose 6-yard pass from Kamden Sixkiller (Alex Crabb kick), 9:25. Fighting Camels 7–0. Drive: 10 plays, 91 yards, 5:29.
- CAM – Kamden Sixkiller 8-yard run (Alex Crabb kick), 4:00. Fighting Camels 14–0. Drive: 7 plays, 53 yards, 3:28.

Second quarter

- WCU – Bryan McCollum 23-yard field goal, 14:49. Fighting Camels 14–3. Drive: 7 plays, 39 yards, 2:02.
- CAM – Ethan Lawrence 1-yard run (Alex Crabb kick), 10:17. Fighting Camels 21–3. Drive: 5 plays, 64 yards, 1:21.
- WCU – Jai Boyd 48-yard pass from Lex Thomas (Bryan McCollum kick), 2:57. Fighting Camels 21–10. Drive: 7 plays, 73 yards, 3:11.
- CAM – Spencer Jones 32-yard pass from Kamden Sixkiller (Alex Crabb kick), 0:18. Fighting Camels 28–10. Drive: 5 plays, 82 yards, 0:30.

Third quarter

- WCU – Bryan McCollum 40-yard field goal, 9:49. Fighting Camels 28–13. Drive: 4 plays, -14 yards, 1:57.

Fourth quarter

- WCU – Jai Boyd 1-yard pass from Lex Thomas (Bryan McCollum kick failed), 9:24. Fighting Camels 28–19. Drive: 11 plays, 65 yards, 3:16.

Statistics	WCU	CAM
First downs	16	26
Plays–yards	62–327	83–528
Rushes–yards	18–1	39–198
Passing yards	326	330
Passing: comp–att–int	25–44–0	29–44–3
Turnovers	0	3
Time of possession	23:58	36:02

Team	Category	Player	Statistics
Western Carolina	Passing	Lex Thomas	25/44, 326 yards, 2 TD
Western Carolina	Rushing	Derrick Davis Jr.	3 carries, 6 yards
Western Carolina	Receiving	AJ Colombo	6 receptions, 91 yards
Campbell	Passing	Kamden Sixkiller	29/44, 330 yards, 2 TD, 3 INT
Campbell	Rushing	JJ Cowan	11 carries, 83 yards
Campbell	Receiving	Spencer Jones	7 receptions, 126 yards, TD

=== at Cincinnati (FBS) ===
Western Carolina Catamounts (1–1) at Cincinnati Bearcats (FBS) (1–0) – Game summary

Quarter	1	2	3	4	Total
Catamounts	3	7	0	0	10
Bearcats (FBS)	7	21	21	13	62

at Nippert Stadium • Cincinnati, Ohio

- Date: September 12
- Game time: 7:00 p.m.
- Game weather: Cloudy • Temperature: 77 °F (25 °C) • Wind: SW at 3 miles per hour (4.8 km/h)
- Game attendance: 34,827
- Referee: Lyndon Nixon
- TV announcers (ESPN+): Kevin Fitzgerald and Todd Doxzon

Game information

First quarter

- WCU – Bryan McCollum 33-yard field goal, 8:57. Catamounts 3–0. Drive: 12 plays, 60 yards, 6:03.
- CIN – JV Gibson 5-yard pass from JC French IV (Stephen Rusnak kick), 3:34. Bearcats 7–3. Drive: 13 plays, 75 yards, 5:23.

Second quarter

- CIN – Lyviel Waters 2-yard pass from JC French IV (Stephen Rusnak kick), 12:35. Bearcats 14–3. Drive: 12 plays, 75 yards, 4:30.
- WCU – Lex Thomas 1-yard run (Bryan McCollum kick), 6:23. Bearcats 14–10. Drive: 11 plays, 75 yards, 6:12.
- CIN – Cole Tabb 36-yard run (Stephen Rusnak kick), 3:00. Bearcats 21–10. Drive: 7 plays, 81 yards, 3:18.
- CIN – Zion Johnson 3-yard run (Stephen Rusnak kick), 0:38. Bearcats 28–10. Drive: 6 plays, 85 yards, 1:06.

Third quarter

- CIN – Gi'Bran Payne 40-yard run (Stephen Rusnak kick), 9:10. Bearcats 35–10. Drive: 2 plays, 49 yards, 0:32.
- CIN – Gi'Bran Payne 17-yard run (Stephen Rusnak kick), 5:03. Bearcats 42–10. Drive: 3 plays, 73 yards, 0:47.
- CIN – Zylan Perry 40-yard run (Stephen Rusnak kick), 2:02. Bearcats 49–10. Drive: 3 plays, 61 yards, 1:30.

Fourth quarter

- CIN – Liam O'Brien 11-yard run (Max Lemasters kick failed), 11:51. Bearcats 55–10. Drive: 8 plays, 59 yards, 3:10.
- CIN – Samaj Jones 4-yard run (Stephen Rusnak kick), 0:43. Bearcats 62–10. Drive: 12 plays, 57 yards, 5:12.

Statistics	WCU	CIN
First downs	13	32
Plays–yards	57–241	80–690
Rushes–yards	20–74	49–418
Passing yards	167	272
Passing: comp–att–int	24–37–1	28–31–0
Turnovers	1	0
Time of possession	27:23	32:37

Team	Category	Player	Statistics
Western Carolina	Passing	Lex Thomas	23/32, 165 yards
Western Carolina	Rushing	Marlin Cochran	3 carries, 25 yards
Western Carolina	Receiving	Jake Young	5 receptions, 49 yards
Cincinnati	Passing	JC French IV	21/24, 245 yards, 2 TD
Cincinnati	Rushing	Gi'Bran Payne	12 carries, 102 yards, 2 TD
Cincinnati	Receiving	Malachi Henry	3 receptions, 87 yards

=== Presbyterian ===
Presbyterian Blue Hose (1–1) at Western Carolina Catamounts (1–2) – Game summary

Quarter	1	2	3	4	Total
Blue Hose	0	0	0	0	0
Catamounts	0	0	0	0	0

at E. J. Whitmire Stadium • Cullowhee, North Carolina

- Date: September 19
- Game time: 2:30 p.m.
- TV: ESPN+

Game information

First quarter
Second quarter
Third quarter
Fourth quarter

Statistics	PRES	WCU
First downs		
Plays–yards		
Rushes–yards		
Passing yards		
Passing: comp–att–int		
Turnovers		
Time of possession		

Team	Category	Player	Statistics
Presbyterian	Passing		
Presbyterian	Rushing		
Presbyterian	Receiving		
Western Carolina	Passing		
Western Carolina	Rushing		
Western Carolina	Receiving		

=== at East Tennessee State ===
Western Carolina Catamounts (2–2) at East Tennessee State Buccaneers (2–2) – Game summary

Quarter	1	2	3	4	Total
Catamounts	0	7	7	17	31
Buccaneers	14	20	10	14	58

at William B. Greene Jr. Stadium • Johnson City, Tennessee

- Date: September 26
- Game time: 3:30 p.m.
- Game weather: Sunny • Temperature: 73 °F (23 °C) • Wind: S at 4 miles per hour (6.4 km/h)
- Game attendance: 9,204
- Referee: Michael Gervais
- TV announcers (ESPN+): Pete Yanity (play-by-play), Jeremy Greene (analyst), Dave Friedman (sideline reporter)

Game information

First quarter

- (5:35) ETSU – D'Marius Rucker 2-yard run, Ewan Johnson kick (Drive: 16 plays, 63 yards, 6:50; Buccaneers 7–0)
- (0:02) ETSU – Jason Albritton 2-yard run, Ewan Johnson kick (Drive: 10 plays, 48 yards, 3:58; Buccaneers 14–0)

Second quarter

- (10:36) ETSU – Ewan Johnson 33-yard field goal (Drive: 8 plays, 57 yards, 3:42; Buccaneers 17–0)
- (6:05) ETSU – Jason Albritton 3-yard run, Ewan Johnson kick (Drive: 6 plays, 53 yards, 1:56; Buccaneers 24–0)
- (1:54) ETSU – Ewan Johnson 49-yard field goal (Drive: 6 plays, 29 yards, 2:15; Buccaneers 27–0)
- (1:11) WCU – Lex Thomas 37-yard run, Bryan McCollum kick (Drive: 6 plays, 75 yards, 0:43; Buccaneers 27–7)
- (0:32) ETSU – Charlie Browder 12-yard pass from Mason Mims, Ewan Johnson (Drive: 4 plays, 73 yards, 0:32; Buccaneers 34–7)

Third quarter

- (11:22) ETSU – Ewan Johnson 43-yard field goal (Drive: 9 plays, 49 yards, 3:38; Buccaneers 37–7)
- (8:50) ETSU – TJ Peyton 1-yard run, Ewan Johnson kick (Drive: 4 plays, 34 yards, 1:09; Buccaneers 44–7)
- (3:00) WCU – Lex Thomas 5-yard run, Bryan McCollum kick (Drive: 12 plays, 65 yards, 5:00; Buccaneers 44–14)

Fourth quarter

- (14:07) WCU – Bryan McCollum 26-yard field goal (Drive: 8 plays, 34 yards, 2:06; Buccaneers 44–17)
- (11:29) ETSU – Jason Albritton 3-yard run, Ewan Johnson kick (Drive: 5 plays, 46 yards, 2:33; Buccaneers 51–17)
- (6:33) WCU – Lex Thomas 10-yard run, Bryan McCollum kick (Drive: 15 plays, 82 yards, 4:50; Buccaneers 51–24)
- (4:10) ETSU – Jaiden Daniels 1-yard run, Ewan Johnson kick (Drive: 5 plays, 75 yards, 2:23; Buccaneers 58–24)
- (0:19) WCU – Carlos Santana 8-yard pass from Patrick Harding, Bryan McCollum kick (Drive: 14 plays, 75 yards, 3:51; Buccaneers 58–31)

Statistics	WCU	ETSU
First downs	23	27
Plays–yards	76–368	74–542
Rushes–yards	38–181	43–233
Passing yards	187	309
Passing: comp–att–int	20–38–0	24–31–0
Turnovers	0	0
Time of possession	28:46	31:14

Team	Category	Player	Statistics
Western Carolina	Passing	Lex Thomas	16/32, 163 yards
Western Carolina	Rushing	Lex Thomas	11 carries, 52 yards, 3 TD
Western Carolina	Receiving	AJ Colombo	5 receptions, 60 yards
East Tennessee State	Passing	Mason Mims	20/27, 220 yards, TD
East Tennessee State	Rushing	TJ Peyton	16 carries, 102 yards, TD
East Tennessee State	Receiving	Trey Weary	4 receptions, 60 yards

=== No. 9 Tennessee Tech ===
No. 9 Tennessee Tech Golden Eagles (4–0) at Western Carolina Catamounts (2–3) – Game summary

Quarter	1	2	3	4	Total
No. 9 Golden Eagles	0	17	3	0	20
Catamounts	10	10	10	14	44

at E. J. Whitmire Stadium • Cullowhee, North Carolina

- Date: October 3
- Game time: 6:00 p.m.
- Game weather: Cloudy • Temperature: 75 °F (24 °C) • Wind: SW at 2 miles per hour (3.2 km/h)
- Game attendance: 9,145
- Referee: Jeff Page
- TV announcers (ESPN+): Pete Yanity (play-by-play), Cole Neely (analyst) and Dave Friedman (sideline)

Game information

First quarter

- WCU - Bryan McCollum 25-yard field goal, 6:42. Catamounts 3–0. Drive: 13 plays, 84 yards, 5:23.
- WCU - Jordan Martin-Durham 1-yard run (Bryan McCollum kick), 1:44. Catamounts 10–0. Drive: 9 plays, 63 yards, 3:33.

Second quarter

- WCU - Jai Boyd 49-yard pass from Lex Thomas (Bryan McCollum kick), 12:11. Catamounts 17–0. Drive: 8 plays, 80 yards, 1:28.
- TNTC - Gabe Nunez 18-yard pass from Jax Leatherwood (Carter Brown kick), 10:43. Catamounts 17–7. Drive: 4 plays, 65 yards, 1:28.
- WCU - Bryan McCollum 39-yard field goal, 7:26. Catamounta 20–7. Drive: 9 plays, 44 yards, 3:17.
- TNTC - Eric Weatherly 4-yard pass from Jax Leatherwood (Carter Brown kick), 4:32. Catamounts 20–14. Drive: 8 plays, 75 yards, 2:54.
- TNTC - Carter Brown 50-yard field goal, 0:03. Catamounts 20–17. Drive: 6 plays, 30 yards, 1:10.

Third quarter

- WCU - Josh Perry 35-yard run (Bryan McCollum kick), 10:40. Catamounts 27–17. Drive: 9 plays, 45 yards, 4:12.
- TNTC - Carter Brown 30-yard field goal, 3:09. Catamounts 27–20. Drive: 7 plays, 33 yards, 2:02.
- WCU - Bryan McCollum 29-yard field goal, 0:05. Catamounts 30–20. Drive: 4 plays, 7 yards, 2:02.

Fourth quarter

- WCU - Josh Perry 13-yard run (Bryan McCollum kick), 14:22. Catamounts 37–20. Drive: 1 play, -5 yards, 0:38.
- WCU - Jordan Martin-Durham 1-yard run (Bryan McCollum kick), 1:03. Catamounts 44–22. Drive 14 plays, 53 yards, 6:41.

Statistics	TNTC	WCU
First downs	21	28
Plays–yards	61–395	91–534
Rushes–yards	15–53	61–298
Passing yards	342	236
Passing: comp–att–int	24–46–1	19–30–0
Turnovers	5	1
Time of possession	20:46	39:14

Team	Category	Player	Statistics
Tennessee Tech	Passing	Jax Leatherwood	26/46, 342 yards, 2 TD, INT
Tennessee Tech	Rushing	M.J. Flowers	5 carries, 29 yards
Tennessee Tech	Receiving	Greg Nunez	13 receptions, 225 yards, TD
Western Carolina	Passing	Lex Thomas	19/30, 236 yards, TD
Western Carolina	Rushing	Josh Perry	25 carries, 157 yards, 2 TD
Western Carolina	Receiving	AJ Colombo	6 receptions, 60 yards

=== at No. 20 Mercer ===
Western Carolina Catamounts (3–3) at No. 20 Mercer Bears (4–2) – Game summary

Quarter	1	2	3	4	Total
Catamounts	0	0	0	0	0
No. 20 Bears	0	0	0	0	0

at Five Star Stadium • Macon, Georgia

- Date: October 10
- Game time: 3:00 p.m.

Game information

First quarter
Second quarter
Third quarter
Fourth quarter

Statistics	WCU	MER
First downs		
Plays–yards		
Rushes–yards		
Passing yards		
Passing: comp–att–int		
Turnovers		
Time of possession		

Team	Category	Player	Statistics
Western Carolina	Passing		
Western Carolina	Rushing		
Western Carolina	Receiving		
Mercer	Passing		
Mercer	Rushing		
Mercer	Receiving		

=== Chattanooga ===
Chattanooga Mocs (4–3) at Western Carolina Catamounts (3–4) – Game summary

Quarter	1	2	3	4	Total
Mocs	0	0	0	0	0
Catamounts	0	0	0	0	0

at E. J. Whitmire Stadium • Cullowhee, North Carolina

- Date: October 24
- Game time: 2:30 p.m.

Game information

First quarter
Second quarter
Third quarter
Fourth quarter

Statistics	UTC	WCU
First downs		
Plays–yards		
Rushes–yards		
Passing yards		
Passing: comp–att–int		
Turnovers		
Time of possession		

Team	Category	Player	Statistics
Chattanooga	Passing		
Chattanooga	Rushing		
Chattanooga	Receiving		
Western Carolina	Passing		
Western Carolina	Rushing		
Western Carolina	Receiving		

=== at Furman ===
Western Carolina Catamounts (3–5) at Furman Paladins (2–6) – Game summary

Quarter	1	2	3	4	Total
Catamounts	0	0	0	0	0
Paladins	0	0	0	0	0

at Paladin Stadium • Greenville, South Carolina

- Date: October 21
- Game time: 2:00 p.m.

Game information

First quarter
Second quarter
Third quarter
Fourth quarter

Statistics	WCU	FUR
First downs		
Plays–yards		
Rushes–yards		
Passing yards		
Passing: comp–att–int		
Turnovers		
Time of possession		

Team	Category	Player	Statistics
Western Carolina	Passing		
Western Carolina	Rushing		
Western Carolina	Receiving		
Furman	Passing		
Furman	Rushing		
Furman	Receiving		

=== Wofford ===
Wofford Terriers (5–4) at Western Carolina Catamounts (4–5) – Game summary

Quarter	1	2	3	4	Total
Terriers	0	0	0	0	0
Catamounts	0	0	0	0	0

at E. J. Whitmire Stadium • Cullowhee, North Carolina

- Date: November 7
- Game time: 1:00 p.m.

Game information

First quarter
Second quarter
Third quarter
Fourth quarter

Statistics	WOF	WCU
First downs		
Plays–yards		
Rushes–yards		
Passing yards		
Passing: comp–att–int		
Turnovers		
Time of possession		

Team	Category	Player	Statistics
Wofford	Passing		
Wofford	Rushing		
Wofford	Receiving		
Western Carolina	Passing		
Western Carolina	Rushing		
Western Carolina	Receiving		

=== at Samford ===
Western Carolina Catamounts (5–5) at Samford Bulldogs (4–6) – Game summary

Quarter	1	2	3	4	Total
Catamounts	0	0	0	0	0
Bulldogs	0	0	0	0	0

at Pete Hanna Stadium • Homewood, Alabama

- Date: November 14
- Game time: 3:30 p.m.

Game information

First quarter
Second quarter
Third quarter
Fourth quarter

Statistics	WCU	SAM
First downs		
Plays–yards		
Rushes–yards		
Passing yards		
Passing: comp–att–int		
Turnovers		
Time of possession		

Team	Category	Player	Statistics
Western Carolina	Passing		
Western Carolina	Rushing		
Western Carolina	Receiving		
Samford	Passing		
Samford	Rushing		
Samford	Receiving		

=== The Citadel ===
The Citadel Bulldogs (3–8) at Western Carolina Catamounts (6–5) – Game summary

Quarter	1	2	3	4	Total
Bulldogs	0	0	0	0	0
Catamounts	0	0	0	0	0

at E. J. Whitmire Stadium • Cullowhee, North Carolina

- Date: November 21
- Game time: 1:00 p.m.

Game information

First quarter
Second quarter
Third quarter
Fourth quarter

Statistics	CIT	WCU
First downs		
Plays–yards		
Rushes–yards		
Passing yards		
Passing: comp–att–int		
Turnovers		
Time of possession		

Team	Category	Player	Statistics
The Citadel	Passing		
The Citadel	Rushing		
The Citadel	Receiving		
Western Carolina	Passing		
Western Carolina	Rushing		
Western Carolina	Receiving		

== Rankings ==
Ranking movements Legend: ██ Increase in ranking ██ Decrease in ranking — = Not ranked RV = Received votes
	Week														
Poll	Pre	1	2	3	4	5	6	7	8	9	10	11	12	13	Final
STATS	RV	24	RV	—	—	—	RV								
Coaches	RV	RV	RV	—	—	—	—								
