= 2026 Chattanooga Mocs football team =

American college football season

2026 Chattanooga Mocs football
- Conference: Southern Conference
- Record: 7–5 (6–2 SoCon)
- Head coach: Rusty Wright (8th season)
- Offensive coordinator: Joe Pizzo (8th season)
- Defensive coordinator: Mike Yeager (3rd season)
- Home stadium: Finley Stadium

2026 Southern Conference football standings
	Conf.			Overall
Team	W		L	W		L
No. 9 Mercer $^	7	–	1	10	–	2
No. 13 Tennessee Tech	6	–	2	9	–	3
Chattanooga	6	–	2	7	–	5
East Tennessee State	5	–	3	7	–	5
Western Carolina	5	–	3	7	–	5
Samford	4	–	4	4	–	7
Wofford	3	–	5	5	–	7
Furman	3	–	5	4	–	8
The Citadel	1	–	7	3	–	9
VMI	0	–	8	0	–	12
$ – Conference champion; ^ – FCS playoff participant; Rankings from STATS Polldate=November 22, 2026

The 2026 Chattanooga Mocs football team will represent the University of Tennessee at Chattanooga as a member of the Southern Conference (SoCon) during the 2026 NCAA Division I FCS football season. The Mocs will be led by eighth-year head coach Rusty Wright and will play their home games at Finley Stadium in Chattanooga, Tennessee.

== Schedule ==
Date	Time	Opponent	Rank	Site	TV	Result	Attendance
August 27	7:00 p.m.	at West Georgia*		University Stadium; Carrollton, GA	ESPN+	W 24–10	5,237
September 5	6:00 p.m.	No. 12 Tennessee Tech (Note: The game against Tennessee Tech, a fellow member of the Southern Conference, is a non-conference game and not count in the league standings.)*		Finley Stadium; Chattanooga, TN	ESPN+	L 9–24	6,869
September 12	6:00 p.m.	at Eastern Kentucky*		Roy Kidd Stadium; Richmond, KY	ESPN+	L 17–22	4,588
September 19	6:00 p.m.	Wofford		Finley Stadium; Chattanooga, TN	ESPN+	W 41–7	7,205
September 26	2:00 p.m.	at The Citadel		Johnson Hagood Stadium; Charleston, SC	ESPN+	W 27–8	8,381
October 3	3:30 p.m.	at East Tennessee State		William B. Greene Jr. Stadium; Johnson City, TN	ESPN+	L 3–14	7,103
October 10	1:00 p.m.	Samford		Finley Stadium; Chattanooga, TN	ESPN+	W 19–3	3,308
October 24	2:30 p.m.	at Western Carolina		E. J. Whitmire Stadium; Cullowhee, NC	ESPN+	W 41–18	11,889
October 31	1:00 p.m.	VMI		Finley Stadium; Chattanooga, TN	ESPN+	W 24–10	5,554
November 7	1:00 p.m.	No. 14 Mercer^{†}	No. 25	Finley Stadium; Chattanooga, TN	ESPN+	L 7–14 ^{OT}	8,810
November 14	1:00 p.m.	at Furman		Paladin Stadium; Greenville, SC	ESPN+	W 17–10	7,207
November 21	2:00 p.m.	at No. 3 (FBS) Alabama*		Bryant–Denny Stadium; Tuscaloosa, AL	SECN+	L 0–47	98,552
*Non-conference game; ^{†}Homecoming; Rankings from STATS Poll released prior to the game; All times are in Eastern time

== Game summaries ==
=== at West Georgia ===
Chattanooga Mocs (0–0) at West Georgia Wolves (0–0) – Game summary

Quarter	1	2	3	4	Total
Mocs	0	3	14	7	24
Wolves	0	7	3	0	10

at University Stadium • Carrollton, Georgia

- Date: August 27
- Game time: 7:00 p.m.
- Game weather: Cloudy • Temperature: 82 °F (28 °C)
- Game attendance: 5,237
- Referee: Drew Myers
- TV announcers (ESPN+): Patrick Aldson and Alvin Delve

Game information

First quarter

- No scoring plays.

Second quarter

- UWG – Christian Monfort 1-yard run (Freddy Perez kick), 7:46. Wolves 7–0. Drive: 7 plays, 78 yards, 3:04.
- UTC – Jude Kelley 39-yard field goal, 0:00. Wolves 7–3. Drive: 13 plays, 26 yards, 3:50.

Third quarter

- UTC – Ashton Schumann 72-yard pass from Battle Alberson (Jude Kelley kick), 14:16. Mocs 10–7. Drive: 2 plays, 75 yards, 0:44.
- UWG – Freddy Perez 43-yard field goal, 12:50. Tied 10–10. Drive: 5 plays, 50 yards, 1:26.
- UTC – Boobie Leavell 20-yard pass from Battle Alberson (Jude Kelley kick), 12:47. Mocs 17–10. Drive: 8 plays, 71 yards, 4:25.

Fourth quarter

- UTC – Kevin Lalin 6-yard run (Jude Kelley kick), 9:53. Mocs 24–10. Drive: 9 plays, 52 yards, 4:57.

Statistics	UTC	UWG
First downs	20	12
Plays–yards	69–329	50–219
Rushes–yards	51–149	19–38
Passing yards	180	181
Passing: comp–att–int	9–18–0	20–31–0
Turnovers	0	0
Time of possession	36:43	23:17

Team	Category	Player	Statistics
Chattanooga	Passing	Battle Alberson	9/17, 180 yards, 2 TD
Chattanooga	Rushing	Kevin Lalin	30 carries, 128 yards, TD
Chattanooga	Receiving	Ashton Schumann	4 receptions, 100 yards, TD
West Georgia	Passing	Collin Hurst	19/30, 124 yards
West Georgia	Rushing	Justin Montgomery	8 receptions, 31 yards
West Georgia	Receiving	Josh Schuchts	1 reception, 57 yards

=== No. 12 Tennessee Tech ===
No. 12 Tennessee Tech Golden Eagles (1–0) at Chattanooga Mocs (1–0) – Game summary

Quarter	1	2	3	4	Total
No. 12 Golden Eagles	0	7	10	7	24
Mocs	3	3	0	3	9

at Finley Stadium • Chattanooga, Tennessee

- Date: September 5
- Game time: 6:00 p.m.
- Game weather: Sunny • Temperature: 92 °F (33 °C) • Wind: SE at 5 miles per hour (8.0 km/h)
- Game attendance: 6,869
- Referee: Brian Hilpisch
- TV announcers (ESPN+): Pete Yanity (play-by-play), Cole Neely (analyst) and Dave Friedman (sideline)

Game information

First quarter

- UTC – Jude Kelley 22-yard field goal, 1:00. Mocs 3–0. Drive: 8 plays, 46 yards, 4:48.

Second quarter

- TNTC – Marcus Harris II 1-yard run (Carter Brown kick), 1:16. Golden Eagles 7–3. Drive: 8 plays, 45 yards, 3:21.
- UTC – Jude Kelley 33-yard field goal, 0:00. Golden Eagles 7–6. Drive: 6 plays, 59 yards, 1:11.

Third quarter

- TNTC – Carter Brown 50-yard field goal, 6:58. Golden Eagles 10–6. Drive: 13 plays, 48 yards, 5:36.
- TNTC – Maury Sullivan 16-yard pass from Jax Leatherwood (Carter Brown kick), 1:01. Golden Eagles 17–6. Drive: 3 plays, 43 yards, 1:11.

Fourth quarter

- UTC – Jude Kelley 39-yard field goal, 8:32. Golden Eagles 17–9. Drive: 8 plays, 59 yards, 4:00.
- TNTC – Gabe Nunez 11-yard pass from Jax Leatherwood (Carter Brown kick), 2:44. Golden Eagles 24–9. Drive: 10 plays, 75 yards, 5:48.

Statistics	TNTC	UTC
First downs	13	13
Plays–yards	61–237	51–227
Rushes–yards	29–76	35–190
Passing yards	161	37
Passing: comp–att–int	19–32–1	6–16–2
Turnovers	1	2
Time of possession	35:05	24:55

Team	Category	Player	Statistics
Tennessee Tech	Passing	Jax Leatherwood	19/32, 161 yards, 2 TD, INT
Tennessee Tech	Rushing	M.J. Flowers	9 carries, 50 yards
Tennessee Tech	Receiving	Maury Sullivan	5 receptions, 68 yards, TD
Chattanooga	Passing	Battle Alberson	6/16, 37 yards, 2 INT
Chattanooga	Rushing	Journey Wyche	12 carries, 113 yards
Chattanooga	Receiving	Erik Bussmann	3 receptions, 17 yards

=== at Eastern Kentucky ===
Chattanooga Mocs (1–1) at Eastern Kentucky Colonels (0–2) – Game summary

Quarter	1	2	3	4	Total
Mocs	0	3	14	0	17
Colonels	6	10	0	6	22

at Roy Kidd Stadium • Richmond, Kentucky

- Date: September 12
- Game time: 6:00 p.m.
- Game weather: Cloudy • Temperature: 83 °F (28 °C) • Wind: NE at 7 miles per hour (11 km/h)
- Game attendance: 4,588
- Referee: Matthew Jones
- TV announcers (ESPN+): Wes Chandler (play-by-play), Terry Johnson (analyst) and Michelle Knezovic (sideline)

Game information

First quarter

- (9:16) EKU – Braylon Newcomb 16-yard pass from Tyler Travers (Drive: 5 plays, 80 yards, 2:31; Eastern Kentucky 6–0)

Second quarter

- (10:42) UTC – Jude Kelley 31-yard field goal (Drive: 8 plays, 25 yards, 4:03; Eastern Kentucky 6–3)
- (4:52) EKU – Brady Hensley 96-yard run, Buzz Flabiano kick (Drive: 1 play, 96 yards, 0:15; Eastern Kentucky 13–3)
- (0:29) EKU – Buzz Flabiano 33-yard field goal (Drive: 8 plays, 34 yards, 3:12; Eastern Kentucky 16–3)

Third quarter

- (9:53) UTC – Kevin Lalin 27-yard run, Jude Kelley kick (Drive: 6 plays, 50 yards, 3:11; Eastern Kentucky 16–10)
- (2:41) UTC – Battle Alberson 5-yard run, Jude Kelley kick (Drive: 3 plays, 69 yards, 1:18; Chattanooga 17–16)

Fourth quarter

- (3:48) EKU – Brayden Latham 1-yard run (Drive: 9 plays, 79 yards, 4:58; Eastern Kentucky 22–17)

Statistics	UTC	EKU
First downs	13	22
Plays–yards	58–254	66–394
Rushes–yards	31–119	43–274
Passing yards	135	120
Passing: comp–att–int	12–27–1	13–23–2
Turnovers	1	2
Time of possession	26:48	33:12

Team	Category	Player	Statistics
Chattanooga	Passing	Battle Alberson	12/27, 135 yards, INT
Chattanooga	Rushing	Kevin Lalin	17 carries, 98 yards, TD
Chattanooga	Receiving	Ashton Schumann	5 receptions, 98 yards
Eastern Kentucky	Passing	Tyler Travers	13/23, 120 yards, TD, 2 INT
Eastern Kentucky	Rushing	Brady Hensley	7 carries, 119 yards, TD
Eastern Kentucky	Receiving	Brayden Latham	2 receptions, 23 yards

=== Wofford ===
Wofford Terriers (2–1) at Chattanooga Mocs (1–2) – Game summary

Quarter	1	2	3	4	Total
Terriers	0	0	0	0	0
Mocs	0	0	0	0	0

at Finley Stadium • Chattanooga, Tennessee

- Date: September 19
- Game time: 6:00 p.m.
- TV: ESPN+

Game information

First quarter
Second quarter
Third quarter
Fourth quarter

Statistics	WOF	UTC
First downs		
Plays–yards		
Rushes–yards		
Passing yards		
Passing: comp–att–int		
Turnovers		
Time of possession		

Team	Category	Player	Statistics
Wofford	Passing		
Wofford	Rushing		
Wofford	Receiving		
Chattanooga	Passing		
Chattanooga	Rushing		
Chattanooga	Receiving		

=== at The Citadel ===
Chattanooga Mocs (2–2) at The Citadel Bulldogs (1–2) – Game summary

Quarter	1	2	3	4	Total
Mocs	0	0	0	0	0
Bulldogs	0	0	0	0	0

at Johnson Hagood Stadium • Charleston, South Carolina

- Date: September 26
- Game time: 2:00 p.m.
- TV: ESPN+

Game information

First quarter
Second quarter
Third quarter
Fourth quarter

Statistics	UTC	CIT
First downs		
Plays–yards		
Rushes–yards		
Passing yards		
Passing: comp–att–int		
Turnovers		
Time of possession		

Team	Category	Player	Statistics
Chattanooga	Passing		
Chattanooga	Rushing		
Chattanooga	Receiving		
The Citadel	Passing		
The Citadel	Rushing		
The Citadel	Receiving		

=== at East Tennessee State ===
Chattanooga Mocs (3–2) at East Tennessee State Buccaneers (3–2) – Game summary

Quarter	1	2	3	4	Total
Mocs	3	0	0	0	3
Buccaneers	7	0	0	7	14

at William B. Greene Jr. Stadium • Johnson City, Tennessee

- Date: October 3
- Game time: 3:30 p.m.
- Game weather: Cloudy • Temperature: 73 °F (23 °C) • Wind: S at 3 miles per hour (4.8 km/h)
- Game attendance: 7,103
- Referee: Jake Grombach
- TV announcers (ESPN+): Keith Brake (play-by-play), Mark Hutsell (analyst) and Kennedy Story (sideline)

Game information

First quarter

- (9:16) UTC – Jude Kelley 47-yard field goal (Drive: 10 plays, 41 yards, 4:35; Mocs 3–0)
- (5:54) ETSU – Jason Albritton 1-yard run, Ewan Johnson kick (Drive: 10 plays, 75 yards, 3:22; Buccaneers 7–3)

Second quarter

- No scoring plays

Third quarter

- No scoring plays

Fourth quarter

- (13:12) ETSU – TJ Peyton 20-yard pass from Mason Mims, Ewan Johnson kick (Drive: 12 plays, 90 yards, 5:29; Buccaneers 14–3)

Statistics	UTC	ETSU
First downs	10	20
Plays–yards	52–183	72–345
Rushes–yards	31–108	47–159
Passing yards	75	186
Passing: comp–att–int	9–21–0	15–25–1
Turnovers	1	1
Time of possession	27:50	32:10

Team	Category	Player	Statistics
Chattanooga	Passing	Battle Alberson	9/21, 75 yards
Chattanooga	Rushing	Kevin Lalin	16 carries, 55 yards
Chattanooga	Receiving	Ashton Schumann	5 receptions, 54 yards
East Tennessee State	Passing	Mason Mims	15/25, 186 yards, TD, INT
East Tennessee State	Rushing	Jason Albritton	21 carries, 95 yards, TD
East Tennessee State	Receiving	Brandon Winton	3 receptions, 57 yards

=== Samford ===
Samford Bulldogs (1–4) at Chattanooga Mocs (3–3) – Game summary

Quarter	1	2	3	4	Total
Bulldogs	0	0	0	0	0
Mocs	0	0	0	0	0

at Finley Stadium • Chattanooga, Tennessee

- Date: October 10
- Game time: 1:00 p.m.

Game information

First quarter
Second quarter
Third quarter
Fourth quarter

Statistics	SAM	UTC
First downs		
Plays–yards		
Rushes–yards		
Passing yards		
Passing: comp–att–int		
Turnovers		
Time of possession		

Team	Category	Player	Statistics
Samford	Passing		
Samford	Rushing		
Samford	Receiving		
Chattanooga	Passing		
Chattanooga	Rushing		
Chattanooga	Receiving		

=== at Western Carolina ===
Chattanooga Mocs (4–3) at Western Carolina Catamounts (3–4) – Game summary

Quarter	1	2	3	4	Total
Mocs	0	0	0	0	0
Catamounts	0	0	0	0	0

at E. J. Whitmire Stadium • Cullowhee, North Carolina

- Date: October 24
- Game time: 2:30 p.m.

Game information

First quarter
Second quarter
Third quarter
Fourth quarter

Statistics	UTC	WCU
First downs		
Plays–yards		
Rushes–yards		
Passing yards		
Passing: comp–att–int		
Turnovers		
Time of possession		

Team	Category	Player	Statistics
Chattanooga	Passing		
Chattanooga	Rushing		
Chattanooga	Receiving		
Western Carolina	Passing		
Western Carolina	Rushing		
Western Carolina	Receiving		

=== VMI ===
VMI Keydets (0–8) at Chattanooga Mocs (5–3) – Game summary

Quarter	1	2	3	4	Total
Keydets	0	0	0	0	0
Mocs	0	0	0	0	0

at Finley Stadium • Chattanooga, Tennessee

- Date: October 31
- Game time: 1:00 p.m.

Game information

First quarter
Second quarter
Third quarter
Fourth quarter

Statistics	VMI	UTC
First downs		
Plays–yards		
Rushes–yards		
Passing yards		
Passing: comp–att–int		
Turnovers		
Time of possession		

Team	Category	Player	Statistics
VMI	Passing		
VMI	Rushing		
VMI	Receiving		
Chattanooga	Passing		
Chattanooga	Rushing		
Chattanooga	Receiving		

=== No. 14 Mercer ===
No. 14 Mercer Bears (7–2) at No. 25 Chattanooga Mocs (6–3) – Game summary

Quarter	1	2	3	4	Total
No. 14 Bears	0	0	0	0	0
No. 25 Mocs	0	0	0	0	0

at Finley Stadium • Chattanooga, Tennessee

- Date: November 7
- Game time: 1:00 p.m.

Game information

First quarter
Second quarter
Third quarter
Fourth quarter

Statistics	MER	UTC
First downs		
Plays–yards		
Rushes–yards		
Passing yards		
Passing: comp–att–int		
Turnovers		
Time of possession		

Team	Category	Player	Statistics
Mercer	Passing		
Mercer	Rushing		
Mercer	Receiving		
Chattanooga	Passing		
Chattanooga	Rushing		
Chattanooga	Receiving		

=== at Furman ===
Chattanooga Mocs (6–4) at Furman Paladins (3–7) – Game summary

Quarter	1	2	3	4	Total
Mocs	0	0	0	0	0
Paladins	0	0	0	0	0

at Paladin Stadium • Greenville, South Carolina

- Date: November 14
- Game time: 1:00 p.m.

Game information

First quarter
Second quarter
Third quarter
Fourth quarter

Statistics	UTC	FUR
First downs		
Plays–yards		
Rushes–yards		
Passing yards		
Passing: comp–att–int		
Turnovers		
Time of possession		

Team	Category	Player	Statistics
Chattanooga	Passing		
Chattanooga	Rushing		
Chattanooga	Receiving		
Furman	Passing		
Furman	Rushing		
Furman	Receiving		

=== at No. 3 (FBS) Alabama ===
Chattanooga Mocs (7–4) at No. 3 (FBS) Alabama Crimson Tide (8–2) – Game summary

Quarter	1	2	3	4	Total
Mocs	0	0	0	0	0
No. 3 (FBS) Crimson Tide	0	0	0	0	0

at Bryant-Denny Stadium • Tuscaloosa, Alabama

- Date: November 21
- Game time: 2:00 p.m.

Game information

First quarter
Second quarter
Third quarter
Fourth quarter

Statistics	UTC	ALA
First downs		
Plays–yards		
Rushes–yards		
Passing yards		
Passing: comp–att–int		
Turnovers		
Time of possession		

Team	Category	Player	Statistics
Chattanooga	Passing		
Chattanooga	Rushing		
Chattanooga	Receiving		
Alabama	Passing		
Alabama	Rushing		
Alabama	Receiving		

== Rankings ==
Ranking movements Legend: ██ Increase in ranking ██ Decrease in ranking — = Not ranked RV = Received votes
	Week														
Poll	Pre	1	2	3	4	5	6	7	8	9	10	11	12	13	Final
STATS	—	RV	—	—	—	—	—	—	—	—	25	RV			
Coaches	RV	RV	—	—	RV	RV	—	—	—	RV	RV	RV			
