= 2026 NCAA Division I FCS football rankings =

Rankings for the 2026 NCAA Division I FCS football season

- Season: 2026
- Postseason: Single-elimination
- Preseason No. 1: Montana State

The 2026 National Collegiate Athletic Association (NCAA) Division I Football Championship Subdivision (FCS) football rankings consists of two human polls, in addition to various publications' preseason polls. Unlike the Football Bowl Subdivision (FBS), college football's governing body, the NCAA, bestows the national championship title through a 24-team tournament. The following weekly polls determine the top teams at the NCAA Division I Football Championship Subdivision level of college football for the 2026 season. The STATS Poll is voted on by media members while the Coaches Poll is determined by coaches at the FCS level.

Starting with the 2026 season, the Black College Football Poll was created to rank the top FCS programs from historically black colleges and universities (HBCUs) on a weekly basis. The poll is officially sanctioned by the Mid-Eastern Athletic Conference (MEAC) and Southwestern Athletic Conference (SWAC).

== Legend ==
Legend
	Increase in ranking
	Decrease in ranking
	Not ranked previous week
	Selected for NCAA FCS Playoffs
(Italics)	Number of first place votes
(#–#)	Win–loss record
т	Tied with team above or below also with this symbol

== STATS Poll ==
	Preseason August 3	Week 1 August 31	Week 2 September 7	Week 3 September 14	Week 4 September 21	Week 5 September 28	Week 6 October 5	Week 7 October 12	Week 8 October 19	Week 9 October 26	Week 10 November 2	Week 11 November 9	Week 12 November 16	Week 13	Final	
1.	Montana State (57)	Montana State (1–0) (57)	Montana State (2–0) (57)	Montana State (3–0) (57)	Montana State (4–0) (46)	Montana State (5–0) (49)	South Dakota State (5–1) (52)	South Dakota State (5–1) (52)	Tarleton State (7–0) (49)	Tarleton State (8–0) (47)	Tarleton State (9–0) (39)	Tarleton State (10–0) (48)	Tarleton State (11–0) (46)			1.
2.	Montana	South Dakota State (1–0)	South Dakota State (1–1)	South Dakota State (2–1)	South Dakota State (3–1) (10)	South Dakota State (4–1) (8)	Montana (5–1) (3)	Tarleton State (6–0) (5)	Stephen F. Austin (7–0) (4)	Stephen F. Austin (8–0) (5)	Stephen F. Austin (9–0) (7)	Montana State (9–1) (6)	Montana State (10–1) (5)			2.
3.	South Dakota State	Montana (1–0)	Montana (2–0)	Montana (3–0)	Illinois State (4–0) (1)	Montana (4–1)	Tarleton State (5–0) (2)	Stephen F. Austin (6–0)	Montana State (6–1) (3)	Montana State (7–1) (3)	Montana State (8–1) (7)	Youngstown State (8–2) (2)	South Dakota State (9–2) (6)			3.
4.	Illinois State	Illinois State (1–0)	Tarleton State (2–0)	Tarleton State (3–0)	Tarleton State (4–0)	Tarleton State (4–0)	North Dakota (5–1)	Lehigh (6–0)	Youngstown State (6–2) (1)	Youngstown State (6–2) (2)	Youngstown State (7–2) (3)	South Dakota State (8–2) (1)	Lamar (9–2)			4.
5.	Tarleton State	Tarleton State (1–0)	Illinois State (2–0)	Illinois State (3–0)	Montana (3–1)	North Dakota (4–1)	Lehigh (6–0)	Montana State (5–1)	South Dakota State (5–2)	South Dakota State (6–2)	South Dakota State (7–2) (1)	Northern Arizona (8–2)	Stephen F. Austin (10–1)			5.
6.	UC Davis	Rhode Island (1–0)	North Dakota (2–0)	North Dakota (3–0)	Lehigh (4–0)	Lehigh (5–0)	Montana State (5–1)	Youngstown State (5–2)	North Dakota (6–2)	South Dakota (7–2)	Northern Arizona (7–2)	Austin Peay (8–2)	Youngstown State (8–3)			6.
7.	Rhode Island	UC Davis (1–0)	UC Davis (2–0)	Lehigh (3–0)	North Dakota (3–1)	Stephen F. Austin (5–0)	Stephen F. Austin (6–0)	Montana (5–2)	Northern Arizona (6–2)	Northern Arizona (7–2)	Austin Peay (7–2)	Lamar (8–2) т	South Dakota (8–3)			7.
8.	Villanova	North Dakota (1–0)	Rhode Island (1–1)	Rhode Island (2–1)	South Dakota (3–1)	Youngstown State (3–2)	Youngstown State (4–2)	Northern Arizona (5–2)	South Dakota (6–2)	Austin Peay (7–2)	South Dakota (7–3)	Stephen F. Austin (9–1) т	Montana (8–3)			8.
9.	Youngstown State	Youngstown State (1–0)	Lehigh (2–0)	Youngstown State (2–1)	Stephen F. Austin (4–0)	Tennessee Tech (4–0)	Austin Peay (5–1)	South Dakota (5–2)	Austin Peay (6–2)	North Dakota (6–3)	Tennessee Tech (8–1)	Tennessee Tech (9–1)	Mercer (9–2)			9.
10.	North Dakota	Lehigh (1–0)	Youngstown State (1–1)	South Dakota (3–0)	UC Davis (3–1)	Illinois State (4–1)	South Dakota (4–2)	Lamar (5–1)	Illinois State (5–2)	Illinois State (6–2)	Illinois State (7–2)	South Dakota (7–3)	North Dakota (7–4)			10.
11.	Lehigh	South Dakota (1–0)	South Dakota (2–0)	UC Davis (2–1)	Youngstown State (3–1)	Austin Peay (4–1)	Lamar (4–1)	North Dakota (5–2)	Lehigh (6–1)	Tennessee Tech (7–1)	North Dakota (6–4)	North Dakota (7–4)	Illinois State (8–3)			11.
12.	South Dakota	Tennessee Tech (1–0)	Tennessee Tech (2–0)	Stephen F. Austin (3–0)	Tennessee Tech (3–0)	Idaho State (4–0)	Illinois State (4–2)	Austin Peay (5–2)	Tennessee Tech (6–1)	Campbell (7–1)	Montana (6–3)	Montana (7–3)	Northern Arizona (8–3)			12.
13.	Stephen F. Austin	Stephen F. Austin (1–0)	Stephen F. Austin (2–0)	Tennessee Tech (3–0)	Austin Peay (3–1)	South Dakota (3–2)	Northern Arizona (4–2)	Illinois State (4–2)	Campbell (6–1)	Harvard (6–0)	Lamar (7–2)	Mercer (8–2)	Tennessee Tech (9–2)			13.
14.	Tennessee Tech	Lamar (1–0)	Lamar (1–1)	Austin Peay (2–1) т	Idaho State (3–0)	Lamar (3–1)	UC Davis (4–2)	UC Davis (4–2)	Montana (5–3)	Montana (5–3)	Mercer (7–2)	Monmouth (8–2)	Austin Peay (8–3)			14.
15.	Abilene Christian	Austin Peay (1–0)	Austin Peay (1–1)	Lamar (2–1) т	Lamar (2–1)	South Carolina State (5–0)	Tennessee Tech (4–1)	Tennessee Tech (5–1)	Harvard (5–0)	Lamar (6–2)	Monmouth (7–2)	Illinois State (7–3)	Weber State (7–4)			15.
16.	Southern Illinois	Yale (0–0)	William & Mary (2–0)	Idaho State (3–0)	South Carolina State (4–0)	UC Davis (3–2)	Idaho State (4–1)	Campbell (5–1)	Lamar (5–2)	Mercer (6–2)	Campbell (7–2)	Campbell (8–2)	Lehigh (9–2)			16.
17.	Austin Peay	William & Mary (1–0)	Idaho State (2–0)	West Florida (2–0)	Yale (1–0)	West Florida (3–1)	Campbell (5–1)	Harvard (4–0)	Mercer (6–2)	East Tennessee State (6–2)	Lehigh (7–2)	Lehigh (8–2)	Harvard (8–1)			17.
18.	Yale	Villanova (0–1)	Mercer (2–0)	South Carolina State (3–0)	Northern Arizona (3–1)	Campbell (4–1)	Harvard (3–0)	Mercer (5–2)	East Tennessee State (5–2)	Monmouth (6–2)	Weber State (6–4)	Weber State (6–4)	Monmouth (8–3)			18.
19.	Southeastern Louisiana	Mercer (1–0)	Yale (0–0)	Yale (0–0)	Rhode Island (2–2)	Northern Arizona (3–2)	Richmond (5–1)	Northern Iowa (3–2)	Monmouth (5–2)	Lehigh (6–2)	East Tennessee State (6–3) т	Harvard (7–1)	Abilene Christian (6–5)			19.
20.	Lamar	Abilene Christian (0–1)	West Florida (2–0)	Northern Arizona (2–1)	West Florida (2–1)	Harvard (2–0)	Mercer (4–2)	East Tennessee State (5–2)	UC Davis (4–3)	UC Davis (5–3)	Harvard (6–1) т	South Carolina State (8–2)	South Carolina State (9–2)			20.
21.	Mercer	South Carolina State (1–0)	Villanova (1–1)	William & Mary (2–1)	Harvard (1–0)	Southern Illinois (3–2)	South Carolina State (5–1)	Idaho State (4–2)	Northern Iowa (3–3)	Richmond (6–2)	Albany (6–3)	Idaho State (6–4)	Incarnate Word (7–4)			21.
22.	Monmouth	Northern Arizona (1–0)	South Carolina State (2–0)	Villanova (1–2)	Campbell (3–1)	Colgate (4–1)	Jackson State (5–0)	Colgate (4–2)	Weber State (5–3)	Weber State (5–4)	Idaho State (6–3)	Incarnate Word (6–4)	Campbell (8–3)			22.
23.	UT Martin	Idaho State (1–0)	Abilene Christian (0–2)	Mercer (2–1)	Villanova (2–2)	Mercer (3–2)	Colgate (4–2)	Monmouth (4–2)	Southeastern Louisiana (4–3)	Idaho State (5–3)	Abilene Christian (5–4)	UC Davis (6–4)	UC Davis (7–4)			23.
24.	South Carolina State	Western Carolina (1–0)	Northern Arizona (1–1)	Southern Illinois (2–1)	Southern Illinois (2–2)	Richmond (4–1)	East Tennessee State (4–2)	Morgan State (5–1)	Jackson State (6–1)	Abilene Christian (4–4)	South Carolina State (7–2)	Abilene Christian (5–5)	Dayton (9–1)			24.
25.	Northern Arizona	West Florida (1–0)	Harvard (0–0)	Harvard (0–0)	Mercer (2–2)	Jackson State (4–0)	Southern Illinois (3–3)	Yale (3–1)	Richmond (5–2)	South Carolina State (6–2)	Chattanooga (6–3)	Princeton (6–2)	Idaho State (6–5)			25.
	Preseason August 3	Week 1 August 31	Week 2 September 7	Week 3 September 14	Week 4 September 21	Week 5 September 28	Week 6 October 5	Week 7 October 12	Week 8 October 19	Week 9 October 26	Week 10 November 2	Week 11 November 9	Week 12 November 16	Week 13	Final	
		Dropped: No. 16 Southern Illinois; No. 19 Southeastern Louisiana; No. 22 Monmouth; No. 23 UT Martin	Dropped: No. 24 Western Carolina	Dropped: No. 23 Abilene Christian	Dropped: No. 21 William & Mary	Dropped: No. 17 Yale; No. 19 Rhode Island; No. 23 Villanova	Dropped: No. 17 West Florida	Dropped: No. 19 Richmond; No. 21 South Carolina State; No. 22 Jackson State; No. 25 Southern Illinois	Dropped: No. 21 Idaho State; No. 22 Colgate; No. 24 Morgan State; No. 25 Yale	Dropped: No. 21 Northern Iowa; No. 23 Southeastern Louisiana; No. 24 Jackson State	Dropped: No. 20 UC Davis; No. 21 Richmond	Dropped: No. 19т East Tennessee State; No. 21 Albany; No. 25 Chattanooga	Dropped: No. 25 Princeton	None	None	

== Coaches Poll ==
	Preseason August 17	Week 1 August 31	Week 2 September 8	Week 3 September 14	Week 4 September 21	Week 5 September 28	Week 6 October 5	Week 7 October 12	Week 8 October 19	Week 9 October 26	Week 10 November 2	Week 11 November 9	Week 12 November 16	Week 13	Final	
1.	Montana State (25)	Montana State (1–0) (26)	Montana State (2–0) (25)	Montana State (3–0) (26)	Montana State (4–0) (25)	Montana State (5–0) (25)	South Dakota State (5–1) (24)	South Dakota State (5–1) (23)	Tarleton State (7–0) (24)	Tarleton State (8–0) (25)	Tarleton State (9–0) (23)	Tarleton State (10–0) (26)	Tarleton State (11–0) (26)			1.
2.	Montana	South Dakota State (1–0)	Montana (2–0)	Montana (3–0)	South Dakota State (3–1)	South Dakota State (4–1)	Tarleton State (5–0) (1)	Tarleton State (6–0) (3)	Stephen F. Austin (7–0) (2)	Stephen F. Austin (8–0) (1)	Stephen F. Austin (9–0) (3)	Montana State (9–1)	Montana State (10–1)			2.
3.	South Dakota State (1)	Montana (1–0)	South Dakota State (1–1) (1)	South Dakota State (2–1)	Tarleton State (4–0)	Tarleton State (4–0)	Montana (5–1) (1)	Stephen F. Austin (6–0)	Montana State (6–1)	Montana State (7–1)	Montana State (8–1)	Youngstown State (8–2)	South Dakota State (9–2)			3.
4.	Illinois State	Illinois State (1–0)	Illinois State (2–0)	Illinois State (3–0)	Illinois State (4–0) (1) т	Montana (4–1)	Stephen F. Austin (6–0)	Lehigh (6–0)	Youngstown State (6–2)	Youngstown State (6–2)	Youngstown State (7–2)	South Dakota State (8–2)	Stephen F. Austin (10–1)			4.
5.	Tarleton State	Tarleton State (1–0)	Tarleton State (2–0)	Tarleton State (3–0)	Montana (3–1) т	Stephen F. Austin (5–0)	Lehigh (6–0)	Montana State (5–1)	South Dakota State (5–2)	South Dakota State (6–2)	South Dakota State (7–2)	Northern Arizona (8–2)	Lamar (9–2)			5.
6.	UC Davis	UC Davis (1–0)	UC Davis (2–0)	North Dakota (3–0)	Stephen F. Austin (4–0)	Lehigh (5–0)	Montana State (5–1)	Youngstown State (5–2)	South Dakota (6–2)	South Dakota (7–2)	Northern Arizona (7–2)	Austin Peay (8–2)	South Dakota (8–3)			6.
7.	Villanova	Youngstown State (1–0)	North Dakota (2–0)	Lehigh (3–0)	Lehigh (4–0)	North Dakota (4–1)	North Dakota (5–1)	Montana (5–2)	Northern Arizona (6–2)	Northern Arizona (6–2)	Austin Peay (7–2)	Stephen F. Austin (9–1)	Mercer (9–2)			7.
8.	Rhode Island	Rhode Island (1–0)	Lehigh (2–0)	Stephen F. Austin (3–0)	North Dakota (3–1)	Tennessee Tech (4–0)	Austin Peay (5–1)	Lamar (5–1)	North Dakota (6–2)	Austin Peay (7–2)	Illinois State (7–2)	Lamar (8–2)	Youngstown State (8–3)			8.
9.	Youngstown State	North Dakota (1–0)	Stephen F. Austin (2–0)	Youngstown State (2–1)	UC Davis (3–1)	Austin Peay (4–1)	Youngstown State (4–2)	South Dakota (5–2)	Austin Peay (6–2)	Illinois State (6–2)	Tennessee Tech (8–1)	Tennessee Tech (9–1)	Montana (8–3)			9.
10.	North Dakota	Lehigh (1–0)	Youngstown State (1–1)	Tennessee Tech (3–0)	Tennessee Tech (3–0)	Youngstown State (3–2)	Lamar (4–1)	Northern Arizona (5–2)	Illinois State (5–2)	Tennessee Tech (7–1)	South Dakota (7–3)	South Dakota (7–3)	Northern Arizona (8–3)			10.
11.	Lehigh	Stephen F. Austin (1–0)	Tennessee Tech (2–0)	UC Davis (2–1)	Austin Peay (3–1)	Illinois State (4–1)	UC Davis (4–2)	Austin Peay (5–2)	Tennessee Tech (6–1)	North Dakota (6–3)	Mercer (7–2)	Mercer (8–2)	North Dakota (7–4)			11.
12.	South Dakota	South Dakota (1–0)	South Dakota (2–0)	South Dakota (3–0)	South Dakota (3–1)	South Carolina State (5–0)	South Dakota (4–2)	UC Davis (4–2)	Lehigh (6–1)	Mercer (6–2)	Lamar (7–2)	Montana (7–3) т	Tennessee Tech (9–2)			12.
13.	Stephen F. Austin	Tennessee Tech (1–0)	Rhode Island (1–1)	Rhode Island (2–1)	Youngstown State (2–2)	Lamar (3–1)	Illinois State (4–2)	Illinois State (4–2)	Mercer (6–2)	Lamar (6–2)	Montana (6–3)	North Dakota (7–4) т	Illinois State (8–3)			13.
14.	Abilene Christian	Austin Peay (1–0)	Mercer (2–0)	Austin Peay (2–1)	South Carolina State (4–0)	Idaho State (4–0)	Northern Arizona (4–2)	Tennessee Tech (5–1)	Montana (5–3)	Montana (5–3)	Monmouth (7–2)	Monmouth (8–2)	Austin Peay (8–3)			14.
15.	Tennessee Tech	Mercer (1–0)	Austin Peay (1–1)	Lamar (2–1)	Lamar (2–1)	UC Davis (3–2)	Richmond (5–1)	North Dakota (5–2)	Lamar (5–2)	Campbell (7–1)	North Dakota (6–4)	Lehigh (8–2)	Lehigh (9–2)			15.
16.	Southern Illinois	Lamar (1–0)	William & Mary (2–0)	South Carolina State (3–0)	Idaho State (3–0)	South Dakota (3–2)	Tennessee Tech (4–1)	Mercer (5–2)	Campbell (6–1)	Harvard (6–0)	Lehigh (7–2)	Campbell (8–2)	Weber State (7–4)			16.
17.	Mercer	Villanova (0–1)	Lamar (1–1)	West Florida (2–0)	Northern Arizona (3–1)	Richmond (4–1)	Idaho State (4–1)	Harvard (4–0)	Harvard (5–0)	Monmouth (6–2)	South Carolina State (7–2)	Illinois State (7–3)	Harvard (8–1)			17.
18.	Austin Peay	Yale (0–0)	Villanova (1–1)	Idaho State (3–0)	Yale (1–0)	West Florida (3–1)	Mercer (4–2)	Campbell (5–1)	Monmouth (5–2)	East Tennessee State (6–2)	Idaho State (6–3)	South Carolina State (8–2)	South Carolina State (9–2)			18.
19.	Yale	William & Mary (1–0)	Yale (0–0)	Northern Arizona (2–1)	Richmond (3–1)	Northern Arizona (3–2)	Harvard (3–0)	Colgate (4–2)	Richmond (5–2)	Richmond (6–2)	Campbell (7–2)	Harvard (7–1)	Abilene Christian (6–5)			19.
20.	Southeastern Louisiana	Northern Arizona (1–0)	South Carolina State (2–0)	Yale (0–0)	West Florida (2–1)	Colgate (4–1)	Campbell (5–1)	Monmouth (4–2)	East Tennessee State (5–2)	Lehigh (6–2)	Albany (6–3)	Weber State (6–4)	Monmouth (8–3)			20.
21.	Lamar	Abilene Christian (0–1)	Richmond (2–0)	William & Mary (2–1)	Rhode Island (2–2)	Mercer (3–2)	South Carolina State (5–1)	Idaho State (4–2)	UC Davis (4–3)	UC Davis (5–3)	East Tennessee State (6–3)	Idaho State (6–4)	Campbell (8–3)			21.
22.	UT Martin	South Carolina State (1–0)	West Florida (2–0)	Mercer (2–1)	Villanova (2–2)	Harvard (2–0)	Jackson State (5–0)	Richmond (5–2)	Jackson State (6–1)	South Carolina State (6–2)	Abilene Christian (5–4) т	Jackson State (7–2)	Albany (7–4)			22.
23.	Monmouth	Richmond (1–0)	Northern Arizona (1–1)	Villanova (1–2)	Colgate (3–1) т	Jackson State (4–0)	Colgate (4–2)	Yale (3–1)	West Florida (4–2)	Idaho State (5–3)	Harvard (6–1) т	Princeton (6–2)	UC Davis (7–4)			23.
24.	Northern Arizona	Central Arkansas (1–0)	Idaho State (2–0)	Furman (2–1)	Mercer (2–2) т	Campbell (4–1)	Monmouth (4–2)	East Tennessee State (5–2)	Southeastern Louisiana (4–3)	Abilene Christian (4–4)	Alabama A&M (7–2)	Abilene Christian (5–5)	Incarnate Word (7–4)			24.
25.	South Carolina State	Southern Illinois (0–1)	Abilene Christian (0–2)	Southern Illinois (2–1)	Harvard (1–0)	Southern Illinois (3–2)	Southeastern Louisiana (3–2)	Northern Iowa (3–2)	South Carolina State (5–2)	Albany (5–3)	Weber State (6–4)	Albany (6–4)	Idaho State (6–5)			25.
	Preseason August 17	Week 1 August 31	Week 2 September 8	Week 3 September 14	Week 4 September 21	Week 5 September 28	Week 6 October 5	Week 7 October 12	Week 8 October 19	Week 9 October 26	Week 10 November 2	Week 11 November 9	Week 12 November 16	Week 13	Final	
		Dropped: No. 20 Southeastern Louisiana; No. 22 UT Martin; No. 23 Monmouth	Dropped: No. 24 Central Arkansas; No. 25 Southern Illinois	Dropped: No. 21 Richmond; No. 25 Abilene Christian	Dropped: No. 21 William & Mary; No. 24 Furman; No. 25 Southern Illinois	Dropped: No. 18 Yale; No. 21 Rhode Island; No. 22 Villanova	Dropped: No. 18 West Florida; No. 25 Southern Illinois	Dropped: No. 21 South Carolina State; No. 22 Jackson State; No. 25 Southeastern Louisiana	Dropped: No. 19 Colgate; No. 21 Idaho State; No. 23 Yale; No. 25 Northern Iowa	Dropped: No. 22 Jackson State; No. 23 West Florida; No. 24 Southeastern Louisiana	Dropped: No. 19 Richmond; No. 21 UC Davis	Dropped: No. 21 East Tennessee State; No. 24 Alabama A&M	Dropped: No. 22 Jackson State; No. 23 Princeton	None	None	

== Black College Football Poll ==
	Preseason July 9	Week 1 September 1	Week 2 September 8	Week 3 September 14	Week 4 September 21	Week 5 September 28	Week 6 October 5	Week 7 October 12	Week 8 October 19	Week 9 October 26	Week 10 November 2	Week 11 November 9	Week 12 November 16	Week 13	Final	
1.	South Carolina State (36)	South Carolina State (1–0) (20)	South Carolina State (2–0) (23)	South Carolina State (3–0) (26)	South Carolina State (4–0) (20)	South Carolina State (5–0) (27)	Jackson State (5–0) (13)	Morgan State (5–1) (20)	Jackson State (6–1) (13)	Alabama A&M (6–2)	Alabama A&M (7–2) (13)	South Carolina State (8–2) (21)	South Carolina State (9–2) (22)			1.
2.	Prairie View A&M (2)	Alabama State (1–0) (8)	Prairie View A&M (1–1) (1)	Jackson State (2–0)	Jackson State (3–0)	Jackson State (4–0)	South Carolina State (5–1) (11)	Jackson State (5–1)	Alabama A&M (6–2) (6)	South Carolina State (6–2)	South Carolina State (7–2) (10)	Jackson State (7–2) (1)	Alabama A&M (8–3)			2.
3.	Jackson State (4)	Jackson State (1–0)	Alabama State (2–0) т	Alabama State (2–1)	Alabama State (2–1)	Alabama State (3–1)	Morgan State (4–1) (2)	Alabama A&M (5–2)	South Carolina State (5–2) (2)	Bethune–Cookman (5–3)	Jackson State (6–2)	Prairie View A&M (5–5)	Prairie View A&M (6–5)			3.
4.	Alabama State (6)	Delaware State (1–0)	Jackson State (2–0) т	Prairie View A&M (1–2)	Delaware State (2–2)	Delaware State (3–2)	Alabama A&M (4–2)	Grambling State (4–2)	Morgan State (5–2)	Jackson State (6–2)	Alcorn State (5–4)	Alabama A&M (7–3)	Jackson State (7–3)			4.
5.	North Carolina Central	Prairie View A&M (0–1)	Delaware State (1–1)	Delaware State (2–1)	Morgan State (3–1)	Alabama A&M (4–1)	Alabama State (3–2)	South Carolina State (5–2)	Delaware State (4–3)	Morgan State (5–3)	Arkansas–Pine Bluff (5–3)	Alcorn State (6–4)	Alabama State (6–4)			5.
6.	Delaware State	Texas Southern (1–0) (1)	Grambling State (2–0) (1)	Grambling State (2–1)	Prairie View A&M (1–3)	Prairie View A&M (2–3)	Bethune–Cookman (3–2)	Delaware State (4–3)	Alabama State (4–3) т	Grambling State (4–3)	Prairie View A&M (4–5)	Arkansas–Pine Bluff (6–3)	Arkansas–Pine Bluff (6–4)			6.
7.	Grambling State	Howard (1–0)	Howard (1–1)	North Carolina Central (2–1)	Alabama A&M (3–1)	Morgan State (3–1)	Grambling State (3–2)	Alcorn State (4–3)	Grambling State (4–3) т	Alabama State (4–3)	Delaware State (5–4)	North Carolina Central (5–5)	Southern (6–5)			7.
8.	Bethune–Cookman	Grambling State (1–0)	North Carolina Central (1–1)	Alabama A&M (2–1)	Grambling State (2–1)	Alcorn State (3–2)	Delaware State (3–3)	Norfolk State (4–3)	Bethune–Cookman (4–3)	Prairie View A&M (4–5)	North Carolina Central (4–5)	Delaware State (6–4)	Alcorn State (6–5)			8.
9.	Texas Southern	Florida A&M (1–0)	Texas Southern (1–1)	Alcorn State (2–1)	Alcorn State (2–2)	Grambling State (2–2)	Prairie View A&M (2–4)	Alabama State (3–3)	Norfolk State (4–3)	Howard (4–4)	Bethune–Cookman (5–4)	Alabama State (5–4)	North Carolina Central (5–6)			9.
10.	Florida A&M	Morgan State (1–0)	Alabama A&M (1–1)	Morgan State (2–1)	North Carolina Central (2–2)	Norfolk State (3–2)	Alcorn State (3–3)	Arkansas–Pine Bluff (3–2)	Prairie View A&M (3–5)	Alcorn State (4–4)	Alabama State (4–4)	Southern (5–5)	Delaware State (6–5)			10.
	Preseason July 9	Week 1 September 1	Week 2 September 8	Week 3 September 14	Week 4 September 21	Week 5 September 28	Week 6 October 5	Week 7 October 12	Week 8 October 19	Week 9 October 26	Week 10 November 2	Week 11 November 9	Week 12 November 16	Week 13	Final	
		Dropped: No. 5 North Carolina Central; No. 8 Bethune–Cookman	Dropped: No. 9 Florida A&M; No. 10 Morgan State	Dropped: No. 7 Howard; No. 9 Texas Southern	None	Dropped: No. 10 North Carolina Central	Dropped: No. 10 Norfolk State	Dropped: No. 6 Bethune–Cookman; No. 9 Prairie View A&M	Dropped: No. 7 Alcorn State; No. 10 Arkansas–Pine Bluff	Dropped: No. 5 Delaware State; No. 9 Norfolk State	Dropped: No. 5 Morgan State; No. 6 Grambling State; No. 9 Howard	Dropped: No. 9 Bethune–Cookman	None	None	None	
