= 2026 Tennessee Tech Golden Eagles football team =

American college football season

2026 Tennessee Tech Golden Eagles football
- Conference: Southern Conference

Ranking
- STATS: No. 13
- FCS Coaches: No. 12
- Record: 9–3 (6–2 SoCon)
- Head coach: Bobby Wilder (3rd season)
- Offensive coordinator: Drew Belcher (1st season)
- Defensive coordinator: Chase Mummau (2nd season)
- Home stadium: Tucker Stadium

2026 Southern Conference football standings
	Conf.			Overall
Team	W		L	W		L
No. 9 Mercer $^	7	–	1	10	–	2
No. 13 Tennessee Tech	6	–	2	9	–	3
Chattanooga	6	–	2	7	–	5
East Tennessee State	5	–	3	7	–	5
Western Carolina	5	–	3	7	–	5
Samford	4	–	4	4	–	7
Wofford	3	–	5	5	–	7
Furman	3	–	5	4	–	8
The Citadel	1	–	7	3	–	9
VMI	0	–	8	0	–	12
$ – Conference champion; ^ – FCS playoff participant; As of November 22, 2026; Rankings from STATS Poll

The 2026 Tennessee Tech Golden Eagles football team will represent Tennessee Technological University as a member of the Southern Conference (SoCon) during the 2026 NCAA Division I FCS football season. The Golden Eagles will be led by third-year head coach Bobby Wilder and will play their home games at Tucker Stadium in Cookeville, Tennessee. The 2026 season will be the Golden Eagles first season competing in the SoCon conference.

== Schedule ==
Date	Time	Opponent	Rank	Site	TV	Result	Attendance
August 29	6:00 p.m.	No. 22 Monmouth*	No. 14	Tucker Stadium; Cookeville, TN	ESPN+	W 38–14	4,800
September 5	5:00 p.m.	at Chattanooga (Note: The game against Chattanooga, a fellow member of the Southern Conference, is a non-conference game and not count in the league standings.)*	No. 12	Finley Stadium; Chattanooga, TN	ESPN+	W 24–9	6,869
September 12	6:00 p.m.	Samford	No. 12	Tucker Stadium; Cookeville, TN	ESPN+	W 45–19	3,428
September 26	12:30 p.m.	at Wofford	No. 12	Gibbs Stadium; Spartanburg, SC	ESPN+	W 42–38	6,284
October 3	5:00 p.m.	at Western Carolina	No. 9	E. J. Whitmire Stadium; Cullowhee, NC	ESPN+	L 20–44	9,145
October 10	2:30 p.m.	Furman	No. 15	Tucker Stadium; Cookeville, TN	ESPN+	W 20–15	3,260
October 17	1:30 p.m.	Eastern Kentucky*	No. 15	Tucker Stadium; Cookeville, TN	ESPN+	W 49–20	
October 24	1:00 p.m.	at The Citadel	No. 12	Johnson Hagood Stadium; Charleston, SC	ESPN+	W 28–13	8,527
October 31	2:30 p.m.	at No. 17 East Tennessee State	No. 11	William B. Greene Jr. Stadium; Johnson City, TN	ESPN+	W 24–17	9,437
November 7	1:30 p.m.	VMI^{†}	No. 9	Tucker Stadium; Cookeville, TN	ESPN+	W 66–14	5,922
November 14	1:30 p.m.	No. 13 Mercer	No. 9	Tucker Stadium; Cookeville, TN	ESPN+	L 31–38	4,012
November 21	12:00 p.m.	at Mississippi State*	No. 13	Davis Wade Stadium; Starkville, MS	SECN+	L 16–34	41,121
*Non-conference game; ^{†}Homecoming; Rankings from STATS Poll released prior to the game; All times are in Central time

== Game summaries ==
=== No. 22 Monmouth ===
No. 22 Monmouth Hawks (0–0) at No. 14 Tennessee Tech Golden Eagles (0–0) – Game summary

Quarter	1	2	3	4	Total
No. 22 Hawks	0	7	0	7	14
No. 14 Golden Eagles	7	10	7	14	38

at Tucker Stadium • Cookeville, Tennessee

- Date: August 29
- Game time: 6:00 p.m.
- Game weather: Sunny • Temperature: 89 °F (32 °C) • Wind: SE at 2 miles per hour (3.2 km/h)
- Game attendance: 4,800
- Referee: Todd Boyd
- TV announcers (ESPN+): Dylan Vazzano and Sam Brooks

Game information

First quarter

- TNTC – Gabe Nunez 2-yard pass from Jax Leatherwood (Carter Brown kick), 9:56. Golden Eagles 7–0. Drive: 9 plays, 38 yards, 3:34.

Second quarter

- MONM – Elijah Jennings 11-yard run (Sky Sholder kick), 4:45. Tied 7–7. Drive: 6 plays, 69 yards, 1:24.
- TNTC – Qua Ashley 18-yard pass from Jax Leatherwood (Carter Brown kick), 1:00. Golden Eagles 14–7. Drive: 4 plays, 32 yards, 0:51.
- TNTC – Carter Brown 40-yard field goal, 0:00. Golden Eagles 17–7. Drive: 4 plays, 18 yards, 0:18.

Third quarter

- TNTC – M.J. Flowers 6-yard run (Carter Brown kick), 12:41. Golden Eagles 24–7. Drive: 5 plays, 75 yards, 2:19.

Fourth quarter

- TNTC – Maury Sullivan 16-yard pass from Jax Leatherwood (Carter Brown kick), 12:01. Golden Eagles 31–7. Drive: 4 plays, 41 yards, 1:55.
- TNTC – Qua Ashley 23-yard pass from Jax Leatherwood (Carter Brown kick), 4:53. Golden Eagles 38–7. Drive: 9 plays, 61 yards, 5:46.
- MONM – Kenny Smith 1-yard run (Sky Sholder kick), 1:50. Golden Eagles 38–14. Drive: 12 plays, 76 yards, 2:58.

Statistics	MONM	TNTC
First downs	21	24
Plays–yards	65–304	73–395
Rushes–yards	24–125	37–106
Passing yards	179	289
Passing: comp–att–int	20–41–1	24–36–0
Turnovers	2	1
Time of possession	22:05	37:55

Team	Category	Player	Statistics
Monmouth	Passing	Frankie Weaver	20/41, 179 yards, INT
Monmouth	Rushing	Elijah Jennings	12 carries, 78 yards, TD
Monmouth	Receiving	Greg Genross	4 receptions, 39 yards
Tennessee Tech	Passing	Jax Leatherwood	24/35, 289 yards, 4 TD
Tennessee Tech	Rushing	M.J. Flowers	15 carries, 58 yards, TD
Tennessee Tech	Receiving	Gabe Nunez	6 receptions, 118 yards, TD

=== at Chattanooga ===
No. 12 Tennessee Tech Golden Eagles (1–0) at Chattanooga Mocs (1–0) – Game summary

Quarter	1	2	3	4	Total
No. 12 Golden Eagles	0	7	10	7	24
Mocs	3	3	0	3	9

at Finley Stadium • Chattanooga, Tennessee

- Date: September 5
- Game time: 5:00 p.m.
- Game weather: Sunny • Temperature: 92 °F (33 °C) • Wind: SE at 5 miles per hour (8.0 km/h)
- Game attendance: 6,869
- Referee: Brian Hilpisch
- TV announcers (ESPN+): Pete Yanity (play-by-play), Cole Neely (analyst) and Dave Friedman (sideline)

Game information

First quarter

- UTC – Jude Kelley 22-yard field goal, 1:00. Mocs 3–0. Drive: 8 plays, 46 yards, 4:48.

Second quarter

- TNTC – Marcus Harris II 1-yard run (Carter Brown kick), 1:16. Golden Eagles 7–3. Drive: 8 plays, 45 yards, 3:21.
- UTC – Jude Kelley 33-yard field goal, 0:00. Golden Eagles 7–6. Drive: 6 plays, 59 yards, 1:11.

Third quarter

- TNTC – Carter Brown 50-yard field goal, 6:58. Golden Eagles 10–6. Drive: 13 plays, 48 yards, 5:36.
- TNTC – Maury Sullivan 16-yard pass from Jax Leatherwood (Carter Brown kick), 1:01. Golden Eagles 17–6. Drive: 3 plays, 43 yards, 1:11.

Fourth quarter

- UTC – Jude Kelley 39-yard field goal, 8:32. Golden Eagles 17–9. Drive: 8 plays, 59 yards, 4:00.
- TNTC – Gabe Nunez 11-yard pass from Jax Leatherwood (Carter Brown kick), 2:44. Golden Eagles 24–9. Drive: 10 plays, 75 yards, 5:48.

Statistics	TNTC	UTC
First downs	13	13
Plays–yards	61–237	51–227
Rushes–yards	29–76	35–190
Passing yards	161	37
Passing: comp–att–int	19–32–1	6–16–2
Turnovers	1	2
Time of possession	35:05	24:55

Team	Category	Player	Statistics
Tennessee Tech	Passing	Jax Leatherwood	19/32, 161 yards, 2 TD, INT
Tennessee Tech	Rushing	M.J. Flowers	9 carries, 50 yards
Tennessee Tech	Receiving	Maury Sullivan	5 receptions, 68 yards, TD
Chattanooga	Passing	Battle Alberson	6/16, 37 yards, 2 INT
Chattanooga	Rushing	Journey Wyche	12 carries, 113 yards
Chattanooga	Receiving	Erik Bussmann	3 receptions, 17 yards

=== Samford ===
Samford Bulldogs (0–2) at No. 12 Tennessee Tech Golden Eagles (2–0) – Game summary

Quarter	1	2	3	4	Total
Bulldogs	3	6	10	0	19
No. 12 Golden Eagles	14	17	14	0	45

at Tucker Stadium • Cookeville, Tennessee

- Date: September 12
- Game time: 6:00 p.m.
- Game weather: Sunny • Temperature: 78 °F (26 °C)
- Game attendance: 3,428
- Referee: Jake Grombach
- TV announcers (ESPN+): Jacob Vinson (play-by-play) and Sam Brooks (analyst)

Game information

First quarter

- TNTC – Tre Holloway 48-yard pass from Jax Leatherwood (Carter Brown kick), 12:18. Golden Eagles 7–0. Drive: 5 plays, 75 yards, 2:48.
- TNTC – Qua Ashley 56-yard run (Carter Brown kick), 8:20. Golden Eagles 14–0. Drive: 4 plays, 75 yards, 1:37.
- SAM – Ty Ippolito 54-yard field goal, 4:07. Golden Eagles 14–3. Drive: 11 plays, 39 yards, 4:13.

Second quarter

- TNTC – Tre Holloway 43-yard pass from Jax Leatherwood (Carter Brown kick), 12:43. Golden Eagles 21–3. Drive: 5 plays, 70 yards, 2:17.
- TNTC – Tre Holloway 4-yard run (Carter Brown kick), 8:48. Golden Eagles 28–3. Drive: 7 plays, 66 yards, 4:31.
- SAM – Ty Ippolito 22-yard field goal, 4:55. Golden Eagles 28–6. Drive: 10 plays, 71 yards, 3:53.
- TNTC – Carter Brown 49-yard field goal, 1:01. Golden Eagles 31–6. Drive: 8 plays, 34 yards, 3:54.
- SAM – Ty Ippolito 58-yard field goal, 0:02. Golden Eagles 31–9. Drive: 6 plays, 19 yards, 1:01.

Third quarter

- SAM – Ty Ippolito 28-yard field goal, 11:28. Golden Eagles 31–12. Drive: 8 plays, 64 yards, 3:32.
- TNTC – Tre Holloway 76-yard punt return (Carter Brown kick), 7:29. Golden Eagles 38–12.
- SAM – Gabarri Johnson 7-yard run (Ty Ippolito kick), 3:55. Golden Eagles 38–19. Drive: 8 plays, 68 yards, 3:34.
- TNTC – Joe Hall III 0-yard fumble return (Carter Brown kick), 0:51. Golden Eagles 45–19.

Fourth quarter

- No scoring plays.

Statistics	SAM	TNTC
First downs	32	18
Plays–yards	75–320	54–409
Rushes–yards	25–39	32–180
Passing yards	281	229
Passing: comp–att–int	24–50–0	15–22–0
Turnovers	1	0
Time of possession	30:02	29:58

Team	Category	Player	Statistics
Samford	Passing	Gabarri Johnson	23/49, 245 yards
Samford	Rushing	Ken Cherry	5 carries, 21 yards
Samford	Receiving	Cayden Aukerman	3 receptions, 73 yards
Tennessee Tech	Passing	Jax Leatherwood	15/22, 229 yards, 2 TD
Tennessee Tech	Rushing	Qua Ashley	5 carries, 81 yards, TD
Tennessee Tech	Receiving	Tre Holloway	6 receptions, 124 yards, 2 TD

=== at Wofford ===
No. 12 Tennessee Tech Golden Eagles (3–0) at Wofford Terriers (2–2) – Game summary

Quarter	1	2	3	4	Total
No. 12 Golden Eagles	7	7	7	21	42
Terriers	7	21	7	3	38

at Gibbs Stadium • Spartanburg, South Carolina

- Date: September 26
- Game time: 12:30 p.m.
- Game weather: Sunny • Temperature: 77 °F (25 °C) • Wind: W at 4 miles per hour (6.4 km/h)
- Game attendance: 6,284
- Referee: Jason Graham
- TV announcers (ESPN+): Jim Noble (play-by-play), Thom Henson (analyst) and Van Hipp (sideline)

Game information

First quarter

- WOF - Colby Alexander 40-yard pass from Ethan Drumm (Sam Spence kick), 12:35. Terriers 7–0. Drive: 5 plays, 75 yards, 2:25.
- TNTC - Qua Ashley 4-yard pass from Jax Leatherwood (Carter Brown kick), 1:51. Tied 7–7. Drive: 5 plays, 52 yards, 2:38.

Second quarter

- WOF - Isaiah Scott 10-yard pass from Ethan Drumm (Sam Spence kick), 9:29. Terriers 14–7. Drive: 6 plays, 40 yards, 2:22.
- WOF - Jack Ewell 76-yard pass from Ethan Drumm (Sam Spence kick), 5:01. Terriers 21–7. Drive: 1 play, 76 yards, 0:11.
- TNTC - Ivan Hoyt 10-yard pass from Jax Leatherwood (Carter Brown kick), 4:57. Terriers 21–14. Drive: 4 plays, 75 yards, 1:40.
- WOF - Terrence Honeywood 11-yard pass from Ethan Drumm (Sam Spence kick), 0:48. Terriers 28–14. Drive: 7 plays, 75 yards, 2:29.

Third quarter

- TNTC - Qua Ashley 100-yard kickoff return (Cater Brown kick), 14:48. Terriers 28–21. Drive: 0 plays, 100 yards, 0:12.
- WOF - Gerald Modest Jr. 14-yard run (Sam Spence kick), 10:42. Terriers 35–21. Drive: 9 plays, 65 yards, 4:06.

Fourth quarter

- TNTC - Eric Weatherly 24-yard pass from Jax Leatherwood (Carter Brown kick), 12:52. Terriers 35–28. Drive: 7 plays, 43 yards, 2:08.
- TNTC - M.J. Flowers 8-yard pass from Jax Leatherwood (Carter Brown kick), 3:23. Tied 35–35. Drive: 14 plays, 69 yards, 7:19.
- WOF - Sam Spence 53-yard field goal, 1:46. Terriers 38–35. Drive: 6 plays, 42 yards, 1:32.
- TNTC - Eric Weatherly 15-yard pass from Jax Leatherwood (Carter Brown kick), 1:06. Golden Eagles 42–38. Drive: 3 plays, 30 yards, 0:30.

Statistics	TNTC	WOF
First downs	27	20
Plays–yards	77–501	54–380
Rushes–yards	27–74	23–76
Passing yards	427	304
Passing: comp–att–int	38–48–1	19–31–0
Turnovers	1	0
Time of possession	39:22	20:38

Team	Category	Player	Statistics
Tennessee Tech	Passing	Jax Leatherwood	38/48, 427 yards, 5 TD, INT
Tennessee Tech	Rushing	M.J. Flowers	14 carries, 44 yards
Tennessee Tech	Receiving	Eric Weatherly	9 receptions, 100 yards, 2 TD
Wofford	Passing	Ethan Drumm	19/31, 304 yards, 4 TD
Wofford	Rushing	Gerald Modest Jr.	17 carries, 84 yards, TD
Wofford	Receiving	Colby Alexander	4 receptions, 100 yards, TD

=== at Western Carolina ===
No. 9 Tennessee Tech Golden Eagles (4–0) at Western Carolina Catamounts (2–3) – Game summary

Quarter	1	2	3	4	Total
No. 9 Golden Eagles	0	17	3	0	20
Catamounts	10	10	10	14	44

at E. J. Whitmire Stadium • Cullowhee, North Carolina

- Date: October 3
- Game time: 5:00 p.m.
- Game weather: Cloudy • Temperature: 75 °F (24 °C) • Wind: SW at 2 miles per hour (3.2 km/h)
- Game attendance: 9,145
- Referee: Jeff Page
- TV announcers (ESPN+): Pete Yanity (play-by-play), Cole Neely (analyst) and Dave Friedman (sideline)

Game information

First quarter

- WCU - Bryan McCollum 25-yard field goal, 6:42. Catamounts 3–0. Drive: 13 plays, 84 yards, 5:23.
- WCU - Jordan Martin-Durham 1-yard run (Bryan McCollum kick), 1:44. Catamounts 10–0. Drive: 9 plays, 63 yards, 3:33.

Second quarter

- WCU - Jai Boyd 49-yard pass from Lex Thomas (Bryan McCollum kick), 12:11. Catamounts 17–0. Drive: 8 plays, 80 yards, 1:28.
- TNTC - Gabe Nunez 18-yard pass from Jax Leatherwood (Carter Brown kick), 10:43. Catamounts 17–7. Drive: 4 plays, 65 yards, 1:28.
- WCU - Bryan McCollum 39-yard field goal, 7:26. Catamounta 20–7. Drive: 9 plays, 44 yards, 3:17.
- TNTC - Eric Weatherly 4-yard pass from Jax Leatherwood (Carter Brown kick), 4:32. Catamounts 20–14. Drive: 8 plays, 75 yards, 2:54.
- TNTC - Carter Brown 50-yard field goal, 0:03. Catamounts 20–17. Drive: 6 plays, 30 yards, 1:10.

Third quarter

- WCU - Josh Perry 35-yard run (Bryan McCollum kick), 10:40. Catamounts 27–17. Drive: 9 plays, 45 yards, 4:12.
- TNTC - Carter Brown 30-yard field goal, 3:09. Catamounts 27–20. Drive: 7 plays, 33 yards, 2:02.
- WCU - Bryan McCollum 29-yard field goal, 0:05. Catamounts 30–20. Drive: 4 plays, 7 yards, 2:02.

Fourth quarter

- WCU - Josh Perry 13-yard run (Bryan McCollum kick), 14:22. Catamounts 37–20. Drive: 1 play, -5 yards, 0:38.
- WCU - Jordan Martin-Durham 1-yard run (Bryan McCollum kick), 1:03. Catamounts 44–22. Drive 14 plays, 53 yards, 6:41.

Statistics	TNTC	WCU
First downs	21	28
Plays–yards	61–395	91–534
Rushes–yards	15–53	61–298
Passing yards	342	236
Passing: comp–att–int	24–46–1	19–30–0
Turnovers	5	1
Time of possession	20:46	39:14

Team	Category	Player	Statistics
Tennessee Tech	Passing	Jax Leatherwood	26/46, 342 yards, 2 TD, INT
Tennessee Tech	Rushing	M.J. Flowers	5 carries, 29 yards
Tennessee Tech	Receiving	Greg Nunez	13 receptions, 225 yards, TD
Western Carolina	Passing	Lex Thomas	19/30, 236 yards, TD
Western Carolina	Rushing	Josh Perry	25 carries, 157 yards, 2 TD
Western Carolina	Receiving	AJ Colombo	6 receptions, 60 yards

=== Furman ===
Furman Paladins (2–4) at No. 15 Tennessee Tech Golden Eagles (4–1) – Game summary

Quarter	1	2	3	4	Total
Paladins	0	3	5	7	15
No. 15 Golden Eagles	7	7	0	6	20

at Tucker Stadium • Cookeville, Tennessee

- Date: October 10
- Game time: 2:30 p.m.
- Game weather: Rain
- Game attendance: 3,260
- Referee: Jake Grombach
- TV announcers (ESPN+): Jacob Vinson (play-by-play) and Sam Brooks (analyst)

Game information

First quarter

- TNTC - Tre' Holloway 5-yard pass from Jax Leatherwood (Carter Brown kick), 11:43. Golden Eagles 7–0. Drive: 13 plays, 75 yards, 8:45.

Second quarter

- FUR - Nathan Chapman 31-yard field goal, 9:47. Golden Eagles 7–3. Drive: 11 plays, 67 yards, 5:12.
- TNTC - M.J. Flowers 1-yard run (Carter Brown kick), 0:31. Golden Eagles 14–3. Drive: 13 plays, 85 yards, 5:17.

Third quarter

- FUR - Connor Adams blocked punt for safety, 14:19. Golden Eagles 14–5. Drive: 3 plays, 0 yards, 1:41.
- FUR - Nathan Champan 53-yard field goal, 4:47. Golden Eagles 14–8. Drive: 13 plays, 49 yards, 5:53.

Fourth quarter

- TNTC - Carter Brown 52-yard field goal, 13:45. Golden Eagles 17–8. Drive: 6 plays, 17 yards, 2:30.
- FUR - Luke Shields 23-yard pass from Connor Ackerly (Nathan Chapman kick), 8:30. Golden Eagles 17–15. Drive: 6 plays, 51 yards, 1:42.
- TNTC - Carter Brown 52-yard field goal, 2:50. Golden Eagles 20–15. Drive: 9 plays, 39 yards, 3:52.

Statistics	FUR	TNTC
First downs	20	16
Plays–yards	72–289	60–285
Rushes–yards	33–67	24–73
Passing yards	222	212
Passing: comp–att–int	24–39–0	24–36–0
Turnovers	0	1
Time of possession	29:12	30:48

Team	Category	Player	Statistics
Furman	Passing	Connor Ackerly	24/39, 222 yards, TD
Furman	Rushing	Ben Croasdale	15 carries, 33 yards
Furman	Receiving	Luke Shields	7 receptions, 87 yards, TD
Tennessee Tech	Passing	Jax Leatherwood	24/36, 212 yards, TD
Tennessee Tech	Rushing	M. J. Flowers	15 carries, 70 yards, TD
Tennessee Tech	Receiving	Gabe Nunez	5 receptions, 60 yards

=== Eastern Kentucky ===
Eastern Kentucky Colonels (2–4) at No. 15 Tennessee Tech Golden Eagles (5–1) – Game summary

Quarter	1	2	3	4	Total
Colonels	7	0	0	13	20
No. 15 Golden Eagles	7	21	14	7	49

at Tucker Stadium • Cookeville, Tennessee

- Date: October 17
- Game time: 1:30 p.m.
- TV: ESPN+

Game information

First quarter

- TNTC - Tre' Holloway 36-yard pass from Jax Leatherwood (Carter Brown kick), 12:38. Golden Eagles 7–0. Drive: 4 plays, 56 yards, 2:10.
- EKU - Jeffrey Kinley 95-yard interception return (Devin Orr kick), 2:24. Tied 7–7. Drive: 8 plays, 62 yards, 4:41.

Second quarter

- TNTC - Qua Ashley 2-yard run (Carter Brown kick), 9:23. Golden Eagles 14–7. Drive: 7 plays, 51 yards, 3:32.
- TNTC - Jameson Wharton 21-yard interception return (Carter Brown kick), 8:39. Golden Eagles 21–7. Drive: 2 plays, -2 yards, 0:41.
- TNTC - Eric Weatherly 19-yard pass from Jax Leatherwood (Carter Brown kick), 0:22. Golden Eagles 28–7. Drive: 13 plays, 76 yards, 3:06.

Third quarter

- TNTC - M. J. Flowers 7-yard run (Carter Brown kick), 11:52. Golden Eagles 35–7. Drive: 3 plays, 34 yards, 1:30.
- TNTC - Qua Ashley 42-yard run (Carter Brown kick), 6:11. Golden Eagles 42–7. Drive: 8 plays, 65 yards, 4:48.

Fourth quarter

- TNTC - Tre' Holloway 4-yard pass from Jax Leatherwood (Carter Brown kick), 11:03. Golden Eagles 49–7. Drive: 11 plays, 68 yards, 6:48.
- EKU - Ryder Hooks 18-yard run (Devin Orr kick), 7:44. Golden Eagles 49–14. Drive: 6 plays, 75 yards, 3:15.
- EKU - Blake Kendall Jr. 1-yard run, 0:00. Golden Eagles 49–20. Drive: 8 plays, 80 yards, 1:52.

Statistics	EKU	TNTC
First downs	14	29
Plays–yards	50–301	68–453
Rushes–yards	38–267	36–238
Passing yards	34	215
Passing: comp–att–int	5–12–2	24–32–1
Turnovers	2	1
Time of possession	24:42	35:18

Team	Category	Player	Statistics
Eastern Kentucky	Passing	Jordyn Potts	5/12, 34 yards, 2 INT
Eastern Kentucky	Rushing	Ryder Hooks	10 carries, 166 yards, TD
Eastern Kentucky	Receiving	Camerton Hergott	2 receptions, 17 yards
Tennessee Tech	Passing	Jax Leatherwood	22/30, 199 yards, 3 TD, INT
Tennessee Tech	Rushing	M. J. Flowers	13 carries, 108 yards, TD
Tennessee Tech	Receiving	Tre' Holloway	7 receptions, 78 yards, 2TD

=== at The Citadel ===
No. 12 Tennessee Tech Golden Eagles (6–1) at The Citadel Bulldogs (2–5) – Game summary

Quarter	1	2	3	4	Total
No. 12 Golden Eagles	0	14	7	7	28
Bulldogs	3	7	0	3	13

at Johnson Hagood Stadium • Charleston, South Carolina

- Date: October 24
- Game time: 1:00 p.m.
- Game attendance: 8,527
- TV: ESPN+

Game information

First quarter

- CIT - Evan Kiely 53-yard field goal, 5:04. Bulldogs 3–0. Drive: 12 plays, 42 yards, 6:09.

Second quarter

- TNTC - Tre' Holloway 13-yard pass from Jax Leatherwood (Carter Brown kick), 14:54. Golden Eagles 7–3. Drive: 9 plays, 73 yards, 5:05.
- CIT - JJ Fludd 78-yard fumble return (Evan Kiely kick), 6:40. Bulldogs 10–7. Drive: 6 plays, 48 yards, 3:39.
- TNTC - Tre' Holloway 52-yard pass from Jax Leatherwood (Carter Brown kick), 5:06. Golden Eagles 14–10. Drive: 3 plays, 63 yards, 1:28.

Third quarter

- TNTC - M. J. Flowers 9-yard run (Carter Brown kick), 14:07. Golden Eagles 21–10. Drive: 1 play, 9 yards, 0:06.

Fourth quarter

- CIT - Evan Kiely 33-yard field goal, 5:33. Golden Eagles 21–13. Drive: 11 plays, 82 yards, 6:17.
- TNTC - M. J. Flowers 27-yard run (Carter Brown kick), 2:12. Golden Eagles 28–13. Drive: 7 plays, 73 yards, 3:15.

Statistics	TNTC	CIT
First downs	19	11
Plays–yards	54–387	51–190
Rushes–yards	29–147	39–181
Passing yards	240	9
Passing: comp–att–int	20–25–0	5–12–0
Turnovers	2	1
Time of possession	29:20	30:40

Team	Category	Player	Statistics
Tennessee Tech	Passing	Jax Leatherwood	20/25, 240 yards, 2 TD
Tennessee Tech	Rushing	M. J. Flowers	19 carries, 124 yards, 2 TD
Tennessee Tech	Receiving	Tre' Holloway	5 receptions, 128 yards, 2 TD
The Citadel	Passing	Nick Billoups	4/9, 8 yards
The Citadel	Rushing	Nick Billoups	10 carries, 74 yards
The Citadel	Receiving	Whit Hobgood	1 reception, 5 yards

=== at No. 17 East Tennessee State ===
No. 11 Tennessee Tech Golden Eagles (7–1) at No. 17 East Tennessee State Buccaneers (6–2) – Game summary

Quarter	1	2	3	4	Total
No. 11 Golden Eagles	7	7	0	10	24
No. 17 Buccaneers	7	10	0	0	17

at William B. Greene Jr. Stadium • Johnson City, Tennessee

- Date: October 31
- Game time: 2:30 p.m.
- Game attendance: 9,437

Game information

First quarter

- TNTC - M. J. Flowers 6-yard run (Carter Brown kick), 8:48. Golden Eagles 7–0. Drive: 11 plays, 63 yards, 6:04.
- ETSU - TJ Peyton 45-yard run (Ewan Johnson kick), 0:55. Tied 7–7. Drive: 9 plays, 92 yards, 3:45.

Second quarter

- ETSU - Jason Albritton 1-yard run (Ewan Johnson kick), 8:39. Buccaneers 14–7. Drive: 11 plays, 65 yards, 4:39.
- ETSU - Ewan Johnson 38-yard field goal, 4:05. Buccaneers 17–7. Drive: 7 plays, 17 yards, 3:31.
- TNTC - Qua Ashley 12-yard run (Carter Brown kick), 2:21. Buccaneers 17–14. Drive: 3 plays, 41 yards, 1:33.

Third quarter

- No scoring plays

Fourth quarter

- TNTC - Carter Brown 33-yard field goal, 14:07. Tied 17–17. Drive: 12 plays, 77 yards, 5:56.
- TNTC - Jax Leatherwood 1-yard run (Carter Brown kick), 4:08. Golden Eagles 24–17. Drive: 12 plays, 90 yards, 7:03.

Statistics	TNTC	ETSU
First downs	17	19
Plays–yards	57–328	73–321
Rushes–yards	29–110	41–207
Passing yards	218	114
Passing: comp–att–int	18–28–0	15–32–0
Turnovers	0	0
Time of possession	30:24	29:36

Team	Category	Player	Statistics
Tennessee Tech	Passing	Jax Leatherwood	18/28, 218 yards
Tennessee Tech	Rushing	M. J. Flowers	15 carries, 65 yards, TD
Tennessee Tech	Receiving	Eric Weatherly	5 receptions, 82 yards
East Tennessee State	Passing	Mason Mims	15/32, 114 yards
East Tennessee State	Rushing	TJ Peyton	18 carries, 123 yards, TD
East Tennessee State	Receiving	Suderian Harrison	5 receptions, 39 yards

=== VMI ===
VMI Keydets (0–9) at No. 9 Tennessee Tech Golden Eagles (8–1) – Game summary

Quarter	1	2	3	4	Total
Keydets	0	7	7	0	14
No. 9 Golden Eagles	7	35	7	17	66

at Tucker Stadium • Cookeville, Tennessee

- Date: November 7
- Game time: 1:30 p.m.

Game information

First quarter

- TNTC - Eric Weatherley 29-yard pass from Jax Leatherwood (Carter Brown kick), 10:49. Golden Eagles 7–0. Drive: 6 plays, 61 yards, 3:14.

Second quarter

- TNTC - Eric Weatherley 29-yard pass from Jax Leatherwood (Carter Brown kick), 9:51. Golden Eagles 14–0. Drive: 11 plays, 66 yards, 5:24.
- VMI - Leo Boehling 37-yard run (Jack Joyce kick), 6:59. Golden Eagles 14–7. Drive: 5 plays, 75 yards, 2:52.
- TNTC - M. J. Flowers 8-yard run (Carter Brown kick), 6:40. Golden Eagles 21–7. Drive: 1 play, 8 yards, 0:07.
- TNTC - Lazaro Rodriguez 21-yard pass from Jax Leatherwood (Carter Brown kick), 5:18. Golden Eagles 28–7. Drive: 1 play, 21 yards, 0:04.
- TNTC - Gabe Nunez 34-yard pass from Jax Leatherwood (Carter Brown kick), 2:44. Golden Eagles 35–7. Drive: 2 plays, 35 yards, 0:44.
- TNTC - Maury Sullivan 24-yard pass from Jax Leatherwood (Carter Brown kick), 0:44. Golden Eagles 42–7. Drive: 7 plays, 60 yards, 1:01.

Third quarter

- TNTC - Qua Ashley 6-yard run (Carter Brown kick), 9:13. Golden Eagles 49–7. Drive: 9 plays, 48 yards, 5:39.
- VMI - Cade Cox 17-yard pass from JoJo Crump (Jack Joyce kick), 2:25. Golden Eagles 49–14. Drive: 5 plays, 32 yards, 2:40.

Fourth quarter

- TNTC - Carter Brown 25-yard field goal, 12:43. Golden Eagles 52–14. Drive: 9 plays, 57 yards, 4:38.
- TNTC - Aidan Littles 43-yard run (Carter Brown kick), 9:46. Golden Eagles 59–14. Drive: 3 plays, 54 yards, 1:23.
- TNTC - Ahmad Haston 7-yard run (Carter Brown kick), 5:50. Golden Eagles 66–14. Drive: 6 plays, 48 yards, 3:41.

Statistics	VMI	TNTC
First downs	8	26
Plays–yards	50–173	67–522
Rushes–yards	39–109	37–194
Passing yards	64	328
Passing: comp–att–int	4–11–2	23–30–0
Turnovers	3	0
Time of possession	27:01	32:59

Team	Category	Player	Statistics
VMI	Passing	JoJo Crump	4/7, 64 yards, TD, 2 INT
VMI	Rushing	Leo Boehling	16 carries, 81 yards, TD
VMI	Receiving	Cole Varner	1 reception, 41 yards
Tennessee Tech	Passing	Jax Leatherwood	21/28, 312 yards, 5 TD
Tennessee Tech	Rushing	M. J. Flowers	17 carries, 69 yards, TD
Tennessee Tech	Receiving	Eric Weatherley	7 receptions, 112 yards, 2 TD

=== No. 13 Mercer ===
No. 13 Mercer Bears (8–2) at No. 9 Tennessee Tech Golden Eagles (9–1) – Game summary

Quarter	1	2	3	4	Total
No. 13 Bears	0	0	0	0	0
No. 9 Golden Eagles	0	0	0	0	0

at Tucker Stadium • Cookeville, Tennessee

- Date: November 14
- Game time: 1:30 p.m.

Game information

First quarter
Second quarter
Third quarter
Fourth quarter

Statistics	MER	TNTC
First downs		
Plays–yards		
Rushes–yards		
Passing yards		
Passing: comp–att–int		
Turnovers		
Time of possession		

Team	Category	Player	Statistics
Mercer	Passing		
Mercer	Rushing		
Mercer	Receiving		
Tennessee Tech	Passing		
Tennessee Tech	Rushing		
Tennessee Tech	Receiving		

=== at Mississippi State (FBS) ===
No. 13 Tennessee Tech Golden Eagles (9–2) at Mississippi State Bulldogs (4–6) – Game summary

Quarter	1	2	3	4	Total
No. 13 Golden Eagles	0	0	0	0	0
Bulldogs (FBS)	0	0	0	0	0

at Davis Wade Stadium • Starkville, Mississippi

- Date: November 21
- Game time: 12:00 p.m.

Game information

First quarter
Second quarter
Third quarter
Fourth quarter

Statistics	TNTC	MSST
First downs		
Plays–yards		
Rushes–yards		
Passing yards		
Passing: comp–att–int		
Turnovers		
Time of possession		

Team	Category	Player	Statistics
Tennessee Tech	Passing		
Tennessee Tech	Rushing		
Tennessee Tech	Receiving		
Mississippi State	Passing		
Mississippi State	Rushing		
Mississippi State	Receiving		

== Rankings ==
Ranking movements Legend: ██ Increase in ranking ██ Decrease in ranking
	Week														
Poll	Pre	1	2	3	4	5	6	7	8	9	10	11	12	13	Final
STATS	14	12	12	13	12	9	15	15	12	11	9	9	13		
Coaches	15	13	11	10	10	8	16	14	11	10	9	9	12		
