= 2026 East Tennessee State Buccaneers football team =

American college football season

2026 East Tennessee State Buccaneers football
- Conference: Southern Conference
- Record: 7–5 (5–3 SoCon)
- Head coach: Will Healy (2nd season)
- Offensive coordinator: Brian Blackmon (1st season)
- Defensive coordinator: Chad Staggs (2nd season)
- Home stadium: William B. Greene Jr. Stadium

2026 Southern Conference football standings
	Conf.			Overall
Team	W		L	W		L
No. 9 Mercer +	6	–	1	9	–	2
No. 13 Tennessee Tech	6	–	2	9	–	2
Chattanooga	6	–	2	7	–	4
East Tennessee State	5	–	2	7	–	4
Western Carolina	4	–	3	6	–	5
Samford	4	–	4	4	–	7
Wofford	3	–	5	5	–	6
Furman	2	–	5	3	–	8
The Citadel	1	–	6	3	–	8
VMI	0	–	7	0	–	11
+ – Conference co-champions; As of November 22, 2026; Rankings from STATS Poll

The 2026 East Tennessee State Buccaneers football team will represent East Tennessee State University as a member of the Southern Conference (SoCon) during the 2026 NCAA Division I FCS football season. The Buccaneers will be led by second-year head coach Will Healy and play at the William B. Greene Jr. Stadium in Johnson City, Tennessee.

== Schedule ==
Date	Time	Opponent	Rank	Site	TV	Result	Attendance
August 29	5:30 p.m.	Campbell*		William B. Greene Jr. Stadium; Johnson City, TN	ESPN+	L 37–49	9,132
September 5	12:00 p.m.	Tusculum*		William B. Greene Jr. Stadium; Johnson City, TN	ESPN+	W 48–14	7,111
September 12	12:00 p.m.	at North Carolina*		Kenan Stadium; Chapel Hill, NC	ACCN	L 3–35	42,362
September 19	12:00 p.m.	West Georgia*		William B. Greene Jr. Stadium; Johnson City, TN	ESPN+	W 35–27	5,103
September 26	3:30 p.m.	Western Carolina		William B. Greene Jr. Stadium; Johnson City, TN	ESPN+	W 58–31	9,204
October 3	3:30 p.m.	Chattanooga		William B. Greene Jr. Stadium; Johnson City, TN	ESPN+	W 14–3	7,103
October 10	2:00 p.m.	at The Citadel	No. 24	Johnson Hagood Stadium; Charleston, SC	ESPN+	W 34–16	10,323
October 24	1:30 p.m.	at VMI	No. 18	Alumni Memorial Field; Lexington, VA	ESPN+	W 38–0	5,296
October 31	3:30 p.m.	No. 11 Tennessee Tech^{†}	No. 17	William B. Greene Jr. Stadium; Johnson City, TN	ESPN+	L 17–24	9,437
November 7	1:00 p.m.	Samford	No. 19т	William B. Greene Jr. Stadium; Johnson City, TN	ESPN+	L 35–37	7,845
November 14	1:30 p.m.	at Wofford		Gibbs Stadium; Spartanburg, SC	ESPN+	W 20–17	4,783
November 21	3:00 p.m.	at No. 9 Mercer		Five Star Stadium; Macon, GA	ESPN+	L 25–28 ^{OT}	4,468
*Non-conference game; ^{†}Homecoming; Rankings from STATS Poll released prior to the game; All times are in Eastern time

== Game summaries ==
=== Campbell ===
Campbell Fighting Camels (0–0) at East Tennessee State Buccaneers (0–0) – Game summary

Quarter	1	2	3	4	Total
Fighting Camels	14	14	7	14	49
Buccaneers	7	17	0	13	37

at William B. Greene Jr. Stadium • Johnson City, TN

- Date: August 29
- Game time: 5:30 PM EDT
- Game weather: Sunny • Temperature: 83 °F (28 °C) • Wind: NW at 4 miles per hour (6.4 km/h)
- Game attendance: 9,132
- Referee: Brian Hilpisch
- TV announcers (ESPN+): Keith Brake (play-by-play), Mark Hutsell (analyst), Kennedy Story (sideline)
- Box Score

Game information

First quarter

- (12:07) CAM – Evan Austin 30-yard pass from Kamden Sixkiller, Alex Crabb kick (Drive: 8 plays, 75 yards, 2:53; Fighting Camels 7–0)
- (6:32) ETSU – Trey Weary 18-yard pass from Mason Mims, Ewan Johnson kick (Drive: 3 plays, 76 yards, 1:21; Tied 7–7)
- (0:31) CAM – Ethan Lawrence 3-yard run, Alex Crabb kick (Drive: 12 plays, 75 yards, 6:01; Fighting Camels 14–7)

Second quarter

- (13:49) ETSU – Jason Albritton 6-yard run, Ewan Johnson kick (Drive: 4 plays, 75 yards, 1:42; Tied 14–14)
- (10:25) ETSU – TJ Peyton 3-yard run, Ewan Johnson kick (Drive: 5 plays, 45 yards, 2:17; Buccaneers 21–14)
- (6:20) CAM – Kamden Sixkiller 5-yard run, Alex Crabb kick (Drive: 7 plays, 75 yards, 4:05; Tied 21–21)
- (0:25) CAM – Stevie Keener 26-yard pass from Kamden Sixkiller, Alex Crabb kick (Drive: 6 plays, 64 yards, 1:23; Fighting Camels 28–21)
- (0:00) ETSU – Ewan Johnson 44-yard field goal (Drive: 5 plays, 48 yards, 0:25; Fighting Camels 28–24)

Third quarter

- (0:28) CAM – Devon Thomas 2-yard run, Alex Crabb kick (Drive: 6 plays, 65 yards, 2:57; Fighting Camels 35–24)

Fourth quarter

- (14:16) CAM – Devon Thomas 1-yard run, Alex Crabb kick (Drive: 1 plays, 1 yards, 0:05; Fighting Camels 42–24)
- (10:34) ETSU – D'Marius Rucker 4-yard run (Drive: 9 plays, 65 yards, 3:42; Fighting Camels 42–30)
- (5:34) ETSU – Brandon Winton 6-yard pass from Mason Mims, Ewan Johnson kick (Drive: 10 plays, 80 yards, 4:03; Fighting Camels 42–37)
- (1:53) CAM – Kamden Sixkiller 14-yard run, Alex Crabb kick (Drive: 6 plays, 82 yards, 3:41; Fighting Camels 49–37)

Statistics	CAM	ETSU
First downs	24	27
Plays–yards	73–514	74–528
Rushes–yards	31–171	33–155
Passing yards	343	373
Passing: Comp–Att–Int	29–42–0	33–41–0
Turnovers	0	2
Time of possession	32:53	27:07

Team	Category	Player	Statistics
Campbell	Passing	Kamden Sixkiller	29/42, 343 yards, 2 TD
Campbell	Rushing	Kamden Sixkiller	10 carries, 95 yards, 2 TD
Campbell	Receiving	Evan Austin	4 receptions, 93 yards, TD
East Tennessee State	Passing	Mason Mims	33/41, 373 yards, 2 TD
East Tennessee State	Rushing	TJ Peyton	15 carries, 80 yards, TD
East Tennessee State	Receiving	Suderian Harrison	5 receptions, 99 yards

=== Tusculum (DII) ===
Tusculum Pioneers (DII) (1–0) at East Tennessee State Buccaneers (0–1) – Game summary

Quarter	1	2	3	4	Total
Pioneers (DII)	7	0	0	7	14
Buccaneers	13	7	14	14	48

at William B. Greene Jr. Stadium • Johnson City, TN

- Date: September 5
- Game time: 12:00 PM EDT
- Game weather: Sunny • Temperature: 86 °F (30 °C) • Wind: E at 3 miles per hour (4.8 km/h)
- Game attendance: 7,111
- Referee: Jason Graham
- TV announcers (ESPN+): Keith Brake (play-by-play), Mark Hutsell (analyst), Kennedy Story (sideline)
- Box Score

Game information

First quarter

- (14:13) ETSU – Suderian Harrison 55-yard pass from Mason Mims, Ewan Johnson kick (Drive: 3 plays, 59 yards, 0:39; Buccaneers 7–0)
- (2:24) TUSC – Cam Ferguson 1-yard run, Max Turan kick (Drive: 8 plays, 60 yards, 4:18; Tied 7–7)
- (0:10) ETSU – TJ Peyton 41-yard run (Drive: 5 plays, 64 yards, 2:03; Buccaneers 13–7)

Second quarter

- (1:26) ETSU – TJ Peyton 1-yard run, Ewan Johnson kick (Drive: 6 plays, 55 yards, 1:37; Buccaneers 20–7)

Third quarter

- (9:25) ETSU – Brandon Winton 45-yard pass from Mason Mims, Ewan Johnson kick (Drive: 5 plays, 73 yards, 2:20; Buccaneers 27–7)
- (5:44) ETSU – Charlie Browder 31-yard pass from Mason Mims, Ewan Johnson kick (Drive: 4 plays, 70 yards, 1:35; Buccaneers 34–7)

Fourth quarter

- (6:25) ETSU – Jason Albritton 1-yard run, Ewan Johnson kick (Drive: 9 plays, 85 yards, 4:58; Buccaneers 41–7)
- (3:20) TUSC – Lavante Adams 57-yard run, Max Turan kick (Drive: 5 plays, 82 yards, 2:58; Buccaneers 41–14)
- (0:22) ETSU – D'Marius Rucker 10-yard run, Ewan Johnson kick (Drive: 6 plays, 35 yards, 2:46; Buccaneers 48–14)

Statistics	TUSC	ETSU
First downs	14	21
Plays–yards	64–321	57–484
Rushes–yards	49–212	34–225
Passing yards	109	259
Passing: Comp–Att–Int	7–15–0	15–23–1
Turnovers	0	1
Time of possession	36:45	23:15

Team	Category	Player	Statistics
Tusculum	Passing	Tedros Gleaton	7/15, 109 yards
Tusculum	Rushing	Lavante Adams	1 carry, 57 yards, TD
Tusculum	Receiving	Zion Job	1 reception, 45 yards
East Tennessee State	Passing	Mason Mims	13/21, 242 yards, 3 TD, INT
East Tennessee State	Rushing	TJ Peyton	11 carries, 121 yards, 2 TD
East Tennessee State	Receiving	Suderian Harrison	3 receptions, 71 yards, TD

=== at North Carolina (FBS) ===
East Tennessee State Buccaneers (1–1) at North Carolina Tar Heels (FBS) (1–0) – Game summary

Quarter	1	2	3	4	Total
Buccaneers	0	0	0	3	3
Tar Heels (FBS)	7	14	14	0	35

at Kenan Stadium • Chapel Hill, NC

- Date: September 12
- Game time: 12:00 p.m.
- Game weather: Cloudy • Temperature: 82 °F (28 °C) • Wind: NE at 1 mile per hour (1.6 km/h)
- Game attendance: 42,362
- Referee: Garrett Dickerson
- TV announcers (ACCN): Roxy Bernstein, Dave Clawson and Madison Hock
- Box Score

Game information

First quarter

- UNC – Jelani Thurman 24-yard pass from Billy Edwards Jr. (Aeron Burrell kick), 9:48. Tar Heels 7–0. Drive: 3 plays, 58 yards, 1:19.

Second quarter

- UNC – Benjamin Hall 26-yard pass from Billy Edwards Jr. (Aeron Burrell kick), 12:13. Tar Heels 14–0. Drive: 10 plays, 99 yards, 4:53.
- UNC – Demon June 9-yard run (Aeron Burrell kick), 1:20. Tar Heels 21–0. Drive: 4 plays, 57 yards, 1:27.

Third quarter

- UNC – Demon June 6-yard run (Aeron Burrell kick), 13:10. Tar Heels 28–0. Drive: 4 plays, 36 yards, 1:44.
- UNC – Demon June 1-yard run (Aeron Burrell kick), 3:30. Tar Heels 35–0. Drive: 10 plays, 92 yards, 5:51.

Fourth quarter

- ETSU – Ewan Johnson 41-yard field goal, 3:57. Tar Heels 35–3. Drive: 15 plays, 46 yards, 8:09.

Statistics	ETSU	UNC
First downs	16	23
Plays–yards	67–255	53–427
Rushes–yards	35–77	27–161
Passing yards	178	266
Passing: comp–att–int	23–32–1	18–26–0
Turnovers	2	0
Time of possession	33:44	26:16

Team	Category	Player	Statistics
East Tennessee State	Passing	Mason Mims	23/31, 178 yards, INT
East Tennessee State	Rushing	TJ Peyton	13 carries, 52 yards
East Tennessee State	Receiving	Charlie Browder	3 receptions, 50 yards
North Carolina	Passing	Billy Edwards Jr.	15/20, 244 yards, 2 TD
North Carolina	Rushing	Benjamin Hall	4 carries, 49 yards
North Carolina	Receiving	Jelani Thurman	4 receptions, 71 yards, TD

=== West Georgia ===
West Georgia Wolves (0–3) at East Tennessee State Buccaneers (1–2) – Game summary

Quarter	1	2	3	4	Total
Wolves	0	10	14	3	27
Buccaneers	7	14	7	7	35

at William B. Greene Jr. Stadium • Johnson City, TN

- Date: September 19
- Game time: 12:00 PM EDT
- Game weather: Sunny • Temperature: 81 °F (27 °C) • Wind: W at 2 miles per hour (3.2 km/h)
- Game attendance: 5,103
- Referee: Todd Boyd
- TV announcers (ESPN+): Keith Brake (play-by-play), Mark Hutsell (analyst), Kennedy Story (sideline)
- Box Score

Game information

First quarter

- ETSU - Jason Albritton 6-yard run (Ewan Johnson kick), 2:04. Buccaneers 7–0. Drive: 18 plays, 80 yards, 7:13.

Second quarter

- UWG - Malik Leverett 1-yard pass from Colton Fitzgerald (Logan Lopez kick), 10:54. Tied 7–7. Drive: 11 plays, 75 yards, 6:10.
- UWG - Logan Lopez 46-yard field goal, 9:36. Wolves 10–7. Drive: 4 plays, -4 yards, 1:15.
- ETSU - TJ Peyton 14-yard run (Ewan Johnson kick), 6:21. Buccaneers 14–10. Drive: 7 plays, 73 yards, 3:08.
- ETSU - Vashawn Nails 8-yard pass from Mason Mims (Ewan Johnson kick), 2:00. Buccaneers 21–10. Drive: 7 plays, 80 yards, 2:36.

Third quarter

- UWG - Josh Suchuchts 6-yard pass from Colton Fitzgerald (Logan Lopez kick), 12:22. Buccaneers 21–17. Drive: 7 plays, 75 yards, 2:38.
- UWG - T.J. Lockley 9-yard pass from Colton Fitzgerald (Logan Lopez kick), 5:15. Wolves 24–21. Drive: 13 plays, 80 yards, 5:43.
- ETSU - Mike Jenkins 25-yard interception return from Colton Fitzgerald (Ewan Johnson kick), 0:31. Buccaneers 28–24. Drive: 2 plays, 1 yard, 0:21.

Fourth quarter

- ETSU - Brandon Winton 88-yard pass from Mason Mims (Ewan Johnson kick), 6:10. Buccaneers 35–24. Drive: 3 plays, 85 yards, 0:53.
- UWG - Logan Lopez 29-yard field goal, 3:37. Buccaneers 35–27. Drive: 9 plays, 64 yards, 2:33.

Statistics	UWG	ETSU
First downs	21	18
Total yards	411	387
Rushing yards	64	179
Passing yards	347	198
Passing: Comp–Att–Int	30–53–1	15–24–0
Time of possession	32:17	27:43

Team	Category	Player	Statistics
West Georgia	Passing	Colton Fitzgerald	29/50, 324 yards, 3 TD, INT
West Georgia	Rushing	Justin Montgomery	16 carries, 55 yards
West Georgia	Receiving	Brody Jones	7 receptions, 109 yards
East Tennessee State	Passing	Mason Mims	15/24, 198 yards, 2 TD
East Tennessee State	Rushing	TJ Peyton	17 carries, 94 yards, TD
East Tennessee State	Receiving	Brandon Winton	2 receptions, 96 yards, TD

=== Western Carolina ===
Western Carolina Catamounts (2–2) at East Tennessee State Buccaneers (2–2) – Game summary

Quarter	1	2	3	4	Total
Catamounts	0	7	7	17	31
Buccaneers	14	20	10	14	58

at William B. Greene Jr. Stadium • Johnson City, TN

- Date: September 26
- Game time: 3:30 p.m. EST
- Game weather: Sunny • Temperature: 73 °F (23 °C) • Wind: S at 4 miles per hour (6.4 km/h)
- Game attendance: 9,204
- Referee: Michael Gervais
- TV announcers (ESPN+): Pete Yanity (play-by-play), Jeremy Greene (analyst), Dave Friedman (sideline reporter)
- Box Score

Game information

First quarter

- (5:35) ETSU – D'Marius Rucker 2-yard run, Ewan Johnson kick (Drive: 16 plays, 63 yards, 6:50; Buccaneers 7–0)
- (0:02) ETSU – Jason Albritton 2-yard run, Ewan Johnson kick (Drive: 10 plays, 48 yards, 3:58; Buccaneers 14–0)

Second quarter

- (10:36) ETSU – Ewan Johnson 33-yard field goal (Drive: 8 plays, 57 yards, 3:42; Buccaneers 17–0)
- (6:05) ETSU – Jason Albritton 3-yard run, Ewan Johnson kick (Drive: 6 plays, 53 yards, 1:56; Buccaneers 24–0)
- (1:54) ETSU – Ewan Johnson 49-yard field goal (Drive: 6 plays, 29 yards, 2:15; Buccaneers 27–0)
- (1:11) WCU – Lex Thomas 37-yard run, Bryan McCollum kick (Drive: 6 plays, 75 yards, 0:43; Buccaneers 27–7)
- (0:32) ETSU – Charlie Browder 12-yard pass from Mason Mims, Ewan Johnson (Drive: 4 plays, 73 yards, 0:32; Buccaneers 34–7)

Third quarter

- (11:22) ETSU – Ewan Johnson 43-yard field goal (Drive: 9 plays, 49 yards, 3:38; Buccaneers 37–7)
- (8:50) ETSU – TJ Peyton 1-yard run, Ewan Johnson kick (Drive: 4 plays, 34 yards, 1:09; Buccaneers 44–7)
- (3:00) WCU – Lex Thomas 5-yard run, Bryan McCollum kick (Drive: 12 plays, 65 yards, 5:00; Buccaneers 44–14)

Fourth quarter

- (14:07) WCU – Bryan McCollum 26-yard field goal (Drive: 8 plays, 34 yards, 2:06; Buccaneers 44–17)
- (11:29) ETSU – Jason Albritton 3-yard run, Ewan Johnson kick (Drive: 5 plays, 46 yards, 2:33; Buccaneers 51–17)
- (6:33) WCU – Lex Thomas 10-yard run, Bryan McCollum kick (Drive: 15 plays, 82 yards, 4:50; Buccaneers 51–24)
- (4:10) ETSU – Jaiden Daniels 1-yard run, Ewan Johnson kick (Drive: 5 plays, 75 yards, 2:23; Buccaneers 58–24)
- (0:19) WCU – Carlos Santana 8-yard pass from Patrick Harding, Bryan McCollum kick (Drive: 14 plays, 75 yards, 3:51; Buccaneers 58–31)

Statistics	WCU	ETSU
First downs	23	27
Total yards	368	542
Rushing yards	181	233
Passing yards	187	309
Passing: Comp–Att–Int	20–38–0	24–31–0
Turnovers	0	0
Time of possession	28:46	31:14

Team	Category	Player	Statistics
Western Carolina	Passing	Lex Thomas	16/32, 163 yards
Western Carolina	Rushing	Lex Thomas	11 carries, 52 yards, 3 TD
Western Carolina	Receiving	AJ Colombo	5 receptions, 60 yards
East Tennessee State	Passing	Mason Mims	20/27, 220 yards, TD
East Tennessee State	Rushing	TJ Peyton	16 carries, 102 yards, TD
East Tennessee State	Receiving	Trey Weary	4 receptions, 60 yards

=== Chattanooga ===
Chattanooga Mocs (3–2) at East Tennessee State Buccaneers (3–2) – Game summary

Quarter	1	2	3	4	Total
Mocs	3	0	0	0	3
Buccaneers	7	0	0	7	14

at William B. Greene Jr. Stadium • Johnson City, TN

- Date: October 3
- Game time: 3:30 p.m. EDT
- Game weather: Cloudy • Temperature: 73 °F (23 °C) • Wind: S at 3 miles per hour (4.8 km/h)
- Game attendance: 7,103
- Referee: Jake Grombach
- TV announcers (ESPN+): Keith Brake (play-by-play), Mark Hutsell (analyst) and Kennedy Story (sideline)
- Box Score

Game information

First quarter

- (9:16) UTC – Jude Kelley 47-yard field goal (Drive: 10 plays, 41 yards, 4:35; Mocs 3–0)
- (5:54) ETSU – Jason Albritton 1-yard run, Ewan Johnson kick (Drive: 10 plays, 75 yards, 3:22; Buccaneers 7–3)

Second quarter

- No scoring plays

Third quarter

- No scoring plays

Fourth quarter

- (13:12) ETSU – TJ Peyton 20-yard pass from Mason Mims, Ewan Johnson kick (Drive: 12 plays, 90 yards, 5:29; Buccaneers 14–3)

Statistics	UTC	ETSU
First downs	10	20
Total yards	183	345
Rushing yards	108	159
Passing yards	75	186
Passing: Comp–Att–Int	9–21–0	15–25–1
Turnovers	1	1
Time of possession	27:50	32:10

Team	Category	Player	Statistics
Chattanooga	Passing	Battle Alberson	9/21, 75 yards
Chattanooga	Rushing	Kevin Lalin	16 carries, 55 yards
Chattanooga	Receiving	Ashton Schumann	5 receptions, 54 yards
East Tennessee State	Passing	Mason Mims	15/25, 186 yards, TD, INT
East Tennessee State	Rushing	Jason Albritton	21 carries, 95 yards, TD
East Tennessee State	Receiving	Brandon Winton	3 receptions, 57 yards

=== at The Citadel ===
No. 24 East Tennessee State Buccaneers (4–2) at The Citadel Bulldogs (2–3) – Game summary

Quarter	1	2	3	4	Total
No. 24 Buccaneers	0	10	17	7	34
Bulldogs	10	0	0	6	16

at Johnson Hagood Stadium • Charleston, SC

- Date: October 10
- Game time: 2:00 p.m. EST
- Game weather: Rain • Temperature: 78 °F (26 °C)
- Game attendance: 10,323
- Referee: Jason Graham
- TV announcers (ESPN+): Pete Yanity (play-by-play), Jay Sonnhalter (analyst), Dave Friedman (sideline reporter)
- Box Score

Game information

First quarter

- (6:31) CIT – Quentin Hayes 17-yard run, Evan Kiely kick (Drive: 13 plays, 84 yards, 8:29; Bulldogs 7–0)
- (0:55) CIT – Evan Kiely 29-yard field goal (Drive: 7 plays, 51 yards, 3:47; Bulldogs 10–0)

Second quarter

- (13:14) ETSU – CJ Gilmore 4-yard fumble recovery, Ewan Johnson kick (Bulldogs 10–7)
- (3:11) ETSU – Ewan Johnson 25-yard field goal (Drive: 11 plays, 44 yards, 5:06; Tied 10–10)

Third quarter

- (10:03) ETSU – Ewan Johnson 26-yard field goal (Drive: 10 plays, 66 yards, 4:57; Buccaneers 13–10)
- (9:03) ETSU – Josh Buckhalter 9-yard punt return, Ewan Johnson kick (Buccaneers 20–10)
- (3:05) ETSU – TJ Peyton 85-yard run, Ewan Johnson kick (Drive: 3 plays, 93 yards, 0:46; Buccaneers 27–10)

Fourth quarter

- (8:32) ETSU – Vashawn Nalls 1-yard pass from Mason Mims, Ewan Johnson kick (Drive: 11 plays, 57 yards, 5:44; Buccaneers 34–10)
- (3:55) CIT – Isaiah Jonson 15-yard pass from Xavier Hill (Drive: 4 plays, 23 yards, 2:10; Buccaneers 34–16)

Statistics	ETSU	CIT
First downs	14	13
Total yards	311	259
Rushing yards	159	126
Passing yards	152	133
Passing: Comp–Att–Int	15–23–0	7–18–0
Turnovers	2	2
Time of possession	25:40	34:20

Team	Category	Player	Statistics
East Tennessee State	Passing	Mason Mims	14/21, 154 yards, TD
East Tennessee State	Rushing	TJ Peyton	9 carries, 110 yards, TD
East Tennessee State	Receiving	Suderian Harrison	5 receptions, 91 yards
The Citadel	Passing	Xavier Hill	3/6, 81 yards, TD
The Citadel	Rushing	Gavin Garcia	19 carries, 70 yards
The Citadel	Receiving	Braylon Knauth	3 receptions, 73 yards

=== at VMI ===
No. 18 East Tennessee State Buccaneers (5–2) at VMI Keydets (0–7) – Game summary

Quarter	1	2	3	4	Total
No. 18 Buccaneers	7	10	7	14	38
Keydets	0	0	0	0	0

at Alumni Memorial Field • Lexington, VA

- Date: October 24
- Game time: 1:30 p.m. EDT
- Game weather: Sunny
- Game attendance: 5,296
- Referee: Todd Boyd
- TV announcers (ESPN+): Wade Branner (play-by-play), Chip Tarkenton (analyst) and Phil Marcello (sideline)
- Box Score

Game information

First quarter

- (1:19) ETSU – Khristian Means 19-yard pass from Mason Mims, Ewan Johnson kick (Drive: 8 plays, 59 yards, 3:12; East Tennessee State 7–0)

Second quarter

- (6:49) ETSU – Ewan Johnson 37-yard field goal (Drive: 10 plays, 60 yards, 4:46; East Tennessee State 10–0)
- (2:29) ETSU – Tyler Griffin 23-yard pass from Mason Mims, Ewan Johnson kick (Drive: 5 plays, 35 yards, 2:35; East Tennessee State 17–0)

Third quarter

- (7:09) ETSU – Jason Albritton 7-yard run, Ewan Johnson kick (Drive: 8 plays, 66 yards, 3:20; East Tennessee State 24–0)

Fourth quarter

- (12:43) ETSU – Tyler Griffin 13-yard pass from Suderian Harrison, Ewan Johnson kick (Drive: 14 plays, 86 yards, 7:38; East Tennessee State 31–0)
- (6:10) ETSU – TJ Peyton 28-yard run, Ethan Lane kick (Drive: 11 plays, 78 yards, 4:34; East Tennessee State 38–0)

Statistics	ETSU	VMI
First downs	32	6
Plays–yards	78–482	42–143
Rushes–yards	45–272	37–130
Passing yards	210	13
Passing: comp–att–int	26–33–0	2–5–0
Turnovers	0	0
Time of possession	34:32	25:28

Team	Category	Player	Statistics
East Tennessee State	Passing	Mason Mims	22/25, 173 yards, 2 TD
East Tennessee State	Rushing	TJ Peyton	15 carries, 121 yards, TD
East Tennessee State	Receiving	Tyler Griffin	7 receptions, 56 yards, 2 TD
VMI	Passing	Ian Reynolds	2/5, 13 yards
VMI	Rushing	JoJo Crump	5 carries, 54 yards
VMI	Receiving	Traveion Slaughter	1 reception, 12 yards

=== No. 11 Tennessee Tech ===
No. 11 Tennessee Tech Golden Eagles (7–1) at No. 17 East Tennessee State Buccaneers (6–2) – Game summary

Quarter	1	2	3	4	Total
No. 11 Golden Eagles	7	7	0	10	24
No. 17 Buccaneers	7	10	0	0	17

at William B. Greene Jr. Stadium • Johnson City, TN

- Date: October 31
- Game time: 3:30 p.m. EDT
- Game attendance: 9,437
- TV: ESPN+

Game information

First quarter

- TNTC - M. J. Flowers 6-yard run (Carter Brown kick), 8:48. Golden Eagles 7–0. Drive: 11 plays, 63 yards, 6:04.
- ETSU - TJ Peyton 45-yard run (Ewan Johnson kick), 0:55. Tied 7–7. Drive: 9 plays, 92 yards, 3:45.

Second quarter

- ETSU - Jason Albritton 1-yard run (Ewan Johnson kick), 8:39. Buccaneers 14–7. Drive: 11 plays, 65 yards, 4:39.
- ETSU - Ewan Johnson 38-yard field goal, 4:05. Buccaneers 17–7. Drive: 7 plays, 17 yards, 3:31.
- TNTC - Qua Ashley 12-yard run (Carter Brown kick), 2:21. Buccaneers 17–14. Drive: 3 plays, 41 yards, 1:33.

Third quarter

- No scoring plays

Fourth quarter

- TNTC - Carter Brown 33-yard field goal, 14:07. Tied 17–17. Drive: 12 plays, 77 yards, 5:56.
- TNTC - Jax Leatherwood 1-yard run (Carter Brown kick), 4:08. Golden Eagles 24–17. Drive: 12 plays, 90 yards, 7:03.

Statistics	TNTC	ETSU
First downs	17	19
Total yards	328	321
Rushing yards	110	207
Passing yards	218	114
Passing: Comp–Att–Int	18–28–0	15–32–0
Time of possession	30:24	29:36

Team	Category	Player	Statistics
Tennessee Tech	Passing	Jax Leatherwood	18/28, 218 yards
Tennessee Tech	Rushing	M. J. Flowers	15 carries, 65 yards, TD
Tennessee Tech	Receiving	Eric Weatherly	5 receptions, 82 yards
East Tennessee State	Passing	Mason Mims	15/32, 114 yards
East Tennessee State	Rushing	TJ Peyton	18 carries, 123 yards, TD
East Tennessee State	Receiving	Suderian Harrison	5 receptions, 39 yards

=== Samford ===
Samford Bulldogs (3–6) at No. 19т East Tennessee State Buccaneers (6–3) – Game summary

Quarter	1	2	3	4	Total
Bulldogs	0	0	0	0	0
No. 19т Buccaneers	0	0	0	0	0

at William B. Greene Jr. Stadium • Johnson City, TN

- Date: November 7
- Game time: 1:00 p.m. EDT
- TV: ESPN+

Statistics	SAM	ETSU
First downs		
Total yards		
Rushing yards		
Passing yards		
Passing: Comp–Att–Int		
Time of possession		

Team	Category	Player	Statistics
Samford	Passing		
Samford	Rushing		
Samford	Receiving		
East Tennessee State	Passing		
East Tennessee State	Rushing		
East Tennessee State	Receiving		

=== at Wofford ===
East Tennessee State Buccaneers (6–4) at Wofford Terriers (5–5) – Game summary

Quarter	1	2	3	4	Total
Buccaneers	0	0	0	0	0
Terriers	0	0	0	0	0

at Gibbs Stadium • Spartanburg, SC

- Date: November 14
- Game time: 1:30 p.m. EDT
- TV: ESPN+

Statistics	ETSU	WOF
First downs		
Total yards		
Rushing yards		
Passing yards		
Passing: Comp–Att–Int		
Time of possession		

Team	Category	Player	Statistics
East Tennessee State	Passing		
East Tennessee State	Rushing		
East Tennessee State	Receiving		
Wofford	Passing		
Wofford	Rushing		
Wofford	Receiving		

=== at No. 9 Mercer ===
East Tennessee State Buccaneers (7–4) at No. 9 Mercer Bears (9–2) – Game summary

Quarter	1	2	3	4	Total
Buccaneers	0	0	0	0	0
No. 9 Bears	0	0	0	0	0

at Five Star Stadium • Macon, GA

- Date: November 21
- Game time: 3:00 p.m. EDT
- TV: ESPN+

Statistics	ETSU	MER
First downs		
Total yards		
Rushing yards		
Passing yards		
Passing: Comp–Att–Int		
Time of possession		

Team	Category	Player	Statistics
East Tennessee State	Passing		
East Tennessee State	Rushing		
East Tennessee State	Receiving		
Mercer	Passing		
Mercer	Rushing		
Mercer	Receiving		

== Rankings ==
Ranking movements Legend: ██ Increase in ranking ██ Decrease in ranking — = Not ranked RV = Received votes т = Tied with team above or below
	Week														
Poll	Pre	1	2	3	4	5	6	7	8	9	10	11	12	13	Final
STATS	RV	—	—	—	—	—	24	20	18	17	19т	RV			
Coaches	RV	RV	RV	—	—	—	RV	24	20	18	21	RV			
