= 2026 West Florida Argonauts football team =

American college football season

2026 West Florida Argonauts football
- Conference: United Athletic Conference
- Record: 5–5 (2–5 UAC)
- Head coach: Kaleb Nobles (4th season)
- Offensive coordinator: Donny Baker (2nd season)
- Offensive scheme: Spread option
- Defensive coordinator: Kavell Conner (4th season)
- Base defense: Multiple 4–3 / 4–2–5
- Home stadium: Pen Air Field

2026 United Athletic Conference standings
	Conf.			Overall
Team	W		L	W		L
No. 1 Tarleton State $^	7	–	0	12	–	0
No. 19 Abilene Christian	5	–	2	6	–	6
No. 14 Austin Peay	4	–	3	8	–	4
North Alabama	4	–	3	7	–	5
Central Arkansas	3	–	4	5	–	7
Eastern Kentucky	3	–	4	4	–	8
West Florida*	2	–	5	5	–	5
West Georgia*	0	–	7	1	–	11
^ – FCS playoff participant; * – Ineligible for UAC title and FCS postseason play due to transition from NCAA Division II.; As of November 22, 2026; Rankings from STATS Poll

The 2026 West Florida Argonauts football team represented the University of West Florida as a member of the United Athletic Conference (UAC) during the 2026 NCAA Division I FCS football season. The Argonauts were led by fourth-year head coach Kaleb Nobles and played their home games at Pen Air Field in Pensacola, Florida.

This was West Florida’s first season competing at the NCAA Division I Football Championship Subdivision (FCS) level after previously competing in NCAA Division II as a member of the Gulf South Conference. As part of the NCAA reclassification process, the Argonauts were eligible for the UAC championship but were not eligible for the NCAA Division I FCS playoffs until the 2029 season.

== Schedule ==
Date	Time	Opponent	Rank	Site	TV	Result	Attendance
August 27	6:00 p.m.	No. 16 Southern Illinois*		Pen Air Field; Pensacola, FL	ESPN+	W 34–31	6,124
September 5	6:00 p.m.	at Central Arkansas	No. 25	Estes Stadium; Conway, AR	ESPN+	W 42–14	5,138
September 19	6:00 p.m.	No. 14т Austin Peay	No. 17	Pen Air Field; Pensacola, FL	ESPN+	L 16–38	5,712
September 26	6:00 p.m.	at Southeast Missouri State*	No. 20	Houck Stadium; Cape Girardeau, MO	ESPN+	W 20–17	5,236
October 3	7:00 p.m.	at Abilene Christian	No. 17	Wildcat Stadium; Abilene, TX	ESPN+	L 7–35	7,018
October 10	4:00 p.m.	Northeastern State*		Pen Air Field; Pensacola, FL	ESPN+	Cancelled (Note: The game between Northeastern State and West Florida has been cancelled in advance of the arrival of Hurricane Isaias.)	
October 17	1:00 p.m.	No. 21 (DII) West Alabama*		Pen Air Field; Pensacola, FL	ESPN+	W 37–3	3,554
October 24	2:00 p.m.	at Eastern Kentucky		Roy Kidd Stadium; Richmond, KY	ESPN+	L 13–16	6,281
November 7	6:00 p.m.	at North Alabama		Bank Independent Stadium; Florence, AL	ESPN+	L 21–28	9,357
November 14	2:00 p.m.	No. 1 Tarleton State		Pen Air Field; Pensacola, FL	ESPN+	L 17–31	6,400
November 21	1:00 p.m.	at West Georgia		University Stadium; Carrollton, GA (Borderline Brawl)	ESPN+	W 24–16	2,156
*Non-conference game; Rankings from STATS Poll released prior to the game; All times are in Central time

== Rankings ==
Ranking movements Legend: ██ Increase in ranking ██ Decrease in ranking — = Not ranked RV = Received votes
	Week														
Poll	Pre	1	2	3	4	5	6	7	8	9	10	11	12	13	Final
STATS	—	25	20	17	20	17	RV	RV	RV	—	—	—	—		
Coaches	—	RV	22	17	20	18	RV	RV	23	—	—	—	—		

== Game summaries ==
=== No. 16 Southern Illinois ===
No. 16 Southern Illinois Salukis (0–0) at West Florida Argonauts (0–0) – Game summary

Quarter	1	2	3	4	Total
No. 16 Salukis	3	6	8	14	31
Argonauts	7	13	7	7	34

at Pen Air Field • Pensacola, Florida

- Date: August 27
- Game time: 6:00 p.m.
- Game weather: Sunny • Temperature: 86 °F (30 °C)
- Game attendance: 6,124
- Referee: Zach Erdmann
- TV announcers (ESPN+): Will Kennedy (play-by-play) and Fred Robbins (analyst)

Game information

First quarter

- SIU – Seth Adams 31-yard field goal, 5:30. Salukis 3–0. Drive: 10 plays, 60 yards, 5:02.
- UWF – Ty'ray Davis 45-yard run (Brogan Woeber kick), 1:13. Argonauts 7–3. Drive: 8 plays, 82 yards, 4:12.

Second quarter

- SIU – Seth Adams 50-yard field goal, 13:36. Argonauts 7–6. Drive: 9 plays, 45 yards, 2:31.
- UWF – Jakari Mozelle 19-yard pass from Ty'ray Davis (run failed), 9:48. Argonauts 13–6. Drive: 7 plays, 69 yards, 3:39.
- UWF – A'Khoury Lyde 44-yard interception return (Brogan Woeber kick), 4:40. Argonauts 20–6.
- SIU – Seth Adams 47-yard field goal, 0:08. Argonauts 20–9. Drive: 11 plays, 46 yards, 4:32.

Third quarter

- UWF – Markel Townsend 9-yard run (Brogan Woeber kick), 7:27. Argonauts 27–9. Drive: 8 plays, 77 yards, 4:43.
- SIU – Kyle Thomas 18-yard pass from Jake Curry (Jake Curry–Lem Wash pass), 2:25. Argonauts 27–17. Drive: 7 plays, 61 yards, 3:09.

Fourth quarter

- SIU – Jake Curry 19-yard run (Seth Adams kick), 7:39. Argonauts 27–24. Drive: 8 plays, 63 yards, 4:25.
- UWF – Luc Carroll 22-yard pass from Ty'ray Davis (Brogan Woeber kick), 2:37. Argonauts 34–24. Drive: 6 plays, 43 yards, 3:45.
- SIU – Kyle Thomas 8-yard pass from Jake Curry (Seth Adams kick), 1:10. Argonauts 34–31. Drive: 9 plays, 73 yards, 1:21.

Statistics	SIU	UWF
First downs	22	16
Plays–yards	79–403	57–335
Rushes–yards	41–216	40–226
Passing yards	187	109
Passing: comp–att–int	17–38–3	7–17–0
Turnovers	4	3
Time of possession	32:37	27:23

Team	Category	Player	Statistics
Southern Illinois	Passing	Jake Curry	13/29, 153 yards, 2 TD, 3 INT
Southern Illinois	Rushing	Chandler Chapman	10 carries, 75 yards
Southern Illinois	Receiving	Kyle Thomas	4 receptions, 61 yards, 2 TD
West Florida	Passing	Ty'ray Davis	7/17, 109 yards, 2 TD
West Florida	Rushing	Ty'ray Davis	18 carries, 88 yards, TD
West Florida	Receiving	Jakari Mozelle	3 receptions, 40 yards, TD

=== at Central Arkansas ===
No. 25 West Florida Argonauts (1–0) at Central Arkansas Bears (1–0) – Game summary

Quarter	1	2	3	4	Total
No. 25 Argonauts	14	14	14	0	42
Bears	0	7	7	0	14

at Estes Stadium • Conway, Arkansas

- Date: September 5
- Game time: 6:00 p.m.
- Game weather: Sunny
- Game attendance: 5,138
- Referee: Gabriel Tomlin
- TV announcers (ESPN+): Dylan McLemore (play-by-play) and Wess Moore (analyst)

Game information

First quarter

- UWF – Ty'ray Davis 7-yard run (Brogan Woeber kick), 13:09. Argonauts 7–0. Drive: 1 play, 7 yards, 3:54.
- UWF – TJ Lane 3-yard run (Brogan Woeber kick), 3:19. Argonauts 14–0. Drive: 5 plays, 47 yards, 2:45.

Second quarter

- CARK – Donovyn Omolo 44-yard run (Caleb Jones kick), 11:44. Argonauts 14–7. Drive: 6 plays, 99 yards, 3:07.
- UWF – Brite Cannon 35-yard pass from Ty'ray Davis (Brogan Woeber kick), 5:51. Argonauts 21–7. Drive: 5 plays, 46 yards, 2:43.
- UWF – Tyler Dostin 8-yard pass from Ty'ray Davis (Brogan Woeber kick), 1:49. Argonauts 28–7. Drive: 7 plays, 35 yards, 3:23.

Third quarter

- UWF – A'Khoury Lyde 37-yard interception return (Brogan Woeber kick), 14:32. Argonauts 35–7.
- UWF – Gage Armbruster 42-yard pass from Ty'ray Davis (Brogan Woeber kick), 7:56. Argonauts 42–7. Drive: 9 plays, 83 yards, 4:40.
- CARK – James Jointer Jr. 24-yard pass from Donovyn Omolo (Caleb Jones kick), 4:11. Argonauts 42–14. Drive: 9 plays, 75 yards, 3:45.

Fourth quarter

- No scoring plays.

Statistics	UWF	CARK
First downs	20	19
Plays–yards	63–404	57–347
Rushes–yards	40–156	26–150
Passing yards	248	197
Passing: comp–att–int	17–23–0	21–31–1
Turnovers	0	3
Time of possession	32:10	27:50

Team	Category	Player	Statistics
West Florida	Passing	Ty'ray Davis	14/17, 227 yards, 3 TD
West Florida	Rushing	Ty'ray Davis	9 carries, 75 yards, TD
West Florida	Receiving	Gage Armbruster	2 receptions, 80 yards, TD
Central Arkansas	Passing	Donovyn Omolo	21/31, 197 yards, TD, INT
Central Arkansas	Rushing	Donovyn Omolo	17 carries, 125 yards, TD
Central Arkansas	Receiving	Tyrell Pollard	4 receptions, 62 yards

=== No. 14т Austin Peay ===
No. 14т Austin Peay Governors (2–1) at No. 17 West Florida Argonauts (2–0) – Game summary

Quarter	1	2	3	4	Total
No. 14т Governors	14	14	0	10	38
No. 17 Argonauts	0	10	6	0	16

at Pen Air Field • Pensacola, Florida

- Date: September 19
- Game time: 6:00 p.m.
- Game weather: Sunny • Temperature: 90 °F (32 °C)
- Game attendance: 5,712
- Referee: Matt Jones
- TV announcers (ESPN+): Will Kennedy (play-by-play) and Fred Robbins (analyst)

Game information

First quarter

- APSU – Jaden Robinson 61-yard pass from Chris Parson (Hamilton DiBoyan kick), 10:28. Governors 7–0. Drive: 5 plays, 77 yards, 1:26.
- APSU – Denver Harper 41-yard run (Hamilton DiBoyan kick), 7:36. Governors 14–0. Drive: 5 plays, 54 yards, 2:11.

Second quarter

- APSU – Chris Parson 10-yard run (Hamilton DiBoyan kick), 14:52. Governors 21–0. Drive: 4 plays, 50 yards, 1:45.
- UWF – Ty'ray Davis 10-yard run (Reid Grek kick), 12:08. Governors 21–7. Drive: 6 plays, 76 yards, 2:38.
- APSU – Courtland Simmons 5-yard run (Hamilton DiBoyan kick), 5:09. Governors 28–7. Drive: 5 plays, 76 yards, 2:16.
- UWF – Reid Grek 18-yard field goal, 0:00. Governors 28–10. Drive: 4 plays, 18 yards, 1:08.

Third quarter

- UWF – Avery Giddens 1-yard pass from Ty'ray Davis (kick failed), 7:56. Governors 28–16. Drive: 11 plays, 83 yards, 6:58.

Fourth quarter

- APSU – Hamilton DiBoyan 37-yard field goal, 6:42. Governors 31–16. Drive: 9 plays, 53 yards, 5:37.
- APSU – Justin Wimpye 70-yard interception return (Hamilton DiBoyan kick), 4:26. Governors 38–16.

Statistics	APSU	UWF
First downs	19	14
Plays–yards	62–384	64–313
Rushes–yards	46–235	38–164
Passing yards	149	149
Passing: comp–att–int	7–16–0	12–26–2
Turnovers	0	3
Time of possession	30:20	29:40

Team	Category	Player	Statistics
Austin Peay	Passing	Chris Parson	7/16, 149 yards, TD
Austin Peay	Rushing	Courtland Simmons	17 carries, 78 yards, TD
Austin Peay	Receiving	Jaden Robinson	2 receptions, 108 yards, TD
West Florida	Passing	Ty'ray Davis	8/14, 118 yards, TD, INT
West Florida	Rushing	Markel Townsend	9 carries, 93 yards
West Florida	Receiving	Tyshon Mansell	1 reception, 48 yards

=== at Southeast Missouri State ===
No. 20 West Florida Argonauts (2–1) at Southeast Missouri State Redhawks (2–2) – Game summary

Quarter	1	2	3	4	Total
No. 20 Argonauts	3	3	7	7	20
Redhawks	3	7	0	7	17

at Houck Stadium • Cape Girardeau, Missouri

- Date: September 26
- Game time: 6:00 p.m.
- Game weather: Sunny
- Game attendance: 5,236
- Referee: Branden McClain
- TV announcers (ESPN+): Erik Sean (play-by-play) and Rick Wieser (analyst)

Game information

First quarter

- SEMO – Justin Keller 42-yard field goal, 11:20. Redhawks 3–0. Drive: 7 plays, 51 yards, 3:40.
- UWF – Reid Grek 32-yard field goal, 6:57. Tied 3–3. Drive: 4 plays, 3 yards, 1:50.

Second quarter

- UWF – Reid Grek 46-yard field goal, 6:39. Argonauts 6–3. Drive: 8 plays, 44 yards, 2:36.
- SEMO – Teagan Cobb 6-yard run (Justin Keller kick), 2:35. Redhawks 10–6. Drive: 7 plays, 75 yards, 4:04.

Third quarter

- UWF – Christian Ware-Terry 5-yard fumble recovery (Reid Grek kick), 1:29. Argonauts 13–10.

Fourth quarter

- UWF – Jake Robinette 20-yard pass from Donovan Leary (Reid Grek kick), 14:52. Argonauts 20–10. Drive: 2 plays, 20 yards, 0:17.
- SEMO – Jobe Bryant 2-yard pass from Braylen Ragland (Justin Keller kick), 8:32. Argonauts 20–17. Drive: 14 plays, 75 yards, 6:20.

Statistics	UWF	SEMO
First downs	15	19
Plays–yards	58–194	72–268
Rushes–yards	22–39	47–106
Passing yards	155	162
Passing: comp–att–int	16–36–1	14–25–3
Turnovers	1	6
Time of possession	25:01	34:59

Team	Category	Player	Statistics
West Florida	Passing	Donovan Leary	16/36, 155 yards, TD, INT
West Florida	Rushing	Markel Townsend	13 carries, 31 yards
West Florida	Receiving	Tyshon Mansell	3 receptions, 43 yards
Southeast Missouri State	Passing	Braylen Ragland	14/25, 162 yards, TD, 3 INT
Southeast Missouri State	Rushing	Khyair Spain	16 carries, 77 yards
Southeast Missouri State	Receiving	Tristin Purnell	4 receptions, 80 yards

=== at Abilene Christian ===
No. 17 West Florida Argonauts (3–1) at Abilene Christian Wildcats (1–4) – Game summary

Quarter	1	2	3	4	Total
No. 17 Argonauts	0	0	0	7	7
Wildcats	7	21	0	7	35

at Anthony Field at Wildcat Stadium • Abilene, Texas

- Date: October 3
- Game time: 7:00 p.m.
- Game weather: Cloudy • Temperature: 74 °F (23 °C)
- Game attendance: 7,018
- Referee: Zach Erdmann
- TV announcers (ESPN+): Andy Penney (play-by-play) and De'Andre Brown (analyst)

Game information

First quarter

- ACU – Jonathan French-Love 31-yard pass from Tucker Parks (Brandon Perez kick), 0:28. Wildcats 7–0. Drive: 5 plays, 66 yards, 2:25.

Second quarter

- ACU – Rovaughn Banks Jr. 30-yard run (Brandon Perez kick), 10:56. Wildcats 14–0. Drive: 6 plays, 73 yards, 3:14.
- ACU – Deonte Dean 14-yard run (Brandon Perez kick), 6:39. Wildcats 21–0. Drive: 6 plays, 51 yards, 3:14.
- ACU – Jayden York 8-yard pass from Tucker Parks (Brandon Perez kick), 0:37. Wildcats 28–0. Drive: 4 plays, 73 yards, 1:36.

Third quarter

- No scoring plays.

Fourth quarter

- UWF – Jakari Mozelle 22-yard pass from Ty'ray Davis (Reid Grek kick), 5:17. Wildcats 28–7. Drive: 2 plays, 80 yards, 0:55.
- ACU – Bryan Henry 9-yard pass from Tucker Parks (Brandon Perez kick), 1:33. Wildcats 35–7. Drive: 8 plays, 45 yards, 3:44.

Statistics	UWF	ACU
First downs	15	20
Plays–yards	65–328	55–349
Rushes–yards	34–120	38–194
Passing yards	208	155
Passing: comp–att–int	16–31–0	16–17–0
Turnovers	1	1
Time of possession	31:07	28:53

Team	Category	Player	Statistics
West Florida	Passing	Ty'ray Davis	16/31, 208 yards, TD
West Florida	Rushing	Markel Townsend	12 carries, 98 yards
West Florida	Receiving	Tyshon Mansell	2 receptions, 67 yards
Abilene Christian	Passing	Tucker Parks	16/17, 155 yards, 3 TD
Abilene Christian	Rushing	Tucker Parks	15 carries, 97 yards
Abilene Christian	Receiving	Jayden York	4 receptions, 56 yards, TD

=== vs. No. 21 (DII) West Alabama ===
No. 21 (DII) West Alabama Tigers (5–1) at West Florida Argonauts (3–2) – Game summary

Quarter	1	2	3	4	Total
No. 21 (DII) Tigers	0	0	0	3	3
Argonauts	6	17	7	7	37

at Pen Air Field • Pensacola, Florida

- Date: October 17
- Game time: 1:00 p.m.
- Game weather: Sunny • Temperature: 65 °F (18 °C) • Wind: S 30 mph
- Game attendance: 3,554
- Referee: Drew Ison
- TV announcers (ESPN+): Will Kennedy (play-by-play) and Fred Robbins (analyst)

Game information

First quarter

- UWF – Ty'ray Davis 8-yard run (Reid Grek kick failed), 2:10. Argonauts 6–0. Drive: 5 plays, 78 yards, 2:34.

Second quarter

- UWF – Reid Grek 30-yard field goal, 14:41. Argonauts 9–0. Drive: 4 plays, 0 yards, 0:50.
- UWF – Dylan Lloyd 0-yard fumble recovery (Reid Grek kick), 3:55. Argonauts 16–0. Drive: 3 plays, 40 yards, 1:37.
- UWF – Ty'ray Davis 3-yard run (Reid Grek kick), 0:36. Argonauts 23–0. Drive: 6 plays, 56 yards, 2:27.

Third quarter

- UWF – Tyshon Mansell 9-yard pass from Ty'ray Davis (Reid Grek kick), 10:23. Argonauts 30–0. Drive: 4 plays, 40 yards, 2:23.

Fourth quarter

- UWA – Elijah Guyton 43-yard field goal, 11:43. Argonauts 30–3. Drive: 4 plays, −3 yards, 0:56.
- UWF – Tyler Dostin 4-yard pass from Donovan Leary (Reid Grek kick), 5:48. Argonauts 37–3. Drive: 12 plays, 75 yards, 5:55.

Statistics	UWA	UWF
First downs	6	26
Plays–yards	44–29	73–528
Rushes–yards	24–(−16)	45–329
Passing yards	45	199
Passing: comp–att–int	7–20–0	18–28–1
Turnovers	0	2
Time of possession	22:24	37:36

Team	Category	Player	Statistics
West Alabama	Passing	Luther Richesson	5/13, 16 yards
West Alabama	Rushing	Brayden Jenkins	8 carries, 5 yards
West Alabama	Receiving	Eoin Walsh	1 reception, 26 yards
West Florida	Passing	Ty'ray Davis	10/16, 99 yards, TD
West Florida	Rushing	Ty'ray Davis	12 carries, 126 yards, 2 TD
West Florida	Receiving	Tyshon Mansell	4 receptions, 27 yards, TD

=== at Eastern Kentucky ===
West Florida Argonauts (4–2) at Eastern Kentucky Colonels (2–5) – Game summary

Quarter	1	2	3	4	Total
Argonauts	0	10	3	0	13
Colonels	7	3	3	3	16

at Roy Kidd Stadium • Richmond, Kentucky

- Date: October 24
- Game time: 2:00 p.m.
- Game weather: Sunny • Temperature: 72 °F (22 °C) • Wind: W at 2 miles per hour (3.2 km/h)
- Game attendance: 6,281
- Referee: Mike Lennie
- TV announcers (ESPN+): Wes Chandler (play-by-play), Jonathan Duff (analyst) and Michelle Knezovic (sideline)

Game information

First quarter

- (12:14) EKU – Elijah Caldwell 4-yard pass from Blake Kendall, Devin Orr kick (Drive: 4 plays, 54 yards, 1:56; Eastern Kentucky 7–0)

Second quarter

- (11:55) EKU – Devin Orr 34-yard field goal (Drive: 8 plays, 35 yards, 5:10; Eastern Kentucky 10–0)
- (0:58) UWF – Luc Carroll 15-yard pass from Ty'ray Davis, Reid Grek kick (Drive: 9 plays, 80 yards, 1:51; Eastern Kentucky 10–7)
- (0:00) UWF – Reid Grek 43-yard field goal (Drive: 2 plays, 30 yards, 0:16; Tied 10–10)

Third quarter

- (12:01) UWF – Reid Grek 38-yard field goal (Drive: 5 plays, 9 yards, 1:27; West Florida 13–10)
- (4:59) EKU – Devin Orr 36-yard field goal (Drive: 4 plays, 8 yards, 1:30; Tied 13–13)

Fourth quarter

- (9:01) EKU – Devin Orr 33-yard field goal (Drive: 5 plays, 16 yards, 2:10; Eastern Kentucky 16–13)

Statistics	UWF	EKU
First downs	14	11
Plays–yards	55–225	64–261
Rushes–yards	23–88	37–50
Passing yards	137	211
Passing: comp–att–int	14–32–0	17–27–0
Turnovers	2	1
Time of possession	24:24	35:36

Team	Category	Player	Statistics
West Florida	Passing	Ty'ray Davis	14/32, 137 yards, TD
West Florida	Rushing	Ty'ray Davis	13 carries, 45 yards
West Florida	Receiving	Tyshon Mansell	6 receptions, 80 yards
Eastern Kentucky	Passing	Blake Kendall	16/26, 163 yards, TD
Eastern Kentucky	Rushing	Blake Hensley	15 carries, 30 yards
Eastern Kentucky	Receiving	Jayden West	2 receptions, 68 yards

=== at North Alabama ===
West Florida Argonauts (4–3) at North Alabama Lions (5–3) – Game summary

Quarter	1	2	3	4	Total
Argonauts	7	0	7	7	21
Lions	7	14	7	0	28

at Bank Independent Stadium • Florence, Alabama

- Date: November 7
- Game time: 6:03 p.m.
- Game weather: Clear • Temperature: 49 °F (9 °C)
- Game attendance: 9,357
- Referee: John Kellermeier
- TV announcers (ESPN+): Benjamin Ray (play-by-play), Bryan Neece (analyst) and Gyvan Hammons (sideline)

Game information

First quarter

- UWF – Keishawn Smith 16-yard pass from Ty'Ray Davis (Reid Grek kick), 7:08. Argonauts 7–0. Drive: 9 plays, 75 yards, 4:11.
- UNA – Snap Reed 48-yard pass from Destin Wade (Ian Vachon kick), 5:00. Tied 7–7. Drive: 4 plays, 78 yards, 2:04.

Second quarter

- UNA – Roderick Taylor Jr. 45-yard run (Ian Vachon kick), 7:43. Lions 14–7. Drive: 9 plays, 61 yards, 6:11.
- UNA – Destin Wade 1-yard run (Ian Vachon kick), 3:44. Lions 21–7. Drive: 7 plays, 80 yards, 3:00.

Third quarter

- UWF – Roderick Webb 60-yard interception return (Reid Grek kick), 14:08. Lions 21–14.
- UNA – Xavier Johnson 45-yard pass from Destin Wade (Ian Vachon kick), 12:13. Lions 28–14. Drive: 4 plays, 75 yards, 1:55.

Fourth quarter

- UWF – Luc Carroll 28-yard pass from Ty'Ray Davis (Reid Grek kick), 7:33. Lions 28–21. Drive: 8 plays, 73 yards, 4:34.

Statistics	UWF	UNA
First downs	22	18
Plays–yards	68–413	58–438
Rushes–yards	33–105	39–244
Passing yards	308	194
Passing: comp–att–int	22–35–1	12–19–2
Turnovers	1	2
Time of possession	30:13	29:47

Team	Category	Player	Statistics
West Florida	Passing	Ty'Ray Davis	22/35, 308 yards, 2 TD, INT
West Florida	Rushing	Keishawn Smith	13 carries, 53 yards
West Florida	Receiving	Luc Carroll	6 receptions, 85 yards, TD
North Alabama	Passing	Destin Wade	12/19, 194 yards, 2 TD, 2 INT
North Alabama	Rushing	Destin Wade	16 carries, 109 yards, TD
North Alabama	Receiving	Snap Reed	6 receptions, 117 yards, TD

=== No. 1 Tarleton State ===
No. 1 Tarleton State Texans (10–0) at West Florida Argonauts (4–4) – Game summary

Quarter	1	2	3	4	Total
No. 1 Texans	14	14	0	3	31
Argonauts	3	7	0	7	17

at Pen Air Field • Pensacola, Florida

- Date: November 14
- Game time: 2:02 p.m.
- Game weather: Sunny • Temperature: 60 °F (16 °C)
- Game attendance: 6,400
- Referee: Drew Myers
- TV announcers (ESPN+): Will Kennedy (play-by-play), Fred Robbins (analyst), and Justin McGinnis (sideline)

Game information

First quarter

- UWF – Reid Grek 23-yard field goal, 10:24. Argonauts 3–0. Drive: 10 plays, 69 yards, 4:36.
- TSU – Danny Joiner 25-yard pass from Kaden Anderson (Alejandro De La Poza kick), 8:27. Texans 7–3. Drive: 6 plays, 65 yards, 1:57.
- TSU – Marquis Willis 50-yard pass from Kaden Anderson (Alejandro De La Poza kick), 4:47. Texans 14–3. Drive: 5 plays, 70 yards, 1:57.

Second quarter

- UWF – Ty'Ray Davis 1-yard run (Reid Grek kick), 13:00. Texans 14–10. Drive: 9 plays, 61 yards, 2:34.
- TSU – James Paige 3-yard run (Alejandro De La Poza kick), 9:28. Texans 21–10. Drive: 8 plays, 67 yards, 3:25.
- TSU – James Paige 2-yard run (Alejandro De La Poza kick), 0:37. Texans 28–10. Drive: 7 plays, 80 yards, 1:14.

Third quarter

- No scoring plays.

Fourth quarter

- UWF – Keishawn Smith 46-yard pass from Ty'Ray Davis (Reid Grek kick), 8:17. Texans 28–17. Drive: 10 plays, 80 yards, 3:02.
- TSU – Alejandro De La Poza 19-yard field goal, 5:32. Texans 31–17. Drive: 7 plays, 62 yards, 2:39.

Statistics	TAR	UWF
First downs	26	18
Plays–yards	82–559	66–382
Rushes–yards	44–300	24–121
Passing yards	259	261
Passing: comp–att–int	22–38–1	20–42–2
Turnovers	2	2
Time of possession	36:03	23:57

Team	Category	Player	Statistics
Tarleton State	Passing	Kaden Anderson	22/37, 259 yards, 2 TD, INT
Tarleton State	Rushing	Miequle Brock	11 carries, 113 yards
Tarleton State	Receiving	Marquis Willis	7 receptions, 110 yards, TD
West Florida	Passing	Ty'Ray Davis	20/42, 261 yards, TD, 2 INT
West Florida	Rushing	Ty'Ray Davis	13 carries, 76 yards, TD
West Florida	Receiving	Luc Carroll	5 receptions, 85 yards

=== West Georgia ===
West Florida Argonauts (4–5) at West Georgia Wolves (1–10) – Game summary

Quarter	1	2	3	4	Total
Argonauts	7	10	0	7	24
Wolves	0	0	16	0	16

at University Stadium • Carrollton, Georgia

- Date: November 21
- Game time: 2:02 p.m.
- Game weather: Cloudy • Temperature: 61 °F (16 °C)
- Game attendance: 2,156
- Referee: John Kellermeier
- TV announcers (ESPN+): Patrick Eidson (play-by-play) and Alvin Delve (analyst)

Game information

First quarter

- UWF – Tyshon Mansell 16-yard pass from Ty'Ray Davis (Reid Grek kick), 6:32. Argonauts 7–0. Drive: 16 plays, 89 yards, 8:24.

Second quarter

- UWF – Jake Robinette 18-yard pass from Ty'Ray Davis (Reid Grek kick), 8:23. Argonauts 14–0. Drive: 11 plays, 91 yards, 5:49.
- UWF – Reid Grek 36-yard field goal, 2:26. Argonauts 17–0. Drive: 8 plays, 40 yards, 4:30.

Third quarter

- UWG – Brody Jones 49-yard pass from Colton FitzGerald (Logan Lopez kick), 12:22. Argonauts 17–7. Drive: 5 plays, 79 yards, 2:32.
- UWG – Aidan Sefa 3-yard pass from Colton FitzGerald (kick failed), 10:37. Argonauts 17–13. Drive: 5 plays, 48 yards, 1:45.
- UWG – Logan Lopez 43-yard field goal, 5:50. Argonauts 17–16. Drive: 9 plays, 43 yards, 4:00.

Fourth quarter

- UWF – Ty'Ray Davis 3-yard run (Reid Grek kick), 3:06. Argonauts 24–16. Drive: 12 plays, 80 yards, 6:14.

Statistics	UWF	UWG
First downs	26	16
Plays–yards	73–403	55–333
Rushes–yards	36–112	25–65
Passing yards	291	268
Passing: comp–att–int	23–37–1	21–30–1
Turnovers	1	1
Time of possession	34:31	25:29

Team	Category	Player	Statistics
West Florida	Passing	Ty'Ray Davis	23/36, 291 yards, 2 TD, INT
West Florida	Rushing	Ty'Ray Davis	20 carries, 60 yards, TD
West Florida	Receiving	Tyshon Mansell	7 receptions, 97 yards, TD
West Georgia	Passing	Colton FitzGerald	21/29, 268 yards, 2 TD, INT
West Georgia	Rushing	Christian Monfort	14 carries, 61 yards
West Georgia	Receiving	T.J. Lockley	6 receptions, 104 yards
