= 2026 Austin Peay Governors football team =

American college football season

2026 Austin Peay Governors football
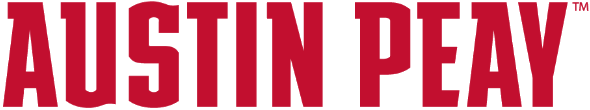
- Conference: United Athletic Conference

Ranking
- STATS: No. 14
- FCS Coaches: No. 14
- Record: 8–4 (4–3 UAC)
- Head coach: Jeff Faris (3rd season)
- Offensive coordinator: Quinn Billerman (3rd season)
- Defensive coordinator: Greg Jones (2nd season)
- Home stadium: Fortera Stadium

2026 United Athletic Conference standings
	Conf.			Overall
Team	W		L	W		L
No. 1 Tarleton State $^	7	–	0	12	–	0
No. 19 Abilene Christian	5	–	2	6	–	6
No. 14 Austin Peay	4	–	3	8	–	4
North Alabama	4	–	3	7	–	5
Central Arkansas	3	–	4	5	–	7
Eastern Kentucky	3	–	4	4	–	8
West Florida*	2	–	5	5	–	5
West Georgia*	0	–	7	1	–	11
$ – Conference champion; ^ – FCS playoff participant; * – Ineligible for UAC title and FCS postseason play due to transition from NCAA Division II.; As of November 22, 2026; Rankings from STATS Poll

The 2026 Austin Peay Governors football team will represent Austin Peay State University as a member of the United Athletic Conference (UAC) during the 2026 NCAA Division I FCS football season. The Governors will be led by third-year head coach Jeff Faris and will play their home games at Fortera Stadium in Clarksville, Tennessee.

== Schedule ==
Date	Time	Opponent	Rank	Site	TV	Result	Attendance
August 27	6:00 p.m.	Gardner–Webb*	No. 17	Fortera Stadium; Clarksville, TN	ESPN+	W 35–17	7,043
September 5	6:00 p.m.	at Vanderbilt*	No. 15	FirstBank Stadium; Nashville, TN	SECN+	L 9–28	35,000
September 12	4:00 p.m.	Morehead State*	No. 15	Fortera Stadium; Clarksville, TN	ESPN+	W 63–7	6,657
September 19	6:00 p.m.	at No. 17 West Florida	No. 14т	Pen Air Field; Pensacola, FL	ESPN+	W 38–16	5,712
September 26	1:00 p.m.	UT Martin*	No. 13	Fortera Stadium; Clarksville, TN (Sgt. York Trophy)	ESPN+	W 35–12	7,981
October 3	4:00 p.m.	New Haven*	No. 11	Fortera Stadium; Clarksville, TN	ESPN+	W 42–17	7,763
October 10	6:00 p.m.	No. 3 Tarleton State	No. 9	Fortera Stadium; Clarksville, TN	ESPN+	L 32–40	8,167
October 17	1:00 p.m.	at West Georgia	No. 12	University Stadium; Carrollton, GA	ESPN+	W 24–10	3,892
October 24	6:00 p.m.	at North Alabama	No. 9	Bank Independent Stadium; Florence, AL	ESPN+	W 27–21	12,008
November 7	4:00 p.m.	Eastern Kentucky	No. 7	Fortera Stadium; Clarksville, TN	ESPN+	W 55–31	7,524
November 14	1:00 p.m.	No. 24 Abilene Christian	No. 6	Fortera Stadium; Clarksville, TN	ESPN+	L 31–34	8,248
November 21	4:00 p.m.	at Central Arkansas	No. 14	Estes Stadium; Conway, AR	ESPN+	L 17–24	4,281
*Non-conference game; Rankings from STATS Poll released prior to the game; All times are in Central time

== Game summaries ==
=== Gardner–Webb ===
Gardner–Webb Runnin' Bulldogs (0–0) at No. 17 Austin Peay Governors (0–0) – Game summary

Quarter	1	2	3	4	Total
Runnin' Bulldogs	3	7	0	7	17
No. 17 Governors	7	14	14	0	35

at Fortera Stadium • Clarksville, Tennessee

- Date: August 27
- Game time: 6:00 p.m.
- Game weather: Sunny • Temperature: 87 °F (31 °C) • Wind: 3 6 mph
- Game attendance: 7,043
- Referee: Gabriel Tomlin
- TV announcers (ESPN+): Barry Gresham and Ethan Schmidt

Game information

First quarter

- GWEB – Tyler Simpson 36-yard field goal, 4:17. Runnin' Bulldogs 3–0. Drive: 16 plays, 73 yards, 6:08.
- APSU – Courtland Simmons 1-yard run (Nick Guagliano kick), 1:12. Governors 7–3. Drive: 7 plays, 79 yards, 2:58.

Second quarter

- GWEB – Jalile Bost 43-yard pass from Cole Pennington (Tyler Simpson kick), 14:12. Runnin' Bulldogs 10–7. Drive: 2 plays, 47 yards, 0:43.
- APSU – Isaiah Groves 1-yard run (Nick Guagliano kick), 7:08. Governors 14–10. Drive: 10 plays, 79 yards, 6:15.
- APSU – Denver Harper 49-yard pass from Chris Parson (Nick Guagliano kick), 4:34. Governors 21–10. Drive: 3 plays, 62 yards, 1:12.

Third quarter

- APSU – Chris Parson 4-yard run (Nick Guagliano kick), 8:03. Governors 28–10. Drive: 5 plays, 62 yards, 1:51.
- APSU – Courtland Simmons 19-yard run (Nick Guagliano kick), 1:58. Governors 35–10. Drive: 3 plays, 48 yards, 1:19.

Fourth quarter

- GWEB – Adrian Cormier 1-yard run (Andrew Bontekoe kick), 13:30. Governors 35–17. Drive: 11 plays, 75 yards, 3:28.

Statistics	GWEB	APSU
First downs	22	22
Plays–yards	69–344	68–483
Rushes–yards	20–32	47–175
Passing yards	312	308
Passing: comp–att–int	27–49–1	14–21–1
Turnovers	1	1
Time of possession	23:21	36:39

Team	Category	Player	Statistics
Gardner–Webb	Passing	Cole Pennington	27/49, 312 yards, TD, INT
Gardner–Webb	Rushing	Christian Vann	4 carries, 15 yards
Gardner–Webb	Receiving	Kory Jones	9 receptions, 102 yards
Austin Peay	Passing	Chris Parson	14/21, 308 yards, TD, INT
Austin Peay	Rushing	Courtland Simmons	11 carries, 73 yards, 2 TD
Austin Peay	Receiving	Denver Harper	3 receptions, 108 yards, TD

=== at Vanderbilt (FBS) ===
No. 15 Austin Peay Governors (1–0) at Vanderbilt Commodores (FBS) (0–0) – Game summary

Quarter	1	2	3	4	Total
No. 15 Governors	6	3	0	0	9
Commodores (FBS)	5	10	6	7	28

at FirstBank Stadium • Nashville, Tennessee

- Date: September 5
- Game time: 6:00 p.m.
- Game weather: Sunny • Temperature: 94 °F (34 °C) • Wind: SE at 3 miles per hour (4.8 km/h)
- Game attendance: 35,000
- Referee: Daniel Gautreaux
- TV announcers (SECN+): Courtney Lyle and Rene Ingoglia

Game information

First quarter

- VAN – Brock Taylor 32-yard field goal, 8:59. Commodores 3–0. Drive: 13 plays, 61 yards, 6:01.
- APSU – Denver Harper 24-yard pass from Chris Parson (Nick Guagliano kick BLOCKED), 6:57. Governors 6–3. Drive: 7 plays, 75 yards, 2:02.
- VAN – Martel Hight defensive PAT conversion, 6:57. Governors 6–5.

Second quarter

- VAN – Brock Taylor 37-yard field goal, 14:19. Commodores 8–6. Drive: 13 plays, 73 yards, 7:31.
- VAN – Blaze Berlowitz 7-yard run (Brock Taylor kick), 6:21. Commodores 15–6. Drive: 9 plays, 88 yards, 5:13.
- APSU – Hamilton DiBoyan 51-yard field goal, 1:33. Commodores 15–9. Drive: 10 plays, 42 yards, 4:48.

Third quarter

- VAN – Sedrick Alexander 18-yard run (pass failed), 5:24. Commodores 21–9. Drive: 9 plays, 55 yards, 5:23.

Fourth quarter

- VAN – Josiah Broxton 27-yard punt return (Brock Taylor kick), 14:50. Commodores 28–9.

Statistics	APSU	VAN
First downs	11	20
Plays–yards	46–178	63–395
Rushes–yards	25–62	38–186
Passing yards	116	209
Passing: comp–att–int	12–21–0	18–25–0
Turnovers	0	0
Time of possession	24:13	35:47

Team	Category	Player	Statistics
Austin Peay	Passing	Chris Parson	12/21, 116 yards, TD
Austin Peay	Rushing	Courtland Simmons	5 carries, 26 yards
Austin Peay	Receiving	Marvin Sims	6 receptions, 55 yards
Vanderbilt	Passing	Blaze Berlowitz	11/16, 149 yards
Vanderbilt	Rushing	Sedrick Alexander	10 carries, 60 yards, TD
Vanderbilt	Receiving	Junior Sherrill	4 receptions, 70 yards

=== Morehead State ===
Morehead State Eagles (1–1) at No. 15 Austin Peay Governors (1–1) – Game summary

Quarter	1	2	3	4	Total
Eagles	0	0	0	0	0
No. 15 Governors	0	0	0	0	0

at Fortera Stadium • Clarksville, Tennessee

- Date: September 12
- Game time: 4:00 p.m.
- TV: ESPN+

Game information

First quarter
Second quarter
Third quarter
Fourth quarter

Statistics	MORE	APSU
First downs		
Plays–yards		
Rushes–yards		
Passing yards		
Passing: comp–att–int		
Turnovers		
Time of possession		

Team	Category	Player	Statistics
Morehead State	Passing		
Morehead State	Rushing		
Morehead State	Receiving		
Austin Peay	Passing		
Austin Peay	Rushing		
Austin Peay	Receiving		

=== at No. 17 West Florida ===
No. 14т Austin Peay Governors (2–1) at No. 17 West Florida Argonauts (2–0) – Game summary

Quarter	1	2	3	4	Total
No. 14т Governors	14	14	0	10	38
No. 17 Argonauts	0	10	6	0	16

at Pen Air Field • Pensacola, Florida

- Date: September 19
- Game time: 6:00 p.m.
- Game weather: Sunny • Temperature: 90 °F (32 °C)
- Game attendance: 5,712
- Referee: Matt Jones
- TV announcers (ESPN+): Will Kennedy (play-by-play) and Fred Robbins (analyst)

Game information

First quarter

- APSU – Jaden Robinson 61-yard pass from Chris Parson (Hamilton DiBoyan kick), 10:28. Governors 7–0. Drive: 5 plays, 77 yards, 1:26.
- APSU – Denver Harper 41-yard run (Hamilton DiBoyan kick), 7:36. Governors 14–0. Drive: 5 plays, 54 yards, 2:11.

Second quarter

- APSU – Chris Parson 10-yard run (Hamilton DiBoyan kick), 14:52. Governors 21–0. Drive: 4 plays, 50 yards, 1:45.
- UWF – Ty'ray Davis 10-yard run (Reid Grek kick), 12:08. Governors 21–7. Drive: 6 plays, 76 yards, 2:38.
- APSU – Courtland Simmons 5-yard run (Hamilton DiBoyan kick), 5:09. Governors 28–7. Drive: 5 plays, 76 yards, 2:16.
- UWF – Reid Grek 18-yard field goal, 0:00. Governors 28–10. Drive: 4 plays, 18 yards, 1:08.

Third quarter

- UWF – Avery Giddens 1-yard pass from Ty'ray Davis (kick failed), 7:56. Governors 28–16. Drive: 11 plays, 83 yards, 6:58.

Fourth quarter

- APSU – Hamilton DiBoyan 37-yard field goal, 6:42. Governors 31–16. Drive: 9 plays, 53 yards, 5:37.
- APSU – Justin Wimpye 70-yard interception return (Hamilton DiBoyan kick), 4:26. Governors 38–16.

Statistics	APSU	UWF
First downs	19	14
Plays–yards	62–384	64–313
Rushes–yards	46–235	38–164
Passing yards	149	149
Passing: comp–att–int	7–16–0	12–26–2
Turnovers	0	3
Time of possession	30:20	29:40

Team	Category	Player	Statistics
Austin Peay	Passing	Chris Parson	7/16, 149 yards, TD
Austin Peay	Rushing	Courtland Simmons	17 carries, 78 yards, TD
Austin Peay	Receiving	Jaden Robinson	2 receptions, 108 yards, TD
West Florida	Passing	Ty'ray Davis	8/14, 118 yards, TD, INT
West Florida	Rushing	Markel Townsend	9 carries, 93 yards
West Florida	Receiving	Tyshon Mansell	1 reception, 48 yards

=== UT Martin ===
UT Martin Skyhawks (1–3) at No. 13 Austin Peay Governors (3–1) – Game summary

Quarter	1	2	3	4	Total
Skyhawks	0	0	0	0	0
No. 13 Governors	0	0	0	0	0

at Fortera Stadium • Clarksville, Tennessee

- Date: September 26
- Game time: 1:00 p.m.
- TV announcers (ESPN+): Barry Gresham (play-by-play) and Ethan Schmidt (analyst)

Game information

First quarter
Second quarter
Third quarter
Fourth quarter

Statistics	UTM	APSU
First downs		
Plays–yards		
Rushes–yards		
Passing yards		
Passing: comp–att–int		
Turnovers		
Time of possession		

Team	Category	Player	Statistics
UT Martin	Passing		
UT Martin	Rushing		
UT Martin	Receiving		
Austin Peay	Passing		
Austin Peay	Rushing		
Austin Peay	Receiving		

=== New Haven ===
New Haven Chargers (1–4) at No. 11 Austin Peay Governors (4–1) – Game summary

Quarter	1	2	3	4	Total
Chargers	0	0	0	0	0
No. 11 Governors	0	0	0	0	0

at Fortera Stadium • Clarksville, Tennessee

- Date: October 3
- Game time: 4:00 p.m.

Game information

First quarter
Second quarter
Third quarter
Fourth quarter

Statistics	NH	APSU
First downs		
Plays–yards		
Rushes–yards		
Passing yards		
Passing: comp–att–int		
Turnovers		
Time of possession		

Team	Category	Player	Statistics
New Haven	Passing		
New Haven	Rushing		
New Haven	Receiving		
Austin Peay	Passing		
Austin Peay	Rushing		
Austin Peay	Receiving		

=== No. 3 Tarleton State ===
No. 3 Tarleton State Texans (5–0) at No. 9 Austin Peay Governors (5–1) – Game summary

Quarter	1	2	3	4	Total
No. 3 Texans	0	0	0	0	0
No. 9 Governors	0	0	0	0	0

at Fortera Stadium • Clarksville, Tennessee

- Date: October 10
- Game time: 6:00 p.m.

Game information

First quarter
Second quarter
Third quarter
Fourth quarter

Statistics	TAR	APSU
First downs		
Plays–yards		
Rushes–yards		
Passing yards		
Passing: comp–att–int		
Turnovers		
Time of possession		

Team	Category	Player	Statistics
Tarleton State	Passing		
Tarleton State	Rushing		
Tarleton State	Receiving		
Austin Peay	Passing		
Austin Peay	Rushing		
Austin Peay	Receiving		

=== at West Georgia ===
No. 12 Austin Peay Governors (5–2) at West Georgia Wolves (1–5) – Game summary

Quarter	1	2	3	4	Total
No. 12 Governors	0	0	0	0	0
Wolves	0	0	0	0	0

at University Stadium • Carrollton, Georgia

- Date: October 17
- Game time: 1:00 p.m.

Game information

First quarter
Second quarter
Third quarter
Fourth quarter

Statistics	APSU	UWG
First downs		
Plays–yards		
Rushes–yards		
Passing yards		
Passing: comp–att–int		
Turnovers		
Time of possession		

Team	Category	Player	Statistics
Austin Peay	Passing		
Austin Peay	Rushing		
Austin Peay	Receiving		
West Georgia	Passing		
West Georgia	Rushing		
West Georgia	Receiving		

=== at North Alabama ===
Austin Peay Governors (6–2) at North Alabama Lions (4–3) – Game summary

Quarter	1	2	3	4	Total
No. 9 Governors	0	0	0	0	0
Lions	0	0	0	0	0

at Bank Independent Stadium • Florence, Alabama

- Date: October 24
- Game time: 6:00 p.m.

Game information

First quarter
Second quarter
Third quarter
Fourth quarter

Statistics	APSU	UNA
First downs		
Plays–yards		
Rushes–yards		
Passing yards		
Passing: comp–att–int		
Turnovers		
Time of possession		

Team	Category	Player	Statistics
Austin Peay	Passing		
Austin Peay	Rushing		
Austin Peay	Receiving		
North Alabama	Passing		
North Alabama	Rushing		
North Alabama	Receiving		

=== Eastern Kentucky ===
Eastern Kentucky Colonels (3–6) at No. 7 Austin Peay Governors (7–2) – Game summary

Quarter	1	2	3	4	Total
Colonels	0	0	0	0	0
No. 7 Governors	0	0	0	0	0

at Fortera Stadium • Clarksville, Tennessee

- Date: November 7
- Game time: 4:00 p.m.

Game information

First quarter
Second quarter
Third quarter
Fourth quarter

Statistics	EKU	APSU
First downs		
Plays–yards		
Rushes–yards		
Passing yards		
Passing: comp–att–int		
Turnovers		
Time of possession		

Team	Category	Player	Statistics
Eastern Kentucky	Passing		
Eastern Kentucky	Rushing		
Eastern Kentucky	Receiving		
Austin Peay	Passing		
Austin Peay	Rushing		
Austin Peay	Receiving		

=== No. 24 Abilene Christian ===
No. 24 Abilene Christian Wildcats (5–5) at No. 6 Austin Peay Governors (8–2) – Game summary

Quarter	1	2	3	4	Total
No. 24 Wildcats	0	0	0	0	0
No. 6 Governors	0	0	0	0	0

at Fortera Stadium • Clarksville, Tennessee

- Date: November 14
- Game time: 1:00 p.m.

Game information

First quarter
Second quarter
Third quarter
Fourth quarter

Statistics	ACU	APSU
First downs		
Plays–yards		
Rushes–yards		
Passing yards		
Passing: comp–att–int		
Turnovers		
Time of possession		

Team	Category	Player	Statistics
Abilene Christian	Passing		
Abilene Christian	Rushing		
Abilene Christian	Receiving		
Austin Peay	Passing		
Austin Peay	Rushing		
Austin Peay	Receiving		

=== at Central Arkansas ===
No. 14 Austin Peay Governors (8–3) at Central Arkansas Bears (4–7) – Game summary

Quarter	1	2	3	4	Total
No. 14 Governors	0	0	0	0	0
Bears	0	0	0	0	0

at Estes Stadium • Conway, Arkansas

- Date: November 21
- Game time: 4:00 p.m.

Game information

First quarter
Second quarter
Third quarter
Fourth quarter

Statistics	APSU	CARK
First downs		
Plays–yards		
Rushes–yards		
Passing yards		
Passing: comp–att–int		
Turnovers		
Time of possession		

Team	Category	Player	Statistics
Austin Peay	Passing		
Austin Peay	Rushing		
Austin Peay	Receiving		
Central Arkansas	Passing		
Central Arkansas	Rushing		
Central Arkansas	Receiving		

== Rankings ==
Ranking movements Legend: ██ Increase in ranking ██ Decrease in ranking т = Tied with team above or below
	Week														
Poll	Pre	1	2	3	4	5	6	7	8	9	10	11	12	13	Final
STATS	17	15	15	14т	13	11	9	12	9	8	7	6	14		
Coaches	18	14	15	14	11	9	8	11	9	8	7	6	14		
