= 2026 Tarleton State Texans football team =

American college football season

2026 Tarleton State Texans football

UAC champion

FCS Playoffs
- Conference: United Athletic Conference

Ranking
- STATS: No. 1
- FCS Coaches: No. 1
- Record: 12–0 (7–0 UAC)
- Head coach: Todd Whitten (17th season)
- Offensive coordinator: Chris Ross (1st season)
- Offensive scheme: Spread
- Defensive coordinator: Tyrone Nix (5th season)
- Base defense: 4–3
- Home stadium: Memorial Stadium

2026 United Athletic Conference standings
	Conf.			Overall
Team	W		L	W		L
No. 1 Tarleton State $^	7	–	0	12	–	0
No. 19 Abilene Christian	5	–	2	6	–	6
No. 14 Austin Peay	4	–	3	8	–	4
North Alabama	4	–	3	7	–	5
Central Arkansas	3	–	4	5	–	7
Eastern Kentucky	3	–	4	4	–	8
West Florida*	2	–	5	5	–	5
West Georgia*	0	–	7	1	–	11
$ – Conference champion; ^ – FCS playoff participant; * – Ineligible for UAC title and FCS postseason play due to transition from NCAA Division II.; As of November 22, 2026; Rankings from STATS Poll

The 2026 Tarleton State Texans football team represents Tarleton State University as a member of the United Athletic Conference (UAC) during the 2026 NCAA Division I FCS football season. The Texans are led by seventeenth-year head coach Todd Whitten and play their home games at Memorial Stadium in Stephenville, Texas.

Tarleton State secured at least a share of its second straight United Athletic Conference championship after beating West Florida on November 14.

== Schedule ==
Date	Time	Opponent	Rank	Site	TV	Result	Attendance
August 29	8:00 p.m.	Prairie View A&M*	No. 5	Memorial Stadium; Stephenville, TX	ESPN2	W 49–30	24,481
September 5	11:00 a.m.	at Bowling Green*	No. 5	Doyt Perry Stadium; Bowling Green, OH	ESPN+	W 20–13	13,367
September 12	7:00 p.m.	at McNeese*	No. 4	Navarre Stadium; Lake Charles, LA	ESPN+	W 27–24	9,202
September 19	6:00 p.m.	Merrimack*	No. 4	Memorial Stadium; Stephenville, TX	ESPN+	W 45–20	24,612
October 3	6:00 p.m.	Chicago State*	No. 4	Memorial Stadium; Stephenville, TX	ESPN+	W 56–21	16,121
October 10	6:00 p.m.	at No. 9 Austin Peay	No. 3	Fortera Stadium; Clarksville, TN	ESPN+	W 40–32	8,167
October 17	6:00 p.m.	Central Arkansas^{†}	No. 2	Memorial Stadium; Stephenville, TX	ESPN+	W 49–35	23,434
October 24	1:00 p.m.	at West Georgia	No. 1	University Stadium; Carrollton, GA	ESPN+	W 49–6	5,954
October 31	6:00 p.m.	Eastern Kentucky	No. 1	Memorial Stadium; Stephenville, TX	ESPN+	W 28–24	15,876
November 7	6:00 p.m.	No. 23 Abilene Christian	No. 1	Memorial Stadium; Stephenville, TX	ESPN+	W 40–27	23,986
November 14	2:00 p.m.	at West Florida	No. 1	Pen Air Field; Pensacola, FL	ESPN+	W 31–17	6,400
November 21	3:00 p.m.	at North Alabama	No. 1	Bank Independent Stadium; Florence, AL	ESPN+	W 31–24	9,813
*Non-conference game; ^{†}Homecoming; Rankings from STATS Poll released prior to the game; All times are in Central time

== Rankings ==
Ranking movements Legend: ██ Increase in ranking ██ Decrease in ranking ( ) = First-place votes
	Week														
Poll	Pre	1	2	3	4	5	6	7	8	9	10	11	12	13	Final
STATS	5	5	4	4	4	4	3 (2)	2 (5)	1 (49)	1 (47)	1 (39)	1 (48)	1 (46)		
Coaches	5	5	5	5	3	3	2 (1)	2 (3)	1 (24)	1 (25)	1 (23)	1 (26)	1 (26)		

== Game summaries ==
=== Prairie View A&M ===
Prairie View A&M Panthers (0–0) at No. 5 Tarleton State Texans (0–0) – Game summary

Quarter	1	2	3	4	Total
Panthers	7	13	3	7	30
No. 5 Texans	14	14	14	7	49

at Memorial Stadium • Stephenville, Texas

- Date: August 29
- Game time: 8:00 p.m. CDT
- Game weather: Sunny
- Game attendance: 24,481
- Referee: John Kellermeier
- TV announcers (ESPN2): Ted Emrich and Fozzy Whittaker
- Box score, Recap

Game information
First quarter
- TAR – Marquis Willis 7-yard pass from Kaden Anderson (Alejandro De La Poza kick), 10:58. Texans 7–0. Drive: 9 plays, 69 yards, 3:55.
- PV – Chase Bingmon 2-yard run (Ethan Eddins kick), 7:39. Tied 7–7. Drive: 8 plays, 74 yards, 3:14.
- TAR – Tylan Hines 40-yard run (Alejandro De La Poza kick), 6:29. Texans 14–7. Drive: 4 plays, 75 yards, 1:10.

Second quarter

- PV – Team safety, 15:00. Texans 14–9.
- PV – Ethan Eddins 28-yard field goal, 8:47. Texans 14–12. Drive: 14 plays, 44 yards, 5:58.
- TAR – Marquis Willis 30-yard pass from Kaden Anderson (Alejandro De La Poza kick), 7:51. Texans 21–12. Drive: 4 plays, 52 yards, 1:47.
- TAR – Tanner Schmidt 15-yard pass from Kaden Anderson (Alejandro De La Poza kick), 1:19. Texans 28–12. Drive: 11 plays, 55 yards, 3:48.
- PV – Tevin Carter 4-yard run (Tevin Carter pass to Travon Jones), 0:23. Texans 28–20. Drive: 5 plays, 72 yards, 0:56.

Third quarter

- TAR – Tylan Hines 63-yard run (Alejandro De La Poza kick), 12:28. Texans 35–20. Drive: 2 plays, 63 yards, 0:20.
- TAR – Kaden Anderson 2-yard run (Alejandro De La Poza kick), 7:41. Texans 42–20. Drive: 8 plays, 55 yards, 3:10.
- PV – Ethan Eddins 21-yard field goal, 3:45. Texans 42–23. Drive: 9 plays, 73 yards, 3:50.

Fourth quarter

- TAR – Klein Essler 7-yard pass from Brayden Locke (Alejandro De La Poza kick), 11:52. Texans 49–23. Drive: 12 plays, 83 yards, 6:32.
- PV – Jahbari Kuykendall 53-yard pass from Tevin Carter (Ethan Eddins kick), 9:51. Texans 49–30. Drive: 6 plays, 84 yards, 1:56.

Statistics	PV	TAR
First downs	26	26
Plays–yards	78–524	65–506
Rushes–yards	35–188	38–232
Passing yards	336	274
Passing: comp–att–int	28–43–0	20–27–0
Turnovers	0	0
Time of possession	30:33	29:27

Team	Category	Player	Statistics
Prairie View A&M	Passing	Tevin Carter	25/40, 309 yards, TD
Prairie View A&M	Rushing	Tevin Carter	14 carries, 130 yards, TD
Prairie View A&M	Receiving	Damien McDonald	4 receptions, 75 yards
Tarleton State	Passing	Kaden Anderson	15/21, 224 yards, 3 TD
Tarleton State	Rushing	Tylan Hines	25 carries, 184 yards, 2 TD
Tarleton State	Receiving	Marquis Willis	5 receptions, 102 yards, 2 TD

=== at Bowling Green (FBS) ===
No. 5 Tarleton State Texans (1–0) at Bowling Green Falcons (FBS) (0–0) – Game summary

Quarter	1	2	3	4	Total
No. 5 Texans	7	10	0	3	20
Falcons (FBS)	0	7	3	3	13

at Doyt Perry Stadium • Bowling Green, Ohio

- Date: September 5
- Game time: 11:00 a.m. CDT / 12:00 p.m. EDT
- Game weather: Sunny • Temperature: 75 °F (24 °C) • Wind: SE at 4 miles per hour (6.4 km/h)
- Game attendance: 13,367
- Referee: Andrew Speciale
- TV announcers (ESPN+): Kelsie Kasper and Ryan Cavanaugh

Game information

First quarter

- TAR – Tanner Schmidt 24-yard pass from Kaden Anderson (Alejandro De La Poza kick), 9:39. Texans 7–0. Drive: 9 plays, 48 yards, 3:13.

Second quarter

- TAR – Alejandro De La Poza 23-yard field goal, 9:44. Texans 10–0. Drive: 10 plays, 74 yards, 3:39.
- TAR – Marquis Willis 7-yard pass from Kaden Anderson (Alejandro De La Poza kick), 2:31. Texans 17–0. Drive: 6 plays, 99 yards, 3:43.
- BGSU – Austyn Dendy 3-yard run (Travis Kenner kick), 1:03. Texans 17–7. Drive: 6 plays, 69 yards, 1:24.

Third quarter

- BGSU – Travis Kenner 40-yard field goal, 4:45. Texans 17–10. Drive: 13 plays, 62 yards, 8:09.

Fourth quarter

- TAR – Alejandro De La Poza 26-yard field goal, 14:52. Texans 20–10. Drive: 7 plays, 27 yards, 2:17.
- BGSU – Travis Kenner 35-yard field goal, 10:45. Texans 20–13. Drive: 8 plays, 48 yards, 4:02.

Statistics	TAR	BGSU
First downs	19	21
Plays–yards	57–464	67–366
Rushes–yards	33–258	37–104
Passing yards	206	262
Passing: comp–att–int	16–24–0	24–30–0
Turnovers	1	2
Time of possession	25:07	34:53

Team	Category	Player	Statistics
Tarleton State	Passing	Kaden Anderson	16/24, 206 yards, 2 TD
Tarleton State	Rushing	Tylan Hines	26 carries, 250 yards
Tarleton State	Receiving	B.J. Fleming	3 receptions, 57 yards
Bowling Green	Passing	Jay Kastantin	24/30, 262 yards
Bowling Green	Rushing	Austyn Dendy	15 carries, 60 yards, TD
Bowling Green	Receiving	Jeremiah Scoby	10 receptions, 102 yards

=== at McNeese ===
No. 4 Tarleton State Texans (2–0) at McNeese Cowboys (1–1) – Game summary

Quarter	1	2	3	4	Total
No. 4 Texans	7	7	7	6	27
Cowboys	7	0	17	0	24

at Navarre Stadium • Lake Charles, Louisiana

- Date: September 12
- Game time: 6:00 p.m. CDT
- Game weather: Sunny • Temperature: 81 °F (27 °C) • Wind: SW 10 mph
- Game attendance: 9,202
- Referee: Gary Leeper
- TV announcers (ESPN+): Chaston Tavarees (play-by-play), Cody Stroud (analyst) and Lexi Arabie (sideline)

Game information

First quarter

- (7:59) MCN – Omiri Wiggins 13-yard run, Deaglan Camron kick (Drive: 12 plays, 97 yards, 5:52; McNeese 7–0)
- (3:31) TAR – Kaden Anderson 8-yard run, Alejandro De La Poza kick (Drive: 12 plays, 75 yards, 4:28; Tied 7–7)

Second quarter

- (12:45) TAR – Tylan Hines 13-yard run, Alejandro De La Poza kick (Drive: 6 plays, 84 yards, 2:29; Tarleton State 14–7)

Third quarter

- (7:33) MCN – Curtis Deville Jr. 7-yard pass from Devin Lippold, Deaglan Camron kick (Drive: 6 plays, 70 yards, 2:33; Tied 14–14)
- (6:17) TAR – Tylan Hines 46-yard run, Alejandro De La Poza kick (Drive: 4 plays, 55 yards, 1:07; Tarleton State 21–14)
- (4:40) MCN – Curtis Deville Jr. 47-yard pass from Devin Lippold, Deaglan Camron kick (Drive: 4 plays, 85 yards, 1:30; Tied 21–21)
- (0:16) MCN – Deaglan Camron 37-yard field goal (Drive: 6 plays, 59 yards, 2:25; McNeese 24–21)

Fourth quarter

- (12:10) TAR – Alejandro De La Poza 24-yard field goal (Drive: 10 plays, 66 yards, 2:59; Tied 24–24)
- (0:00) TAR – Alejandro De La Poza 24-yard field goal (Drive: 16 plays, 80 yards, 3:48; Tarleton State 27–24)

Statistics	TAR	MCN
First downs	26	24
Plays–yards	70–509	76–495
Rushes–yards	22–146	31–209
Passing yards	363	286
Passing: comp–att–int	28–48–0	27–45–0
Turnovers	0	0
Time of possession	24:50	35:10

Team	Category	Player	Statistics
Tarleton State	Passing	Kaden Anderson	28/48, 363 yards
Tarleton State	Rushing	Tylan Hines	17 carries, 141 yards, 2 TD
Tarleton State	Receiving	Marquis Willis	10 receptions, 166 yards
McNeese	Passing	Devin Lippold	27/45, 286 yards, 2 TD
McNeese	Rushing	Omiri Wiggins	15 carries, 81 yards, TD
McNeese	Receiving	Elisha Edwards	8 receptions, 111 yards

=== Merrimack ===
Merrimack Warriors (1–2) at No. 4 Tarleton State Texans (3–0) – Game summary

Quarter	1	2	3	4	Total
Warriors	0	0	0	0	0
No. 4 Texans	0	0	0	0	0

at Memorial Stadium • Stephenville, Texas

- Date: September 19
- Game time: 6:00 p.m. CDT
- TV: ESPN+

Statistics	MRMK	TAR
First downs		
Plays–yards		
Rushes–yards		
Passing yards		
Passing: comp–att–int		
Turnovers		
Time of possession		

Team	Category	Player	Statistics
Merrimack	Passing		
Merrimack	Rushing		
Merrimack	Receiving		
Tarleton State	Passing		
Tarleton State	Rushing		
Tarleton State	Receiving		

=== Chicago State ===
Chicago State Cougars (1–4) at No. 4 Tarleton State Texans (4–0) – Game summary

Quarter	1	2	3	4	Total
Cougars	0	0	0	0	0
No. 4 Texans	0	0	0	0	0

at Memorial Stadium • Stephenville, Texas

- Date: October 3
- Game time: 6:00 p.m. CDT
- TV: ESPN+

Statistics	CHST	TAR
First downs		
Plays–yards		
Rushes–yards		
Passing yards		
Passing: comp–att–int		
Turnovers		
Time of possession		

Team	Category	Player	Statistics
Chicago State	Passing		
Chicago State	Rushing		
Chicago State	Receiving		
Tarleton State	Passing		
Tarleton State	Rushing		
Tarleton State	Receiving		

=== at No. 9 Austin Peay ===
No. 3 Tarleton State Texans (5–0) at No. 9 Austin Peay Governors (5–1) – Game summary

Quarter	1	2	3	4	Total
No. 3 Texans	0	0	0	0	0
No. 9 Governors	0	0	0	0	0

at Fortera Stadium • Clarksville, Tennessee

- Date: October 10
- Game time: 6:00 p.m. CDT
- TV: ESPN+

Statistics	TAR	APSU
First downs		
Plays–yards		
Rushes–yards		
Passing yards		
Passing: comp–att–int		
Turnovers		
Time of possession		

Team	Category	Player	Statistics
Tarleton State	Passing		
Tarleton State	Rushing		
Tarleton State	Receiving		
Austin Peay	Passing		
Austin Peay	Rushing		
Austin Peay	Receiving		

=== Central Arkansas ===
Central Arkansas Bears (2–4) at No. 2 Tarleton State Texans (6–0) – Game summary

Quarter	1	2	3	4	Total
Bears	0	0	0	0	0
No. 2 Texans	0	0	0	0	0

at Memorial Stadium • Stephenville, Texas

- Date: October 17
- Game time: 6:00 p.m. CDT
- TV: ESPN+

Statistics	CARK	TAR
First downs		
Plays–yards		
Rushes–yards		
Passing yards		
Passing: comp–att–int		
Turnovers		
Time of possession		

Team	Category	Player	Statistics
Central Arkansas	Passing		
Central Arkansas	Rushing		
Central Arkansas	Receiving		
Tarleton State	Passing		
Tarleton State	Rushing		
Tarleton State	Receiving		

=== at West Georgia ===
No. 1 Tarleton State Texans (7–0) at West Georgia Wolves (1–6) – Game summary

Quarter	1	2	3	4	Total
No. 1 Texans	0	0	0	0	0
Wolves	0	0	0	0	0

at University Stadium • Carrollton, Georgia

- Date: October 24
- Game time: 1:00 p.m. CDT / 2:00 p.m. EDT
- TV: ESPN+

Statistics	TAR	UWG
First downs		
Plays–yards		
Rushes–yards		
Passing yards		
Passing: comp–att–int		
Turnovers		
Time of possession		

Team	Category	Player	Statistics
Tarleton State	Passing		
Tarleton State	Rushing		
Tarleton State	Receiving		
West Georgia	Passing		
West Georgia	Rushing		
West Georgia	Receiving		

=== Eastern Kentucky ===
Eastern Kentucky Colonels (3–5) at No. 1 Tarleton State Texans (8–0) – Game summary

Quarter	1	2	3	4	Total
Colonels	0	0	0	0	0
No. 1 Texans	0	0	0	0	0

at Memorial Stadium • Stephenville, Texas

- Date: October 31
- Game time: 6:00 p.m. CDT
- TV: ESPN+

Statistics	EKU	TAR
First downs		
Plays–yards		
Rushes–yards		
Passing yards		
Passing: comp–att–int		
Turnovers		
Time of possession		

Team	Category	Player	Statistics
Eastern Kentucky	Passing		
Eastern Kentucky	Rushing		
Eastern Kentucky	Receiving		
Tarleton State	Passing		
Tarleton State	Rushing		
Tarleton State	Receiving		

=== No. 23 Abilene Christian ===
No. 23 Abilene Christian Wildcats (5–4) at No. 1 Tarleton State Texans (9–0) – Game summary

Quarter	1	2	3	4	Total
No. 23 Wildcats	0	0	0	0	0
No. 1 Texans	0	0	0	0	0

at Memorial Stadium • Stephenville, Texas

- Date: November 7
- Game time: 6:00 p.m. CST
- TV: ESPN+

Statistics	ACU	TAR
First downs		
Plays–yards		
Rushes–yards		
Passing yards		
Passing: comp–att–int		
Turnovers		
Time of possession		

Team	Category	Player	Statistics
Abilene Christian	Passing		
Abilene Christian	Rushing		
Abilene Christian	Receiving		
Tarleton State	Passing		
Tarleton State	Rushing		
Tarleton State	Receiving		

=== at West Florida ===
No. 1 Tarleton State Texans (10–0) at West Florida Argonauts (4–4) – Game summary

Quarter	1	2	3	4	Total
No. 1 Texans	14	14	0	3	31
Argonauts	3	7	0	7	17

at Pen Air Field • Pensacola, Florida

- Date: November 14
- Game time: 2:00 p.m. CDT
- Game weather: Sunny • Temperature: 60 °F (16 °C)
- Game attendance: 6,400
- Referee: Drew Myers
- TV announcers (ESPN+): Will Kennedy (play-by-play), Fred Robbins (analyst), and Justin McGinnis (sideline)

Game information

First quarter

- UWF – Reid Grek 23-yard field goal, 10:24. Argonauts 3–0. Drive: 10 plays, 69 yards, 4:36.
- TSU – Danny Joiner 25-yard pass from Kaden Anderson (Alejandro De La Poza kick), 8:27. Texans 7–3. Drive: 6 plays, 65 yards, 1:57.
- TSU – Marquis Willis 50-yard pass from Kaden Anderson (Alejandro De La Poza kick), 4:47. Texans 14–3. Drive: 5 plays, 70 yards, 1:57.

Second quarter

- UWF – Ty'Ray Davis 1-yard run (Reid Grek kick), 13:00. Texans 14–10. Drive: 9 plays, 61 yards, 2:34.
- TSU – James Paige 3-yard run (Alejandro De La Poza kick), 9:28. Texans 21–10. Drive: 8 plays, 67 yards, 3:25.
- TSU – James Paige 2-yard run (Alejandro De La Poza kick), 0:37. Texans 28–10. Drive: 7 plays, 80 yards, 1:14.

Third quarter

- No scoring plays.

Fourth quarter

- UWF – Keishawn Smith 46-yard pass from Ty'Ray Davis (Reid Grek kick), 8:17. Texans 28–17. Drive: 10 plays, 80 yards, 3:02.
- TSU – Alejandro De La Poza 19-yard field goal, 5:32. Texans 31–17. Drive: 7 plays, 62 yards, 2:39.

Statistics	TAR	UWF
First downs	26	18
Plays–yards	82–559	66–382
Rushes–yards	44–300	24–121
Passing yards	259	261
Passing: comp–att–int	22–38–1	20–42–2
Turnovers	2	2
Time of possession	36:03	23:57

Team	Category	Player	Statistics
Tarleton State	Passing	Kaden Anderson	22/37, 259 yards, 2 TD, INT
Tarleton State	Rushing	Miequle Brock	11 carries, 113 yards
Tarleton State	Receiving	Marquis Willis	7 receptions, 110 yards, TD
West Florida	Passing	Ty'Ray Davis	20/42, 261 yards, TD, 2 INT
West Florida	Rushing	Ty'Ray Davis	13 carries, 76 yards, TD
West Florida	Receiving	Luc Carroll	5 receptions, 85 yards

=== at North Alabama ===
No. 1 Tarleton State Texans (11–0) at North Alabama Lions (7–4) – Game summary

Quarter	1	2	3	4	Total
No. 1 Texans	0	0	0	0	0
Lions	0	0	0	0	0

at Bank Independent Stadium • Florence, Alabama

- Date: November 21
- Game time: 3:00 p.m. CST
- TV: ESPN+

Statistics	TAR	UNA
First downs		
Plays–yards		
Rushes–yards		
Passing yards		
Passing: comp–att–int		
Turnovers		
Time of possession		

Team	Category	Player	Statistics
Tarleton State	Passing		
Tarleton State	Rushing		
Tarleton State	Receiving		
North Alabama	Passing		
North Alabama	Rushing		
North Alabama	Receiving		
