= 2026 West Georgia Wolves football team =

American college football season

2026 West Georgia Wolves football
- Conference: United Athletic Conference
- Record: 1–11 (0–7 UAC)
- Head coach: Steve Englehart (1st season)
- Offensive coordinator: Jayson Martin (1st season)
- Defensive coordinator: Dan Owen (1st season)
- Home stadium: University Stadium

2026 United Athletic Conference standings
	Conf.			Overall
Team	W		L	W		L
No. 1 Tarleton State $^	7	–	0	12	–	0
No. 19 Abilene Christian	5	–	2	6	–	6
No. 14 Austin Peay	4	–	3	8	–	4
North Alabama	4	–	3	7	–	5
Central Arkansas	3	–	4	5	–	7
Eastern Kentucky	3	–	4	4	–	8
West Florida*	2	–	5	5	–	5
West Georgia*	0	–	7	1	–	11
^ – FCS playoff participant; * – Ineligible for UAC title and FCS postseason play due to transition from NCAA Division II.; As of November 22, 2026; Rankings from STATS Poll

The 2026 West Georgia Wolves football team represented the University of West Georgia as a member of the United Athletic Conference (UAC) during the 2026 NCAA Division I FCS football season. The Wolves were led by first-year head coach Steve Englehart and played their home games at University Stadium in Carrollton, Georgia.

== Schedule ==
Date	Time	Opponent	Site	TV	Result	Attendance
August 27	7:00 p.m.	Chattanooga*	University Stadium; Carrollton, GA	ESPN+	L 10–24	5,237
September 3	7:00 p.m.	at Kennesaw State*	Fifth Third Stadium; Kennesaw, GA	ESPN+	L 0–47	11,040
September 12	7:00 p.m.	at Arkansas State*	Centennial Bank Stadium; Jonesboro, AR	ESPN+	L 7–52	16,678
September 19	12:00 p.m.	at East Tennessee State*	William B. Greene Jr. Stadium; Johnson City, TN	ESPN+	L 27–35	5,103
September 26	6:00 p.m.	Fort Valley State*	University Stadium; Carrollton, GA	ESPN+	W 49–7	5,374
October 10	6:00 p.m.	at Eastern Kentucky	Roy Kidd Stadium; Richmond, KY	ESPN+	L 20–30	3,205
October 17	2:00 p.m.	No. 12 Austin Peay	University Stadium; Carrollton, GA	ESPN+	L 10–24	3,892
October 24	2:00 p.m.	No. 1 Tarleton State^{†}	University Stadium; Carrollton, GA	ESPN+	L 6–49	5,954
October 31	4:00 p.m.	at No. 24 Abilene Christian	Wildcat Stadium; Abilene, TX	ESPN+	L 0–59	9,308
November 7	5:00 p.m.	at Central Arkansas	Estes Stadium; Conway, AR	ESPN+	L 14–35	4,374
November 14	2:00 p.m.	North Alabama	University Stadium; Carrollton, GA	ESPN+	L 7–28	2,846
November 21	2:00 p.m.	West Florida	University Stadium; Carrollton, GA	ESPN+	L 16–24	2,156
*Non-conference game; ^{†}Homecoming; Rankings from STATS Poll released prior to the game; All times are in Eastern time

== Game summaries ==
=== Chattanooga ===
Chattanooga Mocs (0–0) at West Georgia Wolves (0–0) – Game summary

Quarter	1	2	3	4	Total
Mocs	0	3	14	7	24
Wolves	0	7	3	0	10

at University Stadium • Carrollton, Georgia

- Date: August 27
- Game time: 7:00 p.m.
- Game weather: Cloudy • Temperature: 82 °F (28 °C)
- Game attendance: 5,237
- Referee: Drew Myers
- TV announcers (ESPN+): Patrick Aldson and Alvin Delve

Game information

First quarter

- No scoring plays.

Second quarter

- UWG – Christian Monfort 1-yard run (Freddy Perez kick), 7:46. Wolves 7–0. Drive: 7 plays, 78 yards, 3:04.
- UTC – Jude Kelley 39-yard field goal, 0:00. Wolves 7–3. Drive: 13 plays, 26 yards, 3:50.

Third quarter

- UTC – Ashton Schumann 72-yard pass from Battle Alberson (Jude Kelley kick), 14:16. Mocs 10–7. Drive: 2 plays, 75 yards, 0:44.
- UWG – Freddy Perez 43-yard field goal, 12:50. Tied 10–10. Drive: 5 plays, 50 yards, 1:26.
- UTC – Boobie Leavell 20-yard pass from Battle Alberson (Jude Kelley kick), 12:47. Mocs 17–10. Drive: 8 plays, 71 yards, 4:25.

Fourth quarter

- UTC – Kevin Lalin 6-yard run (Jude Kelley kick), 9:53. Mocs 24–10. Drive: 9 plays, 52 yards, 4:57.

Statistics	UTC	UWG
First downs	20	12
Plays–yards	69–329	50–219
Rushes–yards	51–149	19–38
Passing yards	180	181
Passing: comp–att–int	9–18–0	20–31–0
Turnovers	0	0
Time of possession	36:43	23:17

Team	Category	Player	Statistics
Chattanooga	Passing	Battle Albertson	9/17, 180 yards, 2 TD
Chattanooga	Rushing	Kevin Lalin	30 carries, 128 yards, TD
Chattanooga	Receiving	Ashton Schumann	4 receptions, 100 yards, TD
West Georgia	Passing	Collin Hurst	19/30, 124 yards
West Georgia	Rushing	Justin Montgomery	8 receptions, 31 yards
West Georgia	Receiving	Josh Schuchts	1 reception, 57 yards

=== at Kennesaw State (FBS) ===
West Georgia Wolves (0–1) at Kennesaw State Owls (FBS) (0–0) – Game summary

Quarter	1	2	3	4	Total
Wolves	0	0	0	0	0
Owls (FBS)	19	21	7	0	47

at Fifth Third Bank Stadium • Kennesaw, Georgia

- Date: September 3
- Game time: 7:00 p.m.
- Game weather: Clear • Temperature: 84 °F (29 °C) • Wind: SW at 5 mph
- Game attendance: 11,040
- Referee: Jeremee Tate
- TV announcers (ESPN+): Nolan Alexander, Caleb O'Neal, Matthew Downing and Lexi Bowden

Game information

First quarter

- KENN – Latrelle Murrell 45-yard run (Daniel Kinney kick failed), 13:16. Owls 6–0. Drive: 5 plays, 53 yards, 1:36.
- KENN – Triston Morgan 60-yard run (pass failed), 2:07. Owls 12–0. Drive: 1 play, 60 yards, 0:31.
- KENN – Rickie Collins 3-yard run (Daniel Kinney kick), 1:16. Owls 19–0. Drive: 2 plays, 14 yards, 0:44.

Second quarter

- KENN – Latrelle Murrell 17-yard run (Daniel Kinney kick), 6:18. Owls 26–0. Drive: 4 plays, 62 yards, 1:21.
- KENN – Rickie Collins 24-yard run (Daniel Kinney kick), 3:22. Owls 33–0. Drive: 6 plays, 61 yards, 1:15.
- KENN – Boogie Woods III 1-yard run (Daniel Kinney kick), 1:26. Owls 40–0. Drive: 6 plays, 31 yards, 1:48.

Third quarter

- KENN – Dylan Gary 9-yard pass from Rickie Collins (Daniel Kinney kick), 9:19. Owls 47–0. Drive: 8 plays, 73 yards, 3:08.

Fourth quarter

- No scoring plays.

Statistics	UWG	KENN
First downs	7	30
Plays–yards	51–160	81–508
Rushes–yards	25–49	47–297
Passing yards	111	211
Passing: Comp–Att–Int	15–26–0	26–34–1
Turnovers	2	2
Time of possession	25:54	34:06

Team	Category	Player	Statistics
West Georgia	Passing	Collin Hurst	9/15, 93 yards
West Georgia	Rushing	Luke Marble	5 carries, 21 yards
West Georgia	Receiving	Malik Leverett	2 receptions, 28 yards
Kennesaw State	Passing	Rickie Collins	18/23, 156 yards, TD
Kennesaw State	Rushing	Latrelle Murrell	9 carries, 88 yards, 2 TD
Kennesaw State	Receiving	Javon Rogers	2 receptions, 55 yards

=== at Arkansas State (FBS) ===
West Georgia Wolves (0–2) at Arkansas State Red Wolves (FBS) (0–1) – Game summary

Quarter	1	2	3	4	Total
Wolves	0	7	0	0	7
Red Wolves (FBS)	0	21	17	14	52

at Centennial Bank Stadium • Jonesboro, Arkansas

- Date: September 12
- Game time: 7:00 p.m.
- Game weather: Sunny • Temperature: 93 °F (34 °C) • Wind: NW at 5 mph
- Game attendance: 16,678
- Referee: Marty Adams
- TV announcers (ESPN+): Graham Doty and Pete Cordelli

Game information

First quarter

- No scoring plays.

Second quarter

- ARST – Chauncy Cobb 28-yard pass from Trey Owens (Clune Van Andel kick), 12:50. Red Wolves 7–0. Drive: 10 plays, 84 yards, 5:18.
- ARST – Jaylen Bonelli 30-yard pass from Trey Owens (Clune Van Andel kick), 5:28. Red Wolves 14–0. Drive: 8 plays, 57 yards, 4:43.
- ARST – Noah Flores 68-yard fumble return (Clune Van Andel kick), 1:19. Red Wolves 21–0.
- UWG – T.J. Lockley 37-yard pass from Colton Fitzgerald (Logan Lopez kick), 0:05. Red Wolves 21–7. Drive: 9 plays, 60 yards, 1:14.

Third quarter

- ARST – Five Hamilton 91-yard interception return (Clune Van Andel kick), 11:13. Red Wolves 28–7.
- ARST – Kenyon Clay 5-yard run (Clune Van Andel kick), 8:26. Red Wolves 35–7. Drive: 6 plays, 31 yards, 2:36.
- ARST – Clune Van Andel 25-yard field goal, 1:43. Red Wolves 38–7. Drive: 10 plays, 31 yards, 5:14.

Fourth quarter

- ARST – Drew Dickey 4-yard run (Clune Van Andel kick), 9:49. Red Wolves 45–7. Drive: 10 plays, 70 yards, 5:49.
- ARST – Solomon Baggett 33-yard run (Clune Van Andel kick), 2:31. Red Wolves 52–7. Drive: 4 plays, 80 yards, 2:34.

Statistics	UWG	ARST
First downs	13	21
Plays–yards	58–246	57–391
Rushes–yards	24–72	40–256
Passing yards	174	135
Passing: comp–att–int	19–34–2	13–17–0
Turnovers	4	1
Time of possession	27:58	32:02

Team	Category	Player	Statistics
West Georgia	Passing	Colton Fitzgerald	14/24, 149 yards, TD, 2 INT
West Georgia	Rushing	Christian Monfort	6 carries, 20 yards
West Georgia	Receiving	T.J. Lockley	6 receptions, 76 yards, TD
Arkansas State	Passing	Trey Owens	13/17, 135 yards, 2 TD
Arkansas State	Rushing	Solomon Baggett	8 carries, 70 yards, TD
Arkansas State	Receiving	Chauncy Cobb	4 receptions, 54 yards, TD

=== at East Tennessee State ===
West Georgia Wolves (0–3) at East Tennessee State Buccaneers (1–2) – Game summary

Quarter	1	2	3	4	Total
Wolves	0	10	14	3	27
Buccaneers	7	14	7	7	35

at William B. Greene Jr. Stadium • Johnson City, Tennessee

- Date: September 19
- Game time: 12:00 p.m.
- Game weather: Sunny • Temperature: 81 °F (27 °C) • Wind: W at 2 miles per hour (3.2 km/h)
- Game attendance: 5,103
- Referee: Todd Boyd
- TV announcers (ESPN+): Keith Brake (play-by-play), Mark Hutsell (analyst), Kennedy Story (sideline)

Game information

First quarter

- ETSU - Jason Albritton 6-yard run (Ewan Johnson kick), 2:04. Buccaneers 7–0. Drive: 18 plays, 80 yards, 7:13.

Second quarter

- UWG - Malik Leverett 1-yard pass from Colton Fitzgerald (Logan Lopez kick), 10:54. Tied 7–7. Drive: 11 plays, 75 yards, 6:10.
- UWG - Logan Lopez 46-yard field goal, 9:36. Wolves 10–7. Drive: 4 plays, -4 yards, 1:15.
- ETSU - TJ Peyton 14-yard run (Ewan Johnson kick), 6:21. Buccaneers 14–10. Drive: 7 plays, 73 yards, 3:08.
- ETSU - Vashawn Nails 8-yard pass from Mason Mims (Ewan Johnson kick), 2:00. Buccaneers 21–10. Drive: 7 plays, 80 yards, 2:36.

Third quarter

- UWG - Josh Suchuchts 6-yard pass from Colton Fitzgerald (Logan Lopez kick), 12:22. Buccaneers 21–17. Drive: 7 plays, 75 yards, 2:38.
- UWG - T.J. Lockley 9-yard pass from Colton Fitzgerald (Logan Lopez kick), 5:15. Wolves 24–21. Drive: 13 plays, 80 yards, 5:43.
- ETSU - Mike Jenkins 25-yard interception return from Colton Fitzgerald (Ewan Johnson kick), 0:31. Buccaneers 28–24. Drive: 2 plays, 1 yard, 0:21.

Fourth quarter

- ETSU - Brandon Winton 88-yard pass from Mason Mims (Ewan Johnson kick), 6:10. Buccaneers 35–24. Drive: 3 plays, 85 yards, 0:53.
- UWG - Logan Lopez 29-yard field goal, 3:37. Buccaneers 35–27. Drive: 9 plays, 64 yards, 2:33.

Statistics	UWG	ETSU
First downs	21	18
Plays–yards	80–411	65–377
Rushes–yards	27–64	41–179
Passing yards	347	198
Passing: comp–att–int	30–53–1	15–24–0
Turnovers	1	0
Time of possession	32:17	27:43

Team	Category	Player	Statistics
West Georgia	Passing	Colton Fitzgarald	29/50, 324 yards, 3 TD, INT
West Georgia	Rushing	Justin Montgomery	16 carries, 55 yards
West Georgia	Receiving	Brody Jones	7 receptions, 109 yards
East Tennessee State	Passing	Mason Mims	15/24, 198 yards, 2 TD
East Tennessee State	Rushing	TJ Peyton	17 carries, 94 yards, TD
East Tennessee State	Receiving	Brandon Winton	2 receptions, 96 yards, TD

=== Fort Valley State (DII) ===
Fort Valley State Wildcats (1–2) at West Georgia Wolves (0–4) – Game summary

Quarter	1	2	3	4	Total
Wildcats (DII)	0	0	0	7	7
Wolves	14	14	14	7	49

at University Stadium • Carrollton, Georgia

- Date: September 26
- Game time: 6:00 p.m.
- Game weather: Sunny
- Game attendance: 5,374
- Referee: Andrew Ison
- TV announcers (ESPN+): Patrick Eidson (play-by-play) and Alvin Delve (analyst)

Game information

First quarter

- (11:02) UWG – Justin Montgomery 2-yard run, Logan Lopez kick (Drive: 9 plays, 89 yards, 3:53; West Georgia 7–0)
- (3:09) UWG – Jaden Henry 35-yard pass from Colton FitzGerald, Logan Lopez kick (Drive: 9 plays, 75 yards, 3:41; West Georgia 14–0)

Second quarter

- (8:59) UWG – Justin Montgomery 24-yard pass from Colton FitzGerald, Logan Lopez kick (Drive: 5 plays, 48 yards, 2:18; West Georgia 21–0)
- (1:02) UWG – Christian Monfort 1-yard run, Logan Lopez kick (Drive: 11 plays, 66 yards, 4:49; West Georgia 28–0)

Third quarter

- (9:46) UWG – Zander Erasmus 6-yard pass from Colton FitzGerald, Logan Lopez kick (Drive: 7 plays, 82 yards, 2:39; West Georgia 35–0)
- (2:30) UWG – DK Daniel 17-yard pass from Colton FitzGerald, Logan Lopez kick (Drive: 8 plays, 85 yards, 2:44; West Georgia 42–0)

Fourth quarter

- (10:26) FVST – Michael Cabellero 17-yard pass from Isaiah Nathaniel, Kyle Keese kick (Drive: 4 plays, 30 yards, 1:36; West Georgia 42–7)
- (4:41) UWG – Chancellor Bryant 40-yard interception, Logan Lopez kick (West Georgia 49–7)

Statistics	FVST	UWG
First downs	11	31
Plays–yards	60–174	83–543
Rushes–yards	29–62	38–135
Passing yards	112	408
Passing: comp–att–int	13–31–1	29–45–2
Turnovers	1	2
Time of possession	25:47	34:13

Team	Category	Player	Statistics
Fort Valley State	Passing	Isaiah Nathaniel	11/27, 101 yards, TD, INT
Fort Valley State	Rushing	Michael Cabellero	14 carries, 50 yards
Fort Valley State	Receiving	Jamyez Thompson	1 reception, 29 yards
West Georgia	Passing	Colton FitzGerald	25/37, 384 yards, 4 TD, INT
West Georgia	Rushing	Christian Monfort	10 carries, 37 yards, TD
West Georgia	Receiving	DK Daniel	6 receptions, 80 yards, TD

=== at Eastern Kentucky ===
West Georgia Wolves (1–4) at Eastern Kentucky Colonels (1–4) – Game summary

Quarter	1	2	3	4	Total
Wolves	0	0	0	0	0
Colonels	0	0	0	0	0

at Roy Kidd Stadium • Richmond, Kentucky

- Date: October 10
- Game time: 6:00 p.m.
- TV: ESPN+

Game information

First quarter
Second quarter
Third quarter
Fourth quarter

Statistics	UWG	EKU
First downs		
Plays–yards		
Rushes–yards		
Passing yards		
Passing: comp–att–int		
Turnovers		
Time of possession		

Team	Category	Player	Statistics
West Georgia	Passing		
West Georgia	Rushing		
West Georgia	Receiving		
Eastern Kentucky	Passing		
Eastern Kentucky	Rushing		
Eastern Kentucky	Receiving		

=== No. 12 Austin Peay ===
No. 12 Austin Peay Governors (5–2) at West Georgia Wolves (1–5) – Game summary

Quarter	1	2	3	4	Total
No. 12 Governors	0	0	0	0	0
Wolves	0	0	0	0	0

at University Stadium • Carrollton, Georgia

- Date: October 17
- Game time: 2:00 p.m.

Game information

First quarter
Second quarter
Third quarter
Fourth quarter

Statistics	APSU	UWG
First downs		
Plays–yards		
Rushes–yards		
Passing yards		
Passing: comp–att–int		
Turnovers		
Time of possession		

Team	Category	Player	Statistics
Austin Peay	Passing		
Austin Peay	Rushing		
Austin Peay	Receiving		
West Georgia	Passing		
West Georgia	Rushing		
West Georgia	Receiving		

=== No. 1 Tarleton State ===
No. 1 Tarleton State Texans (7–0) at West Georgia Wolves (1–6) – Game summary

Quarter	1	2	3	4	Total
No. 1 Texans	0	0	0	0	0
Wolves	0	0	0	0	0

at University Stadium • Carrollton, Georgia

- Date: October 24
- Game time: 2:00 p.m.

Game information

First quarter
Second quarter
Third quarter
Fourth quarter

Statistics	TAR	UWG
First downs		
Plays–yards		
Rushes–yards		
Passing yards		
Passing: comp–att–int		
Turnovers		
Time of possession		

Team	Category	Player	Statistics
Tarleton State	Passing		
Tarleton State	Rushing		
Tarleton State	Receiving		
West Georgia	Passing		
West Georgia	Rushing		
West Georgia	Receiving		

=== at No. 24 Abilene Christian ===
West Georgia Wolves (1–7) at No. 24 Abilene Christian Wildcats (4–4) – Game summary

Quarter	1	2	3	4	Total
Wolves	0	0	0	0	0
No. 24 Wildcats	0	0	0	0	0

at Wildcat Stadium • Abilene, Texas

- Date: October 31
- Game time: 4:00 p.m.

Game information

First quarter
Second quarter
Third quarter
Fourth quarter

Statistics	UWG	ACU
First downs		
Plays–yards		
Rushes–yards		
Passing yards		
Passing: comp–att–int		
Turnovers		
Time of possession		

Team	Category	Player	Statistics
West Georgia	Passing		
West Georgia	Rushing		
West Georgia	Receiving		
Abilene Christian	Passing		
Abilene Christian	Rushing		
Abilene Christian	Receiving		

=== at Central Arkansas ===
West Georgia Wolves (1–8) at Central Arkansas Bears (2–7) – Game summary

Quarter	1	2	3	4	Total
Wolves	0	0	0	0	0
Bears	0	0	0	0	0

at Estes Stadium • Conway, Arkansas

- Date: November 7
- Game time: 5:00 p.m.

Game information

First quarter
Second quarter
Third quarter
Fourth quarter

Statistics	UWG	CARK
First downs		
Plays–yards		
Rushes–yards		
Passing yards		
Passing: comp–att–int		
Turnovers		
Time of possession		

Team	Category	Player	Statistics
West Georgia	Passing		
West Georgia	Rushing		
West Georgia	Receiving		
Central Arkansas	Passing		
Central Arkansas	Rushing		
Central Arkansas	Receiving		

=== North Alabama ===
North Alabama Lions (6–4) at West Georgia Wolves (1–9) – Game summary

Quarter	1	2	3	4	Total
Lions	0	0	0	0	0
Wolves	0	0	0	0	0

at University Stadium • Carrollton, Georgia

- Date: November 14
- Game time: 2:00 p.m.

Game information

First quarter
Second quarter
Third quarter
Fourth quarter

Statistics	UNA	UWG
First downs		
Plays–yards		
Rushes–yards		
Passing yards		
Passing: comp–att–int		
Turnovers		
Time of possession		

Team	Category	Player	Statistics
North Alabama	Passing		
North Alabama	Rushing		
North Alabama	Receiving		
West Georgia	Passing		
West Georgia	Rushing		
West Georgia	Receiving		

=== West Florida ===
West Florida Argonauts (4–5) at West Georgia Wolves (1–10) – Game summary

Quarter	1	2	3	4	Total
Argonauts	7	10	0	7	24
Wolves	0	0	16	0	16

at University Stadium • Carrollton, Georgia

- Date: November 21
- Game time: 2:00 p.m.
- Game weather: Cloudy • Temperature: 61 °F (16 °C)
- Game attendance: 2,156
- Referee: John Kellermeier
- TV announcers (ESPN+): Patrick Eidson (play-by-play) and Alvin Delve (analyst)

Game information

First quarter

- UWF – Tyshon Mansell 16-yard pass from Ty'Ray Davis (Reid Grek kick), 6:32. Argonauts 7–0. Drive: 16 plays, 89 yards, 8:24.

Second quarter

- UWF – Jake Robinette 18-yard pass from Ty'Ray Davis (Reid Grek kick), 8:23. Argonauts 14–0. Drive: 11 plays, 91 yards, 5:49.
- UWF – Reid Grek 36-yard field goal, 2:26. Argonauts 17–0. Drive: 8 plays, 40 yards, 4:30.

Third quarter

- UWG – Brody Jones 49-yard pass from Colton FitzGerald (Logan Lopez kick), 12:22. Argonauts 17–7. Drive: 5 plays, 79 yards, 2:32.
- UWG – Aidan Sefa 3-yard pass from Colton FitzGerald (kick failed), 10:37. Argonauts 17–13. Drive: 5 plays, 48 yards, 1:45.
- UWG – Logan Lopez 43-yard field goal, 5:50. Argonauts 17–16. Drive: 9 plays, 43 yards, 4:00.

Fourth quarter

- UWF – Ty'Ray Davis 3-yard run (Reid Grek kick), 3:06. Argonauts 24–16. Drive: 12 plays, 80 yards, 6:14.

Statistics	UWF	UWG
First downs	26	16
Plays–yards	73–403	55–333
Rushes–yards	36–112	25–65
Passing yards	291	268
Passing: comp–att–int	23–37–1	21–30–1
Turnovers	1	1
Time of possession	34:31	25:29

Team	Category	Player	Statistics
West Florida	Passing	Ty'Ray Davis	23/36, 291 yards, 2 TD, INT
West Florida	Rushing	Ty'Ray Davis	20 carries, 60 yards, TD
West Florida	Receiving	Tyshon Mansell	7 receptions, 97 yards, TD
West Georgia	Passing	Colton FitzGerald	21/29, 268 yards, 2 TD, INT
West Georgia	Rushing	Christian Monfort	14 carries, 61 yards
West Georgia	Receiving	T.J. Lockley	6 receptions, 104 yards

== Rankings ==
Ranking movements Legend: ██ Increase in ranking ██ Decrease in ranking — = Not ranked RV = Received votes
	Week														
Poll	Pre	1	2	3	4	5	6	7	8	9	10	11	12	13	Final
STATS	RV	—	—												
Coaches	—	—	—												
