= 2026 Abilene Christian Wildcats football team =

American college football season

2026 Abilene Christian Wildcats football
- Conference: United Athletic Conference

Ranking
- STATS: No. 19
- FCS Coaches: No. 19
- Record: 6–6 (5–2 UAC)
- Head coach: Keith Patterson (5th season)
- Co-offensive coordinators: Graham Harrell (2nd season); Joel Filani (2nd season)
- Offensive scheme: Air raid
- Co-defensive coordinator: Nick Holt (2nd season)
- Base defense: Multiple 3–3–5
- Home stadium: Wildcat Stadium

2026 United Athletic Conference standings
	Conf.			Overall
Team	W		L	W		L
No. 1 Tarleton State $^	7	–	0	12	–	0
No. 19 Abilene Christian	5	–	2	6	–	6
No. 14 Austin Peay	4	–	3	8	–	4
North Alabama	4	–	3	7	–	5
Central Arkansas	3	–	4	5	–	7
Eastern Kentucky	3	–	4	4	–	8
West Florida*	2	–	5	5	–	5
West Georgia*	0	–	7	1	–	11
^ – FCS playoff participant; * – Ineligible for UAC title and FCS postseason play due to transition from NCAA Division II.; As of November 22, 2026; Rankings from STATS Poll

The 2026 Abilene Christian Wildcats football team represents Abilene Christian University as a member of the United Athletic Conference (UAC) during the 2026 NCAA Division I FCS football season. The Wildcats are led by fifth-year head coach Keith Patterson and play their home games at Anthony Field at Wildcat Stadium in Abilene, Texas.

== Schedule ==
Date	Time	Opponent	Rank	Site	TV	Result	Attendance
August 29	6:00 p.m.	at No. 20 Lamar*	No. 15	Provost Umphrey Stadium; Beaumont, TX	ESPN+	L 14–21	7,233
September 5	6:00 p.m.	at No. 12 (FBS) Texas Tech*	No. 20	Galaxy Stadium; Lubbock, TX	FS1	L 10–33	60,229
September 12	7:00 p.m.	No. 13 Stephen F. Austin*	No. 23	Wildcat Stadium; Abilene, TX	ESPN+	L 7–26	7,739
September 19	3:00 p.m.	at Idaho*		Kibbie Dome; Moscow, ID	ESPN+	W 41–39	6,246
September 26	7:00 p.m.	No. 25 Mercer*		Wildcat Stadium; Abilene, TX	ESPN+	L 17–34	10,744
October 3	7:00 p.m.	No. 17 West Florida		Wildcat Stadium; Abilene, TX	ESPN+	W 35–7	7,018
October 10	7:00 p.m.	Central Arkansas		Wildcat Stadium; Abilene, TX	ESPN+	W 20–14	7,466
October 17	6:00 p.m.	at North Alabama		Bank Independent Stadium; Florence, AL	ESPN+	W 31–28	9,186
October 31	3:00 p.m.	West Georgia^{†}	No. 24	Wildcat Stadium; Abilene, TX	ESPN+	W 59–0	9,308
November 7	6:00 p.m.	at No. 1 Tarleton State	No. 23	Memorial Stadium; Stephenville, TX	ESPN+	L 27–40	23,986
November 14	4:00 p.m.	at No. 6 Austin Peay	No. 24	Fortera Stadium; Clarksville, TN	ESPN+	W 34–31	8,248
November 21	1:00 p.m.	Eastern Kentucky	No. 19	Wildcat Stadium; Abilene, TX	ESPN+	L 25–44	7,666
*Non-conference game; ^{†}Homecoming; Rankings from STATS Poll released prior to the game; All times are in Central time

== Game summaries ==
=== at No. 20 Lamar ===
No. 15 Abilene Christian Wildcats (0–0) at No. 20 Lamar Cardinals (0–0) – Game summary

Quarter	1	2	3	4	Total
No. 15 Wildcats	0	7	0	7	14
No. 20 Cardinals	7	7	0	7	21

at Provost Umphrey Stadium • Beaumont, Texas

- Date: August 29
- Game time: 7:00 p.m. CDT
- Game weather: Sunny • Temperature: 90 °F (32 °C) • Wind: S at 7 miles per hour (11 km/h)
- Game attendance: 7,233
- Referee: Austin Mezzacasa
- TV announcers (ESPN+): Dan Gresham, Lemont Williams and Nicole Beckelman

Game information

First quarter

- LAM – Davin Driskell 5-yard pass from Aiden McCown (Andres Sandoval kick), 7:36. Cardinals 7–0. Drive: 10 plays, 72 yards, 5:53.

Second quarter

- ACU – Romelo Boykin 8-yard pass from John David Black (Brandon Perez kick), 1:54. Tied 7–7. Drive: 13 plays, 77 yards, 6:46.
- LAM – Blake Thomas 33-yard pass from Aiden McCown (Andres Sandoval kick), 0:13. Cardinals 14–7. Drive: 6 plays, 75 yards, 1:41.

Third quarter

- No scoring plays.

Fourth quarter

- LAM – Davin Driskell 5-yard pass from Aiden McCown (Andres Sandoval kick), 14:53. Cardinals 21–7. Drive: 14 plays, 65 yards, 7:40.
- ACU – Cristian Driver 4-yard pass from John David Black (Brandon Perez kick), 3:58. Cardinals 21–14. Drive: 7 plays, 79 yards, 3:12.

Statistics	ACU	LAM
First downs	17	17
Plays–yards	62–358	66–278
Rushes–yards	29–151	34–95
Passing yards	207	183
Passing: comp–att–int	19–33–2	17–32–0
Turnovers	2	0
Time of possession	28:21	31:39

Team	Category	Player	Statistics
Abilene Christian	Passing	John David Black	15/25, 142 yards, 2 TD
Abilene Christian	Rushing	Alex Broome	14 carries, 75 yards
Abilene Christian	Receiving	Cristian Driver	5 receptions, 56 yards, TD
Lamar	Passing	Aiden McCown	17/32, 183 yards, 3 TD
Lamar	Rushing	Parker Jenkins	14 carries, 56 yards
Lamar	Receiving	Blake Thomas	3 receptions, 44 yards, TD

=== at No. 12 (FBS) Texas Tech ===
No. 20 Abilene Christian Wildcats (0–1) at No. 12 (FBS) Texas Tech Red Raiders (0–0) – Game summary

Quarter	1	2	3	4	Total
No. 20 Wildcats	0	3	0	7	10
No. 12 (FBS) Red Raiders	14	3	9	7	33

at Galaxy Stadium, Lubbock, Texas

- Date: September 5
- Game time: 6:00 p.m. CDT
- Game weather: Sunny • Temperature: 97 °F (36 °C)
- Game attendance: 60,229
- Referee: Kevin Randall
- TV announcers (FS1): Dan Hellie and Robert Smith
- References: Box score, Recap

Game information

First quarter

- TTU – Quinten Joyner 14-yard run (Stone Harrington kick), 12:14. Red Raiders 7–0. Drive: 7 plays, 75 yards, 2:46.
- TTU – J'Koby Williams 5-yard run (Stone Harrington kick), 2:22. Red Raiders 14–0. Drive: 15 plays, 87 yards, 7:17.

Second quarter

- TTU – Stone Harrington 23-yard field goal, 1:38. Red Raiders 17–0. Drive: 7 plays, 45 yards, 1:45.
- ACU – Brandon Perez 41-yard field goal, 0:07. Red Raiders 17–3. Drive: 11 plays, 51 yards, 1:31.

Third quarter

- TTU – Stone Harrington 28-yard field goal, 13:03. Red Raiders 20–3. Drive: 4 plays, 3 yards, 1:50.
- TTU – Stone Harrington 33-yard field goal, 7:36. Red Raiders 23–3. Drive: 10 plays, 52 yards, 3:19.
- TTU – Stone Harrington 45-yard field goal, 1:52. Red Raiders 26–3. Drive: 8 plays, 40 yards, 3:22.

Fourth quarter

- TTU – Malcolm Simmons 64-yard pass from Will Hammond (Stone Harrington kick), 2:45. Red Raiders 33–3. Drive: 9 plays, 91 yards, 3:49.
- ACU – Alex Broome 98-yard kickoff return (Brandon Perez kick), 2:29. Red Raiders 33–10.

Statistics	ACU	TTU
First downs	15	26
Plays–yards	61–194	73–471
Rushes–yards	29–75	39–173
Passing yards	119	298
Passing: comp–att–int	18–32–1	26–34–1
Turnovers	1	1
Time of possession	27:48	32:12

Team	Category	Player	Statistics
Abilene Christian	Passing	John David Black	18/32, 119 yards, INT
Abilene Christian	Rushing	Alex Broome	10 carries, 52 yards
Abilene Christian	Receiving	Cristian Driver	8 receptions, 93 yards
Texas Tech	Passing	Will Hammond	26/33, 298 yards, TD, INT
Texas Tech	Rushing	J'Koby Williams	13 carries, 71 yards, TD
Texas Tech	Receiving	Kenny Johnson	4 receptions, 76 yards

=== No. 13 Stephen F. Austin ===
No. 13 Stephen F. Austin Lumberjacks (2–0) at No. 23 Abilene Christian Wildcats (0–2) – Game summary

Quarter	1	2	3	4	Total
No. 13 Lumberjacks	0	0	0	0	0
No. 23 Wildcats	0	0	0	0	0

at Wildcat Stadium • Abilene, Texas

- Date: September 12
- Game time: 7:00 p.m.
- TV: ESPN+

Game information

First quarter
Second quarter
Third quarter
Fourth quarter

Statistics	SFA	ACU
First downs		
Plays–yards		
Rushes–yards		
Passing yards		
Passing: comp–att–int		
Turnovers		
Time of possession		

Team	Category	Player	Statistics
Stephen F. Austin	Passing		
Stephen F. Austin	Rushing		
Stephen F. Austin	Receiving		
Abilene Christian	Passing		
Abilene Christian	Rushing		
Abilene Christian	Receiving		

=== at Idaho ===
Abilene Christian Wildcats (0–3) at Idaho Vandals (0–3) – Game summary

Quarter	1	2	3	4	Total
Wildcats	7	14	0	20	41
Vandals	7	10	7	15	39

at Kibbie Dome • Moscow, Idaho

- Date: September 19
- Game time: 3:00 p.m.
- Game weather: Indoor
- Game attendance: 6,246
- Referee: Jeff Rink
- TV announcers (ESPN+): Austin Getz (play-by-play) and Brian Strandley (analyst)

Game information

First quarter

- IDHO – Joshua Wood 1-yard run (Owen Forsman kick), 11:16. Idaho 7–0. Drive: 9 plays, 75 yards, 3:44.
- ACU – Tucker Parks 2-yard run (Brandon Perez kick), 5:16. Abilene Christian 7–7. Drive: 12 plays, 75 yards, 6:00.

Second quarter

- IDHO – Owen Forsman 38-yard field goal, 14:50. Idaho 10–7. Drive: 12 plays, 54 yards, 5:26.
- ACU – Deonte Dean 24-yard run (Brandon Perez kick), 9:11. Abilene Christian 14–10. Drive: 1 play, 24 yards, 0:07.
- IDHO – Tony Harste 47-yard pass from Joshua Wood (Owen Forsman kick), 3:41. Idaho 17–14. Drive: 5 plays, 87 yards, 1:43.
- ACU – Raydrian Baltrip 2-yard pass from Tucker Parks (Brandon Perez kick), 0:02. Abilene Christian 21–17. Drive: 11 plays, 75 yards, 3:39.

Third quarter

- IDHO – Joshua Wood 2-yard run (Owen Forsman kick), 7:20. Idaho 24–21. Drive: 11 plays, 75 yards, 5:26.

Fourth quarter

- ACU – Brandon Perez 31-yard field goal, 14:06. Tied 24–24. Drive: 15 plays, 61 yards, 8:14.
- ACU – Brandon Perez 51-yard field goal, 10:32. Abilene Christian 27–24. Drive: 4 plays, 7 yards, 2:11.
- ACU – Obi Udom 7-yard fumble recovery (Brandon Perez kick), 10:19. Abilene Christian 34–24.
- ACU – Deonte Dean 37-yard pass from Tucker Parks (Brandon Perez kick), 8:49. Abilene Christian 41–24. Drive: 1 play, 37 yards, 0:09.
- IDHO – Joshua Wood 9-yard run (Noah West-Baranco pass), 6:33. Abilene Christian 41–32. Drive: 7 plays, 75 yards, 2:16.
- IDHO – Joshua Wood 3-yard run (Owen Forsman kick), 1:46. Abilene Christian 41–39. Drive: 7 plays, 77 yards, 2:09.

Statistics	ACU	IDHO
First downs	20	28
Plays–yards	65–392	67–444
Rushes–yards	44–244	32–112
Passing yards	148	332
Passing: comp–att–int	14–21–0	23–35–0
Turnovers	0	2
Time of possession	31:41	28:19

Team	Category	Player	Statistics
Abilene Christian	Passing	Tucker Parks	14/21, 148 yards, 2 TD
Abilene Christian	Rushing	Rovaughn Banks Jr.	22 carries, 99 yards
Abilene Christian	Receiving	Deonte Dean	1 reception, 37 yards, TD
Idaho	Passing	Joshua Wood	22/34, 326 yards, TD
Idaho	Rushing	Joshua Wood	13 carries, 37 yards, 4 TD
Idaho	Receiving	Tony Harste	6 receptions, 151 yards, TD

=== No. 25 Mercer ===
No. 25 Mercer Bears (2–2) at Abilene Christian Wildcats (1–3) – Game summary

Quarter	1	2	3	4	Total
No. 25 Bears	0	0	0	0	0
Wildcats	0	0	0	0	0

at Wildcat Stadium • Abilene, Texas

- Date: September 26
- Game time: 7:00 p.m.
- TV: ESPN+

Game information

First quarter
Second quarter
Third quarter
Fourth quarter

Statistics	MER	ACU
First downs		
Plays–yards		
Rushes–yards		
Passing yards		
Passing: comp–att–int		
Turnovers		
Time of possession		

Team	Category	Player	Statistics
Mercer	Passing		
Mercer	Rushing		
Mercer	Receiving		
Abilene Christian	Passing		
Abilene Christian	Rushing		
Abilene Christian	Receiving		

=== No. 17 West Florida ===
No. 17 West Florida Argonauts (3–1) at Abilene Christian Wildcats (1–4) – Game summary

Quarter	1	2	3	4	Total
No. 17 Argonauts	0	0	0	7	7
Wildcats	7	21	0	7	35

at Wildcat Stadium • Abilene, Texas

- Date: October 3
- Game time: 7:00 p.m.
- Game weather: Cloudy • Temperature: 74 °F (23 °C)
- Game attendance: 7,018
- Referee: Zach Erdmann
- TV announcers (ESPN+): Andy Penney (play-by-play) and De'Andre Brown (analyst)

Game information

First quarter

- ACU – Jonathan French-Love 31-yard pass from Tucker Parks (Brandon Perez kick), 0:28. Wildcats 7–0. Drive: 5 plays, 66 yards, 2:25.

Second quarter

- ACU – Rovaughn Banks Jr. 30-yard run (Brandon Perez kick), 10:56. Wildcats 14–0. Drive: 6 plays, 73 yards, 3:14.
- ACU – Deonte Dean 14-yard run (Brandon Perez kick), 6:39. Wildcats 21–0. Drive: 6 plays, 51 yards, 3:14.
- ACU – Jayden York 8-yard pass from Tucker Parks (Brandon Perez kick), 0:37. Wildcats 28–0. Drive: 4 plays, 73 yards, 1:36.

Third quarter

- No scoring plays.

Fourth quarter

- UWF – Jakari Mozelle 22-yard pass from Ty'ray Davis (Reid Grek kick), 5:17. Wildcats 28–7. Drive: 2 plays, 80 yards, 0:55.
- ACU – Bryan Henry 9-yard pass from Tucker Parks (Brandon Perez kick), 1:33. Wildcats 35–7. Drive: 8 plays, 45 yards, 3:44.

Statistics	UWF	ACU
First downs	15	20
Plays–yards	65–328	55–349
Rushes–yards	34–120	38–194
Passing yards	208	155
Passing: comp–att–int	16–31–0	16–17–0
Turnovers	1	1
Time of possession	31:07	28:53

Team	Category	Player	Statistics
West Florida	Passing	Ty'ray Davis	16/31, 208 yards, TD
West Florida	Rushing	Markel Townsend	12 carries, 98 yards
West Florida	Receiving	Tyshon Mansell	2 receptions, 67 yards
Abilene Christian	Passing	Tucker Parks	16/17, 155 yards, 3 TD
Abilene Christian	Rushing	Tucker Parks	15 carries, 97 yards
Abilene Christian	Receiving	Jayden York	4 receptions, 56 yards, TD

=== Central Arkansas ===
Central Arkansas Bears (2–3) at Abilene Christian Wildcats (2–4) – Game summary

Quarter	1	2	3	4	Total
Bears	0	0	0	0	0
Wildcats	0	0	0	0	0

at Wildcat Stadium • Abilene, Texas

- Date: October 10
- Game time: 7:00 p.m.

Game information

First quarter
Second quarter
Third quarter
Fourth quarter

Statistics	CARK	ACU
First downs		
Plays–yards		
Rushes–yards		
Passing yards		
Passing: comp–att–int		
Turnovers		
Time of possession		

Team	Category	Player	Statistics
Central Arkansas	Passing		
Central Arkansas	Rushing		
Central Arkansas	Receiving		
Abilene Christian	Passing		
Abilene Christian	Rushing		
Abilene Christian	Receiving		

=== at North Alabama ===
Abilene Christian Wildcats (3–4) at North Alabama Lions (4–2) – Game summary

Quarter	1	2	3	4	Total
Wildcats	0	0	0	0	0
Lions	0	0	0	0	0

at Bank Independent Stadium • Florence, Alabama

- Date: October 17
- Game time: 6:00 p.m.

Game information

First quarter
Second quarter
Third quarter
Fourth quarter

Statistics	ACU	UNA
First downs		
Plays–yards		
Rushes–yards		
Passing yards		
Passing: comp–att–int		
Turnovers		
Time of possession		

Team	Category	Player	Statistics
Abilene Christian	Passing		
Abilene Christian	Rushing		
Abilene Christian	Receiving		
North Alabama	Passing		
North Alabama	Rushing		
North Alabama	Receiving		

=== West Georgia ===
West Georgia Wolves (1–7) at No. 24 Abilene Christian Wildcats (4–4) – Game summary

Quarter	1	2	3	4	Total
Wolves	0	0	0	0	0
No. 24 Wildcats	0	0	0	0	0

at Wildcat Stadium • Abilene, Texas

- Date: October 31
- Game time: 3:00 p.m.

Game information

First quarter
Second quarter
Third quarter
Fourth quarter

Statistics	UWG	ACU
First downs		
Plays–yards		
Rushes–yards		
Passing yards		
Passing: comp–att–int		
Turnovers		
Time of possession		

Team	Category	Player	Statistics
West Georgia	Passing		
West Georgia	Rushing		
West Georgia	Receiving		
Abilene Christian	Passing		
Abilene Christian	Rushing		
Abilene Christian	Receiving		

=== at No. 1 Tarleton State ===
No. 23 Abilene Christian Wildcats (5–4) at No. 1 Tarleton State Texans (9–0) – Game summary

Quarter	1	2	3	4	Total
No. 23 Wildcats	0	0	0	0	0
No. 1 Texans	0	0	0	0	0

at Memorial Stadium • Stephenville, Texas

- Date: November 7

Game information

First quarter
Second quarter
Third quarter
Fourth quarter

Statistics	ACU	TAR
First downs		
Plays–yards		
Rushes–yards		
Passing yards		
Passing: comp–att–int		
Turnovers		
Time of possession		

Team	Category	Player	Statistics
Abilene Christian	Passing		
Abilene Christian	Rushing		
Abilene Christian	Receiving		
Tarleton State	Passing		
Tarleton State	Rushing		
Tarleton State	Receiving		

=== at No. 6 Austin Peay ===
No. 24 Abilene Christian Wildcats (5–5) at No. 6 Austin Peay Governors (8–2) – Game summary

Quarter	1	2	3	4	Total
No. 24 Wildcats	0	0	0	0	0
No. 6 Governors	0	0	0	0	0

at Fortera Stadium • Clarksville, Tennessee

- Date: November 14
- Game time: 1:00 p.m.

Game information

First quarter
Second quarter
Third quarter
Fourth quarter

Statistics	ACU	APSU
First downs		
Plays–yards		
Rushes–yards		
Passing yards		
Passing: comp–att–int		
Turnovers		
Time of possession		

Team	Category	Player	Statistics
Abilene Christian	Passing		
Abilene Christian	Rushing		
Abilene Christian	Receiving		
Austin Peay	Passing		
Austin Peay	Rushing		
Austin Peay	Receiving		

=== Eastern Kentucky ===
Eastern Kentucky Colonels (3–8) at No. 19 Abilene Christian Wildcats (6–5) – Game summary

Quarter	1	2	3	4	Total
Colonels	0	0	0	0	0
No. 19 Wildcats	0	0	0	0	0

at Wildcat Stadium • Abilene, Texas

- Date: November 21
- Game time: 1:00 p.m.

Game information

First quarter
Second quarter
Third quarter
Fourth quarter

Statistics	EKU	ACU
First downs		
Plays–yards		
Rushes–yards		
Passing yards		
Passing: comp–att–int		
Turnovers		
Time of possession		

Team	Category	Player	Statistics
Eastern Kentucky	Passing		
Eastern Kentucky	Rushing		
Eastern Kentucky	Receiving		
Abilene Christian	Passing		
Abilene Christian	Rushing		
Abilene Christian	Receiving		

== Rankings ==
Ranking movements Legend: ██ Increase in ranking ██ Decrease in ranking — = Not ranked RV = Received votes т = Tied with team above or below
	Week														
Poll	Pre	1	2	3	4	5	6	7	8	9	10	11	12	13	Final
STATS	15	20	23	RV	—	—	RV	RV	RV	24	23	24	19		
Coaches	14	21	25	RV	RV	—	RV	RV	RV	24	22т	24	19		
