= Kaleb Nobles =

American football coach

Current position
- Title: Head coach
- Team: West Florida
- Conference: UAC
- Record: 29–11

Biographical details
- Born: 1993 or 1994 (age 31–32); Jacksonville, Florida, U.S.

Playing career
- 2012–2015: Valdosta State
- 2016: West Florida
- Position: Quarterback

Coaching career (HC unless noted)
- 2017–2018: West Florida (QB)
- 2019: West Florida (co-OC/QB)
- 2021–2022: Clemson (OPD)
- 2023–present: West Florida

Head coaching record
- Overall: 29–11
- Tournaments: 1–2 (NCAA D-II playoffs)

Accomplishments and honors

Championships
- 1 GSC (2025)

Awards
- GSC Co-Coach of the Year (2025)

Kaleb Nobles is an American college football coach. He is the head football coach for the University of West Florida, a position he has held since 2023.

== Playing career ==
Nobles grew up Fitzgerald, Georgia and attended Fitzgerald High School College and Career Academy. As a senior, he completed 107-of-162 pass attempts for 1,481 yards and 15 touchdowns with four interceptions.

Nobles initially played college football at Valdosta State. He played in ten games with two starts as a freshman and passed for 967 yards and 12 touchdowns. As a sophomore Nobles completed 103-of-164 pass attempts for 1,042 yards and seven touchdowns. He competed for the starting quarterback job entering his junior season, but suffered a groin injury in training camp. Nobles ultimately redshirted the season and transferred to West Florida, which had just established its football program. He was named the starting quarterback for the Argonauts inaugural season. Nobles passed for 3,050 yards with 28 touchdowns and 18 interceptions in 11 games played in his final season.

== Coaching career ==
Nobles began his coaching career as the quarterbacks coach at West Florida after graduating. He was promoted to co-offensive coordinator entering the 2019 season. West Florida won the 2019 Division II National Championship. Nobles was hired in an off-field role as the director of offensive player development at Clemson in 2021.

Nobles was hired as the head coach at West Florida on December 12, 2022. The Argonauts went 8–4 in his first season as head coach and made the NCAA Division II playoffs, where they lost to Delta State in the first round.

== Head coaching record ==
Year	Team	Overall	Conference	Standing	Bowl/playoffs	AFCA^{#}	D2^{°}
West Florida Argonauts (Gulf South Conference) (2023–2025)
2023	West Florida	8–4	6–2	3rd	L NCAA Division II First Round	23	22
2024	West Florida	7–3	5–2	3rd			
2025	West Florida	10–2	2–1	T–1st	L NCAA Division II Second Round	9	10
West Florida Argonauts (United Athletic Conference) (2026–present)
2026	West Florida	4–2	1–2				
West Florida:		29–11	14–7				
Total:		29–11					
National championship Conference title Conference division title or championship game berth
