= Steve Saulnier =

American football coach

Current position
- Title: Assistant head coach, offensive line coach
- Team: West Florida
- Conference: GSC

Biographical details
- Born: Jersey City, New Jersey, U.S.
- Education: NC State

Playing career
- 1980–1984: NC State
- Position: Offensive Lineman

Coaching career (HC unless noted)
- 1985–1987: Broughton HS (NC) (OL/DL)
- 1988–1990: Kansas (GA)
- 1990: Brown (GA)
- 1992–1993: New Mexico (OL/DB)
- 1993–1998: Malone (OL)
- 1999–2001: Malone
- 2002: Geneva (DC)
- 2003–2005: West Branch HS (OH)
- 2006–2008: UNC Pembroke (OL)
- 2009–2013: UNC Pembroke (AHC/OL)
- 2014–present: West Florida (AHC/OL)

Head coaching record
- Overall: 10–21 (college)

Steven Russell Saulnier is an American football coach and former player. He currently serves as the assistant head coach and offensive line coach at the University of West Florida located in Pensacola, Florida. Saulnier has previously served as assistant head coach and offensive line coach at the University of North Carolina at Pembroke from 2006 to 2014 as well as head football coach at Malone College—now known as Malone University—in Canton Ohio from 1999 to 2001.

== Playing career ==
Saulnier played offensive line for the NC State Wolfpack football team from 1980 to 1984.

== Coaching career ==
=== High school coaching ===
Saulnier served as head coach at West Branch High School in Beloit, Ohio and assistant coach at Broughton High School in Raleigh, North Carolina.

=== College assistant coaching ===
Saulnier has worked in various assistant coaching roles at the collegiate level. His history has taken him to the University of Kansas as a graduate assistant, Brown University, the University of New Mexico under Dennis Franchione, and Malone College, where he became the head coach for three seasons.

Saulnier was also a key staff member for Geneva College successful 2002 Victory Bowl win over Northwestern College and presently is the offensive line coach at the University of North Carolina at Pembroke. He was one of the original coaches at Pembroke as football began at the school in 2007 with a roster of mostly freshmen and a few sophomores.

=== Malone College ===
Saulnier served in various coaching roles at Malone College (now Malone University) located in Canton, Ohio from 1993 until 1999 before being named the third head football coach for the Pioneers. He held that position for three seasons, from 1999 until 2001. His coaching record at Malone was 10 wins, 21 losses, and 0 ties. This ranks him fourth at Malone in total wins and fifth at Malone in winning percentage.

Saulnier's first year at Malone started with a pre-season national ranking of No. 4 in the NAIA and got off to a 2–0 record, but after being hit hard with injuries of key players the team suffered four consecutive losses and ended up with a 4–6 record.

== Personal life ==
Saulnier earned a bachelor's degree in Education from North Carolina State University and a master's degree in Physical Education at the University of New Mexico. He and his wife, Dianna, have two children, Jacob and Hannah. He has also served as an area director for the Fellowship of Christian Athletes in Canton, Ohio.

== Head coaching record ==
Year	Team	Overall	Conference	Standing	Bowl/playoffs
Malone Pioneers (Mid-States Football Association) (1999–2001)
1999	Malone	4–6	1–5	7th (Mideast)	
2000	Malone	4–7	2–4	T–5th (Mideast)	
2001	Malone	2–8	1–5	6th (Mideast)	
Malone:		10–21	4–14		
Total:		10–21			
