= Kavell Conner =

American gridiron football player (born 1987)

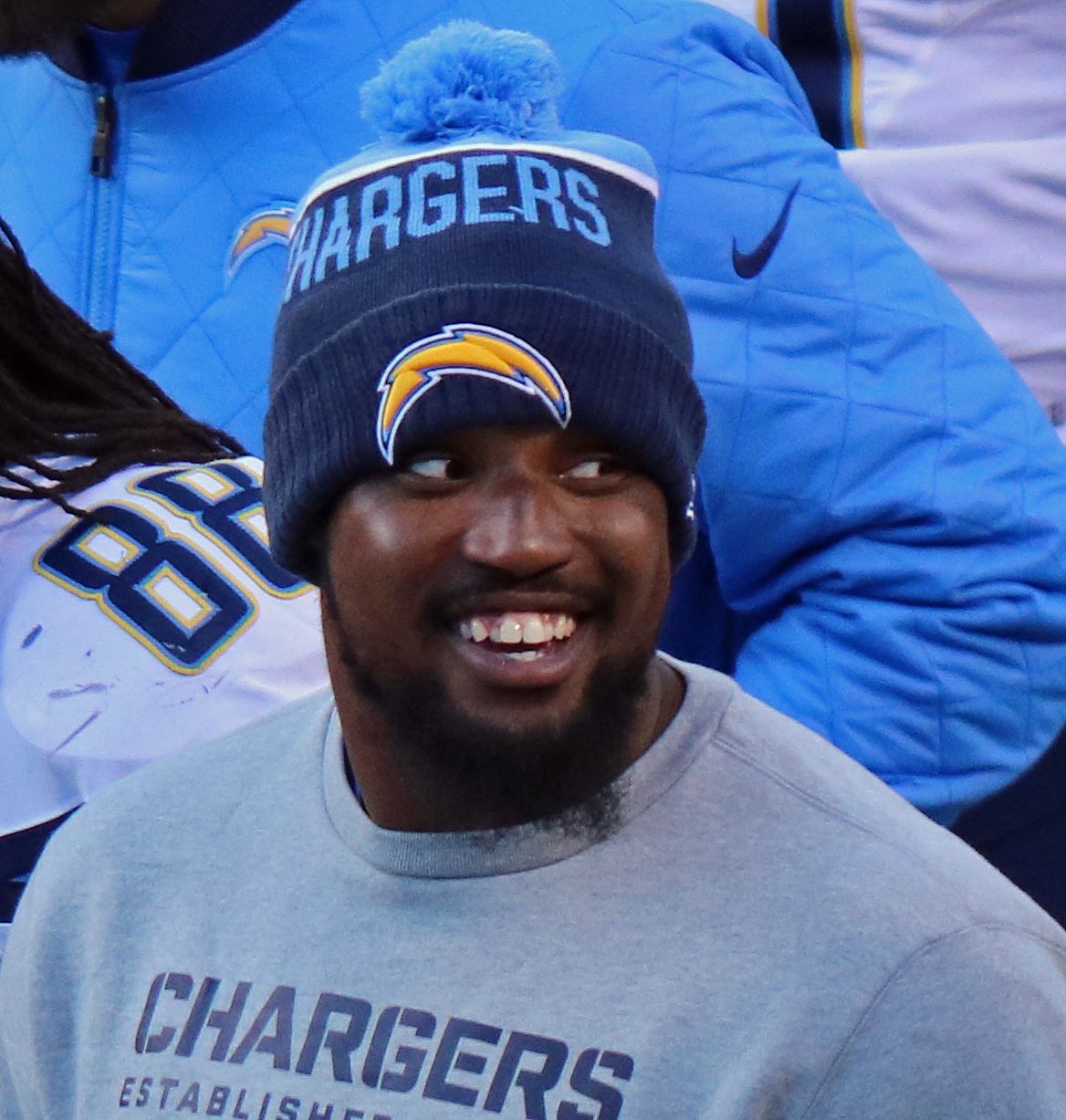
- Conner with the San Diego Chargers in 2016

West Florida Argonauts
- Title: Defensive coordinator & linebackers coach

Personal information
- Born: February 23, 1987 (age 39); Richmond, Virginia, U.S.
- Listed height: 6 ft 0 in (1.83 m)
- Listed weight: 245 lb (111 kg)

Career information
- High school: Manchester (Midlothian, Virginia)
- College: Clemson
- NFL draft: 2010: 7th round, 240th overall pick

Career history

Playing
- Indianapolis Colts (2010–2013); San Diego Chargers (2014–2015); Baltimore Ravens (2016)*; Hamilton Tiger-Cats (2017)
- * Offseason or practice squad member only

Coaching
- Clemson (2021–2022) Defensive player development; West Florida (2023–present) Defensive coordinator & linebackers coach

Career NFL statistics
- Total tackles: 328
- Sacks: 2
- Forced fumbles: 3
- Fumble recoveries: 3
- Pass deflections: 9
- Stats at Pro Football Reference
- Stats at CFL.ca

Kavell Conner (born February 23, 1987) is an American college football coach and former professional linebacker. He is the defensive coordinator and linebackers coach for the University of West Florida, positions he has held since 2023. He was selected by the Indianapolis Colts in the seventh round of the 2010 NFL draft. He played college football at Clemson.

== Professional career ==
=== Indianapolis Colts ===
Conner debut for the Indianapolis Colts was in 2010. During his stint with the Colts, Conner recorded 236 tackles, 2 forced fumbles, and one sack.

=== San Diego Chargers ===
Conner signed with the San Diego Chargers on March 13, 2014. On March 3, 2016, Conner was released by the Chargers.

=== Baltimore Ravens ===
On July 27, 2016, Conner signed with the Baltimore Ravens. On August 29, 2016, he was released.

=== Hamilton Tiger-Cats ===
On March 8, 2017, Conner signed with the Hamilton Tiger-Cats of the Canadian Football League (CFL).
