= West Florida Argonauts football =

Florida intercollegiate American football team

2026 West Florida Argonauts football team
- First season: 2016; 10 years ago
- Athletic director: Dave Scott
- Head coach: Kaleb Nobles; 4th season, 30–14 (.682)
- Location: Pensacola, Florida, U.S.
- Stadium: Pen Air Field
- NCAA division: Division I FCS
- Conference: UAC
- Colors: Royal blue and Kelly green
- All-time record: 86–35 (.711)

NCAA Division II championships
- 2019

Conference championships
- GSC: 2021, 2022, 2025
- Rivalries: Florida Tech (Coastal Classic); West Georgia (Borderline Brawl)
- Mascot: Argie the Argonaut
- Website: goargos.com/football

The West Florida Argonauts football program is the intercollegiate American football team that represents the University of West Florida in Pensacola, Florida. The Argonauts compete in the NCAA Division I Football Championship Subdivision (FCS) as members of the United Athletic Conference (UAC).

The program began play in 2016 and won the NCAA Division II Football Championship in 2019. West Florida competed at the Division II level as a member of the Gulf South Conference (GSC) through the 2025 season before transitioning to Division I. The Argonauts joined the United Athletic Conference beginning with the 2026 season. They play their home games at Pen Air Field and are led by head coach Kaleb Nobles.

As part of the NCAA’s reclassification process, West Florida is eligible to compete for the UAC championship but will not be eligible for the NCAA Division I FCS playoffs until the 2029 season.

== History ==
The University of West Florida launched its football program in 2016 under head coach Pete Shinnick. In only its fourth season, the Argonauts won the 2019 NCAA Division II national championship, defeating Minnesota State 48–40 in the title game.

West Florida competed in the Gulf South Conference from 2016 through 2025. During that span the Argonauts won three GSC championships (2021, 2022, and 2025) and made multiple NCAA Division II playoff appearances.

On April 2, 2026, the university announced it would reclassify to NCAA Division I, with football joining the United Athletic Conference. The move took effect on July 1, 2026, making the 2026 season West Florida’s first at the FCS level.

== Conference affiliations ==
- 2016–2025: Gulf South Conference (NCAA Division II)
- 2026–present: United Athletic Conference (Division I FCS)

== Head coaches ==
Tenure	Coach	Seasons	Record	Pct.
2016–2022	Pete Shinnick	6	56–21	.727
2023–present	Kaleb Nobles	4	28–11	.718
Totals		10	84–32	.724

== Seasons ==
Year	Team	Overall	Conference	Standing	Bowl/playoffs	AFCA^{#}	STATS^{°}
Pete Shinnick (Gulf South Conference) (2016–2022)
2016	West Florida	5–6	3–5	6th			
2017	West Florida	11–4	5–3	T–2nd	L NCAA Division II Championship	2	
2018	West Florida	6–5	4–4	5th			
2019	West Florida	13–2	7–1	2nd	W NCAA Division II Championship	1	
2020–21	No team—COVID-19						
2021	West Florida	9–2	6–1	T–1st	L NCAA Division II First Round	12	
2022	West Florida	12–2	6–1	T–1st	L NCAA Division II Semifinal	4	
Kaleb Nobles (Gulf South Conference) (2023–2025)
2023	West Florida	8–4	6–2	3rd	L NCAA Division II First Round	23	
2024	West Florida	7–3	5–2	3rd			
2025	West Florida	10–2	2–1	T–1st	L NCAA Division II Second Round	9	
Kaleb Nobles (United Athletic Conference) (2026–present)
2026	West Florida	5–5	2–5	7th			
Total:		86–35					
National championship Conference title Conference division title or championship game berth
^{#}Rankings from final AFCA poll (Division II through 2025; FCS Coaches from 2026).; ^{°}Rankings from final STATS FCS poll.

== Championships ==
=== National championships ===
Year	Association	Division	Head coach	Record	Opponent	Result
2019	NCAA (1)	Division II (1)	Pete Shinnick	13–2 (7–1 GSC)	Minnesota State	W, 48–40

=== Conference championships ===
Year	Conference	Head coach	Overall record	Conference record	Title type
2021	Gulf South Conference	Pete Shinnick	9–2	6–1	Co-champions
2022	Gulf South Conference	Pete Shinnick	12–2	6–1	Co-champions
2025	Gulf South Conference	Kaleb Nobles	10–2	2–1	Co-champions (Note: The GSC charged Valdosta State with a conference loss to West Alabama for use of an ineligible player, leaving both teams 2–1. Valdosta State took the automatic bid on the head-to-head result.)

== Rivalries ==
=== Florida Tech ===
West Florida and Florida Tech played the Coastal Classic from 2016 to 2019, a trophy game between the only NCAA Division II football programs in Florida. West Florida won the series 3–1. Florida Tech discontinued football in 2020.

=== West Georgia ===
West Florida and West Georgia, former Gulf South Conference rivals, announced in November 2026 that their annual United Athletic Conference game would be branded the Borderline Brawl. The named series was initiated by the presidents and athletic directors of both schools to renew the matchup and build tradition as both programs transitioned to NCAA Division I FCS.

Prior to the naming of the series, the teams met eight times between 2016 and 2023, with West Florida holding a 5–3 lead. The inaugural Borderline Brawl was played on November 21, 2026, at University Stadium @ Ra-Lin Field in Carrollton, Georgia, where West Florida defeated West Georgia 24–16.

== Current Coaching staff ==
Name	Title
Kaleb Nobles	Head coach
Steve Saulnier	Assistant head coach / offensive line
Donny Baker	Offensive coordinator / wide receivers
Kavell Conner	Defensive coordinator / linebackers
Jordan Remsza	Special teams coordinator / defensive backs
Lucas Melo	Recruiting coordinator / defensive line
Joe Wintrick	Director of football operations / running backs / tight ends
Vincent Jefferies	Wide receivers
Jake Lange	Quarterbacks
Levi Johnson	Running backs / tight ends
Ryan Hunt	Offensive line
Jason Manary	Linebackers
McGrew Fortune	Defensive backs
DJ Thomas	Linebackers

== Facilities ==
Pen Air Field is a stadium located on the campus of the University of West Florida in Pensacola, Florida and the home of the West Florida Argonauts football program. The field was built in February 2016 and was used mainly for practices for the football team.

For the first six years of the program's history, the home games were played at Blue Wahoos Stadium until there was a scheduling conflict with one game in 2021 with Pensacola Blue Wahoos. On February 28, 2022, the university announced that they moved all the home games for the 2022 season to Pen Air Field, in hope to also increase student attendance.

The first game held at Pen Air Field was on September 11, 2021, against Southwest Baptist, where the Argonauts defeated the Bearcats, 63–14. The attendance to the game was 5,463. The university installed portable bleachers, video board, play clocks and fans around the field.

The 120-yard surface serves as both the home field and primary practice facility for the football program and is also utilized by the university’s strength and conditioning staff for all 15 intercollegiate sports. In September 2016, the university announced a $1 million gift from Pen Air Credit Union to support the football program and secure naming rights for the facility.

Pen Air Field has since hosted UWF regular season games and multiple NCAA Division II Football Championship playoff contests. In addition to collegiate athletics, the venue has been used for youth flag football, combines, university functions, and community events. In 2023, the field was upgraded with a new custom AstroTurf playing surface featuring updated design elements and team branding.

The facility is currently undergoing redevelopment as Darrell Gooden Stadium is being constructed around the existing field. The stadium is scheduled to open in fall 2027 and is expected to accommodate approximately 10,000 spectators, including 7,500 permanent seats, along with premium seating, club areas, and suites. As part of the phased development, an 85-foot by 30-foot high-definition LED video board will be installed in the north end zone in summer 2026 to enhance the game-day experience.

== Future non-conference opponents ==
Announced schedules as of November 18, 2026.

2027	2028	2029
at Southern Illinois	at Southeastern Louisiana	at Arkansas
Mississippi Valley State		Southeastern Louisiana
at Montana		
West Alabama		
