= Fred Robbins =

American football player (born 1977)

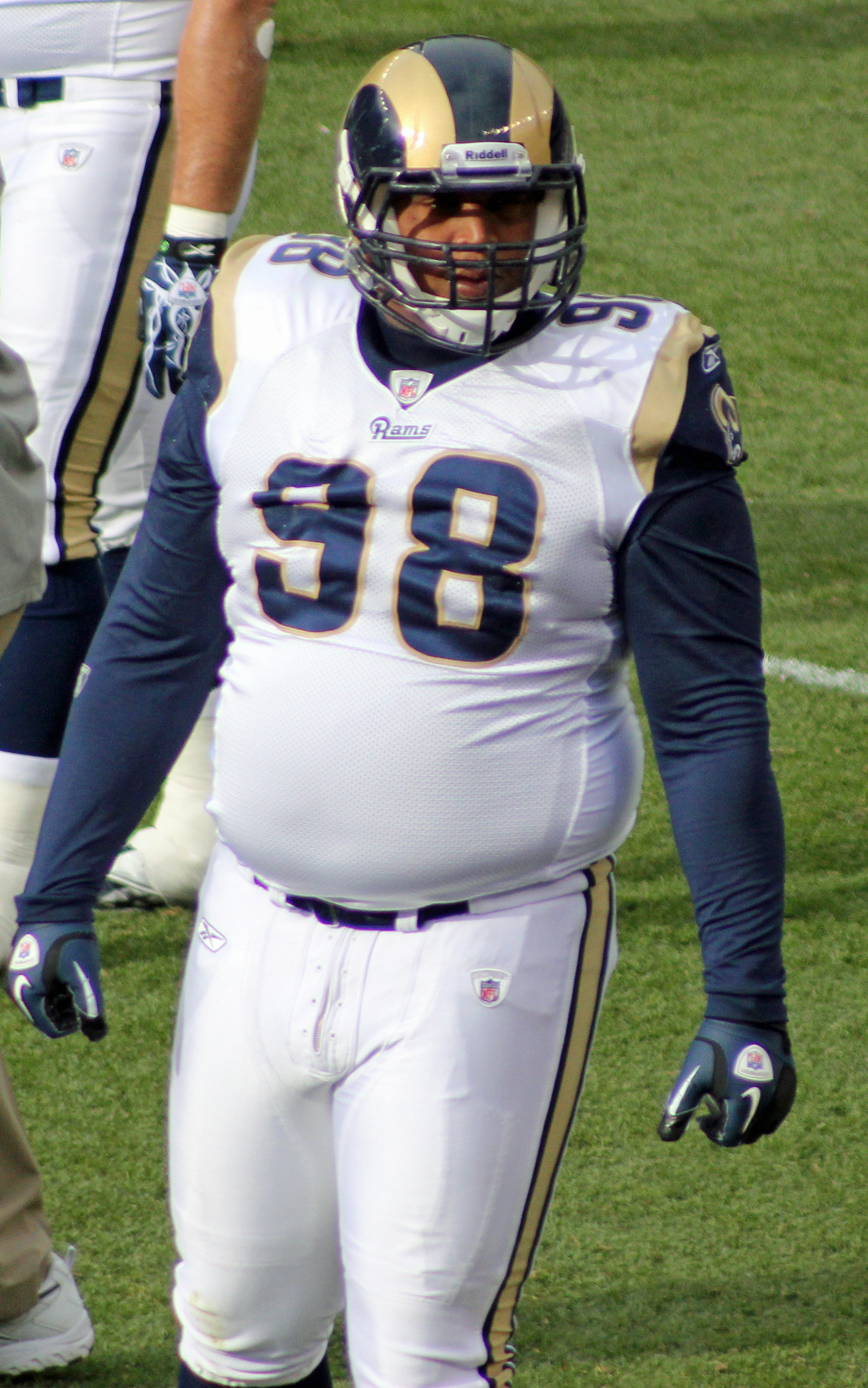
- Robbins with the St. Louis Rams in 2010

No. 98
- Position: Defensive tackle

Personal information
- Born: March 25, 1977 (age 49); Pensacola, Florida, U.S.
- Listed height: 6 ft 4 in (1.93 m)
- Listed weight: 322 lb (146 kg)

Career information
- High school: J. M. Tate (Cantonment, Florida)
- College: Wake Forest
- NFL draft: 2000: 2nd round, 55th overall pick

Career history
- Minnesota Vikings (2000–2003); New York Giants (2004–2009); St. Louis Rams (2010–2011)

Awards and highlights
- Super Bowl champion (XLII); Sports Illustrated All-Pro (2008); Second-team All-ACC (1999)

Career NFL statistics
- Total tackles: 370
- Sacks: 35.5
- Forced fumbles: 3
- Fumble recoveries: 8
- Interceptions: 3
- Stats at Pro Football Reference

Frederick D. Robbins (born March 25, 1977) is an American former professional football player who was a defensive tackle in the National Football League (NFL). He played college football for the Wake Forest Demon Deacons and was selected by the Minnesota Vikings in the second round of the 2000 NFL draft.

Robbins also played for the New York Giants and St. Louis Rams.

== Early life ==
Robbins attended J. M. Tate High School in Pensacola, Florida and was a student and a letterman in football and baseball. In football, he was a three-year letterman and as a senior, he was an All-City selection and an All-Northwest Florida selection.

== College career ==
Robbins started every game for three years at defensive tackle and finished his career with 15 quarterback sacks and 44 tackles-for-loss. He was a Second-team All-ACC choice as a senior. He helped the Demon Deacons’ defense improve from 9th to 2nd in the ACC in 1999.

== Professional career ==
Pre-draft measurables
Height	Weight	Arm length	Hand span	40-yard dash	10-yard split	20-yard split	20-yard shuttle	Three-cone drill	Vertical jump	Broad jump	Bench press
6 ft 3 3/4 in (1.92 m)	312 lb (142 kg)	32 in (0.81 m)	11 in (0.28 m)	5.05 s	1.75 s	2.93 s	4.72 s	7.72 s	29.5 in (0.75 m)	7 ft 10 in (2.39 m)	25 reps
All values from NFL Combine

=== Minnesota Vikings ===
Robbins was selected on the second round of the 2000 NFL draft by the Minnesota Vikings with the 55th overall pick. He signed a four-year $5.5 million deal with the Vikings. As a rookie in 2000, played in 8 games as a reserve and had 5 tackles and one sack. In 2001, played in 16 games with 12 starts and had 45 tackles (16 solo) and 2 sacks. In 2002, played in 16 games with 15 starts for the Vikings and recorded 41 tackles (23 solo). Robbins led the team with 7 tackles for loss and had a career-high 4 passes defensed. In 2003, he played in all 16 games with 12 starts for the Vikings and finished with 30 tackles, 5 tackles for loss, and 5 quarterback hurries and recovered one fumble.

=== New York Giants ===
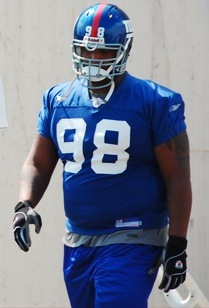
Robbins with the New York Giants in 2007

On March 7, 2004, Robbins signed with the New York Giants for six years and $20 million, including a $4 million bonus. In his first season with the Giants in 2004, he started all 15 games and recorded 40 tackles (31 solo), 5 sacks, 1 interception, 2 passes defensed and 2 forced fumble. In 2005, played in all 16 regular season games with 6 starts at defensive tackle and finished the season with 23 tackles (14 solo), 1.5 sacks, 1 pass defensed and 1 fumble recovery. In 2006, Robbins started all 16 regular season games and the NFC Wild Card Game and finished with career-high totals of 62 tackles (39 solo), 5.5 sacks, 2 interceptions and 34 quarterback hurries. In 2007, he played in 16 regular season with 15 starts and started all 4 postseason games and finished with 42 tackles (21 solo), 5.5 sacks, 26 quarterback hurries, 10 quarterback hits and 1 pass defensed.

Robbins was also picked by his teammates to be a defensive captain for the 2008 season. In 2008, he started in all 14 regular season games in which he played and had 36 tackles (24 solo), 5.5 sacks and 3 passes defensed. It was the 3rd consecutive season he finished with 5.5 sacks, his career high. He was named to the 2008 Sports Illustrated All-Pro team.

Robbins had microfracture surgery following the 2008 season, and managed just two sacks in 16 games in 2009.

=== St. Louis Rams ===
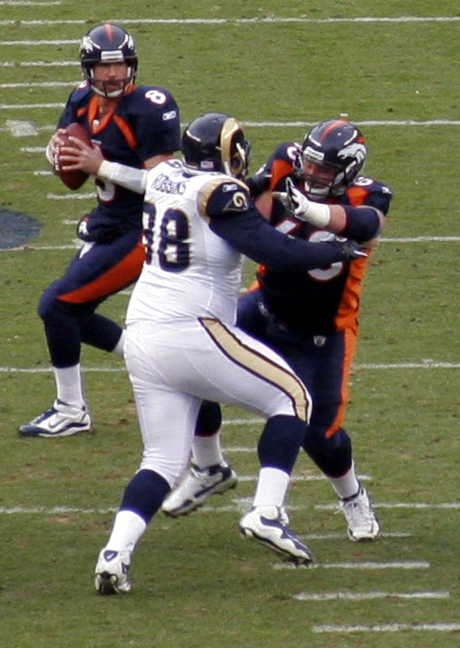
Robbins taking on guard Zane Beadles en route to pressuring Kyle Orton on Nov 28, 2010.

Robbins signed a three-year $11.3 million contract with the St. Louis Rams. The deal included a roster bonus of $3.4 million. He was released following the 2011 season on March 12, 2012.

=== NFL statistics ===
Year	Team	Games	Combined tackles	Tackles	Assisted tackles	Sacks	Forced fumbles	Fumble recoveries
2000	MIN	8	3	1	2	1.0	0	0
2001	MIN	16	27	18	9	2.0	0	0
2002	MIN	16	32	18	14	0.0	0	0
2003	MIN	16	28	21	7	0.5	1	1
2004	NYG	15	39	30	9	5.0	2	0
2005	NYG	16	26	17	9	1.5	0	1
2006	NYG	16	45	31	14	5.5	0	3
2007	NYG	16	42	31	11	5.5	0	0
2008	NYG	14	36	29	7	5.5	0	0
2009	NYG	16	25	21	4	2.0	0	1
2010	STL	16	28	26	2	6.0	1	2
2011	STL	15	29	21	8	1.0	0	0
Career		180	360	264	96	35.5	4	8

== Personal life ==
Robbins and his wife Tia founded Mr. Robbins Neighborhood, a nonprofit organization that helps high school athletes in the Pensacola area prepare for life after their sports careers. The couple have two sons together.
