= 2026 Jacksonville State Gamecocks football team =

American college football season

2026 Jacksonville State Gamecocks football

C-USA Championship, at Liberty
- Conference: Conference USA
- Record: 8–3 (6–1 C-USA)
- Head coach: Charles Kelly (2nd season)
- Offensive coordinator: Taylor Housewright (1st season)
- Offensive scheme: Multiple
- Defensive coordinator: Brian Williams (2nd season)
- Base defense: 4–3
- Home stadium: AmFirst Stadium

2026 Conference USA football standings
	Conf.			Overall
Team	W		L	W		L
Liberty y	7	–	0	10	–	1
Jacksonville State y	6	–	1	8	–	3
Delaware	4	–	3	6	–	5
Middle Tennessee	4	–	3	6	–	5
Kennesaw State	4	–	3	5	–	6
Missouri State	3	–	4	4	–	7
Western Kentucky	3	–	4	4	–	7
FIU	2	–	5	4	–	7
New Mexico State	2	–	5	3	–	8
Sam Houston	0	–	7	1	–	10
Championship: Jacksonville State at Liberty
y – Championship game participant; As of November 22, 2026; Rankings from AP poll

The 2026 Jacksonville State Gamecocks football team represents Jacksonville State University as a member of Conference USA (C-USA) during the 2026 NCAA Division I FBS football season. The Gamecocks are led by second-year head coach Charles Kelly. They play their home games at AmFirst Stadium, located in Jacksonville, Alabama.

== Offseason ==
On December 19, 2025, offensive coordinator Clint Trickett was hired as the quarterbacks coach at Arkansas. Tight ends coach Taylor Housewright was promoted to offensive coordinator on December 22.

== Schedule ==
Date	Time	Opponent	Site	TV	Result	Attendance
August 29	4:30 p.m.	at North Dakota State*	Fargodome; Fargo, ND	CBSSN	L 7–33	18,537
September 5	6:00 p.m.	Eastern Kentucky*	AmFirst Stadium; Jacksonville, AL	ESPN+	W 49–7	19,677
September 12	5:00 p.m.	at Ohio*	Peden Stadium; Athens, OH	ESPN+	L 27–29 ^{4OT}	21,037
September 19	6:00 p.m.	Georgia Southern*	AmFirst Stadium; Jacksonville, AL	ESPN+	W 31–27	16,142
September 26	6:00 p.m.	Middle Tennessee	AmFirst Stadium; Jacksonville, AL	ESPN+	W 23–13	16,977
October 7	6:00 p.m.	at Kennesaw State	Fifth Third Stadium; Kennesaw, GA (rivalry)	CBSSN	W 27–26	10,225
October 13	7:00 p.m.	FIU	AmFirst Stadium; Jacksonville, AL	ESPNU	W 27–24	17,224
October 28	7:00 p.m.	at New Mexico State	Aggie Memorial Stadium; Las Cruces, NM	ESPN2	W 24–0	6,511
November 7	6:00 p.m.	Sam Houston^{†}	AmFirst Stadium; Jacksonville, AL	CBSSN	W 47–14	20,476
November 14	2:30 p.m.	at Western Kentucky	Houchens Industries–L. T. Smith Stadium; Bowling Green, KY	ESPN+	L 24–34	10,112
November 21	1:00 p.m.	Missouri State	AmFirst Stadium; Jacksonville, AL	ESPN+	W 25–20	16,307
November 28	2:30 p.m.	at Delaware	Delaware Stadium; Newark, DE	CBSSN		
December 4		at Liberty	Williams Stadium; Lynchburg, VA (CUSA Championship Game)			
*Non-conference game; ^{†}Homecoming; All times are in Central time

== Game summaries ==
=== at North Dakota State ===
Jacksonville State Gamecocks (0–0) at North Dakota State Bison (0–0) – Game summary

Quarter	1	2	3	4	Total
Gamecocks	7	0	0	0	7
Bison	7	10	10	6	33

at Fargodome • Fargo, North Dakota

- Date: August 29
- Game time: 4:30 p.m. CDT
- Game weather: none (played indoors)
- Game attendance: 18,537
- Referee: Patrick Foy
- TV announcers (CBSSN): Rich Waltz, Adam Breneman, Brian Kelly and Jordan Giorgio

Game information

First quarter

- NDSU – Reis Kessel 6-yard pass from Nathan Hayes (Drew Klein kick), 15:00. North Dakota State 7–0. Drive: 8 plays, 75 yards, 4:51.
- JVST – Caden Creel 8-yard run (Garrison Rippa kick), 4:16. Tied 7–7. Drive: 6 plays, 64 yards, 2:35.

Second quarter

- NDSU – Drew Klein 34-yard field goal, 10:46. North Dakota State 10–7. Drive: 14 plays, 49 yards, 8:23.
- NDSU – Jordan McCants 44-yard pass from Nathan Hayes (Drew Klein kick), 0:18. North Dakota State 17–7. Drive: 8 plays, 88 yards, 1:24.

Third quarter

- NDSU – Drew Klein 44-yard field goal, 6:59. North Dakota State 20–7. Drive: 7 plays, 30 yards, 4:15.
- NDSU – Blake Schiltz 0-yard fumble return (Drew Klein kick), 6:41. North Dakota State 27–7. Drive: 2 plays, -25 yards, 0:18.

Fourth quarter

- NDSU – Drew Klein 42-yard field goal, 13:31. North Dakota State 30–7. Drive: 12 plays, 75 yards, 5:15.
- NDSU – Drew Klein 48-yard field goal, 2:17. North Dakota State 33–7. Drive: 11 plays, 35 yards, 7:10.

Statistics	JVST	NDSU
First downs	14	20
Plays–yards	55–170	71–373
Rushes–yards	31–85	44–209
Passing yards	85	164
Passing: comp–att–int	12–23–1	15–23–1
Turnovers	2	1
Time of possession	23:53	36:07

Team	Category	Player	Statistics
Jacksonville State	Passing	Caden Creel	12/23, 85 yards, INT
Jacksonville State	Rushing	Jalen Likely	11 carries, 48 yards
Jacksonville State	Receiving	Deondre Johnson	2 receptions, 26 yards
North Dakota State	Passing	Nathan Hayes	14/22, 160 yards, 2 TD, INT
North Dakota State	Rushing	Myles Mitchell	11 carries, 74 yards
North Dakota State	Receiving	Jackson Williams	5 receptions, 58 yards

=== Eastern Kentucky (FCS) ===
Eastern Kentucky Colonels (FCS) (0–1) at Jacksonville State Gamecocks (0–1) – Game summary

Quarter	1	2	3	4	Total
Colonels (FCS)	0	7	0	0	7
Gamecocks	14	21	7	7	49

at AmFirst Stadium • Jacksonville, Alabama

- Date: September 5
- Game time: 6:00 p.m.
- Game weather: Sunny • Temperature: 96 °F (36 °C) • Wind: 0 mph
- Game attendance: 19,677
- Referee: Stuart Mullins
- TV announcers (ESPN+): Eli Gold, Jeff Burger and Erica Schoeman

Game information

First quarter

- JVST – Jamill Williams 13-yard pass from Caden Creel (Garrison Rippa kick), 6:27. Jacksonville State 7–0. Drive: 13 plays, 70 yards, 4:35.
- JVST – Jamill Williams 55-yard pass from Caden Creel (Garrison Rippa kick), 4:25. Jacksonville State 14–0. Drive: 2 plays, 74 yards, 0:43.

Second quarter

- JVST – Jamill Williams 30-yard pass from Caden Creel (Garrison Rippa kick), 12:24. Jacksonville State 21–0. Drive: 8 plays, 91 yards, 2:47.
- JVST – Caleb Nix 43-yard interception return (Garrison Rippa kick), 10:27. Jacksonville State 28–0.
- EKU – Brady Hensley 72-yard run (Buzz Flabiano kick), 9:45 Jacksonville State 28–7. Drive: 2 plays, 70 yards, 0:35.
- JVST – Jalen Likely 45-yard run (Garrison Rippa kick), 5:28 Jacksonville State 35–7. Drive: 8 plays, 75 yards, 4:10.

Third quarter

- JVST – Luke Gilbert 24-yard pass from Caden Creel (Garrison Rippa kick), 6:03. Jacksonville State 42–7. Drive: 10 plays, 83 yards, 4:39.

Fourth quarter

- JVST – Jamill Williams 4-yard pass from Caden Creel (Garrison Rippa kick), 7:09 Jacksonville State 49–7. Drive: 7 plays, 59 yards, 4:17.

Statistics	EKU	JVST
First downs	16	26
Plays–yards	57–285	61–526
Rushes–yards	38–195	31–174
Passing yards	90	352
Passing: comp–att–int	12–19–2	23–30–1
Turnovers	2	1
Time of possession	33:27	26:33

Team	Category	Player	Statistics
Eastern Kentucky	Passing	Tyler Travers	12/19, 90 yards, 2 INT
Eastern Kentucky	Rushing	Brady Hensley	7 carries, 91 yards, TD
Eastern Kentucky	Receiving	Simon Ghee	2 receptions, 12 yards
Jacksonville State	Passing	Caden Creel	21/28, 327 yards, 5 TD, INT
Jacksonville State	Rushing	Jalen Likely	5 carries, 73 yards, TD
Jacksonville State	Receiving	Jamill Williams	7 receptions, 144 yards, 4 TD

=== at Ohio ===
Jacksonville State Gamecocks (1–1) at Ohio Bobcats (0–1) – Game summary

Quarter	1	2	3	4	OT	2OT	3OT	4OT	Total
Gamecocks	7	10	7	0	0	3	0	0	27
Bobcats	0	14	0	10	0	3	0	2	29

at Peden Stadium • Athens, Ohio

- Date: September 12
- Game time: 5:00 p.m.
- Game weather: Cloudy, Temperature:80 °F (27 °C), Wind:CALM 0 mph (0 km/h)
- Game attendance: 21,037
- Referee: Marcel Kerr
- TV announcers (ESPN+): Joe Tordy and LaDarrin McLane

Game information

First quarter

- JVST – Caden Creel 8-yard run (Garrison Rippa kick), 4:54. Jacksonville State 7–0. Drive: 13 plays, 88 yards, 6:33.

Second quarter

- JVST – Luke Gilbert 82-yard pass from Caden Creel (Garrison Rippa kick), 14:36. Jacksonville State 14–0. Drive: 1 play, 82 yards, 0:12.
- OHIO – Riley Neer 8-yard pass from Matt Vezza (Brack Peacock kick), 7:28. Jacksonville State 14–7. Drive: 13 plays, 65 yards, 7:08.
- JVST – Garrison Rippa 22-yard field goal, 0:57. Jacksonville State 17–7. Drive: 14 plays, 71 yards, 6:31.
- OHIO – Darren James-Hamilton 98-yard kickoff return (Will Hyrszko kick), 0:44. Jacksonville State 17–14. Drive: 1 play, 98 yards, 0:00.

Third quarter

- JVST – Khristian Lando 4-yard run (Garrison Rippa kick), 7:57. Jacksonville State 24–14. Drive: 14 plays, 73 yards, 6:56.

Fourth quarter

- OHIO – Will Hyrszko 23-yard field goal, 14:57. Jacksonville State 24–17. Drive: 13 plays, 70 yards, 8:00.
- OHIO – Victor Rosa 1-yard run (Will Hyrszko kick), 1:34. Tied 24–24. Drive: 18 plays, 90 yards, 8:50.

First overtime

- No scoring plays.

Second overtime

- OHIO – Will Hyrszko 43-yard field goal. Ohio 27–24. Drive: 4 plays, 0 yards.
- JVST – Garrison Rippa 28-yard field goal. Tied 27–27. Drive: 6 plays, 15 yards.

Third overtime

- No scoring plays.

Fourth overtime

- OHIO – Levi Davis two-point rush. Ohio 29–27. Drive: 1 play, 0 yards.

Statistics	JVST	OHIO
First downs	22	17
Plays–yards	80–447	80–262
Rushes–yards	46–161	46–165
Passing yards	286	97
Passing: comp–att–int	20–26–0	13–20–0
Turnovers	1	0
Time of possession	28:25	31:35

Team	Category	Player	Statistics
Jacksonville State	Passing	Caden Creel	18/24, 265 yards, TD
Jacksonville State	Rushing	Caden Creel	29 carries, 120 yards, TD
Jacksonville State	Receiving	Luke Gilbert	1 reception, 82 yards, TD
Ohio	Passing	Matt Vezza	10/12, 80 yards, TD
Ohio	Rushing	Matt Vezza	12 carries, 67 yards
Ohio	Receiving	Riley Neer	4 receptions, 38 yards, TD

=== Georgia Southern ===
Georgia Southern Eagles (1–1) at Jacksonville State Gamecocks (1–2) – Game summary

Quarter	1	2	3	4	Total
Eagles	3	21	3	0	27
Gamecocks	0	10	7	14	31

at AmFirst Stadium • Jacksonville, Alabama

- Date: September 19
- Game time: 6:00 p.m.
- Game attendance: 16,142
- Referee: Rodney Burnette
- TV announcers (ESPN+): Eli Gold, Jeff Burger and Erica Schoeman

Game information

First quarter

- GASO – Tripp Bryant 22-yard field goal, 7:08. Georgia Southern 3–0. Drive: 14 plays, 71 yards, 7:52.

Second quarter

- GASO – Weston Bryan 10-yard run (Tripp Bryant kick), 12:30. Georgia Southern 10–0. Drive: 7 plays, 50 yards, 2:23.
- GASO – Weston Bryan 2-yard run (Tripp Bryant kick), 9:50. Georgia Southern 17–0. Drive: 6 plays, 22 yards, 2:26.
- JVST – Jalen Likely 13-yard pass from Caden Creel (Garrison Rippa kick), 7:09. Georgia Southern 17–7. Drive: 5 plays, 75 yards, 2:41.
- JVST – Garrison Rippa 35-yard field goal, 2:07. Georgia Southern 17–10. Drive: 7 plays, 75 yards, 2:56.
- GASO – Weston Bryan 2-yard run (Tripp Bryant kick), 0:32. Georgia Southern 24–10. Drive: 7 plays, 75 yards, 1:32.

Third quarter

- JVST – Deondre Johnson 18-yard pass from Caden Creel (Garrison Rippa kick), 7:45. Georgia Southern 24–17. Drive: 13 plays, 75 yards, 7:15.
- GASO – Tripp Bryant 43-yard field goal, 2:06. Georgia Southern 27–17. Drive: 10 plays, 61 yards, 5:33.

Fourth quarter

- JVST – Lucas Farrington 26-yard run (Garrison Rippa kick), 11:17. Georgia Southern 27–24. Drive: 4 plays, 53 yards, 1:33.
- JVST – Caleb Nix 75-yard punt return (Garrison Rippa kick), 8:16. Jacksonville State 31–27. Drive: 5 plays, 13 yards, 3:01.

Statistics	GASO	JVST
First downs	22	17
Plays–yards	74–369	50–302
Rushes–yards	39–182	25–108
Passing yards	187	194
Passing: comp–att–int	23–33–1	17–24–0
Turnovers	1	1
Time of possession	36:23	23:37

Team	Category	Player	Statistics
Georgia Southern	Passing	Max Johnson	23/33, 187 yards, INT
Georgia Southern	Rushing	David Mbadinga	18 carries, 103 yards
Georgia Southern	Receiving	Josh Dallas	7 receptions, 43 yards
Jacksonville State	Passing	Caden Creel	17/24, 194 yards, 2 TD
Jacksonville State	Rushing	Lucas Farrington	4 carries, 44 yards, TD
Jacksonville State	Receiving	Darius Cannon	5 receptions, 54 yards

=== Middle Tennessee ===
Middle Tennessee Blue Raiders (2–1) at Jacksonville State Gamecocks (2–2) – Game summary

Quarter	1	2	3	4	Total
Blue Raiders	0	7	6	0	13
Gamecocks	3	7	10	3	23

at AmFirst Stadium • Jacksonville, Alabama

- Date: September 26
- Game time: 6:00 p.m.
- Game weather: Sunny • Temperature: 78 °F (26 °C) • Wind: N at 6 miles per hour (9.7 km/h)
- Game attendance: 16,977
- Referee: Ron Hudson
- TV announcers (ESPN+): Eli Gold (play-by-play), Jeff Burger (analyst) and Erica Schoeman (sideline)

Game information

First quarter

- JVST – Garrison Rippa 27-yard field goal, 7:14. Jacksonville State 3–0. Drive: 8 plays, 67 yards, 3:59.

Second quarter

- JVST – Caden Creel 1-yard run (Garrison Rippa kick), 6:50. Jacksonville State 10–0. Drive: 9 plays, 62 yards, 3:40.
- MTSU – Cam'ron Lacy 5-yard pass from Roman Gagliano (Dominic Bourgeois kick), 0:27. Jacksonville State 10–7. Drive: 14 plays, 90 yards, 6:17.

Third quarter

- MTSU – Markus Allen 32-yard pass from Roman Gagliano (Two-point run conversion failed), 10:11. Middle Tennessee 13–10. Drive: 9 plays, 75 yards, 4:49.
- JVST – Garrison Rippa 31-yard field goal, 5:43. Tied 13–13. Drive: 10 plays, 62 yards, 4:28.
- JVST – Deondre Johnson 38-yard pass from Caden Creel (Garrison Rippa kick), 5:43. Jacksonville State 20–13. Drive: 7 plays, 76 yards, 3:27.

Fourth quarter

- JVST – Garrison Rippa 29-yard field goal, 2:46. Jacksonville State 23–13. Drive: 12 plays, 69 yards, 7:17.

Statistics	MTSU	JVST
First downs	20	25
Plays–yards	58–319	70–517
Rushes–yards	30–103	39–276
Passing yards	103	276
Passing: comp–att–int	18–28–0	19–27–2
Turnovers	0	2
Time of possession	27:22	32:38

Team	Category	Player	Statistics
Middle Tennessee	Passing	Roman Gagliano	18/28, 216 yards, 2 TD
Middle Tennessee	Rushing	Antonio Martin	17 carries, 106 yards
Middle Tennessee	Receiving	Cam'ron Lacy	8 receptions, 88 yards, TD
Jacksonville State	Passing	Caden Creel	19/27, 241 yards, TD, 2 INT
Jacksonville State	Rushing	Caden Creel	12 carries, 119 yards, TD
Jacksonville State	Receiving	Darius Cannon	6 receptions, 48 yards

=== at Kennesaw State (rivalry) ===
Jacksonville State Gamecocks (3–2) at Kennesaw State Owls (1–3) – Game summary

Quarter	1	2	3	4	Total
Gamecocks	0	14	7	6	27
Owls	3	13	7	3	26

at Fifth Third Stadium • Kennesaw, Georgia

- Date: October 7
- Game time: 6:00 p.m.
- Game weather: Sunny • Temperature: 73 °F (23 °C) • Wind: SE at 4 miles per hour (6.4 km/h)
- Game attendance: 10,225
- Referee: Stuart Mullins
- TV announcers (CBSSN): Chris Lewis (play-by-play) and Taylor McHargue (analyst)

Game information

First quarter

- KENN – Daniel Kinney 20-yard field goal, 6:44. Kennesaw State 3–0. Drive: 15 plays, 73 yards, 8:16.

Second quarter

- JVST – Jamill Williams 1-yard pass from Caden Creel (Garrison Rippa kick), 14:37. Jacksonville State 7–3. Drive: 14 plays, 75 yards, 7:07.
- KENN – Rickie Collins 2-yard run (Daniel Kinney kick missed), 12:19. Kennesaw State 9–7. Drive: 4 plays, 75 yards, 2:18.
- JVST – Caden Creel 2-yard run (Garrison Rippa kick), 4:30. Jacksonville State 14–9. Drive: 4 plays, 71 yards, 2:18.
- KENN – Javon Rogers 5-yard pass from Rickie Collins (Daniel Kinney kick), 0:23. Kennesaw State 16–14. Drive: 7 plays, 53 yards, 0:53.

Third quarter

- KENN – Latrelle Murrell 4-yard run (Daniel Kinney kick), 1:30. Kennesaw State 23–14. Drive: 8 plays, 74 yards, 3:27.
- JVST – Jalen Likely 3-yard run (Garrison Rippa kick), 0:26. Kennesaw State 23–21. Drive: 4 plays, 75 yards, 1:02.

Fourth quarter

- JVST – Garrison Rippa 20-yard field goal, 9:23. Jacksonville State 24–23. Drive: 13 plays, 75 yards, 4:39.
- KENN – Daniel Kinney 28-yard field goal, 2:15. Kennesaw State 26–24. Drive: 9 plays, 50 yards, 4:03.
- JVST – Garrison Rippa 33-yard field goal, 0:52. Jacksonville State 27–26. Drive: 11 plays, 60 yards, 1:23.

Statistics	JVST	KENN
First downs	27	22
Plays–yards	76–385	67–410
Rushes–yards	30–74	30–117
Passing yards	311	293
Passing: comp–att–int	26–44–1	24–35–2
Turnovers	2	2
Time of possession	29:02	30:58

Team	Category	Player	Statistics
Jacksonville State	Passing	Caden Creel	26/44, 311 yards, TD, INT
Jacksonville State	Rushing	Jalen Likely	11 carries, 40 yards, TD
Jacksonville State	Receiving	Deondre Johnson	4 receptions, 112 yards
Kennesaw State	Passing	Rickie Collins	24/34, 293 yards, TD, 2 INT
Kennesaw State	Rushing	Rickie Collins	15 carries, 61 yards, TD
Kennesaw State	Receiving	Brayden Munroe	7 receptions, 159 yards

=== FIU ===
FIU Panthers (3–2) at Jacksonville State Gamecocks (4–2) – Game summary

Quarter	1	2	3	4	Total
Panthers	7	10	7	0	24
Gamecocks	14	3	7	3	27

at AmFirst Stadium • Jacksonville, Alabama

- Date: October 13
- Game time: 7:00 p.m.
- Game weather: Sunny • Temperature: 85 °F (29 °C) • Wind: SW at 0 miles per hour (0 km/h)
- Game attendance: 17,224
- Referee: Douglas Mercer
- TV announcers (ESPNU): Peter Sousa (play-by-play) and Leger Douzable (analyst)

Game information

First quarter

- JVST – Luke Gilbert 38-yard pass from Caden Creel (Garrison Rippa kick), 11:45. Jacksonville State 7–0. Drive: 6 plays, 63 yards, 3:07.
- FIU – Maguire Anderson 50-yard pass from J. J. Kohl (Robert Czeremcha kick), 4:43. Tied 7–7. Drive: 6 plays, 73 yards, 2:20.
- JVST – Deondre Johnson 36-yard pass from Caden Creel (Garrison Rippa kick), 1:48. Jacksonville State 14–7. Drive: 5 plays, 76 yards, 2:50.

Second quarter

- JVST – Garrison Rippa 47-yard field goal, 13:37. Jacksonville State 17–7. Drive: 5 plays, 18 yards, 1:34.
- FIU – Robert Czeremcha 33-yard field goal, 6:51. Jacksonville State 17–10. Drive: 13 plays, 60 yards, 6:46.
- FIU – Maguire Anderson 30-yard pass from J. J. Kohl (Robert Czeremcha kick), 1:41. Tied 17–17. Drive: 8 plays, 52 yards, 2:46.

Third quarter

- JVST – Justus Savage 4-yard run (Garrison Rippa kick), 8:02. Jacksonville State 24–17. Drive: 5 plays, 46 yards, 2:07.
- FIU – Devonte Lyons 8-yard run (Robert Czeremcha kick), 1:06. Tied 24–24. Drive: 12 plays, 75 yards, 6:56.

Fourth quarter

- JVST – Garrison Rippa 26-yard field goal, 0:44. Jacksonville State 27–24. Drive: 13 plays, 82 yards, 4:33.

Statistics	FIU	JVST
First downs	21	19
Plays–yards	76–404	57–387
Rushes–yards	32–124	32–173
Passing yards	280	214
Passing: comp–att–int	25–41–0	16–22–1
Turnovers	0	1
Time of possession	33:44	26:16

Team	Category	Player	Statistics
FIU	Passing	J. J. Kohl	24/38, 278 yards, 2 TD
FIU	Rushing	Devonte Lyons	15 carries, 73 yards, TD
FIU	Receiving	Maguire Anderson	8 receptions, 133 yards, 2 TD
Jacksonville State	Passing	Caden Creel	16/22, 214 yards, 2 TD, INT
Jacksonville State	Rushing	Caden Creel	19 carries, 95 yards
Jacksonville State	Receiving	Deondre Johnson	4 receptions, 93 yards, TD

=== at New Mexico State ===
Jacksonville State Gamecocks (5–2) at New Mexico State Aggies (3–4) – Game summary

Quarter	1	2	3	4	Total
Gamecocks	0	7	10	7	24
Aggies	0	0	0	0	0

at Aggie Memorial Stadium • Las Cruces, New Mexico

- Date: October 28
- Game time: 7:00 p.m.
- Game weather: Sunny • Temperature: 79 °F (26 °C)
- Game attendance: 6,511
- Referee: Jeremee Tate
- TV announcers (ESPN2): Clay Matvick (play-by-play) and Rocky Boiman (analyst)

Game information

First quarter

- No scoring plays.

Second quarter

- JVST – Caden Creel 3-yard run (Garrison Rippa kick), 12:33. Jacksonville State 7–0. Drive: 12 plays, 80 yards, 7:06.

Third quarter

- JVST – Garrison Rippa 49-yard field goal, 10:08. Jacksonville State 10–0. Drive: 7 plays, 23 yards, 3:36.
- JVST – Jalen Likely 1-yard run (Garrison Rippa kick), 2:31. Jacksonville State 17–0. Drive: 2 plays, 85 yards, 0:15.

Fourth quarter

- JVST – Luke Gilbert 29-yard pass from Caden Creel (Carter Lewis kick), 4:48. Jacksonville State 24–0. Drive: 12 plays, 87 yards, 7:59.

Statistics	JVST	NMSU
First downs	23	11
Plays–yards	64–433	54–221
Rushes–yards	46–324	34–192
Passing yards	109	29
Passing: comp–att–int	11–17–2	6–19–1
Turnovers	2	1
Time of possession	35:18	24:42

Team	Category	Player	Statistics
Jacksonville State	Passing	Caden Creel	11/17, 109 yards, TD, 2 INT
Jacksonville State	Rushing	Caden Creel	21 carries, 211 yards, TD
Jacksonville State	Receiving	Luke Gilbert	5 receptions, 67 yards, TD
New Mexico State	Passing	Adam Damante	6/19, 29 yards, INT
New Mexico State	Rushing	James Jones	20 carries, 112 yards
New Mexico State	Receiving	Brodie Malone-Bradford	3 receptions, 19 yards

=== Sam Houston ===
Sam Houston Bearkats (1–7) at Jacksonville State Gamecocks (6–2) – Game summary

Quarter	1	2	3	4	Total
Bearkats	0	0	7	7	14
Gamecocks	0	17	7	23	47

at AmFirst Stadium • Jacksonville, Alabama

- Date: November 7
- Game time: 6:00 p.m. CST
- Game weather: Sunny • Temperature: 59 °F (15 °C) • Wind: NW at 10 miles per hour (16 km/h)
- Game attendance: 20,476
- Referee: Reed Brotherton
- TV announcers (CBSSN): Alex Del Barrio (play-by-play) and Emory Hunt (analyst)

Game information

First quarter

- No scoring plays.

Second quarter

- JVST – Jamill Williams 31-yard pass from Caden Creel (Garrison Rippa kick), 8:35. Jacksonville State 7–0. Drive: 3 plays, 63 yards, 1:36.
- JVST – Garrison Rippa 45-yard field goal, 3:18. Jacksonville State 10–0. Drive: 7 plays, 29 yards, 3:06.
- JVST – Jalen Likely 8-yard run (Garrison Rippa kick), 0:25. Jacksonville State 17–0. Drive: 4 plays, 54 yards, 1:17.

Third quarter

- JVST – Deondre Johnson 67-yard pass from Caden Creel (Garrison Rippa kick), 14:20. Jacksonville State 24–0. Drive: 2 plays, 67 yards, 0:40.
- SHSU – Chris Reed 64-yard pass from Landyn Locke (Sam Carpenter kick), 13:43. Jacksonville State 24–7. Drive: 2 plays, 75 yards, 0:37.

Fourth quarter

- JVST – Caden Creel 4-yard run (Garrison Rippa kick), 14:10. Jacksonville State 31–7. Drive: 9 plays, 75 yards, 4:03.
- JVST – Landyn Locke sacked in the end zone by Jacob Cruz for a safety, 12:20. Jacksonville State 33–7.
- JVST – Jamill Williams 85-yard kickoff return (Garrison Rippa kick), 12:09. Jacksonville State 40–7. Drive: 1 play, 85 yards, 0:00.
- SHSU – Grady O'Neill 7-yard pass from DJ Bailey (Sam Carpenter kick), 7:21. Jacksonville State 40–14. Drive: 10 plays, 75 yards, 4:48.
- JVST – Jacob Cornejo 1-yard run (Conor Donaghy kick), 0:34. Jacksonville State 47–14. Drive: 10 plays, 75 yards, 6:46.

Statistics	SHSU	JVST
First downs	13	25
Plays–yards	51–254	64–479
Rushes–yards	23–65	33–197
Passing yards	189	282
Passing: comp–att–int	21–28–0	20–30–0
Turnovers	0	0
Time of possession	27:00	33:00

Team	Category	Player	Statistics
Sam Houston	Passing	Landyn Locke	16/21, 126 yards, TD
Sam Houston	Rushing	Landan Brown	10 carries, 50 yards
Sam Houston	Receiving	Chris Reed	6 receptions, 80 yards, TD
Jacksonville State	Passing	Caden Creel	18/28, 246 yards, 2 TD
Jacksonville State	Rushing	Caden Creel	13 carries, 87 yards, TD
Jacksonville State	Receiving	Darius Cannon	4 receptions, 74 yards

=== at Western Kentucky ===
Jacksonville State Gamecocks (7–2) at Western Kentucky Hilltoppers (3–6) – Game summary

Quarter	1	2	3	4	Total
Gamecocks	10	14	0	0	24
Hilltoppers	14	7	0	13	34

at Houchens Industries–L. T. Smith Stadium • Bowling Green, Kentucky

- Date: November 14
- Game time: 2:30 p.m.
- Game attendance: 10,112
- Referee: Rodney Burnette
- TV announcers (ESPN+): Jeff Hem (play-by-play) and Terry Obee (analyst)

Game information

First quarter

- WKU – Ajay Allen 6-yard run (Karl Campbell kick), 10:19. Western Kentucky 7–0. Drive: 7 plays, 66 yards, 2:54.
- JVST – Garrison Rippa 50-yard field goal, 7:17. Western Kentucky 7–3. Drive: 4 plays, -6 yards, 1:32.
- JVST – Jacob Cruz 8-yard fumble return (Garrison Rippa kick), 7:06. Jacksonville State 10–7. Drive: 1 play, -11 yards, 0:06.
- WKU – Brock Glenn 4-yard run (Karl Campbell kick), 0:18. Western Kentucky 14–10. Drive: 12 plays, 75 yards, 6:48.

Second quarter

- JVST – Jamill Williams 9-yard pass from Caden Creel (Garrison Rippa kick), 12:15. Jacksonville State 17–14. Drive: 6 plays, 60 yards, 3:03.
- WKU – Brock Glenn 1-yard run (Karl Campbell kick), 3:11. Western Kentucky 21–17. Drive: 16 plays, 75 yards, 9:04.
- JVST – Luke Gilbert 7-yard pass from Caden Creel (Garrison Rippa kick), 2:37. Jacksonville State 24–21. Drive: 3 plays, 78 yards, 0:30.

Third quarter

- No scoring plays.

Fourth quarter

- WKU – Jyziah Rockwell 10-yard pass from Brock Glenn (Karl Campbell kick), 0:02. Western Kentucky 28–24. Drive: 11 plays, 58 yards, 4:39.
- WKU – Dave Herard 2-yard fumble return, 0:00. Western Kentucky 34–24. Drive: 1 play, -16 yards, 0:01.

Statistics	JVST	WKU
First downs	10	24
Plays–yards	50–212	79–327
Rushes–yards	24–48	52–125
Passing yards	162	202
Passing: comp–att–int	17–25–1	21–26–1
Turnovers	3	3
Time of possession	22:26	37:34

Team	Category	Player	Statistics
Jacksonville State	Passing	Caden Creel	17/25, 164 yards, 2 TD, INT
Jacksonville State	Rushing	Jalen Likely	7 carries, 24 yards
Jacksonville State	Receiving	Luke Gilbert	5 receptions, 55 yards, TD
Western Kentucky	Passing	Rodney Tisdale Jr.	14/16, 120 yards, INT
Western Kentucky	Rushing	Brock Glenn	13 carries, 71 yards, 2 TD
Western Kentucky	Receiving	Zion Taylor	6 receptions, 52 yards

=== Missouri State ===
Missouri State Bears (4–6) at Jacksonville State Gamecocks (7–3) – Game summary

Quarter	1	2	3	4	Total
Bears	3	10	7	0	20
Gamecocks	0	3	0	22	25

at AmFirst Stadium • Jacksonville, Alabama

- Date: November 21
- Game time: 1:00 p.m.
- Game attendance: 16,307
- Referee: Stuart Mullins
- TV announcers (ESPN+): Eli Gold (play-by-play), Jeff Burger (analyst) and Erica Schoeman (sideline)

Game information

First quarter

- MOST – Yousef Obeid 35-yard field goal, 5:47. Missouri State 3–0. Drive: 13 plays, 63 yards, 6:04.

Second quarter

- JVST – Garrison Rippa 33-yard field goal, 14:55. Tied 3–3. Drive: 11 plays, 60 yards, 5:52.
- MOST – Connor Lair 79-yard run (Yousef Obeid kick), 8:50. Missouri State 10–3. Drive: 2 plays, 85 yards, 0:30.
- MOST – Yousef Obeid 47-yard field goal, 2:51. Missouri State 13–3. Drive: 6 plays, 14 yards, 2:46.

Third quarter

- MOST – Isaiah Myers 14-yard pass from Henry Belin IV (Yousef Obeid kick), 9:26. Missouri State 20–3. Drive: 14 plays, 75 yards, 5:34.

Fourth quarter

- JVST – Deondre Johnson 59-yard pass from Caden Creel (Caden Creel pass to Ronnel Johnson for two-point conversion), 12:41. Missouri State 20–11. Drive: 4 plays, 97 yards, 1:29.
- JVST – Caden Creel 22-yard run (Garrison Rippa kick), 9:58. Missouri State 20–18. Drive: 3 plays, 50 yards, 1:04.
- JVST – Khristian Lando 21-yard pass from Caden Creel (Garrison Rippa kick), 5:39. Jacksonville State 25–20. Drive: 6 plays, 59 yards, 2:09.

Statistics	MOST	JVST
First downs	19	19
Plays–yards	72–335	62–417
Rushes–yards	40–174	29–151
Passing yards	161	266
Passing: comp–att–int	20–30–0	24–32–0
Turnovers	0	1
Time of possession	32:03	27:57

Team	Category	Player	Statistics
Missouri State	Passing	Henry Belin IV	20/29, 161 yards, TD
Missouri State	Rushing	Connor Lair	12 carries, 109 yards, TD
Missouri State	Receiving	Jmariyae Robinson	6 receptions, 59 yards
Jacksonville State	Passing	Caden Creel	24/32, 266 yards, 2 TD
Jacksonville State	Rushing	Caden Creel	11 carries, 75 yards, TD
Jacksonville State	Receiving	Luke Gilbert	8 receptions, 50 yards

=== at Delaware ===
Jacksonville State Gamecocks (8–3) at Delaware Fightin' Blue Hens (6–5) – Game summary

Quarter	1	2	3	4	Total
Gamecocks	0	0	0	0	0
Fightin' Blue Hens	0	0	0	0	0

at Delaware Stadium • Newark, Delaware

- Date: November 28
- Game time: 2:30 p.m.

Game information

First quarter
Second quarter
Third quarter
Fourth quarter

Statistics	JVST	DEL
First downs		
Plays–yards		
Rushes–yards		
Passing yards		
Passing: comp–att–int		
Turnovers		
Time of possession		

Team	Category	Player	Statistics
Jacksonville State	Passing		
Jacksonville State	Rushing		
Jacksonville State	Receiving		
Delaware	Passing		
Delaware	Rushing		
Delaware	Receiving		

=== at Liberty (Conference USA Championship Game) ===
2026 Conference USA Championship Game
Jacksonville State Gamecocks (0–0) at Liberty Flames (0–0) – Game summary

Quarter	1	2	3	4	Total
Gamecocks	0	0	0	0	0
Flames	0	0	0	0	0

at Williams Stadium • Lynchburg, Virginia

- Date: December 4

Game information

First quarter
Second quarter
Third quarter
Fourth quarter

Statistics	JVST	LIB
First downs		
Plays–yards		
Rushes–yards		
Passing yards		
Passing: comp–att–int		
Turnovers		
Time of possession		

Team	Category	Player	Statistics
Jacksonville State	Passing		
Jacksonville State	Rushing		
Jacksonville State	Receiving		
Liberty	Passing		
Liberty	Rushing		
Liberty	Receiving		

== Personnel ==
=== Coaching staff ===
Name	Position	Consecutive season in current position
Charles Kelly	Head coach	2nd
Taylor Housewright	Offensive coordinator/Quarterbacks coach	1st
Brian Williams	Defensive coordinator/Safeties coach	2nd
Max Thurmond	Special teams coordinator/Running backs coach	2nd
Sam Mix	Tight ends coach	1st
Lawrence Dawsey	Wide receivers coach	2nd
Adam Ross	Offensive line coach	1st
Xavier Garcia	Defensive line coach	2nd
Deshaun Davis	Inside linebackers coach	2nd
Bert Biffani	Outside linebackers coach	2nd
Rohan Gaines	Defensive backs coach	2nd
