= 2026 Kennesaw State Owls football team =

American college football season

2026 Kennesaw State Owls football
- Conference: Conference USA
- Record: 5–6 (4–3 CUSA)
- Head coach: Jerry Mack (2nd season)
- Offensive coordinator: Mitch Militello (2nd season)
- Offensive scheme: Veer and shoot
- Defensive coordinator: Marc Mattioli (2nd season)
- Base defense: Multiple 4–2–5
- Home stadium: Fifth Third Stadium

2026 Conference USA football standings
	Conf.			Overall
Team	W		L	W		L
Liberty y	7	–	0	9	–	1
Jacksonville State y	6	–	1	8	–	3
Kennesaw State	4	–	3	5	–	6
Middle Tennessee	4	–	3	6	–	5
Delaware	4	–	3	6	–	5
Western Kentucky	3	–	4	4	–	7
Missouri State	3	–	4	4	–	7
FIU	2	–	5	4	–	7
New Mexico State	2	–	5	3	–	8
Sam Houston	0	–	7	1	–	10
Championship: Jacksonville State at Liberty
y – Championship game participant; As of November 22, 2026; Rankings from AP poll

The 2026 Kennesaw State Owls football team represents Kennesaw State University in Conference USA (CUSA) during the 2026 NCAA Division I FBS football season. Led by second-year head coach Jerry Mack, the Owls play their home games at Fifth Third Stadium in Cobb County, Georgia which is near Kennesaw.

== Schedule ==
Date	Time	Opponent	Site	TV	Result	Attendance
September 3	7:00 p.m.	West Georgia*	Fifth Third Stadium; Kennesaw, GA	ESPN+	W 47–0	11,040
September 12	7:00 p.m.	Georgia State*	Fifth Third Stadium; Kennesaw, GA	ESPN+	L 17–31	11,040
September 19	7:45 p.m.	at No. 15 Tennessee*	Neyland Stadium; Knoxville, TN	SECN	L 9–42	101,915
September 26	7:00 p.m.	at Arkansas State*	Centennial Bank Stadium; Jonesboro, AR	ESPN Networks	L 14–17	19,087
October 7	7:00 p.m.	Jacksonville State	Fifth Third Stadium; Kennesaw, GA (rivalry)	CBSSN	L 26–27	10,225
October 14	7:30 p.m.	at Missouri State	Robert W. Plaster Stadium; Springfield, MO	CBSSN	L 21–24	9,044
October 22	7:00 p.m.	Liberty	Fifth Third Stadium; Kennesaw, GA	CBSSN	L 6–34	8,159
October 28	7:00 p.m.	at Middle Tennessee	Johnny "Red" Floyd Stadium; Murfreesboro, TN	CBSSN	W 44–28	10,005
November 7	3:00 p.m.	Delaware^{†}	Fifth Third Stadium; Kennesaw, GA	ESPN+	W 42–40	10,300
November 14	2:00 p.m.	at Sam Houston	Bowers Stadium; Huntsville, TX	ESPN+	W 26–7	11,574
November 21	3:00 p.m.	FIU	Fifth Third Stadium; Kennesaw, GA	ESPN+	W 35–26	6,672
November 28	1:00 p.m.	at Western Kentucky	Houchens Industries–L. T. Smith Stadium; Bowling Green, KY	ESPN+		
*Non-conference game; ^{†}Homecoming; Rankings from AP Poll - Released prior to game; All times are in Eastern time

== Game summaries ==
All game times in Eastern time

=== West Georgia (FCS) ===
Game One – West Georgia Wolves (FCS) (0–1) at Kennesaw State Owls (0–0) – Game summary

Quarter	1	2	3	4	Total
Wolves (FCS)	0	0	0	0	0
Owls	19	21	7	0	47

at Fifth Third Stadium • Kennesaw, GA

- Date: September 3
- Game time: 7:00 p.m.
- Game weather: Clear • Temperature: 84 °F (29 °C) • Wind: SW at 5 mph
- Game attendance: 11,040
- Referee: Jeremee Tate
- TV announcers (ESPN+): Nolan Alexander, Caleb O'Neal, Matthew Downing and Lexi Bowden

Game information

First quarter

- KENN – Latrelle Murrell 45-yard run (Daniel Kinney PAT failed), 13:16. Owls 6–0. Drive: 5 plays, 53 yards, 1:36.
- KENN – Triston Morgan 60-yard run (pass failed), 2:07. Owls 12–0. Drive: 1 play, 60 yards, 0:31.
- KENN – Rickie Collins 3-yard run (Daniel Kinney kick), 1:16. Owls 19–0. Drive: 2 plays, 14 yards, 0:44.

Second quarter

- KENN – Latrelle Murrell 17-yard run (Daniel Kinney kick), 6:18. Owls 26–0. Drive: 4 plays, 62 yards, 1:21.
- KENN – Rickie Collins 24-yard run (Daniel Kinney kick), 3:22. Owls 33–0. Drive: 6 plays, 61 yards, 1:15.
- KENN – Boogie Woods III 1-yard run (Daniel Kinney kick), 1:26. Owls 40–0. Drive: 6 plays, 31 yards, 1:48.

Third quarter

- KENN – Dylan Gary 9-yard pass from Rickie Collins (Daniel Kinney kick), 9:19. Owls 47–0. Drive: 8 plays, 73 yards, 3:08.

Fourth quarter

- No scoring plays.

Statistics	UWG	KENN
First downs	7	30
Plays–yards	51–160	81–508
Rushes–yards	25–49	47–297
Passing yards	111	211
Passing: Comp–Att–Int	15–26–0	26–34–1
Turnovers	2	2
Time of possession	25:54	34:06

Team	Category	Player	Statistics
West Georgia	Passing	Collin Hurst	9/15, 93 yards
West Georgia	Rushing	Luke Marble	5 carries, 21 yards
West Georgia	Receiving	Malik Leverett	2 receptions, 28 yards
Kennesaw State	Passing	Rickie Collins	18/23, 156 yards, TD
Kennesaw State	Rushing	Latrelle Murrell	9 carries, 88 yards, 2 TD
Kennesaw State	Receiving	Javon Rogers	2 receptions, 55 yards

=== Georgia State ===
Game Two – Georgia State Panthers (1–0) at Kennesaw State Owls (1–0) – Game summary

Quarter	1	2	3	4	Total
Panthers	6	15	7	3	31
Owls	3	0	8	6	17

at Fifth Third Stadium • Kennesaw, Georgia

- Date: September 12
- Game time: 7:00 p.m.
- Game weather: Sunny • Temperature: 95 °F (35 °C) • Wind: NE at 5 mph
- Game attendance: 11,040
- Referee: Brandon Kirkland
- TV announcers (ESPN+): Nolan Alexander (play-by-play), Caleb O'Neal (analyst) and Maria Martin (sideline reporter)

Game information

First quarter

- GAST – Samer Layous 41-yard field goal, 9:18. Panthers 3–0. Drive: 11 plays, 52 yards, 5:42.
- KENN – Daniel Kinney 29-yard field goal, 6:28. Tied 3–3. Drive: 6 plays, 64 yards, 2:43.
- GAST – Samer Layous 27-yard field goal, 1:28. Panthers 6–3. Drive: 12 plays, 66 yards, 5:00.

Second quarter

- GAST – Cameran Brown 18-yard run (Wesley Campbell IV–Ayden Pereira two-point pass), 12:02. Panthers 14–3. Drive: 4 plays, 43 yards, 2:49.
- GAST – Lanear McCrary Jr. 1-yard run (Samer Layous kick), 0:40. Panthers 21–3. Drive: 8 plays, 80 yards, 3:58.

Third quarter

- GAST – Dennis Murray Jr. 12-yard run (Samer Layous kick), 4:42. Panthers 28–3. Drive: 9 plays, 93 yards, 5:05.
- KENN – Rickie Collins 12-yard run (Brayden Munroe–Rickie Collins two-point pass), 0:53. Panthers 28–11. Drive: 3 plays, 65 yards, 1:06.

Fourth quarter

- GAST – Samer Layous 43-yard field goal, 9:15. Panthers 31–11. Drive: 12 plays, 51 yards, 6:38.
- KENN – Jamari Harrold 3-yard pass from Rickie Collins (pass failed), 1:56. Panthers 31–17. Drive: 10 plays, 72 yards, 3:35.

Statistics	GAST	KENN
First downs	23	17
Plays–yards	70–483	56–332
Rushes–yards	47–230	21–72
Passing yards	253	260
Passing: Comp–Att–Int	16–23–1	22–35–1
Turnovers	2	1
Time of possession	37:47	22:13

Team	Category	Player	Statistics
Georgia State	Passing	Cameran Brown	16/23, 253 yards, INT
Georgia State	Rushing	Lanear McCrary Jr.	19 carries, 101 yards, TD
Georgia State	Receiving	Kyle Washington	2 receptions, 59 yards
Kennesaw State	Passing	Rickie Collins	22/35, 260 yards, TD, INT
Kennesaw State	Rushing	Rickie Collins	10 carries, 46 yards, TD
Kennesaw State	Receiving	Javon Rogers	3 receptions, 74 yards

=== at No. 15 Tennessee ===
Game Three – Kennesaw State Owls (1–1) at No. 15 Tennessee Volunteers (2–0) – Game summary

Quarter	1	2	3	4	Total
Owls	3	0	0	6	9
No. 15 Volunteers	15	6	14	7	42

at Neyland Stadium • Knoxville, Tennessee

- Date: September 19
- Game time: 7:45 p.m.
- Game weather: Clear • Temperature: 87 °F (31 °C) • Wind: S 2 mph
- Game attendance: 101,915
- Referee: Ted Pitts
- TV announcers (SECN): Dave Neal, Cole Cubelic and Ashley Stroehlein

Statistics	KENN	TENN
First downs	18	26
Plays–yards	64–291	67–446
Rushes–yards	30–102	41–268
Passing yards	189	178
Passing: comp–att–int	22–34–0	18–26–0
Time of possession	30:57	29:03

Team	Category	Player	Statistics
Kennesaw State	Passing	Rickie Collins	22/34, 189 yards
Kennesaw State	Rushing	Rickie Collins	14 carries, 55 yards
Kennesaw State	Receiving	Zion Booker	10 receptions, 78 yards
Tennessee	Passing	Faizon Brandon	18/26, 178 yards, TD
Tennessee	Rushing	Daune Morris	14 carries, 116 yards, TD
Tennessee	Receiving	Braylon Staley	4 receptions, 59 yards, TD

=== at Arkansas State ===
Game Four – Kennesaw State Owls (1–2) at Arkansas State Red Wolves (1–2) – Game summary

Quarter	1	2	3	4	Total
Owls	0	0	0	0	0
Red Wolves	0	0	0	0	0

at Centennial Bank Stadium • Jonesboro, AR

- Date: September 26
- Game time: 7:00 p.m.
- TV announcers (ESPN+): Graham Doty and Pete Cordelli

Game information

First quarter
Second quarter
Third quarter
Fourth quarter

Statistics	KENN	ARST
First downs		
Plays–yards		
Rushes–yards		
Passing yards		
Passing: Comp–Att–Int		
Turnovers		
Time of possession		

Team	Category	Player	Statistics
Kennesaw State	Passing		
Kennesaw State	Rushing		
Kennesaw State	Receiving		
Arkansas State	Passing		
Arkansas State	Rushing		
Arkansas State	Receiving		

=== Jacksonville State (rivalry) ===
Game Five – Jacksonville State Gamecocks (3–2) at Kennesaw State Owls (1–3) – Game summary

Quarter	1	2	3	4	Total
Gamecocks	0	14	7	6	27
Owls	3	13	7	3	26

at Fifth Third Stadium • Kennesaw, GA

- Date: October 7
- Game time: 7:00 p.m.
- Game weather: Sunny • Temperature: 73 °F (23 °C) • Wind: SE at 4 miles per hour (6.4 km/h)
- Game attendance: 10,225
- Referee: Stuart Mullins
- TV announcers (CBSSN): Chris Lewis (play-by-play) and Taylor McHargue (analyst)

Game information

First quarter

- KENN – Daniel Kinney 20-yard field goal, 6:44. Kennesaw State 3–0. Drive: 15 plays, 73 yards, 8:16.

Second quarter

- JVST – Jamill Williams 1-yard pass from Caden Creel (Garrison Rippa kick), 14:37. Jacksonville State 7–3. Drive: 14 plays, 75 yards, 7:07.
- KENN – Rickie Collins 2-yard run (Daniel Kinney kick missed), 12:19. Kennesaw State 9–7. Drive: 4 plays, 75 yards, 2:18.
- JVST – Caden Creel 2-yard run (Garrison Rippa kick), 4:30. Jacksonville State 14–9. Drive: 4 plays, 71 yards, 2:18.
- KENN – Javon Rogers 5-yard pass from Rickie Collins (Daniel Kinney kick), 0:23. Kennesaw State 16–14. Drive: 7 plays, 53 yards, 0:53.

Third quarter

- KENN – Latrelle Murrell 4-yard run (Daniel Kinney kick), 1:30. Kennesaw State 23–14. Drive: 8 plays, 74 yards, 3:27.
- JVST – Jalen Likely 3-yard run (Garrison Rippa kick), 0:26. Kennesaw State 23–21. Drive: 4 plays, 75 yards, 1:02.

Fourth quarter

- JVST – Garrison Rippa 20-yard field goal, 9:23. Jacksonville State 24–23. Drive: 13 plays, 75 yards, 4:39.
- KENN – Daniel Kinney 28-yard field goal, 2:15. Kennesaw State 26–24. Drive: 9 plays, 50 yards, 4:03.
- JVST – Garrison Rippa 33-yard field goal, 0:52. Jacksonville State 27–26. Drive: 11 plays, 60 yards, 1:23.

Statistics	JVST	KENN
First downs	27	22
Plays–yards	76–385	67–410
Rushes–yards	30–74	30–117
Passing yards	311	293
Passing: Comp–Att–Int	26–44–1	24–35–2
Turnovers	2	2
Time of possession	29:02	30:58

Team	Category	Player	Statistics
Jacksonville State	Passing	Caden Creel	26/44, 311 yards, TD, INT
Jacksonville State	Rushing	Jalen Likely	11 carries, 40 yards, TD
Jacksonville State	Receiving	Deondre Johnson	4 receptions, 112 yards
Kennesaw State	Passing	Rickie Collins	24/34, 293 yards, TD, 2 INT
Kennesaw State	Rushing	Rickie Collins	15 carries, 61 yards, TD
Kennesaw State	Receiving	Brayden Munroe	7 receptions, 159 yards

=== at Missouri State ===
Game Six – Kennesaw State Owls (1–4) at Missouri State Bears (1–4) – Game summary

Quarter	1	2	3	4	Total
Owls	0	0	0	0	0
Bears	0	0	0	0	0

at Robert W. Plaster Stadium • Springfield, MO

- Date: October 14
- Game time: 7:30 p.m.
- TV: CBSSN

Game information

First quarter
Second quarter
Third quarter
Fourth quarter

Statistics	KENN	MOST
First downs		
Plays–yards		
Rushes–yards		
Passing yards		
Passing: Comp–Att–Int		
Turnovers		
Time of possession		

Team	Category	Player	Statistics
Kennesaw State	Passing		
Kennesaw State	Rushing		
Kennesaw State	Receiving		
Missouri State	Passing		
Missouri State	Rushing		
Missouri State	Receiving		

=== Liberty ===
Game Seven – Liberty Flames (5–1) at Kennesaw State Owls (1–5) – Game summary

Quarter	1	2	3	4	Total
Flames	0	0	0	0	0
Owls	0	0	0	0	0

at Fifth Third Stadium • Kennesaw, GA

- Date: October 22
- Game time: 7:00 p.m.
- TV: CBSSN

Game information

First quarter
Second quarter
Third quarter
Fourth quarter

Statistics	LIB	KENN
First downs		
Plays–yards		
Rushes–yards		
Passing yards		
Passing: Comp–Att–Int		
Turnovers		
Time of possession		

Team	Category	Player	Statistics
Liberty	Passing		
Liberty	Rushing		
Liberty	Receiving		
Kennesaw State	Passing		
Kennesaw State	Rushing		
Kennesaw State	Receiving		

=== at Middle Tennessee ===
Game Eight – Kennesaw State Owls (1–6) at Middle Tennessee Blue Raiders (4–3) – Game summary

Quarter	1	2	3	4	Total
Owls	0	0	0	0	0
Blue Raiders	0	0	0	0	0

at Johnny "Red" Floyd Stadium • Murfreesboro, TN

- Date: October 28
- Game time: 7:00 p.m.
- TV: CBSSN

Game information

First quarter
Second quarter
Third quarter
Fourth quarter

Statistics	KENN	MTSU
First downs		
Plays–yards		
Rushes–yards		
Passing yards		
Passing: Comp–Att–Int		
Turnovers		
Time of possession		

Team	Category	Player	Statistics
Kennesaw State	Passing		
Kennesaw State	Rushing		
Kennesaw State	Receiving		
Middle Tennessee	Passing		
Middle Tennessee	Rushing		
Middle Tennessee	Receiving		

=== Delaware ===
Game Nine – Delaware Fightin' Blue Hens (4–4) at Kennesaw State Owls (2–6) – Game summary

Quarter	1	2	3	4	Total
Fightin' Blue Hens	0	0	0	0	0
Owls	0	0	0	0	0

at Fifth Third Stadium • Kennesaw, GA

- Date: November 7
- Game time: 3:00 p.m.
- TV: ESPN Networks

Game information

First quarter
Second quarter
Third quarter
Fourth quarter

Statistics	DEL	KENN
First downs		
Plays–yards		
Rushes–yards		
Passing yards		
Passing: Comp–Att–Int		
Turnovers		
Time of possession		

Team	Category	Player	Statistics
Delaware	Passing		
Delaware	Rushing		
Delaware	Receiving		
Kennesaw State	Passing		
Kennesaw State	Rushing		
Kennesaw State	Receiving		

=== at Sam Houston ===
Game Ten – Kennesaw State Owls (3–6) at Sam Houston Bearkats (1–8) – Game summary

Quarter	1	2	3	4	Total
Owls	0	0	0	0	0
Bearkats	0	0	0	0	0

at Bowers Stadium • Huntsville, TX

- Date: November 14
- Game time: 2:00 p.m.
- TV: ESPN Networks

Game information

First quarter
Second quarter
Third quarter
Fourth quarter

Statistics	KENN	SHSU
First downs		
Plays–yards		
Rushes–yards		
Passing yards		
Passing: Comp–Att–Int		
Turnovers		
Time of possession		

Team	Category	Player	Statistics
Kennesaw State	Passing		
Kennesaw State	Rushing		
Kennesaw State	Receiving		
Sam Houston	Passing		
Sam Houston	Rushing		
Sam Houston	Receiving		

=== FIU ===
Game Eleven – FIU Panthers (4–6) at Kennesaw State Owls (4–6) – Game summary

Quarter	1	2	3	4	Total
Panthers	0	0	0	0	0
Owls	0	0	0	0	0

at Fifth Third Stadium • Kennesaw, GA

- Date: November 21
- Game time: 3:00 p.m.
- TV: ESPN Networks

Game information

First quarter
Second quarter
Third quarter
Fourth quarter

Statistics	FIU	KENN
First downs		
Plays–yards		
Rushes–yards		
Passing yards		
Passing: Comp–Att–Int		
Turnovers		
Time of possession		

Team	Category	Player	Statistics
FIU	Passing		
FIU	Rushing		
FIU	Receiving		
Kennesaw State	Passing		
Kennesaw State	Rushing		
Kennesaw State	Receiving		

=== at Western Kentucky ===
Game Twelve – Kennesaw State Owls (0–0) at Western Kentucky Hilltoppers (0–0) – Game summary

Quarter	1	2	3	4	Total
Owls	0	0	0	0	0
Hilltoppers	0	0	0	0	0

at Houchens Industries–L. T. Smith Stadium • Bowling Green, KY

- Date: November 28
- Game time: 1:00 p.m.
- TV: ESPN Networks

Game information

First quarter
Second quarter
Third quarter
Fourth quarter

Statistics	KENN	WKU
First downs		
Plays–yards		
Rushes–yards		
Passing yards		
Passing: Comp–Att–Int		
Turnovers		
Time of possession		

Team	Category	Player	Statistics
Kennesaw State	Passing		
Kennesaw State	Rushing		
Kennesaw State	Receiving		
Western Kentucky	Passing		
Western Kentucky	Rushing		
Western Kentucky	Receiving		
