= 2026 Eastern Kentucky Colonels football team =

American college football season

2026 Eastern Kentucky Colonels football
- Conference: United Athletic Conference
- Record: 4–8 (3–4 UAC)
- Head coach: Walt Wells (7th season)
- Offensive coordinator: Andy Richman (7th season)
- Defensive coordinator: Jake Johnson (7th season)
- Home stadium: Roy Kidd Stadium

2026 United Athletic Conference standings
	Conf.			Overall
Team	W		L	W		L
No. 1 Tarleton State $^	7	–	0	12	–	0
No. 19 Abilene Christian	5	–	2	6	–	6
No. 14 Austin Peay	4	–	3	8	–	4
North Alabama	4	–	3	7	–	5
Central Arkansas	3	–	4	5	–	7
Eastern Kentucky	3	–	4	4	–	8
West Florida*	2	–	5	5	–	5
West Georgia*	0	–	7	1	–	11
^ – FCS playoff participant; * – Ineligible for UAC title and FCS postseason play due to transition from NCAA Division II.; As of November 22, 2026; Rankings from STATS Poll

The 2026 Eastern Kentucky Colonels football team will represent Eastern Kentucky University as a member of the United Athletic Conference (UAC) during the 2026 NCAA Division I FCS football season. The Colonels will be led by seventh-year head coach Walt Wells and will play their home games at Roy Kidd Stadium in Richmond, Kentucky.

== Schedule ==
Date	Time	Opponent	Site	TV	Result	Attendance
August 29	7:00 p.m.	at Western Carolina*	E. J. Whitmire Stadium; Cullowhee, NC	ESPN+	L 21–45	13,482
September 5	7:00 p.m.	at Jacksonville State*	AmFirst Stadium; Jacksonville, AL	ESPN+	L 7–49	19,677
September 12	6:00 p.m.	Chattanooga*	Roy Kidd Stadium; Richmond, KY	ESPN+	W 22–17	4,588
September 19	6:00 p.m.	Dayton*	Roy Kidd Stadium; Richmond, KY	ESPN+	L 14–17	4,606
October 3	6:00 p.m.	North Alabama	Roy Kidd Stadium; Richmond, KY	ESPN+	L 16–20	6,512
October 10	6:00 p.m.	West Georgia	Roy Kidd Stadium; Richmond, KY	ESPN+	W 30–20	3,205
October 17	2:30 p.m.	at No. 15 Tennessee Tech*	Tucker Stadium; Cookeville, TN	ESPN+	L 20–49	
October 24	3:00 p.m.	West Florida^{†}	Roy Kidd Stadium; Richmond, KY	ESPN+	W 16–13	6,281
October 31	7:00 p.m.	at No. 1 Tarleton State	Memorial Stadium; Stephenville, TX	ESPN+	L 24–28	15,876
November 7	5:00 p.m.	at No. 7 Austin Peay	Fortera Stadium; Clarksville, TN	ESPN+	L 31–55	7,524
November 14	2:00 p.m.	Central Arkansas	Roy Kidd Stadium; Richmond, KY	ESPN+	L 35–38	6,281
November 21	2:00 p.m.	at No. 19 Abilene Christian	Wildcat Stadium; Abilene, TX	ESPN+	W 44–25	7,666
*Non-conference game; ^{†}Homecoming; Rankings from STATS Poll released prior to the game; All times are in Eastern time

== Game summaries ==
=== at Western Carolina ===
Eastern Kentucky Colonels (0–0) at Western Carolina Catamounts (0–0) – Game summary

Quarter	1	2	3	4	Total
Colonels	7	7	7	0	21
Catamounts	7	3	21	14	45

at E. J. Whitmire Stadium • Cullowhee, North Carolina

- Date: August 29
- Game time: 7:00 p.m.
- Game weather: Sunny • Temperature: 74 °F (23 °C) • Wind: SE at 3 miles per hour (4.8 km/h)
- Game attendance: 13,482
- Referee: Jake Grombach
- TV announcers (ESPN+): Daniel Hooker and John Brannon III

Game information

First quarter

- EKU – Elijah Caldwell 18-yard pass from Tyler Travers (Buzz Flabiano kick), 9:38. Colonels 7–0. Drive: 10 plays, 75 yards, 5:22.
- WCU – Marlin Cochran 34-yard run (Bryan McCollum kick), 0:15. Tied 7–7. Drive: 7 plays, 89 yards, 3:08.

Second quarter

- EKU – Brayden Latham 9-yard pass from Tyler Travers (Buzz Flabiano kick), 1:57. Colonels 14–7. Drive: 12 plays, 81 yards, 6:28.
- WCU – Bryan McCollum 20-yard field goal, 0:00. Colonels 14–10. Drive: 8 plays, 39 yards, 1:48.

Third quarter

- WCU – Bode Burns 18-yard pass from Lex Thomas (Bryan McCollum kick), 12:47. Catamounts 17–14. Drive: 6 plays, 75 yards, 2:13.
- WCU – Josh Perry 12-yard pass from Lex Thomas (Bryan McCollum kick), 8:31. Catamounts 24–14. Drive: 6 plays, 60 yards, 2:50.
- WCU – Josh Perry 6-yard pass from Lex Thomas (Bryan McCollum kick), 3:38. Catamounts 31–14. Drive: 7 plays, 50 yards, 2:27.
- EKU – Jarvis Hayes 15-yard pass from Tyler Travers (Buzz Flabiano kick), 0:37. Catamounts 31–21. Drive: 7 plays, 75 yards, 3:01.

Fourth quarter

- WCU – Lex Thomas 15-yard run (Bryan McCollum kick), 2:27. Catamounts 38–21. Drive: 5 plays, 53 yards, 0:56.
- WCU – Anthony Benjamin 14-yard run (Bryan McCollum kick), 0:47. Catamounts 45–21. Drive: 3 plays, 26 yards, 0:49.

Statistics	EKU	WCU
First downs	20	28
Plays–yards	63–370	75–508
Rushes–yards	29–65	40–188
Passing yards	305	320
Passing: comp–att–int	22–34–1	27–35–0
Turnovers	2	0
Time of possession	27:45	32:15

Team	Category	Player	Statistics
Eastern Kentucky	Passing	Tyler Travers	22/34, 305 yards, 3 TD, INT
Eastern Kentucky	Rushing	Brayden Latham	16 carries, 41 yards
Eastern Kentucky	Receiving	Elijah Caldwell	6 receptions, 102 yards, TD
Western Carolina	Passing	Lex Thomas	27/35, 320 yards, 3 TD
Western Carolina	Rushing	Lex Thomas	14 carries, 69 yards, TD
Western Carolina	Receiving	Michael Rossin	6 receptions, 94 yards

=== at Jacksonville State (FBS) ===
Eastern Kentucky Colonels (0–1) at Jacksonville State Gamecocks (FBS) (0–1) – Game summary

Quarter	1	2	3	4	Total
Colonels	0	7	0	0	7
Gamecocks (FBS)	14	21	7	7	49

at AmFirst Stadium • Jacksonville, Alabama

- Date: September 5
- Game time: 6:00 p.m.
- Game weather: Sunny • Temperature: 96 °F (36 °C) • Wind: 0 mph
- Game attendance: 19,677
- Referee: Stuart Mullins
- TV announcers (ESPN+): Eli Gold, Jeff Burger and Erica Schoeman

Game information

First quarter

- JVST – Jamill Williams 13-yard pass from Caden Creel (Garrison Rippa kick), 6:27. Jacksonville State 7–0. Drive: 13 plays, 70 yards, 4:35.
- JVST – Jamill Williams 55-yard pass from Caden Creel (Garrison Rippa kick), 4:25. Jacksonville State 14–0. Drive: 2 plays, 74 yards, 0:43.

Second quarter

- JVST – Jamill Williams 30-yard pass from Caden Creel (Garrison Rippa kick), 12:24. Jacksonville State 21–0. Drive: 8 plays, 91 yards, 2:47.
- JVST – Caleb Nix 43-yard interception return (Garrison Rippa kick), 10:27. Jacksonville State 28–0.
- EKU – Brady Hensley 72-yard run (Buzz Flabiano kick), 9:45 Jacksonville State 28–7. Drive: 2 plays, 70 yards, 0:35.
- JVST – Jalen Likely 45-yard run (Garrison Rippa kick), 5:28 Jacksonville State 35–7. Drive: 8 plays, 75 yards, 4:10.

Third quarter

- JVST – Luke Gilbert 24-yard pass from Caden Creel (Garrison Rippa kick), 6:03. Jacksonville State 42–7. Drive: 10 plays, 83 yards, 4:39.

Fourth quarter

- JVST – Jamill Williams 4-yard pass from Caden Creel (Garrison Rippa kick), 7:09 Jacksonville State 49–7. Drive: 7 plays, 59 yards, 4:17.

Statistics	EKU	JVST
First downs	16	26
Plays–yards	57–285	61–526
Rushes–yards	38–195	31–174
Passing yards	90	352
Passing: comp–att–int	12–19–2	23–30–1
Turnovers	2	1
Time of possession	33:27	26:33

Team	Category	Player	Statistics
Eastern Kentucky	Passing	Tyler Travers	12/19, 90 yards, 2 INT
Eastern Kentucky	Rushing	Brady Hensley	7 carries, 91 yards, TD
Eastern Kentucky	Receiving	Simon Ghee	2 receptions, 12 yards
Jacksonville State	Passing	Caden Creel	21/28, 327 yards, 5 TD, INT
Jacksonville State	Rushing	Jalen Likely	5 carries, 73 yards, TD
Jacksonville State	Receiving	Jamill Williams	7 receptions, 144 yards, 4 TD

=== Chattanooga ===
Chattanooga Mocs (1–1) at Eastern Kentucky Colonels (0–2) – Game summary

Quarter	1	2	3	4	Total
Mocs	0	3	14	0	17
Colonels	6	10	0	6	22

at Roy Kidd Stadium • Richmond, Kentucky

- Date: September 12
- Game time: 6:00 p.m.
- Game weather: Cloudy • Temperature: 83 °F (28 °C) • Wind: NE at 7 miles per hour (11 km/h)
- Game attendance: 4,588
- Referee: Matthew Jones
- TV announcers (ESPN+): Wes Chandler (play-by-play), Terry Johnson (analyst) and Michelle Knezovic (sideline)

Game information

First quarter

- (9:16) EKU – Braylon Newcomb 16-yard pass from Tyler Travers (Drive: 5 plays, 80 yards, 2:31; Eastern Kentucky 6–0)

Second quarter

- (10:42) UTC – Jude Kelley 31-yard field goal (Drive: 8 plays, 25 yards, 4:03; Eastern Kentucky 6–3)
- (4:52) EKU – Brady Hensley 96-yard run, Buzz Flabiano kick (Drive: 1 play, 96 yards, 0:15; Eastern Kentucky 13–3)
- (0:29) EKU – Buzz Flabiano 33-yard field goal (Drive: 8 plays, 34 yards, 3:12; Eastern Kentucky 16–3)

Third quarter

- (9:53) UTC – Kevin Lalin 27-yard run, Jude Kelley kick (Drive: 6 plays, 50 yards, 3:11; Eastern Kentucky 16–10)
- (2:41) UTC – Battle Alberson 5-yard run, Jude Kelley kick (Drive: 3 plays, 69 yards, 1:18; Chattanooga 17–16)

Fourth quarter

- (3:48) EKU – Brayden Latham 1-yard run (Drive: 9 plays, 79 yards, 4:58; Eastern Kentucky 22–17)

Statistics	UTC	EKU
First downs	13	22
Plays–yards	58–254	66–394
Rushes–yards	31–119	43–274
Passing yards	135	120
Passing: comp–att–int	12–27–1	13–23–2
Turnovers	1	2
Time of possession	26:48	33:12

Team	Category	Player	Statistics
Chattanooga	Passing	Battle Alberson	12/27, 135 yards, INT
Chattanooga	Rushing	Kevin Lalin	17 carries, 98 yards, TD
Chattanooga	Receiving	Ashton Schumann	5 receptions, 98 yards
Eastern Kentucky	Passing	Tyler Travers	13/23, 120 yards, TD, 2 INT
Eastern Kentucky	Rushing	Brady Hensley	7 carries, 119 yards, TD
Eastern Kentucky	Receiving	Brayden Latham	2 receptions, 23 yards

=== Dayton ===
Dayton Flyers (2–0) at Eastern Kentucky Colonels (1–2) – Game summary

Quarter	1	2	3	4	Total
Flyers	0	7	7	3	17
Colonels	0	0	0	14	14

at Roy Kidd Stadium • Richmond, Kentucky

- Date: September 19
- Game time: 6:00 p.m.
- Game weather: Clear • Temperature: 87 °F (31 °C) • Wind: N at 2 miles per hour (3.2 km/h)
- Game attendance: 4,606
- Referee: Branden McCain
- TV announcers (ESPN+): Wes Chandler (play-by-play) and Terry Johnson (analyst)

Game information

First quarter

No scoring plays

Second quarter

- (0:01) DAY – Michael Mussari 4-yard pass from Bryce Schondelmyer, David Maurer kick (Drive: 7 plays, 70 yards, 1:21; Dayton 7–0)

Third quarter

- (3:05) DAY – Luke Hansen 1-yard run, David Maurer kick (Drive: 5 plays, 40 yards, 1:52; Dayton 14–0)

Fourth quarter

- (14:57) EKU – Brady Hensley 2-yard run, Buzz Flabiano kick (Drive: 9 plays, 75 yards, 3:08; Dayton 14–7)
- (11:01) DAY – David Maurer 23-yard field goal (Drive: 8 plays, 69 yards, 3:56; Dayton 17–7)
- (8:18) EKU – Caeleb Schlachter 54-yard pass from Jordyn Potts, Buzz Flabiano kick (Drive: 6 plays, 75 yards, 2:43; Dayton 17–14)

Statistics	DAY	EKU
First downs	17	23
Plays–yards	65–302	69–426
Rushes–yards	34–156	32–148
Passing yards	146	278
Passing: comp–att–int	18–31–0	24–37–0
Turnovers	0	2
Time of possession	31:33	28:27

Team	Category	Player	Statistics
Dayton	Passing	Bryce Schondelmyer	18/30, 146 yards, TD
Dayton	Rushing	Luke Hansen	14 carries, 110 yards, TD
Dayton	Receiving	Michael Mussari	7 receptions, 87 yards, TD
Eastern Kentucky	Passing	Jordyn Potts	23/36, 273 yards, TD
Eastern Kentucky	Rushing	Brady Hensley	12 carries, 93 yards, TD
Eastern Kentucky	Receiving	Elijah Caldwell	6 receptions, 67 yards

=== North Alabama ===
North Alabama Lions (3–2) at Eastern Kentucky Colonels (1–3) – Game summary

Quarter	1	2	3	4	Total
Lions	3	0	14	3	20
Colonels	7	6	0	3	16

at Roy Kidd Stadium • Richmond, Kentucky

- Date: October 3
- Game time: 6:00 p.m.
- TV: ESPN+

Game information

First quarter
Second quarter
Third quarter
Fourth quarter

Statistics	UNA	EKU
First downs		
Plays–yards		
Rushes–yards		
Passing yards		
Passing: comp–att–int		
Turnovers		
Time of possession		

Team	Category	Player	Statistics
North Alabama	Passing	Destin Wade	
North Alabama	Rushing		Roderick Taylor, Jr.
North Alabama	Receiving		Snap Reed
Eastern Kentucky	Passing	Jordyn Potts	
Eastern Kentucky	Rushing		Brady Hensley
Eastern Kentucky	Receiving		Elijah Caldwell

=== West Georgia ===
West Georgia Wolves (1–4) at Eastern Kentucky Colonels (1–4) – Game summary

Quarter	1	2	3	4	Total
Wolves	7	0	6	7	20
Colonels	0	21	0	9	30

at Roy Kidd Stadium • Richmond, Kentucky

- Date: October 10
- Game time: 6:00 p.m.
- TV: ESPN+

Game information

First quarter
Second quarter
Third quarter
Fourth quarter

Statistics	UWG	EKU
First downs		
Plays–yards		
Rushes–yards		
Passing yards		
Passing: comp–att–int		
Turnovers		
Time of possession		

Team	Category	Player	Statistics
West Georgia	Passing	Colton Fitzgerald	18/33, 282 yards, 1 TD, 1 INT
West Georgia	Rushing	Shammai Gates	5 carries, 39 yards
West Georgia	Receiving	T.J. Lockley	2 receptions, 86 yards
Eastern Kentucky	Passing	Jordyn Potts	17/24, 195 yards, 1 TD
Eastern Kentucky	Rushing	Brady Hensley	29 carries, 138 yards, 1 TD
Eastern Kentucky	Receiving	Jayden West	3 receptions, 62 yards, 1 TD

=== at No. 15 Tennessee Tech ===
Eastern Kentucky Colonels (2–4) at No. 15 Tennessee Tech Golden Eagles (5–1) – Game summary

Quarter	1	2	3	4	Total
Colonels	7	0	0	13	20
No. 15 Golden Eagles	7	21	14	7	49

at Tucker Stadium • Cookeville, Tennessee

- Date: October 17
- Game time: 2:30 p.m.
- TV: ESPN+

Game information

First quarter

- TNTC - Tre' Holloway 36-yard pass from Jax Leatherwood (Carter Brown kick), 12:38. Golden Eagles 7–0. Drive: 4 plays, 56 yards, 2:10.
- EKU - Jeffrey Kinley 95-yard interception return (Devin Orr kick), 2:24. Tied 7–7. Drive: 8 plays, 62 yards, 4:41.

Second quarter

- TNTC - Qua Ashley 2-yard run (Carter Brown kick), 9:23. Golden Eagles 14–7. Drive: 7 plays, 51 yards, 3:32.
- TNTC - Jameson Wharton 21-yard interception return (Carter Brown kick), 8:39. Golden Eagles 21–7. Drive: 2 plays, -2 yards, 0:41.
- TNTC - Eric Weatherly 19-yard pass from Jax Leatherwood (Carter Brown kick), 0:22. Golden Eagles 28–7. Drive: 13 plays, 76 yards, 3:06.

Third quarter

- TNTC - M. J. Flowers 7-yard run (Carter Brown kick), 11:52. Golden Eagles 35–7. Drive: 3 plays, 34 yards, 1:30.
- TNTC - Qua Ashley 42-yard run (Carter Brown kick), 6:11. Golden Eagles 42–7. Drive: 8 plays, 65 yards, 4:48.

Fourth quarter

- TNTC - Tre' Holloway 4-yard pass from Jax Leatherwood (Carter Brown kick), 11:03. Golden Eagles 49–7. Drive: 11 plays, 68 yards, 6:48.
- EKU - Ryder Hooks 18-yard run (Devin Orr kick), 7:44. Golden Eagles 49–14. Drive: 6 plays, 75 yards, 3:15.
- EKU - Blake Kendall Jr. 1-yard run, 0:00. Golden Eagles 49–20. Drive: 8 plays, 80 yards, 1:52.

Statistics	EKU	TNTC
First downs	14	29
Plays–yards	50–301	68–453
Rushes–yards	38–267	36–238
Passing yards	34	215
Passing: comp–att–int	5–12–2	24–32–1
Turnovers	2	1
Time of possession	24:42	35:18

Team	Category	Player	Statistics
Eastern Kentucky	Passing	Jordyn Potts	5/12, 34 yards, 2 INT
Eastern Kentucky	Rushing	Ryder Hooks	10 carries, 166 yards, TD
Eastern Kentucky	Receiving	Camerton Hergott	2 receptions, 17 yards
Tennessee Tech	Passing	Jax Leatherwood	22/30, 199 yards, 3 TD, INT
Tennessee Tech	Rushing	M. J. Flowers	13 carries, 108 yards, TD
Tennessee Tech	Receiving	Tre' Holloway	7 receptions, 78 yards, 2TD

=== West Florida ===
West Florida Argonauts (4–2) at Eastern Kentucky Colonels (2–5) – Game summary

Quarter	1	2	3	4	Total
Argonauts	0	10	3	0	13
Colonels	7	3	3	3	16

at Roy Kidd Stadium • Richmond, Kentucky

- Date: October 24
- Game time: 3:00 p.m.
- Game weather: Sunny • Temperature: 72 °F (22 °C) • Wind: W at 2 miles per hour (3.2 km/h)
- Game attendance: 6,281
- Referee: Mike Lennie
- TV announcers (ESPN+): Wes Chandler (play-by-play), Jonathan Duff (analyst) and Michelle Knezovic (sideline)

Game information

First quarter

- (12:14) EKU – Elijah Caldwell 4-yard pass from Blake Kendall, Devin Orr kick (Drive: 4 plays, 54 yards, 1:56; Eastern Kentucky 7–0)

Second quarter

- (11:55) EKU – Devin Orr 34-yard field goal (Drive: 8 plays, 35 yards, 5:10; Eastern Kentucky 10–0)
- (0:58) UWF – Luc Carroll 15-yard pass from Ty'ray Davis, Reid Grek kick (Drive: 9 plays, 80 yards, 1:51; Eastern Kentucky 10–7)
- (0:00) UWF – Reid Grek 43-yard field goal (Drive: 2 plays, 30 yards, 0:16; Tied 10–10)

Third quarter

- (12:01) UWF – Reid Grek 38-yard field goal (Drive: 5 plays, 9 yards, 1:27; West Florida 13–10)
- (4:59) EKU – Devin Orr 36-yard field goal (Drive: 4 plays, 8 yards, 1:30; Tied 13–13)

Fourth quarter

- (9:01) EKU – Devin Orr 33-yard field goal (Drive: 5 plays, 16 yards, 2:10; Eastern Kentucky 16–13)

Statistics	UWF	EKU
First downs	14	11
Plays–yards	55–225	64–261
Rushes–yards	23–88	37–50
Passing yards	137	211
Passing: comp–att–int	14–32–0	17–27–0
Turnovers	2	1
Time of possession	24:24	35:36

Team	Category	Player	Statistics
West Florida	Passing	Ty'ray Davis	14/32, 137 yards, TD
West Florida	Rushing	Ty'ray Davis	13 carries, 45 yards
West Florida	Receiving	Tyshon Mansell	6 receptions, 80 yards
Eastern Kentucky	Passing	Blake Kendall	16/26, 163 yards, TD
Eastern Kentucky	Rushing	Brady Hensley	15 carries, 30 yards
Eastern Kentucky	Receiving	Jayden West	2 receptions, 68 yards

=== at No. 1 Tarleton State ===
Eastern Kentucky Colonels (3–5) at No. 1 Tarleton State Texans (8–0) – Game summary

Quarter	1	2	3	4	Total
Colonels	0	14	3	7	24
No. 1 Texans	7	7	0	14	28

at Memorial Stadium • Stephenville, Texas

- Date: October 31
- Game time: 7:00 p.m.

Game information

First quarter
Second quarter
Third quarter
Fourth quarter

Statistics	EKU	TAR
First downs	21	24
Plays–yards		
Rushes–yards		
Passing yards		
Passing: comp–att–int		
Turnovers		
Time of possession		

Team	Category	Player	Statistics
Eastern Kentucky	Passing	Myles Burkett	11/17, 248 yards, 1 TD
Eastern Kentucky	Rushing	Brady Hensley	22 carries, 139 yards, 2 TD
Eastern Kentucky	Receiving	Jayden West	2 receptions, 105 yards
Tarleton State	Passing	Kaden Anderson	18/32, 351 yards, 2 TD, 2 INT
Tarleton State	Rushing	Tylan Hines	15 carries, 110 yards
Tarleton State	Receiving	Marquis Willis	4 receptions, 173 yards, 1 TD

=== at No. 7 Austin Peay ===
Eastern Kentucky Colonels (3–6) at No. 7 Austin Peay Governors (7–2) – Game summary

Quarter	1	2	3	4	Total
Colonels	0	0	0	0	0
No. 7 Governors	0	0	0	0	0

at Fortera Stadium • Clarksville, Tennessee

- Date: November 7
- Game time: 5:00 p.m.

Game information

First quarter
Second quarter
Third quarter
Fourth quarter

Statistics	EKU	APSU
First downs		
Plays–yards		
Rushes–yards		
Passing yards		
Passing: comp–att–int		
Turnovers		
Time of possession		

Team	Category	Player	Statistics
Eastern Kentucky	Passing		
Eastern Kentucky	Rushing		
Eastern Kentucky	Receiving		
Austin Peay	Passing		
Austin Peay	Rushing		
Austin Peay	Receiving		

=== Central Arkansas ===
Central Arkansas Bears (3–7) at Eastern Kentucky Colonels (3–7) – Game summary

Quarter	1	2	3	4	Total
Bears	0	0	0	0	0
Colonels	0	0	0	0	0

at Roy Kidd Stadium • Richmond, Kentucky

- Date: November 14
- Game time: 2:00 p.m.

Game information

First quarter
Second quarter
Third quarter
Fourth quarter

Statistics	CARK	EKU
First downs		
Plays–yards		
Rushes–yards		
Passing yards		
Passing: comp–att–int		
Turnovers		
Time of possession		

Team	Category	Player	Statistics
Central Arkansas	Passing		
Central Arkansas	Rushing		
Central Arkansas	Receiving		
Eastern Kentucky	Passing		
Eastern Kentucky	Rushing		
Eastern Kentucky	Receiving		

=== at No. 19 Abilene Christian ===
Eastern Kentucky Colonels (3–8) at No. 19 Abilene Christian Wildcats (6–5) – Game summary

Quarter	1	2	3	4	Total
Colonels	0	0	0	0	0
No. 19 Wildcats	0	0	0	0	0

at Wildcat Stadium • Abilene, Texas

- Date: November 21
- Game time: 2:00 p.m.

Game information

First quarter
Second quarter
Third quarter
Fourth quarter

Statistics	EKU	ACU
First downs		
Plays–yards		
Rushes–yards		
Passing yards		
Passing: comp–att–int		
Turnovers		
Time of possession		

Team	Category	Player	Statistics
Eastern Kentucky	Passing		
Eastern Kentucky	Rushing		
Eastern Kentucky	Receiving		
Abilene Christian	Passing		
Abilene Christian	Rushing		
Abilene Christian	Receiving		

== Rankings ==
Ranking movements Legend: — = Not ranked RV = Received votes
	Week														
Poll	Pre	1	2	3	4	5	6	7	8	9	10	11	12	13	Final
STATS	—														
Coaches	RV														
