= 2026 Delaware Fightin' Blue Hens football team =

American college football season

2026 Delaware Fightin' Blue Hens football
- Conference: Conference USA
- Record: 6–5 (4–3 CUSA)
- Head coach: Ryan Carty (5th season)
- Offensive coordinator: Terence Archer (3rd season)
- Offensive scheme: Spread option
- Defensive coordinator: Manny Rojas (7th season)
- Base defense: 3–3–5
- Home stadium: Delaware Stadium

2026 Conference USA football standings
	Conf.			Overall
Team	W		L	W		L
Liberty y	7	–	0	10	–	1
Jacksonville State y	6	–	1	8	–	3
Delaware	4	–	3	6	–	5
Middle Tennessee	4	–	3	6	–	5
Kennesaw State	4	–	3	5	–	6
Missouri State	3	–	4	4	–	7
Western Kentucky	3	–	4	4	–	7
FIU	2	–	5	4	–	7
New Mexico State	2	–	5	3	–	8
Sam Houston	0	–	7	1	–	10
Championship: Jacksonville State at Liberty
y – Championship game participant; As of November 22, 2026; Rankings from AP poll

The 2026 Delaware Fightin' Blue Hens football team represents the University of Delaware as a member of the Conference USA (CUSA) during the 2026 NCAA Division I FBS football season. They are led by their fifth-year head coach Ryan Carty and play their home games at Delaware Stadium in Newark, Delaware.

The 2026 season is Delaware's second year in CUSA since transitioning from the NCAA Division I Football Championship Subdivision (FCS).

== Offseason ==
=== Transfers ===
==== Outgoing ====
Player	Position	Destination

==== Incoming ====
Player	Position	Previous school

== Schedule ==
Date	Time	Opponent	Site	TV	Result	Attendance
September 3	7:00 p.m.	Merrimack (FCS)*	Delaware Stadium; Newark, DE	ESPN+	W 42–7	17,268
September 12	4:15 p.m.	at Vanderbilt*	FirstBank Stadium; Nashville, TN	SECN	L 26–35	35,000
September 19	11:30 a.m.	Coastal Carolina*	Delaware Stadium; Newark, DE	CBSSN	W 22–14	17,937
September 26	6:00 p.m.	at Virginia*	Scott Stadium; Charlottesville, VA	ACCN	L 3–42	41,935
October 2	7:00 p.m.	Liberty	Delaware Stadium; Newark, DE	CBSSN	L 14–30	19,182
October 13	7:00 p.m.	at Middle Tennessee	Johnny "Red" Floyd Stadium; Murfreesboro, TN	CBSSN	L 30–33	8,606
October 20	7:00 p.m.	Missouri State	Delaware Stadium; Newark, DE	ESPNU	W 61–38	14,214
October 27	7:00 p.m.	at Western Kentucky	Houchens Industries–L. T. Smith Stadium; Bowling Green, KY	CBSSN	W 35–21	12,147
November 7	3:00 p.m.	at Kennesaw State	Fifth Third Bank Stadium; Kennesaw, GA	ESPN+	L 40–42	10,300
November 14	3:00 p.m.	FIU^{†}	Delaware Stadium; Newark, DE	ESPN+	W 24–16	18,127
November 21	3:00 p.m.	at New Mexico State	Aggie Memorial Stadium; Las Cruces, NM	ESPN+	W 42–30	5,413
November 28	3:30 p.m.	Jacksonville State	Delaware Stadium; Newark, DE	CBSSN		
*Non-conference game; ^{†}Homecoming; All times are in Eastern time

== Game summaries ==
=== Merrimack (FCS) ===
Game One - Merrimack Warriors (FCS) (0–1) at Delaware Fightin' Blue Hens (0–0) - Game summary

Quarter	1	2	3	4	Total
Warriors (FCS)	0	0	7	0	7
Fightin' Blue Hens	7	14	14	7	42

at Delaware Stadium • Newark, Delaware

- Date: September 3
- Game time: 7:00 p.m. EDT
- Game weather: Sunny
- Game attendance: 17,268
- Referee: Douglas Mercer
- TV announcers (ESPN+): Scott Klatzkin and Pat Devlin

Game information

First quarter

- DEL – Viron Ellison Jr. 11-yard run (Tucker Smack kick), 7:35. Fightin' Blue Hens 7–0. Drive: 9 plays, 50 yards, 4:06.

Second quarter

- DEL – Nick Minicucci 12-yard run (Tucker Smack kick), 3:55. Fightin' Blue Hens 14–0. Drive: 6 plays, 80 yards, 1:48.
- DEL – Sean Wilson 12-yard pass from Nick Minicucci (Tucker Smack kick), 0:16. Fightin' Blue Hens 21–0. Drive: 1 play, 12 yards, 0:07.

Third quarter

- DEL – Kaderris Roberts 1-yard run (Tucker Smack kick), 10:35. Fightin' Blue Hens 28–0. Drive: 11 plays, 83 yards, 4:21.
- DEL – Kaderris Roberts 75-yard pass from Viron Ellison Jr. (Tucker Smack kick), 9:11. Fightin' Blue Hens 35–0. Drive: 1 play, 75 yards, 0:13.
- Galamama Mulbah 7-yard run (Guytano Bartolomeo kick), 0:58. Fightin' Blue Hens 35–7. Drive: 4 plays, 30 yards, 1:17.

Fourth quarter

- DEL – Nick Tyree 8-yard pass from Nick Minicucci (Tucker Smack kick), 14:48. Fightin' Blue Hens 42–7. Drive: 5 plays, 72 yards, 1:05.

Statistics	MRMK	DEL
First downs	13	27
Plays–yards	70–244	73–547
Rushes–yards	25–48	29–112
Passing yards	196	435
Passing: comp–att–int	21–45–1	24–44–1
Turnovers	2	1
Time of possession	31:49	27:18

Team	Category	Player	Statistics
Merrimack	Passing	Cole Meehan	10/25, 121 yards
Merrimack	Rushing	Galamama Mulbah	7 carries, 41 yards, TD
Merrimack	Receiving	Matthias Latham	3 receptions, 36 yards
Delaware	Passing	Nick Minicucci	20/36, 330 yards, 3 TD, INT
Delaware	Rushing	Nakeem Powell	5 carries, 35 yards
Delaware	Receiving	Kaderris Roberts	2 receptions, 80 yards, TD

=== at Vanderbilt ===
Game Two - Delaware Fightin' Blue Hens (1–0) at Vanderbilt Commodores (1–0) - Game summary

Quarter	1	2	3	4	Total
Fightin' Blue Hens	0	17	0	9	26
Commodores	14	0	21	0	35

at FirstBank Stadium • Nashville, Tennessee

- Date: September 12
- Game time: 4:15 p.m. EDT
- Game weather: Cloudy • Temperature: 87 °F (31 °C) • Wind: W at 7 miles per hour (11 km/h)
- Game attendance: 35,000
- Referee: Adam Savoie
- TV announcers (SEC Network): Dave Neal, Cole Cubelic, and Tori Petry

Game information

First quarter

- VAN – Jared Curtis 1-yard run (Brock Taylor kick), 1:19. Commodores 7–0. Drive: 7 plays, 41 yards, 3:25.
- VAN – Sedrick Alexander 9-yard run (Brock Taylor kick), 0:00. Commodores 14–0. Drive: 3 plays, 26 yards, 1:14.

Second quarter

- DEL – Tucker Smack 37-yard field goal, 12:51. Commodores 14–3. Drive: 6 plays, 55 yards, 2:09.
- DEL – Viron Ellison Jr. 1-yard run (Tucker Smack kick), 1:56. Commodores 14–10. Drive: 10 plays, 82 yards, 5:20.
- DEL – Bryson Graves 0-yard blocked punt return (Tucker Smack kick), 0:17. Fightin' Blue Hens 17–14.

Third quarter

- VAN – Jared Curtis 1-yard run (Brock Taylor kick), 11:05. Commodores 21–17. Drive: 9 plays, 70 yards, 3:48.
- VAN – Austin Howard 0-yard blocked punt return (Brock Taylor kick), 9:30. Commodores 28–17.
- VAN – Walter Taylor 19-yard pass from Jared Curtis (Brock Taylor kick), 0:00. Commodores 35–17. Drive: 10 plays, 60 yards, 5:13.

Fourth quarter

- DEL – Tucker Smack 40-yard field goal, 11:55. Commodores 35–20. Drive: 8 plays, 52 yards, 3:05.
- DEL – Da'Wain Lofton 43-yard pass from Nick Minicucci (pass failed), 6:37. Commodores 35–26. Drive: 4 plays, 80 yards, 2:13.

Statistics	DEL	VAN
First downs	18	17
Plays–yards	68–338	69–339
Rushes–yards	36–98	38–100
Passing yards	240	239
Passing: comp–att–int	15–32–2	17–31–0
Turnovers	2	1
Time of possession	31:20	28:40

Team	Category	Player	Statistics
Delaware	Passing	Nick Minicucci	11/27, 182 yards, TD, 2 INT
Delaware	Rushing	Jo Silver	16 carries, 109 yards
Delaware	Receiving	Da'Wain Lofton	4 receptions, 142 yards, TD
Vanderbilt	Passing	Jared Curtis	14/22, 210 yards, TD
Vanderbilt	Rushing	Sedrick Alexander	9 carries, 39 yards, TD
Vanderbilt	Receiving	Junior Sherrill	5 receptions, 94 yards

=== Coastal Carolina ===
Game Three - Coastal Carolina Chanticleers (1–1) at Delaware Fightin' Blue Hens (1–1) - Game summary

Quarter	1	2	3	4	Total
Chanticleers	7	7	0	0	14
Fightin' Blue Hens	0	15	0	7	22

at Delaware Stadium • Newark, Delaware

- Date: September 19
- Game time: 11:30 a.m. EDT
- Game weather: Sunny
- Game attendance: 17,937
- Referee: Ron Hudson
- TV announcers (CBSSN): Alex Barrio (play-by-play) and Doug Pederson (analyst)

Game information

First quarter

- CCU – Goldie Lawrence 62-yard pass from Deuce Bailey (Nico Cavanillas Alti kick), 7:51. Chanticleers 7–0. Drive: 5 plays, 95 yards, 2:19.

Second quarter

- DEL – Sean Wilson 40-yard pass from Nick Minicucci (Tucker Smack kick), 12:38. Tied 7–7. Drive: 5 plays, 70 yards, 2:14.
- CCU – Colton Hinton 27-yard pass from Deuce Bailey (Nico Cavanillas Alti kick), 8:19. Chanticleers 14–7. Drive: 9 plays, 72 yards, 4:13.
- DEL –Jo Silver 2-yard run (Nick Minicucci two-point conversion run), 0:35. Fighting Blue Hens 15–14. Drive: 6 plays, 60 yards, 1:11.

Fourth quarter

- DEL – Sean Wilson 36-yard pass from Nick Minicucci (Tucker Smack kick), 8:19. Fighting Blue Hens 22–14. Drive: 1 play, 36 yards, 0:08.

Statistics	CCU	DEL
First downs	21	22
Total yards	385	395
Rushing yards	135	93
Passing yards	250	302
Passing: Comp–Att–Int	16-26-0	24-32-0
Time of possession	27:52	32:08

Team	Category	Player	Statistics
Coastal Carolina	Passing	Deuce Bailey	16/26, 250 yards, 2 TDs
Coastal Carolina	Rushing	Jevon Edwards	14 carries, 49 yards
Coastal Carolina	Receiving	Goldie Lawrence	1 reception, 62 yards, TD
Delaware	Passing	Nick Minicucci	24/32, 302 yards, 2 TDs
Delaware	Rushing	Viron Ellison Jr.	6 carries, 30 yards
Delaware	Receiving	Sean Wilson	9 receptions, 185 yards, 2 TDs

=== at Virginia ===
Game Four - Delaware Fightin' Blue Hens (2–1) at Virginia Cavaliers (2–1) - Game summary

Quarter	1	2	3	4	Total
Fightin' Blue Hens	0	3	0	0	3
Cavaliers	7	21	7	7	42

at Scott Stadium • Charlottesville, Virginia

- Date: September 26
- Game time: 6:00 p.m. EDT
- Game attendance: 41,935
- TV announcers (ACCN): Jorge Sedano, Rodney McLeod and Kendra Douglas

Statistics	DEL	UVA
First downs	12	33
Plays–yards	57–160	85–556
Rushes–yards	30–89	41–119
Passing yards	71	437
Passing: comp–att–int	7–27–2	33–44–0
Turnovers	2	1
Time of possession	23:49	36:11

Team	Category	Player	Statistics
Delaware	Passing	Riley Trujillo	1/3, 38 yards
Delaware	Rushing	Jo Silver	12 carries, 49 yards
Delaware	Receiving	Tae'Sean Robinson	1 catch, 38 yards
Virginia	Passing	Beau Pribula	24/28, 279 yards, 4 TD
Virginia	Rushing	Xay Davis	10 carries, 30 yards
Virginia	Receiving	Rico Flores Jr.	9 catches, 113 yards, TD

=== Liberty ===
Game Five - Liberty Flames (3–1) at Delaware Fightin' Blue Hens (2–2) - Game summary

Quarter	1	2	3	4	Total
Flames	6	14	3	7	30
Fightin' Blue Hens	0	0	0	14	14

at Delaware Stadium • Newark, Delaware

- Date: October 2
- Game time: 7:00 p.m. EDT
- Game weather: Rain • Temperature: 82 °F (28 °C)
- Game attendance: 19,182
- Referee: Stuart Mullins
- TV announcers (CBSSN): Alex Del Barrio (play-by-play), Emory Hunt (analyst)

Statistics	LIB	DEL
First downs	23	16
Plays–yards	72–439	60–359
Rushes–yards	47–282	25–102
Passing yards	157	257
Passing: comp–att–int	13–25–0	17–35–1
Turnovers	0	2
Time of possession	38:31	21:28

Team	Category	Player	Statistics
Liberty	Passing	Deshawn Purdie	13/20, 157 yards
Liberty	Rushing	Kam Davis	17 carries, 147 yards, 2 TD
Liberty	Receiving	Makai Jackson	5 receptions, 90 yards
Delaware	Passing	EJ Archield Jr.	10/19, 137 yards
Delaware	Rushing	Tyler Bell	6 carries, 32 yards
Delaware	Receiving	Bryson Graves	3 receptions, 69 yards

=== at Middle Tennessee ===
Game Six - Delaware Fightin' Blue Hens (2–3) at Middle Tennessee Blue Raiders (2–3) – Game summary

Quarter	1	2	3	4	Total
Fightin' Blue Hens	0	0	0	0	0
Blue Raiders	0	0	0	0	0

at Johnny "Red" Floyd Stadium • Murfreesboro, Tennessee

- Date: October 13
- Game time: 7:00 p.m. EDT
- Game attendance: 8,606
- TV: CBSSN

Game information

First quarter
Second quarter
Third quarter
Fourth quarter

Statistics	DEL	MTSU
First downs	22	22
Plays–yards	67-391	58-396
Rushes–yards	30-70	25-105
Passing yards	321	291
Passing: comp–att–int	23-37-1	22-33-1
Turnovers	1	2
Time of possession	32:15	27:45

Team	Category	Player	Statistics
Delaware	Passing	Tyler Bell	22/36, 306 yards, 2 TD
Delaware	Rushing	Viron Ellison Jr.	4 carries, 19 yards
Delaware	Receiving	Donovan Lewis	6 receptions, 83 yards
Middle Tennessee	Passing	Roman Gagliano	22/32, 291 yards, 3 TD
Middle Tennessee	Rushing	Antonio Martin	11 carries, 48 yards
Middle Tennessee	Receiving	Koraun Perdue	4 receptions, 103 yards, TD

=== Missouri State ===
Game Seven - Missouri State Bears (2–4) at Delaware Fightin' Blue Hens (2–4) - Game summary

Quarter	1	2	3	4	Total
Bears	14	14	7	3	38
Fightin' Blue Hens	7	17	21	16	61

at Delaware Stadium • Newark, Delaware

- Date: October 20
- Game time: 7:00 p.m. EDT
- Game attendance: 14,214
- TV: ESPNU

Statistics	MOST	DEL
First downs	22	26
Plays–yards	58-431	75-482
Rushes–yards	23-94	42-232
Passing yards	337	250
Passing: comp–att–int	26-35-2	22-33-1
Turnovers	3	1
Time of possession	25:17	34:43

Team	Category	Player	Statistics
Missouri State	Passing	Henry Belin	26/35, 337 yards, 2 TD
Missouri State	Rushing	Connor Lair	15 carries, 85 yards, 2 TD
Missouri State	Receiving	Isaiah Myers	11 receptions, 242 yards, 2 TD
Delaware	Passing	Nick Minicucci	20/29, 225 yards, 5 TD
Delaware	Rushing	Jo Silver	13 carries, 101 yards, TD
Delaware	Receiving	Sean Wilson	6 catches, 69 yards

=== at Western Kentucky ===
Game Eight - Delaware Fightin' Blue Hens (3–4) at Western Kentucky Hilltoppers (3–4) - Game summary

Quarter	1	2	3	4	Total
Fightin' Blue Hens	7	21	7	0	35
Hilltoppers	14	7	0	0	21

at Houchens Industries–L. T. Smith Stadium • Bowling Green, Kentucky

- Date: October 27
- Game time: 7:00 p.m. EDT
- Game attendance: 12,147
- TV: CBSSN

Statistics	DEL	WKU
First downs	25	24
Plays–yards	66-495	77-477
Rushes–yards	28-81	34-232
Passing yards	414	245
Passing: comp–att–int	32-38-0	26-43-2
Turnovers	1	2
Time of possession	30:32	29:288

Team	Category	Player	Statistics
Delaware	Passing	Nick Minicucci	32/38, 414 yards, 4 TD
Delaware	Rushing	Jo Silver	13 carries, 49 yards
Delaware	Receiving	Sean Wilson	9 receptions, 183 yards, 2 TD
Western Kentucky	Passing	Brock Glenn	25/37, 224 yards, TD
Western Kentucky	Rushing	Brock Glenn	17 carries, 129 yards
Western Kentucky	Receiving	Moussa Barry	4 receptions, 80 yards

=== at Kennesaw State ===
Game Nine - Delaware Fightin' Blue Hens (4–4) at Kennesaw State Owls (2–6) - Game summary

Quarter	1	2	3	4	Total
Fightin' Blue Hens	15	10	9	6	40
Owls	13	17	3	9	42

at Fifth Third Stadium • Kennesaw, Georgia

- Date: November 7
- Game time: 3:00 p.m. EDT
- Game attendance: 10,300
- TV: ESPN+

Statistics	DEL	KENN
First downs		
Plays–yards		
Rushes–yards		
Passing yards		
Passing: comp–att–int		
Turnovers		
Time of possession		

Team	Category	Player	Statistics
Delaware	Passing		
Delaware	Rushing		
Delaware	Receiving		
Kennesaw State	Passing		
Kennesaw State	Rushing		
Kennesaw State	Receiving		

=== FIU (HC) ===
Game Ten - FIU Panthers (4–5) at Delaware Fightin' Blue Hens (4–5) - Game summary

Quarter	1	2	3	4	Total
Panthers	7	0	0	9	16
Fightin' Blue Hens	7	0	3	14	24

at Delaware Stadium • Newark, Delaware

- Date: November 14
- Game time: 3:00 p.m. EDT
- TV: ESPN+

Statistics	FIU	DEL
First downs		
Plays–yards		
Rushes–yards		
Passing yards		
Passing: comp–att–int		
Turnovers		
Time of possession		

Team	Category	Player	Statistics
FIU	Passing		
FIU	Rushing		
FIU	Receiving		
Delaware	Passing		
Delaware	Rushing		
Delaware	Receiving		

=== at New Mexico State ===
Game Eleven - Delaware Fightin' Blue Hens (5–5) at New Mexico State Aggies (3–7) - Game summary

Quarter	1	2	3	4	Total
Fightin' Blue Hens	7	7	14	14	42
Aggies	3	13	0	14	30

at Aggie Memorial Stadium • Las Cruces, New Mexico

- Date: November 21
- Game time: 3:00 p.m. EDT
- TV: ESPN+

Statistics	DEL	NMSU
First downs		
Plays–yards		
Rushes–yards		
Passing yards		
Passing: comp–att–int		
Turnovers		
Time of possession		

Team	Category	Player	Statistics
Delaware	Passing		
Delaware	Rushing		
Delaware	Receiving		
New Mexico State	Passing		
New Mexico State	Rushing		
New Mexico State	Receiving		

=== Jacksonville State ===
Game Twelve - Jacksonville State Gamecocks (0–0) at Delaware Fightin' Blue Hens (0–0) - Game summary

Quarter	1	2	3	4	Total
Gamecocks	0	0	0	0	0
Fightin' Blue Hens	0	0	0	0	0

at Delaware Stadium • Newark, Delaware

- Date: November 28
- Game time: 3:30 p.m. EDT
- TV: ESPN+

Statistics	JVST	DEL
First downs		
Plays–yards		
Rushes–yards		
Passing yards		
Passing: comp–att–int		
Turnovers		
Time of possession		

Team	Category	Player	Statistics
Jacksonville State	Passing		
Jacksonville State	Rushing		
Jacksonville State	Receiving		
Delaware	Passing		
Delaware	Rushing		
Delaware	Receiving		
