= 2026 FIU Panthers football team =

American college football season

2026 FIU Panthers football
- Conference: Conference USA
- Record: 4–7 (2–5 CUSA)
- Head coach: Willie Simmons (2nd season)
- Offensive coordinator: Nick Coleman (2nd season)
- Defensive coordinator: Jovan Dewitt (5th season)
- Home stadium: Pitbull Stadium

2026 Conference USA football standings
	Conf.			Overall
Team	W		L	W		L
Liberty y	7	–	0	9	–	1
Jacksonville State y	6	–	1	8	–	3
Kennesaw State	4	–	3	5	–	6
Middle Tennessee	4	–	3	6	–	5
Delaware	4	–	3	6	–	5
Western Kentucky	3	–	4	4	–	7
Missouri State	3	–	4	4	–	7
FIU	2	–	5	4	–	7
New Mexico State	2	–	5	3	–	8
Sam Houston	0	–	7	1	–	10
Championship: Jacksonville State at Liberty
y – Championship game participant; As of November 22, 2026; Rankings from AP poll

The 2026 FIU Panthers football team is the program at Florida International University (FIU) as they are a member of Conference USA (CUSA) during the 2026 NCAA Division I FBS football season. The Panthers will be led by Willie Simmons in his second year as the head coach. The Panthers will play their home games at Pitbull Stadium in Miami.

== Schedule ==
Date	Time	Opponent	Site	TV	Result	Attendance
September 5	7:00 p.m.	at South Florida*	Raymond James Stadium; Tampa, FL	ESPN+	L 9–19	41,847
September 12	6:00 p.m.	Buffalo*	Pitbull Stadium; Miami, FL	ESPN+	W 33–20	18,202
September 19	6:00 p.m.	at Florida Atlantic*	Flagler Credit Union Stadium; Boca Raton, FL (Shula Bowl)	ESPN+	L 10–16	20,714
September 26	6:00 p.m.	LIU*	Pitbull Stadium; Miami, FL	ESPN+	W 20–3	17,003
October 7	7:30 p.m.	New Mexico State	Pitbull Stadium; Miami, FL	ESPN2	W 22–3	10,013
October 13	8:00 p.m.	at Jacksonville State	AmFirst Stadium; Jacksonville, AL	ESPNU	L 24–27	17,224
October 20	7:00 p.m.	Middle Tennessee	Pitbull Stadium; Miami, FL	CBSSN	L 23–26	8,230
October 31	3:30 p.m.	at Liberty	Williams Stadium; Lynchburg, VA	CBSSN	L 10–49	16,702
November 7	4:00 p.m.	Missouri State^{†}	Pitbull Stadium; Miami, FL	ESPN+	W 23–20	10,575
November 14	3:00 p.m.	at Delaware	Delaware Stadium; Newark, DE	ESPN+	L 16–24	18,127
November 21	3:00 p.m.	at Kennesaw State	Fifth Third Stadium; Kennesaw, GA	ESPN+	L 24–35	6,672
November 28	2:00 p.m.	Sam Houston	Pitbull Stadium; Miami, FL	ESPN+		
*Non-conference game; ^{†}Homecoming; All times are in Eastern time

== Game summaries ==
All game times in Eastern time

=== at South Florida ===
Game One – FIU Panthers (0–0) at South Florida Bulls (0–0) – Game summary

Quarter	1	2	3	4	Total
Panthers	0	0	3	6	9
Bulls	3	3	0	13	19

at Raymond James Stadium • Tampa, FL

- Date: September 5
- Game time: 7:00 p.m.
- Game weather: Sunny • Temperature: 93 °F (34 °C)
- Game attendance: 41,847
- Referee: Edwin Lee
- TV announcers (ESPN+): AJ Ricketts (play-by-play), Patrick Murray (analyst) and Maria Trivelpiece (sideline)
- Recap

Game information

First quarter

- USF – Nico Gramatica 37-yard field goal, 0:00. Bulls 3–0. Drive: 10 plays, 39 yards, 5:27.

Second quarter

- USF – Nico Gramatica 53-yard field goal, 10:26. Bulls 6–0. Drive: 6 plays, 15 yards, 2:42.

Third quarter

- FIU – Robert Czeremcha 29-yard field goal, 9:04. Bulls 6–3. Drive: 14 plays, 63 yards, 5:56.

Fourth quarter

- USF – D. J. Crowther 1-yard run (Nico Gramatica kick), 13:07. Bulls 13–3. Drive: 9 plays, 35 yards, 5:25.
- USF – Nico Gramatica 30-yard field goal, 7:03. Bulls 16–3. Drive: 9 plays, 24 yards, 4:08.
- USF – Nico Gramatica 29-yard field goal, 1:44. Bulls 19–3. Drive: 7 plays, 29 yards, 2:33.
- FIU – James Resar 21-yard pass from JJ Kohl, 0:00. Bulls 19–9. Drive: 7 plays, 87 yards, 1:40.

Statistics	FIU	USF
First downs	19	14
Plays–yards	75–381	56–208
Rushes–yards	25–80	38–108
Passing yards	301	100
Passing: comp–att–int	31–50–2	11–18–0
Turnovers	3	0
Time of possession	29:51	30:09

Team	Category	Player	Statistics
FIU	Passing	JJ Kohl	31/50, 301 yards, TD, 2 INT
FIU	Rushing	JJ Kohl	6 carries, 31 yards
FIU	Receiving	Maguire Anderson	8 receptions, 87 yards
South Florida	Passing	Michael Van Buren Jr.	11/18, 100 yards
South Florida	Rushing	Jason Collins Jr.	17 carries, 59 yards
South Florida	Receiving	Arhmad Branch	5 receptions, 47 yards

=== vs. Buffalo ===
Game Two – Buffalo Bulls (1–0) at FIU Panthers (0–1) – Game summary

Quarter	1	2	3	4	Total
Bulls	3	3	8	6	20
Panthers	14	7	9	3	33

at Pitbull Stadium • Miami, FL

- Date: September 12
- Game time: 6:00 p.m.
- Game weather: Cloudy • Temperature: 83 °F (28 °C)
- Game attendance: 18,202
- Referee: Stuart Mullins
- TV announcers (ESPN+): Corey Brooks, Jermon Bushrod, Billy Gil, and Sydney Jones

Game information

First quarter

- FIU – Maguire Anderson 45-yard pass from JJ Kohl (Robert Czeremcha kick), 9:32. Panthers 7–0. Drive: 6 plays, 87 yards, 3:59.
- BUFF – Oliver Hautanen 51-yard field goal, 6:27. Panthers 7–3. Drive: 9 plays, 41 yards, 3:13.
- FIU – JJ Kohl 19-yard pass from Jojo Stone (Robert Czeremcha kick), 3:37. Panthers 14–3. Drive: 4 plays, 75 yards, 0:51.

Second quarter

- FIU – Maguire Anderson 14-yard pass from JJ Kohl (Robert Czeremcha kick), 2:25. Panthers 21–3. Drive: 9 plays, 60 yards, 4:18.
- BUFF – Oliver Hautanen 45-yard field goal, 1:49. Panthers 21–6. Drive: 10 plays, 47 yards, 5:11.

Third quarter

- BUFF – Chance Morrow 2-yard pass from Jason Wright (Jason Wright run), 9:35. Panthers 21–14. Drive: 6 plays, 64 yards, 3:51.
- FIU – Jojo Stone 68-yard pass from JJ Kohl (Robert Czeremcha kick BLOCKED), 8:03. Panthers 27–14. Drive: 3 plays, 75 yards, 1:32.
- FIU – Robert Czeremcha 36-yard field goal, 3:43. Panthers 30–14. Drive: 9 plays, 58 yards, 3:21.

Fourth quarter

- FIU – Robert Czeremcha 35-yard field goal, 8:22. Panthers 33–14. Drive: 7 plays, 19 yards, 2:40.
- BUFF – Chance Morrow 23-yard pass from Jason Wright (run failed), 5:58. Panthers 33–20. Drive: 8 plays, 75 yards, 2:24.

Statistics	BUFF	FIU
First downs	13	22
Plays–yards	66–308	76–540
Rushes–yards	25–62	39–154
Passing yards	246	386
Passing: Comp–Att–Int	22–41–1	22–37–0
Turnovers	3	1
Time of possession	26:43	33:17

Team	Category	Player	Statistics
Buffalo	Passing	Jason Wright	13/27, 185 yards, 2 TD, INT
Buffalo	Rushing	Terrance Shelton Jr.	8 carries, 29 yards
Buffalo	Receiving	Chance Morrow	11 receptions, 170 yards, 2 TD
FIU	Passing	JJ Kohl	21/36, 367 yards, 3 TD
FIU	Rushing	Anthony Carrie	13 carries, 49 yards
FIU	Receiving	Jojo Stone	5 receptions, 106 yards, TD

=== at Florida Atlantic (Shula Bowl) ===
Game Three – FIU Panthers (1–1) at Florida Atlantic Owls (1–1) – Game summary

Quarter	1	2	3	4	Total
Panthers	0	7	0	3	10
Owls	10	0	6	0	16

at Flagler Credit Union Stadium • Boca Raton, FL

- Date: September 19
- Game time: 6:00 p.m.
- Game weather: Cloudy • Temperature: 82 °F (28 °C) • Wind: SW at 3 mph
- Game attendance: 20,714
- Referee: Matt Overton
- TV announcers (ESPN+): AJ Ricketts (play-by-play), Patrick Murray (analyst) and Maria Trivelpiece (sideline)

Game information

First quarter
Second quarter
Third quarter
Fourth quarter

Statistics	FIU	FAU
First downs	21	17
Total yards	357	258
Rushing yards	95	56
Passing yards	262	202
Passing: Comp–Att–Int	22–43–3	24–36–0
Turnovers	3	0
Time of possession	28:39	26:12

Team	Category	Player	Statistics
FIU	Passing	JJ Kohl	22/43, 262 yards, 3 INT
FIU	Rushing	Anthony Carrie	19 carries, 44 yards
FIU	Receiving	Maguire Anderson	8 receptions, 139 yards
Florida Atlantic	Passing	Caden Veltkamp	24/36, 202 yards
Florida Atlantic	Rushing	Ethan Ervin	13 carries, 36 yards
Florida Atlantic	Receiving	Easton Messer	7 receptions, 83 yards

=== vs. LIU (FCS) ===
Game Four – LIU Sharks (FCS) (0–4) at FIU Panthers (1–2) – Game summary

Quarter	1	2	3	4	Total
Sharks (FCS)	0	0	0	0	0
Panthers	0	0	0	0	0

at Pitbull Stadium • Miami, FL

- Date: September 26
- Game time: 6:00 p.m.
- TV: ESPN+

Game information

First quarter
Second quarter
Third quarter
Fourth quarter

Statistics	LIU	FIU
First downs		
Total yards		
Rushing yards		
Passing yards		
Passing: Comp–Att–Int		
Time of possession		

Team	Category	Player	Statistics
LIU	Passing		
LIU	Rushing		
LIU	Receiving		
FIU	Passing		
FIU	Rushing		
FIU	Receiving		

=== vs. New Mexico State ===
Game Five – New Mexico State Aggies (2–3) at FIU Panthers (2–2) – Game summary

Quarter	1	2	3	4	Total
Aggies	0	0	0	0	0
Panthers	0	0	0	0	0

at Pitbull Stadium • Miami, FL

- Date: October 7
- Game time: 7:30 p.m.
- Game attendance: 10,013
- TV announcers (ESPN2): Cooper Boardman (play-by-play) and Dave Clawson (analyst)

Game information

First quarter
Second quarter
Third quarter
Fourth quarter

Statistics	NMSU	FIU
First downs		
Total yards		
Rushing yards		
Passing yards		
Passing: Comp–Att–Int		
Turnovers		
Time of possession		

Team	Category	Player	Statistics
New Mexico State	Passing		
New Mexico State	Rushing		
New Mexico State	Receiving		
FIU	Passing		
FIU	Rushing		
FIU	Receiving		

=== at Jacksonville State ===
Game Six – FIU Panthers (3–2) at Jacksonville State Gamecocks (4–2) – Game summary

Quarter	1	2	3	4	Total
Panthers	7	10	7	0	24
Gamecocks	14	3	7	3	27

at AmFirst Stadium • Jacksonville, AL

- Date: October 13
- Game time: 8:00 p.m.
- Game weather: Sunny • Temperature: 85 °F (29 °C) • Wind: SW at 0 miles per hour (0 km/h)
- Game attendance: 17,224
- Referee: Douglas Mercer
- TV announcers (ESPNU): Peter Sousa (play-by-play) and Leger Douzable (analyst)

Game information

First quarter

- JVST – Luke Gilbert 38-yard pass from Caden Creel (Garrison Rippa kick), 11:45. Jacksonville State 7–0. Drive: 6 plays, 63 yards, 3:07.
- FIU – Maguire Anderson 50-yard pass from J. J. Kohl (Robert Czeremcha kick), 4:43. Tied 7–7. Drive: 6 plays, 73 yards, 2:20.
- JVST – Deondre Johnson 36-yard pass from Caden Creel (Garrison Rippa kick), 1:48. Jacksonville State 14–7. Drive: 5 plays, 76 yards, 2:50.

Second quarter

- JVST – Garrison Rippa 47-yard field goal, 13:37. Jacksonville State 17–7. Drive: 5 plays, 18 yards, 1:34.
- FIU – Robert Czeremcha 33-yard field goal, 6:51. Jacksonville State 17–10. Drive: 13 plays, 60 yards, 6:46.
- FIU – Maguire Anderson 30-yard pass from J. J. Kohl (Robert Czeremcha kick), 1:41. Tied 17–17. Drive: 8 plays, 52 yards, 2:46.

Third quarter

- JVST – Justus Savage 4-yard run (Garrison Rippa kick), 8:02. Jacksonville State 24–17. Drive: 5 plays, 46 yards, 2:07.
- FIU – Devonte Lyons 8-yard run (Robert Czeremcha kick), 1:06. Tied 24–24. Drive: 12 plays, 75 yards, 6:56.

Fourth quarter

- JVST – Garrison Rippa 26-yard field goal, 0:44. Jacksonville State 27–24. Drive: 13 plays, 82 yards, 4:33.

Statistics	FIU	JVST
First downs	21	19
Total yards	404	387
Rushing yards	124	173
Passing yards	280	214
Passing: Comp–Att–Int	25–41–0	16–22–1
Time of possession	33:44	26:16

Team	Category	Player	Statistics
FIU	Passing	J. J. Kohl	24/38, 278 yards, 2 TD
FIU	Rushing	Devonte Lyons	15 carries, 73 yards, TD
FIU	Receiving	Maguire Anderson	8 receptions, 133 yards, 2 TD
Jacksonville State	Passing	Caden Creel	16/22, 214 yards, 2 TD, INT
Jacksonville State	Rushing	Caden Creel	19 carries, 95 yards
Jacksonville State	Receiving	Deondre Johnson	4 receptions, 93 yards, TD

=== vs. Middle Tennessee ===
Game Seven – Middle Tennessee Blue Raiders (3–3) at FIU Panthers (3–3) – Game summary

Quarter	1	2	3	4	Total
Blue Raiders	0	0	0	0	0
Panthers	0	0	0	0	0

at Pitbull Stadium • Miami, FL

- Date: October 20
- Game time: 7:00 p.m.
- TV: CBSSN

Game information

First quarter
Second quarter
Third quarter
Fourth quarter

Statistics	MTSU	FIU
First downs		
Total yards		
Rushing yards		
Passing yards		
Passing: Comp–Att–Int		
Turnovers		
Time of possession		

Team	Category	Player	Statistics
Middle Tennessee	Passing		
Middle Tennessee	Rushing		
Middle Tennessee	Receiving		
FIU	Passing		
FIU	Rushing		
FIU	Receiving		

=== at Liberty ===
Game Eight – FIU Panthers (3–4) at Liberty Flames (6–1) – Game summary

Quarter	1	2	3	4	Total
Panthers	0	0	0	0	0
Flames	0	0	0	0	0

at Williams Stadium • Lynchburg, VA

- Date: October 31
- Game time: 3:30 p.m.
- TV: CBSSN

Game information

First quarter
Second quarter
Third quarter
Fourth quarter

Statistics	FIU	LIB
First downs		
Total yards		
Rushing yards		
Passing yards		
Passing: Comp–Att–Int		
Time of possession		

Team	Category	Player	Statistics
FIU	Passing		
FIU	Rushing		
FIU	Receiving		
Liberty	Passing		
Liberty	Rushing		
Liberty	Receiving		

=== vs. Missouri State ===
Game Nine – Missouri State Bears (3–5) at FIU Panthers (3–5) – Game summary

Quarter	1	2	3	4	Total
Bears	0	0	0	0	0
Panthers	0	0	0	0	0

at Pitbull Stadium • Miami, FL

- Date: November 7
- Game time: 4:00 p.m.
- TV: ESPN networks

Game information

First quarter
Second quarter
Third quarter
Fourth quarter

Statistics	MOST	FIU
First downs		
Total yards		
Rushing yards		
Passing yards		
Passing: Comp–Att–Int		
Turnovers		
Time of possession		

Team	Category	Player	Statistics
Missouri State	Passing		
Missouri State	Rushing		
Missouri State	Receiving		
FIU	Passing		
FIU	Rushing		
FIU	Receiving		

=== at Delaware ===
Game Ten – FIU Panthers (4–5) at Delaware Fightin' Blue Hens (4–5) – Game summary

Quarter	1	2	3	4	Total
Panthers	0	0	0	0	0
Fightin' Blue Hens	0	0	0	0	0

at Delaware Stadium • Newark, DE

- Date: November 14
- Game time: 3:00 p.m.
- TV: ESPN networks

Game information

First quarter
Second quarter
Third quarter
Fourth quarter

Statistics	FIU	DEL
First downs		
Total yards		
Rushing yards		
Passing yards		
Passing: Comp–Att–Int		
Time of possession		

Team	Category	Player	Statistics
FIU	Passing		
FIU	Rushing		
FIU	Receiving		
Delaware	Passing		
Delaware	Rushing		
Delaware	Receiving		

=== at Kennesaw State ===
Game Eleven – FIU Panthers (4–6) at Kennesaw State Owls (4–6) – Game summary

Quarter	1	2	3	4	Total
Panthers	0	0	0	0	0
Owls	0	0	0	0	0

at Fifth Third Stadium • Kennesaw, GA

- Date: November 21
- Game time: 3:00 p.m.
- TV: ESPN networks

Game information

First quarter
Second quarter
Third quarter
Fourth quarter

Statistics	FIU	KENN
First downs		
Total yards		
Rushing yards		
Passing yards		
Passing: Comp–Att–Int		
Time of possession		

Team	Category	Player	Statistics
FIU	Passing		
FIU	Rushing		
FIU	Receiving		
Kennesaw State	Passing		
Kennesaw State	Rushing		
Kennesaw State	Receiving		

=== vs. Sam Houston ===
Game Twelve – Sam Houston Bearkats (0–0) at FIU Panthers (0–0) – Game summary

Quarter	1	2	3	4	Total
Bearkats	0	0	0	0	0
Panthers	0	0	0	0	0

at Pitbull Stadium • Miami, FL

- Date: November 28
- Game time: 2:00 p.m.
- TV: ESPN networks

Game information

First quarter
Second quarter
Third quarter
Fourth quarter

Statistics	SHSU	FIU
First downs		
Total yards		
Rushing yards		
Passing yards		
Passing: Comp–Att–Int		
Time of possession		

Team	Category	Player	Statistics
Sam Houston	Passing		
Sam Houston	Rushing		
Sam Houston	Receiving		
FIU	Passing		
FIU	Rushing		
FIU	Receiving		

== Roster ==
2026 FIU Panthers football team roster
Players
Coaches
Offense

Pos.	#	Name	Class
WR	0	Jojo Stone	So
RB	1	Anthony Carrie	So
WR	2	Maguire Anderson	Jr
RB	3	Devonte Lyons	So
TE	4	James Resar	So
QB	5	DJ Alexander	Fr
WR	6	Eric Nelson Jr.	So
WR	7	Kyle McNeal	Jr
WR	8	Greg Gaines III	Sr
TE	9	Jackson Verdugo	So
RB	10	Jayden Ford	Fr
QB	11	Zach Marker	GS
WR	12	Amari Isaac	So
WR	13	Tyson Carter	So
WR	14	Kenny Williams	Fr
WR	15	Donovan Giles	Sr
QB	16	Zachary Waters	Jr
QB	17	J. J. Kohl	Jr
WR	18	Andre Brown	So
TE	19	Davis Brown	Fr
QB	20	Matt Ivaldi	Fr
RB	21	Nate Henry	Jr
RB	22	Sterling Joseph	Fr
QB	23	Trey Whirley	So
RB	36	Justin Compere	Fr
OL	50	Jeremy Smith	Fr
OL	51	Manasseh Ripert	Sr
OL	52	Akeem Neal	So
OL	53	Nathan Tveit	Fr
OL	54	Zaire Flournoy	Sr
OL	55	Daveion Harley	Jr
OL	56	Marc Michel Jr.	Fr
OL	58	Oscar Colon	Jr
OL	60	Noah Fernandez	Jr
OL	61	Ignacio Zulaica	Fr
OL	66	Takaylen Muex	Fr
OL	67	Jon Rodriguez	So
OL	71	Antonio Tripp Jr.	Jr
OL	73	Spencer Webb	Sr
OL	74	Matias Garcia	Fr
OL	75	Miguel Cedeno	Sr
OL	76	Samson Chazulle	Fr
OL	77	Riley Wilson	Fr
OL	78	Nickolas Molina	Sr
WR	80	Dylan Herman	So
TE	81	Ayden Passley	Fr
WR	83	Malik Penson	Fr
WR	84	Barrett Schulz	Fr
TE	87	Remy Goins	Fr
TE	88	Kevin Schaeffer	GS
TE	89	Sean Burke	Fr

Defense

Pos.	#	Name	Class
DB	0	Da'Vontae Floyd	So
DB	1	Shamir Sterlin	So
DB	2	DeAndre Boykins	Sr
DB	3	Demetrius Hill	Sr
DB	4	Wesley Miller	Sr
DL	5	Kenton Simmons	Sr
DB	6	Lawrence Johnson	Jr
DB	7	Jai-Ayviauynn Celestine	Sr
DB	8	Ryan Gadson	Jr
LB	9	Josiah Taylor	Jr
DB	10	Ormond Wallace	Sr
LB	11	Percy Courtney Jr.	Sr
DL	12	RJ Moss Jr.	Jr
DL	13	Dante Anderson	Sr
DL	14	Robert Williams	So
DL	15	Nathan Jennings	So
DL	16	Nick Watson	Sr
LB	17	Kani Smith	So
LB	18	Pickle Stewart	So
DB	19	Myles Cunningham	So
DB	20	Kiyante Ingram	Fr
DB	21	Karaijus Hayes	Fr
LB	22	Brayshawn Littlejohn	Jr
DB	23	Tyderick Brown	Fr
DL	24	King Massey	Fr
DB	25	Jakari Johnson	Fr
DB	26	Zay West	Fr
DB	27	Eric Johnson	Fr
LB	28	Orlando Syph-Timmons	Jr
DB	29	Dominic Turnbull	Fr
LB	31	Demitris Mincey	Fr
DB	32	Jaeden McMillan	Fr
DL	33	DeeJay Holmes Jr.	Jr
LB	34	Cam Davis	Fr
DB	35	Jahmani Chin-Suer	Fr
LB	37	De'andre Arnold	Fr
DL	44	Michael Smarts	Fr
DL	45	Lamont Green Jr.	Jr
DL	48	Richard Nwaukoni	Sr
DL	55	Jamorie Flagg	So
DL	88	Elijah Simmons	Sr
DL	90	Anthony Cunningham	Sr
DL	91	Kyrie Samuel	Sr
DL	92	Lukenson Morancy	Fr
DL	95	Anthony Smith	So
DL	97	Elisha Baldridge	Jr
DL	99	Germaine Carter	Jr

Special teams

Pos.	#	Name	Class
P, K	30	Noah Sidan	Fr
P	41	Stone Springman	Jr
P	43	Felix Visser	Fr
LS	46	Holden Harkins	Fr
LS	47	Justin Wood	Jr
K	48	Robert Czeremcha	So
P	49	Conrad Tolerico	Fr
LS	86	Rodrigo Marron	Fr

Head coach

- Willie Simmons (head coach)

Coordinators/assistant coaches

- Nick Coleman (offensive coordinator / quarterbacks)
- Jovan Dewitt (defensive coordinator)
- Kenneth Gilstrap (special teams coordinator / safeties)
- Frank Ponce (tight ends)
- Ryan Smith (linebackers)
- Anthony Gaitor (cornerbacks)
- Jelani Berassa (wide receivers)
- Benedick Hyppolite (running backs)
- Edwin Pata (offensive line)
- Joe Cauthen (defensive line)
- Bryan Crawford (analyst)
- Ayeobele Randolph (analyst)

Legend

- (C) Team captain
- (S) Suspended
- (I) Ineligible
- Injured
- Redshirt

Roster
Last update: August 14, 2026
