= Taylor Housewright =

American football coach

Current position
- Title: Offensive coordinator and Quarterbacks coach
- Team: Jacksonville State
- Conference: CUSA

Playing career
- 2009–2012: Ashland
- Position: Quarterback

Coaching career (HC unless noted)
- 2013–2014: Miami (OH) (GA)
- 2015: Wittenberg (WR)
- 2016–2017: Ashland (WR)
- 2018: Wyoming (GA)
- 2019: Mississippi State (OQC)
- 2020: Oregon (OA)
- 2021–2023: Montana State (OC/QB)
- 2024: Georgia Southern (SOA)
- 2025: Jacksonville State (TE)
- 2026–present: Jacksonville State (OC/QB)

Taylor Housewright is an American football coach and former player who is the Offensive Coordinator and Quarterbacks coach for the Jacksonville State Gamecocks football team.

== Playing career ==
Housewright grew up in Ashland, Ohio and attended Ashland High School, where he played basketball and football. As a senior, he passed for 3,528 yards and 36 touchdowns and also rushed for 818 yards and 14 touchdowns.

Housewright played college football at Ashland University. He was a three-year starter at quarterback for the Ashland Eagles. Housewright was named the Great Lakes Intercollegiate Athletic Conference Player of the Year and was a finalist for the Harlon Hill Trophy after completing 241-of-358 pass attempts for 3,071 yards and 32 touchdowns as a senior. After his senior year at Ashland, Housewright took part in a rookie minicamp with the Cincinnati Bengals on a tryout basis but was not offered a contract.

== Coaching career ==
Housewright began his coaching career as a graduate assistant at Miami (OH) in 2013. He was hired as the wide receivers coach at Wittenberg after two seasons. Housewright returned to Ashland in 2016 as wide receivers coach. He moved on to Wyoming as a graduate assistant after two seasons and was hired as an offensive quality control coach at Mississippi State in 2019 by head coach Joe Moorhead.

After Moorhead was fired at the end of the season and subsequently hired as the offensive coordinator at Oregon, Housewright was hired as an offensive analyst for the Ducks. He was hired as the offensive coordinator and quarterbacks coach at Montana State after one season at Oregon. The Bobcats advanced to the 2022 NCAA Division I Football Championship Game in Housewright's first season, losing 38–10 to North Dakota State.
