= Jacksonville State–Kennesaw State football rivalry =

American college football rivalry

- Jacksonville State Gamecocks Kennesaw State Owls
- First meeting: December 2, 2017; Kennesaw State, 17–7
- Latest meeting: October 7, 2026; Jacksonville State, 27–26
- Next meeting: TBA 2027
- Stadiums: AmFirst Stadium; Fifth Third Stadium

Statistics
- Total meetings: 8
- All-time series: Tied, 4–4
- Largest victory: Jacksonville State, 63–24 (2024)
- Longest win streak: Jacksonville State, 3 (2022–2025); Kennesaw State, 3 (2017–2021)
- Current win streak: Jacksonville State, 1 (2026)

Locations of Jacksonville State and Kennesaw State

The Jacksonville State–Kennesaw State football rivalry, colloquially and unofficially known as Uncompromised Hate, is an American college football rivalry between the Jacksonville State Gamecocks of Jacksonville State University and the Kennesaw State Owls of Kennesaw State University. The two teams first played in 2017 and have played annually since 2024, when Kennesaw State joined Jacksonville State in Conference USA. The series is tied 4–4.

== History ==
In February 2013, the State Board of Regents voted to approve a new football program at Kennesaw State after years of planning, with a planned start in the 2015 season as a member of the Division I Football Championship Subdivision (FCS). Jacksonville State, on the other hand, already had a long history of playing football, having begun its program in 1904.

In 2015, Kennesaw State played its first season of football as an affiliate member of the Big South Conference.

=== 2010s ===
The first ever meeting between the two programs came in the second round of the 2017 FCS Playoffs. The Gamecocks entered the playoffs having finished No. 2 in the final 2017 FCS Rankings of the regular season after winning the Ohio Valley Conference (OVC). As a result, the Gamecocks were the No. 3 overall seed for the playoffs, which gave them a first round bye. Kennesaw State, in only its third year of football, went undefeated in the Big South and finished the regular season No. 18 in the rankings. The Owls did not receive a seed in the playoffs and played Samford in the first round. Upon defeating Samford at home, the Owls traveled to Jacksonville to face the Gamecocks for the first time. In what would be a low scoring affair, the Owls upset the Gamecocks 17–7 on their home field to advance to the quarterfinals.

Prior to the start of the 2017 season, it was announced that the Gamecocks and Owls would meet to conclude the 2018 regular season at SunTrust Park in Atlanta, Georgia for the first ever football game in the new home of the Atlanta Braves. As a result of the stunning outcome in the previous season’s playoffs and the strong seasons both teams were having, hype built for the November 17 showdown. Entering the match, the Owls were ranked No. 2 in the 2018 FCS Rankings, with the Gamecocks not far behind at No. 8. Due to the seasons both teams were having, the game was picked up for broadcast by Fox Sports. The game did not disappoint, as the Gamecocks led 14–10 at halftime. With just over a minute left in regulation, Owls quarterback Chandler Burks ran in a 1-yard touchdown to tie the score at 24–24. The Gamecocks did not answer, sending the game into overtime. The contest went to an astounding five overtime periods, with the Owls prevailing 60–52 in what some called an instant classic for the crowd of just under 17,000 spectators.

=== 2020s ===
In the winter of 2021, both Jacksonville State and Kennesaw State announced they would be leaving their respective conferences and joining the ASUN Conference, with the Gamecocks joining for the 2021 season and the Owls following in 2022. Following a three year hiatus in the series, the Gamecocks and Owls met in October 2021 in Kennesaw. The game was not close, as the Owls won 31–6 at home.

A month following the 2021 meeting, Jacksonville State surprisingly announced its plans to leave the ASUN after joining earlier that year. The Gamecocks declared their intention to move the football program from the FCS to the Division I Football Bowl Subdivision (FBS) and join Conference USA.

The meeting in 2022 was the first between the two programs as conference foes, with Kennesaw State joining the ASUN. The game was played in October in Alabama, with the Owls leading 21–10 at halftime. It appeared the Owls were once again on their way to defeat the Gamecocks for the fourth consecutive time and leave Jacksonville State winless in the series. However, the Gamecocks took the lead at 28–21 in the third quarter. The Owls scored again with 1:21 left in regulation to force the second overtime game of the series. Unlike the previous overtime thriller that lasted five periods, this one lasted only one, with the Gamecocks converting and the Owls failing to do so, sealing a 35–28 victory for Jacksonville State and its first win over the Owls.

Shortly after the 2022 meeting, Kennesaw State announced that it too would be transitioning its program from the FCS to the FBS level, following Jacksonville State as fellow members of Conference USA.

In 2024, the two met once again, this time as fellow FBS conference members. Both programs were having poor starts to the season. Jacksonville State entered the contest at 1–3 after a trouncing of Southern Miss for its first win, while Kennesaw State was winless. The match was not close. The Gamecocks leaned on their run game and handled the Owls 63–24 for the most lopsided win of the series by either team. Jacksonville State used the spark of its two game winning streak to go on a run, finishing the regular season 8–4 and defeating Western Kentucky for its first Conference USA championship.

Jacksonville State and Kennesaw State would meet not once but twice in 2025. The first meeting in November was a hyped matchup not seen in quite a while in the series. Leading up to the game, fans of both teams on X held a poll on what to call the rivalry. In a close vote, "Uncompromised Hate" came out victorious. The Kennesaw State school newspaper The Sentinel would later adopt the moniker when discussing the upcoming meeting in Alabama. The Gamecocks entered the contest at 6–3 while the Owls entered at 7–2, with both programs undefeated in conference play and jockeying for position to reach the conference title game. Leading up to the game, it was announced that the matchup would be televised nationally on ESPNU. The Gamecocks took the lead in the second quarter and never looked back, winning by a final score of 35–26 and putting them comfortably in the driver's seat of the conference as the favorites to repeat as champions.

Both the Gamecocks and Owls met in the Conference USA championship game for the 2025 season, with the Gamecocks looking to repeat as conference champions and the Owls looking to play spoiler again, just as in their first ever matchup back in 2017. Unlike the meeting in November, the championship game was a low scoring affair, with the Gamecocks leading late. However, Kennesaw State quarterback Amari Odom connected with wide receiver Navelle Dean with just over a minute left to take the lead. The Gamecocks could not answer, resulting in Kennesaw State winning its first ever Conference USA title and snapping their three game skid against the Gamecocks, 19–15.

Jacksonville State played their 8th meeting with Kennesaw State on October 7, 2026, in Kennesaw, Georgia, after losing in the previous season’s Conference USA championship game. Jacksonville State was heading into the game with a 3–2 record whereas Kennesaw State, who was the defending conference champion, had a 1–3 record. Kennesaw State went ahead 16–14 at halftime and expanded their lead to 23–14 late in the third quarter. But Jacksonville State stormed back with ten unanswered points and held a 24–23 lead in the fourth quarter. Kennesaw State took the lead with 2:17 left in the game after Daniel Kinney kicked a 28–yard field goal. After that, Kennesaw State allowed Jacksonville State to extend their possession because of a defensive holding call on fourth down which resulted in a 33–yard field goal by Garrison Rippa with 57 seconds left. The final comeback attempt for Kennesaw State failed as Jacksonville State defensive back Rob Billings IV picked off quarterback Rickie Collins with 19 seconds left to give Jacksonville State a 27–26 win.

== Game results ==
Jacksonville State victories	Kennesaw State victories

No.	Date	Location	Winning team		Losing team	
1	December 2, 2017	Jacksonville, AL	#18 Kennesaw State	17	#2 Jacksonville State	10
2	November 11, 2018	Atlanta, GA	#2 Kennesaw State	60	#6 Jacksonville State	52^{5OT}
3	October 2, 2021	Kennesaw, GA	#20 Kennesaw State	31	#17 Jacksonville State	6
4	October 1, 2022	Jacksonville, AL	Jacksonville State	35	Kennesaw State	28^{OT}
5	October 4, 2024	Kennesaw, GA	Jacksonville State	63	Kennesaw State	24

No.	Date	Location	Winning team		Losing team	
6	November 15, 2025	Jacksonville, AL	Jacksonville State	35	Kennesaw State	26
7	December 5, 2025	Jacksonville, AL	Kennesaw State	19	Jacksonville State	15
8	October 7, 2026	Kennesaw, GA	Jacksonville State	27	Kennesaw State	26
Series: Tied 4–4

== Coaching records ==
Jacksonville State
John Grass	0–3
Rich Rodriguez	2–0
Charles Kelly	2–1

Kennesaw State
Brian Bohannon	3–2
Jerry Mack	1–2

== See also ==
- List of NCAA college football rivalry games
