= Brock Glenn =

American football player

- Glenn in 2026

No. 11 – Western Kentucky Hilltoppers
- Position: Quarterback
- Class: Redshirt Junior

Personal information
- Listed height: 6 ft 2 in (1.88 m)
- Listed weight: 215 lb (98 kg)

Career information
- High school: Lausanne Collegiate School (Memphis, Tennessee)
- College: Florida State (2023–2025); Western Kentucky (2026–present)
- Stats at ESPN

Auburn Brock Glenn is an American college football quarterback for the Western Kentucky Hilltoppers. He previously played for the Florida State Seminoles.

== Career ==
Glenn attended Lausanne Collegiate School in Memphis, Tennessee. During his high school career he had 3,928 passing yards with 57 touchdowns and 1,654 rushing yards with 11 touchdowns. He originally committed to play college football at Ohio State University before switching to Florida State University to play college football.

Glenn began his true freshman season as a third-string behind Jordan Travis and Tate Rodemaker. After injuries to Travis and Rodemaker, Glenn started his first career game in the 2023 ACC Championship Game.

=== Statistics ===
Year	Team	Games			Passing								Rushing			
Year	Team	GP	GS	Record	Comp	Att	Pct	Yards	Avg	TD	Int	Rate	Att	Yards	Avg	TD
2023	Florida State	5	2	1−1	19	51	37.3	229	4.5	0	2	67.1	19	22	1.2	1
2024	Florida State	7	5	0−5	51	114	44.7	597	5.2	4	5	91.5	35	97	2.8	0
2025	Florida State	4	0	—	6	10	60.0	69	6.9	2	0	184.0	7	43	6.1	0
2026	Western Kentucky	7	2	1−1	67	128	52.3	663	5.2	5	2	105.7	74	322	4.4	5
Career		22	9	2−7	143	303	47.2	1,558	5.1	11	9	96.4	135	484	3.6	6
