= Rickie Collins =

American football player (born 2005)

No. 1 – Kennesaw State Owls
- Position: Quarterback
- Class: Redshirt Junior

Personal information
- Born: May 17, 2005 (age 21)
- Listed height: 6 ft 2 in (1.88 m)
- Listed weight: 222 lb (101 kg)

Career information
- High school: Woodlawn (Baton Rouge, Louisiana)
- College: LSU (2023–2024); Syracuse (2025); Kennesaw State (2026–present)
- Stats at ESPN

Rickie Collins (born May 17, 2005) is an American college football quarterback for the Kennesaw State Owls. He previously played for the LSU Tigers and Syracuse Orange.

== Early life ==
Collins attended Woodlawn High School in East Baton Rouge Parish, Louisiana. As a junior, he threw for 1,930 yards and 16 touchdowns while completing 65 percent of passes, earning District MVP honors. Coming out of high school, Collins was rated as a four-star recruit, the 12th overall player in Louisiana, the 13th best quarterback, and the 177th overall player in the class of 2023 and received offers from schools such as Florida State, Penn State, Purdue, and LSU. Collins committed to play for the LSU Tigers after de-committing from his original pick, Purdue.

== College career ==
=== LSU ===
In two seasons at LSU in 2023 and 2024, Collins completed all seven of his pass attempts for 38 yards and rushed for 37 yards on seven carries. After the 2024 season, he entered his name into the NCAA transfer portal.

=== Syracuse ===
Collins transferred to play for the Syracuse Orange and beat out Michael Johnson Jr. and Jakhari Williams for the starting role in 2025. Afterwards, he lost the starting role to Steve Angeli, but regained it when Angeli suffered a season-ending injury.

=== Kennesaw State ===
After the 2025 season, Collins announced he was transferring to play for the Kennesaw State Owls, replacing Amari Odom, who transferred to play for the Syracuse Orange.

=== Statistics ===
| Season | Team | Games | | | Passing | | | | | | | | Rushing | | | |
| Season | Team | GP | GS | Record | Cmp | Att | Pct | Yds | Y/A | TD | Int | Rtg | Att | Yds | Avg | TD |
|---|---|---|---|---|---|---|---|---|---|---|---|---|---|---|---|---|
| 2023 | LSU | 1 | 0 | — | 2 | 2 | 100.0 | 3 | 1.5 | 0 | 0 | 112.6 | 3 | 19 | 6.3 | 0 |
| 2024 | LSU | 3 | 0 | — | 5 | 5 | 100.0 | 35 | 7.0 | 0 | 0 | 158.8 | 4 | 18 | 4.5 | 0 |
| 2025 | Syracuse | 7 | 5 | 0–5 | 97 | 181 | 53.6 | 1,042 | 5.8 | 6 | 10 | 101.8 | 54 | 126 | 2.3 | 1 |
| 2026 | Kennesaw State | 7 | 7 | 1–6 | 144 | 210 | 68.6 | 1,426 | 6.8 | 4 | 5 | 116.0 | 72 | 295 | 4.1 | 5 |
| Career | | 18 | 12 | 1–11 | 248 | 398 | 62.3 | 2,506 | 6.3 | 10 | 15 | 116.0 | 133 | 458 | 3.4 | 6 |
