= Caden Creel =

American football player

No. 12 – Jacksonville State Gamecocks
- Position: Quarterback
- Class: Senior

Personal information
- Listed height: 6 ft 0 in (1.83 m)
- Listed weight: 200 lb (91 kg)

Career information
- High school: Fairhope (Fairhope, Alabama)
- College: Jacksonville State (2023–present)

Awards and highlights
- 2025 Salute to Veterans Bowl MVP
- Stats at ESPN

Caden Creel is an American college football quarterback for the Jacksonville State Gamecocks.

== Early life ==
Creel attended Fairhope High School in Fairhope, Alabama. As a senior, he recorded 3,008 total yards, passing for 1,822 yards and rushing for 1,186 yards. Following his high school career, Creel committed to play college football at Jacksonville State University.

== College career ==
Creel redshirted in 2023 and did not see any playing time in 2024. After entering the 2025 season as the backup to Gavin Wimsatt, he eventually became the Gamecocks' starting quarterback. Creel made his first career start against Sam Houston, completing 13 of 17 passes for 129 yards, while also rushing for 132 yards and a touchdown in a 29–27 victory. He was named the Conference USA Offensive Player of the Week after totaling 204 passing yards and two touchdowns and 143 rushing yards and a rushing touchdown, leading the Gamecocks to a 37–34 win over Western Kentucky. In the 2025 Salute to Veterans Bowl, Creel completed 14 of 20 passes for 173 yards and a touchdown, being named the game's MVP.

=== Statistics ===
Season	Team	Games			Passing								Rushing			
Season	Team	GP	GS	Record	Cmp	Att	Pct	Yds	Avg	TD	Int	Rtg	Att	Yds	Avg	TD
2023	Jacksonville State	Redshirted (redshirt)														
2024	Jacksonville State	DNP														
2025	Jacksonville State	14	9	7–2	130	211	61.6	1,514	7.2	9	4	132.2	182	1,075	5.9	7
2026	Jacksonville State	9	9	7–2	158	237	66.7	1,987	8.4	15	8	151.2	139	800	5.8	6
Career		23	18	14−4	288	448	64.3	3,501	7.8	24	12	142.3	322	1,876	5.8	13
