= 2026 Texas A&M Aggies football team =

American college football season

2026 Texas A&M Aggies football
- Conference: Southeastern Conference
- Record: 4–7 (1–7 SEC)
- Head coach: Mike Elko (3rd season)
- Offensive coordinator: Holmon Wiggins (3rd (Note: Including two years as co-offensive coordinator) season)
- Offensive scheme: Pro spread
- Defensive coordinator: Lyle Hemphill (1st season)
- Co-defensive coordinator: Elijah Robinson (2nd season)
- Base defense: 4–2–5
- Home stadium: Kyle Field

2026 Southeastern Conference football standings
	Conf.			Overall
Team	W		L	W		L
No. 1 Georgia y	8	–	1	10	–	1
No. 5 Texas	6	–	2	9	–	2
No. 9 Tennessee	6	–	2	9	–	2
No. 3 Alabama	6	–	2	9	–	2
No. 22 Oklahoma	5	–	3	7	–	4
No. 24 Florida	5	–	4	7	–	4
No. 16 Kentucky	5	–	4	7	–	4
No. 25 Ole Miss	4	–	4	7	–	4
Auburn	4	–	4	7	–	4
Missouri	4	–	4	7	–	4
No. 21 South Carolina	4	–	5	6	–	5
LSU	3	–	5	6	–	5
Mississippi State	2	–	6	5	–	6
Arkansas	2	–	6	4	–	7
Texas A&M	1	–	7	4	–	7
Vanderbilt	1	–	7	4	–	7
Championship: Georgia vs TBD
^ – College Football Playoff participant; $ – Conference champion; y – Championship game participant; As of November 22, 2026; Rankings from CFP rankings

The 2026 Texas A&M Aggies football team represents Texas A&M University during the 2026 NCAA Division I FBS football season as a member of the Southeastern Conference (SEC). The Aggies are led by third-year head coach Mike Elko and play their home games at Kyle Field in College Station, Texas.

== Offseason ==
On December 4, 2025, offensive coordinator Collin Klein was hired as the head coach at Kansas State. Co-offensive coordinator and wide receivers coach Holmon Wiggins was later promoted to offensive coordinator.

On December 11, it was reported by the Austin American-Statesman that defensive coordinator Jay Bateman would be hired to the same position at Kentucky, though he would stay with the Aggies during their College Football Playoff run. It was also reported that assistant defensive coach Lyle Hemphill would be promoted to defensive coordinator, which was officially announced the following day. On December 22, Elijah Robinson was hired as defensive line coach and co-defensive coordinator.

=== Draft departures ===
Texas A&M players leaving for the NFL Draft
Name	Number	Pos.	Height	Weight	Year	Hometown
KC Concepcion	7	WR	5'-11" ft	190 lbs	Junior	Charlotte, NC
Chase Bisontis	71	G	6'-5" ft	315 lbs	Junior	Ramsey, NJ
Cashius Howell	9	DE	6'-2" ft	248 lbs	RS-Senior	Kansas City, MO
Nate Boerkircher	87	TE	6'-4" ft	250 lbs	Graduate	Aurora, NE
Tyler Onyedim	11	DT	6'-3" ft	295 lbs	Graduate	Richmond, TX
Albert Regis	17	DT	6'-1" ft	317 lbs	Graduate	La Porte, TX
Trey Zuhn III	60	C	6'-6" ft	319 lbs	Graduate	Fort Collins, CO
Will Lee III	4	CB	6'-1" ft	189 lbs	Senior	St. Louis, MO
Dametrious Crownover	76	T	6'-7" ft	336 lbs	Graduate	Grandview, TX
Ar'maj Reed-Adams	55	G	6'-5" ft	325 lbs	Graduate	Dallas, TX

== Preseason ==
Spring practice is scheduled to begin on March 20, culminating with the Maroon & White spring game on April 18.

== Schedule ==
Date	Time	Opponent	Rank	Site	TV	Result	Attendance
September 5	6:00 p.m.	Missouri State*	No. 8	Kyle Field; College Station, TX	ESPN	W 50–0	107,782
September 12	11:00 a.m.	Arizona State*	No. 10	Kyle Field; College Station, TX	ABC	W 48–20	107,523
September 19	2:30 p.m.	Kentucky	No. 9	Kyle Field; College Station, TX	ESPN	L 21–31	105,186
September 26	6:30 p.m.	at No. 10 LSU	No. 23	Tiger Stadium; Baton Rouge, LA (rivalry)	ABC	L 6–35	102,321
October 3	6:00 p.m.	Arkansas		Kyle Field; College Station, TX (rivalry)	ESPN2	W 34–7	108,657
October 10	11:00 a.m.	at No. 14 Missouri		Faurot Field; Columbia, MO	ABC	L 6–27	63,609
October 17	12:00 p.m.	The Citadel*		Kyle Field; College Station, TX	SECN+	W 41–0	101,052
October 24	2:30 p.m.	at No. 14 Alabama		Bryant–Denny Stadium; Tuscaloosa, AL	ABC	L 20–31	100,077
November 7	2:00 p.m.	at No. 21 South Carolina		Williams–Brice Stadium; Columbia, SC	ESPN	L 9–17	78,687
November 14	2:00 p.m.	No. 8 Tennessee		Kyle Field; College Station, TX	ESPN	L 7–22	108,504
November 21	2:45 p.m.	at No. 22 Oklahoma		Gaylord Family Oklahoma Memorial Stadium; Norman, OK	ESPN2	L 7–28	83,487
November 27	6:30 p.m.	Texas		Kyle Field; College Station, TX (Lone Star Showdown)	ABC		
*Non-conference game; Rankings from AP Poll (and CFP Rankings, after November 3) – Released prior to game; All times are in Central time; Source:

== Rankings ==
Ranking movements Legend: ██ Increase in ranking ██ Decrease in ranking — = Not ranked RV = Received votes
	Week															
Poll	Pre	1	2	3	4	5	6	7	8	9	10	11	12	13	14	Final
AP	8	10	9	23	—	—	—	—	—	—	—	—				
Coaches	8	9	8	20	RV	RV	—	—	—	—	—	—				
CFP	Not released									—	—	—				Not released

== Personnel ==
2026 Texas A&M Aggies football team roster
Players
Coaches
Offense

Pos.	#	Name	Class
RB	0	KJ Edwards	Fr
WR	1	Mario Craver	Jr
RB	2	Jamarion Morrow	So
WR	3	Aaron Gregory	Fr
RB	4	Rueben Owens	Jr
RB	5	Deondrae "Tiger" Riden Jr.	Fr
WR	6	Terry Bussey	Jr
WR	7	Isaiah Horton	GS
WR	8	Ashton Bethel-Roman	So
TE	9	Kiotti Armstrong	Fr
QB	10	Marcel Reed	Jr
WR	11	Kelshaun Johnson	Fr
QB	13	Brady Hart	Fr
QB	14	Eli Morcos	Fr
TE	15	Caleb Tafua	Fr
QB	16	Helaman Casuga	Fr
WR	17	Madden Williams	Fr
WR	18	TK Norman	Fr
QB	19	Paxton Land	So
TE	19	KK Johnson	Fr
WR	20	Mike Brown	Fr
RB	22	Carsyn Baker	Fr
RB	23	DD Murray	Fr
RB	24	Ramarian Tillman	So
WR	38	Whitaker Williams	So
TE	43	Carter Braugh	So
OL	50	Isendre Ahfua	So
OL	52	Blake Ivy	So
OL	54	Mark Nabou Jr.	GS
OL	55	Hunter McKinney	Fr
OL	56	Nelson McGuire	Fr
OL	62	Marcus Garcia	Fr
OL	64	Sam Roseborough	Fr
OL	65	Avery Morcho	Fr
OL	70	Robert Bourdon	So
OL	71	Tyree Adams	Jr
OL	72	Joshua Moses	Fr
OL	73	Ashton Funk	So
OL	74	Zaden Krempin	Fr
OL	75	Wilkin Formby	GS
OL	76	Trovon Baugh	GS
OL	77	Tyler Thomas	Fr
OL	78	Coen Echols	So
OL	79	Lamont Rogers	Fr
WR	80	Jerome Myles	Fr
TE	81	Luke Braden	So
WR	81	Jayden Warren	Fr
WR	82	Jonah Wilson	Jr
WR	83	Will Hargett	Fr
TE	84	Richie Anderson	Jr
WR	85	Chase Burton	Jr
TE	86	Evan Jacobson	Fr
TE	87	Houston Thomas	GS
TE	88	Micah Riley	Sr
WR	89	Kade Stewart	Fr

Defense

Pos.	#	Name	Class
LB	0	Noah Mikhail	So
DB	1	Bryce Anderson	GS
CB	2	Dezz Ricks	So
S	3	Marcus Ratcliffe	Sr
S	4	Tawfiq Byard	Jr
DT	5	D. J. Hicks	Sr
CB	6	Julian Humphrey	Sr
S	7	Dalton Brooks	Sr
CB	8	Jordan Shaw	Jr
CB	9	Rickey Gibson III	GS
DE	10	Marco Jones	So
DT	11	Brandon Davis-Swain	So
DL	12	Nana Boadi-Owusu	GS
S	13	Myles Davis	Jr
CB	13	Deyjhon Pettaway	Fr
DE	14	Anto Saka	GS
DL	15	Sam M'Pemba	Jr
S	15	Tylan Wilson	Fr
CB	16	Jamar Beal-Goines	Fr
DE	16	Bryce Perry-Wright	Fr
DE	17	Ryan Henderson	GS
DE	18	T. J. Searcy	Sr
DB	19	Bravion Rogers	Sr
CB	20	Adonyss Currie	Fr
LB	21	Ray Coney	Sr
CB	21	Vic Singleton	Fr
S	22	Rashad "Tom Tom" Johnson Jr.	Fr
DE	22	Tristian Givens	Fr
CB	23	Brandon Arrington	Fr
DB	24	Camren Hamiel	Fr
LB	25	Tamarion Watkins	Fr
S	26	Layne Gerke	So
LB	27	Daymion Sanford	Sr
S	28	Chance Collins	Fr
DB	29	Justin Echols	Sr
LB	30	TJ Smith	Jr
LB	31	Kelvion Riggins	Fr
LB	32	Tank King	Fr
LB	33	Storm Miller	Fr
LB	34	Kyle Garvis	So
S	37	Peyton Gay	So
DB	39	Adam Graham	So
DE	42	Kendall Jackson	So
LB	43	Jeremiah Searcy	Fr
LB	45	Tommy Colligan	Jr
LB	46	Qui Beck	Fr
LB	54	Jordan Lockhart	Jr
DE	55	Samu Moala	Fr
DT	59	Chace Sims	Fr
CB	86	Ryan Burtin	Jr
DT	88	DJ Sanders	Fr
DT	92	CJ Mims	Sr
DT	93	Nathan Mabon	Fr
DT	94	Angelo McCullom	Jr
DE	98	Jesse Chukwu	Sr
DT	98	Jermaine Kinsler	Fr
DT	99	Landon Rink	So

Special teams

Pos.	#	Name	Class
K	24	David Olano	GS
LS	31	Shea Freibaum	Jr
P	37	Tyler White	Jr
P	38	Jared White	Jr
LS	40	Gray Evans	Fr
LS	42	Jackson Graham	So
K	83	Colton Chmelar	Fr
K	90	Asher Murray	Fr
P	95	Alex Abbott	So
P	96	Waylon Peters	Fr

Head coach

- Mike Elko

Coordinators/assistant coaches

- Holmon Wiggins – Offensive coordinator
- Lyle Hemphill – Defensive coordinator
- Patrick Dougherty – Special teams coordinator
- Trooper Taylor – Associate head coach (offense)/running backs
- Travis Williams – Associate head coach (defense)/linebackers
- Elijah Robinson – Co-defensive coordinator/defensive linemen
- Ishmael Aristide – Safeties
- Adam Cushing – Run game coordinator/offensive linemen
- Bryant Gross-Armiento – Cornerbacks
- Tony Jerod-Eddie – Defensive tackles
- Joey Lynch – Quarterbacks
- John Perry – Wide receivers
- Derek Shay – Tight ends
- Stan Watson – Edges
- Paul Williams – Nickels
- Rich Skrosky – Senior offensive analyst
- Andrew Bather – Offensive analyst
- Brad Cornelsen – Offensive analyst
- Malik Davis – Defensive analyst
- Wisly Desire – Offensive analyst
- Jacob Gregory – Defensive analyst
- Joe Joe Headen – Defensive analyst
- Drew Hollingshead – Offensive analyst
- Darius Joiner – Defensive analyst
- Deveonte Mackey – Offensive analyst
- Denzel Nickerson – Offensive analyst
- Zach Sparber – Defensive analyst
- Tony Thompson – Special teams analyst

Legend

- (C) Team captain
- (S) Suspended
- (I) Ineligible
- Injured
- Redshirt

Roster
Last update: 6/19/26

== Game summaries ==
=== Missouri State ===
Missouri State Bears (0–0) at No. 8 Texas A&M Aggies (0–0) – Game summary

Quarter	1	2	3	4	Total
Bears	0	0	0	0	0
No. 8 Aggies	9	10	14	17	50

at Kyle Field • College Station, Texas

- Date: September 5
- Game time: 6:00 p.m. CDT
- Game weather: Cloudy • Temperature: 84 °F (29 °C) • Wind: NE at 18 miles per hour (29 km/h)
- Game attendance: 107,782
- Referee: Tim Barker
- TV announcers (ESPN): Lowell Galindo, Kirk Morrison, and Dawn Davenport

Game information

First quarter

- TA&M – Isaiah Horton 15-yard pass from Marcel Reed (David Olano kick), 9:32. Aggies 7–0. Drive: 8 plays, 58 yards, 4:05.
- TA&M – Team safety, 0:26. Aggies 9–0.

Second quarter

- TA&M – David Olano 28-yard field goal, 3:22. Aggies 12–0. Drive: 6 plays, 40 yards, 2:35.
- TA&M – Mario Craver 12-yard pass from Marcel Reed (David Olano kick), 0:29. Aggies 19–0. Drive: 5 plays, 23 yards, 2:11.

Third quarter

- TA&M – Terry Bussey 10-yard run (David Olano kick), 9:56. Aggies 26–0. Drive: 11 plays, 70 yards, 5:04.
- TA&M – Jamarion Morrow 2-yard run (David Olano kick), 2:09. Aggies 33–0. Drive: 14 plays, 71 yards, 6:41.

Fourth quarter

- TA&M – Carsyn Baker 12-yard run (David Olano kick), 13:35. Aggies 40–0. Drive: 4 plays, 54 yards, 1:57.
- TA&M – Aaron Gregory 15-yard pass from Brady Hart (David Olano kick), 12:52. Aggies 47–0. Drive: 1 play, 15 yards, 0:05.
- TA&M – Asher Murray 47-yard field goal, 4:04. Aggies 50–0. Drive: 12 plays, 56 yards, 5:16.

Statistics	MOST	TAMU
First downs	4	35
Plays–yards	40–67	65–505
Rushes–yards	23–37	47–236
Passing yards	30	269
Passing: comp–att–int	8–17–0	25–38–0
Turnovers	3	1
Time of possession	16:57	43:03

Team	Category	Player	Statistics
Missouri State	Passing	Skyler Locklear	8/17, 30 yards
Missouri State	Rushing	Breezy Dubar	7 carries, 20 yards
Missouri State	Receiving	Dillon Hipp	2 receptions, 15 yards
Texas A&M	Passing	Marcel Reed	21/30, 233 yards, 2 TD
Texas A&M	Rushing	Rueben Owens II	17 carries, 77 yards
Texas A&M	Receiving	Isaiah Horton	4 receptions, 76 yards, TD

=== Arizona State ===
Arizona State Sun Devils (1–0) at No. 10 Texas A&M Aggies (1–0) – Game summary

Quarter	1	2	3	4	Total
Sun Devils	7	3	10	0	20
No. 10 Aggies	7	10	7	24	48

at Kyle Field • College Station, Texas

- Date: September 12
- Game time: 11:00 a.m. CDT
- Game weather: Sunny • Temperature: 87 °F (31 °C) • Wind: S at 13 miles per hour (21 km/h)
- Game attendance: 107,523
- Referee: Stephen Baron
- TV announcers (ABC): Tom Hart, Jesse Palmer, and Kris Budden

Game information

First quarter

- TA&M – Rueben Owens II 2-yard run (David Olano kick), 4:55. Aggies 7–0. Drive: 2 plays, 8 yards, 0:58.
- ASU – Reed Harris 21-yard pass from Cutter Boley (Carson Smith kick), 0:21. Tied 7–7. Drive: 11 plays, 75 yards, 4:34.

Second quarter

- TA&M – Isaiah Horton 4-yard pass from Marcel Reed (David Olano kick), 9:15. Aggies 14–7. Drive: 13 plays, 75 yards, 6:06.
- ASU – Carson Smith 30-yard field goal, 6:15. Aggies 14–10. Drive: 8 plays, 62 yards, 3:00.
- TA&M – David Olano 22-yard field goal, 0:03. Aggies 17–10. Drive: 8 plays, 38 yards, 2:20.

Third quarter

- ASU – Carson Smith 35-yard field goal, 10:19. Aggies 17–13. Drive: 9 plays, 38 yards, 4:33.
- TA&M – Isaiah Horton 13-yard pass from Marcel Reed (David Olano kick), 5:53. Aggies 24–13. Drive: 8 plays, 75 yards, 4:26.
- ASU – Reed Harris 58-yard pass from Cutter Boley (Carson Smith kick), 3:39. Aggies 24–20. Drive: 5 plays, 75 yards, 2:14.

Fourth quarter

- TA&M – Mario Craver 33-yard pass from Marcel Reed (David Olano kick), 14:20. Aggies 31–20. Drive: 3 plays, 44 yards, 0:59.
- TA&M – Marco Jones 55-yard interception return (David Olano kick), 8:38. Aggies 38–20.
- TA&M – David Olano 39-yard field goal, 5:58. Aggies 41–20. Drive: 4 plays, 4 yards, 2:25.
- TA&M – Julio Humphrey 45-yard interception return (David Olano kick), 4:25. Aggies 48–20.

Statistics	ASU	TAMU
First downs	16	14
Plays–yards	63–369	60–255
Rushes–yards	29–115	35–92
Passing yards	254	163
Passing: comp–att–int	21–34–2	15–25–1
Turnovers	4	1
Time of possession	30:04	29:56

Team	Category	Player	Statistics
Arizona State	Passing	Cutter Boley	21/34, 254 yards, 2 TD, 2 INT
Arizona State	Rushing	Kyson Brown	13 carries, 66 yards
Arizona State	Receiving	Reed Harris	9 receptions, 189 yards, 2 TD
Texas A&M	Passing	Marcel Reed	15/25, 163 yards, 3 TD, INT
Texas A&M	Rushing	Rueben Owens II	10 carries, 35 yards, TD
Texas A&M	Receiving	Terry Bussey	4 receptions, 58 yards

=== Kentucky ===
Kentucky Wildcats (1–1) at No. 9 Texas A&M Aggies (2–0) – Game summary

Quarter	1	2	3	4	Total
Wildcats	0	7	21	3	31
No. 9 Aggies	0	7	0	14	21

at Kyle Field • College Station, Texas

- Date: September 19
- Game time: 2:30 p.m. CDT
- Game weather: Sunny • Temperature: 96 °F (36 °C) • Wind: N at 5 miles per hour (8.0 km/h)
- Game attendance: 105,186
- Referee: James Carter
- TV announcers (ESPN): Joe Tessitore, Jesse Palmer and Kris Budden

Statistics	UK	TAMU
First downs	18	23
Plays–yards	54–408	84–423
Rushes–yards	36–255	35–187
Passing yards	252	236
Passing: comp–att–int	14–18–0	26–49–2
Turnovers	0	2
Time of possession	29:35	30:25

Team	Category	Player	Statistics
Kentucky	Passing	Kenny Minchey	14/18, 252 yards, 2 TD
Kentucky	Rushing	CJ Baxter	19 carries, 87 yards, 2 TD
Kentucky	Receiving	DJ Miller	5 receptions, 96 yards
Texas A&M	Passing	Marcel Reed	26/49, 236 yards, TD, INT
Texas A&M	Rushing	Marcel Reed	10 carries, 80 yards, TD
Texas A&M	Receiving	Mario Craver	11 receptions, 119 yards

=== At No. 10 LSU ===
No. 23 Texas A&M Aggies (2–1) at No. 10 LSU Tigers (2–1) – Game summary

Quarter	1	2	3	4	Total
No. 23 Aggies	0	3	3	0	6
No. 10 Tigers	7	7	21	0	35

at Tiger Stadium • Baton Rouge, Louisiana

- Date: September 26
- Game time: 6:30 p.m. CDT
- Game weather: Cloudy • Temperature: 87 °F (31 °C) • Wind: SE at 2 miles per hour (3.2 km/h)
- Game attendance: 102,321
- Referee: Jason Autrey
- TV announcers (ABC): Joe Tessitore, Jesse Palmer, and Kris Budden

Statistics	TAMU	LSU
First downs	11	20
Plays–yards	60–197	66–506
Rushes–yards	33–91	38–194
Passing yards	106	312
Passing: comp–att–int	10–27–2	17–28–1
Turnovers	2	1
Time of possession	29:39	30:21

Team	Category	Player	Statistics
Texas A&M	Passing	Marcel Reed	10/26, 106 yards, INT
Texas A&M	Rushing	Rueben Owens II	11 carries, 62 yards
Texas A&M	Receiving	Isaiah Horton	3 receptions, 43 yards
LSU	Passing	Sam Leavitt	17/23, 312 yards, 2 TD, INT
LSU	Rushing	Dilin Jones	14 carries, 63 yards, TD
LSU	Receiving	Jackson Harris	6 receptions, 163 yards, 2 TD

=== Arkansas ===
Arkansas Razorbacks (2–2) at Texas A&M Aggies (2–2) – Game summary

Quarter	1	2	3	4	Total
Razorbacks	7	0	0	0	7
Aggies	14	10	7	3	34

at Kyle Field • College Station, Texas

- Date: October 3
- Game time: 6:00 p.m. CDT
- Game weather: Rain • Temperature: 78 °F (26 °C) • Wind: N 11 mph
- Game attendance: 108,657
- Referee: Tim Barker
- TV announcers (ESPN2): Lowell Galindo, Kirk Morrison, and Dawn Davenport

Game information
First quarter
- TAMU – Carsyn Baker 2-yard run (David Olano kick), 9:27. Aggies 7–0. Drive: 8 plays, 28 yards, 4:12.
- TAMU – KJ Edwards 20-yard run (David Olano kick), 3:00. Aggies 14–0. Drive: 10 plays, 78 yards, 5:40.
- ARK – Chris Marshall 26-yard pass from KJ Jackson (Max Gilbert kick), 0:24. Aggies 14–7. Drive: 6 plays, 75 yards, 2:36.

Second quarter

- TAMU – Marcel Reed 1-yard run (David Olano kick), 2:22. Aggies 21–7. Drive: 13 plays, 63 yards, 8:12.
- TAMU – David Olano 57-yard field goal, 0:02. Aggies 24–7. Drive: 7 plays, 33 yards, 1:58.

Third quarter

- TAMU – KJ Edwards 3-yard run (David Olano kick), 12:42. Aggies 31–7. Drive: 4 plays, 75 yards, 2:18.

Fourth quarter

- TAMU – David Olano 50-yard field goal, 14:50. Aggies 34–7. Drive: 9 plays, 65 yards, 5:38.

Statistics	ARK	TAMU
First downs	14	23
Plays–yards	47–214	68–401
Rushes–yards	22–103	49–231
Passing yards	111	170
Passing: comp–att–int	13–25–1	13–19–0
Turnovers	1	0
Time of possession	21:52	38:08

Team	Category	Player	Statistics
Arkansas	Passing	KJ Jackson	13/25, 111 yards, TD, INT
Arkansas	Rushing	Sutton Smith	6 carries, 41 yards
Arkansas	Receiving	Chris Marshall	7 receptions, 76 yards, TD
Texas A&M	Passing	Marcel Reed	13/19, 170 yards
Texas A&M	Rushing	KJ Edwards	11 carries, 66 yards, 2 TD
Texas A&M	Receiving	Kiotti Armstrong	1 reception, 54 yards

=== At No. 14 Missouri ===
Texas A&M Aggies (3–2) at No. 14 Missouri Tigers (4–1) – Game summary

Quarter	1	2	3	4	Total
Aggies	3	0	0	3	6
No. 14 Tigers	0	10	10	7	27

at Faurot Field • Columbia, Missouri

- Date: October 10
- Game time: 11:00 a.m. CDT
- Game weather: Sunny • Temperature: 76 °F (24 °C) • Wind: S 7 mph
- Game attendance: 63,609
- Referee: Steve Marlowe
- TV announcers (ABC): Bob Wischusen, Louis Riddick, and Stormy Buonantony

Game information
First quarter
- TAMU – David Olano 53-yard field goal, 4:46. Aggies 3–0. Drive: 4 plays, 5 yards, 2:04.

Second quarter

- MIZ – Cayden Lee 32-yard pass from Austin Simmons (Blake Craig kick), 12:58. Tigers 7–3. Drive: 10 plays, 77 yards, 4:19.
- MIZ – Blake Craig 50-yard field goal, 8:40. Tigers 10–3. Drive: 4 plays, 2 yards, 1:22.

Third quarter

- MIZ – Blake Craig 51-yard field goal, 12:30. Tigers 13–3. Drive: 7 plays, 42 yards, 2:30.
- MIZ – Jamal Roberts 2-yard run (Blake Craig kick), 0:00. Tigers 20–3. Drive: 12 plays, 76 yards, 6:51.

Fourth quarter

- TAMU – David Olano 27-yard field goal, 9:51. Tigers 20–6. Drive: 12 plays, 45 yards, 5:09.
- MIZ – Jamal Roberts 54-yard run (Blake Craig kick), 2:49. Tigers 27–6. Drive: 2 plays, 57 yards, 0:14.

Statistics	TAMU	MIZ
First downs	10	20
Plays–yards	62–216	72–399
Rushes–yards	23–29	44–252
Passing yards	187	147
Passing: comp–att–int	19–39–2	14–28–1
Turnovers	2	1
Time of possession	28:48	31:12

Team	Category	Player	Statistics
Texas A&M	Passing	Marcel Reed	19/39, 187 yards, 2 INT
Texas A&M	Rushing	KJ Edwards	6 carries, 20 yards
Texas A&M	Receiving	TK Norman	3 receptions, 55 yards
Missouri	Passing	Austin Simmons	14/28, 147 yards, TD, INT
Missouri	Rushing	Jamal Roberts	34 carries, 222 yards, 2 TD
Missouri	Receiving	Cayden Lee	7 receptions, 94 yards, TD

=== The Citadel (FCS) ===
The Citadel Bulldogs (FCS) (2–4) at Texas A&M Aggies (3–3) – Game summary

Quarter	1	2	3	4	Total
Bulldogs (FCS)	0	0	0	0	0
Aggies	7	21	6	7	41

at Kyle Field • College Station, Texas

- Date: October 17
- Game time: 12:00 p.m. CDT
- Game weather: Sunny • Temperature: 61 °F (16 °C) • Wind: NE 10 mph
- Game attendance: 101,052
- Referee: James Carter
- TV announcers (SECN+): Richard Cross and Charlie Strong

Statistics	CIT	TAMU
First downs	12	26
Plays–yards	57–183	65–501
Rushes–yards	47–140	40–264
Passing yards	43	237
Passing: comp–att–int	3–10–0	16–25–0
Turnovers	0	0
Time of possession	33:59	26:01

Team	Category	Player	Statistics
The Citadel	Passing	Nick Billoups	2/5, 38 yards
The Citadel	Rushing	Gavin Garcia	16 carries, 46 yards
The Citadel	Receiving	Isaiah Jonson	1 reception, 32 yards
Texas A&M	Passing	Marcel Reed	8/13, 130 yards, TD
Texas A&M	Rushing	KJ Edwards	13 carries, 116 yards
Texas A&M	Receiving	Aaron Gregory	6 receptions, 94 yards, 2 TD

=== At No. 13 Alabama ===
Texas A&M Aggies (4–3) at No. 13 Alabama Crimson Tide (5–2) – Game summary

Quarter	1	2	3	4	Total
Aggies	7	10	3	0	20
No. 13 Crimson Tide	10	7	0	14	31

at Bryant–Denny Stadium • Tuscaloosa, Alabama

- Date: October 24
- Game time: 2:30 p.m. CDT
- Game weather: Sunny • Temperature: 76 °F (24 °C) • Wind: SW 7 miles per hour (11 km/h)
- Game attendance: 100,077
- Referee: Adam Savoie
- TV announcers (ABC): Joe Tessitore, Jesse Palmer, and Kris Budden

Statistics	TAMU	ALA
First downs	18	20
Plays–yards	61–278	58–379
Rushes–yards	40–115	28–68
Passing yards	163	311
Passing: comp–att–int	14–21–2	19–30–1
Turnovers	3	1
Time of possession	33:10	26:50

Team	Category	Player	Statistics
Texas A&M	Passing	Marcel Reed	14/21, 163 yards, TD, 2 INT
Texas A&M	Rushing	KJ Edwards	8 carries, 43 yards
Texas A&M	Receiving	Mario Craver	6 receptions, 45 yards, TD
Alabama	Passing	Keelon Russell	19/30, 311 yards, 3 TD, INT
Alabama	Rushing	Daniel Hill	9 carries, 36 yards
Alabama	Receiving	Rico Scott	6 receptions, 156 yards

=== At No. 21 South Carolina ===
Texas A&M Aggies (4–4) at No. 21 South Carolina Gamecocks (5–3) – Game summary

Quarter	1	2	Total
Aggies			0
No. 21 Gamecocks			0

at Williams–Brice Stadium • Columbia, South Carolina

- Date: November 7
- TV announcers (ESPN): Roy Philpott, Brock Osweiler, and Stormy Buonantony

Statistics	TAMU	SC
First downs		
Plays–yards		
Rushes–yards		
Passing yards		
Passing: comp–att–int		
Time of possession		

Team	Category	Player	Statistics
Texas A&M	Passing		
Texas A&M	Rushing		
Texas A&M	Receiving		
South Carolina	Passing		
South Carolina	Rushing		
South Carolina	Receiving		

=== No. 8 Tennessee ===
No. 8 Tennessee Volunteers (7–2) at Texas A&M Aggies (4–5) – Game summary

Quarter	1	2	Total
No. 8 Volunteers			0
Aggies			0

at Kyle Field • College Station, Texas

- Date: November 14
- TV announcers (ESPN): Dave Pasch, Dusty Dvoracek, and Taylor McGregor

Statistics	TENN	TAMU
First downs		
Plays–yards		
Rushes–yards		
Passing yards		
Passing: comp–att–int		
Time of possession		

Team	Category	Player	Statistics
Tennessee	Passing		
Tennessee	Rushing		
Tennessee	Receiving		
Texas A&M	Passing		
Texas A&M	Rushing		
Texas A&M	Receiving		

=== At No. 22 Oklahoma ===
Texas A&M Aggies (4–6) at No. 22 Oklahoma Sooners (6–4) – Game summary

Quarter	1	2	Total
Aggies			0
No. 22 Sooners			0

at Gaylord Family Oklahoma Memorial Stadium • Norman, Oklahoma

- Date: November 21

Statistics	TAMU	OU
First downs		
Plays–yards		
Rushes–yards		
Passing yards		
Passing: comp–att–int		
Time of possession		

Team	Category	Player	Statistics
Texas A&M	Passing		
Texas A&M	Rushing		
Texas A&M	Receiving		
Oklahoma	Passing		
Oklahoma	Rushing		
Oklahoma	Receiving		

=== Texas (Lone Star Showdown) ===
Texas Longhorns (0–0) at Texas A&M Aggies (0–0) – Game summary

Quarter	1	2	Total
Longhorns			0
Aggies			0

at Kyle Field • College Station, Texas

- Date: November 27
- TV: ABC

Statistics	TEX	TAMU
First downs		
Plays–yards		
Rushes–yards		
Passing yards		
Passing: comp–att–int		
Time of possession		

Team	Category	Player	Statistics
Texas	Passing		
Texas	Rushing		
Texas	Receiving		
Texas A&M	Passing		
Texas A&M	Rushing		
Texas A&M	Receiving		
