= Shadarius Toodle =

American football linebacker

No. 24 – Auburn Tigers
- Position: Linebacker
- Class: Freshman

Personal information
- Listed height: 6 ft 3 in (1.91 m)
- Listed weight: 235 lb (107 kg)

Career information
- High school: Cottage Hill (Mobile, Alabama)
- College: Auburn (2026–present)
- Stats at ESPN

Shadarius Toodle is an American football linebacker for the Auburn Tigers.

== Early life ==
Toodle attended Cottage Hill Christian Academy in Mobile, Alabama. He was rated as a four-star recruit by 247Sports and committed to play college football for the Auburn Tigers. However, Toodle later flipped his commitment to play for the Georgia Bulldogs. Ultimately, he flipped his commitment again back to Auburn.

== College career ==
Toodle entered his freshman season in 2026 buried on the Tigers depth chart at linebacker. In week 10 of the 2026 season, he made his collegiate debut due to multiple injuries at linebacker, where he posted 11 tackles with four and a half for a loss, and an Auburn freshman record three sacks in a win over Arkansas.

== Personal life ==
Toodle is the younger brother of Auburn safety Shadrick Toodle Jr.
