= 2026 North Alabama Lions football team =

American college football season

2026 North Alabama Lions football
- Conference: United Athletic Conference
- Record: 7–5 (4–3 UAC)
- Head coach: Brent Dearmon (4th season)
- Offensive coordinator: Travis Partridge (1st season)
- Defensive coordinator: Clint Bowen (1st season)
- Home stadium: Bobby Wallace Field at Bank Independent Stadium

2026 United Athletic Conference standings
	Conf.			Overall
Team	W		L	W		L
No. 1 Tarleton State $^	7	–	0	12	–	0
No. 19 Abilene Christian	5	–	2	6	–	6
No. 14 Austin Peay	4	–	3	8	–	4
North Alabama	4	–	3	7	–	5
Central Arkansas	3	–	4	5	–	7
Eastern Kentucky	3	–	4	4	–	8
West Florida*	2	–	5	5	–	5
West Georgia*	0	–	7	1	–	11
^ – FCS playoff participant; * – Ineligible for UAC title and FCS postseason play due to transition from NCAA Division II.; As of November 22, 2026; Rankings from STATS Poll

The 2026 North Alabama Lions football team represent the University of North Alabama as a member of the United Athletic Conference (UAC) during the 2026 NCAA Division I FCS football season. The Lions are led by fourth-year head coach Brent Dearmon and will play their home games at the on campus Bobby Wallace Field at Bank Independent Stadium in Florence, Alabama. The season is the first season for the Lions at Bank Independent Stadium as they leave Braly Municipal Stadium, the program's home since creation in the 1949 season.

== Offseason ==
=== Transfers ===
==== Outgoing ====
The Lions lost nine players to the transfer portal.

Player	Position	New school
Lance Bassett	DL	Southern Illinois
Lonell Cunningham II	DB	Grambling State
Nathan Curry	LS	Wyoming
BJ Diakite	DE	Utah State
Zacchaeus Dixon	DL	Mercyhurst
Seth Hampton	LB	Towson
Joshua Seudass	DL	Alabama A&M
Rayqwon Smith	DT	Bethune–Cookman
Adam Watford	P	Alabama

==== Incoming ====
The Lions added eighteen players from the transfer portal.

Player	Position	Previous school
Cayden Adkins	DE	Georgia State
Kavion Benton	DL	Memphis
Banks Bowen	QB	Oklahoma State
Jaylon Calhoun	RB	Appalachian State
Mond Cole	DT	Memphis
DJ Dixon	DB	Tennessee State
Will French	OL	Memphis
Kamore Harris	ATH	Memphis
Leavy Johnson	OL	South Alabama
Xavier Johnson	WR	Memphis
Chris McMillian	RB	Bowling Green
Donovan Nevils	DL	Memphis
Snap Reed	WR	Tennessee State
Isaac Rue	OL	Middle Tennessee
Connor Ruth	TE	Tennessee State
Eli Sisson	TE	Liberty
Kanijal Thomas	CB	Kansas State
Joshua White	DL	Memphis

== Preseason ==
=== UAC media days ===
==== Preseason media poll ====
Preseason polls were released on July 21, 2026.

UAC coaches' poll
Predicted finish	Team	Votes (1st place)
T-1	Abilene Christian	65 (3)
T-1	Tarleton State	65 (3)
3	Austin Peay	62 (2)
4	Eastern Kentucky	48
5	Central Arkansas	43
6	West Georgia	39
7	North Alabama	37
8	West Florida	33

== Schedule ==
North Alabama's 2026 schedule features twelve games. They will play six at home, five away, and one neutral site game. It starts on Week 0 with a neutral site matchup in Huntsville, Alabama against the Samford Bulldogs, the first meeting between the teams since 2002. Another major matchup is on September 19 when the Lions play their first game at Bank Independent Stadium against Alcorn State.

Sacramento State was originally slated to visit North Alabama on October 10 before the Hornets announced that they would be joining the MAC in 2026. Since then, the game has been removed and the sixth home game for the Lions has been replaced with a conference matchup against the newest member of the UAC, the West Florida Argonauts, on November 7th. This will mark the fourth meeting between the two as they were both in the Gulf South Conference between 2016 and 2018.

Date	Time	Opponent	Site	TV	Result	Attendance
August 29	6:00 p.m.	vs. Samford*	Wicks Family Field at Joe Davis Stadium; Huntsville, AL (Story Financial Partners Bowl)	ESPN+	W 22–10	5,493
September 5	3:15 p.m.	at Arkansas*	Donald W. Reynolds Razorback Stadium; Fayetteville, AR	SECN	L 14–31	69,178
September 12	6:00 p.m.	at Southeastern Louisiana*	Strawberry Stadium; Hammond, LA	ESPN+	L 25–30	4,054
September 19	6:00 p.m.	Alcorn State*	Bobby Wallace Field at Bank Independent Stadium; Florence, AL (Bank Independent Stadium Grand Opening)	ESPN+	W 38–20	11,830
September 26	3:00 p.m.	Western Illinois*	Bobby Wallace Field at Bank Independent Stadium; Florence, AL	ESPN+	W 23–20	9,872
October 3	5:00 p.m.	at Eastern Kentucky	Roy Kidd Stadium; Richmond, KY	ESPN+	W 20–16	6,512
October 17	6:00 p.m.	Abilene Christian	Bobby Wallace Field at Bank Independent Stadium; Florence, AL	ESPN+	L 28–31	9,186
October 24	6:00 p.m.	No. 9 Austin Peay^{†}	Bobby Wallace Field at Bank Independent Stadium; Florence, AL	ESPN+	L 21–27	12,008
October 31	4:00 p.m.	at Central Arkansas	Estes Stadium; Conway, AR	ESPN+	W 14–9	5,179
November 7	6:00 p.m.	West Florida	Bobby Wallace Field at Bank Independent Stadium; Florence, AL	ESPN+	W 28–21	9,357
November 14	1:00 p.m.	at West Georgia	University Stadium; Carrollton, GA	ESPN+	W 28–7	2,846
November 21	3:00 p.m.	No. 1 Tarleton State	Bobby Wallace Field at Bank Independent Stadium; Florence, AL	ESPN+	L 24–31	9,813
*Non-conference game; ^{†}Homecoming; Rankings from STATS Poll released prior to the game; All times are in Central time

== Game summaries ==
=== vs. Samford ===
North Alabama Lions (0–0) vs. Samford Bulldogs (0–0) – Game summary

Quarter	1	2	3	4	Total
Lions	0	16	0	6	22
Bulldogs	0	7	0	3	10

at Joe W. Davis Stadium • Huntsville, Alabama

- Date: August 29
- Game time: 6:00 p.m.
- Game weather: Sunny • Temperature: 91 °F (33 °C) • Wind: NW at 4 miles per hour (6.4 km/h)
- Game attendance: 5,493
- Referee: Branden McCain
- TV announcers (ESPN+): Benjamin Ray (play-by-play), Bryan Neece (analyst) and Gyvan Hammons (sideline)

Game information

First quarter

- No scoring plays.

Second quarter

- UNA – Xavier Johnson 95-yard pass from Destin Wade (Ian Vachon kick), 8:44. Lions 7–0. Drive: 4 plays, 96 yards, 1:32.
- UNA – Team safety, 6:58. Lions 9–0.
- SAM – Marquise Henderson 86-yard pass from Gabarri Johnson (Ty Ippolito kick), 4:19. Lions 9–7. Drive: 1 play, 86 yards, 0:11.
- UNA – Roderick Taylor Jr. 3-yard run (Ian Vachon kick), 0:21. Lions 16–7. Drive: 13 plays, 88 yards, 3:58.

Third quarter

- No scoring plays.

Fourth quarter

- SAM – Ty Ippolito 26-yard field goal, 14:53. Lions 16–10. Drive: 5 plays, 48 yards, 1:23.
- UNA – Ty Watkins 1-yard run (pass failed), 6:38. Lions 22–10. Drive: 10 plays, 91 yards, 4:49.

Statistics	UNA	SAM
First downs	15	10
Plays–yards	66–394	58–237
Rushes–yards	47–165	25–(-8)
Passing yards	229	245
Passing: comp–att–int	13–19–0	19–33–1
Turnovers	0	1
Time of possession	32:54	27:06

Team	Category	Player	Statistics
North Alabama	Passing	Destin Wade	13/19, 229 yards, TD
North Alabama	Rushing	Jalen Fletcher	11 carries, 81 yards
North Alabama	Receiving	Xavier Johnson	5 receptions, 129 yards, TD
Samford	Passing	Gabarri Johnson	19/33, 245 yards, TD, INT
Samford	Rushing	Keion Dunlap	2 carries, 4 yards
Samford	Receiving	Marquise Henderson	5 receptions, 151 yards, TD

=== at Arkansas (FBS) ===
North Alabama Lions (1–0) at Arkansas Razorbacks (FBS) (0–0) – Game summary

Quarter	1	2	3	4	Total
Lions	0	0	7	7	14
Razorbacks (FBS)	7	7	7	10	31

at Donald W. Reynolds Razorback Stadium • Fayetteville, Arkansas

- Date: September 5
- Game time: 3:15 p.m.
- Game weather: Sunny • Temperature: 101 °F (38 °C) • Wind: SW at 5 miles per hour (8.0 km/h)
- Game attendance: 69,178
- Referee: Ted Pitts
- TV announcers (SECN): Dave Neal (play-by-play), Cole Cubelic (analyst) and Tori Petry (sideline reporter)

Game information

First quarter

- (0:36) ARK – Ismael Cisse 20-yard pass from KJ Jackson, Max Gilbert kick (Drive: 7 plays, 67 yards, 2:25; Arkansas 7–0)

Second quarter

- (8:41) ARK – Matt Adcock 2-yard pass from KJ Jackson, Max Gilbert kick (Drive: 11 plays, 65 yards, 5:23; Arkansas 14–0)

Third quarter

- (6:49) ARK – Jaden Platt 10-yard pass from KJ Jackson, Max Gilbert kick (Drive: 12 plays, 73 yards, 6:19; Arkansas 21–0)
- (2:10) UNA – Destin Wade 6-yard run, Ian Vachon kick (Drive: 4 plays, 35 yards, 1:18; Arkansas 21–7)

Fourth quarter

- (11:58) ARK – Braylen Russell 1-yard run, Max Gilbert kick (Drive: 11 plays, 75 yards, 5:12; Arkansas 28–7)
- (10:24) UNA – Destin Wade 4-yard run, Ian Vachon kick (Drive: 4 plays, 75 yards, 1:34; Arkansas 28–14)
- (2:59) ARK – Max Gilbert 33-yard field goal (Drive: 13 plays, 60 yards, 7:25; Arkansas 31–14)

Statistics	UNA	ARK
First downs	7	29
Plays–yards	44–153	84–415
Rushes–yards	20–40	49–148
Passing yards	113	267
Passing: comp–att–int	12–24–0	24–35–1
Turnovers	1	3
Time of possession	18:35	41:25

Team	Category	Player	Statistics
North Alabama	Passing	Destin Wade	12/23, 113 yards
North Alabama	Rushing	Jalen Fletcher	4 carries, 24 yards
North Alabama	Receiving	Xavier Johnson	6 receptions, 82 yards
Arkansas	Passing	KJ Jackson	24/35, 267 yards, 3 TD, INT
Arkansas	Rushing	Braylen Russell	17 carries, 49 yards, TD
Arkansas	Receiving	Chris Marshall	7 receptions, 79 yards

=== at Southeastern Louisiana ===
North Alabama Lions (1–1) at Southeastern Louisiana Lions (0–2) – Game summary

Quarter	1	2	3	4	Total
North Alabama	0	0	0	0	0
Southeastern Louisiana	0	0	0	0	0

at Strawberry Stadium • Hammond, Louisiana

- Date: September 12
- Game time: 6:00 p.m. CDT
- TV: ESPN+

Game information

First quarter
Second quarter
Third quarter
Fourth quarter

Statistics	UNA	SELA
First downs		
Plays–yards		
Rushes–yards		
Passing yards		
Passing: comp–att–int		
Turnovers		
Time of possession		

Team	Category	Player	Statistics
North Alabama	Passing		
North Alabama	Rushing		
North Alabama	Receiving		
Southeastern Louisiana	Passing		
Southeastern Louisiana	Rushing		
Southeastern Louisiana	Receiving		

=== Alcorn State ===
Alcorn State Braves (2–1) at North Alabama Lions (1–2) – Game summary

Quarter	1	2	3	4	Total
Braves	0	0	0	0	0
Lions	0	0	0	0	0

at Bank Independent Stadium • Florence, Alabama

- Date: September 19
- Game time: 6:00 p.m.
- TV: ESPN+

Game information

First quarter
Second quarter
Third quarter
Fourth quarter

Statistics	ALCN	UNA
First downs		
Plays–yards		
Rushes–yards		
Passing yards		
Passing: comp–att–int		
Turnovers		
Time of possession		

Team	Category	Player	Statistics
Alcorn State	Passing		
Alcorn State	Rushing		
Alcorn State	Receiving		
North Alabama	Passing		
North Alabama	Rushing		
North Alabama	Receiving		

=== Western Illinois ===
Western Illinois Leathernecks (2–2) at North Alabama Lions (2–2) – Game summary

Quarter	1	2	3	4	Total
Leathernecks	0	0	0	0	0
Lions	0	0	0	0	0

at Bank Independent Stadium • Florence, Alabama

- Date: September 26
- Game time: 3:00 p.m.
- TV announcers (ESPN+): Benjamin Ray (play-by-play), Bryan Neece (analyst) and Gyvan Hammons (sideline)

Game information

First quarter
Second quarter
Third quarter
Fourth quarter

Statistics	WIU	UNA
First downs		
Plays–yards		
Rushes–yards		
Passing yards		
Passing: comp–att–int		
Turnovers		
Time of possession		

Team	Category	Player	Statistics
Western Illinois	Passing		
Western Illinois	Rushing		
Western Illinois	Receiving		
North Alabama	Passing		
North Alabama	Rushing		
North Alabama	Receiving		

=== at Eastern Kentucky ===
North Alabama Lions (3–2) at Eastern Kentucky Colonels (1–3) – Game summary

Quarter	1	2	3	4	Total
Lions	3	0	14	3	20
Colonels	7	6	0	3	16

at Roy Kidd Stadium • Richmond, Kentucky

- Date: October 3
- Game time: 5:00 p.m.
- TV announcers (ESPN+): Wes Chandler (play-by-play), Jonathan Duff (analyst) and Maggie Davis (sideline)

Game information

First quarter
Second quarter
Third quarter
Fourth quarter

Statistics	UNA	EKU
First downs	14	17
Plays–yards	58–280	71–291
Rushes–yards	37–203	37–152
Passing yards	77	143
Passing: comp–att–int	8–21–0	16–34–4
Turnovers	0	4
Time of possession	25:32	34:28

Team	Category	Player	Statistics
North Alabama	Passing	Destin Wade	8/21, 77 yards, 1 TD
North Alabama	Rushing	Roderick Taylor Jr	9 carries, 63 yards
North Alabama	Receiving	Snap Reed	3 receptions, 37 yards
Eastern Kentucky	Passing	Jordyn Potts	16/34, 143 yards, 4 INT
Eastern Kentucky	Rushing	Brady Hensley	24 carries, 96 yards, 1 TD
Eastern Kentucky	Receiving	Elijah Caldwell	6 receptions, 53 yards

=== Abilene Christian ===
Abilene Christian Wildcats (3–4) at North Alabama Lions (4–2) – Game summary

Quarter	1	2	3	4	Total
Wildcats	0	0	0	0	0
Lions	0	0	0	0	0

at Bank Independent Stadium • Florence, Alabama

- Date: October 17
- Game time: 6:00 p.m.

Game information

First quarter
Second quarter
Third quarter
Fourth quarter

Statistics	ACU	UNA
First downs		
Plays–yards		
Rushes–yards		
Passing yards		
Passing: comp–att–int		
Turnovers		
Time of possession		

Team	Category	Player	Statistics
Abilene Christian	Passing		
Abilene Christian	Rushing		
Abilene Christian	Receiving		
North Alabama	Passing		
North Alabama	Rushing		
North Alabama	Receiving		

=== No. 9 Austin Peay ===
No. 9 Austin Peay Governors (6–2) at North Alabama Lions (4–3) – Game summary

Quarter	1	2	3	4	Total
No. 9 Governors	0	0	0	0	0
Lions	0	0	0	0	0

at Bank Independent Stadium • Florence, Alabama

- Date: October 24
- Game time: 6:00 p.m.

Game information

First quarter
Second quarter
Third quarter
Fourth quarter

Statistics	APSU	UNA
First downs		
Plays–yards		
Rushes–yards		
Passing yards		
Passing: comp–att–int		
Turnovers		
Time of possession		

Team	Category	Player	Statistics
Austin Peay	Passing		
Austin Peay	Rushing		
Austin Peay	Receiving		
North Alabama	Passing		
North Alabama	Rushing		
North Alabama	Receiving		

=== at Central Arkansas ===
North Alabama Lions (4–4) at Central Arkansas Bears (2–6) – Game summary

Quarter	1	2	3	4	Total
Lions	0	0	0	0	0
Bears	0	0	0	0	0

at Estes Stadium • Conway, Arkansas

- Date: October 31
- Game time: 4:00 p.m.

Game information

First quarter
Second quarter
Third quarter
Fourth quarter

Statistics	UNA	CARK
First downs		
Plays–yards		
Rushes–yards		
Passing yards		
Passing: comp–att–int		
Turnovers		
Time of possession		

Team	Category	Player	Statistics
North Alabama	Passing		
North Alabama	Rushing		
North Alabama	Receiving		
Central Arkansas	Passing		
Central Arkansas	Rushing		
Central Arkansas	Receiving		

=== West Florida ===
West Florida Argonauts (4–3) at North Alabama Lions (5–4) – Game summary

Quarter	1	2	3	4	Total
Argonauts	7	0	7	7	21
Lions	7	14	7	0	28

at Bank Independent Stadium • Florence, Alabama

- Date: November 7
- Game time: 6:00 p.m.
- Game weather: Clear • Temperature: 49 °F (9 °C)
- Game attendance: 9,357
- Referee: John Kellermeier
- TV announcers (ESPN+): Benjamin Ray (play-by-play), Bryan Neece (analyst) and Gyvan Hammons (sideline)

Game information

First quarter

- UWF – Keishawn Smith 16-yard pass from Ty'Ray Davis (Reid Grek kick), 7:08. Argonauts 7–0. Drive: 9 plays, 75 yards, 4:11.
- UNA – Snap Reed 48-yard pass from Destin Wade (Ian Vachon kick), 5:00. Tied 7–7. Drive: 4 plays, 78 yards, 2:04.

Second quarter

- UNA – Roderick Taylor Jr. 45-yard run (Ian Vachon kick), 7:43. Lions 14–7. Drive: 9 plays, 61 yards, 6:11.
- UNA – Destin Wade 1-yard run (Ian Vachon kick), 3:44. Lions 21–7. Drive: 7 plays, 80 yards, 3:00.

Third quarter

- UWF – Roderick Webb 60-yard interception return (Reid Grek kick), 14:08. Lions 21–14.
- UNA – Xavier Johnson 45-yard pass from Destin Wade (Ian Vachon kick), 12:13. Lions 28–14. Drive: 4 plays, 75 yards, 1:55.

Fourth quarter

- UWF – Luc Carroll 28-yard pass from Ty'Ray Davis (Reid Grek kick), 7:33. Lions 28–21. Drive: 8 plays, 73 yards, 4:34.

Statistics	UWF	UNA
First downs	22	18
Plays–yards	68–413	58–438
Rushes–yards	33–105	39–244
Passing yards	308	194
Passing: comp–att–int	22–35–1	12–19–2
Turnovers	1	2
Time of possession	30:13	29:47

Team	Category	Player	Statistics
West Florida	Passing	Ty'Ray Davis	22/35, 308 yards, 2 TD, INT
West Florida	Rushing	Keishawn Smith	13 carries, 53 yards
West Florida	Receiving	Luc Carroll	6 receptions, 85 yards, TD
North Alabama	Passing	Destin Wade	12/19, 194 yards, 2 TD, 2 INT
North Alabama	Rushing	Destin Wade	16 carries, 109 yards, TD
North Alabama	Receiving	Snap Reed	6 receptions, 117 yards, TD

=== at West Georgia ===
North Alabama Lions (6–4) at West Georgia Wolves (1–9) – Game summary

Quarter	1	2	3	4	Total
Lions	0	0	0	0	0
Wolves	0	0	0	0	0

at University Stadium • Carrollton, Georgia

- Date: November 14

Game information

First quarter
Second quarter
Third quarter
Fourth quarter

Statistics	UNA	UWG
First downs		
Plays–yards		
Rushes–yards		
Passing yards		
Passing: comp–att–int		
Turnovers		
Time of possession		

Team	Category	Player	Statistics
North Alabama	Passing		
North Alabama	Rushing		
North Alabama	Receiving		
West Georgia	Passing		
West Georgia	Rushing		
West Georgia	Receiving		

=== No. 1 Tarleton State ===
No. 1 Tarleton State Texans (11–0) at North Alabama Lions (7–4) – Game summary

Quarter	1	2	3	4	Total
No. 1 Texans	0	0	0	0	0
Lions	0	0	0	0	0

at Bank Independent Stadium • Florence, Alabama

- Date: November 21
- Game time: 3:00 p.m.

Game information

First quarter
Second quarter
Third quarter
Fourth quarter

Statistics	TAR	UNA
First downs		
Plays–yards		
Rushes–yards		
Passing yards		
Passing: comp–att–int		
Turnovers		
Time of possession		

Team	Category	Player	Statistics
Tarleton State	Passing		
Tarleton State	Rushing		
Tarleton State	Receiving		
North Alabama	Passing		
North Alabama	Rushing		
North Alabama	Receiving		

== Rankings ==
Ranking movements Legend: ██ Increase in ranking ██ Decrease in ranking — = Not ranked RV = Received votes
	Week																				
Poll	Pre	1	2	3	4	5	6	7	8	9	10	11	12	13	14	15	16	17	18	19	Final
Coaches	—	—	—	—	—	—	RV	RV													
