= 2025 Arkansas Razorbacks football team =

American college football season

2025 Arkansas Razorbacks football
- Conference: Southeastern Conference
- Record: 2–10 (0–8 SEC)
- Head coach: Sam Pittman (6th season; first 5 games); Bobby Petrino (interim, remainder of season)
- Offensive coordinator: Bobby Petrino (2nd season; first 5 games); Kolby Smith (interim; remainder of season
- Offensive scheme: Veer and Shoot
- Defensive coordinator: Travis Williams (3rd season; first 5 games); Chris Wilson (interim; remainder of season)
- Co-defensive coordinator: Marcus Woodson (3rd season; first 5 games)
- Base defense: 4–2–5
- Home stadium: Donald W. Reynolds Razorback Stadium; War Memorial Stadium

2025 Southeastern Conference football standings
	Conf.			Overall
Team	W		L	W		L
No. 9 Alabama y^	7	–	1	11	–	4
No. 6 Georgia y$^	7	–	1	12	–	2
No. 3 Ole Miss ^	7	–	1	13	–	2
No. 8 Texas A&M ^	7	–	1	11	–	2
No. 13 Oklahoma ^	6	–	2	10	–	3
No. 12 Texas	6	–	2	10	–	3
No. 15 Vanderbilt	6	–	2	10	–	3
Missouri	4	–	4	8	–	5
Tennessee	4	–	4	8	–	5
LSU	3	–	5	7	–	6
Kentucky	2	–	6	5	–	7
Florida	2	–	6	4	–	8
Auburn	1	–	7	5	–	7
Mississippi State	1	–	7	5	–	8
South Carolina	1	–	7	4	–	8
Arkansas	0	–	8	2	–	10
Championship: Georgia 28, Alabama 7
^ – College Football Playoff participant; $ – Conference champion; y – Championship game participant; Rankings from AP Poll

The 2025 Arkansas Razorbacks football team represented the University of Arkansas as a member of the Southeastern Conference (SEC) during the 2025 NCAA Division I FBS football season. Led by sixth-year head coach Sam Pittman, the Razorbacks played six home games at Donald W. Reynolds Razorback Stadium in Fayetteville, Arkansas and one home game at War Memorial Stadium in Little Rock, Arkansas.

On September 28, Pittman was fired as the Razorbacks' head coach. Offensive coordinator Bobby Petrino, who previously served as the Razorbacks' head coach from 2008 to 2011, was named interim head coach. On September 29, Petrino fired defensive coordinator Travis Williams, co-DC Marcus Woodson, and D-Line coach Deke Adams. RB coach Kolby Smith served as the interim offensive coordinator, but Petrino still called the plays. Assistant defensive line coach Chris Wilson served as the interim defensive coordinator.

During Pittman's tenure as head coach (five complete seasons and the first five games of his 6th season), he compiled a 32–34 overall record, with a 14–29 conference record, and won 3 bowl games, with one Top 25 finish in 2021.

The Razorbacks winning percentage (.167) in 2025 is tied with the 2018 and 2019 teams for the lowest in program history. On November 30, Arkansas hired former Memphis coach Ryan Silverfield as the new Razorbacks head coach. Silverfield and Memphis defeated Arkansas on September 20 during the 2025 season in Memphis, before Pittman was fired.

The Arkansas Razorbacks drew an average home attendance of 69,762, the 19th-highest of all college football teams.

== Schedule ==
Date	Time	Opponent	Site	TV	Result	Attendance
August 30	3:15 p.m.	Alabama A&M*	Donald W. Reynolds Razorback Stadium; Fayetteville, AR	SECN	W 52–7	70,827
September 6	4:00 p.m.	Arkansas State*	War Memorial Stadium; Little Rock, AR	SECN+/ESPN+	W 56–14	54,224
September 13	6:00 p.m.	at No. 17 Ole Miss	Vaught–Hemingway Stadium; Oxford, MS (rivalry)	ESPN	L 35–41	65,068
September 20	11:00 a.m.	at Memphis*	Simmons Bank Liberty Stadium; Memphis, TN	ABC	L 31–32	39,861
September 27	11:00 a.m.	No. 22 Notre Dame*	Donald W. Reynolds Razorback Stadium; Fayetteville, AR	ABC	L 13–56	75,111
October 11	3:15 p.m.	at No. 12 Tennessee	Neyland Stadium; Knoxville, TN	SECN	L 31–34	101,915
October 18	4:30 p.m.	No. 4 Texas A&M	Donald W. Reynolds Razorback Stadium; Fayetteville, AR (rivalry)	ESPN/ESPNews	L 42–45	73,845
October 25	11:45 a.m.	Auburn	Donald W. Reynolds Razorback Stadium; Fayetteville, AR	SECN	L 24–33	68,922
November 1	3:00 p.m.	Mississippi State^{†}	Donald W. Reynolds Razorback Stadium; Fayetteville, AR	SECN	L 35–38	68,358
November 15	11:45 a.m.	at LSU	Tiger Stadium; Baton Rouge, LA (rivalry)	SECN	L 22–23	100,212
November 22	2:30 p.m.	at No. 17 Texas	Darrell K Royal–Texas Memorial Stadium; Austin, TX (rivalry)	ABC	L 37–52	102,361
November 29	2:30 p.m.	Missouri	Donald W. Reynolds Razorback Stadium; Fayetteville, AR (Battle Line Rivalry)	SECN	L 17–31	61,508
*Non-conference game; ^{†}Homecoming; Rankings from AP Poll (and CFP Rankings, after November 4) - Released prior to game; All times are in Central time

== Game summaries ==
=== Alabama A&M (FCS) ===
Alabama A&M Bulldogs (FCS) (0–0) at Arkansas Razorbacks (0–0) – Game summary

Quarter	1	2	3	4	Total
Bulldogs (FCS)	7	0	0	0	7
Razorbacks	10	21	14	7	52

at Donald W. Reynolds Razorback Stadium • Fayetteville, Arkansas

- Date: August 30
- Game time: 3:15 p.m. CDT
- Game weather: Sunny • Temperature: 81 °F (27 °C) • Wind: SE at 6 miles per hour (9.7 km/h)
- Game attendance: 70,827
- Referee: Steve Marlowe
- TV announcers (SECN): Dave Neal (play-by-play), Fozzy Whittaker (analyst), and Morgan Uber (sideline reporter)

Game information

First quarter

- (10:03) ARK – CJ Brown 16-yard pass from Taylen Green, Scott Starzyk kick (Drive: 9 plays, 73 yards, 4:51; Arkansas 7–0)
- (6:28) AAMU – Maurice Edwards IV 6-yard run, Victor Barbosa kick (Drive: 7 plays, 75 yards, 3:35; Tied 7–7)
- (3:37) ARK – Scott Starzyk 53-yard field goal (Drive: 6 plays, 33 yards, 2:45; Arkansas 10–7)

Second quarter

- (13:41) ARK – Raylen Sharpe 35-yard pass from Taylen Green, Scott Starzyk kick (Drive: 9 plays, 75 yards, 2:55; Arkansas 17–7)
- (2:12) ARK – Jalen Brown 5-yard pass from Taylen Green, Scott Starzyk kick (Drive: 6 plays, 65 yards, 2:20; Arkansas 24–7)
- (0:06) ARK – O'Mega Blake 6-yard pass from Taylen Green, Scott Starzyk kick (Drive: 6 plays, 59 yards, 0:59; Arkansas 31–7)

Third quarter

- (11:07) ARK – CJ Brown 14-yard pass from Taylen Green, Scott Starzyk kick (Drive: 6 plays, 66 yards, 3:08; Arkansas 38–7)
- (2:53) ARK – Andreas Paaske 5-yard pass from Taylen Green, Scott Starzyk kick (Drive: 12 plays, 65 yards, 6:08; Arkansas 45–7)

Fourth quarter

- (13:51) ARK – Mike Washington Jr. 27-yard pass from KJ Jackson, Scott Starzyk kick (Drive: 3 plays, 61 yards, 0:54; Arkansas 52–7)

Statistics	AAMU	ARK
First downs	12	29
Plays–yards	55–235	76–552
Rushes–yards	26–69	40–194
Passing yards	166	358
Passing: comp–att–int	15–29–0	26–36–0
Turnovers	2	0
Time of possession	26:21	33:39

Team	Category	Player	Statistics
Alabama A&M	Passing	Cornelius Brown IV	9/19, 130 yards
Alabama A&M	Rushing	Kaden Dixon	5 carries, 37 yards
Alabama A&M	Receiving	Travaunta Abner	3 receptions, 49 yards
Arkansas	Passing	Taylen Green	24/31, 322 yards, 6 TD
Arkansas	Rushing	Mike Washington Jr.	9 carries, 79 yards
Arkansas	Receiving	O'Mega Blake	7 receptions, 121 yards, TD

=== Arkansas State ===
Arkansas State Red Wolves (1–0) at Arkansas Razorbacks (1–0) – Game summary

Quarter	1	2	3	4	Total
Red Wolves	7	7	0	0	14
Razorbacks	28	7	14	7	56

at War Memorial Stadium • Little Rock, Arkansas

- Date: September 6
- Game time: 4:00 p.m. CDT
- Game weather: Cloudy • Temperature: 71 °F (22 °C) • Wind: NE at 7 miles per hour (11 km/h)
- Game attendance: 54,224
- Referee: James Carter
- TV announcers (SECN+/ESPN+): Richard Cross (play-by-play) and Taylor McHargue (analyst)

Game information

First quarter

- (14:21) ARK – Mike Washington Jr. 53-yard run, Scott Starzyk kick (Drive: 2 plays, 75 yards, 0:39; Arkansas 7–0)
- (10:03) ARK – Raylen Sharpe 37-yard pass from Taylen Green, Scott Starzyk kick (Drive: 6 plays, 80 yards, 2:24; Arkansas 14–0)
- (9:50) ARST – Chauncy Cobb 98-yard kickoff return, Clune Van Andel kick (Arkansas 14–7)
- (8:59) ARK – Taylen Green 64-yard run, Scott Starzyk kick (Drive: 2 plays, 75 yards, 0:51; Arkansas 21–7)
- (5:05) ARK – Braylen Russell 7-yard run, Scott Starzyk kick (Drive: 4 plays, 50 yards, 1:55; Arkansas 28–7)

Second quarter

- (3:44) ARST – Cameron Ambrose 2-yard pass from Jaylen Raynor, Clune Van Andel kick (Drive: 14 plays, 62 yards, 6:46; Arkansas 28–14)
- (0:53) ARK – Jalen Brown 8-yard pass from Taylen Green, Scott Starzyk kick (Drive: 12 plays, 83 yards, 2:51; Arkansas 35–14)

Third quarter

- (11:20) ARK – Rohan Jones 33-yard pass from Taylen Green, Scott Starzyk kick (Drive: 5 plays, 70 yards, 2:10; Arkansas 42–14)
- (3:46) ARK – O'Mega Blake 14-yard pass from Taylen Green, Scott Starzyk kick (Drive: 11 plays, 86 yards, 4:32; Arkansas 49–14)

Fourth quarter

- (6:16) ARK – KJ Jackson 6-yard run, Scott Starzyk kick (Drive: 8 plays, 99 yards, 4:16; Arkansas 56–14)

Statistics	ARST	ARK
First downs	23	29
Plays–yards	78–285	58–630
Rushes–yards	42–153	29–321
Passing yards	132	309
Passing: comp–att–int	22–36–2	20–29–2
Turnovers	2	2
Time of possession	37:10	22:50

Team	Category	Player	Statistics
Arkansas State	Passing	Jaylen Raynor	21/33, 125 yards, TD, 2 INT
Arkansas State	Rushing	Jaylen Raynor	15 carries, 38 yards
Arkansas State	Receiving	Chauncy Cobb	4 receptions, 50 yards
Arkansas	Passing	Taylen Green	17/26, 239 yards, 4 TD, 2 INT
Arkansas	Rushing	Taylen Green	9 carries, 151 yards, TD
Arkansas	Receiving	Rohan Jones	2 receptions, 74 yards, TD

=== at No. 17 Ole Miss (rivalry) ===
Arkansas Razorbacks (2–0) at No. 17 Ole Miss Rebels (2–0) – Game summary

Quarter	1	2	3	4	Total
Razorbacks	7	21	0	7	35
No. 17 Rebels	7	24	7	3	41

at Vaught–Hemingway Stadium • Oxford, Mississippi

- Date: September 13
- Game time: 6:00 p.m. CDT
- Game weather: Sunny • Temperature: 89 °F (32 °C) • Wind: E at 5 miles per hour (8.0 km/h)
- Game attendance: 65,068
- Referee: Jason Autrey
- TV announcers (ESPN): Dave Pasch (play-by-play), Dusty Dvoracek (analyst), and Taylor McGregor (sideline reporter)

Game information

First quarter

- (7:14) MISS – Kewan Lacy 2-yard run, Lucas Carneiro kick (Drive: 13 plays, 67 yards, 5:37; Ole Miss 7–0)
- (0:10) ARK – O'Mega Blake 30-yard pass from Taylen Green, Scott Starzyk kick (Drive: 12 plays, 75 yards, 7:04; Tied 7–7)

Second quarter

- (14:16) MISS – Trinidad Chambliss 2-yard run, Lucas Carneiro kick (Drive: 4 plays, 75 yards, 0:54; Ole Miss 14–7)
- (13:22) ARK – Mike Washington 47-yard run, Scott Starzyk kick (Drive: 4 plays, 75 yards, 0:54; Tied 14–14)
- (11:31) MISS – Trinidad Chambliss 1-yard run, Lucas Carneiro kick (Drive: 4 plays, 75 yards, 1:51; Ole Miss 21–14)
- (7:01) ARK – Braylen Russell 3-yard run, Scott Starzyk kick (Drive: 10 plays, 75 yards, 4:30; Tied 21–21)
- (3:17) MISS – Harrison Wallace III 4-yard pass from Austin Simmons, Lucas Carneiro kick (Drive: 10 plays, 75 yards, 3:44; Ole Miss 28–21)
- (1:18) ARK – Taylen Green 5-yard run, Scott Starzyk kick (Drive: 7 plays, 75 yards, 1:59; Tied 28–28)
- (0:00) MISS – Lucas Carneiro 36-yard field goal (Drive: 9 plays, 57 yards, 1:18; Ole Miss 31–28)

Third quarter

- (4:56) MISS – De'Zhaun Stribling 6-yard pass from Trinidad Chambliss, Lucas Carneiro kick (Drive: 12 plays, 93 yards, 4:58; Ole Miss 38–28)

Fourth quarter

- (10:58) MISS – Lucas Carneiro 23-yard field goal (Drive: 9 plays, 64 yards, 4:24; Ole Miss 41–28)
- (4:56) ARK – Mike Washington 3-yard run, Scott Starzyk kick (Drive: 12 plays, 75 yards, 6:02; Ole Miss 41–35)

Statistics	ARK	MISS
First downs	29	25
Plays–yards	72–526	70–475
Rushes–yards	37–221	40–118
Passing yards	305	357
Passing: comp–att–int	22–35–0	22–30–0
Turnovers	1	0
Time of possession	33:11	26:49

Team	Category	Player	Statistics
Arkansas	Passing	Taylen Green	22/35, 305 yards, TD
Arkansas	Rushing	Taylen Green	14 carries, 115 yards, TD
Arkansas	Receiving	O'Mega Blake	6 receptions, 81 yards, TD
Ole Miss	Passing	Trinidad Chambliss	21/29, 353 yards, TD
Ole Miss	Rushing	Trinidad Chambliss	15 carries, 62 yards, 2 TD
Ole Miss	Receiving	Harrison Wallace III	6 receptions, 92 yards, TD

=== at Memphis ===
Arkansas Razorbacks (2–1) at Memphis Tigers (3–0) – Game summary

Quarter	1	2	3	4	Total
Razorbacks	7	21	3	0	31
Tigers	10	7	9	6	32

at Simmons Bank Liberty Stadium • Memphis, Tennessee

- Date: September 20
- Game time: 11:00 a.m. CDT
- Game weather: Sunny • Temperature: 82 °F (28 °C) • Wind: N at 0 miles per hour (0 km/h)
- Game attendance: 39,861
- Referee: Tim Rich
- TV announcers (ABC): Joe Tessitore (play-by-play), Jesse Palmer (analyst), and Katie George (sideline reporter)

Game information

First quarter

- (13:50) ARK – Rohan Jones 62-yard pass from Taylen Green, Scott Starzyk kick (Drive: 3 plays, 75 yards, 1:10; Arkansas 7–0)
- (8:57) MEM – Gianni Spetic 38-yard field goal (Drive: 13 plays, 55 yards, 4:53; Arkansas 7–3)
- (0:20) MEM – Brendon Lewis 4-yard run, Gianni Spetic kick (Drive: 11 plays, 71 yards, 6:02; Memphis 10–7)

Second quarter

- (12:37) ARK – Braylen Russell 16-yard run, Scott Starzyk kick (Drive: 6 plays, 77 yards, 2:43; Arkansas 14–10)
- (7:41) ARK – Rohan Jones 5-yard run, Scott Starzyk kick (Drive: 7 plays, 66 yards, 3:27; Arkansas 21–10)
- (1:35) ARK – Mike Washington Jr. 1-yard run, Scott Starzyk kick (Drive: 4 plays, 52 yards, 0:54; Arkansas 28–10)
- (0:31) MEM – Cortez Braham Jr. 38-yard pass from Brendon Lewis, Gianni Spetic kick (Drive: 6 plays, 75 yards, 1:04; Arkansas 28–17)

Third quarter

- (7:25) MEM – Gianni Spetic 47-yard field goal (Drive: 6 plays, 30 yards, 3:17; Arkansas 28–20)
- (4:16) ARK – Scott Starzyk 46-yard field goal (Drive: 8 plays, 47 yards, 3:09; Arkansas 31–20)
- (1:40) MEM – Brendon Lewis 10-yard run, pass failed (Drive: 5 plays, 75 yards, 2:36; Arkansas 31–26)

Fourth quarter

- (4:51) MEM – Sutton Smith 64-yard run, pass failed (Drive: 4 plays, 94 yards, 1:35; Memphis 32–31)

Statistics	ARK	MEM
First downs	23	26
Plays–yards	66–500	72–489
Rushes–yards	32–175	41–290
Passing yards	325	199
Passing: comp–att–int	18–34–2	15–31–2
Turnovers	3	2
Time of possession	27:55	32:05

Team	Category	Player	Statistics
Arkansas	Passing	Taylen Green	18/34, 325 yards, TD, 2 INT
Arkansas	Rushing	Mike Washington Jr.	15 carries, 70 yards, TD
Arkansas	Receiving	Rohan Jones	2 receptions, 102 yards, TD
Memphis	Passing	Brendon Lewis	15/30, 199 yards, TD, INT
Memphis	Rushing	Sutton Smith	12 carries, 147 yards, TD
Memphis	Receiving	Cortez Braham Jr.	7 receptions, 102 yards, TD

=== No. 22 Notre Dame ===
No. 22 Notre Dame Fighting Irish (1–2) at Arkansas Razorbacks (2–2) – Game summary

Quarter	1	2	3	4	Total
No. 22 Fighting Irish	14	28	7	7	56
Razorbacks	3	10	0	0	13

at Donald W. Reynolds Razorback Stadium • Fayetteville, Arkansas

- Date: September 27
- Game time: 11:00 a.m.
- Game weather: Sunny, 75 °F (24 °C), Wind SW @ 3 mph (5 km/h)
- Game attendance: 75,111
- Referee: Lee Hedrick
- TV announcers (ABC): Dave Pasch (play-by-play), Dusty Dvoracek (analyst), and Taylor McGregor (sideline reporter)

Game information

First quarter

- (12:55) ARK – Scott Starzyk 39-yard field goal (Drive: 7 plays, 54 yards, 2:05, Arkansas 3–0)
- (8:16) ND – Jeremiyah Love 1-yard run, Noah Burnette kick (Drive: 10 plays, 75 yards, 4:39, Notre Dame 7–3)
- (4:14) ND – Jeremiyah Love 7-yard pass from CJ Carr, Noah Burnette kick (Drive: 6 plays, 73 yards, 3:14, Notre Dame 14–3)

Second quarter

- (11:19) ARK – Shaq McRoy 1-yard run, Scott Starzyk kick (Drive: 14 plays, 75 yards, 7:55, Notre Dame 14–10)
- (8:26) ND – Will Pauling 23-yard pass from CJ Carr, Noah Burnette kick (Drive: 6 plays, 75 yards, 2:53, Notre Dame 21–10)
- (6:04) ND – Jeremiyah Love 34-yard pass from CJ Carr, Noah Burnette kick (Drive: 5 plays, 70 yards, 1:25, Notre Dame 28–10)
- (3:48) ARK – Scott Starzyk 49-yard field goal (Drive: 6 plays, 44 yards, 2:16, Notre Dame 28–13)
- (0:35) ND – Jeremiyah Love 3-yard run, Noah Burnette kick (Drive: 12 plays, 75 yards, 3:13, Notre Dame 35–13)
- (0:09) ND – Jadarian Price 35-yard pass from CJ Carr, Noah Burnette kick (Drive: 2 plays, 45 yards, 0:15, Notre Dame 42–13)

Third quarter

- (1:01) ND – Jadarian Price 16-yard run, Noah Burnette kick (Drive: 11 plays, 87 yards, 5:37, Notre Dame 49–13)

Fourth quarter

- (8:54) ND – Aneyas Williams 17-yard run, Erik Schmidt kick (Drive: 4 plays, 57 yards, 2:07, Notre Dame 56–13)

Statistics	ND	ARK
First downs	32	15
Plays–yards	72–641	62–365
Rushes–yards	40–210	30–158
Passing yards	431	207
Passing: comp–att–int	24–32–0	17–32–1
Turnovers	0	2
Time of possession	32:47	27:13

Team	Category	Player	Statistics
Notre Dame	Passing	CJ Carr	22/30, 354 yards, 4 TD
Notre Dame	Rushing	Jadarian Price	13 carries, 86 yards, TD
Notre Dame	Receiving	Jordan Faison	7 receptions, 89 yards
Arkansas	Passing	Taylen Green	17/32, 207 yards, INT
Arkansas	Rushing	Taylen Green	10 carries, 81 yards
Arkansas	Receiving	O'Mega Blake	6 receptions, 73 yards

=== at No. 12 Tennessee ===
Arkansas Razorbacks (2–3) at No. 12 Tennessee Volunteers (4–1) – Game summary

Quarter	1	2	3	4	Total
Razorbacks	10	7	0	14	31
No. 12 Volunteers	7	10	10	7	34

at Neyland Stadium • Knoxville, Tennessee

- Date: October 11
- Game time: 3:15 p.m.
- Game weather: Sunny • Temperature: 73 °F (23 °C)
- Game attendance: 101,915
- Referee: James Carter
- TV announcers (SECN): Dave Neal (play-by-play), Fozzy Whittaker (analyst), and Morgan Uber (sideline reporter)

Game information

First quarter

- 10:10 ARK – Taylen Green 11-yard run, Scott Starzyk kick (Drive: 9 plays , 75 yards, 04:50; ARK 7–0)
- 07:39 TENN – DeSean Bishop 17-yard run, Max Gilbert kick (Drive: 7 plays, 75 yards, 02:31; Tied 7–7)
- 00:20 ARK – Scott Starzyk 28-yard field goal (Drive: 11 plays, 70 yards, 05:44; ARK 10–7)

Second quarter

- 10:36 TENN – Max Gilbert 27-yard field goal (Drive: 12 plays, 57 yards, 04:44; Tied 10–10)
- 04:36 ARK – Mike Washington 1-yard run, Scott Starzyk kick (Drive: 11 plays, 75 yards, 05:59; ARK 17–10)
- 02:52 TENN – Miles Kitselman 8-yard pass from Joey Aguilar, Max Gilbert kick (Drive: 5 plays, 75 yards, 01:44; Tied 17–17)

Third quarter

- 11:50 TENN – Max Gilbert 50-yard field goal (Drive: 9 plays, 43 yards, 03:10; TENN 20–17)
- 02:11 TENN – Peyton Lewis 2-yard run, Joey Aguilar kick (Drive: 6 plays, 74 yards, 01:50; TENN 27–17)

Fourth quarter

- 13:14 TENN – Peyton Lewis 3-yard run, Max Gilbert kick (Drive: 4 plays, 19 yards, 01:31; TENN 34–17)
- 08:17 ARK – Rohan Jones 9-yard pass from T Green, Scott Starzyk kick (Drive: 10 plays, 81 yards, 04:53; TENN 34–24)
- 02:55 ARK – Kam Shanks 12-yard pass from Taylen Green, Scott Starzyk kick (Drive: 7 plays, 80 yards, 01:13; TENN 34–31)

Statistics	ARK	TENN
First downs	29	22
Plays–yards	76–496	65–485
Rushes–yards	45–240	40–264
Passing yards	256	221
Passing: comp–att–int	21–31–0	16–25–0
Turnovers	3	0
Time of possession	34:55	25:05

Team	Category	Player	Statistics
Arkansas	Passing	Taylen Green	21/31, 256 yards, 2 TD
Arkansas	Rushing	Mike Washington	19 carries, 135 yards, TD
Arkansas	Receiving	Raylen Sharpe	7 receptions, 76 yards
Tennessee	Passing	Joey Aguilar	16/25, 221 yards, TD
Tennessee	Rushing	DeSean Bishop	14 carries, 150 yards, TD
Tennessee	Receiving	Braylon Staley	6 receptions, 109 yards

=== No. 4 Texas A&M (Southwest Classic) ===
No. 4 Texas A&M Aggies (6–0) at Arkansas Razorbacks (2–4) – Game summary

Quarter	1	2	3	4	Total
No. 4 Aggies	7	14	17	7	45
Razorbacks	3	17	7	15	42

at Donald W. Reynolds Razorback Stadium • Fayetteville, Arkansas

- Date: October 18
- Game time: 5:30 p.m.
- Game weather: Rain • Temperature: 67 °F (19 °C) • Wind: NE at 14 miles per hour (23 km/h)
- Game attendance: 73,845
- Referee: Jason Autrey
- TV announcers (ESPN): Mark Jones (play-by-play), Roddy Jones (analyst), and Quint Kessenich (sideline reporter)

Game information

First quarter

- ARK – Scott Starzyk 22-yard field goal, 11:21. Razorbacks 3–0. Drive: 7 plays, 71 yards, 3:39.
- TA&M – Ashton Bethel-Roman 24-yard pass from Marcel Reed (Randy Bond kick), 6:06. Aggies 7–3. Drive: 10 plays, 75 yards, 5:15.

Second quarter

- TA&M – Marcel Reed 3-yard run (Randy Bond kick), 14:49. Aggies 14–3. Drive: 6 plays, 49 yards, 3:05.
- ARK – Scott Starzyk 22-yard field goal, 11:17. Aggies 14–6. Drive: 9 plays, 71 yards, 3:32.
- TA&M – Nate Boerkircher 1-yard pass from Marcel Reed (Randy Bond kick), 3:32. Aggies 21–6. Drive: 14 plays, 75 yards, 7:45.
- ARK – Taylen Green 27-yard run (Scott Starzyk kick), 1:51. Aggies 21–13. Drive: 5 plays, 75 yards, 1:41.
- ARK – O'Mega Blake 7-yard pass from Taylen Green (Scott Starzyk kick), 0:02. Aggies 21–20. Drive: 5 plays, 71 yards, 0:41.

Third quarter

- TA&M – KC Concepcion 17-yard pass from Marcel Reed (Randy Bond kick), 13:34. Aggies 28–20. Drive: 3 plays, 75 yards, 1:26.
- TA&M – Randy Bond 29-yard field goal, 7:45. Aggies 31–20. Drive: 9 plays, 73 yards, 4:17.
- ARK – Taylen Green 1-yard run (Scott Starzyk kick), 4:28. Aggies 31–27. Drive: 7 plays, 65 yards, 3:17.
- TA&M – Rueben Owens II 14-yard run (Randy Bond kick), 0:25. Aggies 38–27. Drive: 9 plays, 75 yards, 4:03.

Fourth quarter

- ARK – Jaden Platt 4-yard pass from Taylen Green (Taylen Green–Rohan Jones pass), 11:30. Aggies 38–35. Drive: 10 plays, 75 yards, 3:55.
- TA&M – Rueben Owens II 12-yard run (Randy Bond kick), 6:52. Aggies 45–35. Drive: 10 plays, 75 yards, 4:38.
- ARK – CJ Brown 4-yard pass from Taylen Green (Scott Starzyk kick), 0:10. Aggies 45–42. Drive: 12 plays, 93 yards, 3:41.

Statistics	TA&M	ARK
First downs	28	25
Plays–yards	67-497	65-527
Rushes–yards	34-217	32-268
Passing yards	280	259
Passing: comp–att–int	23-32-0	20-33-0
Turnovers	0	0
Time of possession	33:48	26:12

Team	Category	Player	Statistics
Texas A&M	Passing	Marcel Reed	23/32, 280 yards, 3 TD
Texas A&M	Rushing	Rueben Owens II	14 carries, 69 yards, 2 TD
Texas A&M	Receiving	Ashton Bethel-Roman	4 receptions, 83 yards, TD
Arkansas	Passing	Taylen Green	19/32, 256 yards, 3 TD
Arkansas	Rushing	Mike Washington Jr.	16 carries, 147 yards
Arkansas	Receiving	O'Mega Blake	7 receptions, 118 yards, TD

=== Auburn ===
Auburn Tigers (3–4) at Arkansas Razorbacks (2–5) – Game summary

Quarter	1	2	3	4	Total
Tigers	7	3	6	17	33
Razorbacks	0	21	3	0	24

at Donald W. Reynolds Razorback Stadium • Fayetteville, Arkansas

- Date: October 25
- Game time: 11:45 a.m.
- Game weather: Rain • Temperature: 59 °F (15 °C) • Wind: W 9 mph
- Game attendance: 68,922
- Referee: Lee Hedrick
- TV announcers (SECN): Dave Neal (play-by-play), Fozzy Whittaker (analyst), and Morgan Uber (sideline reporter)

Game information

First quarter

- AUB – Cam Coleman 23-yard pass from Jackson Arnold (Alex McPherson kick), 7:52. Auburn 7–0. Drive: 9 plays, 67 yards, 4:42.

Second quarter

- AUB – Alex McPherson 36-yard field goal, 12:05. Auburn 10–0. Drive: 15 plays, 76 yards, 7:46.
- ARK – Raylen Sharpe 58-yard pass from Taylen Green (Scott Starzyk kick), 8:36. Auburn 10–7. Drive: 6 plays, 83 yards, 3:22.
- ARK – Braylen Russell 2-yard run (Scott Starzyk kick), 5:24. Arkansas 14–10. Drive: 4 plays, 48 yards, 2:09.
- ARK – Kani Walker 89-yard interception return (Scott Starzyk kick), 0:48. Arkansas 21–10.

Third quarter

- AUB – Alex McPherson 23-yard field goal, 10:21. Arkansas 21–13. Drive: 9 plays, 46 yards, 4:30.
- AUB – Alex McPherson 43-yard field goal, 5:05. Arkansas 21–16. Drive: 6 plays, 18 yards, 3:50.
- ARK – Scott Starzyk 27-yard field goal, 0:57. Arkansas 24–16. Drive: 9 plays, 66 yards, 4:08.

Fourth quarter

- AUB – Alex McPherson 26-yard field goal, 12:03. Arkansas 24–19. Drive: 8 plays, 73 yards, 3:49.
- AUB – Rayshawn Pleasant 49-yard interception return (Ashton Daniels run), 9:15. Auburn 27–24.
- AUB – Alex McPherson 47-yard field goal, 6:23. Auburn 30–24. Drive: 4 plays, 5 yards, 2:10.
- AUB – Alex McPherson 37-yard field goal, 1:06. Auburn 33–24. Drive: 8 plays, 19 yards, 3:21.

Statistics	AUB	ARK
First downs	21	14
Plays–yards	70–380	45–331
Rushes–yards	50–230	23–63
Passing yards	150	268
Passing: comp–att–int	13–20–1	14–22–3
Turnovers	1	4
Time of possession	37:40	22:20

Team	Category	Player	Statistics
Auburn	Passing	Jackson Arnold	7/12, 73 yards, TD, INT
Auburn	Rushing	Jeremiah Cobb	28 carries, 153 yards
Auburn	Receiving	Malcolm Simmons	3 receptions, 17 yards
Arkansas	Passing	Taylen Green	14/22, 268 yards, TD, 3 INT
Arkansas	Rushing	Mike Washington Jr.	12 carries, 41 yards
Arkansas	Receiving	O'Mega Blake	6 receptions, 61 yards

=== Mississippi State ===
Mississippi State Bulldogs (4–4) at Arkansas Razorbacks (2–6) – Game summary

Quarter	1	2	3	4	Total
Bulldogs	7	0	14	17	38
Razorbacks	0	13	15	7	35

at Donald W. Reynolds Razorback Stadium • Fayetteville, Arkansas

- Date: November 1
- Game time: 3:00 p.m.
- Game weather:
- Game attendance: 68,358
- Referee: Kyle Olson
- TV announcers (SEC Network): Tom Hart (play-by-play), Jordan Rodgers (analyst), Cole Cubelic (sideline)

Game information

First quarter

- (7:06) MSST – Davon Booth 8-yard pass from Blake Shapen (Kyle Ferrie kick) (Drive: 12 plays, 80 yards, 4:33; Mississippi State 7–0)

Second quarter

- (13:54) ARK – Rohan Jones 3-yard pass from Taylen Green (Scott Starzyk kick) (Drive: 9 plays, 56 yards, 4:18; 7–7)
- (7:32) ARK – Scott Starzyk 42-yard field goal (Drive: 11 plays, 56 yards, 4:34; Arkansas 10–7)
- (0:01) ARK – Scott Starzyk 30-yard field goal (Drive: 13 plays, 85 yards, 3:56; Arkansas 13–7)

Third quarter

- (13:43) MSST – Anthony Evans III 45-yard pass from Kamario Taylor (Kyle Ferrie kick) (Drive: 4 plays, 75 yards, 1:17; Mississippi State 14–13)
- (9:23) ARK – Taylen Green 8-yard run (Scott Starzyk kick) (Drive: 9 plays, 75 yards, 4:20; Arkansas 20–14)
- (6:18) ARK – Mike Washington Jr. 20-yard run (Taylen Green pass to Rohan Jones for two-point conversion) (Drive: 2 plays, 61 yards, 0:31; Arkansas 28–14)
- (4:49) MSST – Kamario Taylor 20-yard run (Kyle Ferrie kick) (Drive: 4 plays, 45 yards, 1:25; Arkansas 28–21)

Fourth quarter

- (13:43) ARK – Braylen Russell 2-yard run (Scott Starzyk kick) (Drive: 7 plays, 41 yards, 3:37; Arkansas 35–21)
- (10:16) MSST – Davon Booth 2-yard run (Kyle Ferrie kick) (Drive: 9 plays, 75 yards, 3:27; Arkansas 35–28)
- (5:07) MSST – Kyle Ferrie 46-yard field goal (Drive: 8 plays, 43 yards, 3:22; Arkansas 35–31)
- (0:48) MSST – Anthony Evans III 18-yard pass from Blake Shapen (Kyle Ferrie kick) (Drive: 10 plays, 69 yards, 2:20; Mississippi State 38–35)

Statistics	MSST	ARK
First downs	21	24
Plays–yards	71–388	77–433
Rushes–yards	38–106	46–239
Passing yards	282	194
Passing: comp–att–int	16–28–1	19–31–0
Turnovers	1	0
Time of possession	25:39	34:21

Team	Category	Player	Statistics
Mississippi State	Passing	Blake Shapen	16–28, 242 yards, 2 TD, INT
Mississippi State	Rushing	Kamario Taylor	6 carries, 55 yards, TD
Mississippi State	Receiving	Anthony Evans III	5 receptions, 111 yards, 2 TD
Arkansas	Passing	Taylen Green	19–31, 194 yards, TD
Arkansas	Rushing	Mike Washington Jr.	19 carries, 116 yards, TD
Arkansas	Receiving	Rohan Jones	4 receptions, 65 yards

=== at LSU (Battle for the Boot) ===
Arkansas Razorbacks (2–7) at LSU Tigers (5–4) – Game summary

Quarter	1	2	3	4	Total
Razorbacks	14	0	8	0	22
LSU Tigers	0	16	0	7	23

at Tiger Stadium • Baton Rouge, Louisiana

- Date: November 15
- Game time: 11:45 a.m.
- Game weather:
- Game attendance: 100,212
- Referee: Kyle Olson
- TV announcers (SEC Network): Tom Hart (play-by-play), Jordan Rodgers (analyst), Cole Cubelic (sideline)

Game information

First quarter

- (10:58) ARK – Caleb Wooden 16-yard blocked punt return (Scott Starzyk kick) (Drive: 3 plays, 5 yards, 1:29; Arkansas 7–0)
- (4:06) ARK – Taylen Green 11-yard run (Scott Starzyk kick) (Drive: 11 plays, 52 yards, 5:50; Arkansas 14–0)

Second quarter

- (14:54) LSU – Caden Durham 27-yard run (Damian Ramos kick) (Drive: 9 plays, 75 yards, 4:12; Arkansas 14–7)
- (7:02) LSU – Damian Ramos 50-yard field goal (Drive: 10 plays, 49 yards, 5:55; Arkansas 14–10)
- (5:08) LSU – Damian Ramos 42-yard field goal (Drive: 4 plays, 5 yards, 1:47; Arkansas 14–13)
- (0:03) LSU – Damian Ramos 42-yard field goal (Drive: 5 plays, 55 yards, 0:30; LSU 16–14)

Third quarter

- (4:02) ARK – Mike Washington Jr. 9-yard run (Taylen Green run for two-point conversion) (Drive: 5 plays, 39 yards, 1:58; Arkansas 22–16)

Fourth quarter

- (7:53) LSU – Bauer Sharp 12-yard pass from Michael Van Buren Jr. (Damian Ramos kick) (Drive: 12 plays, 92 yards, 6:17; LSU 23–22)

Statistics	ARK	LSU
First downs	16	21
Plays–yards	70–340	54–390
Rushes–yards	35–175	37–155
Passing yards	165	221
Passing: comp–att–int	11–19–2	21–31–0
Turnovers	2	0
Time of possession	25:15	34:45

Team	Category	Player	Statistics
Arkansas	Passing	Taylen Green	11/19, 165 yards, 2 INT
Arkansas	Rushing	Mike Washington Jr.	13 carries, 85 yards, TD
Arkansas	Receiving	Raylen Sharpe	4 receptions, 65 yards
LSU	Passing	Michael Van Buren Jr.	21/31, 221 yards, TD
LSU	Rushing	Caden Durham	12 carries, 65 yards, TD
LSU	Receiving	Bauer Sharp	1 reception, 12 yards, TD

=== at No. 17 Texas (rivalry) ===
Arkansas Razorbacks (2–8) at No. 17 Texas Longhorns (7–3) – Game summary

Quarter	1	2	3	4	Total
Razorbacks	6	14	3	14	37
No. 17 Longhorns	14	10	21	7	52

at Darrell K Royal–Texas Memorial Stadium • Austin, Texas

- Date: November 22
- Game time: 2:30 p.m.
- Game weather:
- Game attendance: 102,361
- Referee: Kyle Olson
- TV announcers (ABC): Joe Tessitore (play-by-play), Jesse Palmer (analyst) and Katie George (sideline)

Game information

First quarter

- (13:11) ARK – Scott Starzyk 51-yard field goal (Drive: 5 plays, 42 yards, 1:49; Arkansas 3–0)
- (11:29) TEX – DeAndre Moore Jr. 46-yard pass from Arch Manning (Mason Shipley kick) (Drive: 4 plays, 81 yards, 1:35; Texas 7–3)
- (7:34) ARK – Scott Starzyk 33-yard field goal (Drive: 7 plays, 60 yards, 3:55; Texas 7–6)
- (2:32) TEX – Parker Livingstone 4-yard pass from Arch Manning (Mason Shipley kick) (Drive: 10 plays, 75 yards, 5:02; Texas 14–6)

Second quarter

- (14:09) ARK – Mike Washington Jr. 22-yard run (Scott Starzyk kick) (Drive: 7 plays, 75 yards, 3:23; Texas 14–13)
- (12:26) TEX – Parker Livingstone 54-yard pass from Arch Manning (Mason Shipley kick) (Drive: 5 plays, 75 yards, 1:43; Texas 21–13)
- (7:24) ARK – Taylen Green 4-yard run (Scott Starzyk kick) (Drive: 11 plays, 75 yards, 5:02; Texas 21–20)
- (0:00) TEX – Mason Shipley 44-yard field goal (Drive: 4 plays, 9 yards, 0:50; Texas 24–20)

Third quarter

- (12:32) TEX – Arch Manning 3-yard run (Mason Shipley kick) (Drive: 5 plays, 75 yards, 2:28; Texas 31–20)
- (7:05) TEX – DeAndre Moore Jr. 8-yard pass from Arch Manning (Mason Shipley kick) (Drive: 7 plays, 38 yards, 2:36; Texas 38–20)
- (2:18) ARK – Scott Starzyk 33-yard field goal (Drive: 13 plays, 60 yards, 4:47; Texas 38–23)
- (0:50) TEX – DeAndre Moore Jr. 20-yard pass from Arch Manning (Mason Shipley kick) (Drive: 5 plays, 75 yards, 1:28; Texas 45–23)

Fourth quarter

- (11:30) TEX – Liona Lefau 52-yard fumble return (Mason Shipley kick) (Drive: 10 plays, 44 yards, 1:28; Texas 52–23)
- (7:46) ARK – KJ Jackson 12-yard run (Scott Starzyk kick) (Drive: 10 plays, 75 yards, 3:44; Texas 52–30)
- (0:16) ARK – Jaden Platt 8-yard pass from KJ Jackson (Scott Starzyk kick) (Drive: 9 plays, 92 yards, 1:50; Texas 52–37)

Statistics	ARK	TEX
First downs	29	22
Plays–yards	80–512	59–490
Rushes–yards	31–188	28–97
Passing yards	324	393
Passing: comp–att–int	26–49–1	19–31–0
Turnovers	2	0
Time of possession	34:17	24:53

Team	Category	Player	Statistics
Arkansas	Passing	KJ Jackson	16–29, 206 yards, TD
Arkansas	Rushing	Mike Washington Jr.	17 carries, 105 yards, TD
Arkansas	Receiving	Rohan Jones	5 receptions, 72 yards
Texas	Passing	Arch Manning	18–30, 389 yards, 4 TD
Texas	Rushing	Quintrevion Wisner	15 carries, 67 yards
Texas	Receiving	Parker Livingstone	2 receptions, 104 yards, TD

=== No. 22 Missouri (Battle Line Rivalry) ===
No. 22 Missouri Tigers (7–4) at Arkansas Razorbacks (2–9) – Game summary

Quarter	1	2	3	4	Total
No. 22 Tigers	7	7	6	11	31
Razorbacks	7	10	0	0	17

at Donald W. Reynolds Razorback Stadium • Fayetteville, Arkansas

- Date: November 29
- Game time: 2:30 p.m.
- Game weather:
- Game attendance: 61,508
- Referee: Daniel Gautreaux
- TV announcers (SECN): Dave Neal (play-by-play), Fozzy Whittaker (analyst) and Morgan Uber (sideline)

Game information

First quarter

- MIZ – Jamal Roberts 4-yard run (Oliver Robbins kick), 13:25. Tigers 7–0. Drive: 3 plays, 58 yards, 1:27.
- ARK – O'Mega Blake 16-yard pass from KJ Jackson (Scott Starzyk kick), 2:20. Tied 7–7. Drive: 12 plays, 73 yards, 4:52.

Second quarter

- ARK – Bradley Shaw 32-yard fumble return (Scott Starzyk kick), 14:12. Razorbacks 14–7.
- MIZ – Beau Pribula 11-yard run (Oliver Robbins kick), 9:33. Tied 14–14. Drive: 9 plays, 75 yards, 4:39.
- ARK – Scott Starzyk 28-yard field goal, 0:11. Razorbacks 17–14. Drive: 6 plays, 12 yards, 1:04.

Third quarter

- MIZ – Ahmad Hardy 53-yard run (pass failed), 11:57. Tigers 20–17. Drive: 4 plays, 62 yards, 1:30.

Fourth quarter

- MIZ – Oliver Robbins 41-yard field goal, 9:56. Tigers 23–17. Drive: 12 plays, 61 yards, 6:41.
- MIZ – Kevin Coleman Jr. 67-yard punt return (Jamal Roberts run), 8:07. Tigers 31–17.

Statistics	MIZ	ARK
First downs	26	15
Plays–yards	65–347	42–246
Rushes–yards	58–322	25–61
Passing yards	25	185
Passing: comp–att–int	4–7–0	17–30–0
Turnovers	1	0
Time of possession	34:03	25:57

Team	Category	Player	Statistics
Missouri	Passing	Beau Pribula	4/7, 25 yards
Missouri	Rushing	Ahmad Hardy	27 carries, 157 yards, TD
Missouri	Receiving	Brett Norfleet	2 receptions, 13 yards
Arkansas	Passing	KJ Jackson	11/17, 126 yards, TD
Arkansas	Rushing	Mike Washington Jr.	11 carries, 50 yards
Arkansas	Receiving	O'Mega Blake	4 receptions, 53 yards, TD

== Personnel ==
=== Coaching staff ===
Arkansas Razorbacks coaches
Coach	Position	Year	Alma mater
Sam Pittman	Head coach (Fired after week 5)	6th	Pittsburg State (1986)
Scott Fountain	Assistant head coach/special teams coordinator	6th	Samford (1988)
Bobby Petrino	Offensive coordinator (Weeks 1–5), Interim Head Coach/quarterbacks coach	2nd	Carroll College (1983)
Travis Williams	Defensive coordinator/linebackers coach (Fired after week 5)	3rd	Auburn (2005)
Marcus Woodson	co-Defensive coordinator/safeties coach (Fired after week 5)	3rd	Ole Miss (2003)
Che Hendrix	Interim safeties coach	1st	Abilene Christian (2000)
Morgan Turner	Tight ends coach	3rd	Illinois (2009)
Eric Mateos	Offensive line coach	2nd	Southwest Baptist (2011)
Ronnie Fouch	Wide receivers coach	2nd	Indiana State (2012)
Kolby Smith	Interim Offensive coordinator/Running backs coach	2nd	Louisville (2006)
Deke Adams	Defensive line coach (Fired after week 5)	4th	Southern Miss (1995)
Jay Hayes	Interim Defensive line coach	1st	Idaho (1982)
Chris Wilson	Interim Defensive coordinator/Assistant Defensive line coach	1st	Oklahoma (1992)
Nick Perry	Defensive backs coach	1st	Alabama (2015)
Ben Sowders	Strength and conditioning coach	3rd	Western Kentucky (2008)

=== Recruits ===
Arkansas signed a total of 24 players in the 2025 recruiting class, 21 from high school and three from junior college.

4☆ LB Tavion Wallace 6’1” 215 lbs. Jesup, GA.

4☆ DT Kevin Oatis 6’2” 295 lbs. Hattiesburg, MS.

4☆ QB Grayson Wilson 6’3” 205 lbs. Conway, AR.

4☆ WR Ja’Kayden Ferguson 6’3” 175 lbs. Missouri City, TX.

4☆ DL Reginald Vaughn 6’2” 260 lbs. Flowood, MS.

3☆ WR Antonio Jordan 6’6” 230 lbs. Warren, AR.

3☆ LB Jayden Shelton 6’1” 200 lbs. Dallas, TX.

3☆ DB Taijh Overton 6’1” 180 lbs. Mobile, AL.

3☆ TE Gavin Garretson 6’7” 240 lbs. Chico, CA.

3☆ RB Markeylin Batton 5’11” 180 lbs. Atlanta, GA.

3☆ RB Cameron Settles 5’11” 195 lbs. Little Rock, AR.

3☆ ATH Nigel Pringle 6’2” 180 lbs. Houston, TX.

3☆ DT Caleb Bell 6’3” 275 lbs. Alpharetta, GA.

3☆ DE Trent Sellers 6’6” 240 lbs. Mobile, AL.

3☆ DE Keiundra Johnson 6’3” 230 lbs. Terrell, TX.

3☆ OL Lionel Prudhomme 6’3” 295 lbs. Shreveport, LA.

3☆ OL Kash Courtney 6’4” 285 lbs. Carthage, TX.

3☆ OL Blake Cherry 6’6” 305 lbs. Owasso, OK.

3☆ PK Scott Starzyk 5’10” 160 lbs. The Woodlands, TX.

3☆ CB Keshawn Davila 6’1” 170 lbs. Tampa, FL – NW Mississippi C.C.

3☆ OL Bubba Craig 6’8” 320 lbs. Ft. Wayne, IN. – Hutchinson, KS. C.C.

3☆ TE Jeremiah Beck 6'4" 240 lbs. Fontana, CA. - Chaffey College, CA.

=== Transfers ===
==== Outgoing ====
The Razorbacks lost 42 players to the NCAA transfer portal.

Player	Number	Position	Height	Weight	Class	Hometown	New school
Jezreel Bachert	#28	RB	6'1"	216	(redshirt) Sophomore	Big Sandy, Texas	Ouachita Baptist
Kamron Bibby	#87	WR	6'2"	187	(redshirt) Sophomore	El Dorado, Arkansas	Central Arkansas
Blake Boda	#16	QB	6'4"	200	(redshirt) Freshman	Daytona Beach, Florida	
Joshua Braun	#72	OL	6'6"	338	(redshirt) Senior	Live Oak, Florida	Kentucky
Jaylon Braxton	#11	DB	6'0"	190	Sophomore	Frisco, Texas	Ole Miss
Selman Bridges	#2	DB	6'2"	175	Freshman	Temple, Texas	Withdrew
Jace Brown		WR	6'4"	200	Freshman	Long Beach, California	UCLA
Khafre Brown	#89	WR	6'0"	190	Senior	Charlotte, North Carolina	
Vito Calvaruso	#90	K	6'3"	206	(redshirt) Senior	Jefferson City, Missouri	
Emmanuel Crawford	#21	RB	5'10"	175	(redshirt) Freshman	Grove, Oklahoma	Central Oklahoma
Ty'Kieast Crawford	#53	OL	6'5"	324	Senior	Carthage, Texas	West Virginia
Nico Davillier	#0	DL	6'4"	271	Junior	Maumelle, Arkansas	UCLA
Carson Dean	#23	LB	6'4"	234	(redshirt) Freshman	Frisco, Texas	Purdue
Davion Dozier	#88	WR	6'4"	204	(redshirt) Freshman	Moody, Alabama	Appalachian State
Rashod Dubinion	#7	RB	5'10"	201	Junior	Ellenwood, Georgia	Appalachian State
Sam Dubwig	#95	P	6'3"	231	Freshman	Cabot, Arkansas	Purdue
Shamar Easter	#80	TE/WR	6'5"	220	Sophomore	Ashdown, Arkansas	North Carolina
Christian Ford	#26	S	6'0"	185	Sophomore	McKinney, Texas	Missouri State
Var'keyes Gumms	#30	TE	6'3"	242	(redshirt) Sophomore	Houston, Texas	UNLV
Dylan Hasz	#33	DB	5'11"	190	Sophomore	Bixby, Oklahoma	Appalachian State
Luke Hasz	#9	TE	6'3"	241	Sophomore	Bixby, Oklahoma	Ole Miss
Kaden Henley	#44	LB	6'3"	236	(redshirt) Sophomore	Springdale, Arkansas	Harding
Madden Iamaleava		QB	6'3"	200	Freshman	Long Beach, California	UCLA
Dazmin James	#83	WR	6'2"	196	(redshirt) Freshman	Clayton, North Carolina	California
Patrick Kutas	#75	OL	6'5"	313	Junior	Memphis, Tennessee	Ole Miss
Austin Ledbetter	#19	QB	6'1"	213	Junior	Bryant, Arkansas	Henderson State
Zuri Madison	#57	OL	6'5"	280	(redshirt) Freshman	Lexington, Kentucky	Arkansas State
Tevis Metcalf	#24	DB	5'10"	192	Freshman	Clay, Alabama	Michigan
TJ Metcalf	#18	DB	6'1"	200	Sophomore	Birmingham, Alabama	Michigan
Quentin Murphy	#19	S	6'1"	205	Freshman	Little Rock, Arkansas	Louisiana–Monroe
Addison Nichols	#63	OL	6'5"	329	(redshirt) Sophomore	Norcross, Georgia	SMU
Julius Pope		LB	6'0"	195	Freshman	Batesville, Mississippi	
Tyrell Reed Jr.	#29	RB	5'9"	195	Sophomore	Topeka, Kansas	Louisiana–Monroe
Braylen Russell	#0	RB	6'1"	253	Freshman	Benton, Arkansas	Withdrew
Alex Sanford	#20	LB	6'1"	225	Sophomore	Oxford, Mississippi	Purdue
Isaiah Sategna III	#6	WR	5'11"	185	(redshirt) Sophomore	Fayetteville, Arkansas	Oklahoma
Malachi Singleton	#3	QB	6'1"	225	(redshirt) Freshman	Kennesaw, Georgia	Purdue
Brad Spence	#22	LB	6'2"	238	Sophomore	Houston, Texas	Texas
Eli Stein	#48	LS	6'3"	231	Sophomore	Cambridge, Wisconsin	Wisconsin
Ty Washington	#8	TE	6'4"	247	(redshirt) Freshman	Leesburg, Georgia	Notre Dame
Amaury Wiggins	#56	OL	6'3"	310	(redshirt) Sophomore	Pensacola, Florida	South Alabama
Jaedon Wilson	#1	WR	6'3"	178	(redshirt) Junior	DeSoto, Texas	UCLA
Dallas Young	#19	DB	6'0"	196	(redshirt) Freshman	Gardendale, Alabama	South Alabama
Brooks Yurachek	#35	LB	6'1"	225	(redshirt) Freshman	Fayetteville, Arkansas	Appalachian State

==== Incoming ====
The Razorbacks added 25 players from the transfer portal between December 9 and December 28, 2024. They also added 10 players from the portal between April 16 and May 4, 2025, for a total of 34.

Player	Number	Position	Height	Weight	Class	Hometown	Previous school
Jeremiah Beck	#33	TE	6'4"	235	Junior	Fontana, California	Chaffey College
Justus Boone	#0	DL	6'4"	266	(redshirt) Senior	Sumter, South Carolina	Florida
O'Mega Blake	#9	WR	6'2"	180	(redshirt) Senior	Rock Hill, South Carolina	Charlotte
Kavion Broussard	#75	OL	6'6"	290	(redshirt) Freshman	New Iberia, Louisiana	Ole Miss
Jalen Brown	#17	WR	6'1"	174	(redshirt) Sophomore	Miami, Florida	Florida State
Ismael Cisse	#84	WR	6'0"	200	(redshirt) Sophomore	Denver, Colorado	Stanford
Bubba Craig	#78	OL	6'8"	320	(redshirt) Sophomore	Fort Wayne, Indiana	Hutchinson CC
Courtney Crutchfield	#2	WR	6'2"	180	(redshirt) Freshman	Pine Bluff, Arkansas	Missouri
Keshawn Davila	#21	DB	6'1"	165	Junior	Tampa, Florida	Northwest Mississippi CC
Marcus Dumervil	#74	OL	6'5"	305	(redshirt) Senior	Lauderdale Lakes, Florida	Maryland
Blake Ford	#40	K	6'1"	213	(redshirt) Junior	Arlington, Texas	North Texas
AJ Green	#20	RB	5'10"	210	(redshirt) Senior	Tulsa, Oklahoma	Oklahoma State
Andrew Harris	#24	LB	6'2"	223	Junior	Altamonte Springs, Florida	UCF
Trever Jackson	#13	QB	6'3"	190	(redshirt) Freshman	Winter Garden, Florida	Florida State
Andy Jean	#14	WR	6'1"	185	(redshirt) Sophomore	Miami, Florida	Florida
Rohan Jones	#88	TE	6'3"	235	Senior	Montreal, Quebec	Montana State
Caden Kitler	#52	OL	6'3"	295	(redshirt) Junior	The Colony, Texas	UCF
Phillip Lee	#1	DE	6'4"	240	(redshirt) Senior	Jacksonville, Florida	Troy
Brayson McHenry	#18	QB	6'0"	206	(redshirt) Junior	Texarkana, Texas	Baylor
Shaq McRoy	#71	OL	6'8"	375	(redshirt) Freshman	Bessemer, Alabama	Oregon
Frank Mulipola	#44	DL	6'4"	275	(redshirt) Senior	Pago Pago, American Samoa	Texas Permian Basin
Julian Neal	#23	CB	6'2"	200	(redshirt) Senior	San Francisco, California	Stanford
David Oke	#92	DL	6'2"	290	Senior	Lagos, Nigeria	Abilene Christian
Jaden Platt	#83	TE	6'5"	250	(redshirt) Sophomore	Haslet, Texas	Texas A&M
Corey Robinson II	#51	OL	6'5"	305	(redshirt) Senior	Roswell, Georgia	Georgia Tech
Quentavius Scandrett	#8	DB	6'3"	200	Senior	Clayton, Georgia	Eastern Michigan
Kam Shanks	#15	WR	5'8"	180	(redshirt) Sophomore	Prattville, Alabama	UAB
Raylen Sharpe	#6	WR	5'9"	165	(redshirt) Senior	Allen, Texas	Fresno State
Shakur Smalls	#19	S	6'0"	205	(redshirt) Senior	Philadelphia, Pennsylvania	Maine
Ken Talley	#11	DL	6'3"	256	(redshirt) Junior	North Philadelphia, Pennsylvania	Michigan State
Kani Walker	#13	DB	6'2"	206	(redshirt) Senior	Atlanta, Georgia	Oklahoma
Mike Washington Jr.	#4	RB	6'2"	215	Senior	Utica, New York	New Mexico State
Trent Whalen	#26	LB	6'3"	235	(redshirt) Senior	Las Vegas, Nevada	Kent State
Caleb Wooden	#22	DB	6'1"	192	Senior	Lawrenceville, Georgia	Auburn
Jordan Young	#4	DB	6'0"	197	(redshirt) Senior	Tampa, Florida	Cincinnati

=== Depth chart ===
Defense

S
4 Jordan Young
19 Shakur Smalls
27 Ahkhari Johnson

FS
22 Caleb Wooden
16 Miguel Mitchell
8 Quentavius Scandrett

WLB	SLB
10 Xavian Sorey	14 Stephen Dix Jr.
26 Trent Whalen	7 Bradley Shaw
25 Tavion Wallace	24 Andrew Harris

SS
3 Larry Worth III
20 JJ Shelton
47 Braylon Watson

CB
23 Julian Neal
21 Keshawn Davila
2 Selman Bridges

DE	DT	DT	DE
97 Quincy Rhodes Jr.	5 Cameron Ball	95 Ian Geffrard	0 Justus Boone
9 Charlie Collins	91 Kevin Oatis	88 Danny Saili	1 Phillip Lee
11 Ken Talley	54 Keyshawn Blackstock	92 David Oke	6 Kavion Henderson

CB
13 Kani Walker
15 Jaheim Singletary
17 Nigel Pringle

Offense

WR
6 Raylen Sharpe
14 Andy Jean
—

WR
9 O'Mega Blake
15 Kam Shanks
18 Krosse Johnson

LT	LG	C	RG	RT
51 Corey Robinson II	55 Fernando Carmona	52 Caden Kitler	50 Kobe Branham	76 E'Marion Harris
75 Kavion Broussard	70 Blake Cherry	53 Kash Courtney	74 Marcus Dumervil	71 Shaq McRoy
—	—	73 Brooks Edmonson	56 LJ Prudhomme	—

TE
83 Jaden Platt
88 Rohan Jones
—

WR
3 CJ Brown
2 Courtney Crutchfield
5 Ja'Kayden Ferguson

QB
10 Taylen Green
7 KJ Jackson
13 Trever Jackson

Key reserves
Out (season)
WR 16 Ismael Cisse (injured)
TE 81 Andreas Paaske (injured)
QB 8 Grayson Wilson
RB 20 AJ Green
DE 93 Keiundre Johnson
DE 52 Donovan Whitten
DE 44 Frank Mulipola
DE 43 Trent Sellers
DT 94 Reginald Vaughn
DT 99 Kaleb James
DT 90 Caleb Bell
SLB 42 Wyatt Simmons
CB 32 Landon Phipps
SS 38 Anton Pierce

Special teams
PK 80 Scott Starzyk
PK 40 Blake Ford
P 37 Devin Bale
P 36 Gavin Rush
KR 1 Rodney Hill
PR 15 Kam Shanks
LS 30 Ashton Ngo
H 37 Devin Bale

RB
4 Mike Washington Jr.
0 Braylen Russell
1 Rodney Hill

As of October 26, 2025. Depth chart
