= Marco Jones =

American football player (born 2006)

No. 10 – Texas A&M Aggies
- Position: Defensive end
- Class: Sophomore

Personal information
- Born: December 19, 2006 (age 19)
- Listed height: 6 ft 5 in (1.96 m)
- Listed weight: 261 lb (118 kg)

Career information
- High school: San Ramon Valley (Danville, California)
- College: Texas A&M (2025–present)
- Stats at ESPN

Marco Jones (born December 19, 2006) is an American college football defensive end for the Texas A&M Aggies.

== Early life ==
Jones attended San Ramon Valley High School in Danville, California, where he played football and baseball. During his high school football career he had 440 tackles, 14 sacks and six interceptions. Jones was selected to play in the 2025 Navy All-American Bowl. He committed to Texas A&M University to play college football and college baseball.

== College career ==
Jones played in all 13 games his first year at Texas A&M in 2025, recording 21 tackles and 2.5 sacks. He was also a member of the Texas A&M Aggies baseball|Aggies baseball team, but did not appear in a game. Jones returned to Texas A&M in 2026 as a starter. In his second game of the season against Arizona State, he had a sack and returned an interception 55 yards for at touchdown.
