= Brady Hart =

American football player (born 2008)

No. 13 – Texas A&M Aggies
- Position: Quarterback
- Class: (redshirt) Freshman

Personal information
- Born: January 4, 2008 (age 18)
- Listed height: 6 ft 4 in (1.93 m)
- Listed weight: 200 lb (91 kg)

Career information
- High school: Cocoa (Cocoa, Florida)
- College: Texas A&M (2025–present)
- Stats at ESPN

Brady Hart is an American college football quarterback for the Texas A&M Aggies.

== Early life ==
Hart attended Cocoa High School in Cocoa, Florida. As a sophomore, he completed 288 of 437 passes for 3,759 yards and 41 touchdowns as he helped lead Cocoa to a 14-1 record and a state championship. As a junior he led Cocoa to a third-straight state championship and threw for 4,360 yards and 40 touchdowns. Hart was rated as a four-star recruit by ESPN and 247Sports and initially committed to play college football for the Michigan Wolverines over offers from Clemson, Florida, Miami, LSU, Ohio State, and Texas A&M. However, he flipped his commitment to play for the Texas A&M Aggies, while reclassifying to skip his senior year and enroll early with the Aggies.

== College career ==
As a freshman in 2025, Hart completed five of ten pass attempts for 62 yards. In week 7 of the 2026 season, Hart come in and threw for a touchdown in a win over The Citadel. In week 12, he was named the team's starting quarterback for their matchup versus Oklahoma after Marcel Reed was benched.
