= 2026 Arkansas Razorbacks football team =

American college football season

2026 Arkansas Razorbacks football
- Conference: Southeastern Conference
- Record: 4–7 (2–6 SEC)
- Head coach: Ryan Silverfield (1st season)
- Offensive coordinator: Tim Cramsey (1st season)
- Offensive scheme: Pro spread
- Defensive coordinator: Ron Roberts (1st season)
- Co-defensive coordinator: Deron Wilson (1st season)
- Base defense: 3–3–5
- Home stadium: Donald W. Reynolds Razorback Stadium

2026 Southeastern Conference football standings
	Conf.			Overall
Team	W		L	W		L
No. 1 Georgia y	8	–	1	10	–	1
No. 5 Texas	6	–	2	9	–	2
No. 9 Tennessee	6	–	2	9	–	2
No. 3 Alabama	6	–	2	9	–	2
No. 22 Oklahoma	5	–	3	7	–	4
No. 24 Florida	5	–	4	7	–	4
No. 16 Kentucky	5	–	4	7	–	4
No. 25 Ole Miss	4	–	4	7	–	4
Auburn	4	–	4	7	–	4
Missouri	4	–	4	7	–	4
No. 21 South Carolina	4	–	5	6	–	5
LSU	3	–	5	6	–	5
Mississippi State	2	–	6	5	–	6
Arkansas	2	–	6	4	–	7
Texas A&M	1	–	7	4	–	7
Vanderbilt	1	–	7	4	–	7
Championship: Georgia vs TBD
^ – College Football Playoff participant; $ – Conference champion; y – Championship game participant; As of November 22, 2026; Rankings from CFP rankings

The 2026 Arkansas Razorbacks football team represents the University of Arkansas as a member of the Southeastern Conference (SEC) during the 2026 NCAA Division I FBS football season. Led by first-year head coach Ryan Silverfield, the Razorbacks will play seven home games at Donald W. Reynolds Razorback Stadium in Fayetteville, Arkansas.

== Schedule ==
Date	Time	Opponent	Site	TV	Result	Attendance
September 5	3:15 p.m.	North Alabama*	Donald W. Reynolds Razorback Stadium; Fayetteville, AR	SECN	W 31–14	69,178
September 12	9:15 p.m.	at No. 20 Utah*	Rice–Eccles Stadium; Salt Lake City, UT	ESPN	L 10–43	51,532
September 19	11:00 a.m.	No. 2 Georgia	Donald W. Reynolds Razorback Stadium; Fayetteville, AR	ABC	L 17–45	66,123
September 26	7:00 p.m.	Tulsa*	Donald W. Reynolds Razorback Stadium; Fayetteville, AR	SECN+	W 34–6	72,890
October 3	6:00 p.m.	at Texas A&M	Kyle Field; College Station, TX (Southwest Classic)	ESPN2	L 7–34	108,657
October 10	3:15 p.m.	No. 15 Tennessee	Donald W. Reynolds Razorback Stadium; Fayetteville, AR	SECN	L 17–24	69,038
October 17	6:00 p.m.	at Vanderbilt	FirstBank Stadium; Nashville, TN	ESPN2	W 31–21	35,000
October 31	6:45 p.m.	No. 23 Missouri	Donald W. Reynolds Razorback Stadium; Fayetteville, AR (Battle Line Rivalry)	SECN	L 10–34	65,117
November 7	11:45 a.m.	at Auburn	Jordan–Hare Stadium; Auburn, AL	SECN	L 23–26	88,043
November 14	6:45 p.m.	No. 17 South Carolina	Donald W. Reynolds Razorback Stadium; Fayetteville, AR	SECN	W 34–6	63,334
November 21	2:30 p.m.	at No. 5 Texas	Darrell K Royal–Texas Memorial Stadium; Austin, TX (rivalry)	ESPN	L 3–45	103,508
November 28	11:45 a.m.	LSU	Donald W. Reynolds Razorback Stadium; Fayetteville, AR (Battle for the Golden Boot)	SECN		
*Non-conference game; Rankings from AP Poll (and CFP Rankings, after November 3) - Released prior to game; All times are in Central time

== Game summaries ==
=== vs North Alabama (FCS) ===
North Alabama Lions (FCS) (1–0) at Arkansas Razorbacks (0–0) – Game summary

Quarter	1	2	3	4	Total
Lions (FCS)	0	0	7	7	14
Razorbacks	7	7	7	10	31

at Donald W. Reynolds Razorback Stadium • Fayetteville, Arkansas

- Date: September 5
- Game time: 3:15 p.m. CDT
- Game weather: Sunny • Temperature: 101 °F (38 °C) • Wind: SW at 5 miles per hour (8.0 km/h)
- Game attendance: 69,178
- Referee: Ted Pitts
- TV announcers (SECN): Dave Neal (play-by-play), Cole Cubelic (analyst), and Tori Petry (sideline reporter)

Game information

First quarter

- (0:36) ARK – Ismael Cisse 20-yard pass from KJ Jackson, Max Gilbert kick (Drive: 7 plays, 67 yards, 2:25; Arkansas 7–0)

Second quarter

- (8:41) ARK – Matt Adcock 2-yard pass from KJ Jackson, Max Gilbert kick (Drive: 11 plays, 65 yards, 5:23; Arkansas 14–0)

Third quarter

- (6:49) ARK – Jaden Platt 10-yard pass from KJ Jackson, Max Gilbert kick (Drive: 12 plays, 73 yards, 6:19; Arkansas 21–0)
- (2:10) UNA – Destin Wade 6-yard run, Ian Vachon kick (Drive: 4 plays, 35 yards, 1:18; Arkansas 21–7)

Fourth quarter

- (11:58) ARK – Braylen Russell 1-yard run, Max Gilbert kick (Drive: 11 plays, 75 yards, 5:12; Arkansas 28–7)
- (10:24) UNA – Destin Wade 4-yard run, Ian Vachon kick (Drive: 4 plays, 75 yards, 1:34; Arkansas 28–14)
- (2:59) ARK – Max Gilbert 33-yard field goal (Drive: 13 plays, 60 yards, 7:25; Arkansas 31–14)

Statistics	UNA	ARK
First downs	7	29
Plays–yards	44–153	84–415
Rushes–yards	20–40	49–148
Passing yards	113	267
Passing: comp–att–int	12–24–0	24–35–1
Turnovers	1	3
Time of possession	18:35	41:25

Team	Category	Player	Statistics
North Alabama	Passing	Destin Wade	12/23, 113 yards
North Alabama	Rushing	Jalen Fletcher	4 carries, 24 yards
North Alabama	Receiving	Xavier Johnson	6 receptions, 82 yards
Arkansas	Passing	KJ Jackson	24/35, 267 yards, 3 TD, INT
Arkansas	Rushing	Braylen Russell	17 carries, 49 yards, TD
Arkansas	Receiving	Chris Marshall	7 receptions, 79 yards

=== at No. 20 Utah ===
Arkansas Razorbacks (1–0) at No. 20 Utah Utes (1–0) – Game summary

Quarter	1	2	3	4	Total
Razorbacks	3	0	0	7	10
No. 20 Utes	7	22	7	7	43

at Rice–Eccles Stadium • Salt Lake City, Utah

- Date: September 12
- Game time: 9:15 p.m. CDT
- Game weather: Clear • Temperature: 81 °F (27 °C) • Wind: E at 6 miles per hour (9.7 km/h)
- Game attendance: 51,532
- Referee: Luke Richmond
- TV announcers (ESPN): Justin Kutcher (play-by-play), Roddy Jones (analyst), and Quint Kessenich (sideline reporter)

Game information

First quarter

- ARK – Max Gilbert 29-yard field goal, 7:44. Razorbacks 3–0. Drive: 14 plays, 64 yards, 7:16.
- UTAH – Wayshawn Parker 1-yard run (Dillon Curtis kick), 3:39. Utes 7–3. Drive: 10 plays, 75 yards, 4:05.

Second quarter

- UTAH – Devon Dampier 7-yard run (Mana Carvalho run), 9:23. Utes 15–3. Drive: 3 plays, 24 yards, 1:28.
- UTAH – Wayshawn Parker 9-yard run (Dillon Curtis kick), 1:55. Utes 22–3. Drive: 6 plays, 67 yards, 3:05.
- UTAH – Wayshawn Parker 7-yard pass from Devon Dampier (Dillon Curtis kick), 0:27. Utes 29–3. Drive: 6 plays, 64 yards, 1:05.

Third quarter

- UTAH – Noah Bennee 1-yard pass from Devon Dampier (Dillon Curtis kick), 12:03. Utes 36–3. Drive: 5 plays, 75 yards, 2:57.

Fourth quarter

- UTAH – Devon Dampier 2-yard run (Dillon Curtis kick), 12:47. Utes 43–3. Drive: 11 plays, 70 yards, 4:45.
- ARK – Ismael Cisse 21-yard pass from AJ Hill (Max Gilbert kick), 6:43. Utes 43–10. Drive: 14 plays, 75 yards, 6:04.

Statistics	ARK	UTAH
First downs	21	24
Plays–yards	76–305	62–442
Rushes–yards	28–61	34–141
Passing yards	244	301
Passing: comp–att–int	22–48–1	20–28–1
Turnovers	1	1
Time of possession	31:57	28:03

Team	Category	Player	Statistics
Arkansas	Passing	KJ Jackson	14/34, 139 yards, INT
Arkansas	Rushing	KJ Jackson	7 carries, 34 yards
Arkansas	Receiving	Chris Marshall	5 receptions, 63 yards
Utah	Passing	Devon Dampier	18/24, 261 yards, 2 TD, INT
Utah	Rushing	Wayshawn Parker	10 carries, 53 yards, 2 TD
Utah	Receiving	Noah Bennee	4 receptions, 113 yards, TD

=== vs No. 2 Georgia ===
This was the 17th matchup between Arkansas and Georgia, with UGA leading 12–4 going into the game.

No. 2 Georgia Bulldogs (2–0) at Arkansas Razorbacks (1–1) – Game summary

Quarter	1	2	3	4	Total
No. 2 Bulldogs	7	14	10	14	45
Razorbacks	0	3	0	14	17

at Donald W. Reynolds Razorback Stadium • Fayetteville, Arkansas

- Date: September 19
- Game time: 11:00 a.m. CDT
- Game weather: Sunny • Temperature: 88 °F (31 °C) • Wind: NE 8 mph (13 km/h)
- Game attendance: 66,123
- Referee: Steve Marlowe
- TV announcers (ABC): Dave Pasch, Dusty Dvoracek and Taylor McGregor
- Report: Official report

Game information

First quarter

- (6:53) UGA – Nate Frazier 5-yard run, Peyton Woodring kick (Drive: 6 plays, 62 yards, 3:43; Georgia 7–0)

Second quarter

- (8:45) UGA – Chauncey Bowens 2-yard run, Peyton Woodring kick (Drive: 10 plays, 75 yards, 6:08; Georgia 14–0)
- (0:36) UGA – Chauncey Bowens 5-yard run, Peyton Woodring kick (Drive: 8 plays, 93 yards, 3:52; Georgia 21–0)
- (0:02) ARK – Max Gilbert 41-yard field goal (Drive: 6 plays, 61 yards, 0:34; Georgia 21–3)

Third quarter

- (9:02) UGA – Peyton Woodring 38-yard field goal (Drive: 10 plays, 55 yards, 5:58; Georgia 24–3)
- (3:35) UGA – Chauncey Bowens 1-yard run, Peyton Woodring kick (Drive: 8 plays, 32 yards, 4:23; Georgia 31–3)

Fourth quarter

- (12:42) UGA – Craig Dandridge 61-yard pass from Gunner Stockton, Peyton Woodring kick (Drive: 1 play, 61 yards, 0:10; Georgia 38–3)
- (8:30) ARK – Sutton Smith 5-yard run, Max Gilbert kick (Drive: 12 plays, 75 yards, 4:12; Georgia 38–10)
- (2:31) UGA – Lawson Luckie 2-yard pass from Ryan Puglisi, Peyton Woodring kick (Drive: 11 plays, 75 yards, 5:59; Georgia 45–10)
- (0:40) ARK – Ty Lockwood 2-yard pass from KJ Jackson, Max Gilbert kick (Drive: 9 plays, 75 yards, 1:51; Georgia 45–17)

Statistics	UGA	ARK
First downs	23	18
Plays–yards	63–464	62–300
Rushes–yards	42–254	20–17
Passing yards	210	283
Passing: comp–att–int	17–21–0	29–42–0
Turnovers	0	1
Time of possession	35:40	24:20

Team	Category	Player	Statistics
Georgia	Passing	Gunner Stockton	10/13, 147 yards, TD
Georgia	Rushing	Gunner Stockton	7 carries, 97 yards
Georgia	Receiving	Craig Dandridge	3 receptions, 74 yards, TD
Arkansas	Passing	KJ Jackson	20/27, 212 yards, TD
Arkansas	Rushing	Sutton Smith	6 carries, 17 yards, TD
Arkansas	Receiving	Chris Marshall	7 receptions, 104 yards

=== vs Tulsa ===
Tulsa Golden Hurricane (3–0) at Arkansas Razorbacks (1–2) – Game summary

Quarter	1	2	3	4	Total
Golden Hurricane	0	0	6	0	6
Razorbacks	10	6	7	11	34

at Donald W. Reynolds Razorback Stadium • Fayetteville, Arkansas

- Date: September 26
- Game time: 7:00 p.m. CDT
- Game weather: Cloudy • Temperature: 78 °F (26 °C) • Wind: W 6 mph (9.7 km/h)
- Game attendance: 72,890
- Referee: Ted Pitts
- TV announcers (SECN+): Richard Cross and Charlie Strong

Statistics	TLSA	ARK
First downs	12	24
Plays–yards	55–241	79–441
Rushes–yards	23–65	43–132
Passing yards	176	309
Passing: comp–att–int	20–32–0	24–36–1
Turnovers	2	1
Time of possession	22:29	37:31

Team	Category	Player	Statistics
Tulsa	Passing	Dexter Williams II	20/32, 176 yards
Tulsa	Rushing	Damari Alston	9 carries, 27 yards, TD
Tulsa	Receiving	Donnell Gee Jr.	4 receptions, 49 yards
Arkansas	Passing	KJ Jackson	24/36, 309 yards, TD, INT
Arkansas	Rushing	Cam Settles	11 carries, 40 yards
Arkansas	Receiving	Chris Marshall	9 receptions, 195 yards, TD

=== at Texas A&M (rivalry) ===
Arkansas Razorbacks (2–2) at Texas A&M Aggies (2–2) – Game summary

Quarter	1	2	3	4	Total
Razorbacks	7	0	0	0	7
Aggies	14	10	7	3	34

at Kyle Field • College Station, Texas

- Date: October 3
- Game time: 6:00 p.m. CDT
- Game weather: Rain • Temperature: 78 °F (26 °C) • Wind: N 11 mph
- Game attendance: 108,657
- Referee: Tim Barker
- TV announcers (ESPN2): Lowell Galindo, Kirk Morrison, and Dawn Davenport

Game information
First quarter
- TAMU – Carsyn Baker 2-yard run (David Olano kick), 9:27. Aggies 7–0. Drive: 8 plays, 28 yards, 4:12.
- TAMU – KJ Edwards 20-yard run (David Olano kick), 3:00. Aggies 14–0. Drive: 10 plays, 78 yards, 5:40.
- ARK – Chris Marshall 26-yard pass from KJ Jackson (Max Gilbert kick), 0:24. Aggies 14–7. Drive: 6 plays, 75 yards, 2:36.

Second quarter

- TAMU – Marcel Reed 1-yard run (David Olano kick), 2:22. Aggies 21–7. Drive: 13 plays, 63 yards, 8:12.
- TAMU – David Olano 57-yard field goal, 0:02. Aggies 24–7. Drive: 7 plays, 33 yards, 1:58.

Third quarter

- TAMU – KJ Edwards 3-yard run (David Olano kick), 12:42. Aggies 31–7. Drive: 4 plays, 75 yards, 2:18.

Fourth quarter

- TAMU – David Olano 50-yard field goal, 14:50. Aggies 34–7. Drive: 9 plays, 65 yards, 5:38.

Statistics	ARK	TAMU
First downs	14	23
Plays–yards	47–214	68–401
Rushes–yards	22–103	49–231
Passing yards	111	170
Passing: comp–att–int	13–25–1	13–19–0
Turnovers	1	0
Time of possession	21:52	38:08

Team	Category	Player	Statistics
Arkansas	Passing	KJ Jackson	13/25, 111 yards, TD, INT
Arkansas	Rushing	Sutton Smith	6 carries, 41 yards
Arkansas	Receiving	Chris Marshall	7 receptions, 76 yards, TD
Texas A&M	Passing	Marcel Reed	13/19, 170 yards
Texas A&M	Rushing	KJ Edwards	11 carries, 66 yards, 2 TD
Texas A&M	Receiving	Kiotti Armstrong	1 reception, 54 yards

=== vs No. 15 Tennessee ===
Tennessee and Arkansas football teams prepare to begin the game in Razorback Stadium

No. 15 Tennessee Volunteers (4–1) at Arkansas Razorbacks (2–3) – Game summary

Quarter	1	2	3	4	Total
No. 15 Volunteers	0	7	3	14	24
Razorbacks	0	0	14	3	17

at Donald W. Reynolds Razorback Stadium • Fayetteville, Arkansas

- Date: October 10
- Game time: 3:15 p.m. CDT
- Game weather: Sunny • Temperature: 85 °F (29 °C) • Wind: NE 6 miles per hour (9.7 km/h)
- Game attendance: 69,038
- Referee: Jeff Heaser
- TV announcers (SECN): Matt Schumacker, Aaron Murray, and Taylor Davis

Statistics	TENN	ARK
First downs	20	15
Plays–yards	64–414	61–288
Rushes–yards	35–167	34–133
Passing yards	247	155
Passing: comp–att–int	18–29–2	15–27–0
Turnovers	3	1
Time of possession	27:56	32:04

Team	Category	Player	Statistics
Tennessee	Passing	George MacIntyre	18/29, 247 yards, TD, 2 INT
Tennessee	Rushing	Desean Bishop	19 carries, 138 yards, TD
Tennessee	Receiving	DaSaahn Brame	3 receptions, 87 yards
Arkansas	Passing	KJ Jackson	15/27, 155 yards, TD
Arkansas	Rushing	Cam Settles	8 carries, 50 yards
Arkansas	Receiving	Chris Marshall	7 receptions, 56 yards

=== at Vanderbilt ===
Arkansas Razorbacks (2–4) at Vanderbilt Commodores (3–3) – Game summary

Quarter	1	2	3	4	Total
Razorbacks	0	14	14	3	31
Commodores	7	7	7	0	21

at FirstBank Stadium • Nashville, Tennessee

- Date: October 17
- Game time: 6:00 p.m. CDT
- Game weather: Sunny • Temperature: 60 °F (16 °C) • Wind: N 10 miles per hour (16 km/h)
- Game attendance: 35,000
- Referee: Adam Savoie
- TV announcers (ESPN2): Taylor Zarzour (play-by-play), Matt Stinchcomb (analyst), and Michella Chester (sideline reporter)

Statistics	ARK	VAN
First downs	24	20
Plays–yards	72–438	60–390
Rushes–yards	41–187	29–116
Passing yards	251	274
Passing: comp–att–int	21–31–0	19–31–2
Turnovers	0	2
Time of possession	33:47	26:13

Team	Category	Player	Statistics
Arkansas	Passing	KJ Jackson	21/31, 251 yards
Arkansas	Rushing	KJ Jackson	11 carries, 58 yards, TD
Arkansas	Receiving	Antonio Jordan	5 receptions, 74 yards
Vanderbilt	Passing	Jared Curtis	19/31, 274 yards, TD, 2 INT
Vanderbilt	Rushing	Sedrick Alexander	10 carries, 57 yards, TD
Vanderbilt	Receiving	Junior Sherrill	8 receptions, 99 yards, TD

=== vs No. 23 Missouri (Battle Line Rivalry) ===
No. 23 Missouri Tigers (5–2) at Arkansas Razorbacks (3–4) – Game summary

Quarter	1	2	3	4	Total
No. 23 Tigers	10	3	14	7	34
Razorbacks	0	7	0	3	10

at Donald W. Reynolds Razorback Stadium • Fayetteville, Arkansas

- Date: October 31
- Game time: 6:45 p.m. CDT
- TV announcers (SECN): Dave Neal, Cole Cubelic, and Tori Petry

Statistics	MIZ	ARK
First downs		
Plays–yards		
Rushes–yards		
Passing yards		
Passing: comp–att–int		
Time of possession		

Team	Category	Player	Statistics
Missouri	Passing		
Missouri	Rushing		
Missouri	Receiving		
Arkansas	Passing		
Arkansas	Rushing		
Arkansas	Receiving		

=== at Auburn ===
Arkansas Razorbacks (3–5) at Auburn Tigers (4–4) – Game summary

Quarter	1	2	3	4	Total
Razorbacks	3	7	3	10	23
Tigers	0	3	6	17	26

at Jordan–Hare Stadium • Auburn, Alabama

- Date: November 7
- Game time: 11:45 a.m. CDT
- Game weather: Sunny • Temperature: 63 °F (17 °C) • Wind: NW 8 miles per hour (13 km/h)
- Game attendance: 88,043
- Referee: Ted Pitts
- TV announcers (SECN): Taylor Zarzour, Matt Stinchcomb and Michella Chester

Game information

First quarter

- ARK – Max Gilbert 38-yard field goal, 2:28. Arkansas 3–0. Drive: 12 plays, 57 yards, 6:09.

Second quarter

- ARK – Braylen Russell 2-yard rush (Max Gilbert kick), 11:21. Arkansas 10–0. Drive: 4 plays, 66 yards, 1:13.
- AUB – Alex McPherson 33-yard field goal, 0:03. Arkansas 10–3. Drive: 9 plays, 57 yards, 1:44.

Third quarter

- AUB – Chas Nimrod 15-yard pass from Byrum Brown (Alex McPherson kick failed), 5:01. Arkansas 10–9. Drive: 12 plays, 67 yards, 5:01.
- ARK – Max Gilbert 37-yard field goal, 1:36. Arkansas 13–9. Drive: 6 plays, 56 yards, 3:25.

Fourth quarter

- AUB – Byrum Brown 5-yard rush (Alex McPherson kick), 12:50. Auburn 16–13. Drive: 12 plays, 75 yards, 3:46.
- ARK – Max Gilbert 46-yard field goal, 9:32. Tied 16–16. Drive: 8 plays, 44 yards, 3:12.
- AUB – Keshaun Singleton 28-yard pass from Byrum Brown (Alex McPherson kick), 3:56. Auburn 23–16. Drive: 4 plays, 65 yards, 1:53.
- ARK – Antonio Jordan 23-yard pass from KJ Jackson (Max Gilbert kick), 1:54. Tied 23–23. Drive: 5 plays, 75 yards, 2:02.
- AUB – Alex McPherson 43-yard field goal, 0:33. Auburn 26–23. Drive: 10 plays, 50 yards, 1:21.

Statistics	ARK	AUB
First downs	20	21
Plays–yards	74–352	74–363
Rushes–yards	44–172	40–183
Passing yards	180	180
Passing: comp–att–int	14–30–1	23–34–0
Turnovers	2	0
Time of possession	33:16	26:44

Team	Category	Player	Statistics
Arkansas	Passing	KJ Jackson	14/30, 180 yards, TD, INT
Arkansas	Rushing	Cam Settles	16 rushes, 100 yards
Arkansas	Receiving	Chris Marshall	5 receptions, 65 yards
Auburn	Passing	Byrum Brown	23/34, 180 yards, 2 TD
Auburn	Rushing	Byrum Brown	23 rushes, 120 yards, TD
Auburn	Receiving	Keshaun Singleton	6 receptions, 58 yards, TD

=== vs No. 17 South Carolina ===
No. 17 South Carolina Gamecocks (6–3) at Arkansas Razorbacks (3–6) – Game summary

Quarter	1	2	3	4	Total
No. 17 Gamecocks	0	0	6	0	6
Razorbacks	0	17	7	10	34

at Donald W. Reynolds Razorback Stadium • Fayetteville, Arkansas

- Date: November 14
- Game time: 6:45 p.m. CDT
- TV announcers (SECN): Dave Neal (play-by-play), Cole Cubelic (analyst), and Tori Petry (sideline reporter)

Statistics	SC	ARK
First downs		
Plays–yards		
Rushes–yards		
Passing yards		
Passing: comp–att–int		
Time of possession		

Team	Category	Player	Statistics
South Carolina	Passing		
South Carolina	Rushing		
South Carolina	Receiving		
Arkansas	Passing		
Arkansas	Rushing		
Arkansas	Receiving		

=== at No. 5 Texas (rivalry) ===
Junior left-handed quarterback KJ Jackson throws a pass for the Arkansas Razorbacks against the Texas Longhorns

Arkansas Razorbacks (4–6) at No. 5 Texas Longhorns (8–2) – Game summary

Quarter	1	2	Total
Razorbacks			0
No. 5 Longhorns			0

at Darrell K Royal–Texas Memorial Stadium • Austin, Texas

- Date: November 21
- TV announcers (ESPN): Dave Pasch, Dusty Dvoracek, and Taylor McGregor

Statistics	ARK	TEX
First downs		
Plays–yards		
Rushes–yards		
Passing yards		
Passing: comp–att–int		
Time of possession		

Team	Category	Player	Statistics
Arkansas	Passing		
Arkansas	Rushing		
Arkansas	Receiving		
Texas	Passing		
Texas	Rushing		
Texas	Receiving		

=== vs LSU (Battle for the Boot) ===
LSU Tigers (0–0) at Arkansas Razorbacks (0–0) – Game summary

Quarter	1	2	Total
Tigers			0
Razorbacks			0

at Donald W. Reynolds Razorback Stadium • Fayetteville, Arkansas

- Date: November 28

Statistics	LSU	ARK
First downs		
Plays–yards		
Rushes–yards		
Passing yards		
Passing: comp–att–int		
Time of possession		

Team	Category	Player	Statistics
LSU	Passing		
LSU	Rushing		
LSU	Receiving		
Arkansas	Passing		
Arkansas	Rushing		
Arkansas	Receiving		

== Personnel ==
=== Coaching staff ===
Arkansas Razorbacks coaches
Coach	Position	Year	Alma mater
Ryan Silverfield	Head coach	1st	Hampden–Sydney College (2003)
Tim Cramsey	Offensive coordinator	1st	New Hampshire (1998)
Ron Roberts	Defensive coordinator	1st	UT Martin (1990)
Chad Lunsford	Special teams coordinator	1st	Georgia College (2000)
Deron Wilson	co-Defensive coordinator/secondary coach	3rd	Southern Miss (2013)
Mitch Stewart	Quarterbacks coach	1st	Valdosta State (2005)
Morgan Turner	Tight ends coach	4th	Illinois (2009)
Marcus Johnson	Offensive line coach	1st	Ole Miss (2004)
Jeff Myers	Run Game Coordinator/Offensive Line	1st	Toledo (2014)
Larry Smith	Wide receivers coach	1st	Vanderbilt (2011)
David Johnson	Running backs coach	1st	Nicholls State (1995)
Marion Hobby	Defensive line coach	1st	Tennessee (1990)
Kynjee’ Cotton	Defensive Run Game Coordinator/DL	1st	Alabama State (2012)
Eddie Hicks	Cornerbacks coach	1st	Southern Miss (2009)
Noah Franklin	Strength and conditioning coach	1st	Oklahoma State (2010)
