= KJ Jackson =

American football player (born 2006)

- Jackson in 2026

No. 7 – Arkansas Razorbacks
- Position: Quarterback
- Class: Junior

Personal information
- Born: January 18, 2006 (age 20)
- Listed height: 6 ft 4 in (1.93 m)
- Listed weight: 225 lb (102 kg)

Career information
- High school: Saint James (Montgomery, Alabama)
- College: Arkansas (2024–present)
- Stats at ESPN

KJ Jackson (born January 18, 2006) is an American college football quarterback for the Arkansas Razorbacks.

== Early life ==
Jackson attended Saint James School in Montgomery, Alabama. He passed for 2,813 yards with 42 touchdowns his junior year and 2,951 yards and 43 touchdowns his senior year. For his career he passed for 130 touchdowns, which was third all-time in Alabama High School Athletic Association history. Jackson committed to the University of Arkansas to play college football.

== College career ==
Jackson played in one game his true freshman year at Arkansas in 2024, completing four of four passes for 59 yards, and took a redshirt. He entered his redshirt freshman year in 2025 as the backup to Taylen Green. He earned his first extensive playing time against the Texas Longhorns, completing 16 of 29 passes for 206 yards with a passing and rushing touchdown.

=== Statistics ===
Season	Team	Games			Passing								Rushing			
Season	Team	GP	GS	Record	Comp	Att	Pct	Yards	Avg	TD	Int	Rate	Att	Yards	Avg	TD
2024	Arkansas	1	0	—	4	4	100.0	59	14.8	0	0	223.9	1	3	3.0	0
2025	Arkansas	5	1	0–1	33	54	61.1	441	8.2	3	0	148.0	11	52	4.7	2
2026	Arkansas	5	5	2–3	95	157	60.5	1,038	6.6	6	4	123.6	39	85	2.2	2
Career		11	6	2–4	132	215	61.4	1,538	7.2	9	4	131.6	51	140	2.7	4
