= 2026 Conference USA football season =

- League: NCAA Division I Football Bowl Subdivision
- Sport: Football
- Duration: August 29 – December 4, 2026
- Teams: 10

2027 NFL draft

Regular season

CUSA Championship Game
- Date: December 4, 2026

Seasons
- ← 2025 2027 →

2026 Conference USA football standings
	Conf.			Overall
Team	W		L	W		L
Liberty y	7	–	0	10	–	1
Jacksonville State y	6	–	1	8	–	3
Delaware	4	–	3	6	–	5
Middle Tennessee	4	–	3	6	–	5
Kennesaw State	4	–	3	5	–	6
Missouri State	3	–	4	4	–	7
Western Kentucky	3	–	4	4	–	7
FIU	2	–	5	4	–	7
New Mexico State	2	–	5	3	–	8
Sam Houston	0	–	7	1	–	10
Championship: Jacksonville State at Liberty
y – Championship game participant; As of November 22, 2026; Rankings from AP poll

The 2026 Conference USA football season is the 31st season of college football play for Conference USA (CUSA). The season began on August 29, 2026, and will conclude with the Conference Championship Game on December 4, 2026. Ten member schools are taking part in the season, which is part of the 2026 NCAA Division I FBS football season.

== Conference realignment ==
Prior to the 2026 season, two schools departed from Conference USA - the University of Texas at El Paso and Louisiana Tech University. Louisiana Tech's departure was initially not accepted by CUSA, and the school entered in to a lawsuit against the conference. The two parties later reached a settlement out of court, with Louisiana Tech leaving CUSA to join the Sun Belt Conference, while CUSA received an undisclosed amount in exit fees from the school. The departures left Conference USA with 10 competing schools for the 2026 season.

== Preseason ==
For the second year in a row, Conference USA conducted a preseason "Bowl Confidence Index" poll instead of a traditional media poll. The results of the poll were released on July 17, 2026.

2026 CUSA Bowl Confidence Index
Team	Pct. of Vote
Jacksonville State	100%
Liberty	100%
Western Kentucky	100%
Kennesaw State	85%
Delaware	75%
FIU	60%
Missouri State	35%
New Mexico State	20%
Middle Tennessee	15%
Sam Houston	10%

=== Preseason awards ===
Preseason awards were announced on July 17, 2026.

- Preseason offensive player of the year: Nick Minicucci, Senior, Delaware, Quarterback
- Preseason defensive player of the year: Baron Hopson, Grad, Kennesaw State, Linebacker
- Preseason special teams players of the year: Garrison Rippa, Redshirt junior, Jacksonville State, Kicker

== Head coaches ==
- On December 11, 2025, Missouri State head coach Ryan Beard was announced as the new head coach of Coastal Carolina in the Sun Belt Conference. On December 19, 2025, the school announced Casey Woods as the new head coach for 2026.

Note: All stats shown are before the start of the 2026 season.

Team	Head coach	Years at school	Overall record	Record at school	CUSA record
Delaware	Ryan Carty	5	33–17	33–17	4–4
FIU	Willie Simmons	2	73–30	7–6	5–3
Jacksonville State	Charles Kelly	2	9–6	9–6	7–1
Kennesaw State	Jerry Mack	2	41–19	10–4	7–1
Liberty	Jamey Chadwell	4	123–70	25–13	16–8
Middle Tennessee	Derek Mason	3	33–73	6–18	4–12
Missouri State	Casey Woods	1	0–0	0–0	0–0
New Mexico State	Tony Sanchez	3	27–57	7–17	4–12
Sam Houston	Phil Longo	2	9–24	2–10	1–7
Western Kentucky	Tyson Helton	8	57–36	57–36	40–15

== Rankings ==
		Pre	Wk 1	Wk 2	Wk 3	Wk 4	Wk 5	Wk 6	Wk 7	Wk 8	Wk 9	Wk 10	Wk 11	Wk 12	Wk 13	Wk 14	Wk 15	Final
Delaware	AP																	
Delaware	C																	
Delaware	CFP	Not released																
FIU	AP																	
FIU	C																	
FIU	CFP	Not released																
Jacksonville State	AP																	
Jacksonville State	C	RV																
Jacksonville State	CFP	Not released																
Kennesaw State	AP																	
Kennesaw State	C																	
Kennesaw State	CFP	Not released																
Liberty	AP	RV									RV							
Liberty	C										RV							
Liberty	CFP	Not released																
Middle Tennessee	AP																	
Middle Tennessee	C																	
Middle Tennessee	CFP	Not released																
Missouri State	AP																	
Missouri State	C																	
Missouri State	CFP	Not released																
New Mexico State	AP																	
New Mexico State	C																	
New Mexico State	CFP	Not released																
Sam Houston	AP																	
Sam Houston	C																	
Sam Houston	CFP	Not released																
Western Kentucky	AP																	
Western Kentucky	C																	
Western Kentucky	CFP	Not released																

Legend
	Improvement in ranking
	Drop in ranking
	Not ranked previous week
	No change in ranking from previous week
RV	Received votes but were not ranked in Top 25 of poll
т	Tied with team above or below also with this symbol

AP -

Coaches -

CFP -

== Schedule ==
The final 2026 schedule was released on April 29, 2026.

Index to colors and formatting
CUSA member won
CUSA member lost
CUSA teams in **bold**

=== Week 0 ===
Date	Time	Visiting team	Home team	Site	TV	Result	Attendance	Ref.
August 29	5:30 p.m.	**Jacksonville State**	North Dakota State	Fargodome • Fargo, ND	CBSSN	**L** 7–33	18,573	
August 29	7:00 p.m.	**New Mexico State**	Florida State	Doak Campbell Stadium • Tallahassee, FL	The CW	**L** 17–34	65,915	
^{#}Rankings from AP Poll released prior to game. All times are in Eastern Time.

=== Week 1 ===
Date	Time	Visiting team	Home team	Site	TV	Result	Attendance	Ref.
September 3	7:00 p.m.	Merrimack	**Delaware**	Delaware Stadium • Newark, DE	ESPN+	**W** 42–7	17,268	
September 3	7:00 p.m.	West Georgia	**Kennesaw State**	Fifth Third Stadium • Kennesaw, GA	ESPN+	**W** 47–0	11,040	
September 5	12:00 p.m.	**Liberty**	James Madison	Bridgeforth Stadium • Harrisonburg, VA (Battle of the Blue Ridge)	ESPNU	**L** 13–20	25,035	
September 5	7:00 p.m.	**Missouri State**	No. 8 Texas A&M	Kyle Field • College Station, TX	ESPN	**L** 0–50	107,782	
September 5	7:00 p.m.	**FIU**	South Florida	Raymond James Stadium • Tampa, FL	ESPN+	**L** 9–19	41,847	
September 5	7:00 p.m.	Murray State	**Middle Tennessee**	Johnny "Red" Floyd Stadium • Murfreesboro, TN	ESPN+	**W** 38–14		
September 5	7:00 p.m.	Eastern Kentucky	**Jacksonville State**	AmFirst Stadium • Jacksonville, AL	ESPN+	**W** 49–7	19,677	
September 5	7:00 p.m.	**Sam Houston**	Troy	Veterans Memorial Stadium • Troy, AL	ESPN+	**L** 21–24	24,356	
September 5	9:00 p.m.	Mercyhurst	**New Mexico State**	Aggie Memorial Stadium • Las Cruces, NM	ESPN+	**W** 51–14	9,189	
September 5	10:30 p.m.	**Western Kentucky**	Nevada	Mackay Stadium • Reno, NV	CBSSN	**L** 14–49	19,404	
^{#}Rankings from AP Poll released prior to game. All times are in Eastern Time.

=== Week 2 ===
Date	Time	Visiting team	Home team	Site	TV	Result	Attendance	Ref.
September 12	12:00 p.m.	Gardner-Webb	**Liberty**	Williams Stadium • Lynchburg, VA	ESPN+	**W** 24–23	15,708	
September 12	12:45 p.m.	**Western Kentucky**	No. 3 Georgia	Sanford Stadium • Athens, GA	SECN	**L** 20–70	93,033	
September 12	4:15 p.m.	**Delaware**	Vanderbilt	FirstBank Stadium • Nashville, TN	SECN	**L** 26–35	35,000	
September 12	6:00 p.m.	**Jacksonville State**	Ohio	Peden Stadium • Athens, OH	ESPN+	**L** 27–29 ^{4OT}	21,037	
September 12	6:00 p.m.	Buffalo	**FIU**	Pitbull Stadium • Miami, FL	ESPN+	**W** 33–20	18,202	
September 12	7:00 p.m.	Tulsa	**Sam Houston**	Bowers Stadium • Huntsville, TX	ESPN+	**L** 17–23		
September 12	7:00 p.m.	Georgia State	**Kennesaw State**	Fifth Third Stadium • Kennesaw, GA	ESPN+	**L** 17–31	11,040	
September 12	7:00 p.m.	**Middle Tennessee**	Marshall	Joan C. Edwards Stadium • Huntington, WV	ESPN+	**L** 26–28	25,662	
September 12	7:00 p.m.	Lindenwood	**Missouri State**	Robert W. Plaster Stadium • Springfield, MO	ESPN+	**W** 48–14	12,138	
September 12	11:59 p.m.	**New Mexico State**	Hawaii	Clarence T. C. Ching Athletics Complex • Honolulu, HI	KFVE/MW+	**L** 19–29	12,905	
^{#}Rankings from AP Poll released prior to game. All times are in Eastern Time.

=== Week 3 ===
Date	Time	Visiting team	Home team	Site	TV	Result	Attendance	Ref.
September 19	11:30 a.m.	Coastal Carolina	**Delaware**	Delaware Stadium • Newark, DE	CBSSN	**W** 22–14	17,937	
September 19	4:00 p.m.	**Western Kentucky**	No. 4 Indiana	Memorial Stadium • Bloomington, IN	Peacock/NBCSN	**L** 0–38	54,695	
September 19	4:00 p.m.	Ball State	**Liberty**	Williams Stadium • Lynchburg, VA	ESPN+	**W** 51–15	18,330	
September 19	6:00 p.m.	**FIU**	Florida Atlantic	Flagler Credit Union Stadium • Boca Raton, FL (Shula Bowl)	ESPN+	**L** 10–16	20,714	
September 19	6:30 p.m.	Marshall	**Missouri State**	Robert W. Plaster Stadium • Springfield, MO	CBSSN	**L** 24–30	16,010	
September 19	7:00 p.m.	Georgia Southern	**Jacksonville State**	AmFirst Stadium • Jacksonville, AL	ESPN+	**W** 31–27	16,142	
September 19	7:00 p.m.	Nevada	**Middle Tennessee**	Johnny "Red" Floyd Stadium • Murfreesboro, TN	ESPN+	**W** 27–20	16,106	
September 19	7:00 p.m.	Nicholls	**Sam Houston**	Bowers Stadium • Huntsville, TX	ESPN+	**W** 59–0	12,182	
September 19	7:45 p.m.	**Kennesaw State**	No. 15 Tennessee	Neyland Stadium • Knoxville, TN	SECN	**L** 9–42	101,915	
^{#}Rankings from AP Poll released prior to game. All times are in Eastern Time.

=== Week 4 ===
Date	Time	Visiting team	Home team	Site	TV	Result	Attendance	Ref.
September 24	7:30 p.m.	**Liberty**	Coastal Carolina	Brooks Stadium • Conway, SC (rivalry)	ESPN	**W** 34–17	22,116	
September 26	12:00 p.m.	**Sam Houston**	No. 11 Texas Tech	Galaxy Stadium • Lubbock, TX	TNT	**L** 14–49	59,704	
September 26	3:30 p.m.	Nex Mexico	**New Mexico State**	Aggie Memorial Stadium • Las Cruces, NM (Rio Grande Rivalry)	CBSSN	**L** 18–42	25,024	
September 26	6:00 p.m.	**Delaware**	Virginia	Scott Stadium • Charlottesville, VA	ACCN	**L** 3–42	41,935	
September 26	6:00 p.m.	LIU	**FIU**	Pitbull Stadium • Miami, FL	ESPN+	**W** 20–3	17,003	
September 26	7:00 p.m.	**Kennesaw State**	Arkansas State	Centennial Bank Stadium • Jonesboro, AR	ESPN+	**L** 14–17	19,087	
September 26	7:00 p.m.	Mercyhurst	**Western Kentucky**	Houchens Industries–L. T. Smith Stadium • Bowling Green, KY	ESPN+	**W** 52–7	17,247	
September 26	7:00 p.m.	**Middle Tennessee**	**Jacksonville State**	AmFirst Stadium • Jacksonville, AL	ESPN+	**JVST** 23–13	16,977	
September 26	9:00 p.m.	**Missouri State**	No. 22 SMU	Gerald J. Ford Stadium • University Park, TX	ACCN	**L** 24–34	31,987	
^{#}Rankings from AP Poll released prior to game. All times are in Eastern Time.

=== Week 5 ===
Date	Time	Visiting team	Home team	Site	TV	Result	Attendance	Ref.
October 1	8:00 p.m.	**Western Kentucky**	**New Mexico State**	Aggie Memorial Stadium • Las Cruces, NM	CBSSN	**NMSU** 34–13	5,513	
October 2	7:00 p.m.	**Liberty**	**Delaware**	Delaware Stadium • Newark, DE	CBSSN	**LIB** 30–14	19,182	
October 3	12:00 p.m.	**Middle Tennessee**	Kansas	David Booth Kansas Memorial Stadium • Lawrence, KS	ESPNU	**L** 0–55	32,000	
^{#}Rankings from AP Poll released prior to game. All times are in Eastern Time.

=== Week 6 ===
Date	Time	Visiting team	Home team	Site	TV	Result	Attendance	Ref.
October 7	7:00 p.m.	**Jacksonville State**	**Kennesaw State**	Fifth Third Stadium • Kennesaw, GA	CBSSN	**JVST** 27–26	10,225	
October 7	7:30 p.m.	**New Mexico State**	**FIU**	Pitbull Stadium • Miami, FL	ESPN2	**FIU** 22–3	10,013	
October 8	7:00 p.m.	**Sam Houston**	**Liberty**	Williams Stadium • Lynchburg, VA	ESPNU	**LIB** 35–3	15,335	
October 8	7:00 p.m.	**Missouri State**	**Western Kentucky**	Houchens Industries–L. T. Smith Stadium • Bowling Green, KY	CBSSN	**WKU** 34–13	11,102	
^{#}Rankings from AP Poll released prior to game. All times are in Eastern Time.

=== Week 7 ===
Date	Time	Visiting team	Home team	Site	TV	Result	Attendance	Ref.
October 13	7:00 p.m.	**Delaware**	**Middle Tennessee**	Johnny "Red" Floyd Stadium • Murfreesboro, TN	CBSSN	**MTSU** 33–30	8,606	
October 13	8:00 p.m.	**FIU**	**Jacksonville State**	AmFirst Stadium • Jacksonville, AL	ESPNU	**JVST** 33–30	17,224	
October 14	7:30 p.m.	**Kennesaw State**	**Missouri State**	Robert W. Plaster Stadium • Springfield, MO	CBSSN	**MSU** 16–13	9,044	
October 14	8:00 p.m.	**Western Kentucky**	**Sam Houston**	Bowers Stadium • Huntsville, TX	ESPN	**WKU** 16–3	7,291	
^{#}Rankings from AP Poll released prior to game. All times are in Eastern Time.

=== Week 8 ===
Date	Time	Visiting team	Home team	Site	TV	Result	Attendance	Ref.
October 20	7:00 p.m.	**Middle Tennessee**	**FIU**	Pitbull Stadium • Miami, FL	CBSSN	**MTSU** 26–23	8,230	
October 20	7:00 p.m.	**Missouri State**	**Delaware**	Delaware Stadium • Newark, DE	ESPNU	**DEL** 61–38	14,214	
October 21	8:00 p.m.	**New Mexico State**	**Sam Houston**	Bowers Stadium • Huntsville, TX	ESPN2	**NMSU** 30–24	8,577	
October 22	7:00 p.m.	**Liberty**	**Kennesaw State**	Fifth Third Stadium • Kennesaw, GA	CBSSN	**LIB** 34–6	8,159	
^{#}Rankings from AP Poll released prior to game. All times are in Eastern Time.

=== Week 9 ===
Date	Time	Visiting team	Home team	Site	TV	Result	Attendance	Ref.
October 27	7:00 p.m.	**Delaware**	**Western Kentucky**	Houchens Industries–L. T. Smith Stadium • Bowling Green, KY	CBSSN	**DEL** 35–21	12,147	
October 27	8:00 p.m.	**Sam Houston**	**Missouri State**	Robert W. Plaster Stadium • Springfield, MO	ESPN2	**MSU** 24–3	11,119	
October 28	7:00 p.m.	**Kennesaw State**	**Middle Tennessee**	Johnny "Red" Floyd Stadium • Murfreesboro, TN	CBSSN	**KENN** 44–28	10,005	
October 28	8:00 p.m.	**Jacksonville State**	**New Mexico State**	Aggie Memorial Stadium • Las Cruces, NM	ESPN2	**JVST** 24–0	6,511	
October 31	3:30 p.m.	**FIU**	**Liberty**	Williams Stadium • Lynchburg, VA	CBSSN	**LIB** 49–10	16,702	
^{#}Rankings from AP Poll released prior to game. All times are in Eastern Time.

=== Week 10 ===
Date	Time	Visiting team	Home team	Site	TV	Result	Attendance	Ref.
November 7	3:00 p.m.	**Delaware**	**Kennesaw State**	Fifth Third Stadium • Kennesaw, GA	ESPN+	**KENN** 42–40	10,300	
November 7	3:30 p.m.	**Western Kentucky**	**Middle Tennessee**	Johnny "Red" Floyd Stadium • Murfreesboro, TN (100 Miles of Hate)	ESPN+	**MTSU** 51–42	12,127	
November 7	4:00 p.m.	**Missouri State**	**FIU**	Pitbull Stadium • Miami, FL	ESPN+	**FIU** 23–20	10,575	
November 7	7:00 p.m.	**Sam Houston**	**Jacksonville State**	AmFirst Stadium • Jacksonville, AL	CBSSN	**JVST** 47–14	20,476	
November 7	8:00 p.m.	**Liberty**	**New Mexico State**	Aggie Memorial Stadium • Las Cruces, NM	ESPNU	**LIB** 30–14	9,459	
^{#}Rankings from AP Poll released prior to game. All times are in Eastern Time.

=== Week 11 ===
Date	Time	Visiting team	Home team	Site	TV	Result	Attendance	Ref.
November 14	1:00 p.m.	**Kennesaw State**	**Sam Houston**	Bowers Stadium • Huntsville, TX	ESPN+	**KENN** 26–7		
November 14	2:00 p.m.	**New Mexico State**	**Missouri State**	Robert W. Plaster Stadium • Springfield, MO	ESPN+	**MSU** 27–21 ^{OT}		
November 14	2:00 p.m.	**FIU**	**Delaware**	Delaware Stadium • Newark, DE	ESPN+	**DEL** 24–16		
November 14	2:30 p.m.	**Middle Tennessee**	**Liberty**	Williams Stadium • Lynchburg, VA	CBSSN	**LIB** 28–23		
November 14	2:30 p.m.	**Jacksonville State**	**Western Kentucky**	Houchens Industries–L. T. Smith Stadium • Bowling Green, KY	ESPN+	**WKU** 35–24		
^{#}Rankings from AP Poll released prior to game. All times are in Eastern Time.

=== Week 12 ===
Date	Time	Visiting team	Home team	Site	TV	Result	Attendance	Ref.
November 21	1:00 p.m.	**Western Kentucky**	**Liberty**	Williams Stadium • Lynchburg, VA		**LIB** 45–14		
November 21	2:00 p.m.	**Middle Tennessee**	**Sam Houston**	Bowers Stadium • Huntsville, TX		**MTSU** 31–28		
November 21	2:00 p.m.	**Missouri State**	**Jacksonville State**	AmFirst Stadium • Jacksonville, AL		**JVST** 25–20		
November 21	3:00 p.m.	**Delaware**	**New Mexico State**	Aggie Memorial Stadium • Las Cruces, NM		**DEL** 42–30		
November 21	3:00 p.m.	**FIU**	**Kennesaw State**	Fifth Third Stadium • Kennesaw, GA		**KENN** 35–24		
^{#}Rankings from AP Poll released prior to game. All times are in Eastern Time.

=== Week 13 ===
Date	Time	Visiting team	Home team	Site	TV	Result	Attendance	Ref.
November 28	1:00 p.m.	**Kennesaw State**	**Western Kentucky**	Houchens Industries–L. T. Smith Stadium • Bowling Green, KY	ESPN+			
November 28	2:00 p.m.	**Liberty**	**Missouri State**	Robert W. Plaster Stadium • Springfield, MO	ESPN+			
November 28	2:00 p.m.	**Sam Houston**	**FIU**	Pitbull Stadium • Miami, FL	ESPN+			
November 28	2:00 p.m.	**New Mexico State**	**Middle Tennessee**	Johnny "Red" Floyd Stadium • Murfreesboro, TN	ESPN+			
November 28	3:30 p.m.	**Jacksonville State**	**Delaware**	Delaware Stadium • Newark, DE	CBSSN			
^{#}Rankings from AP Poll released prior to game. All times are in Eastern Time.

=== Week 14 - Conference championship ===
Date	Time	Visiting team	Home team	Site	TV	Result	Attendance	Ref.
December 4				TBD • TBD				
^{#}Rankings from AP Poll released prior to game. All times are in Eastern Time.

== Conference USA records vs. other conferences ==
2026–2027 records against non-conference foes, including bowl games:

Regular season

Power Four Conferences	Record
ACC	0–3
Big 12	0–2
Big Ten	0–1
Notre Dame	0–0
SEC	0–4
Power 5 Total	0–10
Other FBS Conferences	Record
American	0–3
Independents (Excluding Notre Dame)	0–0
MAC	2–1
Mountain West	1–4
Pac-12	0–0
Sun Belt	3–6
Other FBS Total	6–14
FCS Opponents	Record
Football Championship Subdivision	10–0
Total Non-Conference Record	16–24

=== Conference USA vs Power 4 matchups ===
This is a list of games Conference USA has scheduled versus power conference teams (ACC, Big Ten, Big 12, Notre Dame and SEC). All rankings are from the current AP Poll at the time of the game.

Date	Conference	Visitor	Home	Site	Score
August 29	ACC	New Mexico State	Florida State	Doak Campbell Stadium • Tallahassee, FL	L 17–34
September 5	SEC	Missouri State	No. 8 Texas A&M	Kyle Field • College Station, TX	L 0–50
September 12	SEC	Western Kentucky	No. 3 Georgia	Sanford Stadium • Athens, GA	L 20–70
September 12	SEC	Delaware	Vanderbilt	FirstBank Stadium • Nashville, TN	L 26–35
September 19	Big Ten	Western Kentucky	No. 4 Indiana	Memorial Stadium • Bloomington, IN	L 0–38
September 19	SEC	Kennesaw State	No. 15 Tennessee	Neyland Stadium • Knoxville, TN	L 9–42
September 26	Big 12	Sam Houston	No. 11 Texas Tech	Galaxy Stadium • Lubbock, TX	L 14–49
September 26	ACC	Missouri State	No. 22 SMU	Gerald J. Ford Stadium • University Park, TX	L 24–34
September 26	ACC	Delaware	Virginia	Scott Stadium • Charlottesville, VA	L 3–42
October 3	Big 12	Middle Tennessee	Kansas	David Booth Kansas Memorial Stadium • Lawrence, KS	L 0–55

=== Conference USA vs other FBS matchups ===
The following games include Conference USA teams competing against teams from the American, MAC, Mountain West, Pac-12 or Sun Belt.

Date	Conference	Visitor	Home	Site	Score
August 29	Mountain West	Jacksonville State	North Dakota State	Fargodome • Fargo, ND	L 7–33
September 5	Sun Belt	Liberty	James Madison	Bridgeforth Stadium • Harrisonburg, VA	L 13–20
September 5	American	FIU	South Florida	Raymond James Stadium • Tampa, FL	L 9–19
September 5	Sun Belt	Sam Houston	Troy	Veterans Memorial Stadium • Troy, AL	L 21–24
September 5	Mountain West	Western Kentucky	Nevada	Mackay Stadium • Reno, NV	L 14–49
September 12	MAC	Jacksonville State	Ohio	Peden Stadium • Athens, OH	L 27–29
September 12	MAC	Buffalo	FIU	Pitbull Stadium • Miami, FL	W 33–20
September 12	American	Tulsa	Sam Houston	Bowers Stadium • Huntsville, TX	L 17–23
September 12	Sun Belt	Georgia State	Kennesaw State	Fifth Third Stadium • Kennesaw, GA	L 17–31
September 12	Sun Belt	Middle Tennessee	Marshall	Joan C. Edwards Stadium • Huntington, WV	L 26–28
September 12	Mountain West	New Mexico State	Hawaii	Clarence T. C. Ching Athletics Complex • Honolulu, HI	L 19–29
September 19	Sun Belt	Coastal Carolina	Delaware	Delaware Stadium • Newark, DE	W 22–14
September 19	MAC	Ball State	Liberty	Williams Stadium • Lynchburg, VA	W 51–15
September 19	American	FIU	Florida Atlantic	Flagler Credit Union Stadium • Boca Raton, FL	L 10–16
September 19	Sun Belt	Marshall	Missouri State	Robert W. Plaster Stadium • Springfield, MO	L 24–30
September 19	Sun Belt	Georgia Southern	Jacksonville State	AmFirst Stadium • Jacksonville, AL	W 31–27
September 19	Mountain West	Nevada	Middle Tennessee	Johnny "Red" Floyd Stadium • Murfreesboro, TN	W 27–20
September 24	Sun Belt	Liberty	Coastal Carolina	Brooks Stadium • Conway, SC	W 34–17
September 24	Mountain West	New Mexico	New Mexico State	Aggie Memorial Stadium • Las Cruces, NM	L 18–42
September 24	Sun Belt	Kennesaw State	Arkansas State	Centennial Bank Stadium • Jonesboro, AR	L 14–17

=== Conference USA vs. FCS matchups ===
The following games include Conference USA teams competing against FCS schools.

Date	Visitor	Home	Site	Score
September 3	Merrimack	Delaware	Delaware Stadium • Newark, DE	W 42–7
September 3	West Georgia	Kennesaw State	Fifth Third Stadium • Kennesaw, GA	W 47–0
September 5	Murray State	Middle Tennessee	Johnny "Red" Floyd Stadium • Murfreesboro, TN	W 38–14
September 5	Eastern Kentucky	Jacksonville State	AmFirst Stadium • Jacksonville, AL	W 49–7
September 5	Mercyhurst	New Mexico State	Aggie Memorial Stadium • Las Cruces, NM	W 51–14
September 12	Gardner-Webb	Liberty	Williams Stadium • Lynchburg, VA	W 24–23
September 12	Lindenwood	Missouri State	Robert W. Plaster Stadium • Springfield, MO	W 48–14
September 19	Nicholls	Sam Houston	Bowers Stadium • Huntsville, TX	W 59–0
September 26	LIU	FIU	Pitbull Stadium • Miami, FL	W 20–3
September 26	Mercyhurst	Western Kentucky	Houchens Industries–L. T. Smith Stadium • Bowling Green, KY	W 52–7

== Awards and honors ==
=== Player of the week honors ===
Week	Offensive			Defensive			Special Teams			Freshman			Offensive Line		
Week	Player	Team	Position	Player	Team	Position	Player	Team	Position	Player	Team	Position	Player	Team	Position
Week 0	Trey Hedden	New Mexico State	QB	Gabe Peterson	New Mexico State	DE	Conor Donaghy	Jacksonville State	P	Carson Su’esu’e	New Mexico State	TE	Ma’Kyi Lee	New Mexico State	OT
Week 1	Jamill Williams	Jacksonville State	WR	Nick Session	New Mexico State	S	Triston Morgan	Kennesaw State	AP	Kevin Moore	Delaware	S	Lance Johnson	Jacksonville State	OG
Week 2	J. J. Kohl	FIU	QB	Elisha Baldridge	FIU	DE	Dominic Bourgeois	Middle Tennessee	K	Felix Visser	FIU	P	Zaire Flournoy	FIU	OG
Week 3	Sean Wilson	Delaware	WR	Jackson Lowe	Middle Tennessee	DB	Caleb Nix	Jacksonville State	S/PR	Tristan Lyles	Jacksonville State	LB	Reese Tripp	Middle Tennessee	OT
Week 4	Caden Creel	Jacksonville State	QB	Ronald Moore Jr.	Liberty	S	Garrison Rippa	Jacksonville State	K	Jonathan Stafford Jr.	Jacksonville State	WR	D.J. Geth	Liberty	OT
Week 5	James Jones	New Mexico State	RB	Aidan Vaughan	Liberty	LB	Chase Reeves	Liberty	K	Jonathan Stafford Jr. (2)	Jacksonville State	WR	Alex Birchmeier	Liberty	OG
Week 6	Caden Creel (2)	Jacksonville State	QB	Tywon Christopher	Kennesaw State	LB	Robert Czeremcha	FIU	K	Jonathan Stafford Jr. (3)	Jacksonville State	WR	D.J. Geth (2)	Liberty	OT
Week 7	Roman Gagliano	Middle Tennessee	QB	Jared Lloyd	Missouri State	LB	Yousef Obeid	Missouri State	K	Tyler Bell	Delaware	QB	Ryan Walker	Jacksonville State	OG
Week 8	Nick Minicucci	Delaware	QB	Jawarren Corbin	Delaware	LB	Dominic Bourgeois (2)	Middle Tennessee	K	Xavier Rucker	New Mexico State	S	Steven Demboski	Delaware	C
Week 9	Nick Minicucci (2)	Delaware	QB	Tywon Christopher (2)	Kennesaw State	LB	Davis Bryson	Kennesaw State	WR/KR	Kevin Moore (2)	Delaware	S	Lance Johnson (2)	Jacksonville State	OG
