= 2026 Missouri State Bears football team =

American college football season

2026 Missouri State Bears football
- Conference: Conference USA
- Record: 4–7 (3–4 CUSA)
- Head coach: Casey Woods (1st season)
- Offensive coordinator: Mark Cala (1st season)
- Offensive scheme: Spread
- Defensive coordinator: Jack Curtis (1st season)
- Base defense: 4–2–5
- Home stadium: Robert W. Plaster Stadium

2026 Conference USA football standings
	Conf.			Overall
Team	W		L	W		L
Liberty y	7	–	0	9	–	1
Jacksonville State y	6	–	1	8	–	3
Kennesaw State	4	–	3	5	–	6
Middle Tennessee	4	–	3	6	–	5
Delaware	4	–	3	6	–	5
Western Kentucky	3	–	4	4	–	7
Missouri State	3	–	4	4	–	7
FIU	2	–	5	4	–	7
New Mexico State	2	–	5	3	–	8
Sam Houston	0	–	7	1	–	10
Championship: Jacksonville State at Liberty
y – Championship game participant; As of November 22, 2026; Rankings from AP poll

The 2026 Missouri State Bears football team represents Missouri State University as a member of Conference USA (CUSA) during the 2026 NCAA Division I FBS football season. The team is led by first-year head coach Casey Woods, and play their home games at Robert W. Plaster Stadium located in Springfield, Missouri.

The 2026 season is Missouri State's second season in Conference USA and at the FBS level after transitioning from the NCAA Division I Football Championship Subdivision (FCS).

== Schedule ==
Date	Time	Opponent	Site	TV	Result	Attendance
September 5	6:00 p.m.	at No. 8 Texas A&M*	Kyle Field; College Station, TX	ESPN	L 0–50	107,782
September 12	6:00 p.m.	Lindenwood (FCS)*	Robert W. Plaster Stadium; Springfield, MO	ESPN+	W 48–14	12,138
September 19	5:30 p.m.	Marshall*	Robert W. Plaster Stadium; Springfield, MO	CBSSN	L 24–30	16,010
September 26	8:00 p.m.	at No. 22 SMU*	Gerald J. Ford Stadium; Dallas, TX	ACCN	L 24–34	31,987
October 8	6:00 p.m.	at Western Kentucky	Houchens Industries–L. T. Smith Stadium; Bowling Green, KY	CBSSN	L 13–34	11,102
October 14	6:30 p.m.	Kennesaw State	Robert W. Plaster Stadium; Springfield, MO	CBSSN	W 24–21	9,044
October 20	6:00 p.m.	at Delaware	Delaware Stadium; Newark, DE	ESPNU	L 38–61	14,214
October 27	7:00 p.m.	Sam Houston	Robert W. Plaster Stadium; Springfield, MO	ESPN2	W 24–3	11,119
November 7	3:00 p.m.	at FIU	Pitbull Stadium; Miami, Florida	ESPN+	L 20–23	10,575
November 14	2:00 p.m.	New Mexico State^{†}	Robert W. Plaster Stadium; Springfield, MO	ESPN+	W 27–21 ^{OT}	12,767
November 21	1:00 p.m.	at Jacksonville State	AmFirst Stadium; Jacksonville, AL	ESPN+	L 20–25	16,307
November 28	1:00 p.m.	Liberty	Robert W. Plaster Stadium; Springfield, MO (Senior Day)	ESPN+	–	
*Non-conference game; ^{†}Homecoming; Rankings from Coaches' Poll released prior to the game; All times are in Central time

== Game summaries ==
=== at Texas A&M ===
Missouri State Bears (0–0) at No. 8 Texas A&M Aggies (0–0) – Game summary

Quarter	1	2	3	4	Total
Bears	0	0	0	0	0
No. 8 Aggies	9	10	14	17	50

at Kyle Field • College Station, Texas

- Date: September 5
- Game time: 6:00 p.m. CDT
- Game weather: Cloudy • Temperature: 84 °F (29 °C) • Wind: NE at 18 miles per hour (29 km/h)
- Game attendance: 107,782
- Referee: Tim Barker
- TV announcers (ESPN): Lowell Galindo, Kirk Morrison, and Dawn Davenport

Game information

First quarter

- TA&M – Isaiah Horton 15-yard pass from Marcel Reed (David Olano kick), 9:32. Aggies 7–0. Drive: 8 plays, 58 yards, 4:05.
- TA&M – Team safety, 0:26. Aggies 9–0.

Second quarter

- TA&M – David Olano 28-yard field goal, 3:22. Aggies 12–0. Drive: 6 plays, 40 yards, 2:35.
- TA&M – Mario Craver 12-yard pass from Marcel Reed (David Olano kick), 0:29. Aggies 19–0. Drive: 5 plays, 23 yards, 2:11.

Third quarter

- TA&M – Terry Bussey 10-yard run (David Olano kick), 9:56. Aggies 26–0. Drive: 11 plays, 70 yards, 5:04.
- TA&M – Jamarion Morrow 2-yard run (David Olano kick), 2:09. Aggies 33–0. Drive: 14 plays, 71 yards, 6:41.

Fourth quarter

- TA&M – Carsyn Baker 12-yard run (David Olano kick), 13:35. Aggies 40–0. Drive: 4 plays, 54 yards, 1:57.
- TA&M – Aaron Gregory 15-yard pass from Brady Hart (David Olano kick), 12:52. Aggies 47–0. Drive: 1 play, 15 yards, 0:05.
- TA&M – Asher Murray 47-yard field goal, 4:04. Aggies 50–0. Drive: 12 plays, 56 yards, 5:16.

Statistics	MOST	TAMU
First downs	4	35
Plays–yards	40–67	65–505
Rushes–yards	23–37	47–236
Passing yards	30	269
Passing: comp–att–int	8–17–0	25–38–0
Turnovers	3	1
Time of possession	16:57	43:03

Team	Category	Player	Statistics
Missouri State	Passing	Skyler Locklear	8/17, 30 yards
Missouri State	Rushing	Breezy Dubar	7 carries, 20 yards
Missouri State	Receiving	Dillon Hipp	2 receptions, 15 yards
Texas A&M	Passing	Marcel Reed	21/30, 233 yards, 2 TD
Texas A&M	Rushing	Rueben Owens II	17 carries, 77 yards
Texas A&M	Receiving	Isaiah Horton	4 receptions, 76 yards, TD

=== Lindenwood (FCS) ===
Lindenwood Lions (FCS) (1–1) at Missouri State Bears (0–1) – Game summary

Quarter	1	2	3	4	Total
Lions (FCS)	0	0	7	7	14
Bears	14	20	14	0	48

at Robert W. Plaster Stadium • Springfield, Missouri

- Date: September 12
- Game time: 6:00 p.m. CDT
- Game weather: Sunny • Temperature: 86 °F (30 °C) • Wind: NW at 7 miles per hour (11 km/h)
- Game attendance: 12,138
- Referee: Jeremee Tate
- TV announcers (ESPN+): Dom West (play-by-play), Tom Mast (analyst) and Cierra Clark (sideline)

Game information

First quarter

- MOST – Isaiah Myers 24-yard run (Stewart McDonald kick), 10:39. Bears 7–0. Drive: 11 plays, 75 yards, 4:21.
- MOST – Connor Lair 1-yard run (Stewart McDonald kick), 0:07. Bears 14–0. Drive: 4 plays, 48 yards, 1:35.

Second quarter

- MOST – Ramone Green Jr. 1-yard run (Stewart McDonald kick), 11:21. Bears 21–0. Drive: 7 plays, 62 yards, 2:21.
- MOST – Isaiah Myers 72-yard pass from Skyler Locklear (Stewart McDonald kick failed), 10:01. Bears 27–0. Drive: 1 play, 72 yards, 0:10.
- MOST – Breezy Dubar 10-yard run (Stewart McDonald kick), 5:20. Bears 34–0. Drive: 7 plays, 72 yards, 3:13.

Third quarter

- MOST – Ramone Green Jr. 1-yard run (Stewart McDonald kick), 7:13. Bears 41–0. Drive: 10 plays, 69 yards, 4:21.
- LIN – Drew Krobath 15-yard pass from Pops Battle (Will Graham kick), 4:07. Bears 41–7. Drive: 8 plays, 65 yards, 3:06.
- MOST – Henry Belin IV 16-yard run (Stewart McDonald kick), 0:00. Bears 48–7. Drive: 3 plays, 68 yards, 0:37.

Fourth quarter

- LIN – Elijah Roy 32-yard pass from Pops Battle (Will Graham kick), 12:21. Bears 48–14. Drive: 6 plays, 75 yards, 2:41.

Statistics	LIN	MOST
First downs	11	27
Plays–yards	54–223	78–569
Rushes–yards	34–118	53–249
Passing yards	105	320
Passing: comp–att–int	8–20–1	21–25–0
Turnovers	2	0
Time of possession	25:50	34:10

Team	Category	Player	Statistics
Lindenwood	Passing	Pops Battle	8/20, 105 yards, 2 TD, INT
Lindenwood	Rushing	Pops Battle	14 carries, 63 yards
Lindenwood	Receiving	Elijah Roy	4 receptions, 72 yards, TD
Missouri State	Passing	Skyler Locklear	17/20, 258 yards, TD
Missouri State	Rushing	Ramone Green Jr.	12 carries, 80 yards, 2 TD
Missouri State	Receiving	Isaiah Myers	5 receptions, 155 yards, TD

=== Marshall ===
Marshall Thundering Herd (1–1) at Missouri State Bears (1–1) – Game summary

Quarter	1	2	3	4	Total
Thundering Herd	14	3	10	3	30
Bears	10	0	14	0	24

at Robert W. Plaster Stadium • Springfield, Missouri

- Date: September 19
- Game time: 5:30 p.m. CDT
- Game weather: Sunny • Temperature: 95 °F (35 °C) • Wind: SW 11 mph
- Game attendance: 16,010
- Referee: Chris Brison
- TV announcers (CBSSN): Jason Knapp (play by play) and Emory Hunt (analyst)

Game information
- (9:24) MRSH – TJ Lester 39 yard pass from Carlos Del Rio-Wilson, Jorge Diaz Nicolas kick (Drive: 7 plays, 80 yards, 3:17; Marshall 7–0)
- (5:45) MOST – Yousef Obeid 35 yard field goal (Drive: 10 plays, 67 yards, 3:39; Marshall 7–3)
- (2:25) MRSH – Jo'Shon Barbie 1 yard run, Jorge Diaz Nicolas kick (Drive: 7 plays, 60 yards, 3:14; Marshall 14–3)
- (0:12) MOST – Witt Edwards 38 yard pass from Skyler Locklear, Yousef Obeid kick (Drive: 6 plays, 75 yards, 2:13; Marshall 14–10)

Second quarter

- (8:14) MRSH – Jorge Diaz Nicolas 28 yard field goal (Drive: 13 plays, 65 yards, 6:51; Marshall 17–10)

Third quarter

- (13:36) MRSH – Carlos Del Rio-Wilson 6 yard run, Jorge Diaz Nicolas kick (Drive: 4 plays, 48 yards, 1:20; Marshall 24–10)
- (9:56) MOST – Jambres Dubar 1 yard run, Yousef Obeid kick (Drive: 8 plays, 75 yards, 3:40; Marshall 24–17)
- (5:40) MRSH – Jorge Diaz Nicolas 32 yard field goal (Drive: 10 plays, 46 yards, 4:10; Marshall 27–17)
- (2:06) MOST – Jeron Askren 25 yard pass from Skyler Locklear, Yousef Obeid kick (Drive: 9 plays, 75 yards, 3:34; Marshall 27–24)

Fourth quarter

- (10:20) MRSH – Jorge Diaz Nicolas 31 yard field goal (Drive: 13 plays, 64 yards, 6:40; Marshall 30–24)

Statistics	MRSH	MOST
First downs	25	24
Plays–yards	71–464	65–506
Rushes–yards	45–267	36–186
Passing yards	197	320
Passing: comp–att–int	17–26–0	20–29–1
Turnovers	1	1
Time of possession	34:29	25:31

Team	Category	Player	Statistics
Marshall	Passing	Carlos Del Rio-Wilson	16/25, 176 yards, TD
Marshall	Rushing	Jo'Shon Barbie	12 carries, 81 yards, TD
Marshall	Receiving	Xayvion Turner-Bradshaw	6 receptions, 73 yards
Missouri State	Passing	Skyler Locklear	19/28, 309 yards, 2 TD, INT
Missouri State	Rushing	Ramone Green Jr.	15 carries, 76 yards
Missouri State	Receiving	Isaiah Myers	7 receptions, 141 yards

=== at No. 22 SMU ===
Missouri State Bears (1–2) at No. 22 SMU Mustangs (2–1) – Game summary

Quarter	1	2	3	4	Total
Bears	0	0	0	0	0
No. 22 Mustangs	0	0	0	0	0

at Gerald J. Ford Stadium • University Park, Texas

- Date: September 26
- Game time: 8:00 p.m. CDT
- TV announcers (ACCN): Roxy Bernstein (play-by-play), Dave Clawson (analyst), and Madison Hock (sideline)

Game information

First quarter
Second quarter
Third quarter
Fourth quarter

Statistics	MOST	SMU
First downs		
Total yards		
Rushing yards		
Passing yards		
Passing: comp–att–int		
Turnovers		
Time of possession		

Team	Category	Player	Statistics
Missouri State	Passing		
Missouri State	Rushing		
Missouri State	Receiving		
SMU	Passing		
SMU	Rushing		
SMU	Receiving		

=== at Western Kentucky ===
Missouri State Bears (1–3) at Western Kentucky Hilltoppers (1–4) – Game summary

Quarter	1	2	Total
Bears			0
Hilltoppers			0

at Houchens Industries–L. T. Smith Stadium • Bowling Green, Kentucky

- Date: October 8
- Game time: 6:00 p.m.
- TV: CBS Sports Network

Game information

First quarter
Second quarter
Third quarter
Fourth quarter

Statistics	MOST	WKU
First downs		
Total yards		
Rushes–yards		
Passing yards		
Passing: Comp–Att–Int		
Turnovers		
Time of possession		

Team	Category	Player	Statistics
Missouri State	Passing		
Missouri State	Rushing		
Missouri State	Receiving		
Western Kentucky	Passing		
Western Kentucky	Rushing		
Western Kentucky	Receiving		

=== Kennesaw State ===
Kennesaw State Owls (1–4) at Missouri State Bears (1–4) – Game summary

Quarter	1	2	3	4	Total
Owls	0	0	0	0	0
Bears	0	0	0	0	0

at Robert W. Plaster Stadium • Springfield, Missouri

- Date: October 14
- Game time: 7:30 p.m.
- TV: CBSSN

Game information

First quarter
Second quarter
Third quarter
Fourth quarter

Statistics	KENN	MOST
First downs		
Plays–yards		
Rushes–yards		
Passing yards		
Passing: Comp–Att–Int		
Turnovers		
Time of possession		

Team	Category	Player	Statistics
Kennesaw State	Passing		
Kennesaw State	Rushing		
Kennesaw State	Receiving		
Missouri State	Passing		
Missouri State	Rushing		
Missouri State	Receiving		

=== at Delaware ===
Missouri State Bears (2–4) at Delaware Fightin' Blue Hens (2–4) – Game summary

Quarter	1	2	3	4	Total
Bears	0	0	0	0	0
Fightin' Blue Hens	0	0	0	0	0

at Delaware Stadium • Newark, Delaware

- Date: October 20
- Game time: TBD p.m. EDT

Game information

First quarter
Second quarter
Third quarter
Fourth quarter

Statistics	MOST	DEL
First downs		
Plays–yards		
Rushes–yards		
Passing yards		
Passing: comp–att–int		
Turnovers		
Time of possession		

Team	Category	Player	Statistics
Missouri State	Passing		
Missouri State	Rushing		
Missouri State	Receiving		
Delaware	Passing		
Delaware	Rushing		
Delaware	Receiving		

=== Sam Houston ===
Sam Houston Bearkats (1–6) at Missouri State Bears (2–5) – Game summary

Quarter	1	2	3	4	Total
Bearkats	0	0	0	0	0
Bears	0	0	0	0	0

at Robert W. Plaster Stadium • Springfield, Missouri

- Date: October 27
- Game time: 7:00 p.m. CDT
- TV: ESPN2

Game information

First quarter
Second quarter
Third quarter
Fourth quarter

Statistics	SHSU	MOST
First downs		
Total yards		
Rushing yards		
Passing yards		
Passing: comp–att–int		
Turnovers		
Time of possession		

Team	Category	Player	Statistics
Sam Houston	Passing		
Sam Houston	Rushing		
Sam Houston	Receiving		
Missouri State	Passing		
Missouri State	Rushing		
Missouri State	Receiving		

=== at FIU ===
Missouri State Bears (3–5) at FIU Panthers (3–5) – Game summary

Quarter	1	2	3	4	Total
Bears	0	0	0	0	0
Panthers	0	0	0	0	0

at Pitbull Stadium • Miami, FL

- Date: November 7
- Game time: 4:00 p.m.
- TV: ESPN networks

Game information

First quarter
Second quarter
Third quarter
Fourth quarter

Statistics	MOST	FIU
First downs		
Total yards		
Rushing yards		
Passing yards		
Passing: Comp–Att–Int		
Turnovers		
Time of possession		

Team	Category	Player	Statistics
Missouri State	Passing		
Missouri State	Rushing		
Missouri State	Receiving		
FIU	Passing		
FIU	Rushing		
FIU	Receiving		

=== New Mexico State ===
New Mexico State Aggies (3–6) at Missouri State Bears (3–6) – Game summary

Quarter	1	2	3	4	Total
Aggies	0	0	0	0	0
Bears	0	0	0	0	0

at Robert W. Plaster Stadium • Springfield, Missouri

- Date: November 14
- Game time: 1:00 p.m. MST

Game information

First quarter
Second quarter
Third quarter
Fourth quarter

Statistics	NMSU	MOST
First downs		
Plays–yards		
Rushes–yards		
Passing yards		
Passing: comp–att–int		
Turnovers		
Time of possession		

Team	Category	Player	Statistics
New Mexico State	Passing		
New Mexico State	Rushing		
New Mexico State	Receiving		
Missouri State	Passing		
Missouri State	Rushing		
Missouri State	Receiving		

=== at Jacksonville State ===
Missouri State Bears (4–6) at Jacksonville State Gamecocks (7–3) – Game summary

Quarter	1	2	3	4	Total
Bears	0	0	0	0	0
Gamecocks	0	0	0	0	0

at AmFirst Stadium • Jacksonville, Alabama

- Date: November 21
- Game time: 1:00 p.m.

Game information

First quarter
Second quarter
Third quarter
Fourth quarter

Statistics	MOST	JVST
First downs		
Plays–yards		
Rushes–yards		
Passing yards		
Passing: comp–att–int		
Turnovers		
Time of possession		

Team	Category	Player	Statistics
Missouri State	Passing		
Missouri State	Rushing		
Missouri State	Receiving		
Jacksonville State	Passing		
Jacksonville State	Rushing		
Jacksonville State	Receiving		

=== Liberty (Senior Day) ===
Liberty Flames (0–0) at Missouri State Bears (0–0) – Game summary

Quarter	1	2	3	4	Total
Flames	0	0	0	0	0
Bears	0	0	0	0	0

at Robert W. Plaster Stadium • Springfield, Missouri

- Date: November 28
- Game time: 2:00 p.m. ET

Game information

First quarter
Second quarter
Third quarter
Fourth quarter

Statistics	LIB	MOST
First downs		
Plays–yards		
Rushes–yards		
Passing yards		
Passing: comp–att–int		
Turnovers		
Time of possession		

Team	Category	Player	Statistics
Liberty	Passing		
Liberty	Rushing		
Liberty	Receiving		
Missouri State	Passing		
Missouri State	Rushing		
Missouri State	Receiving		

== Personnel ==
=== Roster ===
2026 Missouri State Bears football team roster
Players
Coaches
Offense

Pos.	#	Name	Class
WR	0	Jmariyae Robinson	Sr
RB	1	Breezy Dubar	Sr
QB	2	Henry Belin IV	Sr
WR	3	Isaiah Myers	Sr
WR	6	Mekhi Miller	Sr
QB	7	Elijah Leonard	So
WR	8	Isaiah McMorris	So
QB	9	Skyler Locklear	Sr
RB	10	King Davis	Fr
WR	11	Makai Cope	Sr
QB	12	Brett Ottensmeyer	Fr
RB	13	Josh Joyner	Fr
QB	15	Eian Finkley	Jr
WR	17	Brendon McQueen	So
RB	22	Ramone Green Jr.	Jr
WR	34	Jordan Manuel	Fr
RB/TE	40	Connor Lair	Sr
WR/CB	42	Devin Staley	Fr
RB	43	Amar'e Johnson	Fr
TE/FB	46	Cash Pomeroy	Fr
OL	51	Chase Mideau	Fr
OL	54	Matthew Greene	Jr
OL	55	Ryan Mitchell	So
OL	66	Makhete Gueye	Sr
OL	67	Ben Liedtke	Jr
OL	69	Armend Ujkashi	Sr
OL	70	William Dixon III	Sr
OL	71	King Large	So
OL	72	Isaiah Villanueva	Sr
OL	73	Myles Ewell	So
OL	74	Julius Dumas	Fr
OL	75	Logan Scrivner	So
OL	76	Santiago Castillo	Fr
OL	77	Sebastian Espinoza	Jr
OL	78	Brayden Thompson	Fr
OL	79	Stephen Meitz	Fr
TE/DL	80	Michael Osei-Bonsu	Sr
WR	81	A. J. Bell Jr.	Fr
WR	82	Brycen Dorsey	Fr
WR	83	Amare Whetsell	Fr
WR	84	Antonio Robinson	Sr
TE	85	Dillon Hipp	So
TE	86	James Rexroat	So
TE	87	Witt Edwards	So
TE	88	Jeron Askren	So
WR	89	Torrin Teague	Fr

Defense

Pos.	#	Name	Class
LB	0	Jared Lloyd	Sr
S	2	Antonio Smith	Jr
S	3	Khalil Anderson	Sr
DE	5	Kellen Lindstrom	So
CB	6	Navonn Barrett	Sr
CB	7	Malik Ganaway	Sr
CB	8	Joel Kpassou	Sr
CB	9	Dylan Dixson	Sr
CB	10	Jalile Elliott	So
DL	11	Tim Brantley Jr.	Sr
CB	12	Joel Boamah	Jr
S	13	Hayden Caston	Fr
S	14	Jerrick Martin	Fr
LB	15	Martavis Blackmon	Jr
S	16	J.J. O'Neal	Sr
CB	18	Sean Reese	Sr
S	19	Xavian Michel	So
CB	20	Floyd Williams	Jr
LB	21	Jashawn Cooper	So
LB	22	Grayson Cutchlow	So
CB	23	Gionni McBride	Fr
LB	24	Caleb Olabode	So
CB	25	Camron Williams	So
CB	26	Darryon Taylor	Sr
CB	27	Devin Rutherford	So
CB	28	Joseph Arnold	Fr
S	29	Christian Ford	Jr
DE	30	Caden Wiest	Jr
LB	31	Cooper Roy	Jr
LB	32	Heiko Malone	So
S	33	Anthony Mattison	Jr
LB	35	Austin Yelder	Jr
S	37	Josiah Turner	Fr
LB	38	Stratton Shufelt	Jr
S	39	Rory Butler	Fr
LB	41	Deion Thomas	Fr
DL	44	Malachi Madison	Sr
LB	45	Royal Weber	Fr
LB	48	Jedrick Russell Jr.	Fr
DE	49	Dylan Brooks	Sr
DL	52	Kaden Jones	Jr
DL	56	Jayden McGee	Fr
DL	57	Gilles Tchio	Sr
DE	59	Maurice Jones Jr.	Fr
DL	90	Brandon Hightower	Fr
DE	92	Josh Lukusa	Sr
DL	94	Breylon McCuller	Fr
DE	96	Blessing Igbinedion	Jr
DL	97	Joshua Davis	Jr
DL	98	Cam Gray	Fr
DL	99	Markell Chapman	Jr

Special teams

Pos.	#	Name	Class
K/P	25	Stewart McDonald	So
K	36	Yousef Obeid	Jr
K	37	Josh Deal	Jr
LS	47	Andrew Kallas	Jr
LS	50	Tim Coleman	So
LS	65	Malakai Lewis	Fr

Head coach

- Casey Woods

Coordinators/assistant coaches

- Jack Curtis – Defensive coordinator/safeties
- Mark Cala – Offensive coordinator/quarterbacks
- Sparky Woods – Chief of staff/offensive special teams
- John Bonney – Cornerbacks
- Al Davis – Defensive tackles
- Tyler Foster – Running backs
- Sam Hullender – Tight ends
- Brett Kulka – Defensive ends
- Hussam Ouri – Offensive line
- Blake Shrader – Linebackers/defensive special teams
- Jacoby Walker – Wide receivers
- Jermaine Saffold – Assistant wide receivers
- Adam Ieyoub – Assistant special teams
- Harrison Buecking – Offensive graduate assistant
- Drew Davis – Defensive graduate assistant
- Jack Hoffman – Offensive graduate assistant
- Clayton Long – Defensive graduate assistant

Legend

- (C) Team captain
- (S) Suspended
- (I) Ineligible
- Injured
- Redshirt

Roster
Last update: 9/17/26

=== Transfers ===
==== Outgoing ====
Player	Position	Destination
Deuce Bailey	QB	Coastal Carolina
Dezmond Barnes	DL	Coastal Carolina
Tristian Gardner	WR	Coastal Carolina
Ryan Grayson	CB	Coastal Carolina
Jackson Kohl	TE	Coastal Carolina
Cristian Loaiza	OT	Coastal Carolina
Don Quist	S	Coastal Carolina
Ahmad Poole	DL	Coastal Carolina
Braxton Starnes	LB	Coastal Carolina
Mitchell Toney	DL	Coastal Carolina
Mitch Weisenborn	LS	Coastal Carolina
D.J. Wesolak	EDGE	Coastal Carolina
Ronnel Johnson	WR	Jacksonville State
Ebubedike Nnabugwu	IOL	South Carolina
Cash Hudson	IOL	South Florida
Jeron Askren	TE	Unknown
Tim Brantley Jr.	DL	Unknown
JJ O'Neal	S	Unknown
Floyd Williams	CB	Unknown

==== Incoming ====
Player	Position	Previous school
Jalile Elliott	EDGE	Barton
Geo Jallah	S	Benedict
Breezy Dubar	RB	Boise State
Henry Belin IV	QB	Duke
Joel Kpassou	CB	Duquesne
Markell Chapman	DL	Iowa State
Isaiah Villanueva	IOL	Jackson State
Dylan Brooks	EDGE	Kansas
Joel Boamah	CB	Kent State
Josh Lukusa	EDGE	Miami (OH)
King Large	IOL	SMU
Xavien Michel	S	Tabor (KS)
Kellen Lindstrom	EDGE	Tennessee
Mekhi Miller	WR	Tulsa
Malachi Madison	DL	UMass
Skyler Locklear	QB	UTEP
Stratton Shufelt	LB	UTEP
Tim Coleman	LS	UVA Wise
Witt Edwards	TE	Vanderbilt
William Dixon III	OT	VMI
Isaiah Myers	WR	Western Kentucky
