= 2026 Western Kentucky Hilltoppers football team =

American college football season

2026 Western Kentucky Hilltoppers football
- Conference: Conference USA
- Record: 4–7 (3–4 CUSA)
- Head coach: Tyson Helton (8th season)
- Offensive coordinator: Bodie Reeder (1st season)
- Co-offensive coordinator: Joe Bernardi (1st season)
- Offensive scheme: Air raid
- Defensive coordinator: Davis Merritt (2nd season)
- Base defense: 3–3–5
- Home stadium: Houchens Industries–L. T. Smith Stadium

2026 Conference USA football standings
| | Conf. | | | Overall |
| Team | W | | L | W | | L |
|---|---|---|---|---|---|---|
| Liberty y | 7 | – | 0 | 9 | – | 1 |
| Jacksonville State y | 6 | – | 1 | 8 | – | 3 |
| Kennesaw State | 4 | – | 3 | 5 | – | 6 |
| Middle Tennessee | 4 | – | 3 | 6 | – | 5 |
| Delaware | 4 | – | 3 | 6 | – | 5 |
| Western Kentucky | 3 | – | 4 | 4 | – | 7 |
| Missouri State | 3 | – | 4 | 4 | – | 7 |
| FIU | 2 | – | 5 | 4 | – | 7 |
| New Mexico State | 2 | – | 5 | 3 | – | 8 |
| Sam Houston | 0 | – | 7 | 1 | – | 10 |
Championship: Jacksonville State at Liberty
y – Championship game participant; As of November 22, 2026; Rankings from AP poll

The 2026 Western Kentucky Hilltoppers football team is who represents Western Kentucky University as they are a member of Conference USA (CUSA) during the 2026 NCAA Division I FBS football season. The Hilltoppers are led by Tyson Helton in his eighth year as the head coach and play their home games at Houchens Industries–L. T. Smith Stadium, located in Bowling Green, Kentucky.

== Offseason ==
=== Departures ===
- WR Matthew Henry
- DB Avarion Cole
- DB Jaylen Wester
- DB Kent Robinson
- DB Demarko Williams
- DL Jayden Gray
- DL Jaden Hardy
- DE Dominic Oliver

==== Outgoing transfers ====
| Name | No. | Pos. | Height | Weight | Year | Hometown | New school |
|---|---|---|---|---|---|---|---|
| Moussa Barry | 3 | WR | 6'2" | 194 | Rs-JR | Norcross, GA | Withdrew/remained at WKU |
| Jalen Emery | 5 | DB | 5'10" | 185 | Rs-SR | Pearland, TX | |
| Nazir Ward | 6 | DB | 6'0" | 185 | Rs-SO | Miami, FL | Syracuse |
| Miller Malone | 8 | LB | 6'2" | 216 | SO | Mont Belvieu, TX | Houston |
| Dylan Flowers | 10 | DB | 5'10" | 178 | Rs-SR | Playa Del Rey, CA | Duke |
| Tucker Parks | 11 | QB | 6'2" | 202 | Rs-FR | Spring, TX | Abilene Christian |
| La'Vell Wright | 11 | RB | 6'0" | 222 | GS | Louisville, KY | Pitt |
| Damari Jefferson | 12 | WR | 5'9" | 175 | Rs-FR | Louisville, KY | |
| Jaavan Mack | 12 | DB | 5'10" | 188 | SR | Athens, GA | |
| Robby Harrison | 13 | DL | 6'4" | 320 | Rs-JR | Greenwood, SC | Colorado State |
| Marvin Sims | 18 | WR | 5'11" | 180 | Rs-JR | Miami, FL | Austin Peay |
| Marvis Perrish | 21 | RB | 5'11" | 196 | FR | Valdosta, GA | Michigan State |
| Korbyn Green | 23 | DB | 5'11" | 176 | Rs-JR | Tulsa, OK | Tulsa |
| Jai Eugene Jr. | 26 | DB | 6'1" | 202 | Rs-SO | Destrehan, LA | Syracuse |
| Donovan Jones | 26 | RB | 5'10" | 208 | Rs-FR | Dacula, GA | |
| Corey Landers Jr. | 27 | RB | 5'8" | 195 | Rs-SO | Montgomery, AL | Houston Christian |
| Javan McMahan | 28 | RB | 5'9" | 210 | Rs-FR | Chattanooga, TN | |
| Eli Jones | 33 | LB | 6'1" | 236 | Rs-JR | Knoxville, TN | Austin Peay |
| Koron Hayward | 34 | LB | 6'5" | 248 | Rs-SO | Jacksonville, FL | TCU |
| Kennon Loftin | 38 | LB | 6'2" | 228 | JR | Laurel, MS | Nicholls |
| Jack Cassidy | 42 | K | 6'6" | 230 | Rs-JR | Maghera, Northern Ireland | West Virginia |
| Harper Holloman | 44 | DE | 6'2" | 255 | SO | Atlanta, GA | West Virginia |
| Konner Olson | 49 | K | 6'0" | 210 | GR | Gilbert, AZ | New Mexico |
| Laurence Seymore | 50 | OL | 6'2" | 320 | Rs-SR | Miami Gardens, FL | Texas |
| Caleb Nitta | 60 | OL | 6'2" | 302 | SR | Leesburg, VA | Oklahoma |
| Branden Hollis | 71 | OL | 6'8" | 376 | FR | Dundalk, MD | East Texas A&M |
| Melvin Collins Jr. | 77 | OL | 6'4" | 320 | Rs-JR | Terry, MS | Jackson State |
| Isaiah Myers | 80 | WR | 6'4" | 188 | Rs-JR | Cincinnati, OH | Missouri State |
| Noah Meyers | 81 | TE | 6'5" | 240 | Rs-SO | Louisville, KY | Syracuse |
| Chukwunedu Okeke | 90 | DL | 6'4" | 305 | SO | Mableton, GA | JMU |
| Virgil Marshall | | DB | 5'11" | | SR | Cocoa, FL | Jackson State |
| Victory Vaka | | DL | 6'2" | 350 | SR | Westlake Village, CA | |
| Dylan Vickerson | | WR | 6'1" | 210 | FR | Miami, FL | Alabama State |

==== Coaching departures ====
| Name | Previous Position | New Position |

=== Acquisitions ===
==== Incoming transfers ====
| Name | No. | Pos. | Height | Weight | Year | Hometown | Prev. School |
|---|---|---|---|---|---|---|---|
| Geajorm Akpaloo | 18 | LB | 6'1" | 230 | Junior | Warrenton, VA | Coastal Carolina |
| BJ Carey | 12 | DB | 6'0" | 200 | Rs-Senior | Downey, CA | Weber State |
| CC Ezirim | 14 | TE | 6'7" | 250 | Rs-Senior | Dublin, OH | Toledo |
| Rhett Larson | 70 | OL | 6'4" | 315 | Rs-Senior | College Station, TX | Sam Houston |
| Tyreek Major | 78 | OL | 6'5" | 325 | Rs-Senior | Tampa, FL | USF |
| Roq Montgomery | 55 | OL | 6'3" | 365 | Rs-Junior | Anniston, AL | Alabama |
| Tai Ray | 67 | OL | 6'7" | 330 | Rs-Junior | Apopka, FL | Pitt |
| Zion Taylor | 17 | WR | 6'0" | 210 | Rs-Junior | Norcross, GA | Georgia Tech |

==== Recruiting class ====
College recruiting (2026)
| Name | Hometown | School | Height | Weight | Commit date |
|---|---|---|---|---|---|
| | | | N/A | N/A | |
Recruit ratings: No ratings found
Overall recruit ranking:
Note: In many cases, Scout, Rivals, 247Sports, On3, and ESPN may conflict in their listings of height and weight.; In these cases, the average was taken. ESPN grades are on a 100-point scale.; Sources:

==== Walk-ons ====
| Player | Number | Position | Height | Weight | Class | Hometown | Previous school |

==== Coaches acquisitions ====
| Name | Previous Position | New Position |

== Preseason ==
=== Pro Day ===
WKU held its annual Pro Day on March 10, 2026, at the Harold and Juanita Koon Football Complex, Tim and Sarah Ford Fieldhouse, and Houchens Industries–L. T. Smith Stadium.

Participants included:

- LB Anthony Breckenridge
- K John Cannon
- DB Avarion Cole
- DB Jalen Emery
- TE Elvin Fofonah
- DL Jayden Gray
- RB George Hart III
- WR Matthew Henry
- OL Marshall Jackson
- OL Quincy Jenkins
- DB Jaavan Mack
- WR Jairus Mack
- DL Malotumau Mackavelli
- P Cole Maynard
- QB Maverick McIvor
- LB Dominic Oliver
- LS Rex Robich
- DB Kent Robinson
- DL Rylan Su'a-Filo
- WR Jaleel Walker
- TE Jackson West
- LB Jaylen Wester
- DB Demarko Williams
- WR Kelby Williams
- TE Justin Wolf

=== Spring game ===
WKU held its Red and White Spring Showcase game on April 11, 2026. The offense faced the defense in what ended with a 33–33 tie.

== Schedule ==
| Date | Time | Opponent | Site | TV | Result | Attendance |
|---|---|---|---|---|---|---|
| September 5 | 9:30 p.m. | at Nevada* | Mackay Stadium; Reno, NV | CBSSN | L 14–49 | 19,404 |
| September 12 | 11:45 a.m. | at No. 2 Georgia* | Sanford Stadium; Athens, GA | SECN | L 20–70 | 93,033 |
| September 19 | 3:00 p.m. | at No. 4 Indiana* | Memorial Stadium; Bloomington, IN | NBCSN/Peacock | L 0–38 | 54,695 |
| September 26 | 6:00 p.m. | Mercyhurst* | Houchens Industries–L. T. Smith Stadium; Bowling Green, KY | ESPN+ | W 52–7 | 17,247 |
| October 1 | 7:00 p.m. | at New Mexico State | Aggie Memorial Stadium; Las Cruces, NM | CBSSN | L 13–34 | 5,513 |
| October 8 | 6:00 p.m. | Missouri State | Houchens Industries–L. T. Smith Stadium; Bowling Green, KY | CBSSN | W 34–13 | 11,102 |
| October 14 | 7:00 p.m. | at Sam Houston | Elliott T. Bowers Stadium; Huntsville, TX | ESPN2 | W 16–3 | 7,291 |
| October 27 | 6:00 p.m. | Delaware | Houchens Industries–L. T. Smith Stadium; Bowling Green, KY | CBSSN | L 21–35 | 12,147 |
| November 7 | 2:30 p.m. | at Middle Tennessee | Johnny "Red" Floyd Stadium; Murfreesboro, TN (100 Miles of Hate) | ESPN+ | L 42–51 | 12,127 |
| November 14 | 2:30 p.m. | Jacksonville State | Houchens Industries–L. T. Smith Stadium; Bowling Green, KY | ESPN+ | W 34–24 | 10,112 |
| November 21 | 12:00 p.m. | at Liberty | Williams Stadium; Lynchburg, VA | ESPN+ | L 14–45 | 13,053 |
| November 28 | 12:00 p.m. | Kennesaw State | Houchens Industries–L. T. Smith Stadium; Bowling Green, KY | ESPN+ | | |
*Non-conference game; Rankings from Coaches' Poll released prior to the game; All times are in Central time; Source:

== Game summaries ==
=== at Nevada ===
Western Kentucky Hilltoppers (0–0) at Nevada Wolf Pack (0–0) – Game summary

| Quarter | 1 | 2 | 3 | 4 | Total |
|---|---|---|---|---|---|
| Hilltoppers | 0 | 7 | 0 | 7 | 14 |
| Wolf Pack | 14 | 7 | 14 | 14 | 49 |

at Mackay Stadium • Reno, Nevada

- Date: September 5
- Game time: 9:30 p.m
- Game weather: Clear • Temperature: 65 °F (18 °C) • Wind: SW at 14 miles per hour (23 km/h)
- Game attendance: 19,404
- Referee: Kenneth Ray
- TV announcers (CBS Sports Network): Rich Waltz, Adam Breneman and Jordan Giorgio

Game information

First quarter

- NEV – Dominic Kelley 72-yard run (Joe McFadden kick), 14:25. Wolf Pack 7–0. Drive: 2 plays, 75 yards, 0:35.
- NEV – Herschel Turner 8-yard run (Joe McFadden kick), 2:17. Wolf Pack 14–0. Drive: 11 plays, 88 yards, 4:25.

Second quarter

- WKU – Ajay Allen 4-yard run (Michael Smith kick), 5:20. Wolf Pack 14–7. Drive: 13 plays, 80 yards, 6:17.
- NEV – Donnie Cheers 20-yard run (Joe McFadden kick), 2:21. Wolf Pack 21–7. Drive: 3 plays, 96 yards, 1:07.

Third quarter

- NEV – Donnie Cheers 32-yard pass from Carter Jones (Joe McFadden kick), 11:01. Wolf Pack 28–7. Drive: 6 plays, 57 yards, 2:15.
- NEV – DJ Asiasi 14-yard pass from Carter Jones (Joe McFadden kick), 4:03. Wolf Pack 35–7. Drive: 5 plays, 55 yards, 2:03.

Fourth quarter

- NEV – Dominic Kelley 1-yard run (Joe McFadden kick), 7:38. Wolf Pack 42–7. Drive: 13 plays, 57 yards, 8:24.
- NEV – Carter Jackson 1-yard run (Joe McFadden kick), 6:07. Wolf Pack 49–7. Drive: 2 plays, 8 yards, 0:47.
- WKU – Ajay Allen 10-yard run (Michael Smith kick), 1:18. Wolf Pack 49–14. Drive: 12 plays, 75 yards, 4:49.

| Statistics | WKU | NEV |
|---|---|---|
| First downs | 23 | 20 |
| Plays–yards | 82–367 | 58–486 |
| Rushes–yards | 42–164 | 42–323 |
| Passing yards | 203 | 163 |
| Passing: comp–att–int | 24–40–0 | 9–16–1 |
| Turnovers | 2 | 1 |
| Time of possession | 32:33 | 27:27 |

| Team | Category | Player | Statistics |
|---|---|---|---|
| Western Kentucky | Passing | Rodney Tisdale Jr. | 24/40, 203 yards |
| Western Kentucky | Rushing | Ajay Allen | 21 carries, 102 yards, 2 TD |
| Western Kentucky | Receiving | Cameron Flowers | 7 receptions, 60 yards |
| Nevada | Passing | Carter Jones | 9/15, 163 yards, 2 TD, INT |
| Nevada | Rushing | Dominic Kelley | 11 carries, 152 yards, 2 TD |
| Nevada | Receiving | Gary Givens III | 2 receptions, 83 yards |

=== at No. 2 Georgia ===
Sanford Stadium during the Georgia–Western Kentucky game

Western Kentucky Hilltoppers (0–1) at No. 2 Georgia Bulldogs (1–0) – Game summary

| Quarter | 1 | 2 | 3 | 4 | Total |
|---|---|---|---|---|---|
| Hilltoppers | 0 | 6 | 0 | 14 | 20 |
| No. 2 Bulldogs | 21 | 28 | 14 | 7 | 70 |

at Sanford Stadium • Athens, Georgia

- Date: September 12
- Game time: 11:45 a.m. CDT
- Game weather: Rain • Temperature: 81 °F (27 °C) • Wind: SW 8 mph (13 km/h)
- Game attendance: 93,033
- Referee: David Smith
- TV announcers (SECN): Taylor Zarzour, Matt Stinchcomb and Michella Chester
- Report: Official report

Game information

First quarter

- (13:59) UGA – Ethan Barbour 7-yard pass from Gunner Stockton, Peyton Woodring kick (Drive: 2 plays, 18 yards, 0:55; Georgia 7–0)
- (11:28) UGA – Nate Frazier 7-yard run, Peyton Woodring kick (Drive: 2 plays, 50 yards, 0:51; Georgia 14–0)
- (7:37) UGA – Chauncey Bowens 21-yard pass from Gunner Stockton, Peyton Woodring kick (Drive: 7 plays, 64 yards, 3:21; Georgia 21–0)

Second quarter

- (13:28) UGA – London Humphreys 3-yard pass from Gunner Stockton, Peyton Woodring kick (Drive: 9 plays, 80 yards, 3:45; Georgia 28–0)
- (9:22) UGA – Sacovie White-Helton 70-yard pass from Gunner Stockton, Peyton Woodring kick (Drive: 3 plays, 78 yards, 1:26; Georgia 35–0)
- (7:44) UGA – Talyn Taylor 5-yard pass from Gunner Stockton, Peyton Woodring kick (Drive: 2 plays, 16 yards, 0:33; Georgia 42–0)
- (5:51) UGA – Landon Roldan 9-yard run, Peyton Woodring kick (Drive: 3 plays, 16 yards, 1:20; Georgia 49–0)
- (1:14) WKU – Brock Glenn 15-yard run, Michael Smith PAT failed (Drive: 3 plays, 16 yards, 1:20; Georgia 49–6)

Third quarter

- (14:04) UGA – Ryan Puglisi 70-yard run, Peyton Woodring kick (Drive: 3 plays, 84 yards, 0:52; Georgia 56–6)
- (4:17) UGA – Tyriq Green 0-yard fumble recovery, Peyton Woodring kick (Drive: 2 plays, 0 yards, 0:38; Georgia 63–6)

Fourth quarter

- (5:10) WKU – Brock Glenn 10-yard run, Karl Campbell kick (Drive: 4 plays, 64 yards, 1:46; Georgia 63–13)
- (4:57) UGA – Tyriq Green 91-yard kickoff return, Peyton Woodring kick (Drive: 1 play, 91 yards, 0:00; Georgia 70–13)
- (1:17) WKU – Coleson Arends 7-yard pass from Brock Glenn, Karl Campbell kick (Drive: 4 plays, 23 yards, 1:03; Georgia 70–20)

| Statistics | WKU | UGA |
|---|---|---|
| First downs | 17 | 18 |
| Plays–yards | 74–225 | 60–493 |
| Rushes–yards | 37–110 | 35–234 |
| Passing yards | 115 | 259 |
| Passing: comp–att–int | 18–37–2 | 16–25–0 |
| Turnovers | 4 | 2 |
| Time of possession | 31:06 | 28:54 |

| Team | Category | Player | Statistics |
|---|---|---|---|
| Western Kentucky | Passing | Brock Glenn | 12/23, 84 yards, TD, INT |
| Western Kentucky | Rushing | Brock Glenn | 13 carries, 70 yards, 2 TD |
| Western Kentucky | Receiving | Quincy Burroughs | 2 receptions, 29 yards |
| Georgia | Passing | Gunner Stockton | 13/16, 234 yards, 5 TD |
| Georgia | Rushing | Ryan Puglisi | 2 carries, 79 yards, TD |
| Georgia | Receiving | Sacovie White-Helton | 1 reception, 70 yards, TD |

The University of Georgia paid WKU $1.9 million for the matchup. Georgia defeated the Hilltoppers 70–20.

=== at No. 4 Indiana ===
Western Kentucky Hilltoppers (0–2) at No. 4 Indiana Hoosiers (2–0) – Game summary

| Quarter | 1 | 2 | 3 | 4 | Total |
|---|---|---|---|---|---|
| Hilltoppers | 0 | 0 | 0 | 0 | 0 |
| No. 4 Hoosiers | 0 | 14 | 17 | 7 | 38 |

at Memorial Stadium • Bloomington, Indiana

- Date: September 19
- Game time: 3:00 p.m
- Game weather: Sunny
- Game attendance: 54,695
- Referee: David Siegle
- TV announcers (Peacock): Dan Hicks, Yogi Roth and Carolina Pineda

Game information

First quarter

No scoring plays

Second quarter

- IU - Davion Chandler 26-yard pass from Josh Hoover (Paddy McAteer kick), 9:51. Hoosiers 7-0. Drive: 12 plays, 98 yards, 6:19.
- IU - Lee Beebe Jr. 1-yard run (Paddy McAteer kick), 0:37. Hoosiers 14-0. Drive: 2 plays, 3 yards, 0:30.

Third quarter

- IU - Paddy McAteer 21-yard field goal, 11:43. Hoosiers 17-0. Drive: 7 plays, 58 yards, 3:13
- IU - Charlie Becker 79-yard pass from Josh Hoover (Paddy McAteer kick), 10:43. Hoosiers 24-0 Drive: 1 play, 79 yards, 0:12.
- IU - Lee Beebe Jr. 2-yard run (Paddy McAteer kick), 1:38. Hoosiers 31-0 Drive: 6 plays, 50 yards, 3:07

Fourth quarter

- IU - Turbo Richard 25-yard run (Paddy McAteer kick), 7:10. Hoosiers 38-0 Drive: 7 plays, 80 yards, 3:56

| Statistics | WKU | IU |
|---|---|---|
| First downs | 10 | 24 |
| Total yards | 186 | 513 |
| Rushes–yards | 29–66 | 41–233 |
| Passing yards | 120 | 280 |
| Passing: Comp–Att–Int | 17–31–1 | 19–25–0 |
| Time of possession | 25:09 | 34:51 |

| Team | Category | Player | Statistics |
|---|---|---|---|
| Western Kentucky | Passing | Brock Glenn | 17/32, 120 yards, INT |
| Western Kentucky | Rushing | Brock Glenn | 11 carries, 30 yards |
| Western Kentucky | Receiving | CC Ezirim | 2 receptions, 30 yards |
| Indiana | Passing | Josh Hoover | 18/24, 273 yards, 2 TD |
| Indiana | Rushing | Turbo Richard | 15 carries, 149 yards, TD |
| Indiana | Receiving | Charlie Becker | 5 receptions, 127 yards, TD |

=== Mercyhurst (FCS) ===
Mercyhurst Lakers (FCS) (1–3) at Western Kentucky Hilltoppers (0–3) – Game summary

| Quarter | 1 | 2 | 3 | 4 | Total |
|---|---|---|---|---|---|
| Lakers (FCS) | 0 | 0 | 7 | 0 | 7 |
| Hilltoppers | 10 | 21 | 14 | 7 | 52 |

at Houchens Industries–L. T. Smith Stadium • Bowling Green, Kentucky

- Date: September 26
- Game time: 6:00 p.m
- Game weather: Sunny • Temperature: 74 °F (23 °C) • Wind: Calm
- Game attendance: 17,247
- Referee: Douglas Mercer
- TV announcers (ESPN Platforms): Tyler Eaton, Terry Obee

Game information

First quarter

- (11:41) - WKU - Nigel Johnson 72-yard pass from Rodney Tisdale Jr. (Karl Campbell kick) (Drive: 3 plays, 86 yards, 1:08); Hilltoppers 7-0
- (1:01) - WKU - Karl Campbell 35-yard field goal (Drive: 13 plays, 64 yards, 6:53); Hilltoppers 10-0

Second quarter

- (12:52) - WKU - Cameron Flowers 23-yard pass from Rodney Tisdale Jr. (Karl Campbell kick) (Drive: 4 plays, 69 yards, 2:08); Hilltoppers 17-0
- (4:41) - WKU - Brock Glenn 1-yard run (Karl Campbell kick) (Drive: 12 plays, 85 yards, 5:47); Hilltoppers 24-0
- (1:07) - WKU - Ajay Allen 41-yard pass from Rodney Tisdale Jr. (Karl Campbell kick) (Drive: 4 plays, 46 yards, 0:43); Hilltoppers 31-0

Third quarter

- (11:16) - WKU - Quincy Burroughs 20-yard pass from Rodney Tisdale Jr. (Karl Campbell kick) (Drive: 7 plays, 71 yards, 3:26); Hilltoppers 38-0
- (7:34) - WKU - Lofton Howard 3-yard pass from Brock Glenn (Karl Campbell kick) (Drive: 9 plays, 43 yards, 2:38); Hilltoppers 45-0
- (1:39) - MERC - Sha'lik Hampton 10-yard pass from Alex Gevaudan (Rocco Marcantonio kick) (Drive: 10 plays, 89 yards, 5:39); Hilltoppers 45-7

Fourth quarter

- (11:01) - WKU - Zion Taylor 72-yard pass from Brock Glenn (Karl Campbell kick) (Drive: 2 plays, 89 yards, 0:46); Hilltoppers 52-7

| Statistics | MERC | WKU |
|---|---|---|
| First downs | 14 | 24 |
| Total yards | 264 | 596 |
| Rushes–yards | 23-92 | 34-183 |
| Passing yards | 172 | 413 |
| Passing: Comp–Att–Int | 22-44-0 | 24-31-0 |
| Time of possession | 31:27 | 28:33 |

| Team | Category | Player | Statistics |
|---|---|---|---|
| Mercyhurst | Passing | Alex Gevaudan | 22/44, 172 yards, TD |
| Mercyhurst | Rushing | Jameir Gamble | 9 carries, 58 yards |
| Mercyhurst | Receiving | Emanuel Fincher | 4 receptions, 40 yards |
| Western Kentucky | Passing | Rodney Tisdale Jr. | 19/23, 303 yards, 4 TD |
| Western Kentucky | Rushing | Brock Glenn | 5 carries, 50 yards, TD |
| Western Kentucky | Receiving | Nigel Johnson | 1 reception, 72 yards, TD |

=== at New Mexico State ===
Western Kentucky Hilltoppers (1–3) at New Mexico State Aggies (1–3) – Game summary

| Quarter | 1 | 2 | 3 | 4 | Total |
|---|---|---|---|---|---|
| Hilltoppers | 3 | 3 | 7 | 0 | 13 |
| Aggies | 6 | 14 | 7 | 7 | 34 |

at Aggie Memorial Stadium • Las Cruces, New Mexico

- Date: October 1
- Game time: 7:00 p.m.
- Game weather: Sunny • Temperature: 75 °F (24 °C) • Wind: NE at 6 miles per hour (9.7 km/h)
- Game attendance: 5,513
- Referee: Reed Brotherton
- TV announcers (CBS Sports Network): Justin Kutcher, Ben DiNucci

Game information

First quarter

- (9:53) - WKU - Karl Campbell 45-yard field goal (Drive: 10 plays, 48 yards, 3:49); Hilltoppers 3-0
- (7:55) - NMSU - Ilya Uvaydov 52-yard field goal (Drive: 5 plays, 41 yards, 1:58); Tied 3-3
- (2:35) - NMSU - Ilya Uvaydov 28-yard field goal (Drive: 7 plays, 51 yards, 2:42); Aggies 6-3

Second quarter

- (8:36) - NMSU - De'Marcus Peters 45-yard interception return (Ilya Uvaydov kick) (Drive: 7 plays, 32 yards, 3:24); Aggies 13-3
- (2:38) - NMSU - Adam Damante 1-yard run (Ilya Uvaydov kick) (Drive: 10 plays, 78 yards, 4:41); Aggies 20-3
- (0:07) - WKU - Karl Campbell 41-yard field goal (Drive: 10 plays, 50 yards, 0:53); Aggies 20-6

Third quarter

- (11:13) - NMSU - TK King 15-yard pass from Adam Damante (Ilya Uvaydov kick) (Drive: 4 plays, 67 yards, 2:00); Aggies 27-6
- (9:24) - WKU - Brock Glenn 9-yard run (Karl Campbell kick) (Drive: 4 plays, 79 yards, 1:45); Aggies 27-13

Fourth quarter

- (3:18) - NMSU - James Jones 7-yard run (Ilya Uvaydov kick) (Drive: 8 plays, 63 yards, 4:29); Aggies 34-13

| Statistics | WKU | NMSU |
|---|---|---|
| First downs | 18 | 17 |
| Total yards | 349 | 352 |
| Rushes–yards | 31-35 | 34-206 |
| Passing yards | 314 | 146 |
| Passing: Comp–Att–Int | 29-43-1 | 15-26-1 |
| Turnovers | 1 | 1 |
| Time of possession | 30:25 | 29:35 |

| Team | Category | Player | Statistics |
|---|---|---|---|
| Western Kentucky | Passing | Rodney Tisdale Jr. | 29/40, 314 yards, INT |
| Western Kentucky | Rushing | Brock Glenn | 7 carries, 23 yards, TD |
| Western Kentucky | Receiving | Jonathan Stafford Jr. | 10 receptions, 108 yards |
| New Mexico State | Passing | Adam Damante | 15/26, 146 yards, TD, INT |
| New Mexico State | Rushing | James Jones | 20 carries, 155 yards, TD |
| New Mexico State | Receiving | Josiah Thomas | 4 receptions, 60 yards |

=== Missouri State ===
Missouri State Bears (1–3) at Western Kentucky Hilltoppers (1–4) – Game summary

| Quarter | 1 | 2 | 3 | 4 | Total |
|---|---|---|---|---|---|
| Bears | 3 | 3 | 7 | 0 | 13 |
| Hilltoppers | 7 | 14 | 3 | 10 | 34 |

at Houchens Industries–L. T. Smith Stadium • Bowling Green, Kentucky

- Date: October 8
- Game time: 6:00 p.m.
- Game weather: Sunny • Temperature: 74 °F (23 °C) • Wind: Calm
- Game attendance: 11,102
- Referee: Rodney Burnette
- TV announcers (CBS Sports Network): Justin Kutcher, Ben DiNucci

Game information

First quarter

- (6:38) - WKU - Brock Glenn 1-yard run (Karl Campbell kick) (Drive: 11 plays, 68 yards, 4:11); Hilltoppers 7-0
- (2:16) - MOST - Yousef Obeid 25-yard field goal (Drive: 11 plays, 79 yards, 4:22); Hilltoppers 7-3

Second quarter

- (6:26) - MOST - Yousef Obeid 31-yard field goal (Drive: 13 plays, 76 yards, 5:35); Hilltoppers 7-6
- (4:57) - WKU - Jonathan Stafford Jr. 42-yard pass from Brock Glenn (Karl Campbell kick) (Drive: 4 plays, 75 yards, 1:29); Hilltoppers 14-6
- (0:38) - WKU - Ajay Allen 3-yard run (Karl Campbell kick) (Drive: 8 plays, 56 yards, 2:52); Hilltoppers 21-6

Third quarter

- (7:23) - MOST - Isaiah Myers 36-yard pass from Henry Belin IV (Yousef Obeid kick) (Drive: 11 plays, 95 yards, 5:07); Hilltoppers 21-13
- (2:05) - WKU - Karl Campbell 34-yard field goal (Drive: 13 plays, 59 yards, 5:18); Hilltoppers 24-13

Fourth quarter

- (11:17) - WKU - Karl Campbell 43-yard field goal (Drive: 10 plays, 37 yards, 4:20); Hilltoppers 27-13
- (5:46) - WKU - Ajay Allen 39-yard run (Karl Campbell kick) (Drive: 4 plays, 78 yards, 2:03); Hilltoppers 34-13

| Statistics | MOST | WKU |
|---|---|---|
| First downs | 17 | 21 |
| Total yards | 340 | 464 |
| Rushes–yards | 29-136 | 40-233 |
| Passing yards | 204 | 231 |
| Passing: Comp–Att–Int | 20-38-1 | 20-35-0 |
| Turnovers | 1 | 0 |
| Time of possession | 27:39 | 32:21 |

| Team | Category | Player | Statistics |
|---|---|---|---|
| Missouri State | Passing | Henry Belin IV | 8/14, 115 yards, TD |
| Missouri State | Rushing | Skyler Locklear | 8 carries, 76 yards |
| Missouri State | Receiving | Isaiah Myers | 3 receptions, 77 yards, TD |
| Western Kentucky | Passing | Brock Glenn | 20/35, 231 yards, TD |
| Western Kentucky | Rushing | Ajay Allen | 13 carries, 105 yards, 2 TD |
| Western Kentucky | Receiving | Jonathan Stafford Jr. | 6 receptions, 72 yards, TD |

=== at Sam Houston ===
Western Kentucky Hilltoppers (2–4) at Sam Houston Bearkats (1–4) – Game summary

| Quarter | 1 | 2 | 3 | 4 | Total |
|---|---|---|---|---|---|
| Hilltoppers | 7 | 3 | 3 | 3 | 16 |
| Bearkats | 0 | 3 | 0 | 0 | 3 |

at Elliott T. Bowers Stadium • Huntsville, Texas

- Date: October 14
- Game time: 7:00 p.m.
- Game weather: Sunny • Temperature: 83 °F (28 °C) • Wind: SE 9 mph (14 km/h)
- Game attendance: 7,291
- Referee: Ron Hudson
- TV announcers (ESPN 2): Clay Matvick, Rocky Boiman

Game information

First quarter

- (10:06) - WKU - Coleson Arends 23-yard pass from Brock Glenn (Karl Campbell kick) (Drive: 11 plays, 65 yards, 4:04); Hilltoppers 7-0

Second quarter

- (12:02) - WKU - Karl Campbell 35-yard field goal (Drive: 8 plays, 48 yards, 3:12); Hilltoppers 10-0
- (5:59) - SHSU - Sam Carpenter 42-yard field goal (Drive: 6 plays, 20 yards, 1:56); Hilltoppers 10-3

Third quarter

- (0:03) - WKU - Karl Campbell 39-yard field goal (Drive: 9 plays, 59 yards, 4:19); Hilltoppers 13-3

Fourth quarter

- (10:45) - WKU - Karl Campbell 33-yard field goal (Drive: 7 plays, 25 yards, 2:35); Hilltoppers 16-3

| Statistics | WKU | SHSU |
|---|---|---|
| First downs | 17 | 12 |
| Total yards | 276 | 177 |
| Rushes–yards | 43-144 | 27-65 |
| Passing yards | 132 | 112 |
| Passing: Comp–Att–Int | 15-31-0 | 13-30-1 |
| Time of possession | 32:23 | 27:37 |

| Team | Category | Player | Statistics |
|---|---|---|---|
| Western Kentucky | Passing | Brock Glenn | 14/30, 127 yards, TD |
| Western Kentucky | Rushing | Brock Glenn | 22 carries, 54 yards |
| Western Kentucky | Receiving | Jonathan Stafford Jr. | 5 receptions, 37 yards |
| Sam Houston | Passing | Landyn Locke | 13/30, 112 yards, INT |
| Sam Houston | Rushing | MJ Dowdy | 14 carries, 55 yards |
| Sam Houston | Receiving | Chris Reed | 3 receptions, 51 yards |

=== Delaware ===
Delaware Fightin' Blue Hens (3–4) at Western Kentucky Hilltoppers (3–4) – Game summary

| Quarter | 1 | 2 | 3 | 4 | Total |
|---|---|---|---|---|---|
| Fightin' Blue Hens | 7 | 21 | 7 | 0 | 35 |
| Hilltoppers | 14 | 7 | 0 | 0 | 21 |

at Houchens Industries–L. T. Smith Stadium • Bowling Green, Kentucky

- Date: October 27
- Game time: 6:00 p.m.
- Game weather: Cloudy • Temperature: 66 °F (19 °C) • Wind: Calm
- Referee: Stuart Mullins
- TV announcers (CBS Sports Network): Justin Kutcher, Ben DiNucci

Game information

First quarter

- (11:37) - WKU - CC Ezirim 2-yard pass from Brock Glenn (Karl Campbell kick) (Drive: 8 plays, 75 yards, 3:23); Hilltoppers 7-0
- (6:43) - DEL - Kaderris Roberts 17-yard pass from Nick Minicucci (Tucker Smack kick) (Drive: 9 plays, 82 yards, 4:40); Tied 7-7
- (3:41) - WKU - Zion Taylor 1-yard run (Karl Campbell kick) (Drive: 7 plays, 75 yards, 3:02); Hilltoppers 14-7

Second quarter

- (12:42) - DEL - Sean Wilson 21-yard pass from Nick Minicucci (Tucker Smack kick) (Drive: 9 plays, 78 yards, 5:03); Tied 14-14
- (10:52) - WKU - Ajay Allen 5-yard run (Karl Campbell kick) (Drive: 4 plays, 75 yards, 1:50); Hilltoppers 21-14
- (7:25) - DEL - Viron Ellison Jr. 5-yard run (Tucker Smack kick) (Drive: 8 plays, 80 yards, 3:23); Tied 21-21
- (0:59) - DEL - Jo Silver 8-yard pass from Nick Minicucci (Tucker Smack kick) (Drive: 8 plays, 90 yards, 1:34); Fightin' Blue Hens 28-21

Third quarter

- (4:20) - DEL - Sean Wilson 40-yard pass from Nick Minicucci (Tucker Smack kick) (Drive: 6 plays, 76 yards, 2:49); Fightin' Blue Hens 35-21

Fourth quarter

No scoring plays

| Statistics | DEL | WKU |
|---|---|---|
| First downs | 25 | 24 |
| Total yards | 495 | 477 |
| Rushes–yards | 28-81 | 34-232 |
| Passing yards | 414 | 245 |
| Passing: Comp–Att–Int | 32-38-0 | 26-43-2 |
| Time of possession | 30:24 | 29:36 |

| Team | Category | Player | Statistics |
|---|---|---|---|
| Delaware | Passing | Nick Minicucci | 32/38, 414 yards, 4 TD |
| Delaware | Rushing | Jo Silver | 13 carries, 49 yards |
| Delaware | Receiving | Sean Wilson | 9 receptions, 183 yards, 2 TD |
| Western Kentucky | Passing | Brock Glenn | 25/37, 224 yards, TD, 2 INT |
| Western Kentucky | Rushing | Brock Glenn | 17 carries, 129 yards |
| Western Kentucky | Receiving | Moussa Barry | 4 receptions, 80 yards |

=== at Middle Tennessee (100 Miles of Hate) ===
Western Kentucky Hilltoppers (3–5) at Middle Tennessee Blue Raiders (4–4) – Game summary

| Quarter | 1 | 2 | 3 | 4 | Total |
|---|---|---|---|---|---|
| Hilltoppers | 0 | 13 | 14 | 15 | 42 |
| Blue Raiders | 14 | 7 | 14 | 16 | 51 |

at Johnny "Red" Floyd Stadium • Murfreesboro, Tennessee

- Date: November 7
- Game time: 2:30 p.m.
- Game weather: Sunny • Temperature: 58 °F (14 °C) • Wind: NW 11 mph (18 km/h)
- Game attendance: 12,127
- Referee: Jeremy Tate
- TV announcers (ESPN Platforms): Jake Rose, Jeremy Kellem

Game information

First quarter

- (5:09) - MTSU - Neo Clifton 25-yard pass from Roman Gagliano (Dominic Bourgeois kick) (Drive: 6 plays, 50 yards, 3:34); Blue Raiders 7-0
- (4:05) - MTSU - Ziyon Butler 65-yard pass from Roman Gagliano (Dominic Bourgeois kick) (Drive: 1 play, 65 yards, 0:10); Blue Raiders 14-0

Second quarter

- (14:56) - WKU - Karl Campbell 35-yard field goal (Drive: 11 plays, 58 yards, 4:09); Blue Raiders 14-3
- (8:18) - WKU - Brock Glenn 2-yard run (Karl Campbell kick) (Drive: 4 plays, 67 yards, 1:39); Blue Raiders 14-10
- (3:29) - WKU - Karl Campbell 42-yard field goal (Drive: 8 plays, 50 yards, 3:10); Blue Raiders 14-13
- (0:29) - MTSU - Neo Clifton 1-yard pass from Roman Gagliano (Dominic Bourgeois kick) (Drive: 13 plays, 75 yards, 3:00); Blue Raiders 21-13

Third quarter

- (14:48) - MTSU - Antonio Martin 75-yard run (Dominic Bourgeois kick) (Drive: 1 plays, 75 yards, 0:12); Blue Raiders 28-13
- (12:37) - WKU - Moussa Barry 21-yard pass from Brock Glenn (Karl Campbell kick) (Drive: 5 plays, 73 yards, 2:03); Blue Raiders 28-20
- (5:54) - MTSU - Antonio Martin 2-yard run (Dominic Bourgeois kick) (Drive: 8 plays, 54 yards, 3:58); Blue Raiders 35-20
- (4:34) - WKU - Ajay Allen 8-yard run (Karl Campbell kick) (Drive: 3 plays, 73 yards, 1:14); Blue Raiders 35-27

Fourth quarter

- (14:00) - MTSU - Koraun Perdue 4-yard pass from Roman Gagliano (Dominic Bourgeois kick) (Drive: 10 plays, 85 yards, 5:29); Blue Raiders 42-27
- (5:19) - WKU - Quincy Burroughs 8-yard pass from Rodney Tisdale Jr. (Rodney Tisdale Jr. two-point pass to Lofton Howard) (Drive: 11 plays, 87 yards, 4:54); Blue Raiders 42-35
- (0:31) - WKU - Rodney Tisdale Jr. 5-yard run (Karl Campbell kick) (Drive: 10 plays, 72 yards, 2:44); Tied 42-42
- (0:01) - MTSU - Dominic Bourgeois 48-yard field goal (Drive: 5 plays, 45 yards, 0:30); Blue Raiders 45-42
- (0:00) - MTSU - Aidan Singleton 0-yard fumble return (Drive: 1 play, 0 yards, 0:00); Blue Raiders 51-42

| Statistics | WKU | MTSU |
|---|---|---|
| First downs | 24 | 26 |
| Total yards | 497 | 513 |
| Rushes–yards | 32-238 | 30-201 |
| Passing yards | 259 | 312 |
| Passing: Comp–Att–Int | 24-36-0 | 30-42-0 |
| Turnovers | 1 | 0 |
| Time of possession | 27:11 | 32:48 |

| Team | Category | Player | Statistics |
|---|---|---|---|
| Western Kentucky | Passing | Brock Glenn | 13/23, 152 yards, TD |
| Western Kentucky | Rushing | Ajay Allen | 15 carries, 116 yards, TD |
| Western Kentucky | Receiving | Jonathan Stafford Jr. | 8 receptions, 90 yards |
| Middle Tennessee | Passing | Roman Gagliano | 30/41, 312 yards, 4 TD |
| Middle Tennessee | Rushing | Antonio Martin Jr. | 16 carries, 125 yards, 2 TD |
| Middle Tennessee | Receiving | Ziyon Butler | 6 receptions, 129 yards, TD |

=== Jacksonville State ===
Jacksonville State Gamecocks (7–2) at Western Kentucky Hilltoppers (3–6) – Game summary

| Quarter | 1 | 2 | 3 | 4 | Total |
|---|---|---|---|---|---|
| Gamecocks | 10 | 14 | 0 | 0 | 24 |
| Hilltoppers | 14 | 7 | 0 | 13 | 34 |

at Houchens Industries–L. T. Smith Stadium • Bowling Green, Kentucky

- Date: November 14
- Game time: 2:30 p.m.
- Game weather: Sunny • Temperature: 49 °F (9 °C) • Wind: N 12 mph (19 km/h)
- Game attendance: 10,112
- Referee: Rodney Burnette
- TV announcers (ESPN Platforms): Jeff Hem, Terry Obee

Game information

First quarter

- (10:19) - WKU - Ajay Allen 6-yard run (Karl Campbell kick) (Drive: 7 plays, 66 yards, 2:54); Hilltoppers 7-0
- (7:17) - JVST - Garrison Rippa 50-yard field goal (Drive: 4 plays, -6 yards, 1:32); Hilltoppers 7-3
- (7:06) - JVST - Jacob Cruz 8-yard fumble return (Garrison Rippa kick) (Drive: 1 plays, -11 yards, 0:06); Gamecocks 10-7
- (0:18) - WKU - Brock Glenn 4-yard run (Karl Campbell kick) (Drive: 12 plays, 75 yards, 6:48); Hilltoppers 14-10

Second quarter

- (12:15) - JVST - Jamill Williams 9-yard pass from Caden Creel (Garrison Rippa kick) (Drive: 6 plays, 60 yards, 3:03); Gamecocks 17-14
- (3:11) - WKU - Brock Glenn 1-yard run (Karl Campbell kick) (Drive: 16 plays, 75 yards, 9:04); Hilltoppers 21-17
- (2:37) - JVST - Luke Gilbert 7-yard pass from Caden Creel (Garrison Rippa kick) (Drive: 3 plays, 78 yards, 0:30); Gamecocks 24-21

Third quarter

No scoring plays

Fourth quarter

- (0:02) - WKU - Jyziah Rockwell 10-yard pass from Brock Glenn (Karl Campbell kick) (Drive: 11 plays, 58 yards, 4:39); Hilltoppers 28-24
- (0:00) - WKU - Dave Herard 2-yard fumble return (Drive: 1 play, -16 yards, 0:01); Hilltoppers 34-24

| Statistics | JVST | WKU |
|---|---|---|
| First downs | 10 | 23 |
| Total yards | 210 | 327 |
| Rushes–yards | 24-48 | 52-125 |
| Passing yards | 162 | 202 |
| Passing: Comp–Att–Int | 17-25-1 | 21-26-1 |
| Time of possession | 22:26 | 37:34 |

| Team | Category | Player | Statistics |
|---|---|---|---|
| Jacksonville State | Passing | Caden Creel | 17/25, 162 yards, 2 TD, INT |
| Jacksonville State | Rushing | Jalen Likely | 7 carries, 24 yards |
| Jacksonville State | Receiving | Deondre Johnson | 2 receptions, 72 yards |
| Western Kentucky | Passing | Rodney Tisdale Jr. | 14/16, 120 yards, INT |
| Western Kentucky | Rushing | Brock Glenn | 13 carries, 71 yards, 2 TD |
| Western Kentucky | Receiving | Zion Taylor | 6 receptions, 52 yards |

=== at Liberty ===
Western Kentucky Hilltoppers (4–6) at Liberty Flames (9–1) – Game summary

| Quarter | 1 | 2 | Total |
|---|---|---|---|
| Hilltoppers | | | 0 |
| Flames | | | 0 |

at Williams Stadium • Lynchburg, Virginia

- Date: November 21
- Game time: 12:00 p.m.
- TV: ESPN Platforms

Game information

First quarter
Second quarter
Third quarter
Fourth quarter

| Statistics | WKU | LIB |
|---|---|---|
| First downs | | |
| Total yards | | |
| Rushes–yards | | |
| Passing yards | | |
| Passing: Comp–Att–Int | | |
| Time of possession | | |

| Team | Category | Player | Statistics |
|---|---|---|---|
| Western Kentucky | Passing | | |
| Western Kentucky | Rushing | | |
| Western Kentucky | Receiving | | |
| Liberty | Passing | | |
| Liberty | Rushing | | |
| Liberty | Receiving | | |

=== Kennesaw State ===
Kennesaw State Owls (0–0) at Western Kentucky Hilltoppers (0–0) – Game summary

| Quarter | 1 | 2 | Total |
|---|---|---|---|
| Owls | | | 0 |
| Hilltoppers | | | 0 |

at Houchens Industries–L. T. Smith Stadium • Bowling Green, Kentucky

- Date: November 28
- TV: ESPN Platforms

Game information

First quarter
Second quarter
Third quarter
Fourth quarter

| Statistics | KENN | WKU |
|---|---|---|
| First downs | | |
| Total yards | | |
| Rushes–yards | | |
| Passing yards | | |
| Passing: Comp–Att–Int | | |
| Time of possession | | |

| Team | Category | Player | Statistics |
|---|---|---|---|
| Kennesaw State | Passing | | |
| Kennesaw State | Rushing | | |
| Kennesaw State | Receiving | | |
| Western Kentucky | Passing | | |
| Western Kentucky | Rushing | | |
| Western Kentucky | Receiving | | |

== Roster ==
2025 Western Kentucky Hilltoppers football team roster
Players
Coaches
Offense

| Pos. | # | Name | Class |
|---|---|---|---|
| WR | 2 | K.D. Hutchinson | Sr |
| RB | 3 | Ajay Allen | Sr |
| WR | 4 | Cameron Flowers | So |
| RB | 9 | Kalib Hicks | Jr |
| QB | 10 | Caleb McMickle | Jr |
| QB | 11 | Brock Glenn | Jr |
| WR | 12 | Quincy Burroughs | Sr |
| WR | 13 | Jyziah Rockwell | Sr |
| QB | 15 | Cam O'Hara | Fr |
| QB | 16 | Rodney Tisdale Jr. | So |
| WR | 17 | Zion Taylor | Jr |
| WR | 18 | Devin Hamilton | Fr |
| TE | 19 | Lofton Howard | Jr |
| TE | 20 | CC Ezirim | Sr |
| WR | 21 | Nigel Johnson | Sr |
| RB | 22 | Le'Kamren Meadows | Fr |
| RB | 23 | Sincere Baines | Sr |
| WR | 24 | Fonzy Smith | Fr |
| RB | 25 | Jaden McGill | Sr |
| RB | 29 | Adrion Boyd | Jr |
| TE | 44 | Griffin Reimer | So |
| OL | 50 | Alec Johnson | Sr |
| OL | 52 | Isiah Stoudemire | Fr |
| OL | 55 | Roq Montgomery | Jr |
| OL | 56 | Tyrell Scott | Fr |
| OL | 59 | Alex Lopez | Fr |
| OL | 63 | Quincy Jenkins | Sr |
| OL | 64 | Jackson Dialls | Fr |
| OL | 67 | Tai Ray | Jr |
| OL | 69 | Jordan Curll | Fr |
| OL | 70 | Rhett Larson | Sr |
| OL | 72 | Zach Clayton | Jr |
| OL | 73 | Nonso Omezi | Sr |
| OL | 74 | Karsten Upchurch | Sr |
| OL | 75 | Brody Riffe | Jr |
| OL | 76 | Max Thurston | So |
| OL | 77 | Jamier Smith | Fr |
| OL | 78 | Tyreek Major | So |
| OL | 79 | Asa Holbert | Fr |
| WR | 80 | Jonathan Stafford Jr. | Fr |
| TE | 81 | Arlando Crafton Jr. | Fr |
| WR | 82 | Tre'von McGory | Fr |
| WR | 83 | Qua'Vez Humphries | Sr |
| WR | 84 | Jeremiah Carroll | Sr |
| WR | 85 | Moussa Barry | Sr |
| TE | 86 | Eli Wilt | Fr |
| TE | 87 | Coleson Arends | Jr |
| TE | 88 | Aiden Miller | Jr |
| TE | 89 | Cross Nimmo | Fr |

Defense

| Pos. | # | Name | Class |
|---|---|---|---|
| DB | 7 | Jaylen Lewis | Sr |
| DB | 10 | Christian White | Sr |
| DB | 11 | Canyon Moses | Jr |
| DB | 12 | BJ Carey | Sr |
| DE | 13 | LaTrevion Thompson | Sr |
| DB | 14 | Braxton Myers | Jr |
| LB | 15 | Garrison Madden | Sr |
| DB | 16 | Darius Hampton | Sr |
| DB | 17 | Dave Herard | Sr |
| LB | 18 | Geajorm Akpaloo | Jr |
| DB | 19 | Jacob Crosby-Mosley | So |
| LB | 20 | Zach Smith | So |
| DB | 21 | Tony Newsome Jr. | Sr |
| LB | 22 | Jordan Donald | So |
| DB | 23 | PJ Souffrant | Fr |
| DB | 24 | Lataj Wright | Sr |
| DB | 25 | Xavion "Tutu" Griffin | So |
| DB | 26 | Leonzay Merzius | Fr |
| DB | 27 | Jordan Bergeron | Fr |
| DB | 28 | D'Cambren Verrett | Jr |
| LB | 29 | Joshua Mensah | Sr |
| DB | 30 | Taron Essex | Fr |
| DB | 31 | Walter Manning | So |
| LB | 32 | Weston Ard | Fr |
| DT | 33 | Zeiqui Lawton | Sr |
| LB | 34 | Makhi Brazier | Fr |
| LB | 35 | Elijah Rumph | Fr |
| DB | 36 | Khrystian Washington | Jr |
| DB | 37 | Justin Brown | Jr |
| DB | 38 | Alan Gbee | Jr |
| DB | 39 | Jaylen Pollard | Fr |
| DE | 41 | Brandon Thomas | Fr |
| LB | 44 | Kai Micatrotto | Fr |
| DE | 45 | Josaiah Knight | So |
| DE | 48 | Zsacari Minnis | So |
| DE | 50 | Elin Jones | Sr |
| DT | 51 | Zayden Walters | Fr |
| DT | 52 | Jakeem Fletcher | Sr |
| DT | 53 | Elijah Peake | Fr |
| DT | 54 | Sekou Peters | Fr |
| DE | 55 | Venson Sneed | Sr |
| DT | 56 | Kiawan Murphy | Sr |
| DE | 57 | Isaac Tanis | Fr |
| DE | 59 | Sharlandiin "Zaaq" Strange | Fr |
| DE | 90 | Bryce Fulda | Fr |
| DT | 91 | CeeJay Embry | Fr |
| DT | 92 | Javin Griffin | Sr |
| DE | 94 | Henry Smith | Fr |
| DE | 98 | Nathan Gonzalez | Sr |
| DT | 99 | Eric Etienne | So |

Special teams

| Pos. | # | Name | Class |
|---|---|---|---|
| K | 33 | Michael Smith | So |
| P | 35 | Daniel Wall | Fr |
| LS | 40 | Carson Perusse | Jr |
| K/P | 43 | Jackson Smith | Sr |
| LS | 44 | Bailey Sanders | So |
| LS | 49 | Nolan Imhoff | Jr |
| K | 58 | Michael Buck | So |
| K | 99 | Karl Campbell | Fr |

Head coach

- Tyson Helton

Coordinators/assistant coaches

- Andy LaRussa (assistant head coach / special teams coordinator)
- Davis Merritt (defensive coordinator / inside linebackers)
- Bodie Reeder (offensive coordinator / quarterbacks)
- Joe Bernardi (co-offensive coordinator / offensive line)
- Jimmy Lindsey (run game coordinator / edges / defensive line)
- Bryan Applewhite (running backs)
- Jason Barnes (wide receivers)
- Dayton LeBlanc (defensive tackle)
- Jason Martin (cornerbacks)
- David Metcalf (safeties)
- Kevin O'Brien (tight ends)
- Matt Pulford (quality control - special teams)
- Trevor Borland (quality control – quarterbacks)
- Carson Burgess (quality control - wide receivers)
- Elvin Fofonah (quality control - tight ends)
- CJ Martinez (quality control - running backs)
- Ryne Strickland (quality control - offensive line)
- Anthony Breckenridge (quality control - linebackers)
- Staymon Johnson (quality control - linebackers)
- Dean Shaffer (quality control - defensive backs)
- Terrion Thompson (quality control – defensive line)
- KaRon White (quality control - outside linebackers

Legend

- (C) Team captain
- (S) Suspended
- (I) Ineligible
- Injured
- Redshirt

Roster
Last update: Aug 12, 2026
