= 2026 Liberty Flames football team =

American college football season

2026 Liberty Flames football

C-USA Championship, vs. Jacksonville State
- Conference: Conference USA

Ranking
- AP: No. 22
- Record: 10–1 (7–0 C-USA)
- Head coach: Jamey Chadwell (4th season)
- Offensive coordinator: Newland Isaac (4th season)
- Offensive scheme: No-huddle spread option
- Defensive coordinator: Shawn Quinn (1st season)
- Base defense: Multiple
- Home stadium: Williams Stadium

2026 Conference USA football standings
	Conf.			Overall
Team	W		L	W		L
Liberty y	7	–	0	9	–	1
Jacksonville State y	6	–	1	8	–	3
Kennesaw State	4	–	3	5	–	6
Middle Tennessee	4	–	3	6	–	5
Delaware	4	–	3	6	–	5
Western Kentucky	3	–	4	4	–	7
Missouri State	3	–	4	4	–	7
FIU	2	–	5	4	–	7
New Mexico State	2	–	5	3	–	8
Sam Houston	0	–	7	1	–	10
Championship: Jacksonville State at Liberty
y – Championship game participant; As of November 22, 2026; Rankings from AP poll

The 2026 Liberty Flames football team is the program who represents Liberty University in Conference USA (C-USA) during the 2026 NCAA Division I FBS football season. The Flames play their home games at Williams Stadium located in Lynchburg, Virginia. They are led by fourth-year head coach Jamey Chadwell.

== Offseason ==
=== Transfers ===
==== Outgoing ====
Player	Position	Destination
Kaidon Whidby	LB	Alcorn State
Devin Henderson	S	Appalachian State
Evan Dickens	RB	Boston College
Vaughn Blue	RB	Central Michigan
Dylan Mullins	S	Charleston Southern
Cal Grubbs	IOL	East Tennessee State
Malachi Fannin-Render	RB	James Madison
Ryan Manis	LS	Louisville
Michael Merdinger	QB	Minnesota
Eli Sisson	TE	North Alabama
Donovan Dozier	EDGE	Northwestern State
Christian Bodnar	S	Oklahoma State
Jayden Bradford	QB	South Florida
Bryson Jennings	EDGE	Southern
Da'Jy'Quwan Jackson-Payne	OT	Southern Miss
Dexter Ricks	CB	Texas State
Donte Lee	WR	Texas Tech
Weston Woodard	EDGE	Towson
Eli Hall	DL	UAB
Connie Hewitt II	TE	UT Martin
Esom Nnajiofor	DL	Wofford
Larry Jones	EDGE	Unknown
Uriah Points	CB	Unknown
Caden Williams	RB	Unknown
Brenton Williams	EDGE	Withdrawn

==== Incoming ====
Player	Position	Previous school
Tyrell Gainey	CB	Albany State
Kanye Udoh	RB	Arizona State
Ashton Whitner	S	Ball State
Kelsey Johnson	TE	Baylor
Ashton McShane	CB	Boston College
Elijah McKenzie	CB	Bowie State
Rashawn Cunningham	WR	Charleston Southern
Justin Marshall	RB	Colorado State
Peyton Jones	RB	Duke
Henry Hicks	DL	Elizabeth City State
John Custis	DL	Emory & Henry
Kam Davis	RB	Florida State
D'Icey Hopkins	S	Georgia State
Greg Rivera	LS	Grambling State
Makai Jackson	WR	Indiana
Chase Reeves	K	McKendree
Valen Erickson	OT	NC State
Refeno Vangates	WR	North Carolina Central
Breckan Kirby	TE	North Greenville
Jude Foster	IOL	Ole Miss
Alex Birchmeier	IOL	Penn State
Kevin Evehe	OT	Saint Francis (PA)
Kyle Ferm	LB	SMU
Izaiah Guy	CB	South Florida
Jeremiah Vessel	S	UAB
Zeke Wimbush	TE	Virginia Tech
Deshawn Purdie	QB	Wake Forest
Lorenzo Payne	EDGE	West Florida
Jaylen Henderson	QB	West Virginia
Terron Kellman	RB	Wyoming

== Schedule ==
Date	Time	Opponent	Site	TV	Result	Attendance
September 5	12:00 p.m.	at James Madison*	Bridgeforth Stadium; Harrisonburg, VA (Battle of the Blue Ridge)	ESPNU	L 13–20	25,035
September 12	6:00 p.m.	Gardner–Webb*	Williams Stadium; Lynchburg, VA	ESPN+	W 24–23	15,708
September 19	4:00 p.m.	Ball State*	Williams Stadium; Lynchburg, VA	ESPN+	W 51–15	18,330
September 24	7:30 p.m.	at Coastal Carolina*	Brooks Stadium; Conway, SC (rivalry)	ESPN	W 34–17	22,116
October 2	7:00 p.m.	at Delaware	Delaware Stadium; Newark, DE	CBSSN	W 30–14	19,182
October 8	7:00 p.m.	Sam Houston	Williams Stadium; Lynchburg, VA	ESPNU	W 35–3	15,335
October 22	7:00 p.m.	at Kennesaw State	Fifth Third Stadium; Kennesaw, GA	CBSSN	W 34–6	8,159
October 31	3:30 p.m.	FIU^{†}	Williams Stadium; Lynchburg, VA	CBSSN	W 49–10	16,702
November 7	8:00 p.m.	at New Mexico State	Aggie Memorial Stadium; Las Cruces, NM	ESPNU	W 30–14	9,459
November 14	3:30 p.m.	Middle Tennessee	Williams Stadium; Lynchburg, VA	CBSSN	W 28–23	15,131
November 21	1:00 p.m.	Western Kentucky	Williams Stadium; Lynchburg, VA	ESPN+	W 45–14	13,053
November 28	2:00 p.m.	at Missouri State	Robert W. Plaster Stadium; Springfield, MO	ESPN+		
December 4		Jacksonville State	Williams Stadium; Lynchburg, VA (CUSA Championship Game)			
*Non-conference game; ^{†}Homecoming; All times are in Eastern time

== Rankings ==
Ranking movements Legend: ██ Increase in ranking ██ Decrease in ranking — = Not ranked RV = Received votes
	Week															
Poll	Pre	1	2	3	4	5	6	7	8	9	10	11	12	13	14	Final
AP	RV	—	—	—	—	—	—	—	—	RV	RV	22				
Coaches	—	—	—	—	—	—	—	—	—	RV	RV	RV				
CFP	Not released									—	—	—				Not released

== Game summaries ==
=== at James Madison (Battle of the Blue Ridge) ===
Liberty Flames (0–0) at James Madison Dukes (0–0) – Game summary

Quarter	1	2	3	4	Total
Flames	0	6	0	7	13
Dukes	7	10	3	0	20

at Bridgeforth Stadium • Harrisonburg, Virginia

- Date: Saturday, September 5, 2026
- Game time: 12:00 p.m. ET
- Game weather: Sunny
- Game attendance: 25,035
- Referee: Rodney Burnette
- TV announcers (ESPNU): Cooper Boardman (play-by-play) and Craig Haubert (analyst)

Game information

First quarter

- JMU – George Pettaway 7-yard run (Morgan Suarez kick), 4:23. Dukes 7–0. Drive: 12 plays, 80 yards, 4:16.

Second quarter

- LIB – Chase Reeves 30-yard field goal, 8:57. Dukes 7–3. Drive: 16 plays, 62 yards, 10:26.
- JMU – Morgan Suarez 46-yard field goal, 5:57. Dukes 10–3. Drive: 6 plays, 37 yards, 3:00.
- JMU – Corey Scott 5-yard pass from JC Evans (Morgan Suarez kick), 1:53. Dukes 17–3. Drive: 7 plays, 67 yards, 2:57.
- LIB – Chase Reeves 42-yard field goal, 0:00. Dukes 17–6. Drive: 7 plays, 51 yards, 1:53.

Third quarter

- JMU – Morgan Suarez 32-yard field goal, 11:11. Dukes 20–6. Drive: 9 plays, 45 yards, 3:41.

Fourth quarter

- LIB – Makai Jackson 34 yard pass from Deshawn Purdie (Chase Reeves kick), 8:33. Dukes 20–13. Drive: 4 plays, 61 yards, 1:28.

Statistics	LIB	JMU
First downs	19	15
Plays–yards	65–321	49–291
Rushes–yards	38–91	31–173
Passing yards	230	118
Passing: Comp–Att–Int	17–27–0	12–18–0
Turnovers	0	0
Time of possession	37:17	22:38

Team	Category	Player	Statistics
Liberty	Passing	Deshawn Purdie	17/27, 230 yards, TD
Liberty	Rushing	Kam Davis	16 carries, 52 yards
Liberty	Receiving	Makai Jackson	3 receptions, 73 yards, TD
James Madison	Passing	JC Evans	7/9, 61 yards, TD
James Madison	Rushing	JC Evans	9 carries, 69 yards
James Madison	Receiving	Noah Grevious	4 receptions, 39 yards

=== vs Gardner–Webb (FCS) ===
Gardner–Webb Runnin' Bulldogs (FCS) (0–2) at Liberty Flames (0–1) – Game summary

Quarter	1	2	3	4	Total
Runnin' Bulldogs (FCS)	6	14	3	0	23
Flames	14	3	0	7	24

at Williams Stadium • Lynchburg, Virginia

- Date: September 12
- Game time: 6:00 p.m. ET
- Game weather: Cloudy • Temperature: 76 °F (24 °C) • Wind: E 6 MPH
- Game attendance: 15,708
- Referee: Ron Hudson
- TV announcers (ESPN+): Matt Warner, Reginald Walker and Emily Austen

Game information

First quarter

- GWEB – Tyler Simpson 41-yard field goal, 11:54. Runnin' Bulldogs 3–0. Drive: 8 plays, 56 yards, 3:02.
- LIB – Makai Jackson 65-yard pass from Deshawn Purdie (Chase Reeves kick), 11:07. Flames 7–3. Drive: 2 plays, 70 yards, 0:40.
- LIB – Jaylon Coleman 20-yard run (Chase Reeves kick), 8:48. Flames 14–3. Drive: 1 play, 20 yards, 0:07.
- GWEB – Tyler Simpson 35-yard field goal, 5:12. Flames 14–6. Drive: 8 plays, 57 yards, 3:36.

Second quarter

- GWEB – Sabin McLaughlin 35-yard fumble return (Tyler Simpson kick), 9:11. Flames 14–13.
- GWEB – Randy Young 65-yard run (Tyler Simpson kick), 5:44. Runnin' Bulldogs 20–14. Drive: 3 plays, 71 yards, 1:24.
- LIB – Chase Reeves 30-yard field goal, 0:00. Runnin' Bulldogs 20–17. Drive: 9 plays, 68 yards, 1:28.

Third quarter

- GWEB – Tyler Simpson 27-yard field goal, 2:34. Runnin' Bulldogs 23–17. Drive: 13 plays, 70 yards, 6:34.

Fourth quarter

- LIB – Darius Copeland 54-yard pass from Jaylen Henderson (Chase Reeves kick), 2:34. Flames 24–23. Drive: 5 plays, 68 yards, 2:39.

Statistics	GWEB	LIB
First downs	23	18
Total yards	71–304	66–379
Rushing yards	33–118	45–193
Passing yards	186	186
Passing: Comp–Att–Int	16–38–2	8–21–0
Turnovers	3	2
Time of possession	30:52	29:08

Team	Category	Player	Statistics
Gardner–Webb	Passing	Cole Pennington	16/38, 186 yards, 2 INT
Gardner–Webb	Rushing	Randy Young	4 carries, 75 yards, TD
Gardner–Webb	Receiving	Kory Jones	3 receptions, 51 yards
Liberty	Passing	Deshawn Purdie	6/17, 122 yards, TD
Liberty	Rushing	Peyton Jones	13 carries, 76 yards
Liberty	Receiving	Makai Jackson	2 receptions, 69 yards, TD

=== vs Ball State ===
Ball State Cardinals (1–1) at Liberty Flames (1–1) – Game summary

Quarter	1	2	3	4	Total
Cardinals	7	0	8	0	15
Flames	13	10	14	14	51

at Williams Stadium • Lynchburg, Virginia

- Date: September 19
- Game time: 4:00 p.m. ET
- Game weather: Sunny • Temperature: 81 °F (27 °C) • Wind: E 5 MPH
- Game attendance: 18,330
- Referee: Stuart Mullins
- TV announcers (ESPN+): Matt Warner (play-by-play), Walter Virgil (analyst) and Emily Austen (sideline reporter)

Game information

First quarter

- (10:16) LIB – Makai Jackson 12-yard pass from Deshawn Purdie (Drive: 7 plays, 45 yards, 3:50; Liberty 6–0)
- (5:47) BALL – TJ Horton 2-yard run, Brody Boehm kick (Drive: 9 plays, 75 yards, 4:29; Ball State 7–6)
- (3:46) LIB – Jamari Person 16-yard pass from Deshawn Purdie, Chase Reeves kick (Drive: 4 plays, 75 yards, 2:01; Liberty 13–7)

Second quarter

- (8:48) LIB – Chase Reeves 46-yard field goal (Drive: 14 plays, 60 yards, 7:48; Liberty 16–7)
- (0:13) LIB – Jamari Person 7-yard pass from Deshawn Purdie, Chase Reeves kick (Drive: 7 plays, 62 yards, 0:56; Liberty 23–7)

Third quarter

- (11:17) LIB – Ethan Vasko 4-yard run, Chase Reeves kick (Drive: 6 plays, 77 yards, 3:38; Liberty 30–7)
- (6:59) LIB – Kam Davis 14-yard run, Chase Reeves kick (Drive: 6 plays, 69 yards, 2:22; Liberty 37–7)
- (2:42) BALL – TJ Horton 1-yard run, Keldric Luster rush (Drive: 8 plays, 75 yards, 4:17; Liberty 37–15)

Fourth quarter

- (7:29) LIB – Terron Kellman 21-yard pass from Jaylen Henderson, Tyler Black kick (Drive: 11 plays, 80 yards, 6:54; Liberty 44–15)
- (5:02) LIB – Jaylin Belford 1-yard run, Tyler Black kick (Drive: 4 plays, 16 yards, 2:08; Liberty 51–15)

Statistics	BALL	LIB
First downs	17	23
Total yards	261	460
Rushing yards	168	212
Passing yards	93	248
Passing: Comp–Att–Int	10–21–0	16–24–0
Turnovers	1	1
Time of possession	28:01	31:59

Team	Category	Player	Statistics
Ball State	Passing	Keldric Luster	10/21, 93 yards
Ball State	Rushing	TJ Horton	8 carries, 79 yards, 2 TD
Ball State	Receiving	Isaiah Thacker	4 receptions, 44 yards
Liberty	Passing	Deshawn Purdie	13/20, 211 yards, 3 TD
Liberty	Rushing	Terron Kellman	3 carries, 51 yards
Liberty	Receiving	Makai Jackson	4 receptions, 88 yards, TD

=== at Coastal Carolina (rivalry) ===
Liberty Flames (2–1) at Coastal Carolina Chanticleers (1–2) – Game summary

Quarter	1	2	3	4	Total
Flames	10	0	0	14	24
Chanticleers	3	14	0	0	17

at Brooks Stadium • Conway, South Carolina

- Date: September 24
- Game time: 7:30 p.m. ET
- Game weather: Cloudy • Temperature: 65 °F (18 °C) • Wind: S 12 MPH
- Game attendance: 22,116
- Referee: Jeremee Tate
- TV announcers (ESPN): Matt Barrie (play-by-play), Chase Daniel (analyst) and Paul Carcaterra (sideline reporter)

Game information

First quarter

- (9:43) LIB – Chase Reeves 29-yard field goal (Drive: 7 plays, 69 yards, 3:17; Flames 3–0)
- (5:19) CCU – Nico Cavanillas Alti 41-yard field goal (Drive: 13 plays, 52 yards, 4:24; Tied 3–3)
- (3:13) LIB – Makai Jackson 58-yard pass from Deshawn Purdie, Chase Reeves kick (Drive: 5 plays, 75 yards, 2:06; Flames 10–3)

Second quarter

- (5:26) CCU – Colton Hinton 24-yard pass from Deuce Bailey, Nico Cavanillas Alti kick (Drive: 9 plays, 73 yards, 4:03; Tied 10–10)
- (0:24) CCU – Tristian Gardner 39-yard pass from Deuce Bailey, Nico Cavanillas Alti kick (Drive: 8 plays, 80 yards, 1:08; Chanticleers 17–10)

Third quarter

- (13:10) LIB – Makai Jackson 33-yard pass from Deshawn Purdie, Chase Reeves kick (Drive: 4 plays, 77 yards, 1:44; Tied 17–17)
- (4:52) LIB – Chase Reeves 24-yard field goal (Drive: 10 plays, 65 yards, 5:56; Flames 20–17)

Fourth quarter

- (12:06) LIB – Ethan Vasko 8-yard run, Chase Reeves kick (Drive: 8 plays, 45 yards, 4:51; Flames 27–17)
- (1:02) LIB – Kam Davis 6-yard run from Ethan Vasko, Tyler Black kick (Drive: 3 plays, 20 yards, 0:57; Flames 34–17)

Statistics	LIB	CCU
First downs	24	18
Total yards	485	292
Rushing yards	263	79
Passing yards	222	213
Passing: Comp–Att–Int	12–18–0	17–35–2
Turnovers	2	2
Time of possession	32:41	27:19

Team	Category	Player	Statistics
Liberty	Passing	Deshawn Purdie	11/16, 216 yards, 2 TD
Liberty	Rushing	Kam Davis	18 carries, 166 yards
Liberty	Receiving	Makai Jackson	5 receptions, 149 yards, 2 TD
Coastal Carolina	Passing	Deuce Bailey	17/34, 213 yards, 2 TD, 2 INT
Coastal Carolina	Rushing	Deuce Bailey	15 carries, 31 yards
Coastal Carolina	Receiving	Tristian Gardner	4 receptions, 86 yards, TD

=== at Delaware ===
Liberty Flames (3–1) at Delaware Fightin' Blue Hens (2–2) - Game summary

Quarter	1	2	3	4	Total
Flames	6	14	3	7	30
Fightin' Blue Hens	0	0	0	14	14

at Delaware Stadium • Newark, Delaware

- Date: October 2
- Game time: 7:00 p.m. ET
- Game weather: Rain • Temperature: 82 °F (28 °C)
- Game attendance: 19,182
- Referee: Stuart Mullins
- TV announcers (CBSSN): Alex Del Barrio (play-by-play), Emory Hunt (analyst)

Statistics	LIB	DEL
First downs	23	16
Plays–yards	72–439	60–359
Rushes–yards	47–282	25–102
Passing yards	157	257
Passing: comp–att–int	13–25–0	17–35–1
Turnovers	0	2
Time of possession	38:31	21:28

Team	Category	Player	Statistics
Liberty	Passing	Deshawn Purdie	13/20, 157 yards
Liberty	Rushing	Kam Davis	17 carries, 147 yards, 2 TD
Liberty	Receiving	Makai Jackson	5 receptions, 90 yards
Delaware	Passing	EJ Archield Jr.	10/19, 137 yards
Delaware	Rushing	Tyler Bell	6 carries, 32 yards
Delaware	Receiving	Bryson Graves	3 receptions, 69 yards

=== vs Sam Houston ===
Sam Houston Bearkats (1–3) at Liberty Flames (4–1) – Game summary

Quarter	1	2	3	4	Total
Bearkats	0	3	0	0	3
Flames	7	7	7	14	35

at Williams Stadium • Lynchburg, Virginia

- Date: October 8
- Game time: 7:00 p.m. ET
- Game weather: Sunny • Temperature: 72 °F (22 °C) • Wind: NW 2 MPH
- Game attendance: 15,335
- Referee: Jeremee Tate
- TV announcers (ESPNU): Tiffany Greene (play-by-play) and Jay Walker (analyst)

Game information

First quarter
Second quarter
Third quarter
Fourth quarter

Statistics	SHSU	LIB
First downs	13	22
Plays–yards	59–243	53–411
Rushes–yards	29–105	39–297
Passing yards	138	114
Passing: comp–att–int	20–30–0	10–14–0
Turnovers	0	0
Time of possession	29:04	30:56

Team	Category	Player	Statistics
Sam Houston	Passing	Landyn Locke	20/30, 138 yards
Sam Houston	Rushing	MJ Dowdy	11 carries, 42 yards
Sam Houston	Receiving	Grady O'Neill	3 receptions, 39 yards
Liberty	Passing	Deshawn Purdie	10/14, 114 yards, TD
Liberty	Rushing	Jaylon Coleman	7 carries, 92 yards
Liberty	Receiving	Makai Jackson	3 receptions, 46 yards

=== at Kennesaw State ===
Liberty Flames (5-1) at Kennesaw State Owls (1-5) - Game summary

Quarter	1	2	3	4	Total
Flames	0	0	0	0	0
Owls	0	0	0	0	0

at Fifth Third Stadium • Kennesaw, Georgia

- Date: October 22
- Game time: 7:00 p.m. ET
- TV: CBSSN

Statistics	LIB	KENN
First downs		
Plays–yards		
Rushes–yards		
Passing yards		
Passing: comp–att–int		
Turnovers		
Time of possession		

Team	Category	Player	Statistics
Liberty	Passing		
Liberty	Rushing		
Liberty	Receiving		
Kennesaw State	Passing		
Kennesaw State	Rushing		
Kennesaw State	Receiving		

=== vs FIU ===
FIU Panthers (3-4) at Liberty Flames (6-1) - Game summary

Quarter	1	2	3	4	Total
Panthers	0	0	0	0	0
Flames	0	0	0	0	0

at Williams Stadium • Lynchburg, Virginia

- Date: October 31
- Game time: 3:30 p.m. ET
- TV: CBSSN

Statistics	FIU	LIB
First downs		
Plays–yards		
Rushes–yards		
Passing yards		
Passing: comp–att–int		
Turnovers		
Time of possession		

Team	Category	Player	Statistics
FIU	Passing		
FIU	Rushing		
FIU	Receiving		
Liberty	Passing		
Liberty	Rushing		
Liberty	Receiving		

=== at New Mexico State ===
Liberty Flames (7-1) at New Mexico State Aggies (3-5) - Game summary

Quarter	1	2	3	4	Total
Flames	0	0	0	0	0
Aggies	0	0	0	0	0

at Aggie Memorial Stadium • Las Cruces, New Mexico

- Date: November 7
- Game time: 5:00 p.m. ET
- TV: ESPNU

Statistics	LIB	NMSU
First downs		
Plays–yards		
Rushes–yards		
Passing yards		
Passing: comp–att–int		
Turnovers		
Time of possession		

Team	Category	Player	Statistics
Liberty	Passing		
Liberty	Rushing		
Liberty	Receiving		
New Mexico State	Passing		
New Mexico State	Rushing		
New Mexico State	Receiving		

=== vs Middle Tennessee ===
Middle Tennessee Blue Raiders (5–4) at Liberty Flames (8–1) – Game summary

Quarter	1	2	3	4	Total
Blue Raiders	0	0	0	0	0
Flames	0	0	0	0	0

at Williams Stadium • Lynchburg, Virginia

- Date: November 14
- Game time: 3:30 p.m. ET
- TV: CBSSN

Game information

First quarter
Second quarter
Third quarter
Fourth quarter

Statistics	MTSU	LIB
First downs		
Plays–yards		
Rushes–yards		
Passing yards		
Passing: comp–att–int		
Turnovers		
Time of possession		

Team	Category	Player	Statistics
Middle Tennessee	Passing		
Middle Tennessee	Rushing		
Middle Tennessee	Receiving		
Liberty	Passing		
Liberty	Rushing		
Liberty	Receiving		

=== vs Western Kentucky ===
Western Kentucky Hilltoppers (4-6) at Liberty Flames (9-1) - Game summary

Quarter	1	2	3	4	Total
Hilltoppers	0	0	0	0	0
Flames	0	0	0	0	0

at Williams Stadium • Lynchburg, Virginia

- Date: November 21
- Game time: 1:00 p.m. ET

Statistics	WKU	LIB
First downs		
Plays–yards		
Rushes–yards		
Passing yards		
Passing: comp–att–int		
Turnovers		
Time of possession		

Team	Category	Player	Statistics
Western Kentucky	Passing		
Western Kentucky	Rushing		
Western Kentucky	Receiving		
Liberty	Passing		
Liberty	Rushing		
Liberty	Receiving		

=== at Missouri State ===
Liberty Flames (0–0) at Missouri State Bears (0–0) – Game summary

Quarter	1	2	3	4	Total
Flames	0	0	0	0	0
Bears	0	0	0	0	0

at Robert W. Plaster Stadium • Springfield, Missouri

- Date: November 28
- Game time: 2:00 p.m. ET

Game information

First quarter
Second quarter
Third quarter
Fourth quarter

Statistics	LIB	MOST
First downs		
Plays–yards		
Rushes–yards		
Passing yards		
Passing: comp–att–int		
Turnovers		
Time of possession		

Team	Category	Player	Statistics
Liberty	Passing		
Liberty	Rushing		
Liberty	Receiving		
Missouri State	Passing		
Missouri State	Rushing		
Missouri State	Receiving		
