= Casey Woods =

American football player and coach (born 1980)

Current position
- Title: Head coach
- Team: Missouri State
- Conference: CUSA
- Record: 4–7

Biographical details
- Born: May 15, 1983 (age 43); Starkville, Mississippi, U.S.

Playing career
- 2003–2007: Tennessee
- Position: Wide receiver

Coaching career (HC unless noted)
- 2008: Tennessee (GA)
- 2009–2011: Auburn (OQC)
- 2012: Arkansas State (WR/RC)
- 2017–2019: UAB (RGC/TE/RC)
- 2020–2021: Missouri (TE/RC)
- 2022–2025: SMU (OC/TE)
- 2026–present: Missouri State

Administrative career (AD unless noted)
- 2013–2015: Auburn (dir. of player personnel)

Head coaching record
- Overall: 4–7

Casey Woods (born May 15, 1983) is an American football coach and former player. He is currently the head football coach at Missouri State University. He previously served as the offensive coordinator at Southern Methodist University. Woods played wide receiver at the University of Tennessee, Knoxville.

== Coaching career ==
=== Early career ===
Immediately following his playing days, Woods moved into a graduate assistant role with the Tennessee Volunteers, working with the wide receivers for the 2008 season.

From 2009 through 2011, Woods served as an offensive quality control coach on Gene Chizik's Auburn staff, winning a national championship in 2010. While there, he worked closely with offensive coordinator Gus Malzahn. Woods also worked closely and roomed with future head coaches Eli Drinkwitz and Rhett Lashlee during part of his time at Auburn.

=== Arkansas State ===
When Malzahn was hired as the head coach of the Arkansas State Red Wolves, he brought Woods with him to serve as his wide receivers coach and recruiting coordinator.

=== Return to Auburn ===
The following year, Malzahn was hired as the head coach at Auburn, and Woods again followed him. From 2013 to 2015, Woods served as Auburn's director of player personnel. In those three seasons, the Tigers won 27 games, including 12 in 2013, which led to an appearance in the 2014 BCS National Championship Game.

=== UAB ===
From 2017 to 2019, Woods was a part of Bill Clark's staff at UAB. He wore many hats, acting as the tight ends coach, run game coordinator, and recruiting coordinator. Woods helped the 2018 team have the best offensive season in school history. The Blazers set 21 school records in 2018, including total points (418), total yards (5,680), rushing yards (2,818), total touchdowns (53), rushing touchdowns (32), single-game total yards (668 vs. UTSA), and single-game rushing yards (419 vs. UTSA). This led to an 11–3 record and the school's first-ever Conference USA championship.

=== Missouri ===
Casey Woods served as tight ends coach and recruiting coordinator at Missouri during the 2020 and 2021 seasons following his success at UAB. There he reunited with head coach Eli Drinkwitz as part of his first staff at Missouri. In 2021, he helped lead the program to its highest-ranked recruiting class in school history, which was ranked No. 20 nationally by Rivals.

=== SMU ===
Casey Woods was hired by Rhett Lashlee to join the SMU Mustangs in December 2021 as offensive coordinator and later assumed the role of chief of staff, also coaching tight ends. Under his leadership, SMU's offense ranked among the nation's best, producing three consecutive high-scoring seasons. In 2023, Woods helped guide the Mustangs to an 11–3 record and their first conference championship since 1984, along with a final No. 22 ranking in the AP Poll. The offense set multiple program records, including total yards and first downs.

In 2024, SMU posted back-to-back 11-win seasons for the first time in program history and earned its first-ever College Football Playoff appearance as the No. 11 seed. The Mustangs averaged 36.5 points per game and scored 511 points, the third most in school history, finishing ranked as high as No. 7 in the Coaches Poll and No. 8 in the AP Poll. Woods’ tight end units were among the top in the FBS, with players earning conference honors and national recognition.

=== Missouri State ===
On December 19, 2025, Woods was hired to become the 23rd head coach of the Missouri State Bears. Missouri State University is the first head coaching job of his career. He signed a five-year deal.

== Playing career ==
After graduating from Starkville Academy, Woods played wide receiver for the Tennessee Volunteers from 2003 to 2007. He was a three-time letterman and played in 41 games as a receiver and holder on the field goal team. He was also named a team captain for his senior season in 2007. The Volunteers won 44 games during Woods' playing career, and had three 10-win seasons.

== Personal life ==
A native of Starkville, Mississippi, Woods is the son of longtime college coach Sparky Woods. He graduated with bachelor's degrees in psychology and political science in 2006, and with a master's degree in sports psychology in 2008, all from the University of Tennessee. He was also a four-time Academic All-SEC selection. Woods is married to his wife, Lauren, and the couple has five children.

== Head coaching record ==
Year	Team	Overall	Conference	Standing	Bowl/playoffs
Missouri State Bears (Conference USA) (2026–present)
2026	Missouri State	4–7	3-4		
Missouri State:		4–7	3–4		
Total:		4–7			
