= 2026 Idaho Vandals football team =

American college football season

2026 Idaho Vandals football
- Conference: Big Sky Conference
- Record: 5–7 (5–4 Big Sky)
- Head coach: Thomas Ford (2nd season)
- Offensive coordinator: Ian Shoemaker (1st season)
- Offensive scheme: Spread
- Defensive coordinator: Lee Stalker (1st season)
- Base defense: 4–2–5
- Home stadium: Kibbie Dome

2026 Big Sky Conference football standings
	Conf.			Overall
Team	W		L	W		L
No. 2 Montana State $^	8	–	1	11	–	1
No. 15 Weber State	7	–	2	8	–	4
No. 12 Northern Arizona	7	–	2	9	–	3
No. 8 Montana	6	–	3	8	–	4
No. 23 UC Davis	6	–	3	8	–	4
Idaho	5	–	4	5	–	7
Southern Utah	4	–	4	6	–	6
No. 25 Idaho State	4	–	5	7	–	5
Cal Poly	3	–	6	4	–	8
Portland State	3	–	6	3	–	9
Eastern Washington	2	–	7	3	–	9
Northern Colorado	2	–	7	3	–	9
Utah Tech	1	–	8	1	–	11
$ – Conference champion; ^ – FCS playoff participant; As of November 22, 2026; Rankings from STATS Poll

The 2026 Idaho Vandals football team represents the University of Idaho in the Big Sky Conference during the 2026 NCAA Division I FCS football season. Led by second-year head coach Thomas Ford, the Vandals play their home games on campus at the Kibbie Dome in Moscow, Idaho.

== Preseason ==
The Big Sky Conference released its preseason coaches and media polls on July 20, 2026, picking Idaho seventh in the coaches poll with 77 points and sixth in the media poll with 283 points. Defending national champion Montana State was selected first in both polls, receiving 11 of 13 first-place votes from the conference's head coaches and 35 of 38 from the media.

Brayden Rice was Idaho's only selection to the 38-member preseason All-Conference team, chosen as a special teams player. The team and the conference's preseason most valuable players were voted on by media members throughout the Big Sky and nationally.

== Schedule ==
Date	Time	Opponent	Site	TV	Result	Attendance
August 28	7:00 p.m.	at Cal Poly	Mustang Memorial Field; San Luis Obispo, CA	ESPN	L 34–38	11,186
September 3	6:00 p.m.	at No. 21 (FBS) Utah*	Rice–Eccles Stadium; Salt Lake City, UT	ESPNU	L 14–66	51,444
September 12	1:00 p.m.	No. 14 Lamar*	Kibbie Dome; Moscow, ID	SWX/ESPN+	L 17–23	9,015
September 19	1:00 p.m.	Abilene Christian*	Kibbie Dome; Moscow, ID	ESPN+	L 39–41	6,246
October 2	7:30 p.m.	No. 1 Montana State	Kibbie Dome; Moscow, ID	ESPN	W 35–34	9,231
October 10	12:00 p.m.	at Weber State	Stewart Stadium; Ogden, UT	ESPN+	L 27–38	5,785
October 17	12:00 p.m.	at No. 7 Montana	Washington–Grizzly Stadium; Missoula, MT (Little Brown Stein)	SWX/ESPN+	W 42–35	26,567
October 24	2:00 p.m.	Southern Utah^{†}	Kibbie Dome; Moscow, ID	SWX/ESPN+	W 31–28	10,369
October 31	1:00 p.m.	at Portland State	Hillsboro Stadium; Hillsboro, OR	ESPN+	W 38–14	1,910
November 7	2:00 p.m.	Eastern Washington	Kibbie Dome; Moscow, ID	SWX/ESPN+	W 62–31	10,919
November 14	5:00 p.m.	No. 23 UC Davis	Kibbie Dome; Moscow, ID	SWX/ESPN+	L 24–28	7,254
November 21	3:00 p.m.	at No. 25 Idaho State	ICCU Dome; Pocatello, ID (rivalry)	ESPN+	L 5–19	9,888
*Non-conference game; ^{†}Homecoming; Rankings from STATS Poll released prior to the game; All times are in Pacific time

== Game summaries ==
=== at Cal Poly ===
Idaho Vandals (0–0) at Cal Poly Mustangs (0–0) – Game summary

Quarter	1	2	3	4	Total
Vandals	3	7	6	18	34
Mustangs	7	14	0	17	38

at Mustang Memorial Field • San Luis Obispo, California

- Date: August 28
- Game time: 7:00 p.m. PDT
- Game weather: Cloudy, 72 °F (22 °C)
- Game attendance: 11,186
- Referee: Robert Quello
- TV announcers (ESPN): Roxy Bernstein, Dave Clawson and Madison Hock

Game information
First quarter
- CP – Alek Marshall 17-yard pass from Anthony Grigsby Jr. (Noah Thayer kick), 11:44. Mustangs 7–0. Drive: 7 plays, 48 yards, 3:05.
- IDHO – Owen Forsman 23-yard field goal, 2:47. Mustangs 7–3. Drive: 11 plays, 81 yards, 5:53.

Second quarter

- CP – Misa Paiau 1-yard pass from Anthony Grigsby Jr. (Noah Thayer kick), 9:49. Mustangs 14–3. Drive: 16 plays, 75 yards, 7:58.
- IDHO – Ferrari Miller 7-yard run (Owen Forsman kick), 4:45. Mustangs 14–10. Drive: 11 plays, 86 yards, 4:57.
- CP – Fidel Pitts 16-yard pass from Anthony Grigsby Jr. (Noah Thayer kick), 1:53. Mustangs 21–10. Drive: 6 plays, 75 yards, 2:52.

Third quarter

- IDHO – Owen Forsman 40-yard field goal, 11:02. Mustangs 21–13. Drive: 9 plays, 53 yards, 3:58.
- IDHO – Owen Forsman 44-yard field goal, 1:42. Mustangs 21–16. Drive: 12 plays, 40 yards, 6:15.

Fourth quarter

- CP – Noah Thayer 28-yard field goal, 11:40. Mustangs 24–16. Drive: 12 plays, 56 yards, 5:02.
- IDHO – Tony Harste 5-yard pass from Joshua Wood (Joshua Wood pass to Noah West-Baranco), 9:55. Tied 24–24. Drive: 3 plays, 73 yards, 1:38.
- IDHO – Tony Harste 75-yard pass from Joshua Wood (Owen Forsman kick), 6:10. Vandals 31–24. Drive: 3 plays, 78 yards, 1:00.
- CP – Anthony Grigsby Jr. 15-yard run (Noah Thayer kick), 2:16. Tied 31–31. Drive: 9 plays, 65 yards, 3:54.
- IDHO – Owen Forsman 40-yard field goal, 1:03. Vandals 34–31. Drive: 6 plays, 52 yards, 1:13.
- CP – Tayvion McCoy 34-yard pass from Anthony Grigsby Jr. (Noah Thayer kick), 0:09. Mustangs 38–34. Drive: 5 plays, 77 yards, 0:48.

Statistics	IDHO	CP
First downs	18	29
Plays–yards	59–482	78–516
Rushes–yards	34–119	42–197
Passing yards	363	319
Passing: comp–att–int	18–25–0	26–36–0
Turnovers	0	0
Time of possession	27:34	32:26

Team	Category	Player	Statistics
Idaho	Passing	Joshua Wood	18/25, 363 yards, 2 TD
Idaho	Rushing	Ferrari Miller	12 carries, 44 yards, TD
Idaho	Receiving	Tony Harste	9 receptions, 180 yards, 2 TD
Cal Poly	Passing	Anthony Grigsby Jr.	26/35, 319 yards, 4 TD
Cal Poly	Rushing	Jaden Green	15 carries, 71 yards
Cal Poly	Receiving	Tayvion McCoy	10 receptions, 170 yards, TD

=== at No. 21 (FBS) Utah ===
Idaho Vandals (0–1) at No. 21 (FBS) Utah Utes (0–0) – Game summary

Quarter	1	2	3	4	Total
Vandals	0	7	7	0	14
No. 21 (FBS) Utes	17	14	14	21	66

at Rice–Eccles Stadium • Salt Lake City, Utah

- Date: September 3
- Game time: 6:00 p.m.
- Game weather: Clear • Temperature: 83 °F (28 °C) • Wind: S 8 mph
- Game attendance: 51,444
- Referee: Mike McCabe
- TV announcers (ESPNU): Pete Sousa and Leger Douzable

Game information

First quarter

- UTAH – Wayshawn Parker 9-yard pass from Devon Dampier (Dillon Curtis kick), 12:40. Utes 7–0. Drive: 4 plays, 29 yards, 1:33.
- UTAH – Dillon Curtis 24-yard field goal, 10:40. Utes 10–0. Drive: 4 plays, 6 yards, 1:50.
- UTAH – Wayshawn Parker 21-yard run (Dillon Curtis kick), 1:07. Utes 17–0. Drive: 6 plays, 68 yards, 2:56.

Second quarter

- IDHO – Hayden Kincheloe 3-yard run (Owen Forsman kick), 9:40. Utes 17–7. Drive: 13 plays, 75 yards, 6:27.
- UTAH – Braden Pegan 7-yard pass from Devon Dampier (Dillon Curtis kick), 4:39. Utes 24–7. Drive: 11 plays, 75 yards, 5:01.
- UTAH – Wayshawn Parker 3-yard pass from Devon Dampier (Dillon Curtis kick), 0:32. Utes 31–7. Drive: 7 plays, 46 yards, 3:03.

Third quarter

- UTAH – Braden Pegan 12-yard run (Dillon Curtis kick), 13:15. Utes 38–7. Drive: 7 plays, 75 yards, 1:45.
- UTAH – Noah Bennee 35-yard pass from Byrd Ficklin (Dillon Curtis kick), 4:45. Utes 45–7. Drive: 4 plays, 44 yards, 2:23.
- IDHO – Joshua Wood 22-yard run (Owen Forsman kick), 1:21. Utes 45–14. Drive: 7 plays, 75 yards, 3:24.

Fourth quarter

- UTAH – Hunter Andrews 9-yard pass from Byrd Ficklin (Dillon Curtis kick), 14:36. Utes 52–14. Drive: 5 plays, 75 yards, 1:45.
- UTAH – Steve Chavez-Soto 5-yard run (Tanner Cragun kick), 9:13. Utes 59–14. Drive: 6 plays, 44 yards, 3:14.
- UTAH – LaMarcus Bell 34-yard run (Tanner Cragun kick), 1:04. Utes 66–14. Drive: 8 plays, 87 yards, 5:25.

Statistics	IDHO	UTAH
First downs	13	33
Plays–yards	61–225	75–633
Rushes–yards	31–106	49–364
Passing yards	119	269
Passing: comp–att–int	11–30–1	17–26–0
Turnovers	2	0
Time of possession	25:40	34:20

Team	Category	Player	Statistics
Idaho	Passing	Joshua Wood	9/27, 111 yards, INT
Idaho	Rushing	Joshua Wood	9 carries, 41 yards, TD
Idaho	Receiving	Noah West-Baranco	1 reception, 44 yards
Utah	Passing	Devon Dampier	13/18, 176 yards, 3 TD
Utah	Rushing	LaMarcus Bell	7 carries, 87 yards, TD
Utah	Receiving	Braden Pegan	4 receptions, 81 yards, TD

=== No. 14 Lamar ===
No. 14/17 Lamar Cardinals (1–1) at Idaho Vandals (0–2) – Game summary

Quarter	1	2	3	4	Total
No. 14 Cardinals	0	20	0	3	23
Vandals	3	0	7	7	17

at Kibbie Dome • Moscow, Idaho

- Date: September 12
- Game time: 1:00 p.m.
- Game weather: Indoor
- Game attendance: 9,015
- Referee: Mike Bezner
- TV announcers (SWX / ESPN+): Austin Getz and Adam Shackleford

Game information
First quarter
- IDHO – Owen Forsman 38-yard field goal, 5:38. Idaho 3–0. Drive: 7 plays, 12 yards, 2:21.

Second quarter

- LAM – Andres Sandoval 36-yard field goal, 14:15. Tied 3–3. Drive: 10 plays, 69 yards, 6:18.
- LAM – Andres Sandoval 48-yard field goal, 8:13. Lamar 6–3. Drive: 9 plays, 34 yards, 5:03.
- LAM – Aiden McCown 3-yard run (Andres Sandoval kick), 1:08. Lamar 13–3. Drive: 6 plays, 70 yards, 2:33.
- LAM – Davin Driskell 15-yard pass from Aiden McCown (Andres Sandoval kick), 0:01. Lamar 20–3. Drive: 4 plays, 54 yards, 0:30.

Third quarter

- IDHO – Joshua Wood 1-yard run (Owen Forsman kick), 7:28. Lamar 20–10. Drive: 11 plays, 60 yards, 5:16.

Fourth quarter

- LAM – Andres Sandoval 45-yard field goal, 10:45. Lamar 23–10. Drive: 9 plays, 41 yards, 4:03.
- IDHO – Ferrari Miller 1-yard run (Owen Forsman kick), 1:24. Lamar 23–17. Drive: 11 plays, 63 yards, 3:36.

Statistics	LAM	IDHO
First downs	15	18
Plays–yards	55–303	77–296
Rushes–yards	32–144	37–91
Passing yards	159	205
Passing: comp–att–int	13–23–0	20–40–0
Turnovers	2	1
Time of possession	28:43	31:17

Team	Category	Player	Statistics
Lamar	Passing	Aiden McCown	13/22, 159 yards, TD
Lamar	Rushing	Jojo Uga	15 carries, 105 yards
Lamar	Receiving	Davin Driskell	3 receptions, 55 yards, TD
Idaho	Passing	Joshua Wood	20/40, 205 yards
Idaho	Rushing	Joshua Wood	19 carries, 50 yards, TD
Idaho	Receiving	Lonyatta Alexander Jr.	4 receptions, 64 yards

=== Abilene Christian ===
Abilene Christian Wildcats (0–3) at Idaho Vandals (0–3) – Game summary

Quarter	1	2	3	4	Total
Wildcats	7	14	0	20	41
Vandals	7	10	7	15	39

at Kibbie Dome • Moscow, Idaho

- Date: September 19
- Game time: 1:00 p.m.
- Game weather: Indoor
- Game attendance: 6,246
- Referee: Jeff Rink
- TV announcers (SWX / ESPN+): Austin Getz and Brian Strandley

Game information
First quarter
- IDHO – Joshua Wood 1-yard run (Owen Forsman kick), 11:16. Idaho 7–0. Drive: 9 plays, 75 yards, 3:44.
- ACU – Tucker Parks 2-yard run (Brandon Perez kick), 5:16. Abilene Christian 7–7. Drive: 12 plays, 75 yards, 6:00.

Second quarter

- IDHO – Owen Forsman 38-yard field goal, 14:50. Idaho 10–7. Drive: 12 plays, 54 yards, 5:26.
- ACU – Deonte Dean 24-yard run (Brandon Perez kick), 9:11. Abilene Christian 14–10. Drive: 1 play, 24 yards, 0:07.
- IDHO – Tony Harste 47-yard pass from Joshua Wood (Owen Forsman kick), 3:41. Idaho 17–14. Drive: 5 plays, 87 yards, 1:43.
- ACU – Raydrian Baltrip 2-yard pass from Tucker Parks (Brandon Perez kick), 0:02. Abilene Christian 21–17. Drive: 11 plays, 75 yards, 3:39.

Third quarter

- IDHO – Joshua Wood 2-yard run (Owen Forsman kick), 7:20. Idaho 24–21. Drive: 11 plays, 75 yards, 5:26.

Fourth quarter

- ACU – Brandon Perez 31-yard field goal, 14:06. Tied 24–24. Drive: 15 plays, 61 yards, 8:14.
- ACU – Brandon Perez 51-yard field goal, 10:32. Abilene Christian 27–24. Drive: 4 plays, 7 yards, 2:11.
- ACU – Obi Udom 7-yard fumble recovery (Brandon Perez kick), 10:19. Abilene Christian 34–24.
- ACU – Deonte Dean 37-yard pass from Tucker Parks (Brandon Perez kick), 8:49. Abilene Christian 41–24. Drive: 1 play, 37 yards, 0:09.
- IDHO – Joshua Wood 9-yard run (Noah West-Baranco pass), 6:33. Abilene Christian 41–32. Drive: 7 plays, 75 yards, 2:16.
- IDHO – Joshua Wood 3-yard run (Owen Forsman kick), 1:46. Abilene Christian 41–39. Drive: 7 plays, 77 yards, 2:09.

Statistics	ACU	IDHO
First downs	20	28
Plays–yards	65–392	67–444
Rushes–yards	44–244	32–112
Passing yards	148	332
Passing: comp–att–int	14–21–0	23–35–0
Turnovers	0	2
Time of possession	31:41	28:19

Team	Category	Player	Statistics
Abilene Christian	Passing	Tucker Parks	14/21, 148 yards, 2 TD
Abilene Christian	Rushing	Rovaughn Banks Jr.	22 carries, 99 yards
Abilene Christian	Receiving	Deonte Dean	1 reception, 37 yards, TD
Idaho	Passing	Joshua Wood	22/34, 326 yards, TD
Idaho	Rushing	Joshua Wood	13 carries, 37 yards, 4 TD
Idaho	Receiving	Tony Harste	6 receptions, 151 yards, TD

=== No. 1 Montana State ===
No. 1 Montana State Bobcats (5–0) at Idaho Vandals (0–4) – Game summary

Quarter	1	2	3	4	Total
No. 1 Bobcats	10	14	3	7	34
Vandals	7	13	0	15	35

at Kibbie Dome • Moscow, Idaho

- Date: October 2
- Game time: 7:30 p.m.
- Game weather: Indoor
- Game attendance: 9,231
- Referee: Justin Robinson
- TV announcers (ESPN): Courtney Lyle and Rene Ingoglia

Game information
First quarter
- MTST – Myles Sansted 21-yard field goal, 11:09. Montana State 3–0. Drive: 10 plays, 62 yards, 3:44.
- IDHO – Ryan Jezioro 75-yard pass from Joshua Wood (Owen Forsman kick), 10:57. Idaho 7–3. Drive: 1 play, 75 yards, 0:12.
- MTST – Carter Dahlke 20-yard pass from Patrick Duchien (Myles Sansted kick), 5:37. Montana State 10–7. Drive: 4 plays, 58 yards, 1:46.

Second quarter

- IDHO – Owen Forsman 45-yard field goal, 13:06. Idaho 10–10. Drive: 13 plays, 48 yards, 7:31.
- IDHO – Owen Forsman 22-yard field goal, 9:50. Idaho 13–10. Drive: 5 plays, 28 yards, 1:53.
- MTST – Jared White 32-yard run (Myles Sansted kick), 7:11. Montana State 17–13. Drive: 6 plays, 65 yards, 2:39.
- IDHO – Damonte Bias 15-yard run (Owen Forsman kick), 2:22. Idaho 20–17. Drive: 9 plays, 75 yards, 4:49.
- MTST – Dane Steel 15-yard pass from Patrick Duchien (Myles Sansted kick), 1:12. Montana State 24–20. Drive: 9 plays, 75 yards, 1:10.

Third quarter

- MTST – Myles Sansted 26-yard field goal, 3:20. Montana State 27–20. Drive: 15 plays, 73 yards, 8:24.

Fourth quarter

- MTST – Patrick Duchien 2-yard run (Myles Sansted kick), 13:29. Montana State 34–20. Drive: 6 plays, 38 yards, 1:46.
- IDHO – Joshua Wood 1-yard run (Owen Forsman kick), 9:54. Idaho 27–34. Drive: 6 plays, 75 yards, 3:35.
- IDHO – Ryan Jezioro 25-yard pass from Joshua Wood (Joshua Wood rush), 0:00. Idaho 35–34. Drive: 5 plays, 80 yards, 0:49.

Statistics	MSU	IDA
First downs	29	23
Plays–yards	74–469	58–443
Rushes–yards	42–220	33–128
Passing yards	249	315
Passing: comp–att–int	23–32–0	19–25–1
Turnovers	0	1
Time of possession	31:32	28:28

Team	Category	Player	Statistics
Montana State	Passing	Patrick Duchien	23/32, 249 yards, 2 TD
Montana State	Rushing	Patrick Duchien	14 carries, 92 yards, TD
Montana State	Receiving	Carter Dahlke	10 receptions, 126 yards, TD
Idaho	Passing	Joshua Wood	19/25, 315 yards, 2 TD, INT
Idaho	Rushing	Damonte Bias	7 carries, 46 yards, TD
Idaho	Receiving	Ryan Jezioro	6 receptions, 147 yards, 2 TD

=== at Weber State ===
Idaho Vandals (1–4) at Weber State Wildcats (3–3) – Game summary

Quarter	1	2	3	4	Total
Vandals	0	7	7	13	27
Wildcats	14	0	3	21	38

at Stewart Stadium • Ogden, Utah

- Date: October 10
- Game time: 12:00 p.m.
- Game weather: Cloudy
- Game attendance: 5,785
- Referee: Spencer Mumford
- TV announcers (ESPN+): Dave Fox, Alema Harrington and Frank Dolce

Game information
First quarter
- WSU – Spencer Ferguson 75-yard run (David Dellenbach kick), 14:49. Weber State 7–0. Drive: 1 play, 75 yards, 0:11.
- WSU – Seth Rigtrup 6-yard run (David Dellenbach kick), 3:39. Weber State 14–0. Drive: 13 plays, 78 yards, 6:31.

Second quarter

- IDHO – Noah West-Baranco 19-yard pass from Joshua Wood (Owen Forsman kick), 12:36. Idaho 7–14. Drive: 11 plays, 75 yards, 6:03.

Third quarter

- WSU – David Dellenbach 25-yard field goal, 8:18. Weber State 17–7. Drive: 9 plays, 41 yards, 4:58.
- IDHO – Tony Harste 39-yard pass from Joshua Wood (Owen Forsman kick), 2:00. Idaho 14–17. Drive: 3 plays, 39 yards, 0:18.

Fourth quarter

- WSU – Noah Kjar 14-yard pass from Nate Dahle (David Dellenbach kick), 14:41. Weber State 24–14. Drive: 2 plays, 14 yards, 0:09.
- IDHO – Ryan Jezioro 13-yard pass from Joshua Wood (Owen Forsman kick), 8:15. Idaho 21–24. Drive: 12 plays, 65 yards, 6:16.
- WSU – Seth Rigtrup 16-yard run (David Dellenbach kick), 7:12. Weber State 31–21. Drive: 3 plays, 75 yards, 1:03.
- WSU – Spencer Ferguson 2-yard run (David Dellenbach kick), 2:46. Weber State 38–21. Drive: 7 plays, 42 yards, 2:53.
- IDHO – Tony Harste 14-yard pass from Joshua Wood (kick failed), 0:15. Idaho 27–38. Drive: 13 plays, 69 yards, 2:24.

Statistics	IDA	WSU
First downs	25	20
Plays–yards	86–496	55–406
Rushes–yards	34–113	36–307
Passing yards	383	99
Passing: comp–att–int	32–52–2	10–19–1
Turnovers	2	2
Time of possession	37:09	22:51

Team	Category	Player	Statistics
Idaho	Passing	Joshua Wood	32/50, 383 yards, 4 TD, 2 INT
Idaho	Rushing	Joshua Wood	13 carries, 52 yards
Idaho	Receiving	Tony Harste	6 receptions, 96 yards, 2 TD
Weber State	Passing	Nate Dahle	10/19, 99 yards, TD, INT
Weber State	Rushing	Spencer Ferguson	14 carries, 153 yards, 2 TD
Weber State	Receiving	Noah Kjar	5 receptions, 50 yards, TD

=== at No. 7 Montana (Little Brown Stein) ===
Idaho Vandals (1–5) at No. 7 Montana Grizzlies (5–2) – Game summary

Quarter	1	2	3	4	Total
Vandals	14	7	14	7	42
No. 7 Grizzlies	0	14	14	7	35

at Washington–Grizzly Stadium • Missoula, Montana

- Date: October 17
- Game time: 12:00 p.m.
- Game weather: Sunny
- Game attendance: 26,567
- Referee: Gregg Wilson
- TV: SWX / ESPN+

Game information
First quarter
- IDHO – Zack Card 10-yard pass from Joshua Wood (Owen Forsman kick), 10:05. Idaho 7–0. Drive: 7 plays, 39 yards, 3:40.
- IDHO – Ryan Jezioro 14-yard pass from Joshua Wood (Owen Forsman kick), 1:35. Idaho 14–0. Drive: 11 plays, 88 yards, 6:08.

Second quarter

- UM – Brooks Davis 18-yard pass from Keali'i Ah Yat (Jo Silver kick), 13:39. Montana 7–14. Drive: 7 plays, 75 yards, 2:56.
- IDHO – Joshua Wood 2-yard run (Owen Forsman kick), 6:21. Idaho 21–7. Drive: 14 plays, 76 yards, 7:12.
- UM – Brooks Davis 5-yard pass from Keali'i Ah Yat (Jo Silver kick), 1:05. Montana 14–21. Drive: 12 plays, 74 yards, 5:08.

Third quarter

- UM – Brooks Davis 33-yard pass from Keali'i Ah Yat (Jo Silver kick), 12:23. Montana 21–21. Drive: 5 plays, 75 yards, 2:37.
- IDHO – Ryan Jezioro 13-yard pass from Joshua Wood (Owen Forsman kick), 7:37. Idaho 28–21. Drive: 10 plays, 75 yards, 4:46.
- UM – Landon Ransom-Goelz 22-yard pass from Keali'i Ah Yat (Jo Silver kick), 5:57. Montana 28–28. Drive: 4 plays, 65 yards, 1:30.
- IDHO – Hayden Kincheloe 6-yard run (Owen Forsman kick), 0:10. Idaho 35–28. Drive: 12 plays, 73 yards, 5:41.

Fourth quarter

- UM – Eli Gillman 3-yard pass from Keali'i Ah Yat (Jo Silver kick), 11:53. Montana 35–35. Drive: 9 plays, 75 yards, 3:17.
- IDHO – Israel Carter 2-yard run (Owen Forsman kick), 10:07. Idaho 42–35. Drive: 4 plays, 75 yards, 1:46.

Statistics	UI	UM
First downs	32	24
Plays–yards	74–493	59–481
Rushes–yards	36–158	28–143
Passing yards	335	338
Passing: comp–att–int	30–38–1	25–31–0
Turnovers	1	1
Time of possession	35:43	24:17

Team	Category	Player	Statistics
Idaho	Passing	Joshua Wood	30/38, 335 yards, 3 TD, INT
Idaho	Rushing	Joshua Wood	11 carries, 85 yards, TD
Idaho	Receiving	Tony Harste	5 receptions, 61 yards
Montana	Passing	Keali'i Ah Yat	25/31, 338 yards, 5 TD
Montana	Rushing	Eli Gillman	19 carries, 139 yards
Montana	Receiving	Brooks Davis	8 receptions, 104 yards, 3 TD

=== Southern Utah ===
Southern Utah Thunderbirds (3–4) at Idaho Vandals (2–5) – Game summary

Quarter	1	2	3	4	Total
Thunderbirds	0	10	8	10	28
Vandals	3	15	3	10	31

at Kibbie Dome • Moscow, Idaho

- Date: October 24
- Game time: 2:00 p.m.
- Game weather: Indoor
- Game attendance: 10,369
- Referee: Mike Bezner
- TV announcers (SWX / ESPN+): Greg Talbott and Adam Shackleford

Game information
First quarter
- IDHO – Owen Forsman 35-yard field goal, 8:56. Idaho 3–0. Drive: 7 plays, 22 yards, 3:18.

Second quarter

- SUU – Floyd Chalk 19-yard run (Jayden Rogers kick), 9:20. Southern Utah 7–3. Drive: 6 plays, 80 yards, 3:16.
- IDHO – Markel Taylor 19-yard pass from Joshua Wood (Owen Forsman kick), 7:27. Idaho 10–7. Drive: 5 plays, 75 yards, 1:53.
- SUU – Jayden Rogers 42-yard field goal, 3:20. Southern Utah 10–10. Drive: 7 plays, 50 yards, 4:07.
- IDHO – Hayden Kincheloe 1-yard run (Gus Donnerberg pass), 1:23. Idaho 18–10. Drive: 6 plays, 75 yards, 1:57.

Third quarter

- SUU – Will Burns 76-yard run (Jack Fairchild pass), 12:04. Southern Utah 18–18. Drive: 5 plays, 86 yards, 2:42.
- IDHO – Owen Forsman 25-yard field goal, 3:09. Idaho 21–18. Drive: 8 plays, 50 yards, 2:20.

Fourth quarter

- IDHO – Gus Donnerberg 14-yard pass from Joshua Wood (Owen Forsman kick), 10:19. Idaho 28–18. Drive: 9 plays, 85 yards, 5:07.
- SUU – Jayden Rogers 32-yard field goal, 4:54. Southern Utah 21–28. Drive: 11 plays, 60 yards, 5:25.
- SUU – Mark Bails Jr. 57-yard pass from Will Burns (Jayden Rogers kick), 0:42. Southern Utah 28–28. Drive: 4 plays, 57 yards, 0:28.
- IDHO – Owen Forsman 53-yard field goal, 0:00. Idaho 31–28. Drive: 6 plays, 40 yards, 0:42.

Statistics	SUU	IDA
First downs	16	19
Plays–yards	66–450	64–378
Rushes–yards	35–245	39–227
Passing yards	205	151
Passing: comp–att–int	17–31–1	15–25–1
Turnovers	1	2
Time of possession	31:46	28:14

Team	Category	Player	Statistics
Southern Utah	Passing	Will Burns	17/31, 205 yards, TD, INT
Southern Utah	Rushing	Will Burns	18 carries, 187 yards, TD
Southern Utah	Receiving	Mark Bails Jr.	2 receptions, 69 yards, TD
Idaho	Passing	Joshua Wood	15/25, 151 yards, 2 TD, INT
Idaho	Rushing	Damonte Bias	11 carries, 89 yards
Idaho	Receiving	Zack Card	4 receptions, 57 yards

=== at Portland State ===
Idaho Vandals (3–5) at Portland State Vikings (2–6) – Game summary

Quarter	1	2	3	4	Total
Vandals	14	10	7	7	38
Vikings	7	0	0	7	14

at Hillsboro Stadium • Hillsboro, Oregon

- Date: October 31
- Game time: 1:00 p.m.
- Game weather: Cloudy
- Game attendance: 1,910
- Referee: Jim Crowley
- TV announcers (ESPN+): Matt Richert, Scott Hermo and Grace Peterson

Game information
First quarter
- IDHO – Zack Card 28-yard pass from Joshua Wood (Owen Forsman kick), 12:08. Idaho 7–0. Drive: 8 plays, 75 yards, 2:52.
- PRST – Terence Loville 4-yard pass from Gabe Downing (Joshua Hossmann Lees kick), 3:09. Tied 7–7. Drive: 5 plays, 35 yards, 2:49.
- IDHO – Damonte Bias 6-yard pass from Joshua Wood (Owen Forsman kick), 0:55. Idaho 14–7. Drive: 7 plays, 75 yards, 2:14.

Second quarter

- IDHO – Owen Forsman 47-yard field goal, 1:55. Idaho 17–7. Drive: 5 plays, 23 yards, 1:54.
- IDHO – Ryan Jezioro 77-yard pass from Joshua Wood (Owen Forsman kick), 0:44. Idaho 24–7. Drive: 1 play, 77 yards, 0:14.

Third quarter

- IDHO – Damonte Bias 4-yard run (Owen Forsman kick), 13:07. Idaho 31–7. Drive: 2 plays, 31 yards, 0:46.

Fourth quarter

- IDHO – Joshua Wood 1-yard run (Owen Forsman kick), 6:25. Idaho 38–7. Drive: 14 plays, 92 yards, 7:37.
- PRST – Terence Loville 2-yard pass from John-Keawe Sagapolutele (Joshua Hossmann Lees kick), 0:51. Idaho 38–14. Drive: 11 plays, 83 yards, 5:27.

Statistics	IDHO	PRST
First downs	19	19
Plays–yards	60–469	63–294
Rushes–yards	35–166	23–13
Passing yards	303	281
Passing: comp–att–int	16–25–1	29–40–0
Turnovers	1	0
Time of possession	29:43	30:17

Team	Category	Player	Statistics
Idaho	Passing	Joshua Wood	16/25, 303 yards, 3 TD, INT
Idaho	Rushing	Kenny Golston	8 carries, 55 yards
Idaho	Receiving	Ryan Jezioro	5 receptions, 194 yards, TD
Portland State	Passing	Gabe Downing	14/21, 140 yards, TD
Portland State	Rushing	Delon Thompson	11 carries, 39 yards
Portland State	Receiving	Terence Loville	9 receptions, 114 yards, 2 TD

=== Eastern Washington ===
Eastern Washington Eagles (2–7) at Idaho Vandals (4–5) – Game summary

Quarter	1	2	3	4	Total
Eagles	3	7	7	14	31
Vandals	14	21	10	17	62

at Kibbie Dome • Moscow, Idaho

- Date: November 7
- Game time: 2:00 p.m.
- Game weather: Indoor
- Game attendance: 10,919
- Referee: Jeff Rink
- TV announcers (SWX / ESPN+): Austin Getz and Zach Barus

Game information
First quarter
- IDHO – Joshua Wood 28-yard run (Owen Forsman kick), 9:51. Idaho 7–0. Drive: 12 plays, 85 yards, 5:03.
- EWU – Soren McKee 37-yard field goal, 4:52. Idaho 7–3. Drive: 9 plays, 55 yards, 4:53.
- IDHO – Nolan McWilliams 33-yard pass from Joshua Wood (Owen Forsman kick), 2:21. Idaho 14–3. Drive: 6 plays, 75 yards, 2:31.

Second quarter

- IDHO – Lonyatta Alexander 25-yard pass from Joshua Wood (Owen Forsman kick), 11:11. Idaho 21–3. Drive: 6 plays, 85 yards, 3:05.
- EWU – Jaxon Bell 25-yard pass from Nate Bell (Soren McKee kick), 7:44. Idaho 21–10. Drive: 7 plays, 53 yards, 3:27.
- IDHO – Joshua Wood 5-yard run (Owen Forsman kick), 2:23. Idaho 28–10. Drive: 9 plays, 79 yards, 5:14.
- IDHO – Zack Card 2-yard pass from Joshua Wood (Owen Forsman kick), 0:10. Idaho 35–10. Drive: 8 plays, 75 yards, 1:01.

Third quarter

- IDHO – Owen Forsman 39-yard field goal, 8:34. Idaho 38–10. Drive: 11 plays, 44 yards, 4:38.
- EWU – Nate Bell 6-yard run (Soren McKee kick), 3:37. Idaho 38–17. Drive: 11 plays, 78 yards, 4:50.
- IDHO – Israel Carter 2-yard run (Owen Forsman kick), 0:00. Idaho 45–17. Drive: 6 plays, 75 yards, 3:37.

Fourth quarter

- IDHO – Israel Carter 39-yard run (Owen Forsman kick), 13:08. Idaho 52–17. Drive: 4 plays, 54 yards, 1:51.
- IDHO – Israel Carter 69-yard run (Owen Forsman kick), 10:33. Idaho 59–17. Drive: 3 plays, 72 yards, 1:28.
- EWU – Jaxon Bell 6-yard pass from Jake Schakel (Soren McKee kick), 7:51. Idaho 59–24. Drive: 3 plays, 19 yards, 1:16.
- IDHO – Owen Forsman 53-yard field goal, 4:54. Idaho 62–24. Drive: 7 plays, 40 yards, 2:57.
- EWU – David Cabrera 25-yard pass from Jake Schakel (Soren McKee kick), 0:29. Idaho 62–31. Drive: 2 plays, 52 yards, 0:24.

Statistics	EWU	IDHO
First downs	20	31
Plays–yards	62–298	75–650
Rushes–yards	28–50	42–335
Passing yards	248	315
Passing: comp–att–int	23–34–1	20–33–0
Turnovers	1	1
Time of possession	26:29	33:31

Team	Category	Player	Statistics
Eastern Washington	Passing	Nate Bell	17/24, 174 yards, TD
Eastern Washington	Rushing	Jaxon Bell	6 carries, 22 yards
Eastern Washington	Receiving	Jaxon Bell	3 receptions, 42 yards, 2 TD
Idaho	Passing	Joshua Wood	20/29, 315 yards, 3 TD
Idaho	Rushing	Israel Carter	7 carries, 164 yards, 3 TD
Idaho	Receiving	Nolan McWilliams	4 receptions, 86 yards, TD

=== No. 23 UC Davis ===
No. 23 UC Davis Aggies (6–4) at Idaho Vandals (5–5) – Game summary

Quarter	1	2	3	4	Total
No. 23 Aggies	0	0	0	0	0
Vandals	0	0	0	0	0

at Kibbie Dome • Moscow, Idaho

- Date: November 14
- Game time: 1:00 p.m.
- TV announcers (SWX / ESPN+): Austin Getz and Adam Shackleford

Game information

First quarter
Second quarter
Third quarter
Fourth quarter

Statistics	UCD	IDHO
First downs		
Plays–yards		
Rushes–yards		
Passing yards		
Passing: comp–att–int		
Turnovers		
Time of possession		

Team	Category	Player	Statistics
UC Davis	Passing		
UC Davis	Rushing		
UC Davis	Receiving		
Idaho	Passing		
Idaho	Rushing		
Idaho	Receiving		

=== at No. 25 Idaho State (rivalry) ===
Idaho Vandals (5–6) at No. 25 Idaho State Bengals (6–5) – Game summary

Quarter	1	2	3	4	Total
Vandals	0	0	0	0	0
No. 25 Bengals	0	0	0	0	0

at ICCU Dome • Pocatello, Idaho

- Date: November 21
- Game time: 3:00 p.m.
- TV: ESPN+

Game information

First quarter
Second quarter
Third quarter
Fourth quarter

Statistics	IDHO	IDST
First downs		
Plays–yards		
Rushes–yards		
Passing yards		
Passing: comp–att–int		
Turnovers		
Time of possession		

Team	Category	Player	Statistics
Idaho	Passing		
Idaho	Rushing		
Idaho	Receiving		
Idaho State	Passing		
Idaho State	Rushing		
Idaho State	Receiving		

== Rankings ==
Ranking movements Legend: ██ Increase in ranking ██ Decrease in ranking — = Not ranked RV = Received votes
	Week														
Poll	Pre	1	2	3	4	5	6	7	8	9	10	11	12	13	Final
STATS	—	—	—	—	—	—	—	—	—	—	—				
Coaches	—	RV	—	—	—	—	—	—	—	—	—				

== Personnel ==
=== Coaching staff ===
Name	Position
Thomas Ford Jr.	Head coach
Ian Shoemaker	Offensive coordinator / quarterbacks
Lee Stalker	Defensive coordinator / linebackers
Joe Begnal	Special teams coordinator
Loren Endsley	Run game coordinator / offensive line
Sheldon Cross	Recruiting coordinator / tight ends
Spencer Treadwell	Running backs
Treston Decoud	Cornerbacks
Tyler Paopao	Wide receivers
VJ Malo	Defensive line
Avery Roberts	Edge rushers
Dom Anderson	Pass game coordinator / defensive backs

== Statistics ==
=== Scoring ===
Through ten games, Idaho has outscored Big Sky Conference opponents 269–218 while being outscored 130–70 by non-conference opponents.

==== Idaho vs. non-conference opponents ====
	1	2	3	4	Total
Opponents	24	48	14	44	130
Idaho	10	17	21	22	70

==== Idaho vs. Big Sky opponents ====
	1	2	3	4	Total
Opponents	41	59	35	83	218
Idaho	55	80	47	87	269

==== Idaho vs. all opponents ====
	1	2	3	4	Total
Opponents	65	107	49	127	348
Idaho	65	97	68	109	339
