= 2026 Eastern Washington Eagles football team =

American college football season

2026 Eastern Washington Eagles football
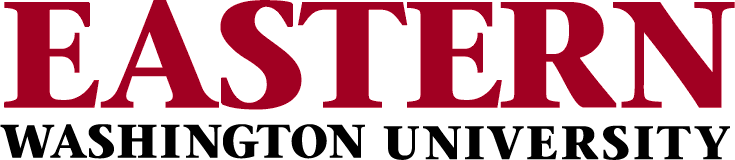
- Conference: Big Sky Conference
- Record: 3–9 (2–7 Big Sky)
- Head coach: Aaron Best (10th season)
- Offensive coordinator: Marc Anderson (2nd season)
- Defensive coordinator: Zach Bruce (1st season)
- Co-defensive coordinator: Caleb Padilla (1st season)
- Home stadium: Roos Field

2026 Big Sky Conference football standings
	Conf.			Overall
Team	W		L	W		L
No. 2 Montana State $^	8	–	1	11	–	1
No. 15 Weber State	7	–	2	8	–	4
No. 12 Northern Arizona	7	–	2	9	–	3
No. 8 Montana	6	–	3	8	–	4
No. 23 UC Davis	6	–	3	8	–	4
Idaho	5	–	4	5	–	7
Southern Utah	4	–	4	6	–	6
No. 25 Idaho State	4	–	5	7	–	5
Cal Poly	3	–	6	4	–	8
Portland State	3	–	6	3	–	9
Eastern Washington	2	–	7	3	–	9
Northern Colorado	2	–	7	3	–	9
Utah Tech	1	–	8	1	–	11
$ – Conference champion; ^ – FCS playoff participant; As of November 22, 2026; Rankings from STATS Poll

The 2026 Eastern Washington Eagles football team will represent Eastern Washington University as a member of the Big Sky Conference during the 2026 NCAA Division I FCS football season. The Eagles will be led by tenth-year head coach Aaron Best and will play their home games at the Roos Field in Cheney, Washington.

== Schedule ==
Date	Time	Opponent	Site	TV	Result	Attendance
August 29	2:00 p.m.	at No. 25 Northern Arizona	Walkup Skydome; Flagstaff, AZ	ESPN+	L 27–34	8,224
September 5	4:00 p.m.	Northern Iowa*	Roos Field; Cheney, WA	SWX/ESPN+	W 34–24	4,389
September 12	11:00 a.m.	at No. 11 South Dakota*	DakotaDome; Vermillion, SD	ESPN+	L 23–41	7,535
September 19	4:15 p.m.	at Washington*	Husky Stadium; Seattle, WA	BTN	L 16–48	61,619
September 26	4:00 p.m.	Cal Poly	Roos Field; Cheney, WA	SWX/ESPN+	L 27–31	5,320
October 3	7:30 p.m.	at No. 16 UC Davis	UC Davis Health Stadium; Davis, CA	ESPN2	L 38–49	8,677
October 10	4:00 p.m.	Northern Colorado^{†}	Roos Field; Cheney, WA	SWX/ESPN+	W 31–22	4,990
October 17	4:00 p.m.	No. 5 Montana State	Roos Field; Cheney, WA	SWX/ESPN+	L 20–56	5,318
October 31	1:00 p.m.	No. 14 Montana	Roos Field; Cheney, WA (EWU–UM Governors Cup)	SWX/ESPN+	L 33–42	4,900
November 7	2:00 p.m.	at Idaho	Kibbie Dome; Moscow, ID	SWX/ESPN+	L 31–62	10,919
November 14	6:00 p.m.	at Utah Tech	Greater Zion Stadium; St. George, UT	ESPN+	W 31–28	4,447
November 21	1:00 p.m.	Portland State	Roos Field; Cheney, WA (The Dam Cup)	SWX/ESPN+	L 38–40	3,742
*Non-conference game; ^{†}Homecoming; Rankings from STATS Poll released prior to the game; All times are in Pacific time

== Game summaries ==
=== at No. 25 Northern Arizona ===
Eastern Washington Eagles (0–0) at No. 25 Northern Arizona Lumberjacks (0–0) – Game summary

Quarter	1	2	3	4	Total
Eagles	10	14	0	3	27
No. 25 Lumberjacks	3	14	3	14	34

at Walkup Skydome • Flagstaff, Arizona

- Date: August 29
- Game time: 2:00 p.m.
- Game weather: none (played indoors)
- Game attendance: 8,224
- Referee: Jeff Rink
- TV announcers (ESPN+): James Malamas, Kevin Stephens and Adriana Sparks

Game information

First quarter

- EWU – Wesley Garrett 3-yard pass from Nate Bell (Soren McKee kick), 10:22. Eagles 7–0. Drive: 3 plays, 6 yards, 1:31.
- NAU – Francisco Orduno Jr. 24-yard field goal, 5:47. Eagles 7–3. Drive: 7 plays, 14 yards, 3:04.
- EWU – Soren McKee 53-yard field goal, 1:28. Eagles 10–3. Drive: 12 plays, 39 yards, 4:19.

Second quarter

- EWU – Nate Bell 12-yard run (Soren McKee kick), 6:13. Eagles 17–3. Drive: 9 plays, 86 yards, 3:20.
- EWU – Jaxon Branch 14-yard pass from Nate Bell (Soren McKee kick), 2:57. Eagles 24–3. Drive: 4 plays, 27 yards, 1:59.
- NAU – Lindsey Graves 100-yard kickoff return (Francisco Orduno Jr. kick), 2:44. Eagles 24–10.
- NAU – Quran Gossett 2-yard run (Francisco Orduno Jr. kick), 0:23. Eagles 24–17. Drive: 6 plays, 33 yards, 1:27.

Third quarter

- NAU – Francisco Orduno Jr. 25-yard field goal, 7:08. Eagles 24–20. Drive: 14 plays, 67 yards, 7:52.

Fourth quarter

- NAU – Jeter Purdy 30-yard pass from Ty Pennington (Francisco Orduno Jr. kick), 13:35. Lumberjacks 27–24. Drive: 9 plays, 83 yards, 4:32.
- EWU – Soren McKee 37-yard field goal, 10:03. Tied 27–27. Drive: 8 plays, 55 yards, 2:43.
- NAU – Nassim Isaac 2-yard pass from Ty Pennington (Francisco Orduno Jr. kick), 3:54. Lumberjacks 34–27. Drive: 11 plays, 75 yards, 6:09.

Statistics	EWU	NAU
First downs	26	22
Plays–yards	77–429	67–365
Rushes–yards	30–122	40–201
Passing yards	307	164
Passing: comp–att–int	30–47–1	15–27–1
Turnovers	2	1
Time of possession	28:05	31:55

Team	Category	Player	Statistics
Eastern Washington	Passing	Nate Bell	30/47, 307 yards, 2 TD, INT
Eastern Washington	Rushing	Kevin Allen III	8 carries, 47 yards
Eastern Washington	Receiving	Jaxon Branch	7 receptions, 88 yards, TD
Northern Arizona	Passing	Ty Pennington	15/27, 164 yards, 2 TD, INT
Northern Arizona	Rushing	Quran Gossett	21 carries, 103 yards, TD
Northern Arizona	Receiving	Jeter Purdy	7 receptions, 105 yards, TD

=== Northern Iowa ===
Northern Iowa Panthers (0–0) at Eastern Washington Eagles (0–1) – Game summary

Quarter	1	2	3	4	Total
Panthers	10	14	0	0	24
Eagles	13	7	7	7	34

at Roos Field • Cheney, Washington

- Date: September 5
- Game time: 4:00 p.m.
- Game weather: Cloudy • Temperature: 69 °F (21 °C)
- Game attendance: 4,389
- Referee: Robert Quello
- TV announcers (ESPN+): Austin Getz and Bill Ames

Game information

First quarter

- EWU – Nate Bell 34-yard run (Soren McKee PAT blocked), 11:50. Eagles 7–0. Drive: 9 plays, 79 yards, 3:07.
- UNI – Jaxon Dailey 4-yard run (Max Bartachek kick), 10:07. Panthers 7–6. Drive: 4 plays, 72 yards, 1:38.
- EWU – Jaxon Branch 16-yard pass from Nate Bell (Soren McKee kick), 7:50. Eagles 13–7. Drive: 3 plays, 6 yards, 1:31.
- UNI – Max Bartachek 25-yard field goal, 3:00. Eagles 13–10. Drive: 11 plays, 67 yards, 4:50.

Second quarter

- UNI – Jaxon Dailey 1-yard run (Max Bartachek kick), 10:45. Panthers 17–13. Drive: 11 plays, 59 yards, 6:22.
- EWU – Nate Bell 2-yard run (Soren McKee kick), 4:26. Eagles 20–17. Drive: 15 plays, 75 yards, 6:19.
- UNI – Jaxon Dailey 9-yard run (Max Bartachek kick), 0:27. Panthers 24–20. Drive: 8 plays, 75 yards, 3:59.

Third quarter

- EWU – Nate Bell 2-yard run (Soren McKee kick), 1:32. Eagles 27–24. Drive: 16 plays, 84 yards, 6:36.

Fourth quarter

- EWU – Jamai East 15-yard pass from Nate Bell (Soren McKee kick), 3:16. Eagles 34–24. Drive: 12 plays, 80 yards, 5:37.

Statistics	UNI	EWU
First downs	23	27
Plays–yards	63–350	73–395
Rushes–yards	35–63	40–138
Passing yards	287	257
Passing: comp–att–int	20–28–1	24–33–0
Turnovers	1	0
Time of possession	30:41	29:19

Team	Category	Player	Statistics
Northern Iowa	Passing	Jaxon Dailey	20/28, 287 yards, INT
Northern Iowa	Rushing	Taj Hughes	3 carries, 23 yards
Northern Iowa	Receiving	Tay Norman	4 receptions, 61 yards
Eastern Washington	Passing	Nate Bell	24/33, 257 yards, 2 TD
Eastern Washington	Rushing	Nate Bell	18 carries, 94 yards, 3 TD
Eastern Washington	Receiving	Wesley Garrett	4 receptions, 70 yards

=== at No. 11 South Dakota ===
Eastern Washington Eagles (1–1) at No. 11 South Dakota Coyotes (2–0) – Game summary

Quarter	1	2	3	4	Total
Eagles	0	3	7	13	23
No. 11 Coyotes	7	10	14	10	41

at DakotaDome • Vermillion, South Dakota

- Date: September 12, 2026
- Game time: 1:00 p.m.
- Game weather: Indoors • Temperature: 70 °F (21 °C)
- Game attendance: 7,535
- Referee: Carl Chapman
- TV announcers (ESPN+): Jay Elsen and Andre Fields

Game information

First quarter

- SDAK – Brayden White 8-yard pass from Austyn Modrzewski (Bohdie Ing kick), 6:11. Coyotes 7–0. Drive: 11 plays, 83 yards, 5:31.

Second quarter

- SDAK – Bohdie Ing 31-yard field goal, 11:24. Coyotes 10–0. Drive: 13 plays, 69 yards, 7:44.
- EWU – Soren McKee 40-yard field goal, 0:45. Coyotes 10–3. Drive: 7 plays, 32 yards, 0:51.
- SDAK – Tennel Bryant 66-yard pass from Austyn Modrzewski (Bohdie Ing kick), 0:26. Coyotes 17–3. Drive: 3 plays, 66 yards, 0:15.

Third quarter

- SDAK – Charles Pierre Jr. 72-yard run (Bohdie Ing kick), 13:15. Coyotes 24–3. Drive: 5 plays, 85 yards, 1:39.
- SDAK – Tennel Bryant 48-yard pass from Austyn Modrzewski (Bohdie Ing kick), 10:32. Coyotes 31–3. Drive: 2 plays, 60 yards, 0:50.
- EWU – Kayden Stuit 11-yard pass from Nate Bell (Soren McKee kick), 1:16. Coyotes 31–10. Drive: 9 plays, 91 yards, 3:13.

Fourth quarter

- SDAK – Charles Pierre Jr. 1-yard run (Bohdie Ing kick), 13:24. Coyotes 38–10. Drive: 5 plays, 4 yards, 2:38.
- EWU – Wesley Garrett 11-yard pass from Nate Bell (Soren McKee kick), 10:27. Coyotes 38–17. Drive: 10 plays, 63 yards, 2:50.
- SDAK – Bohdie Ing 36-yard field goal, 5:11. Coyotes 41–17. Drive: 9 plays, 57 yards, 9:16.
- EWU – Malik Dotson 2-yard run (pass failed), 1:55. Coyotes 41–23. Drive: 10 plays, 68 yards, 3:09.

Statistics	EWU	SDAK
First downs	19	23
Plays–yards	69–342	67–517
Rushes–yards	33–125	42–272
Passing yards	217	245
Passing: comp–att–int	20–36–1	16–25–1
Turnovers	2	1
Time of possession	24:05	35:55

Team	Category	Player	Statistics
Eastern Washington	Passing	Nate Bell	20/36, 217 yards, 2 TD, INT
Eastern Washington	Rushing	Malik Dotson	12 carries, 52 yards, TD
Eastern Washington	Receiving	Wesley Garrett	7 receptions, 109 yards, TD
South Dakota	Passing	Austyn Modrzewski	16/24, 245 yards, 3 TD, INT
South Dakota	Rushing	Charles Pierre Jr.	15 carries, 138 yards, 2 TD
South Dakota	Receiving	Tennel Bryant	3 receptions, 120 yards, 2 TD

=== at Washington (FBS) ===
Eastern Washington Eagles (1–2) at Washington Huskies (2–0) – Game summary

Quarter	1	2	3	4	Total
Eagles	3	7	3	3	16
Huskies (FBS)	14	17	7	10	48

at Husky Stadium • Seattle, Washington

- Date: September 19
- Game time: 4:15 p.m.
- Game weather: Sunny • Temperature: 65 °F (18 °C) • Wind: SE at 2 miles per hour (3.2 km/h)
- Game attendance: 61,619
- Referee: Chris Coyte
- TV announcers (BTN): A.J. Kanell, Marcel Reece, and Alyssa Charlton-Smith

Game information

First quarter

- (10:50) WASH - Chris Lawson 15-yard pass from Demond Williams Jr. (Tyler Robles kick), (Drive: 8 plays, 74 yards, 4:06; Washington 7-0)
- (5:56) EWU - Soren McKee 20-yard field goal (Drive: 9 plays, 43 yards, 4:54; Washington 7-3)
- (0:45) WASH - Rashid Williams 5-yard pass from Demond Williams Jr. (Tyler Robles kick), (Drive: 10 plays, 73 yards, 5:06; Washington 14-3)

Second quarter

- (13:47) EWU - Nate Bell 14-yard run (Soren McKee kick), (Drive: 5 plays, 83 yards, 1:53; Washington 14-10)
- (7:47) WASH - Jordan Clay 78-yard pass from Demond Williams Jr. (Tyler Robles kick), (Drive: 3 plays, 45 yards, 1:22; Washington 21-10)
- (3:30) WASH - Rashid Williams 18-yard pass from Demond Williams Jr. (Tyler Robles kick), (Drive: 7 plays, 50 yards, 3:22; Washington 28-10)
- (0:08) WASH - Tyler Robles 25-yard field goal (Drive: 8 plays, 72 yards, 0:59; Washington 31-10)

Third quarter

- (10:44) EWU - Soren McKee 37-yard field goal (Drive: 10 plays, 55 yards, 4:16; Washington 31-13)
- (3:08) WASH - Ansu Sanoe 1-yard run (Tyler Robles kick), (Drive: 5 plays, 93 yards, 2:23; Washington 38-13)

Fourth quarter

- (10:44) EWU - Soren McKee 43-yard field goal (Drive: 13 plays, 49 yards, 5:01; Washington 38-16)
- (6:28) WASH - Tyler Robles 32-yard field goal (Drive: 5 plays, 16 yards, 2:38; Washington 41-16)
- (1:50) WASH - Trez Davis 1-yard run (Tyler Robles kick), (Drive: 6 plays, 32 yards, 2:42; Washington 48-16)

Statistics	EWU	WASH
First downs	22	23
Plays–yards	75–315	62–546
Rushes–yards	46–142	26–148
Passing yards	173	398
Passing: comp–att–int	15–29–0	29–36–1
Turnovers	1	1
Time of possession	30:13	29:47

Team	Category	Player	Statistics
Eastern Washington	Passing	Nate Bell	13/24, 150 yards
Eastern Washington	Rushing	Nate Bell	17 carries, 50 yards, TD
Eastern Washington	Receiving	Rylin Lang	3 receptions, 56 yards
Washington	Passing	Demond Williams Jr.	27/33, 373 yards, 4 TD, INT
Washington	Rushing	Brian Bonner	6 carries, 81 yards
Washington	Receiving	Dezmen Roebuck	9 receptions, 121 yards

=== Cal Poly ===
Cal Poly Mustangs (2–2) at Eastern Washington Eagles (1–3) – Game summary

Quarter	1	2	3	4	Total
Mustangs	0	0	0	0	0
Eagles	0	0	0	0	0

at Roos Field • Cheney, Washington

- Date: September 26
- Game time: 4:00 p.m.
- TV: ESPN+

Game information

First quarter
Second quarter
Third quarter
Fourth quarter

Statistics	CP	EWU
First downs		
Plays–yards		
Rushes–yards		
Passing yards		
Passing: comp–att–int		
Turnovers		
Time of possession		

Team	Category	Player	Statistics
Cal Poly	Passing		
Cal Poly	Rushing		
Cal Poly	Receiving		
Eastern Washington	Passing		
Eastern Washington	Rushing		
Eastern Washington	Receiving		

=== at No. 16 UC Davis ===
Eastern Washington Eagles (1–4) at No. 16 UC Davis Aggies (3–2) – Game summary

Quarter	1	2	3	4	Total
Eagles	0	0	0	0	0
No. 16 Aggies	0	0	0	0	0

at UC Davis Health Stadium • Davis, California

- Date: October 3
- Game time: 7:30 p.m.

Game information

First quarter
Second quarter
Third quarter
Fourth quarter

Statistics	EWU	UCD
First downs		
Plays–yards		
Rushes–yards		
Passing yards		
Passing: comp–att–int		
Turnovers		
Time of possession		

Team	Category	Player	Statistics
Eastern Washington	Passing		
Eastern Washington	Rushing		
Eastern Washington	Receiving		
UC Davis	Passing		
UC Davis	Rushing		
UC Davis	Receiving		

=== Northern Colorado ===
Northern Colorado Bears (2–4) at Eastern Washington Eagles (1–5) – Game summary

Quarter	1	2	3	4	Total
Bears	0	0	0	0	0
Eagles	0	0	0	0	0

at Roos Field • Cheney, Washington

- Date: October 10
- Game time: 4:00 p.m.

Game information

First quarter
Second quarter
Third quarter
Fourth quarter

Statistics	UNCO	EWU
First downs		
Plays–yards		
Rushes–yards		
Passing yards		
Passing: comp–att–int		
Turnovers		
Time of possession		

Team	Category	Player	Statistics
Northern Colorado	Passing		
Northern Colorado	Rushing		
Northern Colorado	Receiving		
Eastern Washington	Passing		
Eastern Washington	Rushing		
Eastern Washington	Receiving		

=== No. 5 Montana State ===
No. 5 Montana State Bobcats (5–1) at Eastern Washington Eagles (2–5) – Game summary

Quarter	1	2	3	4	Total
No. 5 Bobcats	0	0	0	0	0
Eagles	0	0	0	0	0

at Roos Field • Cheney, Washington

- Date: October 17
- Game time: 4:00 p.m.

Game information

First quarter
Second quarter
Third quarter
Fourth quarter

Statistics	MTST	EWU
First downs		
Plays–yards		
Rushes–yards		
Passing yards		
Passing: comp–att–int		
Turnovers		
Time of possession		

Team	Category	Player	Statistics
Montana State	Passing		
Montana State	Rushing		
Montana State	Receiving		
Eastern Washington	Passing		
Eastern Washington	Rushing		
Eastern Washington	Receiving		

=== No. 14 Montana (EWU–UM Governors Cup) ===
No. 14 Montana Grizzlies (5–3) at Eastern Washington Eagles (2–6) – Game summary

Quarter	1	2	3	4	Total
No. 14 Grizzlies	0	0	0	0	0
Eagles	0	0	0	0	0

at Roos Field • Cheney, Washington

- Date: October 31
- Game time: 4:00 p.m.

Game information

First quarter
Second quarter
Third quarter
Fourth quarter

Statistics	MONT	EWU
First downs		
Plays–yards		
Rushes–yards		
Passing yards		
Passing: comp–att–int		
Turnovers		
Time of possession		

Team	Category	Player	Statistics
Montana	Passing		
Montana	Rushing		
Montana	Receiving		
Eastern Washington	Passing		
Eastern Washington	Rushing		
Eastern Washington	Receiving		

=== at Idaho ===
Eastern Washington Eagles (2–7) at Idaho Vandals (4–5) – Game summary

Quarter	1	2	3	4	Total
Eagles	3	7	7	14	31
Vandals	14	21	10	17	62

at Kibbie Dome • Moscow, Idaho

- Date: November 7
- Game time: 2:00 p.m.
- Game weather: Indoor
- Game attendance: 10,919
- Referee: Jeff Rink
- TV announcers (SWX/ESPN+): Austin Getz (play-by-play) and Zach Barus (analyst)

Game information

First quarter

- IDHO – Joshua Wood 28-yard run (Owen Forsman kick), 9:51. Idaho 7–0. Drive: 12 plays, 85 yards, 5:03.
- EWU – Soren McKee 37-yard field goal, 4:52. Idaho 7–3. Drive: 9 plays, 55 yards, 4:53.
- IDHO – Nolan McWilliams 33-yard pass from Joshua Wood (Owen Forsman kick), 2:21. Idaho 14–3. Drive: 6 plays, 75 yards, 2:31.

Second quarter

- IDHO – Lonyatta Alexander 25-yard pass from Joshua Wood (Owen Forsman kick), 11:11. Idaho 21–3. Drive: 6 plays, 85 yards, 3:05.
- EWU – Jaxon Bell 25-yard pass from Nate Bell (Soren McKee kick), 7:44. Idaho 21–10. Drive: 7 plays, 53 yards, 3:27.
- IDHO – Joshua Wood 5-yard run (Owen Forsman kick), 2:23. Idaho 28–10. Drive: 9 plays, 79 yards, 5:14.
- IDHO – Zack Card 2-yard pass from Joshua Wood (Owen Forsman kick), 0:10. Idaho 35–10. Drive: 8 plays, 75 yards, 1:01.

Third quarter

- IDHO – Owen Forsman 39-yard field goal, 8:34. Idaho 38–10. Drive: 11 plays, 44 yards, 4:38.
- EWU – Nate Bell 6-yard run (Soren McKee kick), 3:37. Idaho 38–17. Drive: 11 plays, 78 yards, 4:50.
- IDHO – Israel Carter 2-yard run (Owen Forsman kick), 0:00. Idaho 45–17. Drive: 6 plays, 75 yards, 3:37.

Fourth quarter

- IDHO – Israel Carter 39-yard run (Owen Forsman kick), 13:08. Idaho 52–17. Drive: 4 plays, 54 yards, 1:51.
- IDHO – Israel Carter 69-yard run (Owen Forsman kick), 10:33. Idaho 59–17. Drive: 3 plays, 72 yards, 1:28.
- EWU – Jaxon Bell 6-yard pass from Jake Schakel (Soren McKee kick), 7:51. Idaho 59–24. Drive: 3 plays, 19 yards, 1:16.
- IDHO – Owen Forsman 53-yard field goal, 4:54. Idaho 62–24. Drive: 7 plays, 40 yards, 2:57.
- EWU – David Cabrera 25-yard pass from Jake Schakel (Soren McKee kick), 0:29. Idaho 62–31. Drive: 2 plays, 52 yards, 0:24.

Statistics	EWU	IDHO
First downs	20	31
Plays–yards	62–298	75–650
Rushes–yards	28–50	42–335
Passing yards	248	315
Passing: comp–att–int	23–34–1	20–33–0
Turnovers	1	1
Time of possession	26:29	33:31

Team	Category	Player	Statistics
Eastern Washington	Passing	Nate Bell	17/24, 174 yards, TD
Eastern Washington	Rushing	Jaxon Bell	6 carries, 22 yards
Eastern Washington	Receiving	Jaxon Bell	3 receptions, 42 yards, 2 TD
Idaho	Passing	Joshua Wood	20/29, 315 yards, 3 TD
Idaho	Rushing	Israel Carter	7 carries, 164 yards, 3 TD
Idaho	Receiving	Nolan McWilliams	4 receptions, 86 yards, TD

=== at Utah Tech ===
Eastern Washington Eagles (2–8) at Utah Tech Trailblazers (1–9) – Game summary

Quarter	1	2	3	4	Total
Eagles	0	0	0	0	0
Trailblazers	0	0	0	0	0

at Greater Zion Stadium • St. George, Utah

- Date: November 14
- Game time: 1:00 p.m.

Game information

First quarter
Second quarter
Third quarter
Fourth quarter

Statistics	EWU	UTU
First downs		
Plays–yards		
Rushes–yards		
Passing yards		
Passing: comp–att–int		
Turnovers		
Time of possession		

Team	Category	Player	Statistics
Eastern Washington	Passing		
Eastern Washington	Rushing		
Eastern Washington	Receiving		
Utah Tech	Passing		
Utah Tech	Rushing		
Utah Tech	Receiving		

=== Portland State (The Dam Cup) ===
Portland State Vikings (2–9) at Eastern Washington Eagles (3–8) – Game summary

Quarter	1	2	3	4	Total
Vikings	0	0	0	0	0
Eagles	0	0	0	0	0

at Roos Field • Cheney, Washington

- Date: November 21
- Game time: 1:00 p.m.

Game information

First quarter
Second quarter
Third quarter
Fourth quarter

Statistics	PRST	EWU
First downs		
Plays–yards		
Rushes–yards		
Passing yards		
Passing: comp–att–int		
Turnovers		
Time of possession		

Team	Category	Player	Statistics
Portland State	Passing		
Portland State	Rushing		
Portland State	Receiving		
Eastern Washington	Passing		
Eastern Washington	Rushing		
Eastern Washington	Receiving		

== Rankings ==
Ranking movements Legend: ██ Increase in ranking ██ Decrease in ranking — = Not ranked RV = Received votes
	Week														
Poll	Pre	1	2	3	4	5	6	7	8	9	10	11	12	13	Final
STATS	—	—	—												
Coaches	—	—	RV												
