= 2026 UC Davis Aggies football team =

American college football season

2026 UC Davis Aggies football
- Conference: Big Sky Conference

Ranking
- STATS: No. 23
- FCS Coaches: No. 23
- Record: 8–4 (6–3 Big Sky)
- Head coach: Tim Plough (3rd season)
- Offensive coordinator: Paul Shelton (3rd season)
- Defensive coordinator: Matt Coombs (7th season)
- Home stadium: UC Davis Health Stadium

2026 Big Sky Conference football standings
	Conf.			Overall
Team	W		L	W		L
No. 2 Montana State $^	8	–	1	11	–	1
No. 15 Weber State	7	–	2	8	–	4
No. 12 Northern Arizona	7	–	2	9	–	3
No. 8 Montana	6	–	3	8	–	4
No. 23 UC Davis	6	–	3	8	–	4
Idaho	5	–	4	5	–	7
Southern Utah	4	–	4	6	–	6
No. 25 Idaho State	4	–	5	7	–	5
Cal Poly	3	–	6	4	–	8
Portland State	3	–	6	3	–	9
Eastern Washington	2	–	7	3	–	9
Northern Colorado	2	–	7	3	–	9
Utah Tech	1	–	8	1	–	11
$ – Conference champion; ^ – FCS playoff participant; As of November 22, 2026; Rankings from STATS Poll

The 2026 UC Davis Aggies football team will represent the University of California, Davis during the 2026 NCAA Division I FCS football season as a member of the Big Sky Conference. They will be led by third-year head coach Tim Plough and will play their home games at UC Davis Health Stadium in Davis, California. It will be the Aggies' 108th season overall, and 15th in the Big Sky.

== Preseason ==
=== Polls ===
On July 20th, 2026, during the Big Sky Kickoff, the Aggies were predicted to finish third in both the Big Sky coaches and media polls.

== Personnel ==
=== Transfers ===
==== Outgoing ====
Outgoing Transfers
Name	Pos.	Height	Weight	Hometown	New school
Carter Vargas	RB	5'11"	190 lbs	Santa Maria, CA	California
Caden Pinnick	QB	6' 0"	186 lbs	Loomis, CA	Washington State
Lamont Shamburger	S	6'0"	180 lbs	Gardena, CA	Unknown
Cade Cox	P	6' 0"	175 lbs	Redding, CA	Eastern Illinois

==== Incoming ====
Incoming Transfers
Name	Pos.	Height	Weight	Hometown	Prev. school
Jacob Houseworth	TE	6'3"	225 lbs	Fortuna, CA	California
Hayden John	ATH	6'2"	190 lbs	Anacortes, WA	Idaho
Jackson Kollock	QB	6'4"	225 lbs	Laguna Beach, CA	Minnesota
Robert Meyer	K	6'3"	180 lbs	Colfax, CA	Missouri
Chauncey Sylvester	RB	5'10"	195 lbs	Bellflower, CA	Weber State

== Schedule ==
Date	Time	Opponent	Rank	Site	TV	Result	Attendance
August 29	12:00 pm	at Portland State	No. 6	Hillsboro Stadium; Hillsboro, OR	ESPN+	W 31–24	2,367
September 5	7:00 pm	at San Diego*	No. 7	Torero Stadium; San Diego, CA	ESPN+	W 49–17	4,573
September 12	1:00 pm	at No. 17 (FBS) SMU*	No. 7	Gerald J. Ford Stadium; Dallas, TX	ACCNX/ESPN+	L 10–56	29,054
September 19	7:00 pm	Stetson*	No. 11	UC Davis Health Stadium; Davis, CA	ESPN+/KMAX	W 45–7	15,270
September 26	7:00 pm	No. 5 Montana	No. 10	UC Davis Health Stadium; Davis, CA	ESPN+/KMAX	L 22–62	11,238
October 3	7:30 pm	Eastern Washington^{†}	No. 16	UC Davis Health Stadium; Davis, CA	ESPN2	W 49–38	8,677
October 17	5:00 pm	at Southern Utah	No. 14	Eccles Coliseum; Cedar City, UT	ESPN+	L 17–38	3,136
October 24	4:00 pm	Northern Colorado	No. 20	UC Davis Health Stadium; Davis, CA	ESPN+/KMAX	W 33–6	7,841
October 31	12:00 pm	at No. 22 Weber State	No. 20	Stewart Stadium; Ogden, UT	ESPN+	L 14–38	5,975
November 7	4:00 pm	Utah Tech		UC Davis Health Stadium; Davis, CA	ESPN+/KMAX	W 24–17	10,011
November 14	1:00 pm	at Idaho	No. 23	P1FCU Kibbie Dome; Moscow, ID	ESPN+	W 28–24	7,254
November 21	5:00 pm	Cal Poly	No. 23	UC Davis Health Stadium; Davis, CA (Battle for the Golden Horseshoe)	ESPN+/KMAX	W 44–43	9,274
*Non-conference game; ^{†}Homecoming; Rankings from STATS - Released prior to game; All times are in Pacific time

== Game summaries ==
=== at Portland State ===
No. 6 UC Davis Aggies (0–0) at Portland State Vikings (0–0) – Game summary

Quarter	1	2	3	4	Total
No. 6 Aggies	0	0	16	15	31
Vikings	14	7	0	3	24

at Hillsboro Stadium • Hillsboro, Oregon

- Date: August 29
- Game time: 12:00 p.m.
- Game weather: Sunny
- Game attendance: 2,367
- Referee: Mike Bezner
- TV announcers (ESPN+): Matt Richert, Scott Hermo and Grace Peterson

Game information

First quarter

- PRST – Tyrese Smith 1-yard run (Joshua Hossmann Lees kick), 0:59. Vikings 7–0. Drive: 9 plays, 70 yards, 5:15.
- PRST – Cru Newman 78-yard punt return (Joshua Hossmann Lees kick), 0:00. Vikings 14–0.

Second quarter

- PRST – Tyrese Smith 1-yard run (Joshua Hossmann Lees kick), 0:08. Vikings 21–0. Drive: 16 plays, 87 yards, 5:06.

Third quarter

- UCD – Team safety, 9:42. Vikings 21–2.
- UCD – Jordan Fisher 1-yard run (Robert Meyer kick), 6:01. Vikings 21–9. Drive: 7 plays, 60 yards, 3:28.
- UCD – Jordan Fisher 4-yard run (Robert Meyer kick), 0:06. Vikings 21–16. Drive: 6 plays, 50 yards, 2:23.

Fourth quarter

- PRST – Joshua Hossmann Lees 24-yard field goal, 9:35. Vikings 24–16. Drive: 11 plays, 57 yards, 5:31.
- UCD – Samuel Gbatu Jr. 15-yard pass from Treynor Cleeland (Treynor Cleeland–Laviel Pickett pass), 2:19. Tied 24–24. Drive: 9 plays, 75 yards, 4:35.
- UCD – Laviel Picket 22-yard pass from Treynor Cleeland (Robert Meyer kick), 0:27. Aggies 31–24. Drive: 5 plays, 80 yards, 1:26.

Statistics	UCD	PRST
First downs	21	19
Plays–yards	65–374	73–357
Rushes–yards	26–87	37–89
Passing yards	287	268
Passing: comp–att–int	22–39–1	23–36–1
Turnovers	1	1
Time of possession	26:04	33:56

Team	Category	Player	Statistics
UC Davis	Passing	Treynor Cleeland	22/39, 287 yards, 2 TD, INT
UC Davis	Rushing	Jordan Fisher	14 carries, 65 yards, 2 TD
UC Davis	Receiving	Samuel Gbatu Jr.	8 receptions, 107 yards, TD
Portland State	Passing	Tyrese Smith	23/36, 268 yards, INT
Portland State	Rushing	Delon Thompson	15 carries, 48 yards
Portland State	Receiving	Devon Anderson	6 receptions, 99 yards

=== at San Diego ===
No. 7 UC Davis Aggies (1–0) at San Diego Toreros (0–0) – Game summary

Quarter	1	2	3	4	Total
No. 7 Aggies	0	28	14	7	49
Toreros	7	0	7	3	17

at Torero Stadium • San Diego, California

- Date: September 5
- Game time: 7:00 p.m.
- Game weather: Sunny • Temperature: 83 °F (28 °C) • Wind: NE at 3 miles per hour (4.8 km/h)
- Game attendance: 4,573
- Referee: Jason Nickelby
- TV: ESPN+

Game information

First quarter

- USD – Omar Mbakwe 2-yard run (Emiliano Salazar kick), 3:24. Toreros 7–0. Drive: 11 plays, 68 yards, 6:23.

Second quarter

- UCD – Samuel Gbatu Jr. 10-yard pass from Treynor Cleeland (Robert Meyer kick), 14:57. Tied 7–7. Drive: 2 plays, 32 yards, 0:23.
- UCD – Jordan Fisher 1-yard run (Robert Meyer kick), 10:26. Aggies 14–7. Drive: 3 plays, 31 yards, 0:37.
- UCD – Edward Khutsishvili 13-yard pass from Treynor Cleeland (Robert Meyer kick), 10:04. Aggies 21–7. Drive: 1 plays, 13 yards, 0:12.
- UCD – Jordan Fisher 31-yard pass from Treynor Cleeland (Robert Meyer kick), 1:53. Aggies 28–7. Drive: 2 plays, 55 yards, 0:13.

Third quarter

- UCD – Tyler Hennessy 5-yard pass from Treynor Cleeland (Robert Meyer kick), 9:57. Aggies 35–7. Drive: 8 plays, 96 yards, 3:24.
- UCD – Matteo Perez 79-yard run (Robert Meyer kick), 7:11. Aggies 42–7. Drive: 4 plays, 90 yards, 1:12.
- USD – Cole Monach 22-yard pass from Dom Nankil (Emiliano Salazar kick), 5:03. Aggies 42–14. Drive: 5 plays, 75 yards, 2:08.

Fourth quarter

- USD – Emiliano Salazar 34-yard field goal, 13:59. Aggies 42–17. Drive: 8 plays, 49 yards, 3:14.
- UCD – Samuel Gbatu Jr. 8-yard pass from Treynor Cleeland (Robert Meyer kick), 14:57. Aggies 49–17. Drive: 12 plays, 75 yards, 6:29.

Statistics	UCD	USD
First downs	25	16
Plays–yards	67–537	67–328
Rushes–yards	34–231	35–146
Passing yards	306	182
Passing: comp–att–int	24–33–1	17–32–2
Turnovers	1	2
Time of possession	29:47	30:08

Team	Category	Player	Statistics
UC Davis	Passing	Treynor Cleeland	22/31, 294 yards, 5 TD, INT
UC Davis	Rushing	Matteo Perez	9 carries, 123 yards, TD
UC Davis	Receiving	Samuel Gbatu Jr.	9 receptions, 129 yards, 2 TD
San Diego	Passing	Dom Nankil	16/31, 177 yards, TD, 2 INT
San Diego	Rushing	Adam Criter	14 carries, 54 yards
San Diego	Receiving	Cole Monach	6 receptions, 72 yards, TD

=== at No. 17 (FBS) SMU ===
No. 7 UC Davis Aggies (2–0) at No. 17 (FBS) SMU Mustangs (1–0) – Game summary

Quarter	1	2	3	4	Total
No. 7 Aggies	0	0	0	10	10
No. 17 (FBS) Mustangs	14	28	7	7	56

at Gerald J. Ford Stadium • Dallas, Texas

- Date: September 12
- Game time: 1:00 p.m.
- Game weather: Sunny • Temperature: 100 °F (38 °C)
- Game attendance: 29,054
- Referee: Jerry Magallanes
- TV announcers (ACCNX/ESPN+): Robert Lee and Mo Hasan

Game information

First quarter

- SMU – Kendrick Raphael 5-yard run (Nick Reed kick), 6:40. Mustangs 7–0. Drive: 8 plays, 90 yards, 3:47.
- SMU – Derrick McFall 52-yard pass from Kevin Jennings (Nick Reed kick), 1:18. Mustangs 14–0. Drive: 3 plays, 75 yards, 0:43.

Second quarter

- SMU – Theo Melin Ohrstrom 2-yard pass from Kevin Jennings (Nick Reed kick), 12:33. Mustangs 21–0. Drive: 4 plays, 72 yards, 1:31.
- SMU – Randy Pittman Jr. 2-yard pass from Kevin Jennings (Nick Reed kick), 10:28. Mustangs 28–0. Drive: 5 plays, 67 yards, 1:12.
- SMU – Theo Melin Ohrstrom 14-yard pass from Kevin Jennings (Nick Reed kick), 0:59. Mustangs 35–0. Drive: 2 plays, 20 yards, 0:44.
- SMU – Yannick Smith 44-yard pass from Kevin Jennings (Nick Reed kick), 0:24. Mustangs 42–0. Drive: 1 play, 44 yards, 0:11.

Third quarter

- SMU – Zack Turner 8-yard pass from Ty Hawkins (Brendan Baird kick), 6:12. Mustangs 49–0. Drive: 6 plays, 65 yards, 2:37.

Fourth quarter

- UCD – Coby Herman 4-yard pass from Jackson Kollock (Robert Meyer kick), 11:18. Mustangs 49–7. Drive: 9 plays, 45 yards, 7:15.
- SMU – Aljour Miles II 3-yard pass from Ty Hawkins (Brendan Baird kick), 9:01. Mustangs 56–7. Drive: 5 plays, 50 yards, 2:10.
- UCD – Robert Meyer 33-yard field goal, 3:35. Mustangs 56–10. Drive: 6 plays, 58 yards, 3:03.

Statistics	UCD	SMU
First downs	12	20
Plays–yards	60–233	56–547
Rushes–yards	24–62	24–93
Passing yards	171	454
Passing: comp–att–int	19–36–1	27–32–0
Turnovers	2	0
Time of possession	32:40	27:20

Team	Category	Player	Statistics
UC Davis	Passing	Jackson Kollock	8/10, 88 yards, TD
UC Davis	Rushing	Jordan Fisher	8 carries, 19 yards
UC Davis	Receiving	Samuel Gbatu Jr.	5 receptions, 60 yards
SMU	Passing	Kevin Jennings	14/16, 337 yards, 5 TD
SMU	Rushing	Derrick McFall	6 carries, 46 yards
SMU	Receiving	Yamir Knight	3 receptions, 62 yards

=== Stetson ===
Stetson Hatters (1–2) at No. 11 UC Davis Aggies (2–1) – Game summary

Quarter	1	2	3	4	Total
Hatters	0	0	0	0	0
No. 11 Aggies	0	0	0	0	0

at UC Davis Health Stadium • Davis, California

- Date: September 19
- Game time: 7:00 p.m.
- TV: KMAX

Game information

First quarter
Second quarter
Third quarter
Fourth quarter

Statistics	STET	UCD
First downs		
Plays–yards		
Rushes–yards		
Passing yards		
Passing: comp–att–int		
Turnovers		
Time of possession		

Team	Category	Player	Statistics
Stetson	Passing		
Stetson	Rushing		
Stetson	Receiving		
UC Davis	Passing		
UC Davis	Rushing		
UC Davis	Receiving		

=== No. 5 Montana ===
No. 5 Montana Grizzlies (3–1) at No. 10 UC Davis Aggies (3–1) – Game summary

Quarter	1	2	3	4	Total
No. 5 Grizzlies	0	0	0	0	0
No. 10 Aggies	0	0	0	0	0

at UC Davis Health Stadium • Davis, California

- Date: September 26
- Game time: 7:00 p.m.
- TV: KMAX

Game information

First quarter
Second quarter
Third quarter
Fourth quarter

Statistics	MONT	UCD
First downs		
Plays–yards		
Rushes–yards		
Passing yards		
Passing: comp–att–int		
Turnovers		
Time of possession		

Team	Category	Player	Statistics
Montana	Passing		
Montana	Rushing		
Montana	Receiving		
UC Davis	Passing		
UC Davis	Rushing		
UC Davis	Receiving		

=== Eastern Washington ===
Eastern Washington Eagles (1–4) at No. 16 UC Davis Aggies (3–2) – Game summary

Quarter	1	2	3	4	Total
Eagles	0	0	0	0	0
No. 16 Aggies	0	0	0	0	0

at UC Davis Health Stadium • Davis, California

- Date: October 3
- Game time: 7:30 p.m.

Game information

First quarter
Second quarter
Third quarter
Fourth quarter

Statistics	EWU	UCD
First downs		
Plays–yards		
Rushes–yards		
Passing yards		
Passing: comp–att–int		
Turnovers		
Time of possession		

Team	Category	Player	Statistics
Eastern Washington	Passing		
Eastern Washington	Rushing		
Eastern Washington	Receiving		
UC Davis	Passing		
UC Davis	Rushing		
UC Davis	Receiving		

=== at Southern Utah ===
No. 14 UC Davis Aggies (4–2) at Southern Utah Thunderbirds (2–4) – Game summary

Quarter	1	2	3	4	Total
No. 14 Aggies	0	0	0	0	0
Thunderbirds	0	0	0	0	0

at Eccles Coliseum • Cedar City, Utah

- Date: October 17
- Game time: 5:00 p.m.

Game information

First quarter
Second quarter
Third quarter
Fourth quarter

Statistics	UCD	SUU
First downs		
Plays–yards		
Rushes–yards		
Passing yards		
Passing: comp–att–int		
Turnovers		
Time of possession		

Team	Category	Player	Statistics
UC Davis	Passing		
UC Davis	Rushing		
UC Davis	Receiving		
Southern Utah	Passing		
Southern Utah	Rushing		
Southern Utah	Receiving		

=== Northern Colorado ===
Northern Colorado Bears (3–5) at No. 20 UC Davis Aggies (4–3) – Game summary

Quarter	1	2	3	4	Total
Bears	0	0	0	0	0
No. 20 Aggies	0	0	0	0	0

at UC Davis Health Stadium • Davis, California

- Date: October 24
- Game time: 4:00 p.m.
- TV: KMAX

Game information

First quarter
Second quarter
Third quarter
Fourth quarter

Statistics	UNCO	UCD
First downs		
Plays–yards		
Rushes–yards		
Passing yards		
Passing: comp–att–int		
Turnovers		
Time of possession		

Team	Category	Player	Statistics
Northern Colorado	Passing		
Northern Colorado	Rushing		
Northern Colorado	Receiving		
UC Davis	Passing		
UC Davis	Rushing		
UC Davis	Receiving		

=== at No. 22 Weber State ===
No. 20 UC Davis Aggies (5–3) at No. 22 Weber State Wildcats (5–4) – Game summary

Quarter	1	2	3	4	Total
No. 20 Aggies	0	0	0	0	0
No. 22 Wildcats	0	0	0	0	0

at Stewart Stadium • Ogden, Utah

- Date: October 31
- Game time: 12:00 p.m.

Game information

First quarter
Second quarter
Third quarter
Fourth quarter

Statistics	UCD	WEB
First downs		
Plays–yards		
Rushes–yards		
Passing yards		
Passing: comp–att–int		
Turnovers		
Time of possession		

Team	Category	Player	Statistics
UC Davis	Passing		
UC Davis	Rushing		
UC Davis	Receiving		
Weber State	Passing		
Weber State	Rushing		
Weber State	Receiving		

=== Utah Tech ===
Utah Tech Trailblazers (1–8) at UC Davis Aggies (5–4) – Game summary

Quarter	1	2	3	4	Total
Trailblazers	0	0	0	0	0
Aggies	0	0	0	0	0

at UC Davis Health Stadium • Davis, California

- Date: November 7
- Game time: 4:00 p.m.
- TV: KMAX

Game information

First quarter
Second quarter
Third quarter
Fourth quarter

Statistics	UTU	UCD
First downs		
Plays–yards		
Rushes–yards		
Passing yards		
Passing: comp–att–int		
Turnovers		
Time of possession		

Team	Category	Player	Statistics
Utah Tech	Passing		
Utah Tech	Rushing		
Utah Tech	Receiving		
UC Davis	Passing		
UC Davis	Rushing		
UC Davis	Receiving		

=== at Idaho ===
No. 23 UC Davis Aggies (6–4) at Idaho Vandals (5–5) – Game summary

Quarter	1	2	3	4	Total
No. 23 Aggies	0	0	0	0	0
Vandals	0	0	0	0	0

at Kibbie Dome • Moscow, Idaho

- Date: November 14
- Game time: 1:00 p.m.

Game information

First quarter
Second quarter
Third quarter
Fourth quarter

Statistics	UCD	IDHO
First downs		
Plays–yards		
Rushes–yards		
Passing yards		
Passing: comp–att–int		
Turnovers		
Time of possession		

Team	Category	Player	Statistics
UC Davis	Passing		
UC Davis	Rushing		
UC Davis	Receiving		
Idaho	Passing		
Idaho	Rushing		
Idaho	Receiving		

=== Cal Poly (Battle for the Golden Horseshoe) ===
Cal Poly Mustangs (4–7) at No. 23 UC Davis Aggies (7–4) – Game summary

Quarter	1	2	3	4	Total
Mustangs	0	0	0	0	0
No. 23 Aggies	0	0	0	0	0

at UC Davis Health Stadium • Davis, California

- Date: November 21
- Game time: 1:00 p.m.
- TV: KMAX

Game information

First quarter
Second quarter
Third quarter
Fourth quarter

Statistics	CP	UCD
First downs		
Plays–yards		
Rushes–yards		
Passing yards		
Passing: comp–att–int		
Turnovers		
Time of possession		

Team	Category	Player	Statistics
Cal Poly	Passing		
Cal Poly	Rushing		
Cal Poly	Receiving		
UC Davis	Passing		
UC Davis	Rushing		
UC Davis	Receiving		

== Rankings ==
Ranking movements Legend: ██ Increase in ranking ██ Decrease in ranking RV = Received votes
	Week														
Poll	Pre	1	2	3	4	5	6	7	8	9	10	11	12	13	Final
STATS FCS	6	7	7	11	10	16	14	14	20	20	RV	23	23		
Coaches	6	6	6	11	9	15	11	12	21	21	RV	RV	23		
