= Thomas Ford (American football) =

American football coach

Current position
- Title: Head coach
- Team: Idaho
- Conference: Big Sky
- Record: 9–15 (.375)

Biographical details
- Born: c. 1981 (age 44–45); Seattle, Washington, U.S.
- Education: Linfield University (2004); Southeastern Oklahoma State University (2009)

Playing career

Football
- 2001–2004: Linfield
- 2005–2006: Tri-Cities Fever
- 2007: Alaska Wild

Track and field
- 2001–2004: Linfield
- Position: Running back (football)

Coaching career (HC unless noted)

Football
- 2007–2008: Linfield (RB)
- 2009–2011: SE Oklahoma State (ST/WR)
- 2012: Puget Sound (ST/DB)
- 2013: Puget Sound (DC)
- 2014–2017: Stadium HS (WA)
- 2018–2019: Simon Fraser
- 2020–2021: Washington (OQC)
- 2022–2023: Idaho (ST/RB)
- 2024: Oregon State (RB)
- 2025–present: Idaho

Head coaching record
- Overall: 11–33 (.250) (college); 13–28 (.317) (high school)

Accomplishments and honors

Awards
- 2× All-NWC (2003–2004); Linfield Hall of Fame (2016); GNAC Coach of the Year (2018)

Thomas Ford (b. c. 1981) is an American college football coach, currently the head coach at the University of Idaho, a position he has held since December 2024. He was the head coach at Stadium High School in Tacoma, Washington, from 2014 to 2017 and Simon Fraser University from 2018 to 2019. Ford also coached for Linfield, Southeastern Oklahoma State, Puget Sound, Washington, Idaho, and Oregon State. He played college football for Linfield as a running back and graduated from Mountlake Terrace High School, north of Seattle, in 1999.

== Head coaching record ==
=== College ===
Year	Team	Overall	Conference	Standing	Bowl/playoffs
Simon Fraser Clan (Great Northwest Athletic Conference) (2018–2019)
2018	Simon Fraser	1–9	0–8	5th	
2019	Simon Fraser	1–9	1–5	T–3rd	
Simon Fraser:		2–18	1–13		
Idaho Vandals (Big Sky Conference) (2025–present)
2025	Idaho	4–8	2–6	T–8th	
2026	Idaho	5–7	5–4		
Idaho:		9–15	7–10		
Total:		11–33			

=== High school ===
Year	Team	Overall	Conference	Standing	Bowl/playoffs
Stadium Tigers () (2014–2017)
2014	Stadium	0–10	0–5	7th	
2015	Stadium	3–8	2–5	6th	
2016	Stadium	6–4	4–2	4th	
2017	Stadium	4–6	3–4	5th	
Stadium:		13–28	9–16		
Total:		13–28			
