= 2026 Cal Poly Mustangs football team =

American college football season

2026 Cal Poly Mustangs football
- Conference: Big Sky Conference
- Record: 4–8 (3–6 Big Sky)
- Head coach: Tim Skipper (1st season)
- Offensive coordinator: Anthony Soto (1st season)
- Offensive scheme: Pro spread
- Defensive coordinator: Sammy Lawanson (1st season)
- Base defense: Multiple 4–3
- Home stadium: Mustang Memorial Field

2026 Big Sky Conference football standings
	Conf.			Overall
Team	W		L	W		L
No. 2 Montana State $^	8	–	1	11	–	1
No. 15 Weber State	7	–	2	8	–	4
No. 12 Northern Arizona	7	–	2	9	–	3
No. 8 Montana	6	–	3	8	–	4
No. 23 UC Davis	6	–	3	8	–	4
Idaho	5	–	4	5	–	7
Southern Utah	4	–	4	6	–	6
No. 25 Idaho State	4	–	5	7	–	5
Cal Poly	3	–	6	4	–	8
Portland State	3	–	6	3	–	9
Eastern Washington	2	–	7	3	–	9
Northern Colorado	2	–	7	3	–	9
Utah Tech	1	–	8	1	–	11
$ – Conference champion; ^ – FCS playoff participant; As of November 22, 2026; Rankings from STATS Poll

The 2026 Cal Poly Mustangs football team represents California Polytechnic State University, San Luis Obispo as a member of the Big Sky Conference during the 2026 NCAA Division I FCS football season. The Mustangs are led by first-year head coach Tim Skipper and play their home games at Mustang Memorial Field in San Luis Obispo, California.

== Offseason ==
=== Coaching changes ===
On November 23, 2025, Paul Wulff was fired as the Mustangs' head coach, finishing his Cal Poly tenure with an overall record of 10–24 through three seasons. On December 3, 2025, UCLA interim head coach Tim Skipper was named the Mustangs' new head coach. On January 2, 2026, Sammy Lawanson was hired as the Mustangs' defensive coordinator/safeties coach, having previously served as a co-defensive coordinator at Bowling Green from 2022 to 2024. Ten days later, January 13, Mercer offensive coordinator/quarterbacks coach Anthony Soto was hired for the same position at Cal Poly.

== Big Sky prediction polls ==
The Big Sky Conference released its preseason prediction polls on July 20, 2026. The Mustangs were predicted to finish 11th in the coaches poll and 9th in the media poll.

== Schedule ==
Date	Time	Opponent	Site	TV	Result	Attendance
August 28	7:00 p.m.	Idaho	Mustang Memorial Field; San Luis Obispo, CA	ESPN	W 38–34	11,186‡
September 5	5:00 p.m.	No. 6 (DII) Central Washington*	Mustang Memorial Field; San Luis Obispo, CA	ESPN+	W 24–17	8,034
September 12	6:00 p.m.	at San Jose State*	CEFCU Stadium; San Jose, CA	MW+/NBCSBA	L 20–30	15,017
September 19	5:00 p.m.	San Diego*	Mustang Memorial Field; San Luis Obispo, CA	ESPN+	L 35–38	10,259
September 26	4:00 p.m.	at Eastern Washington	Roos Field; Cheney, WA	ESPN+	W 31–27	5,320
October 3	5:00 p.m.	Weber State	Mustang Memorial Field; San Luis Obispo, CA	ESPN+	L 34–42 ^{2OT}	11,186
October 10	3:00 p.m.	at No. 16 Idaho State	ICCU Dome; Pocatello, ID	ESPN+	W 25–24	9,483
October 17	5:00 p.m.	at Northern Colorado	Nottingham Field; Greeley, CO	ESPN+	L 18–28	4,580
October 24	2:00 p.m.	Utah Tech	Mustang Memorial Field; San Luis Obispo, CA	ESPN+	L 26–43	6,478
October 31	12:00 p.m.	at No. 3 Montana State	Bobcat Stadium; Bozeman, MT	ESPN+	L 7–61	21,897
November 7	2:00 p.m.	No. 6 Northern Arizona	Mustang Memorial Field; San Luis Obispo, CA	ESPN+	L 10–38	6,234
November 21	1:00 p.m.	at No. 23 UC Davis	UC Davis Health Stadium; Davis, CA (Battle for the Golden Horseshoe)	ESPN+	L 43–44	9,274
*Non-conference game; Rankings from STATS Poll released prior to the game; All times are in Pacific time

‡New Mustang Memorial Field attendance record.

== Game summaries ==
=== Idaho ===
Idaho Vandals (0–0) at Cal Poly Mustangs (0–0) – Game summary

Quarter	1	2	3	4	Total
Vandals	3	7	6	18	34
Mustangs	7	14	0	17	38

at Mustang Memorial Field • San Luis Obispo, California

- Date: August 28
- Game time: 7:00 p.m. PDT
- Game weather: Cloudy, 72 °F (22 °C)
- Game attendance: 11,186
- Referee: Robert Quello
- TV announcers (ESPN): Roxy Bernstein, Dave Clawson and Madison Hock
- Box score, Recap

Game information
First quarter
- CP – Alek Marshall 17-yard pass from Anthony Grigsby Jr. (Noah Thayer kick), 11:44. Mustangs 7–0. Drive: 7 plays, 48 yards, 3:05.
- IDHO – Owen Forsman 23-yard field goal, 2:47. Mustangs 7–3. Drive: 11 plays, 81 yards, 5:53.

Second quarter

- CP – Misa Paiau 1-yard pass from Anthony Grigsby Jr. (Noah Thayer kick), 9:49. Mustangs 14–3. Drive: 16 plays, 75 yards, 7:58.
- IDHO – Ferrari Miller 7-yard run (Owen Forsman kick), 4:45. Mustangs 14–10. Drive: 11 plays, 86 yards, 4:57.
- CP – Fidel Pitts 16-yard pass from Anthony Grigsby Jr. (Noah Thayer kick), 1:53. Mustangs 21–10. Drive: 6 plays, 75 yards, 2:52.

Third quarter

- IDHO – Owen Forsman 40-yard field goal, 11:02. Mustangs 21–13. Drive: 9 plays, 53 yards, 3:58.
- IDHO – Owen Forsman 44-yard field goal, 1:42. Mustangs 21–16. Drive: 12 plays, 40 yards, 6:15.

Fourth quarter

- CP – Noah Thayer 28-yard field goal, 11:40. Mustangs 24–16. Drive: 12 plays, 56 yards, 5:02.
- IDHO – Tony Harste 5-yard pass from Joshua Wood (Joshua Wood pass to Noah West-Baranco), 9:55. Tied 24–24. Drive: 3 plays, 73 yards, 1:38.
- IDHO – Tony Harste 75-yard pass from Joshua Wood (Owen Forsman kick), 6:10. Vandals 31–24. Drive: 3 plays, 78 yards, 1:00.
- CP – Anthony Grigsby Jr. 15-yard run (Noah Thayer kick), 2:16. Tied 31–31. Drive: 9 plays, 65 yards, 3:54.
- IDHO – Owen Forsman 40-yard field goal, 1:03. Vandals 34–31. Drive: 6 plays, 52 yards, 1:13.
- CP – Tayvion McCoy 34-yard pass from Anthony Grigsby Jr. (Noah Thayer kick), 0:09. Mustangs 38–34. Drive: 5 plays, 77 yards, 0:48.

Statistics	IDHO	CP
First downs	18	29
Plays–yards	59–482	78–516
Rushes–yards	34–119	42–197
Passing yards	363	319
Passing: comp–att–int	18–25–0	26–36–0
Turnovers	0	0
Time of possession	27:34	32:26

Team	Category	Player	Statistics
Idaho	Passing	Joshua Wood	18/25, 363 yards, 2 TD
Idaho	Rushing	Ferrari Miller	12 carries, 44 yards, TD
Idaho	Receiving	Tony Harste	9 receptions, 180 yards, 2 TD
Cal Poly	Passing	Anthony Grigsby Jr.	26/35, 319 yards, 4 TD
Cal Poly	Rushing	Jaden Green	15 carries, 71 yards
Cal Poly	Receiving	Tayvion McCoy	10 receptions, 170 yards, TD

=== No. 6 (DII) Central Washington ===
No. 6 (DII) Central Washington Wildcats (0–0) at Cal Poly Mustangs (1–0) – Game summary

Quarter	1	2	3	4	Total
No. 6 (DII) Wildcats	7	0	0	10	17
Mustangs	0	17	7	0	24

at Mustang Memorial Field • San Luis Obispo, California

- Date: September 5
- Game time: 5:00 p.m. PDT
- Game weather: Sunny, 76 °F (24 °C)
- Game attendance: 8,034
- Referee: Jim Crowley
- TV: ESPN+
- Box score, Recap

Game information
First quarter
- CEN – Justin Brennan 1-yard run (David Weber kick), 1:47. Wildcats 7–0. Drive: 16 plays, 85 yards, 9:24.

Second quarter

- CP – Ray Hall 55-yard pass from Anthony Grigsby Jr. (Noah Thayer kick), 10:58. Tied 7–7. Drive: 1 play, 55 yards, 0:07.
- CP – Fidel Pitts 4-yard pass from Anthony Grigsby Jr. (Noah Thayer kick), 6:47. Mustangs 14–7. Drive: 5 plays, 53 yards, 1:59.
- CP – Noah Thayer 33-yard field goal, 0:00. Mustangs 17–7. Drive: 6 plays, 58 yards, 0:38.

Third quarter

- CP – Ray Hall 35-yard pass from Anthony Grigsby Jr. (Noah Thayer kick), 14:12. Mustangs 24–7. Drive: 2 plays, 35 yards, 0:37.

Fourth quarter

- CEN – Mason Juergens 9-yard pass from Justin Brennan (David Weber kick), 11:06. Mustangs 24–14. Drive: 9 plays, 80 yards, 5:14.
- CEN – David Weber 23-yard field goal, 1:49. Mustangs 24–17. Drive: 12 plays, 66 yards, 4:41.

Statistics	CEN	CP
First downs	23	19
Plays–yards	77–430	61–384
Rushes–yards	41–168	34–180
Passing yards	262	204
Passing: comp–att–int	25–36–1	15–27–0
Turnovers	2	0
Time of possession	36:06	23:53

Team	Category	Player	Statistics
Central Washington	Passing	Justin Brennan	25/36, 262 yards, TD, INT
Central Washington	Rushing	Ryder Bumgarner	21 carries, 99 yards
Central Washington	Receiving	Mason Juergens	10 receptions, 114 yards, TD
Cal Poly	Passing	Anthony Grigsby Jr.	15/27, 204 yards, 3 TD
Cal Poly	Rushing	Jaden Green	13 carries, 94 yards
Cal Poly	Receiving	Ray Hall	5 receptions, 125 yards, 2 TD

=== at San Jose State (FBS) ===
Cal Poly Mustangs (2–0) at San Jose State Spartans (FBS) (1–1) – Game summary

Quarter	1	2	3	4	Total
Mustangs	0	6	7	7	20
Spartans (FBS)	0	13	7	10	30

at CEFCU Stadium • San Jose, CA

- Date: September 12
- Game time: 6:00 p.m. PDT
- Game weather: Sunny • Temperature: 72 °F (22 °C) • Wind: NW 15 mph
- Game attendance: 15,017
- Referee: Douglas Mercer
- TV announcers (MW+/NBCSBA): Neal Ruhl, James Jones and Lindsey Pallares
- Box score, Recap

Game information

First quarter

- No scoring plays.

Second quarter

- CP – Fidel Pitts 2-yard run (Josue Lopez kick failed), 14:03. Mustangs 6–0. Drive: 11 plays, 75 yards, 4:44.
- SJSU – Carson Clark 5-yard pass from Luke Weaver (Trajan Sinatra kick), 11:43. Spartans 7–6. Drive: 6 plays, 75 yards, 2:15.
- SJSU – Trajan Sinatra 44-yard field goal, 5:07. Spartans 10–6. Drive: 10 plays, 39 yards, 4:59.
- SJSU – Trajan Sinatra 32-yard field goal, 0:02. Spartans 13–6. Drive: 15 plays, 57 yards, 3:09.

Third quarter

- CP – Jaden Green 6-yard pass from Anthony Grigsby Jr. (Josue Lopez kick), 12:41. Tied 13–13. Drive: 5 plays, 65 yards, 2:19.
- SJSU – Cooper Hoch 2-yard pass from Luke Weaver (Trajan Sinatra kick), 4:29. Spartans 20–13. Drive: 10 plays, 49 yards, 3:30.

Fourth quarter

- CP – Misa Paiau 1-yard run (Josue Lopez kick), 14:29. Tied 20–20. Drive: 12 plays, 80 yards, 4:54.
- SJSU – Trajan Sinatra 40-yard field goal, 11:59. Spartans 23–20. Drive: 6 plays, 21 yards, 2:23.
- SJSU – Carson Clark 41-yard pass from Luke Weaver (Trajan Sinatra kick), 7:20. Spartans 30–20. Drive: 6 plays, 80 yards, 2:54.

Statistics	CP	SJSU
First downs	20	27
Plays–yards	69–340	78–493
Rushes–yards	29–91	44–255
Passing yards	249	238
Passing: comp–att–int	24–40–2	22–34–0
Turnovers	2	1
Time of possession	28:58	32:02

Team	Category	Player	Statistics
Cal Poly	Passing	Anthony Grigsby Jr.	24/40, 249 yards, TD, 2 INT
Cal Poly	Rushing	Jaden Green	10 carries, 52 yards
Cal Poly	Receiving	Fidel Pitts	5 receptions, 103 yards
San Jose State	Passing	Luke Weaver	22/34, 238 yards, 3 TD
San Jose State	Rushing	Jabari Bates	27 carries, 163 yards
San Jose State	Receiving	Carson Clark	8 receptions, 81 yards, 2 TD

=== San Diego ===
San Diego Toreros (0–2) at Cal Poly Mustangs (2–1) – Game summary

Quarter	1	2	3	4	Total
Toreros	14	14	7	3	38
Mustangs	7	14	7	7	35

at Mustang Memorial Field • San Luis Obispo, California

- Date: September 19
- Game time: 5:00 p.m. PDT
- Game weather: Sunny • Temperature: 70 °F (21 °C) • Wind: NW 10 mph
- Game attendance: 10,259
- Referee: Spencer Mumford
- TV: ESPN+
- Box score, Recap

Game information
First quarter
- USD – Cole Monach 7-yard pass from Dom Nankil (Emiliano Salazar kick), 5:28. Toreros 7–0. Drive: 16 plays, 88 yards, 8:07.
- CP – Jaden Green 8-yard run (Josue Lopez kick), 3:48. Tied 7–7. Drive: 6 plays, 52 yards, 1:34.
- USD – Adam Criter 55-yard run (Emiliano Salazar kick), 1:52. Toreros 14–7. Drive: 5 plays, 75 yards, 1:56.

Second quarter

- CP – Misa Paiau 26-yard run (Josue Lopez kick), 13:38. Tied 14–14. Drive: 6 plays, 73 yards, 3:07.
- USD – Cole Monach 22-yard pass from Dom Nankil (Emiliano Salazar kick), 6:11. Toreros 21–14. Drive: 6 plays, 59 yards, 2:22.
- CP – Tayvion McCoy 12-yard pass from Anthony Grigsby Jr. (Josue Lopez kick), 3:13. Tied 21–21. Drive: 6 plays, 72 yards, 2:53.
- USD – Dom Nankil 1-yard run (Emiliano Salazar kick), 0:06. Toreros 28–21. Drive: 10 plays, 79 yards, 3:02.

Third quarter

- USD – Omar Mbakwe 1-yard run (Emiliano Salazar kick), 10:09. Toreros 35–21. Drive: 11 plays, 75 yards, 4:51.
- CP – Tayvion McCoy 28-yard pass from Anthony Grigsby Jr. (Josue Lopez kick), 7:32. Toreros 35–28. Drive: 6 plays, 75 yards, 2:37.

Fourth quarter

- CP – Fidel Pitts 10-yard pass from Anthony Grigsby Jr. (Josue Lopez kick), 8:23. Tied 35–35. Drive: 5 plays, 36 yards, 1:57.
- USD – Emiliano Salazar 38-yard field goal, 0:02. Toreros 38–35. Drive: 8 plays, 57 yards, 1:04.

Statistics	USD	CP
First downs	29	18
Plays–yards	78–499	52–384
Rushes–yards	47–263	29–173
Passing yards	236	211
Passing: comp–att–int	25–31–0	14–23–0
Turnovers	0	1
Time of possession	35:49	24:11

Team	Category	Player	Statistics
San Diego	Passing	Dom Nankil	25/30, 236 yards, 2 TD
San Diego	Rushing	Adam Criter	28 carries, 178 yards, TD
San Diego	Receiving	Cole Monach	8 receptions, 87 yards, 2 TD
Cal Poly	Passing	Anthony Grigsby Jr.	14/23, 211 yards, 3 TD
Cal Poly	Rushing	Jaden Green	17 carries, 126 yards, TD
Cal Poly	Receiving	Tayvion McCoy	5 receptions, 105 yards, 2 TD

=== at Eastern Washington ===
Cal Poly Mustangs (2–2) at Eastern Washington Eagles (1–3) – Game summary

Quarter	1	2	3	4	Total
Mustangs	7	7	10	7	31
Eagles	6	7	14	0	27

at Roos Field • Cheney, Washington

- Date: September 26
- Game time: 4:00 p.m. PDT
- Game attendance: 5,320
- TV: ESPN+
- Box score, Recap

Game information

First quarter
Second quarter
Third quarter
Fourth quarter

Statistics	CP	EWU
First downs		
Plays–yards		
Rushes–yards		
Passing yards		
Passing: comp–att–int		
Turnovers		
Time of possession		

Team	Category	Player	Statistics
Cal Poly	Passing		
Cal Poly	Rushing		
Cal Poly	Receiving		
Eastern Washington	Passing		
Eastern Washington	Rushing		
Eastern Washington	Receiving		

=== Weber State ===
Weber State Wildcats (2–3) at Cal Poly Mustangs (3–2) – Game summary

Quarter	1	2	3	4	OT	2OT	Total
Wildcats	7	10	7	3	7	8	42
Mustangs	3	6	11	7	7	0	34

at Mustang Memorial Field • San Luis Obispo, California

- Date: October 3
- Game time: 5:00 p.m. PDT
- Game weather: Sunny • Temperature: 84 °F (29 °C) • Wind: NW at 10 miles per hour (16 km/h)
- Game attendance: 11,186
- Referee: Gregg Wilson
- TV announcers (ESPN+): Max Kelton (play-by-play) and John Kane (analyst)
- Box score, Recap

Game information

First quarter

- CP – 10:06 Josue Lopez 37-yard Field Goal. CP 3–0. Drive: 13 plays, 56 yards, 4:54.
- WEB – 3:11 Tate Kjar 39-yard pass from Nate Dahle (David Dellenbach kick). WEB 7–3. Drive: 6 plays, 92 yards, 2:06.

Second quarter

- WEB – 13:14 David Dellenbach 30-yard Field Goal. WEB 10–3. Drive: 4 plays, -8 yards, 1:31.
- CP – 5:33 Alek Marshall 11-yard pass from Anthony Grigsby Jr. (kick failed). WEB 10–9. Drive: 7 plays, 40 yards, 3:25.
- WEB – 0:57 Seth Rigtrup 13-yard run (David Dellenbach kick). WEB 17–9. Drive: 11 plays, 75 yards, 4:36.

Third quarter

- CP – 12:30 Jaden Green 2-yard run (Luke Leighton pass from Anthony Grisgby Jr.). TIED 17–17. Drive: 4 plays, 60 yards, 1:41.
- CP – 7:16 Josue Lopez 22-yard Field Goal. CP 20–17. Drive: 8 plays, 38 yards, 4:00.
- WEB – 1:10 Spencer Ferguson 1-yard run (David Dellenbach kick). WEB 24–20. Drive: 12 plays, 75 yards, 6:06.

Fourth quarter

- CP – 8:53 Fidel Pitts 15-yard pass from Anthony Grigsby Jr. (Josue Lopez kick). CP 27–24. Drive: 5 plays, 85 yards, 2:17.
- WEB – 0:55 David Dellenbach 38-yard Field Goal. TIED 27–27. Drive: 8 plays, 60 yards, 1:12.

Overtime

- CP – 0:00 Jaden Green 3-yard run (Josue Lopez kick kick). CP 34–27. Drive: 4 plays, 25 yards.
- WEB – 0:00 Naye Dahle 25-yard run (David Dellenbach kick). TIED 34–34. Drive: 2 plays, 25 yards.

Double Overtime

- WEB – 0:00 Tate Kjar 9-yard pass from Nate Dahle (Noah Kjar pass from Nate Dahle). WSI 42–34. Drive: 5 plays, 25 yards.

Statistics	WEB	CP
First downs	22	24
Plays–yards	66–371	80–455
Rushes–yards	33–148	53–242
Passing yards	223	213
Passing: comp–att–int	15–33–2	17–27–1
Turnovers	2	1
Time of possession	24:20	35:40

Team	Category	Player	Statistics
Weber State	Passing	Nate Dahle	15/33, 223 yards, 2 TD, 2 INT
Weber State	Rushing	Nate Dahle	15 carries, 85 yards
Weber State	Receiving	Tate Kjar	5 receptions, 89 yards, 2 TD
Cal Poly	Passing	Anthony Grigsby Jr.	17/27, 213 yards, 2 TD, INT
Cal Poly	Rushing	Jaden Green	31 carries, 75 yards, 2 TD
Cal Poly	Receiving	Ray Hall	4 receptions, 86 yards

=== at No. 16 Idaho State ===
Cal Poly Mustangs (3–2) at No. 16 Idaho State Bengals (4–1) – Game summary

Quarter	1	2	3	4	Total
Mustangs	7	3	8	7	25
No. 16 Bengals	3	10	5	6	24

at ICCU Dome • Pocatello, Idaho

- Date: October 10
- Game time: 3:00 p.m. PDT / 4:00 p.m. MDT
- Game attendance: 9,483
- TV: ESPN+
- Box score, Recap

Game information

First quarter
Second quarter
Third quarter
Fourth quarter

Statistics	CP	IDST
First downs		
Plays–yards		
Rushes–yards		
Passing yards		
Passing: comp–att–int		
Turnovers		
Time of possession		

Team	Category	Player	Statistics
Cal Poly	Passing		
Cal Poly	Rushing		
Cal Poly	Receiving		
Idaho State	Passing		
Idaho State	Rushing		
Idaho State	Receiving		

=== at Northern Colorado ===
Cal Poly Mustangs (4–3) at Northern Colorado Bears (2–5) – Game summary

Quarter	1	2	3	4	Total
Mustangs	7	3	8	0	18
Bears	0	14	7	7	28

at Nottingham Field • Greeley, Colorado

- Date: October 17
- Game time: 5:00 p.m. PDT / 6:00 p.m. MDT
- Game attendance: 4,580
- TV: ESPN+
- Box score, Recap

Game information

First quarter
Second quarter
Third quarter
Fourth quarter

Statistics	CP	UNCO
First downs		
Plays–yards		
Rushes–yards		
Passing yards		
Passing: comp–att–int		
Turnovers		
Time of possession		

Team	Category	Player	Statistics
Cal Poly	Passing		
Cal Poly	Rushing		
Cal Poly	Receiving		
Northern Colorado	Passing		
Northern Colorado	Rushing		
Northern Colorado	Receiving		

=== Utah Tech ===
Utah Tech Trailblazers (0–7) at Cal Poly Mustangs (4–4) – Game summary

Quarter	1	2	3	4	Total
Trailblazers	14	6	7	16	43
Mustangs	8	3	8	7	26

at Mustang Memorial Field • San Luis Obispo, California

- Date: October 24
- Game time: 2:00 p.m. PDT
- Game attendance: 6,478
- TV: ESPN+
- Box score, Recap

Game information

First quarter
Second quarter
Third quarter
Fourth quarter

Statistics	UTU	CP
First downs		
Plays–yards		
Rushes–yards		
Passing yards		
Passing: comp–att–int		
Turnovers		
Time of possession		

Team	Category	Player	Statistics
Utah Tech	Passing		
Utah Tech	Rushing		
Utah Tech	Receiving		
Cal Poly	Passing		
Cal Poly	Rushing		
Cal Poly	Receiving		

=== at No. 3 Montana State ===
Cal Poly Mustangs (4–5) at No. 3 Montana State Bobcats (7–1) – Game summary

Quarter	1	2	3	4	Total
Mustangs	0	7	0	0	7
No. 3 Bobcats	27	21	13	0	61

at Bobcat Stadium • Bozeman, Montana

- Date: October 31
- Game time: 12:00 p.m. PDT / 1:00 p.m. MDT
- Game attendance: 21,897
- TV: ESPN+
- Box score, Recap

Game information

First quarter
Second quarter
Third quarter
Fourth quarter

Statistics	CP	MTST
First downs		
Plays–yards		
Rushes–yards		
Passing yards		
Passing: comp–att–int		
Turnovers		
Time of possession		

Team	Category	Player	Statistics
Cal Poly	Passing		
Cal Poly	Rushing		
Cal Poly	Receiving		
Montana State	Passing		
Montana State	Rushing		
Montana State	Receiving		

=== No. 6 Northern Arizona ===
No. 6 Northern Arizona Lumberjacks (7–2) at Cal Poly Mustangs (4–6) – Game summary

Quarter	1	2	3	4	Total
No. 6 Lumberjacks	7	17	6	8	38
Mustangs	0	7	3	0	10

at Mustang Memorial Field • San Luis Obispo, California

- Date: November 7
- Game time: 2:00 p.m. PST
- Game attendance: 6,234
- TV: ESPN+
- Box score, Recap

Game information

First quarter
Second quarter
Third quarter
Fourth quarter

Statistics	NAU	CP
First downs		
Plays–yards		
Rushes–yards		
Passing yards		
Passing: comp–att–int		
Turnovers		
Time of possession		

Team	Category	Player	Statistics
Northern Arizona	Passing		
Northern Arizona	Rushing		
Northern Arizona	Receiving		
Cal Poly	Passing		
Cal Poly	Rushing		
Cal Poly	Receiving		

=== at No. 23 UC Davis (Battle for the Golden Horseshoe) ===
Cal Poly Mustangs (4–7) at No. 23 UC Davis Aggies (7–4) – Game summary

Quarter	1	2	3	4	Total
Mustangs	0	0	0	0	0
No. 23 Aggies	0	0	0	0	0

at UC Davis Health Stadium • Davis, California

- Date: November 21
- Game time: 1:00 p.m. PST
- TV: ESPN+

Game information

First quarter
Second quarter
Third quarter
Fourth quarter

Statistics	CP	UCD
First downs		
Plays–yards		
Rushes–yards		
Passing yards		
Passing: comp–att–int		
Turnovers		
Time of possession		

Team	Category	Player	Statistics
Cal Poly	Passing		
Cal Poly	Rushing		
Cal Poly	Receiving		
UC Davis	Passing		
UC Davis	Rushing		
UC Davis	Receiving		
