= 2026 Montana Grizzlies football team =

American college football season

2026 Montana Grizzlies football
- Conference: Big Sky Conference

Ranking
- STATS: No. 8
- FCS Coaches: No. 9
- Record: 8–4 (6–3 Big Sky)
- Head coach: Bobby Kennedy (1st season)
- Offensive coordinator: Brent Pease (4th season)
- Offensive scheme: Multiple
- Defensive coordinator: Eric Sanders (1st season)
- Base defense: 4–3 or 3–4
- Home stadium: Washington–Grizzly Stadium

2026 Big Sky Conference football standings
	Conf.			Overall
Team	W		L	W		L
No. 2 Montana State $^	8	–	1	11	–	1
No. 15 Weber State ^	7	–	2	8	–	4
No. 12 Northern Arizona ^	7	–	2	9	–	3
No. 8 Montana ^	6	–	3	8	–	4
No. 23 UC Davis	6	–	3	8	–	4
Idaho	5	–	4	5	–	7
Southern Utah	4	–	4	6	–	6
No. 25 Idaho State ^	4	–	5	7	–	5
Cal Poly	3	–	6	4	–	8
Portland State	3	–	6	3	–	9
Eastern Washington	2	–	7	3	–	9
Northern Colorado	2	–	7	3	–	9
Utah Tech	1	–	8	1	–	11
$ – Conference champion; ^ – FCS playoff participant; As of November 22, 2026; Rankings from STATS Poll

The 2026 Montana Grizzlies football team represents the University of Montana as a member of the Big Sky Conference during the 2026 NCAA Division I FCS football season. The Grizzlies are led by first-year head coach Bobby Kennedy and plays their home games at Washington–Grizzly Stadium in Missoula, Montana.

== Schedule ==
Date	Time	Opponent	Rank	Site	TV	Result	Attendance
August 29	7:00 p.m.	Southern Utah	No. 2	Washington–Grizzly Stadium; Missoula, MT	ESPN+	W 28–21	26,829
September 5	7:00 p.m.	Drake*	No. 3	Washington–Grizzly Stadium; Missoula, MT	ESPN+	W 45–10	25,915
September 12	1:00 p.m.	Utah Tech (Note: The game against Utah Tech, a fellow member of the Big Sky Conference, is a non-conference game and does not count in the league standings.)*	No. 3	Washington–Grizzly Stadium; Missoula, MT	ESPN+	W 35–14	25,418
September 19	9:00 p.m.	at Oregon State*	No. 3	Reser Stadium; Corvallis, OR	USA	L 17–52	34,030
September 26	8:00 p.m.	at No. 10 UC Davis	No. 5	UC Davis Health Stadium; Davis, CA	ESPN+	W 62–22	11,238
October 3	2:00 p.m.	Northern Colorado^{†}	No. 3	Washington–Grizzly Stadium; Missoula, MT	ESPN+	W 36–14	27,131
October 10	3:00 p.m.	at No. 13 Northern Arizona	No. 2	Walkup Skydome; Flagstaff, AZ	ESPN+	L 44–49	8,413
October 17	1:00 p.m.	Idaho	No. 7	Washington–Grizzly Stadium; Missoula, MT (Little Brown Stein)	ESPN+	L 35–42	26,567
October 31	2:00 p.m.	at Eastern Washington	No. 14	Roos Field; Cheney, WA (EWU–UM Governors Cup)	ESPN+	W 42–33	4,900
November 7	1:00 p.m.	Portland State	No. 12	Washington–Grizzly Stadium; Missoula, MT	ESPN+	W 57–24	25,079
November 14	8:30 p.m.	No. 21 Idaho State	No. 12	Washington–Grizzly Stadium; Missoula, MT	ESPN2	W 38–30	5,319
November 21	12:00 p.m.	at No. 2 Montana State	No. 8	Bobcat Stadium; Bozeman, MT (rivalry)	ESPN+	L 16–42	22,277
*Non-conference game; ^{†}Homecoming; Rankings from STATS Poll released prior to the game; All times are in Mountain time

== Game summaries ==
=== Southern Utah ===
Southern Utah Thunderbirds (0–0) at No. 2 Montana Grizzlies (0–0) – Game summary

Quarter	1	2	3	4	Total
Thunderbirds	0	3	6	12	21
No. 2 Grizzlies	7	7	7	7	28

at Washington–Grizzly Stadium • Missoula, Montana

- Date: August 29
- Game time: 7:00 p.m.
- Game weather: Cloudy • Temperature: 72 °F (22 °C) • Wind: E at 10 miles per hour (16 km/h)
- Game attendance: 26,829
- Referee: Justin Robinson
- TV announcers (ESPN+): Trey Bender, Jordan Tripp and Kyle Hansen

Game information

First quarter

- MONT – Eli Gillman 85-yard pass from Keali'i Ah Yat (Jo Silver kick), 13:42. Grizzlies 7–0. Drive: 1 play, 85 yards, 0:14.

Second quarter

- SUU – Jayden Rogers 50-yard field goal, 13:27. Grizzlies 7–3. Drive: 12 plays, 61 yards, 7:14.
- MONT – Eli Gillman 29-yard run (Jo Silver kick), 11:50. Grizzlies 14–3. Drive: 6 plays, 75 yards, 1:37.

Third quarter

- SUU – Floyd Chalk IV 6-yard run (run failed), 10:09. Grizzlies 14–9. Drive: 8 plays, 75 yards, 4:51.
- MONT – Keali'i Ah Yat 3-yard run (Jo Silver kick), 8:48. Grizzlies 21–9. Drive: 4 plays, 34 yards, 1:30.

Fourth quarter

- SUU – Joshua Acord 13-yard pass from Will Burns (run failed), 14:56. Grizzlies 21–15. Drive: 14 plays, 75 yards, 8:52.
- SUU – Joshua Acord 58-yard pass from Will Burns (Jayden Rogers kick BLOCKED), 11:41. Tied 21–21. Drive: 4 plays, 71 yards, 1:41.
- MONT – Lekeldrick Bridges 53-yard pass from Keali'i Ah Yat (Jo Silver kick), 3:14. Grizzlies 28–21. Drive: 5 plays, 80 yards, 2:17.

Statistics	SUU	MONT
First downs	31	14
Plays–yards	83–510	46–337
Rushes–yards	49–259	18–73
Passing yards	251	264
Passing: comp–att–int	24–34–1	15–28–1
Turnovers	1	2
Time of possession	43:34	16:26

Team	Category	Player	Statistics
Southern Utah	Passing	Will Burns	24/34, 251 yards, 2 TD, INT
Southern Utah	Rushing	Will Burns	15 carries, 119 yards
Southern Utah	Receiving	Joshua Acord	6 receptions, 86 yards, 2 TD
Montana	Passing	Keali'i Ah Yat	15/28, 264 yards, 2 TD, INT
Montana	Rushing	Eli Gillman	13 carries, 76 yards, TD
Montana	Receiving	Eli Gillman	2 receptions, 93 yards, TD

=== Drake ===
Drake Bulldogs (0–1) at No. 3 Montana Grizzlies (1–0) – Game summary

Quarter	1	2	3	4	Total
Bulldogs	3	0	0	7	10
No. 3 Grizzlies	14	7	14	10	45

at Washington–Grizzly Stadium • Missoula, Montana

- Date: September 5
- Game time: 7:00 p.m.
- Game weather: Sunny • Temperature: 68 °F (20 °C) • Wind: E at 10 miles per hour (16 km/h)
- Game attendance: 25,915
- Referee: Mike Bezner
- TV: ESPN+

Game information

First quarter

- DRKE – Griffin Kollhoff 22-yard field goal, 12:09. Bulldogs 3–0. Drive: 7 plays, 65 yards, 1:37.
- MONT – Eli Gillman 3-yard run (Jo Silver kick), 7:00. Grizzlies 7–3. Drive: 13 plays, 75 yards, 5:09.
- MONT – Eli Gillman 3-yard run (Jo Silver kick), 2:11. Grizzlies 14–3. Drive: 6 plays, 39 yards, 2:50.

Second quarter

- MONT – Eli Gillman 1-yard run (Jo Silver kick), 7:19. Grizzlies 21–3. Drive: 10 plays, 81 yards, 4:08.

Third quarter

- MONT – Eli Gillman 1-yard pass from Keali'i Ah Yat (Jo Silver kick), 4:01. Grizzlies 28—3. Drive: 7 plays, 39 yards, 3:06.
- MONT – Brooks Davis 26-yard pass from Keali'i Ah Yat (Jo Silver kick), 0:53. Grizzlies 35–3. Drive: 3 plays, 36 yards, 1:12.

Fourth quarter

- DRKE – Kavaughn Clark 10-yard pass from Riley Warzynski (Griffin Kollhoff kick), 9:30. Grizzlies 35–10. Drive: 7 plays, 63 yards, 2:03.
- MONT – Jo Silver 50-yard field goal, 4:05. Grizzlies 38–10. Drive: 10 plays, 37 yards, 5:23.
- MONT – Dylan Paine 1-yard run (Jo Silver kick), 1:27. Grizzlies 45–10. Drive: 5 plays, 30 yards, 2:02.

Statistics	DRKE	MONT
First downs	24	26
Plays–yards	85–297	83–488
Rushes–yards	21–45	42–206
Passing yards	252	282
Passing: comp–att–int	31–64–0	27–41–0
Turnovers	2	0
Time of possession	27:00	33:00

Team	Category	Player	Statistics
Drake	Passing	Riley Warzynski	31/60, 252 yards, TD
Drake	Rushing	Chase Spellman	5 carries, 20 yards
Drake	Receiving	Willis Nofsinger	6 receptions, 89 yards
Montana	Passing	Keali'i Ah Yat	27/40, 282 yards, 2 TD
Montana	Rushing	Eli Gillman	19 carries, 105 yards, 3 TD
Montana	Receiving	Landon Ransom-Goelz	5 receptions, 101 yards

=== Utah Tech ===
Utah Tech Trailblazers (0–2) at No. 3 Montana Grizzlies (2–0) – Game summary

Quarter	1	2	3	4	Total
Trailblazers	0	0	0	14	14
No. 3 Grizzlies	7	14	0	14	35

at Washington–Grizzly Stadium • Missoula, Montana

- Date: September 12
- Game time: 1:00 p.m.
- Game weather: Sunny • Temperature: 65 °F (18 °C) • Wind: NE at 10 miles per hour (16 km/h)
- Game attendance: 25,418
- Referee: Spencer Mumford
- TV announcers (ESPN+): Trey Bender (play-by-play), Jordan Tripp (analyst) and Kyle Hansen (sideline)

Game information

First quarter

- (10:01) MONT – Eli Gillman 1-yard run, Jo Silver kick (Drive: 5 plays, 61 yards, 2:16; Montana 7–0)

Second quarter

- (14:57) MONT – Eli Gillman 1-yard run, Jo Silver kick (Drive: 9 plays, 32 yards, 4:27; Montana 14–0)
- (0:52) MONT – Lekeldrick Bridges 15-yard pass from Keali'i Ah Yat, Jo Silver kick (Drive: 5 plays, 72 yards, 0:57; Montana 21–0)

Third quarter

No scoring plays

Fourth quarter

- (8:37) MONT – Eli Gillman 75-yard run, Jo Silver kick (Drive: 1 play, 66 yards, 0:33; Montana 28–0)
- (6:38) UTU – Bronson Barben 1-yard run, Dax Iverson kick (Drive: 6 plays, 75 yards, 1:59; Montana 28–7)
- (6:20) MONT – Dylan Paine 57-yard run, Jo Silver kick (Drive: 1 play, 57 yards, 0:11; Montana 35–7)
- (3:23) UTU – Mike Williams 60-yard pass from Bronson Barben, Dax Iverson kick (Drive: 2 plays, 75 yards, 0:35; Montana 35–14)

Statistics	UTU	MONT
First downs	20	20
Plays–yards	68–405	66–462
Rushes–yards	33–104	29–216
Passing yards	301	246
Passing: comp–att–int	21–35–0	25–37–0
Turnovers	2	0
Time of possession	32:21	27:39

Team	Category	Player	Statistics
Utah Tech	Passing	Bronson Barben	21/35, 301 yards, TD
Utah Tech	Rushing	Ace Chatman	21 carries, 95 yards
Utah Tech	Receiving	Mike Williams	3 receptions, 80 yards, TD
Montana	Passing	Keali'i Ah Yat	25/35, 246 yards, TD
Montana	Rushing	Eli Gillman	17 carries, 147 yards, 3 TD
Montana	Receiving	Brooks Davis	12 receptions, 151 yards

=== at Oregon State (FBS) ===
No. 3 Montana Grizzlies (3–0) at Oregon State Beavers (FBS) (0–2) – Game summary

Quarter	1	2	3	4	Total
No. 3 Grizzlies	0	3	7	7	17
Beavers (FBS)	14	21	7	10	52

at Reser Stadium • Corvallis, Oregon

- Date: September 19
- Game time: 9:00 p.m.
- Game weather: Clear • Temperature: 64 °F (18 °C) • Wind: NW 5 mph
- Game attendance: 34,030
- Referee: Chris Snead
- TV announcers (USA): Ted Robinson, Darius Walker and Dalen Cuff

Game information

First quarter

- ORST - Eric Olsen 19-yard pass from Braden Atkinson (Caleb Ojeda kick), 11:24. Beavers 7-0. Drive: 5 plays, 67 yards, 2:22.
- ORST - Aeryn Hampton 21-yard pass from Braden Atkinson (Caleb Ojeda kick), 4:48. Beavers 14-0. Drive: 6 plays, 67 yards, 3:09.

Second quarter

- MONT - Jo Silver 39-yard field goal, 11:55. Beavers 14-3. Drive: 9 plays, 27 yards, 3:50.
- ORST - Jesse Legree 23-yard pass from Braden Atkinson (Caleb Ojeda kick), 8:42. Beavers 21-3. Drive: 7 plays, 90 yards, 3:09.
- ORST - DeCorion Temple 11-yard pass from Braden Atkinson (Caleb Ojeda kick), 5:17. Beavers 28-3. Drive: 7 plays, 33 yards, 2:43.
- ORST - Braden Atkinson 1-yard run (Caleb Ojeda kick), 0:07. Beavers 35-3. Drive: 11 plays, 84 yards, 1:36.

Third quarter

- ORST - Aaron Butler 27-yard pass from Braden Atkinson (Caleb Ojeda kick), 14:19. Beavers 42-3. Drive: 3 plays, 75 yards, 0:41.
- MONT - Reese Brooks 2-yard pass from Keali'i Ah Yat (Jo Silver kick), 2:05. Beavers 42-10. Drive: 12 plays, 72 yards, 5:30.

Fourth quarter

- ORST - Cornell Hatcher Jr. 14-yard run (Caleb Ojeda kick), 11:26. Beavers 49-10. Drive: 11 plays, 81 yards, 5:33.
- MONT - Brooks Davis 40-yard pass from Keali'i Ah Yat (Jo Silver kick), 8:53. Beavers 49-17. Drive: 6 plays, 75 yards, 2:33.
- ORST - Caleb Ojeda 22-yard field goal, 2:24. Beavers 52-17. Drive: 4 plays, 7 yards, 2:13.

Statistics	MONT	ORST
First downs	22	28
Plays–yards	72–338	68–508
Rushes–yards	27–96	32–144
Passing yards	242	366
Passing: comp–att–int	30–45–1	26–36–0
Turnovers	2	1
Time of possession	30:53	29:07

Team	Category	Player	Statistics
Montana	Passing	Keali'i Ah Yat	27/40, 215 yards, 2 TD
Montana	Rushing	Eli Gillman	18 carries, 81 yards
Montana	Receiving	Brooks Davis	11 receptions, 135 yards, TD
Oregon State	Passing	Braden Atkinson	22/30, 333 yards, 5 TD
Oregon State	Rushing	Tre Garrison	14 carries, 56 yards
Oregon State	Receiving	Jesse Legree	4 receptions, 100 yards, TD

=== at No. 10 UC Davis ===
No. 5 Montana Grizzlies (3–1) at No. 10 UC Davis Aggies (3–1) – Game summary

Quarter	1	2	3	4	Total
No. 5 Grizzlies	0	0	0	0	0
No. 10 Aggies	0	0	0	0	0

at UC Davis Health Stadium • Davis, California

- Date: September 26
- Game time: 8:00 p.m.
- TV: ESPN+

Game information

First quarter
Second quarter
Third quarter
Fourth quarter

Statistics	MONT	UCD
First downs		
Plays–yards		
Rushes–yards		
Passing yards		
Passing: comp–att–int		
Turnovers		
Time of possession		

Team	Category	Player	Statistics
Montana	Passing		
Montana	Rushing		
Montana	Receiving		
UC Davis	Passing		
UC Davis	Rushing		
UC Davis	Receiving		

=== Northern Colorado ===
Northern Colorado Bears (2–3) at No. 3 Montana Grizzlies (4–1) – Game summary

Quarter	1	2	3	4	Total
Bears	0	0	0	0	0
No. 3 Grizzlies	0	0	0	0	0

at Washington–Grizzly Stadium • Missoula, Montana

- Date: October 3
- Game time: 2:00 p.m.

Game information

First quarter
Second quarter
Third quarter
Fourth quarter

Statistics	UNCO	MONT
First downs		
Plays–yards		
Rushes–yards		
Passing yards		
Passing: comp–att–int		
Turnovers		
Time of possession		

Team	Category	Player	Statistics
Northern Colorado	Passing		
Northern Colorado	Rushing		
Northern Colorado	Receiving		
Montana	Passing		
Montana	Rushing		
Montana	Receiving		

=== at No. 13 Northern Arizona ===
No. 2 Montana Grizzlies (5–1) at No. 13 Northern Arizona Lumberjacks (4–2) – Game summary

Quarter	1	2	3	4	Total
No. 2 Grizzlies	0	0	0	0	0
No. 13 Lumberjacks	0	0	0	0	0

at Walkup Skydome • Flagstaff, Arizona

- Date: October 10
- Game time: 3:00 p.m.

Game information

First quarter
Second quarter
Third quarter
Fourth quarter

Statistics	MONT	NAU
First downs		
Plays–yards		
Rushes–yards		
Passing yards		
Passing: comp–att–int		
Turnovers		
Time of possession		

Team	Category	Player	Statistics
Montana	Passing		
Montana	Rushing		
Montana	Receiving		
Northern Arizona	Passing		
Northern Arizona	Rushing		
Northern Arizona	Receiving		

=== Idaho (Little Brown Stein) ===
Idaho Vandals (1–5) at No. 7 Montana Grizzlies (5–2) – Game summary

Quarter	1	2	3	4	Total
Vandals	14	7	14	7	42
No. 7 Grizzlies	0	14	14	7	35

at Washington–Grizzly Stadium • Missoula, Montana

- Date: October 17
- Game time: 1:00 p.m.
- Game weather: Sunny
- Game attendance: 26,567
- Referee: Gregg Wilson
- TV: ESPN+

Game information

First quarter

- IDHO – Zack Card 10-yard pass from Joshua Wood (Owen Forsman kick), 10:05. Idaho 7–0. Drive: 7 plays, 39 yards, 3:40.
- IDHO – Ryan Jezioro 14-yard pass from Joshua Wood (Owen Forsman kick), 1:35. Idaho 14–0. Drive: 11 plays, 88 yards, 6:08.

Second quarter

- UM – Brooks Davis 18-yard pass from Keali'i Ah Yat (Jo Silver kick), 13:39. Montana 7–14. Drive: 7 plays, 75 yards, 2:56.
- IDHO – Joshua Wood 2-yard run (Owen Forsman kick), 6:21. Idaho 21–7. Drive: 14 plays, 76 yards, 7:12.
- UM – Brooks Davis 5-yard pass from Keali'i Ah Yat (Jo Silver kick), 1:05. Montana 14–21. Drive: 12 plays, 74 yards, 5:08.

Third quarter

- UM – Brooks Davis 33-yard pass from Keali'i Ah Yat (Jo Silver kick), 12:23. Montana 21–21. Drive: 5 plays, 75 yards, 2:37.
- IDHO – Ryan Jezioro 13-yard pass from Joshua Wood (Owen Forsman kick), 7:37. Idaho 28–21. Drive: 10 plays, 75 yards, 4:46.
- UM – Landon Ransom-Goelz 22-yard pass from Keali'i Ah Yat (Jo Silver kick), 5:57. Montana 28–28. Drive: 4 plays, 65 yards, 1:30.
- IDHO – Hayden Kincheloe 6-yard run (Owen Forsman kick), 0:10. Idaho 35–28. Drive: 12 plays, 73 yards, 5:41.

Fourth quarter

- UM – Eli Gillman 3-yard pass from Keali'i Ah Yat (Jo Silver kick), 11:53. Montana 35–35. Drive: 9 plays, 75 yards, 3:17.
- IDHO – Israel Carter 2-yard run (Owen Forsman kick), 10:07. Idaho 42–35. Drive: 4 plays, 75 yards, 1:46.

Statistics	IDHO	MONT
First downs	32	24
Plays–yards	74–493	59–481
Rushes–yards	36–158	28–143
Passing yards	335	338
Passing: comp–att–int	30–38–1	25–31–0
Turnovers	1	1
Time of possession	35:43	24:17

Team	Category	Player	Statistics
Idaho	Passing	Joshua Wood	30/38, 335 yards, 3 TD, INT
Idaho	Rushing	Joshua Wood	11 carries, 85 yards, TD
Idaho	Receiving	Tony Harste	5 receptions, 61 yards
Montana	Passing	Keali'i Ah Yat	25/31, 338 yards, 5 TD
Montana	Rushing	Eli Gillman	19 carries, 139 yards
Montana	Receiving	Brooks Davis	8 receptions, 104 yards, 3 TD

=== at Eastern Washington (EWU–UM Governors Cup) ===
No. 14 Montana Grizzlies (5–3) at Eastern Washington Eagles (2–6) – Game summary

Quarter	1	2	3	4	Total
No. 14 Grizzlies	0	0	0	0	0
Eagles	0	0	0	0	0

at Roos Field • Cheney, Washington

- Date: October 31
- Game time: 2:00 p.m.

Game information

First quarter
Second quarter
Third quarter
Fourth quarter

Statistics	MONT	EWU
First downs		
Plays–yards		
Rushes–yards		
Passing yards		
Passing: comp–att–int		
Turnovers		
Time of possession		

Team	Category	Player	Statistics
Montana	Passing		
Montana	Rushing		
Montana	Receiving		
Eastern Washington	Passing		
Eastern Washington	Rushing		
Eastern Washington	Receiving		

=== Portland State ===
Portland State Vikings (2–7) at No. 12 Montana Grizzlies (6–3) – Game summary

Quarter	1	2	3	4	Total
Vikings	0	0	0	0	0
No. 12 Grizzlies	0	0	0	0	0

at Washington–Grizzly Stadium • Missoula, Montana

- Date: November 7
- Game time: 1:00 p.m.

Game information

First quarter
Second quarter
Third quarter
Fourth quarter

Statistics	PRST	MONT
First downs		
Plays–yards		
Rushes–yards		
Passing yards		
Passing: comp–att–int		
Turnovers		
Time of possession		

Team	Category	Player	Statistics
Portland State	Passing		
Portland State	Rushing		
Portland State	Receiving		
Montana	Passing		
Montana	Rushing		
Montana	Receiving		

=== No. 21 Idaho State ===
No. 21 Idaho State Bengals (6–4) at No. 12 Montana Grizzlies (7–3) – Game summary

Quarter	1	2	3	4	Total
No. 21 Bengals	0	0	0	0	0
No. 12 Grizzlies	0	0	0	0	0

at Washington–Grizzly Stadium • Missoula, Montana

- Date: November 14
- Game time: 8:30 p.m.

Game information

First quarter
Second quarter
Third quarter
Fourth quarter

Statistics	IDST	MONT
First downs		
Plays–yards		
Rushes–yards		
Passing yards		
Passing: comp–att–int		
Turnovers		
Time of possession		

Team	Category	Player	Statistics
Idaho State	Passing		
Idaho State	Rushing		
Idaho State	Receiving		
Montana	Passing		
Montana	Rushing		
Montana	Receiving		

=== at No. 2 Montana State (Brawl of the Wild) ===
No. 8 Montana Grizzlies (8–3) at No. 2 Montana State Bobcats (10–1) – Game summary

Quarter	1	2	3	4	Total
No. 8 Grizzlies	0	0	0	0	0
No. 2 Bobcats	0	0	0	0	0

at Bobcat Stadium • Bozeman, Montana

- Date: November 21
- Game time: 12:00 p.m.

Game information

First quarter
Second quarter
Third quarter
Fourth quarter

Statistics	MONT	MTST
First downs		
Plays–yards		
Rushes–yards		
Passing yards		
Passing: comp–att–int		
Turnovers		
Time of possession		

Team	Category	Player	Statistics
Montana	Passing		
Montana	Rushing		
Montana	Receiving		
Montana State	Passing		
Montana State	Rushing		
Montana State	Receiving		

== Rankings ==
Ranking movements Legend: ██ Increase in ranking ██ Decrease in ranking т = Tied with team above or below ( ) = First-place votes
	Week														
Poll	Pre	1	2	3	4	5	6	7	8	9	10	11	12	13	Final
STATS	2	3	3	3	5	3	2 (3)	7	14	14	12	12	8		
Coaches	2	3	2	2	4т	4	3 (1)	7	14	14	13	12т	9		
