= SWX =

SWX may refer to:

- SIX Swiss Exchange (SWX Swiss Exchange) Zurich, Switzerland stock exchange (SWX)
  - SWX Europe, crossborder trading platform
  - SWX Group, conglomerate behind the SWX stock exchange
- SWX Right Now, sports TV channel for varsity and collegiate sports
- .swx, file format and file extension for Adobe Flash
- Shakawe Airport (IATA airport code: SWX, ICAO airport code: FBSW) airport in Shakawe, Botswana
- Swazi Express Airways (IATA airline code: Q4, ICAO airline code: SWX) defunct airline of Swaziland
- Zuruahá language (ISO 639 language code: swx) Suruahá
- Saidanwala rail station (rail code: SWX) see Ludhiana–Fazilka line
- Southwest Gas (NYSE stock ticker: SWX) Las Vegas natural gas utility company
