= List of current NCAA Division I FCS football coaches =

The National Collegiate Athletic Association (NCAA) Division I Football Championship Subdivision (I FCS) includes 128 teams. Each team has one head coach. As of the upcoming 2026 season, Division I FCS is composed of 13 conferences: the Big Sky Conference, CAA Football, Ivy League, Mid-Eastern Athletic Conference (MEAC), Missouri Valley Football Conference (MVFC), Northeast Conference (officially named NEC), OVC–Big South Football Association, Patriot League, Pioneer Football League, Southern Conference (Southern, or SoCon), Southland Conference, Southwestern Athletic Conference (SWAC), and United Athletic Conference (UAC).

The two newest conferences—both of which were officially considered by the NCAA to be alliances between all-sports conferences instead of conferences in their own right through the 2025 season—are the OVC–Big South and UAC, each of which started play in 2023. The former combined most of the football membership of the Big South Conference and Ohio Valley Conference. The latter was a merger of the preexisting football leagues of the Atlantic Sun Conference (ASUN) and Western Athletic Conference (WAC), replacing a football alliance between the two conferences. Due to an NCAA moratorium on the establishment of new single-sport conferences, that organization denied a request by the UAC to be considered as an official conference. However, the UAC became an official multi-sport conference in July 2026 via a rebranding of the WAC. The initial all-sports UAC membership includes two football-sponsoring legacy WAC members; all five legacy ASUN members that play scholarship FCS football; (Note: Two legacy ASUN members play football, but did not join the UAC. Stetson plays non-scholarship football in the Pioneer League. Bellarmine plays the weight-restricted and non-NCAA variant of sprint football.) and two non-football schools (one a legacy WAC member).

In the 2025 season, all schools except Merrimack and Sacred Heart were members of one of these conferences. Both Merrimack and Sacred Heart moved from the football-sponsoring Northeast Conference to the non-football-sponsoring Metro Atlantic Athletic Conference in 2024, leaving their football programs to compete as independents. Sacred Heart joined CAA Football for the 2026 season, while one other program is independent in the same season. Chicago State, a full NEC member, launched its FCS program in 2026, playing that season as an independent before joining NEC football in 2027.

As of the upcoming 2026 season, the longest-tenured coach in Division I FCS is expected to be Jerry Schmitt of Duquesne, who has been head coach at Duquesne since being hired in 2005. In all, 23 FCS programs have new head coaches in 2026.

Conference affiliations are current for the upcoming 2026 season. Coaches records are updated through 3pm, Wednesday, September 16th, 2026.

== Coaches ==
| Team | Conference | Head coach | First season | W | L | W% | W | L | W% | Offensive coordinator(s) | Defensive coordinator(s) | Special teams coordinator(s) |
| | | | | Current | | | Career | | | | | |
|---|---|---|---|---|---|---|---|---|---|---|---|---|
| Cal Poly Mustangs | Big Sky | Tim Skipper | 2026 | 2 | 1 | .667 | 12 | 14 | .462 | Anthony Soto | Sammy Lawanson | Eric Brown |
| Eastern Washington Eagles | Big Sky | Aaron Best | 2017 | 58 | 49 | .542 | 58 | 49 | .542 | Marc Anderson | Zach Bruce / Caleb Padilla | Austin York |
| Idaho Vandals | Big Sky | Thomas Ford | 2025 | 4 | 11 | .267 | 6 | 29 | .171 | Ian Shoemaker | Lee Stalker | Joe Begnal |
| Idaho State Bengals | Big Sky | Cody Hawkins | 2023 | 17 | 21 | .447 | 17 | 21 | .447 | Buddy Blevins / John Hughes | Grant Duff | Scott Thiessen |
| Montana Grizzlies | Big Sky | Bobby Kennedy | 2026 | 3 | 0 | 1.000 | 3 | 0 | 1.000 | Brent Pease | Eric Sanders | Vacant |
| Montana State Bobcats | Big Sky | Brent Vigen | 2021 | 64 | 12 | .842 | 64 | 12 | .842 | Pete Sterbick | Bobby Daly | Marcus Monaco |
| Northern Arizona Lumberjacks | Big Sky | Brian Wright | 2024 | 17 | 11 | .607 | 54 | 19 | .740 | Bryan Larson | Trenton Greene | Aman Anand |
| Northern Colorado Bears | Big Sky | Ed Lamb | 2023 | 5 | 33 | .132 | 50 | 80 | .385 | Justin Walterscheid | Preston Hadley | Spencer Patterson |
| Portland State Vikings | Big Sky | Chris Fisk | 2026 | 0 | 3 | .000 | 48 | 25 | .658 | Matt Adkins | Grant Torgerson | Jared Gallatin |
| Southern Utah Thunderbirds | Big Sky | DeLane Fitzgerald | 2022 | 26 | 23 | .531 | 112 | 72 | .609 | DeLane Fitzgerald | Shay McClure | Jack Nelson |
| UC Davis Aggies | Big Sky | Tim Plough | 2024 | 22 | 8 | .733 | 22 | 8 | .733 | Paul Shelton | Matt Coombs | Cody vonAppen |
| Utah Tech Trailblazers | Big Sky | Lance Anderson | 2024 | 3 | 24 | .111 | 3 | 24 | .111 | Greg Stevens | Patrick Moynahan | Kyan Brumfield |
| Weber State Wildcats | Big Sky | Eric Kjar | 2026 | 1 | 2 | .333 | 1 | 2 | .333 | Eric Kjar | Gavin Fowler | Tanner Jacobson |
| Albany Great Danes | CAA Football | Tom Perkovich | 2026 | 2 | 1 | .667 | 85 | 26 | .766 | Mike Wiand | Matt Scott | Keith Larson |
| Bryant Bulldogs | CAA Football | Chris Merritt | 2019 | 30 | 46 | .395 | 30 | 46 | .395 | Ben McKaig | Anthony Barese | John Sielawa |
| Campbell Fighting Camels | CAA Football | Braxton Harris | 2024 | 7 | 20 | .259 | 19 | 48 | .284 | Matt Kubik | Brandon Butcher | Koy McFarland |
| Elon Phoenix | CAA Football | Tony Trisciani | 2019 | 40 | 38 | .513 | 40 | 38 | .513 | Doug Martin | Casey Vance | Mike Nall |
| Hampton Pirates | CAA Football | Van Malone | 2026 | 1 | 2 | .333 | 1 | 2 | .333 | DJ Boldin | Clay Jennings | Dwyan Luckey |
| Maine Black Bears | CAA Football | Jordan Stevens | 2022 | 16 | 33 | .327 | 16 | 33 | .327 | Mikahael Waters | Umberto Di Meo | Spencer Carey |
| Monmouth Hawks | CAA Football | Jeff Gallo | 2026 | 1 | 2 | .333 | 1 | 2 | .333 | Jimmy Robertson | Louis DiRienzo | Dennis Long |
| New Hampshire Wildcats | CAA Football | Sean Goldrich | 2026 | 1 | 2 | .333 | 1 | 2 | .333 | Gage Hayes | Nic Keene | Tom Manley |
| North Carolina A&T Aggies | CAA Football | Shawn Gibbs | 2025 | 2 | 13 | .133 | 24 | 22 | .522 | Greg McGhee | Denzel Jones | Terry Lantz |
| Rhode Island Rams | CAA Football | Jim Fleming | 2014 | 61 | 74 | .452 | 82 | 75 | .522 | Mike Flanagan | Chris Lorenti | Troy Gilmer |
| Sacred Heart Pioneers | CAA Football | Mark Nofri | 2012 | 82 | 74 | .526 | 82 | 74 | .526 | Matt Gardner | Darin Edwards | Pat Saporito |
| Stony Brook Seawolves | CAA Football | Billy Cosh | 2024 | 15 | 12 | .556 | 15 | 12 | .556 | Anthony Davis | Scott Lewis | Kevin Elliott |
| Towson Tigers | CAA Football | Pete Shinnick | 2023 | 18 | 20 | .474 | 177 | 87 | .670 | Adam Neugebauer | Darian Dulin | Victor Santa Cruz |
| Chicago State Cougars | Independent | Bobby Rome II (Note: Rome was hired in April 2025.) | 2026 | 1 | 2 | .333 | 20 | 38 | .345 | Bobby Blizzard | Le'Marcus Gibson | Jakyl Ramsey |
| Merrimack Warriors | Independent | Mike Gennetti | 2024 | 10 | 16 | .385 | 10 | 16 | .385 | Aynsley Rosenbaum | Mike Gennetti / Gee White | Gordon Winicov |
| Brown Bears | Ivy | James Perry | 2019 | 20 | 40 | .333 | 32 | 50 | .390 | Eddy Morrissey | Dan Mulrooney | Patrick Murphy |
| Columbia Lions | Ivy | Jon Poppe | 2024 | 9 | 11 | .450 | 19 | 13 | .594 | Seitu Smith | Ryan Osborn | Hayden McDonald |
| Cornell Big Red | Ivy | Dan Swanstrom | 2024 | 8 | 12 | .400 | 40 | 23 | .635 | Mike Hatcher / Sean Reeder | Michael Toerper | Jeff Dittman |
| Dartmouth Big Green | Ivy | Sammy McCorkle | 2023 | 21 | 9 | .700 | 21 | 9 | .700 | Shane Montgomery | Jordan Belfiori | Vacant |
| Harvard Crimson | Ivy | Andrew Aurich | 2024 | 17 | 4 | .810 | 17 | 4 | .810 | Mickey Fein | Scott Larkee | Steven Williams |
| Penn Quakers | Ivy | Ricky Santos | 2026 | 0 | 0 | – | 36 | 24 | .600 | Ed Borden / Ryan Wilson | Jayson Thompson / Nick Della Jacono | Justin Stovall |
| Princeton Tigers | Ivy | Bob Surace | 2010 | 84 | 66 | .560 | 102 | 69 | .596 | Mark Rosenbaum | Steve Verbit / EJ Henderson / Matt Weick | John Sibel |
| Yale Bulldogs | Ivy | Kevin Cahill | 2026 | 0 | 0 | – | 23 | 14 | .622 | Chris Ostrowsky | Sean McGowan | Steven Vashel |
| Delaware State Hornets | MEAC | DeSean Jackson | 2025 | 10 | 5 | .667 | 10 | 5 | .667 | Nemo Washington | Brandon Blackmon | DJ Taylor |
| Howard Bison | MEAC | Ted White | 2026 | 1 | 2 | .333 | 1 | 2 | .333 | Jimmie Johnson | Kyshoen Jarrett | Keith Burns |
| Morgan State Bears | MEAC | Damon Wilson | 2022 | 20 | 28 | .417 | 109 | 73 | .599 | Apollo Wright | Antone' Sewell | Benton Harold |
| Norfolk State Spartans | MEAC | Michael Vick | 2025 | 2 | 13 | .133 | 2 | 13 | .133 | Brian Sheppard | Terence Garvin | LaRoy Reynolds |
| North Carolina Central Eagles | MEAC | Trei Oliver | 2019 | 47 | 26 | .644 | 47 | 26 | .644 | Chris Barnette | Tommy Thigpen | Charles Bankins |
| South Carolina State Bulldogs | MEAC | Chennis Berry | 2024 | 22 | 6 | .786 | 49 | 13 | .790 | KJ Black / Jason Onyebuagu | Jordan Odaffer | Kevin King |
| Illinois State Redbirds | MVFC | Brock Spack | 2009 | 126 | 79 | .615 | 126 | 79 | .615 | Mickey Turner | Travis Niekamp | Kye Stewart |
| Indiana State Sycamores | MVFC | Curt Mallory | 2017 | 28 | 66 | .298 | 28 | 66 | .298 | John Bear | Steve Morrison | Joseph Seymour |
| Murray State Racers | MVFC | Jody Wright | 2024 | 3 | 24 | .111 | 3 | 24 | .111 | Jimmy Ogle / Jack Walker | Kirk Botkin | Josh Lawrence |
| North Dakota Fighting Hawks | MVFC | Eric Schmidt | 2025 | 11 | 6 | .647 | 11 | 6 | .647 | Danny Freund | Eric Schmidt | Shawn Kostich |
| Northern Iowa Panthers | MVFC | Todd Stepsis | 2025 | 4 | 10 | .286 | 33 | 42 | .440 | Nate Thompson | Al Smith | Michael McCourt |
| South Dakota Coyotes | MVFC | Matt Vitzthum | 2026 | 3 | 0 | 1.000 | 3 | 0 | 1.000 | Tim Morrison | Billy Kirch | Kyle Taylor |
| South Dakota State Jackrabbits | MVFC | Dan Jackson | 2025 | 11 | 6 | .647 | 11 | 6 | .647 | Eric Eidsness | Brian Bergstrom | Isaiah Jackson |
| Southern Illinois Salukis | MVFC | Nick Hill | 2016 | 57 | 62 | .479 | 57 | 62 | .479 | Ryan McVicker | Lee Pronschinske | Nathan Frame |
| Youngstown State Penguins | MVFC | Doug Phillips | 2020 | 33 | 36 | .478 | 33 | 36 | .478 | Mike Yurcich | Ryan Riemedio | Thomas Fletcher |
| Central Connecticut Blue Devils | NEC | Adam Lechtenberg | 2023 | 18 | 21 | .462 | 18 | 21 | .462 | Caleb Gelsomino | Ron DiGravio | Jermetrius Troy |
| Duquesne Dukes | NEC | Jerry Schmitt | 2005 | 135 | 94 | .590 | 163 | 115 | .586 | Anthony Doria | Bill Nesselt | Vacant |
| LIU Sharks | NEC | Ron Cooper | 2022 | 18 | 31 | .367 | 66 | 90 | .423 | Kort Shankweiler | TyQuan Hammock | Ryan Jirgl |
| Mercyhurst Lakers | NEC | Thomas Sydeski | 2026 | 0 | 3 | .000 | 0 | 3 | .000 | Thomas Sydeski | Bryce Dempsey | Kellen O'Neill |
| New Haven Chargers | NEC | Mark Powell | 2025 | 6 | 7 | .462 | 6 | 7 | .462 | Brian Scott | Mark Powell | Michael Day |
| Robert Morris Colonials | NEC | Bernard Clark | 2018 | 29 | 56 | .341 | 29 | 56 | .341 | Troy Rothenbuhler | Marshall Cooper | Ty Aeschbacher |
| Stonehill Skyhawks | NEC | Eli Gardner | 2016 | 42 | 54 | .438 | 42 | 54 | .438 | Dan Hebert | Kyle Jones | Jerry Maher |
| Wagner Seahawks | NEC | Tom Masella | 2020 | 14 | 47 | .230 | 58 | 113 | .339 | Terence Sino | George Gaspar | Jim Munson |
| Charleston Southern Buccaneers | OVC–Big South | Gabe Giardina | 2023 | 11 | 27 | .289 | 48 | 44 | .522 | Seth Strickland | Randall McCray | Gabe Giardina |
| Eastern Illinois Panthers | OVC–Big South | Chris Wilkerson | 2022 | 17 | 32 | .347 | 68 | 59 | .535 | Kyle Derickson | Andrew Strobel | Mason Keeler |
| Gardner–Webb Runnin' Bulldogs | OVC–Big South | Pete Bennett | 2026 | 0 | 2 | .000 | 0 | 2 | .000 | Kenneth Hrncir / Brayle Brown | Jake Shaw / Andre Pope | Pete Bennett |
| Lindenwood Lions | OVC–Big South | Jed Stugart | 2017 | 48 | 46 | .511 | 139 | 70 | .665 | Dusty Hovorka | Eric Inama | Bryan Baldwin |
| Southeast Missouri State Redhawks | OVC–Big South | Tom Matukewicz | 2014 | 68 | 73 | .482 | 69 | 73 | .486 | Brendan Boylan | Ricky Coon | Chase Johnson |
| Tennessee State Tigers | OVC–Big South | Reggie Barlow | 2025 | 2 | 13 | .133 | 85 | 71 | .545 | Matt Leone | Cedric Thornton | Jerod Kruse |
| UT Martin Skyhawks | OVC–Big South | Jason Simpson | 2006 | 131 | 100 | .567 | 131 | 100 | .567 | Kevin Bannon | Rudy Griffin / TJ Jefferson | TJ Jefferson |
| Western Illinois Leathernecks | OVC–Big South | Joe Davis | 2024 | 9 | 18 | .333 | 9 | 18 | .333 | Brad Wilson | Landan Fox | Josh Caraway |
| Bucknell Bison | Patriot | Jeff Behrman | 2026 | 1 | 2 | .333 | 73 | 29 | .716 | Travis James | Jeff Long Jr. | McNeil Parker |
| Colgate Raiders | Patriot | Curt Fitzpatrick | 2025 | 7 | 8 | .467 | 87 | 51 | .630 | Joe Gerbino | Trevor Warner | Josh Ison |
| Fordham Rams | Patriot | Joe Conlin | 2018 | 32 | 55 | .368 | 32 | 55 | .368 | Art Asselta | James Lenahan | Vacant |
| Georgetown Hoyas | Patriot | Rob Sgarlata | 2014 | 41 | 81 | .336 | 41 | 81 | .336 | Jack McDaniels | Kevin Doherty | Trey Henderson |
| Holy Cross Crusaders | Patriot | Dan Curran | 2024 | 9 | 18 | .333 | 62 | 76 | .449 | Matt Schell | Bryan Robbat | Jimmy Walsh |
| Lafayette Leopards | Patriot | John Troxell | 2022 | 28 | 21 | .571 | 120 | 88 | .577 | T.J. DiMuzio | Mike Saint Germain | Kevin Baumann |
| Lehigh Mountain Hawks | Patriot | Rich Nagy | 2026 | 3 | 0 | 1.000 | 13 | 20 | .394 | Dan Hunt | Mike Kashurba | Chip Taylor |
| Richmond Spiders | Patriot | Russ Huesman | 2017 | 61 | 42 | .592 | 120 | 79 | .603 | Jacob Huesman / Mike Cummings | Justin Wood | Drew Anthony |
| Villanova Wildcats | Patriot | Mark Ferrante | 2017 | 70 | 38 | .648 | 70 | 38 | .648 | Chris Boden | Ross Pennypacker | Josh Fletcher |
| William & Mary Tribe | Patriot | Mike London | 2019 | 45 | 32 | .584 | 107 | 93 | .535 | Winston October | Ras-I Dowling / Bo Revell | Darryl Blackstock |
| Butler Bulldogs | Pioneer | Kevin Lynch | 2025 | 8 | 7 | .533 | 8 | 7 | .533 | Kevin Lynch | Jared Heck | Joe Cheshire |
| Davidson Wildcats | Pioneer | Saj Thakkar | 2025 | 3 | 12 | .200 | 17 | 18 | .486 | Keegan Kennedy | Woody Blevins | Pat McGowan |
| Dayton Flyers | Pioneer | Trevor Andrews | 2023 | 19 | 16 | .543 | 19 | 16 | .543 | Greg Whalen | John Bowes | Vacant |
| Drake Bulldogs | Pioneer | Matt Walker | 2026 | 0 | 3 | .000 | 89 | 91 | .494 | Joe Matheson | Mark Sipple | Bobby Cade Mornhinweg |
| Marist Red Foxes | Pioneer | Mike Willis | 2024 | 7 | 19 | .269 | 7 | 19 | .269 | TJ Weyl | Mike Horan | John Audino |
| Morehead State Eagles | Pioneer | Jason Woodman | 2024 | 14 | 13 | .519 | 74 | 60 | .552 | Jason Woodman | Wil Truelove | Laurence Treadaway |
| Presbyterian Blue Hose | Pioneer | Matt Rahl | 2026 | 1 | 1 | .500 | 1 | 1 | .500 | Mike Babcock | Mike Bruno | Chad Veccharella |
| St. Thomas Tommies | Pioneer | Glenn Caruso | 2008 | 166 | 40 | .806 | 172 | 52 | .768 | Jay MacIntyre | Wallie Kuchinski | Vacant |
| San Diego Toreros | Pioneer | Brandon Moore | 2023 | 20 | 16 | .556 | 33 | 19 | .635 | Matt Aponte | Mike McGlinchey / Isaac Carter | Louis Cortes |
| Stetson Hatters | Pioneer | Michael Jasper | 2025 | 4 | 11 | .267 | 48 | 31 | .608 | Jarod Dodson | Dustin Kincaid | Atif Austin |
| Valparaiso Beacons | Pioneer | Andy Waddle | 2025 | 3 | 11 | .214 | 58 | 72 | .446 | Reed Florence | Zach Feltrop | RJ Ghilarducci |
| Chattanooga Mocs | Southern | Rusty Wright | 2019 | 43 | 36 | .544 | 43 | 36 | .544 | Joe Pizzo | Mike Yeager | Wolfgang Shafer |
| The Citadel Bulldogs | Southern | Maurice Drayton | 2023 | 10 | 28 | .263 | 10 | 28 | .263 | Lamar Owens | Raleigh Jackson | Tony Coaxum |
| East Tennessee State Buccaneers | Southern | Will Healy | 2025 | 8 | 7 | .533 | 36 | 52 | .409 | Brian Blackmon | Chad Staggs | Vacant |
| Furman Paladins | Southern | Clay Hendrix | 2017 | 62 | 44 | .585 | 62 | 44 | .585 | Justin Roper | Chad Byers | Tommy Spangler |
| Mercer Bears | Southern | Joel Taylor | 2026 | 2 | 1 | .667 | 14 | 11 | .560 | Austin Davis | Tripp Weaver | Brandon Taylor |
| Samford Bulldogs | Southern | John Grass | 2026 | 0 | 3 | .000 | 72 | 29 | .713 | John Grass | Mickey Conn / Aashon Larkins | Will Gilchrist |
| Tennessee Tech Golden Eagles | Southern | Bobby Wilder | 2024 | 21 | 7 | .750 | 98 | 63 | .609 | Drew Belcher | Chase Mummau | Frank Wilson Jr. |
| VMI Keydets | Southern | Ashley Ingram | 2026 | 0 | 3 | .000 | 16 | 9 | .640 | Brent Thompson | Jared Backus | Edgar Weiser |
| Western Carolina Catamounts | Southern | Kerwin Bell | 2021 | 32 | 28 | .533 | 125 | 70 | .641 | Rylan Wells | Nick Reveiz | Kerry Webb |
| Wofford Terriers | Southern | Shawn Watson | 2022 | 18 | 26 | .409 | 29 | 48 | .377 | Shawn Watson | Mitch Doolittle | Dustin Royston |
| East Texas A&M Lions | Southland | Clint Dolezel | 2023 | 8 | 29 | .216 | 8 | 29 | .216 | Clint Dolezel | Jesse Thompson | Tony McClain |
| Houston Christian Huskies | Southland | Jason Bachtel | 2024 | 9 | 18 | .333 | 23 | 24 | .489 | Mike Nesbitt | Zach Wilkerson | Adam Fujiwara |
| Incarnate Word Cardinals | Southland | Clint Killough | 2023 | 25 | 13 | .658 | 25 | 13 | .658 | Justin Bane | Ben Olson | John Scifers |
| Lamar Cardinals | Southland | Peter Rossomando | 2023 | 23 | 16 | .590 | 90 | 65 | .581 | Ryan McCarthy | Drew Christ | Daryl Daleen |
| McNeese Cowboys | Southland | Matt Viator | 2025 | 84 | 42 | .667 (Note: Includes tenure from 2006 to 2015) | 103 | 81 | .560 | Tyler Bolfing / Kyle Segler | Tony Pecoraro | Thomas Reese |
| Nicholls Colonels | Southland | Tommy Rybacki | 2025 | 6 | 9 | .400 | 6 | 9 | .400 | Matt Giampa | Darion Monroe | Webb Hamilton |
| Northwestern State Demons | Southland | Blaine McCorkle | 2024 | 1 | 26 | .037 | 32 | 51 | .386 | Carson Stewart | Matt Conner | Tyson Wachenheim |
| Southeastern Louisiana Lions | Southland | Frank Scelfo | 2018 | 54 | 42 | .563 | 54 | 42 | .563 | Matt Bergeron | Bill D'Ottavio | Edward Groth IV |
| Stephen F. Austin Lumberjacks | Southland | Colby Carthel | 2019 | 47 | 38 | .553 | 106 | 56 | .654 | Jared May | Caid Faske | Nik Nelson |
| UTRGV Vaqueros | Southland | Travis Bush | 2025 (Note: Bush was hired in December 2022.) | 10 | 5 | .667 | 10 | 5 | .667 | Theron Aych / Jeff Bowen | Brian Gamble | Marcus Coleman |
| Alabama A&M Bulldogs | SWAC | Sam Shade | 2025 | 6 | 9 | .400 | 24 | 24 | .500 | Dennis Alexander | Chris Shelling | Amos Jones |
| Alabama State Hornets | SWAC | Eddie Robinson | 2022 | 32 | 17 | .653 | 32 | 17 | .653 | Tony Hull | Billy Gresham / Todd Middleton | Ronnie Scott |
| Alcorn State Braves | SWAC | Cedric Thomas | 2024 | 13 | 14 | .481 | 21 | 28 | .429 | Aaron Anguiano | Deion Roberson | Derek Welch |
| Arkansas–Pine Bluff Lions | SWAC | Alonzo Hampton | 2023 | 9 | 28 | .243 | 9 | 28 | .243 | Stephen Barnette | Jeff Burrow | Keith Scott |
| Bethune-Cookman Wildcats | SWAC | Raymond Woodie Jr. | 2023 | 12 | 25 | .324 | 12 | 25 | .324 | Donte' Pimpleton | Robert Wimberly / Otis Mounds | Pat Brown / Doc Gamble |
| Florida A&M Rattlers | SWAC | Quinn Gray | 2026 | 1 | 2 | .333 | 25 | 13 | .658 | Nick Sewak | Ryan Lewis Sr. | Elijah Haggard |
| Grambling State Tigers | SWAC | Mickey Joseph | 2024 | 14 | 13 | .519 | 30 | 26 | .536 | Eric Dooley | Jason Rollins | Alan Ricard |
| Jackson State Tigers | SWAC | T. C. Taylor | 2023 | 30 | 9 | .769 | 30 | 9 | .769 | Manny Ramirez / Rip Kirk | Torenzo Quinn | Javancy Jones |
| Mississippi Valley State Delta Devils | SWAC | Terrell Buckley | 2025 | 3 | 12 | .200 | 3 | 12 | .200 | Grant Simms | Kelvin Smith | Arlo Henderson |
| Prairie View A&M Panthers | SWAC | Tremaine Jackson | 2025 | 11 | 6 | .647 | 51 | 18 | .739 | Chris Buckner | Brandon Andersen / Trent Earley | Jackson Hadley |
| Southern Jaguars | SWAC | Marshall Faulk | 2026 | 1 | 2 | .333 | 1 | 2 | .333 | Ken Merchant | Todd Lyght | Vacant |
| Texas Southern Tigers | SWAC | Cris Dishman | 2024 | 11 | 13 | .458 | 11 | 13 | .458 | Steven Smith | Scott Vestal | Billy Owens |
| Abilene Christian Wildcats | UAC | Keith Patterson | 2022 | 30 | 23 | .566 | 30 | 24 | .556 | Graham Harrell | Nick Holt | Ty Morris |
| Austin Peay Governors | UAC | Jeff Faris | 2024 | 13 | 14 | .481 | 13 | 14 | .481 | Quinn Billerman | Greg Jones | Lucas Reed |
| Central Arkansas Bears | UAC | Nathan Brown | 2018 | 48 | 45 | .516 | 48 | 45 | .516 | Jake Walker / Gunnar Boykin | Chad Williams | Kre Trammell / Walker Ashburn |
| Eastern Kentucky Colonels | UAC | Walt Wells | 2020 | 36 | 35 | .507 | 36 | 35 | .507 | Andy Richman | Jake Johnson | Derek Day |
| North Alabama Lions | UAC | Brent Dearmon | 2023 | 9 | 29 | .237 | 19 | 30 | .388 | Travis Partridge | Clint Bowen | Vacant |
| Tarleton State Texans | UAC | Todd Whitten | 2016 | 129 | 59 | .686 (Note: Includes tenure from 1996 and 2000 to 2004) | 154 | 87 | .639 | Chris Ross / Scott Carey | Tyrone Nix | Michael Walton |
| West Florida Argonauts | UAC | Kaleb Nobles | 2023 | 27 | 9 | .750 | 27 | 9 | .750 | Donny Baker | Kavell Conner | Jordan Remsza |
| West Georgia Wolves | UAC | Steve Englehart | 2026 | 0 | 3 | .000 | 91 | 77 | .542 | Jayson Martin | Dan Owen | Tyus Alcorn |

== See also ==
- List of current NCAA Division I FBS football coaches
- List of current NCAA Division II football coaches
- List of current NCAA Division III football coaches
- List of current NCAA Division I baseball coaches
- List of current NCAA Division I men's basketball coaches
- List of current NCAA Division I women's basketball coaches
- List of current NCAA Division I men's ice hockey coaches
- List of NCAA Division I men's soccer coaches
