= 2024 Mercyhurst Lakers football team =

American college football season

2024 Mercyhurst Lakers football
- Conference: Northeast Conference
- Record: 4–7 (0–0 NEC)
- Head coach: Ryan Riemedio (3rd season)
- Offensive coordinator: Thomas Sydeski (1st season)
- Home stadium: Saxon Stadium

2024 Northeast Conference football standings
	Conf.			Overall
Team	W		L	W		L
Central Connecticut +^	5	–	1	7	–	6
Duquesne +	5	–	1	8	–	3
Robert Morris	4	–	2	7	–	5
LIU	3	–	3	4	–	8
Wagner	2	–	4	4	–	8
Saint Francis (PA)	2	–	4	4	–	7
Mercyhurst*	0	–	0	4	–	7
Stonehill*	0	–	6	1	–	10
+ – Conference co-champions; ^ – FCS playoff participant; * – Stonehill and Mercyhurst are ineligible for NEC title and FCS postseason play due to transition from NCAA Division II.; Rankings from STATS Poll

The 2024 Mercyhurst Lakers football team represented Mercyhurst University as a member of the Northeast Conference (NEC) during the 2024 NCAA Division I FCS football season.

== Schedule ==
Date	Time	Opponent	Site	TV	Result	Attendance
August 29	7:00 p.m.	at Wheeling*	Bishop Schmitt Field; Wheeling, WV	MEC TV	W 28–25	500
September 7	7:00 p.m.	at Howard*	William H. Greene Stadium; Washington, DC	ESPN+	L 31–32	6,568
September 14	12:00 p.m.	at Robert Morris	Joe Walton Stadium; Moon Township, PA	ESPN+	L 28–55	2,393
September 21	3:00 p.m.	at No. 3 Montana State*	Bobcat Stadium; Bozeman, MT	ESPN+	L 13–52	21,547
September 28	1:00 p.m.	Frostburg State*	Saxon Stadium; Erie, PA	NEC Front Row	L 24–25	1,150
October 5	1:00 p.m.	Buffalo State*^{†}	Saxon Stadium; Erie, PA	NEC Front Row	W 55–0	2,215
October 12	12:00 p.m	at Central Connecticut	Arute Field; New Britain, CT	NEC Front Row	L 20–38	3,167
October 26	12:00 p.m.	at Sacred Heart*	Campus Field; Fairfield, CT	SNY	L 14–31	2,645
November 2	12:00 p.m.	at Duquesne	Rooney Field; Pittsburgh, PA	NEC Front Row	L 24–31	1,654
November 9	11:00am	Lincoln (CA)*	Saxon Stadium; Erie, PA	NEC Front Row	W 66–0	540
November 23	1:00 p.m.	Saint Francis	Saxon Stadium; Erie, PA	NEC Front Row	W 21–20	826
*Non-conference game; ^{†}Homecoming; Rankings from STATS Poll released prior to the game; All times are in Eastern time; Source:

== Game summaries ==
=== at Wheeling (DII) ===
Game One – Mercyhurst Lakers (0–0) vs Wheeling Cardinals (DII) (0–0) – Game summary

Quarter	1	2	3	4	Total
Lakers	7	14	7	0	28
Cardinals (DII)	7	10	0	8	25

at Bishop Schmitt Field • Wheeling, WV

- Date: Thursday August 29, 2024
- Game time: 7:00 PM EST
- Game weather: Sunny, 91 °F (33 °C)
- Game attendance: 500
- Referee: Anthony LaScola
- TV announcers (MEC TV): TBD

Game information

First quarter

- (12:58) WHL – Tre Holloway 52-yard pass from Javon Davis, Joao Lima kick (Drive: 5 plays, 72 yards, 1:56; Wheeling 7–0)
- (11:10) MER – Russell Pytlak 10-yard pass from Adam Urena, Nathan Nagucki kick (Drive: 4 plays, 75 yards, 1:43; Tied 7–7)

Second quarter

- (14:52) WHL – Joao Lima 37-yard field goal (Drive: 11 plays, 50 yards, 5:28; Wheeling 10–7)
- (9:40) MER – Cameron Barmore 27-yard pass from Adam Urena, Nathan Nagucki kick (Drive: 10 plays, 86 yards, 5:06; Mercyhurst 14–10)
- (1:56) WHL – Dawaun Green 1-yard run, Joao Lima kick (Drive: 16 plays, 75 yards, 7:44; Wheeling 17–14)
- (0:26) MER – Brian Trobel 1-yard run, Nathan Nagucki kick (Drive: 6 plays, 60 yards, 1:22; Mercyhurst 21–17)

Third quarter

- (10:46) MER – Cameron Barmore 4-yard pass from Adam Urena, Nathan Nagucki kick (Drive: 10 plays, 75 yards, 4:07; Mercyhurst 28–17)

Fourth quarter

- (0:23) WHL – Tre Holloway 33-yard pass from Javon Davis, Tre Holloway rush (Drive: 1 play, 43 yards, 2:22; Mercyhurst 28–25)

Statistics	MERC	WHEE
First downs	23	18
Total yards	418	349
Rushing yards	151	128
Passing yards	267	221
Passing: Comp–Att–Int	21–31–0	15–33–0
Time of possession	34:22	25:38

Team	Category	Player	Statistics
Mercyhurst	Passing	Adam Urena	21/31, 267 yards, 3 TD
Mercyhurst	Rushing	Brian Trobel	9 carries, 76 yards, TD
Mercyhurst	Receiving	Cameron Barmore	8 receptions, 104 yards, 2 TD
Wheeling	Passing	Javon Davis	15/33, 221 yards, 2 TD
Wheeling	Rushing	Javon Davis	10 carries, 61 yards
Wheeling	Receiving	Tre Holloway	6 receptions, 125 yards, 2 TD

=== at Howard ===
Game Two – Mercyhurst Lakers (1-0) at Howard Bison (0-1) – Game summary

Quarter	1	2	3	4	Total
Lakers	3	0	7	21	31
Bison	0	14	7	11	32

at Greene Stadium, Washington, DC

- Date: Saturday September 7, 2024
- Game time: 7:00 PM
- Game weather: Sunny • Temperature: 70 °F (21 °C) • Wind: NW at 9 miles per hour (14 km/h)
- Game attendance: 6,568
- Referee: Carlos Torian
- TV announcers (ESPN+): Trevin A. Jones (play-by-play) and Nate Henry (color analyst)

Game information

First quarter

- (5:44) MER – Nathan Nagucki 21-yard field goal (Drive: 14 plays, 94 yards, 5:48; Mercyhurst 3–0)

Second quarter

- (7:25) HOW – Jarrett Hunter 11-yard run, Dylan West kick (Drive: 11 plays, 73 yards, 6:32; Howard 7–3)
- (1:07) HOW – Jarrett Hunter 7-yard run, Dylan West kick (Drive: 9 plays, 56 yards, 2:42; Howard 14–3)

Third quarter

- (8:51) HOW – Nathanial Clark 11-yard pass from Ja'Shawn Scroggins, Dylan West kick (Drive: 9 plays, 64 yards, 4:28; Howard 21–3)
- (4:18) MER – Ayron Rodriguez 2-yard run, Nathan Nagucki kick (Drive: 11 plays, 73 yards, 4:33; Howard 21–10)

Fourth quarter

- (14:59) MER – Rylan Davison 8-yard pass from Adam Urena, Rylan Davison pass (Drive: 5 plays, 72 yards, 0:01; Howard 21–18)
- (9:48) HOW – Jarrett Hunter 1-yard run (Drive: 6 plays, 26 yards, 2:38; Howard 27–18)
- (5:12) MER – Cameron Barmore 13-yard pass from Adam Urena, Nathan Nagucki kick (Drive: 8 plays, 71 yards, 4:31; Howard 27–25)
- (0:41) MER – Cameron Barmore 22-yard pass from Adam Urena (Drive: 8 plays, 61 yards, 2:34; Mercyhurst 31–27)
- (0:41) HOW – Kenny Gallop Jr. 0-yard PAT return (Mercyhurst 31–29)
- (0:00) HOW – Dylan West 37-yard field goal (Drive: 5 plays, 55 yards, 0:41; Howard 32–31)

Statistics	MERC	HOW
First downs	24	25
Total yards	334	432
Rushing yards	27–109	49–275
Passing yards	225	157
Passing: Comp–Att–Int	23–34–0	12–22–0
Time of possession	24:55	32:12

Team	Category	Player	Statistics
Mercyhurst	Passing	Adam Urena	23/34, 225 yards, 2 TD
Mercyhurst	Rushing	Brian Trobel	4 carries, 64 yards
Mercyhurst	Receiving	Chaz Davis	3 receptions, 55 yards
Howard	Passing	Jashawn Scroggins	12/22, 157 yards, TD
Howard	Rushing	Jarret Hunter	27 carries, 126 yards, 3 TD
Howard	Receiving	Isiah Williams	2 receptions, 44 yards

=== at Robert Morris ===
Game Three – Mercyhurst Lakers (1–1) vs Robert Morris Colonials (0–2) – Game summary

Quarter	1	2	3	4	Total
Lakers	0	14	7	7	28
Colonials	14	20	7	14	55

at Joe Walton Stadium • Moon Township, PA

- Date: Saturday September 14, 2024
- Game time: 12:00 PM EST
- Game weather: Sunny, 86 °F (30 °C)
- Game attendance: 2,393
- Referee: Michael Davis
- TV announcers (ESPN+): TBD

Game information

First quarter

- (10:44) RMU – Noah Robinson 14-yard pass from Anthony Chiccitt, Jayson Jenkins kick (Drive: 9 plays, 75 yards, 4:11; Robert Morris 7–0)
- (9:06) RMU – DJ Moyer 3-yard run, Jayson Jenkins kick (Drive: 2 plays, 28 yards, 0:55; Robert Morris 14–0)

Second quarter

- (10:02) RMU – Chaz Middleton 5-yard pass from Anthony Chiccitt, Jayson Jenkins kick (Drive: 6 plays, 42 yards, 2:56; Robert Morris 21–0)
- (4:57) MER – Cameron Barmore 5-yard pass from Adam Urena (Drive: 12 plays, 72 yards, 4:59; Robert Morris 21–6)
- (3:21) MER – Ayron Rodriguez 1-yard run, Ayron Rodriguez pass (Drive: 1 play, 1 yard, 0:04; Robert Morris 21–14)
- (3:04) RMU – Noah Robinson 63-yard pass from Anthony Chicitt (Drive: 1 play, 63 yards, 0:11; Robert Morris 27–14)
- (0:45) RMU – Trenell Ridgley 17-yard pass from Anthony Chicitt, Jayson Jenkins kick (Drive: 5 plays, 59 yards, 1:02; Robert Morris 34–14)

Third quarter

- (9:54) MER – Earnest Davis 1-yard run, Nathan Nagucki kick (Drive: 9 plays, 75 yards, 5:06; Robert Morris 34–21)
- (1:26) RMU – Ethan Shine 2-yard pass from Anthony Chiccitt, Jayson Jenkins kick (Drive: 15 plays, 85 yards, 8:13; Robert Morris 41–21)

Fourth quarter

- (11:18) RMU – Tyvon Edmonds Jr., 4-yard run, Jayson Jenkins kick (Drive: 7 plays, 80 yards, 3:35; Robert Morris 48–21)
- (6:11) RMU – Trevor Wilson 14-yard pass from Zach Tanner, Jayson Jenkins kick (Drive: 6 plays, 52 yards, 3:15; Robert Morris 55–21)
- (1:56) MER – Cameron Barmore 1-yard pass from Adam Urena, Nathan Nagucki kick (Drive: 12 plays, 72 yards, 4:08; Robert Morris 55–28)

Statistics	MERC	RMU
First downs	17	26
Total yards	297	536
Rushing yards	93	171
Passing yards	204	365
Passing: Comp–Att–Int	27–41–1	23–29–1
Time of possession	29:04	30:56

Team	Category	Player	Statistics
Mercyhurst	Passing	Adam Urena	27/41, 204 yards, 2 TD, INT
Mercyhurst	Rushing	Earnest Davis	11 carries, 81 yards, TD
Mercyhurst	Receiving	Cameron Barmore	9 receptions, 98 yards, 2 TD
Robert Morris	Passing	Anthony Chiccitt	19/25, 307 yards, 5 TD, INT
Robert Morris	Rushing	Tyvon Edmonds Jr.	19 carries, 133 yards, TD
Robert Morris	Receiving	Noah Robinson	4 receptions, 116 yards, 2 TD

=== at No. 3 Montana State ===
Game Four – Mercyhurst Lakers (1–2) vs No. 3 Montana State Bobcats (3–0) – Game summary

Quarter	1	2	3	4	Total
Lakers	0	0	6	7	13
No. 3 Bobcats	10	21	14	7	52

at Bobcat Stadium • Bozeman, MT

- Date: Saturday September 21, 2024
- Game time: 3:00 PM EST
- Game weather: Sunny, 49 °F (9 °C)
- Game attendance: 21,547
- TV announcers (ESPN+): TBD

Game information

First quarter

- (8:07) MTST - Myles Sansted 23-yard field goal (Montana State 3-0)
- (1:47) MTST - Scottre Humphrey 5-yard run (Myles Sansted kick) (Montana State 10-0)

Second quarter

- (7:24) MTST - Taco Dowler 5-yard pass from Tommy Mellott (Myles Sansted kick) (Montana State 17-0)
- (5:56) MTST - Zac Crews 24-yard blocked punt return (Myles Sansted kick) (Montana State 24-0)
- (0:27) MTST - Adam Jones 50-yard pass from Tommy Mellott (Myles Sansted kick) (Montana State 31-0)

Third quarter

- (8:23) MTST - Rohan Jones 16-yard pass from Tommy Mellott (Myles Sansted kick) (Montana State 38-0)
- (5:36) MERC - Adonis Marshall 43-yard fumble return (PAT failed) (Montana State 38-6)
- (3:13) MTST - Colson Coon 50-yard run (Myles Sansted kick) (Montana State 45-6)

Fourth quarter

- (8:47) MERC - Joe Kerbacher 5-yard pass from Adam Urena (Nathan Nagucki kick) (Montana State 45-13)
- (3:43) MTST - Chance Wilson 5-yard run (Myles Sansted kick) (Montana State 52-13)

Statistics	MERC	MTST
First downs	16	23
Total yards	233	502
Rushing yards	20	256
Passing yards	213	246
Passing: Comp–Att–Int	28–44–0	15–19–0
Time of possession	32:55	27:05

Team	Category	Player	Statistics
Mercyhurst	Passing	Adam Urena	28/44, 213 yards, TD
Mercyhurst	Rushing	Ayron Rodriguez	15 carries, 42 yards
Mercyhurst	Receiving	Cameron Barmore	7 receptions, 95 yards
Montana State	Passing	Tommy Mellott	14/18, 214 yards, 3 TD
Montana State	Rushing	Colson Coon	10 carries, 102 yards, TD
Montana State	Receiving	Adam Jones	3 receptions, 72 yards, TD

=== Frostburg State (DII) ===
Game Five – Frostburg State Bobcats (DII) (3–0) vs Mercyhurst Lakers (1–3) – Game summary

Quarter	1	2	3	4	Total
Bobcats (DII)	14	3	8	0	25
Lakers	0	12	6	6	24

at Saxon Stadium • Erie, PA

- Date: Saturday September 28, 2024
- Game time: 1:00 PM EST
- Game weather: 0 °F (−18 °C)
- TV announcers (NEC Front Row): TBD

Game information

First quarter
Second quarter
Third quarter
Fourth quarter

Statistics	FRO	MERC
First downs	20	16
Total yards	387	336
Rushing yards	203	107
Passing yards	184	229
Passing: Comp–Att–Int	18–27–1	18–23–0
Time of possession	34:07	21:59

Team	Category	Player	Statistics
Frostburg State	Passing		
Frostburg State	Rushing		
Frostburg State	Receiving		
Mercyhurst	Passing		
Mercyhurst	Rushing		
Mercyhurst	Receiving		

=== Buffalo State (DII) ===
Game Six – Buffalo State Bengals (DII) (2–1) vs Mercyhurst Lakers (1–4) – Game summary

Quarter	1	2	3	4	Total
Bengals (DII)	0	0	0	0	0
Lakers	17	17	7	14	55

at Saxon Stadium • Erie, PA

- Date: Saturday October 5, 2024
- Game time: 1:00 PM EST
- Game weather: Sunny, 65 °F (18 °C)
- TV announcers (NEC Front Row): TBD

Game information

First quarter
Second quarter
Third quarter
Fourth quarter

Statistics	BUF	MERC
First downs	9	29
Total yards	139	572
Rushing yards	63	209
Passing yards	76	363
Passing: Comp–Att–Int	11–27–1	28–38–0
Time of possession	25:19	34:14

Team	Category	Player	Statistics
Buffalo State	Passing	Noah Kimble	8/19, 60 yards, INT
Buffalo State	Rushing	Chris Boadi	9 carries, 35 yards
Buffalo State	Receiving	Mikai Johnson	1 receptions, 30 yards
Mercyhurst	Passing	Adam Urena	26/36, 312 yards, 6 TD
Mercyhurst	Rushing	Ayron Rodriguez	8 carries, 71 yards
Mercyhurst	Receiving	Austin Urena	5 receptions, 77 yards, TD

=== at Central Connecticut ===
Game Seven – Mercyhurst Lakers (2–4) vs Central Connecticut Blue Devils (2–3) – Game summary

Quarter	1	2	3	4	Total
Lakers	7	0	7	6	20
Blue Devils	0	17	14	7	38

at Arute Field • New Britain, CT

- Date: Saturday October 12, 2024
- Game time: 12:00 PM EST
- Game weather: Sunny, 69 °F (21 °C)
- Game attendance: 3,167
- Referee: Lance Carlson
- TV announcers (NEC Front Row): Bruce Biel (play-by-play) and Marc Robbins (analyst)

Game information

First quarter

- (5:58) MERC - Brian Trobel 22 Yd pass from Adam Urena (Nathan Nagucki Kick) (Drive: 8 plays, 78 yards, 4:31; Mercyhurst 7-0)

Second quarter

- (14:12) CCSU - Ricky Ortega 8 Yd Run (Jack Barnum Kick) (Drive: 13 plays, 73 yards, 6:43; Tied)
- (12:30) CCSU - Paul Marsh Jr. 10 Yd pass from Brady Olson (Jack Barnum Kick) (Drive: 3 plays, 11 yards, 1:28; Central Connecticut 14-7)
- (1:06) CCSU - Jack Barnum 22 Yd Field Goal (Drive: 12 plays, 76 yards, 6:10; Central Connecticut 17-7)

Third quarter

- (12:10) CCSU - Joe Crifasi 16 Yd pass from Brady Olson (Jack Barnum Kick) (Drive: 7 plays, 57 yards, 2:45; Central Connecticut 24-7)
- (6:00) CCSU - Paul Marsh Jr. 39 Yd pass from Brady Olson (Jack Barnum Kick) (Drive: 2 plays, 42 yards, 0:42; Central Connecticut 31-7)
- (0:31) MERC - Brian Trobel 3 Yd Run (Nathan Nagucki Kick) (Drive: 11 plays, 89 yards, 5:24; Central Connecticut 31-14)

Fourth quarter

- (10:23) MERC - Brian Trobel 14 Yd Run (Nathan Nagucki PAT failed) (Drive: 4 plays, 80 yards, 1:32; Central Connecticut 31-20)
- (1:39) CCSU - Jadon Turner 59 Yd Run (Jack Barnum Kick) (Drive: 8 plays, 84 yards, 4:27; Central Connecticut 38-20)

Statistics	MERC	CCSU
First downs	26	20
Total yards	303	425
Rushing yards	17	301
Passing yards	286	124
Passing: Comp–Att–Int	25-45-3	9-16-0
Time of possession	28:14	31:46

Team	Category	Player	Statistics
Mercyhurst	Passing	Adam Urena	25/45, 286 yards, 1 TD, 3 INT
Mercyhurst	Rushing	Earnest Davis	4 carries, 20 yards
Mercyhurst	Receiving	Cameron Barmore	8 receptions, 103 yards
Central Connecticut	Passing	Brady Olson	9/14, 124 yards, 3 TD
Central Connecticut	Rushing	Elijah Howard	27 carries, 169 yards
Central Connecticut	Receiving	Paul Marsh Jr.	4 receptions, 67 yards, 2 TD

=== at Sacred Heart ===
Game Eight – Mercyhurst Lakers (2–5) vs Sacred Heart Pioneers (3–5) – Game summary

Quarter	1	2	3	4	Total
Lakers	0	7	0	7	14
Pioneers	7	14	7	3	31

at Campus Field • Fairfield, CT

- Date: Saturday October 26, 2024
- Game time: 12:00 PM EST
- Game weather: Sunny, 63 °F (17 °C)
- TV announcers (SNY): TBD

Game information

First quarter
Second quarter
Third quarter
Fourth quarter

Statistics	MERC	SHU
First downs	23	17
Total yards	354	372
Rushing yards	125	231
Passing yards	229	141
Passing: Comp–Att–Int	25–44–0	10–14–0
Time of possession	35:33	24:27

Team	Category	Player	Statistics
Mercyhurst	Passing	Adam Urena	25/43, 229 yards, 2 TD
Mercyhurst	Rushing	Brian Trobel	17 carries, 96 yards
Mercyhurst	Receiving	Cameron Barmore	9 receptions, 96 yards
Sacred Heart	Passing	John Michalski	10/14, 141 yards, 1 TD
Sacred Heart	Rushing	Jalen Madison	16 carries, 140 yards, 1 TD
Sacred Heart	Receiving	Mason Stahl	1 reception, 48 yards

=== at Duquesne ===
Game Nine – Mercyhurst Lakers (2–6) vs Duquesne Dukes (5–2) – Game summary

Quarter	1	2	3	4	Total
Lakers	7	3	7	7	24
Dukes	0	7	10	14	31

at Rooney Field • Pittsburgh, PA

- Date: Saturday November 2, 2024
- Game time: 12:00 PM EST
- Game weather: Sunny, 55 °F (13 °C)
- TV announcers (NEC Front Row): TBD

Game information

First quarter
Second quarter
Third quarter
Fourth quarter

Statistics	MERC	DUQ
First downs	27	20
Total yards	397	464
Rushing yards	52	217
Passing yards	345	247
Passing: Comp–Att–Int	38-52-1	13-25-1
Time of possession	31:13	24:08

Team	Category	Player	Statistics
Mercyhurst	Passing		
Mercyhurst	Rushing		
Mercyhurst	Receiving		
Duquesne	Passing		
Duquesne	Rushing		
Duquesne	Receiving		

=== Lincoln (CA) (IND) ===
Game Ten – Lincoln Oaklanders (IND) (0–9) vs Mercyhurst Lakers (2–7) – Game summary

Quarter	1	2	3	4	Total
Oaklanders (IND) (Note: Lincoln is unaffiliated with any national sanctioning body and permanently plays as a travel team.)	0	0	0	0	0
Lakers	14	32	7	13	66

at Saxon Stadium • Erie, PA

- Date: Saturday November 9, 2024
- Game weather: 0 °F (−18 °C)
- TV announcers (NEC Front Row): TBD

Game information

First quarter
Second quarter
Third quarter
Fourth quarter

Statistics	LCLN	MERC
First downs	12	26
Total yards	214	501
Rushing yards	33	253
Passing yards	181	248
Passing: Comp–Att–Int	11-30-7	18-24-0
Time of possession	23:57	36:03

Team	Category	Player	Statistics
Lincoln (CA)	Passing		
Lincoln (CA)	Rushing		
Lincoln (CA)	Receiving		
Mercyhurst	Passing		
Mercyhurst	Rushing		
Mercyhurst	Receiving		

=== Saint Francis (PA) ===
Game Eleven – Saint Francis Red Flash (0–0) vs Mercyhurst Lakers (3–7) – Game summary

Quarter	1	2	3	4	Total
Red Flash	7	6	0	7	20
Lakers	0	3	3	15	21

at Saxon Stadium • Erie, PA

- Date: Saturday November 23, 2024
- Game time: 1:00 PM EST
- Game weather: 0 °F (−18 °C)
- TV announcers (NEC Front Row): TBD

Game information

First quarter
Second quarter
Third quarter
Fourth quarter

Statistics	SFPA	MERC
First downs	17	16
Total yards	316	304
Rushing yards	71	64
Passing yards	245	240
Passing: Comp–Att–Int	18-26-0	21-33-0
Time of possession	32:04	27:56

Team	Category	Player	Statistics
Saint Francis (PA)	Passing		
Saint Francis (PA)	Rushing		
Saint Francis (PA)	Receiving		
Mercyhurst	Passing		
Mercyhurst	Rushing		
Mercyhurst	Receiving		
