= 2026 Weber State Wildcats football team =

American college football season

2026 Weber State Wildcats football

FCS Playoffs
- Conference: Big Sky Conference

Ranking
- STATS: No. 15
- FCS Coaches: No. 16
- Record: 8–4 (7–2 Big Sky)
- Head coach: Eric Kjar (1st season)
- Defensive coordinator: Gavin Fowler (1st season)
- Home stadium: Stewart Stadium

2026 Big Sky Conference football standings
	Conf.			Overall
Team	W		L	W		L
No. 2 Montana State $^	8	–	1	11	–	1
No. 15 Weber State ^	7	–	2	8	–	4
No. 12 Northern Arizona ^	7	–	2	9	–	3
No. 8 Montana ^	6	–	3	8	–	4
No. 23 UC Davis	6	–	3	8	–	4
Idaho	5	–	4	5	–	7
Southern Utah	4	–	4	6	–	6
No. 25 Idaho State ^	4	–	5	7	–	5
Cal Poly	3	–	6	4	–	8
Portland State	3	–	6	3	–	9
Eastern Washington	2	–	7	3	–	9
Northern Colorado	2	–	7	3	–	9
Utah Tech	1	–	8	1	–	11
$ – Conference champion; ^ – FCS playoff participant; As of November 22, 2026; Rankings from STATS Poll

The 2026 Weber State Wildcats football team represents Weber State University as a member of the Big Sky Conference during the 2026 NCAA Division I FCS football season. The Wildcats are led by first-year head coach Eric Kjar and play their home games at Stewart Stadium in Ogden, Utah.

== Coaching changes ==
On December 16, 2025, it was announced that Eric Kjar was hired as the 13th head coach in program history.

== Personnel ==
=== Coaching staff ===
Name	Position
Eric Kjar	Head coach/Offensive Coordinator
Tanner Jacobson	Associate Head coach/Special teams coordinator/Inside Linebackers coach
Gavin Fowler	Defensive coordinator/Safeties coach
Isaac Asiata	Offensive line coach
Zach Larson	Quarterbacks coach/Pass Game Coordinator
Isiah Jackson	Wide receivers coach
Jace Campbell	Outside Linebackers coach
Kam Garrett	Cornerbacks coach
Tana Vea	Recruiting coordinator/Running backs coach
James Cowser	Defensive ends coach
Ono Tafisi	Defensive tackles coach
BJ Cavender	Tight Ends coach

== Schedule ==
Date	Time	Opponent	Rank	Site	TV	Result	Attendance
August 28	7:00 p.m.	at Northern Colorado		Nottingham Field; Greeley, CO	ESPN+	W 30–29	5,715
September 5	6:00 p.m.	at Southern Utah (Note: The game against Southern Utah, a fellow member of the Big Sky Conference, is a non-conference game and not count in the league standings.)*		Eccles Coliseum; Cedar City, UT (Beehive Bowl)	ESPN+	L 42–47	5,805
September 12	1:30 p.m.	at Colorado*		Folsom Field; Boulder, CO	ESPN+	L 21–52	49,363
September 19	6:00 p.m.	Northwestern State*		Stewart Stadium; Ogden, UT	ESPN+	W 49–20	7,738
September 26	6:00 p.m.	Portland State		Stewart Stadium; Ogden, UT	ESPN+	L 41–44	7,478
October 3	6:00 p.m.	at Cal Poly		Mustang Memorial Field; San Luis Obispo, CA	ESPN+	W 42–34 ^{2OT}	11,186
October 10	1:00 p.m.	Idaho		Stewart Stadium; Ogden, UT	KJZZ/KMYU	W 38–27	5,785
October 17	1:00 p.m.	No. 21 Idaho State^{†}		Stewart Stadium; Ogden, UT	KJZZ/KMYU	W 27–20	8,428
October 24	1:00 p.m.	at No. 3 Montana State	No. 22	Bobcat Stadium; Bozeman, MT	KUPX	L 33–38	22,167
October 31	1:00 p.m.	No. 20 UC Davis	No. 22	Stewart Stadium; Ogden, UT	KMYU	W 38–14	5,975
November 14	4:00 p.m.	at No. 5 Northern Arizona	No. 18	Walkup Skydome; Flagstaff, AZ	ESPN+	W 25–21	7,857
November 21	1:00 p.m.	Utah Tech	No. 15	Stewart Stadium; Ogden, UT	KJZZ/KMYU	W 31–24	6,754
November 28	1:00 p.m.	Western Illinois	No. 14	Stewart Stadium; Ogden, UT (FCS Playoffs First Round)	ESPN+		
*Non-conference game; ^{†}Homecoming; Rankings from STATS Poll released prior to the game; All times are in Mountain time

== Game summaries ==
=== at Northern Colorado ===
Weber State Wildcats (0–0) at Northern Colorado Bears (0–0) – Game summary

Quarter	1	2	3	4	Total
Wildcats	3	14	6	7	30
Bears	7	6	0	16	29

at Nottingham Field • Greeley, Colorado

- Date: August 28
- Game time: 7:00 p.m.
- Game weather: Sunny
- Game attendance: 5,715
- Referee: Spencer Mumford
- TV announcers (ESPN+): Christian Saez and Matt Gaiter

Game information

First quarter

- WEB – David Dellenbach 44-yard field goal, 13:45. WEB 3–0. Drive: 9 plays, 59 yards, 1:10.
- UNCO – Mathias Price 31-yard run (Landon Richardson kick), 0:00. UNCO 7–3. Drive: 8 plays, 65 yards, 5:08.

Second quarter

- WEB – Noah Kjar 15-yard pass from Devin Brown (David Dellenbach kick), 12:33. WEB 10–7. Drive: 8 plays, 75 yards, 2:27.
- UNCO – Kenny Lueth 2-yard run (Landon Richardson kick BLOCKED), 1:33. UNCO 13–10. Drive: 5 plays, 42 yards, 1:58.
- WEB – Noah Kjar 34-yard pass from Devin Brown (David Dellenbach kick), 1:00. WEB 17–13. Drive: 4 plays, 75 yards, 0:33.

Third quarter

- WEB – David Dellenbach 42-yard field goal, 8:15. WEB 20–13. Drive: 8 plays, 47 yards, 3:22.
- WEB – David Dellenbach 39-yard field goal, 2:56. WEB 23–13. Drive: 8 plays, 33 yards, 3:52.

Fourth quarter

- UNCO – Kenny Lueth 2-yard run (Benson Ashley kick), 13:28. WEB 23–20. Drive: 9 plays, 65 yards, 4:28.
- WEB – Mapa Vaenuku 1-yard run (David Dellenbach kick), 9:04. WEB 30–20. Drive: 9 plays, 70 yards, 4:17.
- UNCO – Benson Ashley 23-yard field goal, 4:02. WEB 30–23. Drive: 10 plays, 70 yards, 5:02.
- UNCO – Trey Olsen 12-yard pass from Kenny Lueth (Benson Ashley kick BLOCKED), 0:03. WEB 30–29. Drive: 15 plays, 80 yards, 2:25.

Statistics	WEB	UNCO
First downs	20	29
Plays–yards	57–370	79–485
Rushes–yards	29–137	46–259
Passing yards	233	226
Passing: comp–att–int	16–28–1	20–33–0
Turnovers	1	0
Time of possession	21:57	38:03

Team	Category	Player	Statistics
Weber State	Passing	Devin Brown	10/20, 179 yards, 2 TD, INT
Weber State	Rushing	Spencer Ferguson	12 carries, 74 yards
Weber State	Receiving	Noah Kjar	6 receptions, 114 yards, 2 TD
Northern Colorado	Passing	Kenny Lueth	20/33, 226 yards, TD
Northern Colorado	Rushing	Mathias Price	17 carries, 106 yards, TD
Northern Colorado	Receiving	Marcus Mozer	6 receptions, 70 yards

=== at Southern Utah (Beehive Bowl) ===
Weber State Wildcats (1–0) at Southern Utah Thunderbirds (0–1) – Game summary

Quarter	1	2	3	4	Total
Wildcats	7	22	7	6	42
Thunderbirds	7	13	21	6	47

at Eccles Coliseum • Cedar City, Utah

- Date: September 5
- Game time: 6:00 p.m.
- Game weather: Sunny • Temperature: 79 °F (26 °C) • Wind: N at 20 miles per hour (32 km/h)
- Game attendance: 5,805
- Referee: Jeff Rink
- TV announcers (ESPN+): Spencer McLaughlin and Lyle Santos

Game information

First quarter

- SUU – Will Burns 11-yard run (Jayden Rogers kick), 10:40. SUU 7–0. Drive: 4 plays, 50 yards, 1:47.
- WEB – Mapa Vaenuku 1-yard run (David Dellenbach kick), 0:36. Tied 7–7. Drive: 14 plays, 95 yards, 6:36.

Second quarter

- WEB – Zach Smith 25-yard blocked punt return (David Dellenbach run), 13:30. WEB 15–7.
- SUU – Will Burns 75-yard run (pass failed), 13:18. WEB 15–13. Drive: 1 play, 75 yards, 0:12.
- WEB – Spencer Ferguson 28-yard run (David Dellenbach kick), 10:24. WEB 22–13. Drive: 11 plays, 75 yards, 2:54.
- SUU – Floyd Chalk IV 4-yard run (Jayden Rogers kick), 6:18. WEB 22–20. Drive: 9 plays, 75 yards, 4:06.
- WEB – Noah Kjar 16-yard pass from Nate Dahle (David Dellenbach kick), 0:20. WEB 29–20. Drive: 8 plays, 93 yards, 1:35.

Third quarter

- SUU – Floyd Chalk IV 39-yard run (Jayden Rogers kick), 13:14. WEB 29–27. Drive: 4 plays, 65 yards, 1:46.
- SUU – Joshua Acord 16-yard pass from Will Burns (Jayden Rogers kick), 10:55. SUU 34–29. Drive: 3 plays, 40 yards, 1:19.
- WEB – Spencer Ferguson 1-yard run (David Dellenbach kick), 9:00. WEB 36–34. Drive: 5 plays, 75 yards, 1:55.
- SUU – Devin Downing 16-yard pass from Will Burns (Jayden Rogers kick), 2:49. SUU 41–36. Drive: 10 plays, 75 yards, 6:11.

Fourth quarter

- WEB – Noah Kjar 24-yard pass from Nate Dahle (pass failed), 13:53. WEB 42–41. Drive: 1 play, 24 yards, 0:05.
- SUU – Floyd Chalk IV 22-yard run (pass failed), 9:13. SUU 47–42. Drive: 8 plays, 62 yards, 4:40.

Statistics	WEB	SUU
First downs	22	26
Plays–yards	76–464	70–514
Rushes–yards	32–182	52–368
Passing yards	282	146
Passing: comp–att–int	21–44–1	10–18–1
Turnovers	2	1
Time of possession	26:10	33:50

Team	Category	Player	Statistics
Weber State	Passing	Nate Dahle	21/44, 282 yards, 2 TD, INT
Weber State	Rushing	Spencer Ferguson	16 carries, 91 yards, 2 TD
Weber State	Receiving	Noah Kjar	9 receptions, 150 yards, 2 TD
Southern Utah	Passing	Will Burns	10/18, 146 yards, 2 TD, INT
Southern Utah	Rushing	Floyd Chalk IV	24 carries, 183 yards, 3 TD
Southern Utah	Receiving	David Spjut	1 reception, 44 yards

=== at Colorado (FBS) ===
Weber State Wildcats (1–1) at Colorado Buffaloes (FBS) (1–0) – Game summary

Quarter	1	2	3	4	Total
Wildcats	7	7	0	7	21
Buffaloes	21	21	3	7	52

at Folsom Field • Boulder, Colorado

- Date: September 12
- Game time: 1:30 p.m.
- Game weather: Cloudy • Temperature: 73 °F (23 °C)
- Game attendance: 49,363
- Referee: Cravonne Barrett
- TV announcers (ESPN+): Pete Sousa (play-by-play) and Leger Douzable (analyst)

Game information

First quarter

- (14:25) COLO – DeAndre Moore Jr. 66-yard pass from Julian Lewis, Elliot Arnold kick (Drive: 1 play, 66 yards, 0:10; COLO 7–0)
- (11:54) COLO – Joseph Williams 63-yard pass from Julian Lewis, Elliot Arnold kick (Drive: 2 plays, 63 yards, 0:17; COLO 14–0)
- (7:07) WEB – Robert Young 13-yard pass from Nate Dahle, David Dellenbach kick (Drive: 5 plays, 28 yards, 1:37; COLO14–7)
- (4:52) Ernest Campbell 48-yard pass from Julian Lewis, Elliot Arnold kick (Drive: 5 plays, 68 yards, 2:06; COLO 21–7)

Second quarter

- (14:50) COLO – Micah Welch 55-yard run, Elliot Arnold kick (Drive: 5 plays, 71 yards, 1:29; COLO 28–7)
- (12:11) WEB – Noah Kjar 6-yard pass from Nate Dahle, David Dellenbach kick (Drive: 6 plays, 75 yards, 2:39; COLO 28–14)
- (7:38) COLO – Joseph Williams 32-yard pass from Julian Lewis, Elliot Arnold kick (Drive: 9 plays, 80 yards, 4:25; COLO35–14)
- (0:51) COLO – Julian Lewis 3-yard run, Elliot Arnold kick (Drive: 7 plays, 55 yards, 1:01; COLO 42–14)

Third quarter

- (8:09) COLO – Elliot Arnold 52-yard field goal (Drive: 15 plays, 68 yards, 6:47; COLO 45–14)

Fourth quarter

- (11:35) COLO – Kaneal Sweetwyne 9-yard run, Elliot Arnold kick (Drive: 11 plays, 57 yards, 4:19; COLO 52–14)
- (7:42) WEB – Noah Kjar 12-yard pass from Nate Dahle, David Dellenbach kick (Drive: 8 plays, 79 yards, 3:45; COLO 52–21)

Statistics	WEB	COLO
First downs	23	24
Plays–yards	81–373	73–578
Rushes–yards	29–128	38–180
Passing yards	245	398
Passing: comp–att–int	22–52–1	26–35–0
Turnovers	2	2
Time of possession	29:55	30:05

Team	Category	Player	Statistics
Weber State	Passing	Nate Dahle	20/48, 244 yards, 3 TD, INT
Weber State	Rushing	Omar Shah	12 carries, 65 yards
Weber State	Receiving	Noah Kjar	7 receptions, 121 yards, 2 TD
Colorado	Passing	Julian Lewis	17/23, 366 yards, 4 TD
Colorado	Rushing	Micah Welch	11 carries, 106 yards, TD
Colorado	Receiving	Joseph Williams	4 receptions, 123 yards, 2 TD

=== Northwestern State ===
Northwestern State Demons (0–3) at Weber State Wildcats (1–2) – Game summary

Quarter	1	2	3	4	Total
Demons	0	6	0	14	20
Wildcats	21	7	14	7	49

at Stewart Stadium • Ogden, Utah

- Date: September 19
- Game time: 6:00 p.m.
- Game weather: Sunny • Temperature: 66 °F (19 °C) • Wind: NW 3 mph (4.8 km/h)
- Game attendance: 7,738
- Referee: Mike Bezner
- TV announcers (ESPN+): Mike Folta and Riley Jensen

Game information

First quarter

- WEB – 12:42 Marvin Session 71-yard pass from Nate Dahle (David Dellenbach kick). WEB 7–0. Drive: 6 plays, 51 yards, 2:10.
- WEB – 10:03 Tre Turner 67-yard return (David Dellenbach kick). WEB 14–0.
- WEB – 9:42 Spencer Ferguson 23-yard run (David Dellenbach kick). WEB 21–0. Drive: 2 plays, 23 yards, 0:15.

Second quarter

- NWST – 14:01 Brendan Webb 4-yard pass from Zach Wilke (Kick blocked). WEB 21–6. Drive: 9 plays, 50 yards, 3:20.
- WEB – 0:28 Seth Rigtrup 1-yard run (David Dellenbach kick). WEB 28–6. Drive: 10 plays, 61 yards, 2:57.

Third quarter

- WEB – 9:41 Seth Rigtrup 6-yard run (David Dellenbach kick). WEB 35–6. Drive: 8 plays, 55 yards, 2:43.
- WEB – 6:29 Ammon Munyer 37-yard pass from Nate Dahle (David Dellenbach kick). WEB 42–6. Drive: 3 plays, 80 yards, 1:19.

Fourth quarter

- NWST – 13:14 Joseph Moreland 5-yard pass from Zach Wilcke (Payne Williams III kick). WEB 42–13. Drive: 6 plays, 9 yards, 2:16.
- WEB – 10:36 Semisi Kinikini 1-yard run (David Dellenbach kick). WEB 49–13. Drive: 5 plays, 40 yards, 2:25.
- NWST – 6:18 Zay Davis 38-yard pass from Zach Wilcke (Payne Williams III kick). WEB 49–20. Drive: 10 plays, 75 yards, 4:18.

Statistics	NWST	WEB
First downs	22	24
Plays–yards	87–389	67–441
Rushes–yards	35–98	37–229
Passing yards	291	212
Passing: comp–att–int	26–52–0	14–26–2
Turnovers	0	2
Time of possession	33:26	26:34

Team	Category	Player	Statistics
Northwestern State	Passing	Zach Wilcke	26/52, 291 yards, 3 TD
Northwestern State	Rushing	Zach Wilcke	17 carries, 68 yards
Northwestern State	Receiving	Zay Davis	3 receptions, 66 yards, TD
Weber State	Passing	Nate Dahle	14/26, 178 yards, 2 TD, 2 INT
Weber State	Rushing	Seth Rigtrup	12 carries, 106 yards, 2 TD
Weber State	Receiving	Ammon Munyer	2 receptions, 36 yards, TD

=== Portland State ===
Portland State Vikings (0–4) at Weber State Wildcats (2–2) – Game summary

Quarter	1	2	3	4	Total
Vikings	21	7	10	6	44
Wildcats	7	14	13	7	41

at Stewart Stadium • Ogden, Utah

- Date: September 26
- Game time: 6:00 p.m.
- Game weather: Sunny • Temperature: 75 °F (24 °C) • Wind: W at 4 miles per hour (6.4 km/h)
- Game attendance: 7,478
- Referee: Jim Crowley
- TV announcers (ESPN+): Mike Folta and Riley Jensen

Game information

First quarter

- PRST – 10:17 Delon Thompson 35-yard run (Joshua Hossmann Lees kick). PRST 7–0. Drive: 4 plays, 70 yards, 1:53.
- WEB – 6:46 Seth Rigtrup 31-yard run (David Dellenbach kick). TIED 7–7. Drive: 9 plays, 75 yards, 3:31.
- PRST – 6:32 Zui Shelton 95-yard kickoff return (Joshua Hossmann Lees kick). PRST 14–7.
- PRST – 3:09 Delon Thompson 1-yard run (Joshua Hossmann Lees kick). PRST 21–7. Drive: 5 plays, 18 yards, 1:51.

Second quarter

- PRST – 5:33 Terence Loville 58-yard pass from John-Keawe Sagapolutele (Joshua Hossmann Lees kick). PRST 28–7. Drive: 2 plays, 87 yards, 1:14.
- WEB – 1:34 Marvin Session 31-yard pass from Nate Dahle (David Dellenbach kick). PRST 28–14. Drive: 10 plays, 75 yards, 3:59.
- WEB – 0:19 Marvin Session 80-yard pass from Nate Dahle (David Dellenbach kick). PRST 28–21. Drive: 2 plays, 80 yards, 0:15.

Third quarter

- PRST – 11:47 Joshua Hossmann Lees 42-yard Field Goal. PRST 31–21. Drive: 9 plays, 59 yards, 3:09.
- PRST – 11:03 Delon Thompson 33-yard run (Joshua Hossmann Lees kick). PRST 38–21. Drive: 2 plays, 33 yards, 0:18.
- WEB – 7:04 Marvin Session 27-yard pass from Nate Dahle (kick blocked). PRST 38–27. Drive: 10 plays, 75 yards, 3:59.
- WEB – 5:19 Noah Kjar 16-yard pass from Nate Dahle (David Dellenbach kick). PRST 38–34. Drive: 3 plays, 52 yards, 0:54.

Fourth quarter

- PRST – 3:13 Joshua Hossmann Lees 31-yard Field Goal. PRST 41–34. Drive: 8 plays, 61 yards, 4:47.
- WEB – 1:53 Noah Kjar 30-yard pass from Nate Dahle (David Dellenbach kick). TIED 41–41. Drive: 4 plays, 51 yards, 1:12.
- PRST – 0:00 Joshua Hossmann Lees 41-yard Field Goal. PRST 44–41. Drive: 3 plays, 21 yards, 0:16.

Statistics	PRST	WEB
First downs	16	26
Plays–yards	64–409	84–703
Rushes–yards	39–277	39–239
Passing yards	161	488
Passing: comp–att–int	9–25–1	22–45–3
Turnovers	1	3
Time of possession	25:49	30:48

Team	Category	Player	Statistics
Portland State	Passing	John-Keawe Sagapolutele	9/24, 161 yards, TD, INT
Portland State	Rushing	Delon Thompson	23 carries, 213 yards, 3 TD
Portland State	Receiving	Terence Loville	5 receptions, 130 yards, TD
Weber State	Passing	Nate Dahle	15/27, 338 yards, 5 TD, 2 INT
Weber State	Rushing	Omar Shah	13 carries, 76 yards
Weber State	Receiving	Marvin Session	5 receptions, 175 yards, 3 TD

=== at Cal Poly ===
Weber State Wildcats (2–3) at Cal Poly Mustangs (3–2) – Game summary

Quarter	1	2	3	4	OT	2OT	Total
Wildcats	7	10	7	3	7	8	42
Mustangs	3	6	11	7	7	0	34

at Mustang Memorial Field • San Luis Obispo, California

- Date: October 3
- Game time: 6:00 p.m.
- Game weather: Sunny • Temperature: 84 °F (29 °C) • Wind: NW at 10 miles per hour (16 km/h)
- Game attendance: 11,186
- Referee: Gregg Wilson
- TV announcers (ESPN+): Max Kelton and John Kane

Game information

First quarter

- CP – 10:06 Josue Lopez 37-yard Field Goal. CP 3–0. Drive: 13 plays, 56 yards, 4:54.
- WEB – 3:11 Tate Kjar 39-yard pass from Nate Dahle (David Dellenbach kick). WEB 7–3. Drive: 6 plays, 92 yards, 2:06.

Second quarter

- WEB – 13:14 David Dellenbach 30-yard Field Goal. WEB 10–3. Drive: 4 plays, -8 yards, 1:31.
- CP – 5:33 Alek Marshall 11-yard pass from Anthony Grigsby Jr. (kick failed). WEB 10–9. Drive: 7 plays, 40 yards, 3:25.
- WEB – 0:57 Seth Rigtrup 13-yard run (David Dellenbach kick). WEB 17–9. Drive: 11 plays, 75 yards, 4:36.

Third quarter

- CP – 12:30 Jaden Green 2-yard run (Luke Leighton pass from Anthony Grisgby Jr.). TIED 17–17. Drive: 4 plays, 60 yards, 1:41.
- CP – 7:16 Josue Lopez 22-yard Field Goal. CP 20–17. Drive: 8 plays, 38 yards, 4:00.
- WEB – 1:10 Spencer Ferguson 1-yard run (David Dellenbach kick). WEB 24–20. Drive: 12 plays, 75 yards, 6:06.

Fourth quarter

- CP – 8:53 Fidel Pitts 15-yard pass from Anthony Grigsby Jr. (Josue Lopez kick). CP 27–24. Drive: 5 plays, 85 yards, 2:17.
- WEB – 0:55 David Dellenbach 38-yard Field Goal. TIED 27–27. Drive: 8 plays, 60 yards, 1:12.

Overtime

- CP – 0:00 Jaden Green 3-yard run (Josue Lopez kick kick). CP 34–27. Drive: 4 plays, 25 yards.
- WEB – 0:00 Naye Dahle 25-yard run (David Dellenbach kick). TIED 34–34. Drive: 2 plays, 25 yards.

Double Overtime

- WEB – 0:00 Tate Kjar 9-yard pass from Nate Dahle (Noah Kjar pass from Nate Dahle). WSI 42–34. Drive: 5 plays, 25 yards.

Statistics	WEB	CP
First downs	22	24
Plays–yards	66–371	80–455
Rushes–yards	33–148	53–242
Passing yards	223	213
Passing: comp–att–int	15–33–2	17–27–1
Turnovers	2	1
Time of possession	24:20	35:40

Team	Category	Player	Statistics
Weber State	Passing	Nate Dahle	15/33, 223 yards, 2 TD, 2 INT
Weber State	Rushing	Nate Dahle	15 carries, 85 yards
Weber State	Receiving	Tate Kjar	5 receptions, 89 yards, 2 TD
Cal Poly	Passing	Anthony Grigsby Jr.	17/27, 213 yards, 2 TD, INT
Cal Poly	Rushing	Jaden Green	31 carries, 75 yards, 2 TD
Cal Poly	Receiving	Ray Hall	4 receptions, 86 yards

=== Idaho ===
Idaho Vandals (1–4) at Weber State Wildcats (3–3) – Game summary

Quarter	1	2	3	4	Total
Vandals	0	7	7	13	27
Wildcats	14	0	3	21	38

at Stewart Stadium • Ogden, Utah

- Date: October 10
- Game time: 1:00 p.m.
- Game weather: Cloudy, Multiple Lightning Delays • Temperature: 72 °F (22 °C) • Wind: S 14 mph (23 km/h)
- Game attendance: 5,785
- Referee: Spencer Mumford
- TV announcers (KJZZ/KMYU): Dave Fox, Alema Harrington, and Frank Dolce

Game information

First quarter

- WEB – 14:49 Spencer Ferguson 75-yard run (David Dellenbach kick). WEB 7–0. Drive: 1 plays, 75 yards, 0:11.
- WEB – 3:39 Seth Rigtrup 6-yard run (David Dellenbach kick). WEB 14–0. Drive: 13 plays, 78 yards, 6:31.

Second quarter

- IDHO – 12:36 Noah West-Baranco 19-yard pass from Joshua Wood (Owen Forsman kick). WEB 14–7. Drive: 11 plays, 75 yards, 6:03.

Third quarter

- WEB – 8:18 David Dellenbach 25-yard Field Goal. WEB 17–7. Drive: 9 plays, 41 yards, 4:58.
- IDHO – 2:00 Tony Harste 39-yard pass from Joshua Wood (Owen Forsman kick). WEB 17–14. Drive: 3 plays, 39 yards, 0:18.

Fourth quarter

- WEB – 14:41 Noah Kjar 14-yard pass from Nate Dahle (David Dellenbach kick). WEB 24–14. Drive: 2 plays, 14 yards, 0:09.
- IDHO – 8:15 Ryan Jezioro 13-yard pass from Joshua Wood (Owen Forsman kick). WEB 24–21. Drive: 12 plays, 65 yards, 6:16.
- WEB – 7:12 Seth Rigtrup 16-yard run (David Dellenbach kick). WEB 31–21. Drive: 3 plays, 75 yards, 1:03.
- WEB – 2:46 Spencer Ferguson 2-yard run (David Dellenbach kick). WEB 38–21. Drive: 7 plays, 42 yards, 2:53.
- IDHO – 0:15 Tony Harste 14-yard pass from Joshua Wood (Denzel Peoples interception of Wood pass attempt). WEB 38–27. Drive: 13 plays, 69 yards, 2:24.

Statistics	IDHO	WEB
First downs	25	20
Plays–yards	86–496	55–406
Rushes–yards	34–113	36–307
Passing yards	383	99
Passing: comp–att–int	32–52–2	10–19–1
Turnovers	2	1
Time of possession	37:09	22:51

Team	Category	Player	Statistics
Idaho	Passing	Joshua Wood	32/50, 383 yards, 4 TD, 2 INT
Idaho	Rushing	Joshua Wood	13 carries, 58 yards
Idaho	Receiving	Tony Harste	6 receptions, 96 yards, 2 TD
Weber State	Passing	Nate Dahle	10/19, 99 yards, TD, INT
Weber State	Rushing	Spencer Ferguson	14 carries, 153 yards, 2 TD
Weber State	Receiving	Noah Kjar	5 receptions, 50 yards, TD

=== No. 21 Idaho State ===
No. 21 Idaho State Bengals (4–2) at Weber State Wildcats (4–3) – Game summary

Quarter	1	2	3	4	Total
No. 21 Bengals	7	7	6	0	20
Wildcats	6	0	13	8	27

at Stewart Stadium • Ogden, Utah

- Date: October 17
- Game time: 1:00 p.m.
- Game weather: Sunny • Temperature: 62 °F (17 °C) • Wind: SE at 9 miles per hour (14 km/h)
- Game attendance: 8,428
- Referee: Justin Robinson
- TV announcers (KJZZ/KMYU): Dave Fox, Alema Harrington, and Frank Dolce

Game information

First quarter

- IDST – 4:52 Trehsyn Fesili 50-yard interception return (Mason Lindberg kick). IDST 7–0. D
- WEB – 0:16 Robert Young 68-yard part return (run failed). IDST 7–6.

Second quarter

- IDST – 3:37 Julian Mason 32-yard pass from Davis Harsin (Mason Lindberg kick). IDST 14–6. Drive: 9 plays, 82 yards, 3:47.

Third quarter

- WEB – 10:37 Seth Rigtrup 2-yard run (run failed). IDST 14–12. Drive: 9 plays, 91 yards, 4:19.
- WEB – 4:54 Noah Kjar 14-yard pass from Nate Dahle (David Dellenbach kick). WEB 19–14. Drive: 9 plays, 69 yards, 4:40.
- IDST – 1:56 Parker Graham 18-yard pass from Jordan Cooke (run failed). IDST 20–19. Drive: 6 plays, 75 yards, 2:58.

Fourth quarter

- WEB – 1:10 Spencer Ferguson 2-yard run (Tate Kjar pass from Nate Dahle). WEB 27–20. Drive: 4 plays, 55 yards, 0:35.

Statistics	IDST	WEB
First downs	19	18
Plays–yards	74–318	71–358
Rushes–yards	37–120	38–185
Passing yards	198	173
Passing: comp–att–int	19–37–1	18–33–1
Turnovers	1	2
Time of possession	30:38	29:22

Team	Category	Player	Statistics
Idaho State	Passing	Davis Harsin	14/27, 145 yards, TD
Idaho State	Rushing	Davis Harsin	20 carries, 93 yards
Idaho State	Receiving	Julian Mason	5 receptions, 82 yards, TD
Weber State	Passing	Nate Dahle	18/33, 173 yards, TD, INT
Weber State	Rushing	Spencer Ferguson	16 carries, 134 yards, TD
Weber State	Receiving	Niah Kjar	4 receptions, 40 yards, TD

=== at No. 3 Montana State ===
No. 22 Weber State Wildcats (5–3) at No. 3 Montana State Bobcats (6–1) – Game summary

Quarter	1	2	3	4	Total
No. 22 Wildcats	0	0	0	0	0
No. 3 Bobcats	0	0	0	0	0

at Bobcat Stadium • Bozeman, Montana

- Date: October 24
- Game time: 1:00 p.m.
- TV announcers (KUPX): Ben Creighton, Ty Gregorak and Grace Lawrence

Game information

First quarter
Second quarter
Third quarter
Fourth quarter

Statistics	WEB	MTST
First downs		
Plays–yards		
Rushes–yards		
Passing yards		
Passing: comp–att–int		
Turnovers		
Time of possession		

Team	Category	Player	Statistics
Weber State	Passing		
Weber State	Rushing		
Weber State	Receiving		
Montana State	Passing		
Montana State	Rushing		
Montana State	Receiving		

=== No. 20 UC Davis ===
No. 20 UC Davis Aggies (5–3) at No. 22 Weber State Wildcats (5–4) – Game summary

Quarter	1	2	3	4	Total
No. 20 Aggies	0	0	0	0	0
No. 22 Wildcats	0	0	0	0	0

at Stewart Stadium • Ogden, Utah

- Date: October 31
- Game time: 1:00 p.m.
- TV announcers (KMYU): Dave Fox, Alema Harrington, and Frank Dolce

Game information

First quarter
Second quarter
Third quarter
Fourth quarter

Statistics	UCD	WEB
First downs		
Plays–yards		
Rushes–yards		
Passing yards		
Passing: comp–att–int		
Turnovers		
Time of possession		

Team	Category	Player	Statistics
UC Davis	Passing		
UC Davis	Rushing		
UC Davis	Receiving		
Weber State	Passing		
Weber State	Rushing		
Weber State	Receiving		

=== at No. 5 Northern Arizona ===
No. 18 Weber State Wildcats (6–4) at No. 5 Northern Arizona Lumberjacks (8–2) – Game summary

Quarter	1	2	3	4	Total
No. 18 Wildcats	0	0	0	0	0
No. 5 Lumberjacks	0	0	0	0	0

at Walkup Skydome • Flagstaff, Arizona

- Date: November 14
- Game time: 3:00 p.m.

Game information

First quarter
Second quarter
Third quarter
Fourth quarter

Statistics	WEB	NAU
First downs		
Plays–yards		
Rushes–yards		
Passing yards		
Passing: comp–att–int		
Turnovers		
Time of possession		

Team	Category	Player	Statistics
Weber State	Passing		
Weber State	Rushing		
Weber State	Receiving		
Northern Arizona	Passing		
Northern Arizona	Rushing		
Northern Arizona	Receiving		

=== Utah Tech ===
Utah Tech Trailblazers (1–10) at No. 15 Weber State Wildcats (7–4) – Game summary

Quarter	1	2	3	4	Total
Trailblazers	0	0	0	0	0
No. 15 Wildcats	0	0	0	0	0

at Stewart Stadium • Ogden, Utah

- Date: November 21
- Game time: 1:00 p.m.
- TV announcers (KJZZ/KMYU): Dave Fox, Alema Harrington, and Frank Dolce

Game information

First quarter
Second quarter
Third quarter
Fourth quarter

Statistics	UTU	WEB
First downs		
Plays–yards		
Rushes–yards		
Passing yards		
Passing: comp–att–int		
Turnovers		
Time of possession		

Team	Category	Player	Statistics
Utah Tech	Passing		
Utah Tech	Rushing		
Utah Tech	Receiving		
Weber State	Passing		
Weber State	Rushing		
Weber State	Receiving		

== Rankings ==
Ranking movements Legend: ██ Increase in ranking ██ Decrease in ranking — = Not ranked RV = Received votes
	Week														
Poll	Pre	1	2	3	4	5	6	7	8	9	10	11	12	13	Final
STATS	—	—	—	—	—	—	—	RV	22	22	18	18	15		
Coaches	—	—	—	—	—	—	—	—	RV	RV	25	20	16		
