= Isaac Asiata =

American football player (born 1992)

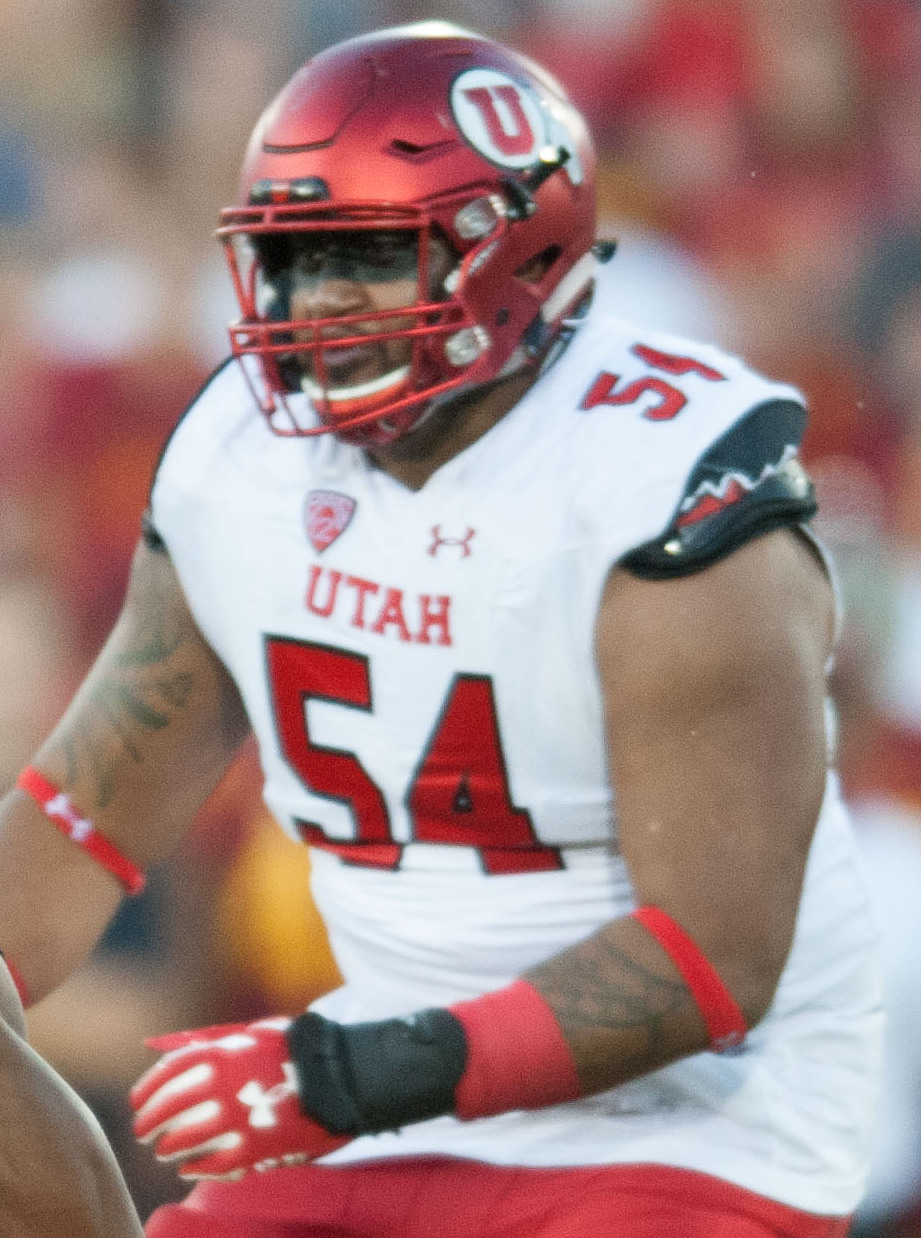
- Asiata with the Utah Utes in 2015

Weber State Wildcats
- Title: Offensive line coach

Personal information
- Born: December 29, 1992 (age 33); Spanish Fork, Utah, U.S.
- Listed height: 6 ft 3 in (1.91 m)
- Listed weight: 345 lb (156 kg)

Career information
- High school: Spanish Fork
- College: Utah (2013–2016)
- NFL draft: 2017: 5th round, 164th overall pick

Career history

Playing
- Miami Dolphins (2017–2018); Buffalo Bills (2019)*
- * Offseason or practice squad member only

Coaching
- Utah (2023–2025) Offensive analyst; Weber State (2026–present) Offensive line coach

Awards and highlights
- Second-team All-Pac-12 (2016); Morris Trophy (2016)

Career NFL statistics
- Games played: 2
- Stats at Pro Football Reference

Isaac Andrew Asiata (born December 29, 1992) is an American former professional football player who was a guard in the National Football League (NFL). He played college football for the Utah Utes.

== College career ==
Asiata was a four-year starter at Utah, played in 45 games. He was a two time All-Pac-12 Conference selection and winner of the Morris Trophy, given to the best lineman in the Pac-12 in 2016. After the end of his collegiate career, he played in the Senior Bowl.

== Professional career ==
Pre-draft measurables
| Height | Weight | Arm length | Hand span | 40-yard dash | 10-yard split | 20-yard split | 20-yard shuttle | Three-cone drill | Vertical jump | Broad jump | Bench press |
|---|---|---|---|---|---|---|---|---|---|---|---|
| 6 ft 3 1/8 in (1.91 m) | 323 lb (147 kg) | 33 3/4 in (0.86 m) | 10 3/8 in (0.26 m) | 5.34 s | 1.85 s | 3.09 s | 4.93 s | 7.83 s | 26.5 in (0.67 m) | 8 ft 7 in (2.62 m) | 35 reps |
All values from 2017 NFL Combine/Pro Day

=== Miami Dolphins ===
Asiata was selected by the Miami Dolphins in the fifth round, 164th overall, in the 2017 NFL draft.

On September 1, 2018, Asiata was waived by the Dolphins and was re-signed to their practice squad the following day. He was promoted to the active roster on November 9.

On May 16, 2019, Asiata was waived/injured by the Dolphins and placed on injured reserve. He was released by the Dolphins on June 6.

=== Buffalo Bills ===
On July 22, 2019, Asiata was signed by the Buffalo Bills. On July 30, Asiata retired from professional football.

== Coaching career ==
On December 31, 2025, Asiata joined Weber State as an offensive line coach under head coach Eric Kjar after previously serving as an assistant offensive line coach at the University of Utah.

== Personal life ==
Isaac served a mission for The Church of Jesus Christ of Latter-day Saints. He is the cousin of NFL running back Matt Asiata. Another cousin, Devaughn Vele, is a wide receiver for the New Orleans Saints. On April 7, 2020, Asiata became a police officer for the city of Provo, Utah
