= 2026 Chicago State Cougars football team =

American college football season

2026 Chicago State Cougars football
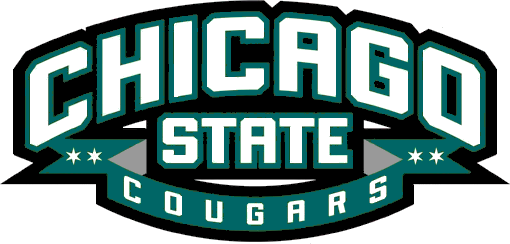
- Conference: Independent
- Record: 3–8
- Head coach: Bobby Rome II (1st season)
- Offensive coordinator: Bobby Blizzard (1st season)
- Defensive coordinator: Le'Marcus Gibson (1st season)
- Home stadium: SeatGeek Stadium

2026 NCAA Division I FCS independents football standings
	Conf.			Overall
Team	W		L	W		L
Merrimack		–		5	–	7
Chicago State		–		3	–	8

The 2026 Chicago State Cougars football team represented Chicago State University as an independent during the 2026 NCAA Division I FCS football season. The Cougars were led by first-year head coach Bobby Rome II and play their home games at SeatGeek Stadium in Bridgeview, Illinois. The 2026 season was the inaugural season for the Chicago State football program.

== Schedule ==
Date	Time	Opponent	Site	TV	Result	Attendance
August 29	12:00 p.m.	Roosevelt	SeatGeek Stadium; Bridgeview, IL	YouTube	L 28–44	1,000
September 5	6:00 p.m.	at UT Martin	Graham Stadium; Martin, TN	ESPN+	L 7–42	3,532
September 12	12:00 p.m.	Kentucky Christian	SeatGeek Stadium; Bridgeview, IL	YouTube	W 78–7	2,000
September 19	12:00 p.m.	at Butler	Bud and Jackie Sellick Bowl; Indianapolis, IN	ESPN+	L 20–47	4,774
September 26	6:00 p.m.	Norfolk State	SeatGeek Stadium; Bridgeview, IL	YouTube	L 20–43	1,543
October 3	6:00 p.m.	at No. 4 Tarleton State	Memorial Stadium; Stephenville, TX	ESPN+	L 21–56	16,121
October 17	11:00 a.m.	at North Carolina A&T	Truist Stadium; Greensboro, NC	FloFootball	L 12–27	3,521
October 24	2:00 p.m.	at Lindenwood	Harlen C. Hunter Stadium; St. Charles, MO	ESPN+	L 9–44	3,322
October 31	2:00 p.m.	Fort Lauderdale^{†}	SeatGeek Stadium; Bridgeview, IL	YouTube	W 80–17	2,554
November 14	12:00 p.m.	VUL	SeatGeek Stadium; Bridgeview, IL	YouTube	W 45–0	1,500
November 21	1:00 p.m.	at Southern Utah	Eccles Coliseum; Cedar City, UT	ESPN+	L 3–65	2,578
^{†}Homecoming; Rankings from STATS Poll released prior to the game; All times are in Central time

== Game summaries ==
=== Roosevelt (DII) ===
Roosevelt Lakers (DII) (0–0) at Chicago State Cougars (0–0) – Game summary

Quarter	1	2	3	4	Total
Lakers (DII)	3	24	10	7	44
Cougars	7	7	7	7	28

at SeatGeek Stadium • Bridgeview, Illinois

- Date: August 29
- Game time: 12:00 p.m.
- Game weather: Sunny • Temperature: 78 °F (26 °C) • Wind: SW at 2 miles per hour (3.2 km/h)
- Game attendance: 1,000
- Referee: Jonathan Grande
- TV: ABC 7 Chicago

Game information

First quarter

- RSWT – Sean Sample 24-yard field goal, 7:55. Lakers 3–0. Drive: 16 plays, 69 yards, 7:05.
- CHST – Michael Dabney Jr. 5-yard run (Donovan Blair kick), 3:30. Cougars 7–3. Drive: 3 plays, 25 yards, 1:08.

Second quarter

- RSWT – Jaden Bossie 19-yard pass from Tony Chahino (Sean Sample kick), 14:11. Lakers 10–7. Drive: 11 plays, 75 yards, 4:19.
- RSWT – Dylan Hendee 5-yard pass from Tony Chahino (Sean Sample kick), 9:32. Lakers 17–7. Drive: 3 plays, 56 yards, 0:49.
- RSWT – Keron Pryor 28-yard interception return (Sean Sample kick), 8:55. Lakers 24–7.
- CHST – Kymari Gray 27-yard pass from Ashton Pannell (Donovan Blair kick), 4:44. Lakers 24–14. Drive: 8 plays, 35 yards, 4:01.
- RSWT – Sean Sample 22-yard field goal, 0:02. Lakers 27–14. Drive: 5 plays, 29 yards, 0:42.

Third quarter

- RSWT – Jaden Bossie 54-yard run (Fearghal Mac Cearra kick), 11:59. Lakers 34–14. Drive: 3 plays, 65 yards, 0:58.
- RSWT – Sean Sample 23-yard field goal, 7:16. Lakers 37–14. Drive: 5 plays, 19 yards, 2:15.
- CHST – Mark Harris 14-yard pass from Ashton Pannell (Donovan Blair kick), 1:52. Lakers 37–21. Drive: 1 play, 14 yards, 0:04.

Fourth quarter

- RSWT – CJ Hood 27-yard pass from Tony Chahino (Fearghal Mac Cearra kick), 12:58. Lakers 44–21. Drive: 2 plays, 34 yards, 1:02.
- CHST – Arshawn Powell 7-yard pass from Ashton Pannell (Donovan Blair kick), 1:12. Lakers 44–28. Drive: 8 plays, 75 yards, 3:52.

Statistics	RSVT	CHST
First downs	21	21
Plays–yards	62–390	71–387
Rushes–yards	30–154	31–123
Passing yards	236	264
Passing: comp–att–int	20–32–0	29–40–2
Turnovers	1	3
Time of possession	25:42	34:18

Team	Category	Player	Statistics
Roosevelt	Passing	Tony Chahino	20/32, 236 yards, 3 TD
Roosevelt	Rushing	Jaden Bossie	22 carries, 141 yards, TD
Roosevelt	Receiving	Jaden Bossie	5 receptions, 91 yards, TD
Chicago State	Passing	Ashton Pannell	29/40, 264 yards, 3 TD, 2 INT
Chicago State	Rushing	Tre' Hartwell	11 carries, 52 yards
Chicago State	Receiving	Develle Barksdale	6 receptions, 70 yards

=== at UT Martin ===
Chicago State Cougars (0–1) at UT Martin Skyhawks (0–1) – Game summary

Quarter	1	2	3	4	Total
Cougars	7	0	0	0	7
Skyhawks	0	21	0	21	42

at Graham Stadium • Martin, Tennessee

- Date: September 5
- Game time: 6:00 p.m.
- Game weather: Sunny • Temperature: 96 °F (36 °C) • Wind: NE at 2 miles per hour (3.2 km/h)
- Game attendance: 3,532
- Referee: Branden McCain
- TV: ESPN+

Game information

First quarter

- CHST – DeArmond Mathews 6-yard pass from Ashton Pannell (Donovan Blair kick), 7:17. Cougars 7–0. Drive: 10 plays, 57 yards, 6:10.

Second quarter

- UTM – Chris Franklin 4-yard run (Brandon Sims kick), 14:29. Tied 7–7. Drive: 13 plays, 75 yards, 7:48.
- UTM – Tommy Ansley 20-yard run (Brandon Sims kick), 6:31. Skyhawks 14–7. Drive: 12 plays, 76 yards, 5:33.
- UTM – Chris Franklin 1-yard run (Brandon Sims kick), 0:30. Skyhawks 21–7. Drive: 7 plays, 38 yards, 2:36.

Third quarter

- No scoring plays.

Fourth quarter

- UTM – Tommy Ansley 28-yard run (Brandon Sims kick), 14:54. Skyhawks 28–7. Drive: 3 plays, 65 yards, 0:57.
- UTM – Tommy Ansley 1-yard run (Brandon Sims kick), 6:08. Skyhawks 35–7. Drive: 7 plays, 74 yards, 3:39.
- UTM – Jaydon Peete 4-yard run (Brandon Sims kick), 1:01. Skyhawks 42–7. Drive: 6 plays, 68 yards, 2:47.

Statistics	CHST	UTM
First downs	9	25
Plays–yards	60–191	64–477
Rushes–yards	27–38	38–216
Passing yards	153	261
Passing: comp–att–int	20–33–0	17–26–1
Turnovers	0	2
Time of possession	30:41	29:19

Team	Category	Player	Statistics
Chicago State	Passing	Ashton Pannell	20/33, 153 yards, TD
Chicago State	Rushing	Tre' Hartwell	6 carries, 19 yards
Chicago State	Receiving	Kymari Gray	4 receptions, 61 yards
UT Martin	Passing	Tate Surber	16/23, 222 yards, INT
UT Martin	Rushing	Tommy Ansley	16 carries, 106 yards, 3 TD
UT Martin	Receiving	Deuce Oliver	3 receptions, 73 yards

=== Kentucky Christian (NAIA) ===
Kentucky Christian Knights (NAIA) (1–1) at Chicago State Cougars (0–2) – Game summary

Quarter	1	2	3	4	Total
Knights (NAIA)	0	7	0	0	7
Cougars	21	28	7	22	78

at SeatGeek Stadium • Bridgeview, Illinois

- Date: September 12
- Game time: 12:00 p.m.
- Game weather: Sunny • Temperature: 81 °F (27 °C) • Wind: SW at 9 miles per hour (14 km/h)
- Game attendance: 2,000
- Referee: Dave Stewart
- TV: YouTube

Game information

First quarter

- (9:29) CHST – Tre' Hartwell 1-yard run (Drive: 7 plays, 56 yards, 3:26; Chicago State 6–0)
- (7:50) CHST – Kymari Gray 18-yard pass from Ashton Pannell, Tre' Hartwell pass (Drive: 4 plays, 35 yards, 1:36; Chicago State 14–0)
- (2:56) CHST – Chris Edmonds 27-yard run, Donovan Blair kick (Drive: 4 plays, 66 yards, 2:08; Chicago State 21–0)

Second quarter

- (14:56) KCHR – Jalen Briscoe 18-yard pass from Xavier Phillips, Evan McGlothin kick (Drive: 7 plays, 64 yards, 2:58; Chicago State 21–7)
- (8:33) CHST – Chris Edmonds 2-yard run, Donovan Blair kick (Drive: 11 plays, 76 yards, 6:15; Chicago State 28–7)
- (6:32) CHST – Jayden Earley 55-yard interception return, Donovan Blair kick (Chicago State 35–7)
- (0:54) CHST – Kymari Gray 18-yard pass from Ashton Pannell, Donovan Blair kick (Drive: 9 plays, 82 yards, 3:00; Chicago State 42–7)
- (0:19) CHST – Chris Edmonds 17-yard pass from Ashton Pannell, Donovan Blair kick (Drive: 2 plays, 35 yards, 0:18; Chicago State 49–7)

Third quarter

- (10:28) CHST – Chris Edmonds 1-yard run, Donovan Blair kick (Drive: 10 plays, 75 yards, 4:32; Chicago State 56–7)

Fourth quarter

- (14:43) CHST – Team safety (Chicago State 58–7)
- (7:58) CHST – Lesroy Tittle 24-yard interception return (Chicago State 64–7)
- (6:19) CHST – Calvin Lee 3-yard run, Donovan Blair kick (Drive: 1 play, 3 yards, 0:06; Chicago State 71–7)
- (5:19) CHST – Seth Myers 33-yard pass from Jacob Tiberi, Donovan Blair kick (Drive: 1 play, 33 yards, 0:06; Chicago State 78–7)

Statistics	KCHR	CHST
First downs	16	23
Plays–yards	65–229	67–580
Rushes–yards	29–62	31–174
Passing yards	167	406
Passing: comp–att–int	18–36–3	31–36–0
Turnovers	4	0
Time of possession	29:28	30:32

Team	Category	Player	Statistics
Kentucky Christian	Passing	Xavier Phillips	16/32, 148 yards, TD, 3 INT
Kentucky Christian	Rushing	Jamareon Dale	9 carries, 84 yards
Kentucky Christian	Receiving	Jamareon Dale	3 receptions, 42 yards
Chicago State	Passing	Ashton Pannell	22/25, 308 yards, 3 TD
Chicago State	Rushing	Tre' Hartwell	11 carries, 70 yards, TD
Chicago State	Receiving	Kymari Gray	7 receptions, 111 yards, 2 TD

=== at Butler ===
Chicago State Cougars (1–2) at Butler Bulldogs (2–1) – Game summary

Quarter	1	2	3	4	Total
Cougars	6	8	0	6	20
Bulldogs	23	7	0	17	47

at Bud and Jackie Sellick Bowl • Indianapolis, Indiana

- Date: September 19
- Game time: 12:00 p.m.
- Game weather: Mostly Cloudy • Temperature: 84 °F (29 °C) • Wind: NW at 7 miles per hour (11 km/h)
- Game attendance: 4,774
- Referee: Grant Henderson
- TV announcers (ESPN+): Andrew Mild (play-by-play) and Eva Hallman (analyst)

Game information

First quarter

- (12:41) BUT – Gabe Passini 9-yard run, Beck Janki kick (Drive: 2 plays, 8 yards, 0:50; Butler 7–0)
- (11:00) BUT – Snap out the back of the end zone (Butler 9–0)
- (10:04) BUT – Nick Munson 32-yard pass from Gabe Passini, Beck Janki kick (Drive: 2 plays, 35 yards, 0:50; Butler 16–0)
- (8:48) CHST – Chris Edmonds 74-yard run, Donovan Blair kick blocked (Drive: 3 plays, 83 yards, 1:11; Butler 16–6)
- (4:33) BUT – Drew Sullivan 16-yard pass from Gabe Passini, Beck Janki kick (Drive: 7 plays, 58 yards, 4:09; Butler 23–6)

Second quarter

- (10:32) CHST – Arshawn Powell 11-yard pass from Ashton Pannell, Jack Roland pass from Ashton Pannell (Drive: 10 plays, 67 yards, 4:16; Butler 23–14)
- (1:57) BUT – Sam Manna 1-yard run, Beck Janki kick (Drive: 8 plays, 75 yards, 2:22; Butler 30–14)

Third quarter

No scoring plays

Fourth quarter

- (12:13) BUT – Evan Windley 45-yard field goal (Drive: 7 plays, 6 yards, 3:59; Butler 33–14)
- (11:22) CHST – Chris Edmonds 77-yard pass from Ashton Pannell, two-point conversion failed (Drive: 2 plays, 79 yards, 0:45; Butler 33–20)
- (7:01) BUT – Michael Nix 14-yard pass from Gabe Passini, Beck Janki kick (Drive: 3 plays, 17 yards, 1:43; Butler 40–20)
- (5:25) BUT – Desmin Jackson 72-yard run, Beck Janki kick (Drive: 1 play, 72 yards, 0:13; Butler 47–20)

Statistics	CHST	BUT
First downs	13	15
Plays–yards	58–301	63–366
Rushes–yards	32–121	40–257
Passing yards	180	109
Passing: comp–att–int	16–26–0	12–23–0
Turnovers	3	0
Time of possession	27:32	32:28

Team	Category	Player	Statistics
Chicago State	Passing	Ashton Pannell	16/26, 180 yards, 2 TD
Chicago State	Rushing	Chris Edmonds	9 carries, 88 yards, TD
Chicago State	Receiving	Chris Edmonds	3 receptions, 74 yards, TD
Butler	Passing	Gabe Passini	12/23, 109 yards, 3 TD
Butler	Rushing	Desmin Jackson	15 carries, 164 yards, TD
Butler	Receiving	Nick Munson	3 receptions, 42 yards, TD

=== Norfolk State ===
Norfolk State Spartans (2–2) at Chicago State Cougars (1–3) – Game summary

Quarter	1	2	3	4	Total
Spartans	0	0	0	0	0
Cougars	0	0	0	0	0

at SeatGeek Stadium • Bridgeview, Illinois

- Date: September 26
- Game time: 6:00 p.m.

Game information

First quarter
Second quarter
Third quarter
Fourth quarter

Statistics	NORF	CHST
First downs		
Plays–yards		
Rushes–yards		
Passing yards		
Passing: comp–att–int		
Turnovers		
Time of possession		

Team	Category	Player	Statistics
Norfolk State	Passing		
Norfolk State	Rushing		
Norfolk State	Receiving		
Chicago State	Passing		
Chicago State	Rushing		
Chicago State	Receiving		

=== at No. 4 Tarleton State ===
Chicago State Cougars (1–4) at No. 4 Tarleton State Texans (4–0) – Game summary

Quarter	1	2	3	4	Total
Cougars	0	0	0	0	0
No. 4 Texans	0	0	0	0	0

at Memorial Stadium • Stephenville, Texas

- Date: October 3
- Game time: 6:00 p.m.
- TV: ESPN+

Game information

First quarter
Second quarter
Third quarter
Fourth quarter

Statistics	CHST	TAR
First downs		
Plays–yards		
Rushes–yards		
Passing yards		
Passing: comp–att–int		
Turnovers		
Time of possession		

Team	Category	Player	Statistics
Chicago State	Passing		
Chicago State	Rushing		
Chicago State	Receiving		
Tarleton State	Passing		
Tarleton State	Rushing		
Tarleton State	Receiving		

=== at North Carolina A&T ===
Chicago State Cougars (1–5) at North Caroina A&T Aggies (2–5) – Game summary

Quarter	1	2	3	4	Total
Cougars	0	0	0	0	0
Aggies	0	0	0	0	0

at Truist Stadium • Greensboro, North Carolina

- Date: October 17
- Game time: 12:00 p.m.

Game information

First quarter
Second quarter
Third quarter
Fourth quarter

Statistics	CHST	NCAT
First downs		
Plays–yards		
Rushes–yards		
Passing yards		
Passing: comp–att–int		
Turnovers		
Time of possession		

Team	Category	Player	Statistics
Chicago State	Passing		
Chicago State	Rushing		
Chicago State	Receiving		
North Carolina A&T	Passing		
North Carolina A&T	Rushing		
North Carolina A&T	Receiving		

=== at Lindenwood ===
Chicago State Cougars (1–6) at Lindenwood Lions (2–4) – Game summary

Quarter	1	2	3	4	Total
Cougars	0	0	0	0	0
Lions	0	0	0	0	0

at Harlen C. Hunter Stadium • St. Charles, Missouri

- Date: October 24
- Game time: 2:00 p.m.

Game information

First quarter
Second quarter
Third quarter
Fourth quarter

Statistics	CHST	LIN
First downs		
Plays–yards		
Rushes–yards		
Passing yards		
Passing: comp–att–int		
Turnovers		
Time of possession		

Team	Category	Player	Statistics
Chicago State	Passing		
Chicago State	Rushing		
Chicago State	Receiving		
Lindenwood	Passing		
Lindenwood	Rushing		
Lindenwood	Receiving		

=== Fort Lauderdale (NCCAA) ===
Fort Lauderdale Eagles (NCCAA) (2–6) at Chicago State Cougars (1–7) – Game summary

Quarter	1	2	3	4	Total
Eagles (NCCAA)	0	0	0	0	0
Cougars	0	0	0	0	0

at SeatGeek Stadium • Bridgeview, Illinois

- Date: October 31

Game information

First quarter
Second quarter
Third quarter
Fourth quarter

Statistics	UFTL	CHST
First downs		
Plays–yards		
Rushes–yards		
Passing yards		
Passing: comp–att–int		
Turnovers		
Time of possession		

Team	Category	Player	Statistics
Fort Lauderdale	Passing		
Fort Lauderdale	Rushing		
Fort Lauderdale	Receiving		
Chicago State	Passing		
Chicago State	Rushing		
Chicago State	Receiving		

=== VUL (NCCAA) ===
VUL Dragons (NCCAA) (0–0) at Chicago State Cougars (2–7) – Game summary

Quarter	1	2	3	4	Total
Dragons (NCCAA)	0	0	0	0	0
Cougars	0	0	0	0	0

at SeatGeek Stadium • Bridgeview, Illinois

- Date: November 14

Game information

First quarter
Second quarter
Third quarter
Fourth quarter

Statistics	VUL	CHST
First downs		
Plays–yards		
Rushes–yards		
Passing yards		
Passing: comp–att–int		
Turnovers		
Time of possession		

Team	Category	Player	Statistics
VUL	Passing		
VUL	Rushing		
VUL	Receiving		
Chicago State	Passing		
Chicago State	Rushing		
Chicago State	Receiving		

=== at Southern Utah ===
Chicago State Cougars (3–7) at Southern Utah Thunderbirds (5–6) – Game summary

Quarter	1	2	3	4	Total
Cougars	0	0	0	0	0
Thunderbirds	0	0	0	0	0

at Eccles Coliseum • Cedar City, Utah

- Date: November 21
- Game time: 1:00 p.m.

Game information

First quarter
Second quarter
Third quarter
Fourth quarter

Statistics	CHST	SUU
First downs		
Plays–yards		
Rushes–yards		
Passing yards		
Passing: comp–att–int		
Turnovers		
Time of possession		

Team	Category	Player	Statistics
Chicago State	Passing		
Chicago State	Rushing		
Chicago State	Receiving		
Southern Utah	Passing		
Southern Utah	Rushing		
Southern Utah	Receiving		
