= Thomas Sydeski =

American football coach (born 1994)

Current position
- Title: Head coach
- Team: Mercyhurst
- Conference: NEC
- Record: 1–4

Biographical details
- Born: December 18, 1994 (age 31); Rochester, New York, U.S.

Playing career
- 2013–2014: Stonehill
- 2015: Hobart
- 2016–2017: Hartwick
- Position: Quarterback

Coaching career (HC unless noted)
- 2018: Old Dominion (OQC)
- 2018: FIU (OQC)
- 2019–2022: Bryant (QB)
- 2023: West Georgia (co-OC/QB)
- 2024–2025: Mercyhurst (OC/QB)
- 2026–present: Mercyhurst

Head coaching record
- Overall: 1–4

Thomas Sydeski (born December 18, 1994) is an American college football coach currently serving as head coach of the Mercyhurst Lakers. He played college football for the Stonehill Skyhawks, Hobart Statesmen and Hartwick Hawks. He has served as a coach for the Old Dominion Monarchs, FIU Panthers, Bryant Bulldogs and West Georgia Wolves.

== Early life ==
Sydeski is from Brockport, New York. He attended Brockport High School where he played football as a quarterback, earning first-team all-county twice and second-team All-Greater Rochester honors. He won two league division championships and was team captain in 2012, leading his team to a record of 16–2 in his last two years. Overall, Sydeski threw for 4,017 yards and 45 touchdowns in high school. After high school, he signed to play college football for the Stonehill Skyhawks.

Sydeski played in no games as a true freshman in 2013, then posted 1,166 passing yards and seven touchdowns while playing in five games in 2014. He transferred to the Hobart Statesmen in 2015 and threw for 349 yards and three touchdowns in one year there. He then transferred to the Hartwick Hawks in 2016, starting one game in 2016 and then throwing for 193 yards in three games as a senior in 2017. Sydeski graduated from Hartwick with a Bachelor of Business Administration in 2017.

== Coaching career ==
Sydeski served as the offensive quality control coordinator for quarterbacks for the Old Dominion Monarchs in the summer of 2018 before serving the regular season of 2018 as offensive quality control coordinator for the offensive line for the FIU Panthers. He then served as quarterbacks coach for the Bryant Bulldogs from 2019 to 2022 before joining the West Georgia Wolves in 2023 as co-offensive coordinator and quarterbacks coach.

In 2024, Sydeski became offensive coordinator and quarterbacks coach for the Mercyhurst Lakers. He helped the team's offense post a Northeast Conference-best 29.5 points per game in 2024, followed by an average of 18.8 points per game in 2025, placing fourth in the conference. After the departure of Ryan Riemedio in 2026, Sydeski was promoted to be the new head coach of the Lakers, becoming one of the youngest head coaches at the NCAA Division I FCS level at 31 years old.

== Head coaching record ==
Year	Team	Overall	Conference	Standing	Bowl/playoffs
Mercyhurst Lakers (NEC) (2026–present)
2026	Mercyhurst	1–4	0–0		
Mercyhurst:		1–4	0–0		
Total:		1–4			
