= Jack McDaniels =

American football coach (born 1998)

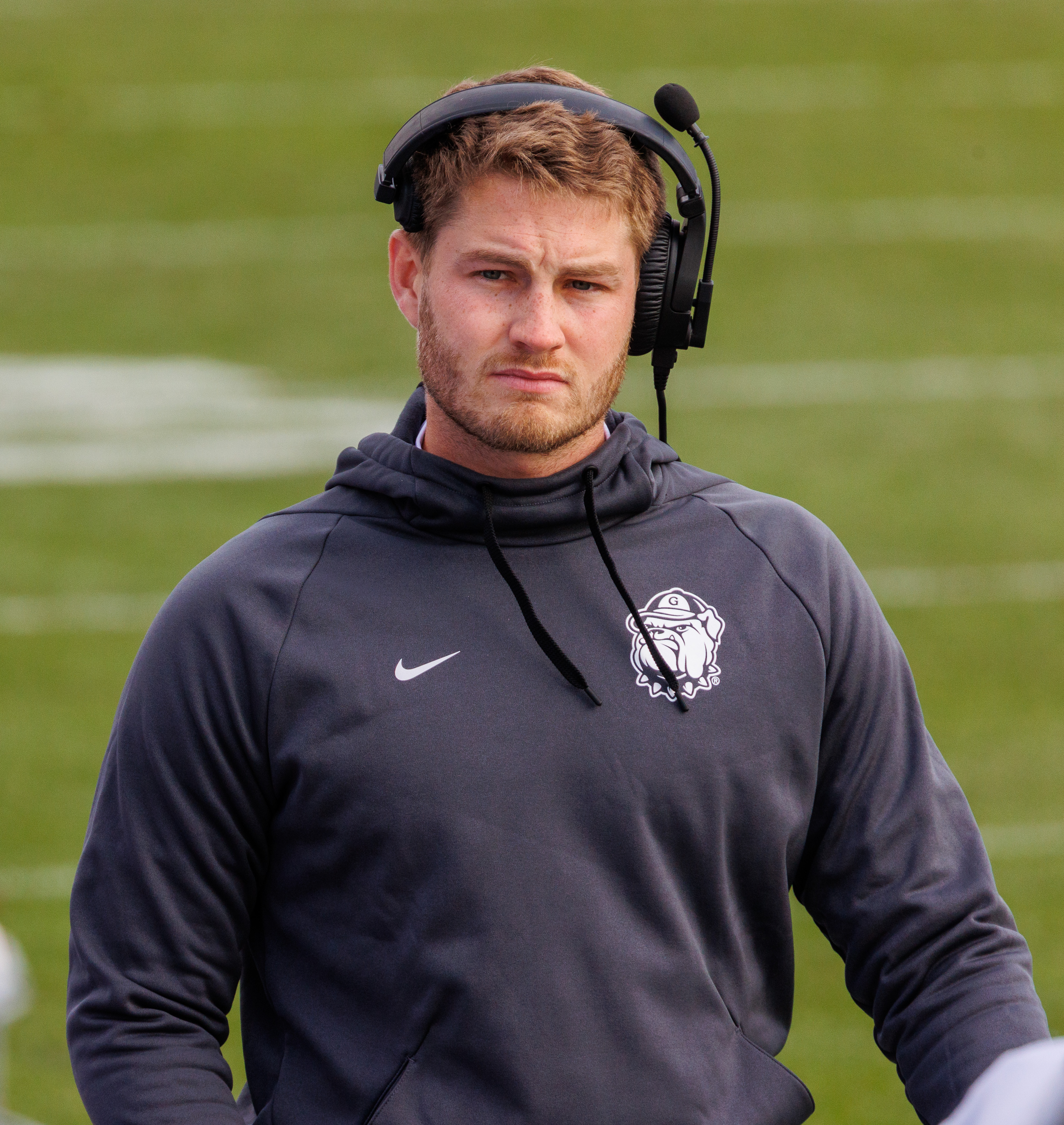

Current position
- Title: OC/QB
- Team: Georgetown
- Conference: Patriot

Biographical details
- Born: December 21, 1998 (age 27)
- Education: University of West Alabama

Playing career
- 2017–2018: Delaware State
- 2019–2021: West Alabama
- Position: Quarterback

Coaching career (HC unless noted)
- 2021 (Winter): West Alabama (GA)
- 2022: Georgetown (TE)
- 2023: Georgetown (QB)
- 2024: Georgetown (PGC/QB/RC)
- 2025 (Summer): Tampa Bay Buccaneers (QB Coaching Fellow)
- 2025: Central Michigan (Sr. Offensive Analyst)
- 2026–Present: Georgetown (OC/QB)

Accomplishments and honors

Awards
- OurCoachingNetwork – (2023, 2025 – 30under30),

Jack McDaniels (born December 21, 1998) is an American football coach and former quarterback who is currently the Offensive Coordinator and Quarterback Coach at Georgetown University. McDaniels also has FBS experience at Central Michigan as the Senior Offensive Analyst. He played college football at Delaware State and West Alabama.

== Playing career ==
Jack McDaniels was the starting quarterback at Delaware State University for two years and the University of West Alabama for three years.

As a true freshman at Delaware State, McDaniels helped snapped a two-year losing streak, and win consecutive games for the first time in four seasons. McDaniels played under former FBS assistant coach, Kenny Carter, as well as Delaware State alum and former Super Bowl Champ, Rod Milstead.

After two seasons with Delaware State, McDaniels transferred to Division-II West Alabama. There, McDaniels led the Tigers to Top-10 National Rankings (D-II) and a top ranked national offense. At West Alabama, McDaniels played for UWA alum Head Coach Brett Gilliland and former FBS Offensive Coordinator Don Bailey.

In total, McDaniels started 47 career games, accumulated more than 9,000 total yards and 90 touchdowns.

== Coaching career ==
=== West Alabama ===
Immediately after his playing career ended in the fall of 2021, McDaniels joined the West Alabama staff as an Offensive Graduate Assistant.

=== Georgetown University (First Stint) ===
McDaniels joined the Georgetown coaching staff in February 2022 as the Tight Ends Coach. At the age of 23, McDaniels was the youngest full-time D-1 position coach in the country. In his first season at Georgetown, the Tight Ends saw a 50% increase in receptions. McDaniels also ran the kickoff-return unit. The kickoff-return unit led the Patriot League in all statistical categories and was nationally ranked in many.

In January 2023, McDaniels was elevated to Quarterbacks Coach at Georgetown University. In his first season as Quarterbacks Coach, Georgetown more than doubled their win total, tying for the most improved team in the conference. McDaniels also helped Georgetown win the biggest game in program history over #14 (FCS) Fordham University, the program's first win over a ranked opponent in the modern era. McDaniels tutored first year starting quarterback, Tyler Knoop, to over 2,500 total yards, 64% completions and 21 total touchdowns. Due to injury, McDaniels started Redshirt Freshman quarterback Danny Lauter against #19 (FCS) Lafayette. In his first career start, McDaniels helped Lauter to 428 passing yards (program record) and three touchdowns. McDaniels was selected to the OurCoachingNetwork 30under30 list, as well as winning the OurCoachingNetwork Week 7 FCS QB Coach of the Week Award.

In 2024, McDaniels was elevated to Pass Game Coordinator, Recruiting Coordinator, and Quarterback's Coach for the 2024 season. McDaniels helped the Hoyas defeat school rival, Columbia, for the first time since 2019. In two years coaching the quarterbacks, McDaniels aided Georgetown to the most wins against D1 teams in a two-year span since 2011–2012.

=== Tampa Bay Buccaneers ===
In May 2025, McDaniels was selected to participate in the National Coaching Academy with the Tampa Bay Buccaneers as a QB Coaching Fellow.

=== Central Michigan University ===
In June 2025, McDaniels was hired by Matt Drinkall and Jim Chapin as Senior Offensive Analyst at Central Michigan.

=== Georgetown University (Second Stint) ===
McDaniels was rehired by Rob Sgarlata as the Offensive Coordinator / Quarterback of Georgetown in March 2026.

== Personal life ==
Jack is the younger brother of Jeff McDaniels, former Davidson College Wide Receiver and current Offensive Analyst at Cal.
