= Bobby Rome II =

American football coach (born 1986)

Current position
- Title: Head coach
- Team: Chicago State
- Conference: FCS independent
- Record: 0–1

Biographical details
- Born: April 29, 1986 (age 40); Norfolk, Virginia, U.S.
- Education: University of North Carolina at Chapel Hill (2009)

Playing career
- 2006–2009: North Carolina
- 2010: Green Bay Packers*
- 2010: Las Vegas Locomotives
- 2010: Pittsburgh Steelers*
- 2011: Las Vegas Locomotives
- 2012: Moscow Patriots
- 2013: Moscow State
- Positions: Fullback, quarterback

Coaching career (HC unless noted)
- 2010: Norfolk Christian (VA) (co-OC/QB)
- 2012: Carolina Force (interim HC)
- 2013: Saint Petersburg State (AHC)
- 2013–2016: Far Eastern Federal
- 2016–2017: North Carolina (club)
- 2018–2019: Virginia–Lynchburg
- 2020–2021: Central State (OH)
- 2022–2024: Florida Memorial
- 2026–present: Chicago State

Administrative career (AD unless noted)
- 2018–2019: Virginia–Lynchburg

Head coaching record
- Overall: 19–37–1 (college); 3–3 (AIF)

Accomplishments and honors

Championships
- 1 UFL (2010)

Bobby Rome II (born April 29, 1986) is an American college football coach. He is the head football coach for Chicago State University, a position he has held since 2025. He was the head football coach for the Carolina Force of the American Indoor Football (AIF) in 2012, Far Eastern Federal University from 2013 to 2016, the Virginia University of Lynchburg from 2018 to 2019, Central State University from 2020 to 2021, and Florida Memorial University from 2022 to 2024. He also coached for Norfolk Christian Schools, Saint Petersburg State, and the North Carolina club football team. He played college football for North Carolina and Moscow State and professionally for the Green Bay Packers and Pittsburgh Steelers of the National Football League (NFL), the Las Vegas Locomotives of the United Indoor Football (UIF), and the Moscow Patriots of the Eastern European Super League (EESL).

== Head coaching record ==
=== College ===
Year	Team	Overall	Conference	Standing	Bowl/playoffs
Virginia–Lynchburg Dragons (National Christian College Athletic Association) (2018–2019)
2018	Virginia–Lynchburg	3–6			
2019	Virginia–Lynchburg	0–10			
Virginia–Lynchburg:		3–16			
Central State Marauders (Southern Intercollegiate Athletic Conference) (2020–2021)
2020–21	No team—COVID-19				
2021	Central State	1–5 (Note: Rome resigned after six games and George Ragsdale was appointed interim head coach and led the Marauders for the remainder of the season. Central State finished the season with an overall record of 1–9 and a mark of 0–6 in conference play.)	0–4	(West)	
Central State:		1–5	0–4		
Florida Memorial Lions (Sun Conference) (2022–2024)
2022	Florida Memorial	3–7	1–5	6th	
2023	Florida Memorial	6–4	5–2	3rd	
2024	Florida Memorial	6–4–1	4–3	4th	
Florida Memorial:		15–15–1	10–10		
Chicago State Cougars (NCAA Division I FCS independent) (2026–present)
2026	Chicago State	1–2			
Chicago State:		1–2			
Total:		20–38–1			
