= Chicago State Cougars football =

Football team of Chicago State University

2026 Chicago State Cougars football team
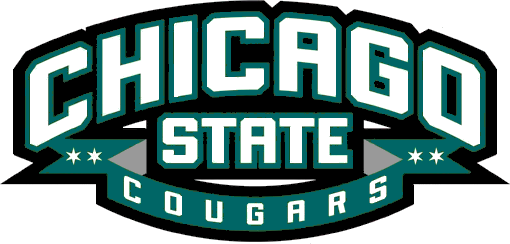
- First season: 2026; 0 years ago
- Athletic director: Monique Carroll
- Head coach: Bobby Rome II; 1st season, 2–7 (.222)
- Location: Bridgeview, Illinois, U.S.
- Stadium: SeatGeek Stadium (capacity: 20,000)
- NCAA division: Division I FCS
- Conference: Independent (2026); Northeast Conference (from 2027)
- Colors: Green and white
- All-time record: 2–7 (.222)
- Website: GoCSUCougars.com

The Chicago State Cougars football team represents Chicago State University at the NCAA Division I Football Championship Subdivision, the second-highest level of college football in the United States. Chicago's only NCAA Division I football program, they will compete as an independent school during the 2026 season, and in the Northeast Conference beginning in the 2027 season.

== Background ==
The team is the only NCAA Division I football program in Chicago. The most recent NCAA Division I football program in Chicago was the 1939 edition of the Chicago Maroons football team representing University of Chicago in the Big Ten Conference. Prior to the establishment of Chicago State, ten schools had started NCAA Division I football programs since 2000, only two of them have been at the Football Championship Subdivision (FCS) level and seven have been in Texas, Georgia or Florida. The most recently created Division I football program in Illinois was the Southern Illinois Salukis football program in 1904, which had its inaugural game on October 4, 1913.

== History ==
In January 2023, Chicago State formed an exploratory committee to pursue Division I football competition. The committee included National Football League veterans Vaughn Bryant, Howard Griffith, Tom Thayer and Otis Wilson, Chicago high school football coaches, community leaders and school officials. In September 2023, Chicago State announced fundraising to expand its athletics program. When Chicago State announced that the Chicago State Cougars would be competing in the Northeast Conference, it was an early step towards launching a football program. Chicago State began its football head coach search in February 2025, hiring Bobby Rome II two months later as its head coach.

The team will compete as an FCS Independent school in the 2026 season, then as a member of the Northeast Conference for the 2027 season. The team's home games are currently scheduled to be played off-campus at SeatGeek Stadium in Bridgeview, Illinois; however, the university included the immediate construction of an on-campus turfed practice field in the initial decision to field a program, with plans to build an on-campus stadium at an undetermined point in the future.

On National Signing Day (February 4, 2026), the team announced its inaugural signing class of 55 athletes.

=== Classifications ===
- 2026–present: NCAA Division I Football Championship Subdivision (FCS)

=== Conference memberships ===
- 2026: NCAA Division I FCS independent
- From 2027: Northeast Conference

== Future non-conference opponents ==
Announced schedules as of May 27, 2026.

2026	2027
Roosevelt (8/29)	North Carolina A&T (9/18)
at UT Martin (9/5)	
Kentucky Christian (9/12)	
at Butler (9/19)	
Norfolk State (9/26)	
at Tarleton State (10/3)	
at North Carolina A&T (10/17)	
at Lindenwood (10/24)	
UFTL (10/31)	
Virginia–Lynchburg (11/14)	
at Southern Utah (11/21)	
