= Ryan Riemedio =

American football coach (born c. 1985)

Current position
- Title: Defensive coordinator & linebackers coach
- Team: Youngstown State University
- Conference: MVFC

Biographical details
- Born: August 6, 1985 (age 41); Seaside, California, U.S.
- Education: Monterey Peninsula College (2007); Minot State University (2009); Mercyhurst University (2014)

Playing career
- 2004–2006: Monterey Peninsula
- 2007–2008: Minot State
- Positions: Linebacker, long snapper

Coaching career (HC unless noted)
- 2009–2011: Monterey Peninsula (DB/LB/DL)
- 2012–2013: Mercyhurst (GA)
- 2014: Mercyhurst (DL)
- 2015–2019: Mercyhurst (STC/DL)
- 2020–2021: Mercyhurst (DC)
- 2022–2025: Mercyhurst
- 2026–present: Youngstown State (DC)

Head coaching record
- Overall: 13–31

Ryan Riemedio (born August 6, 1985) is an American football defensive coordinator for Youngstown State University. He was previously the head football coach for Mercyhurst University, a position he held from 2022 until 2025. He also coached for Monterey Peninsula College. He played college football for Monterey Peninsula College and Minot State as a linebacker and long snapper.

== Personal life ==
Ryan Riemedio was born August 6, 1985, in Seaside, California. Riemedio played for both Monterey Peninsula and Minot State University, in which he graduated with a bachelor's degree in corporate fitness.

== Coaching career ==
Upon graduating from Minot State in 2008, Riemedio was hired as a defensive assistant to Monterey Peninsula in 2009. where he served as the defensive backs, linebackers and defensive line coach. In 2012, he took a job as a graduate's assistant with Mercyhurst, where he worked with tight ends, fullbacks and the offensive line. He would later move up the chain at Mercyhurst, serving as the defensive line coach in 2014, the special teams coordinator and defensive line coach from 2015 until 2019. He was promoted to the defensive coordinator in 2020.

Following the retirement of Marty Schaetzle, Riemedio was hired as Mercyhurst’s next head coach. In his four seasons with the team, Riemedio led the Lakers to a 13–31 record, with his best finished coming in 2025, with the Lakers finished 5–7 overall and 4–3 in the Northeast Conference.

The Youngstown State Penguins hired Riemedio as their next defensive coordinator in January 2026, after fourteen seasons at Mercyhurst.

== Head coaching record ==
Year	Team	Overall	Conference	Standing	Bowl/playoffs
Mercyhurst Lakers (Pennsylvania State Athletic Conference) (2022–2023)
2022	Mercyhurst	2–9	0–7	8th (West)	
2023	Mercyhurst	2–8	1–6	T–6th (West)	
Mercyhurst Lakers (Northeast Conference) (2024–2025)
2024	Mercyhurst	4–7	0–0	N/A	
2025	Mercyhurst	5–7	4–3	T–3rd	
Mercyhurst:		13–31	5–16		
Total:		13–31			
