= Eric Kjar =

American football player and coach (born 1979)

Current position
- Title: Head coach
- Team: Weber State
- Conference: Big Sky
- Record: 0–0

Biographical details
- Born: April 4, 1979 (age 47); Kemmerer, Wyoming, U.S.

Playing career
- 2000–2003: Wayne State
- Positions: Quarterback, wide receiver

Coaching career (HC unless noted)
- 2004–2008: Jordan HS (UT) (assistant)
- 2009–2016: Jordan HS (UT)
- 2017–2025: Corner Canyon HS (UT)
- 2026–present: Weber State

Head coaching record
- Overall: 0–0 (college)

Eric Louis Kjar (born April 4, 1979) is an American college football coach currently serving as head coach of the Weber State Wildcats. He previously coached at Jordan High School and Corner Canyon High School.

== Early life ==
Kjar is from Kemmerer, Wyoming. He attended Kemmerer High School where he played three sports and was a quarterback in football. He later attended Snow College in Utah before transferring to Wayne State College in Nebraska, where he played four seasons for the Wayne State Wildcats as a quarterback and then wide receiver. He met his wife, Andrea, while attending Snow College, and they have four children. Kjar received a bachelor's degree in education from Wayne State in 2004.

== Coaching career ==
After Kjar graduated from Wayne State, he became an assistant football coach at Jordan High School in Utah in 2004. He then was promoted to head coach in 2009. In 2010, he led them to the 5A semifinals despite having been recently diagnosed with multiple sclerosis. He served eight season as head coach at Jordan, winning a state title in 2012 while finishing with an overall record of 69–29. He then became head coach of Corner Canyon High School in 2017, serving there through 2025. As Corner Canyon coach, he led the team to a state record 48-straight wins from 2018 to 2021 while also winning six state championships (2018, 2019, 2020, 2023, 2024, 2025) and appearing in the 2025 national championship. Across his eight years at Corner Canyon, Kjar compiled a record of 112–10. He developed several future NFL players at Corner Canyon, including quarterbacks Zach Wilson and Jaxson Dart.

On December 16, 2025, Kjar was named the new coach of the Weber State Wildcats.
