= 2026 Montana State Bobcats football team =

American college football season

2026 Montana State Bobcats football
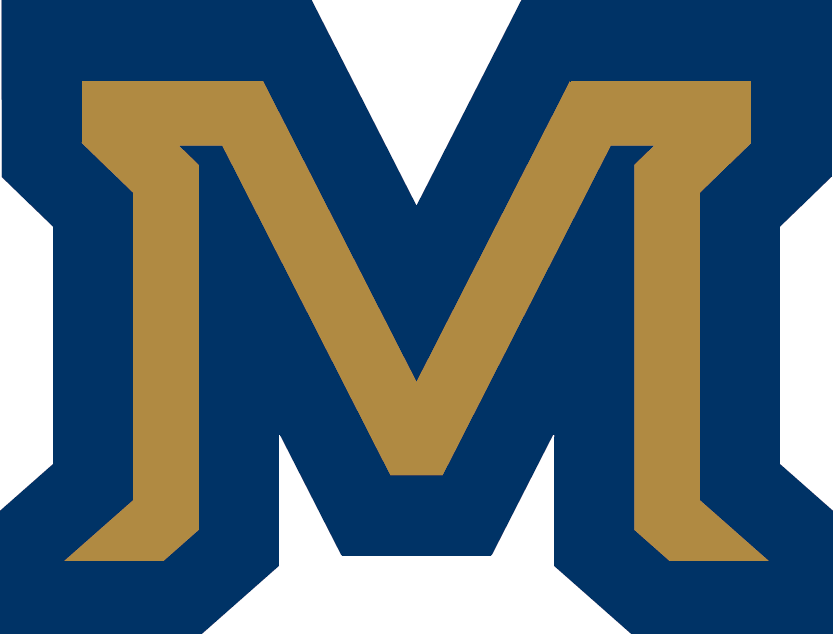

Big Sky champion

FCS Playoffs
- Conference: Big Sky Conference

Ranking
- STATS: No. 2
- FCS Coaches: No. 2
- Record: 11–1 (8–1 Big Sky)
- Head coach: Brent Vigen (6th season)
- Offensive coordinator: Pete Sterbick (2nd season)
- Offensive scheme: Pro spread
- Defensive coordinator: Bobby Daly (3rd season)
- Base defense: 4–2–5
- Home stadium: Bobcat Stadium

2026 Big Sky Conference football standings
| | Conf. | | | Overall |
| Team | W | | L | W | | L |
|---|---|---|---|---|---|---|
| No. 2 Montana State $^ | 8 | – | 1 | 11 | – | 1 |
| No. 15 Weber State ^ | 7 | – | 2 | 8 | – | 4 |
| No. 12 Northern Arizona ^ | 7 | – | 2 | 9 | – | 3 |
| No. 8 Montana ^ | 6 | – | 3 | 8 | – | 4 |
| No. 23 UC Davis | 6 | – | 3 | 8 | – | 4 |
| Idaho | 5 | – | 4 | 5 | – | 7 |
| Southern Utah | 4 | – | 4 | 6 | – | 6 |
| No. 25 Idaho State ^ | 4 | – | 5 | 7 | – | 5 |
| Cal Poly | 3 | – | 6 | 4 | – | 8 |
| Portland State | 3 | – | 6 | 3 | – | 9 |
| Eastern Washington | 2 | – | 7 | 3 | – | 9 |
| Northern Colorado | 2 | – | 7 | 3 | – | 9 |
| Utah Tech | 1 | – | 8 | 1 | – | 11 |
$ – Conference champion; ^ – FCS playoff participant; As of November 22, 2026; Rankings from STATS Poll

The 2026 Montana State Bobcats football team represents Montana State University as a member of the Big Sky Conference during the 2026 NCAA Division I FCS football season. The Bobcats are led by sixth-year head coach Brent Vigen and play their home games at Bobcat Stadium in Bozeman, Montana.

== Schedule ==
| Date | Time | Opponent | Rank | Site | TV | Result | Attendance |
|---|---|---|---|---|---|---|---|
| August 29 | 8:00 p.m. | at Utah Tech | No. 1 | Greater Zion Stadium; St. George, UT | ESPN+ | W 54–0 | 6,412 |
| September 5 | 6:30 p.m. | Butler* | No. 1 | Bobcat Stadium; Bozeman, MT | ESPN+ | W 51–24 | 22,277 |
| September 12 | 8:30 p.m. | at Nevada* | No. 1 | Mackay Stadium; Reno, NV | The CW | W 20–7 | 21,679 |
| September 19 | 1:00 p.m. | Central Connecticut* | No. 1 | Bobcat Stadium; Bozeman, MT | ESPN+ | W 35–30 | 21,557 |
| September 26 | 8:30 p.m. | No. 18 Northern Arizona^{†} | No. 1 | Bobcat Stadium; Bozeman, MT | ESPN2 | W 28–14 | 21,857 |
| October 2 | 8:30 p.m. | at Idaho | No. 1 | Kibbie Dome; Moscow, ID | ESPN | L 34–35 | 9,231 |
| October 17 | 5:00 p.m. | at Eastern Washington | No. 5 | Roos Field; Cheney, WA | ESPN+ | W 56–20 | 5,318 |
| October 24 | 1:00 p.m. | No. 22 Weber State | No. 3 | Bobcat Stadium; Bozeman, MT | ESPN+ | W 38–33 | 22,167 |
| October 31 | 1:00 p.m. | Cal Poly | No. 3 | Bobcat Stadium; Bozeman, MT | ESPN+ | W 61–7 | 21,897 |
| November 7 | 3:00 p.m. | at No. 22 Idaho State | No. 3 | ICCU Dome; Pocatello, ID | ESPN+ | W 28–26 ^{3OT} | 9,578 |
| November 14 | 5:00 p.m. | at Northern Colorado | No. 2 | Nottingham Field; Greeley, CO | ESPN+ | W 31–21 | 5,319 |
| November 21 | 12:00 p.m. | No. 8 Montana | No. 2 | Bobcat Stadium; Bozeman, MT (rivalry) | ESPN+ | W 42–16 | 22,277 |
| December 5 | TBA | Harvard/Monmouth* | | Bobcat Stadium; Bozeman, MT (NCAA Division I Second Round) | | | |
*Non-conference game; ^{†}Homecoming; Rankings from STATS Poll released prior to the game; All times are in Mountain time

== Rankings ==
Ranking movements Legend: ██ Increase in ranking ██ Decrease in ranking ( ) = First-place votes
| | Week | | | | | | | | | | | | | | |
| Poll | Pre | 1 | 2 | 3 | 4 | 5 | 6 | 7 | 8 | 9 | 10 | 11 | 12 | 13 | Final |
|---|---|---|---|---|---|---|---|---|---|---|---|---|---|---|---|
| STATS | 1 (57) | 1 (57) | 1 (57) | 1 (57) | 1 (46) | 1 (49) | 6 | 5 | 3 (3) | 3 (3) | 3 (7) | 2 (6) | 2 (5) | | |
| Coaches | 1 (25) | 1 (26) | 1 (25) | 1 (26) | 1 (25) | 1 (25) | 6 | 5 | 3 | 3 | 3 | 2 | 2 | | |

== Game summaries ==
=== at Utah Tech ===
No. 1 Montana State Bobcats (0–0) at Utah Tech Trailblazers (0–0) – Game summary

| Quarter | 1 | 2 | 3 | 4 | Total |
|---|---|---|---|---|---|
| No. 1 Bobcats | 10 | 16 | 14 | 14 | 54 |
| Trailblazers | 0 | 0 | 0 | 0 | 0 |

at Greater Zion Stadium • St. George, Utah

- Date: August 29
- Game time: 8:00 p.m.
- Game weather: Sunny • Temperature: 97 °F (36 °C) • Wind: SW at 17 miles per hour (27 km/h)
- Game attendance: 6,412
- Referee: Gregg Wilson
- TV announcers (ESPN+): Ben Creighton, Ty Gregorak and Grace Lawrence

Game information

First quarter

- MTST – Dane Steel 55-yard pass from Justin Lamson (Myles Sansted kick), 5:39. Bobcats 7–0. Drive: 4 plays, 82 yards, 1:58.
- MTST – Myles Sansted 47-yard field goal, 0:00. Bobcats 10–0. Drive: 7 plays, 17 yards, 3:28.

Second quarter

- MTST – Xavier Ahrens 16-yard blocked punt return (Myles Sansted kick), 14:04. Bobcats 17–0.
- MTST – Adam Jones 2-yard run (Myles Sansted kick BLOCKED), 4:18. Bobcats 23–0. Drive: 10 plays, 58 yards, 5:27.
- MTST – Myles Sansted 33-yard field goal, 0:33. Bobcats 26–0. Drive: 12 plays, 43 yards, 2:40.

Third quarter

- MTST – Rylan Schlepp 3-yard pass from Justin Lamson (Myles Sansted kick), 10:51. Bobcats 33–0. Drive: 8 plays, 75 yards, 4:02.
- MTST – Justin Lamson 6-yard run (Myles Sansted kick), 5:06. Bobcats 40–0. Drive: 9 plays, 48 yards, 4:27.

Fourth quarter

- MTST – Carter Dahlke 25-yard pass from Patrick Duchien (Myles Sansted kick), 12:44. Bobcats 47–0. Drive: 9 plays, 59 yards, 5:10.
- MTST – Brendon Ross 28-yard interception return (Myles Sansted kick), 11:50. Bobcats 54–0.

| Statistics | MTST | UTU |
|---|---|---|
| First downs | 24 | 12 |
| Plays–yards | 71–447 | 59–227 |
| Rushes–yards | 35–140 | 26–58 |
| Passing yards | 307 | 169 |
| Passing: comp–att–int | 27–36–0 | 19–33–2 |
| Turnovers | 0 | 2 |
| Time of possession | 35:20 | 24:40 |

| Team | Category | Player | Statistics |
|---|---|---|---|
| Montana State | Passing | Justin Lamson | 22/30, 260 yards, 2 TD |
| Montana State | Rushing | Adam Jones | 11 carries, 35 yards, TD |
| Montana State | Receiving | Dane Steel | 8 receptions, 174 yards, TD |
| Utah Tech | Passing | CJ Tiller | 10/12, 91 yards |
| Utah Tech | Rushing | Bronson Barben | 6 carries, 21 yards |
| Utah Tech | Receiving | Mike Williams | 4 receptions, 42 yards |

=== Butler ===
Butler Bulldogs (1–0) at No. 1 Montana State Bobcats (1–0) – Game summary

| Quarter | 1 | 2 | 3 | 4 | Total |
|---|---|---|---|---|---|
| Bulldogs | 3 | 0 | 14 | 7 | 24 |
| No. 1 Bobcats | 10 | 20 | 7 | 14 | 51 |

at Bobcat Stadium • Bozeman, Montana

- Date: September 5
- Game time: 6:30 p.m.
- Game weather: Sunny • Temperature: 70 °F (21 °C) • Wind: SE at 9 miles per hour (14 km/h)
- Game attendance: 22,277
- Referee: Spencer Mumford
- TV announcers (ESPN+): Ben Creighton (play-by-play), Ty Gregorak (analyst) and Toni Wetmore (sideline)
- Box Score

Game information

First quarter

- (6:05) MTST – Myles Sansted 45-yard field goal (Drive: 11 plays, 72 yards, 4:28; Montana State 3–0)
- (0:25) BUT – Beck Janki 34-yard field goal (Drive: 10 plays, 58 yards, 5:40; Tied 3–3)
- (0:11) MTST – Jabez Woods 100-yard kickoff return, Myles Sansted kick (Montana State 10–3)

Second quarter

- (4:41) MTST – Adam Jones 1-yard run, two-point conversion failed (Drive: 7 plays, 75 yards, 3:29; Montana State 16–3)
- (1:47) MTST – Justin Lamson 1 yard run, Myles Sansted kick (Drive: 5 plays, 42 yards, 1:08; Montana State 23–3)
- (0:22) MTST – Dane Steel 29-yard pass from Justin Lamson, Myles Sansted kick (Drive: 2 plays, 40 yards, 0:17; Montana State 30–3)

Third quarter

- (13:19) MTST – Taco Dowler 20-yard pass from Justin Lamson, Myles Sansted kick (Drive: 4 plays, 75 yards, 1:41; Montana State 37–3)
- (5:33) BUT – Nick Munson 3-yard pass from Gabe Passini, Beck Janki kick (Drive: 12 plays, 65 yards, 7:46; Montana State 37–10)
- (4:04) BUT – Desmin Jackson 1-yard run, Beck Janki kick (Drive: 2 plays, 25 yards, 0:49; Montana State 37–17)

Fourth quarter

- (14:19) MTST – Jared White 2-yard run, Myles Sansted kick (Drive: 10 plays, 75 yards, 4:45; Montana State 44–17)
- (6:24) MTST – Jabez Woods 35-yard pass from Patrick Duchien, Myles Sansted kick (Drive: 7 plays, 80 yards, 3:26; Montana State 51–17)
- (0:37) BUT – Jarrin Alley 1-yard run, Beck Janki kick (Drive: 13 plays, 75 yards, 5:47; Montana State 51–24)

| Statistics | BUT | MTST |
|---|---|---|
| First downs | 16 | 25 |
| Plays–yards | 61–273 | 57–498 |
| Rushes–yards | 36–83 | 30–166 |
| Passing yards | 190 | 332 |
| Passing: comp–att–int | 19–25–0 | 20–27–1 |
| Turnovers | 0 | 1 |
| Time of possession | 35:07 | 24:53 |

| Team | Category | Player | Statistics |
|---|---|---|---|
| Butler | Passing | Gabe Passini | 14/19, 140 yards, TD |
| Butler | Rushing | Michael Dellumo | 10 carries, 23 yards |
| Butler | Receiving | Chet Yardley | 3 receptions, 55 yards |
| Montana State | Passing | Justin Lamson | 15/20, 239 yards, 2 TD |
| Montana State | Rushing | Adam Jones | 13 carries, 77 yards, TD |
| Montana State | Receiving | Taco Dowler | 5 receptions, 97 yards, TD |

=== at Nevada (FBS) ===
No. 1 Montana State Bobcats (2–0) at Nevada Wolf Pack (FBS) (1–0) – Game summary

| Quarter | 1 | 2 | 3 | 4 | Total |
|---|---|---|---|---|---|
| No. 1 Bobcats | 10 | 7 | 0 | 3 | 20 |
| Wolf Pack (FBS) | 0 | 0 | 0 | 7 | 7 |

at Mackay Stadium • Reno, Nevada

- Date: September 12
- Game time: 8:30 p.m.
- Game weather: Clear • Temperature: 70 °F (21 °C) • Wind: NE at 13 miles per hour (21 km/h)
- Game attendance: 21,679
- Referee: Brad Carrell
- TV announcers (The CW): Jack McMullen, Cody Kessler and Marshall Newhouse

Game information

First quarter

- MTST – Dane Steel 24-yard pass from Justin Lamson (Myles Sansted kick), 12:05. Bobcats 7–0. Drive: 7 plays, 75 yards, 2:55.
- MTST – Myles Sansted 45-yard field goal, 1:35. Bobcats 10–0. Drive: 8 plays, 49 yards, 2:40.

Second quarter

- MTST – Adam Jones 6-yard run (Myles Sansted kick), 5:39. Bobcats 17–0. Drive: 10 plays, 79 yards, 5:29.

Third quarter

- No scoring plays.

Fourth quarter

- NEV – Marshaun Brown 28-yard pass from AJ Bianco (Joe McFadden kick), 11:38. Bobcats 17–7. Drive: 8 plays, 65 yards, 3:00.
- MTST – Myles Sansted 29-yard field goal, 1:10. Bobcats 20–7. Drive: 7 plays, 11 yards, 3:39.

| Statistics | MTST | NEV |
|---|---|---|
| First downs | 21 | 22 |
| Plays–yards | 63–330 | 71–349 |
| Rushes–yards | 40–151 | 35–182 |
| Passing yards | 179 | 167 |
| Passing: comp–att–int | 15–23–0 | 19–36–3 |
| Turnovers | 0 | 4 |
| Time of possession | 32:42 | 27:18 |

| Team | Category | Player | Statistics |
|---|---|---|---|
| Montana State | Passing | Justin Lamson | 15/23, 179 yards, TD |
| Montana State | Rushing | Adam Jones | 25 carries, 86 yards, TD |
| Montana State | Receiving | Taco Dowler | 4 receptions, 44 yards |
| Nevada | Passing | AJ Bianco | 12/20, 116 yards, TD, INT |
| Nevada | Rushing | Dominic Kelley | 17 carries, 84 yards |
| Nevada | Receiving | Marshaun Brown | 3 receptions, 44 yards, TD |

=== Central Connecticut ===
Central Connecticut Blue Devils (0–2) at No. 1 Montana State Bobcats (3–0) – Game summary

| Quarter | 1 | 2 | 3 | 4 | Total |
|---|---|---|---|---|---|
| Blue Devils | 0 | 7 | 14 | 9 | 30 |
| No. 1 Bobcats | 0 | 7 | 14 | 14 | 35 |

at Bobcat Stadium • Bozeman, Montana

- Date: September 19
- Game time: 1:00 p.m.
- TV: ESPN+

Game information

First quarter
Second quarter
Third quarter
Fourth quarter

| Statistics | CCSU | MTST |
|---|---|---|
| First downs | | |
| Plays–yards | | |
| Rushes–yards | | |
| Passing yards | | |
| Passing: comp–att–int | | |
| Turnovers | | |
| Time of possession | | |

| Team | Category | Player | Statistics |
|---|---|---|---|
| Central Connecticut | Passing | | |
| Central Connecticut | Rushing | | |
| Central Connecticut | Receiving | | |
| Montana State | Passing | | |
| Montana State | Rushing | | |
| Montana State | Receiving | | |

=== No. 18 Northern Arizona ===
No. 18 Northern Arizona Lumberjacks (3–1) at No. 1 Montana State Bobcats (4–0) – Game summary

| Quarter | 1 | 2 | 3 | 4 | Total |
|---|---|---|---|---|---|
| No. 18 Lumberjacks | 0 | 0 | 0 | 0 | 0 |
| No. 1 Bobcats | 0 | 0 | 0 | 0 | 0 |

at Bobcat Stadium • Bozeman, Montana

- Date: September 26
- Game time: 8:30 p.m.
- TV announcers (ESPN2): Ted Emrich and Fozzy Whittaker

Game information

First quarter
Second quarter
Third quarter
Fourth quarter

| Statistics | NAU | MTST |
|---|---|---|
| First downs | | |
| Plays–yards | | |
| Rushes–yards | | |
| Passing yards | | |
| Passing: comp–att–int | | |
| Turnovers | | |
| Time of possession | | |

| Team | Category | Player | Statistics |
|---|---|---|---|
| Northern Arizona | Passing | | |
| Northern Arizona | Rushing | | |
| Northern Arizona | Receiving | | |
| Montana State | Passing | | |
| Montana State | Rushing | | |
| Montana State | Receiving | | |

=== at Idaho ===
No. 1 Montana State Bobcats (5–0) at Idaho Vandals (0–4) – Game summary

| Quarter | 1 | 2 | 3 | 4 | Total |
|---|---|---|---|---|---|
| No. 1 Bobcats | 10 | 14 | 3 | 7 | 34 |
| Vandals | 7 | 13 | 0 | 15 | 35 |

at Kibbie Dome • Moscow, Idaho

- Date: October 2
- Game time: 8:30 p.m.
- Game weather: None (played indoors)
- Game attendance: 9,231
- Referee: Justin Robinson
- TV announcers (ESPN): Courtney Lyle (play-by-play) and Rene Ingoglia (analyst)

Game information
First quarter
- MTST – Myles Sansted 21-yard field goal, 11:09. Montana State 3–0. Drive: 10 plays, 62 yards, 3:44.
- IDHO – Ryan Jezioro 75-yard pass from Joshua Wood (Owen Forsman kick), 10:57. Idaho 7–3. Drive: 1 play, 75 yards, 0:12.
- MTST – Carter Dahlke 20-yard pass from Patrick Duchien (Myles Sansted kick), 5:37. Montana State 10–7. Drive: 4 plays, 58 yards, 1:46.

Second quarter

- IDHO – Owen Forsman 45-yard field goal, 13:06. Idaho 10–10. Drive: 13 plays, 48 yards, 7:31.
- IDHO – Owen Forsman 22-yard field goal, 9:50. Idaho 13–10. Drive: 5 plays, 28 yards, 1:53.
- MTST – Jared White 32-yard run (Myles Sansted kick), 7:11. Montana State 17–13. Drive: 6 plays, 65 yards, 2:39.
- IDHO – Damonte Bias 15-yard run (Owen Forsman kick), 2:22. Idaho 20–17. Drive: 9 plays, 75 yards, 4:49.
- MTST – Dane Steel 15-yard pass from Patrick Duchien (Myles Sansted kick), 1:12. Montana State 24–20. Drive: 9 plays, 75 yards, 1:10.

Third quarter

- MTST – Myles Sansted 26-yard field goal, 3:20. Montana State 27–20. Drive: 15 plays, 73 yards, 8:24.

Fourth quarter

- MTST – Patrick Duchien 2-yard run (Myles Sansted kick), 13:29. Montana State 34–20. Drive: 6 plays, 38 yards, 1:46.
- IDHO – Joshua Wood 1-yard run (Owen Forsman kick), 9:54. Idaho 27–34. Drive: 6 plays, 75 yards, 3:35.
- IDHO – Ryan Jezioro 25-yard pass from Joshua Wood (Joshua Wood rush), 0:00. Idaho 35–34. Drive: 5 plays, 80 yards, 0:49.

| Statistics | MTST | IDHO |
|---|---|---|
| First downs | 29 | 23 |
| Plays–yards | 74–469 | 58–443 |
| Rushes–yards | 42–220 | 33–128 |
| Passing yards | 249 | 315 |
| Passing: comp–att–int | 23–32–0 | 19–25–0 |
| Turnovers | 0 | 1 |
| Time of possession | 31:32 | 28:28 |

| Team | Category | Player | Statistics |
|---|---|---|---|
| Montana State | Passing | Patrick Duchien | 23/32, 249 yards, 2 TD |
| Montana State | Rushing | Patrick Duchien | 14 carries, 92 yards, TD |
| Montana State | Receiving | Carter Dahlke | 10 receptions, 126 yards, TD |
| Idaho | Passing | Joshua Wood | 19/25, 315 yards, 2 TD, INT |
| Idaho | Rushing | Damonte Bias | 7 carries, 46 yards, TD |
| Idaho | Receiving | Ryan Jezioro | 6 receptions, 147 yards, 2 TD |

=== at Eastern Washington ===
No. 5 Montana State Bobcats (5–1) at Eastern Washington Eagles (2–5) – Game summary

| Quarter | 1 | 2 | 3 | 4 | Total |
|---|---|---|---|---|---|
| No. 5 Bobcats | 0 | 0 | 0 | 0 | 0 |
| Eagles | 0 | 0 | 0 | 0 | 0 |

at Roos Field • Cheney, Washington

- Date: October 17
- Game time: 5:00 p.m.

Game information

First quarter
Second quarter
Third quarter
Fourth quarter

| Statistics | MTST | EWU |
|---|---|---|
| First downs | | |
| Plays–yards | | |
| Rushes–yards | | |
| Passing yards | | |
| Passing: comp–att–int | | |
| Turnovers | | |
| Time of possession | | |

| Team | Category | Player | Statistics |
|---|---|---|---|
| Montana State | Passing | | |
| Montana State | Rushing | | |
| Montana State | Receiving | | |
| Eastern Washington | Passing | | |
| Eastern Washington | Rushing | | |
| Eastern Washington | Receiving | | |

=== No. 22 Weber State ===
No. 22 Weber State Wildcats (5–3) at No. 3 Montana State Bobcats (6–1) – Game summary

| Quarter | 1 | 2 | 3 | 4 | Total |
|---|---|---|---|---|---|
| No. 22 Wildcats | 0 | 0 | 0 | 0 | 0 |
| No. 3 Bobcats | 0 | 0 | 0 | 0 | 0 |

at Bobcat Stadium • Bozeman, Montana

- Date: October 24
- Game time: 1:00 p.m.

Game information

First quarter
Second quarter
Third quarter
Fourth quarter

| Statistics | WEB | MTST |
|---|---|---|
| First downs | | |
| Plays–yards | | |
| Rushes–yards | | |
| Passing yards | | |
| Passing: comp–att–int | | |
| Turnovers | | |
| Time of possession | | |

| Team | Category | Player | Statistics |
|---|---|---|---|
| Weber State | Passing | | |
| Weber State | Rushing | | |
| Weber State | Receiving | | |
| Montana State | Passing | | |
| Montana State | Rushing | | |
| Montana State | Receiving | | |

=== Cal Poly ===
Cal Poly Mustangs (4–5) at No. 3 Montana State Bobcats (7–1) – Game summary

| Quarter | 1 | 2 | 3 | 4 | Total |
|---|---|---|---|---|---|
| Mustangs | 0 | 0 | 0 | 0 | 0 |
| No. 3 Bobcats | 0 | 0 | 0 | 0 | 0 |

at Bobcat Stadium • Bozeman, Montana

- Date: October 31
- Game time: 1:00 p.m.

Game information

First quarter
Second quarter
Third quarter
Fourth quarter

| Statistics | CP | MTST |
|---|---|---|
| First downs | | |
| Plays–yards | | |
| Rushes–yards | | |
| Passing yards | | |
| Passing: comp–att–int | | |
| Turnovers | | |
| Time of possession | | |

| Team | Category | Player | Statistics |
|---|---|---|---|
| Cal Poly | Passing | | |
| Cal Poly | Rushing | | |
| Cal Poly | Receiving | | |
| Montana State | Passing | | |
| Montana State | Rushing | | |
| Montana State | Receiving | | |

=== at No. 22 Idaho State ===
No. 3 Montana State Bobcats (8–1) at No. 22 Idaho State Bengals (6–3) – Game summary

| Quarter | 1 | 2 | 3 | 4 | Total |
|---|---|---|---|---|---|
| No. 3 Bobcats | 0 | 0 | 0 | 0 | 0 |
| No. 22 Bengals | 0 | 0 | 0 | 0 | 0 |

at ICCU Dome • Pocatello, Idaho

- Date: November 7
- Game time: 3:00 p.m.

Game information

First quarter
Second quarter
Third quarter
Fourth quarter

| Statistics | MTST | IDST |
|---|---|---|
| First downs | | |
| Plays–yards | | |
| Rushes–yards | | |
| Passing yards | | |
| Passing: comp–att–int | | |
| Turnovers | | |
| Time of possession | | |

| Team | Category | Player | Statistics |
|---|---|---|---|
| Montana State | Passing | | |
| Montana State | Rushing | | |
| Montana State | Receiving | | |
| Idaho State | Passing | | |
| Idaho State | Rushing | | |
| Idaho State | Receiving | | |

=== at Northern Colorado ===
No. 2 Montana State Bobcats (9–1) at Northern Colorado Bears (3–7) – Game summary

| Quarter | 1 | 2 | 3 | 4 | Total |
|---|---|---|---|---|---|
| No. 2 Bobcats | 0 | 0 | 0 | 0 | 0 |
| Bears | 0 | 0 | 0 | 0 | 0 |

at Nottingham Field • Greeley, Colorado

- Date: November 14
- Game time: 12:00 p.m.

Game information

First quarter
Second quarter
Third quarter
Fourth quarter

| Statistics | MTST | UNCO |
|---|---|---|
| First downs | | |
| Plays–yards | | |
| Rushes–yards | | |
| Passing yards | | |
| Passing: comp–att–int | | |
| Turnovers | | |
| Time of possession | | |

| Team | Category | Player | Statistics |
|---|---|---|---|
| Montana State | Passing | | |
| Montana State | Rushing | | |
| Montana State | Receiving | | |
| Northern Colorado | Passing | | |
| Northern Colorado | Rushing | | |
| Northern Colorado | Receiving | | |

=== No. 8 Montana (Brawl of the Wild) ===
No. 8 Montana Grizzlies (8–3) at No. 2 Montana State Bobcats (10–1) – Game summary

| Quarter | 1 | 2 | 3 | 4 | Total |
|---|---|---|---|---|---|
| No. 8 Grizzlies | 0 | 0 | 0 | 0 | 0 |
| No. 2 Bobcats | 0 | 0 | 0 | 0 | 0 |

at Bobcat Stadium • Bozeman, Montana

- Date: November 21
- Game time: 12:00 p.m.

Game information

First quarter
Second quarter
Third quarter
Fourth quarter

| Statistics | MONT | MTST |
|---|---|---|
| First downs | | |
| Plays–yards | | |
| Rushes–yards | | |
| Passing yards | | |
| Passing: comp–att–int | | |
| Turnovers | | |
| Time of possession | | |

| Team | Category | Player | Statistics |
|---|---|---|---|
| Montana | Passing | | |
| Montana | Rushing | | |
| Montana | Receiving | | |
| Montana State | Passing | | |
| Montana State | Rushing | | |
| Montana State | Receiving | | |
