= 2026 Idaho State Bengals football team =

American college football season

2026 Idaho State Bengals football

FCS Playoffs
- Conference: Big Sky Conference

Ranking
- STATS: No. 25
- FCS Coaches: No. 25
- Record: 7–5 (4–5 Big Sky)
- Head coach: Cody Hawkins (4th season)
- Co-offensive coordinators: Buddy Blevins (3rd season); John Hughes (1st season)
- Offensive scheme: Run and shoot
- Defensive coordinator: Grant Duff (2nd season)
- Base defense: Multiple
- Home stadium: ICCU Dome

2026 Big Sky Conference football standings
	Conf.			Overall
Team	W		L	W		L
No. 2 Montana State $^	8	–	1	11	–	1
No. 15 Weber State ^	7	–	2	8	–	4
No. 12 Northern Arizona ^	7	–	2	9	–	3
No. 8 Montana ^	6	–	3	8	–	4
No. 23 UC Davis	6	–	3	8	–	4
Idaho	5	–	4	5	–	7
Southern Utah	4	–	4	6	–	6
No. 25 Idaho State ^	4	–	5	7	–	5
Cal Poly	3	–	6	4	–	8
Portland State	3	–	6	3	–	9
Eastern Washington	2	–	7	3	–	9
Northern Colorado	2	–	7	3	–	9
Utah Tech	1	–	8	1	–	11
$ – Conference champion; ^ – FCS playoff participant; As of November 22, 2026; Rankings from STATS Poll

The 2026 Idaho State Bengals football team currently represent Idaho State University as they are a member of the Big Sky Conference during the 2026 NCAA Division I FCS football season. Led by fourth-year head coach Cody Hawkins, the Bengals play their home games on campus at the ICCU Dome in Pocatello, Idaho.

The Big Sky Conference released its preseason prediction poll on July 20, 2026; ISU was picked to finish fourth by the media poll and fifth by the coaches poll.

== Schedule ==
Date	Time	Opponent	Rank	Site	TV	Result	Attendance
August 29	4:00 p.m.	VMI*		ICCU Dome; Pocatello, ID	ESPN+	W 38–10	5,526
September 5	5:00 p.m.	at Utah State*	No. 23	Maverik Stadium; Logan, UT	CBSSN	W 29–17	20,723
September 12	4:00 p.m.	San Diego*	No. 17	ICCU Dome; Pocatello, ID	ESPN+	W 59–17	6,574
September 26	6:00 p.m.	at Southern Utah	No. 14	Eccles Coliseum; Cedar City, UT	ESPN+	W 28–24	6,255
October 3	6:00 p.m.	No. 19 Northern Arizona	No. 12	ICCU Dome; Pocatello, ID	ESPN+	L 31–38	6,878
October 10	4:00 p.m.	Cal Poly^{†}	No. 16	ICCU Dome; Pocatello, ID	ESPN+	L 24–25	9,483
October 17	1:00 p.m.	at Weber State	No. 21	Stewart Stadium; Ogden, UT	KJZZ	L 20–27	8,428
October 24	4:00 p.m.	Portland State		ICCU Dome; Pocatello, ID	ESPN+	W 38–8	5,747
October 31	1:00 p.m.	at Utah Tech	No. 23	Greater Zion Stadium; St. George, UT	ESPN+	W 34–27	2,991
November 7	4:00 p.m.	No. 3 Montana State	No. 22	ICCU Dome; Pocatello, ID	ESPN+	L 26–28 ^{3OT}	9,578
November 14	8:30 p.m.	at No. 12 Montana	No. 21	Washington–Grizzly Stadium; Missoula, MT	ESPN or ESPN2	L 30–38	5,319
November 21	4:00 p.m.	Idaho	No. 25	ICCU Dome; Pocatello, ID (rivalry)	ESPN+	W 19–5	9,888
*Non-conference game; ^{†}Homecoming; Rankings from STATS Poll released prior to the game; All times are in Mountain time

== Rankings ==
Ranking movements Legend: ██ Increase in ranking ██ Decrease in ranking RV = Received votes
	Week														
Poll	Pre	1	2	3	4	5	6	7	8	9	10	11	12	13	Final
STATS	RV	23	17	16	14	12	16	21	RV	23	22	21	25		
Coaches	RV	RV	24	18	16	14	17	21	RV	23	19	21	25		

== Game summaries ==
=== VMI ===
VMI Keydets (0–0) at Idaho State Bengals (0–0) – Game summary

Quarter	1	2	3	4	Total
Keydets	0	0	0	10	10
Bengals	3	7	28	0	38

at ICCU Dome • Pocatello, Idaho

- Date: August 29
- Game time: 4:00 p.m.
- Game weather: none (played indoors)
- Game attendance: 5,526
- Referee: Jim Crowley
- TV announcers (ESPN+): Scott Gross and Mitch Beckstead

Game information

First quarter

- IDST – Mason Lindberg 38-yard field goal, 11:09. Bengals 3–0. Drive: 5 plays, 11 yards, 1:27.

Second quarter

- IDST – Julian Mason 9-yard pass from Jordan Cooke (Mason Lindberg kick), 0:27. Bengals 10–0. Drive: 4 plays, 51 yards, 0:56.

Third quarter

- IDST – Chedon James 49-yard pass from Jordan Cooke (Mason Lindberg kick), 13:22. Bengals 17–0. Drive: 6 plays, 75 yards, 1:38.
- IDST – Noa Calaycay 6-yard blocked punt return (Mason Lindberg kick), 11:06. Bengals 24–0.
- IDST – Zedekiah Anahu-Ambrosio 83-yard pass from Jordan Cooke (Mason Lindberg kick), 6:34. Bengals 31–0. Drive: 2 plays, 90 yards, 0:44.
- IDST – Eli Aragon 38-yard pass from Jordan Cooke (Mason Lindberg kick), 5:17. Bengals 38–0. Drive: 1 play, 38 yards, 0:07.

Fourth quarter

- VMI – Chander Wilson 31-yard run (Jack Joyce kick), 7:11. Bengals 38–7. Drive: 2 plays, 78 yards, 0:54.
- VMI – Jack Joyce 23-yard field goal, 1:57. Bengals 38–10. Drive: 5 plays, 28 yards, 2:04.

Statistics	VMI	IDST
First downs	10	18
Plays–yards	61–240	64–454
Rushes–yards	52–229	25–88
Passing yards	11	366
Passing: comp–att–int	5–9–0	23–39–2
Turnovers	1	2
Time of possession	34:59	25:01

Team	Category	Player	Statistics
VMI	Passing	JoJo Crump	3/7, 16 yards
VMI	Rushing	Chandler Wilson	7 carries, 62 yards, TD
VMI	Receiving	Cade Cox	1 reception, 6 yards
Idaho State	Passing	Jordan Cooke	18/29, 325 yards, 4 TD, INT
Idaho State	Rushing	Dason Brooks	5 carries, 24 yards
Idaho State	Receiving	Eli Aragon	7 receptions, 97 yards, TD

=== at Utah State (FBS) ===
No. 23 Idaho State Bengals (1–0) at Utah State Aggies (FBS) (0–0) – Game summary

Quarter	1	2	3	4	Total
No. 23 Bengals	6	10	3	10	29
Aggies (FBS)	7	3	7	0	17

at Maverik Stadium • Logan, Utah

- Date: September 5
- Game time: 5:00 p.m.
- Game weather: Sunny • Temperature: 83 °F (28 °C)
- Game attendance: 20,723
- Referee: Chris Wiggins
- TV announcers (CBSSN): Jordan Kent, Robert Turbin and Hailey Sutton

Game information

First quarter

- IDST – Mason Lindberg 38-yard field goal, 9:04. Bengals 3–0. Drive: 14 plays, 64 yards, 5:56.
- USU – Eli Wood 15-yard pass from McCae Hillstead (Kian Afrookhteh kick), 5:52. Aggies 7–3. Drive: 8 plays, 75 yards, 3:12.
- IDST – Mason Lindberg 48-yard field goal, 1:57. Aggies 7–6. Drive: 9 plays, 44 yards, 3:55.

Second quarter

- IDST – Jordan Cooke 1-yard run (Mason Lindberg kick), 8:23. Bengals 13–7. Drive: 11 plays, 71 yards, 5:00.
- IDST – Mason Lindberg 25-yard field goal, 6:42. Bengals 16–7. Drive: 4 plays, -3 yards, 1:21.
- USU – Kian Afrookhteh 28-yard field goal, 0:04. Bengals 16–10. Drive: 16 plays, 67 yards, 4:14.

Third quarter

- USU – Demick Starling 4-yard pass from McCae Hillstead (Kian Afrookhteh kick), 4:39. Aggies 17–16. Drive: 4 plays, 24 yards, 1:07.
- IDST – Mason Lindberg 43-yard field goal, 0:26. Bengals 19–17. Drive: 9 plays, 49 yards, 3:13.

Fourth quarter

- IDST – Chedon James 8-yard pass from Jordan Cooke (Mason Lindberg kick), 14:13. Bengals 26–17. Drive: 3 plays, 3 yards, 1:06.
- IDST – Mason Lindberg 41-yard field goal, 4:39. Bengals 29–17. Drive: 4 plays, 24 yards, 1:40.

Statistics	IDST	USU
First downs	14	29
Plays–yards	63–241	88–407
Rushes–yards	30–89	44–162
Passing yards	152	245
Passing: comp–att–int	18–33–0	20–44–4
Turnovers	0	4
Time of possession	26:27	33:33

Team	Category	Player	Statistics
Idaho State	Passing	Jordan Cooke	18/33, 152 yards, TD
Idaho State	Rushing	Carson Sudbury	3 carries, 37 yards
Idaho State	Receiving	Julian Mason	7 receptions, 75 yards
Utah State	Passing	McCae Hillstead	15/30, 178 yards, 2 TD, 3 INT
Utah State	Rushing	Javen Jacobs	20 carries, 80 yards
Utah State	Receiving	Eli Wood	6 receptions, 90 yards

=== San Diego ===
San Diego Toreros (0–1) at No. 17 Idaho State Bengals (2–0) – Game summary

Quarter	1	2	3	4	Total
Toreros	0	10	0	7	17
No. 17 Bengals	21	3	14	21	59

at ICCU Dome • Pocatello, Idaho

- Date: September 12
- Game time: 4:00 p.m.
- Game weather: none (played indoors)
- Game attendance: 6,574
- Referee: Justin Robinson
- TV announcers (ESPN+): Scott Gross and Mitch Beckstead

Game information

First quarter

- IDST – Davis Harsin 4-yard run (Mason Lindberg kick), 10:22. Bengals 7–0. Drive: 5 plays, 56 yards, 2:06.
- IDST – Carson Sudbury 8-yard pass from Jordan Cooke (Mason Lindberg kick), 6:32. Bengals 14–0. Drive: 8 plays, 43 yards, 3:08.
- IDST – Chedon James 74-yard pass from Jordan Cooke (Mason Lindberg kick), 4:04. Bengals 21–0. Drive: 1 plays, 74 yards, 0:11.

Second quarter

- USD – Dom Nankil 7-yard run (Emiliano Salazar kick), 10:59. Bengals 21–7. Drive: 9 plays, 61 yards, 4:01.
- USD – Emiliano Salazar 37-yard field goal, 2:57. Bengals 21–10. Drive: 10 plays, 45 yards, 4:09.
- IDST – Mason Lindberg 42-yard field goal, 0:44. Bengals 24–10. Drive: 7 plays, 50 yards, 2:05.

Third quarter

- IDST – Collin Lewis 28-yard interception return (Mason Lindberg kick), 10:13. Bengals 31–10.
- IDST – Tytan Mason 21-yard run (Mason Lindberg kick), 6:56. Bengals 38–10. Drive: 4 plays, 67 yards, 1:47.

Fourth quarter

- IDST – Zedekiah Anahu-Ambrosio 79-yard pass from Jordan Cooke (Mason Lindberg kick), 14:12. Bengals 45–10. Drive: 2 plays, 93 yards, 0:42.
- USD – CJ Ceron 53-yard run (Emiliano Salazar kick), 12:28. Bengals 45–17. Drive: 3 plays, 73 yards, 1:38.
- IDST – Zedekiah Anahu-Ambrosio 90-yard pass from Davis Harsin (Mason Lindberg kick), 5:23. Bengals 52–17. Drive: 1 plays, 90 yards, 0:12.
- IDST – Elijah Beamon 1-yard run (Mason Lindberg kick), 1:07. Bengals 59–17. Drive: 6 plays, 73 yards, 2:36.

Statistics	USD	IDST
First downs	17	22
Plays–yards	71–357	57–640
Rushes–yards	45–235	27–178
Passing yards	122	462
Passing: comp–att–int	11–26–2	19–30–0
Turnovers	2	0
Time of possession	35:21	24:39

Team	Category	Player	Statistics
San Diego	Passing	Dom Nankil	11/22, 122 yards, 2 INT
San Diego	Rushing	Omar Mbakwe	13 carries, 63 yards
San Diego	Receiving	Elijah Taylor	3 receptions, 34 yards
Idaho State	Passing	Jordan Cooke	15/26, 331 yards, 3 TD
Idaho State	Rushing	Tytan Mason	6 carries, 60 yards, TD
Idaho State	Receiving	Zedekiah Anahu-Ambrosio	3 receptions, 195 yards, 2 TD

=== at Southern Utah ===
No. 14 Idaho State Bengals (3–0) at Southern Utah Thunderbirds (1–3) – Game summary

Quarter	1	2	3	4	Total
No. 14 Bengals	0	0	0	0	0
Thunderbirds	0	0	0	0	0

at Eccles Coliseum • Cedar City, Utah

- Date: September 26
- Game time: 6:00 p.m.

Game information

First quarter
Second quarter
Third quarter
Fourth quarter

Statistics	IDST	SUU
First downs		
Plays–yards		
Rushes–yards		
Passing yards		
Passing: comp–att–int		
Turnovers		
Time of possession		

Team	Category	Player	Statistics
Idaho State	Passing		
Idaho State	Rushing		
Idaho State	Receiving		
Southern Utah	Passing		
Southern Utah	Rushing		
Southern Utah	Receiving		

=== No. 19 Northern Arizona ===
No. 19 Northern Arizona Lumberjacks (3–2) at No. 12 Idaho State Bengals (4–0) – Game summary

Quarter	1	2	3	4	Total
No. 19 Lumberjacks	0	0	0	0	0
No. 12 Bengals	0	0	0	0	0

at ICCU Dome • Pocatello, Idaho

- Date: October 3
- Game time: 6:00 p.m.

Game information

First quarter
Second quarter
Third quarter
Fourth quarter

Statistics	NAU	IDST
First downs		
Plays–yards		
Rushes–yards		
Passing yards		
Passing: comp–att–int		
Turnovers		
Time of possession		

Team	Category	Player	Statistics
Northern Arizona	Passing		
Northern Arizona	Rushing		
Northern Arizona	Receiving		
Idaho State	Passing		
Idaho State	Rushing		
Idaho State	Receiving		

=== Cal Poly ===
Cal Poly Mustangs (3–3) at No. 16 Idaho State Bengals (4–1) – Game summary

Quarter	1	2	3	4	Total
Mustangs	0	0	0	0	0
No. 16 Bengals	0	0	0	0	0

at ICCU Dome • Pocatello, Idaho

- Date: October 10
- Game time: 4:00 p.m.

Game information

First quarter
Second quarter
Third quarter
Fourth quarter

Statistics	CP	IDST
First downs		
Plays–yards		
Rushes–yards		
Passing yards		
Passing: comp–att–int		
Turnovers		
Time of possession		

Team	Category	Player	Statistics
Cal Poly	Passing		
Cal Poly	Rushing		
Cal Poly	Receiving		
Idaho State	Passing		
Idaho State	Rushing		
Idaho State	Receiving		

=== at Weber State ===
No. 21 Idaho State Bengals (4–2) at Weber State Wildcats (4–3) – Game summary

Quarter	1	2	3	4	Total
No. 21 Bengals	7	7	6	0	20
Wildcats	6	0	13	8	27

at Stewart Stadium • Ogden, Utah

- Date: October 17
- Game time: 1:00 p.m.
- Game weather: Sunny • Temperature: 62 °F (17 °C) • Wind: SE at 9 miles per hour (14 km/h)
- Game attendance: 8,428
- Referee: Justin Robinson
- TV announcers (KJZZ): Dave Fox, Alema Harrington, and Frank Dolce

Game information

First quarter

- IDST – 4:52 Trehsyn Fesili 50-yard interception return (Mason Lindberg kick). IDST 7–0. D
- WEB – 0:16 Robert Young 68-yard part return (run failed). IDST 7–6.

Second quarter

- IDST – 3:37 Julian Mason 32-yard pass from Davis Harsin (Mason Lindberg kick). IDST 14–6. Drive: 9 plays, 82 yards, 3:47.

Third quarter

- WEB – 10:37 Seth Rigtrup 2-yard run (run failed). IDST 14–12. Drive: 9 plays, 91 yards, 4:19.
- WEB – 4:54 Noah Kjar 14-yard pass from Nate Dahle (David Dellenbach kick). WEB 19–14. Drive: 9 plays, 69 yards, 4:40.
- IDST – 1:56 Parker Graham 18-yard pass from Jordan Cooke (run failed). IDST 20–19. Drive: 6 plays, 75 yards, 2:58.

Fourth quarter

- WEB – 1:10 Spencer Ferguson 2-yard run (Tate Kjar pass from Nate Dahle). WEB 27–20. Drive: 4 plays, 55 yards, 0:35.

Statistics	IDST	WEB
First downs	19	18
Plays–yards	74–318	71–358
Rushes–yards	37–120	38–185
Passing yards	198	173
Passing: comp–att–int	19–37–1	18–33–1
Turnovers	1	2
Time of possession	30:38	29:22

Team	Category	Player	Statistics
Idaho State	Passing	Davis Harsin	14/27, 145 yards, TD
Idaho State	Rushing	Davis Harsin	20 carries, 93 yards
Idaho State	Receiving	Julian Mason	5 receptions, 82 yards, TD
Weber State	Passing	Nate Dahle	18/33, 173 yards, TD, INT
Weber State	Rushing	Spencer Ferguson	16 carries, 134 yards, TD
Weber State	Receiving	Niah Kjar	4 receptions, 40 yards, TD

=== Portland State ===
Portland State Vikings (2–5) at Idaho State Bengals (4–3) – Game summary

Quarter	1	2	3	4	Total
Vikings	0	0	0	0	0
Bengals	0	0	0	0	0

at ICCU Dome • Pocatello, Idaho

- Date: October 24
- Game time: 4:00 p.m.

Game information

First quarter
Second quarter
Third quarter
Fourth quarter

Statistics	PRST	IDST
First downs		
Plays–yards		
Rushes–yards		
Passing yards		
Passing: comp–att–int		
Turnovers		
Time of possession		

Team	Category	Player	Statistics
Portland State	Passing		
Portland State	Rushing		
Portland State	Receiving		
Idaho State	Passing		
Idaho State	Rushing		
Idaho State	Receiving		

=== at Utah Tech ===
No. 23 Idaho State Bengals (5–3) at Utah Tech Trailblazers (1–7) – Game summary

Quarter	1	2	3	4	Total
No. 23 Bengals	0	0	0	0	0
Trailblazers	0	0	0	0	0

at Greater Zion Stadium • St. George, Utah

- Date: October 31
- Game time: 1:00 p.m.

Game information

First quarter
Second quarter
Third quarter
Fourth quarter

Statistics	IDST	UTU
First downs		
Plays–yards		
Rushes–yards		
Passing yards		
Passing: comp–att–int		
Turnovers		
Time of possession		

Team	Category	Player	Statistics
Idaho State	Passing		
Idaho State	Rushing		
Idaho State	Receiving		
Utah Tech	Passing		
Utah Tech	Rushing		
Utah Tech	Receiving		

=== No. 3 Montana State ===
No. 3 Montana State Bobcats (8–1) at No. 22 Idaho State Bengals (6–3) – Game summary

Quarter	1	2	3	4	Total
No. 3 Bobcats	0	0	0	0	0
No. 22 Bengals	0	0	0	0	0

at ICCU Dome • Pocatello, Idaho

- Date: November 7
- Game time: 4:00 p.m.

Game information

First quarter
Second quarter
Third quarter
Fourth quarter

Statistics	MTST	IDST
First downs		
Plays–yards		
Rushes–yards		
Passing yards		
Passing: comp–att–int		
Turnovers		
Time of possession		

Team	Category	Player	Statistics
Montana State	Passing		
Montana State	Rushing		
Montana State	Receiving		
Idaho State	Passing		
Idaho State	Rushing		
Idaho State	Receiving		

=== at No. 12 Montana ===
No. 21 Idaho State Bengals (6–4) at No. 12 Montana Grizzlies (7–3) – Game summary

Quarter	1	2	3	4	Total
No. 21 Bengals	0	0	0	0	0
No. 12 Grizzlies	0	0	0	0	0

at Washington–Grizzly Stadium • Missoula, Montana

- Date: November 14
- Game time: 8:30 p.m.

Game information

First quarter
Second quarter
Third quarter
Fourth quarter

Statistics	IDST	MONT
First downs		
Plays–yards		
Rushes–yards		
Passing yards		
Passing: comp–att–int		
Turnovers		
Time of possession		

Team	Category	Player	Statistics
Idaho State	Passing		
Idaho State	Rushing		
Idaho State	Receiving		
Montana	Passing		
Montana	Rushing		
Montana	Receiving		

=== Idaho (rivalry) ===
Idaho Vandals (5–6) at No. 25 Idaho State Bengals (6–5) – Game summary

Quarter	1	2	3	4	Total
Vandals	0	0	0	0	0
No. 25 Bengals	0	0	0	0	0

at ICCU Dome • Pocatello, Idaho

- Date: November 21
- Game time: 4:00 p.m.

Game information

First quarter
Second quarter
Third quarter
Fourth quarter

Statistics	IDHO	IDST
First downs		
Plays–yards		
Rushes–yards		
Passing yards		
Passing: comp–att–int		
Turnovers		
Time of possession		

Team	Category	Player	Statistics
Idaho	Passing		
Idaho	Rushing		
Idaho	Receiving		
Idaho State	Passing		
Idaho State	Rushing		
Idaho State	Receiving		
