= 2026 Utah Tech Trailblazers football team =

American college football season

2026 Utah Tech Trailblazers football
- Conference: Big Sky Conference
- Record: 1–11 (1–8 Big Sky)
- Head coach: Lance Anderson (3rd season)
- Offensive coordinator: Greg Stevens (3rd season)
- Defensive coordinator: Ray Clark (1st season)
- Home stadium: Greater Zion Stadium

2026 Big Sky Conference football standings
	Conf.			Overall
Team	W		L	W		L
No. 2 Montana State $^	8	–	1	11	–	1
No. 15 Weber State	7	–	2	8	–	4
No. 12 Northern Arizona	7	–	2	9	–	3
No. 8 Montana	6	–	3	8	–	4
No. 23 UC Davis	6	–	3	8	–	4
Idaho	5	–	4	5	–	7
Southern Utah	4	–	4	6	–	6
No. 25 Idaho State	4	–	5	7	–	5
Cal Poly	3	–	6	4	–	8
Portland State	3	–	6	3	–	9
Eastern Washington	2	–	7	3	–	9
Northern Colorado	2	–	7	3	–	9
Utah Tech	1	–	8	1	–	11
$ – Conference champion; ^ – FCS playoff participant; As of November 22, 2026; Rankings from STATS Poll

The 2026 Utah Tech Trailblazers football team will represent Utah Tech University as a member of the Big Sky Conference during the 2026 NCAA Division I FCS football season. The Trailblazers will be led by third-year head coach Lance Anderson and will play their home games at Greater Zion Stadium in St. George, Utah. This season is the program's first season in the Big Sky Conference.

== Schedule ==
Date	Time	Opponent	Site	TV	Result	Attendance
August 29	8:00 p.m.	No. 1 Montana State	Greater Zion Stadium; St. George, UT	ESPN+	L 0–54	6,412
September 5	6:00 p.m.	at No. 14т (FBS) BYU*	LaVell Edwards Stadium; Provo, UT	ESPN+	L 7–63	64,077
September 12	1:00 p.m.	at No. 3 Montana (Note: The games against Montana and Northern Arizona, fellow members of the Big Sky Conference, will both be non-conference games and not count in the league standings.)*	Washington–Grizzly Stadium; Missoula, MT	KUPX	L 14–35	25,418
September 19	6:00 p.m.	No. 20 Northern Arizona*	Greater Zion Stadium; St. George, UT	ESPN+	L 23–35	3,447
September 26	6:00 p.m.	at Northern Colorado	Nottingham Field; Greeley, CO	ESPN+	L 13–37	5,287
October 3	6:00 p.m.	Southern Utah	Greater Zion Stadium; St. George, UT	ESPN+	L 33–46	6,038
October 10	2:00 p.m.	at Portland State	Hillsboro Stadium; Hillsboro, OR	ESPN+	L 14–30	1,964
October 24	3:00 p.m.	at Cal Poly	Mustang Memorial Field; San Luis Obispo, CA	ESPN+	W 43–26	6,478
October 31	1:00 p.m.	No. 23 Idaho State	Greater Zion Stadium; St. George, UT	ESPN+	L 27–34	2,991
November 7	5:00 p.m.	at UC Davis	UC Davis Health Stadium; Davis, CA	ESPN+	L 17–24	10,011
November 14	7:00 p.m.	Eastern Washington	Greater Zion Stadium; St. George, UT	ESPN+	L 28–31	4,447
November 21	1:00 p.m.	at No. 15 Weber State	Stewart Stadium; Ogden, UT	KJZZ/KMYU	L 24-31	6,754
*Non-conference game; Rankings from STATS Poll released prior to the game; All times are in Mountain time

== Game summaries ==
=== No. 1 Montana State ===
No. 1 Montana State Bobcats (0–0) at Utah Tech Trailblazers (0–0) – Game summary

Quarter	1	2	3	4	Total
No. 1 Bobcats	10	16	14	14	54
Trailblazers	0	0	0	0	0

at Greater Zion Stadium • St. George, Utah

- Date: August 29
- Game time: 8:00 p.m.
- Game weather: Sunny • Temperature: 97 °F (36 °C) • Wind: SW at 17 miles per hour (27 km/h)
- Game attendance: 6,412
- Referee: Gregg Wilson
- TV announcers (ESPN+): Ben Creighton, Ty Gregorak and Grace Lawrence

Game information

First quarter

- MTST – Dane Steel 55-yard pass from Justin Lamson (Myles Sansted kick), 5:39. Bobcats 7–0. Drive: 4 plays, 82 yards, 1:58.
- MTST – Myles Sansted 47-yard field goal, 0:00. Bobcats 10–0. Drive: 7 plays, 17 yards, 3:28.

Second quarter

- MTST – Xavier Ahrens 16-yard blocked punt return (Myles Sansted kick), 14:04. Bobcats 17–0.
- MTST – Adam Jones 2-yard run (Myles Sansted kick BLOCKED), 4:18. Bobcats 23–0. Drive: 10 plays, 58 yards, 5:27.
- MTST – Myles Sansted 33-yard field goal, 0:33. Bobcats 26–0. Drive: 12 plays, 43 yards, 2:40.

Third quarter

- MTST – Rylan Schlepp 3-yard pass from Justin Lamson (Myles Sansted kick), 10:51. Bobcats 33–0. Drive: 8 plays, 75 yards, 4:02.
- MTST – Justin Lamson 6-yard run (Myles Sansted kick), 5:06. Bobcats 40–0. Drive: 9 plays, 48 yards, 4:27.

Fourth quarter

- MTST – Carter Dahlke 25-yard pass from Patrick Duchien (Myles Sansted kick), 12:44. Bobcats 47–0. Drive: 9 plays, 59 yards, 5:10.
- MTST – Brendon Ross 28-yard interception return (Myles Sansted kick), 11:50. Bobcats 54–0.

Statistics	MTST	UTU
First downs	24	12
Plays–yards	71–447	59–227
Rushes–yards	35–140	26–58
Passing yards	307	169
Passing: comp–att–int	27–36–0	19–33–2
Turnovers	0	2
Time of possession	35:20	24:40

Team	Category	Player	Statistics
Montana State	Passing	Justin Lamson	22/30, 260 yards, 2 TD
Montana State	Rushing	Adam Jones	11 carries, 35 yards, TD
Montana State	Receiving	Dane Steel	8 receptions, 174 yards, TD
Utah Tech	Passing	CJ Tiller	10/12, 91 yards
Utah Tech	Rushing	Bronson Barben	6 carries, 21 yards
Utah Tech	Receiving	Mike Williams	4 receptions, 42 yards

=== at No. 14т (FBS) BYU ===
Utah Tech Trailblazers (0–1) at No. 14т (FBS) BYU Cougars (0–0) – Game summary

Quarter	1	2	3	4	Total
Trailblazers	0	0	7	0	7
No. 14т (FBS) Cougars	14	28	14	7	63

at LaVell Edwards Stadium • Provo, Utah

- Date: September 5, 2026
- Game time: 6:00 p.m. MDT
- Game weather: Sunny, clear • Temperature: 86 °F (30 °C) • Wind: SW 8 mph (13 km/h)
- Game attendance: 64,077
- Referee: Michael McCabe
- TV announcers (ESPN+): Pete Sousa, Leger Douzable, and Austyn Iven

Game information

First quarter

- BYU – 13:05 Legend Glasker 9-yard run (Matthias Dunn kick). BYU 7–0. Drive: 5 plays, 32 yards, 1:39.
- BYU – 3:53 Jojo Phillips 29-yard pass from Bear Bachmeier (Matthias Dunn kick). BYU 14–0. Drive: 13 plays, 82 yards, 7:29.

Second quarter

- BYU – 14:53 Legend Glasker 26-yard pass from Bear Bachmeier (Matthias Dunn kick). BYU 21–0. Drive: 2 plays, 30 yards, 0:38.
- BYU – 11:22 Preston Rex 9-yard run (Matthias Dunn kick). BYU 28–0. Drive: 5 plays, 65 yards, 2:19.
- BYU – 7:47 Legend Glasker 33-yard pass from Bear Bachmeier (Matthias Dunn kick). BYU 35–0. Drive: 5 plays, 66 yards, 2:36.
- BYU – 0:34 Bear Bachmeier 13-yard run (Matthias Dunn kick). BYU 42–0. Drive: 8 plays, 66 yards, 2:11.

Third quarter

- BYU – 14:42 Cannon DeVries 100-yard kickoff return (Brody Laga kick). BYU 49–0. 0:18.
- BYU – 12:30 Journee Tonga 4-yard run (Brody Laga kick). BYU 56–0. Drive: 3 plays, 55 yards, 1:13.
- UTU – 4:45 Ace Chatman 1-yard run (Dax Iverson kick). BYU 56–7. Drive: 15 plays, 75 yards, 7:45.

Fourth quarter

- BYU – 14:07 Devaughn Eka 11-yard run (Brody Laga kick). BYU 63–7. Drive: 11 plays, 69 yards, 5:33.

Statistics	UTU	BYU
First downs	11	29
Plays–yards	56–184	68–521
Rushes–yards	25–49	48–308
Passing yards	135	213
Passing: comp–att–int	15–31–3	17–22–0
Turnovers	4	0
Time of possession	26:45	33:15

Team	Category	Player	Statistics
Utah Tech	Passing	Bronsen Barben	12/22, 115 yards, INT
Utah Tech	Rushing	Ace Chatman	12 carries, 38 yards, TD
Utah Tech	Receiving	Darnell O'Quinn	3 receptions, 41 yards
BYU	Passing	Bear Bachmeier	16/20, 198 yards, 3 TD
BYU	Rushing	Devaughn Eka	8 carries, 59 yards, TD
BYU	Receiving	Legend Glasker	3 receptions, 65 yards, 2 TD

=== at No. 3 Montana ===
Utah Tech Trailblazers (0–2) at No. 3 Montana Grizzlies (2–0) – Game summary

Quarter	1	2	3	4	Total
Trailblazers	0	0	0	14	14
No. 3 Grizzlies	7	14	0	14	35

at Washington–Grizzly Stadium • Missoula, Montana

- Date: September 12
- Game time: 1:00 p.m.
- Game weather: Sunny • Temperature: 65 °F (18 °C) • Wind: NE at 10 miles per hour (16 km/h)
- Game attendance: 25,418
- Referee: Spencer Mumford
- TV announcers (ESPN+): Trey Bender (play-by-play), Jordan Tripp (analyst) and Kyle Hansen (sideline)

Game information

First quarter

- (10:01) MONT – Eli Gillman 1-yard run, Jo Silver kick (Drive: 5 plays, 61 yards, 2:16; Montana 7–0)

Second quarter

- (14:57) MONT – Eli Gillman 1-yard run, Jo Silver kick (Drive: 9 plays, 32 yards, 4:27; Montana 14–0)
- (0:52) MONT – Lekeldrick Bridges 15-yard pass from Keali'i Ah Yat, Jo Silver kick (Drive: 5 plays, 72 yards, 0:57; Montana 21–0)

Third quarter

No scoring plays

Fourth quarter

- (8:37) MONT – Eli Gillman 75-yard run, Jo Silver kick (Drive: 1 play, 66 yards, 0:33; Montana 28–0)
- (6:38) UTU – Bronson Barben 1-yard run, Dax Iverson kick (Drive: 6 plays, 75 yards, 1:59; Montana 28–7)
- (6:20) MONT – Dylan Paine 57-yard run, Jo Silver kick (Drive: 1 play, 57 yards, 0:11; Montana 35–7)
- (3:23) UTU – Mike Williams 60-yard pass from Bronson Barben, Dax Iverson kick (Drive: 2 plays, 75 yards, 0:35; Montana 35–14)

Statistics	UTU	MONT
First downs	20	20
Plays–yards	68–405	66–462
Rushes–yards	33–104	29–216
Passing yards	301	246
Passing: comp–att–int	21–35–0	25–37–0
Turnovers	2	0
Time of possession	32:21	27:39

Team	Category	Player	Statistics
Utah Tech	Passing	Bronson Barben	21/35, 301 yards, TD
Utah Tech	Rushing	Ace Chatman	21 carries, 95 yards
Utah Tech	Receiving	Mike Williams	3 receptions, 80 yards, TD
Montana	Passing	Keali'i Ah Yat	25/35, 246 yards, TD
Montana	Rushing	Eli Gillman	17 carries, 147 yards, 3 TD
Montana	Receiving	Brooks Davis	12 receptions, 151 yards

=== No. 20 Northern Arizona ===
No. 20 Northern Arizona Lumberjacks (2–1) at Utah Tech Trailblazers (0–3) – Game summary

Quarter	1	2	3	4	Total
No. 20 Lumberjacks	0	0	0	0	0
Trailblazers	0	0	0	0	0

at Greater Zion Stadium • St. George, Utah

- Date: September 19
- Game time: 6:00 p.m.
- TV: ESPN+

Game information

First quarter
Second quarter
Third quarter
Fourth quarter

Statistics	NAU	UTU
First downs		
Plays–yards		
Rushes–yards		
Passing yards		
Passing: comp–att–int		
Turnovers		
Time of possession		

Team	Category	Player	Statistics
Northern Arizona	Passing		
Northern Arizona	Rushing		
Northern Arizona	Receiving		
Utah Tech	Passing		
Utah Tech	Rushing		
Utah Tech	Receiving		

=== at Northern Colorado ===
Utah Tech Trailblazers (0–4) at Northern Colorado Bears (1–3) – Game summary

Quarter	1	2	3	4	Total
Trailblazers	0	0	0	0	0
Bears	0	0	0	0	0

at Nottingham Field • Greeley, Colorado

- Date: September 26
- Game time: 6:00 p.m.
- TV: ESPN+

Game information

First quarter
Second quarter
Third quarter
Fourth quarter

Statistics	UTU	UNCO
First downs		
Plays–yards		
Rushes–yards		
Passing yards		
Passing: comp–att–int		
Turnovers		
Time of possession		

Team	Category	Player	Statistics
Utah Tech	Passing		
Utah Tech	Rushing		
Utah Tech	Receiving		
Northern Colorado	Passing		
Northern Colorado	Rushing		
Northern Colorado	Receiving		

=== Southern Utah ===
Southern Utah Thunderbirds (1–4) at Utah Tech Trailblazers (0–5) – Game summary

Quarter	1	2	3	4	Total
Thunderbirds	0	0	0	0	0
Trailblazers	0	0	0	0	0

at Greater Zion Stadium • St. George, Utah

- Date: October 3
- Game time: 6:00 p.m.

Game information

First quarter
Second quarter
Third quarter
Fourth quarter

Statistics	SUU	UTU
First downs		
Plays–yards		
Rushes–yards		
Passing yards		
Passing: comp–att–int		
Turnovers		
Time of possession		

Team	Category	Player	Statistics
Southern Utah	Passing		
Southern Utah	Rushing		
Southern Utah	Receiving		
Utah Tech	Passing		
Utah Tech	Rushing		
Utah Tech	Receiving		

=== at Portland State ===
Utah Tech Trailblazers (0–6) at Portland State Vikings (1–4) – Game summary

Quarter	1	2	3	4	Total
Trailblazers	0	0	0	0	0
Vikings	0	0	0	0	0

at Hillsboro Stadium • Hillsboro, Oregon

- Date: October 10
- Game time: 2:00 p.m.

Game information

First quarter
Second quarter
Third quarter
Fourth quarter

Statistics	UTU	PRST
First downs		
Plays–yards		
Rushes–yards		
Passing yards		
Passing: comp–att–int		
Turnovers		
Time of possession		

Team	Category	Player	Statistics
Utah Tech	Passing		
Utah Tech	Rushing		
Utah Tech	Receiving		
Portland State	Passing		
Portland State	Rushing		
Portland State	Receiving		

=== at Cal Poly ===
Utah Tech Trailblazers (0–7) at Cal Poly Mustangs (4–4) – Game summary

Quarter	1	2	3	4	Total
Trailblazers	0	0	0	0	0
Mustangs	0	0	0	0	0

at Mustang Memorial Field • San Luis Obispo, California

- Date: October 24
- Game time: 3:00 p.m.

Game information

First quarter
Second quarter
Third quarter
Fourth quarter

Statistics	UTU	CP
First downs		
Plays–yards		
Rushes–yards		
Passing yards		
Passing: comp–att–int		
Turnovers		
Time of possession		

Team	Category	Player	Statistics
Utah Tech	Passing		
Utah Tech	Rushing		
Utah Tech	Receiving		
Cal Poly	Passing		
Cal Poly	Rushing		
Cal Poly	Receiving		

=== No. 23 Idaho State ===
No. 23 Idaho State Bengals (5–3) at Utah Tech Trailblazers (1–7) – Game summary

Quarter	1	2	3	4	Total
No. 23 Bengals	0	0	0	0	0
Trailblazers	0	0	0	0	0

at Greater Zion Stadium • St. George, Utah

- Date: October 31
- Game time: 1:00 p.m.

Game information

First quarter
Second quarter
Third quarter
Fourth quarter

Statistics	IDST	UTU
First downs		
Plays–yards		
Rushes–yards		
Passing yards		
Passing: comp–att–int		
Turnovers		
Time of possession		

Team	Category	Player	Statistics
Idaho State	Passing		
Idaho State	Rushing		
Idaho State	Receiving		
Utah Tech	Passing		
Utah Tech	Rushing		
Utah Tech	Receiving		

=== at UC Davis ===
Utah Tech Trailblazers (1–8) at UC Davis Aggies (5–4) – Game summary

Quarter	1	2	3	4	Total
Trailblazers	0	0	0	0	0
Aggies	0	0	0	0	0

at UC Davis Health Stadium • Davis, California

- Date: November 7
- Game time: 5:00 p.m.

Game information

First quarter
Second quarter
Third quarter
Fourth quarter

Statistics	UTU	UCD
First downs		
Plays–yards		
Rushes–yards		
Passing yards		
Passing: comp–att–int		
Turnovers		
Time of possession		

Team	Category	Player	Statistics
Utah Tech	Passing		
Utah Tech	Rushing		
Utah Tech	Receiving		
UC Davis	Passing		
UC Davis	Rushing		
UC Davis	Receiving		

=== Eastern Washington ===
Eastern Washington Eagles (2–8) at Utah Tech Trailblazers (1–9) – Game summary

Quarter	1	2	3	4	Total
Eagles	0	0	0	0	0
Trailblazers	0	0	0	0	0

at Greater Zion Stadium • St. George, Utah

- Date: November 14
- Game time: 2:00 p.m.

Game information

First quarter
Second quarter
Third quarter
Fourth quarter

Statistics	EWU	UTU
First downs		
Plays–yards		
Rushes–yards		
Passing yards		
Passing: comp–att–int		
Turnovers		
Time of possession		

Team	Category	Player	Statistics
Eastern Washington	Passing		
Eastern Washington	Rushing		
Eastern Washington	Receiving		
Utah Tech	Passing		
Utah Tech	Rushing		
Utah Tech	Receiving		

=== at No. 15 Weber State ===
Utah Tech Trailblazers (1–10) at No. 15 Weber State Wildcats (7–4) – Game summary

Quarter	1	2	3	4	Total
Trailblazers	0	0	0	0	0
No. 15 Wildcats	0	0	0	0	0

at Stewart Stadium • Ogden, Utah

- Date: November 21
- Game time: 1:00 p.m.

Game information

First quarter
Second quarter
Third quarter
Fourth quarter

Statistics	UTU	WEB
First downs		
Plays–yards		
Rushes–yards		
Passing yards		
Passing: comp–att–int		
Turnovers		
Time of possession		

Team	Category	Player	Statistics
Utah Tech	Passing		
Utah Tech	Rushing		
Utah Tech	Receiving		
Weber State	Passing		
Weber State	Rushing		
Weber State	Receiving		
