= 2026 Northern Colorado Bears football team =

American college football season

2026 Northern Colorado Bears football
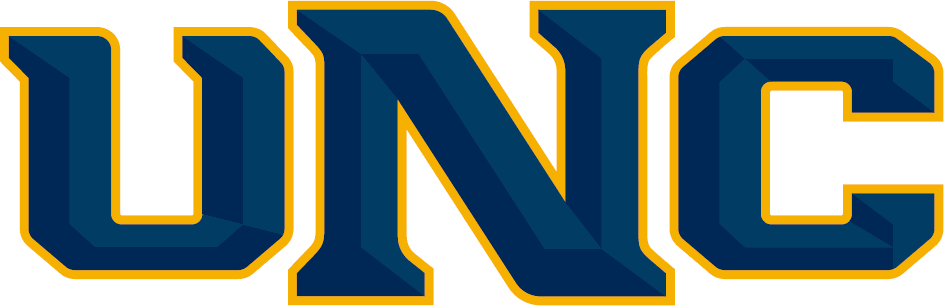
- Conference: Big Sky Conference
- Record: 3–9 (2–7 Big Sky)
- Head coach: Ed Lamb (4th season)
- Offensive coordinator: Justin Walterscheid (3rd season)
- Defensive coordinator: Preston Hadley (4th season)
- Home stadium: Nottingham Field

2026 Big Sky Conference football standings
	Conf.			Overall
Team	W		L	W		L
No. 2 Montana State $^	8	–	1	11	–	1
No. 15 Weber State	7	–	2	8	–	4
No. 12 Northern Arizona	7	–	2	9	–	3
No. 8 Montana	6	–	3	8	–	4
No. 23 UC Davis	6	–	3	8	–	4
Idaho	5	–	4	5	–	7
Southern Utah	4	–	4	6	–	6
No. 25 Idaho State	4	–	5	7	–	5
Cal Poly	3	–	6	4	–	8
Portland State	3	–	6	3	–	9
Eastern Washington	2	–	7	3	–	9
Northern Colorado	2	–	7	3	–	9
Utah Tech	1	–	8	1	–	11
$ – Conference champion; ^ – FCS playoff participant; As of November 22, 2026; Rankings from STATS Poll

The 2026 Northern Colorado Bears football team will represent the University of Northern Colorado as a member of the Big Sky Conference during the 2026 NCAA Division I FCS football season. The Bears will be led by fourth-year head coach Ed Lamb and will play their home games at Nottingham Field in Greeley, Colorado.

== Schedule ==
Date	Time	Opponent	Site	TV	Result	Attendance
August 28	7:00 p.m.	Weber State	Nottingham Field; Greeley, CO	ESPN+	L 29–30	5,715
September 5	6:00 p.m.	No. 11 South Dakota*	Nottingham Field; Greeley, CO	ESPN+	L 23–38	4,259
September 12	2:00 p.m.	at Wyoming*	War Memorial Stadium; Laramie, WY	MW+	L 13–21	24,105
September 19	6:00 p.m.	Northeastern State*	Nottingham Field; Greeley, CO	ESPN+	W 23–17 ^{OT}	3,500
September 26	6:00 p.m.	Utah Tech^{†}	Nottingham Field; Greeley, CO	ESPN+	W 37–13	5,287
October 3	2:00 p.m.	at No. 3 Montana	Washington–Grizzly Stadium; Missoula, MT	ESPN+	L 14–36	27,131
October 10	5:00 p.m.	at Eastern Washington	Roos Field; Cheney, WA	ESPN+	L 22–31	4,990
October 17	6:00 p.m.	Cal Poly	Nottingham Field; Greeley, CO	ESPN+	W 28–18	4,580
October 24	5:00 p.m.	at No. 20 UC Davis	UC Davis Health Stadium; Davis, CA	ESPN+	L 6–33	7,841
November 7	1:00 p.m.	at Southern Utah	Eccles Coliseum; Cedar City, UT	ESPN+	L 24–31	2,562
November 14	5:00 p.m.	No. 2 Montana State	Nottingham Field; Greeley, CO	ESPN+	L 21–31	5,319
November 21	2:00 p.m.	at No. 12 Northern Arizona	Walkup Skydome; Flagstaff, AZ	ESPN+	L 26–35	6,879
*Non-conference game; ^{†}Homecoming; Rankings from STATS Poll released prior to the game; All times are in Mountain time

== Game summaries ==
=== Weber State ===
Weber State Wildcats (0–0) at Northern Colorado Bears (0–0) – Game summary

Quarter	1	2	3	4	Total
Wildcats	3	14	6	7	30
Bears	7	6	0	16	29

at Nottingham Field • Greeley, Colorado

- Date: August 28
- Game time: 7:00 p.m.
- Game weather: Sunny
- Game attendance: 5,715
- Referee: Spencer Mumford
- TV announcers (ESPN+): Christian Saez and Matt Gaiter

Game information

First quarter

- WEB – David Dellenbach 44-yard field goal, 13:45. Wildcats 3–0. Drive: 9 plays, 59 yards, 1:10.
- UNCO – Mathias Price 31-yard run (Landon Richardson kick), 0:00. Bears 7–3. Drive: 8 plays, 65 yards, 5:08.

Second quarter

- WEB – Noah Kjar 15-yard pass from Devin Brown (David Dellenbach kick), 12:33. Wildcats 10–7. Drive: 8 plays, 75 yards, 2:27.
- UNCO – Kenny Lueth 2-yard run (Landon Richardson kick BLOCKED), 1:33. Bears 13–10. Drive: 5 plays, 42 yards, 1:58.
- WEB – Noah Kjar 34-yard pass from Devin Brown (David Dellenbach kick), 1:00. Wildcats 17–13. Drive: 4 plays, 75 yards, 0:33.

Third quarter

- WEB – David Dellenbach 42-yard field goal, 8:15. Wildcats 20–13. Drive: 8 plays, 47 yards, 3:22.
- WEB – David Dellenbach 39-yard field goal, 2:56. Wildcats 23–13. Drive: 8 plays, 33 yards, 3:52.

Fourth quarter

- UNCO – Kenny Lueth 2-yard run (Benson Ashley kick), 13:28. Wildcats 23–20. Drive: 9 plays, 65 yards, 4:28.
- WEB – Mapa Vaenuku 1-yard run (David Dellenbach kick), 9:04. Wildcats 30–20. Drive: 9 plays, 70 yards, 4:17.
- UNCO – Benson Ashley 23-yard field goal, 4:02. Wildcats 30–23. Drive: 10 plays, 70 yards, 5:02.
- UNCO – Trey Olsen 12-yard pass from Kenny Lueth (Benson Ashley kick BLOCKED), 0:03. Wildcats 30–29. Drive: 15 plays, 80 yards, 2:25.

Statistics	WEB	UNCO
First downs	20	29
Plays–yards	57–370	79–485
Rushes–yards	29–137	46–259
Passing yards	233	226
Passing: comp–att–int	16–28–1	20–33–0
Turnovers	1	0
Time of possession	21:57	38:03

Team	Category	Player	Statistics
Weber State	Passing	Devin Brown	10/20, 179 yards, 2 TD, INT
Weber State	Rushing	Spencer Ferguson	12 carries, 74 yards
Weber State	Receiving	Noah Kjar	6 receptions, 114 yards, 2 TD
Northern Colorado	Passing	Kenny Lueth	20/33, 226 yards, TD
Northern Colorado	Rushing	Mathias Price	17 carries, 106 yards, TD
Northern Colorado	Receiving	Marcus Mozer	6 receptions, 70 yards

=== No. 11 South Dakota ===
No. 11 South Dakota Coyotes (1–0) at Northern Colorado Bears (0–1) – Game summary

Quarter	1	2	3	4	Total
No. 11 Coyotes	7	14	7	10	38
Bears	7	3	7	6	23

at Nottingham Field, Greeley, CO

- Date: September 5, 2026
- Game time: 7:00 p.m.
- Game weather: Sunny
- Game attendance: 4,259
- Referee: Gregg Wilson
- TV announcers (ESPN+): Christian Saex and Matthew Gaitor

Game information

First quarter

- UNCO – Trey Olsen 54-yard pass from Kenny Lueth (Landon Richardson kick), 3:46. Bears 7–0. Drive: 8 plays, 85 yards, 4:59.
- SDAK – Tennel Bryant 46-yard run (Bohdie Ing kick), 2:42. Tied 7–7. Drive: 3 plays, 75 yards, 1:04.

Second quarter

- SDAK – Charles Pierce Jr. 11-yard run (Bohdie Ing kick), 14:01. Coyotes 14–7. Drive: 6 plays, 80 yards, 2:31.
- SDAK – Brayden White 10-yard pass from Austyn Modrzewski (Bohdie Ing kick), 0:40. Coyotes 21–7. Drive: 11 plays, 90 yards, 2:11.
- UNCO – Landon Richardson 39-yard field goal, 0:00. Coyotes 21–10. Drive: 7 plays, 54 yards, 0:40.

Third quarter

- UNCO – Justin Guin 7-yard run (Landon Richardson kick), 7:54. Coyotes 21–17. Drive: 12 plays, 75 yards, 7:06.
- SDAK – Charles Pierce Jr. 11-yard run (Bohdie Ing kick), 2:13. Coyotes 28–17. Drive: 10 plays, 73 yards, 5:34.

Fourth quarter

- SDAK – Bryce Cohoon 22-yard pass from Austyn Modrzewski (Bohdie Ing kick), 14:14. Coyotes 35–17. Drive: 3 plays, 33 yards, 1:21.
- SDAK – Bohdie Ing 25-yard field goal, 4:19. Coyotes 38–17. Drive: 7 plays, 31 yards, 2:56.
- UNCO – Jordan Herron 22-yard pass from Brayten Silbor (pass failed), 2:01. Coyotes 38–23. Drive: 10 plays, 75 yards, 2:18.

Statistics	SDAK	UNCO
First downs	22	22
Plays–yards	56–392	72–377
Rushes–yards	34–214	34–111
Passing yards	392	377
Passing: comp–att–int	14–22–0	24–38–0
Turnovers	0	0
Time of possession	24:16	35:44

Team	Category	Player	Statistics
South Dakota	Passing	Austyn Modrzewski	14/22, 178 yards, 2 TD
South Dakota	Rushing	Keyondray Jones-Logan	10 carries, 55 yards
South Dakota	Receiving	Brayden White	4 receptions, 48 yards, TD
Northern Colorado	Passing	Kenny Leuth	19/29, 201 yards, TD
Northern Colorado	Rushing	Mathias Price	10 carries, 34 yards
Northern Colorado	Receiving	Trey Olsen	3 receptions, 61 yards, TD

=== at Wyoming (FBS) ===
Northern Colorado Bears (0–2) at Wyoming Cowboys (FBS) (0–1) – Game summary

Quarter	1	2	3	4	Total
Bears	0	10	3	0	13
Cowboys (FBS)	0	7	0	14	21

at War Memorial Stadium • Laramie, Wyoming

- Date: September 12
- Game time: 2:00 p.m.
- Game weather: Cloudy • Temperature: 76 °F (24 °C) • Wind: W at 15 miles per hour (24 km/h)
- Game attendance: 24,105
- Referee: Cal McNeill
- TV announcers (MW+): Justin Adams, Jared Petrino and Logan Wilson

Game information

First quarter

No scoring plays.

Second quarter

- WYO – Samuel Harris 4-yard run (Erik Sandvik kick), 7:19. Cowboys 7–0. Drive: 8 plays, 37 yards, 4:44.
- UNCO – Landon Richardson 45-yard field goal, 2:00. Cowboys 7–3. Drive: 9 plays, 49 yards, 5:19.
- UNCO – Marcus Mozer 45-yard pass from Kenny Lueth (Landon Richardson kick), 0:25. Bears 10–7. Drive: 5 plays, 91 yards, 0:58.

Third quarter

- UNCO – Landon Richardson 35-yard field goal, 7:59. Bears 13–7. Drive: 13 plays, 58 yards, 7:01.

Fourth quarter

- WYO – Charlie Coenen 15-yard pass from Tyler Hughes (Erik Sandvik kick), 3:44. Cowboys 14–13. Drive: 14 plays, 82 yards, 7:06.
- WYO – Kyle Frendt 18-yard pass from Tyler Hughes (Erik Sandvik kick), 1:44. Cowboys 21–13. Drive: 5 plays, 38 yards, 0:54.

Statistics	UNCO	WYO
First downs	17	16
Plays–yards	62–345	60–304
Rushes–yards	36–139	34–155
Passing yards	206	149
Passing: comp–att–int	14–26–2	18–26–0
Turnovers	2	2
Time of possession	31:07	28:53

Team	Category	Player	Statistics
Northern Colorado	Passing	Kenny Lueth	13/23, 202 yards, TD, 2 INT
Northern Colorado	Rushing	Justin Guin	17 carries, 88 yards
Northern Colorado	Receiving	Marcus Mozer	3 receptions, 72 yards, TD
Wyoming	Passing	Tyler Hughes	18/26, 149 yards, 2 TD
Wyoming	Rushing	Markell Holman	11 carries, 80 yards
Wyoming	Receiving	Jake Wilson	3 receptions, 35 yards

=== Northeastern State (DII) ===
Northeastern State RiverHawks (DII) (3–0) at Northern Colorado Bears (0–3) – Game summary

Quarter	1	2	3	4	OT	Total
RiverHawks (DII)	0	7	10	0	0	17
Bears	0	7	0	10	6	23

at Nottingham Field • Greeley, Colorado

- Date: September 19
- Game time: 6:00 p.m.
- Game weather: Sunny
- Game attendance: 3,500
- Referee: Justin Robinson
- TV: ESPN+

Game information

First quarter

No scoring plays

Second quarter

- (2:41) NEST – Marco Smith 1-yard run, Troy Nguyen kick (Drive: 6 plays, 80 yards, 2:35; Northeastern State 7–0)
- (0:25) UNCO – Marcus Mozer 71-yard pass from Kenny Lueth, Landon Richardson kick (Drive: 3 plays, 80 yards, 0:23; Tied 7–7)

Third quarter

- (9:56) NEST – Troy Nguyen 34-yard field goal (Drive: 13 plays, 58 yards, 5:04; Northeastern State 10–7)
- (1:51) NEST – Marco Smith 2-yard run, Troy Nguyen kick (Drive: 13 plays, 69 yards, 6:27; Northeastern State 17–7)

Fourth quarter

- (1:00) UNCO – Marcus Mozer 10-yard pass from Brayten Silbor, Landon Richardson kick (Drive: 4 plays, 89 yards, 0:30; Northeastern State 17–14)
- (0:14) UNCO – Landon Richardson 48-yard field goal (Drive: 6 plays, 27 yards, 0:43; Tied 17–17)

Overtime

- UNCO – Justin Guin 13-yard run (Drive: 3 plays, 25 yards, 0:00; Northern Colorado 23–17)

Statistics	NEST	UNCO
First downs	22	23
Plays–yards	75–320	72–410
Rushes–yards	46–165	25–104
Passing yards	155	306
Passing: comp–att–int	19–29–1	27–47–1
Turnovers	1	1
Time of possession	31:05	28:55

Team	Category	Player	Statistics
Northeastern State	Passing	Donnie Smith	19/29, 155 yards, INT
Northeastern State	Rushing	Jaylen Thompson	11 carries, 61 yards
Northeastern State	Receiving	Malachi Butler	4 receptions, 45 yards
Northern Colorado	Passing	Brayten Silbor	18/33, 206 yards, TD
Northern Colorado	Rushing	Brayten Silbor	3 carries, 36 yards
Northern Colorado	Receiving	Marcus Mozer	8 receptions, 129 yards, 2 TD

=== Utah Tech ===
Utah Tech Trailblazers (0–4) at Northern Colorado Bears (1–3) – Game summary

Quarter	1	2	3	4	Total
Trailblazers	0	0	0	0	0
Bears	0	0	0	0	0

at Nottingham Field • Greeley, Colorado

- Date: September 26
- Game time: 6:00 p.m.
- TV: ESPN+

Game information

First quarter
Second quarter
Third quarter
Fourth quarter

Statistics	UTU	UNCO
First downs		
Plays–yards		
Rushes–yards		
Passing yards		
Passing: comp–att–int		
Turnovers		
Time of possession		

Team	Category	Player	Statistics
Utah Tech	Passing		
Utah Tech	Rushing		
Utah Tech	Receiving		
Northern Colorado	Passing		
Northern Colorado	Rushing		
Northern Colorado	Receiving		

=== at No. 3 Montana ===
Northern Colorado Bears (2–3) at No. 3 Montana Grizzlies (4–1) – Game summary

Quarter	1	2	3	4	Total
Bears	0	0	0	0	0
No. 3 Grizzlies	0	0	0	0	0

at Washington–Grizzly Stadium • Missoula, Montana

- Date: October 3
- Game time: 2:00 p.m.

Game information

First quarter
Second quarter
Third quarter
Fourth quarter

Statistics	UNCO	MONT
First downs		
Plays–yards		
Rushes–yards		
Passing yards		
Passing: comp–att–int		
Turnovers		
Time of possession		

Team	Category	Player	Statistics
Northern Colorado	Passing		
Northern Colorado	Rushing		
Northern Colorado	Receiving		
Montana	Passing		
Montana	Rushing		
Montana	Receiving		

=== at Eastern Washington ===
Northern Colorado Bears (2–4) at Eastern Washington Eagles (1–5) – Game summary

Quarter	1	2	3	4	Total
Bears	0	0	0	0	0
Eagles	0	0	0	0	0

at Roos Field • Cheney, Washington

- Date: October 10
- Game time: 5:00 p.m.

Game information

First quarter
Second quarter
Third quarter
Fourth quarter

Statistics	UNCO	EWU
First downs		
Plays–yards		
Rushes–yards		
Passing yards		
Passing: comp–att–int		
Turnovers		
Time of possession		

Team	Category	Player	Statistics
Northern Colorado	Passing		
Northern Colorado	Rushing		
Northern Colorado	Receiving		
Eastern Washington	Passing		
Eastern Washington	Rushing		
Eastern Washington	Receiving		

=== Cal Poly ===
Cal Poly Mustangs (4–3) at Northern Colorado Bears (2–5) – Game summary

Quarter	1	2	3	4	Total
Mustangs	0	0	0	0	0
Bears	0	0	0	0	0

at Nottingham Field • Greeley, Colorado

- Date: October 17
- Game time: 6:00 p.m.

Game information

First quarter
Second quarter
Third quarter
Fourth quarter

Statistics	CP	UNCO
First downs		
Plays–yards		
Rushes–yards		
Passing yards		
Passing: comp–att–int		
Turnovers		
Time of possession		

Team	Category	Player	Statistics
Cal Poly	Passing		
Cal Poly	Rushing		
Cal Poly	Receiving		
Northern Colorado	Passing		
Northern Colorado	Rushing		
Northern Colorado	Receiving		

=== at No. 20 UC Davis ===
Northern Colorado Bears (3–5) at No. 20 UC Davis Aggies (4–3) – Game summary

Quarter	1	2	3	4	Total
Bears	0	0	0	0	0
No. 20 Aggies	0	0	0	0	0

at UC Davis Health Stadium • Davis, California

- Date: October 24
- Game time: 5:00 p.m.

Game information

First quarter
Second quarter
Third quarter
Fourth quarter

Statistics	UNCO	UCD
First downs		
Plays–yards		
Rushes–yards		
Passing yards		
Passing: comp–att–int		
Turnovers		
Time of possession		

Team	Category	Player	Statistics
Northern Colorado	Passing		
Northern Colorado	Rushing		
Northern Colorado	Receiving		
UC Davis	Passing		
UC Davis	Rushing		
UC Davis	Receiving		

=== at Southern Utah ===
Northern Colorado Bears (3–6) at Southern Utah Thunderbirds (3–6) – Game summary

Quarter	1	2	3	4	Total
Bears	0	0	0	0	0
Thunderbirds	0	0	0	0	0

at Eccles Coliseum • Cedar City, Utah

- Date: November 7
- Game time: 1:00 p.m.

Game information

First quarter
Second quarter
Third quarter
Fourth quarter

Statistics	UNCO	SUU
First downs		
Plays–yards		
Rushes–yards		
Passing yards		
Passing: comp–att–int		
Turnovers		
Time of possession		

Team	Category	Player	Statistics
Northern Colorado	Passing		
Northern Colorado	Rushing		
Northern Colorado	Receiving		
Southern Utah	Passing		
Southern Utah	Rushing		
Southern Utah	Receiving		

=== No. 2 Montana State ===
No. 2 Montana State Bobcats (9–1) at Northern Colorado Bears (3–7) – Game summary

Quarter	1	2	3	4	Total
No. 2 Bobcats	0	0	0	0	0
Bears	0	0	0	0	0

at Nottingham Field • Greeley, Colorado

- Date: November 14
- Game time: 12:00 p.m.

Game information

First quarter
Second quarter
Third quarter
Fourth quarter

Statistics	MTST	UNCO
First downs		
Plays–yards		
Rushes–yards		
Passing yards		
Passing: comp–att–int		
Turnovers		
Time of possession		

Team	Category	Player	Statistics
Montana State	Passing		
Montana State	Rushing		
Montana State	Receiving		
Northern Colorado	Passing		
Northern Colorado	Rushing		
Northern Colorado	Receiving		

=== at No. 12 Northern Arizona ===
Northern Colorado Bears (3–8) at No. 12 Northern Arizona Lumberjacks (8–3) – Game summary

Quarter	1	2	3	4	Total
Bears	0	0	0	0	0
No. 12 Lumberjacks	0	0	0	0	0

at Walkup Skydome • Flagstaff, Arizona

- Date: November 21
- Game time: 2:00 p.m.

Game information

First quarter
Second quarter
Third quarter
Fourth quarter

Statistics	UNCO	NAU
First downs		
Plays–yards		
Rushes–yards		
Passing yards		
Passing: comp–att–int		
Turnovers		
Time of possession		

Team	Category	Player	Statistics
Northern Colorado	Passing		
Northern Colorado	Rushing		
Northern Colorado	Receiving		
Northern Arizona	Passing		
Northern Arizona	Rushing		
Northern Arizona	Receiving		

== Rankings ==
Ranking movements Legend: — = Not ranked RV = Received votes
	Week														
Poll	Pre	1	2	3	4	5	6	7	8	9	10	11	12	13	Final
STATS	—														
Coaches	RV														
