= 2026 Northern Arizona Lumberjacks football team =

American college football season

2026 Northern Arizona Lumberjacks football

FCS Playoffs
- Conference: Big Sky Conference

Ranking
- STATS: No. 12
- FCS Coaches: No. 10
- Record: 9–3 (7–2 Big Sky)
- Head coach: Brian Wright (3rd season)
- Offensive coordinator: Bryan Larson (3rd season)
- Offensive scheme: Multiple
- Defensive coordinator: Trenton Greene (1st season)
- Home stadium: Walkup Skydome

2026 Big Sky Conference football standings
	Conf.			Overall
Team	W		L	W		L
No. 2 Montana State $^	8	–	1	11	–	1
No. 15 Weber State ^	7	–	2	8	–	4
No. 12 Northern Arizona ^	7	–	2	9	–	3
No. 8 Montana ^	6	–	3	8	–	4
No. 23 UC Davis	6	–	3	8	–	4
Idaho	5	–	4	5	–	7
Southern Utah	4	–	4	6	–	6
No. 25 Idaho State ^	4	–	5	7	–	5
Cal Poly	3	–	6	4	–	8
Portland State	3	–	6	3	–	9
Eastern Washington	2	–	7	3	–	9
Northern Colorado	2	–	7	3	–	9
Utah Tech	1	–	8	1	–	11
$ – Conference champion; ^ – FCS playoff participant; As of November 22, 2026; Rankings from STATS Poll

The 2026 Northern Arizona Lumberjacks football team will represent Northern Arizona University as a member of the Big Sky Conference during the 2026 NCAA Division I FCS football season. The Lumberjacks were led by third-year head coach Brian Wright and play at Walkup Skydome in Flagstaff, Arizona.

== Schedule ==
Date	Time	Opponent	Rank	Site	TV	Result	Attendance
August 29	2:00 p.m.	Eastern Washington	No. 25	Walkup Skydome; Flagstaff, AZ	ESPN+	W 34–27	8,224
September 5	6:30 p.m.	at Arizona*	No. 22	Casino Del Sol Stadium; Tucson, AZ	ESPN+	L 7–35	40,129
September 12	2:00 p.m.	Incarnate Word*	No. 24	Walkup Skydome; Flagstaff, AZ	ESPN+	W 38–28	9,457
September 19	5:00 p.m.	at Utah Tech (Note: The game against Utah Tech, a fellow member of the Big Sky Conference, was a non-conference game and did not count in the league standings.)*	No. 20	Greater Zion Stadium; St. George, UT	ESPN+	W 35–23	3,447
September 26	7:30 p.m.	at No. 1 Montana State	No. 18	Bobcat Stadium; Bozeman, MT	ESPN2	L 14–28	21,857
October 3	5:00 p.m.	at No. 12 Idaho State	No. 19	ICCU Dome; Pocatello, ID	ESPN+	W 38–31	6,878
October 10	2:00 p.m.	No. 2 Montana	No. 13	Walkup Skydome; Flagstaff, AZ	ESPN+	W 49–44	8,413
October 17	4:00 p.m.	Portland State^{†}	No. 8	Walkup Skydome; Flagstaff, AZ	ESPN+	W 38–25	8,127
October 31	12:00 p.m.	at Southern Utah	No. 7	Eccles Coliseum; Cedar City, UT (Grand Canyon Trophy Game)	ESPN+	W 34–27	2,814
November 7	3:00 p.m.	at Cal Poly	No. 6	Alex G. Spanos Stadium; San Luis Obispo, CA	ESPN+	W 38–10	6,234
November 14	4:00 p.m.	No. 18 Weber State	No. 5	Walkup Skydome; Flagstaff, AZ	ESPN+	L 21–25	7,857
November 21	2:00 p.m.	Northern Colorado	No. 12	Walkup Skydome; Flagstaff, AZ	ESPN+	W 35–26	6,879
November 28	2:00 p.m.	LIU*	No. 10	Walkup Skydome; Flagstaff, AZ (NCAA Division I First Round)	ESPN+		
*Non-conference game; ^{†}Homecoming; Rankings from STATS Poll released prior to the game; All times are in Mountain time

== Game summaries ==
=== Eastern Washington ===
Eastern Washington Eagles (0–0) at No. 25 Northern Arizona Lumberjacks (0–0) – Game summary

Quarter	1	2	3	4	Total
Eagles	10	14	0	3	27
No. 25 Lumberjacks	3	14	3	14	34

at Walkup Skydome • Flagstaff, Arizona

- Date: August 29
- Game time: 2:00 p.m.
- Game weather: none (played indoors)
- Game attendance: 8,224
- Referee: Jeff Rink
- TV announcers (ESPN+): James Malamas, Kevin Stephens and Adriana Sparks

Game information

First quarter

- EWU – Wesley Garrett 3-yard pass from Nate Bell (Soren McKee kick), 10:22. Eagles 7–0. Drive: 3 plays, 6 yards, 1:31.
- NAU – Francisco Orduno Jr. 24-yard field goal, 5:47. Eagles 7–3. Drive: 7 plays, 14 yards, 3:04.
- EWU – Soren McKee 53-yard field goal, 1:28. Eagles 10–3. Drive: 12 plays, 39 yards, 4:19.

Second quarter

- EWU – Nate Bell 12-yard run (Soren McKee kick), 6:13. Eagles 17–3. Drive: 9 plays, 86 yards, 3:20.
- EWU – Jaxon Branch 14-yard pass from Nate Bell (Soren McKee kick), 2:57. Eagles 24–3. Drive: 4 plays, 27 yards, 1:59.
- NAU – Lindsey Graves 100-yard kickoff return (Francisco Orduno Jr. kick), 2:44. Eagles 24–10.
- NAU – Quran Gossett 2-yard run (Francisco Orduno Jr. kick), 0:23. Eagles 24–17. Drive: 6 plays, 33 yards, 1:27.

Third quarter

- NAU – Francisco Orduno Jr. 25-yard field goal, 7:08. Eagles 24–20. Drive: 14 plays, 67 yards, 7:52.

Fourth quarter

- NAU – Jeter Purdy 30-yard pass from Ty Pennington (Francisco Orduno Jr. kick), 13:35. Lumberjacks 27–24. Drive: 9 plays, 83 yards, 4:32.
- EWU – Soren McKee 37-yard field goal, 10:03. Tied 27–27. Drive: 8 plays, 55 yards, 2:43.
- NAU – Nassim Isaac 2-yard pass from Ty Pennington (Francisco Orduno Jr. kick), 3:54. Lumberjacks 34–27. Drive: 11 plays, 75 yards, 6:09.

Statistics	EWU	NAU
First downs	26	22
Plays–yards	77–429	67–365
Rushes–yards	30–122	40–201
Passing yards	307	164
Passing: comp–att–int	30–47–1	15–27–1
Turnovers	2	1
Time of possession	28:05	31:55

Team	Category	Player	Statistics
Eastern Washington	Passing	Nate Bell	30/47, 307 yards, 2 TD, INT
Eastern Washington	Rushing	Kevin Allen III	8 carries, 47 yards
Eastern Washington	Receiving	Jaxon Branch	7 receptions, 88 yards, TD
Northern Arizona	Passing	Ty Pennington	15/27, 164 yards, 2 TD, INT
Northern Arizona	Rushing	Quran Gossett	21 carries, 103 yards, TD
Northern Arizona	Receiving	Jeter Purdy	7 receptions, 105 yards, TD

=== at Arizona (FBS) ===
No. 22 Northern Arizona Lumberjacks (1–0) at Arizona Wildcats (FBS) (0–0) – Game summary

Quarter	1	2	3	4	Total
No. 22 Lumberjacks	0	0	0	7	7
Wildcats (FBS)	7	14	7	7	35

at Casino Del Sol Stadium • Tucson, AZ

- Date: September 5
- Game time: 6:30 p.m.
- Game weather: Sunny, 93 °F (34 °C)
- Game attendance: 40,129
- Referee: Kevin Boitmann
- TV announcers (ESPN+): Chris Sylvester and Jordan Reid

Game information

First quarter

- (11:32) ARIZ – Tre Spivey 20-yard pass from Noah Fifita, Michael Salgado-Medina kick (Drive: 9 plays, 75 yards, 3:28; Arizona 7–0)

Second quarter

- (10:41) ARIZ – Brandon Phelps 21-yard pass from Noah Fifita, Michael Salgado-Medina kick (Drive: 6 plays, 57 yards, 2:45; Arizona 14–0)
- (3:20) ARIZ – Kedrick Reescano 1-yard run, Michael Salgado-Medina kick (Drive: 9 plays, 56 yards, 4:41; Arizona 21–0)

Third quarter

- (5:01) ARIZ – Antwan Roberts 14-yard run, Michael Salgado-Medina kick (Drive: 4 plays, 50 yards, 1:38; Arizona 28–0)

Fourth quarter

- (13:52) ARIZ – Kedrick Reescano 1-yard run, Michael Salgado-Medina kick (Drive: 6 plays, 32 yards, 2:18; Arizona 35–0)
- (10:55) NAU – Noble Young-Blackgoat 36-yard interception return, Francisco Orduno Jr. kick (Arizona 35–7)

Statistics	NAU	ARIZ
First downs	8	28
Plays–yards	52–193	72–520
Rushes–yards	21–(-7)	35–206
Passing yards	200	314
Passing: Comp–Att–Int	19–31–1	27–37–1
Turnovers	1	3
Time of possession	27:48	32:12

Team	Category	Player	Statistics
Northern Arizona	Passing	Ty Pennington	15/26, 180 yards, INT
Northern Arizona	Rushing	Quran Gossett	11 carries, 20 yards
Northern Arizona	Receiving	Joey Stout	6 receptions, 39 yards
Arizona	Passing	Noah Fifita	22/29, 262 yards, 2 TD
Arizona	Rushing	Kedrick Reescano	10 carries, 48 yards, 2 TD
Arizona	Receiving	Gio Richardson	8 receptions, 96 yards

=== Incarnate Word ===
Incarnate Word Cardinals (1–0) at No. 24 Northern Arizona Lumberjacks (1–1) – Game summary

Quarter	1	2	3	4	Total
Cardinals	0	0	0	0	0
No. 24 Lumberjacks	0	0	0	0	0

at Walkup Skydome • Flagstaff, Arizona

- Date: September 12
- Game time: 2:00 p.m.
- TV: ESPN+

Game information

First quarter
Second quarter
Third quarter
Fourth quarter

Statistics	UIW	NAU
First downs		
Plays–yards		
Rushes–yards		
Passing yards		
Passing: comp–att–int		
Turnovers		
Time of possession		

Team	Category	Player	Statistics
Incarnate Word	Passing		
Incarnate Word	Rushing		
Incarnate Word	Receiving		
Northern Arizona	Passing		
Northern Arizona	Rushing		
Northern Arizona	Receiving		

=== at Utah Tech ===
No. 20 Northern Arizona Lumberjacks (2–1) at Utah Tech Trailblazers (0–3) – Game summary

Quarter	1	2	3	4	Total
No. 20 Lumberjacks	0	0	0	0	0
Trailblazers	0	0	0	0	0

at Greater Zion Stadium • St. George, Utah

- Date: September 19
- Game time: 5:00 p.m.
- TV: ESPN+

Game information

First quarter
Second quarter
Third quarter
Fourth quarter

Statistics	NAU	UTU
First downs		
Plays–yards		
Rushes–yards		
Passing yards		
Passing: comp–att–int		
Turnovers		
Time of possession		

Team	Category	Player	Statistics
Northern Arizona	Passing		
Northern Arizona	Rushing		
Northern Arizona	Receiving		
Utah Tech	Passing		
Utah Tech	Rushing		
Utah Tech	Receiving		

=== at No. 1 Montana State ===
No. 18 Northern Arizona Lumberjacks (3–1) at No. 1 Montana State Bobcats (4–0) – Game summary

Quarter	1	2	3	4	Total
No. 18 Lumberjacks	0	0	0	0	0
No. 1 Bobcats	0	0	0	0	0

at Bobcat Stadium • Bozeman, Montana

- Date: September 26
- Game time: 7:30 p.m.
- TV announcers (ESPN2): Ted Emrich and Fozzy Whittaker

Game information

First quarter
Second quarter
Third quarter
Fourth quarter

Statistics	NAU	MTST
First downs		
Plays–yards		
Rushes–yards		
Passing yards		
Passing: comp–att–int		
Turnovers		
Time of possession		

Team	Category	Player	Statistics
Northern Arizona	Passing		
Northern Arizona	Rushing		
Northern Arizona	Receiving		
Montana State	Passing		
Montana State	Rushing		
Montana State	Receiving		

=== at No. 12 Idaho State ===
No. 19 Northern Arizona Lumberjacks (3–2) at No. 12 Idaho State Bengals (4–0) – Game summary

Quarter	1	2	3	4	Total
No. 19 Lumberjacks	0	0	0	0	0
No. 12 Bengals	0	0	0	0	0

at ICCU Dome • Pocatello, Idaho

- Date: October 3
- Game time: 5:00 p.m.

Game information

First quarter
Second quarter
Third quarter
Fourth quarter

Statistics	NAU	IDST
First downs		
Plays–yards		
Rushes–yards		
Passing yards		
Passing: comp–att–int		
Turnovers		
Time of possession		

Team	Category	Player	Statistics
Northern Arizona	Passing		
Northern Arizona	Rushing		
Northern Arizona	Receiving		
Idaho State	Passing		
Idaho State	Rushing		
Idaho State	Receiving		

=== No. 2 Montana ===
No. 2 Montana Grizzlies (5–1) at No. 13 Northern Arizona Lumberjacks (4–2) – Game summary

Quarter	1	2	3	4	Total
No. 2 Grizzlies	0	0	0	0	0
No. 13 Lumberjacks	0	0	0	0	0

at Walkup Skydome • Flagstaff, Arizona

- Date: October 10
- Game time: 2:00 p.m.

Game information

First quarter
Second quarter
Third quarter
Fourth quarter

Statistics	MONT	NAU
First downs		
Plays–yards		
Rushes–yards		
Passing yards		
Passing: comp–att–int		
Turnovers		
Time of possession		

Team	Category	Player	Statistics
Montana	Passing		
Montana	Rushing		
Montana	Receiving		
Northern Arizona	Passing		
Northern Arizona	Rushing		
Northern Arizona	Receiving		

=== Portland State ===
Portland State Vikings (2–4) at No. 8 Northern Arizona Lumberjacks (5–2) – Game summary

Quarter	1	2	3	4	Total
Vikings	0	0	0	0	0
No. 8 Lumberjacks	0	0	0	0	0

at Walkup Skydome • Flagstaff, Arizona

- Date: October 17
- Game time: 4:00 p.m.

Game information

First quarter
Second quarter
Third quarter
Fourth quarter

Statistics	PRST	NAU
First downs		
Plays–yards		
Rushes–yards		
Passing yards		
Passing: comp–att–int		
Turnovers		
Time of possession		

Team	Category	Player	Statistics
Portland State	Passing		
Portland State	Rushing		
Portland State	Receiving		
Northern Arizona	Passing		
Northern Arizona	Rushing		
Northern Arizona	Receiving		

=== at Southern Utah (Grand Canyon Trophy Game) ===
No. 7 Northern Arizona Lumberjacks (6–2) at Southern Utah Thunderbirds (3–5) – Game summary

Quarter	1	2	3	4	Total
No. 7 Lumberjacks	0	0	0	0	0
Thunderbirds	0	0	0	0	0

at Eccles Coliseum • Cedar City, Utah

- Date: October 31
- Game time: 12:00 p.m.

Game information

First quarter
Second quarter
Third quarter
Fourth quarter

Statistics	NAU	SUU
First downs		
Plays–yards		
Rushes–yards		
Passing yards		
Passing: comp–att–int		
Turnovers		
Time of possession		

Team	Category	Player	Statistics
Northern Arizona	Passing		
Northern Arizona	Rushing		
Northern Arizona	Receiving		
Southern Utah	Passing		
Southern Utah	Rushing		
Southern Utah	Receiving		

=== at Cal Poly ===
No. 6 Northern Arizona Lumberjacks (7–2) at Cal Poly Mustangs (4–6) – Game summary

Quarter	1	2	3	4	Total
No. 6 Lumberjacks	0	0	0	0	0
Mustangs	0	0	0	0	0

at Mustang Memorial Field • San Luis Obispo, California

- Date: November 7
- Game time: 2:00 p.m.

Game information

First quarter
Second quarter
Third quarter
Fourth quarter

Statistics	NAU	CP
First downs		
Plays–yards		
Rushes–yards		
Passing yards		
Passing: comp–att–int		
Turnovers		
Time of possession		

Team	Category	Player	Statistics
Northern Arizona	Passing		
Northern Arizona	Rushing		
Northern Arizona	Receiving		
Cal Poly	Passing		
Cal Poly	Rushing		
Cal Poly	Receiving		

=== No. 18 Weber State ===
No. 18 Weber State Wildcats (6–4) at No. 5 Northern Arizona Lumberjacks (8–2) – Game summary

Quarter	1	2	3	4	Total
No. 18 Wildcats	0	0	0	0	0
No. 5 Lumberjacks	0	0	0	0	0

at Walkup Skydome • Flagstaff, Arizona

- Date: November 14
- Game time: 2:00 p.m.

Game information

First quarter
Second quarter
Third quarter
Fourth quarter

Statistics	WEB	NAU
First downs		
Plays–yards		
Rushes–yards		
Passing yards		
Passing: comp–att–int		
Turnovers		
Time of possession		

Team	Category	Player	Statistics
Weber State	Passing		
Weber State	Rushing		
Weber State	Receiving		
Northern Arizona	Passing		
Northern Arizona	Rushing		
Northern Arizona	Receiving		

=== Northern Colorado ===
Northern Colorado Bears (3–8) at No. 12 Northern Arizona Lumberjacks (8–3) – Game summary

Quarter	1	2	3	4	Total
Bears	0	0	0	0	0
No. 12 Lumberjacks	0	0	0	0	0

at Walkup Skydome • Flagstaff, Arizona

- Date: November 21
- Game time: 2:00 p.m.

Game information

First quarter
Second quarter
Third quarter
Fourth quarter

Statistics	UNCO	NAU
First downs		
Plays–yards		
Rushes–yards		
Passing yards		
Passing: comp–att–int		
Turnovers		
Time of possession		

Team	Category	Player	Statistics
Northern Colorado	Passing		
Northern Colorado	Rushing		
Northern Colorado	Receiving		
Northern Arizona	Passing		
Northern Arizona	Rushing		
Northern Arizona	Receiving		

== Ranking movements ==
Ranking movements Legend: ██ Increase in ranking ██ Decrease in ranking
	Week														
Poll	Pre	1	2	3	4	5	6	7	8	9	10	11	12	13	Final
STATS FCS	25	22	24	20	18	19	13	8	7	7	6	5	12		
Coaches	24	20	23	19	17	19	14	10	7	7	6	5	10		
