= 2026 Southern Utah Thunderbirds football team =

American college football season

2026 Southern Utah Thunderbirds football
- Conference: Big Sky Conference
- Record: 6–6 (4–4 Big Sky)
- Head coach: DeLane Fitzgerald (5th season)
- Defensive coordinator: John Kelling (5th season)
- Home stadium: Eccles Coliseum

2026 Big Sky Conference football standings
	Conf.			Overall
Team	W		L	W		L
No. 2 Montana State $^	7	–	1	10	–	1
No. 12 Northern Arizona	6	–	2	8	–	3
No. 8 Montana	6	–	2	8	–	3
No. 15 Weber State	6	–	2	7	–	4
No. 23 UC Davis	5	–	3	7	–	4
Idaho	5	–	3	5	–	6
Southern Utah	4	–	4	5	–	6
No. 25 Idaho State	3	–	5	6	–	5
Cal Poly	3	–	5	4	–	7
Eastern Washington	2	–	6	3	–	8
Northern Colorado	2	–	6	3	–	8
Portland State	2	–	6	2	–	9
Utah Tech	1	–	7	1	–	10
$ – Conference champion; ^ – FCS playoff participant; As of November 22, 2026; Rankings from STATS Poll

The 2026 Southern Utah Thunderbirds football team represents Southern Utah University as a member of the Big Sky Conference during the 2026 NCAA Division I FCS football season. Led by fifth-year head coach DeLane Fitzgerald, the Thunderbirds play home games on campus at Eccles Coliseum in Cedar City, Utah. The football program returns to the Big Sky for the first time since the 2021 season.

== Schedule ==
Date	Time	Opponent	Site	TV	Result	Attendance
August 29	7:00 p.m.	at No. 2 Montana	Washington–Grizzly Stadium; Missoula, MT	KUPX	L 21–28	26,829
September 5	6:00 p.m.	Weber State (Note: The game against Weber State, a fellow member of the Big Sky Conference, is a non-conference game and not count in the league standings.)*	Eccles Coliseum; Cedar City, UT (Beehive Bowl)	ESPN+	W 47–42	5,805
September 12	5:00 p.m.	at Colorado State*	Canvas Stadium; Fort Collins, CO	CBSSN	L 24–58	35,749
September 19	12:00 p.m.	at St. Thomas*	O'Shaughnessy Stadium; Saint Paul, MN	Midco Sports Plus	L 26–28	2,182
September 26	6:00 p.m.	No. 14 Idaho State^{†}	Eccles Coliseum; Cedar City, UT	ESPN+	L 24–28	6,255
October 3	6:00 p.m.	at Utah Tech	Greater Zion Stadium; St. George, UT	ESPN+	W 46–33	6,038
October 17	6:00 p.m.	No. 14 UC Davis	Eccles Coliseum; Cedar City, UT	ESPN+	W 38–17	3,136
October 24	3:00 p.m.	at Idaho	Kibbie Dome; Moscow, ID	ESPN+	L 28–31	10,369
October 31	1:00 p.m.	No. 7 Northern Arizona	Eccles Coliseum; Cedar City, UT (Grand Canyon Trophy Game)	ESPN+	L 27–34	2,814
November 7	1:00 p.m.	Northern Colorado	Eccles Coliseum; Cedar City, UT	ESPN+	W 31–24	2,562
November 13	8:00 p.m.	at Portland State	Hillsboro Stadium; Hillsboro, OR	ESPN+	W 23–21	1,435
November 21	12:00 p.m.	Chicago State*	Eccles Coliseum; Cedar City, UT	ESPN+	W 65–3	2,578
*Non-conference game; ^{†}Homecoming; Rankings from STATS Poll released prior to the game; All times are in Mountain time

== Game summaries ==
=== at No. 2 Montana ===
Southern Utah Thunderbirds (0–0) at No. 2 Montana Grizzlies (0–0) – Game summary

Quarter	1	2	3	4	Total
Thunderbirds	0	3	6	12	21
No. 2 Grizzlies	7	7	7	7	28

at Washington–Grizzly Stadium • Missoula, Montana

- Date: August 29
- Game time: 7:00 p.m.
- Game weather: Cloudy • Temperature: 72 °F (22 °C) • Wind: E at 10 miles per hour (16 km/h)
- Game attendance: 26,829
- Referee: Justin Robinson
- TV announcers (ESPN+): Trey Bender, Jordan Tripp and Kyle Hansen

Game information

First quarter

- MONT – Eli Gillman 85-yard pass from Keali'i Ah Yat (Jo Silver kick), 13:42. Grizzlies 7–0. Drive: 1 play, 85 yards, 0:14.

Second quarter

- SUU – Jayden Rogers 50-yard field goal, 13:27. Grizzlies 7–3. Drive: 12 plays, 61 yards, 7:14.
- MONT – Eli Gillman 29-yard run (Jo Silver kick), 11:50. Grizzlies 14–3. Drive: 6 plays, 75 yards, 1:37.

Third quarter

- SUU – Floyd Chalk IV 6-yard run (run failed), 10:09. Grizzlies 14–9. Drive: 8 plays, 75 yards, 4:51.
- MONT – Keali'i Ah Yat 3-yard run (Jo Silver kick), 8:48. Grizzlies 21–9. Drive: 4 plays, 34 yards, 1:30.

Fourth quarter

- SUU – Joshua Acord 13-yard pass from Will Burns (run failed), 14:56. Grizzlies 21–15. Drive: 14 plays, 75 yards, 8:52.
- SUU – Joshua Acord 58-yard pass from Will Burns (Jayden Rogers kick BLOCKED), 11:41. Tied 21–21. Drive: 4 plays, 71 yards, 1:41.
- MONT – Lekeldrick Bridges 53-yard pass from Keali'i Ah Yat (Jo Silver kick), 3:14. Grizzlies 28–21. Drive: 5 plays, 80 yards, 2:17.

Statistics	SUU	MONT
First downs	31	14
Plays–yards	83–510	46–337
Rushes–yards	49–259	18–73
Passing yards	251	264
Passing: comp–att–int	24–34–1	15–28–1
Turnovers	1	2
Time of possession	43:34	16:26

Team	Category	Player	Statistics
Southern Utah	Passing	Will Burns	24/34, 251 yards, 2 TD, INT
Southern Utah	Rushing	Will Burns	15 carries, 119 yards
Southern Utah	Receiving	Joshua Acord	6 receptions, 86 yards, 2 TD
Montana	Passing	Keali'i Ah Yat	15/28, 264 yards, 2 TD, INT
Montana	Rushing	Eli Gillman	13 carries, 76 yards, TD
Montana	Receiving	Eli Gillman	2 receptions, 93 yards, TD

=== Weber State (Beehive Bowl) ===
Weber State Wildcats (1–0) at Southern Utah Thunderbirds (0–1) – Game summary

Quarter	1	2	3	4	Total
Wildcats	7	22	7	6	42
Thunderbirds	7	13	21	6	47

at Eccles Coliseum • Cedar City, Utah

- Date: September 5
- Game time: 6:00 p.m.
- Game weather: Sunny • Temperature: 79 °F (26 °C) • Wind: N at 20 miles per hour (32 km/h)
- Game attendance: 5,805
- Referee: Jeff Rink
- TV: ESPN+

Game information

First quarter

- SUU – Will Burns 11-yard run (Jayden Rogers kick), 10:40. Thunderbirds 7–0. Drive: 4 plays, 50 yards, 1:47.
- WEB – Mapa Vaenuku 1-yard run (David Dellenbach kick), 0:36. Tied 7–7. Drive: 14 plays, 95 yards, 6:36.

Second quarter

- WEB – Zach Smith 25-yard blocked punt return (David Dellenbach run), 13:30. Wildcats 15–7.
- SUU – Will Burns 75-yard run (pass failed), 13:18. Wildcats 15–13. Drive: 1 play, 75 yards, 0:12.
- WEB – Spencer Ferguson 28-yard run (David Dellenbach kick), 10:24. Wildcats 22–13. Drive: 11 plays, 75 yards, 2:54.
- SUU – Floyd Chalk IV 4-yard run (Jayden Rogers kick), 6:18. Wildcats 22–20. Drive: 9 plays, 75 yards, 4:06.
- WEB – Noah Kjar 16-yard pass from Nate Dahle (David Dellenbach kick), 0:20. Wildcats 29–20. Drive: 8 plays, 93 yards, 1:35.

Third quarter

- SUU – Floyd Chalk IV 39-yard run (Jayden Rogers kick), 13:14. Wildcats 29–27. Drive: 4 plays, 65 yards, 1:46.
- SUU – Joshua Acord 16-yard pass from Will Burns (Jayden Rogers kick), 10:55. Thunderbirds 34–29. Drive: 3 plays, 40 yards, 1:19.
- WEB – Spencer Ferguson 1-yard run (David Dellenbach kick), 9:00. Wildcats 36–34. Drive: 5 plays, 75 yards, 1:55.
- SUU – Devin Downing 16-yard pass from Will Burns (Jayden Rogers kick), 2:49. Thunderbirds 41–36. Drive: 10 plays, 75 yards, 6:11.

Fourth quarter

- WEB – Noah Kjar 24-yard pass from Nate Dahle (pass failed), 13:53. Wildcats 42–41. Drive: 1 play, 24 yards, 0:05.
- SUU – Floyd Chalk IV 22-yard run (pass failed), 9:13. Thunderbirds 47–42. Drive: 8 plays, 62 yards, 4:40.

Statistics	WEB	SUU
First downs	22	26
Plays–yards	76–464	70–514
Rushes–yards	32–182	52–368
Passing yards	282	146
Passing: comp–att–int	21–44–1	10–18–1
Turnovers	2	1
Time of possession	26:10	33:50

Team	Category	Player	Statistics
Weber State	Passing	Nate Dahle	21/44, 282 yards, 2 TD, INT
Weber State	Rushing	Spencer Ferguson	16 carries, 91 yards, 2 TD
Weber State	Receiving	Noah Kjar	9 receptions, 150 yards, 2 TD
Southern Utah	Passing	Will Burns	10/18, 146 yards, 2 TD, INT
Southern Utah	Rushing	Floyd Chalk IV	24 carries, 183 yards, 3 TD
Southern Utah	Receiving	David Spjut	1 reception, 44 yards

=== at Colorado State (FBS) ===
Southern Utah Thunderbirds (1–1) at Colorado State Rams (FBS) (1–0) – Game summary

Quarter	1	2	3	4	Total
Thunderbirds	7	14	0	3	24
Rams (FBS)	17	31	3	7	58

at Canvas Stadium • Fort Collins, Colorado

- Date: September 12
- Game time: 5:00 p.m.
- Game weather: Cloudy • Temperature: 71 °F (22 °C) • Wind: SE at 7 miles per hour (11 km/h)
- Game attendance: 35,749
- Referee: Dwayne Johnson
- TV announcers (CBSSN): Alex Del Barrio and Emory Hunt

Game information

First quarter

- CSU – Cedric Ross 68-yard pass from Hauss Hejny (Kali Nguma kick), 14:13. Rams 7–0. Drive: 2 plays, 75 yards, 0:47.
- CSU – Terrence Smith Jr. 38-yard pass from Hauss Hejny (Kali Nguma kick), 13:21. Rams 14–0. Drive: 2 plays, 45 yards, 0:44.
- SUU - David Spjut 18-yard pass from Will Burns (Jayden Rogers kick), 9:10. Rams 14-7. Drive: 10 plays, 67 yards, 4:04.
- CSU - Kali Nguma 40-yard field goal, 4:54. Rams 17-7. Drive: 10 plays, 53 yards, 4:16.

Second quarter

- CSU – Mel Brown 1-yard run (Kali Nguma kick), 12:58. Rams 24–7. Drive: 3 plays, 81 yards, 0:23.
- SUU – Floyd Chalk IV 58-yard run (Jayden Rogers kick), 9:57. Rams 24–14. Drive: 3 plays, 71 yards, 0:52.
- SUU - Floyd Chalk IV 3-yard run (Jayden Rogers kick), 4:12. Rams 24-21. Drive: 3 plays, 81 yards, 1:22.
- CSU - Mel Brown 73-yard run (Kali Nguma kick), 3:24. Rams 31-21. Drive: 2 plays, 75 yards, 0:48.
- CSU - Jackson Harper 17-yard pass from Hauss Hejny (Kali Nguma kick), 1:54. Rams 38-21. Drive: 2 plays, 18 yards, 0:21.
- CSU - Terrence Smith Jr. 33-yard pass from Hauss Hejny (Kali Nguma kick), 0:32. Rams 45-21. Drive: 4 plays, 70 yards, 0:42.
- CSU - Kali Nguma 51-yard field goal, 0:03. Rams 48-21. Drive: 4 plays, 8 yards, 0:24.

Third quarter

- CSU – Kali Nguma 23-yard field goal, 5:25. Rams 51–21. Drive: 10 plays, 63 yards, 3:55.

Fourth quarter

- SUU – Jayden Rogers 37-yard field goal, 12:44. Rams 51–24. Drive: 12 plays, 55 yards, 7:37.
- CSU – Hauss Hejny 75-yard run (Kali Nguma kick), 12:31. Rams 58–24. Drive: 1 play, 75 yards, 0:13.

Statistics	SUU	CSU
First downs	18	22
Plays–yards	64–442	69–678
Rushes–yards	39–206	32–296
Passing yards	236	382
Passing: comp–att–int	13–25–2	22–37–1
Turnovers	4	1
Time of possession	33:18	26:42

Team	Category	Player	Statistics
Southern Utah	Passing	Will Burns	12/23, 233 yards, TD, 2 INT
Southern Utah	Rushing	Floyd Chalk IV	17 carries, 144 yards, 2 TD
Southern Utah	Receiving	Mark Bails	4 receptions, 138 yards
Colorado State	Passing	Hauss Hejny	18/20, 325 yards, 4 TD, INT
Colorado State	Rushing	Mel Brown	9 carries, 171 yards, 2 TD
Colorado State	Receiving	Jackson Harper	6 receptions, 102 yards, TD

=== at St. Thomas (MN) ===
Southern Utah Thunderbirds (1–2) at St. Thomas Tommies (2–1) – Game summary

Quarter	1	2	3	4	Total
Thunderbirds	10	7	3	6	26
Tommies	7	14	7	0	28

at O'Shaughnessy Stadium • St. Paul, Minnesota

- Date: September 19
- Game time: 12:00 p.m.
- Game weather: Rain • Temperature: 62 °F (17 °C) • Wind: S 2 miles per hour (3.2 km/h)
- Game attendance: 2,182
- Referee: Shay John
- TV announcers (Midco+): Sam Ekstrom and Joe Moline

Game information

First quarter

- STMN – Quentin Cobb-Butler 63-yard pass from Nicholas Peipert (Ben Hoiland kick), 9:29. Tommies 7–0. Drive: 4 plays, 80 yards, 2:05.
- SUU – Jayden Rogers 20-yard field goal, 5:15. Tommies 7–3. Drive: 10 plays, 65 yards, 4:14.
- SUU – Parker Vance 29-yard interception return (Jayden Rogers kick), 8:52. Thunderbirds 10–7.

Second quarter

- STMN – Joseph Koch 1-yard run (Ben Hoiland kick), 8:02. Tommies 14–10. Drive: 5 plays, 51 yards, 2:00.
- SUU – Will Burns 9-yard run (Jayden Rogers kick), 2:57. Thunderbirds 17–14. Drive: 8 plays, 75 yards, 5:05.
- STMN – Nicholas Peipert 1-yard run (Ben Hoiland kick), 0:00. Tommies 21–17. Drive: 11 plays, 77 yards, 2:51.

Third quarter

- STMN – Gabriel Abel 78-yard run (Ben Hoiland kick), 9:37. Tommies 28–17. Drive: 2 plays, 80 yards, 0:48.
- SUU – Jayden Rogers 22-yard field goal, 3:47. Tommies 28–20. Drive: 4 plays, 8 yards, 1:42.

Fourth quarter

- SUU – Mark Bails Jr. 18-yard pass from Will Burns (pass failed), 0:24. Tommies 28–26. Drive: 4 plays, 45 yards, 0:22.

Statistics	SUU	STMN
First downs	17	16
Plays–yards	63–367	68–406
Rushes–yards	35–146	38–175
Passing yards	221	231
Passing: comp–att–int	20–28–0	16–30–1
Turnovers	1	1
Time of possession	31:35	28:25

Team	Category	Player	Statistics
Southern Utah	Passing	Will Burns	20/28, 221 yards, TD
Southern Utah	Rushing	Floyd Chalk	26 carries, 118 yards
Southern Utah	Receiving	Mark Bails	4 receptions, 106 yards, TD
St. Thomas (MN)	Passing	Nicholas Peipert	16/29, 231 yards, TD, INT
St. Thomas (MN)	Rushing	Gabriel Abel	19 carries, 120 yards, TD
St. Thomas (MN)	Receiving	Quentin Cobb-Butler	4 receptions, 108 yards, TD

=== No. 14 Idaho State ===
No. 14 Idaho State Bengals (3–0) at Southern Utah Thunderbirds (1–3) – Game summary

Quarter	1	2	3	4	Total
No. 14 Bengals	0	0	0	0	0
Thunderbirds	0	0	0	0	0

at Eccles Coliseum • Cedar City, Utah

- Date: September 26
- Game time: 6:00 p.m.

Game information

First quarter
Second quarter
Third quarter
Fourth quarter

Statistics	IDST	SUU
First downs		
Plays–yards		
Rushes–yards		
Passing yards		
Passing: comp–att–int		
Turnovers		
Time of possession		

Team	Category	Player	Statistics
Idaho State	Passing		
Idaho State	Rushing		
Idaho State	Receiving		
Southern Utah	Passing		
Southern Utah	Rushing		
Southern Utah	Receiving		

=== at Utah Tech ===
Southern Utah Thunderbirds (1–4) at Utah Tech Trailblazers (0–5) – Game summary

Quarter	1	2	3	4	Total
Thunderbirds	0	0	0	0	0
Trailblazers	0	0	0	0	0

at Greater Zion Stadium • St. George, Utah

- Date: October 3
- Game time: 6:00 p.m.

Game information

First quarter
Second quarter
Third quarter
Fourth quarter

Statistics	SUU	UTU
First downs		
Plays–yards		
Rushes–yards		
Passing yards		
Passing: comp–att–int		
Turnovers		
Time of possession		

Team	Category	Player	Statistics
Southern Utah	Passing		
Southern Utah	Rushing		
Southern Utah	Receiving		
Utah Tech	Passing		
Utah Tech	Rushing		
Utah Tech	Receiving		

=== No. 14 UC Davis ===
No. 14 UC Davis Aggies (4–2) at Southern Utah Thunderbirds (2–4) – Game summary

Quarter	1	2	3	4	Total
No. 14 Aggies	0	0	0	0	0
Thunderbirds	0	0	0	0	0

at Eccles Coliseum • Cedar City, Utah

- Date: October 17
- Game time: 6:00 p.m.

Game information

First quarter
Second quarter
Third quarter
Fourth quarter

Statistics	UCD	SUU
First downs		
Plays–yards		
Rushes–yards		
Passing yards		
Passing: comp–att–int		
Turnovers		
Time of possession		

Team	Category	Player	Statistics
UC Davis	Passing		
UC Davis	Rushing		
UC Davis	Receiving		
Southern Utah	Passing		
Southern Utah	Rushing		
Southern Utah	Receiving		

=== at Idaho ===
Southern Utah Thunderbirds (3–4) at Idaho Vandals (2–5) – Game summary

Quarter	1	2	3	4	Total
Thunderbirds	0	10	8	10	28
Vandals	3	15	3	10	31

at Kibbie Dome • Moscow, Idaho

- Date: October 24
- Game time: 3:00 p.m.
- Game weather: Indoor
- Game attendance: 10,369
- Referee: Mike Bezner
- TV announcers (ESPN+): Greg Talbott (play-by-play) and Adam Shackleford (analyst)

Game information

First quarter

- IDHO – Owen Forsman 35-yard field goal, 8:56. Idaho 3–0. Drive: 7 plays, 22 yards, 3:18.

Second quarter

- SUU – Floyd Chalk 19-yard run (Jayden Rogers kick), 9:20. Southern Utah 7–3. Drive: 6 plays, 80 yards, 3:16.
- IDHO – Markel Taylor 19-yard pass from Joshua Wood (Owen Forsman kick), 7:27. Idaho 10–7. Drive: 5 plays, 75 yards, 1:53.
- SUU – Jayden Rogers 42-yard field goal, 3:20. Southern Utah 10–10. Drive: 7 plays, 50 yards, 4:07.
- IDHO – Hayden Kincheloe 1-yard run (Gus Donnerberg pass), 1:23. Idaho 18–10. Drive: 6 plays, 75 yards, 1:57.

Third quarter

- SUU – Will Burns 76-yard run (Jack Fairchild pass), 12:04. Southern Utah 18–18. Drive: 5 plays, 86 yards, 2:42.
- IDHO – Owen Forsman 25-yard field goal, 3:09. Idaho 21–18. Drive: 8 plays, 50 yards, 2:20.

Fourth quarter

- IDHO – Gus Donnerberg 14-yard pass from Joshua Wood (Owen Forsman kick), 10:19. Idaho 28–18. Drive: 9 plays, 85 yards, 5:07.
- SUU – Jayden Rogers 32-yard field goal, 4:54. Southern Utah 21–28. Drive: 11 plays, 60 yards, 5:25.
- SUU – Mark Bails Jr. 57-yard pass from Will Burns (Jayden Rogers kick), 0:42. Southern Utah 28–28. Drive: 4 plays, 57 yards, 0:28.
- IDHO – Owen Forsman 53-yard field goal, 0:00. Idaho 31–28. Drive: 6 plays, 40 yards, 0:42.

Statistics	SUU	IDHO
First downs	16	19
Plays–yards	66–450	64–378
Rushes–yards	35–245	39–227
Passing yards	205	151
Passing: comp–att–int	17–31–1	15–25–1
Turnovers	1	2
Time of possession	31:46	28:14

Team	Category	Player	Statistics
Southern Utah	Passing	Will Burns	17/31, 205 yards, TD, INT
Southern Utah	Rushing	Will Burns	18 carries, 187 yards, TD
Southern Utah	Receiving	Mark Bails Jr.	2 receptions, 69 yards, TD
Idaho	Passing	Joshua Wood	15/25, 151 yards, 2 TD, INT
Idaho	Rushing	Damonte Bias	11 carries, 89 yards
Idaho	Receiving	Zack Card	4 receptions, 57 yards

=== No. 7 Northern Arizona (Grand Canyon Trophy Game) ===
No. 7 Northern Arizona Lumberjacks (6–2) at Southern Utah Thunderbirds (3–5) – Game summary

Quarter	1	2	3	4	Total
No. 7 Lumberjacks	0	0	0	0	0
Thunderbirds	0	0	0	0	0

at Eccles Coliseum • Cedar City, Utah

- Date: October 31
- Game time: 1:00 p.m.

Game information

First quarter
Second quarter
Third quarter
Fourth quarter

Statistics	NAU	SUU
First downs		
Plays–yards		
Rushes–yards		
Passing yards		
Passing: comp–att–int		
Turnovers		
Time of possession		

Team	Category	Player	Statistics
Northern Arizona	Passing		
Northern Arizona	Rushing		
Northern Arizona	Receiving		
Southern Utah	Passing		
Southern Utah	Rushing		
Southern Utah	Receiving		

=== Northern Colorado ===
Northern Colorado Bears (3–6) at Southern Utah Thunderbirds (3–6) – Game summary

Quarter	1	2	3	4	Total
Bears	0	0	0	0	0
Thunderbirds	0	0	0	0	0

at Eccles Coliseum • Cedar City, Utah

- Date: November 7
- Game time: 1:00 p.m.

Game information

First quarter
Second quarter
Third quarter
Fourth quarter

Statistics	UNCO	SUU
First downs		
Plays–yards		
Rushes–yards		
Passing yards		
Passing: comp–att–int		
Turnovers		
Time of possession		

Team	Category	Player	Statistics
Northern Colorado	Passing		
Northern Colorado	Rushing		
Northern Colorado	Receiving		
Southern Utah	Passing		
Southern Utah	Rushing		
Southern Utah	Receiving		

=== at Portland State ===
Southern Utah Thunderbirds (4–6) at Portland State Vikings (2–8) – Game summary

Quarter	1	2	3	4	Total
Thunderbirds	0	0	0	0	0
Vikings	0	0	0	0	0

at Hillsboro Stadium • Hillsboro, Oregon

- Date: November 13
- Game time: 8:00 p.m.

Game information

First quarter
Second quarter
Third quarter
Fourth quarter

Statistics	SUU	PRST
First downs		
Plays–yards		
Rushes–yards		
Passing yards		
Passing: comp–att–int		
Turnovers		
Time of possession		

Team	Category	Player	Statistics
Southern Utah	Passing		
Southern Utah	Rushing		
Southern Utah	Receiving		
Portland State	Passing		
Portland State	Rushing		
Portland State	Receiving		

=== Chicago State ===
Chicago State Cougars (3–7) at Southern Utah Thunderbirds (5–6) – Game summary

Quarter	1	2	3	4	Total
Cougars	0	0	0	0	0
Thunderbirds	0	0	0	0	0

at Eccles Coliseum • Cedar City, Utah

- Date: November 21
- Game time: 12:00 p.m.

Game information

First quarter
Second quarter
Third quarter
Fourth quarter

Statistics	CHST	SUU
First downs		
Plays–yards		
Rushes–yards		
Passing yards		
Passing: comp–att–int		
Turnovers		
Time of possession		

Team	Category	Player	Statistics
Chicago State	Passing		
Chicago State	Rushing		
Chicago State	Receiving		
Southern Utah	Passing		
Southern Utah	Rushing		
Southern Utah	Receiving		
