= 2026 Oregon Ducks football team =

American college football season

2026 Oregon Ducks football
- Conference: Big Ten Conference

Ranking
- Coaches: No. 14
- AP: No. 14
- CFP: No. 13
- Record: 8–3 (6–2 Big Ten)
- Head coach: Dan Lanning (5th season)
- Offensive coordinator: Drew Mehringer (5th season; first 7 games); Jay Johnson (interim; remainder of season)
- Offensive scheme: Pro spread
- Defensive coordinator: Chris Hampton (4th season)
- Base defense: Multiple
- Home stadium: Autzen Stadium

Uniform

2026 Big Ten Conference football standings
	Conf.			Overall
Team	W		L	W		L
No. 4 UCLA	7	–	1	10	–	1
No. 8 Indiana	6	–	2	9	–	2
No. 15 Iowa	6	–	2	9	–	2
No. 13 Oregon	6	–	2	8	–	3
No. 18 USC	5	–	3	8	–	3
No. 14 Ohio State	5	–	3	7	–	4
Wisconsin	5	–	3	7	–	4
Nebraska	4	–	4	7	–	4
Washington	4	–	4	7	–	4
Illinois	4	–	4	6	–	5
Minnesota	4	–	4	6	–	5
Michigan	3	–	5	6	–	5
Northwestern	3	–	5	6	–	5
Penn State	3	–	5	6	–	5
Maryland	2	–	6	4	–	7
Purdue	2	–	6	3	–	8
Rutgers	2	–	6	3	–	8
Michigan State	1	–	7	3	–	8
Championship: December 5, 2026
^ – College Football Playoff participant; $ – Conference champion; y – Championship game participant; As of November 22, 2026; Rankings from CFP rankings

The 2026 Oregon Ducks football team represents the University of Oregon as a member of the Big Ten Conference during the 2026 NCAA Division I FBS football season. The team is led by fifth-year head coach Dan Lanning, and plays home games at Autzen Stadium in Eugene, Oregon. This is the Ducks' third year in the Big Ten.

== Schedule ==
Date	Time	Opponent	Rank	Site	TV	Result	Attendance
September 5	12:30 p.m.	Boise State*	No. 2	Autzen Stadium; Eugene, OR	CBS	W 34–27	57,652
September 12	9:00 a.m.	at Oklahoma State*	No. 6	Boone Pickens Stadium; Stillwater, OK	ESPN	L 31–39	51,035
September 18	7:30 p.m.	Portland State*	No. 21	Autzen Stadium; Eugene, OR	BTN	W 84–0	58,114
September 26	4:30 p.m.	at No. 12 USC	No. 20	Los Angeles Memorial Coliseum; Los Angeles, CA (rivalry)	NBC	W 41–27	75,500
October 10	12:30 p.m.	No. 21 UCLA	No. 13	Autzen Stadium; Eugene, OR	CBS	L 15–17	59,262
October 17	8:00 p.m.	Nebraska		Autzen Stadium; Eugene, OR	FOX	W 17–14	58,391
October 24	12:00 p.m.	at Illinois		Gies Memorial Stadium; Champaign, IL	BTN	L 10–21	58,723
October 31	12:30 p.m.	No. 20т Northwestern^{†}		Autzen Stadium; Eugene, OR	NBCSN/Peacock	W 34–26	55,673
November 7	12:30 p.m.	at No. 12 Ohio State	No. 23	Ohio Stadium; Columbus, OH	CBS	W 41–28	103,551
November 14	12:30 p.m.	Michigan	No. 16	Autzen Stadium; Eugene, OR	FOX/FS1	W 31–7	58,183
November 20	5:00 p.m.	at Michigan State	No. 13	Spartan Stadium; East Lansing, MI	FOX	W 45–7	61,331
November 28	4:00 p.m./4:30 p.m.	Washington		Autzen Stadium; Eugene, OR (rivalry)	NBC		
*Non-conference game; ^{†}Homecoming; Rankings from AP Poll (and CFP Rankings, after November 3) – Released prior to game; All times are in Pacific time; Source:

== Game summaries ==
=== vs Boise State ===
Boise State Broncos (0–0) at No. 2 Oregon Ducks (0–0) – Game summary

Quarter	1	2	3	4	Total
Broncos	7	10	7	3	27
No. 2 Ducks	0	14	10	10	34

at Autzen Stadium • Eugene, Oregon

- Date: September 5
- Game time: 12:30 p.m. PST
- Game weather: Sunny
- Game attendance: 57,652
- Referee: Jeff Servinski
- TV announcers (CBS): Brad Nessler (play-by-play), Charles Davis (analyst), and Jenny Dell (sideline reporter)

Game information

First quarter

- BOIS – Cam Bates 13-yard pass from Maddux Madsen (Canaan Moore kick), 8:37. Broncos 7–0. Drive: 11 plays, 75 yards, 6:23.

Second quarter

- ORE – Jordon Davison 1-yard run (Gage Hurych kick), 11:17. Tied 7–7. Drive: 8 plays, 50 yards, 3:37.
- BOIS – Sire Gaines 38-yard pass from Maddux Madsen (Canaan Moore kick), 10:14. Broncos 14–7. Drive: 1 play, 38 yards, 0:10.
- BOIS – Canaan Moore 29-yard field goal, 2:48. Broncos 17–7. Drive: 9 plays, 42 yards, 4:42.
- ORE – Jamari Johnson 27-yard pass from Dante Moore (Gage Hurych kick), 0:19. Broncos 17–14. Drive: 4 plays, 44 yards, 0:43.

Third quarter

- ORE – Gage Hurych 26-yard field goal, 11:30. Tied 17–17. Drive: 8 plays, 67 yards, 3:30.
- ORE – Jeremiah McClellan 8-yard pass from Dante Moore (Gage Hurych kick), 5:36. Ducks 24–17. Drive: 6 plays, 87 yards, 3:13.
- BOIS – Matt Wagner 7-yard pass from Maddux Madsen (Canaan Moore kick), 1:20. Tied 24–24. Drive: 8 plays, 75 yards, 4:16.

Fourth quarter

- ORE – Gage Hurych 44-yard field goal, 14:49. Ducks 27–24. Drive: 5 plays, 50 yards, 1:31.
- BOIS – Canaan Moore 36-yard field goal, 8:45. Tied 27–27. Drive: 11 plays, 57 yards, 6:04.
- ORE – Dakorien Moore 62-yard pass from Dante Moore (Gage Hurych kick), 7:51. Ducks 34–27. Drive: 2 plays, 71 yards, 0:54.

Statistics	BOIS	ORE
First downs	18	18
Plays–yards	65–274	63–497
Rushes–yards	36–93	25–119
Passing yards	181	378
Passing: Comp–Att–Int	15–29–0	28–38–0
Turnovers	0	1
Time of possession	31:54	28:06

Team	Category	Player	Statistics
Boise State	Passing	Maddux Madsen	15/29, 181 yards, 3 TD
Boise State	Rushing	Dylan Riley	17 carries, 50 yards
Boise State	Receiving	Rasean Jones	4 receptions, 76 yards
Oregon	Passing	Dante Moore	28/37, 378 yards, 3 TD
Oregon	Rushing	Jordon Davison	12 carries, 90 yards, TD
Oregon	Receiving	Jeremiah McClellan	6 receptions, 150 yards, TD

=== at Oklahoma State ===
No. 6 Oregon Ducks (1–0) at Oklahoma State Cowboys (0–1) – Game summary

Quarter	1	2	3	4	Total
No. 6 Ducks	7	10	7	7	31
Cowboys	3	21	6	9	39

at Boone Pickens Stadium • Stillwater, Oklahoma

- Date: September 12
- Game time: 9:00 a.m. PST
- Game weather: Sunny • Temperature: 89 °F (32 °C) • Wind: NE at 12 miles per hour (19 km/h)
- Game attendance: 51,035
- Referee: Francisco Villar
- TV announcers (ESPN): Dave Pasch (play-by-play), Dusty Dvoracek (analyst), and Taylor McGregor (sideline reporter)

Game information

First quarter

- OKST – Sam Keltner 20-yard field goal, 10:51. Cowboys 3–0. Drive: 5 plays, 76 yards, 2:50.
- ORE – Devon Jackson 96-yard interception return (Gage Hurych kick), 9:32. Ducks 7–3.

Second quarter

- OKST − Carson Kolb 1-yard pass from Drew Mestemaker (Sam Keltner kick), 12:54. Cowboys 10–7. Drive: 5 plays, 47 yards, 2:20.
- OKST − Caleb Hawkins 5-yard run (Sam Keltner kick), 8:35. Cowboys 17–7. Drive: 8 plays, 65 yards, 2:31.
- ORE − Jordon Davison 1-yard run (Gage Hurych kick), 5:26. Cowboys 17–14. Drive: 1 play, 1 yard, 0:04.
- OKST − Wyatt Young 52-yard pass from Drew Mestemaker (Sam Keltner kick), 3:47. Cowboys 24–14. Drive: 4 plays, 75 yards, 1:39.
- ORE − Gage Hurych 42-yard field goal, 0:30. Cowboys 24–17. Drive: 11 plays, 41 yards, 3:17.

Third quarter

- OKST − Sam Keltner 24-yard field goal, 11:50. Cowboys 27–17. Drive: 10 plays, 69 yards, 3:10.
- ORE − Dakorien Moore 36-yard pass from Dante Moore (Gage Hurych kick), 9:12. Cowboys 27–24. Drive: 6 plays, 75 yards, 2:38.
- OKST − Sam Keltner 44-yard field goal, 0:31. Cowboys 30–24. Drive: 11 plays, 26 yards, 4:06.

Fourth quarter

- ORE − Evan Stewart 38-yard pass from Dante Moore (Gage Hurych kick), 14:51. Ducks 31–30. Drive: 3 plays, 35 yards, 0:40.
- OKST − Drew Mestemaker 10-yard run (run failed), 10:21. Cowboys 36–31. Drive: 13 plays, 75 yards, 4:30.
- OKST − Sam Keltner 31-yard field goal, 3:11. Cowboys 39–31. Drive: 6 plays, 20 yards, 3:37.

Statistics	ORE	OKST
First downs	12	25
Plays–yards	59–281	83–554
Rushes–yards	30-90	40-237
Passing yards	191	317
Passing: Comp–Att–Int	14–29–0	26–43–2
Turnovers	1	2
Time of possession	23:06	36:54

Team	Category	Player	Statistics
Oregon	Passing	Dante Moore	14/29, 191 yards, 2 TD
Oregon	Rushing	Dierre Hill	15 carries, 74 yards
Oregon	Receiving	Evan Stewart	4 receptions, 78 yards, TD
Oklahoma State	Passing	Drew Mestemaker	26/43, 317 yards, 2 TD, 2 INT
Oklahoma State	Rushing	Caleb Hawkins	23 carries, 110 yards, TD
Oklahoma State	Receiving	Wyatt Young	5 receptions, 121 yards, TD

=== vs Portland State ===
Portland State Vikings (0–3) at No. 21 Oregon Ducks (1–1) – Game summary

Quarter	1	2	3	4	Total
Vikings	0	0	0	0	0
No. 21 Ducks	28	21	14	21	84

at Autzen Stadium • Eugene, Oregon

- Date: September 18
- Game time: 7:30 p.m. PST
- Game weather: Sunny • Temperature: 68 °F (20 °C) • Wind: N at 6 miles per hour (9.7 km/h)
- Game attendance: 58,114
- Referee: Jeremy Valentine
- TV announcers (BTN): Mark Followill (play-by-play), Rhett Lewis (analyst), and Kenjon Barner (sideline reporter)

Game information

First quarter

- ORE – Jordon Davison 3-yard run (Gage Hurych kick), 11:45. Ducks 7–0. Drive: 8 plays, 72 yards, 3:12.
- ORE – Dakorien Moore 45-yard pass from Dante Moore (Gage Hurych kick), 9:14. Ducks 14–0. Drive: 2 plays, 67 yards, 0:49.
- ORE – Jordon Davison 5-yard run (Gage Hurych kick), 6:58. Ducks 21–0. Drive: 4 plays, 19 yards, 2:09.
- ORE – Evan Stewart 39-yard pass from Dante Moore (Gage Hurych kick), 4:59. Ducks 28–0. Drive: 2 plays, 57 yards, 0:24.

Second quarter

- ORE – Kendre Harrison 10-yard pass from Dante Moore (Gage Hurych kick), 13:33. Ducks 35–0. Drive: 9 plays, 83 yards, 4:04.
- ORE – Dierre Hill Jr. 7-yard run (Rocco Graziano kick), 5:23. Ducks 42–0. Drive: 12 plays, 80 yards, 6:13.
- ORE – Messiah Hampton 7-yard pass from Dante Moore (Gage Hurych kick), 1:45. Ducks 49–0. Drive: 6 plays, 37 yards, 1:59.

Third quarter

- ORE – Andrew Olesh 13-yard pass from Dylan Raiola (Rocco Graziano kick), 9:27. Ducks 56–0. Drive: 9 plays, 80 yards, 4:15.
- ORE – Messiah Hampton 17-yard pass from Dylan Raiola (Rocco Graziano kick), 4:08. Ducks 63–0. Drive: 4 plays, 57 yards, 1:28.

Fourth quarter

- ORE – Brady Bidwell 7-yard pass from Dylan Raiola (Rocco Graziano kick), 14:55. Ducks 70–0. Drive: 9 plays, 38 yards, 4:08.
- ORE – Tradarian Ball 6-yard run (Rocco Graziano kick), 8:08. Ducks 77–0. Drive: 12 plays, 78 yards, 4:30.
- ORE – Brandon Smith 2-yard run (Rocco Graziano kick), 0:29. Ducks 84–0. Drive: 14 plays, 79 yards, 5:16.

Statistics	PRST	ORE
First downs	5	43
Plays–yards	37–103	94–740
Rushes–yards	17–2	51–289
Passing yards	101	451
Passing: Comp–Att–Int	8–20–3	35–43–0
Turnovers	4	0
Time of possession	18:42	41:18

Team	Category	Player	Statistics
Portland State	Passing	Gabe Downing	8/20, 101 yards, 3 INT
Portland State	Rushing	Delon Thompson	9 carries, 12 yards
Portland State	Receiving	Terence Loville	2 receptions, 50 yards
Oregon	Passing	Dante Moore	19/23, 280 yards, 4 TD
Oregon	Rushing	Brandon Smith	16 carries, 85 yards, TD
Oregon	Receiving	Evan Stewart	3 receptions, 72 yards, TD

=== at No. 12 USC (rivalry) ===
No. 20 Oregon Ducks (2–1) at No. 12 USC Trojans (4–0) – Game summary

Quarter	1	2	3	4	Total
No. 20 Ducks	3	10	14	14	41
No. 12 Trojans	0	10	10	7	27

at Los Angeles Memorial Coliseum • Los Angeles, California

- Date: September 26
- Game time: 4:30 p.m. PST
- Game weather: Sunny • Temperature: 88 °F (31 °C) • Wind: SW at 7 miles per hour (11 km/h)
- Game attendance: 75,500
- Referee: Bryan Banks
- TV announcers (NBC): Noah Eagle (play-by-play), Todd Blackledge (analyst), and Kathryn Tappen (sideline reporter)

Game information

First quarter

- ORE – Gage Hurych 30-yard field goal, 3:34. Ducks 3–0. Drive: 10 plays, 68 yards, 5:31.

Second quarter

- USC – Kayden Dixon-Wyatt 31-yard pass from Jayden Maiava (Chaden Chittenden kick), 12:53. Trojans 7–3. Drive: 4 plays, 58 yards, 1:15.
- ORE – Evan Stewart 3-yard pass from Dylan Raiola (Gage Hurych kick), 9:05. Ducks 10–7. Drive: 9 plays, 75 yards, 3:49.
- USC – Chaden Chittenden 38-yard field goal, 5:32. Tied 10–10. Drive: 8 plays, 44 yards, 3:32.
- ORE – Gage Hurych 19-yard field goal, 0:01. Ducks 13–10. Drive: 16 plays, 76 yards, 5:26.

Third quarter

- ORE – Dierre Hill Jr. 1-yard run (Gage Hurych kick), 13:04. Ducks 20–10. Drive: 4 plays, 75 yards, 1:56.
- USC – Jayden Maiava 1-yard run (Chaden Chittenden kick), 8:33. Ducks 20–17. Drive: 9 plays, 75 yards, 4:31.
- ORE – Dierre Hill Jr. 4-yard run (Gage Hurych kick), 5:52. Ducks 27–17. Drive: 7 plays, 75 yards, 2:41.
- USC – Chaden Chittenden 29-yard field goal, 1:32. Ducks 27–20. Drive: 10 plays, 63 yards, 4:20.

Fourth quarter

- USC – Tanook Hines 11-yard pass from Jayden Maiava (Chade Chittenden kick), 12:41. Tied 27–27. Drive: 7 plays, 75 yards, 2:28.
- ORE – Dakorien Moore 29-yard pass from Dylan Raiola (Gage Hurych kick), 8:35. Ducks 34–27. Drive: 9 plays, 75 yards, 4:06.
- ORE – Jordan Davison 2-yard run (Gage Hurych kick), 2:03. Ducks 41–27. Drive: 8 plays, 49 yards, 5:12.

Statistics	ORE	USC
First downs	23	26
Plays–yards	68–504	75–446
Rushes–yards	33–138	33–120
Passing yards	366	326
Passing: Comp–Att–Int	27–35–0	23–42–1
Turnovers	0	1
Time of possession	31:25	28:35

Team	Category	Player	Statistics
Oregon	Passing	Dylan Raiola	19/25, 289 yards, 2 TD
Oregon	Rushing	Jordon Davison	16 carries, 66 yards, TD
Oregon	Receiving	Jamari Johnson	7 receptions, 119 yards
USC	Passing	Jayden Maiava	23/43, 326 yards, 2 TD, 1 INT
USC	Rushing	King Miller	13 carries, 74 yards
USC	Receiving	Kayden Dixon-Wyatt	7 receptions, 114 yards, TD

=== vs No. 21 UCLA ===
No. 21 UCLA Bruins (4–0) at No. 13 Oregon Ducks (3–1) – Game summary

Quarter	1	2	3	4	Total
No. 21 Bruins	3	7	0	7	17
No. 13 Ducks	6	0	0	9	15

at Autzen Stadium • Eugene, Oregon

- Date: October 10
- Game time: 12:30 p.m. PST
- Game weather: Sunny • Temperature: 56 °F (13 °C) • Wind: E at 2 miles per hour (3.2 km/h)
- Game attendance: 59,262
- Referee: Chris Coyte
- TV announcers (CBS): Brad Nessler (play-by-play), Charles Davis (analyst), and Jenny Dell (sideline reporter)

Game information

First quarter

- UCLA – Mateen Bhaghani 21-yard field goal, 10:47. Bruins 3–0. Drive: 8 plays, 73 yards, 4:13.
- ORE – Jordon Davison 1-yard run (run failed), 7:57. Ducks 6–3. Drive: 1 plays, 1 yards, 0:04.

Second quarter

- UCLA – Wayne Knight 35-yard run (Mateen Bhaghani kick), 8:08. Bruins 10–6. Drive: 4 plays, 51 yards, 2:17.

Third quarter

- No scoring plays.

Fourth quarter

- UCLA – Wayne Knight 9-yard pass from Ty Dieffenbach (Mateen Bhaghani kick), 13:31. Bruins 17–6. Drive: 6 plays, 33 yards, 2:55.
- ORE – Gage Hurych 26-yard field goal, 5:16. Bruins 17–9. Drive: 8 plays, 60 yards, 3:23.
- ORE – Evan Stewart 44-yard pass from Brock Thomas (run failed), 2:16. Bruins 17–15. Drive: 4 plays, 57 yards, 0:50.

Statistics	UCLA	ORE
First downs	17	12
Plays–yards	70–345	62–272
Rushes–yards	47–140	27–73
Passing yards	205	199
Passing: Comp–Att–Int	13–23–2	17–35–2
Time of possession	39:15	20:45

Team	Category	Player	Statistics
UCLA	Passing	Nico Iamaleava	10/17, 162 yards, 2 INT
UCLA	Rushing	Wayne Knight	22 carries, 103 yards, TD
UCLA	Receiving	Aidan Mizell	1 reception, 62 yards
Oregon	Passing	Brock Thomas	11/15, 156 yards, TD
Oregon	Rushing	Dierre Hill	10 carries, 44 yards
Oregon	Receiving	Dakorien Moore	4 receptions, 77 yards

=== vs Nebraska ===
Nebraska Cornhuskers (5–1) at Oregon Ducks (3–2) – Game summary

Quarter	1	2	3	4	Total
Cornhuskers	0	7	7	0	14
Ducks	0	0	6	11	17

at Autzen Stadium • Eugene, Oregon

- Date: October 17
- Game time: 8:00 p.m. PST
- Game weather: Clear, 57 degrees, Wind N @ 9 mph
- Game attendance: 58,391
- Referee: Jason Nickleby
- TV announcers (FOX): Tim Brando (play-by-play), Devin Gardner (analyst), and Josh Sims (sideline reporter)

Game information

First Quarter

(No Scoring)

Second Quarter

- (0:04) NEB – Kwazi Gilmer 17-yard pass from Anthony Colandrea (Kyle Cunanan kick) (Drive: 10 plays, 65 yards, 01:42, Nebraska 7–0)

Third Quarter

- (12:09) ORE - Gage Hurych 36-yard field goal (Drive: 4 plays, 1 yard, 1:20, Nebraska 7-3)
- (7:16) ORE - Gage Hurych 36-yard field goal (Drive: 8 plays, 39 yards, 3:45, Nebraska 7-6)
- (0:07) NEB - Anthony Colandrea 6-yard rush (Kyle Cunanan kick) (Drive: 6 plays, 52 yards, 4:06, Nebraska 14-6)

Fourth Quarter

- (7:18) ORE – Gage Hurych 37-yard field goal (Drive: 17 plays, 69 yards, 7:42, Nebraska 14-9)
- (0:28) ORE - Jamari Johnson 4-yard pass from Dylan Raiola (Hudson Lewis 2-pt PAT pass from Dylan Raiola) (Drive: 20 plays, 82 yards, 5:03, Oregon 17-14)

Statistics	NEB	ORE
First downs	14	15
Plays–yards	67–242	76–242
Rushes–yards	33–78	38–129
Passing yards	164	113
Passing: Comp–Att–Int	18–34–1	20–38–1
Time of possession	29:37	30:23

Team	Category	Player	Statistics
Nebraska	Passing	Anthony Colandrea	18/33, 164 yards, TD, INT
Nebraska	Rushing	Anthony Colandrea	13 carries, 38 yards, TD
Nebraska	Receiving	Kwazi Gilmer	6 receptions, 74 yards, TD
Oregon	Passing	Dylan Raiola	11/18, 59 yards, TD
Oregon	Rushing	Dierre Hill Jr	14 carries, 67 yards
Oregon	Receiving	Dakorien Moore	7 receptions, 36 yards

=== at Illinois ===
Oregon Ducks (4–2) at Illinois Fighting Illini (3–3) – Game summary

Quarter	1	2	3	4	Total
Ducks	7	3	0	0	10
Fighting Illini	0	7	7	7	21

at Gies Memorial Stadium • Champaign, Illinois

- Date: October 24
- TV announcers (BTN): Chris Vosters (play-by-play), Jake Butt (analyst), and Brooke Fletcher (sideline reporter)

Statistics	ORE	ILL
First downs		
Plays–yards		
Rushes–yards		
Passing yards		
Passing: Comp–Att–Int		
Time of possession		

Team	Category	Player	Statistics
Oregon	Passing		
Oregon	Rushing		
Oregon	Receiving		
Illinois	Passing		
Illinois	Rushing		
Illinois	Receiving		

=== vs No. 20т Northwestern ===
No. 20т Northwestern Wildcats (6–1) at Oregon Ducks (4–3) – Game summary

Quarter	1	2	3	4	Total
No. 20т Wildcats	10	10	3	3	26
Ducks	3	10	7	14	34

at Autzen Stadium • Eugene, Oregon

- Date: October 31
- TV announcers (Peacock/NBCSN): Paul Burmeister (play-by-play), Yogi Roth (analyst) and Caroline Pineda (sideline)

Game information

First quarter
Second quarter
Third quarter
Fourth quarter

Statistics	NU	ORE
First downs		
Total yards		
Rushes–yards		
Passing yards		
Passing: Comp–Att–Int		
Time of possession		

Team	Category	Player	Statistics
Northwestern	Passing		
Northwestern	Rushing		
Northwestern	Receiving		
Oregon	Passing		
Oregon	Rushing		
Oregon	Receiving		

=== at No. 12 Ohio State ===
No. 23 Oregon Ducks (5–3) at No. 12 Ohio State Buckeyes (6–2) – Game summary

Quarter	1	2	3	4	Total
No. 23 Ducks	0	17	14	10	41
No. 12 Buckeyes	14	0	0	14	28

at Ohio Stadium • Columbus, Ohio

- Date: November 7
- TV announcers (CBS): Brad Nessler (play-by-play), Charles Davis (analyst), and Jenny Dell (sideline reporter)

Statistics	ORE	OSU
First downs		
Plays–yards		
Rushes–yards		
Passing yards		
Passing: Comp–Att–Int		
Time of possession		

Team	Category	Player	Statistics
Oregon	Passing		
Oregon	Rushing		
Oregon	Receiving		
Ohio State	Passing		
Ohio State	Rushing		
Ohio State	Receiving		

=== vs Michigan ===
Michigan Wolverines (5–4) at No. 16 Oregon Ducks (6–3) – Game summary

Quarter	1	2	3	4	Total
Wolverines	0	7	0	0	7
No. 16 Ducks	14	7	0	10	31

at Autzen Stadium • Eugene, Oregon

- Date: November 14
- Game time: 12:30 p.m.
- Game weather: Cloudy • Temperature: 60 °F (16 °C) • Wind: SW 6 miles per hour (9.7 km/h)
- Game attendance: 58,183
- Referee: Gregory Blum
- TV announcers (FS1/FOX): Tim Brando (play-by-play), Devin Gardner (analyst), and Josh Sims (sideline reporter)

Game information

First quarter
Second quarter
Third quarter
Fourth quarter

Statistics	MICH	ORE
First downs		
Total yards		
Rushes–yards		
Passing yards		
Passing: Comp–Att–Int		
Time of possession		

Team	Category	Player	Statistics
Michigan	Passing		
Michigan	Rushing		
Michigan	Receiving		
Oregon	Passing		
Oregon	Rushing		
Oregon	Receiving		

=== at Michigan State ===
No. 13 Oregon Ducks (7–3) at Michigan State Spartans (3–7) – Game summary

Quarter	1	2	3	4	Total
No. 13 Ducks	7	10	14	14	45
Spartans	0	0	7	0	7

at Spartan Stadium • East Lansing, Michigan

- Date: November 20
- Game time: 5:00 p.m. PST
- Game attendance: 61,331
- Referee: Francisco Villar
- TV announcers (FOX): Tim Brando (play-by-play), Devin Gardner (analyst), and Josh Sims (sideline reporter)

Statistics	ORE	MSU
First downs	24	13
Plays–yards	72–422	60–200
Rushes–yards	38–188	37–80
Passing yards	234	120
Passing: Comp–Att–Int	21–34–0	12–23–1
Time of possession	28:09	31:51

Team	Category	Player	Statistics
Oregon	Passing	Dylan Raiola	21/34, 234 yards, TD
Oregon	Rushing	Brandon Smith	14 carries, 121 yards, 2 TD
Oregon	Receiving	Dakorien Moore	5 receptions, 55 yards, TD
Michigan State	Passing	Kayd Coffman	10/19, 106 yards, INT
Michigan State	Rushing	Jaziun Patterson	16 carries, 26 yards, TD
Michigan State	Receiving	Fredrick Moore	2 receptions, 31 yards

=== vs Washington ===
Washington Huskies (0–0) at Oregon Ducks (0–0) – Game summary

Quarter	1	2	Total
Huskies			0
Ducks			0

at Autzen Stadium • Eugene, Oregon

- Date: November 28

Game information

First quarter
Second quarter
Third quarter
Fourth quarter

Statistics	WASH	ORE
First downs		
Total yards		
Rushes–yards		
Passing yards		
Passing: Comp–Att–Int		
Time of possession		

Team	Category	Player	Statistics
Washington	Passing		
Washington	Rushing		
Washington	Receiving		
Oregon	Passing		
Oregon	Rushing		
Oregon	Receiving		

== Personnel ==
=== Roster ===
2026 Oregon Ducks football team roster
Players
Coaches
Offense

Pos.	#	Name	Class
RB	0	Jordon Davison	So
WR	1	Dakorien Moore	So
WR	2	Iverson Hooks	Jr
WR	3	Jeremiah McClellan	So
RB	4	Tradarian Ball	Fr
QB	5	Dante Moore	Jr
RB	6	Dierre Hill	So
WR	7	Evan Stewart	Sr
QB	8	Dylan Raiola	Jr
TE	9	Jamari Johnson	Jr
WR	10	Jalen Lott	Fr
QB	11	Akili Smith Jr.	So
QB	12	Brock Thomas	Jr
WR	13	Gatlin Bair	Fr
QB	14	Ryder Hayes	So
WR	15	Messiah Hampton	Fr
QB	16	TC Manumaleuna	Fr
TE	17	Markus Dixon	Jr
TE	18	Kendre Harrison	Fr
TE	19	Andrew Olesh	So
RB	21	Da'Jaun Riggs	So
RB	22	Simeon Price	5th
WR	24	Hunter Vaughn	Fr
RB	26	Brandon Smith	Fr
RB	27	Killian Sombe	Fr
WR	30	Aaron Bidwell	So
RB	40	Zander Quinn	Sr
OL	50	Demetri Manning	So
OL	53	Devin Brooks	So
OL	54	Aiden Lewey	Fr
OL	55	Douglas Utu	So
OL	56	Trent Ferguson	So
OL	57	Zac Stascausky	So
OL	58	Ziyare Addison	So
OL	59	Fox Crader	So
OL	65	Solomon Kroeker	Fr
OL	66	Bryce Boulton	Jr
OL	67	Beau CressAllen	Jr
OL	68	Auston Mims	Jr
OL	70	Koloi Keli	Fr
OL	72	Iapani Laloulu	Sr
OL	73	Kawika Rogers	Sr
OL	74	Dave Iuli	Sr
OL	75	Michael Bennett III	5th
OL	77	Tommy Tofi	Fr
OL	78	Gernorris Wilson	Jr
OL	79	Immanuel Iheanacho	Fr
WR	80	Dillon Gresham	So
TE	81	Dayton Raiola	Fr
WR	82	Nathan McCoy II	So
WR	83	Hudson Lewis	Fr
WR	84	Jovon McRae II	So
TE	85	Cole Newton	Fr
TE	87	A. J. Pugliano	So
WR	88	Jack Ressler	So
WR	89	Brady Bidwell	So

Defense

Pos.	#	Name	Class
DL	0	D'Antre Robinson	So
DL	1	Bear Alexander	Sr
DB	2	Na'eem Offord	So
DB	3	Koi Perich	Jr
DB	4	Brandon Finney Jr.	So
DB	5	Davon Benjamin	Fr
ILB	6	Jerry Mixon	Sr
DB	7	Ify Obidegwu	So
DB	8	Trey McNutt	So
ILB	9	Devon Jackson	Sr
OLB	10	Matayo Uiagalelei	Sr
ILB	11	Dylan Williams	So
DB	12	Peyton Woodyard	Jr
ILB	13	Gavin Nix	So
DB	14	Aaron Scott Jr.	Jr
DB	15	Carl Williams IV	Sr
DB	16	Azel Banag	Fr
DB	17	Tre Watson	Jr
DB	18	Dorian Brew	So
ILB	19	Braylon Hodge	Fr
DB	20	Xavier Lherisse	Fr
DB	21	Aaron Flowers	So
DB	22	Devin Jackson	Fr
ILB	23	Brayden Platt	So
DB	24	Jett Washington	Fr
ILB	25	Tristan Phillips	Fr
OLB	27	Bleu Dantzler	So
DL	28	Anthony Jones Jr.	Fr
DB	29	Arlo Henderson Jr.	Jr
DB	30	Xavier Barksdale	Jr
OLB	31	Nasir Wyatt	So
DL	32	Tony Cumberland	Fr
DB	33	Zach Grisham	So
DB	34	Cruz Rushing	Sr
OLB	35	Brody Thomas	So
DB	37	Braxton Singleton	Fr
ILB	38	Will Straton	Jr
ILB	39	Cole Thomas	Fr
OLB	41	Dutch Horisk	Fr
DL	42	Aydin Breland	So
OLB	44	Teitum Tuioti	Sr
OLB	45	Hudson Coe	Fr
DL	47	Elijah Rushing	So
OLB	51	Prince Tavizon	Fr
DL	52	A'Mauri Washington	Sr
DE	55	Matthew Johnson	So
DL	90	Anthony Jones	Fr
DL	91	Derrick Brown Jr.	Sr
DL	99	Jerome Simmons	Sr

Special teams

Pos.	#	Name	Class
K	25	Rocco Graziano	So
K	35	Keaton Emmett	Jr
P	36	Michael Sbuttoni	Fr
P	39	Bailey Ettridge	So
P	49	Jack Nicoli	Fr
LS	64	Thomas Donkerbrook	Fr
LS	71	RJ Todd	Sr
K	97	Gage Hurych	So

Head coach

- Dan Lanning

Coordinators/assistant coaches

- Chris Hampton – Defensive coordinator/safeties
- Jay Johnson – Offensive coordinator
- Ra'Shaad Samples – Assistant head coach/running backs
- Joe Lorig – Special teams coordinator
- Kamran Araghi – Edge
- Ross Douglas – Wide receivers/pass game coordinator
- Koa Ka'ai – Quarterbacks
- Brian Michalowski – Inside linebackers
- A'lique Terry – Offensive linemen
- Tony Tuioti – Defensive linemen
- Rashad Wadood – Cornerbacks
- Jack Smith – Tight ends
- Wilson Love – Director, strength and conditioning
- Anthony Kincy – Associate, strength and conditioning
- Kyle Bolton – Director, speed and performance
- Drew Jordan – Assistant, strength and conditioning
- Donte Ellington – Assistant wide receivers
- Ryan Walk – Assistant offensive line
- Adam Barraza – Defensive assistant
- Dante Bartee – Defensive assistant
- Kyle Cogan – Defensive assistant
- Michael Harrison – Defensive assistant
- JR Reed – Defensive assistant
- Rip Rowan – Defensive assistant
- Jaime Silva – Defensive assistant
- Jake Stone – Defensive assistant
- Mike Cavanaugh – Offensive assistant
- Justin Herron – Offensive assistant
- Jaleel Kindell – Offensive assistant
- George Moore – Offensive assistant
- Ryan Switzer – Offensive assistant
- AJ Traynor – Offensive assistant
- Holden Whipple – Offensive assistant
- Dane White – Offensive assistant
- Bailey McElwain – Special teams assistant

Legend

- (C) Team captain
- (S) Suspended
- (I) Ineligible
- Injured
- Redshirt

Roster

=== Departures ===
==== NFL draft ====
Name	Pos.	Team	Round	Pick
Kenyon Sadiq	TE	New York Jets	1	16
Dillon Thieneman	S	Chicago Bears	1	25
Emmanuel Pregnon	G	Jacksonville Jaguars	3	88
Jadon Canady	CB	Kansas City Chiefs	4	109
Bryce Boettcher	LB	Indianapolis Colts	4	135
Malik Benson	WR	Las Vegas Raiders	6	195
Alex Harkey	G	Los Angeles Chargers	6	206

==== Outgoing transfers ====
Name	No.	Pos.	Height	Weight	Year	Hometown	New school
Bryson Beaver		QB	6'2"	200	FR	Murrieta, CA	Georgia
Daylen Austin	0	DB	6'1"	199	SO	Long Beach, CA	Arizona
Kingston Lopa	2	DB	6'5"	210	FR	Sacramento, CA	California
Kyler Kasper	3	WR	6'6"	212	JR	Gilbert, AZ	BYU
Sione Laulea	3	DB	6'4"	196	JR	Mountain View, CA	Missouri
Jahlil Florence	6	DB	6'1"	195	JR	San Diego, CA	Missouri
Blake Purchase	9	LB	6'3"	245	SO	Denver, CO	Ole Miss
Luke Moga	10	QB	6'2"	204	FR	Phoenix, AZ	New Mexico
Dakoda Fields	11	DB	6'2"	200	FR	Compton, CA	Oklahoma
Justius Lowe	14	WR	6'1"	197	JR	Portland, OR	San Diego State
Solomon Davis	15	DB	6'0"	197	SO	Fontana, CA	San Diego State
Austin Novosad	16	QB	6'3"	200	SO	Dripping Springs, TX	Bowling Green
Cooper Perry	17	WR	6'1"	194	FR	Scottsdale, AZ	California
Tobi Haastrup	19	LB	6'4"	241	FR	London, England	West Virginia
Mark Wiepert	19	QB	6'1"	210	FR	Wilsonville, OR	UTSA
Makhi Hughes	20	RB	5'11"	210	JR	Birmingham, AL	Houston
Jay Harris	22	RB	6'2"	224	JR	St. Louis, MO	Kansas State
Jayden Limar	27	RB	5'11"	205	JR	Lake Stevens, WA	Washington
Ashton Porter	29	LB	6'3"	290	SO	Cypress, TX	Houston
Kamar Mothudi	33	LB	6'3"	244	FR	Los Angeles, CA	California
Zach Grace	44	TE	6'3"	238	SO	Kearney, MO	LSU
Tionne Grey	50	DL	6'6"	336	FR	St. Louis, MO	Notre Dame
Jericho Johnson	77	DL	6'4"	342	FR	Suisun City, CA	California
Lipe Moala	79	OL	6'5"	336	SO	Riverside, CA	Hawaii
Vander Ploog	81	TE	6'6"	242	FR	Fullerton, CA	NC State
Roger Saleapaga	83	TE	6'4"	245	SO	Orem, UT	BYU
Kade Caton	85	TE	6'5"	250	FR	Manvel, TX	South Florida
Darrian Anderson	86	WR	5'9"	187	JR	Waipahu, HI	Fresno State
Xadavien Sims	88	DL	6'3"	305	FR	Durant, OK	Arkansas
Nick Duzansky	96	LS	6'5"	197	RS-SO	Glen Ellyn, IL	Michigan State
Terrance Green	99	DL	6'5"	330	SO	Cypress, TX	Alabama

==== Coaching departures ====
Name	Previous Position	New Position
Tosh Lupoi	Oregon - Defensive coordinator / linebackers coach	California - Head coach
Will Stein	Oregon - Offensive coordinator / quarterbacks coach	Kentucky - Head coach

=== Acquisitions ===
==== Incoming transfers ====
Name	No.	Pos.	Height	Weight	Year	Hometown	Prev. school
D'Antre Robinson	0	DL	6'4"	315	SO	Orlando, FL	North Carolina
Iverson Hooks	2	WR	5'10"	175	RS-SO	Pike Road, AL	UAB
Koi Perich	3	DB	6'1"	200	SO	Esko, MN	Minnesota
Dylan Raiola	8	QB	6'3"	230	SO	Buford, GA	Nebraska
Aaron Scott Jr.	14	CB	6'0"	195	SO	Springfield, OH	Ohio State
Carl Williams IV	15	S	6'1"	192	JR	Baton Rouge, LA	Baylor
Markus Dixon	17	DE	6'4"	265	RS-SO	Philadelphia, PA	Clemson
Andrew Olesh	19	TE	6'5"	226	FR	Center Valley, PA	Penn State
Simeon Price	22	RB	6'0"	215	SR	Pensacola, FL	Colorado
Bleu Dantzler	27	LB	6'2"	241	FR	Chandler, AZ	Oregon State
Arlo Henderson Jr.	29	DB	5'10"	200	JR	Yelm, WA	Mississippi Valley State
Keaton Emmett	35	K	6'0"	198	SO	Lake Oswego, OR	Nevada
Brody Thomas	35	OLB	6'2"	224	FR	Eugene, OR	Idaho
Bailey Ettridge	39	P	5'11"	216	FR	Lara, Australia	Nevada
RJ Todd	71	LS	6'1"	220	RS-JR	Rockford, MI	Western Michigan
Michael Bennett	75	OL	6'5"	302	SR	Atlanta, GA	Yale
Derrick Brown Jr.	91	DL	6'5"	295	RS-JR	Fort Washington, MD	Howard
Jerome Simmons	99	DL	6'4"	330	RS-JR	Bamberg, SC	ULM

==== Recruiting class ====
College recruiting (2026)
Name	Hometown	School	Height	Weight	Commit date
Overall recruit ranking:
Note: In many cases, Scout, Rivals, 247Sports, On3, and ESPN may conflict in their listings of height and weight.; In these cases, the average was taken. ESPN grades are on a 100-point scale.; Sources:

==== Coaches acquisitions ====
Name	Previous Position	New Position

== Statistics ==
=== Individual leaders ===
==== Offense ====
Passing statistics
#	NAME	POS	CMP	ATT	PCT	YDS	AVG/G	CMP%	TD	INT	LONG
	TOTALS										
	OPPONENTS										

Rushing statistics
#	NAME	POS	ATT	YDS	AVG	LNG	TD
	TOTALS						
	OPPONENTS						

Receiving statistics
#	NAME	POS	REC	YDS	AVG	LNG	TD
	TOTALS						
	OPPONENTS						

==== Defense ====
Defensive statistics
#	NAME	POS	SOLO	AST	CMB	TFL	SCK	INT	PD	FF	FR	TD
	TOTALS		0	0	0	0.0	0.0	0	0	0	0	0
	OPPONENTS		0	0	0	0.0	0.0	0	0	0	0	0

==== Special teams ====
Kicking statistics
#	NAME	POS	XPM	XPA	XP%	FGM	FGA	FG%	LNG
	OPPONENTS								

Punting statistics
#	NAME	POS	PUNTS	YDS	AVG	LNG	BLK	TB	I–20
	TOTALS								
	OPPONENTS								

Kick return statistics
#	NAME	POS	RET	YDS	AVG	LNG	TD
	TOTALS						
	OPPONENTS						

Punt return statistics
#	NAME	POS	RET	YDS	AVG	LNG	TD
	TOTALS						
	OPPONENTS						

== Rankings ==
Ranking movements Legend: ██ Increase in ranking ██ Decrease in ranking — = Not ranked RV = Received votes ( ) = First-place votes
	Week															
Poll	Pre	1	2	3	4	5	6	7	8	9	10	11	12	13	14	Final
AP	2 (14)	6 (3)	21	20	15	13	RV	RV	—	RV	18	14				
Coaches	2 (6)	6 (1)	18	16	15	13	25	25	RV	RV	19	14				
CFP	Not released									23	16	13				Not released
