= 2026 Portland State Vikings football team =

American college football season

2026 Portland State Vikings football
- Conference: Big Sky Conference
- Record: 3–9 (3–6 Big Sky)
- Head coach: Chris Fisk (1st season)
- Offensive coordinator: Matt Adkins (1st season)
- Offensive scheme: Spread
- Defensive coordinator: Grant Torgerson (1st season)
- Base defense: Multiple 3–4
- Home stadium: Hillsboro Stadium

2026 Big Sky Conference football standings
	Conf.			Overall
Team	W		L	W		L
No. 2 Montana State $^	8	–	1	11	–	1
No. 15 Weber State	7	–	2	8	–	4
No. 12 Northern Arizona	7	–	2	9	–	3
No. 8 Montana	6	–	3	8	–	4
No. 23 UC Davis	6	–	3	8	–	4
Idaho	5	–	4	5	–	7
Southern Utah	4	–	4	6	–	6
No. 25 Idaho State	4	–	5	7	–	5
Cal Poly	3	–	6	4	–	8
Portland State	3	–	6	3	–	9
Eastern Washington	2	–	7	3	–	9
Northern Colorado	2	–	7	3	–	9
Utah Tech	1	–	8	1	–	11
$ – Conference champion; ^ – FCS playoff participant; As of November 22, 2026; Rankings from STATS Poll

The 2026 Portland State Vikings football team will represent Portland State University as a member of the Big Sky Conference during the 2026 NCAA Division I FCS football season. The Vikings will be led by first-year head coach Chris Fisk and will play their home games at Hillsboro Stadium in Hillsboro, Oregon.

== Schedule ==
Date	Time	Opponent	Site	TV	Result	Attendance
August 29	12:00 p.m.	No. 6 UC Davis	Hillsboro Stadium; Hillsboro, OR	ESPN+	L 24–31	2,367
September 5	6:30 p.m.	at San Diego State*	Snapdragon Stadium; San Diego, CA	USA	L 20–53	26,913
September 12	7:00 p.m.	No. 6 North Dakota*	Hillsboro Stadium; Hillsboro, OR	ESPN+	L 23–47	1,455
September 18	7:30 p.m.	at No. 21 (FBS) Oregon*	Autzen Stadium; Eugene, OR	BTN	L 0–84	58,114
September 26	5:00 p.m.	at Weber State	Stewart Stadium; Ogden, UT	ESPN+	W 44–41	7,478
October 10	1:00 p.m.	Utah Tech	Hillsboro Stadium; Hillsboro, OR	ESPN+	W 30–14	1,964
October 17	4:00 p.m.	at No. 8 Northern Arizona	Walkup Skydome; Flagstaff, AZ	ESPN+	L 25–38	8,127
October 24	3:00 p.m.	at Idaho State	ICCU Dome; Pocatello, ID	ESPN+	L 8–38	5,747
October 31	1:00 p.m.	Idaho	Hillsboro Stadium; Hillsboro, OR	ESPN+	L 14–38	1,910
November 7	12:00 p.m.	at No. 12 Montana	Washington–Grizzly Stadium; Missoula, MT	ESPN+	L 24–57	25,079
November 13	7:00 p.m.	Southern Utah	Hillsboro Stadium; Hillsboro, OR	ESPN+	L 21–23	1,435
November 21	1:00 p.m.	at Eastern Washington	Roos Field; Cheney, WA (The Dam Cup)	ESPN+	W 40–38	3,742
*Non-conference game; Rankings from STATS Poll released prior to the game; All times are in Pacific time

== Game summaries ==
=== No. 6 UC Davis ===
No. 6 UC Davis Aggies (0–0) at Portland State Vikings (0–0) – Game summary

Quarter	1	2	3	4	Total
No. 6 Aggies	0	0	16	15	31
Vikings	14	7	0	3	24

at Hillsboro Stadium • Hillsboro, Oregon

- Date: August 29
- Game time: 12:00 p.m.
- Game weather: Sunny
- Game attendance: 2,367
- Referee: Mike Bezner
- TV announcers (ESPN+): Matt Richert, Scott Hermo, and Grace Peterson

Game information

First quarter

- PRST – Tyrese Smith 1-yard run (Joshua Hossmann Lees kick), 0:59. Vikings 7–0. Drive: 9 plays, 70 yards, 5:15.
- PRST – Cru Newman 78-yard punt return (Joshua Hossmann Lees kick), 0:00. Vikings 14–0.

Second quarter

- PRST – Tyrese Smith 1-yard run (Joshua Hossmann Lees kick), 0:08. Vikings 21–0. Drive: 16 plays, 87 yards, 5:06.

Third quarter

- UCD – Team safety, 9:42. Vikings 21–2.
- UCD – Jordan Fisher 1-yard run (Robert Meyer kick), 6:01. Vikings 21–9. Drive: 7 plays, 60 yards, 3:28.
- UCD – Jordan Fisher 4-yard run (Robert Meyer kick), 0:06. Vikings 21–16. Drive: 6 plays, 50 yards, 2:23.

Fourth quarter

- PRST – Joshua Hossmann Lees 24-yard field goal, 9:35. Vikings 24–16. Drive: 11 plays, 57 yards, 5:31.
- UCD – Samuel Gbatu Jr. 15-yard pass from Treynor Cleeland (Treynor Cleeland–Laviel Pickett pass), 2:19. Tied 24–24. Drive: 9 plays, 75 yards, 4:35.
- UCD – Laviel Picket 22-yard pass from Treynor Cleeland (Robert Meyer kick), 0:27. Aggies 31–24. Drive: 5 plays, 80 yards, 1:26.

Statistics	UCD	PRST
First downs	21	19
Plays–yards	65–374	73–357
Rushes–yards	26–87	37–89
Passing yards	287	268
Passing: comp–att–int	22–39–1	23–36–1
Turnovers	1	1
Time of possession	26:04	33:56

Team	Category	Player	Statistics
UC Davis	Passing	Treynor Cleeland	22/39, 287 yards, 2 TD, INT
UC Davis	Rushing	Jordan Fisher	14 carries, 65 yards, 2 TD
UC Davis	Receiving	Samuel Gbatu Jr.	8 receptions, 107 yards, TD
Portland State	Passing	Tyrese Smith	23/36, 268 yards, INT
Portland State	Rushing	Delon Thompson	15 carries, 48 yards
Portland State	Receiving	Devon Anderson	6 receptions, 99 yards

=== at San Diego State (FBS) ===
Portland State Vikings (0–1) at San Diego State Aztecs (FBS) (0–0) – Game summary

Quarter	1	2	3	4	Total
Vikings	6	0	7	7	20
Aztecs (FBS)	7	22	14	10	53

at Snapdragon Stadium • San Diego, California

- Date: September 5
- Game time: 6:30 p.m.
- Game weather: Sunny • Temperature: 86 °F (30 °C) • Wind: N at 6 miles per hour (9.7 km/h)
- Game attendance: 26,913
- Referee: Chris Snead
- TV announcers (USA): Ted Robinson, Darius Walker, and Dalen Cuff

Game information

First quarter

- PRST – Joshua Hossmann Lees 22-yard field goal, 6:46. Vikings 3–0. Drive: 14 plays, 60 yards, 5:34.
- PRST – Joshua Hossmann Lees 35-yard field goal, 2:14. Vikings 6–0. Drive: 8 plays, 44 yards, 2:52.
- SDSU – Nathan Acevedo 9-yard pass from Jayden Denegal (Cooper DiLeva kick), 0:33. Aztecs 7–6. Drive: 4 plays, 65 yards, 1:34.

Second quarter

- SDSU – Lucky Sutton 1-yard run (Cooper DiLeva kick), 14:04. Aztecs 14–6. Drive: 1 play, 1 yard, 0:03.
- SDSU – Justius Lowe 40-yard pass from Jayden Denegal (Bert Emanuel Jr. run), 8:40. Aztecs 22–6. Drive: 6 plays, 83 yards, 1:42.
- SDSU – Lucky Sutton 13-yard run (Cooper DiLeva kick), 2:37. Aztecs 29–6. Drive: 9 plays, 54 yards, 4:00.

Third quarter

- PRST – Terence Loville 10-yard pass from Gabe Downing (Joshua Hossmann Lees kick), 11:48. Aztecs 29–13. Drive: 2 plays, 10 yards, 0:48.
- SDSU – Jaylon Hawkins 100-yard kickoff return (Cooper DiLeva kick), 11:31. Aztecs 36–13.
- SDSU – Lucky Sutton 5-yard run (Cooper DiLeva kick), 6:16. Aztecs 43–13. Drive: 7 plays, 30 yards, 3:43.

Fourth quarter

- SDSU – Cooper DiLeva 31-yard field goal, 14:18. Aztecs 46–13. Drive: 8 plays, 61 yards, 3:45.
- PRST – Gabe Downing 1-yard run (Joshua Hossmann Lees kick), 5:16. Aztecs 46–20. Drive: 11 plays, 42 yards, 5:17.
- SDSU – Jordin Thomas 2-yard run (Cooper DiLeva kick), 3:03. Aztecs 53–20. Drive: 7 plays, 65 yards, 2:13.

Statistics	PRST	SDSU
First downs	21	22
Plays–yards	82–375	63–394
Rushes–yards	30–95	42–237
Passing yards	280	157
Passing: Comp–Att–Int	31–52–2	14–21–1
Turnovers	3	3
Time of possession	33:25	26:35

Team	Category	Player	Statistics
Portland State	Passing	Gabe Downing	31/52, 280 yards, TD, 2 INT
Portland State	Rushing	Delon Thompson	20 carries, 80 yards
Portland State	Receiving	Terence Loville	10 receptions, 119 yards, TD
San Diego State	Passing	Jayden Denegal	12/17, 137 yards, 2 TD, INT
San Diego State	Rushing	Javion Kinnard	8 carries, 79 yards
San Diego State	Receiving	Justius Lowe	2 receptions, 56 yards, TD

=== No. 6 North Dakota ===
No. 6 North Dakota Fighting Hawks (2–0) at Portland State Vikings (0–2) – Game summary

Quarter	1	2	3	4	Total
No. 6 Fighting Hawks	14	12	0	21	47
Vikings	0	8	8	7	23

at Hillsboro Stadium • Hillsboro, Oregon

- Date: September 12
- Game time: 7:00 p.m.
- Game weather: Cloudy • Temperature: 59 °F (15 °C) • Wind: NE at 6 miles per hour (9.7 km/h)
- Game attendance: 1,455
- Referee: Robert Quello
- TV announcers (ESPN+): Matt Richert (play-by-play), Scott Hermo (analyst) and Grace Peterson (sideline)

Game information

First quarter

- (11:27) UND – Mason South 11-yard pass from Jerry Kaminski (Drive: 8 plays, 68 yards, 3:27; North Dakota 6–0)
- (4:01) UND – Tray Kuntz 1-yard pass from Jerry Kaminski, Deng Deng pass (Drive: 8 plays, 75 yards, 4:03; North Dakota 14–0)

Second quarter

- (9:35) UND – Kenton Laughman 38-yard field goal (Drive: 10 plays, 60 yards, 3:56; North Dakota 17–0)
- (4:14) PRST – Tanner Beaman 7-yard pass from Gabe Downing, Tanner Beaman pass (Drive: 4 plays, 54 yards, 2:03; North Dakota 17–8)
- (3:59) UND – Charles Langama 99-yard kickoff return, Kenten Laughman kick (North Dakota 24–8)
- (0:26) UND – 0-yard safety (North Dakota 26–8)

Third quarter

- (1:38) PRST – Cru Newman 2-yard pass from Gabe Downing, Tanner Beaman pass (Drive: 11 plays, 80 yards, 5:03; North Dakota 26–16)

Fourth quarter

- (14:20) UND – Matt Lawson 26-yard run, Kenten Laughman kick (Drive: 5 plays, 80 yards, 2:13; North Dakota 33–16)
- (12:04) UND – Korey Tai 74-yard pass from Jerry Kaminski, Kenten Laughman kick (Drive: 3 plays, 99 yards, 1:06; North Dakota 40–16)
- (10:01) UND – Javance Tupou'ata-Johnson 10-yard run, Kenten Laughman kick (Drive: 2 plays, 14 yards, 0:47; North Dakota 47–16)
- (6:29) PRST – Darius Bailey 39-yard pass from Gabe Downing, Joshua Hossmann Lees kick (Drive: 9 plays, 75 yards, 3:32; North Dakota 47–23)

Statistics	UND	PRST
First downs	28	20
Plays–yards	68–627	68–344
Rushes–yards	39–291	29–111
Passing yards	336	233
Passing: comp–att–int	21–29–1	23–39–0
Turnovers	1	1
Time of possession	29:47	30:13

Team	Category	Player	Statistics
North Dakota	Passing	Jerry Kaminski	21/29, 336 yards, 3 TD, INT
North Dakota	Rushing	Charles Langama	6 carries, 83 yards
North Dakota	Receiving	Korey Tai	4 receptions, 140 yards, TD
Portland State	Passing	Gabe Downing	23/39, 233 yards, 3 TD
Portland State	Rushing	Delon Thompson	14 carries, 58 yards
Portland State	Receiving	Terence Loville	3 receptions, 71 yards

=== at No. 21 (FBS) Oregon ===
Portland State Vikings (0–3) at No. 21 (FBS) Oregon Ducks (1–1) – Game summary

Quarter	1	2	3	4	Total
Vikings	0	0	0	0	0
No. 21 (FBS) Ducks	28	21	14	21	84

at Autzen Stadium • Eugene, Oregon

- Date: September 18
- Game time: 7:30 p.m.
- Game weather: Sunny • Temperature: 68 °F (20 °C) • Wind: N at 6 miles per hour (9.7 km/h)
- Game attendance: 58,114
- Referee: Jeremy Valentine
- TV announcers (BTN): Mark Followill, Rhett Lewis, and Kenjon Barner

Game information

First quarter

- ORE – Jordon Davison 3-yard run (Gage Hurych kick), 11:45. Ducks 7–0. Drive: 8 plays, 72 yards, 3:12.
- ORE – Dakorien Moore 45-yard pass from Dante Moore (Gage Hurych kick), 9:14. Ducks 14–0. Drive: 2 plays, 67 yards, 0:49.
- ORE – Jordon Davison 5-yard run (Gage Hurych kick), 6:58. Ducks 21–0. Drive: 4 plays, 19 yards, 2:09.
- ORE – Evan Stewart 39-yard pass from Dante Moore (Gage Hurych kick), 4:59. Ducks 28–0. Drive: 2 plays, 57 yards, 0:24.

Second quarter

- ORE – Kendre Harrison 10-yard pass from Dante Moore (Gage Hurych kick), 13:33. Ducks 35–0. Drive: 9 plays, 83 yards, 4:04.
- ORE – Dierre Hill Jr. 7-yard run (Rocco Graziano kick), 5:23. Ducks 42–0. Drive: 12 plays, 80 yards, 6:13.
- ORE – Messiah Hampton 7-yard pass from Dante Moore (Gage Hurych kick), 1:45. Ducks 49–0. Drive: 6 plays, 37 yards, 1:59.

Third quarter

- ORE – Andrew Olesh 13-yard pass from Dylan Raiola (Rocco Graziano kick), 9:27. Ducks 56–0. Drive: 9 plays, 80 yards, 4:15.
- ORE – Messiah Hampton 17-yard pass from Dylan Raiola (Rocco Graziano kick), 4:08. Ducks 63–0. Drive: 4 plays, 57 yards, 1:28.

Fourth quarter

- ORE – Brady Bidwell 7-yard pass from Dylan Raiola (Rocco Graziano kick), 14:55. Ducks 70–0. Drive: 9 plays, 38 yards, 4:08.
- ORE – Tradarian Ball 6-yard run (Rocco Graziano kick), 8:08. Ducks 77–0. Drive: 12 plays, 78 yards, 4:30.
- ORE – Brandon Smith 2-yard run (Rocco Graziano kick), 0:29. Ducks 84–0. Drive: 14 plays, 79 yards, 5:16.

Statistics	PRST	ORE
First downs	5	43
Plays–yards	37–103	94–740
Rushes–yards	17–2	51–289
Passing yards	101	451
Passing: comp–att–int	8–20–3	35–43–0
Turnovers	4	0
Time of possession	18:42	41:18

Team	Category	Player	Statistics
Portland State	Passing	Gabe Downing	8/20, 101 yards, 3 INT
Portland State	Rushing	Delon Thompson	9 carries, 12 yards
Portland State	Receiving	Terence Loville	2 receptions, 50 yards
Oregon	Passing	Dante Moore	19/23, 280 yards, 4 TD
Oregon	Rushing	Brandon Smith	16 carries, 85 yards, TD
Oregon	Receiving	Evan Stewart	3 receptions, 72 yards, TD

=== at Weber State ===
Portland State Vikings (0–4) at Weber State Wildcats (2–2) – Game summary

Quarter	1	2	3	4	Total
Vikings	21	7	10	6	44
Wildcats	7	14	13	7	41

at Stewart Stadium • Ogden, Utah

- Date: September 26
- Game time: 5:00 p.m.
- Game weather: Sunny • Temperature: 75 °F (24 °C) • Wind: W at 4 miles per hour (6.4 km/h)
- Game attendance: 7,478
- Referee: Jim Crowley
- TV announcers (ESPN+): Mike Folta (play-by-play) and Riley Jensen (analyst)

Game information

First quarter

- PRST – 10:17 Delon Thompson 35-yard run (Joshua Hossmann Lees kick). PRST 7–0. Drive: 4 plays, 70 yards, 1:53.
- WEB – 6:46 Seth Rigtrup 31-yard run (David Dellenbach kick). TIED 7–7. Drive: 9 plays, 75 yards, 3:31.
- PRST – 6:32 Zui Shelton 95-yard kickoff return (Joshua Hossmann Lees kick). PRST 14–7.
- PRST – 3:09 Delon Thompson 1-yard run (Joshua Hossmann Lees kick). PRST 21–7. Drive: 5 plays, 18 yards, 1:51.

Second quarter

- PRST – 5:33 Terence Loville 58-yard pass from John-Keawe Sagapolutele (Joshua Hossmann Lees kick). PRST 28–7. Drive: 2 plays, 87 yards, 1:14.
- WEB – 1:34 Marvin Session 31-yard pass from Nate Dahle (David Dellenbach kick). PRST 28–14. Drive: 10 plays, 75 yards, 3:59.
- WEB – 0:19 Marvin Session 80-yard pass from Nate Dahle (David Dellenbach kick). PRST 28–21. Drive: 2 plays, 80 yards, 0:15.

Third quarter

- PRST – 11:47 Joshua Hossmann Lees 42-yard Field Goal. PRST 31–21. Drive: 9 plays, 59 yards, 3:09.
- PRST – 11:03 Delon Thompson 33-yard run (Joshua Hossmann Lees kick). PRST 38–21. Drive: 2 plays, 33 yards, 0:18.
- WEB – 7:04 Marvin Session 27-yard pass from Nate Dahle (kick blocked). PRST 38–27. Drive: 10 plays, 75 yards, 3:59.
- WEB – 5:19 Noah Kjar 16-yard pass from Nate Dahle (David Dellenbach kick). PRST 38–34. Drive: 3 plays, 52 yards, 0:54.

Fourth quarter

- PRST – 3:13 Joshua Hossmann Lees 31-yard Field Goal. PRST 41–34. Drive: 8 plays, 61 yards, 4:47.
- WEB – 1:53 Noah Kjar 30-yard pass from Nate Dahle (David Dellenbach kick). TIED 41–41. Drive: 4 plays, 51 yards, 1:12.
- PRST – 0:00 Joshua Hossmann Lees 41-yard Field Goal. PRST 44–41. Drive: 3 plays, 21 yards, 0:16.

Statistics	PRST	WEB
First downs	16	26
Plays–yards	64–409	84–703
Rushes–yards	39–277	39–239
Passing yards	161	488
Passing: comp–att–int	9–25–1	22–45–3
Turnovers	1	3
Time of possession	25:49	30:48

Team	Category	Player	Statistics
Portland State	Passing	John-Keawe Sagapolutele	9/24, 161 yards, TD, INT
Portland State	Rushing	Delon Thompson	23 carries, 213 yards, 3 TD
Portland State	Receiving	Terence Loville	5 receptions, 130 yards, TD
Weber State	Passing	Nate Dahle	15/27, 338 yards, 5 TD, 2 INT
Weber State	Rushing	Omar Shah	13 carries, 76 yards
Weber State	Receiving	Marvin Session	5 receptions, 175 yards, 3 TD

=== Utah Tech ===
Utah Tech Trailblazers (0–6) at Portland State Vikings (1–4) – Game summary

Quarter	1	2	3	4	Total
Trailblazers	0	0	0	0	0
Vikings	0	0	0	0	0

at Hillsboro Stadium • Hillsboro, Oregon

- Date: October 10
- Game time: 1:00 p.m.

Game information

First quarter
Second quarter
Third quarter
Fourth quarter

Statistics	UTU	PRST
First downs		
Plays–yards		
Rushes–yards		
Passing yards		
Passing: comp–att–int		
Turnovers		
Time of possession		

Team	Category	Player	Statistics
Utah Tech	Passing		
Utah Tech	Rushing		
Utah Tech	Receiving		
Portland State	Passing		
Portland State	Rushing		
Portland State	Receiving		

=== at No. 8 Northern Arizona ===
Portland State Vikings (2–4) at No. 8 Northern Arizona Lumberjacks (5–2) – Game summary

Quarter	1	2	3	4	Total
Vikings	0	0	0	0	0
No. 8 Lumberjacks	0	0	0	0	0

at Walkup Skydome • Flagstaff, Arizona

- Date: October 17
- Game time: 4:00 p.m.

Game information

First quarter
Second quarter
Third quarter
Fourth quarter

Statistics	PRST	NAU
First downs		
Plays–yards		
Rushes–yards		
Passing yards		
Passing: comp–att–int		
Turnovers		
Time of possession		

Team	Category	Player	Statistics
Portland State	Passing		
Portland State	Rushing		
Portland State	Receiving		
Northern Arizona	Passing		
Northern Arizona	Rushing		
Northern Arizona	Receiving		

=== at Idaho State ===
Portland State Vikings (2–5) at Idaho State Bengals (4–3) – Game summary

Quarter	1	2	3	4	Total
Vikings	0	0	0	0	0
Bengals	0	0	0	0	0

at ICCU Dome • Pocatello, Idaho

- Date: October 24
- Game time: 4:00 p.m.

Game information

First quarter
Second quarter
Third quarter
Fourth quarter

Statistics	PRST	IDST
First downs		
Plays–yards		
Rushes–yards		
Passing yards		
Passing: comp–att–int		
Turnovers		
Time of possession		

Team	Category	Player	Statistics
Portland State	Passing		
Portland State	Rushing		
Portland State	Receiving		
Idaho State	Passing		
Idaho State	Rushing		
Idaho State	Receiving		

=== Idaho ===
Idaho Vandals (3–5) at Portland State Vikings (2–6) – Game summary

Quarter	1	2	3	4	Total
Vandals	14	10	7	7	38
Vikings	7	0	0	7	14

at Hillsboro Stadium • Hillsboro, Oregon

- Date: October 31
- Game time: 1:00 p.m.
- Game weather: Cloudy
- Game attendance: 1,910
- Referee: Jim Crowley
- TV announcers (ESPN+): Matt Richert (play-by-play), Scott Hermo (analyst) and Grace Peterson (sideline)

Game information

First quarter

- IDHO – Zack Card 28-yard pass from Joshua Wood (Owen Forsman kick), 12:08. Idaho 7–0. Drive: 8 plays, 75 yards, 2:52.
- PRST – Terence Loville 4-yard pass from Gabe Downing (Joshua Hossmann Lees kick), 3:09. Tied 7–7. Drive: 5 plays, 35 yards, 2:49.
- IDHO – Damonte Bias 6-yard pass from Joshua Wood (Owen Forsman kick), 0:55. Idaho 14–7. Drive: 7 plays, 75 yards, 2:14.

Second quarter

- IDHO – Owen Forsman 47-yard field goal, 1:55. Idaho 17–7. Drive: 5 plays, 23 yards, 1:54.
- IDHO – Ryan Jezioro 77-yard pass from Joshua Wood (Owen Forsman kick), 0:44. Idaho 24–7. Drive: 1 play, 77 yards, 0:14.

Third quarter

- IDHO – Damonte Bias 4-yard run (Owen Forsman kick), 13:07. Idaho 31–7. Drive: 2 plays, 31 yards, 0:46.

Fourth quarter

- IDHO – Joshua Wood 1-yard run (Owen Forsman kick), 6:25. Idaho 38–7. Drive: 14 plays, 92 yards, 7:37.
- PRST – Terence Loville 2-yard pass from John-Keawe Sagapolutele (Joshua Hossmann Lees kick), 0:51. Idaho 38–14. Drive: 11 plays, 83 yards, 5:27.

Statistics	IDHO	PRST
First downs	19	19
Plays–yards	60–469	63–294
Rushes–yards	35–166	23–13
Passing yards	303	281
Passing: comp–att–int	16–25–1	29–40–0
Turnovers	1	0
Time of possession	29:43	30:17

Team	Category	Player	Statistics
Idaho	Passing	Joshua Wood	16/25, 303 yards, 3 TD, INT
Idaho	Rushing	Kenny Golston	8 carries, 55 yards
Idaho	Receiving	Ryan Jezioro	5 receptions, 194 yards, TD
Portland State	Passing	Gabe Downing	14/21, 140 yards, TD
Portland State	Rushing	Delon Thompson	11 carries, 39 yards
Portland State	Receiving	Terence Loville	9 receptions, 114 yards, 2 TD

=== at No. 12 Montana ===
Portland State Vikings (2–7) at No. 12 Montana Grizzlies (6–3) – Game summary

Quarter	1	2	3	4	Total
Vikings	0	0	0	0	0
No. 12 Grizzlies	0	0	0	0	0

at Washington–Grizzly Stadium • Missoula, Montana

- Date: November 7
- Game time: 12:00 p.m.

Game information

First quarter
Second quarter
Third quarter
Fourth quarter

Statistics	PRST	MONT
First downs		
Plays–yards		
Rushes–yards		
Passing yards		
Passing: comp–att–int		
Turnovers		
Time of possession		

Team	Category	Player	Statistics
Portland State	Passing		
Portland State	Rushing		
Portland State	Receiving		
Montana	Passing		
Montana	Rushing		
Montana	Receiving		

=== Southern Utah ===
Southern Utah Thunderbirds (4–6) at Portland State Vikings (2–8) – Game summary

Quarter	1	2	3	4	Total
Thunderbirds	0	0	0	0	0
Vikings	0	0	0	0	0

at Hillsboro Stadium • Hillsboro, Oregon

- Date: November 13
- Game time: 7:00 p.m.

Game information

First quarter
Second quarter
Third quarter
Fourth quarter

Statistics	SUU	PRST
First downs		
Plays–yards		
Rushes–yards		
Passing yards		
Passing: comp–att–int		
Turnovers		
Time of possession		

Team	Category	Player	Statistics
Southern Utah	Passing		
Southern Utah	Rushing		
Southern Utah	Receiving		
Portland State	Passing		
Portland State	Rushing		
Portland State	Receiving		

=== at Eastern Washington (The Dam Cup) ===
Portland State Vikings (2–9) at Eastern Washington Eagles (3–8) – Game summary

Quarter	1	2	3	4	Total
Vikings	0	0	0	0	0
Eagles	0	0	0	0	0

at Roos Field • Cheney, Washington

- Date: November 21
- Game time: 1:00 p.m.

Game information

First quarter
Second quarter
Third quarter
Fourth quarter

Statistics	PRST	EWU
First downs		
Plays–yards		
Rushes–yards		
Passing yards		
Passing: comp–att–int		
Turnovers		
Time of possession		

Team	Category	Player	Statistics
Portland State	Passing		
Portland State	Rushing		
Portland State	Receiving		
Eastern Washington	Passing		
Eastern Washington	Rushing		
Eastern Washington	Receiving		

== Rankings ==
Ranking movements Legend: ██ Increase in ranking ██ Decrease in ranking — = Not ranked RV = Received votes
	Week														
Poll	Pre	1	2	3	4	5	6	7	8	9	10	11	12	13	Final
STATS	—	—	—												
Coaches	—	—	RV												
