= Brock Thomas =

American football player

No. 12 – Oregon Ducks
- Position: Quarterback
- Class: Senior

Personal information
- Listed height: 5 ft 11 in (1.80 m)
- Listed weight: 182 lb (83 kg)

Career information
- High school: Sheldon (Eugene, Oregon)
- College: Oregon (2023–present)
- Stats at ESPN

Brock Thomas is an American college football quarterback for the Oregon Ducks.

== Early life ==
Thomas attended Sheldon High School in Eugene, Oregon. He committed to play college football for the Oregon Ducks as a preferred walk-on over offers from Air Force, Army, Eastern Washington, Northern Arizona, and Portland State.

== College career ==
Thomas played two games and was redshirted in 2023 and did not play any games in 2024. In week 10 of the 2025 season, he entered for an injured Dante Moore and completed all four of his pass attempts for 46 yards and a touchdown in a 21-7 win over Wisconsin. In six games, Thomas completed 12 of 16 passes for 130 yards and a touchdown. In week 6 of the 2026 season, Thomas entered the game in the fourth quarter after Dylan Raiola was benched, completing 11 of 15 passes for 156 yards and a touchdown in a loss to UCLA.

=== Statistics ===
Season	Team	Games			Passing								Rushing			
Season	Team	GP	GS	Record	Comp	Att	Pct	Yards	Avg	TD	Int	Rate	Att	Yards	Avg	TD
2023	Oregon	2	0	—	No stats recorded											
2024	Oregon	Did not play														
2025	Oregon	7	0	—	12	16	75.0	130	8.1	1	0	163.9	9	17	1.9	0
2026	Oregon	3	1	1–0	23	40	57.5	226	5.7	1	1	108.6	5	-8	-1.6	0
Career		12	1	1–0	35	56	62.5	356	6.4	2	1	124.1	14	9	0.6	0
