= James Monroe High School (Rochester, New York) =

Public school in New York, United States

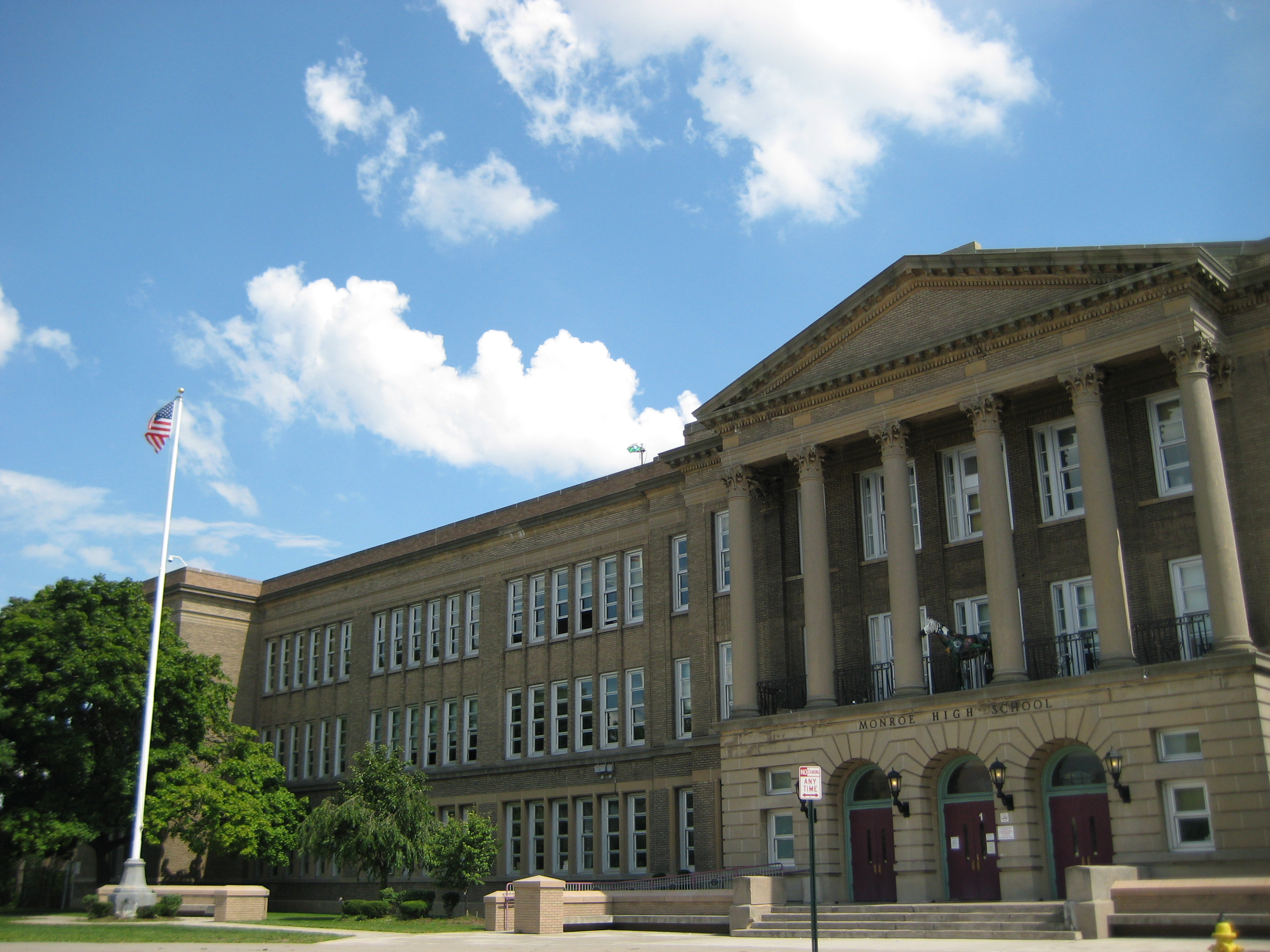

Location
- 164 Alexander St; Rochester, New York 14607; United States; 43°08′50″N 77°35′55″W

Information
- Type: Public
- Motto: "We are the Jewel of the City"
- Established: 1923; 103 years ago
- School district: Rochester City School District
- NCES School ID: 362475003371
- Principal: Jason Muhammad
- Teaching staff: 67.31 (on an FTE basis)
- Grades: 9-12
- Enrollment: 649 (2023-2024)
- Student to teacher ratio: 9.64
- Campus: Urban
- Colors: Red, White and Blue
- Slogan: "We are the Jewel of the City"
- Athletics conference: Section V
- Mascot: Redjackets
- Newspaper: TBD
- Yearbook: Monrolog
- Website: www.rcsdk12.org/monroe

James Monroe High School is a public high school in Rochester, operated by the Rochester City School District.

== History ==
James Monroe High School, located on Alexander Street at the corner of Pearl Street, was completed and occupied as a Junior high school in September, 1923. In June; 1924, the first Junior high school graduation exercises were held, and because of crowded conditions at East High School, it was decided to retain tenth-year pupils in the school for at least a year. In 1926 it was permanently agreed that the school would be a Junior-senior high school; and the cafeteria was erected on the site of the old No. 15 School adjacent to the playground. The total cost of the school was $1,410,059.88, and of the cafeteria addition, $111,642.40. The building was known as Monroe Junior High School, 1923–1926; as Monroe High School, 1926–1931; as Monroe Junior Senior High School, 1931–1935; as Monroe High School, 1935–1988; Monroe Middle School, 1988–2005; and returned to a Junior-Senior high school in 2006. The building will transition to a high school, grades 9-12, September 2024.

=== Alma mater ===
Sing, oh fellow students, praise of dear Monroe,

Praise that shall not falter, but shall ever grow
As those coming pupils in her lobed halls throng
With undying ardor, join us in song.

Let the stirring chorus bring to us the day
When we yet were treading youthful Learning's way.
Let her colors streaming proudly to the sky
Symbolize those standards kept by us as high.

Come, oh fellow classmates, join with us and sing
To our Alma Mater, let her praises ring.
We'll obey her teaching, strive to serve her well.
Hail, our Monroe High School. Hail, and now Farewell!

— Janet L. Wile '27,

== Notable alumni ==
- David Diamond, composer
- Malcolm Glazer, investor and football team owner
- Messiah Hampton – 2026 – college football wide receiver for the Oregon Ducks
- Daniel Katzen - 1970
- Mollie Katzen - 1968
- Alan Levin (aka Brother Wease) - 1965
- Arthur Rock, venture capitalist

== Campus architecture ==
The stone and brick structure features Greek columns and a pediment on the main facade.

== Extracurriculars ==
=== Clubs and organizations ===
- Writing Club
- Student Government
- Yearbook
- Esports Club
- Shine Bright After School Acceleration Program
- Chess Club

=== Athletics ===
On December 6, 2025 the Monroe Red Jackets became the first school in Rochester City School District history to win a state football title.

On March 7, 2026 the Monroe Red Jackets broke an 80 year drought and won the Class A Basketball Sectional Title, Defeating Wayne 49-47. This also made Head Coach Terell Cunningham the first coach in Rochester NY to win a Football State Championship and a Sectional title in Basketball in the same year. Also making history was Monroes lead assistant Kason “ KiD “ Morrison, being the first coach to win a sectional title with both the Boys and Girls ( The Aquinas Institute ) in 2024, respectively .
