= Dylan Raiola =

American football player (born 2005)

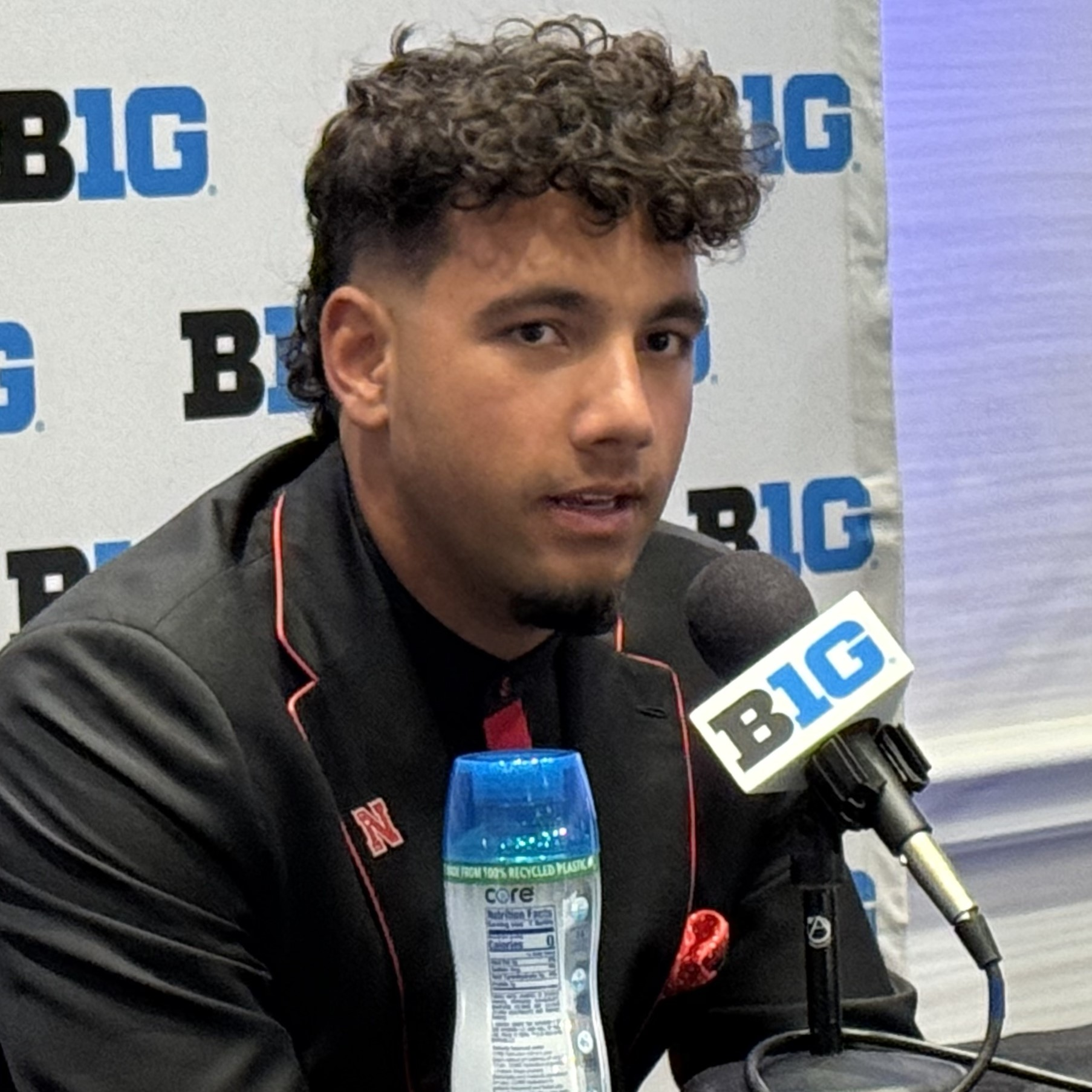
- Raiola in 2025

No. 8 – Oregon Ducks
- Position: Quarterback
- Class: Junior

Personal information
- Born: May 9, 2005 (age 21); Honolulu, Hawaii, U.S.
- Listed height: 6 ft 3 in (1.91 m)
- Listed weight: 230 lb (104 kg)

Career information
- High school: Buford (Buford, Georgia)
- College: Nebraska (2024–2025); Oregon (2026–present)

Awards and highlights
- Polynesian High School Football Player of the Year (2023)
- Stats at ESPN

Dylan Anthony Raiola (born May 9, 2005) is an American college football quarterback who plays for the Oregon Ducks. He previously played for the Nebraska Cornhuskers. He was one of the top-ranked prospects in the 2024 recruiting class.

== Early life ==
Raiola was born on May 9, 2005, in Hawaii. He began his high school career at Burleson High School in Burleson, Texas, where he passed for 3,341 yards, 32 touchdowns, and five interceptions, while also rushing for nine touchdowns. After the season, he transferred to Chandler High School in Arizona, where during his junior season, he passed for 2,435 yards, 22 touchdowns, and had 5 interceptions. He transferred to Buford High School in Buford, Georgia, for his senior season.

Raiola was a consensus top 10 recruit in the 2024 class by the major recruiting services. In May 2022, he committed to play at Ohio State, but in December he decided to reopen his recruitment. In January 2023, he announced his top four schools, which were Georgia, Nebraska, Oregon, and USC, and ultimately announced that he committed to Georgia on May 15. On December 18, 2023, Raiola flipped his commitment from Georgia to Nebraska. On December 20, he officially signed with Nebraska.

College recruiting
Name	Hometown	School	Height	Weight	Commit date
Dylan Raiola; QB	Buford, Georgia	Buford	6 ft 3 in (1.91 m)	220 lb (100 kg)	Dec 18, 2023
Dylan Raiola; QB	Recruit ratings: Rivals: 247Sports: ESPN: (91)				
Overall recruit ranking: Rivals: 1 (QB) 247Sports: 2 (QB) ESPN: 1 (QB)
Note: In many cases, Scout, Rivals, 247Sports, On3, and ESPN may conflict in their listings of height and weight.; In these cases, the average was taken. ESPN grades are on a 100-point scale.; Sources: "2023 Team Ranking". Rivals.com.

== College career ==
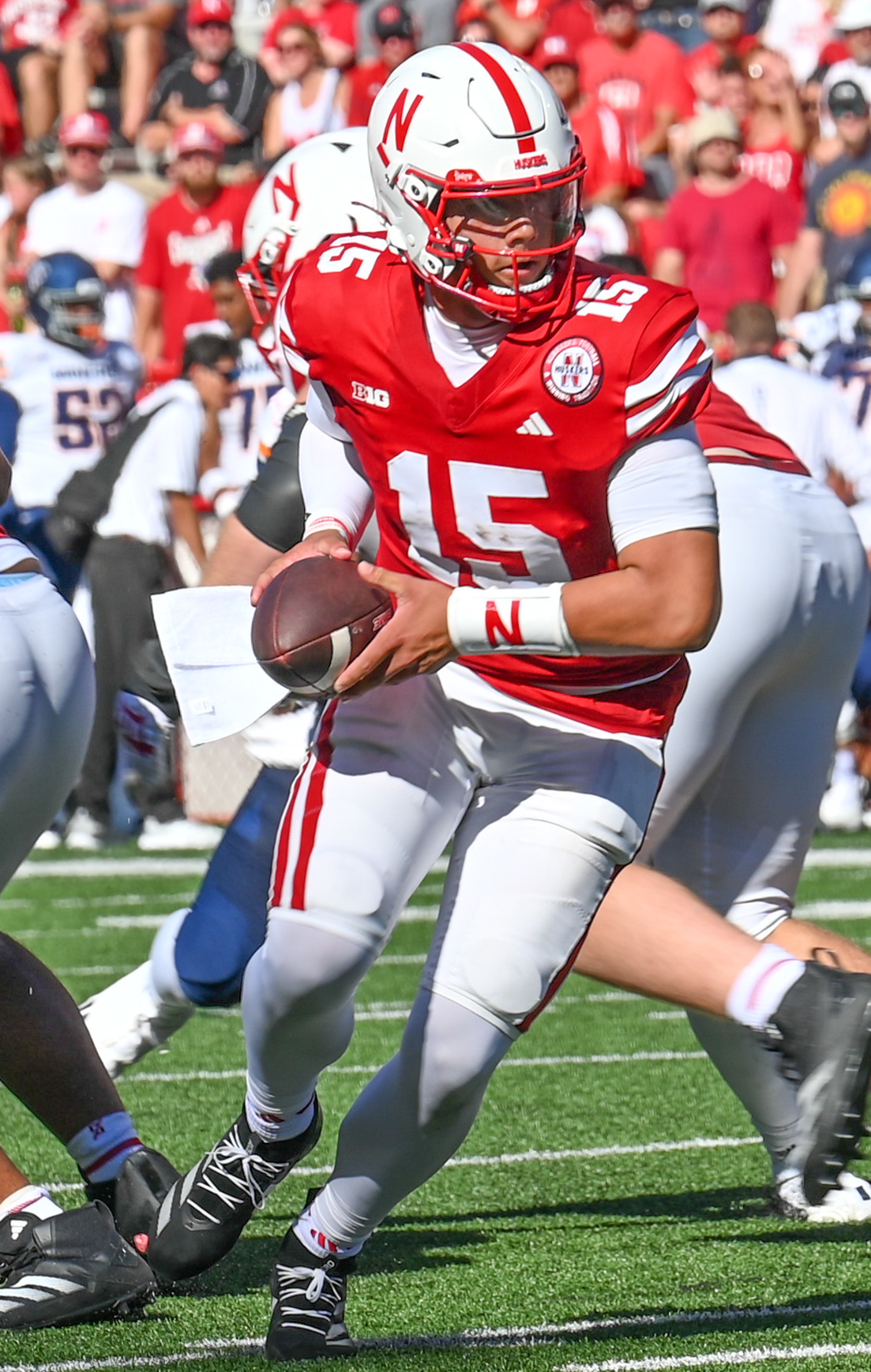
Raiola playing his freshman season in 2024

=== Nebraska Cornhuskers ===
==== 2024 season ====
In 2024, during his true freshman season with Nebraska, Raiola gained widespread attention for emulating NFL quarterback Patrick Mahomes, exhibiting similar haircuts, mannerisms, and pre-game routines. He helped Nebraska reach bowl eligibility for the first time since 2016.

==== 2025 season ====
On November 1, 2025, in a 21–17 loss to the USC Trojans, Raiola suffered a broken fibula, ending his season prematurely. Following the conclusion of the Cornhuskers' season, he announced that he would be entering the transfer portal.

=== Oregon Ducks ===
==== 2026 season ====
On January 12, 2026, Raiola committed to the Oregon Ducks. He will wear the jersey No.8. Since Marcus Mariota won the Heisman Trophy wearing the number, it has been considered special. Former Duck, now NFL quarterback Dillon Gabriel wore the number in 2024. Raiola asked both Mariota and Gabriel for their blessing before taking the number; both said it was ok to wear the number.

He began the season as the primary backup to Dante Moore, ahead of Brock Thomas and Akili Smith Jr.. Raiola made his Ducks debut in Week 3 of the 2026 season, relieving Moore to start the second half against Portland State. He completed all 11 of his pass attempts for 124 yards and three touchdowns in the 84–0 victory. The following week against No. 12 USC, Moore suffered a season ending injury in the first half, prompting Raiola to take over. He completed 19 of 25 passes for 289 yards and two touchdowns in the win. Raiola made his first Ducks start the following week against No. 21 UCLA but struggled, completing just 6 of 19 passes for 43 yards and throwing two interceptions before being benched in favor of Thomas in the loss. The following week against his former school, Nebraska, Raiola entered the game in relief of a struggling Thomas. He completed 11 of 18 passes for 59 yards, including a game-winning four-yard touchdown pass to Jamari Johnson in the final minute to secure a 17–14 victory.

=== Statistics ===
Year	Team	Games			Passing								Rushing			
Year	Team	GP	GS	Record	Cmp	Att	Pct	Yds	Y/A	TD	Int	Rtg	Att	Yds	Avg	TD
2024	Nebraska	13	13	7–6	275	410	67.1	2,819	6.9	13	11	129.9	50	−65	−1.3	0
2025	Nebraska	9	9	6–3	181	250	72.4	2,000	8.0	18	6	158.6	46	−87	−1.9	0
2026	Oregon	7	4	2–2	121	185	65.4	1,354	7.3	11	2	144.3	9	−14	−1.6	0
Career		29	26	15–11	577	845	68.3	6,173	7.3	42	19	141.6	105	-166	-1.6	0

== Personal life ==
Raiola is of Polynesian descent. He is the son of former NFL player Dominic Raiola, who played for Nebraska and won the Rimington Trophy, the nephew of former Cornhuskers offensive line coach and Wisconsin Badgers center Donovan Raiola, and the godson of Matthew Stafford, who was a teammate on the Detroit Lions with his father.

Raiola is a Christian.
