= Messiah Hampton =

American football player

No. 15 – Oregon Ducks
- Position: Wide receiver
- Class: Freshman

Personal information
- Listed height: 6 ft 1 in (1.85 m)
- Listed weight: 190 lb (86 kg)

Career information
- High school: James Monroe (Rochester, New York)
- College: Oregon (2026–present)
- Stats at ESPN

Messiah Hampton is an American college football wide receiver for the Oregon Ducks.

== Early life ==
Hampton is from Rochester, New York. He attended James Monroe High School where he competed in football and ran track. As a sophomore, he had 497 receiving yards and 13 touchdowns. He then caught 56 passes for 869 yards and eight touchdowns during his junior year. During his senior year, Hampton broke the all-time Section V record in receiving yards. He totaled 62 receptions for 1,224 yards and 13 touchdowns on offense, along with 87 tackles and two interceptions on defense, while helping the team to their first state championship with an undefeated record of 12–0. Hampton was named the New York Player of the Year by MaxPreps and the Gatorade New York Player of the Year for his performance. A four-star recruit and the top prospect in New York, he committed to play college football for the Oregon Ducks.

== College career ==
Hampton impressed for the Ducks in training camp before the 2026 season. Due to injuries to other players, he began starting for Oregon early in the season. Through four games, he caught 14 passes for 142 yards and two touchdowns.
