= George Moore (gridiron football) =

American gridiron football player (born 1996)

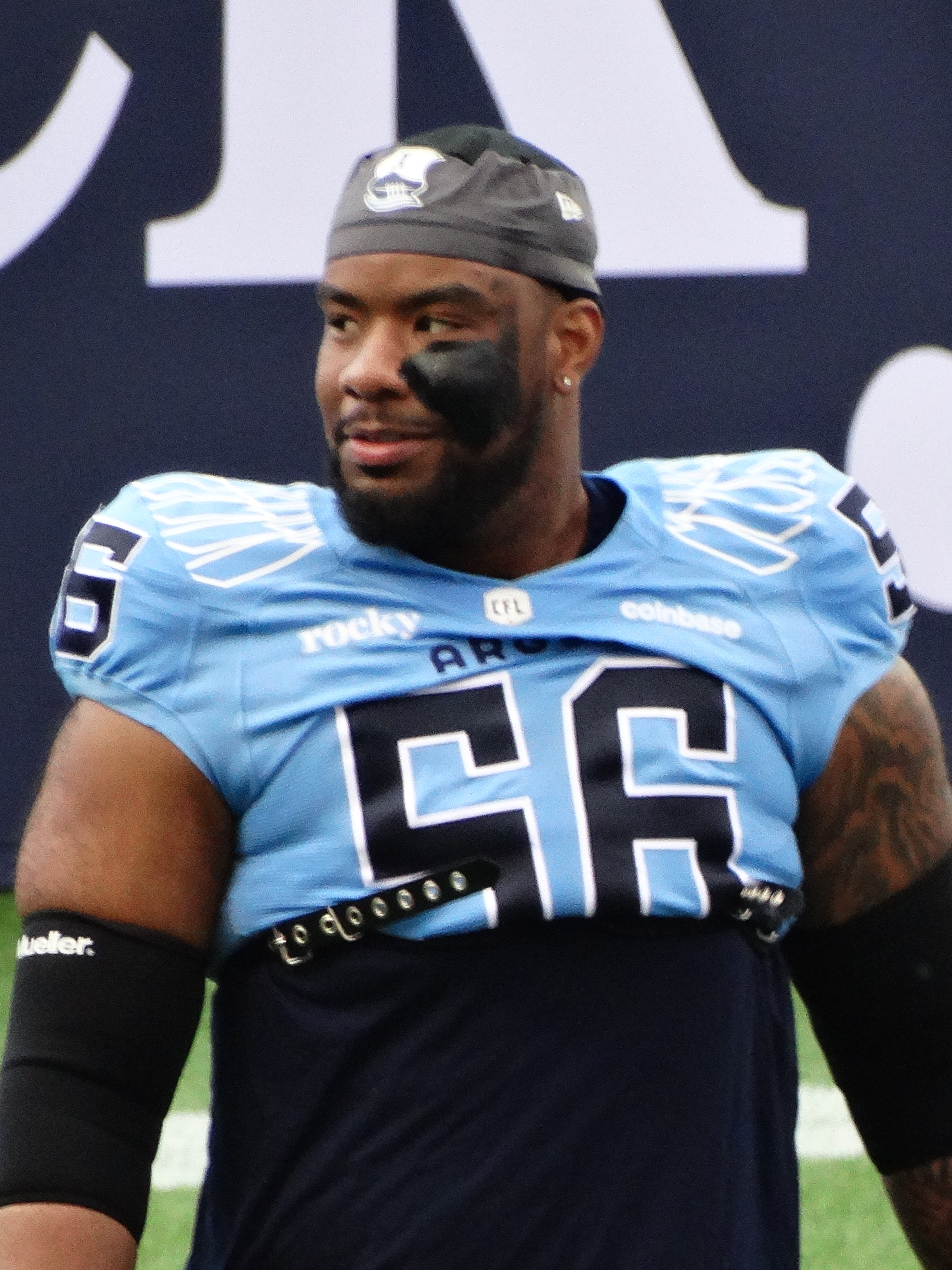
- Moore with the Toronto Argonauts in 2025

No. 56 – Toronto Argonauts
- Position: Offensive lineman
- Roster status: Active
- CFL status: American

Personal information
- Born: July 31, 1996 (age 30); Antioch, California, U.S.
- Listed height: 6 ft 6 in (1.98 m)
- Listed weight: 324 lb (147 kg)

Career information
- High school: Deer Valley High
- College: College of San Mateo; Oregon

Career history
- 2022: Green Bay Packers*
- 2022: Dallas Cowboys*
- 2023: Denver Broncos*
- 2023: Arlington Renegades
- 2024: Seattle Sea Dragons*
- 2024: DC Defenders*
- 2024: San Antonio Brahmas
- 2024–present: Toronto Argonauts
- * Offseason or practice squad member only

Awards and highlights
- Grey Cup champion (2024)
- Stats at CFL.ca

George Moore (born July 31, 1996) is an American professional football offensive lineman for the Toronto Argonauts of the Canadian Football League (CFL).

== College career ==
Moore played college football for the College of San Mateo from 2015 to 2016. He then transferred to the University of Oregon to play for the Ducks from 2017 to 2021.

== Professional career ==
Pre-draft measurables
Height	Weight	Arm length	Hand span	Wingspan	40-yard dash	10-yard split	20-yard split	20-yard shuttle	Three-cone drill	Vertical jump	Broad jump	Bench press
6 ft 5 3/4 in (1.97 m)	312 lb (142 kg)	33 7/8 in (0.86 m)	10 5/8 in (0.27 m)	6 ft 9 1/8 in (2.06 m)	5.25 s	1.85 s	3.02 s	4.81 s	7.60 s	24.0 in (0.61 m)	8 ft 2 in (2.49 m)	26 reps
All values from Pro Day

=== Green Bay Packers ===
After going unselected in the 2022 NFL draft, Moore signed as a free agent with the Green Bay Packers on May 6, 2022. He was later released during training camp on August 18, 2022.

=== Dallas Cowboys ===
On November 9, 2022, Moore signed with the Dallas Cowboys. However, he was released on December 6, 2022.

=== Denver Broncos ===
Moore signed a practice roster agreement with the Denver Broncos on January 4, 2023. However, his contract expired shortly after the conclusion of the 2023 season.

=== Arlington Renegades ===
Moore was selected by the Arlington Renegades in the fourth round of the 2023 XFL supplemental draft. He played in nine games, starting in two, and was part of the 2023 XFL Championship team.

=== Seattle Sea Dragons ===
On June 16, 2023, Moore was traded to the Seattle Sea Dragons in exchange for Tuzar Skipper and a swap of picks in the 2023 XFL rookie draft. However, the Sea Dragons folded when the XFL and United States Football League (USFL) merged to create the United Football League (UFL), terminating his contract with the team.

=== DC Defenders ===
Moore was selected by the DC Defenders in phase 2 of the 2024 UFL dispersal draft on January 8, 2024. He was later released on March 10, 2024.

=== San Antonio Brahmas ===
On April 25, 2024, Moore signed with the San Antonio Brahmas. He was released on May 21, 2024.

=== Toronto Argonauts ===
On July 8, 2024, it was announced that Moore had signed with the Toronto Argonauts to a practice roster agreement. He made his CFL debut in the last game of the regular season on October 25, 2024, against the Edmonton Elks. He returned to the practice roster for the post-season and remained there as the Argonauts defeated the Winnipeg Blue Bombers in the 110th Grey Cup game.

Following the trade of Dejon Allen to the BC Lions, Moore won the starting left tackle spot to begin the 2025 season.
