= Akili Smith Jr. =

American football player

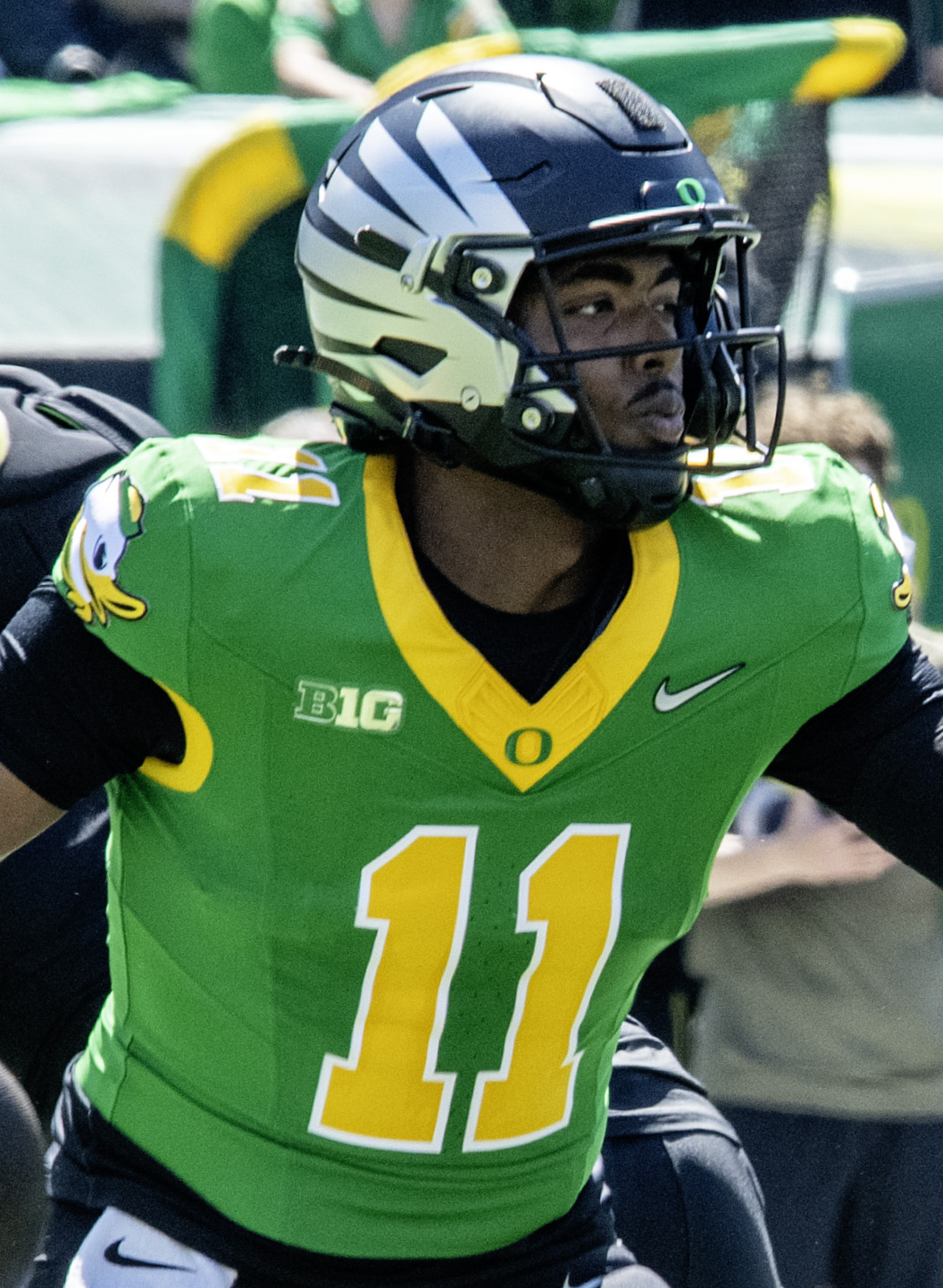
- Smith with Oregon in 2026

No. 15 – Oregon Ducks
- Position: Quarterback
- Class: Redshirt Freshman

Personal information
- Listed height: 6 ft 5 in (1.96 m)
- Listed weight: 231 lb (105 kg)

Career information
- High school: Lincoln (San Diego, California)
- College: Oregon (2025—present)
- Stats at ESPN

Kabisa Akili Maradufu Smith Jr. is an American college football quarterback who plays for the Oregon Ducks.

== Early life ==
Smith lived in San Diego, California and initially attended Vista Murrieta High School. He passed for 2,432 yards with 29 touchdowns and four interceptions as a sophomore. He transferred to Lincoln High School after his sophomore year. He passed 2,431 yards with 25 touchdowns and also rushed for 196 yards and three touchdowns in his first season at Lincoln. Following his junior year, Smith competed in the Elite 11 quarterback competition and was named a finalist. As a senior, he passed for 2,478 yards and 24 touchdowns while rushing for 508 yards and four touchdowns.

Smith is rated a four-star recruit, and committed to play college football at Oregon over offers from Michigan, Florida, Washington, and Colorado.

== College career ==
Smith joined the Oregon Ducks as an early enrollee in December 2024. He redshirted his freshman season. Smith made his college debut in the third game of his redshirt freshman season, completing 2 of 4 pass attempts for 31 yards and rushing twice for seven yards in a 84-0 win over Portland State.

== Personal life ==
Smith is the son of former Oregon Ducks' quarterback and NFL first round draft pick Akili Smith.
