= Kendre Harrison =

American football player

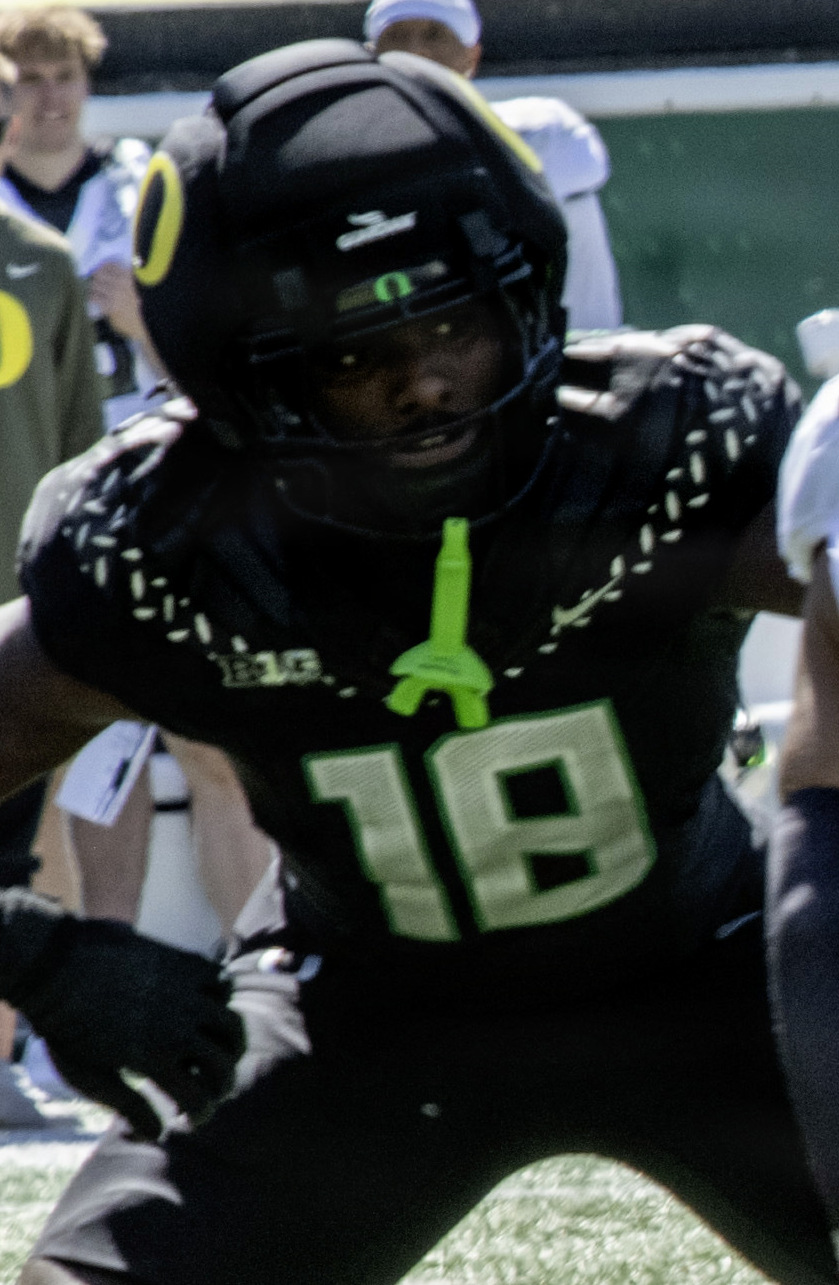
- Harrison in 2026

No. 18 – Oregon Ducks
- Position: Tight end
- Class: Freshman

Personal information
- Born: Reidsville, North Carolina, U.S.
- Listed height: 6 ft 7 in (2.01 m)
- Listed weight: 250 lb (113 kg)

Career information
- High school: Reidsville (Reidsville, North Carolina); Providence Day School (Charlotte, North Carolina)
- College: Oregon (2026–present)

Kendre Harrison is an American college football tight end for the Oregon Ducks. He was a five-star recruit and one of the top prospects in the 2026 recruiting class.

== Early life ==
Harrison was born and raised in Reidsville, North Carolina. He grew up playing football and basketball but said he was not good at either, calling himself a "little fat dude with glasses" until he grew a foot (0.30 m) in seventh grade, going from 5 feet 3 inches (1.60 m) to 6 feet 3 inches (1.91 m). He started playing for an AAU basketball team and he said that "I started training and magically everything started coming to life". In June 2021, while still in middle school, Harrison received his first athletic scholarship offer to play college football, for the Wake Forest Demon Deacons.

== High school ==
Harrison played both football and basketball at Reidsville High School. A tight end and defensive end in football, he caught 17 passes for 263 yards and five touchdowns and made 92 tackles and nine sacks as a freshman, helping Reidsville to a record of 14–2 and a state championship appearance. He also helped the basketball team to a record of 26–1 with a state championship appearance in his freshman year, averaging 21.5 points, 15.1 rebounds and 4.4 blocks per game.

As a sophomore in football, Harrison caught 62 passes for 940 yards and 16 touchdowns and made 76 solo tackles and nine sacks. In his sophomore basketball season, he recorded averages of 19.4 points, 15.1 rebounds and 3.7 blocks per game. He led both teams to state championship wins, while Reidsville's basketball squad had a perfect record of 29–0. For his performances, he was honored as the MaxPreps 2023–24 National Male Athlete of the Year.

Harrison transferred to Providence Day School in Charlotte, North Carolina, for his junior year. He appeared in three games for Providence Day, posting 13 catches for 153 yards and two touchdowns, before deciding to transfer back to Reidsville in September 2024. He scored two touchdowns in his first game back at Reidsville. He finished the season with 33 catches for 555 yards and eight touchdowns in eight football games played, then surpassed 1,000 career points and 1,000 career rebounds during the following basketball season.

A five-star recruit, Harrison is a top prospect in both sports. He is ranked by ESPN as a top-15 prospect nationally in football and the number one tight end prospect, while ranking in the top-40 nationally in basketball. He committed to play both sports in college for the Oregon Ducks.
