= Andrew Olesh =

American football player

- Olesh in 2026

Oregon Ducks
- Position: Tight end
- Class: Redshirt Freshman

Personal information
- Listed height: 6 ft 5 in (1.96 m)
- Listed weight: 226 lb (103 kg)

Career information
- High school: Southern Lehigh (Center Valley, Pennsylvania)
- College: Penn State (2025); Oregon (2026–present)
- Stats at ESPN

Andrew Olesh is an American football tight end for the Oregon Ducks. He previously played for the Penn State Nittany Lions.

== Early life ==
Olesh grew up in Center Valley, Pennsylvania and attended Southern Lehigh High School. He had 53 receptions for 973 yards and ten touchdowns during his junior season. Olesh caught 75 passes for 1,105 yards and ten touchdowns as a senior. He was rated a four-star recruit and initially committed to play college football at Michigan over offers Alabama, Florida, and Penn State. Olesh later decommitted and flipped his commitment to Penn State.

== College career ==
Olesh began his college football career at Penn State. He joined the Nittany Lions as an early enrollee in January 2025 and redshirted his true freshman season. After the 2025 season, Olesh entered the NCAA transfer portal.

Olesh transferred to Oregon.
