= Dakorien Moore =

American football player (born 2007)

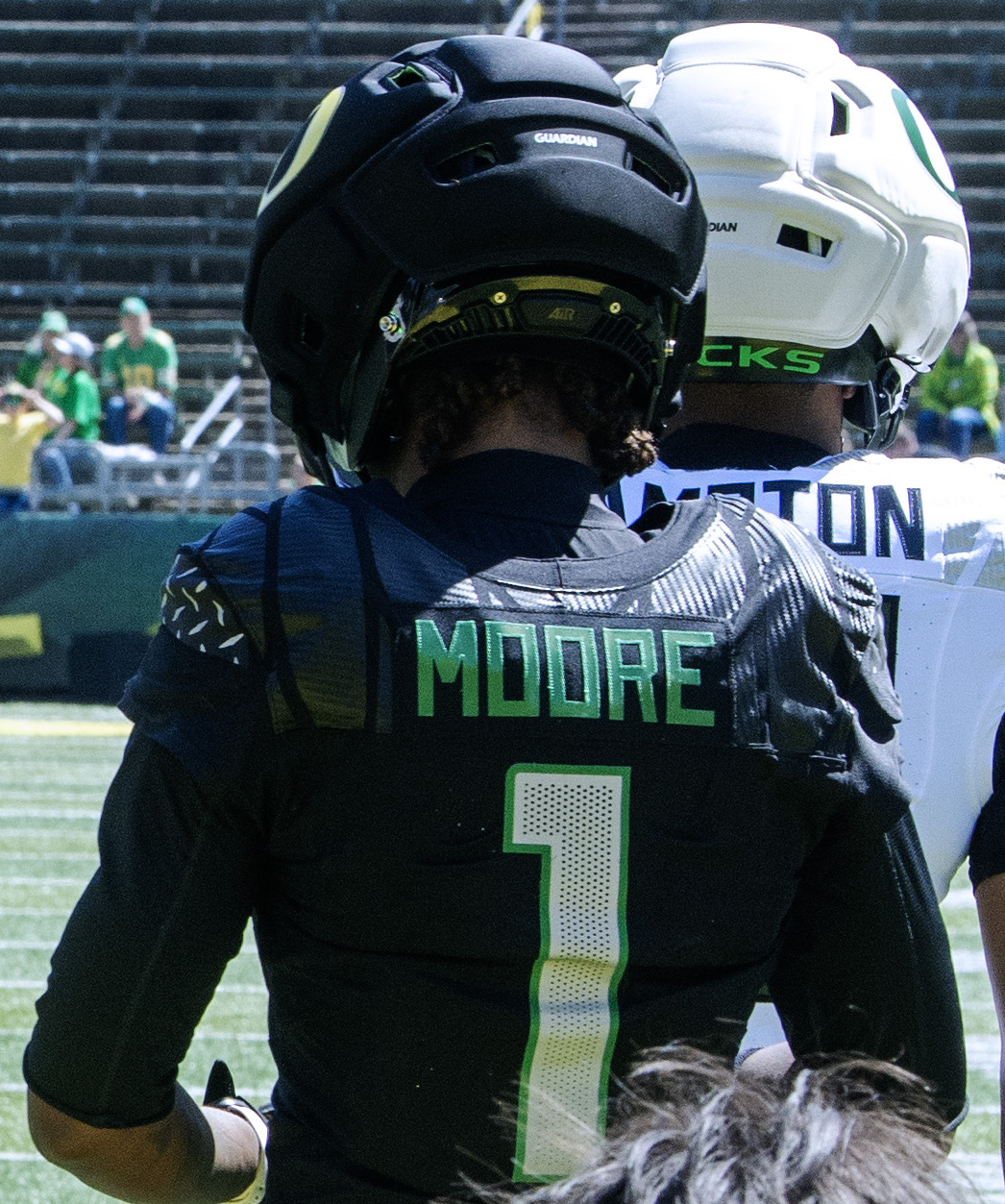
- Moore in 2026

No. 1 – Oregon Ducks
- Position: Wide receiver
- Class: Sophomore

Personal information
- Born: January 20, 2007 (age 19); Dallas, Texas
- Listed height: 5 ft 11 in (1.80 m)
- Listed weight: 195 lb (88 kg)

Career information
- High school: Duncanville (Duncanville, Texas)
- College: Oregon (2025–present)
- Stats at ESPN

Dakorien Moore (born January 20, 2007) is an American college football wide receiver for the Oregon Ducks of the Big Ten Conference. He was the top ranked wide receiver in the 2025 recruiting class.

== Early life ==
Moore grew up in Dallas, Texas and attended Duncanville High School. He had 44 receptions for 764 yards and six touchdowns during his sophomore season. As a junior, Moore caught 71 passes for 1,523 yards and 18 touchdowns. He also competes in track & field and was part of Duncanville's 4 × 200 metres relay team that set a national high school record alongside LSU running back Caden Durham.

Moore was rated a five-star recruit and was the consensus top wide receiver prospect in the 2025 class. He initially committed to play college football at LSU before the start of his junior year. Moore later decommitted at the end of his junior year. He ultimately flipped his commitment to Oregon after considering Ohio State, Texas, and LSU.
