= Evan Stewart (American football) =

American football player (born 2003)

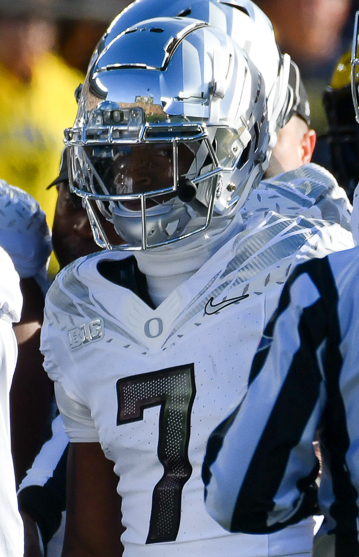
- Stewart with the Oregon Ducks in 2024

No. 7 – Oregon Ducks
- Position: Wide receiver
- Class: Redshirt Senior

Personal information
- Born: September 4, 2003 (age 23); Memphis, Tennessee, U.S.
- Listed height: 6 ft 0 in (1.83 m)
- Listed weight: 175 lb (79 kg)

Career information
- High school: Liberty (Frisco, Texas)
- College: Texas A&M (2022–2023); Oregon (2024–present)
- Stats at ESPN

Evan Fitzgerald Stewart (born September 4, 2003) is an American college football wide receiver for the Oregon Ducks. He previously played for the Texas A&M Aggies.

== Early life ==
Stewart grew up in Frisco, Texas and attended Liberty High School. He had 46 receptions for 913 yards and nine touchdowns in his junior season. Stewart was rated a four-star recruit and initially committed to play college football at Texas during his junior year over offers from Alabama, Auburn, Florida, Florida State, Georgia, LSU, Michigan, Oklahoma, Oregon, and Texas A&M. He decommitted from the school one month later and re-opened his recruitment. Stewart opted out of his senior season, only having played in three games and caught 19 passes 414 yards and three touchdowns. During his senior season, Stewart was re-rated as a five-star prospect and committed to Texas A&M during November of his senior year before signing a National Letter of Intent with the team in December. He played in the 2022 Under Armour All-America Game. Stewart also was a member of the track and field team and won the Texas 5A long jump championship and placed second in the triple jump as a junior.

== College career ==
=== Texas A&M ===
Stewart joined the Texas A&M Aggies as an early enrollee in January 2022 and participated in spring practices.

On December 19, 2023, Stewart announced that he would be entering the NCAA transfer portal.

=== Oregon ===
On January 11, 2024, Stewart announced his intention to transfer to Oregon.
