= 2026 McNeese Cowboys football team =

American college football season

2026 McNeese Cowboys football
- Conference: Southland Conference
- Record: 5–7 (4–5 SLC)
- Head coach: Matt Viator (12th season)
- Offensive coordinator: Tyler Bolfing (2nd season)
- Co-offensive coordinator: Kyle Segler (2nd season)
- Defensive coordinator: Tony Pecoraro (5th season)
- Home stadium: Navarre Stadium

2026 Southland Conference football standings
	Conf.			Overall
Team	W		L	W		L
No. 4 Lamar +^	8	–	1	10	–	2
No. 5 Stephen F. Austin +	8	–	1	11	–	1
No. 21 Incarnate Word	7	–	2	8	–	4
UT Rio Grande Valley	4	–	5	6	–	6
Southeastern Louisiana	4	–	5	6	–	6
Houston Christian	4	–	5	5	–	7
McNeese	4	–	5	5	–	7
Nicholls	3	–	6	4	–	8
East Texas A&M	3	–	6	3	–	9
Northwestern State	0	–	9	0	–	12
+ – Conference co-champions; ^ – FCS playoff participant; As of November 22, 2026; Rankings from STATS Poll

The 2026 McNeese Cowboys football team will represent McNeese State University as a member of the Southland Conference (SLC) during the 2026 NCAA Division I FCS football season. The Cowboys will be led by twelfth-year head coach Matt Viator and will play their home games at Navarre Stadium in Lake Charles, Louisiana.

== Schedule ==
Date	Time	Opponent	Site	TV	Result	Attendance
August 29	6:00 p.m.	No. 13 Stephen F. Austin	Navarre Stadium; Lake Charles, LA	ESPN+	L 27–38	10,680
September 5	6:00 p.m.	Texas Wesleyan*	Navarre Stadium; Lake Charles, LA	ESPN+	W 52–0	8,119
September 12	7:00 p.m.	No. 4 Tarleton State*	Navarre Stadium; Lake Charles, LA	ESPN+	L 24–27	9,202
September 19	7:00 p.m.	at UT Rio Grande Valley	Robert and Janet Vackar Stadium; Edinburg, TX	ESPN+	L 10–27	13,492
September 26	6:00 p.m.	East Texas A&M	Navarre Stadium; Lake Charles, LA	ESPN+	W 27–24	8,580
October 3	6:45 p.m.	at No. 11 (FBS) LSU*	Tiger Stadium; Baton Rouge, LA	SECN	L 14–63	102,321
October 17	12:00 p.m.	at Northwestern State	Harry Turpin Stadium; Natchitoches, LA (rivalry)	ESPN+	W 24–21	2,341
October 24	4:00 p.m.	at Incarnate Word	Gayle and Tom Benson Stadium; San Antonio, TX	ESPN+	L 6–38	2,501
October 31	2:00 p.m.	Nicholls^{†}	Navarre Stadium; Lake Charles, LA	ESPN+	W 16–3	3,050
November 7	4:00 p.m.	at Houston Christian	Husky Stadium; Houston, TX	ESPN+	W 10–0	1,504
November 14	6:00 p.m.	at Southeastern Louisiana	Strawberry Stadium; Hammond, LA	ESPN+	L 17–21	5,012
November 21	6:00 p.m.	No. 4 Lamar	Navarre Stadium; Lake Charles, LA (Battle of the Border)	ESPN+	L 17–19	9,720
*Non-conference game; ^{†}Homecoming; Rankings from STATS Poll released prior to the game; All times are in Central time

== Game summaries ==
=== No. 13 Stephen F. Austin ===
No. 13 Stephen F. Austin Lumberjacks (0–0) at McNeese Cowboys (0–0) – Game summary

Quarter	1	2	3	4	Total
No. 13 Lumberjacks	10	14	14	0	38
Cowboys	7	0	6	14	27

at Navarre Stadium • Lake Charles, Louisiana

- Date: August 29
- Game time: 6 p.m.
- Game weather: Sunny • Temperature: 90 °F (32 °C) • Wind: S 10 mph
- Game attendance: 10,680
- Referee: James Brookhart
- TV announcers (ESPN+): Chaston Tavarees (play-by-play), Cody Stroud (analyst) and Lexi Arabie (sideline)

Game information

First quarter

- MCN – Elisha Edwards 45-yard pass from Jake Strong (Deaglan Camron kick), 12:19. Cowboys 7–0. Drive: 5 plays, 75 yards, 2:41.
- SFA – Bugs Mortimer 37-yard pass from Gavin Rutherford (Carlos Alvarado kick), 11:05. Tied 7–7. Drive: 4 plays, 82 yards, 1:14.
- SFA – Carlos Alvarado 31-yard field goal, 5:59. Lumberjacks 10–7. Drive: 8 plays, 7 yards, 4:20.

Second quarter

- SFA – Jaylen Jenkins 1-yard run (Carlos Alvarado kick), 11:29. Lumberjacks 17–7. Drive: 7 plays, 68 yards, 3:23.
- SFA – Makai Frisby 35-yard interception return (Carlos Alvarado kick), 5:27. Lumberjacks 24–7.

Third quarter

- SFA – Clayton Wayland 35-yard pass from Gavin Rutherford (Carlos Alvarado kick), 12:10. Lumberjacks 31–7. Drive: 3 plays, 21 yards, 1:09.
- MCN – Omiri Wiggins 75-yard run (Deaglan Camron kick BLOCKED), 11:08. Lumberjacks 31–13. Drive: 3 plays, 75 yards, 1:02.
- SFA – Stetson Sarratt 33-yard pass from Gavin Rutherford (Carlos Alvarado kick), 0:25. Lumberjacks 38–13. Drive: 7 plays, 65 yards, 1:59.

Fourth quarter

- MCN – Omiri Wiggins 7-yard pass from Devin Lippold (Deaglan Camron kick), 12:45. Lumberjacks 38–20. Drive: 8 plays, 75 yards, 2:40.
- MCN – Devin Lippold 1-yard run (Deaglan Camron kick), 8:37. Lumberjacks 38–27. Drive: 7 plays, 57 yards, 2:31.

Statistics	SFA	MCN
First downs	23	18
Plays–yards	68–439	65–407
Rushes–yards	39–137	33–199
Passing yards	302	208
Passing: comp–att–int	18–29–2	19–32–2
Turnovers	3	3
Time of possession	31:47	28:13

Team	Category	Player	Statistics
Stephen F. Austin	Passing	Gavin Rutherford	18/29, 302 yards, 3 TD, 2 INT
Stephen F. Austin	Rushing	Jaylen Jenkins	19 carries, 82 yards, TD
Stephen F. Austin	Receiving	Bugs Mortimer	2 receptions, 72 yards, TD
McNeese	Passing	Devin Lippold	10/18, 118 yards, TD, INT
McNeese	Rushing	Omiri Wiggins	12 carries, 126 yards, TD
McNeese	Receiving	Curtis Deville	4 receptions, 71 yards

=== Texas Wesleyan (NAIA) ===
Texas Wesleyan Rams (NAIA) (0–0) at McNeese Cowboys (0–1) – Game summary

Quarter	1	2	3	4	Total
Rams (NAIA)	0	0	0	0	0
Cowboys	7	17	14	14	52

at Navarre Stadium • Lake Charles, Louisiana

- Date: September 5
- Game time: 6:00 p.m. CDT
- Game weather: Cloudy • Temperature: 79 °F (26 °C) • Wind: SW 6 mph
- Game attendance: 8,119
- Referee: Rex Rose
- TV announcers (ESPN+): Chaston Tavarees (play-by-play), Cody Stroud (analyst) and Lexi Arabie (sideline)

Game information

First quarter

- MCN – Solo Lewis 22-yard pass from Devin Lippold (Deaglan Camron kick), 4:14. Cowboys 7–0. Drive: 6 plays, 81 yards, 3:21.

Second quarter

- MCN – Safir Stills-Bey 70-yard blocked field goal return (Deaglan Camron kick), 11:48. Cowboys 14–0.
- MCN – Curtis Deville 10-yard pass from Devin Lippold (Deaglan Camron kick), 5:28. Cowboys 21–0. Drive: 6 plays, 55 yards, 2:20.
- MCN – Deaglan Camron 41-yard field goal, 1:49. Cowboys 24–0. Drive: 7 plays, 17 yards, 1:48.

Third quarter

- MCN – Elisha Edwards 8-yard pass from Devin Lippold (Deaglan Camron kick), 10:52. Cowboys 31–0. Drive: 9 plays, 59 yards, 3:58.
- MCN – Elisha Edwards 36-yard pass from Devin Lippold (Deaglan Camron kick), 8:38. Cowboys 38–0. Drive: 2 plays, 41 yards, 0:38.

Fourth quarter

- MCN – Wyatt Fontenot 46-yard pass from Brady Barrier (Brettson Booker kick), 12:09. Cowboys 45–0. Drive: 4 plays, 85 yards, 1:50.
- MCN – Marquez Davis 13-yard run (Brettson Booker kick), 4:07. Cowboys 52–0. Drive: 11 plays, 67 yards, 6:26.

Statistics	TWES	MCN
First downs	14	23
Plays–yards	63–187	66–500
Rushes–yards	30–74	37–220
Passing yards	113	280
Passing: comp–att–int	14–33–1	20–29–0
Turnovers	1	0
Time of possession	29:22	30:38

Team	Category	Player	Statistics
Texas Wesleyan	Passing	Charlie Adamoli	14/33, 113 yards, INT
Texas Wesleyan	Rushing	Maurice Griffin	8 carries, 27 yards
Texas Wesleyan	Receiving	Mahki Whitney	6 receptions, 67 yards
McNeese	Passing	Devin Lippold	15/20, 199 yards, 4 TD
McNeese	Rushing	Marquez Davis	9 carries, 67 yards, TD
McNeese	Receiving	Elisha Edwards	5 receptions, 77 yards, 2 TD

=== No. 4 Tarleton State ===
No. 4 Tarleton State Texans (2–0) at McNeese Cowboys (1–1) – Game summary

Quarter	1	2	3	4	Total
No. 4 Texans	7	7	7	6	27
Cowboys	7	0	17	0	24

at Navarre Stadium • Lake Charles, Louisiana

- Date: September 12
- Game time: 6:00 p.m.
- Game weather: Sunny • Temperature: 81 °F (27 °C) • Wind: SW 10 mph
- Game attendance: 9,202
- Referee: Gary Leeper
- TV announcers (ESPN+): Chaston Tavarees (play-by-play), Cody Stroud (analyst) and Lexi Arabie (sideline)

Game information

First quarter

- (7:59) MCN – Omiri Wiggins 13-yard run, Deaglan Camron kick (Drive: 12 plays, 97 yards, 5:52; McNeese 7–0)
- (3:31) TAR – Kaden Anderson 8-yard run, Alejandro De La Poza kick (Drive: 12 plays, 75 yards, 4:28; Tied 7–7)

Second quarter

- (12:45) TAR – Tylan Hines 13-yard run, Alejandro De La Poza kick (Drive: 6 plays, 84 yards, 2:29; Tarleton State 14–7)

Third quarter

- (7:33) MCN – Curtis Deville Jr. 7-yard pass from Devin Lippold, Deaglan Camron kick (Drive: 6 plays, 70 yards, 2:33; Tied 14–14)
- (6:17) TAR – Tylan Hines 46-yard run, Alejandro De La Poza kick (Drive: 4 plays, 55 yards, 1:07; Tarleton State 21–14)
- (4:40) MCN – Curtis Deville Jr. 47-yard pass from Devin Lippold, Deaglan Camron kick (Drive: 4 plays, 85 yards, 1:30; Tied 21–21)
- (0:16) MCN – Deaglan Camron 37-yard field goal (Drive: 6 plays, 59 yards, 2:25; McNeese 24–21)

Fourth quarter

- (12:10) TAR – Alejandro De La Poza 24-yard field goal (Drive: 10 plays, 66 yards, 2:59; Tied 24–24)
- (0:00) TAR – Alejandro De La Poza 24-yard field goal (Drive: 16 plays, 80 yards, 3:48; Tarleton State 27–24)

Statistics	TAR	MCN
First downs	26	24
Plays–yards	70–509	76–495
Rushes–yards	22–146	31–209
Passing yards	363	286
Passing: comp–att–int	28–48–0	27–45–0
Turnovers	0	0
Time of possession	24:50	35:10

Team	Category	Player	Statistics
Tarleton State	Passing	Kaden Anderson	28/48, 363 yards
Tarleton State	Rushing	Tylan Hines	17 carries, 141 yards, 2 TD
Tarleton State	Receiving	Marquis Willis	10 receptions, 166 yards
McNeese	Passing	Devin Lippold	27/45, 286 yards, 2 TD
McNeese	Rushing	Omiri Wiggins	15 carries, 81 yards, TD
McNeese	Receiving	Elisha Edwards	8 receptions, 111 yards

=== at UT Rio Grande Valley ===
McNeese Cowboys (1–2) at UT Rio Grande Valley Vaqueros (1–2) – Game summary

Quarter	1	2	3	4	Total
Cowboys	0	3	0	7	10
Vaqueros	7	10	7	3	27

at Robert and Janet Vackar Stadium • Edinburg, Texas

- Date: September 19
- Game time: 7:00 p.m.
- Game weather: Sunny
- Game attendance: 13,492
- Referee: Gary Leeper
- TV announcers (ESPN+): Mark May (play-by-play), Aaron Saenz (analyst) and Jaeda Rael (sideline)

Game information

First quarter

- (0:42) RGV – Kyran Lee 4-yard pass from Aidan Jakobsohn, Brysen Gardner kick (Drive: 7 plays, 76 yards, 2:52; UT Rio Grande Valley 7–0)

Second quarter

- (9:38) RGV – Aidan Jakobsohn 7-yard run, Brysen Gardner kick (Drive: 9 plays, 77 yards, 4:40; UT Rio Grande Valley 14–0)
- (4:59) MCN – Deaglan Camron 28-yard field goal (Drive: 12 plays, 64 yards, 4:49; UT Rio Grande Valley 14–3)
- (0:45) RGV – Brysen Gardner 28-yard field goal (Drive: 10 plays, 74 yards, 4:07; UT Rio Grande Valley 17–3)

Third quarter

- (0:10) RGV – Aidan Jakobsohn 3-yard run, Brysen Gardner kick (Drive: 6 plays, 62 yards, 2:41; UT Rio Grande Valley 24–3)

Fourth quarter

- (14:08) MCN – Curtis Deville Jr. 39-yard pass from Devin Lippold, Deaglan Camron kick (Drive: 3 plays, 75 yards, 1:02; UT Rio Grande Valley 24–10)
- (1:55) RGV – Brysen Gardner 23-yard field goal (Drive: 10 plays, 80 yards, 6:31; UT Rio Grande Valley 27–10)

Statistics	MCN	RGV
First downs	18	26
Plays–yards	62–279	69–488
Rushes–yards	28–109	41–315
Passing yards	170	173
Passing: comp–att–int	14–34–3	13–28–1
Turnovers	4	1
Time of possession	26:23	33:37

Team	Category	Player	Statistics
McNeese	Passing	Devin Lippold	12/29, 141 yards, TD, 2 INT
McNeese	Rushing	Devin Lippold	9 carries, 45 yards
McNeese	Receiving	Curtis Deville Jr.	3 receptions, 71 yards, TD
UT Rio Grande Valley	Passing	Aidan Jakobsohn	10/20, 137 yards, TD, INT
UT Rio Grande Valley	Rushing	TJ Dement	13 carries, 144 yards
UT Rio Grande Valley	Receiving	Jaydon Smith	4 receptions, 81 yards

=== East Texas A&M ===
East Texas A&M Lions (1–3) at McNeese Cowboys (1–3) – Game summary

Quarter	1	2	3	4	Total
Lions	0	0	0	0	0
Cowboys	0	0	0	0	0

at Navarre Stadium • Lake Charles, Louisiana

- Date: September 26
- Game time: 6:00 p.m.
- TV: ESPN+

Game information

First quarter
Second quarter
Third quarter
Fourth quarter

Statistics	ETAM	MCN
First downs		
Plays–yards		
Rushes–yards		
Passing yards		
Passing: comp–att–int		
Turnovers		
Time of possession		

Team	Category	Player	Statistics
East Texas A&M	Passing		
East Texas A&M	Rushing		
East Texas A&M	Receiving		
McNeese	Passing		
McNeese	Rushing		
McNeese	Receiving		

=== at No. 11 (FBS) LSU ===
McNeese Cowboys (2–3) at No. 11 (FBS) LSU Tigers (3–1) – Game summary

Quarter	1	2	3	4	Total
Cowboys	0	0	14	0	14
No. 11 (FBS) Tigers	14	21	14	14	63

at Tiger Stadium • Baton Rouge, Louisiana

- Date: October 3
- Game time: 6:45 p.m.
- Game weather: Cloudy • Temperature: 81 °F (27 °C) • Wind: E at 8 miles per hour (13 km/h)
- Game attendance: 102,321
- Referee: Kyle Olson
- TV announcers (SECN): Dave Neal (play-by-play), Cole Cubelic (analyst), and Tori Petry (sideline reporter)

Game information

First quarter

- (9:23) - LSU - Dilin Jones 1-yard run (Scott Starzyk kick) (Drive: 9 plays, 48 yards, 3:04); Tigers 7-0
- (3:18) - LSU - Roman Mothershed 1-yard pass from Sam Leavitt (Scott Starzyk kick) (Drive: 12 plays, 77 yards, 4:48); Tigers 14-0

Second quarter

- (7:37) - LSU - Landen Clark 3-yard run (Scott Starzyk kick) (Drive: 10 plays, 47 yards, 4:11); Tigers 21-0
- (4:01) - LSU - Corey Barber Jr. 6-yard pass from Sam Leavitt (Scott Starzyk kick) (Drive: 7 plays, 65 yards, 2:37); Tigers 28-0
- (0:57) - LSU - Corey Barber Jr. 12-yard pass from Sam Leavitt (Scott Starzyk kick) (Drive: 4 plays, 62 yards, 1:37); Tigers 35-0

Third quarter

- (11:34) - LSU - Deuce Geralds 1-yard run (Scott Starzyk kick) (Drive: 10 plays, 81 yards, 3:19); Tigers 42-0
- (8:22) - LSU - Harlem Berry 11-yard run (Scott Starzyk kick) (Drive: 4 plays, 64 yards, 1:20); Tigers 49-0
- (4:48) - MCN - Jamaal Levi 43-yard pass from Brady Barrier (Deaglan Cameron kick) (Drive: 1 play, 43 yards, 0:10); Tigers 49-7
- (3:32) - MCN - Jamaal Levi 64-yard run (Deaglan Cameron kick) (Drive: 2 plays, 67 yards, 0:48); Tigers 49-14

Fourth quarter

- (13:56) - LSU - Stacy Gage 46-yard run (Scott Starzyk kick) (Drive: 4 plays, 70 yards, 1:04); Tigers 56-14
- (10:55) - LSU - Stacy Gage 39-yard run (Scott Starzyk kick) (Drive: 4 plays, 72 yards, 1:09); Tigers 63-14

Statistics	MCN	LSU
First downs	6	39
Plays–yards	47–196	101–731
Rushes–yards	30–102	53–366
Passing yards	94	365
Passing: comp–att–int	8–17–1	31–48–1
Turnovers	1	1
Time of possession	22:47	37:13

Team	Category	Player	Statistics
McNeese	Passing	Brady Barrier	5/7, 74 yards, TD
McNeese	Rushing	Jamaal Levi	1 carry, 64 yards, TD
McNeese	Receiving	Jamaal Levi	2 receptions, 46 yards, TD
LSU	Passing	Sam Leavitt	18/23, 177 yards, 3 TD, INT
LSU	Rushing	Harlem Berry	15 carries, 125 yards, TD
LSU	Receiving	Corey Barber Jr.	7 receptions, 83 yards, 2 TD

=== at Northwestern State (rivalry) ===
McNeese Cowboys (2–4) at Northwestern State Demons (0–6) – Game summary

Quarter	1	2	3	4	Total
Cowboys	0	0	0	0	0
Demons	0	0	0	0	0

at Harry Turpin Stadium • Natchitoches, Louisiana

- Date: October 17
- Game time: 12:00 p.m.

Game information

First quarter
Second quarter
Third quarter
Fourth quarter

Statistics	MCN	NWST
First downs		
Plays–yards		
Rushes–yards		
Passing yards		
Passing: comp–att–int		
Turnovers		
Time of possession		

Team	Category	Player	Statistics
McNeese	Passing		
McNeese	Rushing		
McNeese	Receiving		
Northwestern State	Passing		
Northwestern State	Rushing		
Northwestern State	Receiving		

=== at Incarnate Word ===
McNeese Cowboys (3–4) at Incarnate Word Cardinals (3–4) – Game summary

Quarter	1	2	3	4	Total
Cowboys	0	6	0	0	6
Cardinals	7	21	0	10	38

at Gayle and Tom Benson Stadium • San Antonio, Texas

- Date: October 24
- Game time: 4:00 p.m.
- Game weather: Cloudy • Temperature: 84 °F (29 °C) • Wind: SE at 11 miles per hour (18 km/h)
- Game attendance: 2,501
- Referee: Austin Mezzacasa
- TV: ESPN+

Game information

First quarter

- UIW – 14:24 Dane Farley 27 yard pass from Emmett Brown, Nick Rigas kick
  UIW 7–0 Drive: 1 play, 27 yards, 0:08

Second quarter

- UIW – 2:05 Roy Alexander 29 yard pass from Emmett Brown, Nick Rigas kick
  UIW 14–0 Drive: 8 plays, 72 yards, 2:53
- UIW – 1:31 Jacob Emmers 56 yard pass from Emmett Brown, Nick Rigas kick
  UIW 21–0 Drive: 1 play, 56 yards, 0:07
- MCN – 0:59 Reed Boyd 31 yard pass from Brady Barrier, Hutch Swilley rush attempt failed
  UIW 21–6 Drive: 2 plays, 75 yards, 0:32
- UIW – 0:05 Isaiah Champagne 26 yard pass from Emmett Brown, Nick Rigas kick
  UIW 28–6 Drive: 6 plays, 75 yards, 0:54

Fourth quarter

- UIW – 13:36 Emmett Brown 38 yard run, Nick Rigas kick
  UIW 35–6 Drive: 6 plays, 72 yards, 3:00
- UIW – 7:50 Nick Rigas 25 yard field goal
  UIW 38–6 Drive: 9 plays, 36 yards, 4:11

Statistics	MCN	UIW
First downs	13	26
Plays–yards	66–283	70–513
Rushes–yards	39–160	43–226
Passing yards	123	287
Passing: comp–att–int	12–27–1	20–27–0
Turnovers	2	0
Time of possession	28:20	31:40

Team	Category	Player	Statistics
McNeese	Passing	Brady Barrier	10/17, 127 yards, TD, INT
McNeese	Rushing	Marquez Davis	7 carries, 63 yards
McNeese	Receiving	Elisha Edwards	3 receptions, 48 yards
Incarnate Word	Passing	Emmett Brown	19/26, 283 yards, 4 TD
Incarnate Word	Rushing	Emmett Brown	10 carries, 72 yards, TD
Incarnate Word	Receiving	Roy Alexander	3 receptions, 67 yards, TD

=== Nicholls ===
Nicholls Colonels (3–5) at McNeese Cowboys (3–5) – Game summary

Quarter	1	2	3	4	Total
Colonels	0	0	0	0	0
Cowboys	0	0	0	0	0

at Navarre Stadium • Lake Charles, Louisiana

- Date: October 31

Game information

First quarter
Second quarter
Third quarter
Fourth quarter

Statistics	NICH	MCN
First downs		
Plays–yards		
Rushes–yards		
Passing yards		
Passing: comp–att–int		
Turnovers		
Time of possession		

Team	Category	Player	Statistics
Nicholls	Passing		
Nicholls	Rushing		
Nicholls	Receiving		
McNeese	Passing		
McNeese	Rushing		
McNeese	Receiving		

=== at Houston Christian ===
McNeese Cowboys (4–5) at Houston Christian Huskies (4–5) – Game summary

Quarter	1	2	3	4	Total
Cowboys	0	0	0	0	0
Huskies	0	0	0	0	0

at Husky Stadium • Houston, Texas

- Date: November 7
- Game time: 4:00 p.m.

Game information

First quarter
Second quarter
Third quarter
Fourth quarter

Statistics	MCN	HCU
First downs		
Plays–yards		
Rushes–yards		
Passing yards		
Passing: comp–att–int		
Turnovers		
Time of possession		

Team	Category	Player	Statistics
McNeese	Passing		
McNeese	Rushing		
McNeese	Receiving		
Houston Christian	Passing		
Houston Christian	Rushing		
Houston Christian	Receiving		

=== at Southeastern Louisiana ===
McNeese Cowboys (5–5) at Southeastern Louisiana Lions (4–6) – Game summary

Quarter	1	2	3	4	Total
Cowboys	0	0	0	0	0
Lions	0	0	0	0	0

at Strawberry Stadium • Hammond, Louisiana

- Date: November 14

Game information

First quarter
Second quarter
Third quarter
Fourth quarter

Statistics	MCN	SELA
First downs		
Plays–yards		
Rushes–yards		
Passing yards		
Passing: comp–att–int		
Turnovers		
Time of possession		

Team	Category	Player	Statistics
McNeese	Passing		
McNeese	Rushing		
McNeese	Receiving		
Southeastern Louisiana	Passing		
Southeastern Louisiana	Rushing		
Southeastern Louisiana	Receiving		

=== No. 4 Lamar (Battle of the Border) ===
No. 4 Lamar Cardinals (9–2) at McNeese Cowboys (5–6) – Game summary

Quarter	1	2	3	4	Total
No. 4 Cardinals	0	0	0	0	0
Cowboys	0	0	0	0	0

at Navarre Stadium • Lake Charles, Louisiana

- Date: November 21

Game information

First quarter
Second quarter
Third quarter
Fourth quarter

Statistics	LAM	MCN
First downs		
Plays–yards		
Rushes–yards		
Passing yards		
Passing: comp–att–int		
Turnovers		
Time of possession		

Team	Category	Player	Statistics
Lamar	Passing		
Lamar	Rushing		
Lamar	Receiving		
McNeese	Passing		
McNeese	Rushing		
McNeese	Receiving		

== Rankings ==
Ranking movements Legend: — = Not ranked RV = Received votes
	Week														
Poll	Pre	1	2	3	4	5	6	7	8	9	10	11	12	13	Final
STATS	—														
Coaches	RV														
