= 2026 Lamar Cardinals football team =

American college football season

2026 Lamar Cardinals football

Southland co-champion

FCS Playoffs
- Conference: Southland Conference

Ranking
- STATS: No. 4
- FCS Coaches: No. 5
- Record: 10–2 (8–1 SLC)
- Head coach: Peter Rossomando (4th season)
- Offensive coordinator: Andrew Sparano (1st season)
- Defensive coordinator: Drew Christ (4th season)
- Home stadium: Provost Umphrey Stadium

2026 Southland Conference football standings
	Conf.			Overall
Team	W		L	W		L
No. 4 Lamar +^	8	–	1	10	–	2
No. 5 Stephen F. Austin +	8	–	1	11	–	1
No. 21 Incarnate Word	7	–	2	8	–	4
UT Rio Grande Valley	4	–	5	6	–	6
Southeastern Louisiana	4	–	5	6	–	6
Houston Christian	4	–	5	5	–	7
McNeese	4	–	5	5	–	7
Nicholls	3	–	6	4	–	8
East Texas A&M	3	–	6	3	–	9
Northwestern State	0	–	9	0	–	12
+ – Conference co-champions; ^ – FCS playoff participant; As of November 22, 2026; Rankings from STATS Poll

The 2026 Lamar Cardinals football team will represent Lamar University as a member of the Southland Conference (SLC) during the 2026 NCAA Division I FCS football season. The Cardinals will be led by fourth-year head coach Peter Rossomando and will play their home games at Provost Umphrey Stadium in Beaumont, Texas.

== Schedule ==
Date	Time	Opponent	Rank	Site	TV	Result	Attendance
August 29	6:00 p.m.	No. 15 Abilene Christian*	No. 20	Provost Umphrey Stadium; Beaumont, TX	ESPN+	W 21–14	7,233
September 5	7:00 p.m.	at Louisiana*	No. 14	Cajun Field; Lafayette, LA (Sabine Shoe)	ESPN+	L 7–38	20,851
September 12	3:00 p.m.	at Idaho*	No. 14	Kibbie Dome; Moscow, ID	ESPN+	W 23–17	9,015
September 26	3:00 p.m.	at Nicholls	No. 15	Manning Field at John L. Guidry Stadium; Thibodaux, LA	ESPN+	W 49–18	5,477
October 3	6:00 p.m.	Northwestern State^{†}	No. 14	Provost Umphrey Stadium; Beaumont, TX	ESPN+	W 42–14	7,526
October 10	3:00 p.m.	Incarnate Word	No. 11	Provost Umphrey Stadium; Beaumont, TX	ESPN+	W 38–35	6,824
October 17	4:00 p.m.	at Southeastern Louisiana	No. 10	Strawberry Stadium; Hammond, LA	ESPN+	L 31–34	6,673
October 24	3:00 p.m.	Houston Christian	No. 16	Provost Umphrey Stadium; Beaumont, TX	ESPN+	W 35–10	8,190
October 31	7:00 p.m.	at UT Rio Grande Valley	No. 15	Robert and Janet Vackar Stadium; Edinburg, TX	ESPN+	W 52–23	10,631
November 7	3:00 p.m.	No. 2 Stephen F. Austin	No. 13	Provost Umphrey Stadium; Beaumont, TX	ESPN+	W 45–28	11,126
November 14	3:00 p.m.	East Texas A&M	No. 7т	Provost Umphrey Stadium; Beaumont, TX	ESPN+	W 45–26	8,133
November 21	6:00 p.m.	at McNeese	No. 4	Navarre Stadium; Lake Charles, LA (Battle of the Border)	ESPN+	W 19–17	9,720
*Non-conference game; ^{†}Homecoming; Rankings from STATS Poll released prior to the game; All times are in Central time

== Game summaries ==
=== No. 15 Abilene Christian ===
No. 15 Abilene Christian Wildcats (0–0) at No. 20 Lamar Cardinals (0–0) – Game summary

Quarter	1	2	3	4	Total
No. 15 Wildcats	0	7	0	7	14
No. 20 Cardinals	7	7	0	7	21

at Provost Umphrey Stadium • Beaumont, Texas

- Date: August 29
- Game time: 7 p.m.
- Game weather: Sunny • Temperature: 90 °F (32 °C) • Wind: S at 7 miles per hour (11 km/h)
- Game attendance: 7,233
- Referee: Austin Mezzacasa
- TV: ESPN+

Game information

First quarter

- LAM – Davin Driskell 5-yard pass from Aiden McCown (Andres Sandoval kick), 7:36. Cardinals 7–0. Drive: 10 plays, 72 yards, 5:53.

Second quarter

- ACU – Romelo Boykin 8-yard pass from John David Black (Brandon Perez kick), 1:54. Tied 7–7. Drive: 13 plays, 77 yards, 6:46.
- LAM – Blake Thomas 33-yard pass from Aiden McCown (Andres Sandoval kick), 0:13. Cardinals 14–7. Drive: 6 plays, 75 yards, 1:41.

Third quarter

- No scoring plays.

Fourth quarter

- LAM – Davin Driskell 5-yard pass from Aiden McCown (Andres Sandoval kick), 14:53. Cardinals 21–7. Drive: 14 plays, 65 yards, 7:40.
- ACU – Cristian Driver 4-yard pass from John David Black (Brandon Perez kick), 3:58. Cardinals 21–14. Drive: 7 plays, 79 yards, 3:12.

Statistics	ACU	LAM
First downs	17	17
Plays–yards	62–358	66–278
Rushes–yards	29–151	34–95
Passing yards	207	183
Passing: comp–att–int	19–33–2	17–32–0
Turnovers	2	0
Time of possession	28:21	31:39

Team	Category	Player	Statistics
Abilene Christian	Passing	John David Black	15/25, 142 yards, 2 TD
Abilene Christian	Rushing	Alex Broome	14 carries, 75 yards
Abilene Christian	Receiving	Cristian Driver	5 receptions, 56 yards, TD
Lamar	Passing	Aiden McCown	17/32, 183 yards, 3 TD
Lamar	Rushing	Parker Jenkins	14 carries, 56 yards
Lamar	Receiving	Blake Thomas	3 receptions, 44 yards, TD

=== at Louisiana (FBS, Sabine Shoe) ===
No. 14 Lamar Cardinals (1–0) at Louisiana Ragin' Cajuns (FBS) (0–0) – Game summary

Quarter	1	2	3	4	Total
No. 14 Cardinals	0	0	0	7	7
Ragin' Cajuns (FBS)	7	21	7	3	38

at Our Lady of Lourdes Stadium • Lafayette, Louisiana

- Date: September 5
- Game time: 7:00 p.m.
- Game weather: Cloudy • Temperature: 78 °F (26 °C) • Wind: W at 1 mile per hour (1.6 km/h)
- Game attendance: 20,851
- Referee: Jeremy Parker
- TV announcers (ESPN+): Dan McDonald (play–by–play), Eric Mouton (analyst), and Ben Schafer (sideline reporter)

Game information

First quarter

- (7:15) LA – Darrell Smith 2-yard run, Tony Sterner kick (Drive: 10 plays, 74 yards, 4:41; Louisiana 7–0)

Second quarter

- (13:23) LA – Darrell Smith 25-yard run, Tony Sterner kick (Drive: 4 plays, 46 yards, 1:20; Louisiana 14–0)
- (9:09) LA – Anthony Reagan Jr. 11-yard run, Tony Sterner kick (Drive: 4 plays, 39 yards, 1:52; Louisiana 21–0)
- (0:31) LA – Lunch Winfield 22-yard run, Tony Sterner kick (Drive: 8 plays, 80 yards, 1:20; Louisiana 28–0)

Third quarter

- (0:00) LA – Steven Blanco 1-yard run, Tony Sterner kick (Drive: 9 plays, 60 yards, 5:45; Louisiana 35–0)

Fourth quarter

- (11:48) LAM – Lanar Kelley 40-yard interception return, Andres Sandoval kick (Louisiana 35–7)
- (2:58) LA – Tony Sterner 31-yard field goal (Drive: 14 plays, 67 yards, 8:50; Louisiana 38–7)

Statistics	LAM	LA
First downs	16	25
Plays–yards	60–205	69–474
Rushes–yards	29–56	41–243
Passing yards	149	231
Passing: comp–att–int	18–31–3	20–28–3
Turnovers	4	3
Time of possession	26:22	33:38

Team	Category	Player	Statistics
Lamar	Passing	Aiden McCown	15/26, 126 yards, 3 INT
Lamar	Rushing	Jojo Uga	8 carries, 24 yards
Lamar	Receiving	Kyndon Fuselier	3 receptions, 35 yards
Louisiana	Passing	Lunch Winfield	15/21, 189 yards, 2 INT
Louisiana	Rushing	Darrell Smith	10 carries, 84 yards, 2 TD
Louisiana	Receiving	Caden Jensen	5 receptions, 77 yards

=== at Idaho ===
No. 14 Lamar Cardinals (1–1) at Idaho Vandals (0–2) – Game summary

Quarter	1	2	3	4	Total
No. 14 Cardinals	0	20	0	3	23
Vandals	3	0	7	7	17

at Kibbie Dome • Moscow, Idaho

- Date: September 12
- Game time: 3:00 p.m.
- Game weather: Indoor
- Game attendance: 9,015
- Referee: Mike Bezner
- TV announcers (ESPN+): Austin Getz (play-by-play) and Adam Shackleford (analyst)

Game information

First quarter

- IDHO – Owen Forsman 38-yard field goal, 5:38. Idaho 3–0. Drive: 7 plays, 12 yards, 2:21.

Second quarter

- LAM – Andres Sandoval 36-yard field goal, 14:15. Tied 3–3. Drive: 10 plays, 69 yards, 6:18.
- LAM – Andres Sandoval 48-yard field goal, 8:13. Lamar 6–3. Drive: 9 plays, 34 yards, 5:03.
- LAM – Aiden McCown 3-yard run (Andres Sandoval kick), 1:08. Lamar 13–3. Drive: 6 plays, 70 yards, 2:33.
- LAM – Davin Driskell 15-yard pass from Aiden McCown (Andres Sandoval kick), 0:01. Lamar 20–3. Drive: 4 plays, 54 yards, 0:30.

Third quarter

- IDHO – Joshua Wood 1-yard run (Owen Forsman kick), 7:28. Lamar 20–10. Drive: 11 plays, 60 yards, 5:16.

Fourth quarter

- LAM – Andres Sandoval 45-yard field goal, 10:45. Lamar 23–10. Drive: 9 plays, 41 yards, 4:03.
- IDHO – Ferrari Miller 1-yard run (Owen Forsman kick), 1:24. Lamar 23–17. Drive: 11 plays, 63 yards, 3:36.

Statistics	LAM	IDHO
First downs	15	18
Plays–yards	55–303	77–296
Rushes–yards	32–144	37–91
Passing yards	159	205
Passing: comp–att–int	13–23–0	20–40–0
Turnovers	2	1
Time of possession	28:43	31:17

Team	Category	Player	Statistics
Lamar	Passing	Aiden McCown	13/22, 159 yards, TD
Lamar	Rushing	Jojo Uga	15 carries, 105 yards
Lamar	Receiving	Davin Driskell	3 receptions, 55 yards, TD
Idaho	Passing	Joshua Wood	20/40, 205 yards
Idaho	Rushing	Joshua Wood	19 carries, 50 yards, TD
Idaho	Receiving	Lonyatta Alexander Jr.	4 receptions, 64 yards

=== at Nicholls ===
No. 15 Lamar Cardinals (2–1) at Nicholls Colonels (2–2) – Game summary

Quarter	1	2	3	4	Total
No. 15 Cardinals	0	0	0	0	0
Colonels	0	0	0	0	0

at Manning Field at John L. Guidry Stadium • Thibodaux, Louisiana

- Date: September 26
- Game time: 3:00 p.m.
- TV: ESPN+

Game information

First quarter
Second quarter
Third quarter
Fourth quarter

Statistics	LAM	NICH
First downs		
Plays–yards		
Rushes–yards		
Passing yards		
Passing: comp–att–int		
Turnovers		
Time of possession		

Team	Category	Player	Statistics
Lamar	Passing		
Lamar	Rushing		
Lamar	Receiving		
Nicholls	Passing		
Nicholls	Rushing		
Nicholls	Receiving		

=== Northwestern State ===
Northwestern State Demons (0–5) at No. 14 Lamar Cardinals (3–1) – Game summary

Quarter	1	2	3	4	Total
Demons	0	0	0	0	0
No. 14 Cardinals	0	0	0	0	0

at Provost Umphrey Stadium • Beaumont, Texas

- Date: October 3
- Game time: 3:00 p.m.
- TV: ESPN+

Game information

First quarter
Second quarter
Third quarter
Fourth quarter

Statistics	NWST	LAM
First downs		
Plays–yards		
Rushes–yards		
Passing yards		
Passing: comp–att–int		
Turnovers		
Time of possession		

Team	Category	Player	Statistics
Northwestern State	Passing		
Northwestern State	Rushing		
Northwestern State	Receiving		
Lamar	Passing		
Lamar	Rushing		
Lamar	Receiving		

=== Incarnate Word ===
Incarnate Word Cardinals (2–3) at No. 11 Lamar Cardinals (4–1) – Game summary

Quarter	1	2	3	4	Total
Incarnate Word	0	14	7	14	35
No. 11 Lamar	10	14	7	7	38

at Provost Umphrey Stadium • Beaumont, Texas

- Date: October 10
- Game time: 3:00 p.m.
- Game weather: Sunny • Temperature: 87 °F (31 °C)
- Game attendance: 6,824
- Referee: James Brookhart
- TV: ESPN+

Game information

First quarter

- LU – 7:55 Andres Sandoval 32 yard field goal
  LU 3–0 Drive: 11 plays, 62 yards, 5:29
- LU – 0:43 Jojo Uga 25 yard run, Andres Sandoval kick
  LU 10–0 Drive: 7 plays, 72 yards, 3:31

Second quarter

- UIW – 13:25 Jayden Hibbler 10 yard run, Nick Rigas kick
  LU 10–7 Drive: 7 plays, 51 yards, 2:08
- LU – 11:17 Jojo Uga 57 yard run, Andres Sandoval kick
  LU 17–7 Drive: 4 plays, 75 yards, 2:08
- LU – 7:32 Jojo Uga 4 yard run, Andres Sandoval kick
  LU 24–7 Drive: 7 plays, 25 yards, 3:39
- UIW – 0:11 Emmett Brown 9 yard run, Nick Rigas kick
  LU 24–14 Drive: 10 plays, 77 yards, 3:35

Third quarter

- LU – 13:43 Parker Jenkins 62 yard run, Andres Sandoval kick
  LU 31–14 Drive: 4 plays, 75 yards, 1:11
- UIW – 12:40 Jacob Emmers 74 yard pass from Emmett Brown, Nick Rigas kick
  LU 31–21 Drive: 4 plays, 90 yards, 0:59

Fourth quarter

- LU – 14:57 Davin Driskell 3 yard pass from Aiden McCown, Andres Sandoval kick
  LU 38–21 Drive: 5 plays, 23 yards, 2:30
- UIW – 12:45 Patrick Batiste 58 yard fumble recovery, Nick Rigas kick
  LU 38–28
- UIW – 5:02 Tyrece Fairly–Diyem 5 yard pass from Emmett Brown, Nick Rigas kick
  LU 38–35 Drive: 12 plays, 61 yards, 3:48

Statistics	UIW	LAM
First downs	19	18
Plays–yards	66–386	69–398
Rushes–yards	27–83	47–275
Passing yards	303	123
Passing: comp–att–int	26–39–0	12–22–0
Turnovers	3	1
Time of possession	23:20	36:40

Team	Category	Player	Statistics
Incarnate Word	Passing	Emmett Brown	26/39, 303 yards, 2 TD
Incarnate Word	Rushing	Emmett Brown	16 carries, 50 yards, TD
Incarnate Word	Receiving	Jacob Emmers	7 receptions, 104 yards, TD
Lamar	Passing	Aiden McCown	12/22, 123 yards, TD
Lamar	Rushing	Jojo Uga	22 carries, 144 yards, 3 TD
Lamar	Receiving	Blake Thomas	3 receptions, 47 yards

=== at Southeastern Louisiana ===
No. 10 Lamar Cardinals (5–1) at Southeastern Louisiana Lions (3–3) – Game summary

Quarter	1	2	3	4	Total
No. 10 Cardinals	0	0	0	0	0
Lions	0	0	0	0	0

at Strawberry Stadium • Hammond, Louisiana

- Date: October 17

Game information

First quarter
Second quarter
Third quarter
Fourth quarter

Statistics	LAM	SELA
First downs		
Plays–yards		
Rushes–yards		
Passing yards		
Passing: comp–att–int		
Turnovers		
Time of possession		

Team	Category	Player	Statistics
Lamar	Passing		
Lamar	Rushing		
Lamar	Receiving		
Southeastern Louisiana	Passing		
Southeastern Louisiana	Rushing		
Southeastern Louisiana	Receiving		

=== Houston Christian ===
Houston Christian Huskies (4–3) at No. 16 Lamar Cardinals (5–2) – Game summary

Quarter	1	2	3	4	Total
Huskies	0	0	0	0	0
No. 16 Cardinals	0	0	0	0	0

at Provost Umphrey Stadium • Beaumont, Texas

- Date: October 24
- Game time: 3:00 p.m.

Game information

First quarter
Second quarter
Third quarter
Fourth quarter

Statistics	HCU	LAM
First downs		
Plays–yards		
Rushes–yards		
Passing yards		
Passing: comp–att–int		
Turnovers		
Time of possession		

Team	Category	Player	Statistics
Houston Christian	Passing		
Houston Christian	Rushing		
Houston Christian	Receiving		
Lamar	Passing		
Lamar	Rushing		
Lamar	Receiving		

=== at UT Rio Grande Valley ===
No. 15 Lamar Cardinals (6–2) at UT Rio Grande Valley Vaqueros (4–4) – Game summary

Quarter	1	2	3	4	Total
No. 15 Cardinals	0	0	0	0	0
Vaqueros	0	0	0	0	0

at Robert and Janet Vackar Stadium • Edinburg, Texas

- Date: October 31
- Game time: 7:00 p.m.

Game information

First quarter
Second quarter
Third quarter
Fourth quarter

Statistics	LAM	RGV
First downs		
Plays–yards		
Rushes–yards		
Passing yards		
Passing: comp–att–int		
Turnovers		
Time of possession		

Team	Category	Player	Statistics
Lamar	Passing		
Lamar	Rushing		
Lamar	Receiving		
UT Rio Grande Valley	Passing		
UT Rio Grande Valley	Rushing		
UT Rio Grande Valley	Receiving		

=== No. 2 Stephen F. Austin ===
No. 2 Stephen F. Austin Lumberjacks (9–0) at No. 13 Lamar Cardinals (7–2) – Game summary

Quarter	1	2	3	4	Total
No. 2 Lumberjacks	0	0	0	0	0
No. 13 Cardinals	0	0	0	0	0

at Provost Umphrey Stadium • Beaumont, Texas

- Date: November 7

Game information

First quarter
Second quarter
Third quarter
Fourth quarter

Statistics	SFA	LAM
First downs		
Plays–yards		
Rushes–yards		
Passing yards		
Passing: comp–att–int		
Turnovers		
Time of possession		

Team	Category	Player	Statistics
Stephen F. Austin	Passing		
Stephen F. Austin	Rushing		
Stephen F. Austin	Receiving		
Lamar	Passing		
Lamar	Rushing		
Lamar	Receiving		

=== East Texas A&M ===
East Texas A&M Lions (3–7) at No. 7т Lamar Cardinals (8–2) – Game summary

Quarter	1	2	3	4	Total
Lions	0	0	0	0	0
No. 7т Cardinals	0	0	0	0	0

at Provost Umphrey Stadium • Beaumont, Texas

- Date: November 14

Game information

First quarter
Second quarter
Third quarter
Fourth quarter

Statistics	ETAM	LAM
First downs		
Plays–yards		
Rushes–yards		
Passing yards		
Passing: comp–att–int		
Turnovers		
Time of possession		

Team	Category	Player	Statistics
East Texas A&M	Passing		
East Texas A&M	Rushing		
East Texas A&M	Receiving		
Lamar	Passing		
Lamar	Rushing		
Lamar	Receiving		

=== at McNeese (Battle of the Border) ===
No. 4 Lamar Cardinals (9–2) at McNeese Cowboys (5–6) – Game summary

Quarter	1	2	3	4	Total
No. 4 Cardinals	0	0	0	0	0
Cowboys	0	0	0	0	0

at Navarre Stadium • Lake Charles, Louisiana

- Date: November 21

Game information

First quarter
Second quarter
Third quarter
Fourth quarter

Statistics	LAM	MCN
First downs		
Plays–yards		
Rushes–yards		
Passing yards		
Passing: comp–att–int		
Turnovers		
Time of possession		

Team	Category	Player	Statistics
Lamar	Passing		
Lamar	Rushing		
Lamar	Receiving		
McNeese	Passing		
McNeese	Rushing		
McNeese	Receiving		

== Rankings ==
Ranking movements Legend: ██ Increase in ranking ██ Decrease in ranking т = Tied with team above or below
	Week														
Poll	Pre	1	2	3	4	5	6	7	8	9	10	11	12	13	Final
STATS	20	14	14	14т	15	14	11	10	16	15	13	7т	4		
Coaches	21	16	17	15	15	13	10	8	15	13	12	8	5		
