= 2026 UT Rio Grande Valley Vaqueros football team =

American college football season

2026 UT Rio Grande Valley Vaqueros football
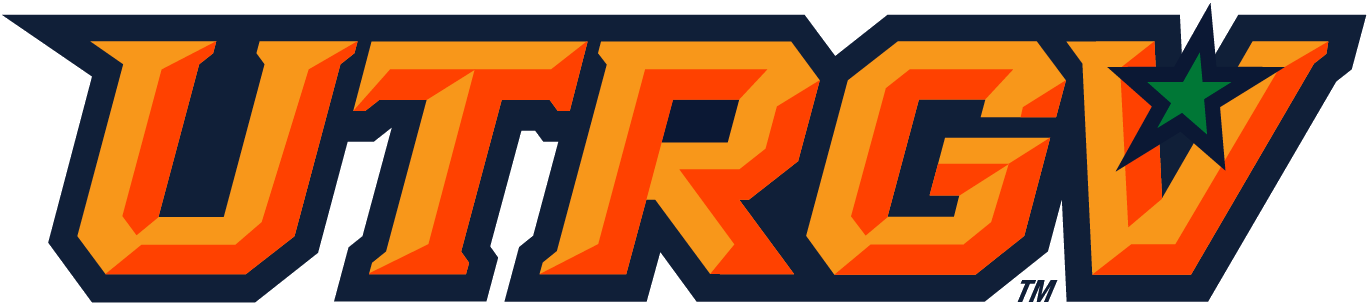
- Conference: Southland Conference
- Record: 6–6 (4–5 SLC)
- Head coach: Travis Bush (2nd season)
- Offensive coordinator: Jeff Bowen (2nd season)
- Co-offensive coordinator: Theron Aych (1st season)
- Offensive scheme: Spread
- Defensive coordinator: Brian Gamble (2nd season)
- Base defense: 4–2–5
- Home stadium: Robert and Janet Vackar Stadium

2026 Southland Conference football standings
	Conf.			Overall
Team	W		L	W		L
No. 4 Lamar +^	8	–	1	10	–	2
No. 5 Stephen F. Austin +	8	–	1	11	–	1
No. 21 Incarnate Word	7	–	2	8	–	4
UT Rio Grande Valley	4	–	5	6	–	6
Southeastern Louisiana	4	–	5	6	–	6
Houston Christian	4	–	5	5	–	7
McNeese	4	–	5	5	–	7
Nicholls	3	–	6	4	–	8
East Texas A&M	3	–	6	3	–	9
Northwestern State	0	–	9	0	–	12
+ – Conference co-champions; ^ – FCS playoff participant; As of November 22, 2026; Rankings from STATS Poll

The 2026 UT Rio Grande Valley Vaqueros football team will represent the University of Texas Rio Grande Valley (UTRGV) as a member of the Southland Conference (SLC) during the 2026 NCAA Division I FCS football season. The Vaqueros will be led by second-year head coach Travis Bush and will play their home games at Robert and Janet Vackar Stadium in Edinburg, Texas.

== Schedule ==
Date	Time	Opponent	Site	TV	Result	Attendance
August 29	7:00 p.m.	No. 18 (DII) UT Permian Basin*	Robert and Janet Vackar Stadium; Edinburg, TX	ESPN+	W 44–0	13,498
September 5	2:30 p.m.	at UTSA*	Alamodome; San Antonio, TX	ESPN+	L 16–45	33,403
September 12	6:00 p.m.	at Nicholls	John L. Guidry Stadium; Thibodaux, LA	ESPN+	L 28–31	6,888
September 19	7:00 p.m.	McNeese	Robert and Janet Vackar Stadium; Edinburg, TX	ESPN+	W 27–10	13,492
October 3	6:00 p.m.	at East Texas A&M	Memorial Stadium; Commerce, TX	ESPN+	L 17–20	2,733
October 10	7:00 p.m.	Southeastern Louisiana	Robert and Janet Vackar Stadium; Edinburg, TX	ESPN+	W 14–3	12,287
October 17	6:00 p.m.	at Incarnate Word	Gayle and Tom Benson Stadium; San Antonio, TX	ESPN+	L 16–41	3,682
October 24	4:00 p.m.	at Central Arkansas*	Estes Stadium; Conway, AR	ESPN+	W 30–27	5,058
October 31	7:00 p.m.	No. 15 Lamar^{†}	Robert and Janet Vackar Stadium; Edinburg, TX	ESPN+	L 23–52	10,631
November 7	1:00 p.m.	at Northwestern State	Harry Turpin Stadium; Natchitoches, LA	ESPN+	W 52–7	1,108
November 14	5:00 p.m.	No. 7т Stephen F. Austin	Robert and Janet Vackar Stadium; Edinburg, TX	ESPN+	L 0–48	11,314
November 21	4:00 p.m.	at Houston Christian	Husky Stadium; Houston, TX	ESPN+	W 26–14	1,658
*Non-conference game; ^{†}Homecoming; Rankings from STATS Poll released prior to the game; All times are in Central time

== Game summaries ==
=== No. 18 (DII) UT Permian Basin ===
No. 18 (DII) UT Permian Basin Falcons (0–0) at UT Rio Grande Valley Vaqueros (0–0) – Game summary

Quarter	1	2	3	4	Total
No. 18 (DII) Falcons	0	0	0	0	0
Vaqueros	17	6	7	14	44

at Robert and Janet Vackar Stadium, Edinburg, Texas

- Date: August 29
- Game time: 7:00 p.m.
- Game weather: Sunny, 93 °F (34 °C)
- Game attendance: 13,498
- Referee: Matt Beck
- TV announcers (ESPN+): Mark May, Aaron Saenz and Jaeda Rael

Game information
First quarter
- RGV – Kyran Lee 15-yard pass from Aidan Jakobsohn (Brysen Gardner kick), 12:48. Vaqueros 7–0. Drive: 5 plays, 72 yards, 2:07.
- RGV – Brysen Gardner 28-yard field goal, 6:46. Vaqueros 10–0. Drive: 10 plays, 37 yards, 4:48.
- RGV – Tavian Cord 29-yard pass from Garret Rangel (Brysen Gardner kick), 2:10. Vaqueros 17–0. Drive: 4 plays, 92 yards, 1:40.

Second quarter

- RGV – Brysen Gardner 25-yard field goal, 11:42. Vaqueros 20–0. Drive: 10 plays, 75 yards, 4:17.
- RGV – Brysen Gardner 36-yard field goal, 0:00. Vaqueros 23–0. Drive: 8 plays, 48 yards, 2:02.

Third quarter

- RGV – Garret Rangel 2-yard run (Brysen Gardner kick), 8:32. Vaqueros 30–0. Drive: 11 plays, 64 yards, 4:47.

Fourth quarter

- RGV – Malachi Lane 6-yard run (Brysen Gardner kick), 14:48. Vaqueros 37–0. Drive: 11 plays, 80 yards, 5:05.
- RGV – Brennan Carroll 38-yard run (Troop O'Neal kick), 11:37. Vaqueros 44–0. Drive: 4 plays, 68 yards, 2:00.

Statistics	UTPB	RGV
First downs	9	29
Plays–yards	48–165	82–675
Rushes–yards	12–13	47–271
Passing yards	152	404
Passing: comp–att–int	15–36–2	23–35–0
Turnovers	3	2
Time of possession	21:17	38:43

Team	Category	Player	Statistics
UT Permian Basin	Passing	Nate TenBarge	14/34, 151 yards, 2 INT
UT Permian Basin	Rushing	Cheno Navarrette	3 carries, 11 yards
UT Permian Basin	Receiving	Traylen Suel	5 receptions, 63 yards
UT Rio Grande Valley	Passing	Garret Rangel	12/15, 211 yards, TD
UT Rio Grande Valley	Rushing	Brennan Carroll	9 carries, 84 yards, TD
UT Rio Grande Valley	Receiving	Kyran Lee	6 receptions, 141 yards, TD

=== at UTSA (FBS) ===
UT Rio Grande Valley Vaqueros (1–0) at UTSA Roadrunners (FBS) (0–0) – Game summary

Quarter	1	2	3	4	Total
Vaqueros	0	6	0	10	16
Roadrunners (FBS)	7	24	0	14	45

at Alamodome • San Antonio, Texas

- Date: September 5
- Game time: 2:30 p.m.
- Game weather: none (played indoors)
- Game attendance: 33,403
- Referee: Cory Hanson
- TV announcers (ESPN+): David Saltzmann and Brad Hopkins

Game information

First quarter

- UTSA – AJ Wilson Jr. 36-yard pass from Owen McCown (Michael Petro kick), 6:51. Roadrunners 7–0. Drive: 8 plays, 80 yards, 3:22.

Second quarter

- UTSA – Brandon Young Jr. 7-yard pass from Owen McCown (Michael Petro kick), 13:16. Roadrunners 14–0. Drive: 7 plays, 43 yards, 2:21.
- UTSA – Ahamad Chapman 49-yard interception return (Michael Petro kick), 12:40. Roadrunners 21–0.
- RGV – Brysen Gardner 44-yard field goal, 7:11. Roadrunners 21–3. Drive: 13 plays, 68 yards, 5:23.
- UTSA – Will Henderson III 75-yard run (Michael Petro kick), 7:00. Roadrunners 28–3. Drive: 1 play, 75 yards, 0:11.
- UTSA – Michael Petro 30-yard field goal, 0:54. Roadrunners 31–3. Drive: 7 plays, 49 yards, 2:40.
- RGV – Brysen Gardner 24-yard field goal, 0:00. Roadrunners 31–6. Drive: 8 plays, 65 yards, 0:54.

Third quarter

- No scoring plays.

Fourth quarter

- UTSA – DJ Allen Jr. 62-yard pass from Owen McCown (Michael Petro kick), 10:41. Roadrunners 38–6. Drive: 2 plays, 61 yards, 0:45.
- RGV – Brysen Gardner 40-yard field goal, 6:15. Roadrunners 38–9. Drive: 8 plays, 47 yards, 3:28.
- UTSA – A'Marion Peterson 53-yard run (Michael Petro kick), 2:56. Roadrunners 45–9. Drive: 5 plays, 83 yards, 3:14.
- RGV – Atzel Chavez Jr. 1-yard run (Brysen Gardner kick), 0:04. Roadrunners 45–16. Drive: 9 plays, 74 yards, 2:44.

Statistics	RGV	UTSA
First downs	22	23
Plays–yards	81–422	58–527
Rushes–yards	34–177	29–252
Passing yards	245	275
Passing: comp–att–int	26–47–2	22–29–0
Turnovers	2	0
Time of possession	34:49	25:11

Team	Category	Player	Statistics
UT Rio Grande Valley	Passing	Garret Rangel	19/32, 152 yards
UT Rio Grande Valley	Rushing	Broderick Taylor	6 carries, 73 yards
UT Rio Grande Valley	Receiving	Jaydon Smith	2 receptions, 68 yards
UTSA	Passing	Owen McCown	22/27, 275 yards, 3 TD
UTSA	Rushing	Will Henderson III	9 carries, 101 yards, TD
UTSA	Receiving	DJ Allen Jr.	3 receptions, 116 yards, TD

=== at Nicholls ===
UT Rio Grande Valley Vaqueros (1–1) at Nicholls Colonels (1–1) – Game summary

Quarter	1	2	3	4	Total
Vaqueros	0	14	0	14	28
Colonels	7	10	14	0	31

at Manning Field at John L. Guidry Stadium • Thibodaux, Louisiana

- Date: September 12
- Game time: 6:00 p.m. CDT
- Game weather: Cloudy • Temperature: 80 °F (27 °C) • Wind: SW 5 mph
- Game attendance: 6,888
- Referee: James Brookhart
- TV: ESPN+

Game information

First quarter

- (11:15) NICH – Jackson Dufrene 18-yard pass from Ean Rodrigue, Kingston Phan kick (Drive: 6 plays, 31 yards, 1:48; Nicholls 7–0)

Second quarter

- (14:22) NICH – Jackson Dufrene 20-yard pass from Ean Rodrigue, Kingston Phan kick (Drive: 12 plays, 80 yards, 4:19; Nicholls 14–0)
- (11:45) RGV – Kyran Lee 29-yard pass from Garret Rangel, Brysen Gardner kick (Drive: 6 plays, 58 yards, 2:31; Nicholls 14–7)
- (4:25) RGV – TJ Dement 1-yard run, Brysen Gardner kick (Drive: 2 plays, 3 yards, 0:23; Tied 14–14)
- (3:23) NICH – Kingston Phan 32-yard field goal (Drive: 6 plays, 60 yards, 1:02; Nicholls 17–14)

Third quarter

- (6:31) NICH – Jackson Dufrene 3-yard pass from Ean Rodrigue, Kingston Phan kick (Drive: 17 plays, 75 yards, 8:29; Nicholls 24–14)
- (2:06) NICH – Shane Lee 10-yard pass from Ean Rodrigue, Kingston Phan kick (Drive: 6 plays, 47 yards, 2:13; Nicholls 31–14)

Fourth quarter

- (8:59) RGV – Jaydon Smith 36-yard pass from Aidan Jakobsohn, Brysen Gardner kick (Drive: 14 plays, 77 yards, 5:42; Nicholls 31–21)
- (0:57) RGV – Christian Sabsook 7-yard pass from Aidan Jakobsohn, Brysen Gardner kick (Drive: 11 plays, 71 yards, 2:35; Nicholls 31–28)

Statistics	RGV	NICH
First downs	21	21
Plays–yards	78–327	75–322
Rushes–yards	33–63	39–86
Passing yards	264	236
Passing: comp–att–int	19–45–2	21–36–1
Time of possession	29:44	30:16

Team	Category	Player	Statistics
UT Rio Grande Valley	Passing	Aidan Jakobsohn	7/17, 137 yards, 2 TD
UT Rio Grande Valley	Rushing	Brennan Carroll	8 carries, 36 yards
UT Rio Grande Valley	Receiving	Kyran Lee	8 receptions, 125 yards, TD
Nicholls	Passing	Ean Rodrigue	21/36, 236 yards, 4 TD, INT
Nicholls	Rushing	Shane Lee	13 carries, 47 yards
Nicholls	Receiving	Jackson Dufrene	5 receptions, 100 yards, 3 TD

=== McNeese ===
McNeese Cowboys (1–2) at UT Rio Grande Valley Vaqueros (1–2) – Game summary

Quarter	1	2	3	4	Total
Cowboys	0	3	0	7	10
Vaqueros	7	10	7	3	27

at Robert and Janet Vackar Stadium • Edinburg, Texas

- Date: September 19
- Game time: 7:00 p.m.
- Game weather: Sunny
- Game attendance: 13,492
- Referee: Gary Leeper
- TV announcers (ESPN+): Mark May (play-by-play), Aaron Saenz (analyst) and Jaeda Rael (sideline)

Game information

First quarter

- (0:42) RGV – Kyran Lee 4-yard pass from Aidan Jakobsohn, Brysen Gardner kick (Drive: 7 plays, 76 yards, 2:52; UT Rio Grande Valley 7–0)

Second quarter

- (9:38) RGV – Aidan Jakobsohn 7-yard run, Brysen Gardner kick (Drive: 9 plays, 77 yards, 4:40; UT Rio Grande Valley 14–0)
- (4:59) MCN – Deaglan Camron 28-yard field goal (Drive: 12 plays, 64 yards, 4:49; UT Rio Grande Valley 14–3)
- (0:45) RGV – Brysen Gardner 28-yard field goal (Drive: 10 plays, 74 yards, 4:07; UT Rio Grande Valley 17–3)

Third quarter

- (0:10) RGV – Aidan Jakobsohn 3-yard run, Brysen Gardner kick (Drive: 6 plays, 62 yards, 2:41; UT Rio Grande Valley 24–3)

Fourth quarter

- (14:08) MCN – Curtis Deville Jr. 39-yard pass from Devin Lippold, Deaglan Camron kick (Drive: 3 plays, 75 yards, 1:02; UT Rio Grande Valley 24–10)
- (1:55) RGV – Brysen Gardner 23-yard field goal (Drive: 10 plays, 80 yards, 6:31; UT Rio Grande Valley 27–10)

Statistics	MCN	RGV
First downs	18	26
Plays–yards	62–279	69–488
Rushes–yards	28–109	41–315
Passing yards	170	173
Passing: comp–att–int	14–34–3	13–28–1
Turnovers	4	1
Time of possession	26:23	33:37

Team	Category	Player	Statistics
McNeese	Passing	Devin Lippold	12/29, 141 yards, TD, 2 INT
McNeese	Rushing	Devin Lippold	9 carries, 45 yards
McNeese	Receiving	Curtis Deville Jr.	3 receptions, 71 yards, TD
UT Rio Grande Valley	Passing	Aidan Jakobsohn	10/20, 137 yards, TD, INT
UT Rio Grande Valley	Rushing	TJ Dement	13 carries, 144 yards
UT Rio Grande Valley	Receiving	Jaydon Smith	4 receptions, 81 yards

=== at East Texas A&M ===
UT Rio Grande Valley Vaqueros (2–2) at East Texas A&M Lions (1–4) – Game summary

Quarter	1	2	3	4	Total
Vaqueros	0	0	0	0	0
Lions	0	0	0	0	0

at Ernest Hawkins Field at Memorial Stadium • Commerce, Texas

- Date: October 3
- Game time: 6:00 p.m.
- TV: ESPN+

Game information

First quarter
Second quarter
Third quarter
Fourth quarter

Statistics	RGV	ETAM
First downs		
Plays–yards		
Rushes–yards		
Passing yards		
Passing: comp–att–int		
Turnovers		
Time of possession		

Team	Category	Player	Statistics
UT Rio Grande Valley	Passing		
UT Rio Grande Valley	Rushing		
UT Rio Grande Valley	Receiving		
East Texas A&M	Passing		
East Texas A&M	Rushing		
East Texas A&M	Receiving		

=== Southeastern Louisiana ===
Southeastern Louisiana Lions (3–2) at UT Rio Grande Valley Vaqueros (2–3)

Quarter	1	2	3	4	Total
Lions	0	0	0	0	0
Vaqueros	0	0	0	0	0

at Harry Turpin Stadium • Edinburg, Texas

- Date: October 10
- Game time: 7:00 p.m.
- TV: ESPN+

Game information

First quarter
Second quarter
Third quarter
Fourth quarter

Statistics	SELA	RGV
First downs		
Plays–yards		
Rushes–yards		
Passing yards		
Passing: comp–att–int		
Time of possession		

Team	Category	Player	Statistics
Southeastern Louisiana	Passing		
Southeastern Louisiana	Rushing		
Southeastern Louisiana	Receiving		
UT Rio Grande Valley	Passing		
UT Rio Grande Valley	Rushing		
UT Rio Grande Valley	Receiving		

=== at Incarnate Word ===
UT Rio Grande Valley Vaqueros (3–3) at Incarnate Word Cardinals (2–4) – Game summary

Quarter	1	2	3	4	Total
Vaqueros	3	7	0	6	16
Cardinals	10	17	7	7	41

at Gayle and Tom Benson Stadium • San Antonio, Texas

- Date: October 17
- Game time: 6:00 p.m.
- Game weather: Sunny • Temperature: 68 °F (20 °C) • Wind: NE at 6 miles per hour (9.7 km/h)
- Game attendance: 3,682
- Referee: Matt Beck
- TV: ESPN+

Game information

First quarter

- UIW – 14:14 Lontrell Turner 2 yard run, Nick Rigas kick
  UIW 7–0 Drive: 6 plays, 40 yards, 0:39
- UTRGV – 11:48 Brysen Gardner 37 yard field goal
  UIW 7–3 Drive: 9 plays, 55 yards, 2:26
- UIW – 4:30 Nick Rigas 22 yard field goal
  UIW 10–3 Drive: 4 plays, 7 yards, 1:50

Second quarter

- UTRGV – 14:49 Corey Holmes 17 yard pass from Aidan Jakobsohn, Brysen Gardner kick
  Tied 10–10 Drive: 10 plays, 73 yards, 4:33
- UIW – 6:06 Jayden Hibbler 15 yard pass from Emmett Brown, Nick Rigas kick
  UIW 17–10 Drive: 5 plays, 35 yards, 1:42
- UIW – 1:56 Nick Rigas 33 yard field goal
  UIW 20–10 Drive: 8 plays, 50 yards, 2:04
- UIW – 1:39 Roy Alexander 3 yard run, Nick Rigas kick
  UIW 27–10 Drive: 1 play, 3 yards, 0:06

Third quarter

- UIW – 12:39 Damashja Harris 2 yard run, Nick Rigas kick
  UIW 34–10 Drive: 9 plays, 75 yards, 2:21

Fourth quarter

- UTRGV – 11:56 TJ Dement 2 yard run, 2–point conversion failed
  UIW 34–16 Drive: 8 plays, 80 yards, 4:32
- UIW – 4:15 Damashja Harris 12 yard run, Nick Rigas kick
  UIW 41–16 Drive: 12 plays, 75 yards, 7:41

Statistics	RGV	UIW
First downs	22	24
Plays–yards	76–331	70–394
Rushes–yards	29–56	37–201
Passing yards	275	193
Passing: comp–att–int	29–47–3	21–33–1
Turnovers	4	2
Time of possession	32:43	27:17

Team	Category	Player	Statistics
UT Rio Grande Valley	Passing	Aidan Jakobsohn	27/45, 255 yards, TD, 3 INT
UT Rio Grande Valley	Rushing	TJ Dement	10 carries, 30 yards, TD
UT Rio Grande Valley	Receiving	Clint Thomas, Jr.	4 receptions, 82 yards
Incarnate Word	Passing	Emmett Brown	21/33, 193 yards, TD, INT
Incarnate Word	Rushing	Jayden Hibbler	14 carries, 95 yards
Incarnate Word	Receiving	Jayden Hibbler	7 receptions, 92 yards, TD

=== at Central Arkansas ===
UT Rio Grande Valley Vaqueros (3–4) at Central Arkansas Bears (2–5) – Game summary

Quarter	1	2	3	4	Total
Vaqueros	0	0	0	0	0
Bears	0	0	0	0	0

at Estes Stadium • Conway, Arkansas

- Date: October 24
- Game time: 4:00 p.m.

Game information

First quarter
Second quarter
Third quarter
Fourth quarter

Statistics	RGV	CARK
First downs		
Plays–yards		
Rushes–yards		
Passing yards		
Passing: comp–att–int		
Turnovers		
Time of possession		

Team	Category	Player	Statistics
UT Rio Grande Valley	Passing		
UT Rio Grande Valley	Rushing		
UT Rio Grande Valley	Receiving		
Central Arkansas	Passing		
Central Arkansas	Rushing		
Central Arkansas	Receiving		

=== No. 15 Lamar ===
No. 15 Lamar Cardinals (6–2) at UT Rio Grande Valley Vaqueros (4–4) – Game summary

Quarter	1	2	3	4	Total
No. 15 Cardinals	0	0	0	0	0
Vaqueros	0	0	0	0	0

at Robert and Janet Vackar Stadium • Edinburg, Texas

- Date: October 31
- Game time: 7:00 p.m.

Game information

First quarter
Second quarter
Third quarter
Fourth quarter

Statistics	LAM	RGV
First downs		
Plays–yards		
Rushes–yards		
Passing yards		
Passing: comp–att–int		
Turnovers		
Time of possession		

Team	Category	Player	Statistics
Lamar	Passing		
Lamar	Rushing		
Lamar	Receiving		
UT Rio Grande Valley	Passing		
UT Rio Grande Valley	Rushing		
UT Rio Grande Valley	Receiving		

=== at Northwestern State ===
UT Rio Grande Valley Vaqueros (4–5) at Northwestern State Demons (0–9) – Game summary

Quarter	1	2	3	4	Total
Vaqueros	0	0	0	0	0
Demons	0	0	0	0	0

at Harry Turpin Stadium • Natchitoches, Louisiana

- Date: November 7
- Game time: 1:00 p.m.

Game information

First quarter
Second quarter
Third quarter
Fourth quarter

Statistics	RGV	NWST
First downs		
Plays–yards		
Rushes–yards		
Passing yards		
Passing: comp–att–int		
Turnovers		
Time of possession		

Team	Category	Player	Statistics
UT Rio Grande Valley	Passing		
UT Rio Grande Valley	Rushing		
UT Rio Grande Valley	Receiving		
Northwestern State	Passing		
Northwestern State	Rushing		
Northwestern State	Receiving		

=== No. 7т Stephen F. Austin ===
No. 7т Stephen F. Austin Lumberjacks (9–1) at UT Rio Grande Valley Vaqueros (5–5) – Game summary

Quarter	1	2	3	4	Total
No. 7т Lumberjacks	0	0	0	0	0
Vaqueros	0	0	0	0	0

at Robert and Janet Vackar Stadium • Edinburg, Texas

- Date: November 14
- Game time: 5:00 p.m.

Game information

First quarter
Second quarter
Third quarter
Fourth quarter

Statistics	SFA	RGV
First downs		
Plays–yards		
Rushes–yards		
Passing yards		
Passing: comp–att–int		
Turnovers		
Time of possession		

Team	Category	Player	Statistics
Stephen F. Austin	Passing		
Stephen F. Austin	Rushing		
Stephen F. Austin	Receiving		
UT Rio Grande Valley	Passing		
UT Rio Grande Valley	Rushing		
UT Rio Grande Valley	Receiving		

=== at Houston Christian ===
UT Rio Grande Valley Vaqueros (5–6) at Houston Christian Huskies (5–6) – Game summary

Quarter	1	2	3	4	Total
Vaqueros	0	0	0	0	0
Huskies	0	0	0	0	0

at Husky Stadium • Houston, Texas

- Date: November 21
- Game time: 4:00 p.m.

Game information

First quarter
Second quarter
Third quarter
Fourth quarter

Statistics	RGV	HCU
First downs		
Plays–yards		
Rushes–yards		
Passing yards		
Passing: comp–att–int		
Turnovers		
Time of possession		

Team	Category	Player	Statistics
UT Rio Grande Valley	Passing		
UT Rio Grande Valley	Rushing		
UT Rio Grande Valley	Receiving		
Houston Christian	Passing		
Houston Christian	Rushing		
Houston Christian	Receiving		

== Rankings ==
Ranking movements Legend: ██ Increase in ranking ██ Decrease in ranking — = Not ranked RV = Received votes
	Week														
Poll	Pre	1	2	3	4	5	6	7	8	9	10	11	12	13	Final
STATS	RV	RV	RV	—	—	—									
Coaches	RV	RV	RV	—	RV	RV									
