= 2026 Northwestern State Demons football team =

American college football season

2026 Northwestern State Demons football
- Conference: Southland Conference
- Record: 0–12 (0–9 SLC)
- Head coach: Blaine McCorkle (3rd season; first 11 games); Norman Joseph (interim; remainder of season)
- Offensive coordinator: Carson Stewart (2nd season)
- Offensive scheme: Spread
- Defensive coordinator: Matt Conner (3rd season)
- Base defense: 3–4
- Home stadium: Harry Turpin Stadium

2026 Southland Conference football standings
	Conf.			Overall
Team	W		L	W		L
No. 5 Stephen F. Austin	8	–	1	11	–	1
No. 4 Lamar	7	–	1	9	–	2
No. 21 Incarnate Word	6	–	2	7	–	4
McNeese	4	–	4	5	–	6
Houston Christian	4	–	4	5	–	6
Southeastern Louisiana	4	–	5	6	–	6
East Texas A&M	3	–	5	3	–	8
UT Rio Grande Valley	3	–	5	5	–	6
Nicholls	3	–	6	4	–	8
Northwestern State	0	–	9	0	–	12
As of November 20, 2026; Rankings from STATS Poll

The 2026 Northwestern State Demons football team represented Northwestern State University as a member of the Southland Conference (SLC) during the 2026 NCAA Division I FCS football season. The Demons were led by third-year head coach Blaine McCorkle and played their home games at Harry Turpin Stadium in Natchitoches, Louisiana.

== Schedule ==
Date	Time	Opponent	Site	TV	Result	Attendance
August 27	7:00 p.m.	Louisiana Christian*	Harry Turpin Stadium; Natchitoches, LA	ESPN+	L 37–42	6,438
September 5	6:30 p.m.	at Louisiana Tech*	Joe Aillet Stadium; Ruston, LA (rivalry)	ESPN+	L 6–80	13,108
September 12	6:00 p.m.	at East Texas A&M	Ernest Hawkins Field at Memorial Stadium; Commerce, TX	ESPN+	L 14–38	3,031
September 19	7:00 p.m.	at Weber State*	Stewart Stadium; Ogden, UT	ESPN+	L 20–49	7,738
September 26	6:00 p.m.	Southeastern Louisiana	Harry Turpin Stadium; Natchitoches, LA (rivalry)	ESPN+	L 21–52	1,792
October 3	6:00 p.m.	at No. 14 Lamar	Provost Umphrey Stadium; Beaumont, TX	ESPN+	L 14–42	7,526
October 17	12:00 p.m.	McNeese	Harry Turpin Stadium; Natchitoches, LA (rivalry)	ESPN+	L 21–24	2,341
October 24	2:00 p.m.	Nicholls^{†}	Harry Turpin Stadium; Natchitoches, LA (NSU Challenge)	ESPN+	L 27–31	3,081
October 31	4:00 p.m.	at Incarnate Word	Gayle and Tom Benson Stadium; San Antonio, TX	ESPN+	L 14–66	2,057
November 7	1:00 p.m.	UT Rio Grande Valley	Harry Turpin Stadium; Natchitoches, LA	ESPN+	L 7–52	1,108
November 14	1:00 p.m.	Houston Christian	Harry Turpin Stadium; Natchitoches, LA	ESPN+	L 21–28	1,013
November 19	6:00 p.m.	at No. 5 Stephen F. Austin	Homer Bryce Stadium; Nacogdoches, TX (Chief Caddo)	ESPN+	L 0–66	5,673
*Non-conference game; ^{†}Homecoming; Rankings from STATS Poll released prior to the game; All times are in Central time

== Game summaries ==
=== Louisiana Christian (NAIA) ===
Louisiana Christian Wildcats (NAIA) (0–0) at Northwestern State Demons (0–0) – Game summary

Quarter	1	2	3	4	Total
Wildcats (NAIA)	7	7	21	7	42
Demons	13	14	3	7	37

at Harry Turpin Stadium • Natchitoches, Louisiana

- Date: August 27
- Game time: 7:00 p.m. CDT
- Game weather: Clear • Temperature: 89 °F (32 °C) • Wind: E 4 mph
- Game attendance: 6,438
- Referee: Rex Rose
- TV announcers (ESPN+): Patrick Netherton (play-by-play), Tyler Moody (analyst) and Jason Pugh (sideline)

Game information

First quarter

- NWST – Payne Williams III 32-yard field goal, 11:03. Demons 3–0. Drive: 8 plays, 28 yards, 3:49.
- NWST – Zay Davis 8-yard run (Payne Williams III kick), 9:13. Demons 10–0. Drive: 3 plays, 15 yards, 1:09.
- LCHR – Datlan Cunningham 2-yard run (Preston Baker kick), 6:11. Demons 10–7. Drive: 9 plays, 75 yards, 3:02.
- NWST – Payne Williams III 47-yard field goal, 1:42. Demons 13–7. Drive: 10 plays, 45 yards, 4:29.

Second quarter

- LCHR – Jaterrius Johnson 2-yard run (Preston Baker kick), 14:51. Wildcats 14–13. Drive: 6 plays, 25 yards, 1:40.
- NWST – Abram Johnston 1-yard run (Payne Williams III kick), 12:08. Demons 20–14. Drive: 5 plays, 32 yards, 2:43.
- NWST – Jimmie Duncan 59-yard pass from Abram Johnston (Payne Williams III kick), 7:37. Demons 27–14. Drive: 6 plays, 81 yards, 2:59.

Third quarter

- LCHR – Datlan Cunningham 37-yard run (Preston Baker kick), 13:06. Demons 27–21. Drive: 5 plays, 65 yards, 1:54.
- LCHR – Ernest Mitchell 42-yard interception return (Preston Baker kick), 11:57. Wildcats 28–27.
- NWST – Payne Williams III 39-yard field goal, 8:54. Demons 30–28. Drive: 5 plays, 53 yards, 3:03.
- LCHR – Darius Washington 24-yard pass from Bryce Perkins (Preston Baker kick), 5:20. Wildcats 35–30. Drive: 10 plays, 75 yards, 3:34.

Fourth quarter

- LCHR – Omarius Davis 52-yard pass from Bryce Perkins (Preston Baker kick), 14:20. Wildcats 42–30. Drive: 4 plays, 64 yards, 1:10.
- NWST – Dylan Rhodes 5-yard pass from Abram Johnston (Payne Williams III kick), 2:47. Wildcats 42–37. Drive: 11 plays, 70 yards, 2:49.

Statistics	LCHR	NWST
First downs	19	29
Plays–yards	63–347	77–525
Rushes–yards	36–164	32–184
Passing yards	183	341
Passing: comp–att–int	15–27–1	32–45–1
Turnovers	1	3
Time of possession	23:07	36:53

Team	Category	Player	Statistics
Louisiana Christian	Passing	Bryce Perkins	14/25, 178 yards, 2 TD, INT
Louisiana Christian	Rushing	Datlan Cunningham	14 carries, 117 yards, 2 TD
Louisiana Christian	Receiving	Omarius Davis	5 receptions, 81 yards, TD
Northwestern State	Passing	Abram Johnston	30/42, 319 yards, 2 TD, INT
Northwestern State	Rushing	Zay Davis	12 carries, 124 yards, TD
Northwestern State	Receiving	Jimmie Duncan	3 receptions, 93 yards, TD

=== at Louisiana Tech (FBS, rivalry) ===
Northwestern State Demons (0–1) at Louisiana Tech Bulldogs (FBS) (0–0) – Game summary

Quarter	1	2	3	4	Total
Demons	3	0	0	3	6
Bulldogs (FBS)	21	42	14	3	80

at Joe Aillet Stadium • Ruston, Louisiana

- Date: September 5
- Game time: 6:30 p.m. CDT
- Game weather: Sunny
- Game attendance: 13,108
- Referee: Brandon Kirkland
- TV announcers (ESPN+): Malcolm Butler (play-by-play), Luke McCown (analyst) and Madison Kaufman (sideline)

Game information

First quarter

- NWST – Payne Williams III 33-yard field goal, 8:59. Demons 3–0. Drive: 11 plays, 49 yards, 6:01.
- LT – Jalen Mickens 75-yard pass from Blake Baker (Kaegan Kent kick), 8:48. Bulldogs 7–3. Drive: 1 play, 75 yards, 0:11.
- LT – Jay Wilkerson 27-yard pass from Blake Baker (Kaegan Kent kick), 7:52. Bulldogs 14–3. Drive: 3 plays, 38 yards, 0:51.
- LT – Talyn Shettron 16-yard pass from Joshua Brantley (Kaegan Kent kick), 4:04. Bulldogs 21–3. Drive: 6 plays, 48 yards, 2:17.

Second quarter

- LT –Dylone Brooks 28-yard run (Kaegan Kent kick), 13:48. Bulldogs 28–3. Drive: 8 plays, 75 yards, 2:56.
- LT – Talyn Shettron 37-yard run (Kaegan Kent kick), 11:25. Bulldogs 35–3. Drive: 2 plays, 49 yards, 0:51.
- LT – Eli Finley 9-yard pass from Blake Baker (Kaegan Kent kick), 7:51. Bulldogs 42–3. Drive: 6 plays, 46 yards, 1:55.
- LT – Dedrick Latulas 58-yard punt return (Kaegan Kent kick), 6:17. Bulldogs 49–3. Drive: 3 plays, -2 yards, 1:34.
- LT – Sergio Snider 2-yard run (Kaegan Kent kick), 4:05. Bulldogs 56–3. Drive: 3 plays, 8 yards, 1:14.
- LT – Jaden Miller 7-yard run (Kaegan Kent kick), 1:44. Bulldogs 63–3. Drive: 3 plays, 65 yards, 0:47.

Third quarter

- LT – Luke Watkins 35-yard pass from Trey Kukuk (Kaegan Kent kick), 13:22. Bulldogs 70–3. Drive: 4 plays, 60 yards, 1:32.
- LT – Dedrick Latulas 6-yard pass from Trey Kukuk (Hunter Rioux kick), 6:28. Bulldogs 77–3. Drive: 10 plays, 46 yards, 5:06.

Fourth quarter

- LT – Hunter Rioux 49-yard field goal, 8:56. Bulldogs 80–3. Drive: 6 plays, 23 yards, 2:12.
- NWST – Payne Williams III 37-yard field goal, 0:47. Bulldogs 80–6. Drive: 14 plays, 55 yards, 8:09.

Statistics	NWST	LT
First downs	7	23
Plays–yards	61–129	59–528
Rushes–yards	45–86	37–232
Passing yards	43	296
Passing: comp–att–int	5–16–1	17–22–0
Turnovers	1	0
Time of possession	35:08	24:52

Team	Category	Player	Statistics
Northwestern State	Passing	Abram Johnston	5/13, 43 yards, INT
Northwestern State	Rushing	Sage Ingram	13 carries, 48 yards
Northwestern State	Receiving	Dylan Rhodes	2 receptions, 25 yards
Louisiana Tech	Passing	Blake Baker	10/14, 222 yards, 3 TD
Louisiana Tech	Rushing	Trey Kukuk	5 carries, 50 yards
Louisiana Tech	Receiving	Jalen Mickens	3 receptions, 133 yards, TD

=== at East Texas A&M ===
Northwestern State Demons (0–2) at East Texas A&M Lions (0–2) – Game summary

Quarter	1	2	3	4	Total
Demons	0	0	0	0	0
Lions	0	0	0	0	0

at Ernest Hawkins Field at Memorial Stadium • Commerce, Texas

- Date: September 12
- Game time: 6:00 p.m. CDT
- Game attendance: 3,031
- TV: ESPN+

Game information

First quarter
Second quarter
Third quarter
Fourth quarter

Statistics	NWST	ETAM
First downs		
Plays–yards		
Rushes–yards		
Passing yards		
Passing: comp–att–int		
Turnovers		
Time of possession		

Team	Category	Player	Statistics
Northwestern State	Passing		
Northwestern State	Rushing		
Northwestern State	Receiving		
East Texas A&M	Passing		
East Texas A&M	Rushing		
East Texas A&M	Receiving		

=== at Weber State ===
Northwestern State Demons (0–3) at Weber State Wildcats (1–2) – Game summary

Quarter	1	2	3	4	Total
Demons	0	6	0	14	20
Wildcats	21	7	14	7	49

at Stewart Stadium • Ogden, Utah

- Date: September 19
- Game time: 7:00 p.m. CDT
- Game weather: Sunny • Temperature: 66 °F (19 °C) • Wind: NW 3 mph (4.8 km/h)
- Game attendance: 7,738
- Referee: Mike Bezner
- TV announcers (ESPN+): Mike Folta (play-by-play) and Riley Jensen (analyst)

Game information

First quarter

- WEB – 12:42 Marvin Session 71-yard pass from Nate Dahle (David Dellenbach kick). WEB 7–0. Drive: 6 plays, 51 yards, 2:10.
- WEB – 10:03 Tre Turner 67-yard return (David Dellenbach kick). WEB 14–0.
- WEB – 9:42 Spencer Ferguson 23-yard run (David Dellenbach kick). WEB 21–0. Drive: 2 plays, 23 yards, 0:15.

Second quarter

- NWST – 14:01 Brendan Webb 4-yard pass from Zach Wilke (Kick blocked). WEB 21–6. Drive: 9 plays, 50 yards, 3:20.
- WEB – 0:28 Seth Rigtrup 1-yard run (David Dellenbach kick). WEB 28–6. Drive: 10 plays, 61 yards, 2:57.

Third quarter

- WEB – 9:41 Seth Rigtrup 6-yard run (David Dellenbach kick). WEB 35–6. Drive: 8 plays, 55 yards, 2:43.
- WEB – 6:29 Ammon Munyer 37-yard pass from Nate Dahle (David Dellenbach kick). WEB 42–6. Drive: 3 plays, 80 yards, 1:19.

Fourth quarter

- NWST – 13:14 Joseph Moreland 5-yard pass from Zach Wilcke (Payne Williams III kick). WEB 42–13. Drive: 6 plays, 9 yards, 2:16.
- WEB – 10:36 Semisi Kinikini 1-yard run (David Dellenbach kick). WEB 49–13. Drive: 5 plays, 40 yards, 2:25.
- NWST – 6:18 Zay Davis 38-yard pass from Zach Wilcke (Payne Williams III kick). WEB 49–20. Drive: 10 plays, 75 yards, 4:18.

Statistics	NWST	WEB
First downs	22	24
Plays–yards	87–389	67–441
Rushes–yards	35–98	37–229
Passing yards	291	212
Passing: comp–att–int	26–52–0	14–26–2
Turnovers	0	2
Time of possession	33:26	26:34

Team	Category	Player	Statistics
Northwestern State	Passing	Zach Wilcke	26/52, 291 yards, 3 TD
Northwestern State	Rushing	Zach Wilcke	17 carries, 68 yards
Northwestern State	Receiving	Zay Davis	3 receptions, 66 yards, TD
Weber State	Passing	Nate Dahle	14/26, 178 yards, 2 TD, 2 INT
Weber State	Rushing	Seth Rigtrup	12 carries, 106 yards, 2 TD
Weber State	Receiving	Ammon Munyer	2 receptions, 36 yards, TD

=== Southeastern Louisiana (rivalry) ===
Southeastern Louisiana Lions (2–2) at Northwestern State Demons (0–4) – Game summary

Quarter	1	2	3	4	Total
Lions	0	0	0	0	0
Demons	0	0	0	0	0

at Harry Turpin Stadium • Natchitoches, Louisiana

- Date: September 26
- Game time: 6:00 p.m. CDT
- Game attendance: 1,792
- TV: ESPN+

Game information

First quarter
Second quarter
Third quarter
Fourth quarter

Statistics	SELA	NWST
First downs		
Plays–yards		
Rushes–yards		
Passing yards		
Passing: comp–att–int		
Turnovers		
Time of possession		

Team	Category	Player	Statistics
Southeastern Louisiana	Passing		
Southeastern Louisiana	Rushing		
Southeastern Louisiana	Receiving		
Northwestern State	Passing		
Northwestern State	Rushing		
Northwestern State	Receiving		

=== at No. 14 Lamar ===
Northwestern State Demons (0–5) at No. 14 Lamar Cardinals (3–1) – Game summary

Quarter	1	2	3	4	Total
Demons	0	0	0	0	0
No. 14 Cardinals	0	0	0	0	0

at Provost Umphrey Stadium • Beaumont, Texas

- Date: October 3
- Game time: 3:00 p.m. CDT
- Game attendance: 7,526
- TV: ESPN+

Game information

First quarter
Second quarter
Third quarter
Fourth quarter

Statistics	NWST	LAM
First downs		
Plays–yards		
Rushes–yards		
Passing yards		
Passing: comp–att–int		
Turnovers		
Time of possession		

Team	Category	Player	Statistics
Northwestern State	Passing		
Northwestern State	Rushing		
Northwestern State	Receiving		
Lamar	Passing		
Lamar	Rushing		
Lamar	Receiving		

=== McNeese (rivalry) ===
McNeese Cowboys (2–4) at Northwestern State Demons (0–6) – Game summary

Quarter	1	2	3	4	Total
Cowboys	0	0	0	0	0
Demons	0	0	0	0	0

at Harry Turpin Stadium • Natchitoches, Louisiana

- Date: October 17
- Game time: 12:00 p.m. CDT
- Game attendance: 2,341
- TV: ESPN+

Game information

First quarter
Second quarter
Third quarter
Fourth quarter

Statistics	MCN	NWST
First downs		
Plays–yards		
Rushes–yards		
Passing yards		
Passing: comp–att–int		
Turnovers		
Time of possession		

Team	Category	Player	Statistics
McNeese	Passing		
McNeese	Rushing		
McNeese	Receiving		
Northwestern State	Passing		
Northwestern State	Rushing		
Northwestern State	Receiving		

=== Nicholls (NSU Challenge) ===
Nicholls Colonels (2–5) at Northwestern State Demons (0–7) – Game summary

Quarter	1	2	3	4	Total
Colonels	0	0	0	0	0
Demons	0	0	0	0	0

at Harry Turpin Stadium • Natchitoches, Louisiana

- Date: October 24
- Game time: 2:00 p.m. CDT
- Game attendance: 3,081
- TV: ESPN+

Game information

First quarter
Second quarter
Third quarter
Fourth quarter

Statistics	NICH	NWST
First downs		
Plays–yards		
Rushes–yards		
Passing yards		
Passing: comp–att–int		
Turnovers		
Time of possession		

Team	Category	Player	Statistics
Nicholls	Passing		
Nicholls	Rushing		
Nicholls	Receiving		
Northwestern State	Passing		
Northwestern State	Rushing		
Northwestern State	Receiving		

=== at Incarnate Word ===
Northwestern State Demons (0–8) at Incarnate Word Cardinals (4–4) – Game summary

Quarter	1	2	3	4	Total
Demons	0	7	0	7	14
Cardinals	28	21	7	10	66

at Gayle and Tom Benson Stadium • San Antonio, Texas

- Date: October 31
- Game time: 4:00 p.m. CDT
- Game weather: Cloudy • Temperature: 73 °F (23 °C) • Wind: NE at 2 miles per hour (3.2 km/h)
- Game attendance: 2,057
- Referee: Gary Leeper
- TV announcers (ESPN+): Cooper Burns (play-by-play), EJ Sanchez (analyst) and Morgan Huizar (sideline)

Game information

First quarter

- UIW – 11:22 Jayden Hibbler 17 yard run, Nick Rigas kick
  UIW 7–0 Drive: 5 plays, 70 yards, 1:27
- UIW – 10:09 D'Arius Carmouche 29 yard interception return, Nick Rigas kick
  UIW 14–0
- UIW – 7:32 Jacob Emmers 28 yard pass from Emmett Brown, Nick Rigas kick
  UIW 21–0 Drive: 6 plays, 65 yards, 0:50
- UIW – 1:01 Lontrell Turner 5 yard run, Nick Rigas kick
  UIW 28–0 Drive: 5 plays, 35 yards, 1:10

Second quarter

- NSU – 11:40 Camryn Davis 17 yard pass from Zach Wilcke, Cooper Evans kick
  UIW 28–7 Drive: 10 plays, 75 yards, 4:21
- UIW – 9:56 Jamir Roberts 15 yard pass from Emmett Brown, Nick Rigas kick
  UIW 35–7 Drive: 6 plays, 67 yards, 1:44
- UIW – 8:06 Jayden Hibbler 52 yard run, Nick Rigas kick
  UIW 42–7 Drive: 2 plays, 57 yards, 0:27
- UIW – 0:57 Jayden Hibbler 16 yard run, Nick Rigas kick
  UIW 49–7 Drive: 3 plays, 63 yards, 0:34

Third quarter

- UIW – 2:29 Jamir Roberts 20 yard pass from David Rasor, Nick Rigas kick
  UIW 56–7 Drive: 3 plays, 29 yards, 0:43

Fourth quarter

- UIW – 12:06 Nick Rigas 44 yard field goal
  UIW 59–7 Drive: 6 plays, 18 yards, 2:36
- NSU – 8:28 Abram Johnston 1 yard run, Cooper Evans kick
  UIW 59–14 Drive: 9 plays, 75 yards, 3:38
- UIW – 2:08 Jackson Fields 14 yard run, Nick Rigas kick
  UIW 66–14 Drive: 10 plays, 61 yards, 6:20

Statistics	NWST	UIW
First downs	15	31
Plays–yards	71–207	79–566
Rushes–yards	35–40	35–167
Passing yards	167	399
Passing: comp–att–int	14–36–3	29–44–0
Turnovers	4	1
Time of possession	28:19	31:41

Team	Category	Player	Statistics
Northwestern State	Passing	Abram Johnston	5/11, 81 yards
Northwestern State	Rushing	Zach Wilcke	6 carries, 12 yards
Northwestern State	Receiving	Jake Peveto	2 receptions, 54 yards
Incarnate Word	Passing	Emmett Brown	21/32, 312 yards, 2 TD
Incarnate Word	Rushing	Jayden Hibbler	8 carries, 102 yards, 3 TD
Incarnate Word	Receiving	Roy Alexander	8 receptions, 173 yards

=== UT Rio Grande Valley ===
UT Rio Grande Valley Vaqueros (4–5) at Northwestern State Demons (0–9) – Game summary

Quarter	1	2	3	4	Total
Vaqueros	0	0	0	0	0
Demons	0	0	0	0	0

at Harry Turpin Stadium • Natchitoches, Louisiana

- Date: November 7
- Game time: 1:00 p.m. CDT
- Game attendance: 1,108
- TV: ESPN+

Game information

First quarter
Second quarter
Third quarter
Fourth quarter

Statistics	RGV	NWST
First downs		
Plays–yards		
Rushes–yards		
Passing yards		
Passing: comp–att–int		
Turnovers		
Time of possession		

Team	Category	Player	Statistics
UT Rio Grande Valley	Passing		
UT Rio Grande Valley	Rushing		
UT Rio Grande Valley	Receiving		
Northwestern State	Passing		
Northwestern State	Rushing		
Northwestern State	Receiving		

=== Houston Christian ===
Houston Christian Huskies (4–6) at Northwestern State Demons (0–10) – Game summary

Quarter	1	2	3	4	Total
Huskies	0	0	0	0	0
Demons	0	0	0	0	0

at Harry Turpin Stadium • Natchitoches, Louisiana

- Date: November 14
- Game time: 1:00 p.m. CDT
- Game attendance: 1,013
- TV: ESPN+

Game information

First quarter
Second quarter
Third quarter
Fourth quarter

Statistics	HCU	NWST
First downs		
Plays–yards		
Rushes–yards		
Passing yards		
Passing: comp–att–int		
Turnovers		
Time of possession		

Team	Category	Player	Statistics
Houston Christian	Passing		
Houston Christian	Rushing		
Houston Christian	Receiving		
Northwestern State	Passing		
Northwestern State	Rushing		
Northwestern State	Receiving		

=== at No. 5 Stephen F. Austin (Chief Caddo) ===
Northwestern State Demons (0–11) at No. 5 Stephen F. Austin Lumberjacks (10–1) – Game summary

Quarter	1	2	3	4	Total
Demons	0	0	0	0	0
No. 5 Lumberjacks	0	0	0	0	0

at Homer Bryce Stadium • Nacogdoches, Texas

- Date: November 19
- Game time: 6:00 p.m. CDT
- TV: ESPN+

Game information

First quarter
Second quarter
Third quarter
Fourth quarter

Statistics	NWST	SFA
First downs		
Plays–yards		
Rushes–yards		
Passing yards		
Passing: comp–att–int		
Turnovers		
Time of possession		

Team	Category	Player	Statistics
Northwestern State	Passing		
Northwestern State	Rushing		
Northwestern State	Receiving		
Stephen F. Austin	Passing		
Stephen F. Austin	Rushing		
Stephen F. Austin	Receiving		
