= 2026 Incarnate Word Cardinals football team =

American football team season

2026 Incarnate Word Cardinals football
- Conference: Southland Conference

Ranking
- STATS: No. 21
- FCS Coaches: No. 24
- Record: 8–4 (7–2 SLC)
- Head coach: Clint Killough (4th season)
- Offensive coordinator: Justin Bane (1st season)
- Offensive scheme: Air raid
- Defensive coordinator: Ben Olson (1st season)
- Base defense: 4–2–5
- Home stadium: Gayle and Tom Benson Stadium

2026 Southland Conference football standings
	Conf.			Overall
Team	W		L	W		L
No. 4 Lamar +^	8	–	1	10	–	2
No. 5 Stephen F. Austin +	8	–	1	11	–	1
No. 21 Incarnate Word	7	–	2	8	–	4
UT Rio Grande Valley	4	–	5	6	–	6
Southeastern Louisiana	4	–	5	6	–	6
Houston Christian	4	–	5	5	–	7
McNeese	4	–	5	5	–	7
Nicholls	3	–	6	4	–	8
East Texas A&M	3	–	6	3	–	9
Northwestern State	0	–	9	0	–	12
+ – Conference co-champions; ^ – FCS playoff participant; As of November 22, 2026; Rankings from STATS Poll

The 2026 Incarnate Word Cardinals football team represents the University of the Incarnate Word (UIW) as a member of the Southland Conference during the 2026 NCAA Division I FCS football season. The Cardinals play their home games at Gayle and Tom Benson Stadium in San Antonio, Texas. They are led by fourth-year head coach Clint Killough.

== Offseason ==
=== Transfers ===
==== Outgoing ====
Player	Position	Destination
Lawson Petty	OL	Baylor
Chedon James	WR	Idaho State
Barry Dillon	DB	Ohio
Caleb Flores	OL	Tarleton State
EJ Colson	QB	UTEP

==== Incoming ====
Player	Position	Previous school
Jameer Dudley	DB	Abilene Christian
Cedric Lott Jr.	WR	Boston College
Ryan Dirksen	OL	Bryant
Tyrece Fairly–Diyem	WR	Cal Poly
Mekhi Brown	DB	Carson–Newman
Emmett Brown	QB	Coastal Carolina
Walt Gray	LB	Coastal Carolina
Jabre Bevineau	WR	Gardner–Webb
Efren Jasso	P	Kansas
Joey Bryson	K	Maine
Chase Carter	DL	Memphis
Isaiah Blair	WR	New Mexico
Chance Symons	DL	North Dakota State
Bukari Miles Jr.	DB	Ohio State
Lamont Johnson-Burrell	WR	Sacramento State
Roy Alexander	WR	Texas Tech
Price Morgan	WR	Texas Tech
Jacob Emmers	WR	Tulsa
Buddha Garrett	DB	Tulsa
David Rasor	QB	UC Davis
Andres Barraza	OL	West Texas A&M
Easton Fulton	OL	West Texas A&M
Jayden Hibbler	RB	West Texas A&M
Zach Phipps	WR	West Texas A&M
Jamir Roberts	WR	West Texas A&M
Damashja Harris	RB	Wyoming

== Schedule ==
Date	Time	Opponent	Rank	Site	TV	Result	Attendance
August 29	6:00 p.m.	Oklahoma Panhandle State*		Gayle and Tom Benson Stadium; San Antonio, TX	ESPN+	W 76–14	3,054
September 12	3:00 p.m.	at No. 24 Northern Arizona*		Walkup Skydome; Flagstaff, AZ	ESPN+	L 28–38	9,457
September 19	6:00 p.m.	Houston Christian		Gayle and Tom Benson Stadium; San Antonio, TX	ESPN+	W 30–23 ^{OT}	2,626
September 26	5:00 p.m.	at Texas State*		UFCU Stadium; San Marcos, TX	USA	L 10–63	23,594
October 3	5:00 p.m.	at No. 7 Stephen F. Austin		Homer Bryce Stadium; Nacogdoches, TX	ESPN+	L 26–28	8,675
October 10	3:00 p.m.	at No. 11 Lamar		Provost Umphrey Stadium; Beaumont, TX	ESPN+	L 35–38	6,824
October 17	6:00 p.m.	UT Rio Grande Valley		Gayle and Tom Benson Stadium; San Antonio, TX	ESPN+	W 41–16	3,682
October 24	4:00 p.m.	McNeese		Gayle and Tom Benson Stadium; San Antonio, TX	ESPN+	W 38–6	2,501
October 31	4:00 p.m.	Northwestern State		Gayle and Tom Benson Stadium; San Antonio, TX	ESPN+	W 66–14	2,057
November 7	6:00 p.m.	at Southeastern Louisiana		Strawberry Stadium; Hammond, LA	ESPN+	W 35–16	4,671
November 14	3:00 p.m.	Nicholls^{†}	No. 22	Gayle and Tom Benson Stadium; San Antonio, TX	ESPN+	W 42–24	3,312
November 21	3:00 p.m.	at East Texas A&M	No. 21	Ernest Hawkins Field at Memorial Stadium; Commerce, TX	ESPN+	W 66–3	2,247
*Non-conference game; ^{†}Homecoming; Rankings from STATS Poll released prior to the game; All times are in Central time

== Personnel ==
=== Coaching staff ===
Name	Position	Alma mater	Joined staff
Clint Killough	Head coach	Incarnate Word (2015)	2018
Ben Olson	Defensive coordinator / linebackers	Eastern Illinois (2013)	2023
Justin Bane	Offensive coordinator / quarterbacks		2026
Willis White	Assistant head coach / wide receivers	Alabama State (2018)	2023
Nick Young	Offensive line / run game coordinator	Toledo (2012)	2023
Ashaad Mabry	Defensive line / run game coordinator	UTSA (2015)	2026
Darrin Walls	Cornerbacks / pass game coordinator	Notre Dame (2011)	2026
Cole McDowell	Tight ends / recruiting coordinator	West Alabama (2023)	2026
Adrian Duncan	Special teams coordinator / running backs	Abilene Christian	2026
Tre Spragg	Safeties	Incarnate Word (2015)	2023
Pete Robertson	Outside linebackers	Texas Tech (2015)	2026
John Scifers	Co-special teams coordinator / video coordinator	Incarnate Word (2021)	2023
Braden Strauss	Defensive quality control / assistant linebackers		2025
Cody Dunn	General manager	McGill (2021)	2022
Dalton Meyer	Director of player personnel	Incarnate Word (2023)	2025
Reagan Longoria	Director of on-campus recruiting	Texas A&M (2024)	2025
Tom Gilson	Head strength and conditioning coach		2026

=== Roster ===
2026 Incarnate Word Cardinals football
Quarterback: 8 David Rasor – (redshirt) Junior (6'1, 210); 9 Emmett Brown – (redshirt) Graduate Student (5'11, 190); 16 Jackson Fields – Freshman (6'2, 207); Running back: 1 Lontrell Turner – Senior (5'11, 190); 12 Jayden Hibbler – (redshirt) Sophomore (5'8, 180); 24 Damashja Harris – (redshirt) Graduate Student (6'2, 230); 25 Keyon Butler – (redshirt) Junior (6'2, 220); 29 Traveon Green – (redshirt) Freshman (5'9, 195); 36 William Taylor III – Freshman (5'9, 195); Wide receiver: 0 Jamir Roberts – (redshirt) Graduate Student (5'9, 175); 2 Isaiah Champagne – (redshirt) Freshman (5'10, 180); 4 Roy Alexander – (redshirt) Graduate Student (5'10, 205); 5 Zach Phipps – (redshirt) Junior (6'2, 200); 6 Jacob Emmers – Junior (6'0, 190); 7 Price Morgan – (redshirt) Senior (5'11, 190); 10 Isaiah Blair – Senior (5'11, 194); 13 Daniel Berry – Freshman (5'9, 168); 14 Patrick Bridges – (redshirt) Sophomore (6'1, 175); 15 Tyrece Fairly-Diyem – (redshirt) Senior (6'2, 220); 17 Jameson Garcia – (redshirt) Junior (6'1, 200); 19 Mikey Moshier – (redshirt) Freshman (6'2, 215); 21 Jabre Bevineau – (redshirt) Senior (6'3, 185); 37 Ernest Acuna – Freshman (6'1, 173); 38 James Montgomery – Freshman (5'11, 170); 83 Jackson Smith – (redshirt) Sophomore (5'7, 160); 84 Jackson Hancock – (redshirt) Sophomore (5'10, 170); Tight end: 11 Cedrick Lott Jr. – (redshirt) Sophomore (6'6, 230); 18 Amani Elfadil – Sophomore (6'3, 230); 45 Frank Riggins – (redshirt) Sophomore (6'4, 280); 46 Aidan Cardwell – (redshirt) Freshman (6'3, 230); 47 Dane Farley – (redshirt) Junior (6'1, 240); 89 Evan Drake – (redshirt) Freshman (6'5, 250); Long snapper: 52 Jonas Halbrook – Junior (6'2, 215); 53 Andis Halfmann – Freshman (5'10, 150)	Offensive line: 55 Kam Newhouse – OL – (redshirt) Freshman (6'3, 295); 56 Mike Stoker – T – (redshirt) Junior (6'6, 300); 58 Colton Carter – OL – (redshirt) Freshman (6'1, 300); 59 Johnavion Dees – OL – Freshman (6'3, 350); 62 Cutter Smith – OL – Freshman (6'2, 310); 63 Lamont Smith – OL – (redshirt) Freshman (6'3, 280); 64 Ozzy Garcia – OL – Senior (6'1, 300); 65 Easton Fulton – OL – (redshirt) Senior (6'4, 290); 66 Hayden Henry – OL – Freshman (6'3, 280); 67 Chase Burns – OL – (redshirt) Junior; 69 Andres Barraza – OL – (redshirt) Junior (6'4, 300); 71 Richard Grigg – T – Sophomore (6'5, 290); 73 Matthew Lewis – C – (redshirt) Freshman (6'3, 295); 74 Kunian Kuany – OL – (redshirt) Sophomore (6'3, 295); 75 Ryan Dirksen – OL – (redshirt) Graduate Student (6'6, 295); 76 Kali’I Leomiti – OL – Freshman (6'3, 300); 77 Dylan Kirby – T – (redshirt) Sophomore (6'6, 295); 78 Adam May – T – (redshirt) Sophomore (6'6, 300); 79 Christian Fitchett – T – (redshirt) Junior (6'5, 315); Defensive line: 5 Chase Carter – DL – (redshirt) Graduate Student (6'5, 295); 6 Jeremiah Young – DE – Junior (6'0, 255); 9 Terrell Elliott – DT – Senior (6'2, 305); 11 Chance Symons – DL – Senior (6'3, 250); 14 Walt Gray – DL – Senior (6'2, 235); 32 Tomsen Vickery – DE – (redshirt) Freshman (6'5, 255); 33 Marlon Cook – DL – Freshman (6'0, 290); 35 Curtis Hood – DL – (redshirt) Sophomore (6'1, 250); 40 Ben Bays – DL – Freshman (6'5, 240); 41 Justice Jordan – DL – Junior (6'2, 220); 42 Caleb Lewis – (redshirt) Graduate Student (6'2, 235); 44 Xavier Trotter – DL – Sophomore (6'3, 280); 45 Logan Granville – DE – (redshirt) Junior (6'3, 285); 50 Jace Bardwell – DT – (redshirt) Sophomore (6'2, 300); 69 David Brown – DT – (redshirt) Sophomore (6'1, 305); 91 Lloyd Johnson – DL – (redshirt) Senior (6'2, 295); 99 Josh Gonzalez – DT – (redshirt) Graduate Student (6'3, 315)	Linebacker: 0 Christian Barney – (redshirt) Junior (6'3, 235); 2 Jachai Pulley – Senior (6'1, 230); 4 Declan Williams – (redshirt) Graduate Student (6'2, 245); 15 Jerome Baker Jr. – (redshirt) Junior (6'2, 215); 20 Braden Hay – Graduate Student (6'2, 230); 22 Jabrelle Asberry – (redshirt) Freshman (6'0, 225); 30 Jordan Norwood – (redshirt) Senior (6'1, 230); 34 Leo Bisesi – (redshirt) Sophomore (6'0, 235); 43 Connor Corwin – Freshman (5'10, 195); Defensive back: 1 Mekhi Brown – DB – (redshirt) Graduate Student (6'3, 220); 3 Buddha Garrett – DB – Junior (6'0, 200); 7 Patrick Batiste – CB – (redshirt) Junior (6'0, 175); 8 A.J. Tisdell – DB – (redshirt) Junior (5'11, 195); 10 A.J. Williams – DB – (redshirt) Junior (6'2, 200); 12 Reece Sylvester – S – (redshirt) Senior (6'1, 200); 13 Rome Jeffers – DB – (redshirt) Freshman (6'0, 195); 16 Bukari Miles Jr. – DB – (redshirt) Sophomore (6'2, 195); 17 Kaden Jammer – DB – (redshirt) Sophomore (5'9, 180); 18 D'Arius Carmouche – CB – Senior (6'0, 170); 19 Isaiah Pruitt – DB – (redshirt) Sophomore (5'11, 195); 21 Keeson Wheeler – DB – (redshirt) Freshman (6'0, 190); 23 Lamont Johnson–Burrell – DB – Senior (6'3, 190); 24 Jameer Dudley – DB – (redshirt) Junior (6'2, 210); 25 Monty Hunt – DB – (redshirt) Graduate Student (6'0, 175); 26 Ethan Brown – DB – Freshman (6'0, 200); 27 Tyree Roberson – DB – Freshman (6'0, 175); 28 Tyrell Roberson – DB – Freshman (6'0, 185); 31 Pig Cage – S – Graduate Student (5'9, 200); 39 Ethan Chavez – DB – (redshirt) Freshman (5'10, 175); Kicker: 22 Joey Bryson – Graduate Student (5'10, 195); 49 Ethan Brumgard – Junior (5'11, 185); 95 Nick Rigas – Junior (6'0, 185); Punter: 48 Efren Jasso – Graduate Student (6'2, 245); Legend: (C) Team captain; (S) Suspended; (I) Ineligible; Injured; Redshirt

== Game summaries ==
=== Oklahoma Panhandle State (NAIA) ===
Uniform combination
Helmet	Jersey	Pants

Oklahoma Panhandle State Aggies (0–0) at Incarnate Word Cardinals (0–0) – Game summary

Quarter	1	2	3	4	Total
Aggies (NAIA)	0	0	7	7	14
Cardinals	41	21	7	7	76

at Gayle and Tom Benson Stadium • San Antonio, Texas

- Date: August 29
- Game time: 6:00 p.m.
- Game weather: Sunny • Temperature: 97 °F (36 °C) • Wind: SE at 9 miles per hour (14 km/h)
- Game attendance: 3,054
- Referee: Gary Leeper
- TV: ESPN+
- Box Score

Game information

First quarter

- UIW – Jayden Hibbler 58-yard punt return (Joey Bryson kick), 13:26. Cardinals 7–0.
- UIW – Price Morgan 22-yard pass from Emmett Brown (Nick Rigas kick), 11:26. Cardinals 14–0. Drive: 4 plays, 26 yards, 0:58.
- UIW – Lontrell Turner 40-yard run (Ethan Brumgard kick), 8:40. Cardinals 21–0. Drive: 2 plays, 42 yards, 0:50.
- UIW – Isaiah Champagne 51-yard pass from Emmett Brown (Joey Bryson kick), 5:03. Cardinals 28–0. Drive: 1 play, 51 yards, 0:09.
- UIW – Jeremiah Young 15-yard fumble return (Ethan Brumgard kick), 4:46. Cardinals 35–0.
- UIW – Jacob Emmers 48-yard pass from Emmett Brown (Ethan Brumgard kick failed), 1:22. Cardinals 41–0. Drive: 1 play, 48 yards, 0:10.

Second quarter

- UIW – Lontrell Turner 3-yard run (Joey Bryson kick), 5:03. Cardinals 48–0. Drive: 8 plays, 56 yards, 4:10.
- UIW – Jayden Hibbler 65-yard punt return (Nick Rigas kick), 2:55. Cardinals 55–0.
- UIW – Cedric Lott Jr. 12-yard pass from David Rasor (Ethan Brumgard kick), 1:46. Cardinals 62–0. Drive: 4 plays, 45 yards, 0:51.

Third quarter

- UIW – Jamir Roberts 6-yard pass from David Rasor (Joey Bryson kick), 9:54. Cardinals 69–0. Drive: 2 plays, 65 yards, 1:05.
- OPSU – David Zeller 25-yard pass from Harrison Hackbarth (Aaron Ortega kick), 7:06. Cardinals 69–7. Drive: 2 plays, 44 yards, 0:30.

Fourth quarter

- OPSU – Elijah Crook 13-yard pass from Harrsion Hackbarth (Aaron Ortega kick), 9:09. Cardinals 69–14. Drive: 9 plays, 71 yards, 9:25.
- UIW – Jackson Fields 3-yard run (Nick Rigas kick), 5:31. Cardinals 76–14. Drive: 8 plays, 34 yards, 3:29.

Statistics	OPSU	UIW
First downs	7	19
Plays–yards	53–157	51–474
Rushes–yards	26–(-15)	38–261
Passing yards	172	213
Passing: comp–att–int	17–27–0	9–13–1
Turnovers	1	2
Time of possession	32:46	27:14

Team	Category	Player	Statistics
Oklahoma Panhandle State	Passing	Harrison Hackbarth	7/8, 127 yards, 2 TD
Oklahoma Panhandle State	Rushing	Jeremy Hutcheson	6 carries, 20 yards
Oklahoma Panhandle State	Receiving	Elijah Crook	5 receptions, 89 yards, TD
Incarnate Word	Passing	Emmett Brown	5/7, 127 yards, 3 TD, INT
Incarnate Word	Rushing	Lontrell Turner	9 carries, 81 yards, 2 TD
Incarnate Word	Receiving	Jamir Roberts	3 receptions, 67 yards, TD

=== at No. 24 Northern Arizona ===
Uniform combination
Helmet	Jersey	Pants

Incarnate Word Cardinals (1–0) at No. 24 Northern Arizona Lumberjacks (1–1) – Game summary

Quarter	1	2	3	4	Total
Cardinals	7	0	7	14	28
No. 24 Lumberjacks	10	14	7	7	38

at Walkup Skydome • Flagstaff, Arizona

- Date: September 12
- Game time: 3:00 p.m.
- Game weather: Indoors
- Game attendance: 9,457
- Referee: Gregg Wilson
- TV: ESPN+
- Box Score

Game information

First quarter

- NAU – 3:52 Francisco Orduno Jr. 55 yard field goal
  NAU 3–0 Drive: 7 plays, 42 yards, 3:47
- UIW – 1:54 Jayden Hibbler 4 yard run, Joey Bryson kick
  UIW 7–3 Drive: 6 plays, 75 yards, 1:58
- NAU – 0:13 Kenveon Stone 4 yard run, Francisco Orduno Jr. kick
  NAU 10–7 Drive: 2 plays, 9 yards, 0:27

Second quarter

- NAU – 10:16 Kenveon Stone 28 yard run, Francisco Orduno Jr. kick
  NAU 17–7 Drive: 8 plays, 70 yards, 4:29
- NAU – 0:16 Myseth Currie 13 yard pass from Ty Pennington, Francisco Orduno Jr. kick
  NAU 24–7 Drive: 3 plays, 24 yards, 0:12

Third quarter

- UIW – 13:01 Zach Phipps 56 yard pass from Emmett Brown, Joey Bryson kick
  NAU 24–14 Drive: 3 plays, 60 yards, 1:04
- NAU – 4:04 Quran Gossett 30 yard run, Francisco Orduno Jr. kick
  NAU 31–14 Drive: 3 plays, 64 yards, 1:29

Fourth quarter

- UIW – 14:17 Damashja Harris 11 yard run, Joey Bryson kick
  NAU 31–21 Drive: 15 plays, 75 yards, 4:47
- NAU – 8:38 Jordan Pigram 47 yard fumble recovery, Francisco Orduno Jr. kick
  NAU 38–21
- UIW – 5:05 Lontrell Turner 5 yard run, Joey Bryson kick
  NAU 38–28 Drive: 12 plays, 75 yards, 3:33

Statistics	UIW	NAU
First downs	31	18
Plays–yards	94–606	63–333
Rushes–yards	41–176	38–180
Passing yards	430	153
Passing: comp–att–int	34–53–3	13–25–0
Turnovers	6	1
Time of possession	29:38	30:22

Team	Category	Player	Statistics
Incarnate Word	Passing	Emmett Brown	33/50, 426 yards, 1 TD, 2 INT
Incarnate Word	Rushing	Lontrell Turner	12 carries, 72 yards, 1 TD
Incarnate Word	Receiving	Zach Phipps	4 receptions, 125 yards, 1 TD
Northern Arizona	Passing	Ty Pennington	13/25, 153 yards, 1 TD
Northern Arizona	Rushing	Quran Gossett	17 carries, 105 yards, 1 TD
Northern Arizona	Receiving	Joey Stout	5 receptions, 84 yards

=== Houston Christian ===
Uniform combination
Helmet	Jersey	Pants

Houston Christian Huskies (2–1) at Incarnate Word Cardinals (1–1) – Game summary

Quarter	1	2	3	4	OT	Total
Huskies	7	3	3	10	0	23
Cardinals	7	13	0	3	7	30

at Gayle and Tom Benson Stadium • San Antonio, Texas

- Date: September 19
- Game time: 6:00 p.m.
- Game weather: Sunny • Temperature: 92 °F (33 °C) • Wind: SE at 6 miles per hour (9.7 km/h)
- Game attendance: 2,626
- Referee: James Bookhart
- TV: ESPN+
- Box Score

Game information

First quarter

- UIW – 10:25 Lontrell Turner 15 yard run, Joey Bryson kick
  UIW 7–0 Drive: 1 play, 15 yards, 0:03
- HCU – 7:48 Trayjen Llanas-Wilcox 7 yard pass from Cutter Stewart, Lukasz Smolen kick
  Tied 7–7 Drive: 9 plays, 75 yards, 2:37

Second quarter

- HCU – 13:45 Lukasz Smolen 41 yard field goal
  HCU 10–7 Drive: 8 plays, 15 yards, 3:06
- UIW – 9:38 David Rasor 3 yard run, kick failed
  UIW 13–10 Drive: 10 plays, 67 yards, 4:07
- UIW – 4:12 Emmett Brown 5 yard run, Joey Bryson kick
  UIW 20–10 Drive: 9 plays, 47 yards, 3:27

Third quarter

- HCU – 13:16 Lukasz Smolen 43 yard field goal
  UIW 20–13 Drive: 5 plays, 19 yards, 1:39

Fourth quarter

- HCU – 13:51 Lukasz Smolen 43 yard field goal
  UIW 20–16 Drive: 5 plays, 62 yards, 0:57
- HCU – 5:59 Ja'Ryan Wallace 53 yard pass from Maddox Kopp, Lukasz Smolen kick
  HCU 23–20 Drive: 9 plays, 80 yards, 4:18
- UIW – 2:24 Joey Bryson 24 yard field goal
  Tied 23–23 Drive: 10 plays, 58 yards, 3:28

Overtime

- UIW – 0:00 Emmett Brown 10 yard run, Joey Bryson kick
  UIW 30–23 Drive: 5 plays, 25 yards, 0:00

Statistics	HCU	UIW
First downs	15	28
Plays–yards	74–378	89–442
Rushes–yards	36–116	43–183
Passing yards	262	259
Passing: comp–att–int	19–38–0	30–46–1
Turnovers	1	3
Time of possession	21:50	38:10

Team	Category	Player	Statistics
Houston Christian	Passing	Maddox Kopp	9/16, 166 yards, 1 TD
Houston Christian	Rushing	Champ Dozier	20 carries, 86 yards
Houston Christian	Receiving	Ja'Ryan Wallace	5 receptions, 85 yards, 1 TD
Incarnate Word	Passing	Emmett Brown	30/46, 259 yards, 1 INT
Incarnate Word	Rushing	Jayden Hibbler	14 carries, 70 yards
Incarnate Word	Receiving	Isaiah Champagne	10 receptions, 113 yards

=== at Texas State (FBS) ===
Uniform combination
Helmet	Jersey	Pants

Incarnate Word Cardinals (2–1) at Texas State Bobcats (FBS) (1–2) – Game summary

Quarter	1	2	3	4	Total
Cardinals	7	3	0	0	10
Bobcats (FBS)	28	14	0	21	63

at UFCU Stadium • San Marcos, Texas

- Date: September 26
- Game time: 5:00 p.m.
- Game weather: Sunny
- Game attendance: 23,594
- Referee: Gary Reed
- TV announcers (USA): Nate Gatter (play-by-play), Ryan Leaf (analyst) and Lauren Green (sideline)
- Box Score

Game information

First quarter

- (13:26) TXST - Beau Sparks 63-yard pass from Brad Jackson (Jacob Bonilla kick), (Drive: 4 plays, 80 yards, 1:28; Texas State 7-0)
- (10:55) UIW - Roy Alexander 32-yard pass from Emmett Brown (Nick Rigas kick), (Drive: 7 plays, 75 yards, 2:31; Tied 7-7)
- (9:07) TXST - Jordan Martin 10-yard pass from Brad Jackson (Jacob Bonilla kick), (Drive: 4 plays, 84 yards, 1:42; Texas State 14-7)
- (6:30) TXST - Davian Jackson 6-yard pass from Brad Jackson (Jacob Bonilla kick), (Drive: 6 plays, 31 yards, 1:51; Texas State 21-7)
- (2:22) TXST - Torrance Burgess Jr. 46-yard run (Jacob Bonilla kick), (Drive: 6 plays, 88 yards, 2:01; Texas State 28-7)

Second quarter

- (10:42) TXST - Chris Dawn Jr. 6-yard pass from Brad Jackson (Jacob Bonilla kick), (Drive: 12 plays, 73 yards, 4:45; Texas State 35-7)
- (2:44) TXST - Zechariah Sample 69-yard pass from Brad Jackson (Jacob Bonilla kick), (Drive: 4 plays, 80 yards, 1:27; Texas State 42-7)
- (0:00) UIW - Nick Rigas 23-yard field goal, (Drive: 16 plays, 70 yards, 2:43; Texas State 42-10)

Third quarter

- No scoring plays

Fourth quarter

- (12:18) TXST - La'Keyleon Graves 49-yard pass from Gavin Parkhurst (Jacob Bonilla kick), (Drive: 2 plays, 68 yards, 0:36; Texas State 49-10)
- (3:46) TXST - Juntavious Harris 45-yard run (Jacob Bonilla kick), (Drive: 3 plays, 72 yards, 1:27; Texas State 56-10)
- (1:39) TXST - Dameon Crowe 77-yard punt return (Jacob Bonilla kick), (Drive: 3 plays, 5 yards, 1:59; Texas State 63-10)

Statistics	UIW	TXST
First downs	23	25
Plays–yards	90–358	69–658
Rushes–yards	37–75	46–338
Passing yards	283	320
Passing: comp–att–int	29–53–2	20–23–0
Turnovers	2	1
Time of possession	30:27	29:33

Team	Category	Player	Statistics
Incarnate Word	Passing	Emmett Brown	24/44, 242 yards, TD, INT
Incarnate Word	Rushing	Lontrell Turner	5 carries, 23 yards
Incarnate Word	Receiving	Roy Alexander	3 receptions, 67 yards, TD
Texas State	Passing	Brad Jackson	17/20, 244 yards, 5 TD
Texas State	Rushing	Torrance Burgess Jr.	9 carries, 140 yards, TD
Texas State	Receiving	Zechariah Sample	4 receptions, 92 yards, TD

=== at No. 7 Stephen F. Austin ===
Uniform combination
Helmet	Jersey	Pants

Incarnate Word Cardinals (2–2) at No. 7 Stephen F. Austin Lumberjacks (5–0) – Game summary

Quarter	1	2	3	4	Total
Cardinals	3	10	7	6	26
No. 7 Lumberjacks	14	0	7	7	28

at Homer Bryce Stadium • Nacogdoches, Texas

- Date: October 3
- Game time: 5:00 p.m.
- Game weather: Cloudy • Temperature: 82 °F (28 °C) • Wind: SW at 9 miles per hour (14 km/h)
- Game attendance: 8,675
- Referee: Matt Beck
- TV announcers (ESPN+): Rob Meyers (play-by-play), Hunter Taylor (analyst) and Nicole Beckelman (sideline)
- Box Score

Game information

First quarter

- SFA – 13:39 Jaylen Jenkins 45 yard pass from Gavin Rutherford, Carlos Alvarado kick
  SFA 7–0 Drive: 3 plays, 65 yards, 1:02
- UIW – 10:35 Nick Rigas 39 yard field goal
  SFA 7–3 Drive: 10 plays, 67 yards, 3:04
- SFA – 0:55 JT Kitna 2 yard run, Carlos Alvarado kick
  SFA 14–3 Drive: 8 plays, 55 yards, 3:00

Second quarter

- UIW – 13:08 Nick Rigas 43 yard field goal
  SFA 14–6 Drive: 9 plays, 50 yards, 2:47
- UIW – 5:44 Isaiah Champagne 10 yard pass from Emmett Brown, Nick Rigas kick
  SFA 14–13 Drive: 5 plays, 63 yards, 1:55

Third quarter

- UIW – 8:35 David Rasor 1 yard run, Nick Rigas kick
  UIW 20–14 Drive: 10 plays, 70 yards, 4:28
- SFA – 4:07 Preston Alford 8 yard pass from Gavin Rutherford, Carlos Alvarado kick
  SFA 21–20 Drive: 3 plays, 56 yards, 0:41

Fourth quarter

- SFA – 14:55 Clayton Wayland 8 yard pass from Gavin Rutherford, Carlos Alvarado kick
  SFA 28–20 Drive: 7 plays, 82 yards, 2:52
- UIW – 0:22 Jacob Emmers 53 yard pass from Emmett Brown, 2-point conversion failed
  SFA 28–26 Drive: 4 plays, 75 yards, 0:26

Statistics	UIW	SFA
First downs	26	24
Plays–yards	79–470	73–425
Rushes–yards	27–98	39–134
Passing yards	372	291
Passing: comp–att–int	27–52–2	26–34–1
Turnovers	2	1
Time of possession	27:38	32:22

Team	Category	Player	Statistics
Incarnate Word	Passing	Emmett Brown	27/52, 372 yards, 2 TD, 2 INT
Incarnate Word	Rushing	Jayden Hibbler	8 carries, 57 yards
Incarnate Word	Receiving	Jameson Garcia	4 receptions, 86 yards
Stephen F. Austin	Passing	Gavin Rutherford	26/34, 291 yards, 3 TD, INT
Stephen F. Austin	Rushing	Jeffery Jones	14 carries, 70 yards
Stephen F. Austin	Receiving	Clayton Wayland	5 receptions, 104 yards, TD

=== at No. 11 Lamar ===
Uniform combination
Helmet	Jersey	Pants

Incarnate Word Cardinals (2–3) at No. 11 Lamar Cardinals (4–1) – Game summary

Quarter	1	2	3	4	Total
Incarnate Word	0	14	7	14	35
No. 11 Lamar	10	14	7	7	38

at Provost Umphrey Stadium • Beaumont, Texas

- Date: October 10
- Game time: 3:00 p.m.
- Game weather: Sunny • Temperature: 87 °F (31 °C)
- Game attendance: 6,824
- Referee: James Brookhart
- TV: ESPN+
- Box Score

Game information

First quarter

- LU – 7:55 Andres Sandoval 32 yard field goal
  LU 3–0 Drive: 11 plays, 62 yards, 5:29
- LU – 0:43 Jojo Uga 25 yard run, Andres Sandoval kick
  LU 10–0 Drive: 7 plays, 72 yards, 3:31

Second quarter

- UIW – 13:25 Jayden Hibbler 10 yard run, Nick Rigas kick
  LU 10–7 Drive: 7 plays, 51 yards, 2:08
- LU – 11:17 Jojo Uga 57 yard run, Andres Sandoval kick
  LU 17–7 Drive: 4 plays, 75 yards, 2:08
- LU – 7:32 Jojo Uga 4 yard run, Andres Sandoval kick
  LU 24–7 Drive: 7 plays, 25 yards, 3:39
- UIW – 0:11 Emmett Brown 9 yard run, Nick Rigas kick
  LU 24–14 Drive: 10 plays, 77 yards, 3:35

Third quarter

- LU – 13:43 Parker Jenkins 62 yard run, Andres Sandoval kick
  LU 31–14 Drive: 4 plays, 75 yards, 1:11
- UIW – 12:40 Jacob Emmers 74 yard pass from Emmett Brown, Nick Rigas kick
  LU 31–21 Drive: 4 plays, 90 yards, 0:59

Fourth quarter

- LU – 14:57 Davin Driskell 3 yard pass from Aiden McCown, Andres Sandoval kick
  LU 38–21 Drive: 5 plays, 23 yards, 2:30
- UIW – 12:45 Patrick Batiste 58 yard fumble recovery, Nick Rigas kick
  LU 38–28
- UIW – 5:02 Tyrece Fairly–Diyem 5 yard pass from Emmett Brown, Nick Rigas kick
  LU 38–35 Drive: 12 plays, 61 yards, 3:48

Statistics	UIW	LU
First downs	19	18
Plays–yards	66–386	69–398
Rushes–yards	27–83	47–275
Passing yards	303	123
Passing: comp–att–int	26–39–0	12–22–0
Turnovers	3	1
Time of possession	23:20	36:40

Team	Category	Player	Statistics
Incarnate Word	Passing	Emmett Brown	26/39, 303 yards, 2 TD
Incarnate Word	Rushing	Emmett Brown	16 carries, 50 yards, TD
Incarnate Word	Receiving	Jacob Emmers	7 receptions, 104 yards, TD
Lamar	Passing	Aiden McCown	12/22, 123 yards, TD
Lamar	Rushing	Jojo Uga	22 carries, 144 yards, 3 TD
Lamar	Receiving	Blake Thomas	3 receptions, 47 yards

=== UT Rio Grande Valley ===
Uniform combination
Helmet	Jersey	Pants

UT Rio Grande Valley Vaqueros (3–3) at Incarnate Word Cardinals (2–4) – Game summary

Quarter	1	2	3	4	Total
Vaqueros	3	7	0	6	16
Cardinals	10	17	7	7	41

at Gayle and Tom Benson Stadium • San Antonio, Texas

- Date: October 17
- Game time: 6:00 p.m.
- Game weather: Sunny • Temperature: 68 °F (20 °C) • Wind: NE at 6 miles per hour (9.7 km/h)
- Game attendance: 3,682
- Referee: Matt Beck
- TV: ESPN+
- Box Score

Game information

First quarter

- UIW – 14:14 Lontrell Turner 2 yard run, Nick Rigas kick
  UIW 7–0 Drive: 6 plays, 40 yards, 0:39
- UTRGV – 11:48 Brysen Gardner 37 yard field goal
  UIW 7–3 Drive: 9 plays, 55 yards, 2:26
- UIW – 4:30 Nick Rigas 22 yard field goal
  UIW 10–3 Drive: 4 plays, 7 yards, 1:50

Second quarter

- UTRGV – 14:49 Corey Holmes 17 yard pass from Aidan Jakobsohn, Brysen Gardner kick
  Tied 10–10 Drive: 10 plays, 73 yards, 4:33
- UIW – 6:06 Jayden Hibbler 15 yard pass from Emmett Brown, Nick Rigas kick
  UIW 17–10 Drive: 5 plays, 35 yards, 1:42
- UIW – 1:56 Nick Rigas 33 yard field goal
  UIW 20–10 Drive: 8 plays, 50 yards, 2:04
- UIW – 1:39 Roy Alexander 3 yard run, Nick Rigas kick
  UIW 27–10 Drive: 1 play, 3 yards, 0:06

Third quarter

- UIW – 12:39 Damashja Harris 2 yard run, Nick Rigas kick
  UIW 34–10 Drive: 9 plays, 75 yards, 2:21

Fourth quarter

- UTRGV – 11:56 TJ Dement 2 yard run, 2–point conversion failed
  UIW 34–16 Drive: 8 plays, 80 yards, 4:32
- UIW – 4:15 Damashja Harris 12 yard run, Nick Rigas kick
  UIW 41–16 Drive: 12 plays, 75 yards, 7:41

Statistics	UTRGV	UIW
First downs	22	24
Plays–yards	76–331	70–394
Rushes–yards	29–56	37–201
Passing yards	275	193
Passing: comp–att–int	29–47–3	21–33–1
Turnovers	4	2
Time of possession	32:43	27:17

Team	Category	Player	Statistics
UT Rio Grande Valley	Passing	Aidan Jakobsohn	27/45, 255 yards, TD, 3 INT
UT Rio Grande Valley	Rushing	TJ Dement	10 carries, 30 yards, TD
UT Rio Grande Valley	Receiving	Clint Thomas, Jr.	4 receptions, 82 yards
Incarnate Word	Passing	Emmett Brown	21/33, 193 yards, TD, INT
Incarnate Word	Rushing	Jayden Hibbler	14 carries, 95 yards
Incarnate Word	Receiving	Jayden Hibbler	7 receptions, 92 yards, TD

=== McNeese ===
Uniform combination
Helmet	Jersey	Pants

McNeese Cowboys (3–4) at Incarnate Word Cardinals (3–4) – Game summary

Quarter	1	2	3	4	Total
Cowboys	0	6	0	0	6
Cardinals	7	21	0	10	38

at Gayle and Tom Benson Stadium • San Antonio, Texas

- Date: October 24
- Game time: 4:00 p.m.
- Game weather: Cloudy • Temperature: 84 °F (29 °C) • Wind: SE at 11 miles per hour (18 km/h)
- Game attendance: 2,501
- Referee: Austin Mezzacasa
- TV: ESPN+
- Box Score

Game information

First quarter

- UIW – 14:24 Dane Farley 27 yard pass from Emmett Brown, Nick Rigas kick
  UIW 7–0 Drive: 1 play, 27 yards, 0:08

Second quarter

- UIW – 2:05 Roy Alexander 29 yard pass from Emmett Brown, Nick Rigas kick
  UIW 14–0 Drive: 8 plays, 72 yards, 2:53
- UIW – 1:31 Jacob Emmers 56 yard pass from Emmett Brown, Nick Rigas kick
  UIW 21–0 Drive: 1 play, 56 yards, 0:07
- MCN – 0:59 Reed Boyd 31 yard pass from Brady Barrier, Hutch Swilley rush attempt failed
  UIW 21–6 Drive: 2 plays, 75 yards, 0:32
- UIW – 0:05 Isaiah Champagne 26 yard pass from Emmett Brown, Nick Rigas kick
  UIW 28–6 Drive: 6 plays, 75 yards, 0:54

Fourth quarter

- UIW – 13:36 Emmett Brown 38 yard run, Nick Rigas kick
  UIW 35–6 Drive: 6 plays, 72 yards, 3:00
- UIW – 7:50 Nick Rigas 25 yard field goal
  UIW 38–6 Drive: 9 plays, 36 yards, 4:11

Statistics	MCN	UIW
First downs	13	26
Plays–yards	66–283	70–513
Rushes–yards	39–160	43–226
Passing yards	123	287
Passing: comp–att–int	12–27–1	20–27–0
Turnovers	2	0
Time of possession	28:20	31:40

Team	Category	Player	Statistics
McNeese	Passing	Brady Barrier	10/17, 127 yards, TD, INT
McNeese	Rushing	Marquez Davis	7 carries, 63 yards
McNeese	Receiving	Elisha Edwards	3 receptions, 48 yards
Incarnate Word	Passing	Emmett Brown	19/26, 283 yards, 4 TD
Incarnate Word	Rushing	Emmett Brown	10 carries, 72 yards, TD
Incarnate Word	Receiving	Roy Alexander	3 receptions, 67 yards, TD

=== Northwestern State ===
Uniform combination
Helmet	Jersey	Pants

Northwestern State Demons (0–8) at Incarnate Word Cardinals (4–4) – Game summary

Quarter	1	2	3	4	Total
Demons	0	7	0	7	14
Cardinals	28	21	7	10	66

at Gayle and Tom Benson Stadium • San Antonio, Texas

- Date: October 31
- Game time: 4:00 p.m.
- Game weather: Cloudy • Temperature: 73 °F (23 °C) • Wind: NE at 2 miles per hour (3.2 km/h)
- Game attendance: 2,057
- Referee: Gary Leeper
- TV announcers (ESPN+): Cooper Burns (play-by-play), EJ Sanchez (analyst) and Morgan Huizar (sideline)
- Box Score

Game information

First quarter

- UIW – 11:22 Jayden Hibbler 17 yard run, Nick Rigas kick
  UIW 7–0 Drive: 5 plays, 70 yards, 1:27
- UIW – 10:09 D'Arius Carmouche 29 yard interception return, Nick Rigas kick
  UIW 14–0
- UIW – 7:32 Jacob Emmers 28 yard pass from Emmett Brown, Nick Rigas kick
  UIW 21–0 Drive: 6 plays, 65 yards, 0:50
- UIW – 1:01 Lontrell Turner 5 yard run, Nick Rigas kick
  UIW 28–0 Drive: 5 plays, 35 yards, 1:10

Second quarter

- NSU – 11:40 Camryn Davis 17 yard pass from Zach Wilcke, Cooper Evans kick
  UIW 28–7 Drive: 10 plays, 75 yards, 4:21
- UIW – 9:56 Jamir Roberts 15 yard pass from Emmett Brown, Nick Rigas kick
  UIW 35–7 Drive: 6 plays, 67 yards, 1:44
- UIW – 8:06 Jayden Hibbler 52 yard run, Nick Rigas kick
  UIW 42–7 Drive: 2 plays, 57 yards, 0:27
- UIW – 0:57 Jayden Hibbler 16 yard run, Nick Rigas kick
  UIW 49–7 Drive: 3 plays, 63 yards, 0:34

Third quarter

- UIW – 2:29 Jamir Roberts 20 yard pass from David Rasor, Nick Rigas kick
  UIW 56–7 Drive: 3 plays, 29 yards, 0:43

Fourth quarter

- UIW – 12:06 Nick Rigas 44 yard field goal
  UIW 59–7 Drive: 6 plays, 18 yards, 2:36
- NSU – 8:28 Abram Johnston 1 yard run, Cooper Evans kick
  UIW 59–14 Drive: 9 plays, 75 yards, 3:38
- UIW – 2:08 Jackson Fields 14 yard run, Nick Rigas kick
  UIW 66–14 Drive: 10 plays, 61 yards, 6:20

Statistics	NSU	UIW
First downs	15	31
Plays–yards	71–207	79–566
Rushes–yards	35–40	35–167
Passing yards	167	399
Passing: comp–att–int	14–36–3	29–44–0
Turnovers	4	1
Time of possession	28:19	31:41

Team	Category	Player	Statistics
Northwestern State	Passing	Abram Johnston	5/11, 81 yards
Northwestern State	Rushing	Zach Wilcke	6 carries, 12 yards
Northwestern State	Receiving	Jake Peveto	2 receptions, 54 yards
Incarnate Word	Passing	Emmett Brown	21/32, 312 yards, 2 TD
Incarnate Word	Rushing	Jayden Hibbler	8 carries, 102 yards, 3 TD
Incarnate Word	Receiving	Roy Alexander	8 receptions, 173 yards

=== at Southeastern Louisiana ===
Uniform combination
Helmet	Jersey	Pants

Incarnate Word Cardinals (5–4) at Southeastern Louisiana Lions (4–5) – Game summary

Quarter	1	2	3	4	Total
Cardinals	14	7	0	14	35
Lions	3	0	13	0	16

at Strawberry Stadium • Hammond, Louisiana

- Date: November 7
- Game time: 6:00 p.m.
- Game weather: Sunny • Temperature: 65 °F (18 °C) • Wind: N at 7 miles per hour (11 km/h)
- Game attendance: 4,671
- Referee: Austin Mezzacasa
- TV announcers (ESPN+): David Keller (play-by-play) & Logan Loving (analyst)
- Box Score

Game information

First quarter

- UIW – 11:37 Emmett Brown 5 yard run, Nick Rigas kick
  UIW 7–0 Drive: 10 plays, 65 yards, 3:18
- SLU – 6:17 Drew Talley 24 yard field goal
  UIW 7–3 Drive: 12 plays, 63 yards, 5:20
- UIW – 2:16 Lontrell Turner 1 yard run, Nick Rigas kick
  UIW 14–3 Drive: 9 plays, 83 yards, 3:57

Second quarter

- UIW – 10:39 Roy Alexander 23 yard pass from Emmett Brown, Nick Rigas kick
  UIW 21–3 Drive: 10 plays, 84 yards, 4:07

Third quarter

- SLU – 14:46 Blake Smith 97 yard kickoff return, Drew Talley kick
  UIW 21–10
- SLU – 9:16 Drew Talley 51 yard field goal
  UIW 21–13 Drive: 6 plays, 51 yards, 3:18
- SLU – 0:00 Drew Talley 29 yard field goal
  UIW 21–16 Drive: 12 plays, 51 yards, 5:55

Fourth quarter

- UIW – 13:17 Lontrell Turner 9 yard run, Nick Rigas kick
  UIW 28–16 Drive: 6 plays, 75 yards, 1:43
- UIW – 7:13 Jayden Hibbler 4 yard run, Nick Rigas kick
  UIW 35–16 Drive: 4 plays, 70 yards, 2:05

Statistics	UIW	SLU
First downs	29	16
Plays–yards	72–546	59–255
Rushes–yards	47–252	33–107
Passing yards	294	148
Passing: comp–att–int	18–25–1	13–26–1
Turnovers	1	1
Time of possession	31:28	28:32

Team	Category	Player	Statistics
Incarnate Word	Passing	Emmett Brown	18/25, 294 yards, TD, INT
Incarnate Word	Rushing	Jayden Hibbler	18 carries, 134 yards, TD
Incarnate Word	Receiving	Roy Alexander	6 receptions, 172 yards, TD
Southeastern Louisiana	Passing	Kyle Lowe	10/21, 143 yards
Southeastern Louisiana	Rushing	Kyle Lowe	11 carries, 58 yards
Southeastern Louisiana	Receiving	Dkhai Joseph	5 receptions, 82 yards

=== Nicholls ===
Uniform combination
Helmet	Jersey	Pants

Nicholls Colonels (4–6) at No. 22 Incarnate Word Cardinals (6–4) – Game summary

Quarter	1	2	3	4	Total
Colonels	7	10	7	0	24
No. 22 Cardinals	14	7	7	14	42

at Gayle and Tom Benson Stadium • San Antonio, Texas

- Date: November 14
- Game time: 2:00 p.m.
- Game weather: Sunny • Temperature: 64 °F (18 °C) • Wind: NE at 9 miles per hour (14 km/h)
- Game attendance: 3,312
- Referee: James Brookhart
- TV: ESPN+
- Box Score

Game information

First quarter

- UIW – 13:12 Jayden Hibbler 17 yard run, Nick Rigas kick
  UIW 7–0 Drive: 7 plays, 65 yards, 1:48
- UIW – 6:31 Jacob Emmers 35 yard pass from Emmett Brown, Nick Rigas kick
  UIW 14–0 Drive: 6 plays, 82 yards, 2:25
- NICH – 1:33 Chase Richardson 33 yard run, Kingston Phan kick
  UIW 14–7 Drive: 9 plays, 75 yards, 4:58

Second quarter

- NICH – 10:01 Kingston Phan 35 yard field goal
  UIW 14–10 Drive: 14 plays, 36 yards, 6:30
- UIW – 7:04 Lontrell Turner 6 yard run, Nick Rigas kick
  UIW 21–10 Drive: 7 plays, 68 yards, 2:52
- NICH – 0:33 Devin Scura 28 yard pass from Preston Welch, Kingston Phan kick
  UIW 21–17 Drive: 6 plays, 80 yards, 1:16

Third quarter

- NICH – 10:56 Charlie Diedrich 7 yard interception return, Kingston Phan kick
  NICH 24–21
- UIW – 2:26 Dane Farley 4 yard pass from Emmett Brown, Nick Rigas kick
  UIW 28–24 Drive: 10 plays, 39 yards, 3:40

Fourth quarter

- UIW – 11:21 Isaiah Champagne 36 yard pass from Emmett Brown, Nick Rigas kick
  UIW 35–24 Drive: 8 plays, 79 yards, 2:47
- UIW – 1:59 Damashja Harris 5 yard run, Nick Rigas kick
  UIW 42–24 Drive: 10 plays, 58 yards, 3:43

Statistics	NICH	UIW
First downs	19	24
Plays–yards	75–385	69–433
Rushes–yards	51–263	45–233
Passing yards	122	200
Passing: comp–att–int	10–24–2	15–24–1
Turnovers	4	2
Time of possession	35:32	24:28

Team	Category	Player	Statistics
Nicholls	Passing	Preston Welch	5/17, 105 yards, TD, 2 INT
Nicholls	Rushing	Patrick Gales	19 carries, 88 yards
Nicholls	Receiving	Greg Donaldson	1 reception, 45 yards
Incarnate Word	Passing	Emmett Brown	15/24, 200 yards, 3 TD, INT
Incarnate Word	Rushing	Jayden Hibbler	20 carries, 115 yards, TD
Incarnate Word	Receiving	Roy Alexander	6 receptions, 79 yards

=== at East Texas A&M ===
Uniform combination
Helmet	Jersey	Pants

No. 21 Incarnate Word Cardinals (7–4) at East Texas A&M Lions (3–8) – Game summary

Quarter	1	2	3	4	Total
No. 21 Cardinals	0	0	0	0	0
Lions	0	0	0	0	0

at Ernest Hawkins Field at Memorial Stadium • Commerce, Texas

- Date: November 21
- Game time: 3:00 p.m.
- TV: ESPN+

Game information

First quarter
Second quarter
Third quarter
Fourth quarter

Statistics	UIW	ETAM
First downs		
Plays–yards		
Rushes–yards		
Passing yards		
Passing: comp–att–int		
Turnovers		
Time of possession		

Team	Category	Player	Statistics
Incarnate Word	Passing		
Incarnate Word	Rushing		
Incarnate Word	Receiving		
East Texas A&M	Passing		
East Texas A&M	Rushing		
East Texas A&M	Receiving		
