= Emmett Brown (American football) =

American football player (born 2003)

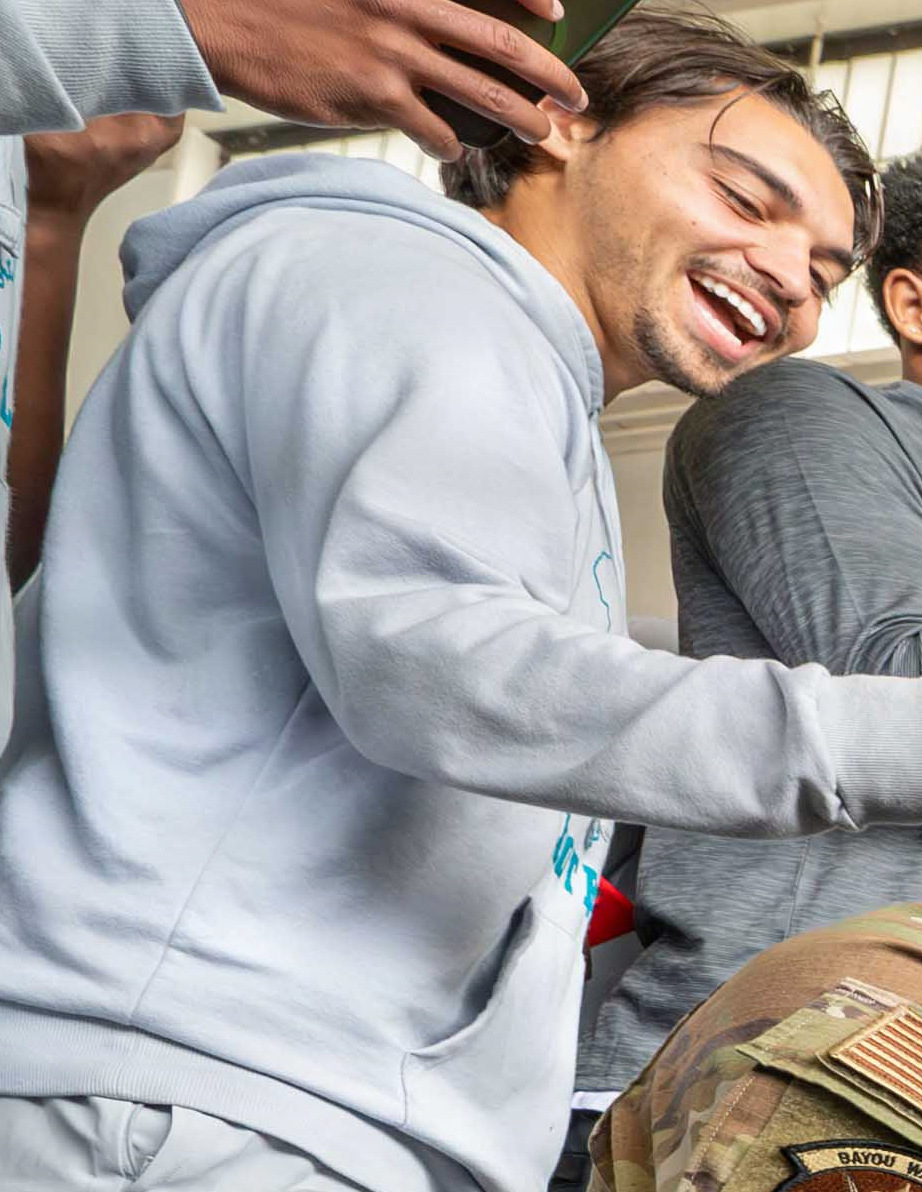
- Brown in 2025

No. 9 – Incarnate Word Cardinals
- Position: Quarterback
- Class: Redshirt Junior

Personal information
- Born: August 18, 2003 (age 23); La Jolla, California, U.S.
- Listed height: 5 ft 11 in (1.80 m)
- Listed weight: 190 lb (86 kg)

Career information
- High school: San Marcos (San Marcos, California) Rancho Verde (Moreno Valley, California)
- College: Washington State (2022–2023); San Jose State (2024); Coastal Carolina (2025); Incarnate Word (2026–present)
- Stats at ESPN

Emmett Brown (born August 18, 2003) is an American college football quarterback who currently plays for the Incarnate Word Cardinals. He previously played for the Washington State Cougars, San Jose State Spartans and Coastal Carolina Chanticleers.

== Early life ==
Brown attended San Marcos High School in San Marcos, California, and joined the Washington State Cougars to play college football as a preferred walk-on.

== College career ==
=== Washington State ===
As a freshman in 2022, Brown was redshirted and did not appear in any games. In 2023, he played just one game completing two of four passes for 14 yards and an interception. After the season, Brown entered his name into the NCAA transfer portal.

=== San Jose State ===
Brown transferred to play for the San Jose State Spartans. He opened the 2024 season as the team's starter, completing 20 of 34 pass attempts for 298 yards and three touchdowns in the season-opening win. In week 2, Brown completed 17 of 32 passes for 262 yards and two touchdowns in a win over Air Force.

=== Coastal Carolina ===
On January 9, 2025, Brown transferred to Coastal Carolina.

=== Incarnate Word ===
After missing the entire 2025 season with Coastal Carolina due to injury, Brown entered the transfer portal once again and signed with the Incarnate Word Cardinals in June 2026.

=== Statistics ===
Year	Team	Games			Passing								Rushing			
Year	Team	GP	GS	Record	Cmp	Att	Pct	Yds	Avg	TD	INT	Rtg	Att	Yds	Avg	TD
2022	Washington State	Redshirt (redshirt)														
2023	Washington State	1	0	—	2	4	50.0	14	3.5	0	1	29.4	0	0	0.0	0
2024	San Jose State	8	6	4–2	125	217	57.6	1,621	7.5	16	5	140.1	26	-23	-0.9	1
2025	Coastal Carolina	Did not play due to injury														
2026	Incarnate Word	11	11	7–4	239	378	63.2	3,010	8.0	20	10	142.7	98	289	2.9	5
Career		20	17	11–6	366	599	61.1	4,645	7.8	36	14	140.7	124	266	2.1	6
