= Jason Bachtel =

American football coach (born c. 1980)

Current position
- Title: Head coach
- Team: Houston Christian
- Conference: Southland
- Record: 8–17

Biographical details
- Born: c. 1980 (age 45–46); Texas, U.S.
- Education: Howard Payne University (2003); Lamar University (2018)

Playing career
- 1999–2001: Howard Payne
- Position: Quarterback

Coaching career (HC unless noted)
- 2002: Howard Payne (RB)
- 2003–2007: Gatesville HS (TX) (assistant)
- 2007–2010: Galena Park HS (TX) (assistant)
- 2011–2016: Scurry-Rosser HS (TX)
- 2017: North Forney HS (TX) (OC/QB)
- 2018–2019: East Texas Baptist (OC)
- 2020: Argyle HS (TX) (OC)
- 2020–2022 (Note: Bachtel joined Howard Payne in January 2021 and coached the 2020–21 team that played in the spring due to COVID-19.): Howard Payne
- 2023: Houston Christian (OC/QB)
- 2024–present: Houston Christian

Head coaching record
- Overall: 24–26 (college); 31–33 (high school)

Jason Bachtel (born c. 1980) is an American college football coach. He is the head football coach for Houston Christian University, a position he has held since 2024. He was the head football coach for Scurry-Rosser High School from 2011 to 2016 and Howard Payne University from 2021 to 2022. He also coached for Galena Park High School, Gatesville High School, North Forney High School, East Texas Baptist, and Argyle High School. He played college football for Howard Payne as a quarterback.

== Personal life ==
Bachtel's brother, Kevin, was the head football coach for Howard Payne University as Jason was his predecessor.

== Head coaching record ==
=== College ===
Year	Team	Overall	Conference	Standing	Bowl/playoffs
Howard Payne Yellow Jackets (American Southwest Conference) (2020–2022)
2020–21	Howard Payne	2–3	2–2	3rd (West)	
2021	Howard Payne	7–3	6–3	T–3rd	
2022	Howard Payne	7–3	6–2	3rd	
Howard Payne:		16–9	14–7		
Houston Christian Huskies (Southland Conference) (2024–present)
2024	Houston Christian	5–7	3–4	T–5th	
2025	Houston Christian	2–10	1–7	9th	
2026	Houston Christian	4–3	3–1		
Houston Christian:		11–20	7–12		
Total:		27–29			

=== High school ===
Year	Team	Overall	Conference	Standing	Bowl/playoffs
Scurry-Rosser Wildcats () (2011–2016)
2011	Scurry-Rosser	3–7	1–4	5th	
2012	Scurry-Rosser	5–5	4–3	4th	
2013	Scurry-Rosser	12–1	7–0	1st	
2014	Scurry-Rosser	3–7	1–4	5th	
2015	Scurry-Rosser	7–4	3-2	3rd	
2016	Scurry-Rosser	1–9	1–7	8th	
Scurry-Rosser:		31–33	17–20		
Total:		31–33			
National championship Conference title Conference division title or championship game berth
