= 2026 Southeastern Louisiana Lions football team =

American college football season

2026 Southeastern Louisiana Lions football
- Conference: Southland Conference
- Record: 6–6 (4–5 SLC)
- Head coach: Frank Scelfo (9th season)
- Offensive coordinator: Matt Bergeron (1st season)
- Defensive coordinator: Bill D'Ottavio (5th season)
- Home stadium: Strawberry Stadium

2026 Southland Conference football standings
| | Conf. | | | Overall |
| Team | W | | L | W | | L |
|---|---|---|---|---|---|---|
| No. 4 Lamar | 7 | – | 1 | 9 | – | 2 |
| No. 5 Stephen F. Austin | 7 | – | 1 | 10 | – | 1 |
| No. 21 Incarnate Word | 6 | – | 2 | 7 | – | 4 |
| McNeese | 4 | – | 4 | 5 | – | 6 |
| Houston Christian | 4 | – | 4 | 5 | – | 6 |
| Nicholls | 3 | – | 5 | 4 | – | 7 |
| East Texas A&M | 3 | – | 5 | 3 | – | 8 |
| UT Rio Grande Valley | 3 | – | 5 | 5 | – | 6 |
| Southeastern Louisiana | 3 | – | 5 | 5 | – | 6 |
| Northwestern State | 0 | – | 8 | 0 | – | 11 |
As of November 20, 2026; Rankings from STATS Poll

The 2026 Southeastern Louisiana Lions football team represents Southeastern Louisiana University as a member of the Southland Conference during the 2026 NCAA Division I FCS football season. They are led by head coach Frank Scelfo, who is coaching in his ninth season with the program. The Lions play their home games at Strawberry Stadium in Hammond, Louisiana.

== Schedule ==
| Date | Time | Opponent | Rank | Site | TV | Result | Attendance |
|---|---|---|---|---|---|---|---|
| August 27 | 6:00 p.m. | Houston Christian | No. 19 | Strawberry Stadium; Hammond, LA | ESPN+ | L 28–34 | 4,199 |
| September 5 | 6:00 p.m. | at South Alabama* | | Hancock Whitney Stadium; Mobile, AL | ESPN+ | L 14–39 | 15,087 |
| September 12 | 6:00 p.m. | North Alabama* | | Strawberry Stadium; Hammond, LA | ESPN+ | W 30–25 | 4,054 |
| September 19 | 3:30 p.m. | at Louisiana–Monroe* | | FMOL Health/St. Francis Stadium; Monroe, LA | ESPN+ | W 38–35 | 13,211 |
| September 26 | 6:00 p.m. | at Northwestern State | | Harry Turpin Stadium; Natchitoches, LA (rivalry) | ESPN+ | W 52–21 | 1,792 |
| October 10 | 7:00 p.m. | at UT Rio Grande Valley | | Robert and Janet Vackar Stadium; Edinburg, TX | ESPN+ | L 3–13 | 12,287 |
| October 17 | 4:00 p.m. | No. 10 Lamar^{†} | | Strawberry Stadium; Hammond, LA | ESPN+ | W 34–31 | 6,673 |
| October 24 | 5:00 p.m. | at No. 2 Stephen F. Austin | No. 23 | Homer Bryce Stadium; Nacogdoches, TX | ESPN+ | L 24–45 | 12,034 |
| October 31 | 3:00 p.m. | at East Texas A&M | | Ernest Hawkins Field at Memorial Stadium; Commerce, TX | ESPN+ | L 7–10 | 1,731 |
| November 7 | 6:00 p.m. | Incarnate Word | | Strawberry Stadium; Hammond, LA | ESPN+ | L 16–35 | 4,671 |
| November 14 | 6:00 p.m. | McNeese | | Strawberry Stadium; Hammond, LA | ESPN+ | W 21–17 | 5,012 |
| November 19 | 6:00 p.m. | at Nicholls | | Manning Field at John L. Guidry Stadium; Thibodaux, LA (River Bell Classic) | ESPN+ | W 38–10 | 6,322 |
*Non-conference game; ^{†}Homecoming; Rankings from STATS Poll released prior to the game; All times are in Central time

== Game summaries ==
=== Houston Christian ===
Houston Christian Huskies (0–0) at No. 19 Southeastern Louisiana Lions (0–0)

| Quarter | 1 | 2 | 3 | 4 | Total |
|---|---|---|---|---|---|
| Huskies | 0 | 17 | 14 | 3 | 34 |
| No. 19 Lions | 7 | 0 | 7 | 14 | 28 |

at Strawberry Stadium • Hammond, Louisiana

- Date: August 27
- Game time: 6:00 p.m. CDT
- Game weather: Sunny • Temperature: 83 °F (28 °C) • Wind: NW at 2 miles per hour (3.2 km/h)
- Game attendance: 4,199
- Referee: James Brookhart
- TV announcers (ESPN+): Logan Loving, Chase Gispert and Sophia Daniels

Game information

First quarter

- SELA – Calvin Smith Jr. 10-yard run (Drew Talley kick), 0:09. Lions 7–0. Drive: 12 plays, 73 yards, 6:03.

Second quarter

- HCU – Lukasz Smolen 30-yard field goal, 10:43. Lions 7–3. Drive: 5 plays, 22 yards, 2:15.
- HCU – Champ Dozier 4-yard run (Lukasz Smolen kick), 4:42. Huskies 10–7. Drive: 6 plays, 69 yards, 2:31.
- HCU – Keith Wheeler 12-yard pass from Cutter Stewart (Lukasz Smolen kick), 0:02. Huskies 17–7. Drive: 7 plays, 56 yards, 2:05.

Third quarter

- HCU – Jaylen Middleton 1-yard run (Lukasz Smolen kick), 8:24. Huskies 24–7. Drive: 15 plays, 70 yards, 6:31.
- SELA – Kyle Lowe 55-yard run (Drew Talley kick), 6:41. Huskies 24–14. Drive: 5 plays, 69 yards, 1:35.
- HCU – Jamaal Hall II 66-yard pass from Cutter Stewart (Lukasz Smolen kick), 1:55. Huskies 31–14. Drive: 1 play, 66 yards, 0:11.

Fourth quarter

- HCU – Lukasz Smolen 32-yard field goal, 14:20. Huskies 34–14. Drive: 7 plays, 26 yards, 1:51.
- SELA – Lawson Dixon 2-yard pass from Kyle Lowe (Drew Talley kick), 8:35. Huskies 34–21. Drive: 14 plays, 54 yards, 5:40.
- SELA – Lawson Dixon 18-yard pass from Kyle Lowe (Drew Talley kick), 3:29. Huskies 34–28. Drive: 7 plays, 51 yards, 1:17.

| Statistics | HCU | SELA |
|---|---|---|
| First downs | 17 | 23 |
| Total yards | 60–361 | 78–398 |
| Rushing yards | 41–161 | 51–248 |
| Passing yards | 200 | 150 |
| Passing: comp–att–int | 11–19–1 | 17–27–1 |
| Turnovers | 1 | 3 |
| Time of possession | 24:28 | 35:32 |

| Team | Category | Player | Statistics |
|---|---|---|---|
| Houston Christian | Passing | Cutter Stewart | 10/18, 173 yards, 2 TD, INT |
| Houston Christian | Rushing | Cutter Stewart | 15 carries, 96 yards |
| Houston Christian | Receiving | Jamaal Hall II | 2 receptions, 71 yards, TD |
| Southeastern Louisiana | Passing | Kyle Lowe | 17/27, 150 yards, 2 TD, INT |
| Southeastern Louisiana | Rushing | Kyree Paul | 8 carries, 70 yards |
| Southeastern Louisiana | Receiving | Lawson Dixon | 4 receptions, 46 yards, 2 TD |

=== at South Alabama (FBS) ===
Southeastern Louisiana Lions (0–1) at South Alabama Jaguars (FBS) (0–0) – Game summary

| Quarter | 1 | 2 | 3 | 4 | Total |
|---|---|---|---|---|---|
| Lions | 7 | 0 | 7 | 0 | 14 |
| Jaguars (FBS) | 19 | 3 | 10 | 7 | 39 |

at Hancock Whitney Stadium • Mobile, Alabama

- Date: September 5
- Game time: 6:00 p.m. CDT
- Game weather: Sunny
- Game attendance: 15,087
- Referee: Jeff Pruitt
- TV announcers (ESPN+): Pat Greenwood (play-by-play) and Brian Genard (analyst)

Game information

First quarter

- (13:19) USA – Brendan Jenkins 26-yard pass from Bishop Davenport, Davis Little kick (Drive: 5 plays, 55 yards, 1:33; South Alabama 7–0)
- (6:07) USA – Davis Little 35-yard field goal (Drive: 11 plays, 45 yards, 5:24; South Alabama 10–0)
- (4:59) USA – 0-yard safety (South Alabama 12–0)
- (2:38) USA – Trae'von Dunbar 1-yard run, Davis Little kick (Drive: 8 plays, 50 yards, 2:21; South Alabama 19–0)
- (1:16) SELA – Lonnie Shinn Jr. 12-yard pass from Kyle Lowe, Drew Talley kick (Drive: 4 plays, 76 yards, 1:16; South Alabama 19–7)

Second quarter

- (0:00) USA – Davis Little 30-yard field goal (Drive: 9 plays, 32 yards, 1:48; South Alabama 22–7)

Third quarter

- (12:46) SELA – Lonnie Shinn Jr. 7-yard pass from Kyle Lowe, Drew Talley kick (Drive: 4 plays, 65 yards, 2:14; South Alabama 22–14)
- (7:04) USA – Davis Little 26-yard field goal (Drive: 11 plays, 45 yards, 5:33; South Alabama 25–14)
- (4:06) USA – Bishop Davenport 2-yard run, Davis Little kick (Drive: 4 plays, 9 yards, 1:39; South Alabama 32–14)

Fourth quarter

- (9:02) USA – PJ Martin 3-yard run, Davis Little kick (Drive: 15 plays, 47 yards, 8:15; South Alabama 32–14)

| Statistics | SELA | USA |
|---|---|---|
| First downs | 11 | 27 |
| Plays–yards | 37–231 | 86–395 |
| Rushes–yards | 17–45 | 59–241 |
| Passing yards | 186 | 154 |
| Passing: comp–att–int | 12–20–2 | 18–27–0 |
| Turnovers | 2 | 0 |
| Time of possession | 19:51 | 40:09 |

| Team | Category | Player | Statistics |
|---|---|---|---|
| Southeastern Louisiana | Passing | Kyle Lowe | 12/20, 186 yards, 2 TD, 2 INT |
| Southeastern Louisiana | Rushing | Calvin Smith Jr. | 8 carries, 38 yards |
| Southeastern Louisiana | Receiving | Chad Elzy | 2 receptions, 70 yards |
| South Alabama | Passing | Bishop Davenport | 18/27, 154 yards, TD |
| South Alabama | Rushing | PJ Martin | 18 carries, 69 yards, TD |
| South Alabama | Receiving | Brendan Jenkins | 5 receptions, 78 yards, TD |

=== North Alabama ===
North Alabama Lions (1–1) at Southeastern Louisiana Lions (0–2) – Game summary

| Quarter | 1 | 2 | 3 | 4 | Total |
|---|---|---|---|---|---|
| North Alabama | 0 | 0 | 0 | 0 | 0 |
| Southeastern Louisiana | 0 | 0 | 0 | 0 | 0 |

at Strawberry Stadium • Hammond, Louisiana

- Date: September 12
- Game time: 6:00 p.m. CDT
- TV: ESPN+

Game information

First quarter
Second quarter
Third quarter
Fourth quarter

| Statistics | UNA | SELA |
|---|---|---|
| First downs | | |
| Total yards | | |
| Rushing yards | | |
| Passing yards | | |
| Turnovers | | |
| Time of possession | | |

| Team | Category | Player | Statistics |
|---|---|---|---|
| North Alabama | Passing | | |
| North Alabama | Rushing | | |
| North Alabama | Receiving | | |
| Southeastern Louisiana | Passing | | |
| Southeastern Louisiana | Rushing | | |
| Southeastern Louisiana | Receiving | | |

=== at Louisiana–Monroe (FBS) ===
Southeastern Louisiana Lions (1–2) at Louisiana–Monroe Warhawks (FBS) (0–2) – Game summary

| Quarter | 1 | 2 | 3 | 4 | Total |
|---|---|---|---|---|---|
| Lions | 7 | 17 | 7 | 7 | 38 |
| Warhawks (FBS) | 0 | 13 | 7 | 15 | 35 |

at FMOL Health/St. Francis Stadium • Monroe, Louisiana

- Date: September 19
- Game time: 3:30 p.m. CDT
- Game weather: Sunny • Temperature: 97 °F (36 °C) • Wind: SE 8 mph
- Referee: Brandon Kirkland
- TV announcers (ESPN+): Sean Fox (play-by-play) and Desmund Lighten (analyst)

Game information

First quarter

- SELA – Lonnie Shinn 31-yard pass from Kyle Lowe (Drew Talley kick), 3:10. Lions 7-0. Drive: 12 plays, 80 yards, 5:17.

Second quarter

- ULM – Parker Fulghum 17-yard pass from Austin Carlisle (Abram Murray PAT failed), 14:00. Lions 7–6. Drive: 6 plays, 29 yards, 2:36.
- SELA – Tristan Goodly 3-yard pass from Kyle Lowe (Drew Talley kick), 8:38. Lions 14–6. Drive: 5 plays, 34 yards, 2:34.
- SELA – Kyree Paul 17-yard run (Drew Talley kick), 4:10. Lions 21–6. Drive: 5 plays, 53 yards, 2:37.
- ULM – Nic Trujillo 8-yard pass from Austin Carlisle (Abram Murray kick), 0:32. Lions 21–13. Drive: 10 plays, 78 yards, 3:31.
- SELA – Drew Talley 43-yard field goal, 0:00. Lions 24–13. Drive: 6 plays, 49 yards, 0:32.

Third quarter

- SELA – Dhkai Joseph 78-yard punt return (Drew Talley kick), 5:33. Lions 31–13. Drive: 3 plays, -5 yards, 2:03.
- ULM – Derrick Jameson 32-yard run (Abram Murray kick), 2:00. Lions 31–20. Drive: 8 plays, 75 yards, 3:34.

Fourth quarter

- SELA – Richard McKneely 11-yard interception return (Drew Talley kick), 14:44. Lions 38–20. Drive: 1 play, 0 yards, 0:08.
- ULM – Derrick Jameson 2-yard run (Derrick Jameson two-point conversion run), 10:54. Lions 38–28. Drive: 9 plays, 75 yards, 3:50.
- SELA – Nic Trujillo 47-yard pass from Aidan Armenta (Abram Murray kick), 3:03. Lions 38–35. Drive: 8 plays, 97 yards, 2:48.

| Statistics | SELA | ULM |
|---|---|---|
| First downs | 15 | 27 |
| Plays–yards | 55-279 | 80-511 |
| Rushes–yards | 30-124 | 35-180 |
| Passing yards | 155 | 331 |
| Passing: comp–att–int | 18-25-0 | 29-45-2 |
| Time of possession | 26:31 | 33:29 |

| Team | Category | Player | Statistics |
|---|---|---|---|
| Southeastern Louisiana | Passing | Kyle Lowe | 18/25, 155 yards, 2 TDs |
| Southeastern Louisiana | Rushing | Chad Elzy Jr. | 8 carries, 58 yards |
| Southeastern Louisiana | Receiving | Lonnie Shinn | 4 receptions, 49 yards, TD |
| Louisiana–Monroe | Passing | Austin Carlisle | 19/24, 183 yards, 2 TDs, 2 INTs |
| Louisiana–Monroe | Rushing | Derrick Jameson | 9 carries, 85 yards, 2 TDs |
| Louisiana–Monroe | Receiving | Parker Fulghum | 5 receptions, 88 yards, TD |

=== at Northwestern State (rivalry) ===
Southeastern Louisiana Lions (2–2) at Northwestern State Demons (0–4) – Game summary

| Quarter | 1 | 2 | 3 | 4 | Total |
|---|---|---|---|---|---|
| Lions | 0 | 0 | 0 | 0 | 0 |
| Demons | 0 | 0 | 0 | 0 | 0 |

at Harry Turpin Stadium • Natchitoches, Louisiana

- Date: September 26
- Game time: 6:00 p.m. CDT
- TV: ESPN+

Game information

First quarter
Second quarter
Third quarter
Fourth quarter

| Statistics | SELA | NWST |
|---|---|---|
| First downs | | |
| Plays–yards | | |
| Rushes–yards | | |
| Passing yards | | |
| Passing: comp–att–int | | |
| Time of possession | | |

| Team | Category | Player | Statistics |
|---|---|---|---|
| Southeastern Louisiana | Passing | | |
| Southeastern Louisiana | Rushing | | |
| Southeastern Louisiana | Receiving | | |
| Northwestern State | Passing | | |
| Northwestern State | Rushing | | |
| Northwestern State | Receiving | | |

=== at UT Rio Grande Valley ===
Southeastern Louisiana Lions (3–2) at UT Rio Grande Valley Vaqueros (2–3)

| Quarter | 1 | 2 | 3 | 4 | Total |
|---|---|---|---|---|---|
| Lions | 0 | 0 | 0 | 0 | 0 |
| Vaqueros | 0 | 0 | 0 | 0 | 0 |

at Harry Turpin Stadium • Edinburg, Texas

- Date: October 10
- Game time: 7:00 p.m. CDT
- TV: ESPN+

Game information

First quarter
Second quarter
Third quarter
Fourth quarter

| Statistics | SELA | RGV |
|---|---|---|
| First downs | | |
| Plays–yards | | |
| Rushes–yards | | |
| Passing yards | | |
| Passing: comp–att–int | | |
| Time of possession | | |

| Team | Category | Player | Statistics |
|---|---|---|---|
| Southeastern Louisiana | Passing | | |
| Southeastern Louisiana | Rushing | | |
| Southeastern Louisiana | Receiving | | |
| UT Rio Grande Valley | Passing | | |
| UT Rio Grande Valley | Rushing | | |
| UT Rio Grande Valley | Receiving | | |

=== No. 10 Lamar ===
No. 10 Lamar Cardinals (5–1) at Southeastern Louisiana Lions (3–3)

| Quarter | 1 | 2 | 3 | 4 | Total |
|---|---|---|---|---|---|
| No. 10 Cardinals | 0 | 0 | 0 | 0 | 0 |
| Lions | 0 | 0 | 0 | 0 | 0 |

at Strawberry Stadium • Hammond, Louisiana

- Date: October 17
- Game time: TBA p.m. CDT
- TV: ESPN+

Game information

First quarter
Second quarter
Third quarter
Fourth quarter

| Statistics | LAM | SELA |
|---|---|---|
| First downs | | |
| Total yards | | |
| Rushing yards | | |
| Passing yards | | |
| Turnovers | | |
| Time of possession | | |

| Team | Category | Player | Statistics |
|---|---|---|---|
| Lamar | Passing | | |
| Lamar | Rushing | | |
| Lamar | Receiving | | |
| Southeastern Louisiana | Passing | | |
| Southeastern Louisiana | Rushing | | |
| Southeastern Louisiana | Receiving | | |

=== at No. 2 Stephen F. Austin ===
No. 23 Southeastern Louisiana Lions (4–3) at No. 2 Stephen F. Austin Lumberjacks (7–0)

| Quarter | 1 | 2 | 3 | 4 | Total |
|---|---|---|---|---|---|
| No. 23 Lions | 0 | 0 | 0 | 0 | 0 |
| No. 2 Lumberjacks | 0 | 0 | 0 | 0 | 0 |

at Homer Bryce Stadium • Nacogdoches, Texas

- Date: October 24
- Game time: 5:00 p.m. CDT
- TV: ESPN+

Game information

First quarter
Second quarter
Third quarter
Fourth quarter

| Statistics | SELA | SFA |
|---|---|---|
| First downs | | |
| Plays–yards | | |
| Rushes–yards | | |
| Passing yards | | |
| Passing: comp–att–int | | |
| Time of possession | | |

| Team | Category | Player | Statistics |
|---|---|---|---|
| Southeastern Louisiana | Passing | | |
| Southeastern Louisiana | Rushing | | |
| Southeastern Louisiana | Receiving | | |
| Stephen F. Austin | Passing | | |
| Stephen F. Austin | Rushing | | |
| Stephen F. Austin | Receiving | | |

=== at East Texas A&M ===
Southeastern Louisiana Lions (4–4) at East Texas A&M Lions (2–6)

| Quarter | 1 | 2 | 3 | 4 | Total |
|---|---|---|---|---|---|
| Southeastern Louisiana | 0 | 0 | 0 | 0 | 0 |
| East Texas A&M | 0 | 0 | 0 | 0 | 0 |

at Ernest Hawkins Field at Memorial Stadium • Commerce, Texas

- Date: October 31
- Game time: 3:00 p.m. CDT
- TV: ESPN+

Game information

First quarter
Second quarter
Third quarter
Fourth quarter

| Statistics | SELA | ETAM |
|---|---|---|
| First downs | | |
| Plays–yards | | |
| Rushes–yards | | |
| Passing yards | | |
| Passing: comp–att–int | | |
| Time of possession | | |

| Team | Category | Player | Statistics |
|---|---|---|---|
| Southeastern Louisiana | Passing | | |
| Southeastern Louisiana | Rushing | | |
| Southeastern Louisiana | Receiving | | |
| East Texas A&M | Passing | | |
| East Texas A&M | Rushing | | |
| East Texas A&M | Receiving | | |

=== Incarnate Word ===
Incarnate Word Cardinals (5–4) at Southeastern Louisiana Lions (4–5)

| Quarter | 1 | 2 | 3 | 4 | Total |
|---|---|---|---|---|---|
| Cardinals | 14 | 7 | 0 | 14 | 35 |
| Lions | 3 | 0 | 13 | 0 | 16 |

at Strawberry Stadium • Hammond, Louisiana

- Date: November 7
- Game time: 6:00 p.m. CDT
- Game weather: Sunny • Temperature: 65 °F (18 °C) • Wind: N at 7 miles per hour (11 km/h)
- Game attendance: 4,671
- Referee: Austin Mezzacasa
- TV announcers (ESPN+): David Keller (play-by-play) & Logan Loving (analyst)

Game information

First quarter

- UIW – 11:37 Emmett Brown 5 yard run, Nick Rigas kick
  UIW 7–0 Drive: 10 plays, 65 yards, 3:18
- SLU – 6:17 Drew Talley 24 yard field goal
  UIW 7–3 Drive: 12 plays, 63 yards, 5:20
- UIW – 2:16 Lontrell Turner 1 yard run, Nick Rigas kick
  UIW 14–3 Drive: 9 plays, 83 yards, 3:57

Second quarter

- UIW – 10:39 Roy Alexander 23 yard pass from Emmett Brown, Nick Rigas kick
  UIW 21–3 Drive: 10 plays, 84 yards, 4:07

Third quarter

- SLU – 14:46 Blake Smith 97 yard kickoff return, Drew Talley kick
  UIW 21–10
- SLU – 9:16 Drew Talley 51 yard field goal
  UIW 21–13 Drive: 6 plays, 51 yards, 3:18
- SLU – 0:00 Drew Talley 29 yard field goal
  UIW 21–16 Drive: 12 plays, 51 yards, 5:55

Fourth quarter

- UIW – 13:17 Lontrell Turner 9 yard run, Nick Rigas kick
  UIW 28–16 Drive: 6 plays, 75 yards, 1:43
- UIW – 7:13 Jayden Hibbler 4 yard run, Nick Rigas kick
  UIW 35–16 Drive: 4 plays, 70 yards, 2:05

| Statistics | UIW | SELA |
|---|---|---|
| First downs | 29 | 16 |
| Plays–yards | 72–546 | 59–255 |
| Rushes–yards | 47–252 | 33–107 |
| Passing yards | 294 | 148 |
| Passing: comp–att–int | 18–25–1 | 13–26–1 |
| Turnovers | 1 | 1 |
| Time of possession | 31:28 | 28:32 |

| Team | Category | Player | Statistics |
|---|---|---|---|
| Incarnate Word | Passing | Emmett Brown | 18/25, 294 yards, TD, INT |
| Incarnate Word | Rushing | Jayden Hibbler | 18 carries, 134 yards, TD |
| Incarnate Word | Receiving | Roy Alexander | 6 receptions, 172 yards, TD |
| Southeastern Louisiana | Passing | Kyle Lowe | 10/21, 143 yards |
| Southeastern Louisiana | Rushing | Kyle Lowe | 11 carries, 58 yards |
| Southeastern Louisiana | Receiving | Dkhai Joseph | 5 receptions, 82 yards |

=== McNeese ===
McNeese Cowboys (5–5) at Southeastern Louisiana Lions (4–6)

| Quarter | 1 | 2 | 3 | 4 | Total |
|---|---|---|---|---|---|
| Cowboys | 0 | 0 | 0 | 0 | 0 |
| Lions | 0 | 0 | 0 | 0 | 0 |

at Strawberry Stadium • Hammond, Louisiana

- Date: November 14
- Game time: TBA p.m. CDT
- TV: ESPN+

Game information

First quarter
Second quarter
Third quarter
Fourth quarter

| Statistics | MCN | SELA |
|---|---|---|
| First downs | | |
| Total yards | | |
| Rushing yards | | |
| Passing yards | | |
| Turnovers | | |
| Time of possession | | |

| Team | Category | Player | Statistics |
|---|---|---|---|
| McNeese | Passing | | |
| McNeese | Rushing | | |
| McNeese | Receiving | | |
| Southeastern Louisiana | Passing | | |
| Southeastern Louisiana | Rushing | | |
| Southeastern Louisiana | Receiving | | |

=== at Nicholls (River Bell Classic) ===
Southeastern Louisiana Lions (5–6) at Nicholls Colonels (4–7)

| Quarter | 1 | 2 | 3 | 4 | Total |
|---|---|---|---|---|---|
| Lions | 0 | 0 | 0 | 0 | 0 |
| Colonels | 0 | 0 | 0 | 0 | 0 |

at John L. Guidry Stadium • Thibodaux, Louisiana

- Date: November 19
- Game time: 6:00 p.m. CDT
- TV: ESPN+

Game information

First quarter
Second quarter
Third quarter
Fourth quarter

| Statistics | SELA | NICH |
|---|---|---|
| First downs | | |
| Plays–yards | | |
| Rushes–yards | | |
| Passing yards | | |
| Passing: comp–att–int | | |
| Time of possession | | |

| Team | Category | Player | Statistics |
|---|---|---|---|
| Southeastern Louisiana | Passing | | |
| Southeastern Louisiana | Rushing | | |
| Southeastern Louisiana | Receiving | | |
| Nicholls | Passing | | |
| Nicholls | Rushing | | |
| Nicholls | Receiving | | |

== Personnel ==
=== Coaching staff ===
| Name | Position |
|---|---|
| Frank Scelfo | Head coach |
| Bill D'Ottavio | Defensive coordinator |
| Matt Bergeron | Offensive coordinator / quarterbacks coach |
| Dustin Landry | Associate head coach / pass game coordinator / secondary coach |
| Tom Rinaldi | Assistant head coach / defensive line coach |
| Alvin Slaughter | Wide receivers coach |
| Trey Willie | Running backs coach |
| Antonio Baker | Nickelbacks coach |
| Trey Nunez | Linebackers coach / recruiting coordinator |
| Ryan Allgood | Offensive line coach / run game coordinator |
| Ed Groth | Special teams coordinator |
| David Mertens | Director of player personnel / tight ends coach |

=== Roster ===
2026 Southeastern Louisiana Lions Football
| Quarterbacks: 6 – Kyle Lowe – (redshirt) junior (5'10, 195); 8 – Cole Welliver – sophomore (6'7, 225); 10 – Isaac Mooring III – junior (6'4, 205); 13 – Conner Nelson – (redshirt) freshman (6'2, 215); 14 – Casey Avrard – (redshirt) junior (6'2, 215); Running backs: 3 – Deantre Jackson – senior (5'8, 175); 9 – Calvin Smith Jr. – sophomore (5'11, 225); 24 – Kyree Paul – sophomore (5'9, 175); 31 – Landon Garcia – freshman (5'8, 180); 33 – Chad Elzy Jr. – sophomore (5'10, 200); 33 – Cayden Jones – sophomore (5'10, 180); 39 – Eugene Foulcard – (redshirt) sophomore (5'8, 165); Wide receivers: 2 – Landon Ibieta – junior (5'11, 195); 17 – Kentrell Prejean – junior (5'8, 160); 80 – AD Washington – sophomore (5'10, 160); 81 – Dkhai Joseph – junior (5'10, 160); 82 – Jarien Brown – junior (5'11, 170); 82 – Tristan Goodly – (redshirt) junior (6'0, 180); 83 – Khai Prean – junior (6'0, 200); 87 – Aamir Ellis – (redshirt) freshman (6'0, 170) | Tight ends: 42 – Beau Perez – (redshirt) sophomore (6'5, 250); 85 – Adyn Wilkinson – junior (6'4, 250); 88 – Lonnie Shinn – sophomore (6'5, 235); Fullbacks: 30 – Zane Hooper – junior (6'0, 270); Offensive linemen: 54 – Amiree Alexander – (redshirt) sophomore (6'2, 290); 56 – Noah Trepagnier – sophomore (6'1, 250); 60 – Ilias Rida – (redshirt) junior (6'7, 290); 63 – Corin Boudreaux – (redshirt) junior (6'1, 300); 65 – Riley Whitten – (redshirt) junior (6'2, 300); 66 – Carson Dillashaw – (redshirt) junior (6'6, 295); 73 – Isaiah Hayes – (redshirt) sophomore (6'4, 310); 76 – Damien Reed – (redshirt) sophomore (6'2, 305); 78 – Logan Potter – (redshirt) senior (6'5, 330) | Defensive linemen: 39 – James Harris – (redshirt) sophomore (6'2, 255); 40 – Evan Aubrey – (redshirt) sophomore (6'4, 250); 45 – Khalid Moore – senior (6'2, 230); 48 – Max Elkman – senior (6'6, 255); 58 – Camden Womack – (redshirt) sophomore (6'5, 240); 90 – Peyton Anderson – senior (6'3, 285); 91 – Gabe Whittington – senior (6'0, 260); 92 – Etison Pholo – (redshirt) freshman (6'2, 275); 93 – Gabriel Harvey – (redshirt) freshman (6'3, 245); 94 – Nathan Fegan – (redshirt) freshman (6'3, 270); 95 – Kadan Lewis – junior (6'1, 270); 97 – Louis Gendron – (redshirt) sophomore (6'3, 275); 99 – Otto Brewer III – (redshirt) sophomore (6'3, 245); Linebackers: 7 – Jake Dalmado – senior (6'0, 215); 15 – Jordan Okoye – senior (6'1, 215); 22 – Carter Hanberry – junior (6'0, 215); 34 – Trace Carter – junior (6'1, 220); 38 – Tanner Spears – (redshirt) freshman (6'0, 200); 43 – Donte Flowers – freshman (6'0, 225); 43 – Jirrea Johnson Jr. – (redshirt) junior (5'11, 220); 44 – Gabe Copeland – sophomore (6'2, 220); 49 – Devaki Williams – senior (6'1, 230); 50 – Stiles Guidry – junior (6'1, 230); 59 – Jackson Casanova – (redshirt) freshman (6'1, 220) | Defensive backs: 1 – Zay Franks – senior (6'3, 200); 11 – CJ Fraser – senior (6'0, 185); 16 – Jylan Wiltz – (redshirt) sophomore (5'8, 160); 18 – Carlando Crump – senior (6'1, 185); 20 – Mike Mitchell – (redshirt) junior (5'11, 175); 23 – Zack Vicknair – (redshirt) senior (6'0, 195); 27 – Cayden Randall – freshman (6'0, 190); 31 – Lennis Finister Jr. – sophomore (6'0, 170); 32 – Carter Byrd – (redshirt) freshman (6'1, 190); 32 – Jacob Jeffrey – freshman (5'11, 190); 34 – Jacob Black – sophomore (6'1, 170); 36 – Richard McKneely – (redshirt) junior (6'0, 180); 36 – Preston Sentino – sophomore (5'11, 185); 46 – Jared Campbell – sophomore (6'1, 170); Placekickers: 26 – Trey Furey – sophomore (6'0, 175); 29 – Drew Talley – (redshirt) freshman (5'10, 165); Punters: 46 – Jack Hunter – (redshirt) junior (6'3, 215); 52 – Aiden Parker – (redshirt) freshman (6'1, 170); Long snapper: 28 – Andre Callais Jr. – (redshirt) junior (5'9, 210) |
Source and player details, 2026 Southeastern Louisiana Lions (6/3/2026):

== Rankings ==
Ranking movements Legend: ██ Increase in ranking ██ Decrease in ranking — = Not ranked RV = Received votes
| | Week | | | | | | | | | | | | | | |
| Poll | Pre | 1 | 2 | 3 | 4 | 5 | 6 | 7 | 8 | 9 | 10 | 11 | 12 | 13 | Final |
|---|---|---|---|---|---|---|---|---|---|---|---|---|---|---|---|
| STATS FCS | 19 | RV | — | — | RV | RV | RV | RV | 23 | RV | | | | | |
| Coaches | 20 | RV | — | — | RV | RV | 25 | RV | 24 | RV | | | | | |
