= Houston Christian Huskies football =

American college football team

Houston Christian Huskies
2026 Houston Christian Huskies football team
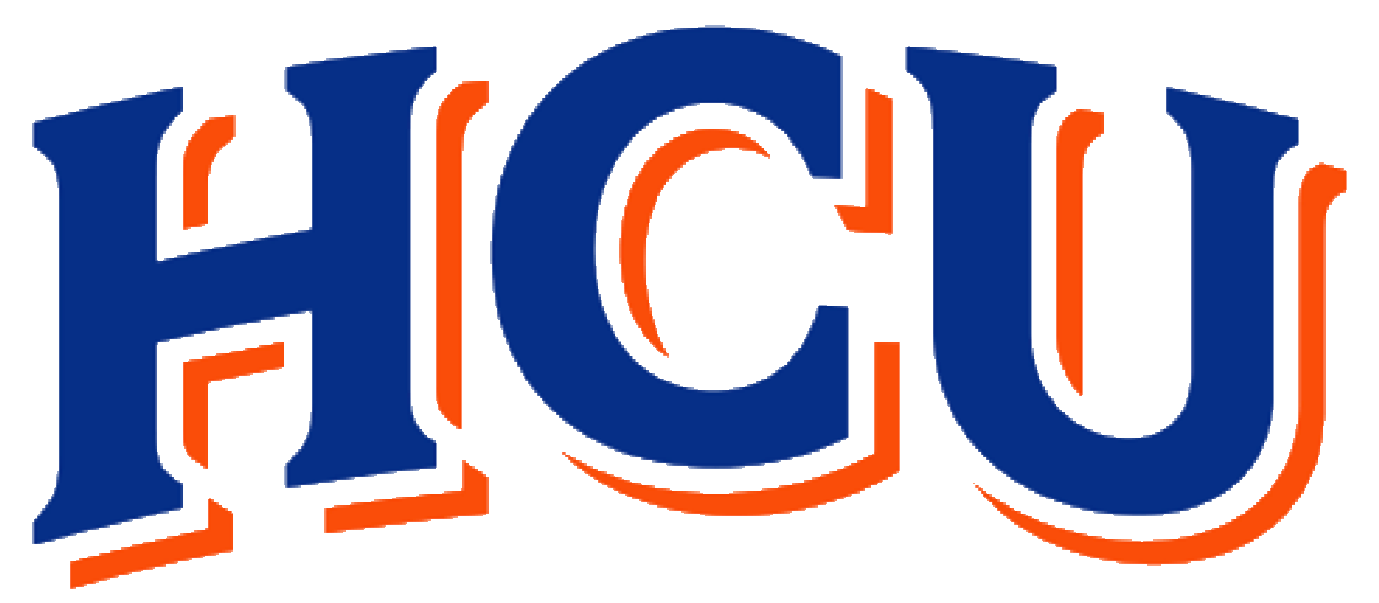
- First season: 2013; 13 years ago
- Athletic director: Steve Moniaci
- Head coach: Jason Bachtel; 3rd season, 7–17 (.292)
- Location: Houston, Texas
- Stadium: Husky Stadium (capacity: 5,000)
- Field: Dunham Field
- NCAA division: Division I FCS
- Conference: Southland
- Colors: Royal blue and orange
- All-time record: 33–101 (.246)
- Fight song: "Mighty Huskies"
- Marching band: Husky Marching Band
- Outfitter: Under Armour
- Website: HCUHuskies.com

The Houston Christian Huskies football team, formerly known as the Houston Baptist Huskies until the 2021 season, is the intercollegiate American football team for Houston Christian University located in Houston, Texas, United States. The team currently competes in the NCAA Division I Football Championship Subdivision (FCS) as a full member of the Southland Conference.

== History ==
HCU’s first football team was fielded in 2013 for a seven game developmental season. The Huskies finished 2013 with a 3–4 record. Since the 2013 games were played during a developmental season, records and statistics are considered unofficial. The team played most of its 2013 home games at Strake Jesuit’s Crusader Stadium in Houston, Texas, and one home game at BBVA Compass Stadium.

September 6, 2014 marked two firsts: The Huskies played their first game as an FCS team, and the game against McMurry University also marked the first game played in Husky Stadium, the new on-campus stadium.

On September 21, 2019, HCU junior wide receiver Ben Ratzlaff hit junior half-back Coleman Robinson for a two-point conversion after the Huskies scored with 1:14 remaining to rally past South Dakota, 53–52, in a non-conference matchup in the DakotaDome. This marked the biggest win in school history pushing HCU to be nationally ranked for the first time in school history sitting tied at No. 25 in the coaches' poll.

December 13, 2022 marked a new era began on campus. HCU named Braxton Harris as the second head football coach in the school's history, as announced by president Robert Sloan and director of athletics Steve Moniaci at a campus press conference. The Huskies were previously coached by Vic Shealy.

== Head coaches ==
Coach	Tenure	Overall Record	Conference Record
Vic Shealy	2013–2022	21–79 (.210)	7–57 (.109)
Braxton Harris	2023	5–5 (.500)	4–3 (.571)
Jason Bachtel	2024–present	7–17 (.292)	4–11 (.267)
Total		33–101 (.246)	

== Year-by-year results ==
Year	NCAA Division	Conference	Overall					Conference						Coach
Year	NCAA Division	Conference	Games	Win	Loss	Tie	Pct.	Games	Win	Loss	Tie	Pct.	Standing	Coach
2013^{1}	NCAA unclassified	N/A	7	3	4	0	.429	0	0	0	0	–	N/A	Vic Shealy
2014^{2}	FCS	Southland	11	2	9	0	.182	8	1	7	0	.125	10th	Vic Shealy
2015	FCS	Southland	11	2	9	0	.182	8	0	8	0	.000	11th	Vic Shealy
2016	FCS	Southland	11	4	7	0	.364	8	3	5	0	.375	7th	Vic Shealy
2017	FCS	Southland	11	1	10	0	.091	9	0	9	0	.000	11th	Vic Shealy
2018	FCS	Southland	11	1	10	0	.091	9	0	9	0	.000	11th	Vic Shealy
2019	FCS	Southland	12	5	7	0	.417	8	2	6	0	.250	10th	Vic Shealy
2020^{3}	FCS	Southland	4	1	3	0	.250	0	0	0	0	–	N/A	Vic Shealy
2021	FCS	Southland	11	0	11	0	.000	8	0	8	0	.000	6th	Vic Shealy
2022	FCS	Southland	11	2	9	0	.182	6	1	5	0	.167	7th	Vic Shealy
2023^{4}	FCS	Southland	10	5	5	0	.500	7	4	3	0	.571	4th	Braxton Harris
2024	FCS	Southland	12	5	7	0	.417	7	3	4	0	.429	T–5th	Jason Bachtel
2025	FCS	Southland	12	2	10	0	.167	8	1	7	0	.125	9th	Jason Bachtel
	Totals		122	33	101	0	.254	78	15	71	0	.174		

^{1} The 2013 season was a developmental season. Records and statistics are unofficial.

^{2} The 2014 season is the official inaugural season.

^{3} The 2020 Southland Conference season was cut short due to the COVID-19 pandemic and only 4 non-conference games were played.

^{4} Northwestern State cancelled the remainder of their 2023 season on October 26 and forfeited the rest of their games, including the scheduled game for both schools on November 4. The Huskies were awarded a conference win, but not an overall win, to their record.

== All-time record vs. Southland teams ==
Official record against all current Southland opponents:

Opponent	Won	Lost	Percentage	Streak	First	Last
Northwestern State	4	5	.444	Won 3	2017	2025
Lamar	3	5	.375	Loss 1	2014	2023
East Texas A&M	2	3	.400	Won 1	2022	2026
McNeese	2	6	.250	Loss 1	2017	2025
Nicholls	3	10	.231	Won 1	2014	2026
Stephen F. Austin	1	6	.143	Loss 4	2014	2025
Southeastern Louisiana	2	9	.182	Won 1	2014	2026
Incarnate Word	0	11	.000	Loss 11	2014	2026
UT Rio Grande Valley	0	1	.000	Loss 1	2025	2025
Totals	17	56	.233			

== Notable former players ==
- Caleb Johnson (2016–2020) – NFL linebacker
- Bailey Zappe (2017–2020) – NFL quarterback
- Jerreth Sterns (2018–2020) – CFL wide receiver
- Jalyx Hunt (2022–2023) – NFL linebacker

== Future non-conference opponents ==
Announced non-conference opponents as of October 21, 2026.

2027	2028	2029	2030
at UTEP	Central Arkansas	at Prairie View A&M	at Idaho State
at Northern Colorado	at James Madison	at Rice	Prairie View A&M
at Colorado State		at Central Arkansas	

== See also ==
- List of NCAA Division I FCS football programs
