= 2026 Stephen F. Austin Lumberjacks football team =

American college football season

2026 Stephen F. Austin Lumberjacks football

Southland co-champion
- Conference: Southland Conference

Ranking
- STATS: No. 5
- FCS Coaches: No. 4
- Record: 11–1 (8–1 SLC)
- Head coach: Colby Carthel (8th season)
- Offensive coordinator: Jared May (1st season)
- Defensive coordinator: Caid Faske (1st season)
- Home stadium: Homer Bryce Stadium

2026 Southland Conference football standings
	Conf.			Overall
Team	W		L	W		L
No. 4 Lamar +^	8	–	1	10	–	2
No. 5 Stephen F. Austin +	8	–	1	11	–	1
No. 21 Incarnate Word	7	–	2	8	–	4
UT Rio Grande Valley	4	–	5	6	–	6
Southeastern Louisiana	4	–	5	6	–	6
Houston Christian	4	–	5	5	–	7
McNeese	4	–	5	5	–	7
Nicholls	3	–	6	4	–	8
East Texas A&M	3	–	6	3	–	9
Northwestern State	0	–	9	0	–	12
+ – Conference co-champions; ^ – FCS playoff participant; As of November 22, 2026; Rankings from STATS Poll

The 2026 Stephen F. Austin Lumberjacks football team represents Stephen F. Austin State University as a member of the Southland Conference (SLC) during the 2026 NCAA Division I FCS football season. The Lumberjacks are led by eighth-year head coach Colby Carthel and play their home games at Homer Bryce Stadium in Nacogdoches, Texas.

== Schedule ==
Date	Time	Opponent	Rank	Site	TV	Result	Attendance
August 29	6:00 p.m.	at McNeese	No. 13	Navarre Stadium; Lake Charles, LA	ESPN+	W 38–27	10,680
September 5	7:00 p.m.	East Texas A&M	No. 13	Homer Bryce Stadium; Nacogdoches, TX	ESPN+	W 44–7	6,772
September 12	7:00 p.m.	at No. 23 Abilene Christian*	No. 13	Wildcat Stadium; Abilene, TX	ESPN+	W 26–7	7,739
September 19	7:00 p.m.	at Prairie View A&M*	No. 12	Panther Stadium; Prairie View, TX	SWAC TV	W 31–10	6,794
September 26	5:00 p.m.	No. 15 (DII) Northeastern State*	No. 9	Homer Bryce Stadium; Nacogdoches, TX	ESPN+	W 63–14	10,043
October 3	5:00 p.m.	Incarnate Word	No. 7	Homer Bryce Stadium; Nacogdoches, TX	ESPN+	W 28–26	8,675
October 17	3:00 p.m.	at Nicholls	No. 3	Manning Field at John L. Guidry Stadium; Thibodaux, LA	ESPN+	W 56–0	5,022
October 24	5:00 p.m.	No. 23 Southeastern Louisiana	No. 2	Homer Bryce Stadium; Nacogdoches, TX	ESPN+	W 45–24	12,034
October 31	2:00 p.m.	Houston Christian	No. 2	Homer Bryce Stadium; Nacogdoches, TX	ESPN+	W 37–6	5,763
November 7	3:00 p.m.	at No. 13 Lamar	No. 2	Provost Umphrey Stadium; Beaumont, TX	ESPN+	L 28–45	11,126
November 14	5:00 p.m.	at UT Rio Grande Valley	No. 7т	Robert and Janet Vackar Stadium; Edinburg, TX	ESPN+	W 48–0	11,314
November 19	6:00 p.m.	Northwestern State	No. 5	Homer Bryce Stadium; Nacogdoches, TX (Chief Caddo)	ESPN+	W 66–0	5,673
*Non-conference game; Rankings from STATS Poll released prior to the game; All times are in Central time

== Game summaries ==
=== at McNeese ===
No. 13 Stephen F. Austin Lumberjacks (0–0) at McNeese Cowboys (0–0) – Game summary

Quarter	1	2	3	4	Total
No. 13 Lumberjacks	10	14	14	0	38
Cowboys	7	0	6	14	27

at Navarre Stadium • Lake Charles, Louisiana

- Date: August 29
- Game time: 6 p.m.
- Game weather: Sunny • Temperature: 90 °F (32 °C) • Wind: S 10 mph
- Game attendance: 10,680
- Referee: James Brookhart
- TV announcers (ESPN+): Chaston Tavarees (play-by-play), Cody Stroud (analyst) and Lexi Arabie (sideline)

Game information

First quarter

- MCN – Elisha Edwards 45-yard pass from Jake Strong (Deaglan Camron kick), 12:19. Cowboys 7–0. Drive: 5 plays, 75 yards, 2:41.
- SFA – Bugs Mortimer 37-yard pass from Gavin Rutherford (Carlos Alvarado kick), 11:05. Tied 7–7. Drive: 4 plays, 82 yards, 1:14.
- SFA – Carlos Alvarado 31-yard field goal, 5:59. Lumberjacks 10–7. Drive: 8 plays, 7 yards, 4:20.

Second quarter

- SFA – Jaylen Jenkins 1-yard run (Carlos Alvarado kick), 11:29. Lumberjacks 17–7. Drive: 7 plays, 68 yards, 3:23.
- SFA – Makai Frisby 35-yard interception return (Carlos Alvarado kick), 5:27. Lumberjacks 24–7.

Third quarter

- SFA – Clayton Wayland 35-yard pass from Gavin Rutherford (Carlos Alvarado kick), 12:10. Lumberjacks 31–7. Drive: 3 plays, 21 yards, 1:09.
- MCN – Omiri Wiggins 75-yard run (Deaglan Camron kick BLOCKED), 11:08. Lumberjacks 31–13. Drive: 3 plays, 75 yards, 1:02.
- SFA – Stetson Sarratt 33-yard pass from Gavin Rutherford (Carlos Alvarado kick), 0:25. Lumberjacks 38–13. Drive: 7 plays, 65 yards, 1:59.

Fourth quarter

- MCN – Omiri Wiggins 7-yard pass from Devin Lippold (Deaglan Camron kick), 12:45. Lumberjacks 38–20. Drive: 8 plays, 75 yards, 2:40.
- MCN – Devin Lippold 1-yard run (Deaglan Camron kick), 8:37. Lumberjacks 38–27. Drive: 7 plays, 57 yards, 2:31.

Statistics	SFA	MCN
First downs	23	18
Plays–yards	68–439	65–407
Rushes–yards	39–137	33–199
Passing yards	302	208
Passing: comp–att–int	18–29–2	19–32–2
Turnovers	3	3
Time of possession	31:47	28:13

Team	Category	Player	Statistics
Stephen F. Austin	Passing	Gavin Rutherford	18/29, 302 yards, 3 TD, 2 INT
Stephen F. Austin	Rushing	Jaylen Jenkins	19 carries, 82 yards, TD
Stephen F. Austin	Receiving	Bugs Mortimer	2 receptions, 72 yards, TD
McNeese	Passing	Devin Lippold	10/18, 118 yards, TD, INT
McNeese	Rushing	Omiri Wiggins	12 carries, 126 yards, TD
McNeese	Receiving	Curtis Deville	4 receptions, 71 yards

=== East Texas A&M ===
East Texas A&M Lions (0–1) at No. 13 Stephen F. Austin Lumberjacks (1–0) – Game summary

Quarter	1	2	3	4	Total
Lions	7	0	0	0	7
No. 13 Lumberjacks	7	17	7	13	44

at Homer Bryce Stadium • Nacogdoches, Texas

- Date: September 5
- Game time: 7:00 p.m.
- Game weather: Cloudy • Temperature: 82 °F (28 °C) • Wind: S 5 mph
- Game attendance: 6,772
- Referee: Matt Beck
- TV: ESPN+

Game information

First quarter

- SFA – JT Kitna 1-yard run (Carlos Alvarado kick), 4:50. Lumberjacks 7–0. Drive: 12 plays, 65 yards, 5:54.
- ETAM – Andrez Lewis 21-yard pass from Eric Rodriguez (Ozlo Rigby kick), 2:02. Tied 7–7. Drive: 6 plays, 83 yards, 2:42.

Second quarter

- SFA – Gavin Rutherford 11-yard run (Carlos Alvarado kick), 14:14. Lumberjacks 14–7. Drive: 7 plays, 47 yards, 2:39.
- SFA – Gavin Rutherford 4-yard run (Carlos Alvarado kick), 11:56. Lumberjacks 21–7. Drive: 3 plays, 58 yards, 1:20.
- SFA – Carlos Alvarado 23-yard field goal, 0:00. Lumberjacks 24–7. Drive: 4 plays, -3 yards, 1:18.

Third quarter

- SFA – Jaylen Jenkins 40-yard run (Carlos Alvarado kick), 10:56. Lumberjacks 31–7. Drive: 2 plays, 39 yards, 0:42.

Fourth quarter

- SFA – Carlos Alvarado 37-yard field goal, 11:44. Lumberjacks 34–7. Drive: 7 plays, 19 yards, 3:01.
- SFA – Carlos Alvarado 26-yard field goal, 5:35. Lumberjacks 37–7. Drive: 8 plays, 20 yards, 5:35.
- SFA – Cannon Lemberg 2-yard pass from Bryson Broadway (Carlos Alvarado kick), 1:01. Lumberjacks 44–7. Drive: 7 plays, 55 yards, 2:57.

Statistics	ETAM	SFA
First downs	12	25
Plays–yards	46–187	77–434
Rushes–yards	22–56	46–256
Passing yards	131	178
Passing: comp–att–int	13–24–3	22–31–0
Turnovers	4	1
Time of possession	20:32	39:28

Team	Category	Player	Statistics
East Texas A&M	Passing	Eric Rodriguez	9/16, 110 yards, TD, 2 INT
East Texas A&M	Rushing	Quay Middlebrooks	5 carries, 31 yards
East Texas A&M	Receiving	Micah Simpson	4 receptions, 58 yards
Stephen F. Austin	Passing	Gavin Rutherford	16/21, 140 yards
Stephen F. Austin	Rushing	Preston Alford	6 carries, 76 yards
Stephen F. Austin	Receiving	Clayton Wayland	4 receptions, 46 yards

=== at No. 23 Abilene Christian ===
No. 13 Stephen F. Austin Lumberjacks (2–0) at No. 23 Abilene Christian Wildcats (0–2) – Game summary

Quarter	1	2	3	4	Total
No. 13 Lumberjacks	0	20	0	6	26
No. 23 Wildcats	7	0	0	0	7

at Wildcat Stadium • Abilene, Texas

- Date: September 12
- Game time: 7:00 p.m.
- Game weather: Sunny 98 °F (37 °C)
- Game attendance: 7739
- Referee: Andrew Isom

Game information

First quarter
Second quarter
Third quarter
Fourth quarter

Statistics	SFA	ACU
First downs	20	17
Plays–yards	66-459	62-300
Rushes–yards	35-216	24-33
Passing yards	243	267
Passing: comp–att–int	17-31-0	21-38-1
Turnovers	0	1
Time of possession	30:50	29:10

Team	Category	Player	Statistics
Stephen F. Austin	Passing		
Stephen F. Austin	Rushing		
Stephen F. Austin	Receiving		
Abilene Christian	Passing		
Abilene Christian	Rushing		
Abilene Christian	Receiving		

=== at Prairie View A&M ===
No. 12 Stephen F. Austin Lumberjacks (3–0) at Prairie View A&M Panthers (1–2) – Game summary

Quarter	1	2	3	4	Total
No. 12 Lumberjacks	0	0	0	0	0
Panthers	0	0	0	0	0

at Panther Stadium • Prairie View, Texas

- Date: September 19
- Game time: 7:00 p.m.

Game information

First quarter
Second quarter
Third quarter
Fourth quarter

Statistics	SFA	PV
First downs		
Plays–yards		
Rushes–yards		
Passing yards		
Passing: comp–att–int		
Turnovers		
Time of possession		

Team	Category	Player	Statistics
Stephen F. Austin	Passing		
Stephen F. Austin	Rushing		
Stephen F. Austin	Receiving		
Prairie View A&M	Passing		
Prairie View A&M	Rushing		
Prairie View A&M	Receiving		

=== No. 15 (DII) Northeastern State ===
No. 15 (DII) Northeastern State RiverHawks (3–1) at No. 9 Stephen F. Austin Lumberjacks (4–0) – Game summary

Quarter	1	2	3	4	Total
No. 15 (DII) RiverHawks	0	7	7	0	14
No. 9 Lumberjacks	21	21	14	7	63

at Homer Bryce Stadium • Nacogdoches, Texas

- Date: September 26
- Game time: 5:00 p.m.
- Game weather: Sunny • Temperature: 86 °F (30 °C) • Wind: NW at 3 miles per hour (4.8 km/h)
- Game attendance: 10,043
- Referee: James Brookhart
- TV announcers (ESPN+): Rob Myers (play-by-play), Hunter Taylor (analyst) and Nicole Beckelman (sideline)

Game information

First quarter

- (10:30) SFA – Gavin Rutherford 6-yard run, Carlos Alvarado kick (Drive: 12 plays, 73 yards, 4:25; Stephen F. Austin 7–0)
- (8:46) SFA – Jaylen Jenkins 55-yard run, Carlos Alvarado kick (Drive: 1 play, 55 yards, 0:11; Stephen F. Austin 14–0)
- (4:32) SFA – Bugs Mortimer 41-yard pass from Gavin Rutherford, Carlos Alvarado kick (Drive: 3 plays, 44 yards, 0:42; Stephen F. Austin 21–0)

Second quarter

- (14:56) SFA – Stetson Sarratt 9-yard pass from Gavin Rutherford, Carlos Alvarado kick (Drive: 6 plays, 61 yards, 2:27; Stephen F. Austin 28–0)
- (12:14) SFA – Aiden Meeks 29-yard pass from Gavin Rutherford, Carlos Alvarado kick (Drive: 5 plays, 66 yards, 2:10; Stephen F. Austin 35–0)
- (3:09) SFA – Kylon Harris 35-yard pass from Gavin Rutherford, Carlos Alvarado kick (Drive: 5 plays, 64 yards, 1:24; Stephen F. Austin 42–0)
- (0:08) NEST – Deuce Roberson 11-yard pass from Donnie Smith, Troy Nguyen kick (Drive: 7 plays, 86 yards, 2:56; Stephen F. Austin 42–7)

Third quarter

- (4:47) SFA – Preston Alford 4-yard run, Carlos Alvarado kick (Drive: 12 plays, 99 yards, 5:55; Stephen F. Austin 49–7)
- (2:19) NEST – Malachi Butler 25-yard pass from Donnie Smith, Troy Nguyen kick (Drive: 6 plays, 63 yards, 2:20; Stephen F. Austin 49–14)
- (1:57) SFA – Jeffery Jones 70-yard run, Carlos Alvarado kick (Drive: 1 play, 70 yards, 0:15; Stephen F. Austin 56–14)

Fourth quarter

- (5:32) SFA – Emiril Gant 41-yard fumble recovery, Carlos Alvarado kick (Stephen F. Austin 63–14)

Statistics	NEST	SFA
First downs	27	26
Plays–yards	88–478	58–617
Rushes–yards	30–83	29–232
Passing yards	395	385
Passing: comp–att–int	30–58–1	21–29–2
Turnovers	2	2
Time of possession	37:09	22:51

Team	Category	Player	Statistics
Northeastern State	Passing	Donnie Smith	22/42, 326 yards, 2 TD
Northeastern State	Rushing	Marco Smith	4 carries, 31 yards
Northeastern State	Receiving	Deuce Roberson	8 receptions, 121 yards, TD
Stephen F. Austin	Passing	Gavin Rutherford	16/23, 299 yards, 4 TD, 2 INT
Stephen F. Austin	Rushing	Jaylen Jenkins	9 carries, 94 yards, TD
Stephen F. Austin	Receiving	Kylon Harris	3 receptions, 109 yards, TD

=== Incarnate Word ===
Incarnate Word Cardinals (2–2) at No. 7 Stephen F. Austin Lumberjacks (5–0) – Game summary

Quarter	1	2	3	4	Total
Cardinals	3	10	7	6	26
No. 7 Lumberjacks	14	0	7	7	28

at Homer Bryce Stadium • Nacogdoches, Texas

- Date: October 3
- Game time: 5:00 p.m.
- Game weather: Cloudy • Temperature: 82 °F (28 °C) • Wind: SW at 9 miles per hour (14 km/h)
- Game attendance: 8,675
- Referee: Matt Beck
- TV announcers (ESPN+): Rob Meyers (play-by-play), Hunter Taylor (analyst) and Nicole Beckelman (sideline)

Game information

First quarter

- SFA – 13:39 Jaylen Jenkins 45 yard pass from Gavin Rutherford, Carlos Alvarado kick
  SFA 7–0 Drive: 3 plays, 65 yards, 1:02
- UIW – 10:35 Nick Rigas 39 yard field goal
  SFA 7–3 Drive: 10 plays, 67 yards, 3:04
- SFA – 0:55 JT Kitna 2 yard run, Carlos Alvarado kick
  SFA 14–3 Drive: 8 plays, 55 yards, 3:00

Second quarter

- UIW – 13:08 Nick Rigas 43 yard field goal
  SFA 14–6 Drive: 9 plays, 50 yards, 2:47
- UIW – 5:44 Isaiah Champagne 10 yard pass from Emmett Brown, Nick Rigas kick
  SFA 14–13 Drive: 5 plays, 63 yards, 1:55

Third quarter

- UIW – 8:35 David Rasor 1 yard run, Nick Rigas kick
  UIW 20–14 Drive: 10 plays, 70 yards, 4:28
- SFA – 4:07 Preston Alford 8 yard pass from Gavin Rutherford, Carlos Alvarado kick
  SFA 21–20 Drive: 3 plays, 56 yards, 0:41

Fourth quarter

- SFA – 14:55 Clayton Wayland 8 yard pass from Gavin Rutherford, Carlos Alvarado kick
  SFA 28–20 Drive: 7 plays, 82 yards, 2:52
- UIW – 0:22 Jacob Emmers 53 yard pass from Emmett Brown, 2-point conversion failed
  SFA 28–26 Drive: 4 plays, 75 yards, 0:26

Statistics	UIW	SFA
First downs	26	24
Plays–yards	79–470	73–425
Rushes–yards	27–98	39–134
Passing yards	372	291
Passing: comp–att–int	27–52–2	26–34–1
Turnovers	2	1
Time of possession	27:38	32:22

Team	Category	Player	Statistics
Incarnate Word	Passing	Emmett Brown	27/52, 372 yards, 2 TD, 2 INT
Incarnate Word	Rushing	Jayden Hibbler	8 carries, 57 yards
Incarnate Word	Receiving	Jameson Garcia	4 receptions, 86 yards
Stephen F. Austin	Passing	Gavin Rutherford	26/34, 291 yards, 3 TD, INT
Stephen F. Austin	Rushing	Jeffery Jones	14 carries, 70 yards
Stephen F. Austin	Receiving	Clayton Wayland	5 receptions, 104 yards, TD

=== at Nicholls ===
No. 3 Stephen F. Austin Lumberjacks (6–0) at Nicholls Colonels (2–4) – Game summary

Quarter	1	2	3	4	Total
No. 3 Lumberjacks	0	0	0	0	0
Colonels	0	0	0	0	0

at Manning Field at John L. Guidry Stadium • Thibodaux, Louisiana

- Date: October 17
- Game time: 3:00 p.m.

Game information

First quarter
Second quarter
Third quarter
Fourth quarter

Statistics	SFA	NICH
First downs		
Plays–yards		
Rushes–yards		
Passing yards		
Passing: comp–att–int		
Turnovers		
Time of possession		

Team	Category	Player	Statistics
Stephen F. Austin	Passing		
Stephen F. Austin	Rushing		
Stephen F. Austin	Receiving		
Nicholls	Passing		
Nicholls	Rushing		
Nicholls	Receiving		

=== No. 23 Southeastern Louisiana ===
No. 23 Southeastern Louisiana Lions (4–3) at No. 2 Stephen F. Austin Lumberjacks (7–0) – Game summary

Quarter	1	2	3	4	Total
No. 23 Lions	0	0	0	0	0
No. 2 Lumberjacks	0	0	0	0	0

at Homer Bryce Stadium • Nacogdoches, Texas

- Date: October 24
- Game time: 5:00 p.m.

Game information

First quarter
Second quarter
Third quarter
Fourth quarter

Statistics	SELA	SFA
First downs		
Plays–yards		
Rushes–yards		
Passing yards		
Passing: comp–att–int		
Turnovers		
Time of possession		

Team	Category	Player	Statistics
Southeastern Louisiana	Passing		
Southeastern Louisiana	Rushing		
Southeastern Louisiana	Receiving		
Stephen F. Austin	Passing		
Stephen F. Austin	Rushing		
Stephen F. Austin	Receiving		

=== Houston Christian ===
Houston Christian Huskies (4–4) at No. 2 Stephen F. Austin Lumberjacks (8–0) – Game summary

Quarter	1	2	3	4	Total
Huskies	0	0	0	0	0
No. 2 Lumberjacks	0	0	0	0	0

at Homer Bryce Stadium • Nacogdoches, Texas

- Date: October 31
- Game time: 2:00 p.m.

Game information

First quarter
Second quarter
Third quarter
Fourth quarter

Statistics	HCU	SFA
First downs		
Plays–yards		
Rushes–yards		
Passing yards		
Passing: comp–att–int		
Turnovers		
Time of possession		

Team	Category	Player	Statistics
Houston Christian	Passing		
Houston Christian	Rushing		
Houston Christian	Receiving		
Stephen F. Austin	Passing		
Stephen F. Austin	Rushing		
Stephen F. Austin	Receiving		

=== at No. 13 Lamar ===
No. 2 Stephen F. Austin Lumberjacks (9–0) at No. 13 Lamar Cardinals (7–2) – Game summary

Quarter	1	2	3	4	Total
No. 2 Lumberjacks	0	0	0	0	0
No. 13 Cardinals	0	0	0	0	0

at Provost Umphrey Stadium • Beaumont, Texas

- Date: November 7

Game information

First quarter
Second quarter
Third quarter
Fourth quarter

Statistics	SFA	LAM
First downs		
Plays–yards		
Rushes–yards		
Passing yards		
Passing: comp–att–int		
Turnovers		
Time of possession		

Team	Category	Player	Statistics
Stephen F. Austin	Passing		
Stephen F. Austin	Rushing		
Stephen F. Austin	Receiving		
Lamar	Passing		
Lamar	Rushing		
Lamar	Receiving		

=== at UT Rio Grande Valley ===
No. 7т Stephen F. Austin Lumberjacks (9–1) at UT Rio Grande Valley Vaqueros (5–5) – Game summary

Quarter	1	2	3	4	Total
No. 7т Lumberjacks	0	0	0	0	0
Vaqueros	0	0	0	0	0

at Robert and Janet Vackar Stadium • Edinburg, Texas

- Date: November 14
- Game time: 5:00 p.m.

Game information

First quarter
Second quarter
Third quarter
Fourth quarter

Statistics	SFA	RGV
First downs		
Plays–yards		
Rushes–yards		
Passing yards		
Passing: comp–att–int		
Turnovers		
Time of possession		

Team	Category	Player	Statistics
Stephen F. Austin	Passing		
Stephen F. Austin	Rushing		
Stephen F. Austin	Receiving		
UT Rio Grande Valley	Passing		
UT Rio Grande Valley	Rushing		
UT Rio Grande Valley	Receiving		

=== Northwestern State (Chief Caddo) ===
Northwestern State Demons (0–11) at No. 5 Stephen F. Austin Lumberjacks (10–1) – Game summary

Quarter	1	2	3	4	Total
Demons	0	0	0	0	0
No. 5 Lumberjacks	0	0	0	0	0

at Homer Bryce Stadium • Nacogdoches, Texas

- Date: November 19
- Game time: 6:00 p.m.

Game information

First quarter
Second quarter
Third quarter
Fourth quarter

Statistics	NWST	SFA
First downs		
Plays–yards		
Rushes–yards		
Passing yards		
Passing: comp–att–int		
Turnovers		
Time of possession		

Team	Category	Player	Statistics
Northwestern State	Passing		
Northwestern State	Rushing		
Northwestern State	Receiving		
Stephen F. Austin	Passing		
Stephen F. Austin	Rushing		
Stephen F. Austin	Receiving		

== Rankings ==
Ranking movements Legend: ██ Increase in ranking ██ Decrease in ranking т = Tied with team above or below ( ) = First-place votes
	Week														
Poll	Pre	1	2	3	4	5	6	7	8	9	10	11	12	13	Final
STATS	13	13	13	12	9	7	7	3	2 (4)	2 (5)	2 (7)	7т	5		
Coaches	13	11	9	8	6	5	4	3	2 (2)	2 (1)	2 (3)	7	4		
