= 2026 Nicholls Colonels football team =

American college football season

2026 Nicholls Colonels football
- Conference: Southland Conference
- Record: 4–8 (3–6 SLC)
- Head coach: Tommy Rybacki (2nd season)
- Offensive coordinator: Matt Giampa (1st season)
- Defensive coordinator: Darion Monroe (2nd season)
- Base defense: Multiple 4–3
- Home stadium: Manning Field at John L. Guidry Stadium

2026 Southland Conference football standings
	Conf.			Overall
Team	W		L	W		L
No. 4 Lamar	7	–	1	9	–	2
No. 5 Stephen F. Austin	7	–	1	10	–	1
No. 21 Incarnate Word	6	–	2	7	–	4
McNeese	4	–	4	5	–	6
Houston Christian	4	–	4	5	–	6
Nicholls	3	–	5	4	–	7
East Texas A&M	3	–	5	3	–	8
UT Rio Grande Valley	3	–	5	5	–	6
Southeastern Louisiana	3	–	5	5	–	6
Northwestern State	0	–	8	0	–	11
As of November 20, 2026; Rankings from STATS Poll

The 2026 Nicholls Colonels football team represented Nicholls State University in the 2026 NCAA Division I FCS football season. The Colonels played their home games at Manning Field at John L. Guidry Stadium in Thibodaux, Louisiana, and competed in the Southland Conference. They were led by second-year head coach Tommy Rybacki.

== Offseason ==
=== Outgoing ===
Player	Position	Destination
Miequle Brock Jr.	RB	Tarleton State
Jake Dalmado	LB	Southeastern Louisiana
Jackson Firmin	QB	Pearl River CC
Camare Hampton	WR	Itawamba CC
Everett Hunter	TE	South Alabama
Landon Ibieta	WR	Southeastern Louisiana
Josh Johnson	DL	Southern Miss
Ja'Mard Jones	OL	LSU
Solomon Lewis	WR	McNeese
Rasheed Lovelace	DT	James Madison
Joe Mason	DL	Unknown
Aidan McCowan	CB	Georgia Southern
Noah Onyia	TE	Hutchinson CC
Scrappy Osby	WR	Unknown
Anthony Rogers	DB	Tulane
Braxton Scriber	OL	Arkansas
Tasmin Showers	DB	Kilgore

=== Incoming ===
Player	Position	Previous school
Peyton Depolitte	DB	Millsaps
Zavian Dilworth	DB	Eastern Michigan
Malik Ellis	OL	Troy
Jacob Godfrey	WR	Louisiana–Monroe
Wyatt Guidry	K	Ottawa (Arizona)
Ashton Guilbeau	K/P	UT Martin
Lynard Harris	DB	Louisiana–Monroe
Kennon Loftin	LB	Western Kentucky
Jason Malbrue	WR	Southeastern Louisiana
Devin Scura	TE	UTSA
Jhamal Shelby Jr.	DB	Louisiana Tech
Ellis Stewart	WR	Arkansas–Pine Bluff
Christian White	WR	Mississippi Valley State
Keven Williams	RB	Southern Virginia

== Schedule ==
Date	Time	Opponent	Site	TV	Result	Attendance
August 27	6:00 pm	Mississippi Valley State*	Manning Field at John L. Guidry Stadium; Thibodaux, LA	ESPN+	W 44–10	3,582
September 5	6:00 pm	at Kansas State*	Bill Snyder Family Football Stadium; Manhattan, KS	ESPN+	L 3–71	51,719
September 12	6:00 pm	UT Rio Grande Valley	Manning Field at John L. Guidry Stadium; Thibodaux, LA	ESPN+	W 31–28	6,888
September 19	6:00 pm	at Sam Houston*	Bowers Stadium; Huntsville, TX	ESPN+	L 0–59	12,182
September 26	3:00 pm	No. 15 Lamar	Manning Field at John L. Guidry Stadium; Thibodaux, LA	ESPN+	L 18–49	5,477
October 3	6:00 pm	at Houston Christian	Husky Stadium; Houston, TX	ESPN+	L 2–16	1,696
October 17	3:00 pm	No. 3 Stephen F. Austin	Manning Field at John L. Guidry Stadium; Thibodaux, LA	ESPN+	L 0–56	5,022
October 24	2:00 pm	at Northwestern State	Harry Turpin Stadium; Natchitoches, LA (NSU Challenge)	ESPN+	W 31–27	3,081
October 31	2:00 pm	at McNeese	Navarre Stadium; Lake Charles, LA	ESPN+	L 3–16	3,050
November 7	3:00 pm	East Texas A&M^{†}	Manning Field at John L. Guidry Stadium; Thibodaux, LA	ESPN+	W 32–31	8,955
November 14	3:00 pm	at No. 22 Incarnate Word	Gayle and Tom Benson Stadium; San Antonio, TX	ESPN+	L 24–42	3,312
November 19	6:00 pm	Southeastern Louisiana	Manning Field at John L. Guidry Stadium; Thibodaux, LA (River Bell Classic)	ESPN+	L 10–38	6,322
*Non-conference game; ^{†}Homecoming; Rankings from STATS Poll released prior to the game; All times are in Central time

== Game summaries ==
=== Mississippi Valley State ===
Mississippi Valley State Delta Devils (0–0) at Nicholls Colonels (0–0) – Game summary

Quarter	1	2	3	4	Total
Delta Devils	0	0	0	10	10
Colonels	14	23	7	0	44

at John L. Guidry Stadium • Thibodaux, Louisiana

- Date: August 27
- Game time: 6:00 p.m. CDT
- Game weather: Cloudy
- Game attendance: 3,582
- Referee: Gary Leeper
- TV announcers (ESPN+): Jeff Palermo and Wayde Keiser

Game information

First quarter

- NICH – Jordan Smith 59-yard pass from Ean Rodrigue (Kingston Phan kick), 7:02. Colonels 7–0. Drive: 3 plays, 66 yards, 1:16.
- NICH – Greg Donaldson 74-yard pass from Ean Rodrigue (Kingston Phan kick), 4:51. Colonels 14–0. Drive: 2 plays, 85 yards, 0:30.

Second quarter

- NICH – Kingston Phan 42-yard field goal, 14:55. Colonels 17–0. Drive: 10 plays, 35 yards, 4:08.
- NICH – Tamaj Hoffman 13-yard run (Kingston Phan kick), 5:12. Colonels 24–0. Drive: 7 plays, 72 yards, 3:16.
- NICH – Tamaj Hoffman 7-yard run (Kingston Phan kick), 0:55. Colonels 31–0. Drive: 7 plays, 52 yards, 1:20.
- NICH – Jordan Smith 21-yard pass from Ean Rodrigue (Kingston Phan kick failed), 0:30. Colonels 37–0. Drive: 2 plays, 21 yards, 0:11.

Third quarter

- NICH – Damondrick Blackburn 2-yard run (Wyatt Guidry kick), 9:48. Colonels 44–0. Drive: 10 plays, 39 yards, 4:30.

Fourth quarter

- MVSU – Tyrell Johnson 95-yard interception return (Luka Sari kick), 10:58. Colonels 44–7.
- MVSU – Luka Sari 34-yard field goal, 8:14. Colonels 44–10. Drive: 5 plays, 34 yards, 1:17.

Statistics	MVSU	NICH
First downs	10	26
Plays–yards	52–228	82–515
Rushes–yards	30–149	41–168
Passing yards	79	347
Passing: comp–att–int	12–22–3	25–41–2
Turnovers	6	2
Time of possession	26:15	33:45

Team	Category	Player	Statistics
Mississippi Valley State	Passing	Josh Brown	11/19, 44 yards, 3 INT
Mississippi Valley State	Rushing	Josh Brown	8 carries, 62 yards
Mississippi Valley State	Receiving	Nicholas Buggs	1 reception, 35 yards
Nicholls	Passing	Ean Rodrigue	16/25, 264 yards, 3 TD, INT
Nicholls	Rushing	Tamaj Hoffman	7 carries, 53 yards, 2 TD
Nicholls	Receiving	Greg Donaldson	3 receptions, 100 yards, TD

=== at Kansas State (FBS) ===
Nicholls Colonels (1–0) at Kansas State Wildcats (FBS) (0–0) – Game summary

Quarter	1	2	3	4	Total
Colonels	0	3	0	0	3
Wildcats (FBS)	22	14	21	14	71

at Bill Snyder Family Football Stadium • Manhattan, Kansas

- Date: September 5
- Game time: 6:00 p.m. CDT
- Game weather: 98 degrees, cloudy, wind SE 8 mph
- Game attendance: 51,719
- Referee: Henry Jones
- TV announcers (ESPN+): Mark Neely and Jeff Woody

Game information

First quarter

- KSU – Jaron Tibbs 7-yard pass from Avery Johnson (Luis Rodriguez kick), 12:36. Wildcats 7–0. Drive: 6 plays, 77 yards, 2:20.
- KSU – Avery Johnson 10-yard run (Linkon Cure run), 6:59. Wildcats 15–0. Drive: 8 plays, 46 yards, 4:04.
- KSU – Brandon White 65-yard punt return (Luis Rodriguez kick), 0:29. Wildcats 22–0.

Second quarter

- KSU – Rodney Fields Jr. 26-yard run (Luis Rodriguez kick), 10:09. Wildcats 29–0. Drive: 6 plays, 65 yards, 3:23.
- NICH – Kingston Phan 32-yard field goal, 5:48. Wildcats 29–3. Drive: 11 plays, 60 yards, 4:21.
- KSU – Joe Jackson 43-yard pass from Avery Johnson (Luis Rodriguez kick), 1:58. Wildcats 36–3. Drive: 8 plays, 77 yards, 3:39.

Third quarter

- KSU – Josh Manning 11-yard pass from Avery Johnson (Robert Hammond III kick), 8:28. Wildcats 43–3. Drive: 8 plays, 62 yards, 3:49.
- KSU – Joe Jackson 11-yard run (Robert Hammond III kick), 5:52. Wildcats 50–3. Drive: 4 plays, 24 yards, 1:59.
- KSU – Jay Harris 11-yard run (Robert Hammond III kick), 2:08. Wildcats 57–3. Drive: 7 plays, 67 yards, 2:20.

Fourth quarter

- KSU – Monterrio Elston Jr. 46-yard run (Robert Hammond III kick), 13:19. Wildcats 64–3. Drive: 4 plays, 62 yards, 2:17.
- KSU – Jacob Knuth 2-yard run (Aidan O'Neill kick), 8:02. Wildcats 71–3. Drive: 7 plays, 57 yards, 3:17.

Statistics	NICH	KSU
First downs	9	34
Plays–yards	58–122	71–559
Rushes–yards	39–92	44–312
Passing yards	30	247
Passing: comp–att–int	7–18–0	20–27–0
Turnovers	1	1
Time of possession	26:17	33:43

Team	Category	Player	Statistics
Nicholls	Passing	Ean Rodrigue	7/19, 30 yards
Nicholls	Rushing	Tamaj Hoffman	9 carries, 43 yards
Nicholls	Receiving	Jordan Smith	2 receptions, 14 yards
Kansas State	Passing	Avery Johnson	15/21, 199 yards, 3 TD
Kansas State	Rushing	Rodney Fields Jr.	14 carries, 103 yards, TD
Kansas State	Receiving	Joe Jackson	2 receptions, 48 yards, TD

=== UT Rio Grande Valley ===
UT Rio Grande Valley Vaqueros (1–1) at Nicholls Colonels (1–1) – Game summary

Quarter	1	2	3	4	Total
Vaqueros	0	14	0	14	28
Colonels	7	10	14	0	31

at John L. Guidry Stadium • Thibodaux, Louisiana

- Date: September 12
- Game time: 6:00 p.m. CDT
- Game weather: Cloudy • Temperature: 80 °F (27 °C) • Wind: SW 5 mph
- Game attendance: 6,888
- Referee: James Brookhart
- TV: ESPN+

Game information

First quarter

- (11:15) NICH – Jackson Dufrene 18-yard pass from Ean Rodrigue, Kingston Phan kick (Drive: 6 plays, 31 yards, 1:48; Nicholls 7–0)

Second quarter

- (14:22) NICH – Jackson Dufrene 20-yard pass from Ean Rodrigue, Kingston Phan kick (Drive: 12 plays, 80 yards, 4:19; Nicholls 14–0)
- (11:45) RGV – Kyran Lee 29-yard pass from Garret Rangel, Brysen Gardner kick (Drive: 6 plays, 58 yards, 2:31; Nicholls 14–7)
- (4:25) RGV – TJ Dement 1-yard run, Brysen Gardner kick (Drive: 2 plays, 3 yards, 0:23; Tied 14–14)
- (3:23) NICH – Kingston Phan 32-yard field goal (Drive: 6 plays, 60 yards, 1:02; Nicholls 17–14)

Third quarter

- (6:31) NICH – Jackson Dufrene 3-yard pass from Ean Rodrigue, Kingston Phan kick (Drive: 17 plays, 75 yards, 8:29; Nicholls 24–14)
- (2:06) NICH – Shane Lee 10-yard pass from Ean Rodrigue, Kingston Phan kick (Drive: 6 plays, 47 yards, 2:13; Nicholls 31–14)

Fourth quarter

- (8:59) RGV – Jaydon Smith 36-yard pass from Aidan Jakobsohn, Brysen Gardner kick (Drive: 14 plays, 77 yards, 5:42; Nicholls 31–21)
- (0:57) RGV – Christian Sabsook 7-yard pass from Aidan Jakobsohn, Brysen Gardner kick (Drive: 11 plays, 71 yards, 2:35; Nicholls 31–28)

Statistics	RGV	NICH
First downs	21	21
Plays–yards	78–327	75–322
Rushes–yards	33–63	39–86
Passing yards	264	236
Passing: comp–att–int	19–45–2	21–36–1
Time of possession	29:44	30:16

Team	Category	Player	Statistics
UT Rio Grande Valley	Passing	Aidan Jakobsohn	7/17, 137 yards, 2 TD
UT Rio Grande Valley	Rushing	Brennan Carroll	8 carries, 36 yards
UT Rio Grande Valley	Receiving	Kyran Lee	8 receptions, 125 yards, TD
Nicholls	Passing	Ean Rodrigue	21/36, 236 yards, 4 TD, INT
Nicholls	Rushing	Shane Lee	13 carries, 47 yards
Nicholls	Receiving	Jackson Dufrene	5 receptions, 100 yards, 3 TD

=== at Sam Houston (FBS) ===
Nicholls Colonels (2–1) at Sam Houston Bearkats (FBS) (0–2) – Game summary

Quarter	1	2	3	4	Total
Colonels	0	0	0	0	0
Bearkats (FBS)	10	21	21	7	59

at Shell Energy Stadium • Huntsville, Texas

- Date: September 19
- Game time: 6:00 p.m. CDT
- Game weather: Sunny • Temperature: 90 °F (32 °C) • Wind: SE at 7 mph
- Game attendance: 12,182
- Referee: Jeremee Tate
- TV announcers (ESPN+): Randy McIlvoy (play-by-play), John Harris (analyst) and Kendra Sheehan (sideline)

Game information

First quarter

- SHSU – Tim Burns Jr. 65-yard pass from Landyn Locke (Sam Carpenter kick), 10:55. Bearkats 7–0. Drive: 3 plays, 69 yards, 1:16.
- SHSU – Sam Carpenter 33-yard field goal, 4:39. Bearkats 10–0. Drive: 5 plays, 25 yards, 2:36.

Second quarter

- SHSU – Grady O'Neill 3-yard pass from Landyn Locke (Sam Carpenter kick), 10:55. Bearkats 17–0. Drive: 6 plays, 82 yards, 1:58.
- SHSU – Landan Brown 5-yard run (Sam Carpenter kick), 6:44. Bearkats 24–0. Drive: 4 plays, 23 yards, 1:00.
- SHSU – Darrick Bledsoe III 11-yard pass from Landyn Locke (Sam Carpenter kick), 2:03. Bearkats 31–0. Drive: 8 plays, 75 yards, 3:25.

Third quarter

- SHSU – Kamari Maxwell 48-yard pass from Landyn Locke (Sam Carpenter kick), 14:27. Bearkats 38–0. Drive: 2 plays, 59 yards, 0:26.
- SHSU – Alton McCaskill 5-yard run (Sam Carpenter kick), 5:14. Bearkats 45–0. Drive: 14 plays, 80 yards, 7:56.
- SHSU – Kyan Berry-Johnson 61-yard pass from Brett Holloway (Sam Carpenter kick), 2:19. Bearkats 52–0. Drive: 3 plays, 70 yards, 1:27.

Fourth quarter

- SHSU – Brett Holloway 10-yard run (Sam Carpenter kick), 4:45. Bearkats 59–0. Drive: 10 plays, 55 yards, 5:56.

Statistics	NICH	SHSU
First downs	10	26
Plays–yards	59–163	75–619
Rushes–yards	36–124	43–233
Passing yards	39	386
Passing: comp–att–int	7–23–2	22–32–0
Turnovers	3	0
Time of possession	24:29	35:31

Team	Category	Player	Statistics
Nicholls	Passing	Ean Rodrigue	7/21, 39 yards, 2 INT
Nicholls	Rushing	Tamaj Hoffman	9 carries, 56 yards
Nicholls	Receiving	Jordan Smith	2 receptions, 21 yards
Sam Houston	Passing	Landyn Locke	19/28, 322 yards, 4 TD
Sam Houston	Rushing	Jerrian Parker Jr.	6 carries, 52 yards
Sam Houston	Receiving	Kamari Maxwell	2 receptions, 86 yards, TD

=== No. 15 Lamar ===
No. 15 Lamar Cardinals (2–1) at Nicholls Colonels (2–2) – Game summary

Quarter	1	2	3	4	Total
No. 15 Cardinals	0	0	0	0	0
Colonels	0	0	0	0	0

at John L. Guidry Stadium • Thibodaux, Louisiana

- Date: September 26
- Game time: 3:00 p.m. CDT
- TV: ESPN+

Game information

First quarter
Second quarter
Third quarter
Fourth quarter

Statistics	LAM	NICH
First downs		
Plays–yards		
Rushes–yards		
Passing yards		
Passing: comp–att–int		
Time of possession		

Team	Category	Player	Statistics
Lamar	Passing		
Lamar	Rushing		
Lamar	Receiving		
Nicholls	Passing		
Nicholls	Rushing		
Nicholls	Receiving		

=== at Houston Christian ===
Nicholls Colonels (2–3) at Houston Christian Huskies (2–3) – Game summary

Quarter	1	2	Total
Colonels			0
Huskies			0

at Husky Stadium • Houston, Texas

- Date: October 3
- Game time: 6:00 p.m. CDT
- TV: ESPN+

Statistics	NICH	HCU
First downs		
Plays–yards		
Rushes–yards		
Passing yards		
Passing: comp–att–int		
Time of possession		

Team	Category	Player	Statistics
Nicholls	Passing		
Nicholls	Rushing		
Nicholls	Receiving		
Houston Christian	Passing		
Houston Christian	Rushing		
Houston Christian	Receiving		

=== No. 3 Stephen F. Austin ===
No. 3 Stephen F. Austin Lumberjacks (6–0) at Nicholls Colonels (2–4) – Game summary

Quarter	1	2	3	4	Total
No. 3 Lumberjacks	0	0	0	0	0
Colonels	0	0	0	0	0

at John L. Guidry Stadium • Thibodaux, Louisiana

- Date: October 17
- Game time: 3:00 p.m. CDT
- TV: ESPN+

Game information

First quarter
Second quarter
Third quarter
Fourth quarter

Statistics	SFA	NICH
First downs		
Plays–yards		
Rushes–yards		
Passing yards		
Passing: comp–att–int		
Time of possession		

Team	Category	Player	Statistics
Stephen F. Austin	Passing		
Stephen F. Austin	Rushing		
Stephen F. Austin	Receiving		
Nicholls	Passing		
Nicholls	Rushing		
Nicholls	Receiving		

=== at Northwestern State (NSU Challenge) ===
Nicholls Colonels (2–5) at Northwestern State Demons (0–7) – Game summary

Quarter	1	2	Total
Colonels			0
Demons			0

at Harry Turpin Stadium • Natchitoches, Louisiana

- Date: October 24
- Game time: 2:00 p.m. CDT
- TV: ESPN+

Statistics	NICH	NWST
First downs		
Plays–yards		
Rushes–yards		
Passing yards		
Passing: comp–att–int		
Time of possession		

Team	Category	Player	Statistics
Nicholls	Passing		
Nicholls	Rushing		
Nicholls	Receiving		
Northwestern State	Passing		
Northwestern State	Rushing		
Northwestern State	Receiving		

=== at McNeese ===
Nicholls Colonels (3–5) at McNeese Cowboys (3–5) – Game summary

Quarter	1	2	Total
Colonels			0
Cowboys			0

at Navarre Stadium • Lake Charles, Louisiana

- Date: October 31
- Game time: TBA p.m. CDT
- TV: ESPN+

Statistics	NICH	MCN
First downs		
Plays–yards		
Rushes–yards		
Passing yards		
Passing: comp–att–int		
Time of possession		

Team	Category	Player	Statistics
Nicholls	Passing		
Nicholls	Rushing		
Nicholls	Receiving		
McNeese	Passing		
McNeese	Rushing		
McNeese	Receiving		

=== East Texas A&M ===
East Texas A&M Lions (3–6) at Nicholls Colonels (3–6) – Game summary

Quarter	1	2	3	4	Total
Lions	0	0	0	0	0
Colonels	0	0	0	0	0

at John L. Guidry Stadium • Thibodaux, Louisiana

- Date: November 7
- Game time: 3:00 p.m. CDT
- TV: ESPN+

Game information

First quarter
Second quarter
Third quarter
Fourth quarter

Statistics	ETAM	NICH
First downs		
Plays–yards		
Rushes–yards		
Passing yards		
Passing: comp–att–int		
Time of possession		

Team	Category	Player	Statistics
East Texas A&M	Passing		
East Texas A&M	Rushing		
East Texas A&M	Receiving		
Nicholls	Passing		
Nicholls	Rushing		
Nicholls	Receiving		

=== at No. 22 Incarnate Word ===
Nicholls Colonels (4–6) at No. 22 Incarnate Word Cardinals (6–4) – Game summary

Quarter	1	2	3	4	Total
Colonels	7	10	7	0	24
No. 22 Cardinals	14	7	7	14	42

at Gayle and Tom Benson Stadium • San Antonio, Texas

- Date: November 14
- Game time: 2:00 p.m. CDT
- Game weather: Sunny • Temperature: 64 °F (18 °C) • Wind: NE at 9 miles per hour (14 km/h)
- Game attendance: 3,312
- Referee: James Brookhart
- TV: ESPN+

Game information

First quarter

- UIW – 13:12 Jayden Hibbler 17 yard run, Nick Rigas kick
  UIW 7–0 Drive: 7 plays, 65 yards, 1:48
- UIW – 6:31 Jacob Emmers 35 yard pass from Emmett Brown, Nick Rigas kick
  UIW 14–0 Drive: 6 plays, 82 yards, 2:25
- NICH – 1:33 Chase Richardson 33 yard run, Kingston Phan kick
  UIW 14–7 Drive: 9 plays, 75 yards, 4:58

Second quarter

- NICH – 10:01 Kingston Phan 35 yard field goal
  UIW 14–10 Drive: 14 plays, 36 yards, 6:30
- UIW – 7:04 Lontrell Turner 6 yard run, Nick Rigas kick
  UIW 21–10 Drive: 7 plays, 68 yards, 2:52
- NICH – 0:33 Devin Scura 28 yard pass from Preston Welch, Kingston Phan kick
  UIW 21–17 Drive: 6 plays, 80 yards, 1:16

Third quarter

- NICH – 10:56 Charlie Diedrich 7 yard interception return, Kingston Phan kick
  NICH 24–21
- UIW – 2:26 Dane Farley 4 yard pass from Emmett Brown, Nick Rigas kick
  UIW 28–24 Drive: 10 plays, 39 yards, 3:40

Fourth quarter

- UIW – 11:21 Isaiah Champagne 36 yard pass from Emmett Brown, Nick Rigas kick
  UIW 35–24 Drive: 8 plays, 79 yards, 2:47
- UIW – 1:59 Damashja Harris 5 yard run, Nick Rigas kick
  UIW 42–24 Drive: 10 plays, 58 yards, 3:43

Statistics	NICH	UIW
First downs	19	24
Plays–yards	75–385	69–433
Rushes–yards	51–263	45–233
Passing yards	122	200
Passing: comp–att–int	10–24–2	15–24–1
Turnovers	4	2
Time of possession	35:32	24:28

Team	Category	Player	Statistics
Nicholls	Passing	Preston Welch	5/17, 105 yards, TD, 2 INT
Nicholls	Rushing	Patrick Gales	19 carries, 88 yards
Nicholls	Receiving	Greg Donaldson	1 reception, 45 yards
Incarnate Word	Passing	Emmett Brown	15/24, 200 yards, 3 TD, INT
Incarnate Word	Rushing	Jayden Hibbler	20 carries, 115 yards, TD
Incarnate Word	Receiving	Roy Alexander	6 receptions, 79 yards

=== Southeastern Louisiana (River Bell Classic) ===
Southeastern Louisiana Lions (5–6) at Nicholls Colonels (4–7) – Game summary

Quarter	1	2	3	4	Total
Lions	0	0	0	0	0
Colonels	0	0	0	0	0

at John L. Guidry Stadium • Thibodaux, Louisiana

- Date: November 19
- Game time: 6:00 p.m. CDT
- TV: ESPN+

Game information

First quarter
Second quarter
Third quarter
Fourth quarter

Statistics	SELA	NICH
First downs		
Plays–yards		
Rushes–yards		
Passing yards		
Passing: comp–att–int		
Time of possession		

Team	Category	Player	Statistics
Southeastern Louisiana	Passing		
Southeastern Louisiana	Rushing		
Southeastern Louisiana	Receiving		
Nicholls	Passing		
Nicholls	Rushing		
Nicholls	Receiving		

== Personnel ==
2026 Nicholls Colonels football team roster
Players
Coaches
Offense

Pos.	#	Name	Class
WR	10	Brian McQuaide	Fr
QB	11	Ean Rodrigue	Jr
WR	12	Jordan Smith	GS
WR	13	Jackson Dufrene	Jr
QB	15	Preston Welch	Fr
QB	18	Chase Richardson	Jr
WR	19	Christian White	Sr
WR	23	Jason Barnes Jr.	Sr
RB	24	Shane Lee	So
RB	26	Jonathan Dartez	So
RB	31	Dedric Lastie	So
RB	32	Jayden Milton	Jr
RB	33	Keven Williams	Jr
RB	35	Tamaj Hoffman	Sr
TE	38	Jeffrey Diedrich	Fr
RB	39	Kayden Andoh	So
RB	40	Damondrick Blackburn	Jr
TE	41	Kyree Fuller	Jr
TE	42	McAllister Callejo	Fr
TE	45	Devin Scura	Jr
TE	47	Pax Hughes	Jr
FB	48	Scott White	Jr
OL	51	Malik Ellis	Jr
OL	52	Klabron Pollard	Sr
OL	56	Justin Howard	Jr
OL	59	Jacob Carpenter	Fr
OL	62	Joe Kirby	So
OL	63	Hamza Rahman	Jr
OL	64	Kyron Barnes	Sr
OL	65	Ryan Brungart	So
OL	66	Kamron Barnes	Sr
OL	67	Marcus Garcia	So
OL	70	Jacob Johnson	Jr
OL	71	Jacob Hood	Sr
OL	72	Thomas Ashe	Fr
OL	73	Raymond Johnson	Fr
OL	74	Preston Jones	So
OL	75	Enzo Marino	Fr
OL	76	Ryan Bernard	Sr
OL	77	Caleb Smith	So
OL	78	Trace Wegmann	Jr
OL	79	Beau Webb	So
WR	80	Amari Clayton	So
TE	81	Treylin Whaley	Sr
WR	82	Jason Malbrue	Sr
WR	83	Karaaz Johnson	Jr
WR	84	Paxton Lafont	So
WR	85	Christian McNees	Jr
WR	86	Ellis Stewart	So
WR	87	Jacob Godfrey	Jr
WR	88	Kylin Wheeler	So
TE	89	Jack Purser	So
QB		Cooper Babin	Fr
WR		Chantz Babineaux	Fr
TE		Brendan Farish	Fr
OL		Kohl Fulton	Fr
RB		Patrick Gales	Fr
OL		Cylis Hill	Fr
QB		Jack Landry	Fr
OL		Isaac Latulippe	Fr
WR		Isaiah LeBlanc	Fr
TE		Parker Smith	Fr
OL		Cooper Taylor	Fr
OL		Charlie Ward	Fr

Defense

Pos.	#	Name	Class
DB	14	Reece Turner	Fr
DB	15	Brailon Raymond	Jr
DB	17	Skylar Husband	Jr
LB	19	Cale Daigle	So
DB	20	Lynard Harris	Jr
LB	20	Carsen Hebert	So
DB	21	Jhamal Shelby Jr.	Sr
DB	22	Zavian Dilworth	Sr
DB	23	Gavin Duplechin	So
DB	24	Braylon Noel	So
DL	25	Alec Haynes	So
DB	26	Gregory Harding Jr.	So
DB	27	Gary Bailey Jr.	Fr
DB	28	Marcus Dawson	Fr
DB	29	Greg Jackson Jr.	Sr
DB	30	Kristian Dillard	Jr
LB	30	Taylor Thibodaux	Fr
LB	31	Mace Melancon	So
DB	32	Jeremie Elzy	So
DB	33	Shermar Carter	Jr
DB	34	Travin Moore	Jr
DB	36	Justin Helper	Jr
DB	37	Kasai Jones	Jr
LB	38	Kennon Loftin	Sr
LB	41	Dominic Logiudice	Jr
DB	42	Peyton Depolitte	So
LB	43	Trent Santos	Fr
LB	44	EJ Segrest	Jr
DL	45	Alex Villavaso	Sr
DB	46	Lawrence Bangura	So
LB	47	Kevin Martin	Fr
DB	48	Chase Morales	Fr
DL	50	Romeo Brown	Fr
LB	52	Andrew Cavalier	Jr
DL	53	Lionel Williams	Jr
DL	57	Jamaal Sapp	Jr
LB	58	Arrington Adams	Fr
DL	90	Aidan Clements	Jr
DL	91	Chase Chesser	So
DL	92	Fred Dampeer	Jr
DL	93	Talan Bingham	Fr
DL	94	Griffin Ellis	So
DL	95	Shay Collins	So
DL	96	Grant Merritt	Fr
DL	97	Jordan Okelo-Johnson	Fr
DL	98	Dale Smith	Fr
DL	99	Joey Lightfoot	Jr
DB		Cameron Allen	Fr
DB		Draylon August	Fr
DB		Prystyn Cambre	Fr
LB		Charlie Diedrich	Fr
LB		Damari Drake	Fr
DB		Kristopher Griffin	Fr
DL		Logan Jackson	Fr
DB		Erin Moore	Fr
DL		Scott Smith	Fr

Special teams

Pos.	#	Name	Class
P	16	Pharrell Harewood	So
K, P	25	Zachry Sugandi-Truitt	So
K	27	Sean Hebert	So
LS	49	Josh Bellanger	Jr
K, P	98	Ashton Guilbeau	Jr
K	99	Wyatt Guidry	Sr

Head coach

- Tommy Rybacki (Jacksonville State)

Coordinators/assistant coaches

- Darion Monroe (Tulane)
  Defensive coordinator/secondary
- Matt Giampa (Temple)
  Offensive coordinator/qb
- Collin Guggenheim (Nicholls State)
  Special teams coordinator/running backs
- Seth Price (Arkansas State)
  Offensive line/run game coordinator
- Joe Lombardi (Louisiana)
  Tight ends
- Dontez Byrd (Tennessee Tech)
  Wide receivers
- Mike Jenkins (Arkansas–Monticello)
  Defensive tackles
- Webb Hamilton (Mississippi State)
  Edges
- Quinton Sharkey (Nicholls State)
  Defensive analyst/linebackers
- Corey Cotton Jr. (Nicholls State)
  Student assistant defense
- Nathan Hebb (Nicholls State)
  Offensive analyst/quarterbacks
- Grant Betts (Troy)
  Offensive analyst/offensive line

Legend

- (C) Team captain
- (S) Suspended
- (I) Ineligible
- Injured
- Redshirt

Roster
