= 2026 East Texas A&M Lions football team =

American college football season

2026 East Texas A&M Lions football
- Conference: Southland Conference
- Record: 3–9 (3–6 SLC)
- Head coach: Clint Dolezel (4th season)
- Offensive scheme: Spread
- Defensive coordinator: Jesse Thompson (1st season)
- Base defense: Multiple 4–2–5
- Home stadium: Ernest Hawkins Field at Memorial Stadium

2026 Southland Conference football standings
	Conf.			Overall
Team	W		L	W		L
No. 4 Lamar +^	8	–	1	10	–	2
No. 5 Stephen F. Austin +	8	–	1	11	–	1
No. 21 Incarnate Word	7	–	2	8	–	4
UT Rio Grande Valley	4	–	5	6	–	6
Southeastern Louisiana	4	–	5	6	–	6
Houston Christian	4	–	5	5	–	7
McNeese	4	–	5	5	–	7
Nicholls	3	–	6	4	–	8
East Texas A&M	3	–	6	3	–	9
Northwestern State	0	–	9	0	–	12
+ – Conference co-champions; ^ – FCS playoff participant; As of November 22, 2026; Rankings from STATS Poll

The 2026 East Texas A&M Lions football team will represent East Texas A&M University as a member of the Southland Conference (SLC) during the 2026 NCAA Division I FCS football season. The Lions will be led by fourth-year head coach Clint Dolezel and will play their home games at Ernest Hawkins Field at Memorial Stadium in Commerce, Texas.

== Schedule ==
Date	Time	Opponent	Site	TV	Result	Attendance
August 29	6:00 p.m.	at No. 21 Mercer*	Five Star Stadium; Macon, GA (FCS Kickoff)	ESPN	L 15–23	8,378
September 5	7:00 p.m.	at No. 13 Stephen F. Austin	Homer Bryce Stadium; Nacogdoches, TX	ESPN+	L 7–44	6,772
September 12	6:00 p.m.	Northwestern State	Ernest Hawkins Field at Memorial Stadium; Commerce, TX	ESPN+	W 38–14	3,031
September 19	7:00 p.m.	at Tulsa*	Skelly Field at H. A. Chapman Stadium; Tulsa, OK	ESPN+	L 0–42	16,288
September 26	6:00 p.m.	at McNeese	Navarre Stadium; Lake Charles, LA	ESPN+	L 24–27	8,580
October 3	6:00 p.m.	UT Rio Grande Valley^{†}	Ernest Hawkins Field at Memorial Stadium; Commerce, TX	ESPN+	W 20–17	2,733
October 17	6:00 p.m.	at Houston Christian	Husky Stadium; Houston, TX	ESPN+	L 24–43	1,280
October 24	6:00 p.m.	Prairie View A&M*	Ernest Hawkins Field at Memorial Stadium; Commerce, TX	ESPN+	L 19–30	2,685
October 31	3:00 p.m.	Southeastern Louisiana	Ernest Hawkins Field at Memorial Stadium; Commerce, TX	ESPN+	W 10–7	1,731
November 7	3:00 p.m.	at Nicholls	Manning Field at John L. Guidry Stadium; Thibodaux, LA	ESPN+	L 31–32	8,955
November 14	3:00 PM	at No. 7т Lamar	Provost Umphrey Stadium; Beaumont, TX	ESPN+	L 26–45	8,133
November 21	3:00 p.m.	No. 21 Incarnate Word	Ernest Hawkins Field at Memorial Stadium; Commerce, TX	ESPN+	L 3–66	2,247
*Non-conference game; ^{†}Homecoming; Rankings from STATS Poll released prior to the game; All times are in Central time

== Game summaries ==
=== at No. 21 Mercer ===
East Texas A&M Lions (0–0) at No. 21 Mercer Bears (0–0) – Game summary

Quarter	1	2	3	4	Total
Lions	0	0	7	8	15
No. 21 Bears	10	13	0	0	23

at Five Star Stadium • Macon, GA

- Date: August 29
- Game time: 6:00 p.m.
- Game weather: Cloudy • Temperature: 83 °F (28 °C) • Wind: SE at 5 miles per hour (8.0 km/h)
- Game attendance: 8,378
- Referee: Bruce Austin
- TV announcers (ESPN): Clay Matvick, Rocky Boiman and Laura Stickells

Game information

First quarter

- MER – Simon Zeidan 55-yard field goal, 6:45. Bears 3–0. Drive: 11 plays, 43 yards, 5:42.
- MER – Jackson Kostmayer 12-yard pass from Jaylen King (Simon Zeidan kick), 3:04. Bears 10–0. Drive: 4 plays, 76 yards, 1:10.

Second quarter

- MER – Simon Zeidan 21-yard field goal, 5:20. Bears 13–0. Drive: 7 plays, 65 yards, 3:11.
- MER – Simon Zeidan 33-yard field goal, 0:30. Bears 16–0. Drive: 12 plays, 62 yards, 3:50.
- MER – Cameron Goggins 38-yard interception return (Simon Zeidan kick), 0:15. Bears 23–0.

Third quarter

- ETAM – Micah Simpson 48-yard pass from Eric Rodriguez (Ozlo Rigby kick), 6:47. Bears 23–7. Drive: 4 plays, 56 yards, 2:01.

Fourth quarter

- ETAM – Quay Middlebrooks 1-yard run (Eric Rodriguez run), 11:10. Bears 23–15. Drive: 13 plays, 80 yards, 6:56.

Statistics	ETAM	MER
First downs	15	16
Total yards	70–383	64–352
Rushing yards	39–151	36–175
Passing yards	232	177
Passing: Comp–Att–Int	15–31–3	15–28–0
Turnovers	3	0
Time of possession	30:14	29:46

Team	Category	Player	Statistics
East Texas A&M	Passing	Eric Rodriguez	15/31, 232 yards, TD, 3 INT
East Texas A&M	Rushing	EJ Oakmon	14 carries, 87 yards
East Texas A&M	Receiving	Micah Simpson	9 receptions, 165 yards, TD
Mercer	Passing	Jaylen King	15/28, 177 yards, TD
Mercer	Rushing	Zahmari Palode-Gary	8 carries, 87 yards
Mercer	Receiving	Brayden Smith	9 receptions, 131 yards

=== at No. 13 Stephen F. Austin ===
East Texas A&M Lions (0–1) at No. 13 Stephen F. Austin Lumberjacks (1–0) – Game summary

Quarter	1	2	3	4	Total
Lions	7	0	0	0	7
No. 13 Lumberjacks	7	17	7	13	44

at Homer Bryce Stadium • Nacogdoches, Texas

- Date: September 5
- Game time: 7:00 p.m.
- Game weather: Cloudy • Temperature: 82 °F (28 °C) • Wind: S 5 mph
- Game attendance: 6,772
- Referee: Matt Beck
- TV: ESPN+

Game information

First quarter

- SFA – JT Kitna 1-yard run (Carlos Alvarado kick), 4:50. Lumberjacks 7–0. Drive: 12 plays, 65 yards, 5:54.
- ETAM – Andrez Lewis 21-yard pass from Eric Rodriguez (Ozlo Rigby kick), 2:02. Tied 7–7. Drive: 6 plays, 83 yards, 2:42.

Second quarter

- SFA – Gavin Rutherford 11-yard run (Carlos Alvarado kick), 14:14. Lumberjacks 14–7. Drive: 7 plays, 47 yards, 2:39.
- SFA – Gavin Rutherford 4-yard run (Carlos Alvarado kick), 11:56. Lumberjacks 21–7. Drive: 3 plays, 58 yards, 1:20.
- SFA – Carlos Alvarado 23-yard field goal, 0:00. Lumberjacks 24–7. Drive: 4 plays, -3 yards, 1:18.

Third quarter

- SFA – Jaylen Jenkins 40-yard run (Carlos Alvarado kick), 10:56. Lumberjacks 31–7. Drive: 2 plays, 39 yards, 0:42.

Fourth quarter

- SFA – Carlos Alvarado 37-yard field goal, 11:44. Lumberjacks 34–7. Drive: 7 plays, 19 yards, 3:01.
- SFA – Carlos Alvarado 26-yard field goal, 5:35. Lumberjacks 37–7. Drive: 8 plays, 20 yards, 5:35.
- SFA – Cannon Lemberg 2-yard pass from Bryson Broadway (Carlos Alvarado kick), 1:01. Lumberjacks 44–7. Drive: 7 plays, 55 yards, 2:57.

Statistics	ETAM	SFA
First downs	12	25
Plays–yards	46–187	77–434
Rushes–yards	22–56	46–256
Passing yards	131	178
Passing: comp–att–int	13–24–3	22–31–0
Turnovers	4	1
Time of possession	20:32	39:28

Team	Category	Player	Statistics
East Texas A&M	Passing	Eric Rodriguez	9/16, 110 yards, TD, 2 INT
East Texas A&M	Rushing	Quay Middlebrooks	5 carries, 31 yards
East Texas A&M	Receiving	Micah Simpson	4 receptions, 58 yards
Stephen F. Austin	Passing	Gavin Rutherford	16/21, 140 yards
Stephen F. Austin	Rushing	Preston Alford	6 carries, 76 yards
Stephen F. Austin	Receiving	Clayton Wayland	4 receptions, 46 yards

=== Northwestern State ===
Northwestern State Demons (0–2) at East Texas A&M Lions (0–2) – Game summary

Quarter	1	2	3	4	Total
Demons	0	0	0	0	0
Lions	0	0	0	0	0

at Ernest Hawkins Field at Memorial Stadium • Commerce, Texas

- Date: September 12
- Game time: 6:00 p.m.

Game information

First quarter
Second quarter
Third quarter
Fourth quarter

Statistics	NWST	ETAM
First downs		
Plays–yards		
Rushes–yards		
Passing yards		
Passing: comp–att–int		
Turnovers		
Time of possession		

Team	Category	Player	Statistics
Northwestern State	Passing		
Northwestern State	Rushing		
Northwestern State	Receiving		
East Texas A&M	Passing		
East Texas A&M	Rushing		
East Texas A&M	Receiving		

=== at Tulsa (FBS) ===
East Texas A&M Lions (0–0) at Tulsa Golden Hurricane (0–0) – Game summary

Quarter	1	2	3	4	Total
Lions	0	0	0	0	0
Golden Hurricane (FBS)	0	0	0	0	0

at Skelly Field at H. A. Chapman Stadium • Tulsa, Oklahoma

- Date: September 19
- Game time: 7:00 p.m.

Game information

First quarter
Second quarter
Third quarter
Fourth quarter

Statistics	ETAM	TLSA
First downs		
Plays–yards		
Rushes–yards		
Passing yards		
Passing: comp–att–int		
Turnovers		
Time of possession		

Team	Category	Player	Statistics
East Texas A&M	Passing		
East Texas A&M	Rushing		
East Texas A&M	Receiving		
Tulsa	Passing		
Tulsa	Rushing		
Tulsa	Receiving		

=== at McNeese ===
East Texas A&M Lions (1–3) at McNeese Cowboys (1–3) – Game summary

Quarter	1	2	3	4	Total
Lions	0	0	0	0	0
Cowboys	0	0	0	0	0

at Navarre Stadium • Lake Charles, Louisiana

- Date: September 26
- Game time: 6:00 p.m.
- TV: ESPN+

Game information

First quarter
Second quarter
Third quarter
Fourth quarter

Statistics	ETAM	MCN
First downs		
Plays–yards		
Rushes–yards		
Passing yards		
Passing: comp–att–int		
Turnovers		
Time of possession		

Team	Category	Player	Statistics
East Texas A&M	Passing		
East Texas A&M	Rushing		
East Texas A&M	Receiving		
McNeese	Passing		
McNeese	Rushing		
McNeese	Receiving		

=== UT Rio Grande Valley ===
UT Rio Grande Valley Vaqueros (2–2) at East Texas A&M Lions (1–4) – Game summary

Quarter	1	2	3	4	Total
Vaqueros	0	0	0	0	0
Lions	0	0	0	0	0

at Ernest Hawkins Field at Memorial Stadium • Commerce, Texas

- Date: October 3
- Game time: 6:00 p.m.
- TV: ESPN+

Game information

First quarter
Second quarter
Third quarter
Fourth quarter

Statistics	RGV	ETAM
First downs		
Plays–yards		
Rushes–yards		
Passing yards		
Passing: comp–att–int		
Turnovers		
Time of possession		

Team	Category	Player	Statistics
UT Rio Grande Valley	Passing		
UT Rio Grande Valley	Rushing		
UT Rio Grande Valley	Receiving		
East Texas A&M	Passing		
East Texas A&M	Rushing		
East Texas A&M	Receiving		

=== at Houston Christian ===
East Texas A&M Lions (2–4) at Houston Christian Huskies (3–3) – Game summary

Quarter	1	2	3	4	Total
Lions	0	0	0	0	0
Huskies	0	0	0	0	0

at Husky Stadium • Houston, Texas

- Date: October 17
- Game time: 6:00 p.m.

Game information

First quarter
Second quarter
Third quarter
Fourth quarter

Statistics	ETAM	HCU
First downs		
Plays–yards		
Rushes–yards		
Passing yards		
Passing: comp–att–int		
Turnovers		
Time of possession		

Team	Category	Player	Statistics
East Texas A&M	Passing		
East Texas A&M	Rushing		
East Texas A&M	Receiving		
Houston Christian	Passing		
Houston Christian	Rushing		
Houston Christian	Receiving		

=== Prairie View A&M ===
Prairie View A&M Panthers (3–5) at East Texas A&M Lions (2–5) – Game summary

Quarter	1	2	3	4	Total
Panthers	0	0	0	0	0
Lions	0	0	0	0	0

at Ernest Hawkins Field at Memorial Stadium • Commerce, Texas

- Date: October 24
- Game time: 6:00 p.m.

Game information

First quarter
Second quarter
Third quarter
Fourth quarter

Statistics	PV	ETAM
First downs		
Plays–yards		
Rushes–yards		
Passing yards		
Passing: comp–att–int		
Turnovers		
Time of possession		

Team	Category	Player	Statistics
Prairie View A&M	Passing		
Prairie View A&M	Rushing		
Prairie View A&M	Receiving		
East Texas A&M	Passing		
East Texas A&M	Rushing		
East Texas A&M	Receiving		

=== Southeastern Louisiana ===
Southeastern Louisiana Lions (4–4) at East Texas A&M Lions (2–6) – Game summary

Quarter	1	2	3	4	Total
Southeastern Louisiana	0	0	0	0	0
East Texas A&M	0	0	0	0	0

at Ernest Hawkins Field at Memorial Stadium • Commerce, Texas

- Date: October 31
- Game time: 3:00 p.m.

Game information

First quarter
Second quarter
Third quarter
Fourth quarter

Statistics	SELA	ETAM
First downs		
Plays–yards		
Rushes–yards		
Passing yards		
Passing: comp–att–int		
Turnovers		
Time of possession		

Team	Category	Player	Statistics
Southeastern Louisiana	Passing		
Southeastern Louisiana	Rushing		
Southeastern Louisiana	Receiving		
East Texas A&M	Passing		
East Texas A&M	Rushing		
East Texas A&M	Receiving		

=== at Nicholls ===
East Texas A&M Lions (3–6) at Nicholls Colonels (3–6) – Game summary

Quarter	1	2	3	4	Total
Lions	0	0	0	0	0
Colonels	0	0	0	0	0

at Manning Field at John L. Guidry Stadium • Thibodaux, Louisiana

- Date: November 7
- Game time: 3:00 p.m.

Game information

First quarter
Second quarter
Third quarter
Fourth quarter

Statistics	ETAM	NICH
First downs		
Plays–yards		
Rushes–yards		
Passing yards		
Passing: comp–att–int		
Turnovers		
Time of possession		

Team	Category	Player	Statistics
East Texas A&M	Passing		
East Texas A&M	Rushing		
East Texas A&M	Receiving		
Nicholls	Passing		
Nicholls	Rushing		
Nicholls	Receiving		

=== at No. 7т Lamar ===
East Texas A&M Lions (3–7) at No. 7т Lamar Cardinals (8–2) – Game summary

Quarter	1	2	3	4	Total
Lions	0	0	0	0	0
No. 7т Cardinals	0	0	0	0	0

at Provost Umphrey Stadium • Beaumont, Texas

- Date: November 14

Game information

First quarter
Second quarter
Third quarter
Fourth quarter

Statistics	ETAM	LAM
First downs		
Plays–yards		
Rushes–yards		
Passing yards		
Passing: comp–att–int		
Turnovers		
Time of possession		

Team	Category	Player	Statistics
East Texas A&M	Passing		
East Texas A&M	Rushing		
East Texas A&M	Receiving		
Lamar	Passing		
Lamar	Rushing		
Lamar	Receiving		

=== No. 21 Incarnate Word ===
No. 21 Incarnate Word Cardinals (7–4) at East Texas A&M Lions (3–8) – Game summary

Quarter	1	2	3	4	Total
No. 21 Cardinals	0	0	0	0	0
Lions	0	0	0	0	0

at Ernest Hawkins Field at Memorial Stadium • Commerce, Texas

- Date: November 21
- Game time: 3:00 p.m.

Game information

First quarter
Second quarter
Third quarter
Fourth quarter

Statistics	UIW	ETAM
First downs		
Plays–yards		
Rushes–yards		
Passing yards		
Passing: comp–att–int		
Turnovers		
Time of possession		

Team	Category	Player	Statistics
Incarnate Word	Passing		
Incarnate Word	Rushing		
Incarnate Word	Receiving		
East Texas A&M	Passing		
East Texas A&M	Rushing		
East Texas A&M	Receiving		
