= 2026 Houston Christian Huskies football team =

American college football season

2026 Houston Christian Huskies football
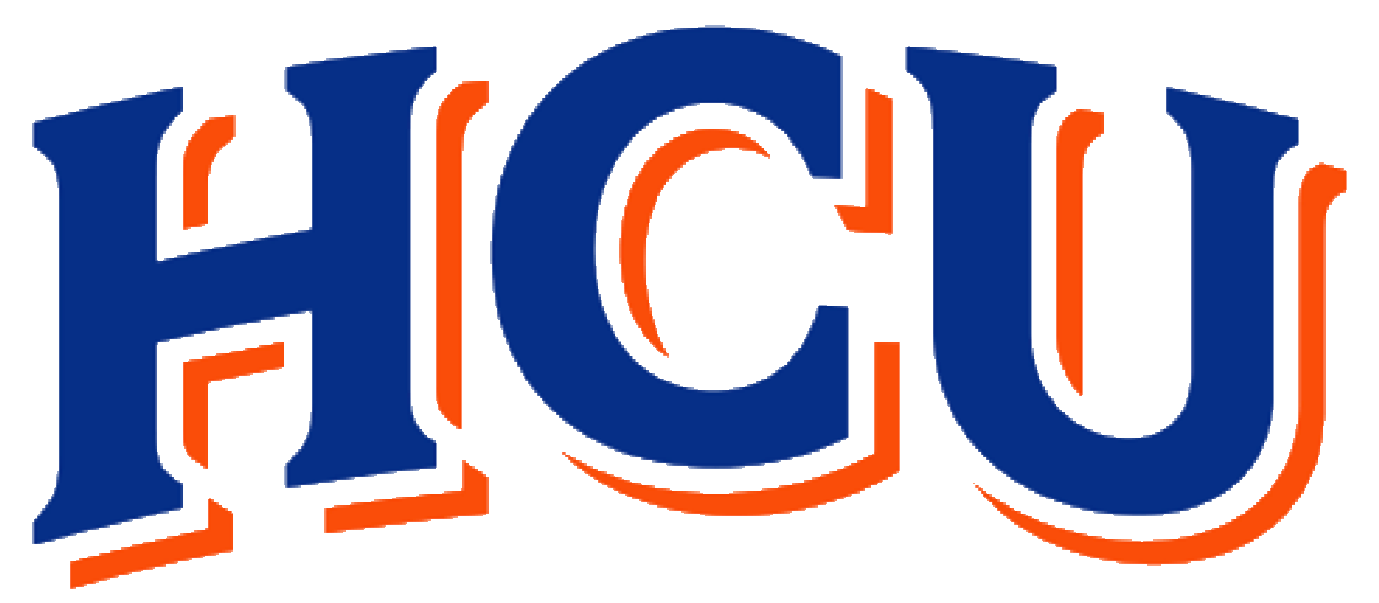
- Conference: Southland Conference
- Record: 5–7 (4–5 SLC)
- Head coach: Jason Bachtel (3rd season)
- Offensive scheme: Pro spread
- Defensive coordinator: Zach Wilkerson (3rd season)
- Base defense: 3–4
- Home stadium: Husky Stadium

2026 Southland Conference football standings
	Conf.			Overall
Team	W		L	W		L
No. 4 Lamar +^	8	–	1	10	–	2
No. 5 Stephen F. Austin +	8	–	1	11	–	1
No. 21 Incarnate Word	7	–	2	8	–	4
UT Rio Grande Valley	4	–	5	6	–	6
Southeastern Louisiana	4	–	5	6	–	6
Houston Christian	4	–	5	5	–	7
McNeese	4	–	5	5	–	7
Nicholls	3	–	6	4	–	8
East Texas A&M	3	–	6	3	–	9
Northwestern State	0	–	9	0	–	12
+ – Conference co-champions; ^ – FCS playoff participant; As of November 22, 2026; Rankings from STATS Poll

The 2026 Houston Christian Huskies football team represents Houston Christian University as a member of the Southland Conference (SLC) during the 2026 NCAA Division I FCS football season. The Huskies are led by third-year head coach Jason Bachtel and play their home games at Husky Stadium in Houston, Texas.

== Schedule ==
Date	Time	Opponent	Site	TV	Result	Attendance
August 27	6:00 p.m.	at No. 19 Southeastern Louisiana	Strawberry Stadium; Hammond, LA	ESPN+	W 34–28	4,199
September 5	6:00 p.m.	at Rice*	Rice Stadium; Houston, TX	ESPN+	L 3–31	15,128
September 12	6:00 p.m.	Arkansas Baptist*	Husky Stadium; Houston, TX	ESPN+	W 88–0	1,271
September 19	6:00 p.m.	at Incarnate Word	Gayle and Tom Benson Stadium; San Antonio, TX	ESPN+	L 23–30 ^{OT}	2,626
September 26	6:30 p.m.	at North Texas*	DATCU Stadium; Denton, TX	ESPN+	L 14–63	21,718
October 3	6:00 p.m.	Nicholls	Husky Stadium; Houston, TX	ESPN+	W 16–2	1,696
October 17	6:00 p.m.	East Texas A&M	Husky Stadium; Houston, TX	ESPN+	W 43–24	1,280
October 24	3:00 p.m.	at No. 16 Lamar	Provost Umphrey Stadium; Beaumont, TX	ESPN+	L 10–35	8,190
October 31	2:00 p.m.	at No. 2 Stephen F. Austin	Homer Bryce Stadium; Nacogdoches, TX	ESPN+	L 6–37	5,763
November 7	4:00 p.m.	McNeese^{†}	Husky Stadium; Houston, TX	ESPN+	L 0–10	1,504
November 14	1:00 p.m.	at Northwestern State	Harry Turpin Stadium; Natchitoches, LA	ESPN+	W 28–21	1,013
November 21	4:00 p.m.	UT Rio Grande Valley	Husky Stadium; Houston, TX	ESPN+	L 14–26	1,658
*Non-conference game; ^{†}Homecoming; Rankings from STATS Poll released prior to the game; All times are in Central time

== Game summaries ==
=== at No. 19 Southeastern Louisiana ===
Houston Christian Huskies (0–0) at No. 19 Southeastern Louisiana Lions (0–0)

Quarter	1	2	3	4	Total
Huskies	0	17	14	3	34
No. 19 Lions	7	0	7	14	28

at Strawberry Stadium • Hammond, Louisiana

- Date: August 27
- Game time: 6:00 p.m. CDT
- Game weather: Sunny • Temperature: 83 °F (28 °C) • Wind: NW at 2 miles per hour (3.2 km/h)
- Game attendance: 4,199
- Referee: James Brookhart
- TV announcers (ESPN+): Logan Loving, Chase Gispert and Sophia Daniels

Game information

First quarter

- SELA – Calvin Smith Jr. 10-yard run (Drew Talley kick), 0:09. Lions 7–0. Drive: 12 plays, 73 yards, 6:03.

Second quarter

- HCU – Lukasz Smolen 30-yard field goal, 10:43. Lions 7–3. Drive: 5 plays, 22 yards, 2:15.
- HCU – Champ Dozier 4-yard run (Lukasz Smolen kick), 4:42. Huskies 10–7. Drive: 6 plays, 69 yards, 2:31.
- HCU – Keith Wheeler 12-yard pass from Cutter Stewart (Lukasz Smolen kick), 0:02. Huskies 17–7. Drive: 7 plays, 56 yards, 2:05.

Third quarter

- HCU – Jaylen Middleton 1-yard run (Lukasz Smolen kick), 8:24. Huskies 24–7. Drive: 15 plays, 70 yards, 6:31.
- SELA – Kyle Lowe 55-yard run (Drew Talley kick), 6:41. Huskies 24–14. Drive: 5 plays, 69 yards, 1:35.
- HCU – Jamaal Hall II 66-yard pass from Cutter Stewart (Lukasz Smolen kick), 1:55. Huskies 31–14. Drive: 1 play, 66 yards, 0:11.

Fourth quarter

- HCU – Lukasz Smolen 32-yard field goal, 14:20. Huskies 34–14. Drive: 7 plays, 26 yards, 1:51.
- SELA – Lawson Dixon 2-yard pass from Kyle Lowe (Drew Talley kick), 8:35. Huskies 34–21. Drive: 14 plays, 54 yards, 5:40.
- SELA – Lawson Dixon 18-yard pass from Kyle Lowe (Drew Talley kick), 3:29. Huskies 34–28. Drive: 7 plays, 51 yards, 1:17.

Statistics	HCU	SELA
First downs	17	23
Total yards	60–361	78–398
Rushing yards	41–161	51–248
Passing yards	200	150
Passing: comp–att–int	11–19–1	17–27–1
Turnovers	1	3
Time of possession	24:28	35:32

Team	Category	Player	Statistics
Houston Christian	Passing	Cutter Stewart	10/18, 173 yards, 2 TD, INT
Houston Christian	Rushing	Cutter Stewart	15 carries, 96 yards
Houston Christian	Receiving	Jamaal Hall II	2 receptions, 71 yards, TD
Southeastern Louisiana	Passing	Kyle Lowe	17/27, 150 yards, 2 TD, INT
Southeastern Louisiana	Rushing	Kyree Paul	8 carries, 70 yards
Southeastern Louisiana	Receiving	Lawson Dixon	4 receptions, 46 yards, 2 TD

=== at Rice (FBS) ===
Houston Christian Huskies (1–0) at Rice Owls (FBS) (0–0) – Game summary

Quarter	1	2	3	4	Total
Huskies	3	0	0	0	3
Owls (FBS)	7	10	0	14	31

at Rice Stadium • Houston, Texas

- Date: September 5
- Game time: 6:00 p.m.
- Game weather: Cloudy • Temperature: 87 °F (31 °C) • Wind: SE at 7 miles per hour (11 km/h)
- Game attendance: 15,128
- Referee: Austin Mezzacasa
- TV announcers (ESPN+): Chris Elliott and LaDarrin McLane

Game information

First quarter

- HCU – Lukasz Smolen 42-yard field goal, 9:24. Huskies 3–0. Drive: 9 plays, 24 yards, 1:47.
- RICE – D'Andre Hardeman Jr. 2-yard run (Enock Gota kick), 1:02. Owls 7–3. Drive: 15 plays, 71 yards, 8:18.

Second quarter

- RICE – Quinton Jackson 7-yard run (Enock Gota kick), 9:32. Owls 14–3. Drive: 10 plays, 53 yards, 4:34.
- RICE – Enock Gota 26-yard field goal, 2:31. Owls 17–3. Drive: 11 plays, 72 yards, 5:46.

Third quarter

- No scoring plays.

Fourth quarter

- RICE – Quinton Jackson 12-yard run (Enock Gota kick), 13:19. Owls 24–3. Drive: 11 plays, 60 yards, 5:54.
- RICE – Gael Ochoa 29-yard run (Enock Gota kick), 10:16. Owls 31–3. Drive: 3 plays, 44 yards, 1:06.

Statistics	HCU	RICE
First downs	13	27
Plays–yards	58–244	80–493
Rushes–yards	35–148	70–465
Passing yards	96	28
Passing: comp–att–int	8–23–1	4–10–0
Turnovers	1	0
Time of possession	20:28	39:32

Team	Category	Player	Statistics
Houston Christian	Passing	Cutter Stewart	6/17, 61 yards, INT
Houston Christian	Rushing	Champ Dozier	8 carries, 86 yards
Houston Christian	Receiving	Jamaal Hall II	2 receptions, 27 yards
Rice	Passing	Gael Ochoa	2/5, 17 yards
Rice	Rushing	Tyvonn Byars	16 carries, 104 yards
Rice	Receiving	Davis Lane	2 receptions, 11 yards

=== Arkansas Baptist (NAIA) ===
Arkansas Baptist Buffaloes (NAIA) (1–1) at Houston Christian Huskies (1–1) – Game summary

Quarter	1	2	3	4	Total
Buffaloes (NAIA)	0	0	0	0	0
Huskies	28	34	10	16	88

at Husky Stadium • Houston, Texas

- Date: September 12
- Game time: 6:00 p.m.
- Game weather: Sunny • Temperature: 86 °F (30 °C)
- Game attendance: 1,271
- Referee: Rex Rose
- TV: ESPN+

Game information

First quarter

- (14:43) HCU – Champ Dozier 89-yard kickoff return, Lukasz Smolen kick (Houston Christian 7–0)
- (8:05) HCU – Elijah Harris 21-yard run, Lukasz Smolen kick (Drive: 7 plays, 74 yards, 1:58; Houston Christian 14–0)
- (5:04) HCU – Ja'Ryan Wallace 17-yard pass from Cutter Stewart, Lukasz Smolen kick (Drive: 5 plays, 51 yards, 1:11; Houston Christian 21–0)

Second quarter

- (15:00) HCU – Jaylen Middleton 23-yard run, Lukasz Smolen kick (Drive: 2 plays, 23 yards, 13:02; Houston Christian 28–0)
- (13:54) HCU – Jamaal Hall II 76-yard pass from Cutter Stewart (Drive: 1 play, 76 yards, 0:18; Houston Christian 34–0)
- (13:39) HCU – Champ Dozier 22-yard pass from Cutter Stewart, Lukasz Smolen kick (Drive: 1 play, 22 yards, 0:06; Houston Christian 41–0)
- (12:20) HCU – Elijah Harris 52-yard punt return, Lukasz Smolen kick (Houston Christian 48–0)
- (8:45) HCU – Ja'Ryan Wallace 29-yard pass from Reilly Garcia, Lukasz Smolen kick (Drive: 3 plays, 54 yards, 1:29; Houston Christian 55–0)
- (2:28) HCU – Jaylen Middleton 4-yard run, Lukasz Smolen kick (Drive: 7 plays, 75 yards, 3:17; Houston Christian 62–0)

Third quarter

- (11:18) HCU – Lukasz Smolen 22-yard field goal (Drive: 7 plays, 11 yards, 2:12; Houston Christian 65–0)
- (2:39) HCU – Hayden Drinkard 47-yard run, Lukasz Smolen kick (Drive: 3 plays, 66 yards, 0:56; Houston Christian 72–0)

Fourth quarter

- (10:44) HCU – Hayden Drinkard 8-yard run, Lukasz Smolen kick (Drive: 5 plays, 41 yards, 1:53; Houston Christian 79–0)
- (10:30) HCU – 0-yard safety (Houston Christian 81–0)
- (6:38) HCU – Hayden Drinkard 16-yard run, Lukasz Smolen kick (Drive: 6 plays, 48 yards, 3:40; Houston Christian 88–0)

Statistics	ARKB	HCU
First downs	11	24
Plays–yards	66–106	56–510
Rushes–yards	43–7	39–275
Passing yards	99	235
Passing: comp–att–int	12–23–0	9–17–0
Turnovers	2	0
Time of possession	34:29	10:31

Team	Category	Player	Statistics
Arkansas Baptist	Passing	Charles Coney	6/14, 70 yards
Arkansas Baptist	Rushing	Daryll Searcy Jr.	9 carries, 45 yards
Arkansas Baptist	Receiving	Daryll Searcy Jr.	2 receptions, 32 yards
Houston Christian	Passing	Cutter Stewart	5/10, 156 yards, 3 TD
Houston Christian	Rushing	Hayden Drinkard	12 carries, 98 yards, 3 TD
Houston Christian	Receiving	Jamaal Hall II	3 receptions, 117 yards, TD

=== at Incarnate Word ===
Houston Christian Huskies (2–1) at Incarnate Word Cardinals (1–1) – Game summary

Quarter	1	2	3	4	Total
Huskies	0	0	0	0	0
Cardinals	0	0	0	0	0

at Gayle and Tom Benson Stadium • San Antonio, Texas

- Date: September 19
- Game time: 6:00 p.m.
- TV: ESPN+

Game information

First quarter
Second quarter
Third quarter
Fourth quarter

Statistics	HCU	UIW
First downs		
Plays–yards		
Rushes–yards		
Passing yards		
Passing: comp–att–int		
Turnovers		
Time of possession		

Team	Category	Player	Statistics
Houston Christian	Passing		
Houston Christian	Rushing		
Houston Christian	Receiving		
Incarnate Word	Passing		
Incarnate Word	Rushing		
Incarnate Word	Receiving		

=== at North Texas (FBS) ===
Houston Christian Huskies (2–2) at North Texas Mean Green (FBS) (1–2) – Game summary

Quarter	1	2	3	4	Total
Huskies	0	0	0	0	0
Mean Green (FBS)	0	0	0	0	0

at DATCU Stadium • Denton, Texas

- Date: September 26
- Game time: 6:30 p.m.
- TV announcers (ESPN+): Will Conerly and LaDarrin McLane

Game information

First quarter
Second quarter
Third quarter
Fourth quarter

Statistics	HCU	UNT
First downs		
Plays–yards		
Rushes–yards		
Passing yards		
Passing: comp–att–int		
Turnovers		
Time of possession		

Team	Category	Player	Statistics
Houston Christian	Passing		
Houston Christian	Rushing		
Houston Christian	Receiving		
North Texas	Passing		
North Texas	Rushing		
North Texas	Receiving		

=== Nicholls ===
Nicholls Colonels (2–3) at Houston Christian Huskies (2–3) – Game summary

Quarter	1	2	3	4	Total
Colonels	0	0	0	0	0
Huskies	0	0	0	0	0

at Husky Stadium • Houston, Texas

- Date: October 3
- Game time: 6:00 p.m.
- TV: ESPN+

Game information

First quarter
Second quarter
Third quarter
Fourth quarter

Statistics	NICH	HCU
First downs		
Plays–yards		
Rushes–yards		
Passing yards		
Passing: comp–att–int		
Turnovers		
Time of possession		

Team	Category	Player	Statistics
Nicholls	Passing		
Nicholls	Rushing		
Nicholls	Receiving		
Houston Christian	Passing		
Houston Christian	Rushing		
Houston Christian	Receiving		

=== East Texas A&M ===
East Texas A&M Lions (2–4) at Houston Christian Huskies (3–3) – Game summary

Quarter	1	2	3	4	Total
Lions	0	0	0	0	0
Huskies	0	0	0	0	0

at Husky Stadium • Houston, Texas

- Date: October 17
- Game time: 6:00 p.m.

Game information

First quarter
Second quarter
Third quarter
Fourth quarter

Statistics	ETAM	HCU
First downs		
Plays–yards		
Rushes–yards		
Passing yards		
Passing: comp–att–int		
Turnovers		
Time of possession		

Team	Category	Player	Statistics
East Texas A&M	Passing		
East Texas A&M	Rushing		
East Texas A&M	Receiving		
Houston Christian	Passing		
Houston Christian	Rushing		
Houston Christian	Receiving		

=== at No. 16 Lamar ===
Houston Christian Huskies (4–3) at No. 16 Lamar Cardinals (5–2) – Game summary

Quarter	1	2	3	4	Total
Huskies	0	0	0	0	0
No. 16 Cardinals	0	0	0	0	0

at Provost Umphrey Stadium • Beaumont, Texas

- Date: October 24
- Game time: 3:00 p.m.

Game information

First quarter
Second quarter
Third quarter
Fourth quarter

Statistics	HCU	LAM
First downs		
Plays–yards		
Rushes–yards		
Passing yards		
Passing: comp–att–int		
Turnovers		
Time of possession		

Team	Category	Player	Statistics
Houston Christian	Passing		
Houston Christian	Rushing		
Houston Christian	Receiving		
Lamar	Passing		
Lamar	Rushing		
Lamar	Receiving		

=== at No. 2 Stephen F. Austin ===
Houston Christian Huskies (4–4) at No. 2 Stephen F. Austin Lumberjacks (8–0) – Game summary

Quarter	1	2	3	4	Total
Huskies	0	0	0	0	0
No. 2 Lumberjacks	0	0	0	0	0

at Homer Bryce Stadium • Nacogdoches, Texas

- Date: October 31
- Game time: 2:00 p.m.

Game information

First quarter
Second quarter
Third quarter
Fourth quarter

Statistics	HCU	SFA
First downs		
Plays–yards		
Rushes–yards		
Passing yards		
Passing: comp–att–int		
Turnovers		
Time of possession		

Team	Category	Player	Statistics
Houston Christian	Passing		
Houston Christian	Rushing		
Houston Christian	Receiving		
Stephen F. Austin	Passing		
Stephen F. Austin	Rushing		
Stephen F. Austin	Receiving		

=== McNeese ===
McNeese Cowboys (4–5) at Houston Christian Huskies (4–5) – Game summary

Quarter	1	2	3	4	Total
Cowboys	0	0	0	0	0
Huskies	0	0	0	0	0

at Husky Stadium • Houston, Texas

- Date: November 7
- Game time: 4:00 p.m.

Game information

First quarter
Second quarter
Third quarter
Fourth quarter

Statistics	MCN	HCU
First downs		
Plays–yards		
Rushes–yards		
Passing yards		
Passing: comp–att–int		
Turnovers		
Time of possession		

Team	Category	Player	Statistics
McNeese	Passing		
McNeese	Rushing		
McNeese	Receiving		
Houston Christian	Passing		
Houston Christian	Rushing		
Houston Christian	Receiving		

=== at Northwestern State ===
Houston Christian Huskies (4–6) at Northwestern State Demons (0–10) – Game summary

Quarter	1	2	3	4	Total
Huskies	0	0	0	0	0
Demons	0	0	0	0	0

at Harry Turpin Stadium • Natchitoches, Louisiana

- Date: November 14
- Game time: 1:00 p.m.

Game information

First quarter
Second quarter
Third quarter
Fourth quarter

Statistics	HCU	NWST
First downs		
Plays–yards		
Rushes–yards		
Passing yards		
Passing: comp–att–int		
Turnovers		
Time of possession		

Team	Category	Player	Statistics
Houston Christian	Passing		
Houston Christian	Rushing		
Houston Christian	Receiving		
Northwestern State	Passing		
Northwestern State	Rushing		
Northwestern State	Receiving		

=== UT Rio Grande Valley ===
UT Rio Grande Valley Vaqueros (5–6) at Houston Christian Huskies (5–6) – Game summary

Quarter	1	2	3	4	Total
Vaqueros	0	0	0	0	0
Huskies	0	0	0	0	0

at Husky Stadium • Houston, Texas

- Date: November 21
- Game time: 4:00 p.m.

Game information

First quarter
Second quarter
Third quarter
Fourth quarter

Statistics	RGV	HCU
First downs		
Plays–yards		
Rushes–yards		
Passing yards		
Passing: comp–att–int		
Turnovers		
Time of possession		

Team	Category	Player	Statistics
UT Rio Grande Valley	Passing		
UT Rio Grande Valley	Rushing		
UT Rio Grande Valley	Receiving		
Houston Christian	Passing		
Houston Christian	Rushing		
Houston Christian	Receiving		

== Rankings ==
Ranking movements Legend: ██ Increase in ranking ██ Decrease in ranking — = Not ranked RV = Received votes
	Week														
Poll	Pre	1	2	3	4	5	6	7	8	9	10	11	12	13	Final
STATS	—	RV	RV	RV	RV										
Coaches	—	RV	—	RV	—										
