= FCS Kickoff =

Annual American college football game

- Stadium: Campus sites (2026–present)
- Location: Campus sites
- Previous stadiums: Campus sites (2014–2016); Cramton Bowl (2017–2025)
- Operated: 2014–present

Sponsors
- Guardian Credit Union (2017–2020)

2026 matchup
- East Texas A&M at Mercer (15–23)

The FCS Kickoff is an annual college football game played on the Saturday before the opening weekend of the college football season. The game showcases teams from the NCAA Division I Football Championship Subdivision (FCS). For the game's first three editions, it was played at campus sites; from 2017 to 2025, the game was played at a neutral site, the Cramton Bowl in Montgomery, Alabama. From 2026 on, the game is back to being played at campus sites. The game is televised nationally by ESPN.

== History ==
In February 2013, ESPN announced that the 2014 college football season would begin at its earliest point in 11 years with the creation of the "FCS Kickoff", an annual game which would showcase two top-level teams from the NCAA Division I Football Championship Subdivision. ESPN stated that during meetings with FCS conference commissioners there was an interest in creating a "tentpole type" event around FCS football and to showcase the quality and depth of FCS football to a national audience.

Under current NCAA rules, FCS teams are not allowed to play their first regular-season game until the Thursday preceding Labor Day. However, an exception to this rule has been carved out for nationally televised events (on either over-the-air or cable networks); teams may participate in such an event against an out-of-conference opponent on the Saturday or Sunday preceding the standard season start date. No more than one team from a conference can participate in such an event in a given season, and no team can appear in such a game in three consecutive seasons.

The 2017 edition marked several changes for the event. First, ESPN took ownership of the event through its ESPN Events division. The event was moved to a neutral site (the Cramton Bowl in Montgomery, Alabama); received a name sponsorship by Guardian Credit Union, a small Montgomery-based credit union; was co-branded as the Montgomery Kickoff Classic; and also took on Alabama FCS member Jacksonville State University as a partner for the 2017 and 2018 editions. As such, JSU participated in both editions of the event. With Jacksonville State barred from a third consecutive FCS Kickoff appearance by NCAA rule, ESPN chose another Alabama program, Samford, as the de facto home team for the 2019 edition.

The 2020 edition, which saw Central Arkansas defeat Austin Peay, was the first since ESPN took ownership of the event that did not feature an Alabama school.

The game would not be held in 2021 due to the COVID-19 pandemic. When the game returned in 2022, it would not be sponsored by Guardian Credit Union and would only be known as the FCS Kickoff.

2022 would feature Jacksonville State's third appearance in the Week 0 game as they took on the Stephen F. Austin Lumberjacks. The Gamecocks would win 42–17 as the game ended prematurely with 13:18 left in the 4th quarter due to weather.

The 2023 rendition would feature the Mercer Bears and the North Alabama Lions. The Bears would defeat the Lions 17–7. The game was also the second FCS Kickoff game to feature a weather delay as lightning would halt play for 76 minutes in the 3rd quarter.

The Lions would return in 2024 to face off against Southeast Missouri State. The Lions would once again fall as they were defeated by the Redhawks 37–15.

The 2025 edition was a matchup of UC Davis Aggies and Mercer Bears. The Aggies were leading 23–17 with 7:46 remaining in the fourth quarter before the first lightning strike hit. Due to rain and intermittent lightning that continued to move through Montgomery, the game was declared a no contest, with all statistics voided.

In 2026, the FCS Kickoff reverted to being played on college campuses after ten years at the Cramton Bowl.

== Game results ==
Season	Date	Winning team		Losing team		Venue	Attendance
2014	August 23	No. 1 Eastern Washington	56	No. 17 Sam Houston State	35	Roos Field (Cheney, WA)	10,310
2015	August 29	No. 13 Montana	38	No. 1 North Dakota State	35	Washington–Grizzly Stadium (Missoula, MT)	26,472
2016	August 27	No. 1 North Dakota State	24	No. 7 Charleston Southern	17	Fargodome (Fargo, ND)	18,881
2017	August 26	No. 6 Jacksonville State	27	No. 12 Chattanooga	13	Cramton Bowl (Montgomery, AL)	12,952
2018	August 25	No. 14 North Carolina A&T	20	No. 6 Jacksonville State	17	Cramton Bowl (Montgomery, AL)	13,500
2019	August 24	Youngstown State	45	Samford	22	Cramton Bowl (Montgomery, AL)	12,560
2020	August 29	No. 11 Central Arkansas	24	No. 13 Austin Peay	17	Cramton Bowl (Montgomery, AL)	2,000
2022	August 27	Jacksonville State	42	No. 10 Stephen F. Austin	17	Cramton Bowl (Montgomery, AL)	5,235
2023	August 26	No. 20 Mercer	17	North Alabama	7	Cramton Bowl (Montgomery, AL)	5,566
2024	August 24	Southeast Missouri State	37	North Alabama	15	Cramton Bowl (Montgomery, AL)	4,358
2025	Game declared a no contest due to lightning. No. 7 UC Davis vs No. 11 Mercer						
2026	August 29	No. 17 Mercer	23	East Texas A&M	15	Five Star Stadium (Macon, GA)	8,378

Rankings are from the STATS FCS Poll.

== Records ==
=== By team ===
Rank	Team	Apps	Record	Win %	PF	PA
1	Mercer	3 (Note: Includes this team's appearance in the 2025 game that was declared a no contest, with all statistics voided.)	2–0	1.000	40	22
1	Central Arkansas	1	1–0	1.000	24	17
1	Eastern Washington	1	1–0	1.000	56	35
1	Montana	1	1–0	1.000	38	35
1	North Carolina A&T	1	1–0	1.000	20	17
1	Southeast Missouri State	1	1–0	1.000	37	15
1	Youngstown State	1	1–0	1.000	45	22
7	Jacksonville State (Note: Now playing in Division I FBS.)	3	2–1	.667	86	50
8	North Dakota State	2	1–1	.500	59	55
9	UC Davis	1	0–0	–	–	–
10	Austin Peay	1	0–1	.000	17	24
10	Charleston Southern	1	0–1	.000	17	24
10	Chattanooga	1	0–1	.000	13	27
10	East Texas A&M	1	0–1	.000	15	23
10	North Alabama	2	0–2	.000	22	54
10	Sam Houston (Note: Sam Houston dropped "State" from its athletic branding in 2020.)	1	0–1	.000	35	56
10	Samford	1	0–1	.000	22	45
10	Stephen F. Austin	1	0–1	.000	17	42

=== By conference ===
Rank	Conference	Apps	Record	Win %	PF	PA
1	Big Sky	3 (Note: Includes this conference's appearance in the 2025 game that was declared a no contest, with all statistics voided.)	2–0	1.000	94	70
1	ASUN	1	1–0	1.000	42	17
1	MEAC	1	1–0	1.000	20	17
1	OVC–BSC	1	1–0	1.000	37	15
5	MVFC	3	2–1	.667	104	77
6	Southland	2	1–1	.500	59	73
7	Southern	4	1–2	.333	52	79
7	OVC	3	1–2	.333	61	57
9	Big South	1	0–1	.000	17	24
9	UAC	2	0–2	.000	22	54
9	WAC	1	0–1	.000	17	42
