= 2026 Alcorn State Braves football team =

American college football season

2026 Alcorn State Braves football
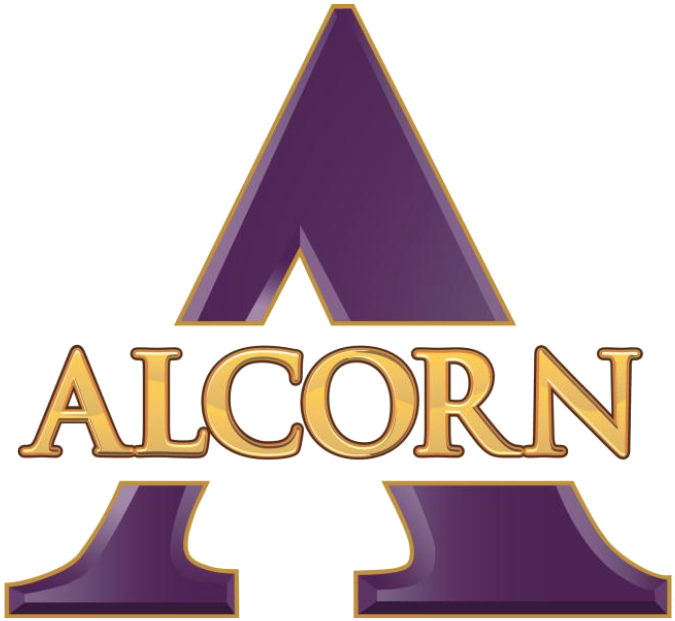
- Conference: Southwestern Athletic Conference
- West Division

Ranking
- BCFP: No. 5
- Record: 6–6 (4–4 SWAC)
- Head coach: Cedric Thomas (3rd season)
- Offensive coordinator: Jermaine Gales (3rd season)
- Defensive coordinator: Deion Roberson (3rd season)
- Home stadium: Casem-Spinks Stadium

2026 Southwestern Athletic Conference football standings
	Conf.			Overall
Team	W		L	W		L
East Division
Alabama A&M x	6	–	2	9	–	3
Jackson State	5	–	3	8	–	3
Alabama State	4	–	4	6	–	5
Florida A&M*	3	–	5	4	–	8
Bethune–Cookman	3	–	5	5	–	7
Mississippi Valley State*	2	–	6	3	–	9
West Division
Prairie View A&M x	6	–	2	7	–	5
Arkansas–Pine Bluff	5	–	3	7	–	4
Southern	4	–	3	6	–	5
Alcorn State	4	–	4	6	–	6
Grambling State	3	–	4	5	–	5
Texas Southern	2	–	6	3	–	8
Championship: December 5, 2026
$ – Conference champion; x – Division champion/co-champions; y – Championship game participant; * – Ineligible for FCS postseason play due to failed academic requirements; As of November 22, 2026; Rankings from STATS Poll

The 2026 Alcorn State Braves football team will represent Alcorn State University as a member of the Southwestern Athletic Conference (SWAC) during the 2026 NCAA Division I FCS football season. The Braves will be led by third-year head coach Cedric Thomas and will play their home games at Casem-Spinks Stadium in Lorman, Mississippi.

== Schedule ==
Date	Time	Opponent	Site	TV	Result	Attendance
August 29	6:00 p.m.	Miles*	Casem-Spinks Stadium; Lorman, MS	SWAC TV	W 56–7	3,117
September 5	4:00 p.m.	at Southern Miss*	M. M. Roberts Stadium; Hattiesburg, MS	ESPN+	L 3–49	26,246
September 12	6:00 p.m.	vs. Arkansas–Pine Bluff	Simmons Bank Liberty Stadium; Memphis, TN (Southern Heritage Classic)	HBCU GO	W 53–51 ^{2OT}	21,881
September 19	6:00 p.m.	at North Alabama*	Bank Independent Stadium; Florence, AL	ESPN+	L 20–38	11,830
September 26	3:00 p.m.	Texas Southern	Casem-Spinks Stadium; Lorman, MS	SWAC TV	W 43–40 ^{OT}	9,731
October 3	2:00 p.m.	at Grambling State	Eddie G. Robinson Memorial Stadium; Grambling, LA	SWAC TV	L 59–63	
October 10	2:00 p.m.	Arkansas Baptist*^{†}	Casem-Spinks Stadium; Lorman, MS	SWAC TV	W 63–7	14,502
October 17	2:00 p.m.	at Prairie View A&M	Panther Stadium; Prairie View, TX	HBCU GO	L 38–41	
October 31	2:00 p.m.	at Mississippi Valley State	Rice–Totten Stadium; Itta Bena, MS	SWAC TV	W 52–17	5,600
November 7	2:00 p.m.	Florida A&M	Casem-Spinks Stadium; Lorman, MS	SWAC TV	W 38–20	3,922
November 14	2:00 p.m.	at Southern	A. W. Mumford Stadium; Baton Rouge, LA	HBCU Go	L 28–41	18,122
November 21	2:00 p.m.	Jackson State	Casem-Spinks Stadium; Lorman, MS (Soul Bowl)	ESPN	L 40–54	22,179
*Non-conference game; ^{†}Homecoming; All times are in Central time

== Game summaries ==
=== Miles (DII) ===
Miles Golden Bears (0–0) at Alcorn State Braves (0–0) – Game summary

Quarter	1	2	3	4	Total
Golden Bears (DII)	7	0	0	0	7
Braves	7	28	14	7	56

at Casem-Spinks Stadium • Lorman, Mississippi

- Date: August 29
- Game time: 6:00 p.m.
- Game weather: Sunny, 90 °F (32 °C)
- Game attendance: 3,117
- Referee: Jarvis Waker
- TV announcers (SWAC TV): James Verrett and Charles Porter

Game information

First quarter

- ALCN – Jamarr Ebron 26-yard pass from Jaylon Tolbert (Kenyon Bowyer kick), 0:48. Braves 7–0. Drive: 5 plays, 45 yards, 1:37.
- MIL – Glen Williams 61-yard pass from Brinley Vandiver (Rourke Davis kick), 0:00. Tied 7–7. Drive: 2 plays, 65 yards, 0:42.

Second quarter

- ALCN – Jaylon Tolbert 1-yard run (Kenyon Bowyer kick), 9:10. Braves 14–7. Drive: 13 plays, 75 yards, 5:50.
- ALCN – Jaylen McCroy 77-yard blocked field goal return (Kenyon Bowyer kick), 3:36. Braves 21–7.
- ALCN – Jamarr Ebron 4-yard pass from Jaylon Tolbert (Kenyon Bowyer kick), 3:03. Braves 28–7. Drive: 2 plays, 12 yards, 0:24.
- ALCN – Nolan Chambers 16-yard pass from Jaylon Tolbert (Kenyon Bowyer kick), 0:46. Braves 35–7. Drive: 7 plays, 64 yards, 1:00.

Third quarter

- ALCN – Elijah Griffin 36-yard pass from Jaylon Tolbert (Kenyon Bowyer kick), 9:47. Braves 42–7. Drive: 6 plays, 55 yards, 2:36.
- ALCN – Tyree Kelly 17-yard pass from Jaylon Tolbert (Kenyon Bowyer kick), 4:07. Braves 49–7. Drive: 8 plays, 60 yards, 3:08.

Fourth quarter

- ALCN – Ernest Temple 22-yard pass from Bryan Wilson (Kenyon Bowyer kick), 12:32. Braves 56–7. Drive: 6 plays, 34 yards, 3:05.

Statistics	MIL	ALCN
First downs	12	27
Plays–yards	56–232	71–410
Rushes–yards	27–44	37–94
Passing yards	188	316
Passing: comp–att–int	17–29–0	30–34–0
Turnovers	1	0
Time of possession	30:01	29:59

Team	Category	Player	Statistics
Miles	Passing	Brinley Vandiver	15/25, 174 yards, TD
Miles	Rushing	Andre Gianopoulos	3 carries, 20 yards
Miles	Receiving	Glen Williams	3 receptions, 63 yards, TD
Alcorn State	Passing	Jaylon Tolbert	25/28, 265 yards, 5 TD
Alcorn State	Rushing	Carl McDonald Jr.	10 carries, 34 yards
Alcorn State	Receiving	Jamarr Ebron	6 receptions, 63 yards, 2 TD

=== at Southern Miss (FBS) ===
Alcorn State Braves (1–0) at Southern Miss Golden Eagles (FBS) (0–0) – Game summary

Quarter	1	2	3	4	Total
Braves	3	0	0	0	3
Golden Eagles (FBS)	7	14	21	7	49

at M.M. Roberts Stadium • Hattiesburg, Mississippi

- Date: September 5
- Game time: 4:00 p.m.
- Game weather: Sunny, 94 °F (34 °C)
- Game attendance: 26,246
- Referee: Brian Holland
- TV announcers (ESPN+): Jason Baker and Larry Boyd

Game information

First quarter

- ALCN – Kenyon Bowyer 22-yard field goal, 5:52. Braves 3–0. Drive: 4 plays, 5 yards, 1:38.
- USM – Steven Robinson 2-yard run (Creighton Willbanks kick), 2:29. Golden Eagles 7–3. Drive: 10 plays, 75 yards, 3:23.

Second quarter

- USM – Mario Sanders 38-yard pass from Ethan Hampton (Creighton Willbanks kick), 10:55. Golden Eagles 14–3. Drive: 11 plays, 80 yards, 3:53.
- USM – Jamarice Wilder 2-yard run (Creighton Willbanks kick), 0:08. Golden Eagles 21–3. Drive: 13 plays, 97 yards, 4:41.

Third quarter

- USM – Steven Robinson 3-yard run (Creighton Willbanks kick), 11:12. Golden Eagles 28–3. Drive: 8 plays, 70 yards, 3:41.
- USM – Jamarice Wilder 29-yard run (Creighton Willbanks kick), 9:23. Golden Eagles 35–3. Drive: 2 plays, 42 yards, 0:19.
- USM – Steven Robinson 2-yard run (Creighton Willbanks kick), 2:00. Golden Eagles 42–3. Drive: 6 plays, 36 yards, 2:09.

Fourth quarter

- USM – Robert Henderson 1-yard run (Creighton Willbanks kick), 11:11. Golden Eagles 49–3. Drive: 9 plays, 76 yards, 3:51.

Statistics	ALCN	USM
First downs	11	32
Plays–yards	58–223	84–543
Rushes–yards	35–104	57–317
Passing yards	119	226
Passing: comp–att–int	15–23–4	15–27–1
Turnovers	5	1
Time of possession	28:39	31:21

Team	Category	Player	Statistics
Alcorn State	Passing	Jaylon Tolbert	15/22, 119 yards, 4 INT
Alcorn State	Rushing	Joshua Tate	8 carries, 33 yards
Alcorn State	Receiving	Tyree Kelly	3 receptions, 39 yards
Southern Miss	Passing	Ethan Hampton	13/23, 180 yards, TD, INT
Southern Miss	Rushing	Steven Robinson	23 carries, 123 yards, 3 TD
Southern Miss	Receiving	Mario Sanders	6 receptions, 94 yards, TD

=== vs. Arkansas–Pine Bluff (Southern Heritage Classic) ===
Arkansas–Pine Bluff Golden Lions (1–1) vs. Alcorn State Braves (1–1) – Game summary

Quarter	1	2	3	4	Total
Golden Lions	0	0	0	0	0
Braves	0	0	0	0	0

at Simmons Bank Liberty Stadium • Memphis, Tennessee

- Date: September 12
- Game time: 6:00 p.m.

Game information

First quarter
Second quarter
Third quarter
Fourth quarter

Statistics	UAPB	ALCN
First downs		
Plays–yards		
Rushes–yards		
Passing yards		
Passing: comp–att–int		
Turnovers		
Time of possession		

Team	Category	Player	Statistics
Arkansas–Pine Bluff	Passing		
Arkansas–Pine Bluff	Rushing		
Arkansas–Pine Bluff	Receiving		
Alcorn State	Passing		
Alcorn State	Rushing		
Alcorn State	Receiving		

=== at North Alabama ===
Alcorn State Braves (2–1) at North Alabama Lions (1–2) – Game summary

Quarter	1	2	3	4	Total
Braves	0	0	0	0	0
Lions	0	0	0	0	0

at Bank Independent Stadium • Florence, Alabama

- Date: September 19
- Game time: 6:00 p.m.
- TV: ESPN+

Game information

First quarter
Second quarter
Third quarter
Fourth quarter

Statistics	ALCN	UNA
First downs		
Plays–yards		
Rushes–yards		
Passing yards		
Passing: comp–att–int		
Turnovers		
Time of possession		

Team	Category	Player	Statistics
Alcorn State	Passing		
Alcorn State	Rushing		
Alcorn State	Receiving		
North Alabama	Passing		
North Alabama	Rushing		
North Alabama	Receiving		

=== Texas Southern ===
Texas Southern Tigers (1–2) at Alcorn State Braves (2–2) – Game summary

Quarter	1	2	3	4	Total
Tigers	0	0	0	0	0
Braves	0	0	0	0	0

at Casem-Spinks Stadium • Lorman, Mississippi

- Date: September 26
- Game time: 3:00 p.m.
- Game attendance: 9,731
- TV: SWAC TV

Game information

First quarter
Second quarter
Third quarter
Fourth quarter

Statistics	TXSO	ALCN
First downs		
Plays–yards		
Rushes–yards		
Passing yards		
Passing: comp–att–int		
Turnovers		
Time of possession		

Team	Category	Player	Statistics
Texas Southern	Passing		
Texas Southern	Rushing		
Texas Southern	Receiving		
Alcorn State	Passing		
Alcorn State	Rushing		
Alcorn State	Receiving		

=== at Grambling State ===
Alcorn State Braves (3–2) at Grambling State Tigers (2–2) – Game summary

Quarter	1	2	3	4	Total
Braves	0	0	0	0	0
Tigers	0	0	0	0	0

at Eddie G. Robinson Memorial Stadium • Grambling, Louisiana

- Date: October 3
- Game time: 2:00 p.m.
- TV: SWAC TV

Game information

First quarter
Second quarter
Third quarter
Fourth quarter

Statistics	ALCN	GRAM
First downs		
Plays–yards		
Rushes–yards		
Passing yards		
Passing: comp–att–int		
Turnovers		
Time of possession		

Team	Category	Player	Statistics
Alcorn State	Passing		
Alcorn State	Rushing		
Alcorn State	Receiving		
Grambling State	Passing		
Grambling State	Rushing		
Grambling State	Receiving		

=== Arkansas Baptist (NAIA) ===
Arkansas Baptist Buffaloes (2–4) at Alcorn State Braves (3–3) – Game summary

Quarter	1	2	3	4	Total
Buffaloes (NAIA)	0	0	0	0	0
Braves	0	0	0	0	0

at Casem-Spinks Stadium • Lorman, Mississippi

- Date: October 10
- Game time: 2:00 p.m.

Game information

First quarter
Second quarter
Third quarter
Fourth quarter

Statistics	ARKB	ALCN
First downs		
Plays–yards		
Rushes–yards		
Passing yards		
Passing: comp–att–int		
Turnovers		
Time of possession		

Team	Category	Player	Statistics
Arkansas Baptist	Passing		
Arkansas Baptist	Rushing		
Arkansas Baptist	Receiving		
Alcorn State	Passing		
Alcorn State	Rushing		
Alcorn State	Receiving		

=== at Prairie View A&M ===
Alcorn State Braves (4–3) at Prairie View A&M Panthers (2–5) – Game summary

Quarter	1	2	3	4	Total
Braves	0	0	0	0	0
Panthers	0	0	0	0	0

at Panther Stadium • Prairie View, Texas

- Date: October 17
- Game time: 6:00 p.m.

Game information

First quarter
Second quarter
Third quarter
Fourth quarter

Statistics	ALCN	PV
First downs		
Plays–yards		
Rushes–yards		
Passing yards		
Passing: comp–att–int		
Turnovers		
Time of possession		

Team	Category	Player	Statistics
Alcorn State	Passing		
Alcorn State	Rushing		
Alcorn State	Receiving		
Prairie View A&M	Passing		
Prairie View A&M	Rushing		
Prairie View A&M	Receiving		

=== at Mississippi Valley State ===
Alcorn State Braves (4–4) at Mississippi Valley State Delta Devils (3–5) – Game summary

Quarter	1	2	3	4	Total
Braves	0	0	0	0	0
Delta Devils	0	0	0	0	0

at Rice–Totten Stadium • Itta Bena, Mississippi

- Date: October 31
- Game time: 2:00 p.m.

Game information

First quarter
Second quarter
Third quarter
Fourth quarter

Statistics	ALCN	MVSU
First downs		
Plays–yards		
Rushes–yards		
Passing yards		
Passing: comp–att–int		
Turnovers		
Time of possession		

Team	Category	Player	Statistics
Alcorn State	Passing		
Alcorn State	Rushing		
Alcorn State	Receiving		
Mississippi Valley State	Passing		
Mississippi Valley State	Rushing		
Mississippi Valley State	Receiving		

=== Florida A&M ===
Florida A&M Rattlers (2–7) at Alcorn State Braves (5–4) – Game summary

Quarter	1	2	3	4	Total
Rattlers	0	0	0	0	0
Braves	0	0	0	0	0

at Casem-Spinks Stadium • Lorman, Mississippi

- Date: November 7
- Game time: 3:00 p.m.

Game information

First quarter
Second quarter
Third quarter
Fourth quarter

Statistics	FAMU	ALCN
First downs		
Plays–yards		
Rushes–yards		
Passing yards		
Passing: comp–att–int		
Turnovers		
Time of possession		

Team	Category	Player	Statistics
Florida A&M	Passing		
Florida A&M	Rushing		
Florida A&M	Receiving		
Alcorn State	Passing		
Alcorn State	Rushing		
Alcorn State	Receiving		

=== at Southern ===
Alcorn State Braves (6–4) at Southern Jaguars (5–5) – Game summary

Quarter	1	2	3	4	Total
Braves	0	0	0	0	0
Jaguars	0	0	0	0	0

at A.W. Mumford Stadium • Baton Rouge, Louisiana

- Date: November 14
- Game time: 6:00 p.m.

Game information

First quarter
Second quarter
Third quarter
Fourth quarter

Statistics	ALCN	SOU
First downs		
Plays–yards		
Rushes–yards		
Passing yards		
Passing: comp–att–int		
Turnovers		
Time of possession		

Team	Category	Player	Statistics
Alcorn State	Passing		
Alcorn State	Rushing		
Alcorn State	Receiving		
Southern	Passing		
Southern	Rushing		
Southern	Receiving		

=== Jackson State (Soul Bowl) ===
Jackson State Tigers (7–3) at Alcorn State Braves (6–5) – Game summary

Quarter	1	2	3	4	Total
Tigers	0	0	0	0	0
Braves	0	0	0	0	0

at Casem-Spinks Stadium • Lorman, Mississippi

- Date: November 21
- Game time: 2:00 p.m.

Game information

First quarter
Second quarter
Third quarter
Fourth quarter

Statistics	JKST	ALCN
First downs		
Plays–yards		
Rushes–yards		
Passing yards		
Passing: comp–att–int		
Turnovers		
Time of possession		

Team	Category	Player	Statistics
Jackson State	Passing		
Jackson State	Rushing		
Jackson State	Receiving		
Alcorn State	Passing		
Alcorn State	Rushing		
Alcorn State	Receiving		
