= 2026 Grambling State Tigers football team =

American college football season

2026 Grambling State Tigers football
- Conference: Southwestern Athletic Conference
- West Division

Ranking
- BCFP: No. 6
- Record: 5–5 (3–4 SWAC)
- Head coach: Mickey Joseph (3rd season)
- Defensive coordinator: Jason Rollins (3rd season)
- Home stadium: Eddie G. Robinson Memorial Stadium

2026 Southwestern Athletic Conference football standings
	Conf.			Overall
Team	W		L	W		L
East Division
Alabama A&M	5	–	2	8	–	3
Alabama State	4	–	3	6	–	4
Jackson State	4	–	3	7	–	3
Bethune–Cookman	3	–	4	5	–	6
Florida A&M*	2	–	5	3	–	8
Mississippi Valley State*	2	–	5	3	–	8
West Division
Prairie View A&M	5	–	2	6	–	5
Arkansas–Pine Bluff	4	–	3	6	–	4
Southern	4	–	3	6	–	5
Alcorn State	4	–	3	6	–	5
Grambling State	3	–	4	5	–	5
Texas Southern	2	–	5	3	–	7
Championship: December 5, 2026
$ – Conference champion; x – Division champion/co-champions; y – Championship game participant; * – Ineligible for FCS postseason play due to failed academic requirements; As of November 16, 2026; Rankings from STATS Poll

The 2026 Grambling State Tigers football team will represent Grambling State University as a member of the Southwestern Athletic Conference (SWAC) during the 2026 NCAA Division I FCS football season. The Tigers will be led by third-year head coach Mickey Joseph and will play their home games at Eddie G. Robinson Memorial Stadium in Grambling, Louisiana.

== Schedule ==
Date	Time	Opponent	Site	TV	Result	Attendance
August 29	6:00 p.m.	Clark Atlanta*	Eddie G. Robinson Memorial Stadium; Grambling, LA	SWAC TV	W 49–7	11,337
September 5	6:00 p.m.	Central State (OH)*	Eddie G. Robinson Memorial Stadium; Grambling, LA	SWAC TV	W 48–26	8,675
September 12	7:00 p.m.	at TCU*	Amon G. Carter Stadium; Fort Worth, TX	ESPN+	L 7–63	37,600
September 26	6:00 p.m.	vs. Prairie View A&M	Cotton Bowl; Dallas, TX (State Fair Classic)	ESPN	L 14–21	42,942
October 3	2:00 p.m.	Alcorn State^{†}	Eddie G. Robinson Memorial Stadium; Grambling, LA	SWAC TV	W 63–59	16,549
October 10	4:00 p.m.	No. 22 Jackson State	Eddie G. Robinson Memorial Stadium; Grambling, LA	SWAC TV	W 45–38	15,434
October 17	2:00 p.m.	at Alabama A&M	Louis Crews Stadium; Huntsville, AL	SWAC TV	L 31–61	14,096
October 31	7:30 p.m.	at Texas Southern	W.W. Thorne Stadium; Houston, TX	SWAC TV	L 20–23 ^{OT}	7,115
November 7	2:00 p.m.	Arkansas–Pine Bluff	Eddie G. Robinson Memorial Stadium; Grambling, LA	SWAC TV	L 32–35	5,746
November 14	12:00 p.m.	at Bethune–Cookman	Daytona Stadium; Daytona Beach, FL	SWAC TV	W 32–21	5,151
November 28		vs. Southern	Caesars Superdome; New Orleans, LA (Bayou Classic)	NBC/Peacock		
*Non-conference game; ^{†}Homecoming; Rankings from STATS Poll released prior to the game; All times are in Central time

== Game summaries ==
=== Clark Atlanta (DII) ===
Clark Atlanta Panthers (DII) (0–0) at Grambling State Tigers (0–0) – Game summary

Quarter	1	2	3	4	Total
Panthers (DII)	0	0	7	0	7
Tigers	7	21	0	21	49

at Eddie G. Robinson Memorial Stadium • Grambling, Louisiana

- Date: August 29
- Game time: 6 p.m. CDT
- Game weather: Sunny • Temperature: 91 °F (33 °C) • Wind: E at 6 miles per hour (9.7 km/h)
- Game attendance: 11,337
- Referee: Nathan Pinkard
- TV announcers (SWAC TV): Santoria Black and Ken Moore

Game information

First quarter

- GRAM – Tony Phillips Jr. 89-yard kickoff return (Theodore Caballero kick), 14:46. Tigers 7–0.

Second quarter

- GRAM – Tony Phillips Jr. 20-yard run (Theodore Caballero kick), 14:54. Tigers 14–0. Drive: 7 plays, 87 yards, 3:21.
- GRAM – Tyson George 11-yard pass from Reginald Johnson (Theodore Caballero kick), 7:47. Tigers 21–0. Drive: 9 plays, 55 yards, 4:46.
- GRAM – Byron Eaton Jr. 7-yard pass from Jacobe Robinson (Theodore Caballero kick), 0:17. Tigers 28–0. Drive: 11 plays, 97 yards, 2:19.

Third quarter

- CLA – Chry'shawn Sellers 64-yard pass from Xzavier Johnson (Dylan Dastejerdi kick), 13:55. Tigers 28–7. Drive: 3 plays, 75 yards, 1:05.

Fourth quarter

- GRAM – Clyde McClendon Jr. 21-yard run (Theodore Caballero kick), 13:53. Tigers 35–7. Drive: 8 plays, 62 yards, 3:37.
- GRAM – Zerrick Jones 4-yard run (Theodore Caballero kick), 8:53. Tigers 42–7. Drive: 8 plays, 72 yards, 3:44.
- GRAM – D'Shuan Ford 2-yard run (Theodore Caballero kick), 5:42. Tigers 49–7. Drive: 4 plays, 34 yards, 1:34.

Statistics	CAU	GRAM
First downs	10	28
Plays–yards	55–224	74–487
Rushes–yards	30–94	39–223
Passing yards	130	264
Passing: comp–att–int	8–25–0	26–35–0
Turnovers	0	0
Time of possession	25:57	34:03

Team	Category	Player	Statistics
Clark Atlanta	Passing	Xzavier Jackson	6/20, 98 yards, TD
Clark Atlanta	Rushing	Trayvon Pinder	9 carries, 38 yards
Clark Atlanta	Receiving	Chry'shawn Sellers	4 receptions, 85 yards, TD
Grambling State	Passing	Reginald Johnson	15/17, 133 yards, TD
Grambling State	Rushing	Andre Crews	6 carries, 50 yards
Grambling State	Receiving	Jordan Bride	7 receptions, 72 yards

=== Central State (OH) (DII) ===
Central State (OH) Marauders (DII) (0–1) at Grambling State Tigers (1–0) – Game summary

Quarter	1	2	3	4	Total
Marauders (DII)	0	10	0	16	26
Tigers	13	14	7	14	48

at Eddie G. Robinson Memorial Stadium • Grambling, Louisiana

- Date: September 5
- Game time: 7:00 p.m.
- Game weather: Cloudy • Temperature: 91 °F (33 °C) • Wind: E at 8 miles per hour (13 km/h)
- Referee: Trennis Livingston
- TV: SWAC TV

Game information

First quarter

- GRAM – Jamarion Parker 40-yard run (Theodore Caballero kick), 12:46. Tigers 7–0. Drive: 5 plays, 75 yards, 2:08.
- GRAM – Diego Alfaro 19-yard field goal, 7:28. Tigers 10–0. Drive: 8 plays, 52 yards, 3:59.
- GRAM – Diego Alfaro 24-yard field goal, 2:09. Tigers 13–0. Drive: 8 plays, 57 yards, 3:46.

Second quarter

- GRAM – D'Shuan Ford 2-yard run (Theodore Caballero kick), 8:20. Tigers 20–0. Drive: 9 plays, 76 yards, 5:00.
- CEN – Kenyon Gardner 31-yard field goal, 4:58. Tigers 20–3. Drive: 9 plays, 44 yards, 3:12.
- GRAM – Tony Phillips Jr. 75-yard run (Theodore Caballero kick), 4:43. Tigers 27–3. Drive: 2 plays, 75 yards, 0:15.
- CEN – Damon Griffin II 12-yard pass from Jackson Wasik (Kenyon Gardner kick), 1:48. Tigers 27–10. Drive: 10 plays, 67 yards, 2:55.

Third quarter

- GRAM – Clyde McClendon Jr. 2-yard run (Theodore Caballero kick), 7:34. Tigers 34–10. Drive: 9 plays, 45 yards, 5:08.

Fourth quarter

- CEN – Jackson Wasik 15-yard run (Jackson Wasik–Avantae Burt pass), 9:59. Tigers 34–18. Drive: 7 plays, 87 yards, 2:40.
- GRAM – Byron Eaton Jr. 58-yard run (Theodore Caballero kick), 8:20. Tigers 41–18. Drive: 3 plays, 65 yards, 1:39.
- CEN – Avantae Burt 29-yard pass from Jackson Wasik (Jackson Wasik–Andreus Cox pass), 4:47. Tigers 41–26. Drive: 7 plays, 72 yards, 3:26.
- GRAM – Hayden Benoit 1-yard run (Theodore Caballero kick), 0:31. Tigers 48–26. Drive: 8 plays, 75 yards, 4:16.

Statistics	CTOH	GRAM
First downs	18	26
Plays–yards	60–386	68–644
Rushes–yards	32–138	40–361
Passing yards	248	283
Passing: comp–att–int	15–28–0	19–28–2
Turnovers	1	3
Time of possession	26:49	33:11

Team	Category	Player	Statistics
Central State (OH)	Passing	Jackson Wasik	15/28, 248 yards, 2 TD
Central State (OH)	Rushing	Isaiah Thompson	15 carries, 106 yards
Central State (OH)	Receiving	Damon Griffin II	4 receptions, 88 yards, TD
Grambling State	Passing	Reginald Johnson	18/23, 258 yards, INT
Grambling State	Rushing	Tony Phillips Jr.	2 carries, 73 yards, TD
Grambling State	Receiving	Tyson George	5 receptions, 93 yards

=== at TCU (FBS) ===
Grambling State Tigers (2–0) at TCU Horned Frogs (FBS) (0–1) – Game summary

Quarter	1	2	3	4	Total
Tigers	0	7	0	0	7
Horned Frogs (FBS)	7	21	14	21	63

at Amon G. Carter Stadium • Fort Worth, Texas

- Date: September 12
- Game time: 7:00 p.m.
- Game weather: Sunny • Temperature: 100 °F (38 °C) • Wind: SE at 12 miles per hour (19 km/h)
- Game attendance: 37,600
- Referee: Dan Scanlan
- TV announcers (ESPN+): James Westling and Craig Haubert

Game information

First quarter

- TCU – Major Everhart 8-yard run (Nate McCashland kick), 12:21. Horned Frogs 7–0. Drive: 6 plays, 78 yards, 2:33.

Second quarter

- TCU – Jon Denman 1-yard run (Nate McCashland kick), 10:53. Horned Frogs 14–0. Drive: 6 plays, 45 yards, 2:34.
- TCU – Ka'Morreun Pimpton 9-yard pass from Jaden Craig (Nate McCashland kick), 8:26. Horned Frogs 21–0. Drive: 5 plays, 66 yards, 1:21.
- GRAM – Byron Eaton Jr. 7-yard pass from Reginald Johnson (Theodore Caballero kick), 4:25. Horned Frogs 21–7. Drive: 8 plays, 91 yards, 3:56.
- TCU – Joe Pitchford 1-yard run (Nate McCashland kick), 1:48. Horned Frogs 28–7. Drive: 7 plays, 76 yards, 2:31.

Third quarter

- TCU – Kari Ashley 29-yard pass from Jaden Craig (Nate McCashland kick), 9:23. Horned Frogs 35–7. Drive: 3 plays, 65 yards, 1:11.
- TCU – Jeremy Scott 52-yard pass from Jaden Craig (Nate McCashland kick), 2:20. Horned Frogs 42–7. Drive: 1 play, 42 yards, 0:33.

Fourth quarter

- TCU – Kari Ashley 15-yard pass from Jaden Craig (Nate McCashland kick), 12:23. Horned Frogs 49–7. Drive: 8 plays, 70 yards, 2:55.
- TCU – Teon Parks 67-yard interception return (Nate McCashland kick), 9:52. Horned Frogs 56–7.
- TCU – Amante Martin 10-yard run (Nate McCashland kick), 3:24. Horned Frogs 63–7. Drive: 8 plays, 70 yards, 4:12.

Statistics	GRAM	TCU
First downs	7	33
Plays–yards	53–210	59–676
Rushes–yards	28–20	37–285
Passing yards	190	391
Passing: comp–att–int	14–25–2	24–32–0
Turnovers	2	1
Time of possession	30:26	29:34

Team	Category	Player	Statistics
Grambling State	Passing	Reginald Johnson	14/20, 190 yards, TD
Grambling State	Rushing	Jamarion Parker	5 carries, 9 yards
Grambling State	Receiving	Jordan Bride	4 receptions, 79 yards
TCU	Passing	Jaden Craig	24/31, 391 yards, 4 TD
TCU	Rushing	Jeremy Payne	9 carries, 79 yards
TCU	Receiving	Kari Ashley	7 receptions, 119 yards, 2 TD

=== vs. Prairie View A&M (State Fair Classic) ===
Prairie View A&M Panthers (1–3) vs. Grambling State Tigers (2–1) – Game summary

Quarter	1	2	3	4	Total
Panthers	0	0	0	0	0
Tigers	0	0	0	0	0

at Cotton Bowl • Dallas, Texas

- Date: September 26
- Game time: 6:00 p.m.
- TV: ESPN

Game information

First quarter
Second quarter
Third quarter
Fourth quarter

Statistics	PV	GRAM
First downs		
Plays–yards		
Rushes–yards		
Passing yards		
Passing: comp–att–int		
Turnovers		
Time of possession		

Team	Category	Player	Statistics
Prairie View A&M	Passing		
Prairie View A&M	Rushing		
Prairie View A&M	Receiving		
Grambling State	Passing		
Grambling State	Rushing		
Grambling State	Receiving		

=== Alcorn State ===
Alcorn State Braves (3–2) at Grambling State Tigers (2–2) – Game summary

Quarter	1	2	3	4	Total
Braves	0	0	0	0	0
Tigers	0	0	0	0	0

at Eddie G. Robinson Memorial Stadium • Grambling, Louisiana

- Date: October 3
- Game time: 2:00 p.m.
- TV: SWAC TV

Game information

First quarter
Second quarter
Third quarter
Fourth quarter

Statistics	ALCN	GRAM
First downs		
Plays–yards		
Rushes–yards		
Passing yards		
Passing: comp–att–int		
Turnovers		
Time of possession		

Team	Category	Player	Statistics
Alcorn State	Passing		
Alcorn State	Rushing		
Alcorn State	Receiving		
Grambling State	Passing		
Grambling State	Rushing		
Grambling State	Receiving		

=== No. 22 Jackson State ===
No. 22 Jackson State Tigers (5–0) at Grambling State Tigers (3–2) – Game summary

Quarter	1	2	3	4	Total
No. 22 Jackson State	0	0	0	0	0
Grambling State	0	0	0	0	0

at Eddie G. Robinson • Grambling, Louisiana

- Date: October 10

Game information

First quarter
Second quarter
Third quarter
Fourth quarter

Statistics	JKST	GRAM
First downs		
Plays–yards		
Rushes–yards		
Passing yards		
Passing: comp–att–int		
Turnovers		
Time of possession		

Team	Category	Player	Statistics
Jackson State	Passing		
Jackson State	Rushing		
Jackson State	Receiving		
Grambling State	Passing		
Grambling State	Rushing		
Grambling State	Receiving		

=== at Alabama A&M ===
Grambling State Tigers (4–2) at Alabama A&M Bulldogs (5–2) – Game summary

Quarter	1	2	3	4	Total
Tigers	0	0	0	0	0
Bulldogs	0	0	0	0	0

at Louis Crews Stadium • Normal, Alabama

- Date: October 17
- Game time: 2:00 p.m.

Game information

First quarter
Second quarter
Third quarter
Fourth quarter

Statistics	GRAM	AAMU
First downs		
Plays–yards		
Rushes–yards		
Passing yards		
Passing: comp–att–int		
Turnovers		
Time of possession		

Team	Category	Player	Statistics
Grambling State	Passing		
Grambling State	Rushing		
Grambling State	Receiving		
Alabama A&M	Passing		
Alabama A&M	Rushing		
Alabama A&M	Receiving		

=== at Texas Southern ===
Grambling State Tigers (4–3) at Texas Southern Tigers (2–5) – Game summary

Quarter	1	2	3	4	Total
Grambling State	0	0	0	0	0
Texas Southern	0	0	0	0	0

at W.W. Thorne Stadium • Houston, Texas

- Date: October 31

Game information

First quarter
Second quarter
Third quarter
Fourth quarter

Statistics	GRAM	TXSO
First downs		
Plays–yards		
Rushes–yards		
Passing yards		
Passing: comp–att–int		
Turnovers		
Time of possession		

Team	Category	Player	Statistics
Grambling State	Passing		
Grambling State	Rushing		
Grambling State	Receiving		
Texas Southern	Passing		
Texas Southern	Rushing		
Texas Southern	Receiving		

=== Arkansas–Pine Bluff ===
Arkansas–Pine Bluff Golden Lions (5–3) at Grambling State Tigers (4–4) – Game summary

Quarter	1	2	3	4	Total
Golden Lions	0	0	0	0	0
Tigers	0	0	0	0	0

at Eddie G. Robinson Memorial Stadium • Grambling, Louisiana

- Date: November 7

Game information

First quarter
Second quarter
Third quarter
Fourth quarter

Statistics	UAPB	GRAM
First downs		
Plays–yards		
Rushes–yards		
Passing yards		
Passing: comp–att–int		
Turnovers		
Time of possession		

Team	Category	Player	Statistics
Arkansas–Pine Bluff	Passing		
Arkansas–Pine Bluff	Rushing		
Arkansas–Pine Bluff	Receiving		
Grambling State	Passing		
Grambling State	Rushing		
Grambling State	Receiving		

=== at Bethune–Cookman ===
Grambling State Tigers (4–5) at Bethune–Cookman Wildcats (5–5) – Game summary

Quarter	1	2	3	4	Total
Tigers	0	0	0	0	0
Wildcats	0	0	0	0	0

at Daytona Stadium • Daytona Beach, Florida

- Date: November 14

Game information

First quarter
Second quarter
Third quarter
Fourth quarter

Statistics	GRAM	BCU
First downs		
Plays–yards		
Rushes–yards		
Passing yards		
Passing: comp–att–int		
Turnovers		
Time of possession		

Team	Category	Player	Statistics
Grambling State	Passing		
Grambling State	Rushing		
Grambling State	Receiving		
Bethune–Cookman	Passing		
Bethune–Cookman	Rushing		
Bethune–Cookman	Receiving		

=== vs. Southern (Bayou Classic) ===
Southern Jaguars (6–5) vs. Grambling State Tigers (5–5) – Game summary

Quarter	1	2	3	4	Total
Panthers	0	0	0	0	0
Tigers	0	0	0	0	0

at Caesars Superdome • New Orleans, Louisiana

- Date: November 28

Game information

First quarter
Second quarter
Third quarter
Fourth quarter

Statistics	SOU	GRAM
First downs		
Plays–yards		
Rushes–yards		
Passing yards		
Passing: comp–att–int		
Turnovers		
Time of possession		

Team	Category	Player	Statistics
Southern	Passing		
Southern	Rushing		
Southern	Receiving		
Grambling State	Passing		
Grambling State	Rushing		
Grambling State	Receiving		
