= 2026 Arkansas–Pine Bluff Golden Lions football team =

American college football season

2026 Arkansas–Pine Bluff Golden Lions football
- Conference: Southwestern Athletic Conference
- West Division

Ranking
- BCFP: No. 6
- Record: 7–4 (5–3 SWAC)
- Head coach: Alonzo Hampton (4th season)
- Co-offensive coordinators: Pierre Ingram (1st season); Stephen Barnette (1st season)
- Offensive scheme: Spread
- Defensive coordinator: Jeff Burrow (2nd season)
- Base defense: 4–2–5
- Home stadium: Simmons Bank Field

2026 Southwestern Athletic Conference football standings
	Conf.			Overall
Team	W		L	W		L
East Division
Alabama A&M x	6	–	2	9	–	3
Jackson State	5	–	3	8	–	3
Alabama State	4	–	4	6	–	5
Florida A&M*	3	–	5	4	–	8
Bethune–Cookman	3	–	5	5	–	7
Mississippi Valley State*	2	–	6	3	–	9
West Division
Prairie View A&M x	6	–	2	7	–	5
Arkansas–Pine Bluff	5	–	3	7	–	4
Southern	4	–	3	6	–	5
Alcorn State	4	–	4	6	–	6
Grambling State	3	–	4	5	–	5
Texas Southern	2	–	6	3	–	8
Championship: December 5, 2026
$ – Conference champion; x – Division champion/co-champions; y – Championship game participant; * – Ineligible for FCS postseason play due to failed academic requirements; As of November 22, 2026; Rankings from STATS Poll

The 2026 Arkansas–Pine Bluff Golden Lions football team will represent the University of Arkansas at Pine Bluff (UAPB) as a member of the Southwestern Athletic Conference (SWAC) during the 2026 NCAA Division I FCS football season. The Golden Lions will be led by fourth-year head coach Alonzo Hampton and will play their home games at Simmons Bank Field in Pine Bluff, Arkansas.

== Schedule ==
Date	Time	Opponent	Site	TV	Result	Attendance
August 29	6:00 p.m.	vs. Morehouse*	War Memorial Stadium; Little Rock, AR (Natural State Kickoff Classic)	SWAC TV	W 35–15	17,300
September 3	7:00 p.m.	at No. 25 (FBS) Missouri*	Faurot Field; Columbia, MO	SECN	L 14–54	63,609
September 12	6:00 p.m.	vs. Alcorn State	Simmons Bank Liberty Stadium; Memphis, TN (Southern Heritage Classic)	HBCU GO	L 51–53 ^{2OT}	21,881
September 19	4:00 p.m.	Central State (OH)*	Simmons Bank Field; Pine Bluff, AR	SWAC TV	W 41–35	7,325
October 3	6:00 p.m.	at Southern	A. W. Mumford Stadium; Baton Rouge, LA	SWAC TV	W 41–10	21,890
October 17	2:00 p.m.	Alabama State^{†}	Simmons Bank Field; Pine Bluff, AR	SWAC TV	L 15–21	
October 24	2:00 p.m.	at Florida A&M	Bragg Memorial Stadium; Tallahassee, FL	HBCU GO	W 31–28	20,549
October 31	2:00 p.m.	Bethune–Cookman	Simmons Bank Field; Pine Bluff, AR	SWAC TV	W 63–21	5,231
November 7	2:00 p.m.	at Grambling State	Eddie G. Robinson Memorial Stadium; Grambling, LA	SWAC TV	W 35–32	5,746
November 14	2:00 p.m.	Prairie View A&M	Simmons Bank Field; Pine Bluff, AR	SWAC TV	L 10–13	7,172
November 21	2:00 p.m.	at Texas Southern	W.W. Thorne Stadium; Houston, TX	HBCU GO	W 42–17	3,012
*Non-conference game; ^{†}Homecoming; Rankings from STATS Poll released prior to the game; All times are in Central time

== Game summaries ==
=== Vs. Morehouse (DII – Natural State Kickoff Classic) ===
Morehouse Maroon Tigers (DII) (0–0) vs. Arkansas–Pine Bluff Golden Lions (0–0) – Game summary

Quarter	1	2	3	4	Total
Maroon Tigers (DII)	0	15	0	0	15
Golden Lions	7	14	14	0	35

at War Memorial Stadium • Little Rock, Arkansas

- Date: August 29
- Game time: 6:00 p.m.
- Game weather: Clear • Temperature: 88 °F (31 °C) • Wind: SE at 6 miles per hour (9.7 km/h)
- Game attendance: 17,300
- Referee: Ivan Daniels
- TV announcers (SWAC TV): LaRon Marbley and Carlos James

Game information

First quarter

- UAPB – Jaylen Jennings 5-yard run (Trey Glymph kick), 11:00. Golden Lions 7–0. Drive: 4 plays, 24 yards, 1:48.

Second quarter

- UAPB – Demetric Whitlock 94-yard pass from Garrison Davis (Trey Glymph kick), 12:11. Golden Lions 14–0. Drive: 1 play, 94 yards, 0:12.
- MOR – Miles Scott 1-yard run (Davis Rowe kick), 8:04. Golden Lions 14–7. Drive: 9 plays, 64 yards, 4:00.
- UAPB – Jalen Williams 70-yard run (Trey Glymph kick), 7:44. Golden Lions 21–7. Drive: 1 play, 70 yards, 0:12.
- MOR – Miles Scott 2-yard run (Bryson Easley–Jeremiah Gibson pass), 3:32. Golden Lions 21–15. Drive: 9 plays, 74 yards, 4:02.

Third quarter

- UAPB – Demetric Whitlock 13-yard pass from Garrison Davis (Trey Glymph kick), 9:39. Golden Lions 28–15. Drive: 7 plays, 56 yards, 4:22.
- UAPB – Demetric Whitlock 39-yard pass from Jack Schierholz (Trey Glymph kick), 7:05. Golden Lions 35–15. Drive: 4 plays, 63 yards, 1:17.

Fourth quarter

- No scoring plays.

Statistics	MOR	UAPB
First downs	22	17
Plays–yards	76–376	51–386
Rushes–yards	38–90	32–154
Passing yards	286	232
Passing: comp–att–int	26–38–0	13–19–2
Turnovers	2	2
Time of possession	34:44	25:16

Team	Category	Player	Statistics
Morehouse	Passing	Miles Scott	25/36, 284 yards
Morehouse	Rushing	Miles Scott	10 carries, 34 yards, 2 TD
Morehouse	Receiving	Jeremiah Gibson	3 receptions, 89 yards
Arkansas–Pine Bluff	Passing	Garrison Davis	10/15, 182 yards, 2 TD, INT
Arkansas–Pine Bluff	Rushing	Jalen Williams	2 carries, 76 yards, TD
Arkansas–Pine Bluff	Receiving	Demetric Whitlock	5 receptions, 160 yards, 3 TD

=== at No. 25 (FBS) Missouri ===
Arkansas–Pine Bluff Golden Lions (1–0) at No. 25 (FBS) Missouri Tigers (0–0) – Game summary

Quarter	1	2	3	4	Total
Golden Lions	0	0	7	7	14
No. 25 (FBS) Tigers	14	26	0	14	54

at Farout Field • Columbia, Missouri

- Date: September 3
- Game time: 7:00 p.m.
- Game weather: Sunny • Temperature: 90 °F (32 °C) • Wind: SE at 3 miles per hour (4.8 km/h)
- Game attendance: 63,609
- Referee: Daniel Gautreaux
- TV announcers (SECN): Chuckie Kempf, Dustin Fox, and Marilyn Payne

Game information

First quarter

- (9:38) MIZ: Shaun Terry II 25-yard pass from Austin Simmons (Blake Craig kick) (Drive: 11 plays, 70 yards, 5:22; Missouri 7–0)
- (4:16) MIZ: Donovan Olugbode 14-yard pass from Austin Simmons (Blake Craig kick) (Drive: 9 plays, 49 yards, 4:10; Missouri 14–0)

Second quarter

- (12:56) MIZ: Jamal Roberts 1 yard run (Blake Craig kick) (Drive: 10 plays, 57 yards, 4:59; Missouri 21–0)
- (5:52) Team Safety Missouri 23–0
- (5:44) MIZ: Donovan Olugbode 35-yard pass from Austin Simmons (Blake Craig kick) (Drive: 1 play, 35 yards, 0:08; Missouri 30–0)
- (4:01) MIZ: Cayden Lee 47-yard pass from Austin Simmons (Blake Craig kick) (Drive: 2 plays, 57 yards, 0:27; Missouri 37–0)
- (0:00) MIZ: Blake Craig 32 yard field goal (Drive: 9 plays, 66 yards, 1:34; Missouri 40–0)

Third quarter

- (2:31) UAPB: Za'Marion Webber 27 yard run (Trey Glymph kick) (Drive: 7 plays, 80 yards, 3:09; Missouri 40–7)

Fourth quarter

- (10:00) MIZ: Matt Zollers 5 yard run (Blake Craig kick) (Drive: 5 plays, 44 yards, 2:06; Missouri 47–7)
- (6:13) UAPB: David Brewer IV 16 yard pass from Jack Schierholz (Trey Glymph kick) (Drive: 7 plays, 75 yards, 3:47; Missouri 47–14)
- (3:49) MIZ: Preston Hatfield 9 yard run (Blake Craig kick) (Drive: 6 plays, 50 yards, 2:23; Missouri 54–14)

Statistics	UAPB	MIZ
First downs	13	33
Plays–yards	53–198	78–562
Rushes–yards	29–89	45–205
Passing yards	109	357
Passing: comp–att–int	11–24–0	26–33–0
Turnovers	0	1
Time of possession	26:02	33:58

Team	Category	Player	Statistics
UAPB	Passing	Jack Schierholz	4/10, 67 yards, TD
UAPB	Rushing	Za'Marion Webber	7 carries, 56 yards, TD
UAPB	Receiving	David Brewer IV	2 receptions, 29 yards, TD
Missouri	Passing	Austin Simmons	17/19, 252 yards, 4 TD
Missouri	Rushing	Jamal Roberts	13 carries, 47 yards, TD
Missouri	Receiving	Donovan Olugbode	8 receptions, 116 yards, 2 TD

=== vs. Alcorn State (Southern Heritage Classic) ===
Arkansas–Pine Bluff Golden Lions (1–1) vs. Alcorn State Braves (1–1) – Game summary

Quarter	1	2	3	4	Total
Golden Lions	0	0	0	0	0
Braves	0	0	0	0	0

at Simmons Bank Liberty Stadium • Memphis, Tennessee

- Date: September 12
- Game time: 6:00 p.m.

Game information

First quarter
Second quarter
Third quarter
Fourth quarter

Statistics	UAPB	ALCN
First downs		
Plays–yards		
Rushes–yards		
Passing yards		
Passing: comp–att–int		
Turnovers		
Time of possession		

Team	Category	Player	Statistics
Arkansas–Pine Bluff	Passing		
Arkansas–Pine Bluff	Rushing		
Arkansas–Pine Bluff	Receiving		
Alcorn State	Passing		
Alcorn State	Rushing		
Alcorn State	Receiving		

=== Central State (OH) (DII) ===
Central State Marauders (1–2) at Arkansas–Pine Bluff Golden Lions (1–2) – Game summary

Quarter	1	2	3	4	Total
Marauders (DII)	0	0	0	0	0
Golden Lions	0	0	0	0	0

at Simmons Bank Field • Pine Bluff, Arkansas

- Date: September 19
- Game time: 4:00 p.m.

Game information

First quarter
Second quarter
Third quarter
Fourth quarter

Statistics	CTOH	UAPB
First downs		
Plays–yards		
Rushes–yards		
Passing yards		
Passing: comp–att–int		
Turnovers		
Time of possession		

Team	Category	Player	Statistics
Central State (OH)	Passing		
Central State (OH)	Rushing		
Central State (OH)	Receiving		
Arkansas–Pine Bluff	Passing		
Arkansas–Pine Bluff	Rushing		
Arkansas–Pine Bluff	Receiving		

=== at Southern ===
Arkansas–Pine Bluff Golden Lions (2–2) at Southern Jaguars (2–3) – Game summary

Quarter	1	2	3	4	Total
Golden Lions	0	0	0	0	0
Jaguars	0	0	0	0	0

at A.W. Mumford Stadium • Baton Rouge, Louisiana

- Date: October 3
- Game time: 6:00 p.m.
- TV: SWAC TV

Game information

First quarter
Second quarter
Third quarter
Fourth quarter

Statistics	UAPB	SOU
First downs		
Plays–yards		
Rushes–yards		
Passing yards		
Passing: comp–att–int		
Turnovers		
Time of possession		

Team	Category	Player	Statistics
Arkansas–Pine Bluff	Passing		
Arkansas–Pine Bluff	Rushing		
Arkansas–Pine Bluff	Receiving		
Southern	Passing		
Southern	Rushing		
Southern	Receiving		

=== Alabama State ===
Alabama State Hornets (3–3) at Arkansas–Pine Bluff Golden Lions (3–2) – Game summary

Quarter	1	2	3	4	Total
Hornets	0	0	0	0	0
Golden Lions	0	0	0	0	0

at Simmons Bank Field • Pine Bluff, Arkansas

- Date: October 17
- Game time: 2:00 p.m.

Game information

First quarter
Second quarter
Third quarter
Fourth quarter

Statistics	ALST	UAPB
First downs		
Plays–yards		
Rushes–yards		
Passing yards		
Passing: comp–att–int		
Turnovers		
Time of possession		

Team	Category	Player	Statistics
Alabama State	Passing		
Alabama State	Rushing		
Alabama State	Receiving		
Arkansas–Pine Bluff	Passing		
Arkansas–Pine Bluff	Rushing		
Arkansas–Pine Bluff	Receiving		

=== at Florida A&M ===
Arkansas–Pine Bluff Golden Lions (3–3) at Florida A&M Rattlers (2–5) – Game summary

Quarter	1	2	3	4	Total
Golden Lions	0	0	0	0	0
Rattlers	0	0	0	0	0

at Bragg Memorial Stadium • Tallahassee, Florida

- Date: October 24
- Game time: 2:00 p.m.

Game information

First quarter
Second quarter
Third quarter
Fourth quarter

Statistics	UAPB	FAMU
First downs		
Plays–yards		
Rushes–yards		
Passing yards		
Passing: comp–att–int		
Turnovers		
Time of possession		

Team	Category	Player	Statistics
Arkansas–Pine Bluff	Passing		
Arkansas–Pine Bluff	Rushing		
Arkansas–Pine Bluff	Receiving		
Florida A&M	Passing		
Florida A&M	Rushing		
Florida A&M	Receiving		

=== Bethune–Cookman ===
Bethune–Cookman Wildcats (5–3) at Arkansas–Pine Bluff Golden Lions (4–3) – Game summary

Quarter	1	2	3	4	Total
Wildcats	0	0	0	0	0
Golden Lions	0	0	0	0	0

at Simmons Bank Field • Pine Bluff, Arkansas

- Date: October 31
- Game time: 2:00 p.m.

Game information

First quarter
Second quarter
Third quarter
Fourth quarter

Statistics	BCU	UAPB
First downs		
Plays–yards		
Rushes–yards		
Passing yards		
Passing: comp–att–int		
Turnovers		
Time of possession		

Team	Category	Player	Statistics
Bethune–Cookman	Passing		
Bethune–Cookman	Rushing		
Bethune–Cookman	Receiving		
Arkansas–Pine Bluff	Passing		
Arkansas–Pine Bluff	Rushing		
Arkansas–Pine Bluff	Receiving		

=== at Grambling State ===
Arkansas–Pine Bluff Golden Lions (5–3) at Grambling State Tigers (4–4) – Game summary

Quarter	1	2	3	4	Total
Golden Lions	0	0	0	0	0
Tigers	0	0	0	0	0

at Eddie G. Robinson Memorial Stadium • Grambling, Louisiana

- Date: November 7

Game information

First quarter
Second quarter
Third quarter
Fourth quarter

Statistics	UAPB	GRAM
First downs		
Plays–yards		
Rushes–yards		
Passing yards		
Passing: comp–att–int		
Turnovers		
Time of possession		

Team	Category	Player	Statistics
Arkansas–Pine Bluff	Passing		
Arkansas–Pine Bluff	Rushing		
Arkansas–Pine Bluff	Receiving		
Grambling State	Passing		
Grambling State	Rushing		
Grambling State	Receiving		

=== Prairie View A&M ===
Prairie View A&M Panthers (5–5) at Arkansas–Pine Bluff Golden Lions (6–3) – Game summary

Quarter	1	2	3	4	Total
Panthers	0	0	0	0	0
Golden Lions	0	0	0	0	0

at Simmons Bank Field • Pine Bluff, Arkansas

- Date: November 14
- Game time: 2:00 p.m.

Game information

First quarter
Second quarter
Third quarter
Fourth quarter

Statistics	PV	UAPB
First downs		
Plays–yards		
Rushes–yards		
Passing yards		
Passing: comp–att–int		
Turnovers		
Time of possession		

Team	Category	Player	Statistics
Prairie View A&M	Passing		
Prairie View A&M	Rushing		
Prairie View A&M	Receiving		
Arkansas–Pine Bluff	Passing		
Arkansas–Pine Bluff	Rushing		
Arkansas–Pine Bluff	Receiving		

=== at Texas Southern ===
Arkansas–Pine Bluff Golden Lions (6–4) at Texas Southern Tigers (3–7) – Game summary

Quarter	1	2	3	4	Total
Golden Lions	0	0	0	0	0
Tigers	0	0	0	0	0

at W.W. Thorne Stadium • Houston, Texas

- Date: November 21
- Game time: 2:00 p.m.

Game information

First quarter
Second quarter
Third quarter
Fourth quarter

Statistics	UAPB	TXSO
First downs		
Plays–yards		
Rushes–yards		
Passing yards		
Passing: comp–att–int		
Turnovers		
Time of possession		

Team	Category	Player	Statistics
Arkansas–Pine Bluff	Passing		
Arkansas–Pine Bluff	Rushing		
Arkansas–Pine Bluff	Receiving		
Texas Southern	Passing		
Texas Southern	Rushing		
Texas Southern	Receiving		
