= 2026 Mississippi Valley State Delta Devils football team =

American college football season

2026 Mississippi Valley State Delta Devils football
- Conference: Southwestern Athletic Conference
- East Division
- Record: 3–9 (2–6 SWAC)
- Head coach: Terrell Buckley (2nd season)
- Offensive coordinator: Grant Simms (1st season)
- Offensive scheme: Pro spread
- Defensive coordinator: Kelvin Smith (1st season)
- Base defense: 4–3
- Home stadium: Rice–Totten Stadium

2026 Southwestern Athletic Conference football standings
	Conf.			Overall
Team	W		L	W		L
East Division
Alabama A&M x	6	–	2	9	–	3
Jackson State	5	–	3	8	–	3
Alabama State	4	–	4	6	–	5
Florida A&M*	3	–	5	4	–	8
Bethune–Cookman	3	–	5	5	–	7
Mississippi Valley State*	2	–	6	3	–	9
West Division
Prairie View A&M x	6	–	2	7	–	5
Arkansas–Pine Bluff	5	–	3	7	–	4
Southern	4	–	3	6	–	5
Alcorn State	4	–	4	6	–	6
Grambling State	3	–	4	5	–	5
Texas Southern	2	–	6	3	–	8
Championship: December 5, 2026
$ – Conference champion; x – Division champion/co-champions; y – Championship game participant; * – Ineligible for FCS postseason play due to failed academic requirements; As of November 22, 2026; Rankings from STATS Poll

The 2026 Mississippi Valley State Delta Devils football team will represent Mississippi Valley State University as a member of the Southwestern Athletic Conference (SWAC) during the 2026 NCAA Division I FCS football season. The Delta Devils will be led by second-year head coach Terrell Buckley and will play their home games at Rice–Totten Stadium in Itta Bena, Mississippi.

== Schedule ==
Date	Time	Opponent	Site	TV	Result	Attendance
August 27	6:00 p.m.	at Nicholls*	Manning Field at John L. Guidry Stadium; Thibodaux, LA	ESPN+	L 10–44	3,582
September 5	9:00 p.m.	at Sacramento State*	Hornet Stadium; Sacramento, CA	ESPN+	L 0–52	18,523
September 12	3:00 p.m.	vs. Lincoln (PA)*	Soldier Field; Chicago, IL (Chicago Football Classic)	SWAC TV	W 31–20	34,300
September 19	6:00 p.m.	Delta State*	Rice–Totten Stadium; Itta Bena, MS	SWAC TV	L 6–21	1,575
September 26	5:00 p.m.	at Alabama State	ASU Stadium; Montgomery, AL	SWAC TV	L 15–41	15,789
October 3	2:00 p.m.	Prairie View A&M	Rice–Totten Stadium; Itta Bena, MS	SWAC TV	W 28–27	900
October 10	2:00 p.m.	at Texas Southern	W.W. Thorne Stadium; Houston, TX	SWAC TV	W 38–34	
October 17	2:00 p.m.	Bethune–Cookman^{†}	Rice–Totten Stadium; Itta Bena, MS	SWAC TV	L 14–34	5,732
October 31	2:00 p.m.	Alcorn State	Rice–Totten Stadium; Itta Bena, MS	SWAC TV	L 17–52	5,600
November 7	2:00 p.m.	at Jackson State	Mississippi Veterans Memorial Stadium; Jackson, MS	HBCU GO	L 7–38	16,386
November 14	2:00 p.m.	at Florida A&M	Bragg Memorial Stadium; Tallahassee, FL	SWAC TV	L 13–16	7,002
November 21	2:00 p.m.	Alabama A&M	Rice–Totten Stadium; Itta Bena, MS	SWAC TV	L 19–51	1,123
*Non-conference game; ^{†}Homecoming; All times are in Central time

== Game summaries ==
=== at Nicholls ===
Mississippi Valley State Delta Devils (0–0) at Nicholls Colonels (0–0) – Game summary

Quarter	1	2	3	4	Total
Delta Devils	0	0	0	10	10
Colonels	14	23	7	0	44

at John L. Guidry Stadium • Thibodaux, Louisiana

- Date: August 27
- Game time: 6:00 p.m.
- Game weather: Cloudy
- Game attendance: 3,582
- Referee: Gary Leeper
- TV announcers (ESPN+): Jeff Palermo and Wayde Keiser

Game information

First quarter

- NICH – Jordan Smith 59-yard pass from Ean Rodrigue (Kingston Phan kick), 7:02. Colonels 7–0. Drive: 3 plays, 66 yards, 1:16.
- NICH – Greg Donaldson 74-yard pass from Ean Rodrigue (Kingston Phan kick), 4:51. Colonels 14–0. Drive: 2 plays, 85 yards, 0:30.

Second quarter

- NICH – Kingston Phan 42-yard field goal, 14:55. Colonels 17–0. Drive: 10 plays, 35 yards, 4:08.
- NICH – Tamaj Hoffman 13-yard run (Kingston Phan kick), 5:12. Colonels 24–0. Drive: 7 plays, 72 yards, 3:16.
- NICH – Tamaj Hoffman 7-yard run (Kingston Phan kick), 0:55. Colonels 31–0. Drive: 7 plays, 52 yards, 1:20.
- NICH – Jordan Smith 21-yard pass from Ean Rodrigue (Kingston Phan kick failed), 0:30. Colonels 37–0. Drive: 2 plays, 21 yards, 0:11.

Third quarter

- NICH – Damondrick Blackburn 2-yard run (Wyatt Guidry kick), 9:48. Colonels 44–0. Drive: 10 plays, 39 yards, 4:30.

Fourth quarter

- MVSU – Tyrell Johnson 95-yard interception return (Luka Sari kick), 10:58. Colonels 44–7.
- MVSU – Luka Sari 34-yard field goal, 8:14. Colonels 44–10. Drive: 5 plays, 34 yards, 1:17.

Statistics	MVSU	NICH
First downs	10	26
Plays–yards	52–228	82–515
Rushes–yards	30–149	41–168
Passing yards	79	347
Passing: comp–att–int	12–22–3	25–41–2
Turnovers	6	2
Time of possession	26:15	33:45

Team	Category	Player	Statistics
Mississippi Valley State	Passing	Josh Brown	11/19, 44 yards, 3 INT
Mississippi Valley State	Rushing	Josh Brown	8 carries, 62 yards
Mississippi Valley State	Receiving	Nicholas Buggs	1 reception, 35 yards
Nicholls	Passing	Ean Rodrigue	16/25, 264 yards, 3 TD, INT
Nicholls	Rushing	Tamaj Hoffman	7 carries, 53 yards, 2 TD
Nicholls	Receiving	Greg Donaldson	3 receptions, 100 yards, TD

=== at Sacramento State (FBS) ===
Mississippi Valley State Delta Devils (0–1) at Sacramento State Hornets (FBS) (0–1) – Game summary

Quarter	1	2	3	4	Total
Delta Devils	0	0	0	0	0
Hornets (FBS)	14	17	7	14	52

at Hornet Stadium • Sacramento, California

- Date: September 5
- Game time: 9:00 p.m.
- Game weather: Sunny
- Game attendance: 18,523
- Referee: Chris LaMange
- TV announcers (ESPN+): Will Iger and Mo Hasan

Game information

First quarter

- SAC – Matt Coleman 5-yard pass from Jackson Sharman (Grant Meadors kick), 10:52. Hornets 7–0. Drive: 3 plays, 9 yards, 1:25.
- SAC – Jamar Curtis 1-yard run (Grant Meadors kick), 0:59. Hornets 14–0. Drive: 4 plays, 60 yards, 2:09.

Second quarter

- SAC – Grant Meadors 25-yard field goal, 11:10. Hornets 17–0. Drive: 9 plays, 41 yards, 4:03.
- SAC – Matt Coleman 19-yard pass from Jackson Sharman (Grant Meadors kick), 8:48. Hornets 24–0. Drive: 4 plays, 46 yards, 2:20.
- SAC – Jace Wilson 24-yard pass from Jackson Sharman (Grant Meadors kick), 0:28. Hornets 31–0. Drive: 9 plays, 62 yards, 1:27.

Third quarter

- SAC – Matt Coleman 63-yard pass from Jackson Sharman (Grant Meadors kick), 2:00. Hornets 38–0. Drive: 9 plays, 99 yards, 3:13.

Fourth quarter

- SAC – Jaylen Patterson 43-yard run (Grant Meadors kick), 12:07. Hornets 45–0. Drive: 3 plays, 58 yards, 1:28.
- SAC – Daniel Swinney 3-yard run (Saul Marks kick), 3:21. Hornets 52–0. Drive: 2 plays, 18 yards, 0:44.

Statistics	MVSU	SAC
First downs	6	26
Plays–yards	53–147	70–453
Rushes–yards	34–104	41–203
Passing yards	43	250
Passing: comp–att–int	9–19–0	19–29–1
Turnovers	1	2
Time of possession	26:52	33:08

Team	Category	Player	Statistics
Mississippi Valley State	Passing	Jordon Davis	3/6, 24 yards
Mississippi Valley State	Rushing	Dezmond Ray	3 carries, 36 yards
Mississippi Valley State	Receiving	Jackson Hampton	1 reception, 18 yards
Sacramento State	Passing	Jackson Sharman	18/28, 247 yards, 4 TD, INT
Sacramento State	Rushing	Daniel Swinney	8 carries, 58 yards, TD
Sacramento State	Receiving	Matt Coleman	6 receptions, 141 yards, 3 TD

=== vs. Lincoln (PA) (DII, Chicago Football Classic) ===
Lincoln Lions (DII) (0–1) at Mississippi Valley State Delta Devils (0–2) – Game summary

Quarter	1	2	3	4	Total
Lions (DII)	7	0	13	0	20
Delta Devils	7	10	14	0	31

at Soldier Field • Chicago, Illinois

- Date: September 12
- Game time: 3:00 p.m.
- Game weather: Sunny • Temperature: 80 °F (27 °C)
- Game attendance: 34,300
- Referee: Trennis Livingston
- TV: SWAC TV

Game information

First quarter

- (10:57) MVSU – Norman Taylor 3-yard run, Luka Sari kick (Drive: 8 plays, 27 yards, 3:50; Mississippi Valley State 7–0)
- (1:04) LCLN – Allante Stubbs 4-yard pass from Jayden Triplett, Armando Avril kick (Drive: 5 plays, 80 yards, 2:18; Tied 7–7)

Second quarter

- (3:13) MVSU – Nicholas Buggs 30-yard pass from Josh Brown, Luka Sari kick (Drive: 5 plays, 40 yards, 2:57; Mississippi Valley State 14–7)
- (0:00) MVSU – Luka Sari 30-yard field goal (Drive: 4 plays, 13 yards, 0:43; Mississippi Valley State 17–7)

Third quarter

- (11:17) LCLN – Lorenzo Robinson 28-yard pass from Rhyel Miles-eubanks, Armando Avril kick (Drive: 9 plays, 77 yards, 3:39; Mississippi Valley State 17–14)
- (6:10) MVSU – Jaylen King 9-yard pass from Josh Brown, Luka Sari kick (Drive: 9 plays, 48 yards, 4:57; Mississippi Valley State 24–14)
- (1:15) LCLN – Lorenzo Robinson 9-yard run (Drive: 10 plays, 76 yards, 4:43; Mississippi Valley State 24–20)
- (0:24) MVSU – Dayvian Bluitt 79-yard pass from Josh Brown, Luka Sari kick (Drive: 3 plays, 82 yards, 0:43; Mississippi Valley State 31–20)

Fourth quarter

No scoring plays

Statistics	LCLN	MVSU
First downs	22	19
Plays–yards	69–345	64–407
Rushes–yards	36–132	38–147
Passing yards	213	260
Passing: comp–att–int	16–33–0	17–26–1
Turnovers	1	3
Time of possession	28:57	31:03

Team	Category	Player	Statistics
Lincoln (PA)	Passing	Jayden Triplett	13/28, 151 yards, TD
Lincoln (PA)	Rushing	Lorenzo Robinson	19 carries, 118 yards, TD
Lincoln (PA)	Receiving	Kyrie Tyson	5 receptions, 82 yards
Mississippi Valley State	Passing	Josh Brown	14/21, 243 yards, 3 TD, INT
Mississippi Valley State	Rushing	Josh Brown	9 carries, 46 yards
Mississippi Valley State	Receiving	Dayvian Bluitt	4 receptions, 143 yards, TD

=== Delta State (DII) ===
Delta State Statesmen (0–3) at Mississippi Valley State Delta Devils (1–2) – Game summary

Quarter	1	2	3	4	Total
Statesmen (DII)	0	0	14	7	21
Delta Devils	0	3	3	0	6

at Rice–Totten Stadium • Itta Bena, Mississippi

- Date: September 19
- Game time: 6:00 p.m.
- TV: SWAC TV

Game information

First quarter
Second quarter
Third quarter
Fourth quarter

Statistics	DELT	MVSU
First downs	19	12
Plays–yards	64–308	52–201
Rushes–yards	45–189	20–75
Passing yards	95	105
Passing: comp–att–int	12–19–0	16–30–0
Turnovers	1	0
Time of possession	32:56	27:04

Team	Category	Player	Statistics
Delta State	Passing	Emile Picarella	5/6, 61 yards, TD
Delta State	Rushing	Nick Clark	19 carries, 91 yards, TD
Delta State	Receiving	Matt Rozier	3 receptions, 41 yards
Mississippi Valley State	Passing	Josh Brown	16/30, 105 yards
Mississippi Valley State	Rushing	Carter James	5 carries, 34 yards
Mississippi Valley State	Receiving	Dayvian Bluitt	5 receptions, 52 yards

=== at Alabama State ===
Mississippi Valley State Delta Devils (1–3) at Alabama State Hornets (2–1) – Game summary

Quarter	1	2	3	4	Total
Delta Devils	0	0	0	0	0
Hornets	0	0	0	0	0

at ASU Stadium • Montgomery, Alabama

- Date: September 26
- Game time: 5:00 p.m.
- Game attendance: 15,789
- TV announcers (SWAC TV): James Verret (play-by-play), Stan Beckton (analyst) and Faith Daniels (sideline)

Game information

First quarter
Second quarter
Third quarter
Fourth quarter

Statistics	MVSU	ALST
First downs		
Plays–yards		
Rushes–yards		
Passing yards		
Passing: comp–att–int		
Turnovers		
Time of possession		

Team	Category	Player	Statistics
Mississippi Valley State	Passing		
Mississippi Valley State	Rushing		
Mississippi Valley State	Receiving		
Alabama State	Passing		
Alabama State	Rushing		
Alabama State	Receiving		

=== Prairie View A&M ===
Prairie View A&M Panthers (2–3) at Mississippi Valley State Delta Devils (1–4) – Game summary

Quarter	1	2	3	4	Total
Panthers	0	0	0	0	0
Delta Devils	0	0	0	0	0

at Rice–Totten Stadium • Itta Bena, Mississippi

- Date: October 3
- Game time: 2:00 p.m.

Game information

First quarter
Second quarter
Third quarter
Fourth quarter

Statistics	PV	MVSU
First downs		
Plays–yards		
Rushes–yards		
Passing yards		
Passing: comp–att–int		
Turnovers		
Time of possession		

Team	Category	Player	Statistics
Prairie View A&M	Passing		
Prairie View A&M	Rushing		
Prairie View A&M	Receiving		
Mississippi Valley State	Passing		
Mississippi Valley State	Rushing		
Mississippi Valley State	Receiving		

=== at Texas Southern ===
Mississippi Valley State Delta Devils (2–4) at Texas Southern Tigers (1–4) – Game summary

Quarter	1	2	3	4	Total
Delta Devils	0	0	0	0	0
Tigers	0	0	0	0	0

at W.W. Thorne Stadium • Houston, Texas

- Date: October 10

Game information

First quarter
Second quarter
Third quarter
Fourth quarter

Statistics	MVSU	TXSO
First downs		
Plays–yards		
Rushes–yards		
Passing yards		
Passing: comp–att–int		
Turnovers		
Time of possession		

Team	Category	Player	Statistics
Mississippi Valley State	Passing		
Mississippi Valley State	Rushing		
Mississippi Valley State	Receiving		
Texas Southern	Passing		
Texas Southern	Rushing		
Texas Southern	Receiving		

=== Bethune–Cookman ===
Bethune–Cookman Wildcats (3–3) at Mississippi Valley State Delta Devils (3–4) – Game summary

Quarter	1	2	3	4	Total
Wildcats	0	0	0	0	0
Delta Devils	0	0	0	0	0

at Rice–Totten Stadium • Itta Bena, Mississippi

- Date: October 17
- Game time: 2:00 p.m.

Game information

First quarter
Second quarter
Third quarter
Fourth quarter

Statistics	BCU	MVSU
First downs		
Plays–yards		
Rushes–yards		
Passing yards		
Passing: comp–att–int		
Turnovers		
Time of possession		

Team	Category	Player	Statistics
Bethune–Cookman	Passing		
Bethune–Cookman	Rushing		
Bethune–Cookman	Receiving		
Mississippi Valley State	Passing		
Mississippi Valley State	Rushing		
Mississippi Valley State	Receiving		

=== Alcorn State ===
Alcorn State Braves (4–4) at Mississippi Valley State Delta Devils (3–5) – Game summary

Quarter	1	2	3	4	Total
Braves	0	0	0	0	0
Delta Devils	0	0	0	0	0

at Rice–Totten Stadium • Itta Bena, Mississippi

- Date: October 31
- Game time: 2:00 p.m.

Game information

First quarter
Second quarter
Third quarter
Fourth quarter

Statistics	ALCN	MVSU
First downs		
Plays–yards		
Rushes–yards		
Passing yards		
Passing: comp–att–int		
Turnovers		
Time of possession		

Team	Category	Player	Statistics
Alcorn State	Passing		
Alcorn State	Rushing		
Alcorn State	Receiving		
Mississippi Valley State	Passing		
Mississippi Valley State	Rushing		
Mississippi Valley State	Receiving		

=== at Jackson State ===
Mississippi Valley State Delta Devils (3–6) at Jackson State Tigers (6–2) – Game summary

Quarter	1	2	3	4	Total
Delta Devils	0	0	0	0	0
Tigers	0	0	0	0	0

at Mississippi Veterans Memorial Stadium • Jackson, Mississippi

- Date: November 7
- Game time: 2:00 p.m.

Game information

First quarter
Second quarter
Third quarter
Fourth quarter

Statistics	MVSU	JKST
First downs		
Plays–yards		
Rushes–yards		
Passing yards		
Passing: comp–att–int		
Turnovers		
Time of possession		

Team	Category	Player	Statistics
Mississippi Valley State	Passing		
Mississippi Valley State	Rushing		
Mississippi Valley State	Receiving		
Jackson State	Passing		
Jackson State	Rushing		
Jackson State	Receiving		

=== at Florida A&M ===
Mississippi Valley State Delta Devils (3–7) at Florida A&M Rattlers (2–8) – Game summary

Quarter	1	2	3	4	Total
Delta Devils	0	0	0	0	0
Rattlers	0	0	0	0	0

at Bragg Memorial Stadium • Tallahassee, Florida

- Date: November 14
- Game time: 2:00 p.m.

Game information

First quarter
Second quarter
Third quarter
Fourth quarter

Statistics	MVSU	FAMU
First downs		
Plays–yards		
Rushes–yards		
Passing yards		
Passing: comp–att–int		
Turnovers		
Time of possession		

Team	Category	Player	Statistics
Mississippi Valley State	Passing		
Mississippi Valley State	Rushing		
Mississippi Valley State	Receiving		
Florida A&M	Passing		
Florida A&M	Rushing		
Florida A&M	Receiving		

=== Alabama A&M ===
Alabama A&M Bulldogs (8–3) at Mississippi Valley State Delta Devils (3–8) – Game summary

Quarter	1	2	3	4	Total
Bulldogs	0	0	0	0	0
Delta Devils	0	0	0	0	0

at Rice–Totten Stadium • Itta Bena, Mississippi

- Date: November 21
- Game time: 2:00 p.m.

Game information

First quarter
Second quarter
Third quarter
Fourth quarter

Statistics	AAMU	MVSU
First downs		
Plays–yards		
Rushes–yards		
Passing yards		
Passing: comp–att–int		
Turnovers		
Time of possession		

Team	Category	Player	Statistics
Alabama A&M	Passing		
Alabama A&M	Rushing		
Alabama A&M	Receiving		
Mississippi Valley State	Passing		
Mississippi Valley State	Rushing		
Mississippi Valley State	Receiving		
