= 2026 Jackson State Tigers football team =

American college football season

2026 Jackson State Tigers football
- Conference: Southwestern Athletic Conference
- East Division

Ranking
- BCFP: No. 2
- Record: 8–3 (5–3 SWAC)
- Head coach: T. C. Taylor (4th season)
- Co-offensive coordinators: Rip Kirk (2nd season); Manny Ramirez (2nd season)
- Offensive scheme: Spread
- Defensive coordinator: Torenzo Quinn (2nd season)
- Base defense: Multiple 3–4
- Home stadium: Mississippi Veterans Memorial Stadium

2026 Southwestern Athletic Conference football standings
	Conf.			Overall
Team	W		L	W		L
East Division
Alabama A&M x	6	–	2	9	–	3
Jackson State	5	–	3	8	–	3
Alabama State	4	–	4	6	–	5
Florida A&M*	3	–	5	4	–	8
Bethune–Cookman	3	–	5	5	–	7
Mississippi Valley State*	2	–	6	3	–	9
West Division
Prairie View A&M x	6	–	2	7	–	5
Arkansas–Pine Bluff	5	–	3	7	–	4
Southern	4	–	3	6	–	5
Alcorn State	4	–	4	6	–	6
Grambling State	3	–	4	5	–	5
Texas Southern	2	–	6	3	–	8
Championship: December 5, 2026
$ – Conference champion; x – Division champion/co-champions; y – Championship game participant; * – Ineligible for FCS postseason play due to failed academic requirements; As of November 22, 2026; Rankings from STATS Poll

The 2026 Jackson State Tigers football team will represent Jackson State University as a member of the Southwestern Athletic Conference (SWAC) during the 2026 NCAA Division I FCS football season. The Tigers will be led by fourth-year head coach T. C. Taylor and will play their home games at Mississippi Veterans Memorial Stadium in Jackson, Mississippi.

== Schedule ==
Date	Time	Opponent	Rank	Site	TV	Result	Attendance
August 29	7:30 p.m.	at Tennessee State*		FirstBank Stadium; Nashville, TN (John Merritt Classic)	ESPN+	W 26–24	32,467
September 5	6:00 p.m.	Edward Waters*		Mississippi Veterans Memorial Stadium; Jackson, MS	HBCU GO	W 66–14	16,726
September 19	6:00 p.m.	Tuskegee*		Mississippi Veterans Memorial Stadium; Jackson, MS	SWAC TV	W 41–7	12,178
September 26	6:00 p.m.	Southern		Mississippi Veterans Memorial Stadium; Jackson, MS (rivalry)	ESPN	W 35–17	38,973
October 3	4:00 p.m.	vs. Alabama A&M	No. 25	Ladd–Peebles Stadium; Mobile, AL	SWAC TV	W 31–28	7,490
October 10	4:00 p.m.	at Grambling State	No. 22	Eddie G. Robinson Memorial Stadium; Grambling, LA	SWAC TV	L 38–45	15,434
October 17	2:00 p.m.	Florida A&M^{†}		Mississippi Veterans Memorial Stadium; Jackson, MS	ESPN	W 27–17	44,173
October 24	2:00 p.m.	at Bethune–Cookman	No. 24	Daytona Stadium; Daytona Beach, FL	SWAC TV	L 21–24	4,732
November 7	2:00 p.m.	Mississippi Valley State		Mississippi Veterans Memorial Stadium; Jackson, MS	HBCU GO	W 38–7	16,386
November 14	2:00 p.m.	at Alabama State		ASU Stadium; Montgomery, AL	ESPN	L 20–13	20,771
November 21	2:00 p.m.	at Alcorn State		Casem-Spinks Stadium; Lorman, MS (Soul Bowl)	ESPN	W 54–40	22,179
*Non-conference game; ^{†}Homecoming; Rankings from STATS Poll released prior to the game; All times are in Central time

== Rankings ==
Ranking movements Legend: ██ Increase in ranking ██ Decrease in ranking — = Not ranked RV = Received votes т = Tied with team above or below ( ) = First-place votes
	Week														
Poll	Pre	1	2	3	4	5	6	7	8	9	10	11	12	13	Final
STATS	RV	RV	RV	RV	RV	25	22	RV	24	RV	RV	RV	—		
Coaches	RV	RV	RV	RV	RV	23	22	RV	22	RV	RV	22	RV		
Black College Football	3 (4)	3	3т	2	2	2	1 (13)	2	1 (13)	4	3	2 (1)			

== Game summaries ==
=== at Tennessee State ===
Jackson State Tigers (0–0) at Tennessee State Tigers (0–0) – Game summary

Quarter	1	2	3	4	Total
Jackson State	7	3	13	3	26
Tennessee State	7	10	0	7	24

at FirstBank Stadium • Nashville, Tennessee

- Date: August 29
- Game time: 7:30 p.m.
- Game weather: Sunny • Temperature: 88 °F (31 °C) • Wind: SW 1 mph
- Game attendance: 32,467
- Referee: Matt Jones
- TV: ESPN+

Game information

First quarter

- JKST – Jabari Jones 88-yard pass from Jared Lockhart (Andrew Ivaniciuc kick), 7:46. Jackson State 7–0. Drive: 3 plays, 92 yards, 1:16.
- TNST – Brenton Paul 9-yard run (Preston Hurless kick), 2:04. Tied 7–7. Drive: 13 plays, 75 yards, 5:42.

Second quarter

- TNST – Daylin Lee 1-yard run (Preston Hurless kick), 6:49. Tennessee State 14–7. Drive: 10 plays, 80 yards, 4:49.
- TNST – Preston Hurless 45-yard field goal, 1:56. Tennessee State 17–7. Drive: 7 plays, 17 yards, 3:23.
- JKST – Andrew Ivaniciuc 38-yard field goal, 0:26. Tennessee State 17–10. Drive: 9 plays, 24 yards, 1:22.

Third quarter

- JKST – Andrew Ivaniciuc 45-yard field goal, 11:10. Tennessee State 17–13. Drive: 8 plays, 52 yards, 3:42.
- JKST – Emari Matthews 2-yard run (Andrew Ivaniciuc kick), 7:06. Jackson State 20–17. Drive: 10 plays, 60 yards, 3:44.
- JKST – Andrew Ivaniciuc 51-yard field goal, 1:13. Jackson State 23–17. Drive: 7 plays, 33 yards, 2:33.

Fourth quarter

- TNST – Francisco Pratts III 5-yard pass from Daylin Lee (Preston Hurless kick), 8:48. Tennessee State 24–23. Drive: 14 plays, 75 yards, 7:20.
- JKST – Andrew Ivaniciuc 21-yard field goal, 2:31. Jackson State 26–24. Drive: 15 plays, 77 yards, 6:13.

Statistics	JKST	TNST
First downs	22	22
Plays–yards	64–402	74–354
Rushes–yards	38–180	33–89
Passing yards	222	265
Passing: comp–att–int	17–26–0	23–41–0
Turnovers	0	0
Time of possession	26:59	33:01

Team	Category	Player	Statistics
Jackson State	Passing	Jared Lockhart	17/26, 222 yards, TD
Jackson State	Rushing	Nate Blount IV	15 carries, 101 yards
Jackson State	Receiving	Jabari Jones	4 receptions, 117 yards, TD
Tennessee State	Passing	Daylin Lee	23/41, 265 yards, TD
Tennessee State	Rushing	Daylin Lee	13 carries, 40 yards, TD
Tennessee State	Receiving	Jayden Guy	9 receptions, 148 yards

=== Edward Waters (DII) ===
Edward Waters Tigers (DII) (1–0) at Jackson State Tigers (1–0) – Game summary

Quarter	1	2	3	4	Total
Edward Waters (DII)	0	0	7	7	14
Jackson State	14	24	14	14	66

at Mississippi Veterans Memorial Stadium • Jackson, Mississippi

- Date: September 5
- Game time: 6:00 p.m.
- Game weather: Cloudy • Temperature: 88 °F (31 °C) • Wind: S 6 mph
- Game attendance: 16,726
- Referee: Jarvis Walker
- TV: HBCU Go

Game information

First quarter

- JKST – Jency Riley Jr. 12-yard pass from Jared Lockhart (Andrew Ivaniciuc kick), 6:57. Jackson State 7–0. Drive: 7 plays, 97 yards, 2:41.
- JKST – Joanes Fortilien 4-yard pass from Jared Lockhart (Andrew Ivaniciuc kick), 1:46. Jackson State 14–0. Drive: 5 plays, 69 yards, 2:18.

Second quarter

- JKST – Nate Blount IV 8-yard run (Andrew Ivaniciuc kick), 13:34. Jackson State 21–0. Drive: 8 plays, 52 yards, 1:47.
- JKST – Kobe Paul 18-yard pass from Jared Lockhart (Andrew Ivaniciuc kick), 10:22. Jackson State 28–0. Drive: 4 plays, 71 yards, 1:54.
- JKST – Andrew Ivaniciuc 41-yard field goal, 3:57. Jackson State 31–0. Drive: 9 plays, 47 yards, 3:50.
- JKST – Sebastien Saint-Louis 25-yard pass from Jared Lockhart (Andrew Ivaniciuc kick), 1:54. Jackson State 38–0. Drive: 4 plays, 69 yards, 1:14.

Third quarter

- JKST – CJ Tolbert III 0-yard fumble return (Andrew Ivaniciuc kick), 9:34. Jackson State 45–0.
- JKST – Nate Blount IV 7-yard run (Daylen Ortiz kick), 5:11. Jackson State 52–0. Drive: 7 plays, 51 yards, 2:48.
- EAU – Dylan McCarthy 52-yard interception return (Shelby Towkach kick), 0:41. Jackson State 52–7.

Fourth quarter

- JKST – Li'Darius Pryor 2-yard run (Daylen Ortiz kick), 12:27. Jackson State 59–7. Drive: 8 plays, 53 yards, 3:03.
- JKST – Jartavious Smart 7-yard run (Daylen Ortiz kick), 7:09. Jackson State 66–7. Drive: 8 plays, 65 yards, 3:26.
- EAU – Torey Morrison 29-yard run (Shelby Towkach kick), 3:35. Jackson State 66–14. Drive: 7 plays, 52 yards, 3:24.

Statistics	EAU	JKST
First downs	13	32
Plays–yards	59–231	78–704
Rushes–yards	30–48	51–316
Passing yards	183	388
Passing: comp–att–int	13–29–0	17–27–1
Turnovers	0	1
Time of possession	27:26	32:34

Team	Category	Player	Statistics
Edward Waters	Passing	Tavion Faulk	11/26, 157 yards
Edward Waters	Rushing	Torey Morrison	2 carries, 19 yards, TD
Edward Waters	Receiving	Izaiah Jean-Baptiste	4 receptions, 64 yards
Jackson State	Passing	Jared Lockhart	17/25, 388 yards, 4 TD
Jackson State	Rushing	Nate Blount IV	13 carries, 67 yards, 2 TD
Jackson State	Receiving	Nate Rembert	4 receptions, 179 yards

=== Tuskegee (DII) ===
Tuskegee Golden Tigers (DII) (1–1) at Jackson State Tigers (2–0) – Game summary

Quarter	1	2	3	4	Total
Golden Tigers (DII)	0	0	7	0	7
Tigers	0	10	21	10	41

at Mississippi Veterans Memorial Stadium • Jackson, Mississippi

- Date: September 19
- Game time: 6:00 p.m.
- Game weather: Sunny • Temperature: 91 °F (33 °C) • Wind: SE at 3 miles per hour (4.8 km/h)
- Game attendance: 12,178
- Referee: Y.N. Myers III
- TV announcers (SWAC TV): Mo Carter (play-by-play) and Tolly Carr (analyst)

Game information

First quarter

No scoring plays

Second quarter

- (12:22) JKST – Andrew Ivaniciuc 42-yard field goal (Drive: 14 plays, 59 yards, 4:40; Jackson State 3–0)
- (9:51) JKST – Nate Rembert 39-yard pass from Jared Lockhart, Andrew Ivaniciuc kick (Drive: 2 plays, 53 yards, 0:34; Jackson State 10–0)

Third quarter

- (7:49) JKST – Nate Blount IV 15-yard pass from Jared Lockhart, Andrew Ivaniciuc kick (Drive: 8 plays, 71 yards, 3:07; Jackson State 17–0)
- (5:48) JKST – Jaden Lockhart 84-yard pass from Jared Lockhart, Andrew Ivaniciuc kick (Drive: 1 play, 84 yards, 0:11; Jackson State 24–0)
- (4:01) TUSK – Bryson McGrew 17-yard run, Lorcan Ryans kick (Drive: 4 plays, 75 yards, 1:47; Jackson State 24–7)
- (2:35) JKST – Sebastien Saint-Louis 6-yard pass from Jared Lockhart, Andrew Ivaniciuc kick (Drive: 3 plays, 65 yards, 1:19; Jackson State 31–7)

Fourth quarter

- (10:50) JKST – Andrew Ivaniciuc 33-yard field goal (Drive: 5 plays, 27 yards, 2:27; Jackson State 34–7)
- (3:28) JKST – Keith Bass 0-yard fumble recovery, Andrew Ivaniciuc kick (Jackson State 41–7)

Statistics	TUSK	JKST
First downs	13	20
Plays–yards	60–198	64–492
Rushes–yards	34–35	34–116
Passing yards	163	376
Passing: comp–att–int	12–26–1	21–30–0
Turnovers	2	0
Time of possession	31:54	28:06

Team	Category	Player	Statistics
Tuskegee	Passing	Bryson McGrew	12/26, 163 yards, INT
Tuskegee	Rushing	Henry Pullen	9 carries, 29 yards
Tuskegee	Receiving	Preston Parker	3 receptions, 61 yards
Jackson State	Passing	Jared Lockhart	21/30, 376 yards, 4 TD
Jackson State	Rushing	Nate Blount IV	14 carries, 108 yards
Jackson State	Receiving	Jaden Lockhart	4 receptions, 101 yards, TD

=== Southern (rivalry) ===
Southern Jaguars (2–2) at Jackson State Tigers (3–0) – Game summary

Quarter	1	2	3	4	Total
Jaguars	0	0	0	0	0
Tigers	0	0	0	0	0

at Mississippi Veterans Memorial Stadium • Jackson, Mississippi

- Date: September 26
- Game time: 6:00 p.m.
- TV: ESPN

Game information

First quarter
Second quarter
Third quarter
Fourth quarter

Statistics	SOU	JKST
First downs		
Plays–yards		
Rushes–yards		
Passing yards		
Passing: comp–att–int		
Turnovers		
Time of possession		

Team	Category	Player	Statistics
Southern	Passing		
Southern	Rushing		
Southern	Receiving		
Jackson State	Passing		
Jackson State	Rushing		
Jackson State	Receiving		

=== vs. Alabama A&M ===
Alabama A&M Bulldogs (4–1) vs. No. 25 Jackson State Tigers (4–0) – Game summary

Quarter	1	2	3	4	Total
Bulldogs	0	0	0	0	0
No. 25 Tigers	0	0	0	0	0

at Ladd–Peebles Stadium • Mobile, Alabama

- Date: October 3
- Game time: 4:00 p.m.
- TV: SWAC TV

Game information

First quarter
Second quarter
Third quarter
Fourth quarter

Statistics	AAMU	JKST
First downs		
Plays–yards		
Rushes–yards		
Passing yards		
Passing: comp–att–int		
Turnovers		
Time of possession		

Team	Category	Player	Statistics
Alabama A&M	Passing		
Alabama A&M	Rushing		
Alabama A&M	Receiving		
Jackson State	Passing		
Jackson State	Rushing		
Jackson State	Receiving		

=== at Grambling State ===
No. 22 Jackson State Tigers (5–0) at Grambling State Tigers (3–2) – Game summary

Quarter	1	2	3	4	Total
No. 22 Jackson State	0	0	0	0	0
Grambling State	0	0	0	0	0

at Eddie G. Robinson • Grambling, Louisiana

- Date: October 10

Game information

First quarter
Second quarter
Third quarter
Fourth quarter

Statistics	JKST	GRAM
First downs		
Plays–yards		
Rushes–yards		
Passing yards		
Passing: comp–att–int		
Turnovers		
Time of possession		

Team	Category	Player	Statistics
Jackson State	Passing		
Jackson State	Rushing		
Jackson State	Receiving		
Grambling State	Passing		
Grambling State	Rushing		
Grambling State	Receiving		

=== Florida A&M ===
Florida A&M Rattlers (2–4) at Jackson State Tigers (5–1) – Game summary

Quarter	1	2	3	4	Total
Rattlers	0	0	0	0	0
Tigers	0	0	0	0	0

at Mississippi Veterans Memorial Stadium • Jackson, Mississippi

- Date: October 17
- Game time: 2:00 p.m.

Game information

First quarter
Second quarter
Third quarter
Fourth quarter

Statistics	FAMU	JKST
First downs		
Plays–yards		
Rushes–yards		
Passing yards		
Passing: comp–att–int		
Turnovers		
Time of possession		

Team	Category	Player	Statistics
Florida A&M	Passing		
Florida A&M	Rushing		
Florida A&M	Receiving		
Jackson State	Passing		
Jackson State	Rushing		
Jackson State	Receiving		

=== at Bethune–Cookman ===
No. 24 Jackson State Tigers (6–1) at Bethune–Cookman Wildcats (4–3) – Game summary

Quarter	1	2	3	4	Total
No. 24 Tigers	0	0	0	0	0
Wildcats	0	0	0	0	0

at Daytona Stadium • Daytona Beach, Florida

- Date: October 24
- Game time: 2:00 p.m.

Game information

First quarter
Second quarter
Third quarter
Fourth quarter

Statistics	JKST	BCU
First downs		
Plays–yards		
Rushes–yards		
Passing yards		
Passing: comp–att–int		
Turnovers		
Time of possession		

Team	Category	Player	Statistics
Jackson State	Passing		
Jackson State	Rushing		
Jackson State	Receiving		
Bethune–Cookman	Passing		
Bethune–Cookman	Rushing		
Bethune–Cookman	Receiving		

=== Mississippi Valley State ===
Mississippi Valley State Delta Devils (3–6) at Jackson State Tigers (6–2) – Game summary

Quarter	1	2	3	4	Total
Delta Devils	0	0	0	0	0
Tigers	0	0	0	0	0

at Mississippi Veterans Memorial Stadium • Jackson, Mississippi

- Date: November 7
- Game time: 2:00 p.m.

Game information

First quarter
Second quarter
Third quarter
Fourth quarter

Statistics	MVSU	JKST
First downs		
Plays–yards		
Rushes–yards		
Passing yards		
Passing: comp–att–int		
Turnovers		
Time of possession		

Team	Category	Player	Statistics
Mississippi Valley State	Passing		
Mississippi Valley State	Rushing		
Mississippi Valley State	Receiving		
Jackson State	Passing		
Jackson State	Rushing		
Jackson State	Receiving		

=== at Alabama State ===
Jackson State Tigers (720) at Alabama State Hornets (5–4) – Game summary

Quarter	1	2	3	4	Total
Tigers	0	0	0	0	0
Hornets	0	0	0	0	0

at ASU Stadium • Montgomery, Alabama

- Date: November 14
- Game time: 2:00 p.m.

Game information

First quarter
Second quarter
Third quarter
Fourth quarter

Statistics	JKST	ALST
First downs		
Plays–yards		
Rushes–yards		
Passing yards		
Passing: comp–att–int		
Turnovers		
Time of possession		

Team	Category	Player	Statistics
Jackson State	Passing		
Jackson State	Rushing		
Jackson State	Receiving		
Alabama State	Passing		
Alabama State	Rushing		
Alabama State	Receiving		

=== at Alcorn State (Soul Bowl) ===
Jackson State Tigers (7–3) at Alcorn State Braves (6–5) – Game summary

Quarter	1	2	3	4	Total
Tigers	0	0	0	0	0
Braves	0	0	0	0	0

at Casem-Spinks Stadium • Lorman, Mississippi

- Date: November 21
- Game time: 2:00 p.m.

Game information

First quarter
Second quarter
Third quarter
Fourth quarter

Statistics	JKST	ALCN
First downs		
Plays–yards		
Rushes–yards		
Passing yards		
Passing: comp–att–int		
Turnovers		
Time of possession		

Team	Category	Player	Statistics
Jackson State	Passing		
Jackson State	Rushing		
Jackson State	Receiving		
Alcorn State	Passing		
Alcorn State	Rushing		
Alcorn State	Receiving		
