= 2026 Bethune–Cookman Wildcats football team =

American college football season

2026 Bethune–Cookman Wildcats football
- Conference: Southwestern Athletic Conference
- East Division

Ranking
- BCFP: No. 3
- Record: 5–7 (3–5 SWAC)
- Head coach: Raymond Woodie Jr. (4th season; first 11 games); Alvin Wyatt (interim; remainder of season)
- Offensive coordinator: Donte' Pimpleton (2nd season)
- Defensive coordinator: Robert Wimberly (4th season)
- Co-defensive coordinator: Otis Mound (2nd season)
- Home stadium: Daytona Stadium

2026 Southwestern Athletic Conference football standings
	Conf.			Overall
Team	W		L	W		L
East Division
Alabama A&M x	6	–	2	9	–	3
Jackson State	5	–	3	8	–	3
Alabama State	4	–	4	6	–	5
Florida A&M*	3	–	5	4	–	8
Bethune–Cookman	3	–	5	5	–	7
Mississippi Valley State*	2	–	6	3	–	9
West Division
Prairie View A&M x	6	–	2	7	–	5
Arkansas–Pine Bluff	5	–	3	7	–	4
Southern	4	–	3	6	–	5
Alcorn State	4	–	4	6	–	6
Grambling State	3	–	4	5	–	5
Texas Southern	2	–	6	3	–	8
Championship: December 5, 2026
$ – Conference champion; x – Division champion/co-champions; y – Championship game participant; * – Ineligible for FCS postseason play due to failed academic requirements; As of November 22, 2026; Rankings from STATS Poll

The 2026 Bethune–Cookman football team will represent Bethune–Cookman University as a member of the Southwestern Athletic Conference (SWAC) during the 2026 NCAA Division I FCS football season. The Wildcats will be led by fourth-year head coach Raymond Woodie Jr. and will play their home games at Daytona Stadium in Daytona Beach, Florida.

== Schedule ==
Date	Time	Opponent	Site	TV	Result	Attendance
September 3	7:00 p.m.	at UCF*	Acrisure Bounce House; Orlando, FL	ESPN+	L 6–73	43,127
September 12	4:00 p.m.	Stetson*	Daytona Stadium; Daytona Beach, FL	SWAC TV	W 43–18	3,921
September 19	4:00 p.m.	VUL*	Daytona Stadium; Daytona Beach, FL	SWAC TV	W 62–3	10,513
September 26	7:00 p.m.	No. 16 South Carolina State*	Daytona Stadium; Daytona Beach, FL	HBCU GO	L 21–31	4,750
October 3	4:00 p.m.	Alabama State	Daytona Stadium; Daytona Beach, FL	SWAC TV	W 16–10	4,055
October 10	1:00 p.m.	at Alabama A&M	Louis Crews Stadium; Huntsville, AL	SWAC TV	L 17–55	5,153
October 17	3:00 p.m.	at Mississippi Valley State	Rice–Totten Stadium; Itta Bena, MS	SWAC TV	W 34–14	5,732
October 24	3:00 p.m.	No. 24 Jackson State	Daytona Stadium; Daytona Beach, FL	SWAC TV	W 24–21	4,732
October 31	3:00 p.m.	at Arkansas–Pine Bluff	Simmons Bank Field; Pine Bluff, AR	SWAC TV	L 21–62	5,231
November 7	3:00 p.m.	at Southern	A. W. Mumford Stadium; Baton Rouge, LA	SWAC TV	L 17–45	18,631
November 14	1:00 p.m.	Grambling State	Daytona Stadium; Daytona Beach, FL	SWAC TV	L 21–32	5,151
November 21	3:30 p.m.	vs. Florida A&M	Camping World Stadium; Orlando, FL (Florida Classic)	ESPN+	L 14–27	51,345
*Non-conference game; Rankings from STATS Poll released prior to the game; All times are in Eastern time

== Game summaries ==
=== at UCF (FBS) ===
Bethune–Cookman Wildcats (0–0) at UCF Knights (FBS) (0–0) – Game summary

Quarter	1	2	3	4	Total
Wildcats	0	0	0	6	6
Knights (FBS)	21	17	28	7	73

at Acrisure Bounce House • Orlando, Florida

- Date: September 3
- Game time: 7:00 p.m.
- Game weather: 85° F, mostly cloudy
- Game attendance: 43,127
- Referee: Tutashinda Salaam
- TV announcers (ESPN+): Eric Rothman and Doc Holliday
- Gamecast

Game information

First quarter

- UCF – Duke Watson 64-yard run (Will Stone kick), 11:02, Knights 7–0. Drive: 2 plays, 74 yards, 0:30.
- UCF – Jayden Williams 47-yard interception return (Will Stone kick), 10:42, Knights 14–0.
- UCF – Alonza Barnett III 5-yard run (Will Stone kick), 3:11, Knights 21–0. Drive: 11 plays, 85 yards, 4:23.

Second quarter

- UCF – Jonathan Bibbs 23-yard pass from Alonza Barnett III (Will Stone kick), 14:54, Knights 28–0. Drive: 4 plays, 46 yards, 1:01.
- UCF – Will Stone 34-yard field goal, 7:19, Knights 31–0. Drive: 7 plays, 32 yards, 3:26.
- UCF – Landen Chambers 2-yard run (Will Stone kick), 1:50, Knights 38–0. Drive: 6 plays, 37 yards, 2:17.

Third quarter

- UCF – Taevion Swint 27-yard run (Will Stone kick), 13:02, Knights 45–0. Drive: 5 plays, 37 yards, 1:49.
- UCF – Landen Chambers 27-yard run (Will Stone kick), 9:10, Knights 52–0. Drive: 4 plays, 59 yards, 2:17.
- UCF – Caleb Rollerson 9-yard pass from Keyone Jenkins (Will Stone kick), 5:42, Knights 59–0. Drive: 2 plays, 24 yards, 0:53.
- UCF – Agyeman Addae 39-yard run (Will Stone kick), 2:02, Knights 66–0. Drive: 3 plays, 53 yards, 1:29.

Fourth quarter

- UCF – Rocco Marriott 1-yard run (Will Stone kick), 14:56, Knights 73–0. Drive: 3 plays, 39 yards, 0:54.
- BCU – Kobe Stewart 8-yard pass from Joel Morris (no PAT), 0:00, Knights 73–6. Drive: 11 plays, 80 yards, 5:12.

Statistics	BCU	UCF
First downs	9	26
Plays–yards	60–181	60–560
Rushes–yards	40–107	38–360
Passing yards	74	200
Passing: comp–att–int	10–20–1	15–22–1
Turnovers	2	1
Time of possession	31:55	28:05

Team	Category	Player	Statistics
Bethune–Cookman	Passing	Tyler Jefferson	4/10, 55 yards, INT
Bethune–Cookman	Rushing	Isaiah Daniel	10 carries, 65 yards
Bethune–Cookman	Receiving	Rickie Shaw II	4 receptions, 40 yards
UCF	Passing	Alonza Barnett III	11/18, 158 yards, TD, INT
UCF	Rushing	Duke Watson	7 carries, 110 yards, TD
UCF	Receiving	Josh Derry	3 receptions, 45 yards

=== Stetson ===
Stetson Hatters (1–1) at Bethune–Cookman Wildcats (0–1) – Game summary

Quarter	1	2	3	4	Total
Hatters	0	0	0	0	0
Wildcats	0	0	0	0	0

at Daytona Stadium • Daytona Beach, Florida

- Date: September 12
- Game time: 4:00 p.m.

Game information

First quarter
Second quarter
Third quarter
Fourth quarter

Statistics	STET	BCU
First downs		
Plays–yards		
Rushes–yards		
Passing yards		
Passing: comp–att–int		
Turnovers		
Time of possession		

Team	Category	Player	Statistics
Stetson	Passing		
Stetson	Rushing		
Stetson	Receiving		
Bethune–Cookman	Passing		
Bethune–Cookman	Rushing		
Bethune–Cookman	Receiving		

=== VUL (NCCAA) ===
VUL Dragons (NCCAA) (0–3) at Bethune–Cookman Wildcats (1–1) – Game summary

Quarter	1	2	3	4	Total
Dragons (NCCAA)	0	0	0	0	0
Wildcats	0	0	0	0	0

at Daytona Stadium • Daytona Beach, Florida

- Date: September 19
- Game time: 4:00 p.m.

Game information

First quarter
Second quarter
Third quarter
Fourth quarter

Statistics	VUL	BCU
First downs		
Plays–yards		
Rushes–yards		
Passing yards		
Passing: comp–att–int		
Turnovers		
Time of possession		

Team	Category	Player	Statistics
VUL	Passing		
VUL	Rushing		
VUL	Receiving		
Bethune–Cookman	Passing		
Bethune–Cookman	Rushing		
Bethune–Cookman	Receiving		

=== No. 16 South Carolina State ===
No. 16 South Carolina State Bulldogs (0–0) at Bethune–Cookman Wildcats (0–0) – Game summary

Quarter	1	2	3	4	Total
No. 16 Bulldogs	0	0	0	0	0
Wildcats	0	0	0	0	0

at Daytona Stadium • Daytona Beach, Florida

- Date: September 26
- Game time: 7:00 p.m.

Game information

First quarter
Second quarter
Third quarter
Fourth quarter

Statistics	SCST	BCU
First downs		
Plays–yards		
Rushes–yards		
Passing yards		
Passing: comp–att–int		
Turnovers		
Time of possession		

Team	Category	Player	Statistics
South Carolina State	Passing		
South Carolina State	Rushing		
South Carolina State	Receiving		
Bethune–Cookman	Passing		
Bethune–Cookman	Rushing		
Bethune–Cookman	Receiving		

=== Alabama State ===
Alabama State Hornets (3–1) at Bethune–Cookman Wildcats (2–2) – Game summary

Quarter	1	2	3	4	Total
Hornets	0	0	0	0	0
Wildcats	0	0	0	0	0

at Daytona Stadium • Daytona Beach, Florida

- Date: October 3
- Game time: 4:00 p.m.
- TV: SWAC TV

Game information

First quarter
Second quarter
Third quarter
Fourth quarter

Statistics	ALST	BCU
First downs		
Plays–yards		
Rushes–yards		
Passing yards		
Passing: comp–att–int		
Turnovers		
Time of possession		

Team	Category	Player	Statistics
Alabama State	Passing		
Alabama State	Rushing		
Alabama State	Receiving		
Bethune–Cookman	Passing		
Bethune–Cookman	Rushing		
Bethune–Cookman	Receiving		

=== at Alabama A&M ===
Bethune–Cookman Wildcats (3–2) at Alabama A&M Bulldogs (4–2) – Game summary

Quarter	1	2	3	4	Total
Wildcats	0	0	0	0	0
Bulldogs	0	0	0	0	0

at Louis Crews Stadium • Normal, Alabama

- Date: October 10
- Game time: 1:00 p.m.
- TV: SWAC TV

Game information

First quarter
Second quarter
Third quarter
Fourth quarter

Statistics	BCU	AAMU
First downs		
Plays–yards		
Rushes–yards		
Passing yards		
Passing: comp–att–int		
Turnovers		
Time of possession		

Team	Category	Player	Statistics
Bethune–Cookman	Passing		
Bethune–Cookman	Rushing		
Bethune–Cookman	Receiving		
Alabama A&M	Passing		
Alabama A&M	Rushing		
Alabama A&M	Receiving		

=== at Mississippi Valley State ===
Bethune–Cookman Wildcats (3–3) at Mississippi Valley State Delta Devils (3–4) – Game summary

Quarter	1	2	3	4	Total
Wildcats	0	0	0	0	0
Delta Devils	0	0	0	0	0

at Rice–Totten Stadium • Itta Bena, Mississippi

- Date: October 17
- Game time: 3:00 p.m.

Game information

First quarter
Second quarter
Third quarter
Fourth quarter

Statistics	BCU	MVSU
First downs		
Plays–yards		
Rushes–yards		
Passing yards		
Passing: comp–att–int		
Turnovers		
Time of possession		

Team	Category	Player	Statistics
Bethune–Cookman	Passing		
Bethune–Cookman	Rushing		
Bethune–Cookman	Receiving		
Mississippi Valley State	Passing		
Mississippi Valley State	Rushing		
Mississippi Valley State	Receiving		

=== No. 24 Jackson State ===
No. 24 Jackson State Tigers (6–1) at Bethune–Cookman Wildcats (4–3) – Game summary

Quarter	1	2	3	4	Total
No. 24 Tigers	0	0	0	0	0
Wildcats	0	0	0	0	0

at Daytona Stadium • Daytona Beach, Florida

- Date: October 24
- Game time: 3:00 p.m.

Game information

First quarter
Second quarter
Third quarter
Fourth quarter

Statistics	JKST	BCU
First downs		
Plays–yards		
Rushes–yards		
Passing yards		
Passing: comp–att–int		
Turnovers		
Time of possession		

Team	Category	Player	Statistics
Jackson State	Passing		
Jackson State	Rushing		
Jackson State	Receiving		
Bethune–Cookman	Passing		
Bethune–Cookman	Rushing		
Bethune–Cookman	Receiving		

=== at Arkansas–Pine Bluff ===
Bethune–Cookman Wildcats (5–3) at Arkansas–Pine Bluff Golden Lions (4–3) – Game summary

Quarter	1	2	3	4	Total
Wildcats	0	0	0	0	0
Golden Lions	0	0	0	0	0

at Simmons Bank Field • Pine Bluff, Arkansas

- Date: October 31
- Game time: 3:00 p.m.

Game information

First quarter
Second quarter
Third quarter
Fourth quarter

Statistics	BCU	UAPB
First downs		
Plays–yards		
Rushes–yards		
Passing yards		
Passing: comp–att–int		
Turnovers		
Time of possession		

Team	Category	Player	Statistics
Bethune–Cookman	Passing		
Bethune–Cookman	Rushing		
Bethune–Cookman	Receiving		
Arkansas–Pine Bluff	Passing		
Arkansas–Pine Bluff	Rushing		
Arkansas–Pine Bluff	Receiving		

=== at Southern ===
Bethune–Cookman Wildcats (5–4) at Southern Jaguars (4–5) – Game summary

Quarter	1	2	3	4	Total
Wildcats	0	0	0	0	0
Jaguars	0	0	0	0	0

at A.W. Mumford Stadium • Baton Rouge, Louisiana

- Date: November 7
- Game time: 3:00 p.m.

Game information

First quarter
Second quarter
Third quarter
Fourth quarter

Statistics	BCU	SOU
First downs		
Plays–yards		
Rushes–yards		
Passing yards		
Passing: comp–att–int		
Turnovers		
Time of possession		

Team	Category	Player	Statistics
Bethune–Cookman	Passing		
Bethune–Cookman	Rushing		
Bethune–Cookman	Receiving		
Southern	Passing		
Southern	Rushing		
Southern	Receiving		

=== Grambling State ===
Grambling State Tigers (4–5) at Bethune–Cookman Wildcats (5–5) – Game summary

Quarter	1	2	3	4	Total
Tigers	0	0	0	0	0
Wildcats	0	0	0	0	0

at Daytona Stadium • Daytona Beach, Florida

- Date: November 14
- Game time: 1:00 p.m.

Game information

First quarter
Second quarter
Third quarter
Fourth quarter

Statistics	GRAM	BCU
First downs		
Plays–yards		
Rushes–yards		
Passing yards		
Passing: comp–att–int		
Turnovers		
Time of possession		

Team	Category	Player	Statistics
Grambling State	Passing		
Grambling State	Rushing		
Grambling State	Receiving		
Bethune–Cookman	Passing		
Bethune–Cookman	Rushing		
Bethune–Cookman	Receiving		

=== vs. Florida A&M (Florida Classic) ===
Bethune–Cookman Wildcats (5–6) vs. Florida A&M Rattlers (3–8) – Game summary

Quarter	1	2	3	4	Total
Wildcats	0	0	0	0	0
Rattlers	0	0	0	0	0

at Camping World Stadium • Orlando, Florida

- Date: November 21
- Game time: 3:30 p.m.

Game information

First quarter
Second quarter
Third quarter
Fourth quarter

Statistics	BCU	FAMU
First downs		
Plays–yards		
Rushes–yards		
Passing yards		
Passing: comp–att–int		
Turnovers		
Time of possession		

Team	Category	Player	Statistics
Bethune–Cookman	Passing		
Bethune–Cookman	Rushing		
Bethune–Cookman	Receiving		
Florida A&M	Passing		
Florida A&M	Rushing		
Florida A&M	Receiving		
