= 2026 Texas Southern Tigers football team =

American college football season

2026 Texas Southern Tigers football
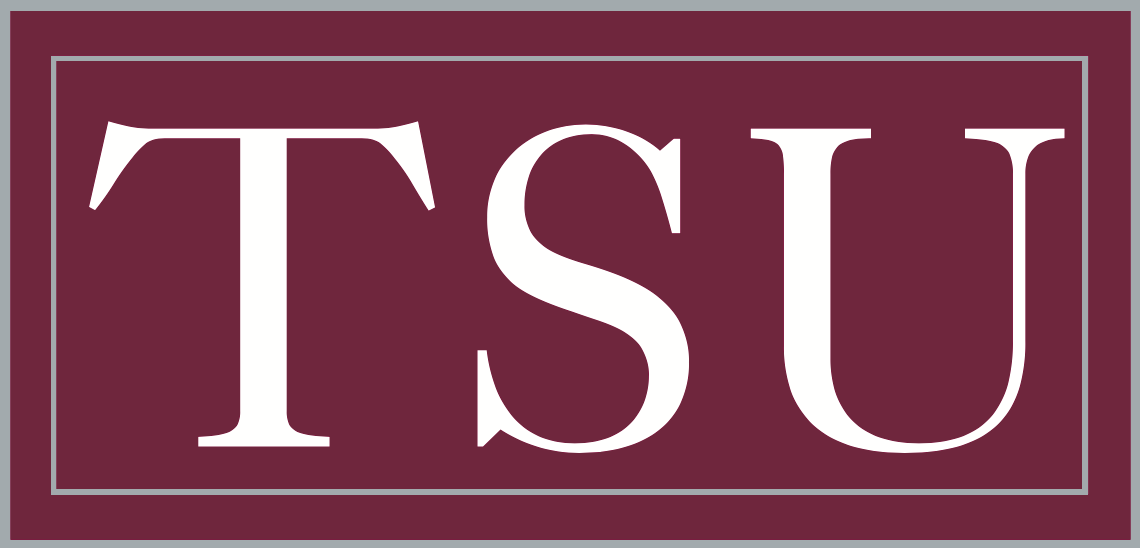
- Conference: Southwestern Athletic Conference
- West Division
- Record: 3–8 (2–6 SWAC)
- Head coach: Cris Dishman (3rd season)
- Offensive coordinator: Steven Smith (3rd season)
- Defensive coordinator: Scott Vestal (1st season)
- Home stadium: W.W. Thorne Stadium

2026 Southwestern Athletic Conference football standings
	Conf.			Overall
Team	W		L	W		L
East Division
Alabama A&M x	6	–	2	9	–	3
Jackson State	5	–	3	8	–	3
Alabama State	4	–	4	6	–	5
Florida A&M*	3	–	5	4	–	8
Bethune–Cookman	3	–	5	5	–	7
Mississippi Valley State*	2	–	6	3	–	9
West Division
Prairie View A&M x	6	–	2	7	–	5
Arkansas–Pine Bluff	5	–	3	7	–	4
Southern	4	–	3	6	–	5
Alcorn State	4	–	4	6	–	6
Grambling State	3	–	4	5	–	5
Texas Southern	2	–	6	3	–	8
Championship: December 5, 2026
$ – Conference champion; x – Division champion/co-champions; y – Championship game participant; * – Ineligible for FCS postseason play due to failed academic requirements; As of November 22, 2026; Rankings from STATS Poll

The 2026 Texas Southern Tigers football team represented Texas Southern University as a member of the Southwestern Athletic Conference (SWAC) during the 2026 NCAA Division I FCS football season. The Tigers were led by third-year head coach Cris Dishman and played their home games at W.W. Thorne Stadium in Houston, Texas.

== Schedule ==
Texas Southern announced their 2026 schedule a month before the first game of the season, due to scheduling conflicts with their home stadium, Shell Energy Stadium.

Date	Time	Opponent	Site	TV	Result	Attendance
August 29	6:00 p.m.	North Carolina Central*	W.W. Thorne Stadium; Houston, TX	HBCU Go	W 42–30	8,931
September 6	11:00 a.m.	at Prairie View A&M	Panther Stadium; Prairie View, TX (Labor Day Classic)	ESPN2	L 14–52	12,546
September 12	8:00 p.m.	at UTEP*	Sun Bowl; El Paso, TX	MW+	L 10–51	24,580
September 26	3:00 p.m.	at Alcorn State	Casem-Spinks Stadium; Lorman, MS	SWAC TV	L 40–43 ^{OT}	9,731
October 3	5:00 p.m.	at Florida Atlantic*	Flagler Credit Union Stadium; Boca Raton, FL	ESPN+	L 10–66	23,736
October 10	2:00 p.m.	Mississippi Valley State	W.W. Thorne Stadium; Houston, TX	SWAC TV	L 34–38	
October 24	2:00 p.m.	Southern^{†}	Reliant Stadium; Houston, TX	SWAC TV	W 24–21	21,523
October 31	7:30 p.m.	Grambling State	W.W. Thorne Stadium; Houston, TX	SWAC TV	W 23–20 ^{OT}	7,115
November 7	2:00 p.m.	Alabama State	W.W. Thorne Stadium; Houston, TX	SWAC TV	L 31–34	5,921
November 14	2:00 p.m.	at Alabama A&M	Louis Crews Stadium; Huntsville, AL	SWAC TV	L 6–35	10,459
November 21	2:00 p.m.	Arkansas–Pine Bluff	W.W. Thorne Stadium; Houston, TX	SWAC TV	L 17–42	3,012
*Non-conference game; ^{†}Homecoming; All times are in Central time

== Game summaries ==
=== North Carolina Central ===
North Carolina Central Eagles (0–0) at Texas Southern Tigers (0–0) – Game summary

Quarter	1	2	3	4	Total
Eagles	14	10	3	3	30
Tigers	0	14	21	7	42

at W.W. Thorne Stadium • Houston, Texas

- Date: August 29
- Game time: 6:00 p.m.
- Game weather: Sunny • Temperature: 94 °F (34 °C) • Wind: SE at 8 miles per hour (13 km/h)
- Game attendance: 8,931
- Referee: Y.N. Myers III
- TV announcers (HBCU Go): James Hadnot, TBA and TBA

Game information

First quarter

- NCCU – Nelson Layne 60-yard run (Riley Daniels kick), 7:16. Eagles 7–0. Drive: 6 plays, 84 yards, 2:59.
- NCCU – Connor Everett 10-yard pass from Nelson Layne (Riley Daniels kick), 0:46. Eagles 14–0. Drive: 8 plays, 63 yards, 3:30.

Second quarter

- TXSO – Jaquan McGee 11-yard pass from Cam'Ron McCoy (Miguel Arana III kick), 11:49. Eagles 14–7. Drive: 9 plays, 93 yards, 3:49.
- NCCU – Nelson Layne 2-yard run (Riley Daniels kick), 4:30. Eagles 21–7. Drive: 14 plays, 85 yards, 7:11.
- TXSO – Jaquan McGee 25-yard pass from Cam'Ron McCoy (Miguel Arana III kick), 0:20. Eagles 21–14. Drive: 6 plays, 77 yards, 1:35.
- NCCU – Riley Daniels 25-yard field goal, 0:00. Eagles 24–14. Drive: 3 plays, 57 yards, 0:20.

Third quarter

- TXSO – Roriyon Richardson 45-yard pass from Cam'Ron McCoy (Miguel Arana III kick), 13:54. Eagles 24–21. Drive: 2 plays, 48 yards, 0:54.
- TXSO – Jordan Thompson 34-yard punt return (Miguel Arana III kick), 9:47. Tigers 28–24.
- NCCU – Riley Daniels 32-yard field goal, 4:35. Tigers 28–27. Drive: 11 plays, 60 yards, 5:12.
- TXSO – Athean Renfro Jr. 14-yard run (Miguel Arana III kick), 2:17. Tigers 35–27. Drive: 5 plays, 74 yards, 2:11.

Fourth quarter

- NCCU – Riley Daniels 37-yard field goal, 12:45. Tigers 35–30. Drive: 4 plays, 1 yard, 1:30.
- TXSO – Jacob Washington 20-yard run (Miguel Arana III kick), 2:07. Tigers 42–30. Drive: 6 plays, 87 yards, 3:16.

Statistics	NCCU	TXSO
First downs	25	19
Plays–yards	73–321	55–462
Rushes–yards	39–190	36–277
Passing yards	131	185
Passing: comp–att–int	16–34–1	8–19–1
Turnovers	1	2
Time of possession	33:16	26:44

Team	Category	Player	Statistics
North Carolina Central	Passing	Nelson Layne	16/31, 131 yards, TD, INT
North Carolina Central	Rushing	Nelson Layne	13 carries, 116 yards, 2 TD
North Carolina Central	Receiving	Rodney Lesane	2 receptions, 36 yards
Texas Southern	Passing	Cam'Ron McCoy	8/19, 185 yards, 3 TD, INT
Texas Southern	Rushing	Athean Renfro Jr.	18 carries, 163 yards, TD
Texas Southern	Receiving	Jaquan McGee	4 receptions, 115 yards, 2 TD

=== at Prairie View A&M (Labor Day Classic) ===
Texas Southern Tigers (1–0) at Prairie View A&M Panthers (0–1) – Game summary

Quarter	1	2	3	4	Total
Tigers	0	7	0	7	14
Panthers	17	0	28	7	52

at Panther Stadium • Prairie View, Texas

- Date: September 6
- Game time: 11:00 a.m.
- Game weather: Sunny
- Game attendance: 12,546
- Referee: Nathan Pinkard
- TV: ESPN2

Game information

First quarter

- PV – Jahbari Kuykendall 90-yard kickoff return (Ethan Eddins kick), 14:45. Panthers 7–0.
- PV – Damien McDaniel 24-yard pass from Tevin Carter (Ethan Eddins kick), 10:32. Panthers 14–0. Drive: 3 plays, 34 yards, 2:03.
- PV – Ethan Eddins 37-yard field goal, 0:36. Panthers 17–0. Drive: 6 plays, 21 yards, 1:26.

Second quarter

- TXSO – Cam'Ron McCoy 17-yard run (Miguel Arana III kick), 11:46. Panthers 17–7. Drive: 7 plays, 75 yards, 3:50.

Third quarter

- PV – Tevin Carter 24-yard run (Ethan Eddins kick), 9:01. Panthers 24–7. Drive: 5 plays, 43 yards, 2:03.
- PV – Travon Jones 39-yard pass from Tevin Carter (Ethan Eddins kick), 6:41. Panthers 31–7. Drive: 2 plays, 53 yards, 0:45.
- PV – Chase Bingmon 46-yard pass from Tevin Carter (Ethan Eddins kick), 3:50. Panthers 38–7. Drive: 2 plays, 59 yards, 0:43.
- PV – Chase Bingmon 2-yard run (Ethan Eddins kick), 1:00. Panthers 45–7. Drive: 4 plays, 46 yards, 1:48.

Fourth quarter

- PV – Travon Jones 2-yard pass from Tevin Carter (Ethan Eddins kick), 10:04. Panthers 52–7. Drive: 7 plays, 57 yards, 1:20.
- TXSO – Ri'Jon Hammond 8-yard run (Miguel Arana III kick), 0:05. Panthers 52–14. Drive: 14 plays, 71 yards, 7:14.

Statistics	TXSO	PV
First downs	21	19
Plays–yards	77–318	54–398
Rushes–yards	50–216	26–160
Passing yards	102	238
Passing: comp–att–int	14–27–0	21–28–0
Turnovers	2	0
Time of possession	40:22	17:35

Team	Category	Player	Statistics
Texas Southern	Passing	Cam'Ron McCoy	10/19, 91 yards
Texas Southern	Rushing	Athean Renfro Jr.	17 carries, 85 yards
Texas Southern	Receiving	Roriyon Richardson	4 receptions, 45 yards
Prairie View A&M	Passing	Tevin Carter	16/22, 217 yards, 4 TD
Prairie View A&M	Rushing	Chase Bingmon	10 carries, 60 yards, TD
Prairie View A&M	Receiving	Rodny Ojo	3 receptions, 68 yards

=== at UTEP (FBS) ===
Texas Southern Tigers (1–1) at UTEP Miners (FBS) (0–1) – Game summary

Quarter	1	2	3	4	Total
Tigers	7	3	0	0	10
Miners (FBS)	7	14	21	9	51

at Sun Bowl • El Paso, Texas

- Date: September 12
- Game time: 8:00 p.m.
- Game weather: Sunny • Temperature: 93 °F (34 °C)
- Game attendance: 24,580
- Referee: Brad Frisby
- TV announcers (MW+): Andy Morgan (play-by-play) and Cole Freytag (analyst)

Game information

First quarter

- UTEP – Kam Thomas 83-yard pass from EJ Colson Jr. (Carlos Arreola kick), 12:32. Miners 7–0. Drive: 1 play, 83 yards, 0:11.
- TXSO – Athean Renfro Jr. 16-yard run (Miguel Arana III kick), 4:55. Tied 7–7. Drive: 12 plays, 75 yards, 7:37.

Second quarter

- TXSO – Miguel Arana III 43-yard field goal, 12:05. Tigers 10–7. Drive: 11 plays, 44 yards, 6:34.
- UTEP – EJ Colson Jr. 3-yard run (Carlos Arreola kick), 5:09. Miners 14–10. Drive: 6 plays, 37 yards, 2:48.
- UTEP – Cash Cheeks 13-yard pass from EJ Colson Jr. (Carlos Arreola kick), 0:37. Miners 21–10. Drive: 7 plays, 38 yards, 1:28.

Third quarter

- UTEP – Cash Cheeks 0-yard fumble recovery (Carlos Arreola kick), 12:04. Miners 28–10. Drive: 8 plays, 75 yards, 2:56.
- UTEP – Carver Cheeks 13-yard pass from EJ Colson Jr. (Carlos Arreola kick), 10:19. Miners 35–10. Drive: 1 play, 13 yards, 0:07.
- UTEP – Tavorus Jones 33-yard run (Carlos Arreola kick), 6:28. Miners 42–10. Drive: 5 plays, 51 yards, 1:58.

Fourth quarter

- UTEP – Carlos Arreola 35-yard field goal, 9:40. Miners 45–10. Drive: 11 plays, 66 yards, 5:49.
- UTEP – Raymond Moore III 79-yard run (Carlos Arreola kick failed), 0:48. Miners 51–10. Drive: 2 plays, 80 yards, 0:52.

Statistics	TXSO	UTEP
First downs	13	21
Plays–yards	62–211	54–491
Rushes–yards	40–112	33–252
Passing yards	99	239
Passing: comp–att–int	13–22–1	14–21–0
Turnovers	2	1
Time of possession	36:36	23:24

Team	Category	Player	Statistics
Texas Southern	Passing	Cam'Ron McCoy	11/17, 85 yards, INT
Texas Southern	Rushing	Athean Renfro Jr.	13 carries, 45 yards, TD
Texas Southern	Receiving	Xavier Phipps	3 receptions, 31 yards
UTEP	Passing	EJ Colson Jr.	14/21, 239 yards, 4 TD
UTEP	Rushing	Tavorus Jones	16 carries, 104 yards, TD
UTEP	Receiving	Kam Thomas	2 receptions, 92 yards, TD

=== at Alcorn State ===
Texas Southern Tigers (1–2) at Alcorn State Braves (2–2) – Game summary

Quarter	1	2	3	4	Total
Tigers	0	0	0	0	0
Braves	0	0	0	0	0

at Casem-Spinks Stadium • Lorman, Mississippi

- Date: September 26
- Game time: 3:00 p.m.
- Game attendance: 9,731
- TV: SWAC TV

Game information

First quarter
Second quarter
Third quarter
Fourth quarter

Statistics	TXSO	ALCN
First downs		
Plays–yards		
Rushes–yards		
Passing yards		
Passing: comp–att–int		
Turnovers		
Time of possession		

Team	Category	Player	Statistics
Texas Southern	Passing		
Texas Southern	Rushing		
Texas Southern	Receiving		
Alcorn State	Passing		
Alcorn State	Rushing		
Alcorn State	Receiving		

=== at Florida Atlantic (FBS) ===
Texas Southern Tigers (1–3) at Florida Atlantic Owls (3–1) – Game summary

Quarter	1	2	3	4	Total
Tigers	0	0	0	0	0
Owls (FBS)	0	0	0	0	0

at Flagler Credit Union Stadium • Boca Raton, Florida

- Date: October 3
- Game time: 5:00 p.m.
- TV: ESPN+

Game information

First quarter
Second quarter
Third quarter
Fourth quarter

Statistics	TXSO	FAU
First downs		
Plays–yards		
Rushes–yards		
Passing yards		
Passing: comp–att–int		
Turnovers		
Time of possession		

Team	Category	Player	Statistics
Texas Southern	Passing		
Texas Southern	Rushing		
Texas Southern	Receiving		
Florida Atlantic	Passing		
Florida Atlantic	Rushing		
Florida Atlantic	Receiving		

=== Mississippi Valley State ===
Mississippi Valley State Delta Devils (2–4) at Texas Southern Tigers (1–4) – Game summary

Quarter	1	2	3	4	Total
Delta Devils	0	0	0	0	0
Tigers	0	0	0	0	0

at W.W. Thorne Stadium • Houston, Texas

- Date: October 10

Game information

First quarter
Second quarter
Third quarter
Fourth quarter

Statistics	MVSU	TXSO
First downs		
Plays–yards		
Rushes–yards		
Passing yards		
Passing: comp–att–int		
Turnovers		
Time of possession		

Team	Category	Player	Statistics
Mississippi Valley State	Passing		
Mississippi Valley State	Rushing		
Mississippi Valley State	Receiving		
Texas Southern	Passing		
Texas Southern	Rushing		
Texas Southern	Receiving		

=== Southern ===
Southern Jaguars (3–4) at Texas Southern Tigers (1–5) – Game summary

Quarter	1	2	3	4	Total
Jaguars	0	0	0	0	0
Tigers	0	0	0	0	0

at Reliant Stadium • Houston, Texas

- Date: October 24

Game information

First quarter
Second quarter
Third quarter
Fourth quarter

Statistics	SOU	TXSO
First downs		
Plays–yards		
Rushes–yards		
Passing yards		
Passing: comp–att–int		
Turnovers		
Time of possession		

Team	Category	Player	Statistics
Southern	Passing		
Southern	Rushing		
Southern	Receiving		
Texas Southern	Passing		
Texas Southern	Rushing		
Texas Southern	Receiving		

=== Grambling State ===
Grambling State Tigers (4–3) at Texas Southern Tigers (2–5) – Game summary

Quarter	1	2	3	4	Total
Grambling State	0	0	0	0	0
Texas Southern	0	0	0	0	0

at W.W. Thorne Stadium • Houston, Texas

- Date: October 31

Game information

First quarter
Second quarter
Third quarter
Fourth quarter

Statistics	GRAM	TXSO
First downs		
Plays–yards		
Rushes–yards		
Passing yards		
Passing: comp–att–int		
Turnovers		
Time of possession		

Team	Category	Player	Statistics
Grambling State	Passing		
Grambling State	Rushing		
Grambling State	Receiving		
Texas Southern	Passing		
Texas Southern	Rushing		
Texas Southern	Receiving		

=== Alabama State ===
Alabama State Hornets (4–4) at Texas Southern Tigers (3–5) – Game summary

Quarter	1	2	3	4	Total
Hornets	0	0	0	0	0
Tigers	0	0	0	0	0

at W.W. Thorne Stadium • Houston, Texas

- Date: November 7

Game information

First quarter
Second quarter
Third quarter
Fourth quarter

Statistics	ALST	TXSO
First downs		
Plays–yards		
Rushes–yards		
Passing yards		
Passing: comp–att–int		
Turnovers		
Time of possession		

Team	Category	Player	Statistics
Alabama State	Passing		
Alabama State	Rushing		
Alabama State	Receiving		
Texas Southern	Passing		
Texas Southern	Rushing		
Texas Southern	Receiving		

=== at Alabama A&M ===
Texas Southern Tigers (3–6) at Alabama A&M Bulldogs (7–3) – Game summary

Quarter	1	2	3	4	Total
Tigers	0	0	0	0	0
Bulldogs	0	0	0	0	0

at Louis Crews Stadium • Normal, Alabama

- Date: November 14
- Game time: 2:00 p.m.

Game information

First quarter
Second quarter
Third quarter
Fourth quarter

Statistics	TXSO	AAMU
First downs		
Plays–yards		
Rushes–yards		
Passing yards		
Passing: comp–att–int		
Turnovers		
Time of possession		

Team	Category	Player	Statistics
Texas Southern	Passing		
Texas Southern	Rushing		
Texas Southern	Receiving		
Alabama A&M	Passing		
Alabama A&M	Rushing		
Alabama A&M	Receiving		

=== Arkansas–Pine Bluff ===
Arkansas–Pine Bluff Golden Lions (6–4) at Texas Southern Tigers (3–7) – Game summary

Quarter	1	2	3	4	Total
Golden Lions	0	0	0	0	0
Tigers	0	0	0	0	0

at W.W. Thorne Stadium • Houston, Texas

- Date: November 21
- Game time: 2:00 p.m.

Game information

First quarter
Second quarter
Third quarter
Fourth quarter

Statistics	UAPB	TXSO
First downs		
Plays–yards		
Rushes–yards		
Passing yards		
Passing: comp–att–int		
Turnovers		
Time of possession		

Team	Category	Player	Statistics
Arkansas–Pine Bluff	Passing		
Arkansas–Pine Bluff	Rushing		
Arkansas–Pine Bluff	Receiving		
Texas Southern	Passing		
Texas Southern	Rushing		
Texas Southern	Receiving		
