= 2026 Alabama State Hornets football team =

American college football season

2026 Alabama State Hornets football
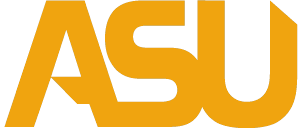
- Conference: Southwestern Athletic Conference
- East Division

Ranking
- BCFP: No. 9
- Record: 6–5 (4–4 SWAC)
- Head coach: Eddie Robinson Jr. (5th season)
- Offensive coordinator: Tony Hull (1st season)
- Co-defensive coordinators: Billy Gresham (2nd season); Todd Middleton (2nd season)
- Home stadium: ASU Stadium

2026 Southwestern Athletic Conference football standings
	Conf.			Overall
Team	W		L	W		L
East Division
Alabama A&M x	6	–	2	9	–	3
Jackson State	5	–	3	8	–	3
Alabama State	4	–	4	6	–	5
Florida A&M*	3	–	5	4	–	8
Bethune–Cookman	3	–	5	5	–	7
Mississippi Valley State*	2	–	6	3	–	9
West Division
Prairie View A&M x	6	–	2	7	–	5
Arkansas–Pine Bluff	5	–	3	7	–	4
Southern	4	–	3	6	–	5
Alcorn State	4	–	4	6	–	6
Grambling State	3	–	4	5	–	5
Texas Southern	2	–	6	3	–	8
Championship: December 5, 2026
$ – Conference champion; x – Division champion/co-champions; y – Championship game participant; * – Ineligible for FCS postseason play due to failed academic requirements; As of November 22, 2026; Rankings from STATS Poll

The 2026 Alabama State Hornets football team will represent Alabama State University as a member of the Southwestern Athletic Conference (SWAC) during the 2026 NCAA Division I FCS football season. The Hornets will be led by fifth-year head coach Eddie Robinson Jr. and will play their home games at ASU Stadium in Montgomery, Alabama.

== Schedule ==
Date	Time	Opponent	Site	TV	Result	Attendance
August 29	2:00 p.m.	vs. Southern (Note: The game against Southern, a fellow member of the SWAC, is a non-conference game and not count in the league standings.)*	Legion Field; Birmingham, AL (Birmingham Football Classic)	ESPNU	W 30–17	31,287
September 5	5:00 p.m.	Lane*	ASU Stadium; Montgomery, AL	SWAC TV	W 34–0	18,678
September 12	3:00 p.m.	at Troy*	Veterans Memorial Stadium; Troy, AL	ESPN+	L 17–34	26,634
September 26	5:00 p.m.	Mississippi Valley State	ASU Stadium; Montgomery, AL	SWAC TV	W 41–15	15,789
October 3	3:00 p.m.	at Bethune–Cookman	Daytona Stadium; Daytona Beach, FL	SWAC TV	L 10–16	4,055
October 9	11:00 a.m.	Florida A&M^{†}	ASU Stadium; Montgomery, AL	SWAC TV	L 27–28	16,994
October 17	2:00 p.m.	at Arkansas–Pine Bluff	Simmons Bank Field; Pine Bluff, AR	SWAC TV	W 21–15	
October 31	2:30 p.m.	vs. Alabama A&M	Legion Field; Birmingham, AL (Magic City Classic)	ESPN+	L 28–31	69,384
November 7	2:00 p.m.	at Texas Southern	W.W. Thorne Stadium; Houston, TX	SWAC TV	W 34–31	5,921
November 14	2:00 p.m.	Jackson State	ASU Stadium; Montgomery, AL	ESPN	W 20–13	20,771
November 21	2:00 p.m.	Prairie View A&M	ASU Stadium; Montgomery, AL	ESPN	L 10–45	14,344
November 26	2:00 p.m.	Tuskegee*	ASU Stadium; Montgomery, AL (Turkey Day Classic)	SWAC TV		
*Non-conference game; ^{†}Homecoming; All times are in Central time

== Game summaries ==
=== vs. Southern ===
Alabama State Hornets (0–0) vs. Southern Jaguars (0–0) – Game summary

Quarter	1	2	3	4	Total
Hornets	3	10	14	3	30
Jaguars	7	10	0	0	17

at Legion Field • Birmingham, Alabama

- Date: August 29
- Game time: 2:00 p.m.
- Game weather: Cloudy • Temperature: 90 °F (32 °C) • Wind: E at 5 miles per hour (8.0 km/h)
- Game attendance: 31,827
- Referee: Charles Green
- TV announcers (ESPNU): Troy Clardy and Forrest Conoly

Game information

First quarter

- SOU – Mike Franklin 29-yard run (Christopher McKenna kick), 3:25. Jaguars 7–0. Drive: 4 plays, 72 yards, 1:54.
- ALST – Andrew Abu-Akel 44-yard field goal, 1:17. Jaguars 7–3. Drive: 6 plays, 38 yards, 2:08.

Second quarter

- SOU – Christian Johnson 1-yard run (Christopher McKenna kick), 12:52. Jaguars 14–3. Drive: 10 plays, 73 yards, 3:19.
- ALST – Jamarie Hostzclaw 15-yard run (Andrew Abu-Akel kick), 11:51. Jaguars 14–10. Drive: 3 plays, 73 yards, 0:51.
- SOU – Nathan Zimmer 33-yard field goal, 3:03. Jaguars 17–10. Drive: 11 plays, 54 yards, 5:12.
- ALST – Andrew Abu-Akel 33-yard field goal, 0:13. Jaguars 17–13. Drive: 9 plays, 58 yards, 2:50.

Third quarter

- ALST – Jareese Howard 3-yard run (Andrew Abu-Akel kick), 5:30. Hornets 20–17. Drive: 7 plays, 52 yards, 3:12.
- ALST – Randall King 9-yard pass from Andrew Body (Andrew Abu-Akel kick), 3:38. Hornets 27–17. Drive: 4 plays, 34 yards, 1:09.

Fourth quarter

- ALST – Andrew Abu-Akel 31-yard field goal, 9:18. Hornets 30–17. Drive: 13 plays, 80 yards, 5:35.

Statistics	ALST	SOU
First downs	19	17
Plays–yards	61–351	67–335
Rushes–yards	38–159	40–161
Passing yards	192	174
Passing: comp–att–int	14–23–0	17–27–1
Turnovers	0	1
Time of possession	28:33	31:27

Team	Category	Player	Statistics
Alabama State	Passing	Andrew Body	14/23, 192 yards, TD
Alabama State	Rushing	Jamarie Hostzclaw	15 carries, 49 yards, TD
Alabama State	Receiving	Randall King	4 receptions, 77 yards, TD
Southern	Passing	Christian Johnson	17/27, 174 yards, INT
Southern	Rushing	Christian Johnson	14 carries, 81 yards, TD
Southern	Receiving	Daejawn Smith	4 receptions, 76 yards

=== Lane (DII) ===
Lane Dragons (DII) (0–1) at Alabama State Hornets (1–0) – Game summary

Quarter	1	2	3	4	Total
Dragons (DII)	0	0	0	0	0
Hornets	7	13	0	14	34

at ASU Stadium • Montgomery, Alabama

- Date: September 5
- Game time: 5:00 p.m.
- Game weather: Cloudy • Temperature: 86 °F (30 °C) • Wind: SE at 5 miles per hour (8.0 km/h)
- Game attendance: 18,678
- Referee: James Crowell
- TV: SWAC TV

Game information

First quarter

- ALST – Jamarie Hostzclaw 6-yard run (Andrew Abu-Akel kick), 5:52. Hornets 7–0. Drive: 9 plays, 70 yards, 3:31.

Second quarter

- ALST – Andrew Abu-Akel 21-yard field goal, 7:20. Hornets 10–0. Drive: 4 plays, 7 yards, 1:47.
- ALST – TJ Ramsey 20-yard pass from Andrew Body (Andrew Abu-Akel kick), 2:54. Hornets 17–0. Drive: 4 plays, 25 yards, 1:49.
- ALST – Andrew Abu-Akel 43-yard field goal, 0:38. Hornets 20–0. Drive: 6 plays, 14 yards, 1:08.

Third quarter

- No scoring plays.

Fourth quarter

- ALST – Jareese Howard 4-yard run (Andrew Abu-Akel kick), 13:59. Hornets 27–0. Drive: 1 play, 4 yards, 0:06.
- ALST – Ashton Ashford 4-yard run (Andrew Abu-Akel kick), 3:26. Hornets 34–0. Drive: 10 plays, 53 yards, 4:49.

Statistics	LANE	ALST
First downs	14	13
Plays–yards	60–182	53–278
Rushes–yards	45–89	36–150
Passing yards	93	128
Passing: comp–att–int	9–15–1	11–17–1
Turnovers	2	1
Time of possession	36:49	23:11

Team	Category	Player	Statistics
Lane	Passing	Crishon Overton	9/15, 93 yards, INT
Lane	Rushing	Makhi Watson	13 carries, 45 yards
Lane	Receiving	Tametrius Pogue	2 receptions, 29 yards
Alabama State	Passing	Andrew Body	10/14, 113 yards, TD, INT
Alabama State	Rushing	Jamarie Hostzclaw	7 carries, 40 yards, TD
Alabama State	Receiving	John Austin	1 reception, 32 yards

=== at Troy (FBS) ===
Alabama State Hornets (2–0) at Troy Trojans (FBS) (1–0) – Game summary

Quarter	1	2	3	4	Total
Hornets	7	0	10	0	17
Trojans (FBS)	14	17	3	0	34

at Veterans Memorial Stadium • Troy, Alabama

- Date: September 12
- Game time: 3:00 p.m.
- Game weather: Cloudy • Temperature: 86 °F (30 °C) • Wind: SW at 7 mph
- Game attendance: 26,634
- Referee: Scott Broadway
- TV announcers (ESPN+): Will Kollmeyer, Ben Stanfield, Rosie Langello and Gavan Baxley

Game information

First quarter

- TROY – TK Keyes 73-yard pass from Goose Crowder (Ethan Head kick), 13:25. Trojans 7–0. Drive: 3 plays, 90 yards, 1:31.
- ALST – Jamarie Hostzclaw 50-yard run (Andrew Abu-Akel kick), 10:51. Tied 7–7. Drive: 6 plays, 81 yards, 2:27.
- TROY – Jaheim Merriweather 69-yard run (Ethan Head kick), 5:56. Trojans 14–7. Drive: 1 play, 69 yards, 0:14.

Second quarter

- TROY – Ethan Head 24-yard field goal, 11:52. Trojans 17–7. Drive: 12 plays, 49 yards, 6:32.
- TROY – Jaheim Merriweather 6-yard run (Ethan Head kick), 3:41. Trojans 24–7. Drive: 10 plays, 61 yards, 4:55.
- TROY – Jaheim Merriweather 1-yard run (Ethan Head kick), 0:15. Trojans 31–7. Drive: 4 plays, 42 yards, 0:52.

Third quarter

- ALST – John Austin 19-yard pass from Andrew Body (Andrew Abu-Akel kick), 11:33. Trojans 31–14. Drive: 2 plays, 34 yards, 0:36.
- ALST – Andrew Abu-Akel 37-yard field goal, 8:41. Trojans 31–17. Drive: 5 plays, 10 yards, 1:56.
- TROY – Ethan Head 47-yard field goal, 5:00. Trojans 34–17. Drive: 10 plays, 35 yards, 3:33.

Fourth quarter

- No scoring plays.

Statistics	ALST	TROY
First downs	15	19
Plays–yards	58–221	68–417
Rushes–yards	34–116	39–226
Passing yards	105	201
Passing: comp–att–int	13–24–0	14–29–0
Turnovers	1	0
Time of possession	27:05	32:55

Team	Category	Player	Statistics
Alabama State	Passing	Andrew Body	13/23, 105 yards, TD
Alabama State	Rushing	Jamarie Hostzclaw	12 carries, 80 yards, TD
Alabama State	Receiving	Franck Pierre	1 reception, 27 yards
Troy	Passing	Goose Crowder	14/27, 201 yards, TD
Troy	Rushing	Jaheim Merriweather	13 carries, 127 yards, 3 TD
Troy	Receiving	TK Keyes	5 receptions, 119 yards, TD

=== Mississippi Valley State ===
Mississippi Valley State Delta Devils (1–3) at Alabama State Hornets (2–1) – Game summary

Quarter	1	2	3	4	Total
Delta Devils	0	0	0	0	0
Hornets	0	0	0	0	0

at ASU Stadium • Montgomery, Alabama

- Date: September 26
- Game time: 5:00 p.m.
- Game attendance: 15,789
- TV announcers (SWAC TV): James Verret (play-by-play), Stan Beckton (analyst) and Faith Daniels (sideline)

Game information

First quarter
Second quarter
Third quarter
Fourth quarter

Statistics	MVSU	ALST
First downs		
Plays–yards		
Rushes–yards		
Passing yards		
Passing: comp–att–int		
Turnovers		
Time of possession		

Team	Category	Player	Statistics
Mississippi Valley State	Passing		
Mississippi Valley State	Rushing		
Mississippi Valley State	Receiving		
Alabama State	Passing		
Alabama State	Rushing		
Alabama State	Receiving		

=== at Bethune–Cookman ===
Alabama State Hornets (3–1) at Bethune–Cookman Wildcats (2–2) – Game summary

Quarter	1	2	3	4	Total
Hornets	0	0	0	0	0
Wildcats	0	0	0	0	0

at Daytona Stadium • Daytona Beach, Florida

- Date: October 3
- Game time: 3:00 p.m.
- TV: SWAC TV

Game information

First quarter
Second quarter
Third quarter
Fourth quarter

Statistics	ALST	BCU
First downs		
Plays–yards		
Rushes–yards		
Passing yards		
Passing: comp–att–int		
Turnovers		
Time of possession		

Team	Category	Player	Statistics
Alabama State	Passing		
Alabama State	Rushing		
Alabama State	Receiving		
Bethune–Cookman	Passing		
Bethune–Cookman	Rushing		
Bethune–Cookman	Receiving		

=== Florida A&M ===
Florida A&M Rattlers (1–4) at Alabama State Hornets (3–2) – Game summary

Quarter	1	2	3	4	Total
Rattlers	0	0	0	0	0
Hornets	0	0	0	0	0

at ASU Stadium • Montgomery, Alabama

- Date: October 9
- Game time: 11:00 a.m.
- TV: SWAC TV

Game information

First quarter
Second quarter
Third quarter
Fourth quarter

Statistics	FAMU	ALST
First downs		
Plays–yards		
Rushes–yards		
Passing yards		
Passing: comp–att–int		
Turnovers		
Time of possession		

Team	Category	Player	Statistics
Florida A&M	Passing		
Florida A&M	Rushing		
Florida A&M	Receiving		
Alabama State	Passing		
Alabama State	Rushing		
Alabama State	Receiving		

=== at Arkansas–Pine Bluff ===
Alabama State Hornets (3–3) at Arkansas–Pine Bluff Golden Lions (3–2) – Game summary

Quarter	1	2	3	4	Total
Hornets	0	0	0	0	0
Golden Lions	0	0	0	0	0

at Simmons Bank Field • Pine Bluff, Arkansas

- Date: October 17
- Game time: 2:00 p.m.

Game information

First quarter
Second quarter
Third quarter
Fourth quarter

Statistics	ALST	UAPB
First downs		
Plays–yards		
Rushes–yards		
Passing yards		
Passing: comp–att–int		
Turnovers		
Time of possession		

Team	Category	Player	Statistics
Alabama State	Passing		
Alabama State	Rushing		
Alabama State	Receiving		
Arkansas–Pine Bluff	Passing		
Arkansas–Pine Bluff	Rushing		
Arkansas–Pine Bluff	Receiving		

=== vs. Alabama A&M (Magic City Classic) ===
Alabama State Hornets (4–3) vs. Alabama A&M Bulldogs (6–2) – Game summary

Quarter	1	2	3	4	Total
Hornets	0	0	0	0	0
Bulldogs	0	0	0	0	0

at Legion Field • Birmingham, Alabama

- Date: October 31
- Game time: 2:30 p.m.

Game information

First quarter
Second quarter
Third quarter
Fourth quarter

Statistics	ALST	AAMU
First downs		
Plays–yards		
Rushes–yards		
Passing yards		
Passing: comp–att–int		
Turnovers		
Time of possession		

Team	Category	Player	Statistics
Alabama State	Passing		
Alabama State	Rushing		
Alabama State	Receiving		
Alabama A&M	Passing		
Alabama A&M	Rushing		
Alabama A&M	Receiving		

=== at Texas Southern ===
Alabama State Hornets (4–4) at Texas Southern Tigers (3–5) – Game summary

Quarter	1	2	3	4	Total
Hornets	0	0	0	0	0
Tigers	0	0	0	0	0

at W.W. Thorne Stadium • Houston, Texas

- Date: November 7

Game information

First quarter
Second quarter
Third quarter
Fourth quarter

Statistics	ALST	TXSO
First downs		
Plays–yards		
Rushes–yards		
Passing yards		
Passing: comp–att–int		
Turnovers		
Time of possession		

Team	Category	Player	Statistics
Alabama State	Passing		
Alabama State	Rushing		
Alabama State	Receiving		
Texas Southern	Passing		
Texas Southern	Rushing		
Texas Southern	Receiving		

=== Jackson State ===
Jackson State Tigers (7–2) at Alabama State Hornets (5–4) – Game summary

Quarter	1	2	3	4	Total
Tigers	0	0	0	0	0
Hornets	0	0	0	0	0

at ASU Stadium • Montgomery, Alabama

- Date: November 14
- Game time: 2:00 p.m.

Game information

First quarter
Second quarter
Third quarter
Fourth quarter

Statistics	JKST	ALST
First downs		
Plays–yards		
Rushes–yards		
Passing yards		
Passing: comp–att–int		
Turnovers		
Time of possession		

Team	Category	Player	Statistics
Jackson State	Passing		
Jackson State	Rushing		
Jackson State	Receiving		
Alabama State	Passing		
Alabama State	Rushing		
Alabama State	Receiving		

=== Prairie View A&M ===
Prairie View A&M Panthers (6–5) at Alabama State Hornets (6–4) – Game summary

Quarter	1	2	3	4	Total
Panthers	0	0	0	0	0
Hornets	0	0	0	0	0

at ASU Stadium • Montgomery, Alabama

- Date: November 21
- Game time: 2:00 p.m.

Game information

First quarter
Second quarter
Third quarter
Fourth quarter

Statistics	PV	ALST
First downs		
Plays–yards		
Rushes–yards		
Passing yards		
Passing: comp–att–int		
Turnovers		
Time of possession		

Team	Category	Player	Statistics
Prairie View A&M	Passing		
Prairie View A&M	Rushing		
Prairie View A&M	Receiving		
Alabama State	Passing		
Alabama State	Rushing		
Alabama State	Receiving		

=== Tuskegee (DII, Turkey Day Classic) ===
Tuskegee Golden Tigers (0–0) at Alabama State Hornets (0–0) – Game summary

Quarter	1	2	3	4	Total
Golden Tigers (DII)	0	0	0	0	0
Hornets	0	0	0	0	0

at ASU Stadium • Montgomery, Alabama

- Date: November 26
- Game time: 2:00 p.m.

Game information

First quarter
Second quarter
Third quarter
Fourth quarter

Statistics	TUSK	ALST
First downs		
Plays–yards		
Rushes–yards		
Passing yards		
Passing: comp–att–int		
Turnovers		
Time of possession		

Team	Category	Player	Statistics
Tuskegee	Passing		
Tuskegee	Rushing		
Tuskegee	Receiving		
Alabama State	Passing		
Alabama State	Rushing		
Alabama State	Receiving		

== Rankings ==
Ranking movements Legend: ██ Increase in ranking ██ Decrease in ranking — = Not ranked RV = Received votes
	Week														
Poll	Pre	1	2	3	4	5	6	7	8	9	10	11	12	13	Final
STATS	RV	RV	RV	RV	RV	RV	—								
Coaches	RV	RV	RV	RV	RV	RV	RV								
