= 2026 Miami Hurricanes football team =

American college football season

2026 Miami Hurricanes football

ACC Championship Game, vs. Wake Forest
- Conference: Atlantic Coast Conference

Ranking
- Coaches: No. 6
- AP: No. 5
- CFP: No. 7
- Record: 10–1 (8–0 ACC)
- Head coach: Mario Cristobal (5th season)
- Offensive coordinator: Shannon Dawson (4th season)
- Offensive scheme: Air raid
- Defensive coordinator: Corey Hetherman (2nd season)
- Base defense: 4–2–5
- Home stadium: Hard Rock Stadium

Uniform
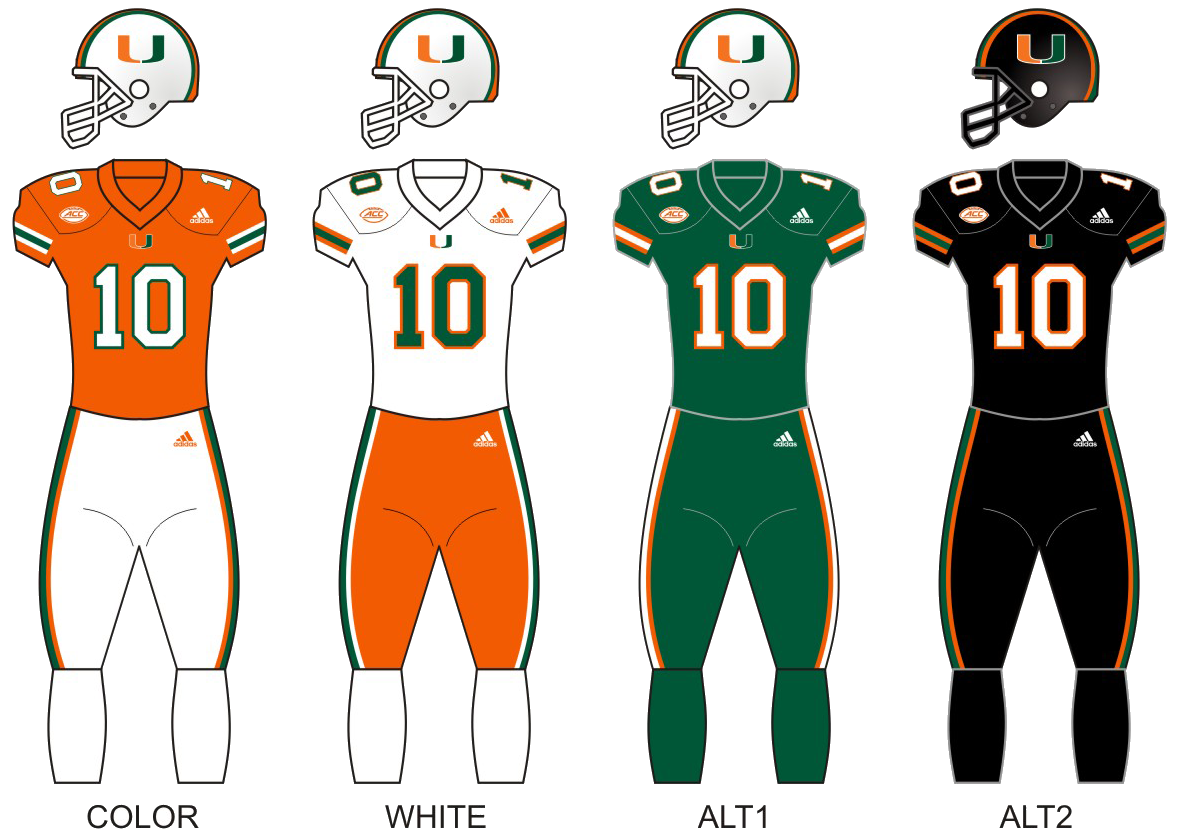

2026 Atlantic Coast Conference football standings
	Conf.			Overall
Team	W		L	W		L
No. 7 Miami (FL) y	8	–	0	10	–	1
No. 11 Wake Forest y	7	–	1	10	–	1
No. 23 Louisville	7	–	2	8	–	3
Clemson	5	–	3	7	–	4
SMU	5	–	3	7	–	4
Duke	4	–	4	7	–	4
Stanford	4	–	4	6	–	5
Virginia	4	–	4	6	–	5
Boston College	3	–	4	5	–	6
Pittsburgh	3	–	5	6	–	5
Virginia Tech	3	–	5	6	–	5
NC State	3	–	5	5	–	6
Florida State	3	–	5	5	–	6
Syracuse	3	–	6	5	–	6
North Carolina	2	–	5	5	–	6
California	2	–	6	3	–	8
Georgia Tech	2	–	6	3	–	8
Championship: Miami (FL) vs. Wake Forest
^ – College Football Playoff participant; $ – Conference champion; y – Championship game participant; As of November 22, 2026; Rankings from CFP rankings

The 2026 Miami Hurricanes football team represents the University of Miami in the Atlantic Coast Conference (ACC) during the 2026 NCAA Division I FBS football season. The Hurricanes are led by Mario Cristobal in his fifth year as head coach. Their home games are played at Hard Rock Stadium located in Miami Gardens, Florida.

== Schedule ==
Date	Time	Opponent	Rank	Site	TV	Result	Attendance
September 4	9:00 p.m.	at Stanford	No. 7	Stanford Stadium; Stanford, CA	ESPN	W 45–6	37,648
September 10	8:00 p.m.	Florida A&M*	No. 7	Hard Rock Stadium; Miami Gardens, FL	ACCN	W 77–7	63,618
September 18	7:30 p.m.	at Wake Forest	No. 5	Allegacy Federal Credit Union Stadium; Winston-Salem, NC	ESPN	W 33–20	32,147
September 26	6:30 p.m.	Central Michigan*	No. 6	Hard Rock Stadium; Miami Gardens, FL	The CW	W 52–3	65,338
October 3	7:30 p.m.	at Clemson	No. 4	Memorial Stadium; Clemson, SC	ABC	W 41–13	80,463
October 17	7:00 p.m.	Florida State	No. 3	Hard Rock Stadium; Miami Gardens, FL (rivalry)	ESPN	W 43–35 ^{2OT}	66,790
October 24	12:00 p.m.	Pittsburgh	No. 1	Hard Rock Stadium; Miami Gardens, FL	ESPN	W 52–23	65,991
October 31	7:30 p.m.	at North Carolina	No. 1	Kenan Stadium; Chapel Hill, NC	ABC	W 38–35	44,257
November 7	7:30 p.m.	at No. 11 Notre Dame*	No. 1	Notre Dame Stadium; Notre Dame, IN (rivalry / College GameDay)	NBC	L 24–31	77,622
November 14	12:00 p.m.	Duke	No. 7	Hard Rock Stadium; Miami Gardens, FL	ABC	W 36–25	66,618
November 21	7:00 p.m.	Virginia Tech	No. 7	Hard Rock Stadium; Miami Gardens, FL (rivalry / College GameDay)	ESPN	W 28–20	66,790
November 28	12:00 p.m.	Boston College		Hard Rock Stadium; Miami Gardens, FL	ESPN		
December 5	12:00 p.m.	vs. Wake Forest		Bank of America Stadium; Charlotte, NC (ACC Championship Game)	ABC		
*Non-conference game; Rankings from AP Poll (and CFP Rankings, after November 3) - Released prior to game; All times are in Eastern time

== Rankings ==
Ranking movements Legend: ██ Increase in ranking ██ Decrease in ranking ( ) = First-place votes
	Week															
Poll	Pre	1	2	3	4	5	6	7	8	9	10	11	12	13	14	Final
AP	7 (1)	7 (1)	5 (4)	6 (1)	4 (1)	4 (2)	3 (2)	1 (40)	1 (59)	1 (62)	5	5				
Coaches	7	7	5 (2)	5 (1)	4	4	3 (1)	1 (50)	1 (67)	1 (68)	6	6				
CFP	Not released									1	7	7				Not released

== Personnel ==
=== Coaching staff ===
Name	Title
Mario Cristobal	Head coach
Shannon Dawson	Offensive coordinator/quarterbacks coach
Corey Hetherman	Defensive coordinator/linebackers coach
Alex Mirabal	Assistant head coach/offensive line coach
Kevin Beard	Wide receivers coach
Will Harris	Safeties coach
Damione Lewis	Defensive tackles coach
Jason Taylor	Defensive line coach
Favian Upshaw	Running backs coach
Mike Viti	Tight ends coach
Danny Kalter	Special teams coordinator
Todd Stroud	Senior football advisor

=== Roster ===
2026 Miami Hurricanes football team roster
Players
Coaches
Offense

Pos.	#	Name	Class
RB	0	Girard Pringle Jr.	So
WR	1	Malachi Toney	So
RB	2	Jordan Lyle	Jr
WR	3	Joshua Moore	So
RB	4	Mark Fletcher Jr.	Sr
QB	5	Luke Nickel	Fr
RB	6	CharMar Brown	Jr
WR	7	Daylyn Upshaw	So
WR	8	Vandrevius Jacobs	Jr
TE	9	Elija Lofton	Jr
QB	10	Darian Mensah	Jr
QB	11	Dereon Coleman	Fr
WR	12	Somourian Wingo	Fr
WR	13	Vance Spafford	Fr
TE	14	Israel Briggs	Fr
QB	15	Judd Anderson	So
WR	17	Cam Vaughn	Jr
WR	18	Cooper Barkate	Sr
QB	18	Joe Borchers	Jr
QB	18	Vinny Gonzalez	Fr
WR	19	Milan Parris	Fr
RB	20	Terrell Walden II	Sr
RB	21	Javian Mallory	Fr
RB	25	Chris Wheatley-Humphrey	So
WR	33	Nick Thomas	So
RB	35	Jack Whitehouse	So
WR	40	Brennan Burton	So
TE	44	Owen Ruskavich	Jr
OL	53	Canon Pickett	Fr
OL	55	JJ Sparks	Fr
OL	56	Johnathan Cline	Jr
OL	57	Rhys Woodrow	Fr
OL	58	Ben Congdon	Fr
OL	63	Samson Okunlola	Jr
OL	64	Ralph Scroggins	Fr
OL	65	Seuseu Alofaituli	So
OL	66	Max Buchanan	So
OL	70	Joel Ervin	Fr
OL	71	Jamal Meriweather	Jr
OL	72	Demetrius Campbell	Fr
OL	73	Jaden Wilkerson	Fr
OL	74	Yerovi Valdes Alfonso	So
OL	76	Ryan Rodriguez	Sr
OL	77	Juan Minaya	So
OL	78	Matthew McCoy	Sr
OL	79	Jackson Cantwell	Fr
TE	80	Hunter Carver	So
QB	81	Riply Luna	Jr
TE	82	Dylan Reiman	So
WR	83	Tyran Evans	Fr
TE	84	Jack Nickel	Sr
TE	85	Jackson Carver	Jr
WR	86	Kolby Luna	Jr
TE	87	Gavin Mueller	Fr
TE	88	Luka Gilbert	So
TE	89	Cole McConathy II	So

Defense

Pos.	#	Name	Class
DB	0	Omar Thornton	Jr
LB	1	Mohamed Toure	GS
DB	2	Damari Brown	Jr
DB	3	Bryce Fitzgerald	So
DL	5	Justin Scott	Jr
DB	6	Xavier Lucas	Jr
DB	7	Zechariah Poyser	Jr
DL	8	Marquise Lightfoot	Jr
LB	9	Chase Smith	Sr
DL	10	Damon Wilson II	Sr
LB	11	Kamal Bonner	Jr
DL	13	Asharri Charles	Fr
DL	14	Hayden Lowe	Fr
DB	15	Brody Jennings	Fr
DB	16	Ja'Boree Antoine	So
LB	17	Ezekiel Marcelin Jr.	So
DL	18	Armondo Blount	Jr
DB	19	Jaelen Waters	Fr
DB	20	Chris Ewald Jr.	Fr
DB	21	Camdin Portis	Fr
LB	22	Cam Pruitt	Jr
DB	23	Dylan Day	Jr
DB	24	Ethan O'Connor	Jr
DB	25	JJ Dunnigan	Fr
DB	27	Ryan Mack	So
DB	28	Isaiah Taylor	GS
DB	29	OJ Frederique Jr.	Jr
LB	30	Kellen Wiley Jr.	So
DL	31	Herbert Scroggins III	So
LB	32	Justin "JJ" Edwards	Fr
DL	33	Booker Pickett	So
LB	34	Jordan Campbell	Fr
DB	35	Monroe Ingraham	Jr
DB	36	Jontavius Wyman	Fr
DB	37	Cortez Redding	Fr
DB	38	Conrad Hussey	Sr
LB	39	Casey Rizzi	So
DL	40	Keshawn Stancil	Fr
DL	42	Logan Nagle	Fr
DB	43	Tyler Rowe	Sr
DL	44	Tyson Bacon	Fr
LB	45	Braylon Lamar	Jr
DB	47	Stone Stroud	So
DB	48	Andres Williams	So
DL	52	Isaac Chukwurah	Fr
DL	55	Mykah Newton	Fr
DL	88	DeAnthony Lafayette	Fr
DL	91	Jarquez Carter	So
DL	92	Samuel Coufal	Jr
DL	93	Fred Sainteus	Fr
DL	97	Keona Davis	Jr
DL	99	Ahmad Moten Sr.	Sr

Special teams

Pos.	#	Name	Class
K	22	Jake Weinberg	So
LS	46	Adam Booker	Sr
K	82	Jack Olsen	Sr
P	94	Dylan Joyce	Sr
P	96	Tucker Tevepaugh	So
K	97	Will Rocha	Jr

Head coach

- Mario Cristobal

Coordinators/assistant coaches

- Shannon Dawson – Offensive Coordinator/Quarterbacks
- Corey Hetherman – Defensive Coordinator/Linebackers
- Alex Mirabal – Assistant Head Coach/Offensive Line
- Kevin Beard – Wide Receivers
- Will Harris – Safeties
- Damione Lewis – Defensive Tackles
- Jason Taylor – Defensive Line
- Favian Upshaw – Running Backs
- Mike Viti – Tight Ends
- Danny Kalter – Special Teams Coordinator

Legend

- (C) Team captain
- (S) Suspended
- (I) Ineligible
- Injured
- Redshirt

Roster
Last update: May 31, 2026

=== Depth chart ===
Defense

NB
0 Omar Thornton
28 Isaiah Taylor
21 Camdin Portis

FS
7 Zechariah Poyser
25 JJ Dunnigan
⋅

WLB	MLB
1 Mohamed Toure	9 Chase Smith
4 Cam Pruitt	11 Kamal Bonner
⋅	30 Kellen Wiley Jr.

SS
3 Bryce Fitzgerald
38 Conrad Hussey
23 Dylan Day

CB
29 OJ Frederique Jr.
2 Damari Brown
20 Chris Ewald Jr.

DE	DT	DT	DE
10 Damon Wilson II	99 Ahmad Moten Sr.	5 Justin Scott	8 Marquise Lightfoot
31 Herbert Scroggins III	91 Carter Jaquez	97 Keona Davis	18 Armondo Blount
33 Booker Picket Jr.	⋅	⋅	14 Hayden Lowe

CB
24 Ethan O'Connor
6 Xavier Lucas
16 Ja'Boree Antoine

Offense

WR
7 Daylyn Upshaw
8 Vandrevius Jacobs
83 Tyran Evans

WR
1 Malachi Toney (injured)
13 Vance Spafford
⋅

LT	LG	C	RG	RT
63 Samson Okunlola	58 Ben Congdon	76 Ryan Rodriguez	65 Seuseu Alofaituli	78 Matthew McCoy
79 Jackson Cantwell	⋅	57 Rhys Woodrow	66 Max Buchanan (injured)	71 Jamal Meriweather
⋅	⋅	⋅	⋅	⋅

TE
9 Elija Lofton
87 Gavin Mueller
14 Israel Briggs
44 Owen Ruskavich

WR
18 Cooper Barkate
12 Somourian Wingo
19 Milan Parris

QB
10 Darian Mensah
5 Luke Nickel
11 Dereon Coleman
15 Judd Anderson

Key reserves
Out (season)
TE 88 Luka Gilbert (injured)
RB 6 CharMar Brown (injured)
WR 3 Joshua Moore (injured)

Special teams
PK 22 Jake Weinberg
P 94 Dylan Joyce
KR 0 Girard Pringle Jr. or
12 Somourian Wingo
PR 1 Malachi Toney or
12 Somourian Wingo
LS 46 Adam Booker
H 94 Dylan Joyce

RB
4 Mark Fletcher Jr.
21 Javian Mallory
2 Jordan Lyle
0 Girard Pringle Jr.

== Game summaries ==
=== at Stanford ===
No. 7 Miami Hurricanes (0–0) at Stanford Cardinal (1–0) – Game summary

Quarter	1	2	3	4	Total
No. 7 Hurricanes	14	14	14	3	45
Cardinal	3	3	0	0	6

at Stanford Stadium • Stanford, California

- Date: September 4
- Game time: 9:00 p.m. EDT
- Game weather: Sunny • Temperature: 73 °F (23 °C) • Wind: 0 miles per hour (0 km/h)
- Game attendance: 37,648
- TV announcers (ESPN): Mike Monaco, Jordan Rodgers, and Dana Boyle

Game information

First quarter

- MIA – Malachi Toney 23-yard pass from Darian Mensah (Jake Weinberg kick), 12:07. Hurricanes 7–0. Drive: 4 plays, 77 yards, 1:40.
- STAN – Emmet Kenney 30-yard field goal, 7:57. Hurricanes 7–3. Drive: 10 plays, 63 yards, 4:10.
- MIA – Malachi Toney 2-yard pass from Darian Mensah (Jake Weinberg kick), 2:53. Hurricanes 14–3. Drive: 10 plays, 75 yards, 4:58.

Second quarter

- MIA – CharMar Brown 5-yard run (Jake Weinberg kick), 7:52. Hurricanes 21–3. Drive: 8 plays, 89 yards, 3:56.
- MIA – Daylen Upshaw 5-yard pass from Darian Mensah (Jake Weinberg kick), 1:55. Hurricanes 28–3. Drive: 11 plays, 65 yards, 4:50.
- STAN – Emmet Kenney 24-yard field goal, 0:27. Hurricanes 28–6. Drive: 12 plays, 69 yards, 1:28.

Third quarter

- MIA – Cooper Barkate 34-yard pass from Darian Mensah (Jake Weinberg kick), 11:51. Hurricanes 35–6. Drive: 7 plays, 75 yards, 3:09.
- MIA – Malachi Toney 47-yard pass from Darian Mensah (Jake Weinberg kick), 5:24. Hurricanes 42–6. Drive: 8 plays, 87 yards, 3:58.

Fourth quarter

- MIA – Jake Weinberg 46-yard field goal, 1:59. Hurricanes 45–6. Drive: 6 plays, 35 yards, 3:05.

Statistics	MIA	STAN
First downs	27	17
Plays–yards	67–548	65–299
Rushes–yards	32–121	23–78
Passing yards	428	221
Passing: comp–att–int	30–35–1	22–42–0
Turnovers	2	0
Time of possession	36:34	23:26

Team	Category	Player	Statistics
Miami (FL)	Passing	Darian Mensah	27/30, 401 yards, 5 TD
Miami (FL)	Rushing	Mark Fletcher Jr.	13 carries, 40 yards
Miami (FL)	Receiving	Malachi Toney	12 receptions, 234 yards, 3 TD
Stanford	Passing	Davis Warren	21/41, 214 yards
Stanford	Rushing	Sedrick Irvin	6 carries, 41 yards
Stanford	Receiving	Caden High	6 receptions, 92 yards

=== vs. Florida A&M (FCS) ===
Florida A&M Rattlers (FCS) (1–1) at No. 7 Miami Hurricanes (1–0) – Game summary

Quarter	1	2	3	4	Total
Rattlers (FCS)	0	0	0	7	7
No. 7 Hurricanes	21	28	28	0	77

at Hard Rock Stadium • Miami Gardens, Florida

- Date: September 10
- Game time: 8:00 p.m. EDT
- Game weather: Cloudy • Temperature: 83 °F (28 °C) • Wind: E at 2 miles per hour (3.2 km/h)
- Game attendance: 63,618
- Referee: Jon Noli
- TV announcers (ACCN): Mike Corey, Max Starks, and Ian Fitzsimmons

Game information

First quarter

- MIA – Mark Fletcher Jr. 46-yard run (Jake Weinberg kick), 12:37. Hurricanes 7–0. Drive: 3 plays, 59 yards, 0:55.
- MIA – Joshua Moore 55-yard pass from Darian Mensah (Jake Weinberg kick), 11:11. Hurricanes 14–0. Drive: 1 play, 55 yards, 0:08.
- MIA – Mark Fletcher Jr. 1-yard run (Jake Weinberg kick), 6:17. Hurricanes 21–0. Drive: 7 plays, 59 yards, 2:42.

Second quarter

- MIA – Malachi Toney 19-yard pass from Darian Mensah (Jake Weinberg kick), 14:54. Hurricanes 28–0. Drive: 4 plays, 83 yards, 1:33.
- MIA – Girard Pringle Jr. 4-yard run (Jake Weinberg kick), 10:10. Hurricanes 35–0. Drive: 6 plays, 58 yards, 3:15.
- MIA – Cooper Barkate 9-yard pass from Darian Mensah (Jake Weinberg kick), 6:27. Hurricanes 42–0. Drive: 5 plays, 61 yards, 2:01.
- MIA – Javian Mallory 11-yard run (Will Rocha kick), 0:46. Hurricanes 49–0. Drive: 8 plays, 87 yards, 2:31.

Third quarter

- MIA – Somourian Wingo 47-yard pass from Luke Nickel (Will Rocha kick), 12:36. Hurricanes 56–0. Drive: 5 plays, 75 yards, 2:24.
- MIA – Vandrevius Jacobs 33-yard pass from Luke Nickel (Will Rocha kick), 9:54. Hurricanes 63–0. Drive: 3 plays, 75 yards, 1:15.
- MIA – Vance Spafford 21-yard pass from Luke Nickel (Will Rocha kick), 5:49. Hurricanes 70–0. Drive: 6 plays, 61 yards, 3:08.
- MIA – Javian Mallory 52-yard run (Will Rocha kick), 3:31. Hurricanes 77–0. Drive: 2 plays, 55 yards, 0:45.

Fourth quarter

- FAMU – Caleb McKenzie 72-yard fumble return (Gabriel Caison kick), 6:40. Hurricanes 77–7.

Both teams agreed to a ten-minute fourth quarter due to the score.

Statistics	FAMU	MIA
First downs	4	42
Plays–yards	47–107	73–856
Rushes–yards	21–37	44–430
Passing yards	70	426
Passing: comp–att–int	11–26–0	27–29–0
Turnovers	0	1
Time of possession	23:00	37:00

Team	Category	Player	Statistics
Florida A&M	Passing	Armond Parker	3/7, 37 yards
Florida A&M	Rushing	Dustin Fletcher	8 carries, 24 yards
Florida A&M	Receiving	Chase Gillespie	3 receptions, 20 yards
Miami (FL)	Passing	Darian Mensah	14/15, 252 yards, 3 TD
Miami (FL)	Rushing	Javian Mallory	10 carries, 142 yards, 2 TD
Miami (FL)	Receiving	Malachi Toney	4 receptions, 96 yards, TD

=== at Wake Forest ===
No. 5 Miami Hurricanes (2–0) at Wake Forest Demon Deacons (2–0) – Game summary

Quarter	1	2	3	4	Total
No. 5 Hurricanes	7	17	7	2	33
Demon Deacons	7	0	6	7	20

at Allegacy Federal Credit Union Stadium • Winston-Salem, North Carolina

- Date: September 18
- Game time: 7:30 p.m. EDT
- Game weather: Sunny
- Game attendance: 32,147
- Referee: Riley Johnson
- TV announcers (ESPN): Mike Monaco, Jordan Rodgers and Dana Boyle

Statistics	MIA	WAKE
First downs	23	20
Plays–yards	68–378	62–334
Rushes–yards	34–158	16–22
Passing yards	220	312
Passing: comp–att–int	30–34–0	29–46–1
Turnovers	0	1
Time of possession	33:24	26:36

Team	Category	Player	Statistics
Miami (FL)	Passing	Darian Mensah	30/34, 220 yards, 3 TD
Miami (FL)	Rushing	Mark Fletcher Jr.	16 carries, 85 yards, TD
Miami (FL)	Receiving	Malachi Toney	12 receptions, 114 yards, TD
Wake Forest	Passing	Gio Lopez	29/46, 312 yards, 3 TD, INT
Wake Forest	Rushing	Deuce Lawrence	6 carries, 27 yards
Wake Forest	Receiving	Jack Foley	6 receptions, 118 yards, TD

Miami improved to 3–0 overall and 2–0 in ACC play with a 33–20 road victory over Wake Forest. Darian Mensah completed 30 of 34 passes for 220 yards and three touchdowns, setting ACC records for consecutive completions in a game (24) and across multiple games (35), and was subsequently named ACC Quarterback of the Week. The Hurricanes' victory came at a cost, however, as running back CharMar Brown and wide receiver Joshua Moore were both ruled out for the remainder of the season with injuries.

=== vs. Central Michigan ===
Central Michigan Chippewas (2–1) at No. 6 Miami Hurricanes (3–0) – Game summary

Quarter	1	2	3	4	Total
Chippewas	3	0	0	0	3
No. 6 Hurricanes	7	28	7	10	52

at Hard Rock Stadium • Miami Gardens, Florida

- Date: September 26
- Game time: 6:30 p.m. EDT
- Game weather: Sunny • Temperature: 86 °F (30 °C) • Wind: NW at 5 miles per hour (8.0 km/h)
- Game attendance: 65,338
- Referee: Garrett Dickerson
- TV announcers (The CW): Thom Brennaman, Jason Cabinda, and Wes Bryant

Statistics	CMU	MIA
First downs	10	31
Plays–yards	51–158	68–572
Rushes–yards	25–21	34–201
Passing yards	137	371
Passing: comp–att–int	21–26–1	27–34–0
Turnovers	3	0
Time of possession	28:50	31:10

Team	Category	Player	Statistics
Central Michigan	Passing	Jadyn Glasser	13/15, 88 yards, INT
Central Michigan	Rushing	Nick Woodford	6 carries, 21 yards
Central Michigan	Receiving	Tayte Vanderleest	1 reception, 24 yards
Miami (FL)	Passing	Darian Mensah	23/27, 338 yards, 3 TD
Miami (FL)	Rushing	Chris Wheatley-Humphrey	11 carries, 104 yards, TD
Miami (FL)	Receiving	Malachi Toney	6 receptions, 120 yards, TD

=== at Clemson ===
No. 4 Miami Hurricanes (4–0) at Clemson Tigers (3–1) – Game summary

Quarter	1	2	3	4	Total
No. 4 Hurricanes	10	7	7	17	41
Tigers	3	3	0	7	13

at Memorial Stadium • Clemson, South Carolina

- Date: October 3
- Game time: 7:30 p.m. EDT
- Game weather: Cloudy • Temperature: 76 °F (24 °C) • Wind: S at 4 miles per hour (6.4 km/h)
- Game attendance: 80,463
- Referee: Justin Elliott
- TV announcers (ABC): Chris Fowler, Kirk Herbstreit, and Holly Rowe

Statistics	MIA	CLEM
First downs	25	22
Plays–yards	62–419	75–350
Rushes–yards	35–192	31–55
Passing yards	227	295
Passing: comp–att–int	18–27–0	29–44–1
Turnovers	0	2
Time of possession	32:29	27:31

Team	Category	Player	Statistics
Miami (FL)	Passing	Darian Mensah	18/27, 227 yards, TD
Miami (FL)	Rushing	Mark Fletcher Jr.	16 carries, 77 yards, 2 TD
Miami (FL)	Receiving	Cooper Barkate	5 receptions, 98 yards, TD
Clemson	Passing	Tait Reynolds	29/44, 295 yards, INT
Clemson	Rushing	Chris Johnson Jr.	5 carries, 32 yards
Clemson	Receiving	Tyler Brown	10 receptions, 76 yards

=== vs. Florida State (rivalry) ===
Florida State Seminoles (3–3) at No. 3 Miami Hurricanes (5–0) – Game summary

Quarter	1	2	3	4	OT	2OT	Total
Seminoles	0	14	7	7	7	0	35
No. 3 Hurricanes	7	7	0	14	7	8	43

at Hard Rock Stadium • Miami Gardens, Florida

- Date: October 17
- Game time: 7:00 p.m. EDT
- Game attendance: 66,790
- TV announcers (ESPN): Tom Hart, Roddy Jones, and Quint Kessenich

Statistics	FSU	MIA
First downs	19	26
Plays–yards	64–443	78–583
Rushes–yards	34–138	44–257
Passing yards	305	326
Passing: comp–att–int	16–30–1	23–34–1
Time of possession	22:40	37:20

Team	Category	Player	Statistics
Florida State	Passing	Ashton Daniels	15/28, 298 yards, 4 TD, INT
Florida State	Rushing	Quintrevion Wisner	9 carries, 63 yards
Florida State	Receiving	Duce Robinson	5 receptions, 113 yards, 2 TD
Miami (FL)	Passing	Darian Mensah	23/34, 326 yards, 3 TD, INT
Miami (FL)	Rushing	Javian Mallory	13 carries, 108 yards, 2 TD
Miami (FL)	Receiving	Malachi Toney	11 receptions, 154 yards, 2 TD

=== vs. Pittsburgh ===
Pittsburgh Panthers (5–2) at No. 1 Miami Hurricanes (6–0) – Game summary

Quarter	1	2	3	4	Total
Panthers	0	7	7	9	23
No. 1 Hurricanes	10	21	14	7	52

at Hard Rock Stadium • Miami Gardens, Florida

- Date: October 24
- Game time: 12:00 p.m. EDT
- Game attendance: 65,991
- TV announcers (ESPN): Bob Wischusen, Louis Riddick, and Stormy Buonantony

Statistics	PITT	MIA
First downs		
Plays–yards		
Rushes–yards		
Passing yards		
Passing: comp–att–int		
Time of possession		

Team	Category	Player	Statistics
Pittsburgh	Passing		
Pittsburgh	Rushing		
Pittsburgh	Receiving		
Miami (FL)	Passing		
Miami (FL)	Rushing		
Miami (FL)	Receiving		

=== at North Carolina ===
No. 1 Miami Hurricanes (7–0) at North Carolina Tar Heels (4–3) – Game summary

Quarter	1	2	3	4	Total
No. 1 Hurricanes	7	10	7	14	38
Tar Heels	0	14	7	14	35

at Kenan Stadium • Chapel Hill, North Carolina

- Date: October 31
- Game time: 7:30 p.m. EDT
- TV announcers (ABC): Sean McDonough, Greg McElroy, and Katie George

Statistics	MIA	UNC
First downs		
Plays–yards		
Rushes–yards		
Passing yards		
Passing: comp–att–int		
Time of possession		

Team	Category	Player	Statistics
Miami (FL)	Passing		
Miami (FL)	Rushing		
Miami (FL)	Receiving		
North Carolina	Passing		
North Carolina	Rushing		
North Carolina	Receiving		

=== at No. 11 Notre Dame ===
No. 1 Miami Hurricanes (8–0) at No. 11 Notre Dame Fighting Irish (7–1) – Game summary

Quarter	1	2	3	4	Total
No. 1 Hurricanes	0	3	14	7	24
No. 11 Fighting Irish	3	14	7	7	31

at Notre Dame Stadium • Notre Dame, Indiana

- Date: November 7
- Game time: 7:30 p.m. EST
- Game weather: Clear, 40 °F (4 °C); Wind: SW 3 miles per hour (4.8 km/h)
- Game attendance: 77,622
- Referee: Riley Johnson
- TV announcers (NBC): Noah Eagle, Todd Blackledge, Kathryn Tappen and Caroline Pineda

Game information

First quarter

- (9:38) ND – Spencer Porath 44 Yd Field Goal (Drive: 12 plays, 50 yards, 5:22; Notre Dame 3–0)

Second quarter

- (14:02) ND – Jordan Faison 27 Yd pass from CJ Carr (Drive: 4 plays, 65 yards, 1:22; Notre Dame 10–0)
- (6:25) MIA – Jake Weinberg 19 Yd Field Goal (Drive: 14 plays, 83 yards, 7:33; Notre Dame 10–3)
- (0:29) ND – Micah Gilbert 18 Yd pass from CJ Carr (Drive: 8 plays, 81 yards, 1:39; Notre Dame 17–3)

Third quarter

- (12:05) ND – Micah Gilbert 20 Yd pass from CJ Carr (Drive: 3 plays, 30 yards, 1:19; Notre Dame 24–3)
- (8:26) MIA – Elija Lofton 12 Yd pass from Darian Mensah (Drive: 11 plays, 65 yards, 3:39; Notre Dame 24–10)
- (5:29) MIA – Cooper Barkate 12 Yd pass from Darian Mensah (Drive: 6 plays, 52 yards, 1:58; Notre Dame 24–17)

Fourth quarter

- (12:55) ND – Nolan James Jr. 1 Yd Run (Drive: 8 plays, 51 yards, 3:49; Notre Dame 31–17)
- (9:53) MIA – Cooper Barkate 1 Yd pass from Darian Mensah (Drive: 7 plays, 75 yards, 3:02; Notre Dame 31–24)

Statistics	MIA	ND
First downs	21	22
Plays–yards	71–403	69–412
Rushes–yards	28–101	29–93
Passing yards	302	319
Passing: comp–att–int	24–43–1	29–40–0
Turnovers	2	0
Time of possession	29:05	30:55

Team	Category	Player	Statistics
Miami (FL)	Passing	Darian Mensah	24/43, 302 yards, 3 TD, INT
Miami (FL)	Rushing	Mark Fletcher Jr.	13 carries, 57 yards
Miami (FL)	Receiving	Cooper Barkate	10 receptions, 118 yards, 2 TD
Notre Dame	Passing	CJ Carr	29/40, 319 yards, 3 TD
Notre Dame	Rushing	Nolan James Jr.	16 carries, 52 yards, TD
Notre Dame	Receiving	Micah Gilbert	9 receptions, 98 yards, 2 TD

=== vs. Duke ===
Duke Blue Devils (7–2) at No. 7 Miami Hurricanes (8–1) – Game summary

Quarter	1	2	3	4	Total
Blue Devils	0	10	7	8	25
No. 7 Hurricanes	0	13	9	14	36

at Hard Rock Stadium • Miami Gardens, Florida

- Date: November 14
- Game time: 12:00 p.m. EST
- TV announcers (ABC): Bob Wischusen, Louis Riddick, and Stormy Buonantony

Statistics	DUKE	MIA
First downs		
Plays–yards		
Rushes–yards		
Passing yards		
Passing: comp–att–int		
Time of possession		

Team	Category	Player	Statistics
Duke	Passing		
Duke	Rushing		
Duke	Receiving		
Miami (FL)	Passing		
Miami (FL)	Rushing		
Miami (FL)	Receiving		

=== vs. Virginia Tech (rivalry) ===
Virginia Tech Hokies (6–4) at No. 7 Miami Hurricanes (9–1) – Game summary

Quarter	1	2	3	4	Total
Hokies	0	0	0	0	0
No. 7 Hurricanes	0	0	0	0	0

at Hard Rock Stadium • Miami Gardens, Florida

- Date: November 20
- Game time: TBD
- TV announcers (ESPN): Tom Hart, Roddy Jones, and Quint Kessenich

Statistics	VT	MIA
First downs		
Plays–yards		
Rushes–yards		
Passing yards		
Passing: comp–att–int		
Time of possession		

Team	Category	Player	Statistics
Virginia Tech	Passing		
Virginia Tech	Rushing		
Virginia Tech	Receiving		
Miami (FL)	Passing		
Miami (FL)	Rushing		
Miami (FL)	Receiving		

=== vs. Boston College ===
Boston College Eagles (5–6) at Miami Hurricanes (10–1) – Game summary

Quarter	1	2	3	4	Total
Eagles	0	0	0	0	0
Hurricanes	0	0	0	0	0

at Hard Rock Stadium • Miami Gardens, Florida

- Date: November 28
- Game time: TBD

Statistics	BC	MIA
First downs		
Plays–yards		
Rushes–yards		
Passing yards		
Passing: comp–att–int		
Time of possession		

Team	Category	Player	Statistics
Boston College	Passing		
Boston College	Rushing		
Boston College	Receiving		
Miami (FL)	Passing		
Miami (FL)	Rushing		
Miami (FL)	Receiving		
