= Slow Burn Theatre =

Theater in Fort Lauderdale, Florida

Slow Burn Theatre Company
- Formation: 2009
- Type: Theatre group
- Location: Fort Lauderdale, Florida
- Artistic director: Patrick Fitzwater
- Website: slowburntheatre.org

"Slow Burn Theatre Company," is an American non-profit, professional theatre located in Fort Lauderdale, Florida, United States. Slow Burn Theatre Company produces a full season of shows and works to further the arts education of students and young adults. Slow Burn Theatre Company works to provide scholarships and intern opportunities to residents of South Florida.

== History ==
The theatre company was originally founded in 2009 by partners Patrick Fitzwater and Matthew Korinko, hoping to specialize in "intelligent lesser-known contemporary musicals". Their first season consisted of Bat Boy: The Musical and Assassins (musical), and was funded by working in a beauty salon and donations. After six seasons performed at West Boca Raton Community High School, Slow Burn moved to the Broward Center for the Performing Arts' Amaturo Theater as the resident theatre company. Until 2014, Slow Burn Theatre had a company objective to hire "only local talent and musicians", before opening to allow Actors' Equity Association artists to perform in main stage productions.

== Productions ==
Slow Burn Theatre Company has staged various award-winning productions and premieres over ten seasons, totaling almost thirty productions since 2010. Slow Burn Theatre gave the regional premieres of shows including Carrie (musical), Freaky Friday (musical), Heathers: The Musical, Hunchback of Notre Dame (musical), and Big Fish (musical). Slow Burn has won various Carbonell awards for its musicals, direction, performance, and technical art. Slow Burn Theatre Company receives favorable reviews from numerous journalistic outlets, ranging from Broadway World's international coverage, to local publications such as The Palm Beach Post, Sun Sentinel, Florida Theatre On Stage, and Miami Herald.
