= Rich Alexis =

American football player (born 1981)

No. 40, 33, 24, 32
- Position: Running back

Personal information
- Born: May 6, 1981 (age 45); Boynton Beach, Florida, U.S.
- Listed height: 6 ft 0 in (1.83 m)
- Listed weight: 225 lb (102 kg)

Career information
- High school: Boca Raton (FL) Pope John Paul II
- College: Washington
- NFL draft: 2004: undrafted

Career history
- Jacksonville Jaguars (2004–2006); St. Louis Rams (2006–2007); New York Sentinels (2009)*
- * Offseason or practice squad member only

Career NFL statistics
- Rushing attempts: 3
- Rushing yards: 5
- Return yards: 31
- Stats at Pro Football Reference

Richard Alexis (born May 6, 1981) is an American former professional football player who was a running back in the National Football League (NFL). He played college football for the Washington Huskies and was signed by the Jacksonville Jaguars as an undrafted free agent in 2004.

Alexis was also a member of the St. Louis Rams and New York Sentinels.

Alexis has been the RB coach at West Boca Raton High School since 2022. He is coaching his two nephews, Mason and Javian Mallory, who are on the team.

Alexis’ son Jaden Alexis is a WR for South Florida.

== See also ==
- Washington Huskies football statistical leaders
