= 2026 Florida A&M Rattlers football team =

American college football season

2026 Florida A&M Rattlers football
- Conference: Southwestern Athletic Conference
- East Division
- Record: 4–8 (3–5 SWAC)
- Head coach: Quinn Gray (1st season)
- Co-offensive coordinator: Nicholas Sewak (1st season)
- Offensive scheme: Spread
- Defensive coordinator: Ryan Lewis (1st season)
- Base defense: Multiple 3–4
- Home stadium: Bragg Memorial Stadium

2026 Southwestern Athletic Conference football standings
	Conf.			Overall
Team	W		L	W		L
East Division
Alabama A&M x	6	–	2	9	–	3
Jackson State	5	–	3	8	–	3
Alabama State	4	–	4	6	–	5
Florida A&M*	3	–	5	4	–	8
Bethune–Cookman	3	–	5	5	–	7
Mississippi Valley State*	2	–	6	3	–	9
West Division
Prairie View A&M x	6	–	2	7	–	5
Arkansas–Pine Bluff	5	–	3	7	–	4
Southern	4	–	3	6	–	5
Alcorn State	4	–	4	6	–	6
Grambling State	3	–	4	5	–	5
Texas Southern	2	–	6	3	–	8
Championship: December 5, 2026
$ – Conference champion; x – Division champion/co-champions; y – Championship game participant; * – Ineligible for FCS postseason play due to failed academic requirements; As of November 22, 2026; Rankings from STATS Poll

The 2026 Florida A&M Rattlers football team represents Florida A&M University as a member of the Southwestern Athletic Conference (SWAC) during the 2026 NCAA Division I FCS football season. The Rattlers are led by first-year head coach Quinn Gray and play their home games at Bragg Memorial Stadium in Tallahassee, Florida.

The Rattlers will be ineligible for postseason play, regardless of finish, due to having an insufficient Academic Progress Rate (APR) over the previous three years.

== Schedule ==
Date	Time	Opponent	Site	TV	Result	Attendance
August 29	7:00 p.m.	No. 21 (DII) Albany State*	Bragg Memorial Stadium; Tallahassee, FL	SWAC TV	W 20–7	14,047
September 6	3:00 p.m.	vs. No. 21 South Carolina State*	Hard Rock Stadium; Miami Gardens, FL (Orange Blossom Classic)	ESPN	L 13–31	23,188
September 10	8:00 p.m.	at No. 7 (FBS) Miami (FL)*	Hard Rock Stadium; Miami Gardens, FL	ACCN	L 7–77	63,618
September 19	7:00 p.m.	Tennessee State*	Bragg Memorial Stadium; Tallahassee, FL	HBCU GO	L 26–29	12,399
September 26	7:00 p.m.	Alabama A&M	Bragg Memorial Stadium; Tallahassee, FL	SWAC TV	L 21–40	11,380
October 9	12:00 p.m.	at Alabama State	ASU Stadium; Montgomery, AL	SWAC TV	W 28–27	16,994
October 17	3:00 p.m.	at Jackson State	Mississippi Veterans Memorial Stadium; Jackson, MS	ESPN	L 17–27	44,173
October 24	3:00 p.m.	Arkansas–Pine Bluff^{†}	Bragg Memorial Stadium; Tallahassee, FL	HBCU GO	L 28–31	20,549
October 31	3:00 p.m.	Southern	Bragg Memorial Stadium; Tallahassee, FL	HBCU GO	L 14–42	10,224
November 7	3:00 p.m.	at Alcorn State	Casem-Spinks Stadium; Lorman, MS	SWAC TV	L 20–38	3,922
November 14	3:00 p.m.	Mississippi Valley State	Bragg Memorial Stadium; Tallahassee, FL	SWAC TV	W 16–13	7,002
November 21	3:30 p.m.	vs. Bethune–Cookman	Camping World Stadium; Orlando, FL (Florida Classic)	ESPN+	W 27–14	51,345
*Non-conference game; ^{†}Homecoming; Rankings from STATS Poll released prior to the game; All times are in Eastern time

== Game summaries ==
=== No. 21 (DII) Albany State ===
No. 21 (DII) Albany State Golden Rams (0–0) at Florida A&M Rattlers (0–0) – Game summary

Quarter	1	2	3	4	Total
No. 21 (DII) Golden Rams	0	0	0	7	7
Rattlers	7	0	3	10	20

at Bragg Memorial Stadium • Tallahassee, Florida

- Date: August 29
- Game time: 7:00 p.m.
- Game weather: Sunny
- Game attendance: 14,047
- Referee: Trennis Livingston
- TV announcers (SWAC TV): Jared Oliver and Vaughn Wilson

Game information

First quarter

- FAMU – Jaquan Lee 2-yard pass from Isaiah Knowles (Emilio Bacardi kick), 4:26. Rattlers 7–0. Drive: 14 plays, 76 yards, 5:23.

Second quarter

- No scoring plays.

Third quarter

- FAMU – Emilio Bacardi 17-yard field goal, 4:37. Rattlers 10–0. Drive: 9 plays, 68 yards, 4:04.

Fourth quarter

- FAMU – Gabriel Caison 37-yard field goal, 12:29. Rattlers 13–0. Drive: 4 plays, -11 yards, 1:21.
- FAMU – Chase Gillespie 9-yard run (Emilio Bacardi kick), 8:48. Rattlers 20–0. Drive: 5 plays, 61 yards, 2:07.
- ALBS – Exavior Sherrod 7-yard pass from Vinson Berry (Jonathan Rodriguez kick), 4:20. Rattlers 20–7. Drive: 11 plays, 74 yards, 4:20.

Statistics	ALBS	FAMU
First downs	15	15
Plays–yards	59–163	57–260
Rushes–yards	37–3	32–70
Passing yards	160	190
Passing: comp–att–int	14–22–0	14–25–0
Turnovers	1	0
Time of possession	34:29	25:31

Team	Category	Player	Statistics
Albany State	Passing	JD Davis II	9/12, 122 yards
Albany State	Rushing	Jayden Threatts	8 carries, 24 yards
Albany State	Receiving	Jaquan Graham	5 receptions, 83 yards
Florida A&M	Passing	Isaiah Knowles	14/23, 190 yards, TD
Florida A&M	Rushing	Jamal Hailey	16 carries, 54 yards
Florida A&M	Receiving	Maliek Denmark	2 receptions, 62 yards

=== vs. No. 21 South Carolina State (Orange Blossom Classic) ===
No. 21 South Carolina State Bulldogs (1–0) vs. Florida A&M Rattlers (1–0) – Game summary

Quarter	1	2	3	4	Total
No. 21 Bulldogs	14	7	7	3	31
Rattlers	3	3	7	0	13

at Hard Rock Stadium • Miami Gardens, Florida

- Date: September 6
- Game time: 3:00 p.m.
- Game weather: Cloudy • Temperature: 76 °F (24 °C) • Wind: SW at 6 miles per hour (9.7 km/h)
- Game attendance: 23,188
- Referee: Y.N. Myers III
- TV announcers (ESPN): Tiffany Greene, Jay Walker, and Cameron Wolfe

Game information

First quarter

- FAMU – Emilio Bacardi 30-yard field goal, 7:50. Rattlers 3–0. Drive: 14 plays, 62 yards, 7:10.
- SCST – Mason Pickett-Hicks 58-yard run (Jett Jackson kick), 7:17. Bulldogs 7–3. Drive: 2 plays, 57 yards, 0:28.
- SCST – Josh Shaw 6-yard run (Jett Jackson kick), 7:04. Bulldogs 14–3. Drive: 1 play, 21 yards, 0:05.

Second quarter

- FAMU – Emilio Bacardi 31-yard field goal, 7:23. Bulldogs 14–6. Drive: 10 plays, 69 yards, 4:59.
- SCST – Josh Shaw 1-yard run (Jett Jackson kick), 3:31. Bulldogs 21–6. Drive: 7 plays, 75 yards, 3:52.

Third quarter

- SCST – Mason Pickett-Hicks 32-yard run (Jett Jackson kick), 13:24. Bulldogs 28–6. Drive: 4 plays, 75 yards, 1:36.
- FAMU – Justin Bostic 80-yard interception return (Emilio Bacardi kick), 6:07. Bulldogs 28–13.

Fourth quarter

- SCST – Jett Jackson 39-yard field goal, 1:09. Bulldogs 31–13. Drive: 6 plays, 25 yards, 3:15.

Statistics	SCST	FAMU
First downs	19	10
Plays–yards	58–479	60–161
Rushes–yards	38–292	30–(-1)
Passing yards	187	162
Passing: comp–att–int	12–20–2	13–30–0
Turnovers	3	1
Time of possession	30:13	29:47

Team	Category	Player	Statistics
South Carolina State	Passing	Keely Watson	10/17, 168 yards, 2 INT
South Carolina State	Rushing	Mason Pickett-Hicks	17 carries, 210 yards, 2 TD
South Carolina State	Receiving	Malaqhi Jones	6 receptions, 72 yards
Florida A&M	Passing	Isaiah Knowles	7/22, 94 yards
Florida A&M	Rushing	Jamal Hailey	11 carries, 13 yards
Florida A&M	Receiving	Kieren Jackson	4 receptions, 69 yards

=== at No. 7 (FBS) Miami (FL) ===
Florida A&M Rattlers (1–1) at No. 7 (FBS) Miami Hurricanes (1–0) – Game summary

Quarter	1	2	3	4	Total
Rattlers	0	0	0	7	7
No. 7 (FBS) Hurricanes	21	28	28	0	77

at Hard Rock Stadium • Miami Gardens, Florida

- Date: September 10
- Game time: 8:00 p.m.
- Game weather: Cloudy • Temperature: 83 °F (28 °C) • Wind: E at 2 miles per hour (3.2 km/h)
- Game attendance: 63,618
- Referee: Jon Noli
- TV announcers (ACCN): Mike Corey, Max Starks, and Ian Fitzsimmons

Game information

First quarter

- MIA – Mark Fletcher Jr. 46-yard run (Jake Weinberg kick), 12:37. Hurricanes 7–0. Drive: 3 plays, 59 yards, 0:55.
- MIA – Joshua Moore 55-yard pass from Darian Mensah (Jake Weinberg kick), 11:11. Hurricanes 14–0. Drive: 1 play, 55 yards, 0:08.
- MIA – Mark Fletcher Jr. 1-yard run (Jake Weinberg kick), 6:17. Hurricanes 21–0. Drive: 7 plays, 59 yards, 2:42.

Second quarter

- MIA – Malachi Toney 19-yard pass from Darian Mensah (Jake Weinberg kick), 14:54. Hurricanes 28–0. Drive: 4 plays, 83 yards, 1:33.
- MIA – Girard Pringle Jr. 4-yard run (Jake Weinberg kick), 10:10. Hurricanes 35–0. Drive: 6 plays, 58 yards, 3:15.
- MIA – Cooper Barkate 9-yard pass from Darian Mensah (Jake Weinberg kick), 6:27. Hurricanes 42–0. Drive: 5 plays, 61 yards, 2:01.
- MIA – Javian Mallory 11-yard run (Will Rocha kick), 0:46. Hurricanes 49–0. Drive: 8 plays, 87 yards, 2:31.

Third quarter

- MIA – Somourian Wingo 47-yard pass from Luke Nickel (Will Rocha kick), 12:36. Hurricanes 56–0. Drive: 5 plays, 75 yards, 2:24.
- MIA – Vandrevius Jacobs 33-yard pass from Luke Nickel (Will Rocha kick), 9:54. Hurricanes 63–0. Drive: 3 plays, 75 yards, 1:15.
- MIA – Vance Spafford 21-yard pass from Luke Nickel (Will Rocha kick), 5:49. Hurricanes 70–0. Drive: 6 plays, 61 yards, 3:08.
- MIA – Javian Mallory 52-yard run (Will Rocha kick), 3:31. Hurricanes 77–0. Drive: 2 plays, 55 yards, 0:45.

Fourth quarter

- FAMU – Caleb McKenzie 72-yard fumble return (Gabriel Caison kick), 6:40. Hurricanes 77–7.

Statistics	FAMU	MIA
First downs	4	42
Plays–yards	47–107	73–856
Rushes–yards	21–37	44–430
Passing yards	70	426
Passing: comp–att–int	11–26–0	27–29–0
Turnovers	0	1
Time of possession	23:00	37:00

Team	Category	Player	Statistics
Florida A&M	Passing	Armond Parker	3/7, 37 yards
Florida A&M	Rushing	Dustin Fletcher	8 carries, 24 yards
Florida A&M	Receiving	Chase Gillespie	3 receptions, 20 yards
Miami (FL)	Passing	Darian Mensah	14/15, 252 yards, 3 TD
Miami (FL)	Rushing	Javian Mallory	10 carries, 142 yards, 2 TD
Miami (FL)	Receiving	Malachi Toney	4 receptions, 96 yards, TD

=== Tennessee State ===
Tennessee State Tigers (0–3) at Florida A&M Rattlers (1–2) – Game summary

Quarter	1	2	3	4	Total
Tigers	0	0	0	0	0
Rattlers	0	0	0	0	0

at Bragg Memorial Stadium • Tallahassee, Florida

- Date: September 19
- Game time: 7:00 p.m.

Game information

First quarter
Second quarter
Third quarter
Fourth quarter

Statistics	TNST	FAMU
First downs		
Plays–yards		
Rushes–yards		
Passing yards		
Passing: comp–att–int		
Turnovers		
Time of possession		

Team	Category	Player	Statistics
Tennessee State	Passing		
Tennessee State	Rushing		
Tennessee State	Receiving		
Florida A&M	Passing		
Florida A&M	Rushing		
Florida A&M	Receiving		

=== Alabama A&M ===
Alabama A&M Bulldogs (3–1) at Florida A&M Rattlers (1–3) – Game summary

Quarter	1	2	3	4	Total
Bulldogs	0	0	0	0	0
Rattlers	0	0	0	0	0

at Bragg Memorial Stadium • Tallahassee, Florida

- Date: September 26
- Game time: 7:00 p.m.
- Game attendance: 11,380
- TV announcers (SWAC TV): Jared Oliver (play-by-play), Vaughn Wilson (analyst) and Symone Stanley (sideline)

Game information

First quarter
Second quarter
Third quarter
Fourth quarter

Statistics	AAMU	FAMU
First downs		
Plays–yards		
Rushes–yards		
Passing yards		
Passing: comp–att–int		
Turnovers		
Time of possession		

Team	Category	Player	Statistics
Alabama A&M	Passing		
Alabama A&M	Rushing		
Alabama A&M	Receiving		
Florida A&M	Passing		
Florida A&M	Rushing		
Florida A&M	Receiving		

=== at Alabama State ===
Florida A&M Rattlers (1–4) at Alabama State Hornets (3–2) – Game summary

Quarter	1	2	3	4	Total
Rattlers	0	0	0	0	0
Hornets	0	0	0	0	0

at ASU Stadium • Montgomery, Alabama

- Date: October 9
- Game time: 12:00 p.m.
- TV: SWAC TV

Game information

First quarter
Second quarter
Third quarter
Fourth quarter

Statistics	FAMU	ALST
First downs		
Plays–yards		
Rushes–yards		
Passing yards		
Passing: comp–att–int		
Turnovers		
Time of possession		

Team	Category	Player	Statistics
Florida A&M	Passing		
Florida A&M	Rushing		
Florida A&M	Receiving		
Alabama State	Passing		
Alabama State	Rushing		
Alabama State	Receiving		

=== at Jackson State ===
Florida A&M Rattlers (2–4) at Jackson State Tigers (5–1) – Game summary

Quarter	1	2	3	4	Total
Rattlers	0	0	0	0	0
Tigers	0	0	0	0	0

at Mississippi Veterans Memorial Stadium • Jackson, Mississippi

- Date: October 17
- Game time: 3:00 p.m.

Game information

First quarter
Second quarter
Third quarter
Fourth quarter

Statistics	FAMU	JKST
First downs		
Plays–yards		
Rushes–yards		
Passing yards		
Passing: comp–att–int		
Turnovers		
Time of possession		

Team	Category	Player	Statistics
Florida A&M	Passing		
Florida A&M	Rushing		
Florida A&M	Receiving		
Jackson State	Passing		
Jackson State	Rushing		
Jackson State	Receiving		

=== Arkansas–Pine Bluff ===
Arkansas–Pine Bluff Golden Lions (3–3) at Florida A&M Rattlers (2–5) – Game summary

Quarter	1	2	3	4	Total
Golden Lions	0	0	0	0	0
Rattlers	0	0	0	0	0

at Bragg Memorial Stadium • Tallahassee, Florida

- Date: October 24
- Game time: 3:00 p.m.

Game information

First quarter
Second quarter
Third quarter
Fourth quarter

Statistics	UAPB	FAMU
First downs		
Plays–yards		
Rushes–yards		
Passing yards		
Passing: comp–att–int		
Turnovers		
Time of possession		

Team	Category	Player	Statistics
Arkansas–Pine Bluff	Passing		
Arkansas–Pine Bluff	Rushing		
Arkansas–Pine Bluff	Receiving		
Florida A&M	Passing		
Florida A&M	Rushing		
Florida A&M	Receiving		

=== Southern ===
Southern Jaguars (3–5) at Florida A&M Rattlers (2–6) – Game summary

Quarter	1	2	3	4	Total
Jaguars	0	0	0	0	0
Rattlers	0	0	0	0	0

at Bragg Memorial Stadium • Tallahassee, Florida

- Date: October 31
- Game time: 3:00 p.m.

Game information

First quarter
Second quarter
Third quarter
Fourth quarter

Statistics	SOU	FAMU
First downs		
Plays–yards		
Rushes–yards		
Passing yards		
Passing: comp–att–int		
Turnovers		
Time of possession		

Team	Category	Player	Statistics
Southern	Passing		
Southern	Rushing		
Southern	Receiving		
Florida A&M	Passing		
Florida A&M	Rushing		
Florida A&M	Receiving		

=== at Alcorn State ===
Florida A&M Rattlers (2–7) at Alcorn State Braves (5–4) – Game summary

Quarter	1	2	3	4	Total
Rattlers	0	0	0	0	0
Braves	0	0	0	0	0

at Casem-Spinks Stadium • Lorman, Mississippi

- Date: November 7
- Game time: 3:00 p.m.

Game information

First quarter
Second quarter
Third quarter
Fourth quarter

Statistics	FAMU	ALCN
First downs		
Plays–yards		
Rushes–yards		
Passing yards		
Passing: comp–att–int		
Turnovers		
Time of possession		

Team	Category	Player	Statistics
Florida A&M	Passing		
Florida A&M	Rushing		
Florida A&M	Receiving		
Alcorn State	Passing		
Alcorn State	Rushing		
Alcorn State	Receiving		

=== Mississippi Valley State ===
Mississippi Valley State Delta Devils (3–7) at Florida A&M Rattlers (2–8) – Game summary

Quarter	1	2	3	4	Total
Delta Devils	0	0	0	0	0
Rattlers	0	0	0	0	0

at Bragg Memorial Stadium • Tallahassee, Florida

- Date: November 14
- Game time: 3:00 p.m.

Game information

First quarter
Second quarter
Third quarter
Fourth quarter

Statistics	MVSU	FAMU
First downs		
Plays–yards		
Rushes–yards		
Passing yards		
Passing: comp–att–int		
Turnovers		
Time of possession		

Team	Category	Player	Statistics
Mississippi Valley State	Passing		
Mississippi Valley State	Rushing		
Mississippi Valley State	Receiving		
Florida A&M	Passing		
Florida A&M	Rushing		
Florida A&M	Receiving		

=== vs. Bethune–Cookman (Florida Classic) ===
Bethune–Cookman Wildcats (5–6) vs. Florida A&M Rattlers (3–8) – Game summary

Quarter	1	2	3	4	Total
Wildcats	0	0	0	0	0
Rattlers	0	0	0	0	0

at Camping World Stadium • Orlando, Florida

- Date: November 21
- Game time: 3:30 p.m.

Game information

First quarter
Second quarter
Third quarter
Fourth quarter

Statistics	BCU	FAMU
First downs		
Plays–yards		
Rushes–yards		
Passing yards		
Passing: comp–att–int		
Turnovers		
Time of possession		

Team	Category	Player	Statistics
Bethune–Cookman	Passing		
Bethune–Cookman	Rushing		
Bethune–Cookman	Receiving		
Florida A&M	Passing		
Florida A&M	Rushing		
Florida A&M	Receiving		
