= 2026 Prairie View A&M Panthers football team =

American college football season

2026 Prairie View A&M Panthers football
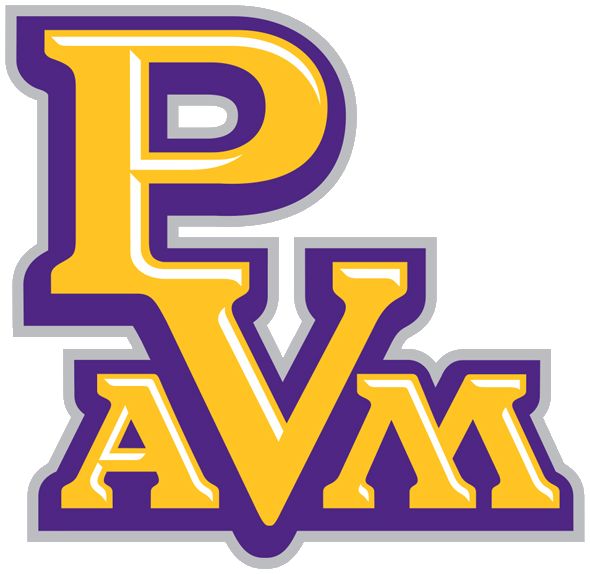

SWAC West Division champion
- Conference: Southwestern Athletic Conference
- West Division

Ranking
- BCFP: No. 3
- Record: 7–5 (6–2 SWAC)
- Head coach: Tremaine Jackson (2nd season)
- Offensive coordinator: Christopher Buckner (2nd season)
- Offensive scheme: Spread
- Defensive coordinator: Brandon Andersen (2nd season)
- Co-defensive coordinator: Trent Earley (1st season)
- Base defense: 3–4
- Home stadium: Panther Stadium at Blackshear Field

2026 Southwestern Athletic Conference football standings
	Conf.			Overall
Team	W		L	W		L
East Division
Alabama A&M x	6	–	2	9	–	3
Jackson State	5	–	3	8	–	3
Alabama State	4	–	4	6	–	5
Florida A&M*	3	–	5	4	–	8
Bethune–Cookman	3	–	5	5	–	7
Mississippi Valley State*	2	–	6	3	–	9
West Division
Prairie View A&M x	6	–	2	7	–	5
Arkansas–Pine Bluff	5	–	3	7	–	4
Southern	4	–	3	6	–	5
Alcorn State	4	–	4	6	–	6
Grambling State	3	–	4	5	–	5
Texas Southern	2	–	6	3	–	8
Championship: December 5, 2026
$ – Conference champion; x – Division champion/co-champions; y – Championship game participant; * – Ineligible for FCS postseason play due to failed academic requirements; As of November 22, 2026; Rankings from STATS Poll

The 2026 Prairie View A&M Panthers football team represents Prairie View A&M University as a member of the Southwestern Athletic Conference (SWAC) during the 2026 NCAA Division I FCS football season. The Panthers are led by second-year head coach Tremaine Jackson and play their home games at Panther Stadium at Blackshear Field in Prairie View, Texas.

== Schedule ==
Date	Time	Opponent	Site	TV	Result	Attendance
August 29	8:00 p.m.	at No. 5 Tarleton State*	Memorial Stadium; Stephenville, TX	ESPN2	L 30–49	24,481
September 6	11:00 a.m.	Texas Southern	Panther Stadium; Prairie View, TX (Labor Day Classic)	ESPN2	W 52–14	12,546
September 12	7:00 p.m.	at Baylor*	McLane Stadium; Waco, TX	ESPN+	L 3–44	38,642
September 19	7:00 p.m.	No. 12 Stephen F. Austin*	Panther Stadium; Prairie View, TX	SWAC TV	L 10–31	6,794
September 26	6:00 p.m.	vs. Grambling State	Cotton Bowl; Dallas, TX (State Fair Classic)	ESPN	W 21–14	42,942
October 3	2:00 p.m.	at Mississippi Valley State	Rice–Totten Stadium; Itta Bena, MS	SWAC TV	L 27–28	900
October 10	3:00 p.m.	Southern	Panther Stadium; Prairie View, TX	HBCU Go	L 14–28	9,410
October 17	2:00 p.m.	Alcorn State^{†}	Panther Stadium; Prairie View, TX	SWAC TV	W 41–38	
October 24	6:00 p.m.	at East Texas A&M*	Ernest Hawkins Field at Memorial Stadium; Commerce, TX	ESPN+	W 30–19	2,685
November 7	2:00 p.m.	Alabama A&M	Panther Stadium; Prairie View, TX	SWAC TV	W 31–10	8,409
November 14	2:00 p.m.	at Arkansas–Pine Bluff	Simmons Bank Field; Pine Bluff, AR	SWAC TV	W 13–10	7,172
November 21	2:00 p.m.	at Alabama State	ASU Stadium; Montgomery, AL	ESPN	W 45–10	14,344
*Non-conference game; ^{†}Homecoming; Rankings from STATS Poll released prior to the game; All times are in Central time

== Rankings ==
Ranking movements Legend: ██ Increase in ranking ██ Decrease in ranking — = Not ranked RV = Received votes ( ) = First-place votes
	Week														
Poll	Pre	1	2	3	4	5	6	7	8	9	10	11	12	13	Final
STATS	RV	RV	RV	RV	—	—	—	—	—	—	—	—			
Coaches	RV	RV	RV	RV	RV	RV	—	—	—	—	—	—			
Black College Football	2 (2)	5	2 (1)	4	6	6	9	RV	10	8	6	3			

== Game summaries ==
=== at No. 5 Tarleton State ===
Prairie View A&M Panthers (0–0) at No. 5 Tarleton State Texans (0–0) – Game summary

Quarter	1	2	3	4	Total
Panthers	7	13	3	7	30
No. 5 Texans	14	14	14	7	49

at Memorial Stadium • Stephenville, Texas

- Date: August 29
- Game time: 8:00 p.m.
- Game weather: Sunny
- Game attendance: 24,481
- Referee: John Kellermeier
- TV announcers (ESPN2): Ted Emrich and Fozzy Whittaker

Game information
First quarter
- TAR – Marquis Willis 7-yard pass from Kaden Anderson (Alejandro De La Poza kick), 10:58. Texans 7–0. Drive: 9 plays, 69 yards, 3:55.
- PV – Chase Bingmon 2-yard run (Ethan Eddins kick), 7:39. Tied 7–7. Drive: 8 plays, 74 yards, 3:14.
- TAR – Tylan Hines 40-yard run (Alejandro De La Poza kick), 6:29. Texans 14–7. Drive: 4 plays, 75 yards, 1:10.

Second quarter

- PV – Team safety, 15:00. Texans 14–9.
- PV – Ethan Eddins 28-yard field goal, 8:47. Texans 14–12. Drive: 14 plays, 44 yards, 5:58.
- TAR – Marquis Willis 30-yard pass from Kaden Anderson (Alejandro De La Poza kick), 7:51. Texans 21–12. Drive: 4 plays, 52 yards, 1:47.
- TAR – Tanner Schmidt 15-yard pass from Kaden Anderson (Alejandro De La Poza kick), 1:19. Texans 28–12. Drive: 11 plays, 55 yards, 3:48.
- PV – Tevin Carter 4-yard run (Tevin Carter pass to Travon Jones), 0:23. Texans 28–20. Drive: 5 plays, 72 yards, 0:56.

Third quarter

- TAR – Tylan Hines 63-yard run (Alejandro De La Poza kick), 12:28. Texans 35–20. Drive: 2 plays, 63 yards, 0:20.
- TAR – Kaden Anderson 2-yard run (Alejandro De La Poza kick), 7:41. Texans 42–20. Drive: 8 plays, 55 yards, 3:10.
- PV – Ethan Eddins 21-yard field goal, 3:45. Texans 42–23. Drive: 9 plays, 73 yards, 3:50.

Fourth quarter

- TAR – Klein Essler 7-yard pass from Brayden Locke (Alejandro De La Poza kick), 11:52. Texans 49–23. Drive: 12 plays, 83 yards, 6:32.
- PV – Jahbari Kuykendall 53-yard pass from Tevin Carter (Ethan Eddins kick), 9:51. Texans 49–30. Drive: 6 plays, 84 yards, 1:56.

Statistics	PV	TAR
First downs	26	26
Plays–yards	78–524	65–506
Rushes–yards	35–188	38–232
Passing yards	336	274
Passing: comp–att–int	28–43–0	20–27–0
Turnovers	0	0
Time of possession	30:33	29:27

Team	Category	Player	Statistics
Prairie View A&M	Passing	Tevin Carter	25/40, 309 yards, TD
Prairie View A&M	Rushing	Tevin Carter	14 carries, 130 yards, TD
Prairie View A&M	Receiving	Damien McDonald	4 receptions, 75 yards
Tarleton State	Passing	Kaden Anderson	15/21, 224 yards, 3 TD
Tarleton State	Rushing	Tylan Hines	25 carries, 184 yards, 2 TD
Tarleton State	Receiving	Marquis Willis	5 receptions, 102 yards, 2 TD

=== Texas Southern (Labor Day Classic) ===
Texas Southern Tigers (1–0) at Prairie View A&M Panthers (0–1) – Game summary

Quarter	1	2	3	4	Total
Tigers	0	7	0	7	14
Panthers	17	0	28	7	52

at Panther Stadium • Prairie View, Texas

- Date: September 6
- Game time: 11:00 a.m.
- Game weather: Sunny
- Game attendance: 12,546
- Referee: Nathan Pinkard
- TV: ESPN2

Game information

First quarter

- PV – Jahbari Kuykendall 90-yard kickoff return (Ethan Eddins kick), 14:45. Panthers 7–0.
- PV – Damien McDaniel 24-yard pass from Tevin Carter (Ethan Eddins kick), 10:32. Panthers 14–0. Drive: 3 plays, 34 yards, 2:03.
- PV – Ethan Eddins 37-yard field goal, 0:36. Panthers 17–0. Drive: 6 plays, 21 yards, 1:26.

Second quarter

- TXSO – Cam'Ron McCoy 17-yard run (Miguel Arana III kick), 11:46. Panthers 17–7. Drive: 7 plays, 75 yards, 3:50.

Third quarter

- PV – Tevin Carter 24-yard run (Ethan Eddins kick), 9:01. Panthers 24–7. Drive: 5 plays, 43 yards, 2:03.
- PV – Travon Jones 39-yard pass from Tevin Carter (Ethan Eddins kick), 6:41. Panthers 31–7. Drive: 2 plays, 53 yards, 0:45.
- PV – Chase Bingmon 46-yard pass from Tevin Carter (Ethan Eddins kick), 3:50. Panthers 38–7. Drive: 2 plays, 59 yards, 0:43.
- PV – Chase Bingmon 2-yard run (Ethan Eddins kick), 1:00. Panthers 45–7. Drive: 4 plays, 46 yards, 1:48.

Fourth quarter

- PV – Travon Jones 2-yard pass from Tevin Carter (Ethan Eddins kick), 10:04. Panthers 52–7. Drive: 7 plays, 57 yards, 1:20.
- TXSO – Ri'Jon Hammond 8-yard run (Miguel Arana III kick), 0:05. Panthers 52–14. Drive: 14 plays, 71 yards, 7:14.

Statistics	TXSO	PV
First downs	21	19
Plays–yards	77–318	54–398
Rushes–yards	50–216	26–160
Passing yards	102	238
Passing: comp–att–int	14–27–0	21–28–0
Turnovers	2	0
Time of possession	40:22	17:35

Team	Category	Player	Statistics
Texas Southern	Passing	Cam'Ron McCoy	10/19, 91 yards
Texas Southern	Rushing	Athean Renfro Jr.	17 carries, 85 yards
Texas Southern	Receiving	Roriyon Richardson	4 receptions, 45 yards
Prairie View A&M	Passing	Tevin Carter	16/22, 217 yards, 4 TD
Prairie View A&M	Rushing	Chase Bingmon	10 carries, 60 yards, TD
Prairie View A&M	Receiving	Rodny Ojo	3 receptions, 68 yards

=== at Baylor (FBS) ===
Prairie View A&M Panthers (1–1) at Baylor Bears (FBS) (0–1) – Game summary

Quarter	1	2	3	4	Total
Panthers	3	0	0	0	3
Bears (FBS)	17	17	7	3	44

at McLane Stadium • Waco, Texas

- Date: September 12
- Game time: 7:00 p.m.
- Game weather: Clear • Temperature: 96 °F (36 °C)
- Game attendance: 38,642
- Referee: Michael McCabe
- TV announcers (ESPN+): Mark Neely and Barrett Brooks

Game information

First quarter

- PVAM – Ethan Eddins 25-yard field goal, 10:58. Aggies 3–0. Drive: 10 plays, 57 yards, 4:02.
- BAY – Rhett Armstrong 46-yard field goal, 8:20. Tied 3–3. Drive: 8 plays, 35 yards, 2:31.
- BAY – Caden Knighten 5-yard run (Rhett Armstrong kick), 4:22. Bears 10–3. Drive: 8 plays, 53 yards, 3:34.
- BAY – Jayden McGowan 33-yard pass from Nate Bennett (Rhett Armstrong kick), 0:59. Bears 17–3. Drive: 2 plays, 36 yards, 0:27.

Second quarter

- BAY – Dre'lon Miller 22-yard pass from Nate Bennett (Rhett Armstrong kick), 13:51. Bears 24–3. Drive: 3 plays, 44 yards, 1:03.
- BAY – Nate Bennett 17-yard run (Rhett Armstrong kick), 12:55. Bears 31–3. Drive: 1 play, 17 yards, 0:07.
- BAY – Rhett Armstrong 45-yard field goal, 4:10. Bears 34–3. Drive: 11 plays, 72 yards, 3:52.

Third quarter

- BAY – Jayden McGowan 13-yard run (Rhett Armstrong kick), 1:39. Bears 41–3. Drive: 11 plays, 80 yards, 5:20.

Fourth quarter

- BAY – Rhett Armstrong 22-yard field goal, 8:42. Bears 44–3. Drive: 14 plays, 63 yards, 5:26.

Statistics	PV	BAY
First downs	7	32
Plays–yards	52–110	84–552
Rushes–yards	25–36	41–219
Passing yards	74	333
Passing: comp–att–int	14–27–0	26–43–3
Turnovers	1	3
Time of possession	25:38	34:22

Team	Category	Player	Statistics
Prairie View A&M	Passing	Tevin Carter	14/25, 74 yards
Prairie View A&M	Rushing	Zayvion Turner-Knox	4 carries, 12 yards
Prairie View A&M	Receiving	Ky'Yon Harris	3 receptions, 38 yards
Baylor	Passing	Nate Bennett	24/36, 314 yards, 3 TD, 2 INT
Baylor	Rushing	Dawson Pendergrass	15 carries, 69 yards
Baylor	Receiving	Gavin Freeman	10 receptions, 104 yards

=== No. 12 Stephen F. Austin ===
No. 12 Stephen F. Austin Lumberjacks (3–0) at Prairie View A&M Panthers (1–2) – Game summary

Quarter	1	2	3	4	Total
No. 12 Lumberjacks	0	0	0	0	0
Panthers	0	0	0	0	0

at Panther Stadium • Prairie View, Texas

- Date: September 19
- Game time: 7:00 p.m.

Game information

First quarter
Second quarter
Third quarter
Fourth quarter

Statistics	SFA	PV
First downs		
Plays–yards		
Rushes–yards		
Passing yards		
Passing: comp–att–int		
Turnovers		
Time of possession		

Team	Category	Player	Statistics
Stephen F. Austin	Passing		
Stephen F. Austin	Rushing		
Stephen F. Austin	Receiving		
Prairie View A&M	Passing		
Prairie View A&M	Rushing		
Prairie View A&M	Receiving		

=== vs. Grambling State (State Fair Classic) ===
Prairie View A&M Panthers (1–3) vs. Grambling State Tigers (2–1) – Game summary

Quarter	1	2	3	4	Total
Panthers	0	0	0	0	0
Tigers	0	0	0	0	0

at Cotton Bowl • Dallas, Texas

- Date: September 26
- Game time: 6:00 p.m.
- TV: ESPN

Game information

First quarter
Second quarter
Third quarter
Fourth quarter

Statistics	PV	GRAM
First downs		
Plays–yards		
Rushes–yards		
Passing yards		
Passing: comp–att–int		
Turnovers		
Time of possession		

Team	Category	Player	Statistics
Prairie View A&M	Passing		
Prairie View A&M	Rushing		
Prairie View A&M	Receiving		
Grambling State	Passing		
Grambling State	Rushing		
Grambling State	Receiving		

=== at Mississippi Valley State ===
Prairie View A&M Panthers (2–3) at Mississippi Valley State Delta Devils (1–4) – Game summary

Quarter	1	2	3	4	Total
Panthers	0	0	0	0	0
Delta Devils	0	0	0	0	0

at Rice–Totten Stadium • Itta Bena, Mississippi

- Date: October 3
- Game time: 2:00 p.m.

Game information

First quarter
Second quarter
Third quarter
Fourth quarter

Statistics	PV	MVSU
First downs		
Plays–yards		
Rushes–yards		
Passing yards		
Passing: comp–att–int		
Turnovers		
Time of possession		

Team	Category	Player	Statistics
Prairie View A&M	Passing		
Prairie View A&M	Rushing		
Prairie View A&M	Receiving		
Mississippi Valley State	Passing		
Mississippi Valley State	Rushing		
Mississippi Valley State	Receiving		

=== Southern ===
Southern Jaguars (2–4) at Prairie View A&M Panthers (2–4) – Game summary

Quarter	1	2	3	4	Total
Jaguars	0	0	0	0	0
Panthers	0	0	0	0	0

at Panther Stadium • Prairie View, Texas

- Date: October 10
- Game time: 3:00 p.m.
- TV: HBCU Go

Game information

First quarter
Second quarter
Third quarter
Fourth quarter

Statistics	SOU	PV
First downs		
Plays–yards		
Rushes–yards		
Passing yards		
Passing: comp–att–int		
Turnovers		
Time of possession		

Team	Category	Player	Statistics
Southern	Passing		
Southern	Rushing		
Southern	Receiving		
Prairie View A&M	Passing		
Prairie View A&M	Rushing		
Prairie View A&M	Receiving		

=== Alcorn State ===
Alcorn State Braves (4–3) at Prairie View A&M Panthers (2–5) – Game summary

Quarter	1	2	3	4	Total
Braves	0	0	0	0	0
Panthers	0	0	0	0	0

at Panther Stadium • Prairie View, Texas

- Date: October 17
- Game time: 6:00 p.m.

Game information

First quarter
Second quarter
Third quarter
Fourth quarter

Statistics	ALCN	PV
First downs		
Plays–yards		
Rushes–yards		
Passing yards		
Passing: comp–att–int		
Turnovers		
Time of possession		

Team	Category	Player	Statistics
Alcorn State	Passing		
Alcorn State	Rushing		
Alcorn State	Receiving		
Prairie View A&M	Passing		
Prairie View A&M	Rushing		
Prairie View A&M	Receiving		

=== at East Texas A&M ===
Prairie View A&M Panthers (3–5) at East Texas A&M Lions (2–5) – Game summary

Quarter	1	2	3	4	Total
Panthers	0	0	0	0	0
Lions	0	0	0	0	0

at Ernest Hawkins Field at Memorial Stadium • Commerce, Texas

- Date: October 24
- Game time: 6:00 p.m.

Game information

First quarter
Second quarter
Third quarter
Fourth quarter

Statistics	PV	ETAM
First downs		
Plays–yards		
Rushes–yards		
Passing yards		
Passing: comp–att–int		
Turnovers		
Time of possession		

Team	Category	Player	Statistics
Prairie View A&M	Passing		
Prairie View A&M	Rushing		
Prairie View A&M	Receiving		
East Texas A&M	Passing		
East Texas A&M	Rushing		
East Texas A&M	Receiving		

=== Alabama A&M ===
Alabama A&M Bulldogs (7–2) at Prairie View A&M Panthers (4–5) – Game summary

Quarter	1	2	3	4	Total
Bulldogs	0	0	0	0	0
Panthers	0	0	0	0	0

at Panther Stadium • Prairie View, Texas

- Date: November 7
- Game time: 2:00 p.m.

Game information

First quarter
Second quarter
Third quarter
Fourth quarter

Statistics	AAMU	PV
First downs		
Plays–yards		
Rushes–yards		
Passing yards		
Passing: comp–att–int		
Turnovers		
Time of possession		

Team	Category	Player	Statistics
Alabama A&M	Passing		
Alabama A&M	Rushing		
Alabama A&M	Receiving		
Prairie View A&M	Passing		
Prairie View A&M	Rushing		
Prairie View A&M	Receiving		

=== at Arkansas–Pine Bluff ===
Prairie View A&M Panthers (5–5) at Arkansas–Pine Bluff Golden Lions (6–3) – Game summary

Quarter	1	2	3	4	Total
Panthers	0	0	0	0	0
Golden Lions	0	0	0	0	0

at Simmons Bank Field • Pine Bluff, Arkansas

- Date: November 14
- Game time: 2:00 p.m.

Game information

First quarter
Second quarter
Third quarter
Fourth quarter

Statistics	PV	UAPB
First downs		
Plays–yards		
Rushes–yards		
Passing yards		
Passing: comp–att–int		
Turnovers		
Time of possession		

Team	Category	Player	Statistics
Prairie View A&M	Passing		
Prairie View A&M	Rushing		
Prairie View A&M	Receiving		
Arkansas–Pine Bluff	Passing		
Arkansas–Pine Bluff	Rushing		
Arkansas–Pine Bluff	Receiving		

=== at Alabama State ===
Prairie View A&M Panthers (6–5) at Alabama State Hornets (6–4) – Game summary

Quarter	1	2	3	4	Total
Panthers	0	0	0	0	0
Hornets	0	0	0	0	0

at ASU Stadium • Montgomery, Alabama

- Date: November 21
- Game time: 2:00 p.m.

Game information

First quarter
Second quarter
Third quarter
Fourth quarter

Statistics	PV	ALST
First downs		
Plays–yards		
Rushes–yards		
Passing yards		
Passing: comp–att–int		
Turnovers		
Time of possession		

Team	Category	Player	Statistics
Prairie View A&M	Passing		
Prairie View A&M	Rushing		
Prairie View A&M	Receiving		
Alabama State	Passing		
Alabama State	Rushing		
Alabama State	Receiving		
