= 2026 Alabama A&M Bulldogs football team =

American college football season

2026 Alabama A&M Bulldogs football

SWAC East Division champion
- Conference: Southwestern Athletic Conference
- East Division

Ranking
- BCFP: No. 4
- Record: 9–3 (6–2 SWAC)
- Head coach: Sam Shade (2nd season)
- Offensive coordinator: Dennis Alexander (2nd season)
- Defensive coordinator: Chris Shelling (2nd season)
- Home stadium: Louis Crews Stadium

2026 Southwestern Athletic Conference football standings
	Conf.			Overall
Team	W		L	W		L
East Division
Alabama A&M x	6	–	2	9	–	3
Jackson State	5	–	3	8	–	3
Alabama State	4	–	4	6	–	5
Florida A&M*	3	–	5	4	–	8
Bethune–Cookman	3	–	5	5	–	7
Mississippi Valley State*	2	–	6	3	–	9
West Division
Prairie View A&M x	6	–	2	7	–	5
Arkansas–Pine Bluff	5	–	3	7	–	4
Southern	4	–	3	6	–	5
Alcorn State	4	–	4	6	–	6
Grambling State	3	–	4	5	–	5
Texas Southern	2	–	6	3	–	8
Championship: December 5, 2026
$ – Conference champion; x – Division champion/co-champions; y – Championship game participant; * – Ineligible for FCS postseason play due to failed academic requirements; As of November 22, 2026; Rankings from STATS Poll

The 2026 Alabama A&M Bulldogs football team is the program that represents Alabama A&M University as they are a member of the Southwestern Athletic Conference (SWAC) East Divison during the 2026 NCAA Division I FCS football season. The Bulldogs are led by second-year head coach Sam Shade and play their home games at Louis Crews Stadium in Huntsville, Alabama.

== Schedule ==
Date	Time	Opponent	Site	TV	Result	Attendance
August 29	6:30 p.m.	vs. Howard*	Center Parc Stadium; Atlanta, GA (MEAC/SWAC Challenge)	ABC	L 24–31	17,320
September 5	6:00 p.m.	Miles*	Louis Crews Stadium; Huntsville, AL	SWAC TV	W 38–23	13,634
September 12	6:00 p.m.	Tennessee State*	Louis Crews Stadium; Huntsville, AL	SWAC TV	W 30–3	13,749
September 19	6:00 p.m.	Bowie State*	Louis Crews Stadium; Huntsville, AL	SWAC TV	W 45–3	6,266
September 26	6:00 p.m.	at Florida A&M	Bragg Memorial Stadium; Tallahassee, FL	SWAC TV	W 40–21	11,380
October 3	4:00 p.m.	vs. No. 25 Jackson State	Ladd–Peebles Stadium; Mobile, AL	SWAC TV	L 28–31	7,490
October 10	12:00 p.m.	Bethune–Cookman	Louis Crews Stadium; Huntsville, AL	SWAC TV	W 55–17	5,153
October 17	2:00 p.m.	Grambling State^{†}	Louis Crews Stadium; Huntsville, AL	SWAC TV	W 61–31	14,096
October 31	2:30 p.m.	vs. Alabama State	Legion Field; Birmingham, AL (Magic City Classic)	ESPN+	W 31–28	69,384
November 7	2:00 p.m.	at Prairie View A&M	Panther Stadium; Prairie View, TX	SWAC TV	L 10–31	8,409
November 14	2:00 p.m.	Texas Southern	Louis Crews Stadium; Huntsville, AL	SWAC TV	W 35–6	10,459
November 21	2:00 p.m.	at Mississippi Valley State	Rice–Totten Stadium; Itta Bena, MS	SWAC TV	W 51–19	1,123
*Non-conference game; ^{†}Homecoming; Rankings from STATS Poll released prior to the game; All times are in Central time

== Rankings ==
Ranking movements Legend: ██ Increase in ranking ██ Decrease in ranking — = Not ranked RV = Received votes ( ) = First-place votes
	Week														
Poll	Pre	1	2	3	4	5	6	7	8	9	10	11	12	13	Final
STATS	—	—	—	—	—	—	—	—	RV	RV	RV	RV			
Coaches	—	—	—	—	—	—	—	—	RV	RV	24	RV			
Black College Football	RV	RV	10	8	7	5	4	3	2	1	1 (13)	4			

== Game summaries ==
=== vs. Howard (MEAC/SWAC Challenge) ===
Howard Bison (0–0) vs. Alabama A&M Bulldogs (0–0) – Game summary

Quarter	1	2	3	4	Total
Bison	10	10	3	8	31
Bulldogs	0	14	0	10	24

at Center Parc Stadium • Atlanta, Georgia

- Date: August 29
- Game time: 6:30 p.m.
- Game weather: Sunny • Temperature: 85 °F (29 °C)
- Game attendance: 17,320
- Referee: Javarro Edwards
- TV announcers (ABC): Tiffany Greene, Jay Walker and Quint Kessenich

Game information

First quarter

- HOW – Markus Hopson 1-yard pass from Ja'Shawn Scroggins (Matt Conord kick), 7:28. Bison 7–0. Drive: 12 plays, 49 yards, 5:44.
- HOW – Matt Conord 18-yard field goal, 3:14. Bison 10–0. Drive: 8 plays, 45 yards, 3:09.

Second quarter

- HOW – Matt Conord 19-yard field goal, 13:31. Bison 13–0. Drive: 9 plays, 76 yards, 2:45.
- AAMU – Jarel Williams 26-yard pass from Cornelious Brown IV (David Faulk kick), 8:39. Bison 13–7. Drive: 4 plays, 69 yards, 0:56.
- HOW – Nathanial Clark 4-yard pass from Ja'Shawn Scroggins (Matt Conord kick), 4:23. Bison 20–7. Drive: 8 plays, 68 yards, 4:01.
- AAMU – Imari Conley 14-yard pass from Cornelious Brown IV (David Faulk kick), 2:13. Bison 20–14. Drive: 4 plays, 83 yards, 2:05.

Third quarter

- HOW – Matt Conord 31-yard field goal, 1:52. Bison 23–14. Drive: 10 plays, 46 yards, 4:49.

Fourth quarter

- AAMU – Cornelious Brown IV 4-yard run (David Faulk kick), 13:10. Bison 23–21. Drive: 11 plays, 80 yards, 3:36.
- AAMU – David Faulk 32-yard field goal, 7:49. Bulldogs 24–23. Drive: 10 plays, 32 yards, 3:45.
- HOW – Se'Quan Osborne 51-yard pass from Ja'Shawn Scroggins (Ja'Shawn Scroggins–Nathanial Clark pass), 2:41. Bison 31–24. Drive: 6 plays, 83 yards, 2:36.

Statistics	HOW	AAMU
First downs	21	19
Plays–yards	78–436	60–405
Rushes–yards	40–114	19–151
Passing yards	322	254
Passing: comp–att–int	20–38–0	25–41–1
Turnovers	1	2
Time of possession	36:04	23:56

Team	Category	Player	Statistics
Howard	Passing	Ja'Shawn Scroggins	19/36, 315 yards, 3 TD
Howard	Rushing	Ja'Shawn Scroggins	15 carries, 49 yards
Howard	Receiving	Semaj Pierre	2 receptions, 68 yards
Alabama A&M	Passing	Cornelious Brown IV	25/41, 254 yards, 2 TD, INT
Alabama A&M	Rushing	Maurice Edwards IV	7 carries, 57 yards
Alabama A&M	Receiving	Jarel Williams	4 receptions, 72 yards, TD

=== Miles (DII) ===
Miles Golden Bears (0–1) at Alabama A&M Bulldogs (0–1) – Game summary

Quarter	1	2	3	4	Total
Golden Bears (DII)	7	0	7	9	23
Bulldogs	14	10	14	0	38

at Louis Crews Stadium • Normal, Alabama

- Date: September 5
- Game time: 6:00 p.m.
- Game weather: Sunny • Temperature: 96 °F (36 °C) • Wind: NW at 4 miles per hour (6.4 km/h)
- Game attendance: 13,634
- Referee: Charles Green
- TV announcers (SWAC TV): Mo Carter (play-by-play), Charles Porter (analyst) and Thai Floyd (sideline)

Game information

First quarter

- AAMU – Kolton Nero 7-yard run (David Faulk kick), 10:08. Bulldogs 7–0. Drive: 5 plays, 80 yards, 2:00.
- AAMU – Troy Bruce 2-yard run (David Faulk kick), 5:00. Bulldogs 14–0. Drive: 10 plays, 89 yards, 4:11.
- MIL – Brinley Vandiver 8-yard run (Rourke Davis kick), 0:23. Bulldogs 14–7. Drive: 8 plays, 80 yards, 4:23.

Second quarter

- AAMU – David Faulk 34-yard field goal, 9:53. Bulldogs 17–7. Drive: 13 plays, 63 yards, 5:27.
- AAMU – Jordan Chambers-Smith 15-yard pass from Cornelious Brown IV (David Faulk kick), 0:33. Bulldogs 24–7. Drive: 7 plays, 80 yards, 1:35.

Third quarter

- AAMU – Kolton Nero 7-yard run (David Faulk kick), 10:31. Bulldogs 31–7. Drive: 10 plays, 70 yards, 4:20.
- MIL – Brinley Vandiver 4-yard run (Rourke Davis kick), 4:39. Bulldogs 31–14. Drive: 11 plays, 75 yards, 5:45.
- AAMU – Troy Bruce 2-yard run (David Faulk kick), 2:03. Bulldogs 38–14. Drive: 6 plays, 74 yards, 2:26.

Fourth quarter

- MIL – Roderick Thomas 3-yard run (Rourke Davis kick), 13:21. Bulldogs 38–21. Drive: 9 plays, 75 yards, 3:33.
- MIL – Team safety, 13:14. Bulldogs 38–23.

Statistics	MIL	AAMU
First downs	21	28
Plays–yards	68–329	60–471
Rushes–yards	29–121	37–279
Passing yards	208	192
Passing: comp–att–int	26–39–0	17–23–0
Turnovers	0	0
Time of possession	32:45	27:15

Team	Category	Player	Statistics
Miles	Passing	Brinley Vandiver	26/39, 208 yards
Miles	Rushing	Brinley Vandiver	11 carries, 66 yards, 2 TD
Miles	Receiving	Edward Osley	9 receptions, 64 yards
Alabama A&M	Passing	Cornelious Brown IV	15/21, 181 yards, TD
Alabama A&M	Rushing	Troy Bruce	11 carries, 145 yards, 2 TD
Alabama A&M	Receiving	Imari Conley	2 receptions, 42 yards

=== Tennessee State ===
Tennessee State Tigers (0–2) at Alabama A&M Bulldogs (1–1) – Game summary

Quarter	1	2	3	4	Total
Tigers	0	3	0	0	3
Bulldogs	14	6	0	10	30

at Louis Crews Stadium • Normal, Alabama

- Date: September 12
- Game time: 6:00 p.m.
- Game weather: Sunny
- Game attendance: 13,749
- Referee: Ivan Daniels
- TV announcers (SWAC TV): Mo Carter (play-by-play), Tolly Carr (analyst) and Thai Floyd (sideline)

Game information

First quarter

- AAMU - Jarel Williams 61-yard pass from Cornelious Brown IV (David Faulk kick), 8:36. Bulldogs 7–0. Drive: 1 play, 61 yards, 0:08.
- AAMU - Donovan Price 30-yard pass form Cornelious Brown IV (David Faulk kick), 3:17. Bulldogs 14–0. Drive: 7 plays, 80 yards, 3:32.

Second quarter

- TNST - Preston Hurless 37-yard field goal, 13:34. Bulldogs 14–3. Drive: 8 plays, 58 yards, 2:42.
- AAMU - David Faulk 35-yard field goal, 8:35. Bulldogs 17–3. Drive: 8 plays, 61 yards, 4:53.
- AAMU - David Faulk 28-yard field goal, 0:09. Bulldogs 20–3. Drive: 13 plays, 59 yards, 2:06.

Third quarter

- No scoring plays.

Fourth quarter

- AAMU - Jaylen Bean 11-yard pass form Cornelious Brown IV (David Faulk kick), 14:30. Bulldogs 27–3. Drive: 7 plays, 77 yards, 3:27.
- AAMU - David Faulk 22-yard field goal, 5:19. Bulldogs 30–3. Drive: 7 plays, 26 yards, 4:19.

Statistics	TNST	AAMU
First downs	17	20
Plays–yards	71–251	67–452
Rushes–yards	30–64	29–126
Passing yards	187	326
Passing: comp–att–int	19–41–2	24–38–1
Turnovers	3	1
Time of possession	28:39	31:21

Team	Category	Player	Statistics
Tennessee State	Passing	Daylin Lee	19/41, 187 yards, 2 INT
Tennessee State	Rushing	Brenton Paul	12 carries, 40 yards
Tennessee State	Receiving	Cam Bulluck	4 receptions 50 yards
Alabama A&M	Passing	Cornelious Brown IV	24/38, 326 yards, 3 TD, INT
Alabama A&M	Rushing	Kolton Nero	10 carries, 52 yards
Alabama A&M	Receiving	Jarel Williams	8 receptions, 175 yards, TD

=== Bowie State (DII) ===
Bowie State Bulldogs (0–2) at Alabama A&M Bulldogs (2–1) – Game summary

Quarter	1	2	3	4	Total
Bowie State (DII)	0	3	0	0	3
Alabama A&M	17	14	14	0	45

at Louis Crews Stadium • Normal, Alabama

- Date: September 19
- Game time: 6:00 p.m.
- Game weather: Cloudy • Temperature: 81 °F (27 °C) • Wind: SE at 4 miles per hour (6.4 km/h)
- Game attendance: 6,266
- Referee: Jarvis Walker
- TV announcers (SWAC TV): Mo Carter (play-by-play), Reggie Floyd (analyst) and Faith Daniels (sideline)

Game information

First quarter

- (13:55) AAMU – Kolton Nero 9-yard run, David Faulk kick (Drive: 3 plays, 75 yards, 1:05; Alabama A&M 7–0)
- (9:21) AAMU – Jarel Williams 16-yard pass from Cornelious Brown IV, David Faulk kick (Drive: 8 plays, 97 yards, 2:56; Alabama A&M 14–0)
- (2:30) AAMU – David Faulk 40-yard field goal (Drive: 11 plays, 56 yards, 4:23; Alabama A&M 17–0)

Second quarter

- (12:39) AAMU – Cornelious Brown IV 2-yard run, David Faulk kick (Drive: 9 plays, 64 yards, 2:38; Alabama A&M 24–0)
- (4:48) BOW – Peter Lipscombe 24-yard field goal (Drive: 15 plays, 63 yards, 7:51; Alabama A&M 24–3)
- (1:36) AAMU – Jordan Chambers-Smith 21-yard pass from Cornelious Brown IV, David Faulk kick (Drive: 6 plays, 75 yards, 3:12; Alabama A&M 31–3)

Third quarter

- (8:35) AAMU – Jordan Chambers-Smith 13-yard pass from Cornelious Brown IV, David Faulk kick (Drive: 9 plays, 72 yards, 4:25; Alabama A&M 38–3)
- (0:00) AAMU – Jeremiah Hudson-Davis 82-yard blocked field goal return, David Faulk kick (Alabama A&M 45–3)

Fourth quarter

No scoring plays

Statistics	BOW	AAMU
First downs	12	28
Plays–yards	52–165	61–538
Rushes–yards	42–158	20–112
Passing yards	7	426
Passing: comp–att–int	2–10–0	31–41–0
Turnovers	0	0
Time of possession	34:24	25:36

Team	Category	Player	Statistics
Bowie State	Passing	Kyle Hawkins	2/10, 7 yards
Bowie State	Rushing	Maximus Jones	18 carries, 74 yards
Bowie State	Receiving	Markeith Hines	1 reception, 6 yards
Alabama A&M	Passing	Cornelious Brown IV	25/32, 350 yards, 2 TD
Alabama A&M	Rushing	Byron Perrilliat	6 carries, 54 yards
Alabama A&M	Receiving	Jordan Chambers-Smith	7 receptions, 147 yards, 2 TD

=== at Florida A&M ===
Alabama A&M Bulldogs (3–1) at Florida A&M Rattlers (1–3) – Game summary

Quarter	1	2	3	4	Total
Bulldogs	0	0	0	0	0
Rattlers	0	0	0	0	0

at Bragg Memorial Stadium • Tallahassee, Florida

- Date: September 26
- Game time: 6:00 p.m.
- Game attendance: 11,380
- TV announcers (SWAC TV): Jared Oliver (play-by-play), Vaughn Wilson (analyst) and Symone Stanley (sideline)

Game information

First quarter
Second quarter
Third quarter
Fourth quarter

Statistics	AAMU	FAMU
First downs		
Plays–yards		
Rushes–yards		
Passing yards		
Passing: comp–att–int		
Turnovers		
Time of possession		

Team	Category	Player	Statistics
Alabama A&M	Passing		
Alabama A&M	Rushing		
Alabama A&M	Receiving		
Florida A&M	Passing		
Florida A&M	Rushing		
Florida A&M	Receiving		

=== vs. No. 25 Jackson State ===
Alabama A&M Bulldogs (4–1) vs. No. 25 Jackson State Tigers (4–0) – Game summary

Quarter	1	2	3	4	Total
Bulldogs	0	0	0	0	0
No. 25 Tigers	0	0	0	0	0

at Ladd–Peebles Stadium • Mobile, Alabama

- Date: October 3
- Game time: 4:00 p.m.
- TV: SWAC TV

Game information

First quarter
Second quarter
Third quarter
Fourth quarter

Statistics	AAMU	JKST
First downs		
Plays–yards		
Rushes–yards		
Passing yards		
Passing: comp–att–int		
Turnovers		
Time of possession		

Team	Category	Player	Statistics
Alabama A&M	Passing		
Alabama A&M	Rushing		
Alabama A&M	Receiving		
Jackson State	Passing		
Jackson State	Rushing		
Jackson State	Receiving		

=== Bethnue–Cookman ===
Bethune–Cookman Wildcats (3–2) at Alabama A&M Bulldogs (4–2) – Game summary

Quarter	1	2	3	4	Total
Wildcats	0	0	0	0	0
Bulldogs	0	0	0	0	0

at Louis Crews Stadium • Normal, Alabama

- Date: October 10
- Game time: 12:00 p.m.
- TV: SWAC TV

Game information

First quarter
Second quarter
Third quarter
Fourth quarter

Statistics	BCU	AAMU
First downs		
Plays–yards		
Rushes–yards		
Passing yards		
Passing: comp–att–int		
Turnovers		
Time of possession		

Team	Category	Player	Statistics
Bethune–Cookman	Passing		
Bethune–Cookman	Rushing		
Bethune–Cookman	Receiving		
Alabama A&M	Passing		
Alabama A&M	Rushing		
Alabama A&M	Receiving		

=== Grambling State ===
Grambling State Tigers (4–2) at Alabama A&M Bulldogs (5–2) – Game summary

Quarter	1	2	3	4	Total
Tigers	0	0	0	0	0
Bulldogs	0	0	0	0	0

at Louis Crews Stadium • Normal, Alabama

- Date: October 17
- Game time: 2:00 p.m.

Game information

First quarter
Second quarter
Third quarter
Fourth quarter

Statistics	GRAM	AAMU
First downs		
Plays–yards		
Rushes–yards		
Passing yards		
Passing: comp–att–int		
Turnovers		
Time of possession		

Team	Category	Player	Statistics
Grambling State	Passing		
Grambling State	Rushing		
Grambling State	Receiving		
Alabama A&M	Passing		
Alabama A&M	Rushing		
Alabama A&M	Receiving		

=== vs. Alabama State (Magic City Classic) ===
Alabama State Hornets (4–3) vs. Alabama A&M Bulldogs (6–2) – Game summary

Quarter	1	2	3	4	Total
Hornets	0	0	0	0	0
Bulldogs	0	0	0	0	0

at Legion Field • Birmingham, Alabama

- Date: October 31
- Game time: 2:30 p.m.

Game information

First quarter
Second quarter
Third quarter
Fourth quarter

Statistics	ALST	AAMU
First downs		
Plays–yards		
Rushes–yards		
Passing yards		
Passing: comp–att–int		
Turnovers		
Time of possession		

Team	Category	Player	Statistics
Alabama State	Passing		
Alabama State	Rushing		
Alabama State	Receiving		
Alabama A&M	Passing		
Alabama A&M	Rushing		
Alabama A&M	Receiving		

=== at Prairie View A&M ===
Alabama A&M Bulldogs (7–2) at Prairie View A&M Panthers (4–5) – Game summary

Quarter	1	2	3	4	Total
Bulldogs	0	0	0	0	0
Panthers	0	0	0	0	0

at Panther Stadium • Prairie View, Texas

- Date: November 7
- Game time: 2:00 p.m.

Game information

First quarter
Second quarter
Third quarter
Fourth quarter

Statistics	AAMU	PV
First downs		
Plays–yards		
Rushes–yards		
Passing yards		
Passing: comp–att–int		
Turnovers		
Time of possession		

Team	Category	Player	Statistics
Alabama A&M	Passing		
Alabama A&M	Rushing		
Alabama A&M	Receiving		
Prairie View A&M	Passing		
Prairie View A&M	Rushing		
Prairie View A&M	Receiving		

=== Texas Southern ===
Texas Southern Tigers (3–6) at Alabama A&M Bulldogs (7–3) – Game summary

Quarter	1	2	3	4	Total
Tigers	0	0	0	0	0
Bulldogs	0	0	0	0	0

at Louis Crews Stadium • Normal, Alabama

- Date: November 14
- Game time: 2:00 p.m.

Game information

First quarter
Second quarter
Third quarter
Fourth quarter

Statistics	TXSO	AAMU
First downs		
Plays–yards		
Rushes–yards		
Passing yards		
Passing: comp–att–int		
Turnovers		
Time of possession		

Team	Category	Player	Statistics
Texas Southern	Passing		
Texas Southern	Rushing		
Texas Southern	Receiving		
Alabama A&M	Passing		
Alabama A&M	Rushing		
Alabama A&M	Receiving		

=== at Mississippi Valley State ===
Alabama A&M Bulldogs (8–3) at Mississippi Valley State Delta Devils (3–8) – Game summary

Quarter	1	2	3	4	Total
Bulldogs	0	0	0	0	0
Delta Devils	0	0	0	0	0

at Rice–Totten Stadium • Itta Bena, Mississippi

- Date: November 21
- Game time: 2:00 p.m.

Game information

First quarter
Second quarter
Third quarter
Fourth quarter

Statistics	AAMU	MVSU
First downs		
Plays–yards		
Rushes–yards		
Passing yards		
Passing: comp–att–int		
Turnovers		
Time of possession		

Team	Category	Player	Statistics
Alabama A&M	Passing		
Alabama A&M	Rushing		
Alabama A&M	Receiving		
Mississippi Valley State	Passing		
Mississippi Valley State	Rushing		
Mississippi Valley State	Receiving		
