= Ryan Rodriguez =

American football player

No. 76 – Miami Hurricanes
- Position: Center
- Class: Redshirt Senior

Personal information
- Listed height: 6 ft 2 in (1.88 m)
- Listed weight: 300 lb (136 kg)

Career information
- High school: Christopher Columbus (Miami, Florida)
- College: Miami (FL) (2021–present)
- Stats at ESPN

Ryan Rodriguez is an American college football center for the Miami Hurricanes.

== Early life ==
Rodriguez grew up in Miami and began playing football at age four, initially as a running back. He was close friends with Andy Borregales and the two played together on the Doral Broncos. Rodriguez also played basketball growing up. He attended Doral Academy Preparatory School for middle school, where he played varsity football as an eighth grader.

Rodriguez attended Christopher Columbus High School in Miami. He was teammates with future Heisman Trophy winner Fernando Mendoza. As a sophomore, Rodriguez became a starter at tackle for the Explorers. As a junior, he helped the team win the Florida High School Athletic Association Class 8A state championship. Rodriguez was selected to play in the U.S. Army All-American Bowl after his senior season. However, the game was cancelled due to the COVID-19 pandemic.

=== Recruiting ===
Rodriguez was rated as a four-star recruit by ESPN and On3, and a three-star recruit by 247Sports and Rivals. On April 27, 2020, he verbally committed to playing college football at the University of Miami over offers such as Coastal Carolina, Indiana, Louisville, Ole Miss, Syracuse, Tulane, UConn, Wake Forest, and West Virginia. "It’s always been my dream to play [at Miami]", said Rodriguez. "So, it was gonna be hard for any other school to get me to buy into what they’re selling.

== College career ==
As a freshman in 2021, Rodriguez appeared in one game and was redshirted, primarily serving as a member of the practice squad. He then missed the entire 2022 season while recovering from offseason surgery. In 2023, Rodriguez played in six games. He also made his first career start at center in the Pinstripe Bowl against Rutgers. Rodriguez was named the Hurricanes' starting left guard ahead of the 2024 season, but suffered an ankle injury in their opener versus Florida. He missed the final 12 games of the season after undergoing surgery. Rodriguez appeared in all 16 games during the 2025 season as a reserve offensive lineman, helping Miami advance to the College Football Playoff National Championship.

Entering his sixth and final year of eligibility in 2026 season, Rodriguez worked as Miami's starting center during spring camp. He secured the starting job ahead of the season opener. In October, Rodriguez was named to midseason watchlist for the Rimington Trophy after not allowing a quarterback pressure through the first five games.

== Personal life ==
Rodriguez grew up as a diehard fan of the Miami Hurricanes. His father played college football as a center at Chowan College. Rodriguez is of Cuban descent.
