= Damon Wilson II =

American football player (born 2005)

No. 10 – Miami Hurricanes
- Position: Linebacker
- Class: Senior

Personal information
- Born: January 24, 2005 (age 21)
- Listed height: 6 ft 4 in (1.93 m)
- Listed weight: 250 lb (113 kg)

Career information
- High school: Venice (Venice, Florida)
- College: Georgia (2023–2024); Missouri (2025); Miami (FL) (2026–present)

Awards and highlights
- Second-team All-SEC (2025)
- Stats at ESPN

Damon Derrick Wilson II (born January 24, 2005) is an American college football linebacker for the Miami Hurricanes. He previously played for the Georgia Bulldogs and Missouri Tigers.

== Early life ==
Wilson attended Venice High School in Venice, Florida. As a junior, he recorded 90 tackles, 23 tackles-for-loss, and a school record 14.5 sacks. He finished his high school career totaling 268 tackles and 31 sacks. A four-star recruit, Wilson committed to play college football at the University of Georgia over offers from Alabama and Ohio State.

== College career ==
=== Georgia ===
Wilson played sparingly as a freshman. As a sophomore against Texas, he recorded a sack, a tackle for loss, and a forced fumble. Wilson finished his sophomore season totaling 22 tackles, six tackles for loss, three sacks, two forced fumbles and two fumble recoveries. On January 6, 2025, Wilson announced that he would enter the transfer portal.

=== Missouri ===
On January 14, 2025, Wilson announced that he would transfer to Missouri. In his Missouri debut, he recorded his first multi-sack game with two sacks against Central Arkansas. Wilson continued to impress against ranked opponents with two sacks against No. 8 Alabama and a sack and his first career interception against No. 10 Vanderbilt. At the conclusion of the 2025 season, Wilson was named to the All-SEC second team.

On January 6, 2026, Wilson announced that he would enter the transfer portal for the second time.

=== Miami (FL) ===
On January 22, 2026, Wilson announced that he would transfer to Miami (FL).

== Personal life ==
On October 20, 2026, a Florida Bar employee, named Kade McLendon, was placed on administrative leave after sending racial, homophobic, and threatening messages to Wilson on Instagram. The messages were sent after Miami defeated Florida State, 43-35, in double overtime three days prior.
