= 2026 Southern Jaguars football team =

American college football season

2026 Southern Jaguars football
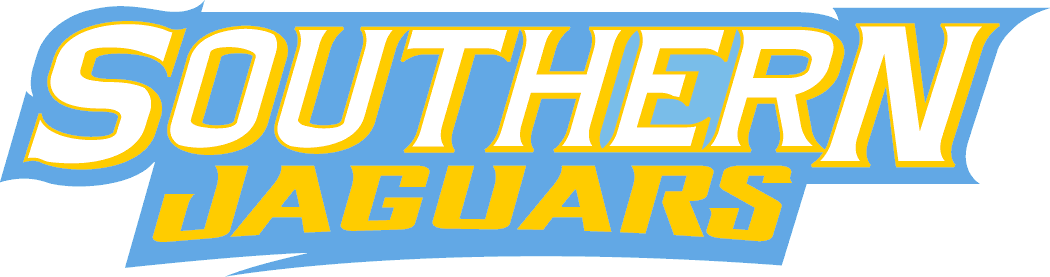
- Conference: Southwestern Athletic Conference
- West Division

Ranking
- BCFP: No. 10
- Record: 5–6 (3–4 SWAC)
- Head coach: Marshall Faulk (1st season)
- Offensive coordinator: Ken Merchant (1st season)
- Defensive coordinator: Todd Lyght (1st season)
- Home stadium: A. W. Mumford Stadium

2026 Southwestern Athletic Conference football standings
	Conf.			Overall
Team	W		L	W		L
East Division
Alabama A&M	5	–	2	8	–	3
Alabama State	4	–	3	6	–	4
Jackson State	4	–	3	7	–	3
Bethune–Cookman	3	–	4	5	–	6
Florida A&M*	2	–	5	3	–	8
Mississippi Valley State*	2	–	5	3	–	8
West Division
Prairie View A&M	5	–	2	6	–	5
Arkansas–Pine Bluff	4	–	3	6	–	4
Southern	4	–	3	6	–	5
Alcorn State	4	–	3	6	–	5
Grambling State	3	–	4	5	–	5
Texas Southern	2	–	5	3	–	7
Championship: December 5, 2026
$ – Conference champion; x – Division champion/co-champions; y – Championship game participant; * – Ineligible for FCS postseason play due to failed academic requirements; As of November 16, 2026; Rankings from STATS Poll

The 2026 Southern Jaguars football team will represent Southern University as a member of the Southwestern Athletic Conference (SWAC) during the 2026 NCAA Division I FCS football season. The Jaguars will be led by first-year head coach Marshall Faulk and will play their home games at A. W. Mumford Stadium in Baton Rouge, Louisiana.

== Schedule ==
Date	Time	Opponent	Site	TV	Result	Attendance
August 29	2:00 p.m.	vs. Alabama State (Note: The game against Alabama State, a fellow member of the SWAC, is a non-conference game and does not count in the league standings.)*	Legion Field; Birmingham, AL (Birmingham Football Classic)	ESPNU	L 17–30	31,287
September 5	7:00 p.m.	Kentucky State*	A. W. Mumford Stadium; Baton Rouge, LA	SWAC TV	W 34–15	15,094
September 12	6:00 p.m.	at No. 22 (FBS) Houston*	TDECU Stadium; Houston, TX	ESPN+	L 6–77	28,936
September 19	6:00 p.m.	No. 19т (NAIA) Louisiana Christian*	A. W. Mumford Stadium; Baton Rouge, LA	SWAC TV	W 50–31	18,069
September 26	6:00 p.m.	at Jackson State	Mississippi Veterans Memorial Stadium; Jackson, MS (rivalry)	ESPN	L 17–35	38,973
October 3	6:00 p.m.	Arkansas–Pine Bluff^{†}	A. W. Mumford Stadium; Baton Rouge, LA	SWAC TV	L 10–41	21,890
October 10	3:00 p.m.	at Prairie View A&M	Blackshear Field; Prairie View, TX	HBCU Go	W 28–14	9,410
October 24	2:00 p.m.	at Texas Southern	Reliant Stadium; Houston, TX	SWAC TV	L 21–24	21,523
October 31	2:00 p.m.	at Florida A&M	Bragg Memorial Stadium; Tallahassee, FL	HBCU Go	W 42–14	10,224
November 7	2:00 p.m.	Bethune–Cookman	A. W. Mumford Stadium; Baton Rouge, LA	SWAC TV	W 45–17	18,631
November 14	2:00 p.m.	Alcorn State	A. W. Mumford Stadium; Baton Rouge, LA	HBCU Go	W 41–28	18,122
November 28	1:00 p.m.	vs. Grambling State	Caesars Superdome; New Orleans, LA (Bayou Classic)	NBC/Peacock		
*Non-conference game; ^{†}Homecoming; Rankings from STATS Poll released prior to the game; All times are in Central time

== Game summaries ==
=== vs. Alabama State ===
Alabama State Hornets (0–0) vs. Southern Jaguars (0–0) – Game summary

Quarter	1	2	3	4	Total
Hornets	3	10	14	3	30
Jaguars	7	10	0	0	17

at Legion Field • Birmingham, Alabama

- Date: August 29
- Game time: 2:00 p.m.
- Game weather: Cloudy • Temperature: 90 °F (32 °C) • Wind: E at 5 miles per hour (8.0 km/h)
- Game attendance: 31,827
- Referee: Charles Green
- TV announcers (ESPNU): Troy Clardy and Forrest Conoly

Game information

First quarter

- SOU – Mike Franklin 29-yard run (Christopher McKenna kick), 3:25. Jaguars 7–0. Drive: 4 plays, 72 yards, 1:54.
- ALST – Andrew Abu-Akel 44-yard field goal, 1:17. Jaguars 7–3. Drive: 6 plays, 38 yards, 2:08.

Second quarter

- SOU – Christian Johnson 1-yard run (Christopher McKenna kick), 12:52. Jaguars 14–3. Drive: 10 plays, 73 yards, 3:19.
- ALST – Jamarie Hostzclaw 15-yard run (Andrew Abu-Akel kick), 11:51. Jaguars 14–10. Drive: 3 plays, 73 yards, 0:51.
- SOU – Nathan Zimmer 33-yard field goal, 3:03. Jaguars 17–10. Drive: 11 plays, 54 yards, 5:12.
- ALST – Andrew Abu-Akel 33-yard field goal, 0:13. Jaguars 17–13. Drive: 9 plays, 58 yards, 2:50.

Third quarter

- ALST – Jareese Howard 3-yard run (Andrew Abu-Akel kick), 5:30. Hornets 20–17. Drive: 7 plays, 52 yards, 3:12.
- ALST – Randall King 9-yard pass from Andrew Body (Andrew Abu-Akel kick), 3:38. Hornets 27–17. Drive: 4 plays, 34 yards, 1:09.

Fourth quarter

- ALST – Andrew Abu-Akel 31-yard field goal, 9:18. Hornets 30–17. Drive: 13 plays, 80 yards, 5:35.

Statistics	ALST	SOU
First downs	19	17
Plays–yards	61–351	67–335
Rushes–yards	38–159	40–161
Passing yards	192	174
Passing: comp–att–int	14–23–0	17–27–1
Turnovers	0	1
Time of possession	28:33	31:27

Team	Category	Player	Statistics
Alabama State	Passing	Andrew Body	14/23, 192 yards, TD
Alabama State	Rushing	Jamarie Hostzclaw	15 carries, 49 yards, TD
Alabama State	Receiving	Randall King	4 receptions, 77 yards, TD
Southern	Passing	Christian Johnson	17/27, 174 yards, INT
Southern	Rushing	Christian Johnson	14 carries, 81 yards, TD
Southern	Receiving	Daejawn Smith	4 receptions, 76 yards

=== Kentucky State (DII) ===
Kentucky State Thorobreds (DII) (1–0) at Southern Jaguars (0–1) – Game summary

Quarter	1	2	3	4	Total
Thorobreds (DII)	0	2	13	0	15
Jaguars	0	13	14	7	34

at A.W. Mumford Stadium • Baton Rouge, Louisiana

- Date: September 5
- Game time: 6:00 p.m.
- Game weather: Rain • Temperature: 85 °F (29 °C)
- Game attendance: 15,094
- Referee: Ivan Daniels
- TV announcers (SWAC TV): Butch Alsandor (play-by-play), Jorge Vargas (analyst) and Lauren Robertson (sideline)

Game information

First quarter

No scoring plays

Second quarter

- (13:44) SOU – Tayton James 85-yard interception, Chris McMcKenna kick (Southern 7–0)
- (5:54) KYST – Tray Blackmon Jr. 0-yard safety (Southern 7–2)
- (0:07) SOU – Isaiah Pina 4-yard pass from Christian Johnson (Drive: 6 plays, 65 yards, 0:28; Southern 13–2)

Third quarter

- (9:02) SOU – Trey Holly 16-yard run, Chris McMcKenna kick (Drive: 8 plays, 70 yards, 3:33; Southern 20–2)
- (5:09) SOU – Khalil Davis 25-yard pass from Christian Johnson, Chris McMcKenna kick (Drive: 6 plays, 77 yards, 2:55; Southern 27–2)
- (2:30) KYST – Tristan Thomas 72-yard pass from Jaun Gainous, Leland Gantz kick (Drive: 6 plays, 88 yards, 2:32; Southern 27–9)
- (1:40) KYST – Jaden Hale 15-yard pass from Jaun Gainous (Drive: 2 plays, 53 yards, 0:49; Southern 27–15)

Fourth quarter

- (1:08) SOU – Trey Holly 12-yard run, Chris McMcKenna kick (Drive: 7 plays, 55 yards, 3:40; Southern 34–15)

Statistics	KYST	SOU
First downs	18	19
Plays–yards	74–378	66–372
Rushes–yards	31–133	37–172
Passing yards	245	200
Passing: comp–att–int	22–43–1	15–29–0
Turnovers	1	0
Time of possession	32:36	27:24

Team	Category	Player	Statistics
Kentucky State	Passing	Jaun Gainous	17/31, 196 yards, 2 TD
Kentucky State	Rushing	Tristan Thomas	19 carries, 110 yards
Kentucky State	Receiving	Darius Cyprian	8 receptions, 77 yards
Southern	Passing	Christian Johnson	15/28, 200 yards, 2 TD
Southern	Rushing	Trey Holly	21 carries, 99 yards, 2 TD
Southern	Receiving	Daejawn Smith	4 receptions, 72 yards

=== at No. 22 (FBS) Houston ===
Southern Jaguars (1–1) at No. 22 (FBS) Houston Cougars (1–0) – Game summary

Quarter	1	2	3	4	Total
Jaguars	0	0	6	0	6
No. 22 (FBS) Cougars	28	21	21	7	77

at TDECU Stadium • Houston, Texas

- Date: September 12
- Game time: 6:00 p.m.
- Game weather: Cloudy • Temperature: 95 °F (35 °C) • Wind: SE at 8 mph (13 km/h)
- Game attendance: 28,936
- Referee: Tim Rich
- TV announcers (ESPN+): Jason Ross Jr., Tyoka Jackson and Austyn Iven

Game information

First quarter

- HOU – Patrick Overmyer 9-yard pass from Conner Weigman (Jonathan Dimas kick), 8:59. Cougars 7–0. Drive: 9 plays, 62 yards, 3:54.
- HOU – Re'Shaun Sanford II 9-yard run (Jonathan Dimas kick), 6:52. Cougars 14–0. Drive: 2 plays, 22 yards, 0:44.
- HOU – Makhi Hughes 1-yard run (Jonathan Dimas kick), 4:11. Cougars 21–0. Drive: 5 plays, 22 yards, 1:57.
- HOU – Amare Thomas 8-yard pass from Conner Weigman (Jonathan Dimas kick), 0:28. Cougars 28–0. Drive: 6 plays, 60 yards, 2:46.

Second quarter

- HOU – Koby Young 43-yard pass from Conner Weigman (Jonathan Dimas kick), 10:57. Cougars 35–0. Drive: 3 plays, 51 yards, 1:30.
- HOU – Koby Young 7-yard pass from Keisean Henderson (Jonathan Dimas kick), 6:10. Cougars 42–0. Drive: 3 plays, 25 yards, 0:48.
- HOU – John Hebert 20-yard pass from Keisean Henderson (Jonathan Dimas kick), 1:36. Cougars 49–0. Drive: 5 plays, 72 yards, 2:21.

Third quarter

- HOU – Keisean Henderson 54-yard run (Jonathan Dimas kick), 13:43. Cougars 56–0. Drive: 3 plays, 75 yards, 1:17.
- HOU – DJ Butler 9-yard run (Jonathan Dimas kick), 9:39. Cougars 63–0. Drive: 5 plays, 46 yards, 2:28.
- HOU – John Hebert 7-yard run (Jonathan Dimas kick), 4:57. Cougars 70–0. Drive: 5 plays, 52 yards, 2:24.
- SOU – Wydell Clark Jr. 79-yard pass from Wyatt McCauley (Christopher McKenna kick BLOCKED), 4:38. Cougars 70–6. Drive: 1 play, 79 yards, 0:14.

Fourth quarter

- HOU – Luke Carney 8-yard run (Jonathan Dimas kick), 5:56. Cougars 77–6. Drive: 11 plays, 75 yards, 13:42.

Statistics	SOU	HOU
First downs	4	34
Plays–yards	42–121	64–591
Rushes–yards	22–(-6)	45–388
Passing yards	127	203
Passing: comp–att–int	10–20–1	15–19–0
Turnovers	3	0
Time of possession	21:42	38:18

Team	Category	Player	Statistics
Southern	Passing	Wyatt McCauley	2/3, 85 yards, TD
Southern	Rushing	Armariyan Asberry	3 carries, 6 yards
Southern	Receiving	Wydell Clark Jr.	1 reception, 79 yards, TD
Houston	Passing	Conner Weigman	9/12, 120 yards, 3 TD
Houston	Rushing	Zane Smith	10 carries, 69 yards
Houston	Receiving	Koby Young	3 receptions, 54 yards, 2 TD

=== No. 19т (NAIA) Louisiana Christian ===
No. 19т (NAIA) Louisiana Christian Wildcats (3–0) at Southern Jaguars (1–2) – Game summary

Quarter	1	2	3	4	Total
No. 19т (NAIA) Wildcats	0	0	0	0	0
Jaguars	0	0	0	0	0

at A.W. Mumford Stadium • Baton Rouge, Louisiana

- Date: September 19
- Game time: 6:00 p.m.
- Game weather: Sunny • Temperature: 89 °F (32 °C) • Wind: NW at 6 miles per hour (9.7 km/h)
- Game attendance: 18,069
- Referee: James Crowell
- TV: SWAC TV

Game information

First quarter

- (8:24) SOU – Trey Holly 2-yard run, Chris McMcKenna kick (Drive: 11 plays, 82 yards, 5:14; Southern 7–0)
- (6:39) LCHR – Darius Washington 47-yard pass from Bryce Perkins, Preston Baker kick (Drive: 6 plays, 75 yards, 1:45; Tied 7–7)
- (6:14) SOU – Trey Holly 69-yard run, Chris McMcKenna kick (Drive: 2 plays, 69 yards, 0:20; Southern 14–7)
- (0:33) SOU – Daejawn Smith 18-yard pass from Christian Johnson, Chris McMcKenna kick (Drive: 7 plays, 45 yards, 3:44; Southern 21–7)

Second quarter

- (10:12) SOU – Christian Johnson 15-yard run (Drive: 6 plays, 45 yards, 3:07; Southern 27–7)
- (7:14) LCHR – Preston Baker 39-yard field goal (Drive: 7 plays, 33 yards, 2:50; Southern 27–10)
- (0:03) SOU – Nathan Zimmer 33-yard field goal (Drive: 10 plays, 62 yards, 3:44; Southern 30–10)

Third quarter

- (10:28) SOU – Miles Dixon 18-yard pass from Christian Johnson, Chris McMcKenna kick (Drive: 8 plays, 66 yards, 4:27; Southern 37–10)
- (9:28) LCHR – Leyton Faul 30-yard pass from Phillip Jones II, Preston Baker kick (Drive: 3 plays, 42 yards, 0:51; Southern 37–17)

Fourth quarter

- (14:29) LCHR – Datlan Cunningham 2-yard run, Preston Baker kick (Drive: 11 plays, 76 yards, 4:08; Southern 37–24)
- (11:22) SOU – Wydell Clark Jr. 5-yard pass from Christian Johnson, Chris McMcKenna kick (Drive: 3 plays, 80 yards, 1:13; Southern 44–24)
- (8:06) SOU – Emeka Iloh 22-yard pass from Christian Johnson (Drive: 4 plays, 14 yards, 2:02; Southern 50–24)
- (6:43) LCHR – Matthew Cates Jr. 69-yard run, Preston Baker kick (Drive: 3 plays, 79 yards, 1:15; Southern 50–31)

Statistics	LCHR	SOU
First downs	18	27
Plays–yards	59–349	73–539
Rushes–yards	39–174	51–367
Passing yards	175	172
Passing: comp–att–int	13–20–1	16–22–0
Turnovers	3	0
Time of possession	22:58	37:02

Team	Category	Player	Statistics
Louisiana Christian	Passing	Bryce Perkins	12/19, 145 yards, TD, INT
Louisiana Christian	Rushing	Matthew Cates Jr.	2 carries, 66 yards, TD
Louisiana Christian	Receiving	Darius Washington	2 receptions, 54 yards, TD
Southern	Passing	Christian Johnson	16/22, 172 yards, 4 TD
Southern	Rushing	Trey Holly	22 carries, 200 yards, 2 TD
Southern	Receiving	Miles Dixon	3 receptions, 47 yards, TD

=== at Jackson State (rivalry) ===
Southern Jaguars (2–2) at Jackson State Tigers (3–0) – Game summary

Quarter	1	2	3	4	Total
Jaguars	0	0	0	0	0
Tigers	0	0	0	0	0

at Mississippi Veterans Memorial Stadium • Jackson, Mississippi

- Date: September 26
- Game time: 6:00 p.m.
- TV: ESPN

Game information

First quarter
Second quarter
Third quarter
Fourth quarter

Statistics	SOU	JKST
First downs		
Plays–yards		
Rushes–yards		
Passing yards		
Passing: comp–att–int		
Turnovers		
Time of possession		

Team	Category	Player	Statistics
Southern	Passing		
Southern	Rushing		
Southern	Receiving		
Jackson State	Passing		
Jackson State	Rushing		
Jackson State	Receiving		

=== Arkansas–Pine Bluff ===
Arkansas–Pine Bluff Golden Lions (2–2) at Southern Jaguars (2–3) – Game summary

Quarter	1	2	3	4	Total
Golden Lions	0	0	0	0	0
Jaguars	0	0	0	0	0

at A.W. Mumford Stadium • Baton Rouge, Louisiana

- Date: October 3
- Game time: 6:00 p.m.
- TV: SWAC TV

Game information

First quarter
Second quarter
Third quarter
Fourth quarter

Statistics	UAPB	SOU
First downs		
Plays–yards		
Rushes–yards		
Passing yards		
Passing: comp–att–int		
Turnovers		
Time of possession		

Team	Category	Player	Statistics
Arkansas–Pine Bluff	Passing		
Arkansas–Pine Bluff	Rushing		
Arkansas–Pine Bluff	Receiving		
Southern	Passing		
Southern	Rushing		
Southern	Receiving		

=== at Prairie View A&M ===
Southern Jaguars (2–4) at Prairie View A&M Panthers (2–4) – Game summary

Quarter	1	2	3	4	Total
Jaguars	0	0	0	0	0
Panthers	0	0	0	0	0

at Panther Stadium • Prairie View, Texas

- Date: October 10
- Game time: 3:00 p.m.
- TV: HBCU Go

Game information

First quarter
Second quarter
Third quarter
Fourth quarter

Statistics	SOU	PV
First downs		
Plays–yards		
Rushes–yards		
Passing yards		
Passing: comp–att–int		
Turnovers		
Time of possession		

Team	Category	Player	Statistics
Southern	Passing		
Southern	Rushing		
Southern	Receiving		
Prairie View A&M	Passing		
Prairie View A&M	Rushing		
Prairie View A&M	Receiving		

=== at Texas Southern ===
Southern Jaguars (3–4) at Texas Southern Tigers (1–5) – Game summary

Quarter	1	2	3	4	Total
Jaguars	0	0	0	0	0
Tigers	0	0	0	0	0

at Reliant Stadium • Houston, Texas

- Date: October 24

Game information

First quarter
Second quarter
Third quarter
Fourth quarter

Statistics	SOU	TXSO
First downs		
Plays–yards		
Rushes–yards		
Passing yards		
Passing: comp–att–int		
Turnovers		
Time of possession		

Team	Category	Player	Statistics
Southern	Passing		
Southern	Rushing		
Southern	Receiving		
Texas Southern	Passing		
Texas Southern	Rushing		
Texas Southern	Receiving		

=== at Florida A&M ===
Southern Jaguars (3–5) at Florida A&M Rattlers (2–6) – Game summary

Quarter	1	2	3	4	Total
Jaguars	0	0	0	0	0
Rattlers	0	0	0	0	0

at Bragg Memorial Stadium • Tallahassee, Florida

- Date: October 31
- Game time: 2:00 p.m.

Game information

First quarter
Second quarter
Third quarter
Fourth quarter

Statistics	SOU	FAMU
First downs		
Plays–yards		
Rushes–yards		
Passing yards		
Passing: comp–att–int		
Turnovers		
Time of possession		

Team	Category	Player	Statistics
Southern	Passing		
Southern	Rushing		
Southern	Receiving		
Florida A&M	Passing		
Florida A&M	Rushing		
Florida A&M	Receiving		

=== Bethune–Cookman ===
Bethune–Cookman Wildcats (5–4) at Southern Jaguars (4–5) – Game summary

Quarter	1	2	3	4	Total
Wildcats	0	0	0	0	0
Jaguars	0	0	0	0	0

at A.W. Mumford Stadium • Baton Rouge, Louisiana

- Date: November 7
- Game time: 2:00 p.m.

Game information

First quarter
Second quarter
Third quarter
Fourth quarter

Statistics	BCU	SOU
First downs		
Plays–yards		
Rushes–yards		
Passing yards		
Passing: comp–att–int		
Turnovers		
Time of possession		

Team	Category	Player	Statistics
Bethune–Cookman	Passing		
Bethune–Cookman	Rushing		
Bethune–Cookman	Receiving		
Southern	Passing		
Southern	Rushing		
Southern	Receiving		

=== Alcorn State ===
Alcorn State Braves (6–4) at Southern Jaguars (5–5) – Game summary

Quarter	1	2	3	4	Total
Braves	0	0	0	0	0
Jaguars	0	0	0	0	0

at A.W. Mumford Stadium • Baton Rouge, Louisiana

- Date: November 14
- Game time: 6:00 p.m.

Game information

First quarter
Second quarter
Third quarter
Fourth quarter

Statistics	ALCN	SOU
First downs		
Plays–yards		
Rushes–yards		
Passing yards		
Passing: comp–att–int		
Turnovers		
Time of possession		

Team	Category	Player	Statistics
Alcorn State	Passing		
Alcorn State	Rushing		
Alcorn State	Receiving		
Southern	Passing		
Southern	Rushing		
Southern	Receiving		

=== vs. Grambling State (Bayou Classic) ===
Southern Jaguars (6–5) vs. Grambling State Tigers (5–5) – Game summary

Quarter	1	2	3	4	Total
Panthers	0	0	0	0	0
Tigers	0	0	0	0	0

at Caesars Superdome • New Orleans, Louisiana

- Date: November 28

Game information

First quarter
Second quarter
Third quarter
Fourth quarter

Statistics	SOU	GRAM
First downs		
Plays–yards		
Rushes–yards		
Passing yards		
Passing: comp–att–int		
Turnovers		
Time of possession		

Team	Category	Player	Statistics
Southern	Passing		
Southern	Rushing		
Southern	Receiving		
Grambling State	Passing		
Grambling State	Rushing		
Grambling State	Receiving		
