= Elija Lofton =

American football player

No. 9 – Miami Hurricanes
- Position: Tight end
- Class: Junior

Personal information
- Listed height: 6 ft 3 in (1.91 m)
- Listed weight: 242 lb (110 kg)

Career information
- High school: Bishop Gorman (Las Vegas, Nevada)
- College: Miami (2024–present)
- Stats at ESPN

Elija Lofton is an American college football tight end for the Miami Hurricanes.

== Early life ==
Lofton attended Bishop Gorman High School in Las Vegas, Nevada. He had 30 receptions for 756 yards and 11 touchdowns his junior year and 29 receptions for 594 yards with 10 touchdowns as a senior. He committed to the University of Miami to play college football.

== College career ==
As a true freshman at Miami in 2024, Lofton played in all 13 games and had nine receptions for 150 yards and one touchdown. He returned to Miami for his sophomore year in 2025.
