= Mike Viti =

American football player (born 1998)

Miami Hurricanes
- Title: Tight ends coach

Personal information
- Born: October 14, 1985 (age 41)
- Listed height: 5 ft 9 in (1.75 m)
- Listed weight: 236 lb (107 kg)

Career information
- Position: Running back
- High school: Berwick (Columbia County, Pennsylvania)
- College: Army (2004–2007)
- NFL draft: 2008: undrafted

Career history

Playing
- Buffalo Bills (2008)*
- * Offseason or practice squad member only

Coaching
- Army (2016–2025); Fullbacks coach (2016–2021); Offensive line coach (2022–2025); Miami (FL) (2026–present) Tight ends coach

Awards and highlights
- AFCA Assistant Coach of the Year (2019); Armed Forces Merit Award (2019)

Michael Allan Viti, Jr. (born October 14, 1985) is an American football coach and former player. He is currently the tight ends coach for the Miami Hurricanes. He played college football for the Army Black Knights as a running back.

== Early life ==
Michael Allan Viti, Jr. was born on October 14, 1985. He played high school football at Berwick Area Senior High School in Columbia County, Pennsylvania.

== College career ==
Viti was a four-year letterman for the Army Black Knights from 2004 to 2007. He recorded career totals of 91 carries for 321 yards and three touchdowns, and 30 receptions for 198 yards.

== Professional career ==
After going undrafted in the 2008 NFL draft, Viti signed with the Buffalo Bills on May 2, 2008. He was released on July 1, 2008. During the War in Afghanistan, he was a platoon leader in a combat zone.

== Coaching career ==
Viti was the fullbacks coach for the Army Black Knights from 2016 to 2021, and the offensive line coach from 2022 to 2025. He was also the associate head coach in 2025.

In March 2026, Viti became the Miami Hurricanes' tight ends coach.
