= Daylyn Upshaw =

American football player

No. 7 – Miami Hurricanes
- Position: Wide receiver
- Class: Sophomore

Personal information
- Listed height: 6 ft 0 in (1.83 m)
- Listed weight: 195 lb (88 kg)

Career information
- High school: Central (Phenix City, Alabama)
- College: Miami (2025–present)
- Stats at ESPN

Daylyn Upshaw is an American football wide receiver for the Miami Hurricanes.

== Early life ==
Upshaw attended Central High School in Phenix City, Alabama. As a junior he caught 59 passes for 1,185 yards 15 touchdowns. As a senior, Upshaw notched 62 receptions for 1,008 yards and 16 touchdowns. He was rated as a four-star recruit by 247Sports and committed to play college football for the Miami Hurricanes over offers from Alabama, Auburn, Florida, Florida State, Georgia, Texas, and UCF.

== College career ==
As a freshman in 2025, Upshaw caught seven passes for 105 yards in six games. He entered the 2026 season competing for a starting position.
