= Javian Mallory =

American college football running back (born 2007)

No. 21 – Miami Hurricanes
- Position: Running back
- Class: Freshman

Personal information
- Born: May 17, 2007 (age 19)
- Listed height: 5 ft 11 in (1.80 m)
- Listed weight: 210 lb (95 kg)

Career information
- High school: West Boca (Boca Raton, Florida)
- College: Miami (FL) (2026–present)
- Stats at ESPN

Javian Mallory (born May 17, 2007) is an American college football running back for the Miami Hurricanes.

== Early life ==
Mallory grew up in Fort Lauderdale, Florida, his uncle serves as an officer for the Broward County Sheriff’s Office at Pompano Beach High School. Mallory attended West Boca Raton Community High School where he competed in football and track and field. He served as the team's starting running back and played alongside his cousin who served as starting quarterback. Mallory recorded 1,425 rushing yards and 18 touchdowns, along with 438 receiving yards and six touchdowns, as a sophomore, earning Palm Beach 4M-3M offensive player of the year honors.

Mallory only ran for 676 yards and 10 touchdowns as a junior as he missed significant time due to injury. He was part of a team that won the state title, although he did not play in the game. As a senior, he totaled 1,258 rushing yards and 18 touchdowns while helping West Boca Raton to another state championship. Mallory ran for 117 yards and three touchdowns in the championship and was named the game's MVP. He was named the Palm Beach 7A-5A offensive player of the year for his performance. A four-star recruit, and ranked a top-30 running back nationally by 247Sports, Mallory committed to play college football for the Miami Hurricanes.

== College career ==
In the second game of the 2026 season, Mallory ran for 142 yards and two touchdowns in a win against Florida A&M.

=== Statistics ===
Year	Team	Games		Rushing				Receiving			
Year	Team	GP	GS	Att	Yds	Avg	TD	Rec	Yds	Avg	TD
2026	Miami	10	1	84	580	6.9	9	10	143	14.3	1
Career		10	1	84	580	6.9	9	10	143	14.3	1

== Personal life ==
Mallory's uncle, Rich Alexis is a former NFL running back.
