= West Boca Raton Community High School =

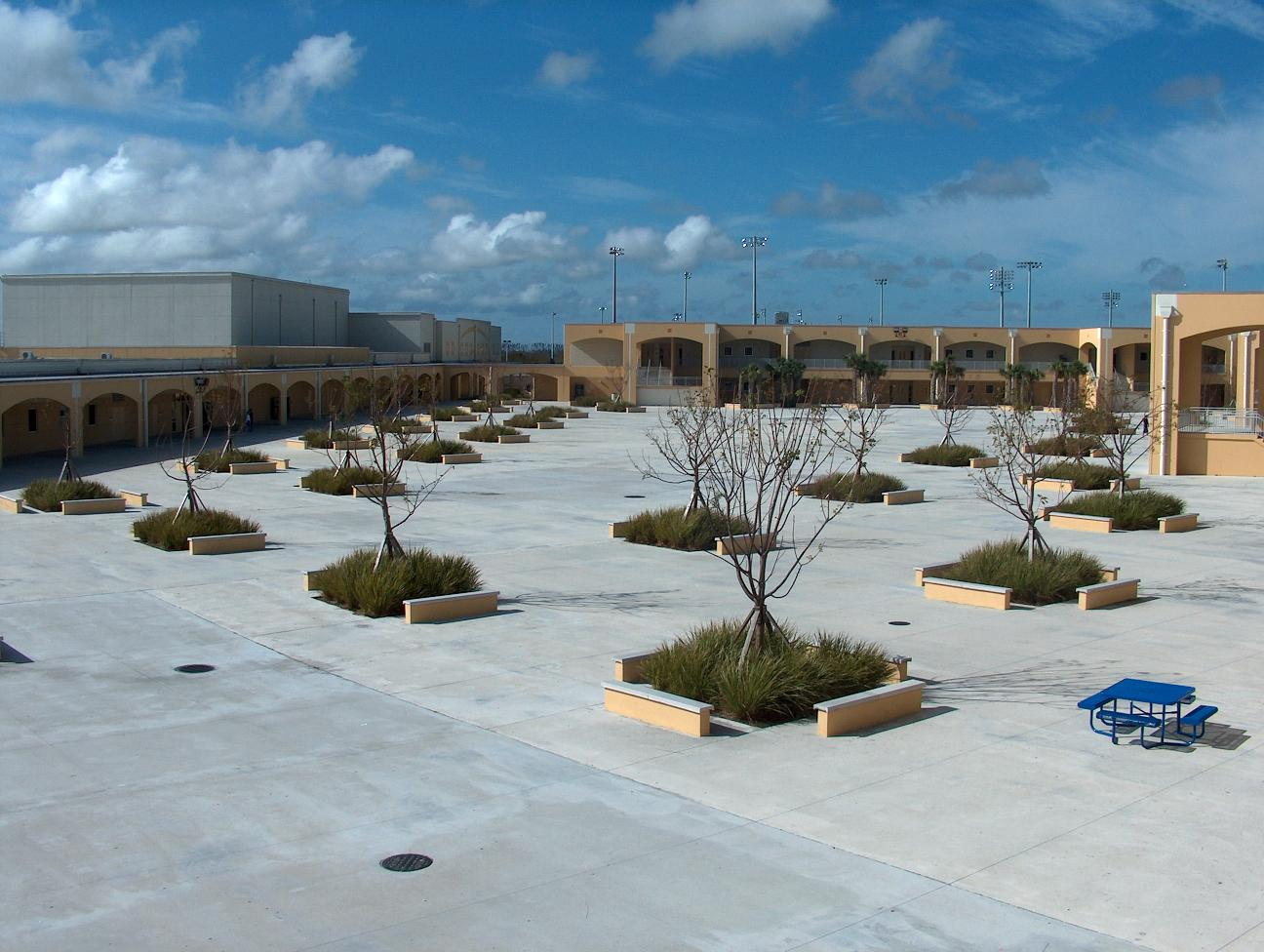
- Campus of West Boca Raton High School

Location
- 12811 Glades Road; Boca Raton, Florida 33498; United States; 26°21′44″N 80°14′54″W

Information
- Other names: West Boca Raton; West Boca Raton High; West Boca Raton High School; West Boca High School
- Type: Magnet high school
- Established: 2004
- School district: School District of Palm Beach County
- NCES School ID: 120150004026
- Principal: Edmund Capitano
- Teaching staff: 114.50 (on an FTE basis)
- Grades: 9–12
- Enrollment: 2,271 (2022-2023)
- Student to teacher ratio: 19.83
- Colors: Navy, tan, white
- Mascot: Bull
- Nickname: Bulls
- Website: wbrh.palmbeachschools.org

West Boca Raton Community High School (WBRCHS) is a magnet high school in Boca Raton, Florida, United States. It was established in 2004 and is part of the School District of Palm Beach County. The school primarily serves students from the western unincorporated part of Boca Raton known as West Boca Raton.

== History ==
In 2003, the Palm Beach County School Board named a planned new high school, "West Boca Raton Community High School." The school building was constructed by James Pirtle Construction Inc. of Davie at a cost of $46 million. Construction progress was featured on the district's construction project Web site.

WBRCHS opened in 2004 with three initial magnet academies: information technology, culinary arts, and drafting and design. Refuting rumors the school would be vocational, Principal Fran Giblin described the curriculum as "a comprehensive school that has the same offerings as other high schools in the county", with "honors and advanced-placement courses as well as band, art, athletics and offerings typical of any other high school".

In 2007, the National Career Academy and the Association for Career and Technical Education ranked the WBRCHS Culinary Arts Academy as a Model Academy. The ranking is based on "mission, structure, faculty, leadership, curriculum, and community involvement".

By 2014, the Academy of Medical Sciences was added to the curriculum, and in 2015, the Academy of Performing Arts was added, offering "theater, musical theater and instrumental music, drama", with dance to be added later.

The Boca Raton Tribune wrote there is an "Aviation Academy planned for West Boca High School in 2023".

The School District of Palm Beach County said in 2022 that the graduation rate for WBRCHS was 98%.

Awarded by the Florida Department of Education, WBRCHS is a Five Star School of Excellence.

=== Events ===
==== Speed zone ====
In 2011 the county's traffic division established a speed zone on Glades Road in front of WBRCHS. In 2014, two pedestrians were struck by a vehicle in front of the school.

==== Band invited to London ====
London's former Lord Mayor of Westminster Duncan Sandys in 2015 invited the WBRCHS band to perform in London's New Year's Day Parade.

==== Football ====
On November 10, 2023, West Boca Raton Community High School won their first playoff game in program history. They defeated Atlantic Community High School on a last-second touchdown catch, by a score of 23 – 22. In the 2024 season, the Bulls finished the season undefeated, winning the FHSAA 6A State Championships against Osceola High School, and becoming the #1 team in the county and one of the best in the state, ranked in the top 20.

==== Cross Country ====
On October 30, 2024, West Boca Raton Community High School participated in the 4A District 4 Cross Country Championship in Palm Beach County, hosted in South County Regional Park. The boys' team made the top 8 out of 15 competing teams, qualifying for regionals for the very first time in school history. The team competed at regionals on November 10, 2024.

==== Controversy ====
Former principal Mark Stenner admitted plagiarizing graduation speeches from YouTube in 2015. He apologized and was relieved of his office.

==== Walkout ====
"Our principal told us we can protest, but keep it in the school," said sophomore Zach Coey. "But who's going to hear our voices there?" And the principal, Craig Sommer, ended up walking with the kids.

Following the shootings at Marjory Stoneman Douglas High in February 2018, WBRCHS students observed 17 minutes of silence to honor the fallen students there. Then 90% of the student body walked out, marching 12 miles to the Parkland school. According to The Palm Beach Post, they marched from "...9:30 a.m. until reaching the northeast corner of Douglas High at 2 p.m. They were met by a crowd of Douglas High students and neighbors who cheered in support... Some at Olympic Heights in Boca Raton and Palm Beach Central in Wellington walked out Tuesday, although the crowds were far smaller than West Boca's."

The walkout drew local and national attention.

== Notable alumni ==
- Javian Mallory, college football running back for the Miami Hurricanes
- Nathalia Filgueiras, who made headlines in 2023 when she gained a pilot's licence age 17 while still at the school, was one of the crew of a Lear Jet lost with all souls in the 2026 Palm Beach County Learjet 60 crash.
