= 2026 Miami RedHawks football team =

American college football season

2026 Miami RedHawks football
- Conference: Mid-American Conference
- Record: 7–4 (5–2 MAC)
- Head coach: Chuck Martin (13th season)
- Associate head coach: James Patton (5th season)
- Defensive coordinator: Bill Brechin (5th season)
- Home stadium: Yager Stadium

2026 Mid-American Conference football standings
| | Conf. | | | Overall |
| Team | W | | L | W | | L |
|---|---|---|---|---|---|---|
| Ohio | 6 | – | 1 | 8 | – | 3 |
| Western Michigan | 6 | – | 1 | 8 | – | 3 |
| Buffalo | 6 | – | 1 | 8 | – | 3 |
| Toledo | 5 | – | 1 | 8 | – | 2 |
| Miami (OH) | 5 | – | 2 | 7 | – | 4 |
| Bowling Green | 3 | – | 3 | 3 | – | 7 |
| Central Michigan | 3 | – | 4 | 5 | – | 6 |
| Eastern Michigan | 3 | – | 4 | 4 | – | 7 |
| UMass | 2 | – | 5 | 5 | – | 6 |
| Kent State | 2 | – | 5 | 3 | – | 8 |
| Ball State | 2 | – | 5 | 3 | – | 8 |
| Akron | 1 | – | 6 | 2 | – | 9 |
| Sacramento State | 1 | – | 7 | 2 | – | 9 |
Championship: December 5, 2026
As of November 19, 2026; Rankings from AP poll

The 2026 Miami RedHawks football team is who represents Miami University in the Mid-American Conference (MAC) during the 2026 NCAA Division I FBS football season. The RedHawks are led by Chuck Martin in his thirteenth year as the head coach. The RedHawks play their home games on campus at Yager Stadium, located in Oxford, Ohio.

== Schedule ==
| Date | Time | Opponent | Site | TV | Result | Attendance |
|---|---|---|---|---|---|---|
| September 5 | 12:30 p.m. | at Pittsburgh* | Acrisure Stadium; Pittsburgh, PA | The CW | L 14–59 | 43,929 |
| September 12 | 1:00 p.m. | Holy Cross* | Yager Stadium; Oxford, OH | ESPN+ | W 45–7 | 11,126 |
| September 19 | 3:30 p.m. | at Cincinnati* | TQL Stadium; Cincinnati, OH (Victory Bell) | ESPN+ | L 31–35 | 19,188 |
| September 26 | 3:30 p.m. | UConn*^{†} | Yager Stadium; Oxford, OH | ESPN+ | W 24–21 | 18,180 |
| October 3 | 3:30 p.m. | Bowling Green | Yager Stadium; Oxford, OH | ESPN+ | L 20–24 | 12,474 |
| October 10 | 2:00 p.m. | at UMass | Warren McGuirk Alumni Stadium; Hadley, MA | ESPN+ | W 20–19 | 13,887 |
| October 17 | 3:30 p.m. | Akron | Yager Stadium; Oxford, OH | ESPN+ | W 34–14 | 18,515 |
| October 24 | 1:00 p.m. | at Central Michigan | Kelly/Shorts Stadium; Mount Pleasant, MI | ESPN+ | W 28–27 | 13,269 |
| November 3 | 8:00 p.m. | Buffalo | Yager Stadium; Oxford, OH | ESPN | L 31–34 ^{OT} | 10,618 |
| November 10 | 8:00 p.m. | Ohio | Yager Stadium; Oxford, OH (Battle of the Bricks) | ESPN2 | W 34–17 | 17,156 |
| November 17 | 7:00 p.m. | at Kent State | Dix Stadium; Kent, OH | ESPNU | W 20–3 | 8,185 |
| November 24 | 7:00 p.m. | at Western Michigan | Waldo Stadium; Kalamazoo, MI | ESPN2 | – | |
*Non-conference game; ^{†}Homecoming; All times are in Eastern time; Source:

== Game summaries ==
=== at Pittsburgh ===
Miami RedHawks (0–0) at Pittsburgh Panthers (0–0) – Game summary

| Quarter | 1 | 2 | 3 | 4 | Total |
|---|---|---|---|---|---|
| RedHawks | 0 | 14 | 0 | 0 | 14 |
| Panthers | 21 | 10 | 21 | 7 | 59 |

at Acrisure Stadium • Pittsburgh, Pennsylvania

- Date: September 5
- Game time: 12:30 pm
- Game weather: Cloudy • Temperature: 76 °F (24 °C) • Wind: NW at 6 miles per hour (9.7 km/h)
- Game attendance: 43,929
- Referee: Riley Johnson
- TV announcers (The CW): Thom Brennaman, Jason Cabinda and Wes Bryant

Game information

First quarter

- PITT – Malik Knight 17-yard pass from Mason Heintschel (Antonio Chadha kick), 10:06. Panthers 7–0. Drive: 8 plays, 80 yards, 4:00.
- PITT – Justin Cook 50-yard run (Antonio Chadha kick), 4:55. Panthers 14–0. Drive: 7 plays, 89 yards, 3:21.
- PITT – Elijah Lagg 5-yard pass from Mason Heintschel (Antonio Chadha kick), 0:09. Panthers 21–0. Drive: 7 plays, 50 yards, 3:45.

Second quarter

- M-OH – D'Shawntae Jones 1-yard run (Kellan McLaughlin kick), 10:29. Panthers 21–7. Drive: 11 plays, 75 yards, 4:40.
- PITT – Ja'Kyrian Turner 45-yard pass from Mason Heintschel (Antonio Chadha kick), 4:44. Panthers 28–7. Drive: 1 play, 45 yards, 0:11.
- M-OH – Damarion Witten 75-yard pass from David McComb (Kellan McLaughlin kick), 4:34. Panthers 28–14. Drive: 1 play, 75 yards, 0:10.
- PITT – Antonio Chadha 58-yard field goal, 0:00. Panthers 31–14. Drive: 11 plays, 41 yards, 1:01.

Third quarter

- PITT – Cataurus Hicks 53-yard pass from Mason Heintschel (Antonio Chadha kick), 13:26. Panthers 38–14. Drive: 5 plays, 75 yards, 1:34.
- PITT – Censere Lee 35-yard pass from Mason Heintschel (Antonio Chadha kick), 7:43. Panthers 45–14. Drive: 8 plays, 76 yards, 4:05.
- PITT – Bryce Yates 27-yard pass from Mason Heintschel (Antonio Chadha kick), 5:24. Panthers 52–14. Drive: 4 plays, 63 yards, 1:26.

Fourth quarter

- PITT – Damon Ferguson Jr. 15-yard pass from Mason Heintschel (Sam Hunsaker kick), 9:48. Panthers 59–14. Drive: 11 plays, 87 yards, 6:31.

| Statistics | M-OH | PITT |
|---|---|---|
| First downs | 14 | 33 |
| Plays–yards | 58–289 | 75–646 |
| Rushes–yards | 21–28 | 31–166 |
| Passing yards | 261 | 480 |
| Passing: comp–att–int | 19–37–1 | 34–44–0 |
| Turnovers | 1 | 0 |
| Time of possession | 26:04 | 33:56 |

| Team | Category | Player | Statistics |
|---|---|---|---|
| Miami (OH) | Passing | David McComb | 16/33, 240 yards, TD |
| Miami (OH) | Rushing | Lazaro Rogers | 6 carries, 21 yards |
| Miami (OH) | Receiving | Damarion Witten | 2 receptions, 90 yards, TD |
| Pittsburgh | Passing | Mason Heintschel | 31/41, 453 yards, 7 TD |
| Pittsburgh | Rushing | Justin Cook | 1 carry, 50 yards, TD |
| Pittsburgh | Receiving | Cataurus Hicks | 5 receptions, 114 yards, TD |

=== Holy Cross (FCS) ===
Holy Cross Crusaders (FCS) (0–2) at Miami (OH) RedHawks (0–1) – Game summary

| Quarter | 1 | 2 | 3 | 4 | Total |
|---|---|---|---|---|---|
| Crusaders (FCS) | 0 | 0 | 7 | 0 | 7 |
| RedHawks | 14 | 28 | 3 | 0 | 45 |

at Yager Stadium • Oxford, Ohio

- Date: September 12
- Game time: 1:00 p.m.
- Game weather: Rain • Temperature: 76 °F (24 °C) • Wind: N at 4 miles per hour (6.4 km/h)
- Game attendance: 11,126
- Referee: Billy Williams
- TV announcers (ESPN+): Eric Rothman and Brad Hopkins

Game information

First quarter

- M-OH – David McComb 3-yard run (Kellan McLaughlin kick), 9:31. RedHawks 7–0. Drive: 7 plays, 58 yards, 3:52.
- M-OH – Christian Ross 34-yard pass from David McComb (Kellan McLaughlin kick), 2:16. RedHawks 14–0. Drive: 8 plays, 75 yards, 4:45.

Second quarter

- M-OH – D'Shawntae Jones 2-yard run (Kellan McLaughlin kick), 13:35. RedHawks 21–0. Drive: 5 plays, 54 yards, 2:44.
- M-OH – Damarion Witten 10-yard pass from David McComb (Kellan McLaughlin kick), 10:31. RedHawks 28–0. Drive: 3 plays, 58 yards, 1:33.
- M-OH – Leo Colombi 28-yard blocked punt return (Kellan McLaughlin kick), 8:26. RedHawks 35–0.
- M-OH – Lynel Billups-Williams 28-yard pass from David McComb (Kellan McLaughlin kick), 1:11. RedHawks 42–0. Drive: 6 plays, 77 yards, 3:18.

Third quarter

- M-OH – Kellan McLaughlin 24-yard field goal, 5:25. RedHawks 45–0. Drive: 14 plays, 69 yards, 9:35.
- HC – Lincoln Fisher 15-yard pass from David Lynch (Owen Saraceno kick), 0:30. RedHawks 45–7. Drive: 9 plays, 75 yards, 4:55.

Fourth quarter

- No scoring plays.

| Statistics | HC | M-OH |
|---|---|---|
| First downs | 10 | 25 |
| Plays–yards | 44–181 | 54–437 |
| Rushes–yards | 19–40 | 39–201 |
| Passing yards | 141 | 236 |
| Passing: comp–att–int | 13–25–0 | 14–15–0 |
| Turnovers | 0 | 0 |
| Time of possession | 21:41 | 38:19 |

| Team | Category | Player | Statistics |
|---|---|---|---|
| Holy Cross | Passing | David Lynch | 13/25, 141 yards, TD |
| Holy Cross | Rushing | Datrell Jones | 3 carries, 18 yards |
| Holy Cross | Receiving | SirCharles Gordon | 3 receptions, 54 yards |
| Miami (OH) | Passing | David McComb | 13/13, 234 yards, 3 TD |
| Miami (OH) | Rushing | D'Shawntae Jones | 7 carries, 47 yards, TD |
| Miami (OH) | Receiving | Lynel Billups-Williams | 4 receptions, 73 yards, TD |

=== vs. Cincinnati (Victory Bell) ===
Miami (OH) RedHawks (1–1) vs. Cincinnati Bearcats (2–0) – Game summary

| Quarter | 1 | 2 | 3 | 4 | Total |
|---|---|---|---|---|---|
| RedHawks | 14 | 14 | 0 | 3 | 31 |
| Bearcats | 7 | 0 | 14 | 14 | 35 |

at TQL Stadium • Cincinnati, Ohio

- Date: September 19
- Game time: 3:30 p.m.
- Game weather: Sunny • Temperature: 87 °F (31 °C) • Wind: S at 7 miles per hour (11 km/h)
- Game attendance: 21,045
- Referee: Chris La Grange
- TV announcers (ESPN+): Pete Sousa (play-by-play), Leger Douzable (analyst), and Sydney Jones (sideline)

Game information

First quarter

- M-OH – Scoop Smith 98-yard kickoff return (Kellan McLaughlin kick), 14:46. RedHawks 7–0.
- M-OH – Lazaro Smith 12-yard run (Kellan McLaughlin kick), 10:53. RedHawks 14–0. Drive: 4 plays, 67 yards, 2:02.
- CIN – Cole Tabb 1-yard run (Stephen Rusnak kick), 6:07. RedHawks 14–7. Drive: 10 plays, 75 yards, 4:46.

Second quarter

- M-OH – David McComb 6-yard run (Kellan McLaughlin kick), 5:52. RedHawks 21–7. Drive: 10 plays, 91 yards, 6:20.
- M-OH – Maleek Huggins 36-yard pass from David McComb (Kellan McLaughlin kick), 0:21. RedHawks 28–7. Drive: 6 plays, 65 yards, 1:34.

Third quarter

- CIN – JC French IV 1-yard run (Stephen Rusnak kick), 7:27. RedHawks 28–14. Drive: 8 plays, 80 yards, 3:27.
- CIN – Cole Tabb 8-yard pass from JC French IV (Stephen Rusnak kick), 2:44. RedHawks 28–21. Drive: 7 plays, 31 yards, 3:12.

Fourth quarter

- M-OH – Kellan McLaughlin 19-yard field goal, 13:51. RedHawks 31–21. Drive: 8 plays, 74 yards, 3:53.
- CIN – JV Gibson 6-yard pass from JC French IV (Stephen Rusnak kick), 6:20. RedHawks 31–28. Drive: 9 plays, 73 yards, 4:30.
- CIN – Cole Tabb 53-yard run (Stephen Rusnak kick), 1:29. Bearcats 35–31. Drive: 7 plays, 85 yards, 2:17.

| Statistics | M-OH | CIN |
|---|---|---|
| First downs | 20 | 25 |
| Total yards | 410 | 446 |
| Rushes–yards | 28–76 | 33–137 |
| Passing yards | 334 | 309 |
| Passing: comp–att–int | 17–28–1 | 31–43–0 |
| Turnovers | 2 | 1 |
| Time of possession | 26:34 | 33:26 |

| Team | Category | Player | Statistics |
|---|---|---|---|
| Miami (OH) | Passing | David McComb | 17/28, 334 yards, TD, INT |
| Miami (OH) | Rushing | Rodney Nelson | 7 carries, 32 yards |
| Miami (OH) | Receiving | Maleek Huggins | 4 receptions, 128 yards, TD |
| Cincinnati | Passing | JC French IV | 31/43, 309 yards, 2 TD |
| Cincinnati | Rushing | Cole Tabb | 6 carries, 78 yards, 2 TD |
| Cincinnati | Receiving | JV Gibson | 7 receptions, 68 yards, TD |

=== UConn ===
UConn Huskies (2–1) at Miami RedHawks (1–2) – Game summary

| Quarter | 1 | 2 | 3 | 4 | Total |
|---|---|---|---|---|---|
| Huskies | 14 | 0 | 7 | 0 | 21 |
| RedHawks | 0 | 17 | 7 | 3 | 27 |

at Yager Stadium • Oxford, Ohio

- Date: September 26
- Game time: 3:30 p.m.
- Game weather: Sunny • Temperature: 70 °F (21 °C) • Wind: SW at 8 miles per hour (13 km/h)
- Game attendance: 18,180
- Referee: Rich Edwards
- TV announcers (ESPN+): Shawn Kenney and Marcus Ray

Game information

First quarter

- CONN - Brown, Javon 7 yd pass from Osborne, Kalieb (O'Connor, Jack kick), 11:04. Huskies 7–0. Drive: 8 plays, 75 yards, TOP 03:56
- CONN - Osborne, Kalieb 38 yd run (O'Connor, Jack kick), 6:23. Huskies 14–0. Drive: 8 plays, 84 yards, TOP 03:38

Second quarter

- MIA - McComb, David 10 yd run (McLaughlin, Kellan kick), 6:08. Huskies 14–7. Drive: 8 plays, 90 yards, TOP 04:46
- MIA - Loftus, Brendan 57 yd pass from McComb, David (McLaughlin, Kellan kick), 1:50. Tied 14–14. Drive: 4 plays, 87 yards, TOP 01:17

Third quarter

- MIA - Smith, Scoop 11 yd pass from McComb, David (McLaughlin, Kellan kick), 3:48. RedHawks 21–14. Drive: 9 plays, 83 yards, TOP 04:23
- CONN - Bowers, Cyncir 1 yd run (O'Connor, Jack kick), 0:49. Tied 21–21. Drive: 5 plays, 64 yards, TOP 02:52

Fourth quarter

- MIA - Stidham, Brady 33 yd field goal, 1:58. RedHawks 24–21. Drive: 11 plays, 28 yards, TOP 06:49

| Statistics | CONN | M-OH |
|---|---|---|
| First downs | 17 | 20 |
| Plays–yards | 62–377 | 61–414 |
| Rushes–yards | 30–162 | 29–89 |
| Passing yards | 215 | 325 |
| Passing: comp–att–int | 17–32–1 | 22–32–0 |
| Turnovers | 2 | 1 |
| Time of possession | 27:18 | 32:42 |

| Team | Category | Player | Statistics |
|---|---|---|---|
| UConn | Passing | Kalieb Osborne | 17/32, 215 yards, TD |
| UConn | Rushing | Kalieb Osborne | 13 carries, 84 yards, TD |
| UConn | Receiving | Shamar Porter | 2 receptions, 61 yards |
| Miami (OH) | Passing | David McComb | 19/29, 312 yards, 2 TD |
| Miami (OH) | Rushing | David McComb | 3 carries, 33 yards, TD |
| Miami (OH) | Receiving | Brendan Loftus | 3 receptions, 72 yards, TD |

=== Bowling Green ===
Bowling Green Falcons (0–4) at Miami RedHawks (2–2) – Game summary

| Quarter | 1 | 2 | 3 | 4 | Total |
|---|---|---|---|---|---|
| Falcons | 0 | 10 | 0 | 14 | 24 |
| RedHawks | 0 | 6 | 3 | 11 | 20 |

at Yager Stadium • Oxford, Ohio

- Date: October 3
- Game time: 3:30 p.m.
- Game weather: Sunny • Temperautre: 69 °F (21 °C) • Wind: W 12 mph
- Game attendance: 12,474
- Referee: Matt Packowski
- TV announcers (ESPN+): Doug Sherman and Forest Conoly

Game information

First quarter

No scoring plays

Second quarter

- M-OH – Kellan McLaughlin 24-yard field goal, 9:05. RedHawks 3–0. Drive: 12 plays, 55 yards, 6:29.
- BGSU – Nakai Amachree 64-yard pass from Jay Kastantin (Travis Kenner kick), 6:57. Falcons 7–3. Drive: 3 plays, 80 yards, 2:03.
- BGSU – Travis Kenner 38-yard field goal, 1:06. Falcons 10–3. Drive: 9 plays, 60 yards, 2:46.
- M-OH – Kellan McLaughlin 41-yard field goal, 0:00. Falcons 10–6. Drive: 6 plays, 45 yards, 1:05.

Third quarter

- M-OH – Kellan McLaughlin 40-yard field goal, 1:45. Falcons 10–9. Drive: 4 plays, -2 yards, 1:54.

Fourth quarter

- BGSU – Eli Jacon-Duffy 14-yard pass from Jay Kastantin (Travis Kenner kick), 13:25. Falcons 17–9. Drive: 6 plays, 75 yards, 3:20.
- M-OH – Lynel Billups-Williams 10-yard pass from Caleb Heavner (Caleb Heavner pass to Brach Rice), 8:50. Tied 17–17. Drive: 8 plays, 81 yards, 4:28.
- M-OH – Kellan McLaughlin 28-yard field goal, 1:47. RedHawks 20–17. Drive: 7 plays, 57 yards, 2:30.
- BGSU – Leo Kemp 2-yard run (Travis Kenner kick), 0:08. Falcons 24–20. Drive: 10 plays, 75 yards, 1:39.

| Statistics | BGSU | M-OH |
|---|---|---|
| First downs | 22 | 20 |
| Plays–yards | 60–367 | 59–306 |
| Rushes–yards | 23–62 | 35–108 |
| Passing yards | 305 | 198 |
| Passing: comp–att–int | 25–37–0 | 17–24–0 |
| Turnovers | 0 | 0 |
| Time of possession | 27:18 | 32:42 |

| Team | Category | Player | Statistics |
|---|---|---|---|
| Bowling Green | Passing | Jay Kastantin | 25/37, 305 yards, 2 TD |
| Bowling Green | Rushing | Leo Kemp | 3 carries, 25 yards, TD |
| Bowling Green | Receiving | Brennan Ridley | 9 receptions, 95 yards |
| Miami (OH) | Passing | Caleb Heavner | 17/24, 198 yards, TD |
| Miami (OH) | Rushing | Rodney Nelson | 16 carries, 70 yards |
| Miami (OH) | Receiving | Lynel Billups-Williams | 4 receptions, 75 yards, TD |

=== at UMass ===
Miami RedHawks (2–3) at UMass Minutemen (4–1) – Game summary

| Quarter | 1 | 2 | 3 | 4 | Total |
|---|---|---|---|---|---|
| RedHawks | 0 | 0 | 0 | 0 | 0 |
| Minutemen | 0 | 0 | 0 | 0 | 0 |

at Warren McGuirk Alumni Stadium • Hadley, Massachusetts

- Date: October 10
- Game time: 2:00 p.m.
- Game attendance: 13,887
- TV: ESPN+

| Statistics | M-OH | MASS |
|---|---|---|
| First downs | | |
| Total yards | | |
| Rushing yards | | |
| Passing yards | | |
| Passing: Comp–Att–Int | | |
| Turnovers | | |
| Time of possession | | |

| Team | Category | Player | Statistics |
|---|---|---|---|
| Miami (OH) | Passing | | |
| Miami (OH) | Rushing | | |
| Miami (OH) | Receiving | | |
| UMass | Passing | | |
| UMass | Rushing | | |
| UMass | Receiving | | |

=== Akron ===
Akron Zips (1–5) at Miami RedHawks (3–3) – Game summary

| Quarter | 1 | 2 | 3 | 4 | Total |
|---|---|---|---|---|---|
| Zips | 0 | 0 | 0 | 0 | 0 |
| RedHawks | 0 | 0 | 0 | 0 | 0 |

at Yager Stadium • Oxford, Ohio

- Date: October 17
- Game time: 3:30 p.m.
- TV: ESPN+

| Statistics | AKR | M-OH |
|---|---|---|
| First downs | | |
| Plays–yards | | |
| Rushes–yards | | |
| Passing yards | | |
| Passing: comp–att–int | | |
| Turnovers | | |
| Time of possession | | |

| Team | Category | Player | Statistics |
|---|---|---|---|
| Akron | Passing | | |
| Akron | Rushing | | |
| Akron | Receiving | | |
| Miami (OH) | Passing | | |
| Miami (OH) | Rushing | | |
| Miami (OH) | Receiving | | |

=== at Central Michigan ===
Miami RedHawks (4–3) at Central Michigan Chippewas (3–4) – Game summary

| Quarter | 1 | 2 | 3 | 4 | Total |
|---|---|---|---|---|---|
| RedHawks | 0 | 0 | 0 | 0 | 0 |
| Chippewas | 0 | 0 | 0 | 0 | 0 |

at Kelly/Shorts Stadium • Mount Pleasant, Michigan

- Date: October 24
- Game time: 1:00 p.m.
- TV: ESPN+

| Statistics | M-OH | CMU |
|---|---|---|
| First downs | | |
| Total yards | | |
| Rushing yards | | |
| Passing yards | | |
| Passing: Comp–Att–Int | | |
| Turnovers | | |
| Time of possession | | |

| Team | Category | Player | Statistics |
|---|---|---|---|
| Miami (OH) | Passing | | |
| Miami (OH) | Rushing | | |
| Miami (OH) | Receiving | | |
| Central Michigan | Passing | | |
| Central Michigan | Rushing | | |
| Central Michigan | Receiving | | |

=== Buffalo ===
Buffalo Bulls (5–3) at Miami RedHawks (5–3) – Game summary

| Quarter | 1 | 2 | 3 | 4 | Total |
|---|---|---|---|---|---|
| Bulls | 0 | 0 | 0 | 0 | 0 |
| RedHawks | 0 | 0 | 0 | 0 | 0 |

at Yager Stadium • Oxford, Ohio

- Date: November 3
- Game time: 8:00 P.M.
- TV announcers (ESPN): Clay Matvick play by play and Rocky Boiman analyst

| Statistics | BUFF | M-OH |
|---|---|---|
| First downs | | |
| Plays–yards | | |
| Rushes–yards | | |
| Passing yards | | |
| Passing: comp–att–int | | |
| Turnovers | | |
| Time of possession | | |

| Team | Category | Player | Statistics |
|---|---|---|---|
| Buffalo | Passing | | |
| Buffalo | Rushing | | |
| Buffalo | Receiving | | |
| Miami (OH) | Passing | | |
| Miami (OH) | Rushing | | |
| Miami (OH) | Receiving | | |

=== Ohio (Battle of the Bricks) ===
Ohio Bobcats (7–2) at Miami RedHawks (5–4) – Game summary

| Quarter | 1 | 2 | 3 | 4 | Total |
|---|---|---|---|---|---|
| Bobcats | 7 | 10 | 0 | 0 | 17 |
| RedHawks | 0 | 7 | 7 | 20 | 34 |

at Yager Stadium • Oxford, Ohio

- Date: November 10
- Game time: 8:00 P.M. EST
- Game weather: clear, Temperature:54 °F (12 °C), Wind: E 5 mph (8.0 km/h)
- Game attendance: 17,156
- Referee: Rick Warne
- TV announcers (ESPN2): Clay Matvick (play-by-play) and Rocky Boiman (analyst)

Game information

First quarter

- (10:05) OHIO – Riley Neer 8-yard pass from Nick Poulos (Brack Peacock kick) (Drive: 8 plays, 75 yards, 4:55, Ohio 7–0)

Second quarter

- (11:01) OHIO – Duncan Brune 8-yard run (Brack Peacock kick) (Drive: 10 plays, 49 yards, 3:48, Ohio 14–0)
- (07:20) OHIO - Brack Peacock 22-yard field goal (Drive: 11 plays, 70 yards, 5:00, Ohio 17–0)
- (01:02) M-OH – Maleek Huggins 15-yard pass from Scoop Smith (Brady Stidham kick) (Drive: 6 plays, 55 yards, 2:29, Ohio 17–7)

Third quarter

- (06:58) M-OH – D'Shawntae Jones 1-yard run (Brady Stidham kick) (Drive: 8 plays, 69 yards, 3:49, Ohio 17–14)

Fourth quarter

- (14:16) M-OH - Brady Stidham 36-yard field goal (Drive: 7 plays, 42 yards, 2:51, Tied 17–17)
- (03:55) M-OH - Brady Stidham 25-yard field goal (Drive: 9 plays, 57 yards, 3:47, Miami 20–17)
- (01:45) M-OH – D'Shawntae Jones 48-yard run (Brady Stidham kick) (Drive: 1 plays, 48 yards, 0:10, Miami 27–17)
- (01:25) M-OH – Amariyunr Knighten 58-yard interception return (Brady Stidham kick) (Miami 34–17)

| Statistics | OHIO | M-OH |
|---|---|---|
| First downs | 21 | 15 |
| Total yards | 80–381 | 58–361 |
| Rushing yards | 37–152 | 33–208 |
| Passing yards | 229 | 153 |
| Passing: Comp–Att–Int | 23–43–1 | 10–25–0 |
| Time of possession | 35:31 | 24:29 |

| Team | Category | Player | Statistics |
|---|---|---|---|
| Ohio | Passing | Nick Poulos | 20/39, 193 yards, TD, INT |
| Ohio | Rushing | Nick Poulos | 17 carries, 68 yards |
| Ohio | Receiving | Riley Neer | 6 receptions, 74 yards, TD |
| Miami (OH) | Passing | Drew Bellisari | 8/15, 99 yards |
| Miami (OH) | Rushing | D'Shawntae Jones | 18 carries, 115 yards, 2 TD |
| Miami (OH) | Receiving | Maleek Huggins | 3 receptions, 61 yards, TD |

=== at Kent State ===
Miami RedHawks (6–4) at Kent State Golden Flashes (3–7) – Game summary

| Quarter | 1 | 2 | 3 | 4 | Total |
|---|---|---|---|---|---|
| RedHawks | 0 | 0 | 0 | 0 | 0 |
| Golden Flashes | 0 | 0 | 0 | 0 | 0 |

at Dix Stadium •Kent, Ohio

- Date: November 17

Game information

First quarter
Second quarter
Third quarter
Fourth quarter

| Statistics | M-OH | KENT |
|---|---|---|
| First downs | | |
| Plays–yards | | |
| Rushes–yards | | |
| Passing yards | | |
| Passing: comp–att–int | | |
| Turnovers | | |
| Time of possession | | |

| Team | Category | Player | Statistics |
|---|---|---|---|
| Miami (OH) | Passing | | |
| Miami (OH) | Rushing | | |
| Miami (OH) | Receiving | | |
| Kent State | Passing | | |
| Kent State | Rushing | | |
| Kent State | Receiving | | |

=== at Western Michigan ===
Miami RedHawks (7–4) at Western Michigan Broncos (8–3) – Game summary

| Quarter | 1 | 2 | 3 | 4 | Total |
|---|---|---|---|---|---|
| RedHawks | 0 | 0 | 0 | 0 | 0 |
| Broncos | 0 | 0 | 0 | 0 | 0 |

at Waldo Stadium • Kalamazoo, Michigan

- Date: November 24

Game information

First quarter
Second quarter
Third quarter
Fourth quarter

| Statistics | M-OH | WMU |
|---|---|---|
| First downs | | |
| Plays–yards | | |
| Rushes–yards | | |
| Passing yards | | |
| Passing: comp–att–int | | |
| Turnovers | | |
| Time of possession | | |

| Team | Category | Player | Statistics |
|---|---|---|---|
| Miami (OH) | Passing | | |
| Miami (OH) | Rushing | | |
| Miami (OH) | Receiving | | |
| Western Michigan | Passing | | |
| Western Michigan | Rushing | | |
| Western Michigan | Receiving | | |
