= Mazzulla =

Mazzulla is an Italian surname. Notable people with the surname include:

- Dan Mazzulla (1958–2020), American basketball player and coach
- Joe Mazzulla (born 1988), American basketball coach
