= 2026 Cincinnati Bearcats football team =

American college football season

2026 Cincinnati Bearcats football
- Conference: Big 12 Conference
- Record: 6–5 (3–5 Big 12)
- Head coach: Scott Satterfield (4th season)
- Associate head coach: Mark Speir (1st season)
- Offensive coordinator: Pete Thomas (1st season)
- Co-offensive coordinator: Nic Cardwell (1st season)
- Offensive scheme: Spread option
- Defensive coordinator: Nate Woody (1st season)
- Co-defensive coordinator: Cortney Braswell (2nd season)
- Base defense: 3–4
- Home stadium: Nippert Stadium

Uniform
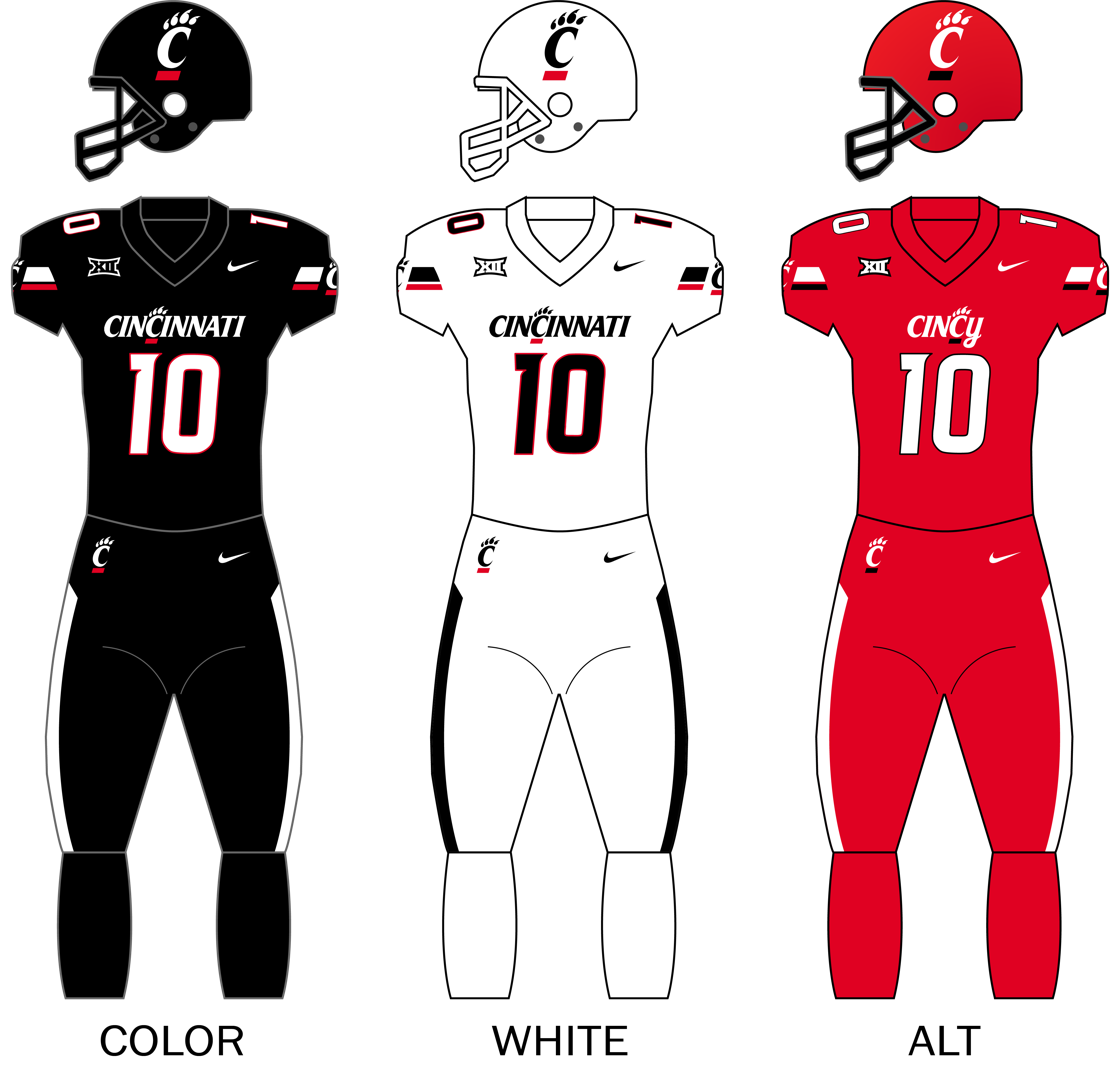

2026 Big 12 Conference football standings
	Conf.			Overall
Team	W		L	W		L
No. 2 Utah	8	–	0	11	–	0
No. 12 Texas Tech	7	–	1	10	–	1
No. 10 BYU	6	–	2	9	–	2
No. 19 Arizona	5	–	3	8	–	3
No. 20 Houston	5	–	3	8	–	3
Arizona State	4	–	3	6	–	4
Oklahoma State	4	–	3	6	–	4
Baylor	4	–	4	6	–	5
UCF	4	–	4	6	–	5
Iowa State	3	–	5	5	–	6
TCU	3	–	5	5	–	6
Cincinnati	3	–	5	6	–	5
Kansas	2	–	6	4	–	7
West Virginia	2	–	6	5	–	6
Colorado	2	–	6	4	–	7
Kansas State	1	–	7	4	–	7
Championship: December 4, 2026
^ – College Football Playoff participant; $ – Conference champion; y – Championship game participant; As of November 22, 2026; Rankings from CFP rankings

The 2026 Cincinnati Bearcats football team represents the University of Cincinnati during the 2026 NCAA Division I FBS football season. The Bearcats, members of the Big 12 Conference, play home games at Nippert Stadium in Cincinnati, Ohio. 2026 is the program's fourth season under head coach Scott Satterfield.

This was the first season since 2015 (when they joined the American Athletic Conference) that they did not play against rival UCF.

== Offseason ==
=== Coaching staff changes ===
==== Departures ====
Departures
Name	Position	Reason for leaving	New school	New position
Tyson Veidt	Defensive coordinator	Took position at other school	Penn State	Linebackers
Eddie Hicks	Cornerbacks	Took position at other school	Arkansas	Cornerbacks
Brad Glenn	Offensive coordinator	Not retained	Clemson	Offensive Player Development/Assistant Tight Ends Coach

==== Additions ====
Additions
Name	Position	Previous school	Previous position
Nate Woody	Defensive coordinator	Army	Defensive coordinator
Mark Speir	Assistant Head Coach	Appalachian State	Offensive Assistant

=== Transfer portal ===
Departing transfers
Name	Pos.	Height	Weight	Year	Hometown	New school
Manny Covey	RB	5' 11"	192		Starke, FL	Memphis
Kelian Smith	DL	6' 2"	330		Pickerington, OH	Ball State
Noah Jennings	WR	6' 0"	190		Blythewood, SC	Minnesota
Barry Jackson Jr.	WR	5' 11"	195		Ellenwood, GA	Rice
Darrel Gipson	EDGE	6' 1"	242		Lacey, WA	Idaho
Caleb Goodie	WR	6' 1"	178		Port Arthur, TX	Missouri
Tim Griffin	DL	6' 5"	275		Covington, GA	Georgia Tech
Tayden Barnes	S	5' 8"	185		Amarillo, TX	New Mexico State
Weston Simmons	LS	5' 11"	215		Mason, OH	Memphis
Jakorion Caffrey	RB	5' 10"	212		Avon, OH	Kent State
Lendric Barber	DL	6' 3"	310		McDonough, GA	Eastern Kentucky
Cincear Lewis	LB	6' 1"	218		Kalamazoo, MI	Ball State
Evan Pryor	RB	5' 9"	195		Cornelius, NC	Florida
Mikah Coleman	EDGE	6' 4"	272		Reynoldsburg, OH	Miami(OH)
Ormanie Arnold	CB	5' 9"	178		Compton, CA	New Mexico
Quan Sanks	S	5' 10"	195		Phenix City, AL	Indiana
Brendan Sorsby	QB	6' 3"	235		Lake Dallas, TX	Texas Tech
Chance Williams	RB	5' 8"	190		Baton Rouge, LA	Charlotte
Christian Harrison	S	6' 0"	195		Atlanta, GA	Arkansas
Kye Stokes	S	6' 1"	194		Seffner, FL	Utah State
Kamari Burns	DL	6' 3"	300		Columbus, OH	Kansas State
Ethan Green	OT	6' 6"	313		Fremont, OH	South Florida
Dakarai Anderson	WR	5' 8"	183		Perry, GA	Central Arkansas

=== Recruiting ===
College recruiting (2026)
Name	Hometown	School	Height	Weight	Commit date
Lance Dawson; DL	Avon, Ohio	Avon High School	6 ft 5 in (1.96 m)	250 lb (110 kg)	Jun 16, 2025
Lance Dawson; DL	Recruit ratings: Rivals: 247Sports: ESPN:				
Markell Taylor; S	Dallas, Georgia	North Paulding High School	5 ft 11.5 in (1.82 m)	190 lb (86 kg)	Jun 24, 2025
Markell Taylor; S	Recruit ratings: Rivals: 247Sports: ESPN:				
Jonathan Rulo; DL	Belleville, Illinois	Belleville East High School	6 ft 1 in (1.85 m)	300 lb (140 kg)	Jun 23, 2025
Jonathan Rulo; DL	Recruit ratings: Rivals: 247Sports: ESPN:				
Jeremiah Gray; DL	Detroit, Michigan	Detroit Central High School	6 ft 7 in (2.01 m)	250 lb (110 kg)	Apr 16, 2025
Jeremiah Gray; DL	Recruit ratings: Rivals: 247Sports: ESPN:				
Jaidon Windom; S	Detroit, Michigan	Martin Luther King Jr. Senior High School	6 ft 1 in (1.85 m)	175 lb (79 kg)	Feb 4, 2025
Jaidon Windom; S	Recruit ratings: Rivals: 247Sports: ESPN:				
Jalen Williams; TE	Bloomington, Indiana	Bloomington High School South	6 ft 5 in (1.96 m)	215 lb (98 kg)	Nov 24, 2025
Jalen Williams; TE	Recruit ratings: Rivals: 247Sports: ESPN:				
Austin Hoane; IOL	Cookeville, Tennessee	Cookeville High School	6 ft 4 in (1.93 m)	285 lb (129 kg)	Jun 9, 2025
Austin Hoane; IOL	Recruit ratings: Rivals: 247Sports: ESPN:				
Xavier Starks; S	Pinson, Alabama	Clay-Chalkville High School	6 ft 0 in (1.83 m)	176 lb (80 kg)	Feb 14, 2025
Xavier Starks; S	Recruit ratings: Rivals: 247Sports: ESPN:				
Adam Kirtley; LB	Cincinnati, Ohio	Taft High School	6 ft 0 in (1.83 m)	205 lb (93 kg)	Jun 23, 2025
Adam Kirtley; LB	Recruit ratings: Rivals: 247Sports: ESPN:				
Solomon Mathis; OT	Hephzibah, Georgia	Hephzibah High School	6 ft 5 in (1.96 m)	285 lb (129 kg)	Feb 9, 2025
Solomon Mathis; OT	Recruit ratings: Rivals: 247Sports: ESPN:				
Heij Jackson; WR	New Orleans, Louisiana	McDonogh 35 Senior High School	6 ft 3 in (1.91 m)	185 lb (84 kg)	Nov 20, 2025
Heij Jackson; WR	Recruit ratings: Rivals: 247Sports: ESPN:				
Joshua Smith; ATH	Columbus, Ohio	Columbus Africentric Early College	6 ft 4 in (1.93 m)	180 lb (82 kg)	Oct 29, 2025
Joshua Smith; ATH	Recruit ratings: Rivals: 247Sports: ESPN:				
Dadrien Waller; WR	Guntersville, Alabama	Guntersville High School	6 ft 5 in (1.96 m)	200 lb (91 kg)	Mar 3, 2025
Dadrien Waller; WR	Recruit ratings: Rivals: 247Sports: ESPN:				
Nathan Zappitelli; IOL	Painesville, Ohio	Lake Catholic High School	6 ft 4 in (1.93 m)	265 lb (120 kg)	Jun 17, 2025
Nathan Zappitelli; IOL	Recruit ratings: Rivals: 247Sports: ESPN:				
Brooks Goodman; QB	Roswell, Georgia	Blessed Trinity Catholic High School	6 ft 2 in (1.88 m)	200 lb (91 kg)	Apr 30, 2025
Brooks Goodman; QB	Recruit ratings: Rivals: 247Sports: ESPN:				
Kameron Hurst; CB	St. Louis, Missouri	Lift For Life Academy	6 ft 0 in (1.83 m)	170 lb (77 kg)	Nov 19, 2025
Kameron Hurst; CB	Recruit ratings: Rivals: 247Sports: ESPN:				
Luke Collins; IOL	Columbus, Ohio	Gahanna Lincoln High School	6 ft 4 in (1.93 m)	280 lb (130 kg)	Mar 5, 2025
Luke Collins; IOL	Recruit ratings: Rivals: 247Sports: ESPN:				
Luke Grover; OT	Lewis Center, Ohio	Olentangy Orange High School	6 ft 5 in (1.96 m)	270 lb (120 kg)	Jun 17, 2025
Luke Grover; OT	Recruit ratings: Rivals: 247Sports: ESPN:				
Jamarion McKinney; CB	Greenville, South Carolina	Greenville High School	6 ft 1 in (1.85 m)	170 lb (77 kg)	Sep 20, 2025
Jamarion McKinney; CB	Recruit ratings: Rivals: 247Sports: ESPN:				
Darrius Simmons; DL	Cairo, Georgia	Cairo High School	6 ft 4 in (1.93 m)	306 lb (139 kg)	Jun 22, 2025
Darrius Simmons; DL	Recruit ratings: Rivals: 247Sports: ESPN:				
Keegan Horn; EDGE	Hueytown, Alabama	Hueytown High School	6 ft 3 in (1.91 m)	225 lb (102 kg)	Aug 3, 2025
Keegan Horn; EDGE	Recruit ratings: Rivals: 247Sports:				
Evan Weinberg; EDGE	Springboro, Ohio	Springboro High School	6 ft 2 in (1.88 m)	230 lb (100 kg)	Oct 14, 2025
Evan Weinberg; EDGE	Recruit ratings: Rivals: 247Sports:				
Jaxon Newton; LB	Anniston, Alabama	Wellborn High School	6 ft 4 in (1.93 m)	195 lb (88 kg)	Oct 25, 2025
Jaxon Newton; LB	Recruit ratings: Rivals:				
Kenny Baker; LS	Cincinnati, Ohio	Elder High School	6 ft 1 in (1.85 m)	190 lb (86 kg)	Jan 16, 2026
Kenny Baker; LS	Recruit ratings: No ratings found				
Overall recruit ranking:
Note: In many cases, Scout, Rivals, 247Sports, On3, and ESPN may conflict in their listings of height and weight.; In these cases, the average was taken. ESPN grades are on a 100-point scale.; Sources: "2026 Cincinnati Football Commitment List". Rivals.; "2026 Players Commitments – Cincinnati". ESPN.; "2026 Team Ranking". Rivals.com.; "2026 Cincinnati Bearcats football team". 247Sports.

=== 2026 NFL draft ===
Round	Pick	NFL team	Player	Position
2	51	Minnesota Vikings	Jake Golday	LB
5	170	Cleveland Browns	Joe Royer	TE
5	176	Kansas City Chiefs	Cyrus Allen	WR
7	235	Minnesota Vikings	Gavin Gerhardt	C
UDFA		Baltimore Ravens	Matthew McDoom	DB
UDFA		Cincinnati Bengals	Jack Dingle	LB
UDFA		Jacksonville Jaguars	Jalen Hunt	DL
UDFA		Kansas City Chiefs	Jeff Caldwell	WR

== Schedule ==
Date	Time	Opponent	Site	TV	Result	Attendance
September 5	3:30 p.m.	Boston College*	Nippert Stadium; Cincinnati, OH	FOX	W 34–15	37,097
September 12	7:00 p.m.	Western Carolina*	Nippert Stadium; Cincinnati, OH	ESPN+	W 62–10	34,827
September 19	3:30 p.m.	vs. Miami (OH)*	TQL Stadium; Cincinnati, OH (Victory Bell)	ESPN+	W 35–31	19,188
September 26	7:00 p.m.	Kansas State	Nippert Stadium; Cincinnati, OH	ESPN2	W 31–26	37,562
October 3	11:00 p.m.	at Arizona	Casino Del Sol Stadium; Tucson, AZ	FOX	L 7–34	43,760
October 17	12:00 p.m.	at West Virginia	Milan Puskar Stadium; Morgantown, WV (rivalry)	TNT/TruTV	L 42–45	48,106
October 24	12:00 p.m.	No. 8 Texas Tech^{†}	Nippert Stadium; Cincinnati, OH	FS1	W 37–24	38,088
October 31	3:45 p.m.	No. 6 Utah	Nippert Stadium; Cincinnati, OH	ESPN	L 25–49	36,487
November 7	3:30 p.m.	at No. 17 Houston	TDECU Stadium; Houston, TX	FOX	L 24–31	32,372
November 14	12:00 p.m.	at Iowa State	Jack Trice Stadium; Ames, IA	TNT/TruTV	L 13–41	50,162
November 21	12:00 p.m.	Colorado	Nippert Stadium; Cincinnati, OH	ESPN+	W 35–28	36,792
November 28	3:30 p.m.	at BYU	LaVell Edwards Stadium; Provo, UT	FOX		
*Non-conference game; ^{†}Homecoming; Rankings from AP Poll (and CFP Rankings, after November 3) – Released prior to game; All times are in Eastern time; Source:

== Game summaries ==
=== vs. Boston College ===
Boston College Eagles (0–0) at Cincinnati Bearcats (0–0) – Game summary

Quarter	1	2	3	4	Total
Eagles	0	0	8	7	15
Bearcats	3	7	14	10	34

at Nippert Stadium • Cincinnati, Ohio

- Date: September 5
- Game time: 3:30 p.m.
- Game weather: Sunny • Temperature: 90 °F (32 °C) • Wind: W at 6 miles per hour (9.7 km/h)
- Game attendance: 37,097
- Referee: Tim Hedgepeth
- TV announcers (FOX): Tim Brando (play-by-play), Devin Gardner (analyst), and Josh Sims (sideline)

Game information

First quarter

- CIN – Stephen Rusnak 54-yard field goal, 8:27. Bearcats 3–0. Drive: 8 plays, 41 yards, 3:46.

Second quarter

- CIN – JV Gibson 4-yard pass from JC French IV (Stephen Rusnak kick), 7:48. Bearcats 10–0. Drive: 13 plays, 80 yards, 6:29.

Third quarter

- CIN – JC French IV 4-yard run (Stephen Rusnak kick), 10:48. Bearcats 17–0. Drive: 10 plays, 75 yards, 4:12.
- CIN – JC French IV 4-yard run (Stephen Rusnak kick), 5:24. Bearcats 24–0. Drive: 7 plays, 55 yards, 3:10.
- BC – Evan Dickens 4-yard run (Mason McKenzie run), 2:01. Bearcats 24–8. Drive: 7 plays, 75 yards, 3:23.

Fourth quarter

- CIN – Stephen Rusnak 44-yard field goal, 5:00. Bearcats 27–8. Drive: 4 plays, 3 yards, 0:59.
- CIN – JC French IV 1-yard run (Stephen Rusnak kick), 1:58. Bearcats 34–8. Drive: 4 plays, 38 yards, 1:53.
- BC – Johnathan Montague Jr. 23-yard pass from Mason McKenzie (Luca Lombardo kick), 1:02. Bearcats 34–15. Drive: 3 plays, 82 yards, 0:51.

Statistics	BC	CIN
First downs	24	17
Plays–yards	73–388	61–339
Rushes–yards	38–165	46–254
Passing yards	223	85
Passing: comp–att–int	18–35–1	11–15–0
Turnovers	2	0
Time of possession	31:19	28:41

Team	Category	Player	Statistics
Boston College	Passing	Mason McKenzie	18/35, 223 yards, TD, INT
Boston College	Rushing	Mason McKenzie	20 carries, 78 yards
Boston College	Receiving	Javarius Green	6 receptions, 74 yards
Cincinnati	Passing	JC French IV	10/14, 77 yards, TD
Cincinnati	Rushing	Gi'Bran Payne	14 carries, 108 yards
Cincinnati	Receiving	JV Gibson	4 receptions, 54 yards, TD

=== vs. Western Carolina (FCS) ===
Western Carolina Catamounts (FCS) (1–1) at Cincinnati Bearcats (1–0) – Game summary

Quarter	1	2	3	4	Total
Catamounts (FCS)	3	7	0	0	10
Bearcats	7	21	21	13	62

at Nippert Stadium • Cincinnati, Ohio

- Date: September 12
- Game time: 7:00 p.m.
- Game weather: Cloudy • Temperature: 77 °F (25 °C) • Wind: SW at 3 miles per hour (4.8 km/h)
- Game attendance: 34,827
- Referee: Lyndon Nixon
- TV announcers (ESPN+): Kevin Fitzgerald (play-by-play) and Todd Doxzon (analyst)

Game information

First quarter

- WCU – Bryan McCollum 33-yard field goal, 8:57. Catamounts 3–0. Drive: 12 plays, 60 yards, 6:03.
- CIN – JV Gibson 5-yard pass from JC French IV (Stephen Rusnak kick), 3:34. Bearcats 7–3. Drive: 13 plays, 75 yards, 5:23.

Second quarter

- CIN – Lyviel Waters 2-yard pass from JC French IV (Stephen Rusnak kick), 12:35. Bearcats 14–3. Drive: 12 plays, 75 yards, 4:30.
- WCU – Lex Thomas 1-yard run (Bryan McCollum kick), 6:23. Bearcats 14–10. Drive: 11 plays, 75 yards, 6:12.
- CIN – Cole Tabb 36-yard run (Stephen Rusnak kick), 3:00. Bearcats 21–10. Drive: 7 plays, 81 yards, 3:18.
- CIN – Zion Johnson 3-yard run (Stephen Rusnak kick), 0:38. Bearcats 28–10. Drive: 6 plays, 85 yards, 1:06.

Third quarter

- CIN – Gi'Bran Payne 40-yard run (Stephen Rusnak kick), 9:10. Bearcats 35–10. Drive: 2 plays, 49 yards, 0:32.
- CIN – Gi'Bran Payne 17-yard run (Stephen Rusnak kick), 5:03. Bearcats 42–10. Drive: 3 plays, 73 yards, 0:47.
- CIN – Zylan Perry 40-yard run (Stephen Rusnak kick), 2:02. Bearcats 49–10. Drive: 3 plays, 61 yards, 1:30.

Fourth quarter

- CIN – Liam O'Brien 11-yard run (Max Lemasters kick failed), 11:51. Bearcats 55–10. Drive: 8 plays, 59 yards, 3:10.
- CIN – Samaj Jones 4-yard run (Stephen Rusnak kick), 0:43. Bearcats 62–10. Drive: 12 plays, 57 yards, 5:12.

Statistics	WCU	CIN
First downs	13	32
Plays–yards	57–241	80–690
Rushes–yards	20–74	49–418
Passing yards	167	272
Passing: comp–att–int	24–37–1	28–31–0
Turnovers	1	0
Time of possession	27:23	32:37

Team	Category	Player	Statistics
Western Carolina	Passing	Lex Thomas	23/32, 165 yards
Western Carolina	Rushing	Marlin Cochran	3 carries, 25 yards
Western Carolina	Receiving	Jake Young	5 receptions, 49 yards
Cincinnati	Passing	JC French IV	21/24, 245 yards, 2 TD
Cincinnati	Rushing	Gi'Bran Payne	12 carries, 102 yards, 2 TD
Cincinnati	Receiving	Malachi Henry	3 receptions, 87 yards

=== vs. Miami (OH) (Victory Bell) ===
Miami RedHawks (1–1) vs. Cincinnati Bearcats (2–0) – Game summary

Quarter	1	2	3	4	Total
RedHawks	14	14	0	3	31
Bearcats	7	0	14	14	35

at TQL Stadium • Cincinnati, Ohio

- Date: September 19
- Game time: 3:30 p.m.
- Game weather: Sunny • Temperature: 87 °F (31 °C) • Wind: S at 7 miles per hour (11 km/h)
- Game attendance: 21,045
- Referee: Chris La Grange
- TV announcers (ESPN+): Pete Sousa (play-by-play), Leger Douzable (analyst), and Sydney Jones (sideline)

Game information

First quarter

- M-OH – Scoop Smith 98-yard kickoff return (Kellan McLaughlin kick), 14:46. RedHawks 7–0.
- M-OH – Lazaro Smith 12-yard run (Kellan McLaughlin kick), 10:53. RedHawks 14–0. Drive: 4 plays, 67 yards, 2:02.
- CIN – Cole Tabb 1-yard run (Stephen Rusnak kick), 6:07. RedHawks 14–7. Drive: 10 plays, 75 yards, 4:46.

Second quarter

- M-OH – David McComb 6-yard run (Kellan McLaughlin kick), 5:52. RedHawks 21–7. Drive: 10 plays, 91 yards, 6:20.
- M-OH – Maleek Huggins 36-yard pass from David McComb (Kellan McLaughlin kick), 0:21. RedHawks 28–7. Drive: 6 plays, 65 yards, 1:34.

Third quarter

- CIN – JC French IV 1-yard run (Stephen Rusnak kick), 7:27. RedHawks 28–14. Drive: 8 plays, 80 yards, 3:27.
- CIN – Cole Tabb 8-yard pass from JC French IV (Stephen Rusnak kick), 2:44. RedHawks 28–21. Drive: 7 plays, 31 yards, 3:12.

Fourth quarter

- M-OH – Kellan McLaughlin 19-yard field goal, 13:51. RedHawks 31–21. Drive: 8 plays, 74 yards, 3:53.
- CIN – JV Gibson 6-yard pass from JC French IV (Stephen Rusnak kick), 6:20. RedHawks 31–28. Drive: 9 plays, 73 yards, 4:30.
- CIN – Cole Tabb 53-yard run (Stephen Rusnak kick), 1:29. Bearcats 35–31. Drive: 7 plays, 85 yards, 2:17.

Statistics	M-OH	CIN
First downs	20	25
Total yards	410	446
Rushes–yards	28–76	33–137
Passing yards	334	309
Passing: comp–att–int	17–28–1	31–43–0
Turnovers	2	1
Time of possession	26:34	33:26

Team	Category	Player	Statistics
Miami (OH)	Passing	David McComb	17–28, 334 yards, TD, INT
Miami (OH)	Rushing	Rodney Nelson	7 carries, 32 yards
Miami (OH)	Receiving	Maleek Huggins	4 receptions, 128 yards, TD
Cincinnati	Passing	JC French IV	31–43, 309 yards, 2 TD
Cincinnati	Rushing	Cole Tabb	6 carries, 78 yards, 2 TD
Cincinnati	Receiving	JV Gibson	7 receptions, 68 yards, TD

=== vs. Kansas State ===
Kansas State Wildcats (3–0) at Cincinnati Bearcats (3–0) – Game summary

Quarter	1	2	3	4	Total
Wildcats	3	14	0	9	26
Bearcats	0	10	14	7	31

at Nippert Stadium • Cincinnati, Ohio

- Date: September 26
- Game time: 7:00 p.m.
- Game weather: Sunny • Temperature: 73 °F (23 °C) • Wind: N at 8 miles per hour (13 km/h)
- Game attendance: 37,562
- Referee: Kevin Boitmann
- TV announcers (ESPN2): Chuckie Kempf (play-by-play) and Dustin Fox (analyst)

Game information

First quarter

- KSU – Luis Rodriguez 22-yard field goal, 4:32. Wildcats 3-0. Drive: 16 plays, 88 yards, 7:59.

Second quarter

- KSU – Rodney Fields Jr. 19-yard run (Luis Rodriguez kick), 9:09. Wildcats 10–0. Drive: 5 plays, 69 yards, 2:19.
- CIN – Malachi Henry 39-yard pass from JC French IV (Stephen Rusnak kick), 6:36. Wildcats 10-7. Drive: 5 plays, 88 yards, 2:30.
- CIN – Stephen Rusnak 44-yard field goal, 3:44. Tied 10-10. Drive: 5 plays, 54 yards, 2:02.
- KSU – Derrick Salley Jr. 4-yard pass from Avery Johnson (Luis Rodriguez kick), 0:15. Wildcats 17-10. Drive: 10 plays, 65 yards, 3:29.

Third quarter

- CIN – Cole Tabb 5-yard run (Stephen Rusnak kick), 10:55. Tied 17-17. Drive: 7 plays, 55 yards, 3:49.
- CIN – Cole Tabb 30-yard run (Stephen Rusnak kick), 7:26. Bearcats 24-17. Drive: 3 plays, 36 yards, 1:07.

Fourth quarter

- KSU – Luis Rodriguez 36-yard field goal, 9:30. Bearcats 24-20. Drive: 17 plays, 65 yards, 7:49.
- CIN – Cole Tabb 14-yard run (Stephen Rusnak kick), 3:28. Bearcats 31-20. Drive: 10 plays, 75 yards, 6:02.
- KSU – Rodney Fields Jr. 2-yard run (Derrick Salley Jr. pass from Avery Johnson failed), 1:15. Bearcats 31-26. Drive: 9 plays, 79 yards, 2:11.

Statistics	KSU	CIN
First downs	25	16
Plays–yards	80–447	51–436
Rushes–yards	30–155	38–271
Passing yards	292	165
Passing: comp–att–int	30–50–0	8–13–0
Time of possession	33:18	26:42

Team	Category	Player	Statistics
Kansas State	Passing	Avery Johnson	30–50, 292 yards, TD
Kansas State	Rushing	Joe Jackson	11 carries, 59 yards
Kansas State	Receiving	Derrick Salley Jr.	7 receptions, 140 yards, TD
Cincinnati	Passing	JC French IV	8–13, 165 yards, TD
Cincinnati	Rushing	Gi'Bran Payne	16 carries, 126 yards
Cincinnati	Receiving	JV Gibson	2 receptions, 66 yards

=== at Arizona ===
Cincinnati Bearcats (4–0) at Arizona Wildcats (3–1) – Game summary

Quarter	1	2	3	4	Total
Bearcats	0	0	0	7	7
Wildcats	7	3	14	10	34

at Casino Del Sol Stadium • Tucson, Arizona

- Date: October 3
- Game time: 11:00 p.m.
- Game weather: Sunny, 80 °F (27 °C)
- Game attendance: 43,760
- Referee: Henry Johns
- TV announcers (FOX): Jack Kizer (play-by-play) and Mark Helfrich (analyst)

Game information

First quarter

- (10:21) ARIZ – Kedrick Reescano 10-yard run, Michael Salgado-Medina kick (Drive: 10 plays, 75 yards, 4:38; Arizona 7–0)

Second quarter

- (0:01) ARIZ – Michael Salgado-Medina 23-yard field goal (Drive: 16 plays, 92 yards, 5:48; Arizona 10–0)

Third quarter

- (9:29) ARIZ – Noah Fifita 8-yard run, Michael Salgado-Medina kick (Drive: 7 plays, 80 yards, 3:38; Arizona 17–0)
- (3:07) ARIZ – Brandon Phelps 24-yard pass from Noah Fifita, Michael Salgado-Medina kick (Drive: 6 plays, 68 yards, 2:26; Arizona 24–0)

Fourth quarter

- (12:11) ARIZ – Michael Salgado-Medina 35-yard field goal (Drive: 10 plays, 52 yards, 4:41; Arizona 27–0)
- (5:21) ARIZ – Tyler Powell 5-yard pass from Noah Fifita, Michael Salgado-Medina kick (Drive: 13 plays, 71 yards, 6:06; Arizona 34–0)
- (1:56) CIN – JC French IV 2-yard run, Stephen Rusnak kick (Drive: 9 plays, 75 yards, 3:25; Arizona 34–7)

Statistics	CIN	ARIZ
First downs	12	30
Plays–yards	57–227	78–522
Rushes–yards	28–74	41–238
Passing yards	153	284
Passing: comp–att–int	16–29–0	25–37–1
Time of possession	24:21	35:39

Team	Category	Player	Statistics
Cincinnati	Passing	JC French IV	16/29, 153 yards
Cincinnati	Rushing	JC French IV	9 carries, 29 yards, TD
Cincinnati	Receiving	Isaiah Johnson	6 receptions, 60 yards
Arizona	Passing	Noah Fifita	25/37, 284 yards, 2 TD, INT
Arizona	Rushing	Antwan Roberts Jr.	5 carries, 87 yards
Arizona	Receiving	Isaiah Mizell	4 receptions, 67 yards

=== at West Virginia ===
Cincinnati Bearcats (4–1) at West Virginia Mountaineers (3–3) – Game summary

Quarter	1	2	3	4	Total
Bearcats	7	14	7	14	42
Mountaineers	0	14	7	24	45

at Milan Puskar Stadium • Morgantown, West Virginia

- Date: October 17
- Game time: 12:00 p.m.
- Game weather: Cloudy • Temperature: 48 °F (9 °C) • Wind: S 12 mph
- Game attendance: 48,106
- Referee: Michael McCabe
- TV announcers (TNT/TruTV): J. B. Long (play-by-play), Mike Golic Jr. (analyst), and Jared Greenberg (sideline)

Game information

First quarter

- (8:53) CIN – JV Gibson 4-yard pass from JC French IV, Stephen Rusnak kick (Drive: 13 plays, 75 yards, 6:07; Cincinnati 7–0)

Second quarter

- (11:56) WVU – Michael Hawkins Jr. 12-yard run, Jack Cassidy kick (Drive: 10 plays, 81 yards, 3:56; Tied 7–7)
- (4:55) CIN – Isaiah Johnson 51-yard pass from JC French IV, Stephen Rusnak kick (Drive: 5 plays, 77 yards, 2:00; Cincinnati 14–7)
- (2:19) WVU – Michael Hawkins Jr. 2-yard run, Jack Cassidy kick (Drive: 7 plays, 78 yards, 2:31; Tied 14–14)
- (1:22) CIN – Cole Tabb 28-yard run, Stephen Rusnak kick (Drive: 4 plays, 75 yards, 0:57; Cincinnati 21–14)

Third quarter

- (12:32) WVU – Josh Sapp 4-yard pass from Michael Hawkins Jr., Jack Cassidy kick (Drive: 7 plays, 75 yards, 2:28; Tied 21–21)
- (1:34) CIN – JC French IV 1-yard run, Stephen Rusnak kick (Drive: 13 plays, 78 yards, 6:44; Cincinnati 28–21)

Fourth quarter

- (14:51) WVU – DJ Epps 37-yard pass from Michael Hawkins Jr., Jack Cassidy kick (Drive: 6 plays, 75 yards, 1:43; Tied 28–28)
- (11:23) CIN – Cole Tabb 11-yard pass from JC French IV, Stephen Rusnak kick (Drive: 8 plays, 65 yards, 3:28; Cincinnati 35–28)
- (7:29) WVU – Amari Latimer 3-yard run, Jack Cassidy kick (Drive: 9 plays, 75 yards, 3:54; Tied 35–35)
- (5:35) CIN – Cole Tabb 6-yard run, Stephen Rusnak kick (Drive: 5 plays, 75 yards, 1:54; Cincinnati 42–35)
- (3:44) WVU – Cam Cook 40-yard pass from Michael Hawkins Jr., Jack Cassidy kick (Drive: 5 plays, 75 yards, 1:51; Tied 42–42)
- (0:00) WVU – Jack Cassidy 35-yard field goal (Drive: 8 plays, 82 yards, 2:05; West Virginia 45–42)

Statistics	CIN	WVU
First downs	28	27
Plays–yards	70–622	79–598
Rushes–yards	40–233	46–134
Passing yards	389	464
Passing: comp–att–int	22–30–0	25–33–0
Time of possession	31:56	28:04

Team	Category	Player	Statistics
Cincinnati	Passing	JC French IV	22/30, 389 yards, 3 TD
Cincinnati	Rushing	Cole Tabb	15 carries, 118 yards, 2 TD
Cincinnati	Receiving	Malachi Henry	2 receptions, 128 yards
West Virginia	Passing	Michael Hawkins Jr.	25/33, 464 yards, 3 TD
West Virginia	Rushing	Michael Hawkins Jr.	26 carries, 104 yards, 2 TD
West Virginia	Receiving	DJ Epps	8 receptions, 163 yards, TD

=== vs. No. 8 Texas Tech ===
No. 8 Texas Tech Red Raiders (6–0) at Cincinnati Bearcats (4–2) – Game summary

Quarter	1	2	3	4	Total
No. 8 Red Raiders	6	0	9	9	24
Bearcats	3	21	7	6	37

at Nippert Stadium • Cincinnati, Ohio

- Date: October 24
- Game time: 12:00 p.m.
- Game weather: Sunny • Temperature: 58 °F (14 °C) • Wind: E 2 mph
- Game attendance: 38,088
- Referee: Michael VanderVelde
- TV announcers (FS1): Jack Kizer (play-by-play) and Mark Helfrich (analyst)

Game information

First quarter

- CIN – Stephen Rusnak 47-yard field goal, 11:22. Bearcats 3–0. Drive: 5 plays, 18 yards, 1:19.
- TTU – Stone Harrington 32-yard field goal, 6:11. Tied 3–3. Drive: 12 plays, 44 yards, 5:01.
- TTU – Stone Harrington 48-yard field goal, 0:58. Red Raiders 6–3. Drive: 10 plays, 60 yards, 4:03.

Second quarter

- CIN – Cole Tabb 4-yard pass from JC French (Stephen Rusnak kick), 7:48. Bearcats 10–6. Drive: 10 plays, 85 yards, 5:00.
- CIN – Malachi Henry 5-yard pass from JC French (Stephen Rusnak kick), 1:37. Bearcats 17–6. Drive: 11 plays, 55 yards, 4:11.
- CIN – Lyviel Waters 2-yard pass from JC French (Stephen Rusnak kick), 0:05. Bearcats 24–6. Drive: 5 plays, 75 yards, 0:26.

Third quarter

- TTU – Stone Harrington 42-yard field goal, 11:07. Bearcats 24–9. Drive: 11 plays, 54 yards, 3:49.
- TTU – Peyton Morgan 53-yard interception return (pass failed), 8:49. Bearcats 24–15.
- CIN – Larenzo Fenner 17-yard pass from JC French (Stephen Rusnak kick), 0:50. Bearcats 31–15. Drive: 10 plays, 81 yards, 4:17.

Fourth quarter

- TTU – Stone Harrington 33-yard field goal, 7:42. Bearcats 31–18. Drive: 11 plays, 72 yards, 4:54.
- CIN – Cole Tabb 58-yard run (pass failed), 6:06. Bearcats 37–18. Drive: 3 plays, 75 yards, 1:36.
- TTU – Quinten Joyner 3-yard run (pass failed), 0:59. Bearcats 37–24. Drive: 7 plays, 64 yards, 1:23.

Statistics	TTU	CIN
First downs	22	21
Plays–yards	76–400	70–427
Rushes–yards	39–173	40–255
Passing yards	227	172
Passing: comp–att–int	24–37–1	19–30–2
Time of possession	30:43	29:17

Team	Category	Player	Statistics
Texas Tech	Passing	Will Hammond	24/37, 227 yards, INT
Texas Tech	Rushing	J'Koby Williams	12 rushes, 81 yards
Texas Tech	Receiving	Kenny Johnson	7 receptions, 81 yards
Cincinnati	Passing	JC French IV	19/30, 172 yards, 4 TD, 2 INT
Cincinnati	Rushing	Cole Tabb	16 rushes, 173 yards, TD
Cincinnati	Receiving	Zylan Perry	4 receptions, 43 yards

=== vs. No. 6 Utah ===
No. 6 Utah Utes (7–0) at Cincinnati Bearcats (5–2) – Game summary

Quarter	1	2	3	4	Total
No. 6 Utes	14	28	7	0	49
Bearcats	3	3	13	6	25

at Nippert Stadium • Cincinnati, Ohio

- Date: October 31
- Game time: 3:45 p.m.
- Game attendance: 36,487
- TV announcers (ESPN): Tom Hart (play-by-play), Roddy Jones (analyst), and Quint Kessenich (sideline)

Statistics	UTAH	CIN
First downs		
Plays–yards		
Rushes–yards		
Passing yards		
Passing: comp–att–int		
Time of possession		

Team	Category	Player	Statistics
Utah	Passing		
Utah	Rushing		
Utah	Receiving		
Cincinnati	Passing		
Cincinnati	Rushing		
Cincinnati	Receiving		

=== at No. 17 Houston ===
Cincinnati Bearcats (5–3) at No. 17 Houston Cougars (6–2) – Game summary

Quarter	1	2	3	4	Total
Bearcats	0	10	7	7	24
No. 17 Cougars	14	7	3	7	31

at TDECU Stadium • Houston, Texas

- Date: November 7
- Game time: 3:30 p.m.
- Game weather: Sunny • Temperature: 79 °F (26 °C) • Wind: E at 11 miles per hour (18 km/h)
- Game attendance: 32,372
- Referee: Kevin Mar
- TV announcers (FOX): Tim Brando (play-by-play), Devin Gardner (analyst), and Josh Sims (sideline)

Game information

First quarter

- HOU – Amare Thomas 8-yard pass from Conner Weigman (Jonathan Dimas kick), 9:04. Cougars 7–0. Drive: 12 plays, 72 yards, 5:50.
- HOU – Amare Thomas 31-yard pass from Conner Weigman (Jonathan Dimas kick), 6:23. Cougars 14–0. Drive: 6 plays, 67 yards, 1:50.

Second quarter

- CIN – Cole Tabb 17-yard pass from JC French IV (Stephen Rusnak kick), 14:16. Cougars 14–7. Drive: 13 plays, 77 yards, 7:02.
- CIN – Stephen Rusnak 28-yard field goal, 5:55. Cougars 14–10. Drive: 11 plays, 51 yards, 5:52.
- HOU – Conner Weigman 2-yard run (Jonathan Dimas kick), 2:30. Cougars 21–10. Drive: 7 plays, 75 yards, 3:20.

Third quarter

- CIN – Gavin Grover 34-yard pass from JC French IV (Stephen Rusnak kick), 10:02. Cougars 21–17. Drive: 10 plays, 80 yards, 4:49.
- HOU – Jonathan Dimas 28-yard field goal, 5:13. Cougars 24–17. Drive: 11 plays, 64 yards, 4:43.

Fourth quarter

- CIN – JC French IV 1-yard run (Stephen Rusnak kick), 6:21. Tied 24–24. Drive: 16 plays, 96 yards, 8:41.
- HOU – Re'Shaun Sanford II 51-yard run (Jonathan Dimas kick), 5:10. Cougars 31–24. Drive: 3 plays, 75 yards, 1:11.

Statistics	CIN	HOU
First downs	30	23
Plays–yards	71–379	59–468
Rushes–yards	41–162	35–241
Passing yards	217	227
Passing: comp–att–int	19–30–0	17–24–0
Time of possession	33:38	26:22

Team	Category	Player	Statistics
Cincinnati	Passing	JC French IV	19/30, 217 yards, 2 TD
Cincinnati	Rushing	Gi'Bran Payne	11 carries, 71 yards
Cincinnati	Receiving	Malachi Henry	6 receptions, 65 yards
Houston	Passing	Conner Weigman	17/24, 227 yards, 2 TD
Houston	Rushing	Re'Shaun Sanford II	15 carries, 126 yards, TD
Houston	Receiving	Amare Thomas	6 receptions, 78 yards, 2 TD

=== at Iowa State ===
Cincinnati Bearcats (5–4) at Iowa State Cyclones (4–5) – Game summary

Quarter	1	2	3	4	Total
Bearcats	0	0	0	0	0
Cyclones	0	0	0	0	0

at Jack Trice Stadium • Ames, Iowa

- Date: November 14
- Game time: 12:00 p.m.
- TV announcers (TNT/TruTV): J. B. Long (play-by-play) and Mike Golic Jr. (analyst)

Statistics	CIN	ISU
First downs		
Plays–yards		
Rushes–yards		
Passing yards		
Passing: comp–att–int		
Time of possession		

Team	Category	Player	Statistics
Cincinnati	Passing		
Cincinnati	Rushing		
Cincinnati	Receiving		
Iowa State	Passing		
Iowa State	Rushing		
Iowa State	Receiving		

=== vs. Colorado ===
Colorado Buffaloes (4–6) at Cincinnati Bearcats (5–5) – Game summary

Quarter	1	2	3	4	Total
Buffaloes	0	0	0	0	0
Bearcats	0	0	0	0	0

at Nippert Stadium • Cincinnati, Ohio

- Date: November 21
- Game time: 12:00 p.m.
- TV announcers (ESPN+): Pete Sousa (play-by-play) and Leger Douzable (analyst)

Statistics	COLO	CIN
First downs		
Plays–yards		
Rushes–yards		
Passing yards		
Passing: comp–att–int		
Time of possession		

Team	Category	Player	Statistics
Colorado	Passing		
Colorado	Rushing		
Colorado	Receiving		
Cincinnati	Passing		
Cincinnati	Rushing		
Cincinnati	Receiving		

=== at BYU ===
Cincinnati Bearcats (0–0) at BYU Cougars (0–0) – Game summary

Quarter	1	2	3	4	Total
Bearcats	0	0	0	0	0
Cougars	0	0	0	0	0

at LaVell Edwards Stadium • Provo, Utah

- Date: November 28
- Game time: 3:30 p.m.
- TV: FOX

Statistics	CIN	BYU
First downs		
Plays–yards		
Rushes–yards		
Passing yards		
Passing: comp–att–int		
Time of possession		

Team	Category	Player	Statistics
Cincinnati	Passing		
Cincinnati	Rushing		
Cincinnati	Receiving		
BYU	Passing		
BYU	Rushing		
BYU	Receiving		

== Personnel ==
=== Roster and staff ===
2026 Cincinnati Bearcats football team roster
Players
Coaches
Offense

Pos.	#	Name	Class
WR	0	Isaiah Johnson	Jr
WR	2	Larenzo Fenner	Sr
RB	3	Cole Tabb	Jr
QB	4	JC French IV	Sr
QB	5	Samaj Jones	Jr
RB	6	Gi'Bran Payne	Sr
RB	7	Zylan Perry	Sr
WR	8	Cade Wolford	Jr
WR	9	Malachi Henry	Sr
QB	10	Liam O'Brien	Sr
WR	11	JV Gibson	Sr
QB	12	Brooks Goodman	Fr
RB	13	Zion Johnson	So
WR	14	Elijah Jones	Jr
QB	15	Will Kocher	Sr
WR	16	Flynn Schiele	Sr
WR	17	H'eij Jackson	Fr
WR	18	Giyahni Kontosis	So
WR	19	Dadrien Waller	Fr
WR	20	Joshua Smith	Fr
QB	22	JJ Miller	Jr
RB	25	James Lewis	Jr
RB	26	Jayzon Thompson	Fr
WR	27	Taizaun Burns	So
WR	37	Ryan Taleb	Jr
WR	39	Christian Moulton	So
OL	50	Evan Tengesdahl	Sr
OL	52	Austin Hoane	Fr
OL	55	Solomon Mathis	Fr
OL	61	Nathan Zappitelli	Fr
OL	63	Zac Clarke	Jr
OL	66	Xavier Lozowicki	Sr
OL	67	Luke Grover	Fr
OL	69	JP Schrieber	Jr
OL	70	Cray Paich	So
OL	71	Judea Milon	Sr
OL	72	Nolan Latulippe	Sr
OL	73	Aiden Pastoriza	Jr
OL	74	Joe Cotton	Sr
OL	75	Marcus McGregor	So
OL	76	Zach Taylor	So
OL	77	Taran Tyo	Sr
OL	78	Grant Edgington	Sr
OL	79	Luke Collins	Fr
WR	80	Jalen Williams	Fr
TE	82	Ka'Maurri Smith	So
TE	83	Devyn Zahursky	Jr
TE	84	Gavin Gregory	Fr
TE	85	Lyviel Waters	Jr
TE	86	Kellen Davis	Jr
TE	87	Gavin Grover	Jr
TE	88	DaMari Witherspoon	So
WR	89	Pierce Ayers	So

Defense

Pos.	#	Name	Class
CB	0	Jacob Finley	Sr
S	2	MJ Cannon	Sr
OLB	3	Antwan Peek Jr.	Sr
DL	4	Marquaze Parker	Jr
OLB	5	Marqavious Saboor	Jr
CB	6	Zay Johnson	Jr
S	7	Ty Goodwill	Jr
CB	8	Kenny Worthy	Jr
ILB	9	Damaine Wilson	Jr
EDGE	10	Patrick Bauer	Sr
DL	11	Chidera Otutu	Jr
ILB	12	Filip Maciorowski	Sr
CB	13	Patrick Williams	So
CB	14	KK Meier	Sr
OLB	15	Jamari Johnson	So
EDGE	16	Jaylon White-McClain	Sr
EDGE	17	Brian Simms III	Sr
S	18	Jasper Beeler	Sr
S	19	CJ Jones	So
S	20	CJ Crite	So
CB	21	Jamarion McKinney	Fr
ILB	22	Jonathan Thompson	Sr
OLB	23	Jaidon Windom	Fr
EDGE	24	Terrell Holcomb	So
CB	25	Daniel James	Jr
DL	26	Cam Roetherford	Sr
S	27	Markell Taylor	Fr
CB	29	Kameron Hurst	Fr
S	30	D'Angelo Hutchinson	Sr
ILB	31	Simeon Coleman	Jr
S	32	Landen Schaefer	So
ILB	33	George Leibold	Jr
EDGE	34	Myles Harrison	So
OLB	35	Drew Robinson	Jr
ILB	36	Evan Weinberg	Fr
ILB	44	Montay Weedon	Jr
ILB	45	Jaxon Newton	Fr
S	46	Xavier Starks	Fr
EDGE	54	Thomas Johnson	Sr
EDGE	60	Lance Dawson	Fr
EDGE	82	James Early	So
DL	88	CD McFee	So
DL	90	Darrius Simmons	Fr
EDGE	91	Drew Logan	Sr
DL	92	Elijah Gunn	Sr
EDGE	93	Keegan Horn	Fr
DL	94	Juan Bates	Fr
DL	95	Josh Hough	Sr
DL	96	Nathan Nunn	Jr
DL	97	Kamron Neal	So
DL	99	Jonathan Rulo	Fr

Special teams

Pos.	#	Name	Class
P	31	Max Fletcher	Sr
P	35	Dino Beslagic	Sr
LS	41	Kenny Baker	Fr
LS	48	Eli Stein	Sr
K	93	Max Lemasters	Sr
K	99	Stephen Rusnak	Sr

Head coach

- Scott Satterfield (Appalachian State) – 4th year

Coordinators/assistant coaches

- Nate Woody (Wofford)
  1st year – (defensive coordinator)
- Mark Speir (Clemson)
  1st year – (assistant head coach)
- Cortney Braswell (Liberty)
  4th year – (co-defensive coordinator / inside linebackers)
- Nic Cardwell (Appalachian State)
  4th year – (co-offensive coordinator / offensive line)
- Pete Thomas (NC State)
  4th year – (co-offensive coordinator / quarterbacks)
- Luke Paschall (Middle Tennessee)
  2nd year – (special teams coordinator)
- Adam Braithwaite (William & Mary)
  2nd year – (outside linebackers)
- Sean Dawkins (Troy)
  3rd year – (running backs)
- David Rowe (Rutgers)
  1st year – (safeties)
- Josh Stepp (Newberry)
  4th year – (tight ends)
- Walter Stewart (Cincinnati)
  5th year – (defensive line)
- Vijay Stingley (Sam Houston State)
  4th year – (wide receivers)
- Larry Murphy (Oklahoma State)
  1st year – (cornerbacks)
- Robert Nunn (Valdosta State)
  1st year – (edge rushers)

Legend

- (C) Team captain
- (S) Suspended
- (I) Ineligible
- Injured
- Redshirt

Roster

== Rankings ==
Ranking movements Legend: ██ Increase in ranking ██ Decrease in ranking — = Not ranked RV = Received votes
	Week															
Poll	Pre	1	2	3	4	5	6	7	8	9	10	11	12	13	14	Final
AP	—	—	—	—	RV	—	—	—	RV	—	—					
Coaches	—	—	—	—	RV	—	—	—	RV	RV	—					
CFP	Not released									—						Not released
