= Peter Sheppard =

Peter Sheppard may refer to:

- Peter Clapham Sheppard (1879–1964), Canadian painter
- P. A. Sheppard (Percival Albert Sheppard, 1907–1977), known as Peter, British meteorologist
- Pete Sheppard (born 1967), radio host
- Peter Sheppard (motorcyclist), rode in 1966 and 1968 Grand Prix motorcycle racing season

== See also ==
- Peter Shepherd (disambiguation)
