= Justin Mazzulla =

American basketball coach

Ottawa Blackjacks
- Position: Head coach
- League: CEBL

Career information
- High school: Bishop Hendricken (Warwick, Rhode Island)
- College: George Washington (2017–2019); Vermont (2020–2022)
- NBA draft: 2022: undrafted

Career history

Coaching
- 2026–present: Ottawa Blackjacks

Justin Mazzulla is an American professional basketball coach and former basketball player who currently serves as the head coach of the Ottawa Blackjacks in the Canadian Elite Basketball League.

== Early life ==
Mazzulla is a native of Johnston, Rhode Island and attended high school at Bishop Hendricken High School. His older brother is Joe Mazzulla, currently the head coach of the Boston Celtics. He is the son of Dan and Latresa Mazzulla. His father Dan Mazzulla was a former basketball player and coach. Both Justin's brother Joe and father Dan were star players in their playing days, with Joe being a top player at Bishop Hendricken and in college at the University of West Virginia while Dan played at Johnston Senior High School and Bryant University.

== Playing career ==
A 3-star recruit, Mazzulla was ranked as the #408 player nationally and #1 player in Rhode Island in the class of 2017 according to 247Sports, receiving offers from Boston College and George Washington before committing to George Washington.

Mazzulla played his first three seasons of college basketball for the George Washington Revolutionaries men's basketball team from 2017 to 2020. On January 31, 2018, during his freshman year, Mazzulla made his first collegiate start in a game against Duquesne. In his sophomore year with the Revolutionaries in the 2018-19 season, Mazzulla averaged a college career-high 8.9 points per game and started all 33 games he played. In two plus years with the Colonials, Mazzulla appeared in 70 games and made 45 starts. On December 29, 2018, Mazzulla scored a then career-high 19 points in a 71-67 win over American University.

In 2020, Mazzulla transferred to the Vermont Catamounts men's basketball team. He played two seasons for the Catamounts in the 2020–21 and 2021-22 seasons, averaging 8.3 points per game in his senior year and 7.5 points per game in his fifth year. On January 17, 2021, Mazzulla recorded a career-high 23 points in an 88-60 win over the University of Maine. In the 2021-2022 season, he was named to the America East Academic Honor Roll.

He was a key piece for the 2021-22 Catamounts that finished the season with a 28-6 overall record, an America East regular season title, America East tournament title, and NCAA tournament appearance. Mazzulla played his final collegiate game on March 17, 2022 in the 2022 NCAA Division I men's basketball tournament in Vermont's 75-71 loss to Arkansas.

== Coaching career ==
After his playing career, Mazzulla was a graduate assistant at the University of Rhode Island.

Mazzulla has been an assistant video coordinator for the Utah Jazz and an assistant coach and video coordinator for the Salt Lake City Stars.

On January 22, 2026, Mazzulla was named the head coach of the Ottawa BlackJacks. Upon his hiring as BlackJacks head coach, Mazzulla became the youngest head coach in CEBL history at the age of 27 years and 26 days at the time of his hiring.
