= Johnston Senior High School =

Location
- 345 Cherry Hill Road; Johnston, Rhode Island 02919; United States
- Coordinates: 41°49′56″N 71°30′05″W

Information
- Type: Public
- Motto: "T.E.A.M. - Together Everyone Achieves More"
- Established: 1968
- Head of school: Donna Pennachia
- Faculty: 90
- Teaching staff: 74.00 (FTE)
- Enrollment: 805 (2023-2024)
- Average class size: 24
- Student to teacher ratio: 10.88
- Hours in school day: 7:17 a.m. - 1:35 p.m.
- Campus: Semi-urban
- Colors: Columbia blue and white
- Mascot: Panther
- Website: johnstonhighschool.com

Johnston Senior High School (JHS) is a public high school located in Johnston, Rhode Island, United States. It is part of the Johnston Public School System and has approximately 900 students in grades 9 through 12. The school colors are Columbia blue and white and the school mascot is the Panther. In 2005, JHS was named a Rhode Island Department of Education Regents' Commended School. The 2018–2019 school year principal is Dennis Morrell.

== Testing ==
The following exams are administered throughout the school year.

=== NECAP ===
New England Common Assessment Program (NECAP) is a Rhode Island State Assessment tests junior students (11) on four key subject areas, reading, writing and mathematics, with science tested in the spring. The program's primary goal is a standardized test based on uniform Grade-Level Expectations (GLEs).

=== RIAA ===
Rhode Island Alternate Assessment (RIAA) was a new 2008 Rhode Island State Assessment that tests students on four key subject areas. This testing is for sophomores (10) and juniors (11). They are tested on reading, writing, mathematics and science.

=== ACCESS for ELLs ===
ACCESS for ELLs is a Rhode Island State Assessment that tests students on English language proficiency. *This test is for sophomores, juniors and seniors (12).

=== PSAT/NMSQT ===
The Preliminary SAT/National Merit Scholarship Qualifying Test is given to sophomores and juniors. It is a practice session for the upcoming SATs. The PSAT/NMSQT is a multiple-choice standardized test administered by the College Board and National Merit Scholarship Corporation. An estimated 1.3 million juniors and sophomores take the test each year. Recently, some ninth, eighth and even seventh graders have also begun taking this test. The scores from the PSAT are used (with the permission of the student) to determine eligibility for the National Merit Scholarship Program.

=== SAT ===
The SAT Reasoning Test is a standardized test for college admissions in the United States. The SAT is administered by the not-for-profit College Board corporation in the United States and is developed, published and scored by the Educational Testing Service (ETS).

== Music ==
The following classes are part of the curriculum for Music education.

Chorus: Students enrolled in Chorus learn how to sing scales, listen properly, read notes, and sing as a choir.

Instrumental band: The Johnston High School Band and Chorus perform at three set concerts every year, Winter Concert at the JHS Auditorium, Spring Concert at the JHS Auditorium. During the last out-of-state competition to Williamsburg, Virginia, the band and chorus competed against other New England States. The band scored second in their division and the chorus were scored first place in their division.

=== Music appreciation, music theory and music history ===
In music appreciation, music theory and music history, students learn about different genres of music, instrument groups, famous music works and historical composers.

== Sports and awards ==
- American football - 2008 Division III Super Bowl champions, 2008 Dick Reynolds Sportsmanship Award winners
- Baseball - 2008 Division II North Regular Season champions
- Softball
- Hockey
- Soccer
- Basketball
- Cheerleader/majorette squads
- Volleyball
- Cross country
- Hockey - 2003 and 2004 Metropolitan Summer Hockey champions (28 straight wins, state record), 2003 MVP Jay Marsland, 2004 MVP Brett Waterman
- Wrestling 2003 Division 1 Champions

== Notable alumni ==
- Jeanine Calkin, state senator
- Pauly D, American television personality and DJ
- Brian Rea, Republican Party member of the Rhode Island House of Representatives
- Mat Franco, magician
- Dan Mazzulla, basketball coach and father of Joe Mazzulla, coach of the Boston Celtics
