= Jeanine Calkin =

American politician

Member of the Rhode Island Senate from the 30th district
- In office January 5, 2021 – January 3, 2023
- Preceded by: Mark McKenney
- Succeeded by: Mark McKenney
- In office January 1, 2017 – December 31, 2018
- Preceded by: William Walaska
- Succeeded by: Mark McKenney

Personal details
- Born: Johnston, Rhode Island
- Party: Democratic
- Spouse: Daniel
- Education: Johnson & Wales University (B.A); Bryant University (M.A.)

Jeanine Calkin is an American politician from the state of Rhode Island. A member of the Democratic Party, she is a former Rhode Island State Senator. Calkin serves as co-chair of the Rhode Island Political Cooperative, a progressive organization.

== Early life and education ==
Calkin is from Johnston, Rhode Island. She graduated from Johnston Senior High School in 1987. Calkin first attended the University of Rhode Island before transferring to Johnson & Wales University, where she earned her Bachelor's Degree in Computer Science. Calkin went on to receive a Master's Degree in Information Services from Bryant University.

During her career, she worked in the billing departments for Rhode Island Hospital and Roger Williams Medical Center, the IT department of Johnson & Wales, as a programmer for GTECH Corporation, and a project manager for Analog Devices.

== Political career ==
Calkin and her husband formed their own company before she decided to start Rhode Island for Bernie Sanders in the 2016 United States Presidential Election. Calkin later organized on behalf of Sanders during his 2020 Presidential Campaign.

Calkin ran for the Rhode Island Senate in 2016, defeating William Walaska. She lost renomination for her seat to Mark McKenney in 2018. She ran against McKenney again in 2020, and won. She was subsequently defeated in the 2022 primary by McKenney once again.

== Personal life ==
Calkin and her husband, Daniel, have lived in Warwick, Rhode Island, since 2012. Her right leg was amputated in April 2021 after a life-threatening infection due to blood clots.
