= Mark McKenney =

American politician

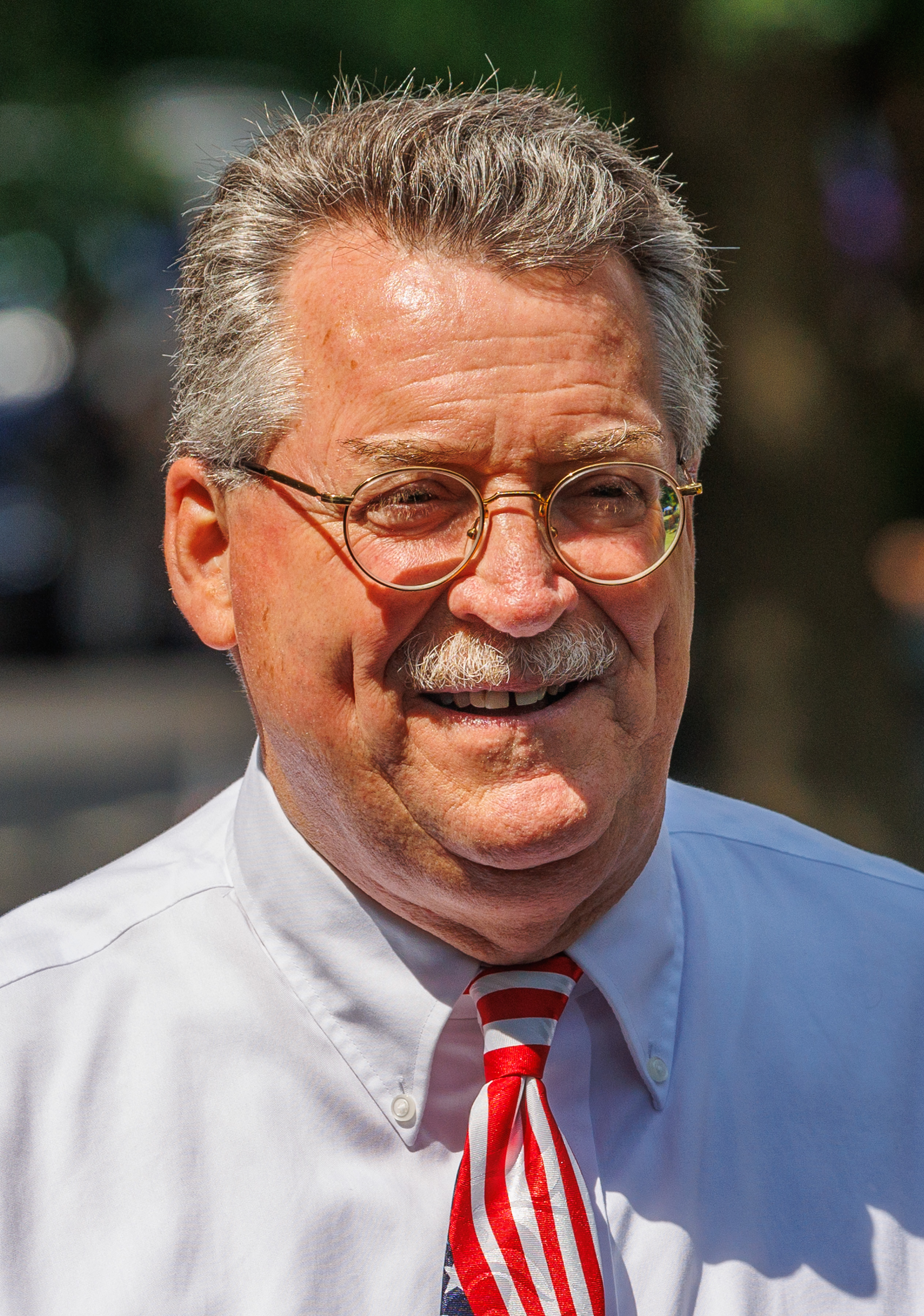

Member of the Rhode Island Senate from the 30th district
- Incumbent
- Assumed office January 3, 2023
- Preceded by: Jeanine Calkin
- In office January 1, 2019 – January 5, 2021
- Preceded by: Jeanine Calkin
- Succeeded by: Jeanine Calkin

Personal details
- Born: October 9, 1956 (age 69)
- Party: Democratic
- Spouse: Tricia McKenney
- Profession: Attorney
- Website: https://www.markmckenney.com

Mark P. McKenney (born October 9, 1956) is an American politician and a Democratic member of the Rhode Island Senate representing District 30.

McKenney attended Bishop Hendricken High School, Boston College, and the Columbus School of Law at Catholic University of America. He also studied at the University of Kent in Canterbury, England.

He is an attorney at McKenney, Quigley, & Clarkin.

He considers himself a moderate. He defeated one-term incumbent Jeanine Calkin in the 2018 primary for the seat. He was defeated by Calkin in a 2020 democratic primary rematch for his seat. He was elected again in November 2022.
