= Peter Shepherd =

Peter Shepherd may refer to:

- Peter Shepherd (racing driver) (born 1986), Canadian NASCAR driver
- Peter Shepherd (British Army officer) (1841–1879), Surgeon Major
- Peter Shepherd, character in Jumanji

== See also ==
- Peter Shepheard (1913–2002), British architect
- Peter Sheppard (disambiguation)
