= Bishop Hendricken High School =

High school in Warwick, Rhode Island

Bishop Hendricken High
- Bishop Hendricken High School seal

Location
- 2615 Warwick Avenue; Warwick, Rhode Island 02889; United States

Information
- Type: Private, all-male, college preparatory
- Motto: "Catholic Values Fostering a Tradition of Excellence"
- Religious affiliation: Roman Catholic
- Established: September, 1959
- School district: Roman Catholic Diocese of Providence
- Principal: Mark R. DeCiccio
- Faculty: 75 full-time
- Grades: 8–12
- Enrollment: 625
- Average class size: 18
- Student to teacher ratio: 13:1
- Colors: Green and gold
- Mascot: Hawk
- Accreditation: New England Association of Schools and Colleges
- Website: www.hendricken.com

Bishop Hendricken High School (or Hendricken) is a Catholic, all-male, college preparatory high school located in Warwick, Rhode Island, in the Roman Catholic Diocese of Providence.

Founded by the Brothers of the Holy Cross in 1959, and named in honor of the first Roman Catholic Bishop of Providence, Thomas Francis Hendricken, the school's faculty was long composed of both lay and religious individuals. The Congregation of Christian Brothers provided staff for the school after the Holy Cross Brothers' departure in 1971 until 2011.

== Academics ==
Hendricken offers instruction in the humanities, arts, and sciences. The school's academic curriculum includes 5 levels of college preparatory instruction, including Advanced Placement and honors tracks. Hendricken's academic departments include: English, Fine Arts, Health/Physical Education, Mathematics, Modern Language, Science, Social Studies, Technology, and Theology.

In 2008–2009, Hendricken launched the Brother Thomas R. Leto Options Program aimed at providing a Catholic high school education for students with mild to moderate developmental disabilities.

In 2015–2016, the school opened its 8th Grade SELECT program for qualified 8th grade boys in Rhode Island, and the neighboring communities of Massachusetts and Connecticut.

In 2024, Hendricken launched a new academic initiative called "Redefining College Prep." The program expanded the school's daily schedule to include additional space and opportunity for students to take a range of elective courses in Arts, Business, Humanities, Social Sciences, and STEM.

== Arts ==
Hendricken offers a comprehensive honors program for arts students, the Arts Academy, and features instruction in drama (acting & technical theater), Music (band & chorus), Media Arts, Visual Arts. The Arts program also offers several electives.

Hendricken's Drama program showcased the U.S. premiere of Shay Healy's musical, The Wiremen. The program offers the opportunity for students to write, develop, direct, design, and produce their own one-act productions for an annual play festival. In 2011, 2015, and 2023 the Drama program represented the state of Rhode Island at the New England Drama Festival for their original plays. In 2012, Hendricken performed as one of 35 schools at the Fringe Festival in Edinburgh, Scotland. The program is in residence at the Dr. Daniel S. Harrop Theater, built in 2006. The theater features 350 seats, a thrust stage, full catwalk grid, lighting, sound and projection systems.

The school also fields the only competitive high school show choir in the state of Rhode Island.

Hendricken's Music programs include concert band, wind ensemble, jazz band, string ensemble, percussion ensemble, pep band, and two choirs. Bands have performed at the St. Patrick's Day Parade in New York City, Meyerhoff Hall in Baltimore, and Walt Disney World. The chorus has performed in Italy where they sang for Pope Benedict at the Vatican and performed at the Chair of St. Peter in the Basilica; Ireland, Spain, Portugal, Hawaii, New York City, Universal Studios, and Walt Disney World.

Hendricken also offers programs in Media Arts, including: digital photography, digital media, film editing, screenwriting, and filmmaking. Each Spring, student work is featured at the SENE Film Festival in Providence. In 2006, the school built a digital production suite, NI-RO-PE Digital Media Studio. The school also offers programs in Visual Arts, including: ceramics, paint, pen and ink, and printmaking. Students have been awarded Silver and Gold Keys at the Scholastic Art Competition.

== Athletics ==
Bishop Hendricken is a member of the Rhode Island Interscholastic League (RIIL). The school offers 15 sports in RIIL competition, including: Baseball, Basketball, Cross Country, Esports, Football, Golf, Hockey, Indoor Track & Field, Lacrosse, Outdoor Track & Field, Soccer, Swimming, Tennis, Volleyball, and Wrestling. To date, the school touts 245+ Rhode Island state championships. Hendricken has a long-standing rivalry with fellow Catholic school, La Salle Academy.

Hendricken's Football program has more Rhode Island Super Bowl appearances than any other school in the state, and boasts 18 championships since 1968. The school was the first in Rhode Island history to win seven consecutive state titles from 2010 to 2016, during which the team accrued a 76–6 record. The team is coached by Keith Croft.

The school also offers two club teams. Hendricken's Rugby team was the first offered by a high school in Rhode Island. In 2019, Pilgrim High School and La Salle Academy have also created teams and formed the Rhode Island Rugby League (RIRL) and hope to expand as a league. The team travels to tournaments around New England for competition, and plays a full Spring season against schools from Massachusetts and Connecticut. In 2010, Hendricken won the New England Rugby Championship, and has earned 3 Massachusetts Youth Rugby Organization Championships. In addition, the school also offers a Sailing team that competes out of the East Greenwich Yacht Club.

Hendricken also offers 2 Unified Sports, Volleyball and Basketball, through the RIIL and Special Olympics of Rhode Island. The programs are intended for members of the school's Options Program to compete alongside partner athletes from the general school community against other Rhode Island Unified Sports teams. In 2018, Bishop Hendricken was recognized as a National Banner Unified Champion School by Special Olympics.

== Controversies ==
=== John Walderman, former principal ===
In 1986, Principal John Walderman was arrested for soliciting sex from an underage boy. The case was dismissed a year later. When it was discovered that Walderman had then been reassigned to another all-boys' high school in Harlem, New York, he became a notable figure in the sexual abuse scandal in the Congregation of Christian Brothers.

=== Timothy J. Sheldon, former vice principal ===
Former vice principal Timothy J. Sheldon pleaded no contest to one count of solicitation of sex to a child on Thursday, February 10, 2005. Sheldon, who had worked at the school for over 10 years, was charged with two counts of indecent solicitation of a minor, according to TurnTo10. He allegedly had a sexually explicit discussion in an online chat room with who Sheldon believed to be a 14-year-old boy. Sheldon was arrested on 17 December 2004. At age 39, Sheldon was sentenced to five years probation and was forced to surrender his state teaching certificate and was ordered to complete sex offender counseling. He is also not to be employed in any job involving contact with minors in the future and to not use the Internet.

=== John A. Jackson, former president ===
Jackson attracted criticism after writing a letter to the editor of The Providence Journal titled "Obama's immoral position on gay marriage". A Facebook group was created to protest Jackson's comments, attracting hundreds of students and alumni.

=== Joseph T. Brennan, Jr., former principal ===
Former principal Joseph "Jay" Brennan resigned from his position on January 17, 2018, after a video depicting him using racial profanity to refer to African Americans and followers of Judaism was anonymously sent to WPRI. The six-second video was secretly recorded in the office of the principal, which was then emailed to WPRI. WPRI reporter Walt Buteau published an article detailing the incident.

The video in question was also shown to the president of the Providence division of the NAACP, who called the language used "unacceptable." The public video has been edited to remove profanity. Two official statements have been made, one statement by Bishop Thomas Tobin, the other statement by then-school president John A. Jackson.

=== Wrongful termination suit ===
On June 13, 2018, David Marsocci, a former educator at the school, filed suit for wrongful termination. Marsocci alleged that another teacher used a school computer to seek sexual encounters, and when school administrators decided not to take action against that teacher, Marsocci started a website to blow the whistle on the teacher and administrators. School president John Jackson has said their investigation found the allegations were meritless, and claims that Marsocci fabricated evidence. The litigation remains pending in Kent County Superior Court, in Warwick, RI. Prior to the lawsuit, in 2017, the Department of Labor and Training ruled that the school did not have a policy covering the reason for termination, qualifying Marsocci to receive unemployment benefits.

== Notable alumni ==
- Noel Acciari, hockey player
- Rocco Baldelli, baseball player and manager of the Minnesota Twins
- Billy Baron, basketball player
- Jeff Beliveau, Tampa Bay Rays
- Will Blackmon, American football player
- John Burke, member of the Rhode Island Senate
- Frank T. Caprio, former Rhode Island state treasurer
- Alex Clemmey, baseball player
- David Emma, former professional ice hockey player
- Steve Furness, American football player
- Michael King, San Diego Padres
- James Langevin, U.S. representative for Rhode Island
- Ricky Ledo, former NBA player
- David Lynch, college football quarterback
- Michael Malone, 2022-2023 NBA Champion Head Coach, Denver Nuggets
- Joe Mazzulla, basketball player & 2023-2024 NBA Champion Head Coach, Boston Celtics
- Justin Mazzulla, basketball player and coach
- Michael McCaffrey, Rhode Island Senate majority leader
- John J. McConnell Jr., judge
- Mark McKenney, member of the Rhode Island Senate
- Ross Mirkarimi, San Francisco supervisor (Class of 1980)
- Craig Mullaney, United States Army veteran; author of The Unforgiving Minute: A Soldier’s Education
- Nolan North, actor and voice actor
- Jason Onye, college football player
- Thomas Pannone, baseball player
- Kwity Paye, American football player
- Pete Sheppard, Boston sports talk radio host
- Matt Sherry, American football player
- Xavier Truss, American football player
