= David Lynch (quarterback) =

American football player (born 2004)

No. 16 – Holy Cross Crusaders
- Position: Quarterback
- Class: Redshirt Junior

Personal information
- Born: May 4, 2004 (age 22); East Greenwich, Rhode Island, U.S.
- Listed height: 6 ft 3 in (1.91 m)
- Listed weight: 220 lb (100 kg)

Career information
- High school: Bishop Hendricken (Warwick, Rhode Island); IMG Academy (Bradenton, Florida)
- College: Pittsburgh (2023–2025); Holy Cross (2026–present)
- Stats at ESPN

David Conroy Lynch Jr. (born May 4, 2004) is an American college football quarterback for the Holy Cross Crusaders. He previously played for the Pittsburgh Panthers.

== Early life ==
Lynch was born on May 4, 2004, in East Greenwich, Rhode Island. He was a three-sport athlete, playing baseball, basketball, and football. He attended Bishop Hendricken High School in Warwick, Rhode Island, before transferring as a post-graduate to IMG Academy in Bradenton, Florida. In his senior season for Bishop Hendricken, he threw for 942 yards and nine touchdowns. He also added two more touchdowns on the ground. In his lone year with IMG Academy, he led the team to the post-grad national championship where he threw for 231 yards and four touchdowns in the first half alone of the teams' victory. On the year he had over twenty touchdowns and led the team to a 9–2 record.

== College career ==
Lynch committed to Pittsburgh on January 7, 2023, as a preferred walk-on (PWO) after receiving the offer from Pittsburgh coach Jon DiBiaso. Lynch also had an offer from Rhode Island but ultimately chose Pittsburgh.

Lynch did not play in any games during the 2023 season and was redshirted.

During the 2024 season, he played in the final three games of the season and started one of them against Toledo in the 2024 GameAbove Sports Bowl. He finished the season with completing 16 out of 27 passing attempts for 111 yards and three interceptions.
