= Dan Mazzulla =

American basketball player and coach (1958–2020)

Personal information
- Born: May 29, 1958 Cranston, Rhode Island, U.S.
- Died: April 22, 2020 (aged 61) Johnston, Rhode Island, U.S.
- Listed height: 6 ft 4 in (1.93 m)
- Listed weight: 200 lb (91 kg)

Career information
- High school: Johnston (Johnston, Rhode Island)
- College: Bryant (1976–1980)
- NBA draft: 1980: undrafted
- Playing career: 1980–1985
- Position: Small forward

Career history

Coaching
- 1989–2011: Johnston HS (girls)

Daniel E. Mazzulla Jr. (May 29, 1958 – April 22, 2020) was an American basketball player and coach.

== Career ==
Mazzulla attended Johnston Senior High School in Johnston, Rhode Island, where he led the team to two Suburban Division championships in 1974 and 1975 as well as a runner-up finish in 1976. He was named to the second-team All-State selection in 1976 and was a three-time all-league selection. Mazzulla became a standout in college at Bryant, leading the team to two NCAA Division II Tournament appearances from 1976 to 1980. As a junior, he averaged 16.8 points and 8.6 rebounds per game and was named to the Sacred Heart Classic All-Tourney team. He became a team captain as a senior. Mazzulla finished with 1,390 points, which is 10th all time, and 761 rebounds, fourth all-time.

After graduating, Mazzulla played professionally for five years in Chile. He coached boys basketball, girls basketball, and boys soccer and track at Johnston High School. He was also an assistant volleyball coach at the high school. Mazzulla led the girls basketball team to Division II titles in 1998, 2000 and 2002. In 2003, Mazzulla became the Johnston Parks and Recreation Director. He would frequently hire players he coached for part-time positions in the recreation department. As a coach, Mazzulla was known for embracing a tough brand of basketball that emphasized players reaching their potential.

In 2007, Mazzulla was inducted into the Bryant Hall of Fame. He retired as head coach of the Johnston girls' basketball team in 2011, citing his heavy workload and travel schedule. Mazzulla was diagnosed with a brain tumor in 2019 but continued coaching his grandson's recreation basketball team. His family established the "Team Danny" foundation to raise funds for cancer research. Mazzulla retired as recreation director on January 1, 2020.

== Personal life ==
Mazzulla had three children: Joe, current head coach for the Boston Celtics; Justin, who played at Vermont before becoming a graduate assistant at Rhode Island; and Gianna, who played under her father at Johnston. Justin is now an assistant video coordinator for the Utah Jazz.

Mazzulla died of cancer on April 22, 2020; he was 61 years old.
