= Cole Tabb =

American football player

No. 3 – Cincinnati Bearcats
- Position: Running back
- Class: Junior

Personal information
- Listed height: 5 ft 8 in (1.73 m)
- Listed weight: 200 lb (91 kg)

Career information
- High school: Choctawhatchee (Fort Walton Beach, Florida)
- College: Stanford (2024–2025); Cincinnati (2026–present)
- Stats at ESPN

Cole Tabb is an American college football running back for the Cincinnati Bearcats. He previously played for the Stanford Cardinal.

== Early life ==
Tabb attended Choctawhatchee High School in Fort Walton Beach, Florida. He was the 2022–2023 Northwest Florida Daily News Male Athlete of the Year and USA Today 3S Offensive Player of the Year after rushing for 2,407 yards. He committed to Stanford University to play college football.

== College career ==
In his first year at Stanford in 2024, Tabb played in three games and had 130 yards on 27 carries. In 2025, he started three of 11 games, rushing 114 times for 445 with three touchdowns. After the season, Tabb entered the transfer portal and committed to the University of Cincinnati. He entered his first season at Cincinnati in 2026 splitting carries with Gi'Bran Payne.

=== College statistics ===
Legend
**Bold**	Career high

Year	Team	Games		Rushing				Receiving			
Year	Team	GP	GS	Att	Yds	Avg	TD	Rec	Yds	Avg	TD
2024	Stanford	3	2	27	130	4.8	0	2	9	4.5	0
2025	Stanford	**11**	3	**114**	445	3.9	**3**	4	22	5.5	0
2026	Cincinnati	7	1	65	**621**	**9.6**	**9**	**14**	**139**	**9.9**	**3**
Career		21	6	206	1196	5.8	12	20	170	8.5	3

== Personal life ==
Tabb's uncle, Desi Relaford is a former Major League Baseball infielder.
