= CSB Media Arts Center =

Coordinates: 41.7006861°N 72.8568437°W

Connecticut School of Broadcasting
- Active: 1964–present
- Administrative staff: 150 (est)
- Location: Farmington, Connecticut, US
- Campus: 4 campuses located in Connecticut, Florida, and New Jersey.
- Website: gocsb.com

CSB Media Arts Center was originally founded as Connecticut School of Broadcasting in 1964 by Dick Robinson as a small, private school in Connecticut. Known now as CSB Media Arts Center, it is the largest group of Digital Media Arts Schools (Broadcast Media School, Code School, Social Media Marketing School, and Film Schools) that trains students for careers in emerging technologies.

The Web Developer Program prepares students for entry-level work as a Jr. Web Developer, such as learning to code. The full stack course is taught by industry professionals, and the curriculum was chosen specifically to suit the needs of the local job market. Students learn to understand coding logic using web design involving HTML, CSS, Bootstrap, relational databases using SQL, PHP and JavaScript.

The Social Media Marketing Specialist Program's intent is to teach students how to use social media as a tool to increase brand awareness, obtain leads, and increase sales.

The Digital Filmmaking Program trains students how to write, shoot, direct, and edit their own short, character-driven comedy, drama, or horror short films. Students can also have the option of creating a television pilot. Students will shoot on HD cameras, learn industry standard lighting techniques, and edit on Adobe Premiere Pro. Students train in small group classes and are taught by industry professionals. The training program has four main components: screen-writing, pre-production, production, and post-production.

CSB Media Arts Center is home to the Legacy Broadcast Media Program of Connecticut School of Broadcasting. The Broadcast Media Program is a hands-on, learn-by-doing program designed to train students in audio and video production, podcasting, sports, radio, television and more. On-Air and Behind-the-scenes.

The CSB Media Arts Center has four campuses with two in CT, one in NJ, and one FL of the United States. Not all campuses offer the same programs.

== Overview ==
Founded in 1964 by Dick Robinson as a small, private school in Connecticut, CSB now has 4 campuses along the east coast. It has evolved to become the CSB Media Arts Center offering the legacy Connecticut School of Broadcasting Broadcast Media (Broadcast Media School), Web Development (Code School), Social Media Marketing (Social Media Marketing School), Digital Filmmaking (Film School), Mobile Application Design and Development. CSB Media Arts Center is the nation's largest group of Digital Media Arts Schools.

== Instructional methods ==
Day and evening classes are offered. Classes are taught by industry professionals who work in the business and become network sources for students and grads. CSB Media Arts Center uses a seasonal semester schedule, providing 8-week day and 16-week evening classes in March, July and November. All schools teach in either a hybrid model where a portion of the program is taught online and hands-on training happens on-site at the campus studios. Some programs are offered 100% online. Inquire within your local campus. Most Schools are VA Approved and our FL Campus is a partner with Career Source Broward, and Career Source Palm Beach County

== Facilities ==
CSB Media Arts Center has multiple campuses in the continental United States, primarily in larger cities, offering its students and alumni, in good standing, use of their equipment and labs/studios, for the life of the school. Programs are offered in the cities as follows:

- Farmington, Connecticut [Hartford area]
- Stratford, Connecticut [Bridgeport–New Haven area]
- Cherry Hill, New Jersey [Philadelphia area]
- North Palm Beach, Florida
