= Lift for Life Academy =

Charter school district in St. Louis, Missouri, United States

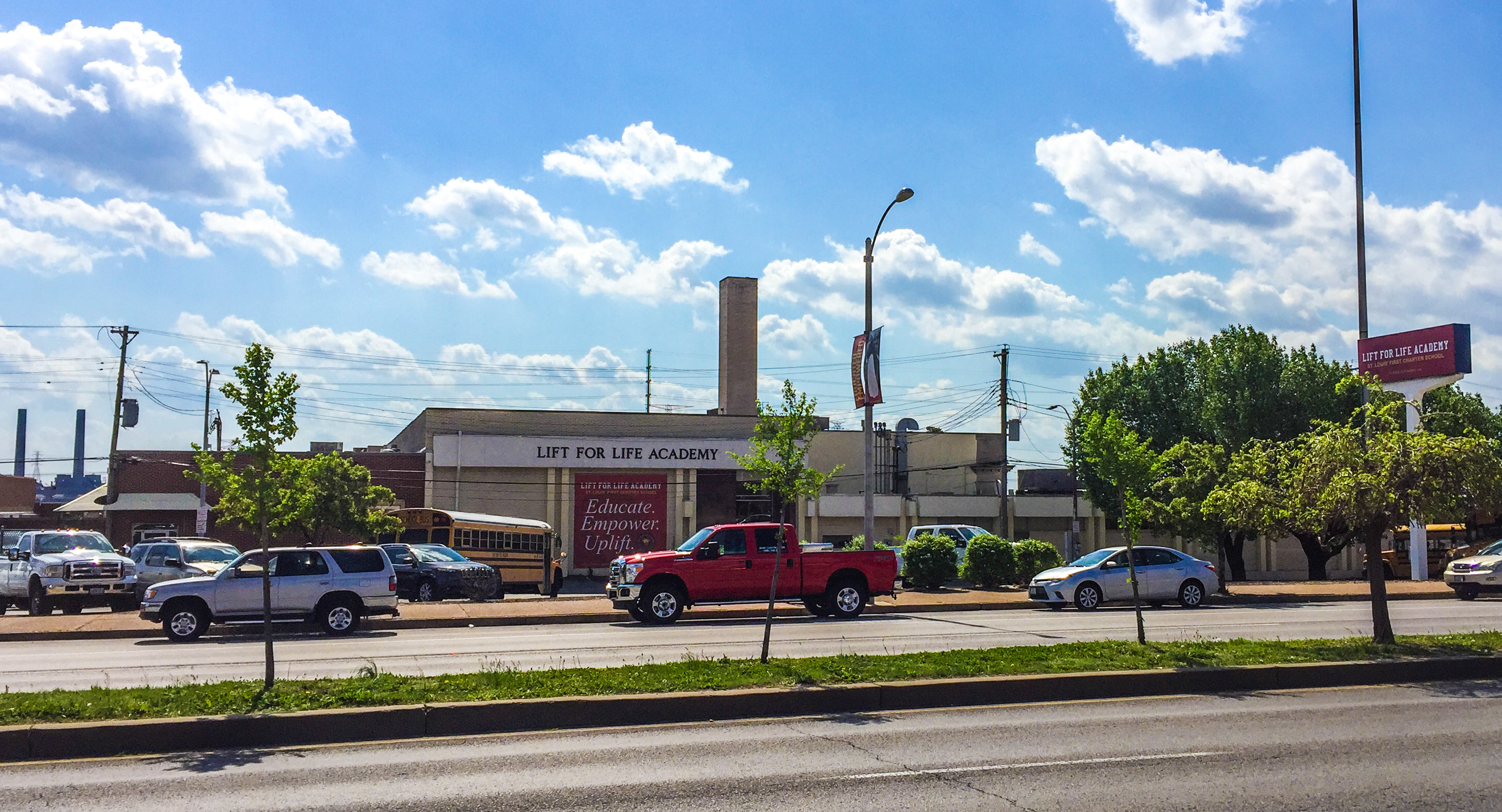

Location
- 1731 South Broadway; St. Louis, Missouri 63104; United States; 38°36′32″N 90°11′59″W

Information
- Type: Public charter school
- Established: 2000; 26 years ago
- Executive director: Marshall Cohen
- Faculty: 70.2 (on FTE basis)
- Grades: PK–12
- Enrollment: 865 (2024–25)
- Student to teacher ratio: 12.3:1
- Colors: Red, black, and gold
- Website: liftforlifeacademy.org

Lift for Life Academy (LFLA) is a public charter school in St. Louis, Missouri. It is composed of three schools—Lift for Life Elementary, Lift for Life Middle, and Lift for Life High—serving students in pre-kindergarten through grade 12. The academy has been sponsored by Southeast Missouri State University since opening in 2000.

== History ==
Lift for Life Academy developed from Lift for Life Gym, a nonprofit youth organization founded by Marshall Cohen in St. Louis in 1988. After observing that many of the gym's participants were struggling academically, Cohen established a school alongside the youth program. His wife, Carla Cohen, wrote the school's charter. In 2000, LFLA opened as a small middle school inside Lift for Life Gym with 65 students enrolled.

In 2008, LFLA expanded with the establishment of its high school, graduating its first senior class of 70 students in 2012.

LFLA purchased the former Metropolitan Community Church building, which was adjacent to the LFLA campus, for $1.8 million to establish an elementary school in its place. This elementary school held its first day of class on August 14, 2019.

== Academics ==
Lift for Life Academy serves students from pre-kindergarten through grade 12: Lift for Life Elementary serves PK–4; Lift for Life Middle serves 5–8; and Lift for Life High serves 9–12.

LFLA's SOAR program allows juniors and seniors to pursue career-oriented pathways and participate in paid internships during the school day. Students currently have the option to choose between eight different pathways: arts and design; business and entrepreneurship; computer science; culinary; fashion; health sciences; social justice and civil service; and trades.

== Athletics ==
Lift for Life's athletic teams are called the Hawks. The school participates in MSHSAA-sanctioned boys' and girls' cross country, football, girls' volleyball, boys' and girls' basketball, boys' and girls' wrestling, boys' and girls' track and field, cheerleading, and girls' flag football.

The girls' basketball team has won four state championships: 2021 (Class 3), 2024 (Class 4), 2025 (Class 5), and 2026 (Class 5).

In 2025, the football team reached the Class 3 state championship, where it lost to Seneca 33–26. In 2021, the boys' basketball team finished fourth in Class 3. The boys' track and field team finished third for Class 3 in 2025.
