= Joe Mazzulla =

American basketball coach (born 1988)

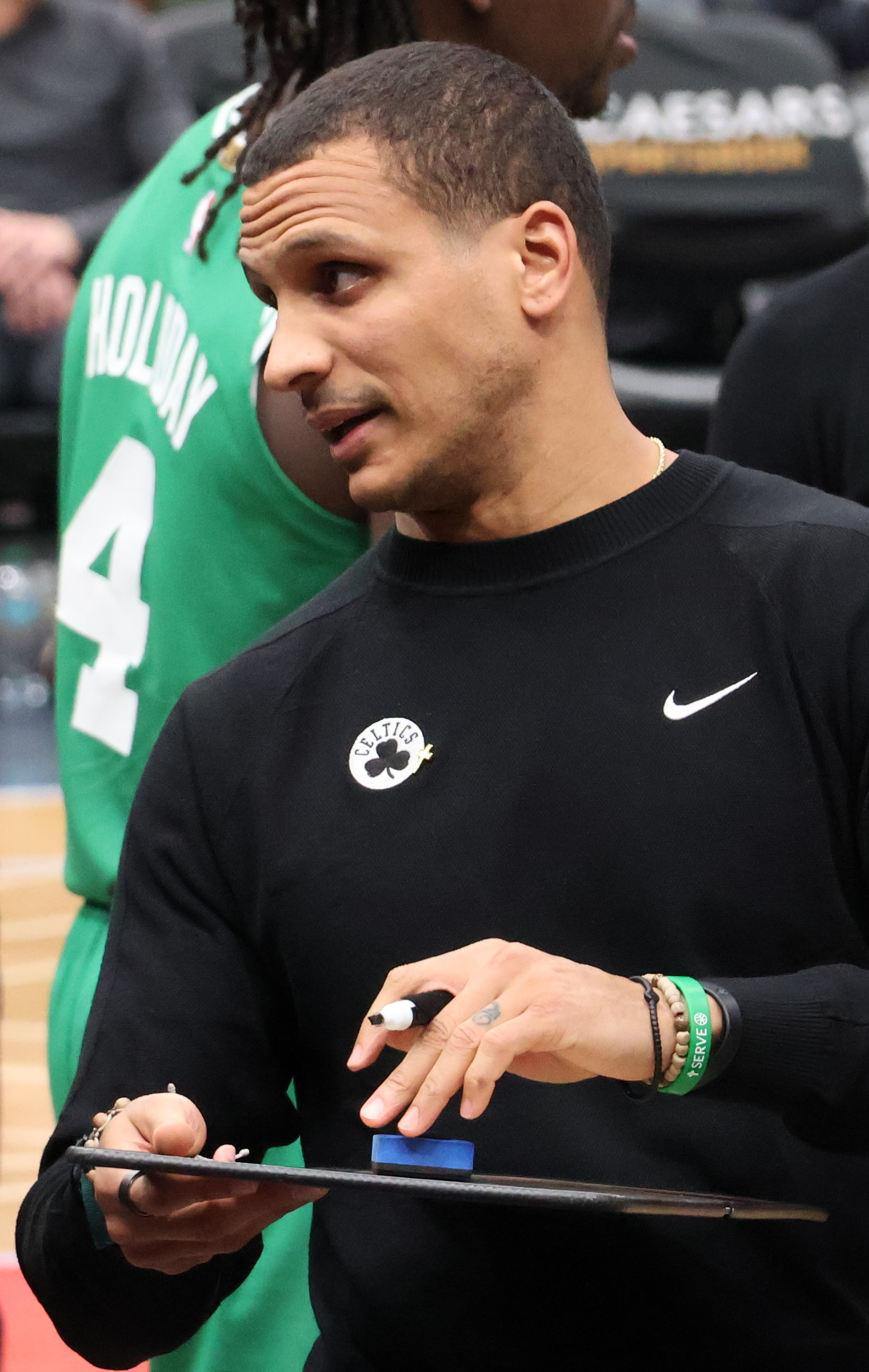
- Mazzulla with the Boston Celtics in 2024

Boston Celtics
- Title: Head coach
- League: NBA

Personal information
- Born: June 30, 1988 (age 38) Johnston, Rhode Island, U.S.
- Listed height: 6 ft 2 in (1.88 m)
- Listed weight: 200 lb (91 kg)

Career information
- High school: Bishop Hendricken (Warwick, Rhode Island)
- College: West Virginia (2006–2011)
- NBA draft: 2011: undrafted
- Position: Point guard
- Coaching career: 2011–present

Career history

Coaching
- 2011–2013: Glenville State (assistant)
- 2013–2016: Fairmont State (assistant)
- 2016–2017: Maine Red Claws (assistant)
- 2017–2019: Fairmont State
- 2019–2022: Boston Celtics (assistant)
- 2022 (Note: Interim from September 22, 2022; permanent from February 16, 2023.)–present: Boston Celtics

Career highlights
- NBA champion (2024); NBA Coach of the Year (2026); NBA All-Star Game head coach (2023)

Joseph Arthur Mazzulla (born June 30, 1988) is an American professional basketball coach who is the head coach for the Boston Celtics of the National Basketball Association (NBA). He played college basketball for the West Virginia Mountaineers as a point guard.

Following his collegiate career, Mazzulla went undrafted in the 2011 NBA draft, and chose to pursue a career in coaching at the college level. He coached at Glenville State and Fairmont State as an assistant coach for three seasons each before being hired to be an assistant coach for the Maine Red Claws in 2016. In 2017, Mazzulla was rehired at Fairmont State, this time as their basketball program's head coach. After these stints of coaching at the collegiate level and in the NBA D-League, he joined the Celtics as an assistant coach in 2019.

In September 2022, Mazzulla was named the interim head coach of the Celtics after head coach Ime Udoka was suspended for the entire season. Mazzulla was named the full-time head coach in February 2023 after leading the team to a league-best 42–17 record at the NBA All-Star break. In his second season, Mazzulla led the Celtics to a league-best 64 wins and an NBA Championship. He currently holds the highest winning percentage of any coach in NBA history with over 200 games coached. Mazzulla is also the youngest head coach to win the NBA Finals since Bill Russell did so in 1969 as a player-coach and is the ninth-youngest head coach to win the Finals in NBA history.

Mazzulla has been noted in both NBA media and in general for his eccentric attitudes towards the game, his players, and the wins and losses he faces, leading some to nickname him Psycho Joe.

== Early life ==
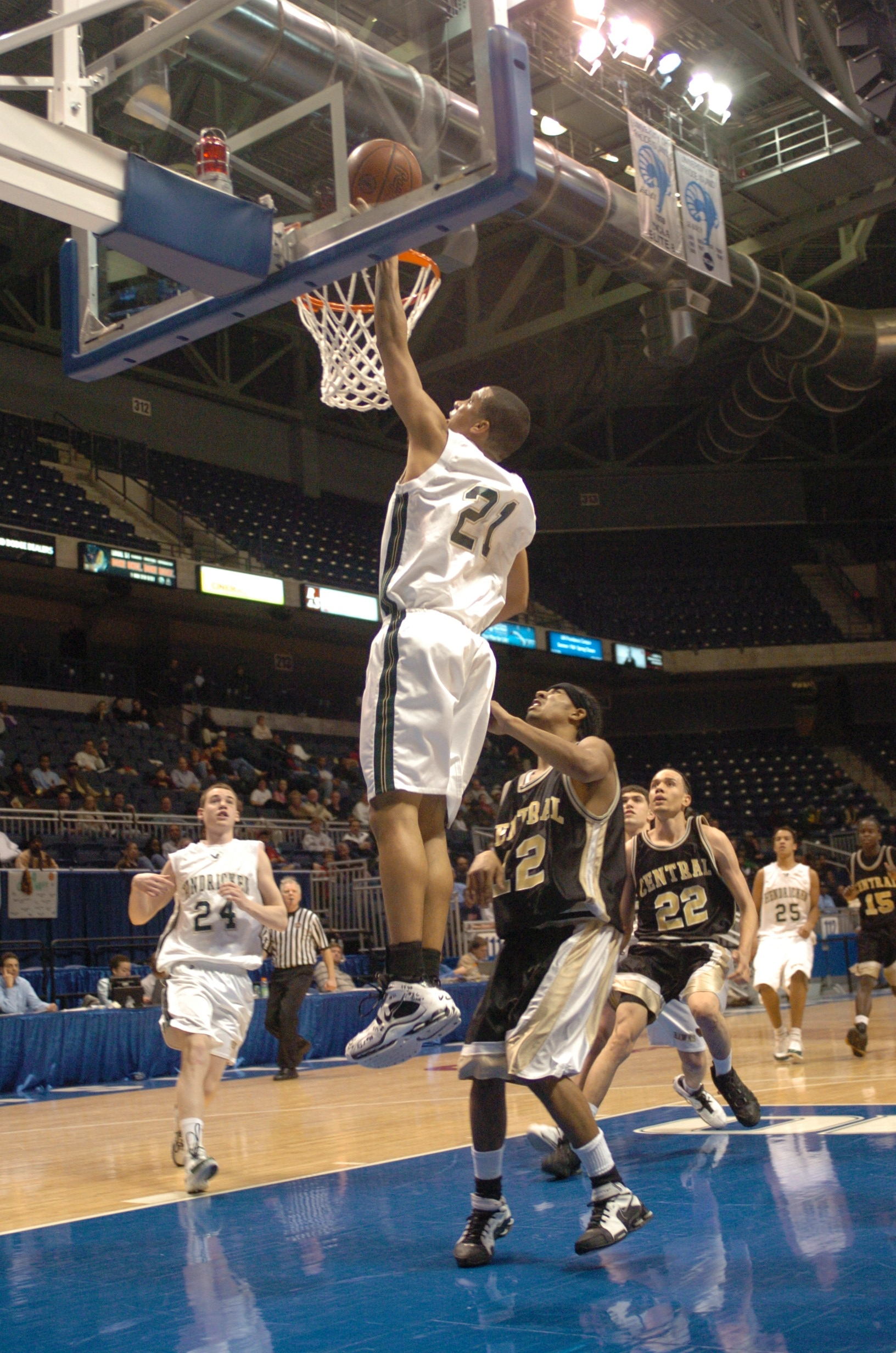
Mazzulla in 2005

Joseph Mazzulla was born to Daniel Mazzulla Jr., an Italian American, and Latresa Mazzulla, an African American, on June 30, 1988, in Johnston, Rhode Island. He attended Bishop Hendricken High School in Rhode Island, making the all-state first team. Mazzulla won three state titles as a point guard at Bishop Hendricken, with his third as a senior on a last-second shot. As a senior, Mazzulla was injured in a car accident, sustaining no major injuries.

== College career ==
As a freshman at West Virginia, Mazzulla helped the team win the 2007 National Invitation Tournament under coach John Beilein.

In the 2008 NCAA tournament, Mazzulla posted 13 points, 11 rebounds, and eight assists in a second-round upset of Duke. He was forced to redshirt the 2008–09 season due to a shoulder injury against Ole Miss, as his growth plate never fused with his shoulder. Mazzulla was unsure if he would ever play again, but practiced for two hours a day and underwent surgery to make a comeback.

In April 2009, Mazzulla was arrested for domestic battery at a bar in Morgantown, West Virginia, and was suspended by coach Bob Huggins. Around this time, Mazzulla received a phone call from Mountaineer legend Jerry West. West criticized Mazzulla for failing to live up to expectations and pleaded with him not to waste his talents any longer. Mazzulla credits this call for helping to set him on the right path.

As a redshirt junior, Mazzulla was named a captain and helped West Virginia reach the 2010 Final Four, where the Mountaineers lost to eventual champion Duke. In the game prior, he scored a then-career-high 17 points in the Elite Eight upset of Kentucky.

As a senior, Mazzulla averaged 7.7 points and 3.8 rebounds per game.

In his collegiate career, Mazzulla recorded 700 points and 340 assists.

== Coaching career ==
=== College coaching career ===
Shortly after graduating from college, Mazzulla was offered a coaching job at Nova Southeastern but turned it down to pursue professional playing opportunities. He joined Glenville State as an assistant in September 2011 after he was unable to find any professional playing opportunities.

In 2013, Mazzulla was hired as an assistant at Fairmont State under Jerrod Calhoun. During the 2016–17 season, Mazzulla served as an assistant for the Maine Red Claws of the NBA D-League.

Mazzulla was named head coach of Fairmont State in March 2017. During his second season, Mazzulla led the team to a 22–9 record and an appearance in the 2019 NCAA Division II tournament, where they lost in the first round to Mercyhurst, 63–60, in overtime.

=== Boston Celtics ===
==== Assistant coach ====
On June 24, 2019, Mazzulla was hired as an assistant coach of the Boston Celtics. In 2022, he interviewed with the Utah Jazz for their head coaching vacancy, but the position ultimately went to fellow Celtics assistant coach Will Hardy.

==== Head coach ====
===== 2022–23 season: First season =====
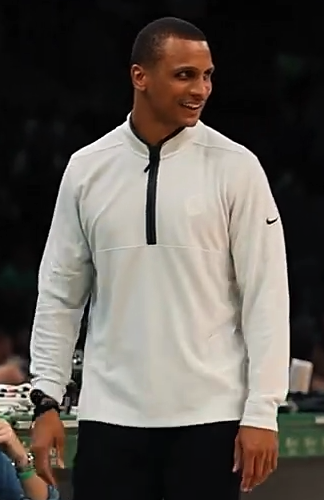
Mazzulla in 2022

On September 22, 2022, just days before the beginning of training camp, Mazzulla was named interim head coach for the Celtics after Ime Udoka was suspended for the entire 2022–23 season due to violating team policies. On December 1, Mazzulla was named Eastern Conference Coach of the Month for October and November after the Celtics began the season with a league-best 18–4 record.

On January 30, 2023, Mazzulla was named the head coach for Team Giannis for the 2023 NBA All-Star Game. A few weeks later on February 16, the Celtics officially named him the 19th head coach in franchise history and signed Mazzulla to a contract extension after he led the team to a league-best 42–17 record at the NBA All-Star break. In April, Mazzulla was named one of three finalists for NBA Coach of the Year. The Celtics entered the playoffs as the #2-seed in the Eastern Conference with a 57–25 record. They went on to beat the Atlanta Hawks in six games during the first round and the Philadelphia 76ers in seven games during the Eastern Conference Semifinals. However, the Celtics lost to the #8-seed Miami Heat during the Eastern Conference Finals in seven games, where Boston lost the first three games of the series. Despite losing the series, the Celtics became just the fourth team in league history to force a Game 7 after trailing 3–0 in a playoff series, and the first since the 2002–03 Portland Trail Blazers. During Game 7, star Jayson Tatum rolled his ankle less than a minute into the game and played through the injury, but was noticeably hindered for the rest of the game.

===== 2023–24 season: First NBA Championship =====
Mazzulla was retained as head coach for the 2023–24 season and received the endorsement of President of Basketball Operations Brad Stevens, who called him "a terrific leader" and "accountable".

During the season, Mazzulla earned two Eastern Conference Coach of the Month awards, one in December and another in March. With a league-best 64–18 record, the Celtics had their first 60+ win season since 2009 and took the top overall seed in the NBA along with home-court advantage throughout the playoffs for the first time since their last championship season. The Celtics went on to beat the Miami Heat and Cleveland Cavaliers in five games during the first round and Eastern Conference Semifinals, respectively. After completing a 4–0 sweep of the Indiana Pacers in the Eastern Conference Finals, Mazzulla, at age 35, became the youngest head coach to make the NBA Finals since Bill Russell in 1969. The Celtics went on to defeat the Dallas Mavericks in five games during the 2024 NBA Finals, giving Mazzulla his first NBA championship. Mazzulla also became the youngest head coach to win the NBA Finals in over 50 years.

===== 2024–25 season =====
Mazzulla was named Eastern Conference Coach of the Month in March after the Celtics finished the month with a 14–1 record, including a perfect 8–0 record on the road. They ultimately finished with a 61–21 record to clinch their 26th Atlantic Division and finished as the #2-seed in the East for the playoffs, behind the No. 1 ranked Cleveland Cavaliers. The Celtics beat the Orlando Magic in five games during the first round, but lost to the New York Knicks in six games during the Eastern Conference Semifinals, which also saw them lose Jayson Tatum to an Achilles injury in Game 4.

===== 2025–26 season: Contract extension =====
On August 8, 2025, Mazzulla signed a multi-year extension with the Celtics. Despite the absence of Jayson Tatum for most of the season, they still managed to achieve a 56–26 record to clinch their 27th Atlantic Division, and finish once again as the #2-seed in the East for the playoffs, but this time behind the No. 1 ranked Detroit Pistons. The Celtics went on to lose to the Philadelphia 76ers in seven games during the first round despite a 3–1 lead. On May 26, Mazzulla was named the NBA Coach of the Year for the first time in his career.

== Personal life ==
Mazzulla's father, Dan, was of Sicilian descent and was a basketball player and coach who died in 2020. Mazzulla's mother, Latresa, is of African descent. His younger brother, Justin, played basketball at George Washington University before transferring to the University of Vermont. Justin is currently an assistant video coordinator for the Utah Jazz. Mazzulla also has a younger sister, Gianna, who played under her father Dan at Johnston High School.

Mazzulla has been married to Camai Roberson since 2014, whom he met while coaching at Glenville State University in 2011. With Robinson, Mazzulla has a son, Emmanuel Joseph Daniel Mazzulla, and a stepson, Michael Harden.

Mazzulla is a devout Catholic, saying that his identity comes from his "faith" and "purpose". He has also said his dream would being ordained a deacon.

Mazzulla is a fan of Premier League club Manchester City, and has developed a friendship with Manchester City's manager, Pep Guardiola.

Mazzulla actively trains in Brazilian jiu-jitsu and has said that the sport helps him navigate life's challenges. Mazzulla originally began training in 2017, and after becoming head coach of the Celtics five years later, he re-committed to the discipline. Mazzulla has also noted that it helps him connect better with his players.

Mazzulla is known for having an idiosyncratic personality, possessing interesting quirks that shape both his external communications as well as his coaching philosophy. Mazzulla's similarities to former New England Patriots head coach Bill Belichick have been noted by several sources in the media. Both tend to be introverted and reserved regarding their teams' successes and weaknesses, and both have a harsh regard for the media along with interesting "quirks" that define them as their personalities.

== Head coaching record ==
=== College ===
Record table
Season	Team	Overall	Conference	Standing	Postseason
Fairmont State (Mountain East Conference) (2017–2019)
2017–18	Fairmont State	21–8	17–5	3rd	
2018–19	Fairmont State	22–9	18–4	2nd	NCAA Division II First Round
Fairmont State:		43–17 (.717)	35–9 (.795)		
Total:		43–17 (.717)			
National champion Postseason invitational champion Conference regular season champion Conference regular season and conference tournament champion Division regular season champion Division regular season and conference tournament champion Conference tournament champion

=== NBA ===
Legend
Regular season	G	Games coached	W	Games won	L	Games lost	W–L %	Win–loss %
Playoffs	PG	Playoff games	PW	Playoff wins	PL	Playoff losses	PW–L %	Playoff win–loss %

‡	NBA record

Team	Year	G	W	L	W–L%	Finish	PG	PW	PL	PW–L%	Result
Boston	2022–23	82	57	25	.695	1st in Atlantic	20	11	9	.550	Lost in conference finals
Boston	2023–24	82	64	18	.780	1st in Atlantic	19	16	3	.842	Won NBA Finals
Boston	2024–25	82	61	21	.744	1st in Atlantic	11	6	5	.545	Lost in conference semifinals
Boston	2025–26	82	56	26	.683	1st in Atlantic	7	3	4	.429	Lost in first round
Career		328	238	90	.726‡		57	36	21	.632	
