= David McComb (American football) =

American football player

No. 16 – Miami RedHawks
- Position: Quarterback
- Class: Redshirt Freshman

Personal information
- Listed height: 6 ft 4 in (1.93 m)
- Listed weight: 220 lb (100 kg)

Career information
- High school: Edmond Memorial (Edmond, Oklahoma)
- College: Kansas (2025); Miami (Ohio) (2026–present)
- Stats at ESPN

David McComb is an American football quarterback for the Miami RedHawks. He previously played for the Kansas Jayhawks.

== Early life ==
McComb attended Edmond Memorial High School in Edmond, Oklahoma. He was rated as a three-star recruit by 247Sports and committed to play college football for the Kansas Jayhawks.

== College career ==
=== Kansas ===
Heading into his freshman season in 2025, McComb enrolled early at the University of Kansas, as he competed for the backup quarterback spot with Cole Ballard and Isaiah Marshall. He did not play in any games that season, after which he entered the NCAA transfer portal.

=== Miami (Ohio) ===
McComb transferred to play for the Miami RedHawks. Heading into the 2026 season, he was named the RedHawks' starting quarterback.
