= Christopher Columbus High School (Miami-Dade County, Florida) =

Catholic college preparatory school

Coordinates: 25.74164°N 80.338621°W

- Columbus

Location
- 3000 SW Galloway Road (87th Avenue); Westchester, Miami, (Miami-Dade), Florida 33165-3293; United States of America

Information
- Type: Private, Catholic, college preparatory
- Motto: ¡Adelante!/Forward!
- Religious affiliations: Roman Catholic, Marist Brothers
- Denomination: Roman Catholic, Marist
- Patron saint: St. Marcellin Champagnat
- Established: 1958
- Founder: Marist Brothers
- Status: Open
- School district: Archdiocese of Miami
- Oversight: Marist Brothers, Archdiocese of Miami
- President: Tom Kruczek
- Principal: David Pugh
- Teaching staff: 115.8
- Grades: 9-12
- Gender: All-Boys
- Enrollment: 1,740 (2023–24)
- Student to teacher ratio: 15.0
- Language: English, French, Spanish
- Hours in school day: 8
- Campus size: 24 acre
- Campus type: Urban
- Colors: Navy Blue, White, & Red
- Athletics conference: Florida High School Athletic Association (FHSAA) 8A
- Sports: 15
- Mascot: Explorer
- Nickname: Explorers
- Team name: Columbus Explorers
- Accreditation: Southern Association of Colleges and Schools, Cognia (education)
- Publication: CCNN Live
- Newspaper: The Log
- Yearbook: Adelante
- School fees: $856 (enrollment fee)
- Tuition: $16,300 (2024-25)
- Alias: CCHS or Columbus
- Website: www.columbushs.com

Christopher Columbus High School is a private Catholic college-preparatory high school conducted by the Marist Brothers in the Westchester area of Miami-Dade County, Florida. It was established in 1958 and transferred to the Marist Brothers in 1959. The school has over 100 teachers, administrators, faculty, staff, with an enrollment of 1,700 students.

== History ==
The school was established in 1958 by the Diocese of Miami at the request of the Archbishop of Miami Coleman F. Carroll to continue the secondary education program at St. Theresa Catholic School in Coral Gables.

The school opened with two and a half buildings and an enrollment of approximately 150 students. The Marist Brothers assumed the direction of the school in 1959. Presently the Columbus campus extends over 24 acres. In addition to the four major academic buildings, there is the Abraham Science Building, the Lawrence-Bell Media Center, the Howard Korth Music and Athletic Center, and the Mas Technology Complex. Athletic facilities include varsity athletic fields, a baseball complex, outdoor basketball courts, tennis courts, a gymnasium, track, and weight room.

In May 2018, Columbus High School made national headlines after controversy centered around the display of a live caged tiger during the school's "jungle-themed" prom. Videos and images captured the tiger pacing in a metal enclosure. The school's principal David Pugh expressed regret for the school administration decision to allow the use of animal entertainment, stating that it did not reflect the school's Catholic values.

Columbus' rival school is the only other all-male, Roman Catholic school in Miami-Dade County, Belen Jesuit Preparatory School. The two schools' rivalry is often limited to athletics (though Columbus competes on the more competitive level across all sports), the rivalry often extends beyond sports and into local politics and culture.

== Academics ==
In order to graduate, students require twenty-four credits and a grade point average (GPA) of at least 2.0. They must also complete one hundred hours of community service by the end of their senior year, 80 of which must be Direct, and 20 must be indirect. The academics at Columbus are based on a phasing system: “College Preparatory” classes are for the academically challenged who require more time to absorb a given subject, “Accelerated” classes are for the average student, An “Honours Class” is for the academically gifted, and Phase 5 refers to Advanced Placement (AP) classes, which have a college-level format and where academically motivated students have the opportunity to gain college credit should they earn the proper score on the AP exam. Depending on a given phase of a class, a student will earn a certain number of points, which are then weighted and averaged to generate a student's GPA, the average GPA being a 3.2.

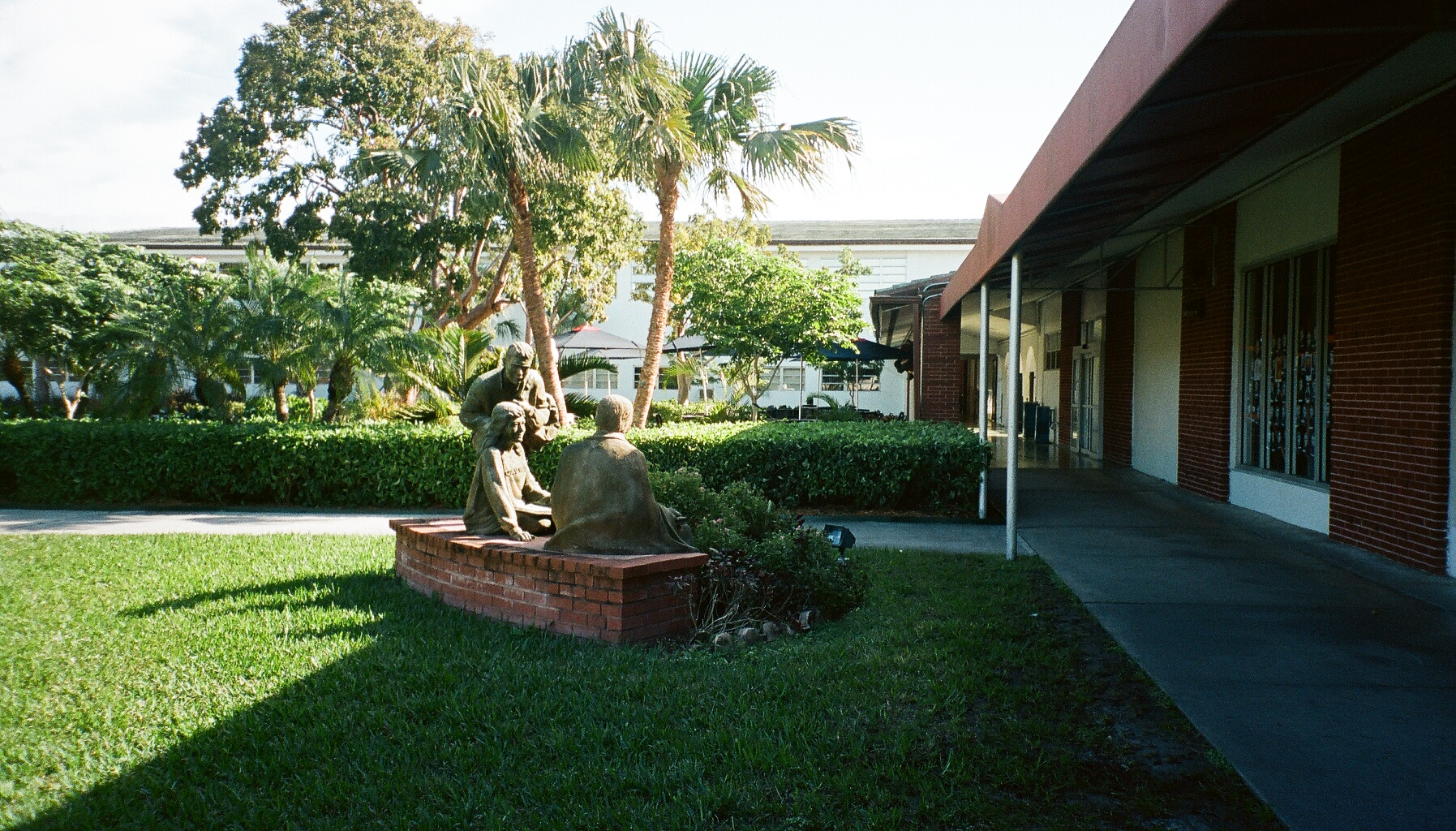
Outside of Columbus HS cafeteria.

Columbus has more students taking AP classes than any other Catholic school in Miami-Dade County and their passing averages on AP exams are five times higher than the state and national averages.

== Curriculum design ==
Dual-enrollment classes are offered through St Thomas University, Barry University and Florida International University.

== Students and faculty ==
In 2023–24 Columbus had an enrollment of approximately 1,750 students. The students are 54.4% Hispanic, 49.6% White, 2.3% African-American, and 0.9% combination of Asian/Pacific Islander and Native American/Alaskan. The student-teacher ratio at Christopher Columbus High School is about 15:1. The professional staff includes 17 Marist Brothers, 100 laypersons; 2 librarians/media specialists and 9 counselors/advisors; 45% hold an advanced degree; 60% have over 20 years of teaching experience, and half have been with the school well over 15 years. Many Marist Brothers hold positions at Columbus including president, guidance counselors, career and college advisors, and teachers.

== Clubs and social life ==
Columbus is one of the most awarded broadcast journalism programs in the country (CCNN Live). They are five time Student Television Network National Crazy 8 champions. (2015, 2016, 2019, 2023, 2025) They have also been recognized by the National Scholastic Press Association, Florida Scholastic Press Association, and National Federation of High School (NFHS). They have won 85 Suncoast Chapter of the National Academy of Television Arts & Sciences Student Production Awards (Emmys) and 15 National Academy of Television Arts & Sciences National Awards.

== Athletics ==
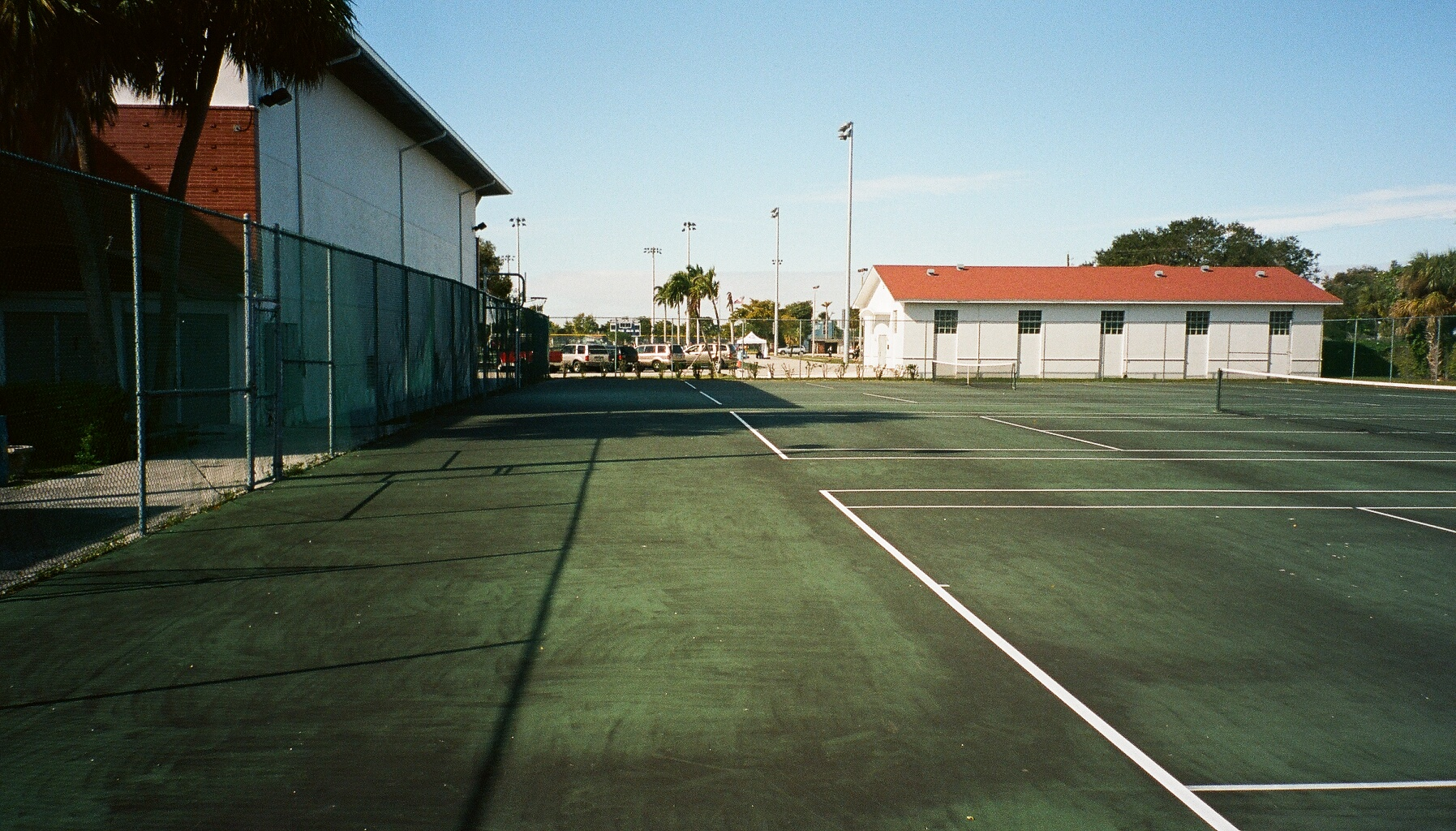
The tennis courts are adjacent to the gymnasium building, at left.

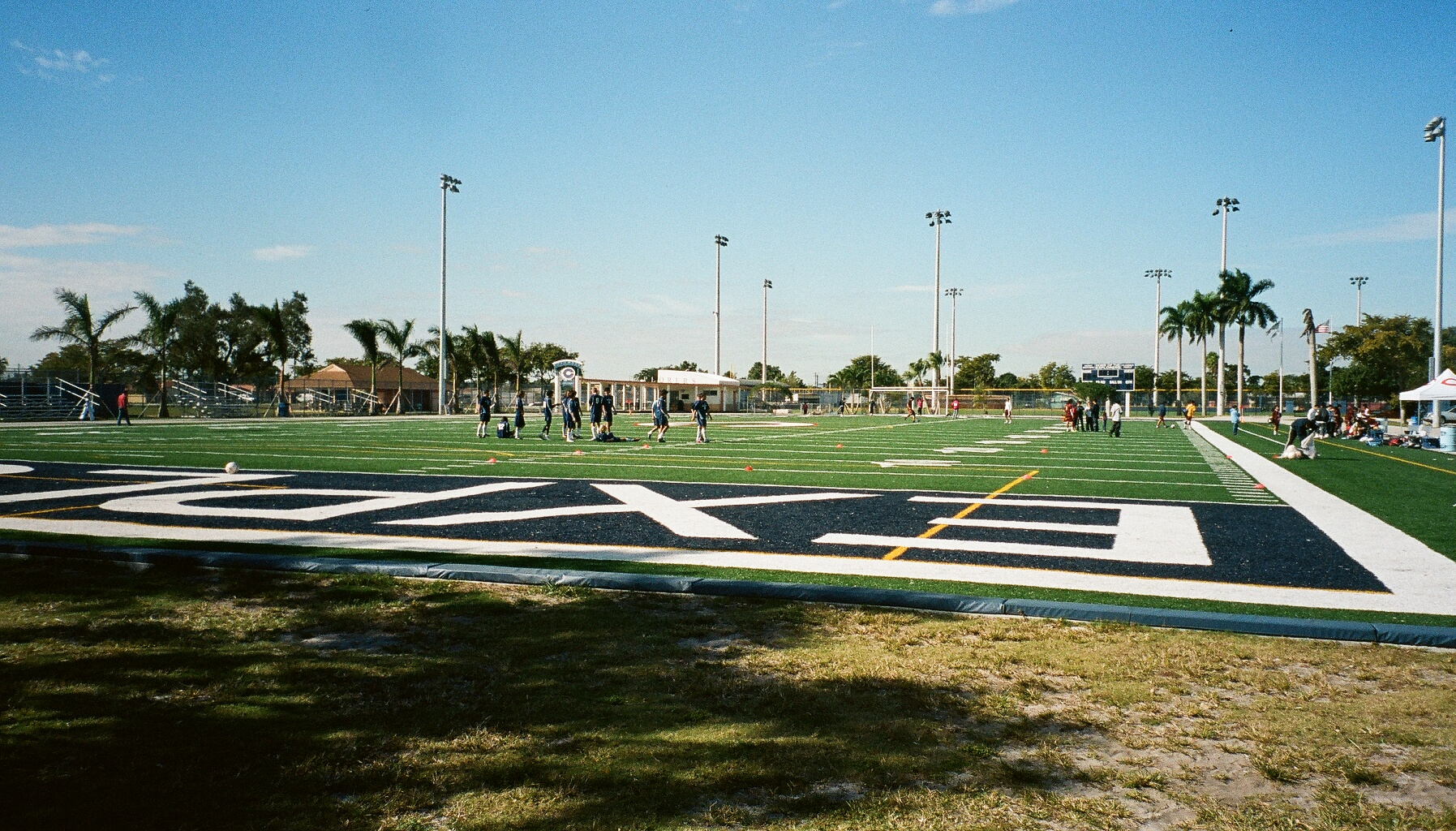
The football field is surrounded by the track and stadium seating.

A member of the Florida High School Activities Association and the Greater Miami Athletic Conference, Columbus is the only private school in the state of Florida to compete at the 8A level.

At Columbus, students also compete in non GMAC clubs such as: Roller Hockey, Fishing, Scuba Diving, and Personal Fitness. Varsity level sports offered are: baseball, basketball, football, volleyball, hockey, soccer, bowling, cross country, golf, lacrosse, swimming, diving, tennis, track and field, water polo, weightlifting, and wrestling.

Junior varsity level sports include: baseball, basketball, football, volleyball, hockey, soccer, wrestling and lacrosse. Freshman level sports offered are: baseball, basketball, football and volleyball.

In 2009, Christopher Columbus High School won the Dodge Sunshine Cup All-Sports Award for boys' athletics programs in Class 6A.

=== State Championships ===
- Baseball: 2003, 2015
- Football: 2019, 2022, 2023
- Boys cross country: 1997, 2008, 2009, 2010, 2020
- Boys tennis: 1987
- Boys track and field: 2018, 2019, 2024
- Boys soccer: 2014, 2026
- Boys basketball: 2022, 2023, 2024, 2025, 2026
- Boys Volleyball: 2026

=== National Championships ===
- Boys Basketball: 2025

Additionally, Columbus won the Miami Herald's All-Dade Boys' Major Sports Award in 2008 and 2009.

Current head football coach Dave Dunn has led the team to two straight championships and former head football coach Chris Merritt was part of Team USA's coaching staff for the International Federation of American Football Junior World Championship in 2009. One player from Columbus competed on the team, which won the tournament.

Christopher Columbus' baseball program was ranked the number one baseball team in America during the 2009-2010 year. Currently, Columbus competes at the 8A division.

== Notable alumni ==
=== Law/public service ===
- Richard Blanco - '85, U.S. inaugural poet
- Raoul G. Cantero, III - '78, Justice of Florida Supreme Court
- Carlos A. Gimenez - '72, U.S. Representative for Florida's 26th congressional district, Miami-Dade County Mayor, District 7 Commissioner, city manager and Fire Chief of Miami
- Javier Fernandez - '94, State Representative for District 114 in the Florida House of Representatives, lawyer and public servant
- Pedro José Greer - Presidential Medal of Freedom recipient
- Victor E. Renuart, Jr. - '67, Air Force general, commander of United States Northern Command and North American Aerospace Defense Command
- John D. Couriel - '96, Justice of Florida Supreme Court

=== Journalism/entertainment ===
- Patrick Farrell - '77, photojournalist and Pulitzer Prize winner
- Enrique Murciano - '91, actor, CBS drama Without a Trace and films Traffic, Speed 2: Cruise Control, The Lost City, Black Hawk Down
- John M. Higgins - '79, journalist, business editor of Broadcasting & Cable
- Carlos Maza - '06, journalist, formerly of Vox Media
- Brian Regan - '76, American stand-up comedian
- James F. O'Brien - '88, Oscar for Scientific and Technical Achievement

=== Business people ===
- Marcus Lemonis - '91, entrepreneur, television personality and CEO of Camping World
- Jorge Mas - '81, Chairman of MasTec
- Carlos A. Rodriguez - '82, CEO of Automatic Data Processing & Board member of Automatic Data Processing and Hubell Inc.

=== Athletes ===
- Eddy Alvarez - '08, 2014 Sochi Olympics Team USA member, short track speed skating; first Cuban-American male speedskater to go to Winter Olympics for USA
- Augie Diaz - '72, world-class sailor

==== Baseball ====
- Alex Rodriguez, Former MLB infielder (Seattle Mariners, Texas Rangers, New York Yankees) Did not graduate. Transferred to Westminster Christian School (Florida).
- Orestes Destrade - '80, player for Florida Marlins, New York Yankees, Pittsburgh Pirates and ESPN analyst on Baseball Tonight
- Pedro Grifol - coach for Kansas City Royals
- Jon Jay - '03, player for St. Louis Cardinals, San Diego Padres, Chicago Cubs, Chicago White Sox, Arizona Diamondbacks, and Anaheim Angels
- Ed Lynch - '73, pitcher for New York Mets and general manager for Chicago Cubs
- Paul Mainieri -'75, collegiate baseball and Baseball America's National Coach of the Year, led LSU to 2009 National Championship
- Izzy Molina - '90, player for Oakland Athletics and Baltimore Orioles
- Rob Murphy - '78, pitcher for Cincinnati Reds, Boston Red Sox, Seattle Mariners, Houston Astros, St. Louis Cardinals, New York Yankees, Los Angeles Dodgers and Florida Marlins; pitched collegiately for the University of Florida
- Andrew Suarez - '11, pitcher for the San Francisco Giants and for the Miami Hurricanes, selected in 2011 MLB draft
- Bryan Garcia - '13 - pitcher for the Detroit Tigers, and for the Miami Hurricanes, selected in the 2016 MLB draft

==== Basketball ====
- Jase Richardson - '24, Orlando Magic
- Cameron Boozer - '25, Duke Blue Devils and Memphis Grizzlies
- Cayden Boozer - '25, Duke Blue Devils

==== Football ====
- Deon Bush - '12, safety for the Kansas City Chiefs
- Mario Cristobal - '88, University of Miami 2x national champion ('89, '91), current University of Miami head coach
- Joaquin Gonzalez - '97, offensive tackle for the Cleveland Browns, Indianapolis Colts, and the University of Miami
- Brian Griese - '93, quarterback for Denver Broncos, Miami Dolphins and Chicago Bears, 1997 national champion, University of Michigan
- Xzavier Henderson - '20, Cincinnati Bearcats wide receiver
- Tyler Harrell - '18, wide receiver for the Alabama Crimson Tide
- C. J. Henderson - '17, cornerback for the Carolina Panthers
- Alonzo Highsmith - '83, running back for the University of Miami, Houston Oilers, Dallas Cowboys, and Tampa Bay Buccaneers; professional boxer; currently personnel executive for the New England Patriots.
- Carlos Huerta - '87, placekicker for Chicago Bears and the St. Louis Rams
- Patrick Lee - '03, cornerback for Auburn University and the Green Bay Packers. 2011 Super Bowl champion
- Federico Maranges - '19, center for the Florida Atlantic Owls and the Seattle Seahawks.
- Alberto Mendoza - '24, Indiana Hoosiers and Georgia Tech Yellow Jackets quarterback; 2025 national champion at Indiana
- Fernando Mendoza - '22, California Golden Bears, Indiana Hoosiers, and Las Vegas Raiders quarterback; 2025 Heisman Trophy recipient and national champion at Indiana; 1st overall pick in 2026 NFL draft to the Raiders
- Alex Mirabal - '88, University of Miami assistant head coach
- Henry Parrish Jr. - '20, Ole Miss Rebels running back
- Elijah Roberts - '20, SMU Mustangs defensive end
- Ryan Rodriguez - '21, University of Miami
- Mike Shula - '83, University of Alabama football coach, current quarterbacks coach for NFL Denver Broncos
- Josh Uche - '16, linebacker for the Philadelphia Eagles
- Mike Whittington - '76, University of Notre Dame, New York Giants and Memphis Showboats linebacker
- Bobo Wilson - '13, former NFL player
