= 2026 Georgia Tech Yellow Jackets football team =

American college football season

2026 Georgia Tech Yellow Jackets football
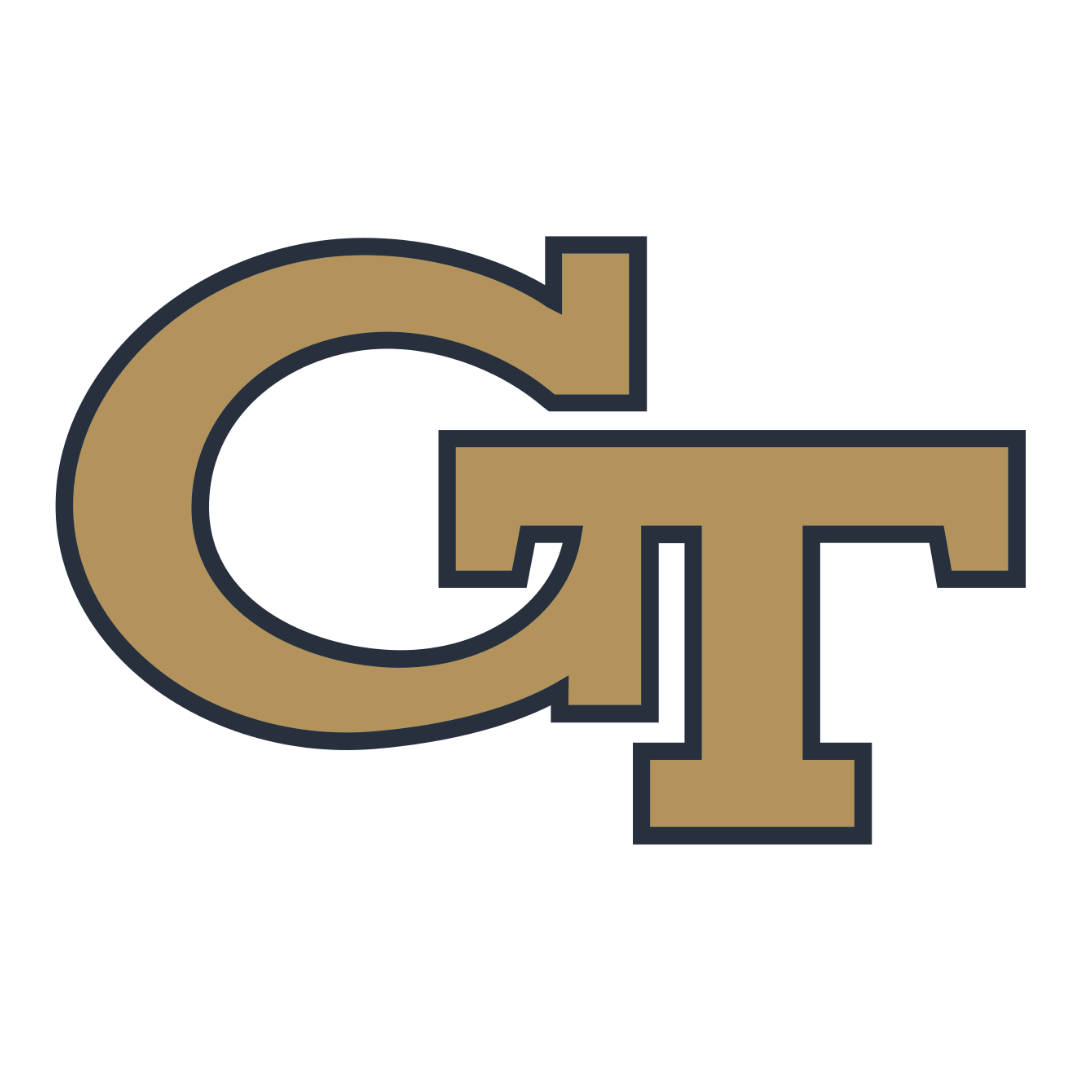
- Conference: Atlantic Coast Conference
- Record: 3–8 (2–6 ACC)
- Head coach: Brent Key (4th season)
- Offensive coordinator: George Godsey (1st season)
- Co-offensive coordinator: Chris Weinke (4th season)
- Offensive scheme: Pro spread
- Defensive coordinator: Jason Semore (1st season; first 9 games)
- Base defense: Multiple 4–2–5
- Home stadium: Bobby Dodd Stadium

Uniform
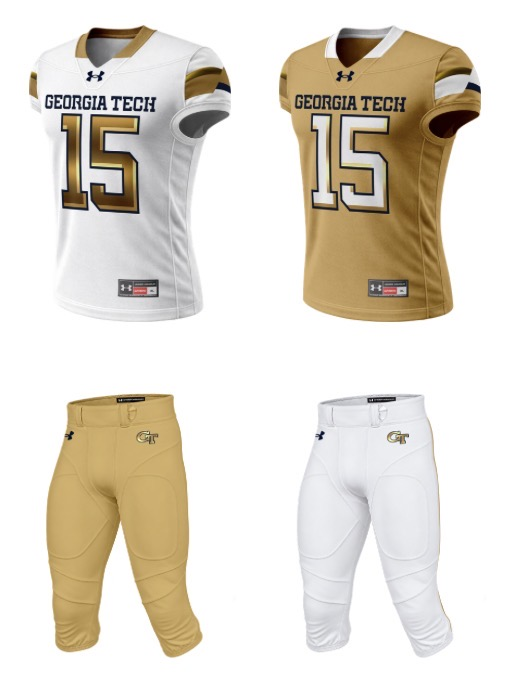

2026 Atlantic Coast Conference football standings
	Conf.			Overall
Team	W		L	W		L
No. 7 Miami (FL) y	8	–	0	10	–	1
No. 11 Wake Forest y	7	–	1	10	–	1
No. 23 Louisville	7	–	2	8	–	3
Clemson	5	–	3	7	–	4
SMU	5	–	3	7	–	4
Duke	4	–	4	7	–	4
Stanford	4	–	4	6	–	5
Virginia	4	–	4	6	–	5
Boston College	3	–	4	5	–	6
Pittsburgh	3	–	5	6	–	5
Virginia Tech	3	–	5	6	–	5
NC State	3	–	5	5	–	6
Florida State	3	–	5	5	–	6
Syracuse	3	–	6	5	–	6
North Carolina	2	–	5	5	–	6
California	2	–	6	3	–	8
Georgia Tech	2	–	6	3	–	8
Championship: Miami (FL) vs. Wake Forest
^ – College Football Playoff participant; $ – Conference champion; y – Championship game participant; As of November 22, 2026; Rankings from CFP rankings

The 2026 Georgia Tech Yellow Jackets football team represents Georgia Tech as a member of the Atlantic Coast Conference (ACC) during the 2026 NCAA Division I FBS football season. The Yellow Jackets are led by Brent Key in his fourth full season. They play their home games at Bobby Dodd Stadium located in Atlanta, Georgia.

== Offseason ==
=== 2026 NFL draft ===
Round	Pick	Player	Position	Team
1	26	Keylan Rutledge	G	Houston Texans
6	213	Jordan van den Berg	DT	Chicago Bears

=== Transfers ===
==== Incoming ====
Name	Pos.	Height	Weight	Hometown	Prev. school
Alex Bacchetta	P	6'2"	227 lbs	Atlanta, GA	Rice
Vincent Carroll-Jackson	DL	6'5"	290 lbs	Harrisburg, PA	UConn
Noah Carter	EDGE	6'4"	243 lbs	Peoria, AZ	Alabama
Chris Corbo	TE	6'5"	250 lbs	Caldwell, NJ	Dartmouth
Jonas Duclona	CB	5'11"	190 lbs	Naples, FL	South Florida
Favour Edwin	OT	6'6"	317 lbs	McDonough, GA	Auburn
Isaiah Fuhrmann	WR	6'4"	192 lbs	Suffolk, VA	Elon
Tim Griffin	DL	6'5"	275 lbs	Covington, GA	Cincinnati
Gavin Harris	TE	6'3"	240 lbs	Converse, TX	New Mexico State
Justice Haynes	RB	5'11"	210 lbs	Buford, GA	Michigan
Joseph Ionata	OL	6'5"	306 lbs	Clearwater, FL	Alabama
Cal Keeler	LS	6'2"	200 lbs	Phoenix, AZ	TCU
Jaylen Mbakwe	WR	5'11"	190 lbs	Pinson, AL	Alabama
Taje McCoy	EDGE	6'3"	245 lbs	Oklahoma City, OK	Oklahoma State
Alberto Mendoza	QB	6'2"	207 lbs	Miami, FL	Indiana
Spencer Mermans	TE	6'6"	260 lbs	Charlotte, NC	Yale
Jaiven Plummer	WR	6'3"	215 lbs	Alexandria, VA	California
Markell Samuel	OT	6'4"	305 lbs	Fayetteville, NC	Oklahoma State
Tawfiq Thomas	DL	6'4"	300 lbs	Tampa, FL	Colorado
Jordan Walker	EDGE	6'4"	268 lbs	Henrietta, NY	Rutgers

==== Outgoing ====
Name	Pos.	Height	Weight	Hometown	New school
Santana Alo-Tupuola	IOL	6'1"	325 lbs	Brownsburg, IN	Arizona State
Blake Belin	DL	6'2"	280 lbs	Bronx, NY	Unknown
Jamauri Brice	WR	5'10"	170 lbs	Cartersville, GA	UT Martin
Tah'j Butler	LB	6'2"	215 lbs	New Orleans, LA	Ole Miss
Isiah Canion	WR	6'3"	190 lbs	Warner Robins, GA	Georgia
Jamie Felix	RB	5'10"	198 lbs	Kingsland, GA	Unknown
Ben Galloway	IOL	6'4"	300 lbs	Powder Springs, GA	Florida Atlantic
Jackson Hamilton	LB	6'1"	205 lbs	Roswell, GA	Unknown
Luke Harpring	TE	6'3"	215 lbs	Atlanta, GA	Florida
Melvin Jordan	LB	5'11"	216 lbs	St. Petersburg, FL	Unknown
Peyton Joseph	IOL	6'3"	280 lbs	Fort Valley, GA	Oklahoma
Landen Marshall	DL	6'3"	285 lbs	Andalusia, AL	Unknown
DJ Moore	S	6'1"	185 lbs	Lawrenceville, GA	South Alabama
Harrison Moore	IOL	6'5	230 lbs	Southlake, TX	Florida
Aaron Philo	QB	6'1"	205 lbs	Bogart, GA	Florida
Christian Pritchett	S	6'2"	180 lbs	New Orleans, LA	Kansas
Troy Stevenson	CB	6'0"	165 lbs	Charleston, SC	Unknown
Bailey Stockton	WR	5'9"	175 lbs	Athens, GA	Florida
Joseph Stoever	LS	6'2"	210 lbs	Savannah, GA	Buffalo
Zion Taylor	WR	6'1"	185 lbs	Lilburn, GA	Western Kentucky

== Schedule ==
Date	Time	Opponent	Site	TV	Result	Attendance
September 3	8:00 p.m.	Colorado*	Bobby Dodd Stadium; Atlanta, GA	ESPN	L 13–14	52,113
September 12	7:00 p.m.	No. 18 Tennessee*	Bobby Dodd Stadium; Atlanta, GA (rivalry)	ESPN	L 24–45	52,113
September 19	12:00 p.m.	No. 23 (FCS) Mercer*	Bobby Dodd Stadium; Atlanta, GA	ACCN	W 44–11	50,852
September 26	10:30 p.m.	at Stanford	Stanford Stadium; Stanford, CA	ESPN	L 27–34	23,455
October 10	3:30 p.m.	Duke	Bobby Dodd Stadium; Atlanta, GA (rivalry)	ESPN2	W 28–25	46,432
October 17	3:30 p.m.	at Virginia Tech	Lane Stadium; Blacksburg, VA (rivalry)	ACCN	L 24–34	65,632
October 24	3:30 p.m.	Boston College^{†}	Bobby Dodd Stadium; Atlanta, GA	ACCN	L 27–49	47,239
October 31	7:30 p.m.	at Pittsburgh	Acrisure Stadium; Pittsburgh, PA	ESPN2	L 11–34	42,904
November 7	7:30 p.m.	Louisville	Bobby Dodd Stadium; Atlanta, GA	ACCN	L 17–44	44,680
November 14	12:30 p.m.	at Clemson	Memorial Stadium; Clemson, SC (rivalry)	The CW	W 20–6	76,701
November 21	12:00 p.m.	No. 11 Wake Forest	Bobby Dodd Stadium; Atlanta, GA	ESPN	L 29–50	45,296
November 28	3:30 p.m.	at Georgia*	Sanford Stadium; Athens, GA (Clean, Old-Fashioned Hate)	ABC		
*Non-conference game; ^{†}Homecoming; Rankings from AP Poll (and CFP Rankings, after November 3) – Released prior to game; All times are in Eastern time; Source:

== Game summaries ==
=== vs. Colorado ===
Colorado Buffaloes (0–0) at Georgia Tech Yellow Jackets (0–0) – Game summary

Quarter	1	2	3	4	Total
Buffaloes	0	7	0	7	14
Yellow Jackets	0	10	0	3	13

at Bobby Dodd Stadium • Atlanta, Georgia

- Date: September 3
- Game time: 8:00 p.m. EDT
- Game weather: Sunny • Temperature: 85 °F (29 °C)
- Game attendance: 52,113
- Referee: Jon Noli
- TV announcers (ESPN): Matt Barrie (play-by-play), Chase Daniel (analyst), Paul Carcaterra (sideline)

Game information

First quarter

- No scoring plays.

Second quarter

- (13:06) COLO – Micah Welch 5-yard run, Daniel Gerlach kick (Drive: 5 plays, 35 yards, 1:45; Colorado 7–0)
- (12:52) GT – Rahkeem Smith 100-yard kickoff return, Aidan Birr kick (Tied 7–7)
- (2:03) GT – Aidan Birr 22-yard field goal (Drive: 12 plays, 92 yards, 5:35; Georgia Tech 10–7)

Third quarter

- No scoring plays.

Fourth quarter

- (1:40) GT – Aidan Birr 29-yard field goal (Drive: 13 plays, 68 yards, 5:55; Georgia Tech 13–7)
- (0:37) COLO – Charlie Williams 20-yard pass from Julian Lewis, Daniel Gerlach kick (Drive: 8 plays, 75 yards, 1:03; Colorado 14–13)

Statistics	COLO	GT
First downs	21	17
Plays–yards	76–307	54–288
Rushes–yards	49–183	30–51
Passing yards	124	237
Passing: comp–att–int	14–27–0	17–24–0
Turnovers	0	1
Time of possession	34:09	25:51

Team	Category	Player	Statistics
Colorado	Passing	Julian Lewis	14/27, 124 yards, TD
Colorado	Rushing	Damian Henderson II	12 carries, 65 yards
Colorado	Receiving	DeAndre Moore Jr.	4 receptions, 37 yards
Georgia Tech	Passing	Alberto Mendoza	17/23, 237 yards
Georgia Tech	Rushing	Justice Haynes	19 carries, 64 yards
Georgia Tech	Receiving	Jordan Allen	8 receptions, 113 yards

=== vs. No. 18 Tennessee (rivalry) ===
No. 18 Tennessee Volunteers (1–0) at Georgia Tech Yellow Jackets (0–1) – Game summary

Quarter	1	2	3	4	Total
No. 18 Volunteers	7	17	7	14	45
Yellow Jackets	10	0	7	7	24

at Bobby Dodd Stadium • Atlanta, GA

- Date: September 12
- Game time: 7:00 p.m. EDT
- Game weather: Clear • Temperature: 80 °F (27 °C) • Wind: NE 4 mph
- Game attendance: 52,113
- Referee: Justin Elliot
- TV announcers (ESPN): Bob Wischusen, Louis Riddick and Stormy Buonantony

Game information

First quarter

- TENN – Ethan Davis 25-yard pass from Faizon Brandon (Cooper Ranvier kick), 12:22. Volunteers 7–0. Drive: 3 plays, 63 yards, 1:19.
- GT – Aidan Birr 30-yard field goal, 6:33. Volunteers 7–3. Drive: 14 plays, 63 yards, 5:49.
- GT – Elijah Sessions 3-yard blocked punt return (Aidan Birr kick), 5:49. Yellow Jackets 10–7.

Second quarter

- TENN – Cooper Ranvier 32-yard field goal, 14:01. Tied 10–10. Drive: 14 plays, 61 yards, 6:48.
- TENN – Dejuan Lane 41-yard interception return (Cooper Ranvier kick), 11:24. Volunteers 17–10.
- TENN – Braylon Staley 20-yard pass from Faizon Brandon (Cooper Ranvier kick), 4:21. Volunteers 24–10. Drive: 6 plays, 55 yards, 1:46.

Third quarter

- TENN – DeSean Bishop 17-yard run (Cooper Ranvier kick), 11:41. Volunteers 31–10. Drive: 8 plays, 75 yards, 3:19.
- GT – Justice Haynes 2-yard pass from Alberto Mendoza (Aidan Birr kick), 7:10. Volunteers 31–17. Drive: 9 plays, 75 yards, 4:31.

Fourth quarter

- TENN – DeSean Bishop 29-yard run (Cooper Ranvier kick), 4:25. Volunteers 38–17. Drive: 3 plays, 23 yards, 0:18.
- GT – Justice Haynes 2-yard run (Aidan Birr kick), 1:39. Volunteers 38–24. Drive: 8 plays, 75 yards, 2:46.
- TENN – Daune Morris 47-yard run (Cooper Ranvier kick), 1:30. Volunteers 45–24. Drive: 1 play, 47 yards, 0:08.

Statistics	TENN	GT
First downs	24	25
Plays–yards	66–447	71–356
Rushes–yards	45–299	31–135
Passing yards	148	221
Passing: comp–att–int	10–21–0	26–40–2
Turnovers	0	2
Time of possession	28:48	31:12

Team	Category	Player	Statistics
Tennessee	Passing	Faizon Brandon	10/21, 148 yards, 2 TD
Tennessee	Rushing	DeSean Bishop	20 carries, 147 yards, 2 TD
Tennessee	Receiving	Radarious Jackson	3 receptions, 64 yards
Georgia Tech	Passing	Alberto Mendoza	26/40, 221 yards, TD, 2 INT
Georgia Tech	Rushing	Justice Haynes	14 carries, 81 yards, TD
Georgia Tech	Receiving	Kevin Roche Jr.	6 receptions, 66 yards

=== vs. No. 23 (FCS) Mercer ===
Mercer was ranked No. 23 in the D-I Football Championship Subdivision coming into the game. Tech defeated Mercer 44–11.

No. 23 (FCS) Mercer Bears (2–1) at Georgia Tech Yellow Jackets (0–2) – Game summary

Quarter	1	2	3	4	Total
No. 23 (FCS) Bears	0	3	8	0	11
Yellow Jackets	7	17	13	7	44

at Bobby Dodd Stadium • Atlanta, GA

- Date: September 19
- Game time: 12:00 p.m. EDT
- TV announcers (ACCN): Jorge Sedano, Rodney McLeod and Kendra Douglas

Statistics	MER	GT
First downs	15	20
Plays–yards	60–290	62–405
Rushes–yards	46–188	40–156
Passing yards	102	249
Passing: comp–att–int	10–14–1	15–22–0
Time of possession	32:42	27:18

Team	Category	Player	Statistics
Mercer	Passing	JP Pickles	7/11, 82 yards, INT
Mercer	Rushing	Zahmari Palode-Gary	15 carries, 71 yards
Mercer	Receiving	Brayden Smith	4 receptions, 58 yards
Georgia Tech	Passing	Alberto Mendoza	15/21, 249 yards, 3 TD
Georgia Tech	Rushing	Justice Haynes	22 carries, 141 yards, 2 TD
Georgia Tech	Receiving	Dalen Penson	3 receptions, 58 yards

=== at Stanford ===
Georgia Tech Yellow Jackets (1–2) at Stanford Cardinal (1–2) – Game summary

Quarter	1	2	3	4	Total
Yellow Jackets	0	0	0	0	0
Cardinal	0	0	0	0	0

at Stanford Stadium • Stanford, CA

- Date: September 26
- Game time: 10:30 p.m. EDT
- TV announcers (ESPN): Roy Philpott, Brock Osweiler and Sherree Burruss

Statistics	GT	STAN
First downs		
Plays–yards		
Rushes–yards		
Passing yards		
Passing: comp–att–int		
Time of possession		

Team	Category	Player	Statistics
Georgia Tech	Passing		
Georgia Tech	Rushing		
Georgia Tech	Receiving		
Stanford	Passing		
Stanford	Rushing		
Stanford	Receiving		

=== vs. Duke ===
Duke Blue Devils (4–0) at Georgia Tech Yellow Jackets (1–3) – Game summary

Quarter	1	2	3	4	Total
Blue Devils	0	10	8	7	25
Yellow Jackets	7	7	7	7	28

at Bobby Dodd Stadium • Atlanta, GA

- Date: October 10
- Game time: 3:30 p.m. EDT
- Game attendance: 46,432

Statistics	DUKE	GT
First downs	28	21
Plays–yards	77–418	57–383
Rushes–yards	35–159	27–165
Passing yards	259	218
Passing: comp–att–int	26–42–0	23–30–0
Time of possession	35:26	24:34

Team	Category	Player	Statistics
Duke	Passing	Walker Eget	26/41, 259 yards, TD
Duke	Rushing	Nate Sheppard	27 carries, 99 yards, 2 TD
Duke	Receiving	Nate Sheppard	7 receptions, 91 yards
Georgia Tech	Passing	Alberto Mendoza	23/30, 218 yards, TD
Georgia Tech	Rushing	Trelain Maddox	10 carries, 81 yards, 3 TD
Georgia Tech	Receiving	Jordan Allen	10 receptions, 99 yards, TD

=== at Virginia Tech (rivalry) ===
Georgia Tech Yellow Jackets (2–3) at Virginia Tech Hokies (4–2) – Game summary

Quarter	1	2	3	4	Total
Yellow Jackets	0	3	14	7	24
Hokies	14	10	7	3	34

at Lane Stadium • Blacksburg, VA

- Date: October 17
- Game time: 3:30 p.m. EDT
- Game weather: Cloudy • Temperature: 54 °F (12 °C) • Wind: N at 4 miles per hour (6.4 km/h)
- Game attendance: 65,632
- Referee: Justin Elliott
- TV announcers (ACC Network): Wes Durham (play-by-play), Max Browne (analyst), and Madison Fitzpatrick (sideline)

Statistics	GT	VT
First downs	21	19
Plays–yards	59–428	62–409
Rushes–yards	21–93	40–159
Passing yards	335	250
Passing: comp–att–int	29–38–1	15–22–0
Turnovers	2	1
Time of possession	27:54	32:06

Team	Category	Player	Statistics
Georgia Tech	Passing	Alberto Mendoza	29/38, 335 yards, 2 TD, INT
Georgia Tech	Rushing	Trelain Maddox	12 carries, 96 yards, TD
Georgia Tech	Receiving	Jordan Allen	10 receptions, 120 yards
Virginia Tech	Passing	Ethan Grunkemeyer	15/22, 250 yards, 3 TD
Virginia Tech	Rushing	Jeffrey Overton Jr.	14 carries, 85 yards
Virginia Tech	Receiving	Que'Sean Brown	6 receptions, 182 yards, TD

=== vs. Boston College ===
Boston College Eagles (3–3) at Georgia Tech Yellow Jackets (2–4) – Game summary

Quarter	1	2	3	4	Total
Eagles	0	0	0	0	0
Yellow Jackets	0	0	0	0	0

at Bobby Dodd Stadium • Atlanta, GA

- Date: October 24
- Game time: TBD

Statistics	BC	GT
First downs		
Plays–yards		
Rushes–yards		
Passing yards		
Passing: comp–att–int		
Time of possession		

Team	Category	Player	Statistics
Boston College	Passing		
Boston College	Rushing		
Boston College	Receiving		
Georgia Tech	Passing		
Georgia Tech	Rushing		
Georgia Tech	Receiving		

=== at Pittsburgh ===
Georgia Tech Yellow Jackets (2–5) at Pittsburgh Panthers (5–3) – Game summary

Quarter	1	2	3	4	Total
Yellow Jackets	0	0	0	0	0
Panthers	0	0	0	0	0

at Acrisure Stadium • Pittsburgh, PA

- Date: October 31
- Game time: TBD

Statistics	GT	PITT
First downs		
Plays–yards		
Rushes–yards		
Passing yards		
Passing: comp–att–int		
Time of possession		

Team	Category	Player	Statistics
Georgia Tech	Passing		
Georgia Tech	Rushing		
Georgia Tech	Receiving		
Pittsburgh	Passing		
Pittsburgh	Rushing		
Pittsburgh	Receiving		

=== vs. Louisville ===
Louisville Cardinals (5–3) at Georgia Tech Yellow Jackets (2–6) – Game summary

Quarter	1	2	3	4	Total
Cardinals	10	17	10	7	44
Yellow Jackets	3	7	0	7	17

at Bobby Dodd Stadium • Atlanta, Georgia

- Date: November 7
- Game time: 7:30 p.m. EST
- Game weather: Sunny • Temperature: 56 °F (13 °C)
- Game attendance: 44,680
- Referee: Jerry Magallanes
- TV announcers (ACCN): Wes Durham, Max Browne, and Madison Fitzpatrick

Game information

First quarter

- (11:06) LOU – Carson Hilbert 42-yard field goal (Drive: 8 plays, 50 yards, 3:54; Louisville 3–0)
- (6:19) GT – Aiden Birr 32-yard field goal (Drive: 9 plays, 40 yards, 2:49; Tied 3–3)
- (3:26) LOU – Tre Richardson 8-yard pass from Lincoln Kienholz (Carson Hilbert kick) (Drive: 5 plays, 75 yards, 2:53; Louisville 10–3)

Second quarter

- (12:31) LOU – TreyShun Hurry 4-yard pass from Lincoln Kienholz (Carson Hilbert kick) (Drive: 8 plays, 64 yards, 4:18; Louisville 17–3)
- (10:00) LOU – Tre Richardson 52-yard run (Carson Hilbert kick) (Drive: 3 plays, 69 yards, 1:21; Louisville 24–3)
- (0:56) LOU – Carson Hilbert 23-yard field goal (Drive: 13 plays, 68 yards, 4:02; Louisville 27–3)
- (0:10) GT – Isaiah Fuhrmann 10-yard pass from Alberto Mendoza (Aiden Birr kick) (Drive: 7 plays, 75 yards, 0:46; Louisville 27–10)

Third quarter

- (7:17) LOU – Carson Hilbert 29-yard field goal (Drive: 9 plays, 44 yards, 4:40; Louisville 30–10)
- (5:42) LOU – Isaac Brown 11-yard run (Carson Hilbert kick) (Drive: 2 plays, 19 yards, 0:28; Louisville 37–10)

Fourth quarter

- (4:15) GT – Chris Corbo 11-yard pass from Grady Adamson (Aiden Birr kick) (Drive: 9 plays, 98 yards, 2:58; Louisville 37–17)
- (1:56) LOU – Braxton Jennings 2-yard run (Carson Hilbert kick) (Drive: 6 plays, 43 yards, 2:18; Louisville 44–17)

Statistics	LOU	GT
First downs	22	23
Total yards	456	350
Rushes–yards	36–251	32–109
Passing yards	205	241
Passing: comp–att–int	18–26–0	25–45–1
Turnovers	1	1
Time of possession	30:15	29:45

Team	Category	Player	Statistics
Louisville	Passing	Lincoln Kienholz	17–25, 182 yards, 2 TD
Louisville	Rushing	Lincoln Kienholz	9 carries, 81 yards
Louisville	Receiving	TreyShun Hurry	8 receptions, 104 yards, TD
Georgia Tech	Passing	Alberto Mendoza	13–25, 148 yards, TD
Georgia Tech	Rushing	Justice Haynes	12 carries, 87 yards
Georgia Tech	Receiving	Dalen Penson	5 receptions, 66 yards

=== at Clemson (rivalry) ===
Georgia Tech Yellow Jackets (2–7) at Clemson Tigers (6–3) – Game summary

Quarter	1	2	3	4	Total
Yellow Jackets	0	0	0	0	0
Tigers	0	0	0	0	0

at Memorial Stadium • Clemson, SC

- Date: November 14
- Game time: TBD
- TV announcers (The CW): Thom Brennaman, Jason Cabinda, and Wes Bryant

Statistics	GT	CLEM
First downs		
Plays–yards		
Rushes–yards		
Passing yards		
Passing: comp–att–int		
Time of possession		

Team	Category	Player	Statistics
Georgia Tech	Passing		
Georgia Tech	Rushing		
Georgia Tech	Receiving		
Clemson	Passing		
Clemson	Rushing		
Clemson	Receiving		

=== vs. No. 11 Wake Forest ===
No. 11 Wake Forest Demon Deacons (9–1) at Georgia Tech Yellow Jackets (3–7) – Game summary

Quarter	1	2	3	4	Total
No. 11 Demon Deacons	0	0	0	0	0
Yellow Jackets	0	0	0	0	0

at Bobby Dodd Stadium • Atlanta, GA

- Date: November 21
- Game time: TBD
- TV announcers (ESPN): Joe Tessitore, Jesse Palmer, and Kris Budden

Statistics	WAKE	GT
First downs		
Plays–yards		
Rushes–yards		
Passing yards		
Passing: comp–att–int		
Time of possession		

Team	Category	Player	Statistics
Wake Forest	Passing		
Wake Forest	Rushing		
Wake Forest	Receiving		
Georgia Tech	Passing		
Georgia Tech	Rushing		
Georgia Tech	Receiving		

=== at Georgia (Clean, Old-Fashioned Hate) ===
Georgia Tech Yellow Jackets (3–8) at Georgia Bulldogs (10–1) – Game summary

Quarter	1	2	3	4	Total
Yellow Jackets	0	0	0	0	0
Bulldogs	0	0	0	0	0

at Sanford Stadium • Athens, GA

- Date: November 28
- Game time: 3:30 p.m.

Statistics	GT	UGA
First downs		
Plays–yards		
Rushes–yards		
Passing yards		
Passing: comp–att–int		
Time of possession		

Team	Category	Player	Statistics
Georgia Tech	Passing		
Georgia Tech	Rushing		
Georgia Tech	Receiving		
Georgia	Passing		
Georgia	Rushing		
Georgia	Receiving		

== Roster ==
2026 Georgia Tech Yellow Jackets football team roster
Players
Coaches
Offense

Pos.	#	Name	Class
RB	0	Malachi Hosley	Sr
RB	2	Trelain Maddox	RSo
WR	4	Jordan Allen	So
WR	6	Debron Gatling	RSo
WR	7	Rahkeem Smith	RSr
TE	8	Gavin Harris	RSr
QB	9	Grady Adamson	Fr
WR	11	Darnell Collins	Fr
QB	12	Cole Bergeron	Fr
WR	13	Isaiah Fuhrmann	Jr
WR	14	Dalen Penson	So
QB	14	Graham Knowles	RSo
QB	15	Alberto Mendoza	RSo
WR	16	Jaiven Plummer	RSr
TE	17	Chris Corbo	RSr
QB	18	Ben Guthrie	RJr
RB	20	J.P. Powell	So
RB	22	Justice Haynes	Sr
RB	24	Shane Marshall	So
RB	27	Chad Alexander	RJr
WR	37	Joseph Moseley	RSo
WR	38	Wills Campbell	Fr
TE	39	Jack Richerson	Fr
TE	44	Spencer Mermans	RJr
TE	47	Rocco Xerogeanes	Fr
OL	52	Kevin Peay Jr.	Fr
OL	55	Xavier Canales	Fr
OL	56	Jacob Benjamin	RJr
OL	58	Jimmy Bryson	Fr
OL	62	Courtlin Heard	Fr
OL	65	Courtney Heard	Fr
OL	66	Will Reed	RSr
OL	68	Eli Rickell	Fr
OL	69	Joseph Ionata	RSo
OL	70	Jameson Riggs	RSo
OL	71	Markell Samuel	RSr
OL	72	Malachi Carney	RSr
OL	73	Favour Edwin	RSo
OL	75	Andrew Rosinski	RSo
OL	76	Krew Moledor	Fr
OL	77	Josh Petty	So
OL	78	Ethan Mackenny	RJr
OL	79	Jordan Floyd	RSo
TE	80	Connor Roush	Fr
WR	81	Cal Faulkner	Fr
WR	82	Kentrell Davis	Fr
TE	83	Blake Ragsdale	RSo
WR	84	Evan Haynes	Fr
WR	85	J.J. Winston	Fr
TE	86	Kevin Roche Jr.	Fr
WR	87	Coi Jean-Noel	Fr
WR	87	Isaac Obrokta	Fr
TE	88	Nate Agyemang	Fr
WR	89	Chris Elko	RJr

Defense

Pos.	#	Name	Class
LB	1	Cayman Spaulding	Sr
LB	2	E. J. Lightsey	RSr
CB	3	Jaylen Mbakwe	Jr
CB	4	Daiquan White	Sr
CB	5	Zachary Tobe	Sr
DE	8	Jordan Boyd	Jr
DE	9	Amontrae Bradford	Jr
DE	10	Jordan Walker	RSr
DE	11	Brayden Manley	Sr
CB	12	Jon Mitchell	RSo
S	13	Savion Riley	RSr
CB	16	Kelvin Hill	Jr
S	17	Kealan Jones	Fr
CB	20	Jaedyn Terry	Fr
CB	23	Trae Stevenson Jr.	Fr
DE	24	Noah Carter	RSo
CB	25	L. J. Crumity	Fr
S	26	Alex Hunt	Fr
S	26	Chris Hewitt Jr.	Fr
S	27	Tae Harris	So
CB	28	Elgin Sessions	So
CB	29	Jonas Duclona	RJr
LB	30	Lawson Pritchett	RSo
S	31	Felix Fenton	Fr
S	32	Jayden Barr	Fr
LB	33	C.J. Gamble	Fr
LB	34	Myles Forristall	RJr
LB	35	Braylon Outlaw	Fr
LB	36	Kymani Morales	Fr
S	39	Will Kiker	RJr
DE	40	Jordan Woods	Fr
DE	41	Taje McCoy	RJr
DE	42	Lex Willis	Fr
LB	44	Kyle Efford	RSr
LB	45	Melvin Jordan IV	RSr
DE	49	Chuma Okoye	RJr
DT	55	Christian Garrett	Fr
DT	56	Tim Griffin	Fr
DE	88	A.J. Hoffler	Sr
DT	90	Blake Belin	Fr
DE	91	Andre Fuller Jr.	So
DT	92	Christian Speakman	Fr
DE	93	Drew Cohen	RSo
DT	94	Derry Norris Jr.	Fr
DT	95	Tawfiq Thomas	RSr
DT	96	Shymeik Jones	RSo
DT	97	Landen Marshall	Fr
DT	98	Amier Clarke	Fr
DT	99	Vincent Carroll-Jackson	RJr

Special teams

Pos.	#	Name	Class
K	33	Aidan Birr	RSr
P	40	Joshua Taylor	RJr
K	41	Landon Shaffer	Fr
P	46	Jonathan Genty	Fr
P	47	Alex Bacchetta	RSr
LS	48	Cal Keeler	RSo
LS	49	Ronnie Thomas	RSr

Head coach

- Brent Key

Coordinators/assistant coaches

- George Godsey – Offensive coordinator
- Tim Salem – Special teams coordinator
- Chris Weinke – Assistant head coach, co-offensive coordinator, quarterbacks
- Jess Simpson – Assistant head coach, defensive line
- Jimmy Smith – Running backs
- Nathan Brock – Tight ends
- Vinnie Sunseri – Defensive backs
- Kobie Jones – Cornerbacks
- Mike Judge – Senior offensive analyst
- Brandon Torrey – Assistant offensive line
- Robbie Bell – Offensive quality control
- Brody Rhodes – Offensive quality control
- Jack Tyler – Senior defensive assistant
- Ayinde Eley – Defensive quality control
- Herbert Gamboa – Defensive quality control
- Jason Moore – Defensive quality control
- Brendan Farrell – Special Teams, Game Management
- John Morrison – Special teams quality control

Legend

- (C) Team captain
- (S) Suspended
- (I) Ineligible
- Injured
- Redshirt

Roster
Last update: 9 November 2026
