= 2026 Colorado Buffaloes football team =

American college football season

2026 Colorado Buffaloes football
- Conference: Big 12 Conference
- Record: 4–7 (2–6 Big 12)
- Head coach: Deion Sanders (4th season)
- Offensive coordinator: Brennan Marion (1st season)
- Offensive scheme: Go-Go
- Defensive coordinator: Chris Marve (1st season)
- Base defense: 4–3
- Home stadium: Folsom Field

Uniform

2026 Big 12 Conference football standings
	Conf.			Overall
Team	W		L	W		L
No. 2 Utah	7	–	0	10	–	0
No. 12 Texas Tech	6	–	1	9	–	1
No. 10 BYU	6	–	2	9	–	2
No. 19 Arizona	4	–	3	7	–	3
No. 20 Houston	4	–	3	7	–	3
Oklahoma State	4	–	3	6	–	4
Arizona State	4	–	3	6	–	4
Baylor	4	–	3	6	–	4
UCF	4	–	4	6	–	5
TCU	3	–	4	5	–	5
Iowa State	3	–	5	5	–	6
Cincinnati	3	–	5	6	–	5
West Virginia	2	–	5	5	–	5
Colorado	2	–	6	4	–	7
Kansas	2	–	6	4	–	7
Kansas State	1	–	6	4	–	6
Championship: December 4, 2026
^ – College Football Playoff participant; $ – Conference champion; y – Championship game participant; As of November 21, 2026; Rankings from CFP rankings

The 2026 Colorado Buffaloes football team represents the University of Colorado Boulder as a member of the Big 12 Conference during the 2026 NCAA Division I FBS football season. The Buffaloes are led by fourth-year head coach Deion Sanders. They play their home games on campus at Folsom Field in Boulder, Colorado.

== Offseason ==
=== Departures ===
==== Outgoing transfers ====
Name	No.	Pos.	Height	Weight	Year	Hometown	New school
Teon Parks	3	CB	6'1"	180	Jr	Detroit, MI	TCU
Omarion Miller	4	WR	6'2"	210	Jr	Vivian, LA	ASU
Terrance Love	6	S	6'2"	210	Jr	Atlanta, GA	Mississippi State
Dre'Lon Miller	6	WR	6'1"	200	So	Silsbee, TX	Baylor
Tawfiq Byard	7	S	6'1"	195	So	Hyattsville, MD	Texas A&M
Dallan Hayden	7	RB	5'10"	205	Jr	Memphis, TN	Memphis
DJ McKinney	8	CB	6'2"	180	Jr	Colleyville, TX	Notre Dame
Tyrecus Davis	9	CB	5'10"	190	GS	Greenville, TX	
John Slaughter	13	S	6'2"	200	So	Clarksdale, MS	Purdue
Colton Allen	14	QB	6'3"	210	Jr	Highlands Ranch, CO	
Ryan Staub	16	QB	6'1"	200	So	Stevenson Ranch, CA	Tennessee
Isaiah Hardge	17	WR	5'10"	165	So	Hollywood, FL	Tennessee
Kam Mikell	18	WR	6'1"	195	Fr	Statesboro, GA	Georgia Southern
Alexander Stoyanovich	18	K	5'9"	180	Fr	South Lyon, MI	Eastern Michigan
Noah King	20	CB	6'2"	200	Fr	Hamilton, OH	Sacramento State
TJ Branch	22	S	6'3"	170	Fr	Miami, FL	UCF
Carter Stoutmire	23	S	5'11"	210	Jr	Plano, TX	Arkansas
Kyle Carpenter	25	CB	6'3"	200	Fr	Buford, GA	North Carolina A&T
Simeon Price	26	RB	6'0"	215	Sr	Pensacola, FL	Oregon
Braden Keith	30	CB	5'10"	180	Jr	Broomfield, CO	Colorado Mines
Nathanial Watson	36	S	5'10"	180	So	Littleton, CO	Wyoming
Mantrez Walker	38	LB	6'1"	230	Fr	Buford, GA	UAB
Shaun Myers	40	LB	6'1"	220	GS	Dayton, OH	UAB
London Merritt	44	DE	6'3"	250	Fr	Atlanta, GA	Clemson
Tyler Brown	46	OG	6'3"	325	Sr	Jackson, MS	James Madison
Nikhil Webb Walker	58	DE	6'6"	275	Jr	Trelawny, JM	NAU
Carde Smith	65	OL	6'5"	300	Fr	Mobile, AL	Memphis
Cooper Lovelace	70	OL	6'5"	315	GS	Prairie Village, KS	Baylor
Walker Andersen	73	OL	6'8"	340	Rs-Fr	Placentia, CA	
Jordan Seaton	77	OT	6'5"	330	So	Washington, D.C.	LSU
Terrell Timmons Jr.	82	WR	6'2"	185	Sr	Greensboro, NC	Memphis
Brady Kopetz	86	TE	6'4"	270	Jr	Portland, OR	Withdrew/remained at Colorado
Brandon Davis-Swain	91	DE	6'4"	290	Fr	Detroit, MI	Texas A&M
Samuel Okunlola	93	DE	6'4"	250	Jr	Brockton, MA	Virginia Tech
Tavian Coleman	94	DT	6'1"	300	GS	Humble, TX	
Tawfiq Thomas	95	DT	6'4"	300	Sr	Tampa, FL	Georgia Tech
Jaheim Oatis	96	DT	6'5"	325	Jr	Columbia, MS	Ole Miss
Christian Hudson	97	DT	6'1"	300	Fr	Daytona Beach, FL	Boston College
Alexander McPherson	98	DE	6'6"	240	Fr	Stuart, FL	Penn State
Gavriel Lightfoot	99	DT	6'3"	310	Sr	Moreno Valley, CA	San Diego State

==== Coaching departures ====
Name	Previous Position	New Position
Brett Bartolone	Colorado - Offensive pass game coordinator/tight ends	Nevada - Offensive coordinator
Marshall Faulk	Colorado - Assistant head coach/running backs	Southern - Head coach
Robert Livingston	Colorado - Defensive coordinator/safeties	Denver Broncos - Defensive pass game coordinator
Domata Peko	Colorado - Defensive line	Pittsburgh Steelers - Defensive line
Michael Pollock	Colorado - Special teams coordinator	None
Warren Sapp	Colorado - Defensive pass rush coordinator	None
Pat Shurmur	Colorado - Offensive coordinator/quarterbacks	None

=== Acquisitions ===
==== Incoming transfers ====
Name	No.	Pos.	Height	Weight	Year	Hometown	Prev. school
DeAndre Moore Jr.	3	WR	6'0"	190	Sr	Bellflower, CA	Texas
Ernest Campbell	4	WR	5'9"	145	So	Refugio, TX	Sacramento State
Naeten Mitchell	4	DB	5'10"	175	Jr	Temple, TX	New Mexico State
Boo Carter	6	DB	5'11"	200	Jr	Chattanooga, TN	Tennessee
Randon Fontenette	7	DB	6'2"	220	Sr	Freeport, TX	Vanderbilt
Kam Perry	7	WR	5'9"	170	Sr	Marietta, GA	Miami (OH)
Emory Floyd	8	DB	6'1"	195	Sr	Powder Springs, GA	Appalachian State
Jaydan Hardy	9	DB	5'10	180	Fr	Lewisville, TX	Oklahoma
Richard Young	9	RB	5'11"	210	Jr	Lehigh Acres, FL	Alabama
Jason Stokes Jr.	13	DB	6'2"	185	So	Pflugerville, TX	Utah
Jah Jah Boyd	15	DB	5'11"	190	So	Philadelphia, PA	Indiana
Isaac Wilson	16	QB	6'0"	210	So	Draper, UT	Utah
Liona Lefau	17	LB	6'1"	230	Sr	Kahuka, HA	Texas
Paul Omodia	18	DB	6'2"	200	Jr	Richmond, TX	Lamar
Danny Scudero	18	WR	5'9"	175	Sr	San Jose, CA	San Jose State
Cree Thomas	20	DB	6'1"	190	Fr	Phoenix, AZ	Notre Dame
JaQuail Smith	23	RB	5'11"	170	So	Orlando, FL	Sacramento State
Damian Henderson II	26	RB	6'2"	205	Jr	Los Alamitos, CA	Sacramento State
Justin Eaglin	30	DB	6'1"	175	Sr	Fayetteville, NC	James Madison
Tyler Martinez	35	LB	6'1"	220	Fr	Albuquerque, NM	New Mexico State
Gideon Lampron	44	LB	6'0"	220	Sr	LaGrange, OH	Bowling Green
Vili Taufatofua	45	DL	6'3"	260	Sr	Auckland, NZ	San Jose State
Immanuel Ezeogu	52	DE	6'2"	240	So	Suffolk, VA	James Madison
Toby Anene	53	DE	6'4"	260	Sr	St. Paul, MN	North Dakota State
Taj White	54	OL	6'5"	310	Sr	Jersey City, NJ	Rutgers
Bo Hughley	55	OL	6'7"	295	Jr	Fairburn, GA	Georgia
Lamont Lester Jr.	56	DL	6'2"	230	So	Ramsey, NJ	Monmouth
Leon Bell	57	OL	6'8"	330	GS	Dickinson, TX	Cal
Demetrius Hunter	58	OL	6'2"	310	GS	Orange, TX	Houston
Josh McCormick	60	K	6'0"	220	GS	Austin, TX	Grambling State
Sean Kinney	62	OL	6'2"	305	Jr	Nazareth, PA	Lafayette
Jayvon McFadden	71	OL	6'3"	295	Fr	Upper Marlboro, MD	Ohio State
Jose Soto	73	OL	6'3"	310	Jr	Tulare, CA	Sacramento State
Jayven Richardson	75	OL	6'6"	315	Sr	Gonzalez, LA	Missouri
Samu Taumanupepe	88	DL	6'3"	375	Jr	Humble, TX	Baylor
Fisher Clements	89	TE	6'7"	265	GS	Hattiesberg, MS	Northern Colorado
Tyler Moore	90	DL	5'10	290	Jr	Locust Grove, GA	Coastal Carolina
Sedrick Smith	91	DL	6'4"	320	Jr	Atlanta, GA	Maryland
Yamil Talib	95	DE	6'2"	240	So	Richardson, TX	Charlotte
Balansama Kamara	96	DE	6'3"	260	Sr	Philadelphia, PA	Albany
Santana Hopper	97	DL	6'2"	265	Sr	Shelby, NC	Tulane
Ezra Christensen	98	DL	6'2"	280	Sr	Poway, CA	New Mexico State
Dylan Manuel	99	DL	6'1"	300	Fr	Stockbridge, GA	Appalachian State

==== Recruiting class ====
College recruiting (2026)
Name	Hometown	School	Height	Weight	Commit date
Preston Ashley; CB	Brandon, MS	Brandon HS	5 ft 11 in (1.80 m)	180 lb (82 kg)	Jun 24, 2025
Preston Ashley; CB	Recruit ratings: Rivals: 247Sports: ESPN: (83)				
Malachi Brown; DL	Milpitas, CA	Monterey Peninsula College (JUCO)	6 ft 3 in (1.91 m)	315 lb (143 kg)	May 23, 2026
Malachi Brown; DL	Recruit ratings: Rivals: 247Sports:				
Rodney Colton Jr. LB	Newnan, GA	Newnan HS	6 ft 1 in (1.85 m)	225 lb (102 kg)	Jul 12, 2025
Rodney Colton Jr. LB	Recruit ratings: Rivals: 247Sports: ESPN: (80)				
Carson Crawford; LB	Carthage, TX	Carthage HS	6 ft 4 in (1.93 m)	220 lb (100 kg)	Jul 10, 2025
Carson Crawford; LB	Recruit ratings: Rivals: 247Sports: ESPN: (77)				
Braylon Edwards; CB	Duncanville, TX	Duncanville HS	5 ft 11 in (1.80 m)	180 lb (82 kg)	Dec 5, 2025
Braylon Edwards; CB	Recruit ratings: Rivals: 247Sports: ESPN: (76)				
Sam Gadie; EDGE	Trenton, NJ	Monroe CC	6 ft 3 in (1.91 m)	235 lb (107 kg)	Apr 4, 2026
Sam Gadie; EDGE	Recruit ratings: Rivals: 247Sports:				
Ben Gula; OL	Weston, FL	Cypress Bay HS	6 ft 5 in (1.96 m)	285 lb (129 kg)	Aug 1, 2025
Ben Gula; OL	Recruit ratings: Rivals: 247Sports: ESPN: (77)				
Colby Johnson; LB	Sammamish, WA	Eastlake HS	6 ft 2 in (1.88 m)	195 lb (88 kg)	Jul 1, 2025
Colby Johnson; LB	Recruit ratings: Rivals: 247Sports: ESPN: (74)				
Josiah Manu; OL	Loveland, CO	Thompson Valley HS	6 ft 5 in (1.96 m)	295 lb (134 kg)	Aug 9, 2025
Josiah Manu; OL	Recruit ratings: Rivals: 247Sports: ESPN: (76)				
Cam Newton; RB	Prosper, TX	Walnut Grove HS	5 ft 9 in (1.75 m)	180 lb (82 kg)	Jan 19, 2026
Cam Newton; RB	Recruit ratings: Rivals: 247Sports:				
Xavier Payne; OL	Canandaigua, NY	Jones HS	6 ft 7 in (2.01 m)	320 lb (150 kg)	Jul 7, 2025
Xavier Payne; OL	Recruit ratings: Rivals: 247Sports: ESPN: (77)				
Domata Peko Jr. DE	Calabasas, CA	Ventura College (JUCO)	6 ft 4 in (1.93 m)	235 lb (107 kg)	Apr 28, 2025
Domata Peko Jr. DE	Recruit ratings: Rivals: 247Sports: ESPN: (80)				
Jacob Swain; WR	Melissa, TX	Melissa HS	6 ft 1 in (1.85 m)	185 lb (84 kg)	Feb 2, 2026
Jacob Swain; WR	Recruit ratings: Rivals: 247Sports:				
Kaneal Sweetwyne; QB	Lehi, UT	Skyridge HS	6 ft 3 in (1.91 m)	195 lb (88 kg)	Jan 11, 2026
Kaneal Sweetwyne; QB	Recruit ratings: Rivals: 247Sports: ESPN: (77)				
Alex Ward; ATH	Carrollton, GA	IMG Academy (Fla.)	6 ft 1 in (1.85 m)	180 lb (82 kg)	Nov 4, 2025
Alex Ward; ATH	Recruit ratings: Rivals: 247Sports: ESPN: (80)				
Christian Ward; WR	Carrollton, GA	IMG Academy (Fla.)	6 ft 3 in (1.91 m)	205 lb (93 kg)	Sep 24, 2025
Christian Ward; WR	Recruit ratings: Rivals: 247Sports: ESPN: (79)				
Mojo Williams Jr. CB	New Orleans, LA	Edna Karr HS	5 ft 11 in (1.80 m)	170 lb (77 kg)	Jun 25, 2025
Mojo Williams Jr. CB	Recruit ratings: Rivals: 247Sports: ESPN: (75)				
Trey Young; LS	San Juan Capistrano, CA	Saddleback College (JUCO)	5 ft 10 in (1.78 m)	195 lb (88 kg)	Jan 10, 2026
Trey Young; LS	Recruit ratings: Rivals:				
Overall recruit ranking: Rivals: #51 247Sports: #67
Note: In many cases, Scout, Rivals, 247Sports, On3, and ESPN may conflict in their listings of height and weight.; In these cases, the average was taken. ESPN grades are on a 100-point scale.; Sources:

==== Coaches acquisitions ====
Name	Previous Position	New Position
Vonn Bell	None	Colorado - Safeties
Aaron Fletcher	Abilene Christian - Co-defensive coordinator/associate head coach	Colorado - Cornerbacks
Justin Houlihan	Sacramento State - Graduate assistant/tight ends coach	Colorado - Offensive analyst/quarterbacks
Kenny Ingram	UCF - Defensive line	Colorado - Defensive analyst/defensive line
Brennan Marion	Sacramento State - Head coach	Colorado - Offensive coordinator/quarterbacks
Chris Marve	Virginia Tech - Defensive coordinator/interior linebackers	Colorado - Defensive coordinator/linebackers
Josh Niblett	Gainesville HS - Head coach	Colorado - Tight ends
Clancy Pendergast	UCLA - Analyst	Colorado - Senior defensive analyst/linebackers
Kyle Wagner	Sacramento State - Offensive analyst/assistant running backs	Colorado - Offensive analyst/tight ends

== Preseason ==
=== Spring game ===
The Colorado Buffaloes spring game was held on April 11, 2026, at Folsom Field.

Colorado Black vs Gold

Quarter	1	2	3	4	Total
Black	0	3	0	3	6
Gold	7	0	0	0	7

at Folsom Field, Boulder, CO

- Date: April 11, 2026
- Game time: 1:00 p.m. MDT
- Game attendance: 17,500

=== Big 12 media days ===
The Big 12 Conference discontinued their media preseason poll in 2025, however, an unofficial poll by Big 12 writers sponsored by the Tulsa World predicted Colorado to finish 15th in the conference. Likewise, the Buffaloes were predicted to finish in 15th place in the USA Today Big 12 preseason poll. No Colorado players appeared in the Big 12 all-conference team.

== Schedule ==
Date	Time	Opponent	Site	TV	Result	Attendance
September 3	6:00 p.m.	at Georgia Tech*	Bobby Dodd Stadium; Atlanta, GA	ESPN	W 14–13	52,113
September 12	1:30 p.m.	Weber State*	Folsom Field; Boulder, CO	ESPN+	W 52–21	49,363
September 19	5:30 p.m.	at Northwestern*	Martin Stadium; Evanston, IL	FOX	L 7–41	12,023
September 26	10:00 a.m.	at Baylor	McLane Stadium; Waco, TX	ESPN2	L 13–23	40,015
October 3	5:30 p.m.	No. 12 Texas Tech^{†}	Folsom Field; Boulder, CO	FOX	L 7–29	50,106
October 17	8:15 p.m.	No. 11 Utah	Folsom Field; Boulder, CO (Rumble in the Rockies)	ESPN	L 24–27	52,489
October 24	5:00 p.m.	at Oklahoma State	Boone Pickens Stadium; Stillwater, OK	FS1	L 24–57	52,168
October 31	12:00 p.m.	Kansas State	Folsom Field; Boulder, CO (rivalry)	TNT/TruTV	W 27–24 ^{OT}	46,325
November 7	5:30 p.m.	at Arizona State	Mountain America Stadium; Tempe, AZ	ESPN2	L 10–20	54,166
November 13	8:15 p.m.	No. 14 Houston	Folsom Field; Boulder, CO	ESPN	W 42–32	47,495
November 21	10:00 a.m.	at Cincinnati	Nippert Stadium; Cincinnati, OH	ESPN+	L 28–35	36,792
November 28	12:00 p.m.	UCF	Folsom Field; Boulder, CO	TNT/TruTV		
*Non-conference game; ^{†}Homecoming; Rankings from AP Poll (and CFP Rankings, after November 3) – Released prior to game; All times are in Mountain time

== Game summaries ==
=== at Georgia Tech ===
Colorado Buffaloes (0–0) at Georgia Tech Yellow Jackets (0–0) – Game summary

Quarter	1	2	3	4	Total
Buffaloes	0	7	0	7	14
Yellow Jackets	0	10	0	3	13

at Bobby Dodd Stadium • Atlanta, Georgia

- Date: September 3, 2026
- Game time: 6:00 p.m. MDT
- Game weather: Sunny • Temperature: 85 °F (29 °C)
- Game attendance: 52,113
- Referee: Jon Noli
- TV announcers (ESPN): Matt Barrie (play-by-play), Chase Daniel (analyst), and Paul Carcaterra (sideline)

Game information

First quarter

- No scoring plays.

Second quarter

- (13:06) COLO – Micah Welch 5-yard run, Daniel Gerlach kick (Drive: 5 plays, 35 yards, 1:45; Colorado 7–0)
- (12:52) GT – Rahkeem Smith 100-yard kickoff return, Aidan Birr kick (Tied 7–7)
- (2:03) GT – Aidan Birr 22-yard field goal (Drive: 12 plays, 92 yards, 5:35; Georgia Tech 10–7)

Third quarter

- No scoring plays.

Fourth quarter

- (1:40) GT – Aidan Birr 29-yard field goal (Drive: 13 plays, 68 yards, 5:55; Georgia Tech 13–7)
- (0:37) COLO – Charlie Williams 20-yard pass from Julian Lewis, Daniel Gerlach kick (Drive: 8 plays, 75 yards, 1:03; Colorado 14–13)

Statistics	COLO	GT
First downs	21	17
Plays–yards	76–307	54–288
Rushes–yards	49–183	30–51
Passing yards	124	237
Passing: comp–att–int	14–27–0	17–24–0
Turnovers	0	1
Time of possession	34:09	25:51

Team	Category	Player	Statistics
Colorado	Passing	Julian Lewis	14/27, 124 yards, TD
Colorado	Rushing	Damian Henderson II	12 carries, 65 yards
Colorado	Receiving	DeAndre Moore Jr.	4 receptions, 37 yards
Georgia Tech	Passing	Alberto Mendoza	17/23, 237 yards
Georgia Tech	Rushing	Justice Haynes	19 carries, 64 yards
Georgia Tech	Receiving	Jordan Allen	8 receptions, 113 yards

=== vs Weber State (FCS) ===
Weber State Wildcats (FCS) (1–1) at Colorado Buffaloes (1–0) – Game summary

Quarter	1	2	3	4	Total
Wildcats (FCS)	7	7	0	7	21
Buffaloes	21	21	3	7	52

at Folsom Field • Boulder, Colorado

- Date: September 12, 2026
- Game time: 1:30 p.m. MDT
- Game weather: Cloudy • Temperature: 73 °F (23 °C)
- Game attendance: 49,363
- Referee: Cravonne Barrett
- TV announcers (ESPN+): Pete Sousa (play-by-play) and Leger Douzable (analyst)

Game information

First quarter

- (14:25) COLO – DeAndre Moore Jr. 66-yard pass from Julian Lewis, Elliot Arnold kick (Drive: 1 play, 66 yards, 0:10; Colorado 7–0)
- (11:54) COLO – Joseph Williams 63-yard pass from Julian Lewis, Elliot Arnold kick (Drive: 2 plays, 63 yards, 0:17; Colorado 14–0)
- (7:07) WEB – Robert Young 13-yard pass from Nate Dahle, David Dellenbach kick (Drive: 5 plays, 28 yards, 1:37; Colorado 14–7)
- (4:52) Ernest Campbell 48-yard pass from Julian Lewis, Elliot Arnold kick (Drive: 5 plays, 68 yards, 2:06; Colorado 21–7)

Second quarter

- (14:50) COLO – Micah Welch 55-yard run, Elliot Arnold kick (Drive: 5 plays, 71 yards, 1:29; Colorado 28–7)
- (12:11) WEB – Noah Kjar 6-yard pass from Nate Dahle, David Dellenbach kick (Drive: 6 plays, 75 yards, 2:39; Colorado 28–14)
- (7:38) COLO – Joseph Williams 32-yard pass from Julian Lewis, Elliot Arnold kick (Drive: 9 plays, 90 yards, 4:25; Colorado 35–14)
- (0:51) COLO – Julian Lewis 3-yard run, Elliot Arnold kick (Drive: 7 plays, 55 yards, 1:01; Colorado 42–14)

Third quarter

- (8:09) COLO – Elliot Arnold 52-yard field goal (Drive: 15 plays, 58 yards, 6:47; Colorado 45–14)

Fourth quarter

- (11:35) COLO – Kaneal Sweetwyne 9-yard run, Elliot Arnold kick (Drive: 11 plays, 57 yards, 4:19; Colorado 52–14)
- (7:42) WEB – Noah Kjar 12-yard pass from Nate Dahle, David Dellenbach kick (Drive: 8 plays, 79 yards, 3:45; Colorado 52–21)

Statistics	WEB	COLO
First downs	23	24
Plays–yards	81–373	73–578
Rushes–yards	29–128	38–180
Passing yards	245	398
Passing: comp–att–int	22–52–1	26–35–0
Turnovers	2	2
Time of possession	29:55	30:05

Team	Category	Player	Statistics
Weber State	Passing	Nate Dahle	20/48, 244 yards, 3 TD, INT
Weber State	Rushing	Omar Shah	12 carries, 65 yards
Weber State	Receiving	Noah Kjar	7 receptions, 121 yards, 2 TD
Colorado	Passing	Julian Lewis	17/23, 366 yards, 4 TD
Colorado	Rushing	Micah Welch	11 carries, 106 yards, TD
Colorado	Receiving	Joseph Williams	4 receptions, 123 yards, 2 TD

=== at Northwestern ===
Colorado Buffaloes (2–0) at Northwestern Wildcats (1–0) – Game summary

Quarter	1	2	3	4	Total
Buffaloes	0	0	7	0	7
Wildcats	7	14	14	6	41

at Martin Stadium • Evanston, Illinois

- Date: September 19, 2026
- Game time: 5:30 p.m. MDT
- Game weather: Cloudy • Temperature: 69 °F (21 °C)
- Game attendance: 12,023
- Referee: Henry Johns
- TV announcers (FOX): Noah Reed (play-by-play), Devin Gardner (analyst) and Josh Sims (sideline)

Game information

First quarter

- (0:43) NWEST – Aidan Chiles 1-yard run, Jackson Kleather kick (Drive: 7 plays, 44 yards, 4:15; Northwestern 7–0)

Second quarter

- (7:59) NWEST – Joseph Himon II 18-yard pass from Aidan Chiles, Jackson Kleather kick (Drive: 2 plays, 18 yards, 0:37; Northwestern 14–0)
- (0:59) NWEST – Aidan Chiles 3-yard run, Jackson Kleather kick (Drive: 11 plays, 72 yards, 4:19; Northwestern 21–0)

Third quarter

- (10:24) COLO – Joseph Williams 50-yard pass from Julian Lewis, Elliot Arnold kick (Drive: 4 plays, 66 yards, 1:26; Northwestern 21–7)
- (6:27) NWEST – Joseph Himon II 25-yard pass from Aidan Chiles, Jackson Kleather kick (Drive: 8 plays, 60 yards, 3:52; Northwestern 28–7)
- (3:15) NWEST – Joseph Himon II 3-yard pass from Aidan Chiles, Jackson Kleather kick (Drive: 4 plays, 47 yards, 1:16; Northwestern 35–7)

Fourth quarter

- (13:09) NWEST – Jackson Kleather 36-yard field goal (Drive: 9 plays, 61 yards, 3:07; Northwestern 38–7)
- (3:06) NWEST – Jackson Kleather 21-yard field goal (Drive: 11 plays, 66 yards, 7:13; Northwestern 41–7)

Statistics	COLO	NU
First downs	18	21
Plays–yards	62–348	73–423
Rushes–yards	33–180	51–182
Passing yards	168	241
Passing: comp–att–int	19–29–2	17–22–0
Turnovers	4	1
Time of possession	23:07	36:53

Team	Category	Player	Statistics
Colorado	Passing	Julian Lewis	19/29, 158 yards, TD, 2 INT
Colorado	Rushing	JaQuail Smith	8 carries, 91 yards
Colorado	Receiving	DeAndre Moore Jr.	7 receptions, 56 yards
Northwestern	Passing	Aidan Chiles	17/22, 241 yards, 3 TD
Northwestern	Rushing	Caleb Komolafe	11 carries, 49 yards
Northwestern	Receiving	Griffin Wilde	5 receptions, 85 yards

=== at Baylor ===
Colorado Buffaloes (2–1) at Baylor Bears (2–1) – Game summary

Quarter	1	2	3	4	Total
Buffaloes	3	0	3	7	13
Bears	0	10	3	10	23

at McLane Stadium • Waco, Texas

- Date: September 26, 2026
- Game time: 10:00 a.m. MDT
- Game weather: Cloudy • Temperature: 82 °F (28 °C)
- Game attendance: 40,015
- Referee: Stephen Baron
- TV announcers (ESPN2): Lowell Galindo (play-by-play), Kirk Morrison (analyst), and Dawn Davenport (sideline)

Game information

First quarter

- (3:22) COLO – Elliot Arnold 24-yard field goal (Drive: 7 plays, 74 yards, 2:40; Colorado 3–0)

Second quarter

- (13:28) BAY – Rhett Armstrong 37-yard field goal (Drive: 13 plays, 54 yards, 4:45; Tied 3–3)
- (7:04) BAY – Gavin Freeman 3-yard pass from DJ Lagway, Rhett Armstrong kick (Drive: 3 plays, 48 yards, 1:20; Baylor 7–3)

Third quarter

- (7:14) BAY – Rhett Armstrong 37-yard field goal (Drive: 5 plays, 38 yards, 1:19; Baylor 13–3)
- (2:17) COLO – Elliot Arnold 46-yard field goal (Drive: 6 plays, 63 yards, 2:12; Baylor 13–6)

Fourth quarter

- (11:04) COLO – Joseph Williams 17-yard pass from Isaac Wilson, Elliot Arnold kick (Drive: 12 plays, 95 yards, 4:35; Tied 13–13)
- (9:02) BAY – Jadon Porter 33-yard pass from DJ Lagway, Rhett Armstrong kick (Drive: 5 plays, 65 yards, 2:02; Baylor 20–13)
- (4:28) BAY – Rhett Armstrong 54-yard field goal (Drive: 9 plays, 43 yards, 3:36; Baylor 23–13)

Statistics	COLO	BAY
First downs	24	22
Plays–yards	81–363	74–337
Rushes–yards	39–83	35–116
Passing yards	280	221
Passing: comp–att–int	24–42–0	19–39–1
Time of possession	31:26	28:34

Team	Category	Player	Statistics
Colorado	Passing	Isaac Wilson	12/25, 156 yards, TD
Colorado	Rushing	Micah Welch	9 carries, 35 yards
Colorado	Receiving	Joseph Williams	11 receptions, 127 yards, TD
Baylor	Passing	DJ Lagway	19/39, 221 yards, 2 TD, INT
Baylor	Rushing	Dawson Pendergrass	18 carries, 85 yards
Baylor	Receiving	Gavin Freeman	6 receptions, 59 yards, TD

=== vs No. 12 Texas Tech ===
No. 12 Texas Tech Red Raiders (4–0) at Colorado Buffaloes (2–2) – Game summary

Quarter	1	2	3	4	Total
No. 12 Red Raiders	3	0	9	17	29
Buffaloes	7	0	0	0	7

at Folsom Field • Boulder, Colorado

- Date: October 3, 2026
- Game time: 5:30 p.m. MDT
- Game weather: Clear • Temperature: 81 °F (27 °C) • Wind: NE 14 mph
- Game attendance: 50,106
- Referee: Michael McCabe
- TV announcers (FOX): Noah Reed (play-by-play), Devin Gardner (analyst), and Josh Sims (sideline)
- Box score

Game information

First quarter

- (10:29) COLO – Joseph Williams 8-yard pass from Isaac Wilson, Elliott Arnold kick (Drive: 9 plays, 75 yards, 4:31; Colorado 7–0)
- (7:05) TTU – Stone Harrington 52-yard field goal (Drive: 10 plays, 42 yards, 3:24; Colorado 7–3)

Second quarter

- No scoring plays

Third quarter

- (9:09) TTU – Stone Harrington 27-yard field goal (Drive: 6 plays, 21 yards, 2:21; Colorado 7–6)
- (3:01) TTU – Terrance Carter Jr. 11-yard pass from Will Hammond, two-point conversion failed (Drive: 7 plays, 79 yards, 3:42; Texas Tech 12–7)

Fourth quarter

- (12:03) TTU – Stone Harrington 46-yard field goal (Drive: 5 plays, 8 yards, 3:30; Texas Tech 15–7)
- (7:10) TTU – John Curry end-zone interception, Stone Harrington kick (Texas Tech 22–7)
- (3:06) TTU – Quinten Joyner 30-yard run, Stone Harrington kick (Drive: 3 plays, 41 yards, 1:40; Texas Tech 29–7)

Statistics	TTU	COLO
First downs	19	22
Plays–yards	63–315	80–375
Rushes–yards	37–181	32–78
Passing yards	134	297
Passing: comp–att–int	17–26–0	28–48–4
Time of possession	28:56	31:04

Team	Category	Player	Statistics
Texas Tech	Passing	Will Hammond	17/26, 134 yards, TD
Texas Tech	Rushing	J'Koby Williams	17 rushes, 88 yards
Texas Tech	Receiving	Terrance Carter Jr.	8 receptions, 67 yards, TD
Colorado	Passing	Isaac Wilson	26/44, 290 yards, TD, 3 INT
Colorado	Rushing	Isaac Wilson	17 rushes, 42 yards
Colorado	Receiving	Joseph Williams	10 receptions, 93 yards, TD

=== vs No. 11 Utah (Rumble in the Rockies) ===
No. 11 Utah Utes (5–0) at Colorado Buffaloes (2–3) – Game summary

Quarter	1	2	3	4	Total
No. 11 Utes	7	6	7	7	27
Buffaloes	0	0	17	7	24

at Folsom Field • Boulder, Colorado

- Date: October 17, 2026
- Game time: 8:15 p.m. MDT
- Game weather: Clear • Temperature: 59 °F (15 °C) • Wind: W 12 mph
- Game attendance: 52,489
- Referee: Kevin Boitmann
- TV announcers (ESPN): Jay Alter (play-by-play), Tom Luginbill (analyst), and Sherree Burress (sideline)

Game information

First quarter

- (9:39) UTAH – Hunter Andrews 8-yard pass from Devon Dampier, Dillon Curtis kick (Drive: 12 plays, 75 yards, 5:21; Utah 7–0)

Second quarter

- (8:58) UTAH – Dillon Curtis 27-yard field goal (Drive: 17 plays, 84 yards, 8:35; Utah 10–0)
- (0:00) UTAH – Dillon Curtis 29-yard field goal (Drive: 6 plays, 47 yards, 1:07; Utah 13–0)

Third quarter

- (13:20) COLO – JaQuail Smith 68-yard pass from Isaac Wilson, Elliot Arnold kick (Drive: 3 plays, 75 yards, 1:40; Utah 13–7)
- (9:45) COLO – DeKalon Taylor 18-yard run, Elliot Arnold kick (Drive: 5 plays, 76 yards, 2:06; Colorado 14–13)
- (4:24) COLO – Elliot Arnold 32-yard field goal (Drive: 7 plays, 21 yards, 3:28; Colorado 17–13)
- (1:06) UTAH – Braden Pegan 16-yard pass from Devon Dampier, Dillon Curtis kick (Drive: 8 plays, 75 yards, 3:18; Utah 20–17)

Fourth quarter

- (3:43) UTAH – Braden Pegan 6-yard pass from Devon Dampier, Dillon Curtis kick (Drive: 3 plays, 22 yards, 1:26; Utah 27–17)
- (1:21) COLO – DeAndre Moore Jr. 2-yard pass from Isaac Wilson, Elliot Arnold kick (Drive: 8 plays, 83 yards, 2:15; Utah 27–24)

Statistics	UTAH	COLO
First downs	26	19
Plays–yards	80–409	55–394
Rushes–yards	39–131	24–138
Passing yards	278	256
Passing: comp–att–int	24–41–2	18–31–2
Time of possession	37:00	23:00

Team	Category	Player	Statistics
Utah	Passing	Devon Dampier	24/41, 278 yards, 3 TD, 2 INT
Utah	Rushing	Wayshawn Parker	23 carries, 98 yards
Utah	Receiving	Creed Whittemore	3 receptions, 88 yards
Colorado	Passing	Isaac Wilson	18/30, 256 yards, 2 TD, 2 INT
Colorado	Rushing	JaQuail Smith	13 carries, 73 yards
Colorado	Receiving	DeAndre Moore Jr.	5 receptions, 70 yards, TD

=== at Oklahoma State ===
Colorado Buffaloes (2–4) at Oklahoma State Cowboys (4–2) – Game summary

Quarter	1	2	3	4	Total
Buffaloes	14	10	0	0	24
Cowboys	7	16	14	20	57

at Boone Pickens Stadium • Stillwater, Oklahoma

- Date: October 24, 2026
- Game time: 5:00 p.m. MDT
- Game weather: Sunny • Temperature: 75 °F (24 °C) • Wind: SE 8 mph
- Game attendance: 52,168
- Referee: Cravonne Barrett
- TV announcers (FS1): Carlo Jiménez (play-by-play) and Robert Smith (analyst)

Game information

First quarter

- (14:01) OKST – Miles Coleman 47-yard pass from Drew Mestemaker, Sam Keltner kick (Drive: 3 plays, 75 yards, 0:59; Oklahoma State 7–0)
- (7:23) COLO – JaQuail Smith 4-yard pass from Isaac Wilson, Elliot Arnold kick (Drive: 12 plays, 75 yards, 6:38; Tied 7–7)
- (0:03) COLO – DeAndre Moore Jr. 15-yard pass from Isaac Wilson, Elliot Arnold kick (Drive: 11 plays, 71 yards, 5:39; Colorado 14–7)

Second quarter

- (11:48) OKST – Sam Keltner 47-yard field goal (Drive: 10 plays, 46 yards, 3:15; Colorado 14–10)
- (8:48) OKST – Justin Bowick 14-yard pass from Drew Mestemaker, Sam Keltner kick (Drive: 4 plays, 69 yards, 1:35; Oklahoma State 17–14)
- (6:19) COLO – Isaac Wilson 1-yard run, Elliot Arnold kick (Drive: 6 plays, 75 yards, 2:29; Colorado 21–17)
- (4:14) OKST – Sam Keltner 30-yard field goal (Drive: 6 plays, 64 yards, 2:05; Colorado 21–20)
- (2:30) COLO – Elliot Arnold kick 45-yard field goal (Drive: 5 plays, 48 yards, 1:44; Colorado 24–20)
- (0:14) OKST – Sam Keltner 41-yard field goal (Drive: 11 plays, 52 yards, 2:16; Colorado 24–23)

Third quarter

- (14:11) OKST – Morgan McPhaul 3-yard pass from Drew Mestemaker, Sam Keltner kick (Drive: 2 plays, 13 yards, 0:44; Oklahoma State 30–24)
- (8:48) OKST – William Mason 3-yard run, Sam Keltner kick (Drive: 8 plays, 78 yards, 2:39; Oklahoma State 37–24)

Fourth quarter

- (14:17) OKST – Sam Keltner 21-yard field goal (Drive: 11 plays, 64 yards, 4:37; Oklahoma State 40–24)
- (9:29) OKST – Wyatt Young 28-yard pass from Drew Mestemaker, Sam Keltner kick (Drive: 6 plays, 62 yards, 3:15; Oklahoma State 47–24)
- (7:01) OKST – Sam Keltner 30-yard field goal (Drive: 4 plays, -3 yards, 0:47; Oklahoma State 50–24)
- (1:18) OKST – Tre Page III 18-yard run, Sam Keltner kick (Drive: 8 plays, 58 yards, 4:42; Oklahoma State 57–24)

Statistics	COLO	OKST
First downs	18	28
Plays–yards	62–399	76–598
Rushes–yards	30–56	38–188
Passing yards	343	410
Passing: comp–att–int	22–32–2	23–38–0
Time of possession	29:15	30:45

Team	Category	Player	Statistics
Colorado	Passing	Isaac Wilson	19/27, 280 yards, 2 TD, 2 INT
Colorado	Rushing	JaQuail Smith	13 carries, 39 yards
Colorado	Receiving	Joseph Williams	9 receptions, 135 yards
Oklahoma State	Passing	Drew Mestemaker	21/36, 386 yards, 4 TD
Oklahoma State	Rushing	Caleb Hawkins	19 carries, 120 yards
Oklahoma State	Receiving	Justin Bowick	5 receptions, 138 yards, TD

=== vs Kansas State (rivalry) ===
Kansas State Wildcats (4–3) at Colorado Buffaloes (2–5) – Game summary

Quarter	1	2	3	4	OT	Total
Wildcats	0	7	7	7	3	24
Buffaloes	7	0	7	7	6	27

at Folsom Field • Boulder, Colorado

- Date: October 31, 2026
- Game time: 12:00 p.m. MDT
- Game weather: Sunny • Temperature: 55 °F (13 °C) • Wind: N 3 mph
- Game attendance: 46,325
- Referee: Kevin Boitmann
- TV announcers (TNT/TruTV): J.B. Long (play-by-play), Mike Golic Jr. (analyst), and Jared Greenberg (sideline)

Game information

First quarter

- (1:42) COLO – Richard Young 2-yard run, Elliot Arnold kick (Drive: 6 plays, 60 yards, 2:50; Colorado 7–0)

Second quarter

- (2:25) KSU – Josh Manning 28-yard pass from Blake Barnett, Luis Rodriguez kick (Drive: 11 plays, 80 yards, 7:07; Tied 7–7)

Third quarter

- (4:35) COLO – JaQuail Smith 47-yard run, Elliot Arnold kick (Drive: 4 plays, 71 yards, 1:33; Colorado 14–7)
- (2:14) KSU – Linkon Cure 33-yard pass from Blake Barnett, Luis Rodriguez kick (Drive: 4 plays, 75 yards, 2:22; Tied 14–14)

Fourth quarter

- (12:27) COLO – Richard Young 22-yard run, Elliot Arnold kick (Drive: 10 plays, 96 yards, 4:44; Colorado 21–14)
- (0:02) KSU – Garrett Oakley 8-yard pass from Blake Barnett, Luis Rodriguez kick (Drive: 6 plays, 62 yards, 0:53; Tied 21–21)

Overtime

- (0:00) KSU – Luis Rodriguez 25-yard field goal (Drive: 7 plays, 18 yards, 0:00; Kansas State 24–21)
- (0:00) COLO – Charlie Williams 11-yard pass from Isaac Wilson (Drive: 5 plays, 25 yards, 0:00; Colorado 27–24)

Statistics	KSU	COLO
First downs	19	20
Plays–yards	69–347	64–407
Rushes–yards	39–121	43–222
Passing yards	226	185
Passing: comp–att–int	19–30–0	14–21–0
Time of possession	31:56	28:04

Team	Category	Player	Statistics
Kansas State	Passing	Blake Barnett	18/28, 224 yards, 3 TD
Kansas State	Rushing	Rodney Fields Jr.	12 carries, 65 yards
Kansas State	Receiving	Josh Manning	6 receptions, 73 yards, TD
Colorado	Passing	Isaac Wilson	14/21, 185 yards, TD
Colorado	Rushing	Richard Young	24 carries, 120 yards, 2 TD
Colorado	Receiving	Joseph Williams	5 receptions, 89 yards

=== at Arizona State ===
Colorado Buffaloes (3–5) at Arizona State Sun Devils (4–4) – Game summary

Quarter	1	2	3	4	Total
Buffaloes	0	0	3	7	10
Sun Devils	3	14	0	3	20

at Mountain America Stadium • Tempe, Arizona

- Date: November 7, 2026
- Game time: 5:30 p.m. MST
- Game weather: Sunny • Temperature: 81 °F (27 °C) • Wind: E 6 mph
- Game attendance: 54,166
- Referee: Henry Johns
- TV announcers (ESPN2): Chuckie Kempf (play-by-play), Dustin Fox (analyst), and Lauren Sisler (sideline)

Game information

First quarter

- (6:31) ASU – Carson Smith 31-yard field goal (Drive: 13 plays, 61 yards, 6:36; Arizona State 3–0)

Second quarter

- (11:12) ASU – Jake Fette 1-yard pass from Cardae Mack, Carson Smith kick (Drive: 10 plays, 66 yards, 4:35; Arizona State 10–0)
- (2:54) ASU – Reed Harris 34-yard pass from Jake Fette, Carson Smith kick (Drive: 5 plays, 42 yards, 2:35; Arizona State 17–0)

Third quarter

- (0:00) COLO – Elliot Arnold 39-yard field goal (Drive: 15 plays, 61 yards, 6:29; Arizona State 17–3)

Fourth quarter

- (12:09) ASU – Carson Smith 21-yard field goal (Drive: 7 plays, 71 yards, 2:51; Arizona State 20–3)
- (8:14) COLO – Joseph Williams 7-yard pass from Isaac Wilson, Daniel Gerlach kick (Drive: 10 plays, 75 yards, 3:55; Arizona State 20–10)

Statistics	COLO	ASU
First downs	17	15
Plays–yards	65–312	64–304
Rushes–yards	34–64	42–108
Passing yards	248	196
Passing: comp–att–int	20–31–1	15–22–0
Time of possession	26:54	33:06

Team	Category	Player	Statistics
Colorado	Passing	Isaac Wilson	20/31, 248 yards, TD, INT
Colorado	Rushing	Richard Young	15 carries, 47 yards
Colorado	Receiving	Joseph Williams	7 receptions, 121 yards, TD
Arizona State	Passing	Jake Fette	13/19, 187 yards, TD
Arizona State	Rushing	Cardae Mack	24 carries, 80 yards
Arizona State	Receiving	Reed Harris	4 receptions, 103 yards, TD

=== vs No. 14 Houston ===
No. 14 Houston Cougars (7–2) at Colorado Buffaloes (3–6) – Game summary

Quarter	1	2	3	4	Total
No. 14 Cougars	3	17	0	12	32
Buffaloes	0	21	14	7	42

at Folsom Field • Boulder, Colorado

- Date: November 13, 2026
- Game time: 8:15 p.m. MST
- Game weather: Cloudy • Temperature: 46 °F (8 °C) • Wind: SW 6 mph
- Game attendance: 47,495
- Referee: Michael McCabe
- TV announcers (ESPN): Anish Shroff (play-by-play), Andre Ware (analyst), and Morgan Uber (sideline)

Game information

First quarter

- (7:50) HOU – Jonathan Dimas 27-yard field goal (Drive: 15 plays, 66 yards, 7:10; Houston 3–0)

Second quarter

- (14:55) HOU – Makhi Hughes 8-yard run, Jonathan Dimas kick (Drive: 13 plays, 85 yards, 5:41; Houston 10–0)
- (9:25) COLO – Richard Young 38-yard run, Daniel Gerlach kick (Drive: 10 plays, 94 yards, 5:23; Houston 10–7)
- (6:52) HOU – Amare Thomas 4-yard pass from Conner Weigman, Jonathan Dimas kick (Drive: 6 plays, 75 yards, 2:33; Houston 17–7)
- (2:36) HOU – Jonathan Dimas 52-yard field goal (Drive: 9 plays, 46 yards, 3:25; Houston 20–7)
- (1:49) COLO – DeKalon Taylor 67-yard run, Daniel Gerlach kick (Drive: 3 plays, 75 yards, 0:47; Houston 20–14)
- (0:15) COLO – Jaquail Smith 32-yard run, Daniel Gerlach kick (Drive: 4 plays, 56 yards, 0:36; Colorado 21–20)

Third quarter

- (13:21) COLO – Joseph Williams 53-yard pass from Isaac Wilson, Daniel Gerlach kick (Drive: 3 plays, 55 yards, 1:28; Colorado 28–20)
- (5:26) COLO – Kaneal Sweetwyne 14-yard run, Daniel Gerlach kick (Drive: 11 plays, 66 yards, 5:41; Colorado 35–20)

Fourth quarter

- (10:00) HOU – Patrick Overmyer 22-yard pass from Conner Weigman, two-point conversion failed (Drive: 8 plays, 62 yards, 2:12; Colorado 35–26)
- (3:59) COLO – Richard Young 2-yard run, Daniel Gerlach kick (Drive: 11 plays, 75 yards, 6:01; Colorado 42–26)
- (1:51) HOU – Trent Walker 4-yard pass from Conner Weigman, two-point conversion failed (Drive: 9 plays, 75 yards, 2:08; Colorado 42–32)

Statistics	HOU	COLO
First downs	28	20
Plays–yards	76–477	64–466
Rushes–yards	34–205	39–249
Passing yards	272	217
Passing: comp–att–int	26–42–1	17–25–1
Time of possession	29:58	30:02

Team	Category	Player	Statistics
Houston	Passing	Conner Weigman	26/42, 272 yards, 3 TD, INT
Houston	Rushing	Makhi Hughes	15 carries, 106 yards, TD
Houston	Receiving	Patrick Overmyer	9 receptions, 116 yards, TD
Colorado	Passing	Isaac Wilson	17/25, 217 yards, TD, INT
Colorado	Rushing	Richard Young	21 carries, 99 yards, 2 TD
Colorado	Receiving	Joseph Williams	5 receptions, 80 yards, TD

=== at Cincinnati ===
Colorado Buffaloes (4–6) at Cincinnati Bearcats (5–5) – Game summary

Quarter	1	2	3	4	Total
Buffaloes	7	7	14	0	28
Bearcats	14	7	14	0	35

at Nippert Stadium • Cincinnati, Ohio

- Date: November 21, 2026
- Game time: 10:00 a.m. MST
- Game weather: Sunny • Temperature: 60 °F (16 °C) • Wind: S 3 mph
- Game attendance: 36,792
- Referee: Michael VanderVelde
- TV announcers (ESPN+): Peter Sousa (play-by-play) and Leger Douzable (analyst)

Game information

First quarter

- (9:35) CIN – Cole Tabb 1-yard run, Stephen Rusnak kick (Drive: 5 plays, 60 yards, 2:35; Cincinnati 7–0)
- (2:28) CIN – JC French IV 1-yard run, Stephen Rusnak kick (Drive: 10 plays, 66 yards, 5:42; Cincinnati 14–0)
- (0:09) COLO – Ernest Campbell 36-yard pass from Isaac Wilson, Daniel Gerlach kick (Drive: 6 plays, 75 yards, 2:20; Cincinnati 14–7)

Second quarter

- (0:56) COLO – Richard Young 4-yard run, Daniel Gerlach kick (Drive: 3 plays, 41 yards, 0:42; Tied 14–14)
- (0:12) CIN – Cole Tabb 22-yard pass from JC French IV, Stephen Rusnak kick (Drive: 6 plays, 75 yards, 0:44; Cincinnati 21–14)

Third quarter

- (7:53) CIN – Cole Tabb 1-yard run, Stephen Rusnak kick (Drive: 7 plays, 90 yards, 4:08; Cincinnati 28–14)
- (6:36) COLO – DeAndre Moore Jr. 54-yard pass from Isaac Wilson, Daniel Gerlach kick (Drive: 4 plays, 75 yards, 1:17; Cincinnati 28–21)
- (2:59) CIN – Cole Tabb 50-yard pass from JC French IV, Stephen Rusnak kick (Drive: 7 plays, 75 yards, 3:37; Cincinnati 35–21)
- (2:09) COLO – Joseph Williams 70-yard pass from Isaac Wilson, Daniel Gerlach kick (Drive: 3 plays, 75 yards, 0:50; Cincinnati 35–28)

Fourth quarter

- No scoring plays

Statistics	COLO	CIN
First downs	16	27
Plays–yards	54–433	73–433
Rushes–yards	28–121	54–225
Passing yards	312	208
Passing: comp–att–int	16–26–3	18–19–0
Time of possession	23:18	36:42

Team	Category	Player	Statistics
Colorado	Passing	Isaac Wilson	16/26, 312 yards, 3 TD, 3 INT
Colorado	Rushing	Richard Young	12 carries, 55 yards, TD
Colorado	Receiving	Joseph Williams	4 receptions, 112 yards, TD
Cincinnati	Passing	JC French IV	18/19, 208 yards, 2 TD
Cincinnati	Rushing	Cole Tabb	23 carries, 120 yards, 2 TD
Cincinnati	Receiving	Cole Tabb	7 receptions, 110 yards, 2 TD

=== vs UCF ===
UCF Knights (6–5) at Colorado Buffaloes (4–7) – Game summary

Quarter	1	2	Total
Knights			0
Buffaloes			0

at Folsom Field • Boulder, Colorado

- Date: November 28, 2026
- Game time: 12:00 p.m. MST
- TV: TNT/TruTV

Statistics	UCF	COLO
First downs		
Plays–yards		
Rushes–yards		
Passing yards		
Passing: comp–att–int		
Time of possession		

Team	Category	Player	Statistics
UCF	Passing		
UCF	Rushing		
UCF	Receiving		
Colorado	Passing		
Colorado	Rushing		
Colorado	Receiving		

== Personnel ==
=== Roster ===
2026 Colorado Buffaloes football team roster
Players
Coaches
Offense

Pos.	#	Name	Class
WR	3	Deandre Moore Jr.	Sr
WR	4	Ernest Campbell	So
WR	5	Hykeem Williams	Sr
WR	6	Quentin Gibson	So
WR	7	Kam Perry	Sr
QB	7	Dominiq Ponder	Jr
WR	8	Joseph Williams	Jr
RB	9	Richard Young	Jr
QB	10	Julian Lewis	Fr
WR	13	Kaleb Mathis	Jr
WR	14	Quanell Farrakhan Jr.	So
QB	14	Kaneal Sweetwyne	Fr
QB	16	Isaac Wilson	So
WR	17	Christian Ward	Fr
WR	18	Danny Scudero	Sr
RB	20	DeKalon Taylor	Sr
WR	22	Tagert Bardin	Jr
RB	23	Jaquail Smith	So
RB	26	Damian Henderson II	Jr
RB	27	Bryce Hicks	So
RB	29	Micah Welch	Jr
WR	32	Alex Ward	Fr
RB	34	Titus Bautista	So
WR	36	Carson Westbrook	So
RB	37	Leonardo Valle	Fr
OL	51	Chauncey Gooden	Fr
OL	52	Andre Roye Jr.	Sr
OL	53	Larry Johnson III	Sr
OL	54	Taj White	Sr
OL	55	Bo Hughley	Jr
OL	56	Phillip Houston	Sr
OL	57	Leon Bell	GS
OL	58	Demetrius Hunter	GS
OL	59	Yahya Attia	So
OL	62	Sean Kinney	Jr
OL	71	Jayvon McFadden	Fr
OL	72	Xavier Payne	Fr
OL	73	Jose Soto	Jr
OL	75	Jayven Richardson	Sr
OL	78	Hudson Steber	Fr
TE	82	Ben Gula	Fr
TE	83	Zayne DeSouza	Fr
TE	85	Zach Atkins	Sr
TE	86	Brady Kopetz	Sr
TE	87	Charlie Williams	Jr
TE	88	Corbin Laisure	Fr
TE	89	Fisher Clements	GS

Defense

Pos.	#	Name	Class
DB	4	Naeten Mitchell	Jr
DB	5	RJ Johnson	Jr
DB	6	Boo Carter	Jr
DB	7	Randon Fontenette	Sr
DB	8	Emory Floyd	Sr
DB	9	Jaydan Hardy	Fr
DB	10	Makari Vickers	Jr
DB	13	Jason Stokes Jr.	So
DB	15	Jah Jah Boyd	So
LB	17	Liona Lefau	Sr
DB	18	Paul Omodia	Jr
DB	20	Cree Thomas	Fr
DB	25	Mojo Williams Jr.	Fr
DB	26	Braylon Edwards	Fr
DE	27	Domata Peko Jr.	Jr
DB	28	Ben Finneseth	Sr
DB	30	Justin Eaglin	Sr
CB	31	Preston Ashley	Fr
DB	33	Kole Mathis	So
LB	35	Tyler Martinez	Fr
DB	39	Donovan Stephens	Fr
LB	40	Colby Johnson	Fr
DE	41	Kylan Salter	Jr
LB	44	Gideon Lampron	Sr
DL	45	Vili Taufatofua	Sr
DE	49	Quency Wiggins	Sr
LB	50	Rodney Colton Jr.	Fr
LB	51	Carson Crawford	Fr
DE	52	Immanuel Ezeogu	So
DE	53	Toby Arene	Sr
LB	54	Bo LaPenna	Sr
LB	55	Gage Goldberg	So
DL	56	Lamont Lester Jr.	So
DL	88	Samu Taumanupepe	Jr
DL	90	Tyler Moore	Jr
DL	91	Sedrick Smith	Jr
DL	94	Josiah Manu	Fr
DE	95	Yamil Talib	So
DE	96	Balansama Kamara	Sr
DL	97	Santana Hopper	Sr
DL	98	Ezra Christensen	Sr
DL	99	Dylan Manuel	Fr

Special teams

Pos.	#	Name	Class
P	35	Damon Greaves	Sr
P	38	Daniel Gerlach	Jr
LS	45	Luke Whiting	Jr
K	46	Elliot Arnold	Fr
LS	50	Trey Young	So
K	60	Josh McCormick	GS
LS	61	Aiden DeCorte	Jr

Head coach

- Deion Sanders

Coordinators/assistant coaches

- Brennan Marion – Offensive coordinator/Quarterbacks
- Chris Marve - Defensive coordinator/Linebackers
- George Helow - Defensive run game coordinator/Defensive Ends
- Kevin Mathis - Defensive passing game coordinator/Cornerbacks
- Gunnar White - Offensive run game coordinator/Offensive Line
- Dante Carter - Defensive Line Coach
- Aaron Fletcher - Cornerbacks Coach
- Andre Gurode - Offensive Line Coach
- Andre' Hart - Assistant Linebackers Coach
- George Hegamin - Offensive Line Coach
- Johnnie Mack - Running Backs Coach
- Josh Niblett - Tight Ends Coach
- Jason Phillips - Wide Receivers Coach
- Rashad Davis - Inside Receivers Coach
- Clancy Pendergast - Senior Defensive Analyst/Linebackers
- Vonn Bell - Defensive Analyst/Safeties
- Kenny Ingram - Defensive Analyst/Defensive Line
- Grant Hammer - Football Assistant/Offensive Line
- Justin Houlihan - Offensive Analyst/Quarterbacks
- Joc Upton - Offensive Analyst/Running Backs
- Kyle Wagner - Offensive Analyst/Tight Ends
- Caden Lowrie - Graduate Assistant/Defense
- Desmond Moultrie - Graduate Assistant/Defense

Legend

- (C) Team captain
- (S) Suspended
- (I) Ineligible
- Injured
- Redshirt

Roster
Last update: 3/14/26

== Statistics ==
=== Individual leaders ===
==== Offense ====
Passing statistics
#	NAME	POS	CMP	ATT	PCT	YDS	AVG/G	CMP%	TD	INT	LONG
	TOTALS										
	OPPONENTS										

Rushing statistics
#	NAME	POS	ATT	YDS	AVG	LNG	TD
	TOTALS						
	OPPONENTS						

Receiving statistics
#	NAME	POS	REC	YDS	AVG	LNG	TD
	TOTALS						
	OPPONENTS						

==== Defense ====
Defensive statistics
#	NAME	POS	SOLO	AST	CMB	TFL	SCK	INT	PD	FF	FR	TD
	TOTALS		0	0	0	0.0	0.0	0	0	0	0	0
	OPPONENTS		0	0	0	0.0	0.0	0	0	0	0	0

==== Special teams ====
Kicking statistics
#	NAME	POS	XPM	XPA	XP%	FGM	FGA	FG%	LNG
	OPPONENTS								

Punting statistics
#	NAME	POS	PUNTS	YDS	AVG	LNG	BLK	TB	I–20
	TOTALS								
	OPPONENTS								

Kick return statistics
#	NAME	POS	RET	YDS	AVG	LNG	TD
	TOTALS						
	OPPONENTS						

Punt return statistics
#	NAME	POS	RET	YDS	AVG	LNG	TD
	TOTALS						
	OPPONENTS						
