= Leonard Blussé =

Dutch historian (born 1946)

Leonard Blussé J. Leonard Blussé van Oud-Alblas
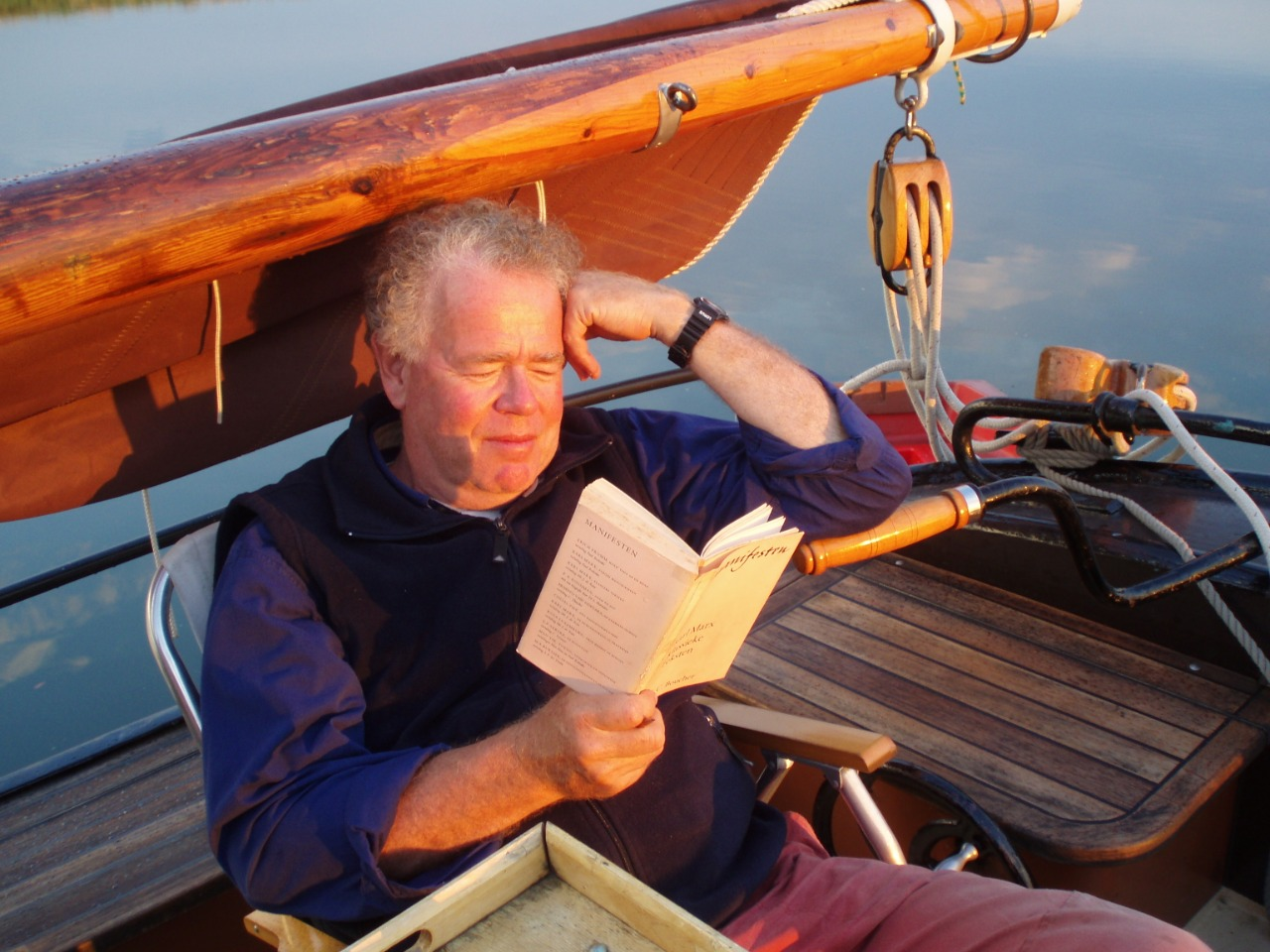
- Born: 23 July 1946 (age 80); Rotterdam, Netherlands
- Education: Leiden University
- Scientific career
- Fields: East Asian History; Southeast Asian History; Asian-European Relations; History of the VOC
- Workplaces: Leiden University

Leonard Blussé van Oud Alblas (born 23 July 1946 in Rotterdam) is a Dutch historian concerned with the field of Asian-European relations. Blussé has authored, co-authored or edited more than twenty books since 2000. He is the founder of the journal Itinerario and initiated the Crayenborgh College guest lecture series which was the first honours class in a Dutch University. He was elected a member of Academia Europaea in 2010.

== Biography ==
=== Education ===
Blussé studied sinology at Leiden University (1965-1973), anthropology at the National Taiwan University (1970-1972) and history at Kyoto University (1972-1975). He obtained his doctorate from Leiden University in 1986.

=== Academic career ===
Blussé worked at Leiden University from 1975 until his retirement in 2011. He started as research coordinator at the Department of Indonesian Studies, became assistant professor in 1987 and Professor of History of European-Asian Relations in 1998.

Blussé was visiting researcher at Tokyo University (1981), and Princeton University (1991–92). He was professor of Southeast Asian History at Xiamen University from 1999-2011, Erasmus Professor of Southeast Asian History at Harvard University in 2005-2006, and Visiting Professor at Kyoto University in 2012-2013.

== Academic activities ==
=== Itinerario journal ===
Blussé started the Itinerario academic journal in 1976 together with George Winius. It became a platform for scholars of the history of European expansion and reactions to it.

=== Crayenborgh College guest lecture series ===
Together with Wim van den Doel, Blussé initiated the Crayenborgh College guest lecture series as the Honours Class of the Master´s programme of the history department at Leiden University in the Netherlands. The Crayenborgh series started in the 1993–1994 academic year. The concept was based on the Friday morning seminars of the Davis Center, Princeton University. Twelve high-performing students were selected to participate in twelve lectures given by world renowned historians. The Crayenborgh was the first honours programme in the Netherlands.

Among the guest lecturers and students of Crayenborgh College were Liah Greenfeld,Frank Dikötter,Stephen K. Sanderson,Norman Housley, Eric Hobsbawm, Lisa Jardine, Felipe Fernandez-Armesto, Jürgen Osterhammel and Chris Bayly.

== Awards ==
- Gouden Uil (1998)
- Linschoten-Vereeniging Medal (2005)
- Knight in the Order of Orange-Nassau (2006)
- Member of Academia Europaea (2011)
- National Special Book Award of China (2016)
- Fukuoka Prize (2019)
- Shortlisted for Libris Prize (2023)

== Selected bibliography ==
- Visible Cities: Canton, Nagasaki and Batavia and the Coming of the Americans. Harvard University Press. 2008. The 2006 Edwin O. Reischauer Lectures.
- Shiba shiji-mo Badaweiya Tangrenshehui (The Chinese Community of Batavia at the End of the Eighteenth Century (in Chinese). Xiamen: Xiamen University Press. 2002.
- Bitter Bonds, A Colonial Divorce Drama of the Seventeenth Century. Princeton: Markus Wiener. 2002.
- Retour Amoy, Anny Tan – Een vrouwenleven in Indonesië, Nederland en China (in Dutch). Amsterdam: Balans.
- Ba-da-wei-ya hua-ren yu Zhong-he maoyi (The Chinese of Batavia and Sino-Dutch trade) (in Chinese). Guangxi People's Publishing Company. 1997.
- Zhong-he jiaowang shi (A History of Sino-Dutch Relations) (in Chinese). Amsterdam: Otto Cramwinckel. 1989.
- Strange Company, Chinese Settlers, Mestizo Women and the Dutch in VOC Batavia. Dordrecht: Foris. 1986.
- De Chinezen Moord: De kolonisatie van Batavia en het bloedbad van 1740. Amsterdam: Uitgeverij Balans. 2023.
