= Carlos A. Rodriguez =

Cuban-American business executive (born 1965)

Personal details
- Education: Harvard College Harvard Business School

Carlos A. Rodriguez (born 1965) is a Cuban-American business executive. He has served as the chief executive officer and president of Automatic Data Processing, Inc. (ADP) since November 2011. Rodriguez has worked for ADP since 1999, when the firm acquired Vincam.

He serves on the boards of ADP, Hubbell Inc. and Microsoft. He is a member of World 50, the Business Roundtable, and the Economic Club of New York. He sits on the board of directors of the A-T Children's Project.

Rodriguez graduated from Christopher Columbus High School (Miami-Dade County) in 1982 and went on to receive a Bachelor of Arts and a Master of Business Administration degree from Harvard University.
