= Alberto Mendoza =

American football player (born 2006)

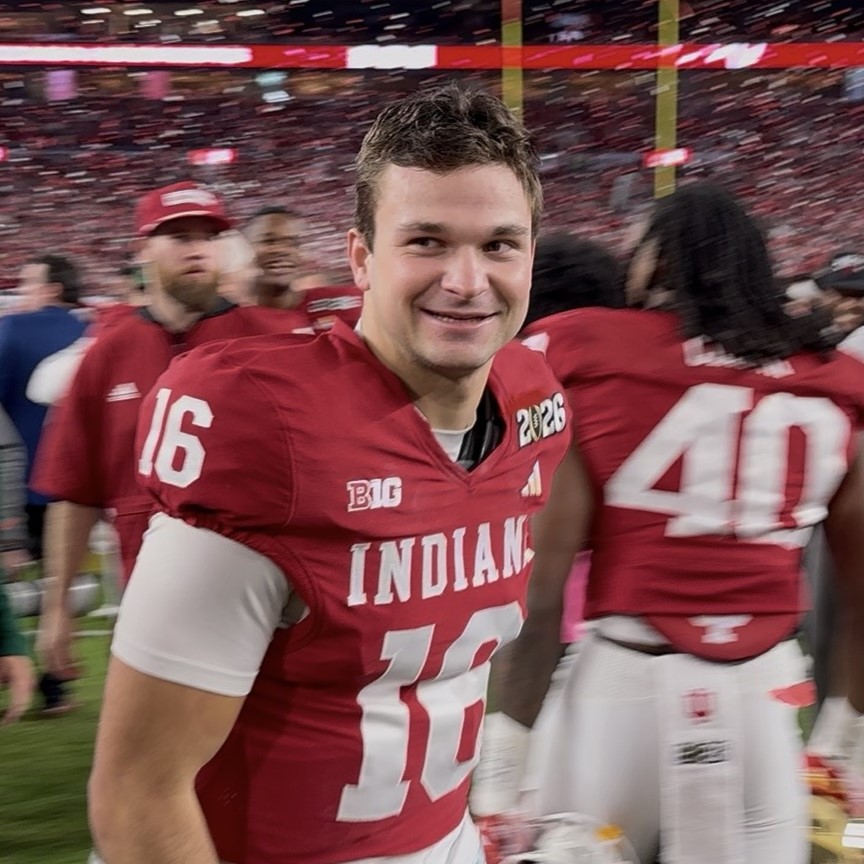
- Mendoza with the Indiana Hoosiers in 2026

No. 15 – Georgia Tech Yellow Jackets
- Position: Quarterback
- Class: Junior

Personal information
- Born: June 6, 2006 (age 20)
- Listed height: 6 ft 2 in (1.88 m)
- Listed weight: 210 lb (95 kg)

Career information
- High school: Christopher Columbus (Miami, Florida)
- College: Indiana (2024–2025); Georgia Tech (2026–present)

Awards and highlights
- CFP national champion (2025)
- Stats at ESPN

Alberto Mendoza (born June 6, 2006) is an American college football quarterback for the Georgia Tech Yellow Jackets. He previously played for the Indiana Hoosiers. He is the younger brother of Heisman Trophy winner and Las Vegas Raiders quarterback Fernando Mendoza.

== Early life ==
Mendoza attended Christopher Columbus High School in Westchester, Florida. He finished his high school career throwing for 4,596 yards, 57 touchdowns, and 12 interceptions, leading Christopher Columbus to back-to-back state championships in 2022 and 2023. Mendoza initially committed to play college football at James Madison University but flipped his commitment to Indiana University Bloomington, following head coach Curt Cignetti.

== College career ==
Mendoza played sparingly in 2024. He entered the 2025 season as the backup to his brother, Fernando. Mendoza threw his first career touchdown pass against Kennesaw State, a six-yard pass to Charlie Becker. He finished the season completing 18 passes for 286 yards and five touchdowns. Mendoza entered the transfer portal following the conclusion of the season.

On January 20, 2026, Mendoza announced his decision to transfer to Georgia Tech.

=== Statistics ===
| Season | Team | Games | | | Passing | | | | | | | | Rushing | | | |
| Season | Team | GP | GS | Record | Cmp | Att | Pct | Yds | Y/A | TD | Int | Rtg | Att | Yds | Avg | TD |
|---|---|---|---|---|---|---|---|---|---|---|---|---|---|---|---|---|
| 2024 | Indiana | 1 | 0 | — | 1 | 1 | 100.0 | 6 | 6.0 | 0 | 0 | 150.4 | 2 | -3 | -1.5 | 0 |
| 2025 | Indiana | 9 | 0 | — | 18 | 24 | 75.0 | 286 | 11.9 | 5 | 1 | 235.5 | 13 | 190 | 14.6 | 1 |
| 2026 | Georgia Tech | 10 | 10 | 3–7 | 190 | 279 | 68.1 | 2,081 | 7.5 | 11 | 7 | 139.1 | 48 | -52 | -1.1 | 0 |
| Career | | 20 | 10 | 3−7 | 209 | 304 | 68.8 | 2,373 | 7.8 | 16 | 8 | 146.4 | 63 | 135 | 2.1 | 1 |
