= DeAndre Moore Jr. =

American football player (born 2004)

No. 3 – Colorado Buffaloes
- Position: Wide receiver
- Class: Senior

Personal information
- Born: March 13, 2004 (age 22)
- Listed height: 6 ft 0 in (1.83 m)
- Listed weight: 190 lb (86 kg)

Career information
- High school: St. John Bosco (Bellflower, California)
- College: Texas (2023–2025); Colorado (2026–present)
- Stats at ESPN

DeAndre Moore Jr. (born March 13, 2004) is an American college football wide receiver for the Colorado Buffaloes. He previously played for the Texas Longhorns.

== Early life ==
Moore began his high school career at Desert Pines High School in Las Vegas. Following his sophomore year, in which no football was played due to the COVID-19 pandemic, Moore transferred to his hometown Los Alamitos High School. For his senior season, Moore transferred once more, this time to St. John Bosco High School in Bellflower, California. At Bosco, he notched 483 receiving yards and eight touchdowns, along with one score on the ground. Coming out of high school, Moore was rated as a four-star recruit, the 8th-best player in California, and the 17th overall wide receiver in the class of 2023. He initially committed to play college football for the Oklahoma Sooners over offers from schools such as Alabama, Florida State, Louisville, Texas, Oregon, and USC. Moore changed his commitment to play for the Louisville Cardinals before flipping his commitment once again to sign with Texas Longhorns.

== College career ==
=== Texas ===
As a freshman in 2023, Moore appeared in 9 games for the Longhorns where he returned one kickoff for 15 yards.

In the first game of his sophomore season against UTSA, Moore scored his first college career touchdown, a 19-yard reception from Manning. In week 5, he hauled in four receptions for 103 yards and two touchdowns in a win over Mississippi State. In the 2024 SEC Championship game, Moore logged nine receptions for 114 yards and one touchdown. In the 2025 Peach Bowl against Arizona State, Moore caught two passes for 25 yards and one touchdown. He played in all 16 games and had a total of 456 yards and seven touchdowns.

Prior to his junior season, Moore was named to the Earl Campbell Tyler Rose Award watch list. In the season opener against Ohio State, Moore logged two receptions for six yards. In Week 2, Moore sustained a concussion in the win against San Jose State and did not play in Week 3 against Sam Houston. In the Red River Rivalry game against Oklahoma, Moore had three receptions for 50 yards and one touchdown. In Week 13 against Arkansas, he had three receptions for 74 yards and three touchdowns. On December 22, Moore announced that he intended to enter the transfer portal.

=== Colorado ===
On January 13, 2026, Moore committed to Colorado.

=== College statistics ===
Year	Team	Games	Receiving				Kick returns		
Year	Team	Games	Rec	Yds	Avg	TD	Ret	Yds	TD
2023	Texas	9	0	0	0.0	0	1	15	0
2024	Texas	16	39	456	11.7	7	0	0	0
2025	Texas	11	38	532	14.0	4	1	11	0
2026	Colorado	2	8	144	18.0	1	0	0	0
Career		38	85	1,132	13.3	12	2	26	0
