= Honours Class =

An Honours Class or Honours Programme is a type of extracurricular programme offered at many Dutch institutions of higher learning. Honours Classes are usually highly selective, admitting only small groups of students with high grades and good motivation. The oldest Honours Class in the Netherlands is the Crayenborgh College, which started in 1993 and is still conducted annually at Leiden University.
