= Westminster Christian School =

Westminster Christian School may refer to:

- Westminster Christian School (Florida)
- Westminster Christian School (Elgin, Illinois)
