= Julian Lewis (American football) =

American football player (born 2007)

No. 10 – Colorado Buffaloes
- Position: Quarterback
- Class: Sophomore

Personal information
- Born: September 21, 2007 (age 19)
- Listed height: 6 ft 1 in (1.85 m)
- Listed weight: 190 lb (86 kg)

Career information
- High school: Carrollton (Carrollton, Georgia)
- College: Colorado (2025–present)
- Stats at ESPN

Julian "JuJu" Lewis (born September 21, 2007) is an American college football quarterback for the Colorado Buffaloes. A five-star recruit out of Carrollton High School in Carrollton, Georgia, he was one of the top-ranked recruits for the college football recruiting class of 2025.

== Early life ==
Lewis was born on September 21, 2007, and is one of five children. His father, T. C., spent time on the UConn Huskies football team, while his grandfather, Ty, was a high school football coach. He was able to throw a youth-sized football 25 yards by age seven and began training with Ron Veal, a coach who helped develop Trevor Lawrence and Justin Fields, at age eight.

Lewis "dominated in middle school" for his football team and was named the Georgia state player of the year for his age each year from age 10 onward. He played at Pace Academy before transferring to Carrollton Junior High School in eighth grade, where he won an award as eighth grade national player of the year. He received his first athletic scholarship offers in mid-September 2021 from major schools including Florida and Penn State, and soon after received a large number of other offers from prominent schools.

Lewis immediately became the starting quarterback at Carrollton High School, winning the job as a 14-15-year-old freshman in 2022. He had received more than 15 NCAA Division I scholarship offers prior to playing his first game in high school, and was ranked as the number one 2026 college football recruit by several sources. In his debut, he threw for 288 yards and five touchdowns in a 69–7 win over Gadsden City High School. He ultimately appeared in 15 games and had what Sports Illustrated described as "the most staggering freshman season in Georgia's robust high school football history," throwing for 4,118 yards and 48 touchdowns to 12 interceptions. Despite playing in Georgia's highest classification, he led the Carrollton Trojans, previously unranked, to an undefeated regular season and an appearance in the state championship, where he set the state record with 531 passing yards and threw for five touchdowns in a loss. He completed 65.5 percent of his pass attempts on the season and was named first-team all-state as well as the national freshman of the year by MaxPreps, having placed 12th in state history for single-season passing yards.

By February 2023, Lewis had received 35 college football offers, including from Georgia, Ohio State, Indiana, and USC. Prior to his sophomore season, he announced his commitment to play college football for the USC Trojans, being ranked a four-star recruit (later five-star). In September, he was featured on the cover of Sports Illustrated, becoming the youngest football player in the magazine's history to be on the cover. The magazine noted that he had the potential to earn millions in name, image and likeness (NIL) compensation, but Georgia was one of 19 states not to allow it; nevertheless, he stayed at Carrollton, as his father thought it best for him to be developed in one of the nation's most competitive high school classifications.

Lewis entered his sophomore year as the consensus No. 1 sophomore prospect. He threw for 3,094 yards and 48 touchdowns to only two interceptions, being named the Gatorade Georgia player of the year while helping Carrollton to a 11–2 record; they reached the Class 7A quarterfinals and won the regional title. He was named the national sophomore of the year by MaxPreps and also was named a finalist for Gatorade's national player of the year award. In January 2024, Lewis re-classified to 2025, but still retained his position as the No. 1 prospect for his class on the Rivals.com rankings.

In November 2024, Lewis decommitted from USC. On November 21, 2024, Lewis announced his commitment to play for the Colorado Buffaloes under head coach Deion Sanders.

== College career ==
On December 23, 2024, Lewis enrolled at the University of Colorado at Boulder. He was named as the team's backup quarterback behind Kaidon Salter entering the 2025 season. He began the 2026 season as the starting quarterback before being benched.

=== College statistics ===
| Season | Team | Games | | | Passing | | | | | | | | Rushing | | | |
| Season | Team | GP | GS | Record | Cmp | Att | Pct | Yds | Avg | TD | Int | Rtg | Att | Yds | Avg | TD |
|---|---|---|---|---|---|---|---|---|---|---|---|---|---|---|---|---|
| 2025 | Colorado | 4 | 2 | 0–2 | 52 | 94 | 55.3 | 589 | 6.3 | 4 | 0 | 122.0 | 24 | -35 | -1.5 | 0 |
| 2026 | Colorado | 4 | 4 | 2–2 | 61 | 95 | 64.2 | 733 | 7.7 | 6 | 2 | 145.5 | 15 | -45 | -3.0 | 1 |
| Career | | 8 | 6 | 2–4 | 113 | 189 | 59.8 | 1,322 | 7.0 | 10 | 2 | 133.9 | 39 | -80 | -2.1 | 1 |
