= 2026 Kansas State Wildcats football team =

American college football season

2026 Kansas State Wildcats football
- Conference: Big 12 Conference
- Record: 4–7 (1–7 Big 12)
- Head coach: Collin Klein (1st season)
- Offensive coordinator: Sean Gleeson (1st season)
- Offensive scheme: Pro spread
- Defensive coordinator: Jordan Peterson (1st season)
- Base defense: 3-high safety / odd stack
- Home stadium: Bill Snyder Family Football Stadium

Uniform
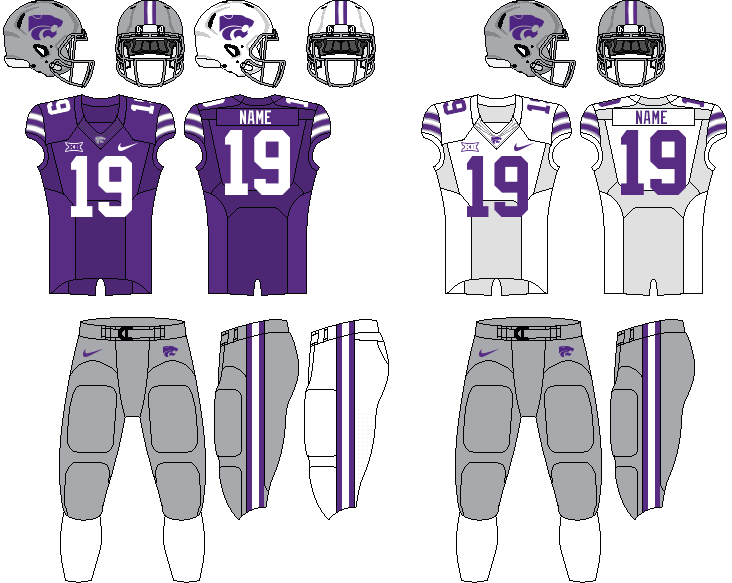

2026 Big 12 Conference football standings
	Conf.			Overall
Team	W		L	W		L
No. 2 Utah y	8	–	0	11	–	0
No. 12 Texas Tech	7	–	1	10	–	1
No. 10 BYU	6	–	2	9	–	2
No. 19 Arizona	5	–	3	8	–	3
No. 20 Houston	5	–	3	8	–	3
Oklahoma State	5	–	3	7	–	4
Baylor	4	–	4	6	–	5
Arizona State	4	–	4	6	–	5
UCF	4	–	4	6	–	5
Iowa State	3	–	5	5	–	6
TCU	3	–	5	5	–	6
Cincinnati	3	–	5	6	–	5
Kansas	2	–	6	4	–	7
West Virginia	2	–	6	5	–	6
Colorado	2	–	6	4	–	7
Kansas State	1	–	7	4	–	7
Championship: TBD vs. Utah
^ – College Football Playoff participant; $ – Conference champion; y – Championship game participant; As of November 22, 2026; Rankings from CFP rankings

The 2026 Kansas State Wildcats football team represents Kansas State University as a member of the Big 12 Conference during the 2026 NCAA Division I FBS football season. They will be led by first year head coach and former Wildcat quarterback Collin Klein. The Wildcats play their home games at Bill Snyder Family Football Stadium which is located in Manhattan, Kansas.

== Schedule ==
Date	Time	Opponent	Site	TV	Result	Attendance
September 5	6:00 p.m.	Nicholls*	Bill Snyder Family Football Stadium; Manhattan, KS	ESPN+	W 71–3	51,719
September 12	11:00 a.m.	Washington State*	Bill Snyder Family Football Stadium; Manhattan, KS	TNT/TruTV	W 34–7	51,759
September 19	11:00 a.m.	Tulane*	Bill Snyder Family Football Stadium; Manhattan, KS	ESPN2	W 31–20	51,846
September 26	6:00 p.m.	at Cincinnati	Nippert Stadium; Cincinnati, OH	ESPN2	L 26–31	37,562
October 10	2:30 p.m.	No. 22 Houston	Bill Snyder Family Football Stadium; Manhattan, KS	FOX	L 16–35	51,569
October 17	11:00 a.m.	Kansas^{†}	Bill Snyder Family Football Stadium; Manhattan, KS (Sunflower Showdown)	FS1	W 35–24	51,961
October 24	2:45 p.m.	at Arizona State	Mountain America Stadium; Tempe, AZ	ESPN2	L 17–28	46,388
October 31	1:00 p.m.	at Colorado	Folsom Field; Boulder, CO (rivalry)	TNT/TruTV	L 24–27 ^{OT}	46,325
November 7	12:00 p.m.	Oklahoma State	Bill Snyder Family Football Stadium; Manhattan, KS	TNT/TruTV	L 28–66	52,134
November 14	1:00 p.m.	at TCU	Amon G. Carter Stadium; Fort Worth, TX	ESPNU	L 10–20	37,203
November 21	6:00 p.m.	No. 19 Arizona	Bill Snyder Family Football Stadium; Manhattan, KS	FS1	L 28–35 ^{OT}	49,807
November 28	1:00 p.m.	at Iowa State	Jack Trice Stadium; Ames, IA (Farmageddon)	ESPN+		
*Non-conference game; ^{†}Homecoming; Rankings from AP Poll (and CFP Rankings, after November 4) - Released prior to game; All times are in Central time

== Game summaries ==
=== Nicholls (FCS) ===
Nicholls Colonels (FCS) (1–0) at Kansas State Wildcats (0–0) – Game summary

Quarter	1	2	3	4	Total
Colonels (FCS)	0	3	0	0	3
Wildcats	22	14	21	14	71

at Bill Snyder Family Football Stadium • Manhattan, Kansas

- Date: September 5
- Game time: 6:00 p.m.
- Game weather: 98 degrees, cloudy, wind SE 8 mph
- Game attendance: 51,719
- Referee: Henry Jones
- TV announcers (ESPN+): Mark Neely and Jeff Woody

Game information

First quarter

- KSU – Jaron Tibbs 7-yard pass from Avery Johnson (Luis Rodriguez kick), 12:36. Wildcats 7–0. Drive: 6 plays, 77 yards, 2:20.
- KSU – Avery Johnson 10-yard run (Linkon Cure run), 6:59. Wildcats 15–0. Drive: 8 plays, 46 yards, 4:04.
- KSU – Brandon White 65-yard punt return (Luis Rodriguez kick), 0:29. Wildcats 22–0.

Second quarter

- KSU – Rodney Fields Jr. 26-yard run (Luis Rodriguez kick), 10:09. Wildcats 29–0. Drive: 6 plays, 65 yards, 3:23.
- NICH – Kingston Phan 32-yard field goal, 5:48. Wildcats 29–3. Drive: 11 plays, 60 yards, 4:21.
- KSU – Joe Jackson 43-yard pass from Avery Johnson (Luis Rodriguez kick), 1:58. Wildcats 36–3. Drive: 8 plays, 77 yards, 3:39.

Third quarter

- KSU – Josh Manning 11-yard pass from Avery Johnson (Robert Hammond III kick), 8:28. Wildcats 43–3. Drive: 8 plays, 62 yards, 3:49.
- KSU – Joe Jackson 11-yard run (Robert Hammond III kick), 5:52. Wildcats 50–3. Drive: 4 plays, 24 yards, 1:59.
- KSU – Jay Harris 11-yard run (Robert Hammond III kick), 2:08. Wildcats 57–3. Drive: 7 plays, 67 yards, 2:20.

Fourth quarter

- KSU – Monterrio Elston Jr. 46-yard run (Robert Hammond III kick), 13:19. Wildcats 64–3. Drive: 4 plays, 62 yards, 2:17.
- KSU – Jacob Knuth 2-yard run (Aidan O'Neill kick), 8:02. Wildcats 71–3. Drive: 7 plays, 57 yards, 3:17.

Statistics	NICH	KSU
First downs	9	34
Plays–yards	58–122	71–559
Rushes–yards	39–92	44–312
Passing yards	30	247
Passing: comp–att–int	7–18–0	20–27–0
Turnovers	1	1
Time of possession	26:17	33:43

Team	Category	Player	Statistics
Nicholls	Passing	Ean Rodrigue	7/19, 30 yards
Nicholls	Rushing	Tamaj Hoffman	9 carries, 43 yards
Nicholls	Receiving	Jordan Smith	2 receptions, 14 yards
Kansas State	Passing	Avery Johnson	15/21, 199 yards, 3 TD
Kansas State	Rushing	Rodney Fields Jr.	14 carries, 103 yards, TD
Kansas State	Receiving	Joe Jackson	2 receptions, 48 yards, TD

=== Washington State ===
Washington State Cougars (0–1) at Kansas State Wildcats (1–0) – Game summary

Quarter	1	2	3	4	Total
Cougars	0	7	0	0	7
Wildcats	3	14	10	7	34

at Bill Snyder Family Football Stadium • Manhattan, Kansas

- Date: September 12
- Game time: 11:00 a.m.
- Game weather: Cloudy • Temperature: 74 °F (23 °C) • Wind: NE 8 mph
- Game attendance: 51,759
- Referee: Preston Clipper
- TV announcers (TNT): J.B. Long, Mike Golic Jr. and Jared Greenberg

Game information

First quarter

- KSU - Luis Rodriguez 31-yard field goal, 6:00. Wildcats 3-0. Drive: 18 plays, 69 yards, 8:56.

Second quarter

- KSU - Josh Manning 6-yard pass from Avery Johnson (Luis Rodriguez kick), 4:23. Wildcats 10-0. Drive: 10 plays, 64 yards, 5:10.
- KSU - Joe Jackson 21-yard pass from Avery Johnson (Luis Rodriguez kick), 1:51. Wildcats 17-0. Drive: 2 plays, 20 yards, 0:18.
- WSU - Jaylen Thomas 47-yard interception return (Jack Stevens kick), 0:10. Wildcats 17-7. Drive: 5 plays, 38 yards, 0:37.

Third quarter

- KSU - Rodney Fields Jr. 75-yard rush (Luis Rodriguez kick), 13:54. Wildcats 24-7. Drive: 1 play, 75 yards, 0:12.
- KSU - Luis Rodriguez 31-yard field goal, 10:21. Wildcats 27-7. Drive: 5 plays, 42 yards, 1:59.

Fourth quarter

- KSU - Brandon White 9-yard pass from Avery Johnson (Luis Rodriguez kick), 13:52. Wildcats 34-7. Drive: 7 plays, 70 yards, 3:00.

Statistics	WSU	KSU
First downs	10	24
Plays–yards	50–166	74–487
Rushes–yards	30–101	40–295
Passing yards	65	192
Passing: comp–att–int	9–20–0	22–34–2
Turnovers	1	2
Time of possession	25:40	34:20

Team	Category	Player	Statistics
Washington State	Passing	Caden Pinnick	9/20, 65 yards
Washington State	Rushing	Kirby Voorhees	11 carries, 45 yards
Washington State	Receiving	Darrius Clemons	3 receptions, 27 yards
Kansas State	Passing	Avery Johnson	22/34, 192 yards, 3 TD, 2 INT
Kansas State	Rushing	Rodney Fields Jr.	13 carries, 105 yards, TD
Kansas State	Receiving	Josh Manning	10 receptions, 97 yards, TD

=== Tulane ===
Tulane Green Wave (1–1) at Kansas State Wildcats (2–0) – Game summary

Quarter	1	2	3	4	Total
Green Wave	7	3	3	7	20
Wildcats	0	17	7	7	31

at Bill Snyder Family Football Stadium • Manhattan, Kansas

- Date: September 19
- Game time: 11:00 a.m.
- Game weather: Sunny • Temperature: 84 °F (29 °C) • Wind: SW 9 mph
- Game attendance: 51,846
- Referee: Tim Rich
- TV announcers (ESPN2): Anish Shroff, Andre Ware and Morgan Uber

Statistics	TULN	KSU
First downs	18	20
Plays–yards	59–260	65–428
Rushes–yards	33–95	37–201
Passing yards	165	227
Passing: comp–att–int	13–26–0	21–28–0
Turnovers	0	0
Time of possession	26:19	33:41

Team	Category	Player	Statistics
Tulane	Passing	Kadin Semonza	13/26, 165 yards, TD
Tulane	Rushing	Johnnie Daniels	10 carries, 59 yards
Tulane	Receiving	Oliver Mitchell Jr.	1 receptions, 41 yards
Kansas State	Passing	Avery Johnson	21/28, 227 yards
Kansas State	Rushing	Avery Johnson	12 carries, 152 yards, 2 TD
Kansas State	Receiving	Jaron Tibbs	9 receptions, 114 yards

=== at Cincinnati ===
Kansas State Wildcats (3–0) at Cincinnati Bearcats (3–0) – Game summary

Quarter	1	2	3	4	Total
Wildcats	3	14	0	9	26
Bearcats	0	10	14	7	31

at Nippert Stadium • Cincinnati, Ohio

- Date: September 26
- Game time: 6:00 p.m.
- Game weather: Sunny • Temperature: 73 °F (23 °C) • Wind: N at 8 miles per hour (13 km/h)
- Game attendance: 37,562
- Referee: Kevin Boitmann
- TV announcers (ESPN2): Chuckie Kempf (play-by-play) and Dustin Fox (analyst)

Game information

First quarter

- KSU – Luis Rodriguez 22-yard field goal, 4:32. Wildcats 3-0. Drive: 16 plays, 88 yards, 7:59.

Second quarter

- KSU – Rodney Fields Jr. 19-yard run (Luis Rodriguez kick), 9:09. Wildcats 10–0. Drive: 5 plays, 69 yards, 2:19.
- CIN – Malachi Henry 39-yard pass from JC French IV (Stephen Rusnak kick), 6:36. Wildcats 10-7. Drive: 5 plays, 88 yards, 2:30.
- CIN – Stephen Rusnak 44-yard field goal, 3:44. Tied 10-10. Drive: 5 plays, 54 yards, 2:02.
- KSU – Derrick Salley Jr. 4-yard pass from Avery Johnson (Luis Rodriguez kick), 0:15. Wildcats 17-10. Drive: 10 plays, 65 yards, 3:29.

Third quarter

- CIN – Cole Tabb 5-yard run (Stephen Rusnak kick), 10:55. Tied 17-17. Drive: 7 plays, 55 yards, 3:49.
- CIN – Cole Tabb 30-yard run (Stephen Rusnak kick), 7:26. Bearcats 24-17. Drive: 3 plays, 36 yards, 1:07.

Fourth quarter

- KSU – Luis Rodriguez 36-yard field goal, 9:30. Bearcats 24-20. Drive: 17 plays, 65 yards, 7:49.
- CIN – Cole Tabb 14-yard run (Stephen Rusnak kick), 3:28. Bearcats 31-20. Drive: 10 plays, 75 yards, 6:02.
- KSU – Rodney Fields Jr. 2-yard run (Derrick Salley Jr. pass from Avery Johnson failed), 1:15. Bearcats 31-26. Drive: 9 plays, 79 yards, 2:11.

Statistics	KSU	CIN
First downs	25	16
Plays–yards	80-447	51-436
Rushes–yards	30-155	38-271
Passing yards	292	165
Passing: comp–att–int	30-50-0	8-13-0
Time of possession	33:18	26:42

Team	Category	Player	Statistics
Kansas State	Passing	Avery Johnson	30-50, 292 yards, 1 TD
Kansas State	Rushing	Joe Jackson	11 attempts, 59 yards, 0 TD
Kansas State	Receiving	Derrick Salley Jr.	7 receptions, 140 yards 1 TD
Cincinnati	Passing	JC French IV	8-13, 165 yards, 1 TD
Cincinnati	Rushing	Gi'Bran Payne	16 attempts, 126 yards, 0 TD
Cincinnati	Receiving	JV Gibson	2 receptions, 66 yards, 0 TD

=== No. 22 Houston ===
No. 22 Houston Cougars (4–1) at Kansas State Wildcats (3–1) – Game summary

Quarter	1	2	3	4	Total
No. 22 Cougars	7	14	14	0	35
Wildcats	3	0	6	7	16

at Bill Snyder Family Football Stadium • Manhattan, Kansas

- Date: October 10
- Game time: 2:30 p.m.
- Game weather: 87 degrees, sunny, wind SW 14 mph
- Game attendance: 51,569
- Referee: Luke Richmond
- TV announcers (FOX): Tim Brando, Devin Gardner, and Josh Sims

Game information
First quarter
- HOU – Patrick Overmyer 1-yard pass from Conner Weigman (Jonathan Dimas kick), 9:20. Cougars 7–0. Drive: 12 plays, 75 yards, 5:40.
- KSU – Luis Rodriguez 29-yard field goal, 0:00. Cougars 7–3. Drive: 10 plays, 69 yards, 3:53.

Second quarter

- HOU – Patrick Overmyer 2-yard pass from Conner Weigman (Jonathan Dimas kick), 9:52. Cougars 14–3. Drive: 12 plays, 75 yards, 5:08.
- HOU – Makhi Hughes 13-yard run (Jonathan Dimas kick), 3:17. Cougars 21–3. Drive: 8 plays, 81 yards, 3:47.

Third quarter

- HOU – Patrick Overmyer 8-yard pass from Conner Weigman (Jonathan Dimas kick), 9:23. Cougars 28–3. Drive: 8 plays, 76 yards, 3:27.
- KSU – Garrett Oakley 13-yard pass from Avery Johnson (pass failed), 6:11. Cougars 28–9. Drive: 6 plays, 64 yards, 3:04.
- HOU – Patrick Overmyer 2-yard pass from Conner Weigman (Jonathan Dimas kick), 0:48. Cougars 35–9. Drive: 10 plays, 67 yards, 5:16.

Fourth quarter

- KSU – Jaron Tibbs 6-yard pass from Avery Johnson (Luis Rodriguez kick), 3:39. Cougars 35–16. Drive: 13 plays, 61 yards, 6:02.

Statistics	HOU	KSU
First downs	26	19
Plays–yards	73-475	59-299
Rushes–yards	43-233	29-117
Passing yards	242	182
Passing: comp–att–int	19-30-0	16-30-1
Time of possession	34:49	25:11

Team	Category	Player	Statistics
Houston	Passing	Conner Weigman	19-30, 242 yards, 4 TD, 0 INT
Houston	Rushing	Re'Shaun Sanford II	20 att, 90 yards, 0 TD
Houston	Receiving	Patrick Overmyer	8 rec, 83 yards, 4 TD
Kansas State	Passing	Avery Johnson	16-30, 182 yards, 2 TD, 1 INT
Kansas State	Rushing	Rodney Fields Jr.	14 att, 46 yards, 0 TD
Kansas State	Receiving	Garrett Oakley	3 rec, 49 yards, 1 TD

=== Kansas (Sunflower Showdown) ===
Kansas Jayhawks (2–3) at Kansas State Wildcats (3–2) – Game summary

Quarter	1	2	3	4	Total
Jayhawks	17	0	7	0	24
Wildcats	7	11	7	10	35

at Bill Snyder Family Football Stadium • Manhattan, Kansas

- Date: October 17
- Game time: 11:00 a.m.
- Game weather: Sunny • Temperature: 49 °F (9 °C) • Wind: S at 7 miles per hour (11 km/h)
- Game attendance: 51,961
- Referee: Michael VanderVelde
- TV announcers (FS1): Eric Collins (play-by-play) and Spencer Tillman (analyst)

Game information
First quarter
- KSU – Rodney Fields Jr. 4-yard run (Luis Rodriguez kick), 13:17. Wildcats 7–0. Drive: 5 plays, 75 yards, 1:43.
- KU – Bryson Hayes 95-yard kickoff return (Martin Connington kick), 13:04. Tied 7–7.
- KU – Nik McMillan 12-yard pass from Isaiah Marshall (Martin Connington kick), 4:21. Jayhawks 14–7. Drive: 13 plays, 88 yards, 5:03.
- KU – Martin Connington 31-yard field goal, 0:51. Jayhawks 17–7. Drive: 5 plays, 14 yards, 2:29.

Second quarter

- KSU – Luis Rodriguez 22-yard field goal, 11:50. Jayhawks 17–10. Drive: 9 plays, 71 yards, 3:56.
- KSU – Luis Rodriguez 51-yard field goal, 6:57. Jayhawks 17–13. Drive: 7 plays, 32 yards, 3:27.
- KSU – Matthew Gill safety, 1:39. Jayhawks 17–15.
- KSU – Luis Rodriguez 28-yard field goal, 0:24. Wildcats 18–17. Drive: 8 plays, 41 yards, 1:09.

Third quarter

- KU – Dylan Edwards 3-yard run (Martin Connington kick), 11:05. Jayhawks 24–18. Drive: 9 plays, 75 yards, 3:55.
- KSU – Joe Jackson 8-yard run (Luis Rodriguez kick), 6:32. Wildcats 25–24. Drive: 9 plays, 65 yards, 4:33.

Fourth quarter

- KSU – Jaron Tibbs 9-yard pass from Avery Johnson (Luis Rodriguez kick), 8:28. Wildcats 32–24. Drive: 4 plays, 84 yards, 1:25.
- KSU – Luis Rodriguez 34-yard field goal, 1:56. Wildcats 35–24. Drive: 11 plays, 63 yards, 5:10.

Statistics	KU	KSU
First downs	18	25
Plays–yards	60–319	75–568
Rushes–yards	34–168	51–359
Passing yards	151	209
Passing: comp–att–int	12–26–1	14–24–0
Time of possession	23:47	36:13

Team	Category	Player	Statistics
Kansas	Passing	Isaiah Marshall	12-26, 151 yards, 1 TD, 1 INT
Kansas	Rushing	Isaiah Marshall	14 att., 117 yards, 0 TD
Kansas	Receiving	Nik McMillan	5 rec., 55 yards, 1 TD
Kansas State	Passing	Avery Johnson	14-24, 209 yards, 1 TD, 0 INT
Kansas State	Rushing	Joe Jackson	27 att., 159 yards, 1 TD
Kansas State	Receiving	Derrick Salley Jr.	2 rec., 70 yards, 0 TD

=== at Arizona State ===
Kansas State Wildcats (4–2) at Arizona State Sun Devils (3–3) – Game summary

Quarter	1	2	3	4	Total
Wildcats	7	3	7	0	17
Sun Devils	7	7	0	14	28

at Mountain America Stadium • Tempe, Arizona

- Date: October 24
- Game time: 2:45 p.m.
- Game weather: 75 degrees, sunny, wind West at 4 mph
- Game attendance: 46,388
- Referee: Tutashinda Salaam
- TV announcers (ESPN2): Jay Alter, Tom Luginbill, and Lauren Sisler

Game information

First quarter

- KSU – Jaron Tibbs 7-yard pass from Jacob Knuth (Luis Rodriguez Kick), 10:38. Kansas State 7–0. Drive: 9 plays, 65 yards, 4:22.
- ASU – Cardae Mack 9-yard run (Carson Smith Kick), 9:48. Tied 7–7. Drive: 4 plays, 77 yards, 0:50.

Second quarter

- ASU – Cardae Mack 1-yard run (Carson Smith Kick), 14:16. Arizona State 14–7. Drive: 9 plays, 55 yards, 3:10.
- KSU – Luis Rodriguez 22-yard field goal, 5:47. Arizona State 14–10. Drive: 7 plays, 47 yards, 3:25.

Third quarter

- KSU – Jacob Knuth 20-yard run (Luis Rodriguez Kick), 7:59. Kansas State 17–14. Drive: 4 plays, 21 yards, 3:02.

Fourth quarter

- ASU – Cardae Mack 12-yard run (Carson Smith Kick), 14:55. Arizona State 21–17. Drive: 7 plays, 71 yards, 3:02.
- ASU – Cardae Mack 11-yard run (Carson Smith Kick), 6:23. Arizona State 28–17. Drive: 7 plays, 65 yards, 2:30.

Statistics	KSU	ASU
First downs	18	19
Plays–yards	73-278	71-359
Rushes–yards	32-84	40-147
Passing yards	194	212
Passing: comp–att–int	26-41-0	14-31-0
Time of possession	33:10	26:50

Team	Category	Player	Statistics
Kansas State	Passing	Jacob Knuth	26-41, 194 yards, 1 TD
Kansas State	Rushing	Rodney Fields, Jr.	10 att., 36 yards, 0 TD
Kansas State	Receiving	Jaron Tibbs	9 catches, 57 yards, 1 TD
Arizona State	Passing	Mikey Keene	10-20, 160 yards, 0 TD
Arizona State	Rushing	Cardae Mack	26 att., 159 yards, 4 TD
Arizona State	Receiving	Reed Harris	6 catches, 147 yards, 0 TD

=== at Colorado (rivalry) ===
Kansas State Wildcats (4–3) at Colorado Buffaloes (2–5) – Game summary

Quarter	1	2	3	4	OT	Total
Wildcats	0	7	7	7	3	24
Buffaloes	7	0	7	7	6	27

at Folsom Field • Boulder, Colorado

- Date: October 31
- Game time: 1:00 p.m.
- Game weather: 55 degrees, sunny, wind N 3 mph
- Game attendance: 46,325
- Referee: Kevin Boitmann
- TV announcers (TNT/HBO Max): J.B. Long, Mike Golic Jr., and Jared Greenberg

Game information

First quarter

- (1:42) COLO – Richard Young 2-yard run, Elliot Arnold kick (Drive: 6 plays, 60 yards, 2:50; Colorado 7–0)

Second quarter

- (2:25) KSU – Josh Manning 28-yard pass from Blake Barnett, Luis Rodriguez kick (Drive: 11 plays, 80 yards, 7:07; Tied 7–7)

Third quarter

- (4:35) COLO – JaQuail Smith 47-yard run, Elliot Arnold kick (Drive: 4 plays, 71 yards, 1:33; Colorado 14–7)
- (2:14) KSU – Linkon Cure 33-yard pass from Blake Barnett, Luis Rodriguez kick (Drive: 4 plays, 75 yards, 2:22; Tied 14–14)

Fourth quarter

- (12:27) COLO – Richard Young 22-yard run, Elliot Arnold kick (Drive: 10 plays, 96 yards, 4:44; Colorado 21–14)
- (0:02) KSU – Garrett Oakley 8-yard pass from Blake Barnett, Luis Rodriguez kick (Drive: 6 plays, 62 yards, 0:53; Tied 21–21)

Overtime

- (0:00) KSU – Luis Rodriguez 25-yard field goal (Drive: 7 plays, 18 yards, 0:00; Kansas State 24–21)
- (0:00) COLO – Charlie Williams 11-yard pass from Isaac Wilson (Drive: 5 plays, 25 yards, 0:00; Colorado 27–24)

Statistics	KSU	COLO
First downs	19	19
Plays–yards	69-347	64-407
Rushes–yards	39-121	43-222
Passing yards	226	185
Passing: comp–att–int	19-30-0	14-21-0
Time of possession	31:56	28:04

Team	Category	Player	Statistics
Kansas State	Passing	Blake Barnett	18-28, 224 yards, 3 TD, 0 INT
Kansas State	Rushing	Rodney Fields, Jr.	12 att, 65 yards 0 TD
Kansas State	Receiving	Josh Manning	6 rec., 73 yards, 1 TD
Colorado	Passing	Isaac Wilson	14-21, 185 yards, 1 TD, 0 INT
Colorado	Rushing	Richard Young	24 att, 120 yards, 2 TD
Colorado	Receiving	Joseph Williams	5 rec., 89 yards 0 TD

=== Oklahoma State ===
Oklahoma State Cowboys (5–3) at Kansas State Wildcats (4–4) – Game summary

Quarter	1	2	3	4	Total
Cowboys	28	21	14	3	66
Wildcats	7	7	7	7	28

at Bill Snyder Family Football Stadium • Manhattan, Kansas

- Date: November 7
- Game time: 12:00 p.m.
- Game weather: Cloudy • Temperature: 47 °F (8 °C) • Wind: SW at 5 miles per hour (8.0 km/h)
- Game attendance: 52,134
- Referee: Kevin Boitmann
- TV announcers (TNT): J.B. Long, Mike Golic, Jr., and Jared Greenberg

Game information

First Quarter

- (12:21) OSU ― Justin Bowick 32 yard pass from Drew Mestemaker, Sam Keltner kick (Drive: 3 plays, 72 yards, 0:56; OSU 7―0)
- (11:18) KSU ― Derrick Salley Jr. 73 yard pass from Blake Barnett, Luis Rodriguez kick (Drive: 3 plays, 77 yards, 1:03; Tied 7―7)
- (8:24) OSU ― Caleb Hawkins 21 yard rush, Sam Keltner kick (Drive: 7 plays, 75 yards, 2:54; OSU 14―7)
- (5:00) OSU ― Caleb Hawkins 37 yard rush, Sam Keltner kick (Drive: 3 plays, 64 yards, 0:50; OSU 21―7)
- (0:50) OSU ― Morgan McPhaul 3 yard pass from Drew Mestemaker, Sam Keltner kick (Drive: 3 plays, 13 yards, 1:21; OSU 28―7)

Second Quarter

- (10:37) KSU ― Lorgan Bartley 18 yard INT Return, Luis Rodriquez kick (Drive: 1 play, 0 yards, 0:08; OSU 28―14)
- (8:26) OSU ― Drew Mestemaker 1 yard rush, Sam Keltner kick (Drive: 5 plays, 43 yards, 2:11; OSU 35―14)
- (3:22) OSU ― Caleb Hawkins 9 yard rush, Sam Keltner kick (Drive: 3 plays, 17 yards, 1:02; OSU 42―14)
- (0:11) OSU ― Miles Coleman 19 yard pass from Drew Mestemaker, Sam Keltner kick (Drive: 6 plays, 86 yards, 1:26; OSU 49―14)

Third Quarter

- (9:27) KSU ― Derrick Salley Jr. 18 yard pass from Dillon Duff, Luis Rodriquez (Drive: 8 plays, 45 yards, 4:04; OSU 49―21)
- (6:25) OSU ― Caleb Hawkins 5 yard pass from Drew Mestemaker, Sam Keltner kick (Drive: 7 plays, 68 yards, 2:58; OSU 56―21)
- (3:29) OSU ― Drew Mestemaker 5 yard pass from Wyatt Young, Sam Keltner kick (Drive: 4 plays, 29 yards, 2:06; OSU 63―21)

Fourth Quarter

- (10:55) KSU ― Rodney Fields Jr. 1 yard rush, Luis Rodriguez kick (Drive: 15 plays, 66 yards, 7:25; OSU 63―28)
- (4:20) OSU ― Sam Keltner 23 yard field goal (Drive: 10 plays, 70 yards, 6:35; OSU 66―28)

Statistics	OKST	KSU
First downs	26	16
Plays–yards	64-565	73-327
Rushes–yards	34-223	39-127
Passing yards	342	200
Passing: comp–att–int	24-30-1	17-34-3
Time of possession	27:42	32:18

Team	Category	Player	Statistics
Oklahoma State	Passing	Drew Mestemaker	22/28, 313 yards, 4 TD, INT
Oklahoma State	Rushing	Caleb Hawkins	20 carries, 175 yards, 3 TD
Oklahoma State	Receiving	Miles Coleman	6 receptions, 95 yards, TD
Kansas State	Passing	Blake Barnett	7/17, 106 yards, TD, 2 INT
Kansas State	Rushing	Rodney Fields Jr.	20 carries, 87 yards, TD
Kansas State	Receiving	Derrick Salley Jr.	3 receptions, 100 yards, 2 TD

=== at TCU ===
Kansas State Wildcats (4–5) at TCU Horned Frogs (4–5) – Game summary

Quarter	1	2	3	4	Total
Wildcats	0	0	10	0	10
Horned Frogs	7	3	7	3	20

at Amon G. Carter Stadium • Fort Worth, Texas

- Date: November 14
- Game time: 1:00 p.m.
- Game weather: 62 degrees, Cloudy. Wind SE at 13 mph
- Game attendance: 37,203
- Referee: Mark Vandervelde
- TV announcers (ESPNU): James Westling and Leger Douzable

Statistics	KSU	TCU
First downs	17	18
Plays–yards	58-302	69-324
Rushes–yards	25-58	35-99
Passing yards	244	225
Passing: comp–att–int	22-33-0	20-34-0
Time of possession	28:05	31:55

Team	Category	Player	Statistics
Kansas State	Passing	Dillon Duff	22-33, 1 TD, 0 INT
Kansas State	Rushing	Joe Jackson	5 att, 33 yards, 0 TD
Kansas State	Receiving	Jaron Tibbs	8 catches, 115 yards, 1 TD
TCU	Passing	Jaden Craig	20-34, 225 yards, 1 TD, 0 INT
TCU	Rushing	Jeremy Payne	15 att, 55 yards, 0 TD
TCU	Receiving	Jordan Dwyer	5 catches, 85 yards, 0 TD

=== No. 19 Arizona ===
No. 19 Arizona Wildcats (7–3) at Kansas State Wildcats (4–6) – Game summary

Quarter	1	2	Total
No. 19 Wildcats			0
Wildcats			0

at Bill Snyder Family Football Stadium • Manhattan, Kansas

- Date: November 21
- Game time: 6:00 p.m.
- TV announcers (FS1): Eric Collins and Spencer Tillman

Statistics	ARIZ	KSU
First downs		
Plays–yards		
Rushes–yards		
Passing yards		
Passing: comp–att–int		
Time of possession		

Team	Category	Player	Statistics
Arizona	Passing		
Arizona	Rushing		
Arizona	Receiving		
Kansas State	Passing		
Kansas State	Rushing		
Kansas State	Receiving		

=== at Iowa State ===
Kansas State Wildcats (0–0) at Iowa State Cyclones (0–0) – Game summary

Quarter	1	2	Total
Wildcats			0
Cyclones			0

at Jack Trice Stadium • Ames, Iowa

- Date: November 28
- Game time: 1:00 p.m.
- TV: ESPN+

Statistics	KSU	ISU
First downs		
Plays–yards		
Rushes–yards		
Passing yards		
Passing: comp–att–int		
Time of possession		

Team	Category	Player	Statistics
Kansas State	Passing		
Kansas State	Rushing		
Kansas State	Receiving		
Iowa State	Passing		
Iowa State	Rushing		
Iowa State	Receiving		

== Personnel ==
=== Coaching staff ===
Name	Position	Year at Kansas State	Previous job
Collin Klein	Head coach	1st	Texas A&M (OC)
Thad Ward	AHC/WR	1st	Illinois AHC/RB)
Sean Gleeson	OC	1st	Missouri (QB)
Jordan Peterson	DC/DB	1st	Texas A&M (co-DC/DB)
Stanton Weber	ST	1st	Toledo (ST)
Marcus Woodson	co-DC/DB	1st	Arkansas (co-DC/DB)
Christian Ellsworth	QB	1st	Texas A&M (TE)
Jeremiah Johnson	DB	1st	Coastal Carolina (DB)
Brian Lepak	TE	6th	Kansas State (OL)
Cory Patterson	RB	1st	Oklahoma State (RB)
Mike Schmidt	OL	1st	San Diego State (RGC/OL)
Nick Toth	LB	1st	Air Force (S)
Buddy Wyatt	DL	8th	Kansas State (DE)
Josh Buford	IWR	1st	Texas A&M (AQB)
Tim DeRuyter	AHC-D	1st	Texas Tech (DC)
Jordan Dove	DT	1st	South Carolina (DA)
Preston Mason	OLB	1st	Texas A&M (ALB)
Matt Kardulis	AS	6th	K-State (AS)
Drew Liddle	AOL	3rd	K-State (AOL)
Sean Maguire	AQB	1st	Texas A&M (ALB)
Scotty Ohara	ARB	1st	Texas A&M (OQC/AWR)
D'Mitri Emmanuel	OL Analyst	1st	Florida State (OL Analyst)
Andrew Fowler	STQC	1st	Toledo (STQC)
Armani Linton	DA	1st	Arkansas (ADB/NB)
Jeremy Jacobs	S&C	1st	Texas A&M (AS&C)

=== Roster ===
2026 roster
Quarterbacks: 2 Avery Johnson – Sr.; 3 Blake Barnett – So.; 7 Jacob Knuth – Sr.; 10 Dillon Duff – (redshirt) Fr.; Running backs: 4 Joe Jackson – Jr.; 9 Jay Harris – Sr.; 20 Rodney Fields Jr. - So.; 22 Makari Bodiford - So.; 24 Tanner West - Fr.; 31 Monterrio Elston Jr. - (redshirt) Fr.; Wide receivers: 1 Izaiah Williams - So.; 5 Josh Manning - Sr.; 6 Sterling Lockett – Jr.; 9 Brandon White - Sr.; 12 Jaron Tibbs – Sr.; 13 Kaprice Keith – Fr.; 14 Max Lovett - Fr.; 15 Derrick Salley Jr. - Jr.; 16 Julius Wilson - Fr.; 17 Adonis Moise – So.; 18 Larry Porter IV – (redshirt) Fr.; 21 Bryce Noernberg – So.; 27 Ben Wheeler – So.; 82 Justin Stephens – Jr.; 84 Isaac Koch – Sr.; Tight ends: 0 Linkon Cure – So.; 80 Will Anciaux – Jr.; 86 Garrett Oakley – Sr.	Offensive line: 50 Brock Heath – (redshirt) Fr.; 53 Lamarcus Barber – Fr.; 54 Keiton Jones – (redshirt) Fr.; 55 Kyle Rakers – So.; 57 Delvin Morris – Jr.; 59 George Fitzpatrick – Sr.; 60 Keegan Collins - Fr.; 61 Chase Duarte - So.; 62 Jordan Jensen - Jr.; 65 Tyler Johnson - Jr.; 66 Michael Capria – Sr.; 68 Joe Vickers – Jr.; 70 Gus Hawkins – So.; 71 Dylan Villaroul – (redshirt) Fr.; 72 Ryan Howard - So.; 73 Oliver Miller - Fr.; 74 Navarro Schunke – So.; 77 Tanner Morley – Jr.; 78 John Pastore – Sr.; 79 Charlie Adams – Jr.; Long snappers: 33 Andrew Johnson – Jr.; 45 Jaxson Duffield - (redshirt) Fr.; Defensive ends: 1 Wendell Gregory – So.; 19 Jayden Bryant – So.; 30 Dalton Knapp - (redshirt) Fr.; 39 Travis Bates – Sr.; 56 Elijah Hill – So.; 90 Brad Stanyer – (redshirt) Fr.; 91 Jordan Allen – Jr.; 92 Tucker Ashford – Fr.; Defensive Tackles: 15 Kamari Burns – Jr.; 75 Holden Bass – So.; 76 Austin Ramsey – Jr.; 88 De'Arieun Hicks - So.; 95 Patrick Tackie – Jr.; 99 Adrian Bekibele – Fr.	Linebackers: 4 Mekhi Mason – Sr.; 6 Darien Whitaker Jr. – (redshirt) Fr.; 16 DJ Ackerson Jr. - Fr.; 20 Jacobi Oliphant Jr. - So.; 23 Asa Newsom – Jr.; 26 Sawyer Schilke – (redshirt) Fr.; 28 Rex Van Wyhe – Sr.; 35 Gabe Powers – Sr.; 41 Ashton Moore – (redshirt) Fr.; 44 Weston Polk - So.; Cornerbacks: 3 Ja'Son Prevard - Sr.; 7 Kaleb Patterson – Jr.; 9 Donovan McIntosh- Jr.; 12 Serious Stinyard – (redshirt) Fr.; 21 JoJo Scott – (redshirt) Fr.; 24 Martel Jackson – (redshirt) Fr.; 25 Zashon Rich – Jr.; 29 Josiah Vilmael – Fr.; 32. Garrick Dixon - Fr.; Safeties: 0 Koy Beasley - So.; 2 Adrian Maddox - Sr.; 5 Michael Graham Jr. – Jr.; 10 Logan Bartley – So.; 13 RJ Collins – (redshirt) Fr.; 14 Jet Dineen – Sr.; 17 Mikey Bergeron – Jr.; 18 Wesley Fair – Jr.; 22 Jace Adler – (redshirt) Fr.; 31 Dominic Mitchell – (redshirt) Fr.; 34 Nick McClellan - Fr.; 36 Jack Fabris – Jr.; Punters/kickers: 8 Simon McClannan – Jr.; 27 Cub Patton – (redshirt) Fr.; 29 Dylan Davidson - So.; 37 Robert Hammond Jr. - Jr.; 43 Luis Rodriguez - Jr.

=== Transfers ===
==== Outgoing transfers ====
Kansas State Outgoing transfers
Name	Pos.	College transferred to
Terrence Enos Jr.	OT	?
Jayshawn Ross	DE	Missouri Southern
Jayden Rowe	CB	Baylor
DeVon Rice	RB	Hawaii
Maguire Richman	LB	Northwest Missouri
Will Kemna	OT	Missouri
Asher Tomaszewski	DL	Adams State
Kaedin Massey	OT	James Madison
Amos Talalele	OL	UAB
Jake Clifton	LB	BYU
Qua Moss	S	Tennessee
Antonio Martin Jr.	RB	Middle Tennessee
Daniel Cobbs	S	Baylor
Chiddi Obiazor	DE	Indiana
Malcolm Alcorn-Crowder	DL	SMU
Kanijal Thomas	CB	Oklahoma State
Austin Romaine	LB	Texas Tech
Ralph Ortiz	LB	Tennessee Tech
Tobi Osunsanmi	DE	Indiana
Devin Vass	OL	West Virginia
Ryan Davis	DE	Baylor
Jayce Brown	WR	LSU
Colby McCalister	S	Baylor
Callen Barta	WR	Emporia State
Jacques Spradley-Demps	WR	Kilgore College
Amarion Fortenberry	CB	South Florida
Brayden Loftin	TE	UCLA
Andrew Metzger	TE	Ohio
Jemyri Davis	WR	Memphis
Truman Griffith	DE	North Dakota State
JB Price	RB	Hutchinson CC
Dylan Edwards	RB	Kansas

==== Incoming transfers ====
Kansas State Incoming transfers
Name	Pos.	Previous school
Elijah Hill	DE	Kennesaw State
Tyler Johnson	OT	Auburn
Chase Duarte	OL	San Diego State
Adrian Maddox	OT	Georgia
Jay Harris	RB	Oregon
Brandon White	WR	Hawaii
Jaxson Duffield	LS	Oklahoma State
Robert Hammond III	K	Toledo
Izaiah Williams	WR	Texas A&M
Delvin Morris	OL	Akron
Rodney Fields Jr.	RB	Oklahoma State
Jayden Bryant	DE	Coastal Carolina
Jacobi Oliphant Jr.	LB	Oklahoma State
Koy Beasley	S	Miami
De'Arieun Hicks	DL	Gardner-Webb
Kaleb Patterson	CB	Illinois
Keiton Jones	OL	Missouri
Austin Ramsey	DL	Kentucky
Makari Bodiford	RB	Memphis
Wendell Gregory	DE	Oklahoma State
Joshua Manning	WR	Missouri
Tanner Morley	WR	Colorado State
Ja'son Prevard	CB	Virginia
Mekhi Mason	LB	Louisiana Tech
Kamari Burns	DL	Cincinnati
Austin Ramsey	DL	Kentucky
Charlie Adams	OT	Cal Poly
Dylan Davidson	P	Emporia State

- Source
