= 2026 Houston Cougars football team =

American college football season

2026 Houston Cougars football
- Conference: Big 12 Conference

Ranking
- Coaches: No. 17
- AP: No. 17
- CFP: No. 20
- Record: 8–3 (5–3 Big 12)
- Head coach: Willie Fritz (3rd season)
- Offensive coordinator: Slade Nagle (2nd season)
- Defensive coordinator: Austin Armstrong (2nd season)
- Home stadium: TDECU Stadium

2026 Big 12 Conference football standings
	Conf.			Overall
Team	W		L	W		L
No. 2 Utah y	8	–	0	11	–	0
No. 12 Texas Tech	7	–	1	10	–	1
No. 10 BYU	6	–	2	9	–	2
No. 19 Arizona	5	–	3	8	–	3
No. 20 Houston	5	–	3	8	–	3
Oklahoma State	5	–	3	7	–	4
Baylor	4	–	4	6	–	5
Arizona State	4	–	4	6	–	5
UCF	4	–	4	6	–	5
Iowa State	3	–	5	5	–	6
TCU	3	–	5	5	–	6
Cincinnati	3	–	5	6	–	5
Kansas	2	–	6	4	–	7
West Virginia	2	–	6	5	–	6
Colorado	2	–	6	4	–	7
Kansas State	1	–	7	4	–	7
Championship: TBD vs. Utah
^ – College Football Playoff participant; $ – Conference champion; y – Championship game participant; As of November 22, 2026; Rankings from CFP rankings

The 2026 Houston Cougars football team represent the University of Houston during the 2026 NCAA Division I FBS football season as a member of the Big 12 Conference. The Cougars are led by third-year head coach Willie Fritz and play home games at TDECU Stadium in Houston, Texas.

== Offseason ==
=== Transfers ===
==== Outgoing ====
Player	Position	Destination
Jayden York	TE	Abilene Christian
J'Marion Burnette	RB	Appalachian State
Demetrius Hunter	IOL	Colorado
Devan Williams	WR	Lamar
Austin Carlisle	QB	Louisiana–Monroe
Joshua Donald	DL	Louisville
Cavan Tuley	EDGE	Missouri
Blake Hogshooter	WR	Oklahoma State
Cayden Bowie	IOL	Prairie View A&M
Jesus Machado	LB	Rice
Zion Taylor	EDGE	Sam Houston
Marquis Shoulders	WR	Stephen F. Austin
David Ndukwe	OT	Syracuse
Derek Joiner	IOL	Tarleton State
Corey Platt Jr.	LB	Texas Tech
Zeon Chriss-Gremillion	QB	Tulane
Reshad Sterling	EDGE	Tulane
Zavian Tibbs	DL	Western Michigan

==== Incoming ====
Player	Position	Previous School
Evan Noel	K	Florida
Muizz Tounkara	WR	Florida
Jack Carson-Wentz	LS	Florida A&M
Drew Terrill	OT	Miami (OH)
Hayden Wright	OT	Northwestern
De'Marion Thomas	DL	Oklahoma State
Jaden Yates	LB	Ole Miss
Makhi Hughes	RB	Oregon
Ashton Porter	DL	Oregon
Trent Walker	WR	Oregon State
Jalen Mayo	CB	Stephen F. Austin
Luke Carney	QB	Syracuse
Tyson Turner	WR	Texas Tech
Anthony Boswell	IOL	Toledo
Shadre Hurst	IOL	Tulane
Javion White	S	Tulane
Patrick Overmyer	TE	UTSA
Miller Malone	LB	Western Kentucky
Ejiroghene Egodogbare	DL	Yale

== Preseason ==
The Cougars opened spring practice on March 9.

== Schedule ==
Date	Time	Opponent	Rank	Site	TV	Result	Attendance
September 5	11:00 a.m.	Oregon State*	No. 23	TDECU Stadium; Houston, TX	ESPN	W 33–20	28,742
September 12	6:00 p.m.	Southern*	No. 22	TDECU Stadium; Houston, TX	ESPN+	W 77–6	28,936
September 18	7:00 p.m.	at No. 13 Texas Tech	No. 22	Galaxy Stadium; Lubbock, TX (rivalry)	FOX	L 26–28	60,229
September 26	3:00 p.m.	at Georgia Southern*	No. 25	Paulson Stadium; Statesboro, GA	ESPNU	W 42–28	24,112
October 3	11:00 a.m.	UCF	No. 20	TDECU Stadium; Houston, TX	ESPN2	W 27–17	25,593
October 10	2:30 p.m.	at Kansas State	No. 22	Bill Snyder Family Football Stadium; Manhattan, KS	FOX	W 35–16	51,569
October 17	6:30 p.m.	No. 18 Oklahoma State	No. 20	TDECU Stadium; Houston, TX	FOX	W 35–32	42,544
October 24	9:15 p.m.	at No. 10 Utah	No. 14	Rice–Eccles Stadium; Salt Lake City, UT (College GameDay)	ESPN	L 13–21	51,864
November 7	2:30 p.m.	Cincinnati^{†}	No. 17	TDECU Stadium; Houston, TX	FOX	W 31–24	32,372
November 13	9:15 p.m.	at Colorado	No. 14	Folsom Field; Boulder, CO	ESPN	L 32–42	47,495
November 21	12:00 p.m.	at West Virginia	No. 20	Milan Puskar Stadium; Morgantown, WV	TNT/TruTV	W 34–31	37,380
November 28	8:30 p.m.	Baylor		TDECU Stadium; Houston, TX (rivalry)	ESPN2	–	
*Non-conference game; ^{†}Homecoming; Rankings from AP Poll (and CFP Rankings, after November 3) – Released prior to game; All times are in Central time; Source:

== Rankings ==
Ranking movements Legend: ██ Increase in ranking ██ Decrease in ranking RV = Received votes
	Week															
Poll	Pre	1	2	3	4	5	6	7	8	9	10	11	12	13	14	Final
AP	23	22	22	25	20	22	20	14	18	17	14	20	17			
Coaches	24	22	23	RV	20	19	18	16	19	18	16	21	17			
CFP	Not released									17	14	20				Not released

== Game summaries ==
=== vs Oregon State ===
Oregon State Beavers (0–0) at No. 23 Houston Cougars (0–0) – Game summary

Quarter	1	2	3	4	Total
Beavers	7	0	6	7	20
No. 23 Cougars	9	10	7	7	33

at TDECU Stadium • Houston, Texas

- Date: September 5
- Game time: 11:00 a.m.
- Game weather: Cloudy • Temperature: 89 °F (32 °C) • Wind: W at 1 mph (1.6 km/h)
- Game attendance: 28,742
- Referee: Gary Reed
- TV announcers (ESPN): Anish Shroff, Andre Ware, and Morgan Uber

Game information

First quarter

- HOU – Amare Thomas 31-yard pass from Conner Weigman (Jonathan Dimas kick failed), 8:13. Cougars 6–0. Drive: 10 plays, 85 yards, 4:06.
- ORST – Braden Atkinson 3-yard run (Caleb Ojeda kick), 6:17. Beavers 7–6. Drive: 4 plays, 80 yards, 1:50.
- HOU – Jonathan Dimas 42-yard field goal, 4:15. Cougars 9–7. Drive: 6 plays, 41 yards, 2:02.

Second quarter

- HOU – Re'Shaun Sanford II 56-yard run (Jonathan Dimas kick), 6:27. Cougars 16–7. Drive: 4 plays, 70 yards, 1:46.
- HOU – Jonathan Dimas 32-yard field goal, 0:35. Cougars 19–7. Drive: 11 plays, 57 yards, 2:22.

Third quarter

- HOU – Makhi Hughes 1-yard run (Jonathan Dimas kick), 6:40. Cougars 26–7. Drive: 9 plays, 74 yards, 5:01.
- ORST – Jesse Legree 7-yard pass from Braden Atkinson (pass failed), 0:44. Cougars 26–13. Drive: 14 plays, 89 yards, 5:56.

Fourth quarter

- ORST – AJ Newberry 4-yard run (Caleb Ojeda kick), 9:02. Cougars 26–20. Drive: 7 plays, 75 yards, 3:45.
- HOU – Conner Weigman 1-yard run (Jonathan Dimas kick), 5:01. Cougars 33–20. Drive: 9 plays, 75 yards, 4:01.

Statistics	ORST	HOU
First downs	20	24
Plays–yards	54–402	72–533
Rushes–yards	25–26	41–228
Passing yards	376	305
Passing: comp–att–int	29–48–0	20–31–1
Turnovers	0	2
Time of possession	29:10	30:50

Team	Category	Player	Statistics
Oregon State	Passing	Braden Atkinson	29/48, 376 yards, TD
Oregon State	Rushing	Kourdey Glass	6 carries, 25 yards
Oregon State	Receiving	Jesse Legree	5 receptions, 136 yards, TD
Houston	Passing	Conner Weigman	20/30, 305 yards, TD, INT
Houston	Rushing	Makhi Hughes	17 carries, 98 yards, TD
Houston	Receiving	Amare Thomas	8 receptions, 133 yards, TD

=== vs Southern (FCS) ===
Southern Jaguars (FCS) (0–0) at No. 22 Houston Cougars (1–0) – Game summary

Quarter	1	2	3	4	Total
Jaguars (FCS)	0	0	6	0	6
No. 22 Cougars	28	21	21	7	77

at TDECU Stadium • Houston, Texas

- Date: September 12
- Game time: 6:00 p.m.
- Game weather: Cloudy • Temperature: 95 °F (35 °C) • Wind: SE at 8 mph (13 km/h)
- Game attendance: 28,936
- Referee: Tim Rich
- TV announcers (ESPN+): Jason Ross Jr., Tyoka Jackson, and Austyn Iven

Game information

First quarter

- HOU – Patrick Overmyer 9-yard pass from Conner Weigman (Jonathan Dimas kick), 8:59. Cougars 7–0. Drive: 9 plays, 62 yards, 3:54.
- HOU – Re'Shaun Sanford II 9-yard run (Jonathan Dimas kick), 6:52. Cougars 14–0. Drive: 2 plays, 22 yards, 0:44.
- HOU – Makhi Hughes 1-yard run (Jonathan Dimas kick), 4:11. Cougars 21–0. Drive: 5 plays, 22 yards, 1:57.
- HOU – Amare Thomas 8-yard pass from Conner Weigman (Jonathan Dimas kick), 0:28. Cougars 28–0. Drive: 6 plays, 60 yards, 2:46.

Second quarter

- HOU – Koby Young 43-yard pass from Conner Weigman (Jonathan Dimas kick), 10:57. Cougars 35–0. Drive: 3 plays, 51 yards, 1:30.
- HOU – Koby Young 7-yard pass from Keisean Henderson (Jonathan Dimas kick), 6:10. Cougars 42–0. Drive: 3 plays, 25 yards, 0:48.
- HOU – John Hebert 20-yard pass from Keisean Henderson (Jonathan Dimas kick), 1:36. Cougars 49–0. Drive: 5 plays, 72 yards, 2:21.

Third quarter

- HOU – Keisean Henderson 54-yard run (Jonathan Dimas kick), 13:43. Cougars 56–0. Drive: 3 plays, 75 yards, 1:17.
- HOU – DJ Butler 9-yard run (Jonathan Dimas kick), 9:39. Cougars 63–0. Drive: 5 plays, 46 yards, 2:28.
- HOU – John Hebert 7-yard run (Jonathan Dimas kick), 4:57. Cougars 70–0. Drive: 5 plays, 52 yards, 2:24.
- SOU – Wydell Clark Jr. 79-yard pass from Wyatt McCauley (Christopher McKenna kick blocked), 4:38. Cougars 70–6. Drive: 1 play, 79 yards, 0:14.

Fourth quarter

- HOU – Luke Carney 8-yard run (Jonathan Dimas kick), 5:56. Cougars 77–6. Drive: 11 plays, 75 yards, 13:42.

Statistics	SOU	HOU
First downs	4	34
Plays–yards	42–121	64–591
Rushes–yards	22–(-6)	45–388
Passing yards	127	203
Passing: comp–att–int	10–20–1	15–19–0
Turnovers	3	0
Time of possession	21:42	38:18

Team	Category	Player	Statistics
Southern	Passing	Wyatt McCauley	2/3, 85 yards, TD
Southern	Rushing	Armariyan Asberry	3 carries, 6 yards
Southern	Receiving	Wydell Clark Jr.	1 reception, 79 yards, TD
Houston	Passing	Conner Weigman	9/12, 120 yards, 3 TD
Houston	Rushing	Zane Smith	10 carries, 69 yards
Houston	Receiving	Koby Young	3 receptions, 54 yards, 2 TD

=== at No. 13 Texas Tech (rivalry) ===
No. 22 Houston Cougars (2–0) at No. 13 Texas Tech Red Raiders (2–0) – Game summary

Quarter	1	2	3	4	Total
No. 22 Cougars	10	7	3	6	26
No. 13 Red Raiders	0	14	7	7	28

at Galaxy Stadium, Lubbock, Texas

- Date: September 18
- Game time: 7:00 p.m.
- Game weather: Sunny • Temperature: 89 °F (32 °C) • Wind: S 10 mph
- Game attendance: 60,229
- Referee: Michael VanderVelde
- TV announcers (FOX): Tim Brando, Devin Gardner, and Josh Sims

Game information
First quarter
- HOU – Jonathan Dimas 31-yard field goal, 9:27. Cougars 3–0. Drive: 13 plays, 62 yards, 5:33.
- HOU – Amare Thomas 11-yard pass from Conner Weigman (Jonathan Dimas kick), 3:49. Cougars 10–0. Drive: 10 plays, 55 yards, 5:45.

Second quarter

- TTU – Kenny Johnson 35-yard pass from Will Hammond (Stone Harrington kick), 14:08. Cougars 10–7. Drive: 7 plays, 75 yards, 2:14.
- TTU – Thomas Castellanos 3-yard run (Stone Harrington kick), 3:39. Red Raiders 14–10. Drive: 5 plays, 80 yards, 2:28.
- HOU – Koby Young 46-yard pass from Conner Weigman (Jonathan Dimas kick), 1:11. Cougars 17–14. Drive: 6 plays, 75 yards, 2:28.

Third quarter

- TTU – J'Koby Williams 29-yard run (Stone Harrington kick), 12:41. Red Raiders 21–17. Drive: 5 plays, 75 yards, 2:19.
- HOU – Jonathan Dimas 28-yard field goal, 5:31. Red Raiders 21–20. Drive: 13 plays, 71 yards, 7:04.

Fourth quarter

- TTU – Cameron Dickey 1-yard run (Stone Harrington kick), 7:36. Red Raiders 28–20. Drive: 11 plays, 87 yards, 6:03.
- HOU – Patrick Overmyer 10-yard pass from Conner Weigman (run failed), 0:49. Red Raiders 28–26. Drive: 10 plays, 78 yards, 1:55.

Statistics	HOU	TTU
First downs	27	22
Plays–yards	75–458	60–425
Rushes–yards	37–176	32–168
Passing yards	282	257
Passing: comp–att–int	27–38–0	17–28–2
Time of possession	33:42	26:18

Team	Category	Player	Statistics
Houston	Passing	Conner Weigman	27/38, 282 yards, 3 TD
Houston	Rushing	Makhi Hughes	15 carries, 71 yards
Houston	Receiving	Amare Thomas	7 receptions, 75 yards, TD
Texas Tech	Passing	Will Hammond	17/27, 257 yards, TD, INT
Texas Tech	Rushing	Cameron Dickey	16 carries, 65 yards, TD
Texas Tech	Receiving	Kenny Johnson	4 receptions, 113 yards, TD

=== at Georgia Southern ===
No. 25 Houston Cougars (2–1) at Georgia Southern Eagles (1–2) – Game summary

Quarter	1	2	3	4	Total
No. 25 Cougars	14	14	7	7	42
Eagles	0	14	7	7	28

at Paulson Stadium • Statesboro, Georgia

- Date: September 26
- Game time: 3:00 p.m.
- Game weather: Sunny • Temperature: 81 °F (27 °C) • Wind: S at 6 mph (9.7 km/h)
- Game attendance: 24,112
- Referee: Brandon Kirkland
- TV announcers (ESPNU): Courtney Lyle and Rene Ingoglia

Game information

First quarter

- HOU – Conner Weigman 5-yard run (Jonathan Dimas kick), 10:30. Cougars 7–0. Drive: 6 plays, 37 yards, 2:11.
- HOU – Koby Young 22-yard pass from Conner Weigman (Jonathan Dimas kick), 2:31. Cougars 14–0. Drive: 8 plays, 67 yards, 4:11.

Second quarter

- GASO – Alex Taylor 40-yard pass from Max Johnson (Tripp Bryant kick), 13:32. Cougars 14–7. Drive: 7 plays, 75 yards, 3:59.
- GASO – Ty Cummings 2-yard run (Tripp Bryant kick), 9:28. Tied 14–14. Drive: 8 plays, 54 yards, 4:01.
- HOU – Conner Weigman 1-yard run (Jonathan Dimas kick), 5:48. Cougars 21–14. Drive: 9 plays, 75 yards, 3:40.
- HOU – Traville Frederick Jr. 2-yard pass from Conner Weigman (Jonathan Dimas kick), 0:52. Cougars 28–14. Drive: 9 plays, 75 yards, 2:51.

Third quarter

- HOU – Trent Walker 23-yard pass from Conner Weigman (Jonathan Dimas kick), 11:25. Cougars 35–14. Drive: 8 plays, 73 yards, 3:30.
- GASO – Alex Taylor 23-yard pass from Max Johnson (Tripp Bryant kick), 6:34. Cougars 35–21. Drive: 9 plays, 76 yards, 4:45.

Fourth quarter

- HOU – Amare Thomas 11-yard pass from Conner Weigman (Jonathan Dimas kick), 14:10. Cougars 42–21. Drive: 14 plays, 86 yards, 7:20.
- GASO – River Helms 5-yard pass from Max Johnson (Tripp Bryant kick), 8:20. Cougars 42–28. Drive: 12 plays, 75 yards, 5:50.

Statistics	HOU	GASO
First downs	28	22
Plays–yards	63–441	65–355
Rushes–yards	41–202	26–66
Passing yards	239	289
Passing: comp–att–int	17–22–0	27–39–0
Time of possession	28:39	31:21

Team	Category	Player	Statistics
Houston	Passing	Conner Weigman	17/22, 239 yards, 4 TD
Houston	Rushing	Re'Shaun Sanford II	17 carries, 120 yards
Houston	Receiving	Trent Walker	6 receptions, 83 yards, TD
Georgia Southern	Passing	Max Johnson	26/38, 284 yards, 3 TD
Georgia Southern	Rushing	David Mbadinga	6 carries, 37 yards
Georgia Southern	Receiving	Alex Taylor	6 receptions, 119 yards, 2 TD

=== vs UCF ===
UCF Knights (3–1) at No. 20 Houston Cougars (3–1) – Game summary

Quarter	1	2	3	4	Total
Knights	7	3	7	0	17
No. 20 Cougars	0	0	14	13	27

at TDECU Stadium • Houston, Texas

- Date: October 3
- Game time: 11:00 a.m.
- Game weather: Cloudy • Temperature: 82 °F (28 °C) • Wind: NE at 9 miles per hour (14 km/h)
- Game attendance: 25,593
- Referee: Kevin Mar
- TV announcers (ESPN2): Anish Shroff, Andre Ware, and Morgan Uber

Game information

First quarter

- UCF – Josh Derry 13-yard pass from Keyone Jenkins (Will Stone Kick), 11:17, Knights 7–0. Drive: 6 plays, 75 yards, 3:43.

Second quarter

- UCF – Will Stone 30-yard field goal, 1:36, Knights 10–0. Drive: 8 plays, 68 yards, 1:52.

Third quarter

- UCF – Keyone Jenkins 5-yard run (Will Stone kick), 6:01 Knights 17–0. Drive: 9 plays, 71 yards, 5:48.
- HOU – Conner Weigman 19-yard run (Jonathan Dimas kick), 3:38 Knights 17–7. Drive: 7 plays, 75 yards, 2:23.
- HOU – Conner Weigman 1-yard run (Jonathan Dimas kick), 1:11 Knights 17–14. Drive: 2 plays, 2 yards, 0:41.

Fourth quarter

- HOU – Conner Weigman 1-yard run (Jonathan Dimas kick), 10:15 Cougars 21–17. Drive: 11 plays, 62 yards, 4:36.
- HOU – Jonathan Dimas 40-yard field goal, 4:14, Cougars 24–17. Drive: 9 plays, 56 yards, 3:59.
- HOU – Jonathan Dimas 46-yard field goal, 1:56, Cougars 27–17. Drive: 5 plays, 3 yards, 0:34.

Statistics	UCF	HOU
First downs	13	23
Plays–yards	59–332	77–393
Rushes–yards	21–73	44–154
Passing yards	259	239
Passing: comp–att–int	25–38–1	18–33–0
Time of possession	26:38	33:32

Team	Category	Player	Statistics
UCF	Passing	Keyone Jenkins	23/35, 253 yards, TD, INT
UCF	Rushing	Duke Watson	9 carries, 50 yards
UCF	Receiving	Josh Derry	7 receptions, 101 yards, TD
Houston	Passing	Conner Weigman	18/33, 239 yards
Houston	Rushing	Re'Shaun Sanford II	18 carries, 62 yards
Houston	Receiving	Patrick Overmyer	6 receptions, 76 yards

=== at Kansas State ===
No. 22 Houston Cougars (4–1) at Kansas State Wildcats (3–1) – Game summary

Quarter	1	2	3	4	Total
No. 22 Cougars	7	14	14	0	35
Wildcats	3	0	6	7	16

at Bill Snyder Family Football Stadium • Manhattan, Kansas

- Date: October 10
- Game time: 2:30 p.m.
- Game weather: Sunny • Temperature: 87 °F (31 °C) • Wind: SW at 14 miles per hour (23 km/h)
- Game attendance: 51,569
- Referee: Luke Richmond
- TV announcers (FOX): Tim Brando, Devin Gardner, and Josh Sims

Game information
First quarter
- HOU – Patrick Overmyer 1-yard pass from Conner Weigman (Jonathan Dimas kick), 9:20. Cougars 7–0. Drive: 12 plays, 75 yards, 5:40.
- KSU – Luis Rodriguez 29-yard field goal, 0:00. Cougars 7–3. Drive: 10 plays, 69 yards, 3:53.

Second quarter

- HOU – Patrick Overmyer 2-yard pass from Conner Weigman (Jonathan Dimas kick), 9:52. Cougars 14–3. Drive: 12 plays, 75 yards, 5:08.
- HOU – Makhi Hughes 13-yard run (Jonathan Dimas kick), 3:17. Cougars 21–3. Drive: 8 plays, 81 yards, 3:47.

Third quarter

- HOU – Patrick Overmyer 8-yard pass from Conner Weigman (Jonathan Dimas kick), 9:23. Cougars 28–3. Drive: 8 plays, 76 yards, 3:27.
- KSU – Garrett Oakley 13-yard pass from Avery Johnson (pass failed), 6:11. Cougars 28–9. Drive: 6 plays, 64 yards, 3:04.
- HOU – Patrick Overmyer 2-yard pass from Conner Weigman (Jonathan Dimas kick), 0:48. Cougars 35–9. Drive: 10 plays, 67 yards, 5:16.

Fourth quarter

- KSU – Jaron Tibbs 6-yard pass from Avery Johnson (Luis Rodriguez kick), 3:39. Cougars 35–16. Drive: 13 plays, 61 yards, 6:02.

Statistics	HOU	KSU
First downs	26	19
Plays–yards	73–475	59–299
Rushes–yards	43–233	29–117
Passing yards	242	182
Passing: comp–att–int	19–30–0	16–30–1
Time of possession	34:49	25:11

Team	Category	Player	Statistics
Houston	Passing	Conner Weigman	19/30, 242 yards, 4 TD
Houston	Rushing	Re'Shaun Sanford II	20 carries, 90 yards
Houston	Receiving	Patrick Overmyer	8 receptions, 83 yards, 4 TD
Kansas State	Passing	Avery Johnson	16/30, 182 yards, 2 TD, INT
Kansas State	Rushing	Rodney Fields Jr.	14 carries, 46 yards
Kansas State	Receiving	Garrett Oakley	3 receptions, 49 yards, TD

=== vs No. 18 Oklahoma State ===
No. 18 Oklahoma State Cowboys (4–1) at No. 20 Houston Cougars (5–1) – Game summary

Quarter	1	2	3	4	Total
No. 18 Cowboys	3	0	14	15	32
No. 20 Cougars	7	7	14	7	35

at TDECU Stadium • Houston, Texas

- Date: October 17
- Game time: 6:30 p.m.
- Game weather: Clear • Temperature: 69 °F (21 °C) • Wind: NE at 11 miles per hour (18 km/h)
- Game attendance: 42,544
- Referee: Stephen Baron
- TV announcers (FOX): Jack Kizer and Mark Helfrich

Game information
First quarter
- OKST – Sam Keltner 23-yard field goal, 8:39. Cowboys 3–0. Drive: 7 plays, 43 yards, 2:53.
- HOU – Patrick Overmyer 2-yard pass from Conner Weigman (Jonathan Dimas kick), 2:19. Cougars 7–3. Drive: 12 plays, 75 yards, 6:20.

Second quarter

- HOU – Amare Thomas 7-yard pass from Conner Weigman (Jonathan Dimas kick), 2:22. Cougars 14–3. Drive: 7 plays, 25 yards, 3:00.

Third quarter

- OKST – Ayo Adeyi 13-yard run (Sam Keltner kick), 10:57. Cougars 14–10. Drive: 8 plays, 75 yards, 4:03.
- HOU – Trent Walker 2-yard pass from Conner Weigman (Jonathan Dimas kick), 9:05. Cougars 21–10. Drive: 6 plays, 75 yards, 1:52.
- OKST – Wyatt Young 2-yard pass from Drew Mestemaker (Sam Keltner kick), 4:45. Cougars 21–17. Drive: 10 plays, 90 yards, 4:16.
- HOU – Amare Thomas 21-yard pass from Conner Weigman (Jonathan Dimas kick), 2:00. Cougars 28–17. Drive: 7 plays, 75 yards, 2:45.

Fourth quarter

- OKST – Caleb Hawkins 66-yard pass from Drew Mestemaker (Drew Mestemaker pass to Justin Bowick), 11:57. Cougars 28–25. Drive: 1 play, 66 yards, 0:11.
- HOU – Koby Young 48-yard pass from Conner Weigman (Jonathan Dimas kick), 9:48. Cougars 35–25. Drive: 5 plays, 85 yards, 2:04.
- OKST – Justin Bowick 8-yard pass from Drew Mestemaker (Sam Keltner kick), 4:54. Cougars 35–32. Drive: 10 plays, 96 yards, 4:51.

Statistics	OKST	HOU
First downs	25	26
Plays–yards	59–499	73–505
Rushes–yards	25–134	40–162
Passing yards	365	343
Passing: comp–att–int	22–34–1	24–33–1
Time of possession	24:48	35:12

Team	Category	Player	Statistics
Oklahoma State	Passing	Drew Mestemaker	22/34, 365 yards, 3 TD, INT
Oklahoma State	Rushing	Caleb Hawkins	17 carries, 68 yards
Oklahoma State	Receiving	Caleb Hawkins	7 receptions, 125 yards, TD
Houston	Passing	Conner Weigman	24/33, 343 yards, 5 TD, INT
Houston	Rushing	Makhi Hughes	18 carries, 77 yards
Houston	Receiving	Amare Thomas	7 receptions, 126 yards, 2 TD

=== at No. 10 Utah ===
No. 14 Houston Cougars (6–1) at No. 10 Utah Utes (6–0) – Game summary

Quarter	1	2	3	4	Total
No. 14 Cougars	0	3	10	0	13
No. 10 Utes	0	0	7	14	21

at Rice–Eccles Stadium • Salt Lake City, Utah

- Date: October 24
- Game time: 9:15 p.m.
- Game weather: Clear • Temperature: 47 °F (8 °C) • Wind: NE at 5 miles per hour (8.0 km/h)
- Game attendance: 51,864
- Referee: Henry Johns
- TV announcers (ESPN): Tom Hart, Roddy Jones, and Quint Kessenich

Game information
First quarter
- No scoring plays.

Second quarter

- HOU – Jonathan Dimas 24-yard field goal, 3:44, Cougars 3–0. Drive: 15 plays, 74 yards, 7:44.

Third quarter

- HOU – Makhi Hughes 2-yard run (Jonathan Dimas kick), 6:46. Cougars 10–0. Drive: 15 plays, 75 yards, 8:14.
- UTAH – Devon Dampier 22-yard run (Dillon Curtis kick), 4:25. Cougars 10–7. Drive: 5 plays, 75 yards, 2:21.
- HOU – Jonathan Dimas 47-yard field goal, 2:17, Cougars 13–7. Drive: 5 plays, 38 yards, 2:01.

Fourth quarter

- UTAH – Wayshawn Parker 5-yard run (Dillon Curtis kick), 11:57. Utes 14–13. Drive: 10 plays, 80 yards, 5:13.
- UTAH – Devon Dampier 9-yard run (Dillon Curtis kick), 2:09. Utes 21–13. Drive: 1 play, 9 yards, 0:06.

Statistics	HOU	UTAH
First downs	17	24
Plays–yards	66–368	61–430
Rushes–yards	31–86	35–226
Passing yards	282	204
Passing: comp–att–int	19–35–0	18–26–2
Time of possession	29:55	30:05

Team	Category	Player	Statistics
Houston	Passing	Conner Weigman	19/35, 282 yards
Houston	Rushing	Makhi Hughes	19 carries, 52 yards, TD
Houston	Receiving	Amare Thomas	5 receptions, 133 yards
Utah	Passing	Devon Dampier	18/26, 204 yards, 2 INT
Utah	Rushing	Devon Dampier	15 carries, 150 yards, 2 TD
Utah	Receiving	Creed Whittemore	4 receptions, 53 yards

=== vs Cincinnati ===
Cincinnati Bearcats (5–3) at No. 17 Houston Cougars (6–2) – Game summary

Quarter	1	2	3	4	Total
Bearcats	0	10	7	7	24
No. 17 Cougars	14	7	3	7	31

at TDECU Stadium • Houston, Texas

- Date: November 7
- Game time: 2:30 p.m.
- Game weather: Sunny • Temperature: 79 °F (26 °C) • Wind: E at 11 miles per hour (18 km/h)
- Game attendance: 32,372
- Referee: Kevin Mar
- TV announcers (FOX): Tim Brando, Devin Gardner, and Josh Sims

Game information
First quarter
- HOU – Amare Thomas 8-yard pass from Conner Weigman (Jonathan Dimas kick), 9:04. Cougars 7–0. Drive: 12 plays, 72 yards, 5:50.
- HOU – Amare Thomas 31-yard pass from Conner Weigman (Jonathan Dimas kick), 6:23. Cougars 14–0. Drive: 6 plays, 67 yards, 1:50.

Second quarter

- CIN – Cole Tabb 17-yard pass from JC French IV (Stephen Rusnak kick), 14:16. Cougars 14–7. Drive: 13 plays, 77 yards, 7:02.
- CIN – Stephen Rusnak 28-yard field goal, 5:55. Cougars 14–10. Drive: 11 plays, 51 yards, 5:52.
- HOU – Conner Weigman 2-yard run (Jonathan Dimas kick), 2:30. Cougars 21–10. Drive: 7 plays, 75 yards, 3:20.

Third quarter

- CIN – Gavin Grover 34-yard pass from JC French IV (Stephen Rusnak kick), 10:02. Cougars 21–17. Drive: 10 plays, 80 yards, 4:49.
- HOU – Jonathan Dimas 28-yard field goal, 5:13. Cougars 24–17. Drive: 11 plays, 64 yards, 4:43.

Fourth quarter

- CIN – JC French IV 1-yard run (Stephen Rusnak kick), 6:21. Tied 24–24. Drive: 16 plays, 96 yards, 8:41.
- HOU – Re'Shaun Sanford II 51-yard run (Jonathan Dimas kick), 5:10. Cougars 31–24. Drive: 3 plays, 75 yards, 1:11.

Statistics	CIN	HOU
First downs	30	23
Plays–yards	71–379	59–468
Rushes–yards	41–162	35–241
Passing yards	217	227
Passing: comp–att–int	19–30–0	17–24–0
Time of possession	33:38	26:22

Team	Category	Player	Statistics
Cincinnati	Passing	JC French IV	19/30, 217 yards, 2 TD
Cincinnati	Rushing	Gi'Bran Payne	11 carries, 71 yards
Cincinnati	Receiving	Malachi Henry	6 receptions, 65 yards
Houston	Passing	Conner Weigman	17/24, 227 yards, 2 TD
Houston	Rushing	Re'Shaun Sanford II	15 carries, 126 yards, TD
Houston	Receiving	Amare Thomas	6 receptions, 78 yards, 2 TD

=== at Colorado ===
No. 14 Houston Cougars (7–2) at Colorado Buffaloes (3–6) – Game summary

Quarter	1	2	3	4	Total
No. 14 Cougars	3	17	0	12	32
Buffaloes	0	21	14	7	42

at Folsom Field • Boulder, Colorado

- Date: November 13
- Game time: 9:15 p.m.
- Game weather: Cloudy • Temperature: 46 °F (8 °C) • Wind: SW 6 mph
- Game attendance: 47,495
- Referee: Michael McCabe
- TV announcers (ESPN): Anish Shroff, Andre Ware, and Morgan Uber

Game information

First quarter

- (7:50) HOU – Jonathan Dimas 27-yard field goal (Drive: 15 plays, 66 yards, 7:10; Houston 3–0)

Second quarter

- (14:55) HOU – Makhi Hughes 8-yard run, Jonathan Dimas kick (Drive: 13 plays, 85 yards, 5:41; Houston 10–0)
- (9:25) COLO – Richard Young 38-yard run, Daniel Gerlach kick (Drive: 10 plays, 94 yards, 5:23; Houston 10–7)
- (6:52) HOU – Amare Thomas 4-yard pass from Conner Weigman, Jonathan Dimas kick (Drive: 6 plays, 75 yards, 2:33; Houston 17–7)
- (2:36) HOU – Jonathan Dimas 52-yard field goal (Drive: 9 plays, 46 yards, 3:25; Houston 20–7)
- (1:49) COLO – DeKalon Taylor 67-yard run, Daniel Gerlach kick (Drive: 3 plays, 75 yards, 0:47; Houston 20–14)
- (0:15) COLO – Jaquail Smith 32-yard run, Daniel Gerlach kick (Drive: 4 plays, 56 yards, 0:36; Colorado 21–20)

Third quarter

- (13:21) COLO – Joseph Williams 53-yard pass from Isaac Wilson, Daniel Gerlach kick (Drive: 3 plays, 55 yards, 1:28; Colorado 28–20)
- (5:26) COLO – Kaneal Sweetwyne 14-yard run, Daniel Gerlach kick (Drive: 11 plays, 66 yards, 5:41; Colorado 35–20)

Fourth quarter

- (10:00) HOU – Patrick Overmyer 22-yard pass from Conner Weigman, two-point conversion failed (Drive: 8 plays, 62 yards, 2:12; Colorado 35–26)
- (3:59) COLO – Richard Young 2-yard run, Daniel Gerlach kick (Drive: 11 plays, 75 yards, 6:01; Colorado 42–26)
- (1:51) HOU – Trent Walker 4-yard pass from Conner Weigman, two-point conversion failed (Drive: 9 plays, 75 yards, 2:08; Colorado 42–32)

Statistics	HOU	COLO
First downs	28	20
Plays–yards	76–477	64–466
Rushes–yards	34–205	39–249
Passing yards	272	217
Passing: comp–att–int	26–42–1	17–25–1
Time of possession	29:58	30:02

Team	Category	Player	Statistics
Houston	Passing	Conner Weigman	26/42, 272 yards, 3 TD, INT
Houston	Rushing	Makhi Hughes	15 carries, 106 yards, TD
Houston	Receiving	Patrick Overmyer	9 receptions, 116 yards, TD
Colorado	Passing	Isaac Wilson	17/25, 217 yards, TD, INT
Colorado	Rushing	Richard Young	21 carries, 99 yards, 2 TD
Colorado	Receiving	Joseph Williams	5 receptions, 80 yards, TD

=== at West Virginia ===
No. 20 Houston Cougars (7–3) at West Virginia Mountaineers (5–5) – Game summary

Quarter	1	2	3	4	Total
No. 20 Cougars	14	7	3	10	34
Mountaineers	10	14	7	0	31

at Milan Puskar Stadium • Morgantown, West Virginia

- Date: November 21
- Game time: 12:00 p.m.
- Game weather: Sunny • Temperature: 66 °F (19 °C) • Wind: SE 5 mph
- Game attendance: 37,380
- Referee: Tutashinda Salaam
- TV announcers (TNT/TruTV): J. B. Long, Mike Golic Jr., and Allie LaForce

Game information
First quarter
- HOU – Amare Thomas 68-yard pass from Keisean Henderson (Jonathan Dimas kick), 13:43. Cougars 7–0. Drive: 3 plays, 75 yards, 1:17.
- WVU – Cam Cook 8-yard run (Jack Cassidy kick), 11:48. Tied 7–7. Drive: 6 plays, 75 yards, 1:55.
- HOU – Makhi Hughes 21-yard run (Jonathan Dimas kick), 6:40. Cougars 14–7. Drive: 7 plays, 66 yards, 3:04.
- WVU – Jack Cassidy 31-yard field goal, 0:58. Cougars 14–10. Drive: 10 plays, 67 yards, 3:19.

Second quarter

- WVU – John Neider 3-yard pass from Michael Hawkins Jr. (Jack Cassidy kick), 10:16. Mountaineers 17–14. Drive: 11 plays, 90 yards, 3:56.
- HOU – Makhi Hughes 2-yard run (Jonathan Dimas kick), 6:32. Cougars 21–17. Drive: 9 plays, 75 yards, 3:44.
- WVU – Amari Latimer 3-yard run (Jack Cassidy kick), 3:41. Mountaineers 24–21. Drive: 8 plays, 75 yards, 2:36.

Third quarter

- WVU – Michael Hawkins Jr. 10-yard run (Jack Cassidy kick), 12:26. Mountaineers 31–21. Drive: 6 plays, 70 yards, 2:30.
- HOU – Jonathan Dimas 34-yard field goal, 0:45. Mountaineers 31–24. Drive: 5 plays, 60 yards, 1:24.

Fourth quarter

- HOU – Makhi Hughes 3-yard run (Jonathan Dimas kick), 5:25. Tied 31–31. Drive: 13 plays, 87 yards, 6:04.
- HOU – Jonathan Dimas 23-yard field goal, 0:00. Cougars 34–31. Drive: 8 plays, 33 yards, 1:34.

Statistics	HOU	WVU
First downs	21	26
Plays–yards	76–490	81–459
Rushes–yards	48–222	55–329
Passing yards	268	130
Passing: comp–att–int	18–28–0	13–26–0
Time of possession	30:24	29:36

Team	Category	Player	Statistics
Houston	Passing	Keisean Henderson	18/28, 268 yards, TD
Houston	Rushing	Makhi Hughes	19 carries, 158 yards, 3 TD
Houston	Receiving	Amare Thomas	6 receptions, 89 yards, TD
West Virginia	Passing	Michael Hawkins Jr.	13/24, 130 yards, TD
West Virginia	Rushing	Cam Cook	25 carries, 131 yards, TD
West Virginia	Receiving	Cyrus Traugh	2 receptions, 46 yards

=== vs Baylor ===
Baylor Bears (6–5) at Houston Cougars (8–3) – Game summary

Quarter	1	2	Total
Bears			0
Cougars			0

at TDECU Stadium • Houston, Texas

- Date: November 28
- Game time: TBD

Statistics	BAY	HOU
First downs		
Plays–yards		
Rushes–yards		
Passing yards		
Passing: comp–att–int		
Time of possession		

Team	Category	Player	Statistics
Baylor	Passing		
Baylor	Rushing		
Baylor	Receiving		
Houston	Passing		
Houston	Rushing		
Houston	Receiving		
