= 2026 Tulane Green Wave football team =

American college football season

2026 Tulane Green Wave football
- Conference: American Conference
- Record: 6–5 (4–3 American)
- Head coach: Will Hall (1st season)
- Offensive coordinator: Russ Callaway (1st season)
- Offensive scheme: West Coast / power spread
- Defensive coordinator: Tayler Polk (1st season)
- Co-defensive coordinator: Nate Fuqua (1st season)
- Base defense: 3–3–5
- Home stadium: Yulman Stadium

2026 American Conference football standings
	Conf.			Overall
Team	W		L	W		L
UTSA	6	–	1	9	–	2
Memphis	5	–	2	8	–	3
East Carolina	5	–	2	7	–	4
North Texas	5	–	2	7	–	4
UAB	4	–	3	6	–	5
Army	4	–	3	5	–	5
Tulsa	4	–	3	7	–	4
Florida Atlantic	4	–	3	7	–	4
Tulane	4	–	3	6	–	5
Navy	3	–	4	4	–	6
South Florida	2	–	5	6	–	5
Rice	1	–	6	2	–	9
Charlotte	1	–	6	1	–	10
Temple	1	–	6	2	–	9
Championship: December 5, 2026
As of November 22, 2026; Rankings from AP poll

The 2026 Tulane Green Wave football team will represent Tulane University as a member of the American Conference during the 2026 NCAA Division I FBS football season. Led by first-year head coach Will Hall, the Green Wave will play their home games at Yulman Stadium in New Orleans, Louisiana.

== Schedule ==
Date	Time	Opponent	Site	TV	Result	Attendance
September 5	2:30 p.m.	at Duke*	Wallace Wade Stadium; Durham, NC	ACCN	L 3–17	16,113
September 12	6:00 p.m.	South Alabama*	Yulman Stadium; New Orleans, LA	ESPN+	W 28–24	24,323
September 19	11:00 a.m.	at Kansas State*	Bill Snyder Family Football Stadium; Manhattan, KS	ESPN2	L 20–31	51,846
September 26	6:00 p.m.	Southern Miss*	Yulman Stadium; New Orleans, LA (Battle for the Bell)	ESPN+	W 24–21	22,984
October 10	11:00 a.m.	at Army	Michie Stadium; West Point, NY	CBSSN	L 17–20	29,722
October 16	6:30 p.m.	Memphis	Yulman Stadium; New Orleans, LA	ESPN	W 31–17	20,083
October 24	7:00 p.m.	UTSA	Yulman Stadium; New Orleans, LA	ESPNU	L 19–42	19,015
October 30	6:00 p.m.	at Charlotte	Jerry Richardson Stadium; Charlotte, NC	ESPN2	W 38–31 ^{OT}	8,106
November 7	11:00 a.m.	Tulsa^{†}	Yulman Stadium; New Orleans, LA	ESPNU	L 10–60	27,539
November 14	3:30 p.m.	at Rice	First Community Stadium; Houston, TX	ESPN+	W 20–17	18,921
November 21	11:00 a.m.	North Texas	Yulman Stadium; New Orleans, LA	ESPNU	W 28–24	16,203
November 28	2:30 p.m.	at South Florida	Raymond James Stadium; Tampa, FL	ESPN+		
*Non-conference game; ^{†}Homecoming; All times are in Mountain time

== Game summaries ==
=== at Duke ===
Tulane Green Wave (0–0) at Duke Blue Devils (0–0) – Game summary

Quarter	1	2	3	4	Total
Green Wave	0	0	0	3	3
Blue Devils	7	3	0	7	17

at Wallace Wade Stadium • Durham, North Carolina

- Date: September 5
- Game time: 2:30 p.m. CDT
- Game weather: Sunny • Temperature: 93 °F (34 °C)
- Game attendance: 16,113
- Referee: Charles Lamertina
- TV announcers (ACCN): Jorge Sedano, Rodney McLeod and Ashley Stroehlein

Game information

First quarter

- DUKE – Nate Sheppard 9-yard run (Cosme Salas kick), 5:07. Blue Devils 7–0. Drive: 17 plays, 75 yards, 9:53.

Second quarter

- DUKE – Cosme Salas 22-yard field goal, 0:00. Blue Devils 10–0. Drive: 9 plays, 43 yards, 1:45.

Third quarter

- No scoring plays.

Fourth quarter

- TULN – Jackson Courville 37-yard field goal, 13:37. Blue Devils 10–3. Drive: 7 plays, 39 yards, 2:35.
- DUKE – Nate Sheppard 14-yard run (Cosme Salas kick), 6:44. Blue Devils 17–3. Drive: 12 plays, 75 yards, 6:53.

Statistics	TULN	DUKE
First downs	10	20
Plays–yards	56–258	77–381
Rushes–yards	26–54	49–250
Passing yards	204	131
Passing: comp–att–int	17–30–0	13–28–0
Turnovers	1	1
Time of possession	23:25	36:35

Team	Category	Player	Statistics
Tulane	Passing	Kadin Semonza	11/21, 140 yards
Tulane	Rushing	Johnnie Daniels	8 carries, 31 yards
Tulane	Receiving	Destyn Hill	5 receptions, 67 yards
Duke	Passing	Walker Eget	13/26, 131 yards
Duke	Rushing	Nate Sheppard	35 carries, 227 yards, 2 TD
Duke	Receiving	Jonah Burton	3 receptions, 38 yards

=== South Alabama ===
South Alabama Jaguars (1–0) at Tulane Green Wave (0–1) – Game summary

Quarter	1	2	3	4	Total
Jaguars	10	0	7	7	24
Green Wave	0	14	7	7	28

at Yulman Stadium • New Orleans, Louisiana

- Date: September 12
- Game time: 6:00 p.m. CDT
- Game weather: Cloudy • Temperature: 83 °F (28 °C) • Wind: SW 7 mph
- Game attendance: 24,323
- Referee: Reid Jackson
- TV announcers (ESPN+): Jack Benjamin, Henry Burris and Maria Trivelpiece

Game information

First quarter

- (8:03) USA – Davis Little 40-yard field goal (Drive: 11 plays, 63 yards, 5:00; South Alabama 3–0)
- (1:31) USA – PJ Martin 16-yard run, Davis Little kick (Drive: 6 plays, 73 yards, 2:32; South Alabama 10–0)

Second quarter

- (14:57) TULN – Johnnie Daniels 2-yard run, Jackson Courville kick (Drive: 4 plays, 65 yards, 1:34; South Alabama 10–7)
- (1:55) TULN – Johnnie Daniels 3-yard run, Jackson Courville kick (Drive: 7 plays, 95 yards, 3:36; Tulane 14–10)

Third quarter

- (12:17) USA – Anthony Eager 43-yard pass from Bishop Davenport, Davis Little kick (Drive: 5 plays, 92 yards, 2:41; South Alabama 17–14)
- (4:53) TULN – Jaylin Lucas 80-yard run, Jackson Courville kick (Drive: 2 plays, 80 yards, 0:18; Tulane 21–17)

Fourth quarter

- (11:49) USA – Brendan Jenkins 17-yard pass from Bishop Davenport, Davis Little kick (Drive: 12 plays, 70 yards, 7:58; South Alabama 24–21)
- (1:17) TULN – Destyn Hill 14-yard pass from Kadin Semonza, Jackson Courville kick (Drive: 7 plays, 78 yards, 3:22; Tulane 28–24)

Statistics	USA	TULN
First downs	26	13
Plays–yards	72–478	51–424
Rushes–yards	40–182	29–212
Passing yards	296	212
Passing: comp–att–int	22–32–0	14–22–0
Turnovers	0	0
Time of possession	37:40	22:20

Team	Category	Player	Statistics
South Alabama	Passing	Bishop Davenport	22/32, 296 yards, 2 TD
South Alabama	Rushing	PJ Martin	15 carries, 73 yards, TD
South Alabama	Receiving	Brendan Jenkins	9 receptions, 119 yards, TD
Tulane	Passing	Kadin Semonza	14/22, 212 yards, TD
Tulane	Rushing	Jaylin Lucas	11 carries, 214 yards, TD
Tulane	Receiving	Destyn Hill	4 receptions, 91 yards, TD

=== at Kansas State ===
Tulane Green Wave (1–1) at Kansas State Wildcats (2–0) – Game summary

Quarter	1	2	3	4	Total
Green Wave	7	3	3	7	20
Wildcats	0	17	7	7	31

at Bill Snyder Family Football Stadium • Manhattan, Kansas

- Date: September 19
- Game time: 11:00 a.m. CDT
- Game weather: Sunny • Temperature: 84 °F (29 °C) • Wind: SW 9 mph
- Game attendance: 51,846
- Referee: Tim Rich
- TV announcers (ESPN2): Anish Shroff, Andre Ware and Morgan Uber

Statistics	TULN	KSU
First downs	18	20
Plays–yards	59–260	65–428
Rushes–yards	33–95	37–201
Passing yards	165	227
Passing: comp–att–int	13–26–0	21–28–0
Turnovers	0	0
Time of possession	26:19	33:41

Team	Category	Player	Statistics
Tulane	Passing	Kadin Semonza	13/26, 165 yards, TD
Tulane	Rushing	Johnnie Daniels	10 carries, 59 yards
Tulane	Receiving	Oliver Mitchell Jr.	1 receptions, 41 yards
Kansas State	Passing	Avery Johnson	21/28, 227 yards
Kansas State	Rushing	Avery Johnson	12 carries, 152 yards, 2 TD
Kansas State	Receiving	Jaron Tibbs	9 receptions, 114 yards

=== Southern Miss (Battle for the Bell) ===
Southern Miss Golden Eagles (1–2) at Tulane Green Wave (1–2) – Game summary

Quarter	1	2	3	4	Total
Golden Eagles	0	0	0	0	0
Green Wave	0	0	0	0	0

at Yulman Stadium • New Orleans, Louisiana

- Date: September 26
- Game time: 6:00 p.m. CDT
- TV announcers (ESPN+): Jack Benjamin (play-by-play), Henry Burris (analyst) and Maria Trivelpiece (sideline reporter)

Statistics	USM	TULN
First downs		
Plays–yards		
Rushes–yards		
Passing yards		
Passing: comp–att–int		
Time of possession		

Team	Category	Player	Statistics
Southern Miss	Passing		
Southern Miss	Rushing		
Southern Miss	Receiving		
Tulane	Passing		
Tulane	Rushing		
Tulane	Receiving		

=== at Army ===
Tulane Green Wave (2–2) at Army Black Knights (2–2) – Game summary

Quarter	1	2	3	4	Total
Green Wave	0	0	0	0	0
Black Knights	0	0	0	0	0

at Michie Stadium • West Point, New York

- Date: October 10
- Game time: 11:00 a.m. CDT
- TV: CBSSN

Statistics	TULN	ARMY
First downs		
Plays–yards		
Rushes–yards		
Passing yards		
Passing: comp–att–int		
Time of possession		

Team	Category	Player	Statistics
Tulane	Passing		
Tulane	Rushing		
Tulane	Receiving		
Army	Passing		
Army	Rushing		
Army	Receiving		

=== Memphis ===
Memphis Tigers (5–1) at Tulane Green Wave (2–3) – Game summary

Quarter	1	2	3	4	Total
Tigers	0	0	0	0	0
Green Wave	0	0	0	0	0

at Yulman Stadium • New Orleans, Louisiana

- Date: October 16
- Game time: 6:30 p.m. CDT
- TV: ESPN

Statistics	MEM	TULN
First downs		
Plays–yards		
Rushes–yards		
Passing yards		
Passing: comp–att–int		
Time of possession		

Team	Category	Player	Statistics
Memphis	Passing		
Memphis	Rushing		
Memphis	Receiving		
Tulane	Passing		
Tulane	Rushing		
Tulane	Receiving		

=== UTSA ===
UTSA Roadrunners (6–1) at Tulane Green Wave (3–3) – Game summary

Quarter	1	2	3	4	Total
Roadrunners	0	0	0	0	0
Green Wave	0	0	0	0	0

at Yulman Stadium • New Orleans, Louisiana

- Date: October 24
- Game time: TBD

Statistics	UTSA	TULN
First downs		
Plays–yards		
Rushes–yards		
Passing yards		
Passing: comp–att–int		
Time of possession		

Team	Category	Player	Statistics
UTSA	Passing		
UTSA	Rushing		
UTSA	Receiving		
Tulane	Passing		
Tulane	Rushing		
Tulane	Receiving		

=== at Charlotte ===
Tulane Green Wave (3–4) at Charlotte 49ers (1–6) – Game summary

Quarter	1	2	3	4	Total
Green Wave	0	0	0	0	0
49ers	0	0	0	0	0

at Jerry Richardson Stadium • Charlotte, North Carolina

- Date: October 30
- Game time: 6:00 p.m. CDT
- TV: ESPN2

Statistics	TULN	CLT
First downs		
Plays–yards		
Rushes–yards		
Passing yards		
Passing: comp–att–int		
Time of possession		

Team	Category	Player	Statistics
Tulane	Passing		
Tulane	Rushing		
Tulane	Receiving		
Charlotte	Passing		
Charlotte	Rushing		
Charlotte	Receiving		

=== Tulsa ===
Tulsa Golden Hurricane (4–4) at Tulane Green Wave (4–4) – Game summary

Quarter	1	2	3	4	Total
Golden Hurricane	0	0	0	0	0
Green Wave	0	0	0	0	0

at Yulman Stadium • New Orleans, Louisiana

- Date: November 7
- Game time: TBD

Statistics	TLSA	TULN
First downs		
Plays–yards		
Rushes–yards		
Passing yards		
Passing: comp–att–int		
Time of possession		

Team	Category	Player	Statistics
Tulsa	Passing		
Tulsa	Rushing		
Tulsa	Receiving		
Tulane	Passing		
Tulane	Rushing		
Tulane	Receiving		

=== at Rice ===
Tulane Green Wave (4–5) at Rice Owls (1–8) – Game summary

Quarter	1	2	3	4	Total
Green Wave	0	0	0	0	0
Owls	0	0	0	0	0

at First Community Stadium • Houston, Texas

- Date: November 14
- Game time: TBD

Statistics	TULN	RICE
First downs		
Plays–yards		
Rushes–yards		
Passing yards		
Passing: comp–att–int		
Time of possession		

Team	Category	Player	Statistics
Tulane	Passing		
Tulane	Rushing		
Tulane	Receiving		
Rice	Passing		
Rice	Rushing		
Rice	Receiving		

=== North Texas ===
North Texas Mean Green (7–3) at Tulane Green Wave (5–5) – Game summary

Quarter	1	2	3	4	Total
Mean Green	0	0	0	0	0
Green Wave	0	0	0	0	0

at Yulman Stadium • New Orleans, Louisiana

- Date: November 21
- Game time: TBD

Statistics	UNT	TULN
First downs		
Plays–yards		
Rushes–yards		
Passing yards		
Passing: comp–att–int		
Time of possession		

Team	Category	Player	Statistics
North Texas	Passing		
North Texas	Rushing		
North Texas	Receiving		
Tulane	Passing		
Tulane	Rushing		
Tulane	Receiving		

=== at South Florida ===
Tulane Green Wave (6–5) at South Florida Bulls (6–5) – Game summary

Quarter	1	2	3	4	Total
Green Wave	0	0	0	0	0
Bulls	0	0	0	0	0

at Raymond James Stadium • Tampa, Florida

- Date: November 28
- Game time: TBD

Statistics	TULN	USF
First downs		
Plays–yards		
Rushes–yards		
Passing yards		
Passing: comp–att–int		
Time of possession		

Team	Category	Player	Statistics
Tulane	Passing		
Tulane	Rushing		
Tulane	Receiving		
South Florida	Passing		
South Florida	Rushing		
South Florida	Receiving		

== Personnel ==
=== Roster ===
2026 Tulane Green Wave football team roster
Players
Coaches
Offense

Pos.	#	Name	Class
RB	0	Maurice Turner	Sr
WR	2	Destyn Hill	Jr
QB	3	Kadin Semonza	Jr
WR	5	Anthony Brown-Stephens	Sr
RB	6	Johnnie Daniels	Sr
WR	8	Bredell Richardson	So
QB	9	Zeon Chriss-Gremillion	Sr
QB	11	Trace Johnson	Fr
QB	12	Cade Scott	Fr
RB	12	Jaylin Lucas	Sr
TE	13	Ty Thompson	GS
QB	14	Dagan Bruno	So
WR	15	Zycarl Lewis Jr.	So
WR	16	Garrett Mmahat	Sr
QB	17	Jay Beamon	Fr
TE	19	Dawson Johnson	So
RB	21	DJ Dugar	Fr
TE	22	Jakson Judge	Jr
RB	25	Jamauri McClure	So
WR	26	Walker Davis	So
WR	28	Seth Gale	So
WR	37	Cash Semonza	Fr
WR	39	John Barton	Fr
RB	43	Gabe Mocek	Fr
OL	51	John Bock II	Sr
OL	52	Tristen Fortenberry	So
OL	55	Dominic Steward	So
OL	58	Ryan Mickow	Jr
OL	59	Andre Amos Jr.	Fr
OL	60	Jaxon Ducre	So
OL	60	Gavin Marks	So
OL	61	Leo Wulffraat	So
OL	66	Gresham Perry	Fr
OL	67	Tylan George	Fr
OL	68	Robbie Pizzolato	Sr
OL	70	Juelz Baptiste	Fr
OL	71	Riley Rushing	Jr
OL	72	Mitch Hodnett	So
OL	73	Elijah Baker	So
OL	75	Colin O'Carroll	So
OL	77	Darion Reed	Jr
OL	78	Reese Baker	So
WR	80	Oliver Mitchell Jr.	So
WR	81	Kellen Tasby	So
WR	84	Antwaun Parham	Fr
WR	85	Gabe Daniels	So
TE	86	Gabe Lovorn	Fr
TE	87	Cameron Roberts	Fr
TE	88	Colby Simpson	Fr
TE	89	DJ Cicero	So

Defense

Pos.	#	Name	Class
S	1	Jack Tchienchou	Jr
LB	2	Dickson Agu	Jr
LB	4	Chris Rodgers	Sr
S	7	Kevin Adams III	Jr
DE	10	Gerrod Henderson	Sr
CB	11	E'zaiah Shine	So
LB	11	Dalton Hughes	Sr
DB	12	Anthony Rogers	So
DB	13	Tavare Smith	Sr
SPR	13	Kajuan Banks	Sr
CB	14	Armani Cargo	So
BAN	15	Jordan McAllister	Jr
CB	19	Shaun Nicholas	Jr
DB	20	Myrone Jean	Fr
CB	21	Marquez Stevenson	Jr
CB	22	LJ Green	Jr
CB	22	Justin Agu	GS
DB	23	Josh Sims	Fr
SPR	24	Michael Igbinoghene	Fr
S	26	Dorion Jackson	Jr
S	27	Chase Green	So
DB	30	Joshua Moore	Jr
S	31	Carson Klein	So
DB	33	Rodrek Williams II	GS
BAN	40	Warren Roberts Jr.	Fr
LB	41	Chan Lumpkin	Fr
LB	42	Makai Williams	Sr
LB	43	Grayson McPherson	Fr
LB	44	Jean Claude Joseph III	Jr
DL	45	Ed Smith	Sr
LB	47	Zach Dresch	Fr
BAN	48	Jah'rie Garner	Jr
DL	51	Reshad Sterling	Fr
DL	53	Jack Stivers	So
DL	55	Nick Witherspoon	Fr
BAN	89	Miles Smith	Fr
DL	92	Armondous Cooley	Sr
DL	94	Derrick Shepard Jr.	Sr
DL	96	Geordan Guidry	So
DL	97	Nik Alston	Fr
DL	98	PaLanding Drammeh	Fr
DL	99	Josh Lewis	Fr

Special teams

Pos.	#	Name	Class
P	34	William Hudlow	Jr
K	35	Cooper Helmke	Fr
K	46	Zach Marini	So
LS	57	Jason Arredondo	So
K	96	Jackson Courville	Jr

Head coach

- Will Hall

Coordinators/assistant coaches

- Russ Callaway – Offensive coordinator
- Tayler Polk – Defensive coordinator/inside linebackers
- Chris Forestier – Special teams coordinator
- Nate Fuqua – Co-defensive coordinator/bandits
- Brayden Berezowitz – Pass game coordinator/spears
- Bryan Berezowitz – Pass game coordinator/safeties
- Collin D'Angelo – Quarterbacks
- Brock Hays – Running backs
- Cody Kennedy – Offensive line
- J. J. McCleskey – Cornerbacks
- Eric McDaniel – Defensive line
- Carter Sheridan – Wide receivers
- Tyler Spotts-Orgeron – Tight ends
- Ricky Figurell – Assistant special teams coordinator
- Kanan Ray – Assistant, offensive line
- Bryan Whitehead – Defensive assistant
- Bryce Bohanon – Graduate assistant, wide receivers
- Luke Byrne – Graduate assistant, offensive line
- Justin Ibieta – Graduate assistant, tight ends
- Mason Lambert – Graduate assistant, inside linebackers
- Chris Hatcher – Chief of Staff
- Kelly Comarda – General Manager
- Rory Thornton – Director, football operations
- Kyle Schexnayder – Assistant general manager
- Derick Bugg – Director, player development
- Keith Domino – Director, player acquisition and retention
- Cody Heidbreder – Director, football equipment
- Colin Kenyon – Director, strength and conditioning
- Colton Leggett – Director, scouting
- Matt Ungashick – Personnel Specialist
- Wes Bordelon – Associate director, sports performance
- Markus James – Associate director, strength and conditioning
- Arturo Calderon – Graduate assistant
- Chris Wurl – Graduate assistant

Legend

- (C) Team captain
- (S) Suspended
- (I) Ineligible
- Injured
- Redshirt

Roster
Last update: 5/26/26

=== Transfers ===
==== Outgoing ====
Player	Position	Destination
Jayden Lewis	CB	Alabama A&M
Anthony Miller	TE	Arizona State
Jahiem Johnson	CB	Arkansas
Landry Cannon	IOL	Arkansas State
Zuberi Mobley	RB	Bethune–Cookman
Santana Hopper	DL	Colorado
Alec Clark	P	Florida
Patrick Durkin	K	Florida
Shadre Hurst	OL	Houston
Javion White	S	Houston
Shazz Preston	WR	Indiana
Arnold Barnes III	RB	Iowa State
Omari Hayes	WR	Iowa State
Tre'Von McAlpine	DL	Kansas
Jayce Mitchell	IOL	Louisiana
Joshua Brantley	EDGE	Louisiana Tech
Justyn Reid	TE	Louisville
Harvey Dyson	EDGE	NC State
Harold Lawson	LB	Northwestern State
Dallas Winner-Johnson	LB	Oklahoma State
Eliyt Nairne	DL	Pittsburgh
Phoenix Derichsweiler	LS	Rice
Aidan Parker	P	Southeastern Louisiana
Javin Gordon	RB	Tennessee
Jordan Norman	EDGE	Tennessee
Jimmy Calloway	WR	Tulsa
Donovan Leary	QB	West Florida
Landon Hammond	CB	Unknown
Ananias Harris	OT	Unknown

==== Incoming ====
Player	Position	Previous School
Ryan Mickow	OT	Boston College
Vance Bolyard	TE	Duke
Jaylin Lucas	RB	Florida State
Zeon Chriss-Gremillion	QB	Houston
Reshad Sterling	EDGE	Houston
Justin Agu	CB	Louisville
Destyn Hill	WR	LSU
Riley Rushing	IOL	Mars Hill
Gavin Marks	IOL	Mercer
Johnnie Daniels	RB	Mississippi State
Jordan McAllister	EDGE	New Hampshire
Anthony Rogers	CB	Nicholls
Jackson Courville	K	Ohio State
DJ Dugar Jr.	RB	Oklahoma State
Dawson Johnson	TE	Old Dominion
Dalton Hughes	LB	South Alabama
Ed Smith IV	DL	South Alabama
Kajuan Banks	CB	South Florida
Gabe Daniels	WR	Syracuse
Marquez Stevenson	CB	Texas Tech
Bredell Richardson	WR	UCF
