= Henry Cain (musician) =

Henry Cain, 1935 - May 10, 2005 (Las Vegas) was a keyboard player. He played piano and organ in the soul-jazz and rhythm and blues genres, who was active in the Indianapolis music scene for many years.

== Life and work ==
Cain took music lessons as a child, attended Cathedral High School (Indianapolis) and studied at Indiana University. From the 1950s he worked as a musician in Indianapolis; In 1954 he founded the jazz trio The 3 Souls with drummer Albert Coleman and bassist Will Scott, which existed until Will Scott's death in 2004. The trio performed successfully in the clubs on Indiana Avenue in Indianapolis.

As a leader of The 3 Souls he recorded a few singles on the Note and All-Indy labels. The most successful song was “Night Theme” (1958). He also played in Los Angeles from 1964 with Della Reese (Like It Like Dat!, 1965), Howard Roberts, Lorez Alexandria and Bobby Bryant. In 1968 he recorded the album The Funk Organization of Henry Cain, produced by David Axelrod, for which H.B. Barnum and Oliver Nelson provided the arrangements. The discographer Tom Lord lists his involvement in 15 recording sessions from 1960 to 1971. In his later years, Cain worked as an accompanist for vocalists such as Lola Falana, Nancy Wilson, Freda Payne and The Osmonds in Las Vegas, where he died in 2005.

== Discography ==
=== As leader ===
- The Funky Organ-ization Of Henry Cain (Capitol ST 2688, 1968) arrangements by H.B. Barnum and Oliver Nelson.

=== As sideman ===
- With Jack Wilson:
  - The Jazz Organs (Vault 108, 1964)
- With Howard Roberts Quartet:
  - Goodies (Capitol ST 2400, 1965)
  - Whatever's Fair! (Capitol ST 2478, 1966)
- With Della Reese:
  - One More Time! Recorded Live at the Playboy Club (ABC-589, 1966)
- With Bobby Bryant:
    - Swahili Strut (Cadet CA 50011, 1971)
- With Keisa Brown:
  - Keisa Brown......Live! (Little Star LSLP 1001, 1975)
- With Esther Phillips:
  - At Onkel Pö's Carnegie Hall Hamburg 1978 (Jazzline N 78047, 2017)

=== Selected singles ===
As member of The 3 Souls; and in two (1969 and 1970) singles for Lorez Alexandria.
