= Darrick Brownlow =

American football player (born 1968)

No. 59, 55, 50
- Position: Linebacker

Personal information
- Born: December 28, 1968 (age 57); Indianapolis, Indiana, U.S.
- Listed height: 5 ft 10 in (1.78 m)
- Listed weight: 237 lb (108 kg)

Career information
- High school: Cathedral (Indianapolis)
- College: Illinois (1987–1990)
- NFL draft: 1991: 5th round, 132nd overall pick

Career history
- Dallas Cowboys (1991); Buffalo Bills (1992)*; Tampa Bay Buccaneers (1992–1993); Dallas Cowboys (1994); Washington Redskins (1995–1996); Chicago Bears (1997)*
- * Offseason or practice squad member only

Awards and highlights
- PFWA All-Rookie Team (1991); Second-team All-American (1990); Big Ten Co-Defensive Player of the Year (1990); 3× First-team All-Big Ten (1988–1990)

Career NFL statistics
- Total tackles: 40
- Safeties: 1
- Stats at Pro Football Reference

Darrick Dewayne Brownlow (born December 28, 1968) is an American former professional football player who was a linebacker in the National Football League (NFL) for the Dallas Cowboys, Tampa Bay Buccaneers and Washington Redskins. He played college football for the Illinois Fighting Illini and was selected by the Cowboys in the fifth round of the 1991 NFL draft.

== Early life ==
Brownlow attended Cathedral High School, winning the Indiana 3A state high school championship in 1986. He accepted a football scholarship from the University of Illinois at Urbana-Champaign. As a freshman, he was named captain of the special teams units, becoming the first freshman in school history to be named a game captain. He had 19 defensive tackles as a backup linebacker.

As a sophomore, he was named the starter at middle linebacker, led the Big Ten Conference in tackles with 155 and became the leader of the Illini defense. As a junior, he posted 130 tackles (third in the conference), one interception, one sack and 4 passes defensed.

As a senior, despite mid-season back and ankle injuries, he finished with 155 tackles (second in the conference), 2 interceptions, 4 passes defensed, one sack and one fumble recovery. He became only the fifth player in school history to receive All-Big Ten honors in three consecutive seasons. He was named the Big Ten Conference Defensive Player of the Year and placed second in the balloting for the Butkus award. He also received the 1991 Hula Bowl defensive MVP award, after making 9 tackles, one interception and one fumble recovery.

He finished second in the school's All-time tackle list with 459. He was named by the media to the Illini 1980s All-Decade Team.

== Professional career ==
=== Dallas Cowboys (first stint) ===
Brownlow was selected by the Dallas Cowboys in the fifth round (132nd overall) of the 1991 NFL draft, after dropping because concerns with his size. As a rookie, he had an impact playing on the special teams units, which included blocking a punt that helped upset the Chicago Bears in the Wild Card Playoff win. He was a backup at middle linebacker behind Jack Del Rio, making 4 defensive tackles, one blocked kick and 17 special teams tackles (third on the team).

=== Buffalo Bills ===
On March 11, 1992, he signed with the Buffalo Bills as a Plan B free agent. He was waived on August 31.

=== Tampa Bay Buccaneers ===
On September 1, 1992, he was claimed off waivers by the Tampa Bay Buccaneers. He started the last four games of the 1992 season.

On August 31, 1993, he was released. In September, he was re-signed during the second week of the season. He posted 9 defensive tackles and 11 special teams tackles.

=== Los Angeles Raiders ===
In 1994, he signed as a free agent with the Los Angeles Raiders and was released on July 14.

=== Dallas Cowboys (second stint) ===
On July 19, 1994, Brownlow signed with the Dallas Cowboys. He contributed to upgrade the coverage units and led the team in special teams tackles with 27.

=== Washington Redskins ===
On March 16, 1995, he signed as a free agent with the Washington Redskins. He received recognition as one of the best special teams players in the league at different times during his six-year career. He wasn't re-signed after the 1996 season.

=== Chicago Bears ===
On July 19, 1997, he was signed by the Chicago Bears as a free agent. He was released on August 13. He retired after never missing a game.

== Personal life ==
Brownlow currently resides in Indianapolis with his wife and three kids. Upon retiring from the NFL, he earned an MBA from Indiana Wesleyan University and is the owner of several businesses in Indianapolis. He is also an assistant football coach at his alma-mater, Cathedral High School.
