= Pete Werner =

American football player (born 1999)

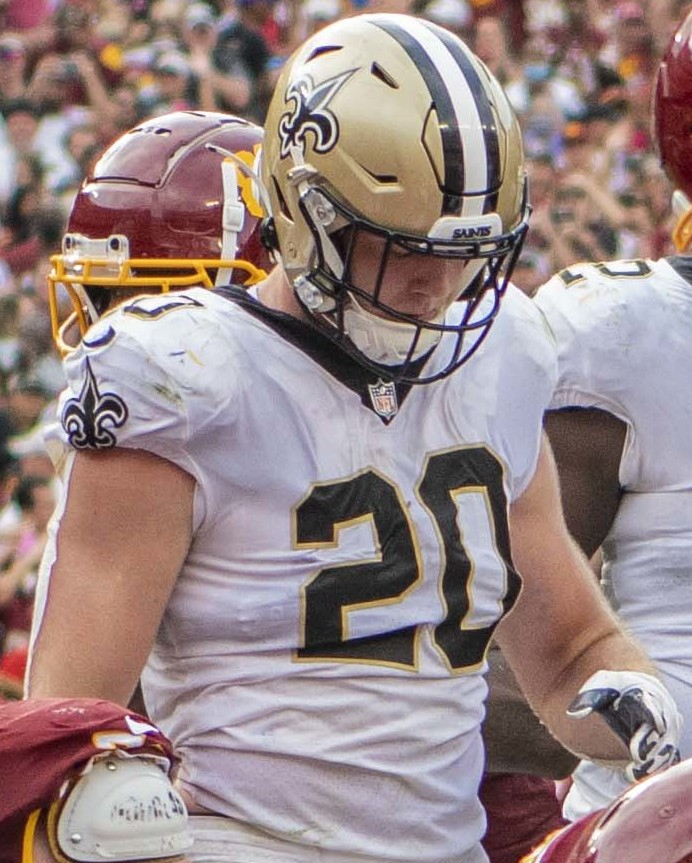
- Werner with the New Orleans Saints in 2021

No. 20 – New Orleans Saints
- Position: Linebacker
- Roster status: Active

Personal information
- Born: June 5, 1999 (age 27); Indianapolis, Indiana, U.S.
- Listed height: 6 ft 3 in (1.91 m)
- Listed weight: 242 lb (110 kg)

Career information
- High school: Cathedral (Indianapolis)
- College: Ohio State (2017–2020)
- NFL draft: 2021: 2nd round, 60th overall pick

Career history
- New Orleans Saints (2021–present)

Awards and highlights
- First-team All-Big Ten (2020)

Career NFL statistics as of 2025
- Total tackles: 408
- Sacks: 2.5
- Forced fumbles: 2
- Fumble recoveries: 5
- Pass deflections: 10
- Interceptions: 1
- Stats at Pro Football Reference

Pete Werner (born June 5, 1999) is an American professional football linebacker for the New Orleans Saints of the National Football League (NFL). He played college football for the Ohio State Buckeyes and was selected by the Saints in the second round of the 2021 NFL draft.

== Early life ==
Werner grew up in Indianapolis, Indiana, and attended Cathedral High School. Werner initially committed to play college football at Notre Dame at the end of his junior year over offers from Duke, Iowa, Michigan, Michigan State, Northwestern, Ohio State, Penn State, Tennessee, Texas A&M, Vanderbilt and Wisconsin. As a senior, he recorded 64 tackles, with 17 tackles for loss and eight sacks and was named Class 6A All-State. Werner de-committed from Notre Dame during the season and re-opened his recruitment before opting to attend Ohio State.

== College career ==
Werner recorded nine tackles as a true freshman. He had 58 tackles including 7.5 tackles for loss and two forced fumbles in his sophomore season. As a junior, Werner recorded 64 tackles, 5.5 tackles for loss, two fumbles recovered and three passes broken up and was named honorable mention All-Big Ten Conference.

== Professional career ==
Pre-draft measurables
Height	Weight	Arm length	Hand span	Wingspan	40-yard dash	10-yard split	20-yard split	20-yard shuttle	Three-cone drill	Vertical jump	Broad jump	Bench press
6 ft 2 7/8 in (1.90 m)	238 lb (108 kg)	33 1/4 in (0.84 m)	9 in (0.23 m)	6 ft 7 1/4 in (2.01 m)	4.59 s	1.56 s	2.67 s	4.38 s	6.90 s	39.5 in (1.00 m)	10 ft 2 in (3.10 m)	20 reps
All values from Pro Day

The New Orleans Saints selected Werner in the second round (60th overall) of the 2021 NFL draft. Werner was the sixth linebacker drafted in 2021.

On June 8, 2021, the New Orleans Saints signed Werner to a four-year, $5.64 million contract that includes $2.41 million guaranteed upon signing and a signing bonus of $1.49 million.

During the beginning of training camp, Werner competed against second-year veteran Zack Baun to be the starting weakside linebacker. Head coach Sean Payton named Werner the primary backup weakside linebacker, after the Saints signed Kwon Alexander to become the starter.

On September 9, 2021, Werner made his professional regular season debut, appearing on special teams before exiting the Saints' 38–3 home-opening victory over the Green Bay Packers.

On January 1, 2022, Werner received a fine of $5,472 from the NFL due to a Horse-collar tackle on Miami Dolphins' running back Duke Johnson.

On August 8, 2024, the New Orleans Saints signed Werner to a three–year, $22.50 million contract extension that includes $17.43 million guaranteed, $11.18 million guaranteed upon signing, and a signing bonus of $5.50 million.

== NFL career statistics ==
Legend
**Bold**	Career high

=== Regular season ===
Year	Team	Games		Tackles					Interceptions						Fumbles				
Year	Team	GP	GS	Cmb	Solo	Ast	Sck	TFL	Int	Yds	Avg	Lng	TD	PD	FF	Fmb	FR	Yds	TD
2021	NO	15	8	62	36	26	0.0	**4**	0	0	0.0	0	0	0	0	0	0	0	0
2022	NO	12	11	80	56	24	0.0	3	0	0	0.0	0	0	3	**2**	0	0	0	0
2023	NO	16	16	**93**	**60**	33	0.5	**4**	**1**	0	0.0	0	0	1	0	0	2	**3**	0
2024	NO	13	13	92	54	**38**	0.0	3	0	0	0.0	0	0	1	0	0	0	0	0
2025	NO	17	15	81	50	31	**2.0**	**4**	0	0	0.0	0	0	**5**	0	0	**3**	0	0
Career		73	63	408	256	152	2.5	18	1	0	0.0	0	0	10	2	0	5	3	0

== Personal life ==
Werner's father, Greg Werner, played college football at DePauw University and in the NFL for two seasons with the New York Jets and Philadelphia Eagles. His older brother Dan played college football at Harvard.
