= Cathedral High School (Indianapolis) =

Location
- 5225 East 56th Street; Indianapolis, Marion County, Indiana 46226; United States; 39°51′07″N 86°04′51″W

Information
- Type: Private, Coeducational
- Religious affiliation: Roman Catholic
- Established: 1918
- Founder: Bishop Joseph Chartrand
- President: Robert Bridges
- Principal: Mark Matthews
- Teaching staff: 92.8 (on an FTE basis)
- Grades: 9–12
- Enrollment: 1,171 (2023-24)
- Student to teacher ratio: 12.6
- Classes offered: 188
- Campus size: 40 acres
- Colors: Navy and gold
- Slogan: Greatness is calling
- Fight song
- Athletics conference: Independent
- Sports: Football, Soccer, Cross Country, Volleyball, Basketball, Track and Field, Tennis, Lacrosse, Swimming, Cheerleading, Wrestling
- Mascot: Leprechaun
- Team name: Fighting Irish
- Accreditation: North Central Association of Colleges and Schools, Lumen Accreditation, The Catholic University of America
- Newspaper: The Megaphone
- Yearbook: The Cathedran
- School fees: Student Activity of $525
- Tuition: $19,650
- Feeder schools: 160 different schools from throughout the Indianapolis area
- Nobel laureates: James Muller
- Website: Official Website

Cathedral High School is a private Catholic high school in Indianapolis, Indiana. The school serves approximately 1,100 students in grades 9 to 12. The school was founded in the Archdiocese of Indianapolis by Bishop Joseph Chartrand in 1918 and was run by the Brothers of Holy Cross until it became independent by the late 1970s. Holy Cross returned to the school in 2011. Cathedral is accredited by Lumen Accreditation from The Catholic University of America and was the first Catholic high school in Indiana to be so accredited.

== History ==
The school was founded as a boys high school by the Brothers of Holy Cross in 1918. In the 1970s, with the departure of the Brothers, a non-profit trust was developed by Robert V. Welch, other parents, and a lay board in an effort to keep Cathedral alive. As part of that change, the school moved from its longtime home in downtown Indianapolis to its present location at 56th and Emerson streets, the site of the former all-girls Ladywood St. Agnes Academy. This change also facilitated the admission of girls to Cathedral High School. The original location of the school at 1400 North Meridian Street is today the headquarters for the Archdiocese of Indianapolis.

Before 1942, Cathedral was not a part of the Indiana High School Athletic Association, so any sports titles they won prior to this were not accepted by the IHSAA. During the 20th century, Cathedral was the first all-white school to play Crispus Attucks High School, at the time an all-black school, in athletics.

=== Mary sculpture ===
Mary on the facade of the main building

The sculpture Mary is mounted in a limestone niche on the main school building facade. Created by an unknown artist in 1963, the 60-by-25-by-16-inch (152 cm × 64 cm × 41 cm) statue is painted and appears to be made of concrete. The statue is a full-length robed representation of the Virgin Mary, standing with her hands outstretched with her palms facing upwards. The sculpture was surveyed in 1994 by the Smithsonian's Save Outdoor Sculpture! survey program and its condition was described as needing treatment.

=== Return of Holy Cross Brothers ===
On September 13, 2011, Cathedral celebrated its 93rd birthday and was formally re-affiliated with the Brothers of Holy Cross. Currently, there are three members of the Congregation of Holy Cross employed by the school. Cathedral is one of seven high schools that Holy Cross oversees in their Midwest Province.

=== Controversy ===
In June 2019, Charles C. Thompson, the Archbishop of Indianapolis, asked the school to fire a teacher involved in a same-sex marriage or else the archdiocese would end its association with the school. Cathedral complied, noting that they would have lost permission to refer to itself as a Catholic school, the ability to celebrate the Sacraments, and its status as an independent nonprofit organization.

== Academics ==
The school offers several levels of academics, including Advanced Placement and Dual Credit courses. Cathedral currently offers 32 dual credit courses and a wide variety of dual placement courses through Indiana University, Ivy Tech, and Marian University. Cathedral was honored as a Blue Ribbon School four times, in 1988, 2004, 2016, and 2022. Cathedral was the only high school, public or private, in the state of Indiana to receive a Blue Ribbon designation in 2016. No other high school in the state has received the Blue Ribbon award more times.

== Athletics ==
=== Football ===
For the 2008 Sunday Night Football season on NBC, Cathedral High School's football program was featured because even though the school has more football victories than any school in the state of Indiana, they do not have a home field. Though several games throughout the schedule each year are designated home games, they are played at different fields (such as Indianapolis Arlington High School, Arsenal Technical High School, and the University of Indianapolis) which are not directly affiliated with Cathedral itself. Its two segments aired on November 2 and 9, 2008.

As of the end of the 2013 IHSAA football season, Cathedral had more wins than any other school in the history of the sport in the state of Indiana. The Irish have won over 750 in program history.

As of 2021 Cathedral ranks first on the all-time list for State Finals appearances in Indiana, having reached the title game a total of eighteen times. They won in fourteen of those eighteen appearances (1986, 1992, 1996, 1998, 1999, 2006, 2008, 2010, 2011, 2012, 2013, 2014, 2020, and 2021).

The football team was led by Rick Streiff who coached the team to 9 state championships which ties him for the most championships for a high school football coach in Indiana. In addition to Streiff, the coaching staff is heavily compiled of former NFL and NCAA players such as Mike Prior and Darrick Brownlow.

Since 2017, the football team has been coached by Bill Peebles, who has led the Fighting Irish to two back-to-back 5A IHSAA State Championships in 2020 and 2021 respectively. The Fighting Irish competed in the 5A IHSAA Football Division from 2013 to 2021, which was two classes above their enrollment numbers. They have since competed in Class 6A, the largest of the six classes and still two classes above their enrollment.

=== Girls lacrosse ===
The Cathedral girls lacrosse team has won two State Championships (2015, 2017).

=== Boys lacrosse ===
Head Coach Andy Gruber, an Ohio State lacrosse alum, started the program in 2000 and has been the lone program leader. He has won 5 State Championships (2005, 2013, 2016, 2017 and 2019) and led the Irish to 20 total final four appearances. The program has produced numerous D1 players and All-American selections.

=== Girls volleyball ===
- The Cathedral Lady Irish volleyball team won eight State Championships (1997, 1999, 2001, 2003, 2006, 2008, 2015 and 2016).
- The Cathedral Lady Irish volleyball team won state in 2015. They were named National Champions by MaxPreps.
- The Lady Irish also won state in 2016, and finished first in the national tournament two years in a row (2015 and 2016).

=== Boys volleyball ===
- Cathedral is one of a group of Indianapolis high schools which fields a team and competes in the Indiana Boys Volleyball Coaches Association. Since boys volleyball is not yet a sanctioned IHSAA sport, the IBVCA stands as the sport's sanctioning body.
- Cathedral has won the championship eight times (1999, 2001, 2002, 2004, 2005, 2007, 2008, 2010, 2016) and placed runner-up five times (1994, 1997, 1998, 2003, and 2009).
- Between May 2006 and March 2009, Cathedral had an 82-match win-streak, which is a state record.
- Following the conclusion of each season, various members of both the Varsity and Junior Varsity squads will form one or more club teams. These clubs travel to the USA Volleyball Boys' Junior Championships and compete against hundreds of other boys' volleyball clubs from around the United States of America. In 2007, the Irish Juniors finished a school record 5th in the national tournament.

=== Other sports ===
- Boys and girls Soccer
- Boys and girls Swimming & Diving
- Boys and girls Basketball (Boys 2022(4A)/2026(3A) State Champions)
- Baseball
- Softball
- Boys and girls Lacrosse
- Boys Golf
- Boys Hockey (with seven other high schools as Central Indiana Knights)
- Boys and girls Cross Country
- Boys and girls Track & Field (Girls 2021 State Champions)
- Boys and girls Tennis
- Bowling
- Gymnastics
- Boys Rugby
- Wrestling

== Notable people ==
- Annie Andrews (class of 1998), Senator-elect for South Carolina
- Gregory A. Ballard (class of 1972), Mayor of Indianapolis 2008–2016
- Leo Barnhorst (class of 1942), Notre Dame All American, Ft. Wayne Zollner Pistons NBA player
- Ken Barlow (class of 1982), Notre Dame and professional basketball player
- Blaine Bishop (class of 1988), NFL player, 4-time Pro Bowl safety
- Xavier Booker (class of 2023), college basketball player for UCLA
- Darrick Brownlow (class of 1987), University of Illinois and NFL player
- John Carlson (class of 2008), professional ice hockey player
- Henry Cain (ca. class of 1953), soul-jazz organist
- Mark Clayton (class of 1979), NFL player, 5-time Pro Bowl wide receiver
- Jack Doyle (class of 2008), NFL player for Indianapolis Colts, 2-time Pro Bowl tight end
- Jake Fox (class of 2000), professional baseball player
- Moe Gardner (class of 1986), 2-time NCAA All-American and NFL professional player
- Cole Hocker (class of 2019), 2024 Olympic Gold Medalist in the 1500 meters in Olympic record time, 2021 National Champion and Olympic finalist in the 1500 meters
- Chris Huffins (class of 1988), 2000 Summer Olympics decathlete
- Tommy Hunter (class of 2005), Major League baseball player for Tampa Bay Rays, New York Mets
- Ted Karras (class of 2011), NFL lineman for Cincinnati Bengals, 2-time Super Bowl champion
- Mathias Kiwanuka (class of 2001), NFL player for New York Giants, 2-time Super Bowl champion
- Terry McLaurin (class of 2014), wide receiver for the Washington Commanders
- James E. Muller (class of 1961), co-founder International Physicians for the Prevention of Nuclear War.^{[1]} This organization was awarded the Nobel Peace Prize in 1985
- Danny O'Neil (class of 2024), college football quarterback for the Wisconsin Badgers
- Ray Oyler (class of 1955), professional baseball player for 1968 World Series champion Detroit Tigers
- Samantha Peszek (class of 2010), Olympic silver medalist gymnast
- Dillon Peters (class of 2011), pitcher for Miami Marlins, Los Angeles Angels
- Tanya Walton Pratt (class of 1977), federal judge
- Micah Shrewsberry (class of 1995), Head Coach, University of Notre Dame men's basketball
- Jaron Tibbs (class of 2023), college football wide receiver for the Kansas State Wildcats
- Jeremy Trueblood (class of 2001), NFL football player
- Sean Woods (class of 1988), basketball head coach of Morehead State
- Pete Werner (class of 2017), NFL football player for New Orleans Saints

== See also ==
- List of schools in Indianapolis
- List of high schools in Indiana
