= Kadin Semonza =

American football player (born 2005)

No. 3 – Tulane Green Wave
- Position: Quarterback
- Class: (redshirt) Junior

Personal information
- Born: February 4, 2005 (age 21)
- Listed height: 5 ft 11 in (1.80 m)
- Listed weight: 196 lb (89 kg)

Career information
- High school: Mission Viejo (Mission Viejo, California)
- College: Ball State (2023–2024); Tulane (2025–present)

Awards and highlights
- MAC Freshman of the Year (2024)
- Stats at ESPN

Kadin Semonza (born February 4, 2005) is an American college football quarterback for the Tulane Green Wave. He previously played for the Ball State Cardinals.

== Early life ==
Semonza grew up in Huntington Beach, California and attended Mission Viejo High School in Mission Viejo, California. During his high school career, he totaled 6,709 career yards and 77 touchdowns, before committing to play college football at Ball State University.

== College career ==
=== Ball State ===
In Semonza's first career collegiate game against Kentucky, he completed 15 passes for 165 yards and touchdown. The following week, he made his first career start against Georgia. Semonza finished his true freshman season passing for 480 yards, three touchdowns, and five interceptions. Entering the 2024 season, he was named the Cardinals starting quarterback. Semonza started 12 games in 2024, throwing for 2,904 yards and 25 touchdowns, being named the MAC Freshman of the Year. On December 9, 2024, he announced that he would enter the transfer portal.

=== Tulane ===
On January 5, 2025, Semonza announced his decision to transfer to Tulane University to play for the Tulane Green Wave.

=== Statistics ===
Year	Team	Games			Passing								Rushing			
Year	Team	GP	GS	Record	Cmp	Att	Pct	Yds	Y/A	TD	Int	Rtg	Att	Yds	Avg	TD
2023	Ball State	4	3	1–2	50	82	61.0	480	5.8	3	5	110.0	17	10	0.6	0
2024	Ball State	12	11	2–9	275	427	64.4	2,904	8.2	25	10	136.2	54	−85	−1.6	1
2025	Tulane	0	0	—	DNP											
2026	Tulane	3	3	2–1	50	93	53.8	646	6.9	3	1	120.2	26	–51	–2.0	1
Career		19	17	4–11	375	601	62.4	4,030	6.7	31	16	130.4	97	–126	-1.3	2
