= Patrick Overmyer =

American football player (born 2005)

No. 9 – Houston Cougars
- Position: Tight end
- Class: Redshirt Junior

Personal information
- Born: May 2, 2005 (age 21); Kingwood, Texas, U.S.
- Listed height: 6 ft 5 in (1.96 m)
- Listed weight: 240 lb (109 kg)

Career information
- High school: Kingwood Park (Houston, Texas)
- College: UTSA (2023–2025); Houston (2026–present)
- Stats at ESPN

Patrick Overmyer (born May 2, 2005) is an American college football tight end for the Houston Cougars. He previously played for the UTSA Roadrunners.

== Early life ==
Overmyer was born on May 2, 2005, in Kingwood, Texas. He attended Kingwood Park High School where he competed in football and baseball. At Kingwood, he served as the starting quarterback for the football team. In his senior year, he threw for 2,028 yards and 24 touchdowns while running for 631 yards and 14 touchdowns, earning first-team all-district honors while helping Kingwood Park to a playoff appearance. As a quarterback, Overmyer had little attention as a college recruit, only receiving one offer to walk-on. He changed his position to tight end and was ranked a three-star tight end recruit before committing to play college football for the UTSA Roadrunners.

== College career ==
Overmyer appeared in five games as a true freshman for UTSA in 2023 and redshirted. The following year, he was named a first-team Freshman All-American by The Athletic after posting 30 receptions for 283 yards and three touchdowns. In 2025, he played in 13 games and caught 27 passes for 344 yards and five touchdowns. Overmyer was also used by the Roadrunners as a quarterback on "tush push" plays.

Overmyer entered the NCAA transfer portal after the 2025 season and transferred to the Houston Cougars in 2026. In the sixth game of the 2026 season for Houston, against Kansas State, Overmyer caught eight passes for 83 yards and four touchdowns, setting a school record for single-game touchdowns by a tight end.

=== Statistics ===
Year	Team	GP	Receiving			
Year	Team	GP	Rec	Yds	Avg	TD
2023	UTSA	5	0	0	0.0	0
2024	UTSA	13	31	283	9.1	3
2025	UTSA	13	27	344	12.7	5
2026	Houston	11	58	663	11.4	8
Career		42	116	1,290	11.1	16

== Personal life ==
Overmyer's cousin is former Notre Dame and NFL tight end, Kyle Rudolph.
