= Rodney Fields Jr. =

American football player (born 2004)

No. 20 – Kansas State Wildcats
- Position: Running back
- Class: Redshirt Sophomore

Personal information
- Born: November 11, 2004 (age 21)
- Listed height: 5 ft 10 in (1.78 m)
- Listed weight: 205 lb (93 kg)

Career information
- High school: Del City (Del City, Oklahoma)
- College: Oklahoma State (2024–2025); Kansas State (2026–present)
- Stats at ESPN

Rodney Fields Jr. (born November 11, 2004) is an American college football running back for the Kansas State Wildcats. He previously played for the Oklahoma State Cowboys.

== Early life ==
Fields attended Del City High School in Del City, Oklahoma. As a senior, he rushed for 1,156 yards and 18 touchdowns. After graduating, Fields committed to play college football at Oklahoma State University.

== College career ==
Fields played sparingly as a freshman, playing in four games and recording 21 carries for 99 yards and a touchdown. The following season, he made his first career start against Tulsa, rushing for 113 yards on 17 carries. Fields finished the 2025 season totaling 614 yards and a touchdown. Following the conclusion of the season, he entered the transfer portal.

On January 5, 2026, Fields announced his decision to transfer to Kansas State University to play for the Kansas State Wildcats.

=== Statistics ===
College statistics
Season	Team	Games	Rushing				Receiving			
Season	Team	GP	Att	Yards	Avg	TD	Rec	Yards	Avg	TD
2024	Oklahoma State	4	21	99	4.7	1	2	23	11.5	0
2025	Oklahoma State	9	124	614	5.0	1	28	276	9.9	1
2026	Kansas State	2	27	206	7.6	2	1	3	3.0	0
Career		15	172	919	5.3	4	31	302	9.7	1
