= Linkon Cure =

American football cornerback

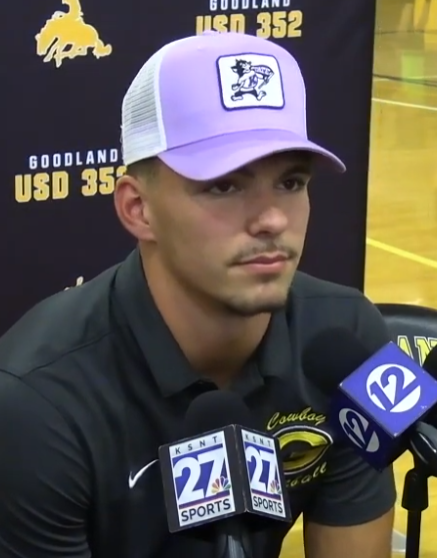
- Cure in 2024

No. 0 – Kansas State Wildcats
- Position: Tight end
- Class: Freshman

Personal information
- Listed height: 6 ft 5 in (1.96 m)
- Listed weight: 245 lb (111 kg)

Career information
- High school: Goodland (Goodland, Kansas)
- College: Kansas State (2025—present)
- Stats at ESPN

Linkon Cure is an American college football tight end for the Kansas State Wildcats.

== Early life ==
Cure grew up in Goodland, Kansas and attended Goodland High School, where he played basketball and football and competed as a hurdler in track and field. He played quarterback and running back during his freshman season and did not see much playing time. Cure suffered a hamstring injury and only played in four games during his sophomore season. As a junior, Cure caught 42 passes for 946 yards and 14 touchdowns. Cure was selected to play in the 2025 All-American Bowl.

In track and field, Cure has won state titles in both the 110-meter and the 300-meter hurdles. He also plays basketball at Goodland. Cure averaged 11.2 points, 5.7 rebounds, and 2.1 assists per game during his junior season as the Cowboys went to the Class 3A championship game.

Cure was initially rated a four-star recruit and one of the top tight end prospects in the 2025 recruiting class. He was later reranked as a five-star prospect by 247Sports. Cure committed to play college football at Kansas State over offers from Oregon, Texas A&M, and Kansas. Cure is the highest-rated recruit in Kansas State history.

== Personal life ==
Cure's older brother, Leyton, currently plays tight end at Kansas after beginning his college career at Fort Hays State. His older sister, Lindsey, plays college volleyball at Regis University.
