= Jaron Tibbs =

American football player (born 2005)

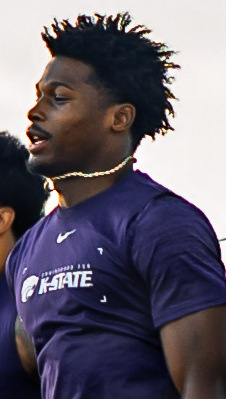
- Tibbs in 2026

No. 12 – Kansas State Wildcats
- Position: Wide receiver
- Class: Senior

Personal information
- Born: February 2, 2005 (age 21)
- Listed height: 6 ft 3 in (1.91 m)
- Listed weight: 210 lb (95 kg)

Career information
- High school: Cathedral (Indianapolis, Indiana)
- College: Purdue (2023–2024); Kansas State (2025–present)
- Stats at ESPN

Jaron Tibbs (born February 2, 2005) is an American football wide receiver for the Kansas State Wildcats. He previously played for the Purdue Boilermakers.

== Early life ==
Tibbs attended Cathedral High School in Indianapolis, Indiana. As a junior, he caught 66 passes for 1,105 yards and ten touchdowns. Coming out of high school, Tibbs committed to play college football for the Purdue Boilermakers over Iowa.

== College career ==
As a freshman in 2023, Tibbs notched five receptions for 42 yards in eight games. In 2024, he hauled in 25 receptions for 305 yards and two touchdowns. After the 2024 season, Tibbs entered the NCAA transfer portal.

Tibbs transferred to play for the Kansas State Wildcats. In 2025, he had 47 receptions for 595 yards and three touchdowns.
