= Lucas–Johnston House =

Historic house in Rhode Island, United States

- U.S. National Register of Historic Places
- U.S. National Historic Landmark District – Contributing property
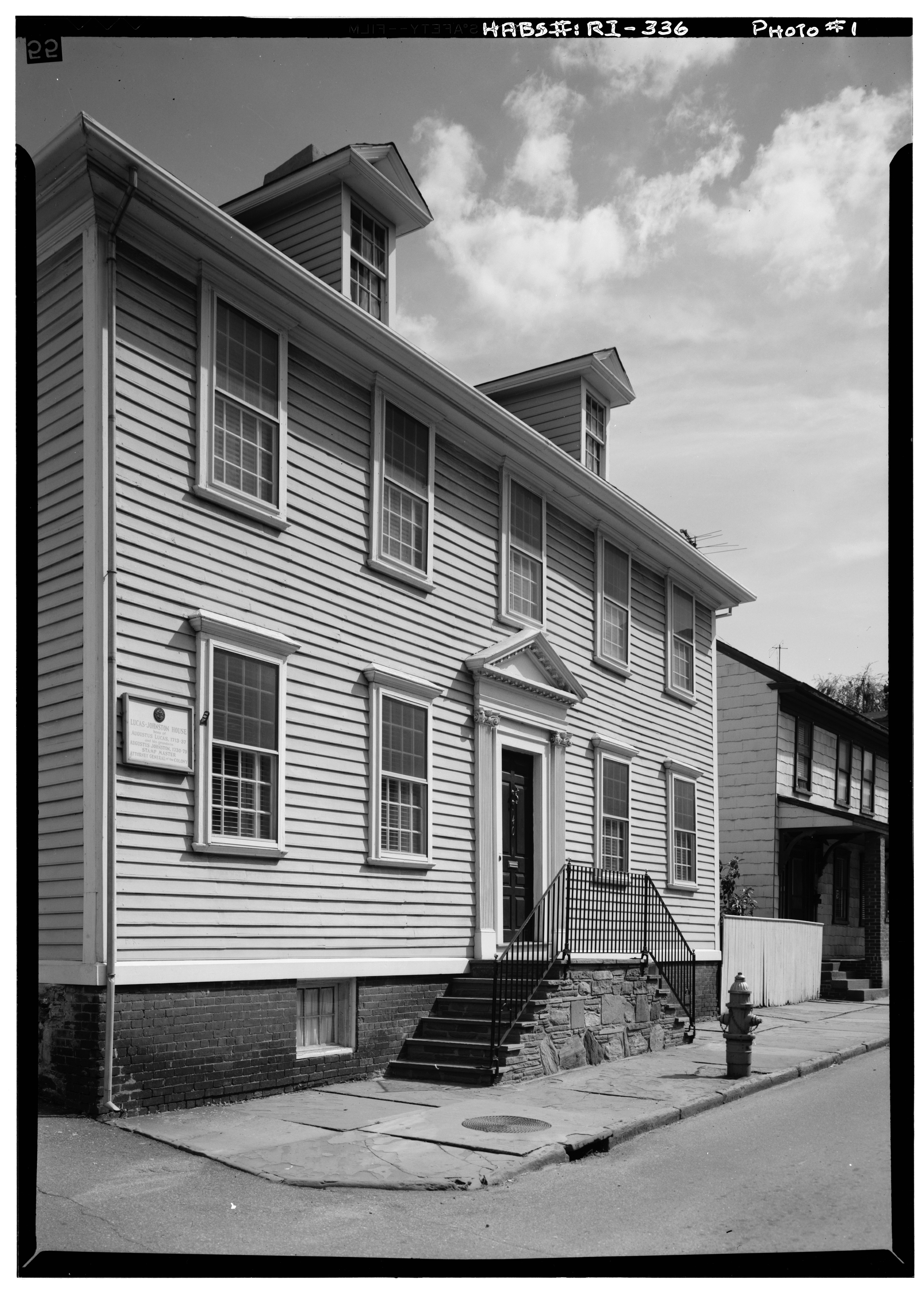

- Location within Rhode Island Location within the United States
- Location: 40 Division Street, Newport, Rhode Island
- Coordinates: 41°29′19″N 71°18′45″W
- Built: 1713
- Architectural style: American Colonial
- Part of: Newport Historic District (ID68000001)
- NRHP reference No.: 71000024

Significant dates
- Added to NRHP: May 6, 1971
- Designated NHLDCP: November 24, 1968

The Lucas–Johnston House (also known as Augustus Lucas House) is an historic colonial house in downtown Newport, Rhode Island.

== History of building ==
Dendrochronology surveys were conducted on the house showing that the trees felled in its constructed were from Circa 1650, Summer 1714, and Winter 1759/60. An architectural and dendrochronology study concluded that

"the house has two interior chimneys, but they are placed front to back rather than side to side [as was normal in eighteenth century Georgian style houses]... the rear chimney, with its kitchen fireplace, is the one with more age. The foundation walls appear to be of one unified build rather that parts of an earlier building combined with a later construction. Exterior walls, particularly on the north and west walls are studded construction and also have brick nogging. Both of these techniques are quite uncommon for Newport...There are a couple of strange datings ranging from 1618 to 1634...while nothing dating from the first quarter of the 18th century shows in the results, with the exception of a single felling of 1714."

== History of occupants ==
It was the home to French Huguenot settler, Augustus Lucas, a slave trader and attorney, and later his grandson, Augustus Johnston, who was a Tory who served as Rhode Island Attorney General and is the namesake of Johnston, Rhode Island. The house was added to the National Register of Historic Places in 1971.

== See also ==
- Oldest buildings in Rhode Island
- National Register of Historic Places listings in Newport County, Rhode Island
