= Joseph Polisena Jr. =

American politician

Joseph Polisena

Mayor of Johnston
- Incumbent
- Assumed office January 2023
- Preceded by: Joe Polisena

Personal details
- Born: 1989 or 1990 (age 35–36)
- Political party: Democratic
- Relatives: Joe Polisena (father)
- Education: Rhode Island College (BA); Roger Williams University (JD)

Joseph M. Polisena Jr. (born 1989/1990) is an American attorney and politician who is serving as the mayor of Johnston, Rhode Island. The son of former state senator and Johnston mayor Joe Polisena, he succeeded his father as mayor in 2023. He is a member of the Democratic Party and previously served on the town council beginning in 2019.

== Early life and education ==
Joseph Polisena Jr. was born in 1989 or 1990, the son of Joe Polisena, who would go on to serve in the Rhode Island Senate and as the mayor of Johnston, Rhode Island. The junior Polisena earned a bachelor's degree from the Rhode Island College, where he studied criminal justice, and graduated from the Roger Williams University School of Law.

== Legal career ==
According to his LinkedIn profile, Polisena Jr. worked as a lawyer for the Rhode Island Public Defender from late 2016 to late 2018; worked in private practice from late 2018 to early 2021; and served as a legislative counsel for around two years. He worked for Republican politician and gubernatorial candidate Allan Fung while Fung was mayor of Cranston, and was also involved on a gubernatorial campaign. He joined the administration of Democratic Party governor Dan McKee as deputy counsel in early 2021 and left the following year to focus on a campaign for mayor of Johnston.

== Political career ==
=== Johnston town council ===
In 2018, Polisena Jr. was elected to Johnston's town council, and began his tenure in January 2019. Within the two-year term, he served as its vice president. Leading up to the 2020 presidential election between incumbent Republican president Donald Trump and former vice president Joe Biden, Polisena Jr. spoke to the Boston Globe on why voters in Johnston voted for Trump in the 2016 election. He stated that he would be "staying blue" and would vote for Biden in the 2020 election. A columnist in the Boston Globe wrote that it was the younger Polisena who "helped move the ball on the Amazon project [to build a warehouse in the town] after his father admittedly lost his temper with state officials."

=== Mayor of Johnston ===
==== Election ====
In a 2020 interview, Polisena Jr. stated he was preparing to run for Johnston mayor to succeed his father, Joe Polisena, in 2022, as his father was restricted by term limits. In early 2022, a self-reported $156,749 had been raised from donors in the state senate, among other organizations, for his campaign. He launched his campaign in May. The Boston Globe observed "nominal competition" in the race. Polisena Jr. emerged victorious with 69% of the vote. He was sworn in in January 2023.

Johnston mayoral election, 2022
| Party | Candidate | Votes | % |
|---|---|---|---|
| Democratic | Joseph Polisena Jr | 7,186 | 69.6 |
| Independent | Karen Chadwick | 1,705 | 16.5 |
| Independent | Brenda Leone | 1,430 | 13.9 |
| Total votes | | 10,321 | 100.0 |

==== Tenure ====
Days he was sworn into his office, Polisena Jr. ended the town's contract to publish legal notices in the town's free weekly newspaper, the Johnston Sun Rise, to have them advertised in the statewide Providence Journal. The Sun Rise's publisher later told the Boston Globe that Polisena Jr. had privately stated his intention to end the contract while expressing his disapproval of the newspaper's critical coverage of him. Polisena Jr. confirmed that he had met with the publisher, but denied asking for the firing of the newspaper's journalist under the threat of ending the contract.

Speaking to a Providence Journal columnist, Polisena Jr. expressed his dismay with Trump's victory in the 2024 presidential election. Among other comments, he blamed the Democratic Party with losing touch with working class people, and accused the campaign of Kamala Harris, the Democratic presidential nominee, of erring by "focusing on things like identity politics – from trans rights to calling Trump a racist – rather than more universal issues". In late 2024, Polisena Jr. expressed his opposition to a proposed affordable housing project in Johnston that qualified for the state's Low and Moderate Income Housing Act and thus inhibited the town's ability to block the project. At a town council meeting, he requested that they allow him to take the land by eminent domain, so that it can instead be used for a public safety complex and new town hall, both funded by ending plans for a new high school.

Political offices
| Preceded by Joe Polisena | Mayor of Johnston; 2023–present | Incumbent |
