= Hughesdale =

Hughesdale may refer to:

- Hughesdale, Victoria, Australia; a suburb of Melbourne
- Hughesdale railway station, Melbourne, Victoria, Australia
- Hughesdale, Rhode Island, USA; a neighborhood of Johnston

== See also ==
- Hughes (disambiguation)
- Hugh (disambiguation)
- Dale (disambiguation)
