= Thomas H. Hughes House =

Historic house in Rhode Island, United States

- U.S. National Register of Historic Places
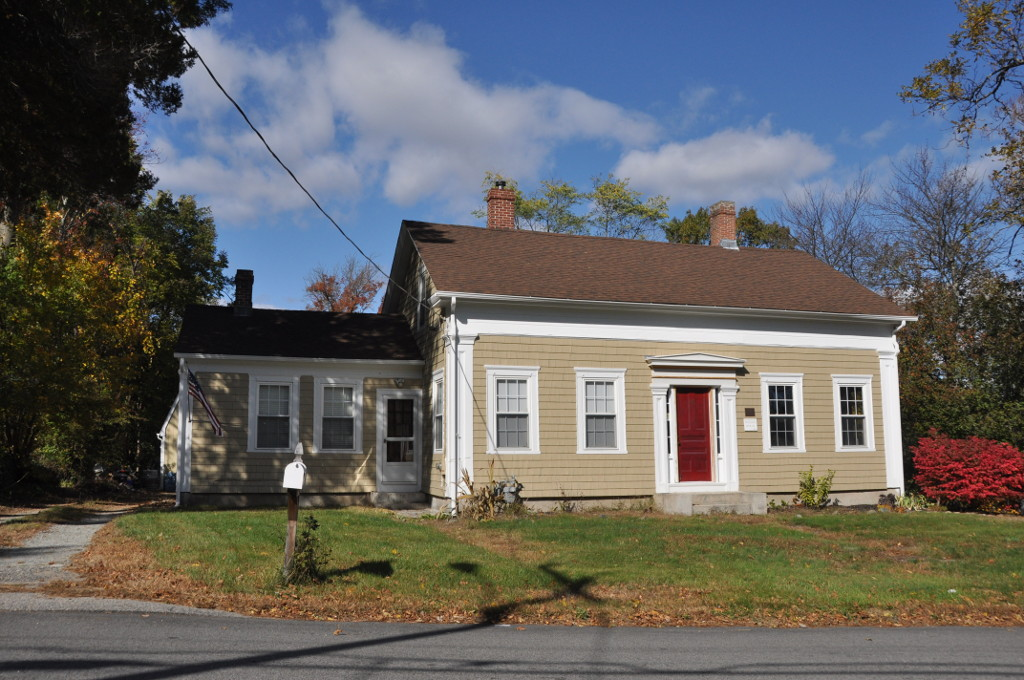

- Location within Rhode Island Location within the United States
- Location: 423 Central Avenue, Johnston, Rhode Island
- Coordinates: 41°48′28″N 71°29′51″W
- Architectural style: Greek Revival
- NRHP reference No.: 79000056
- Added to NRHP: June 15, 1979

The Thomas H. Hughes House is a historic house in Johnston, Rhode Island. The 1 1/2-story wood-frame house was built c. 1845 by Zacharias French, and exhibits simple but well-proportioned Greek Revival style. The house is most notable as the residence for some years of Thomas H. Hughes, owner of a local dye processing factory and for whom the Hughesdale neighborhood of Johnston is named. He apparently lived in this house until 1877, when he had a larger house (no longer extant) built.

The house was listed on the National Register of Historic Places in 1979.

== See also ==
- National Register of Historic Places listings in Providence County, Rhode Island
