= Frog City, Rhode Island =

Village in Johnston, Rhode Island, USA

Frog City is a village within the Town of Johnston, Rhode Island which overlaps another village, Thornton, Rhode Island. According to one source, the village was "probably termed Frog City because of the numerous frogs along the Pocasset River and ponds near Victoria Mill at Mill Street and Victoria Mount". Frog City is bordered by Mill St. to the North, Plainfield Pike to the East and South, and Rachela St. to the West.

The British Hosiery Mill, later known as the Priscilla Worsted Mill, was built in Frog City in 1884, on Mill Street. The Victoria Mill at the corner of John Street and Victoria Mount was the largest of the mills in the area. Both buildings were standing and still in use in 2025.
