= Belknap School =

Historical building in Johnston, Rhode Island

Coordinates: 41°50′50″N 71°30′00″W

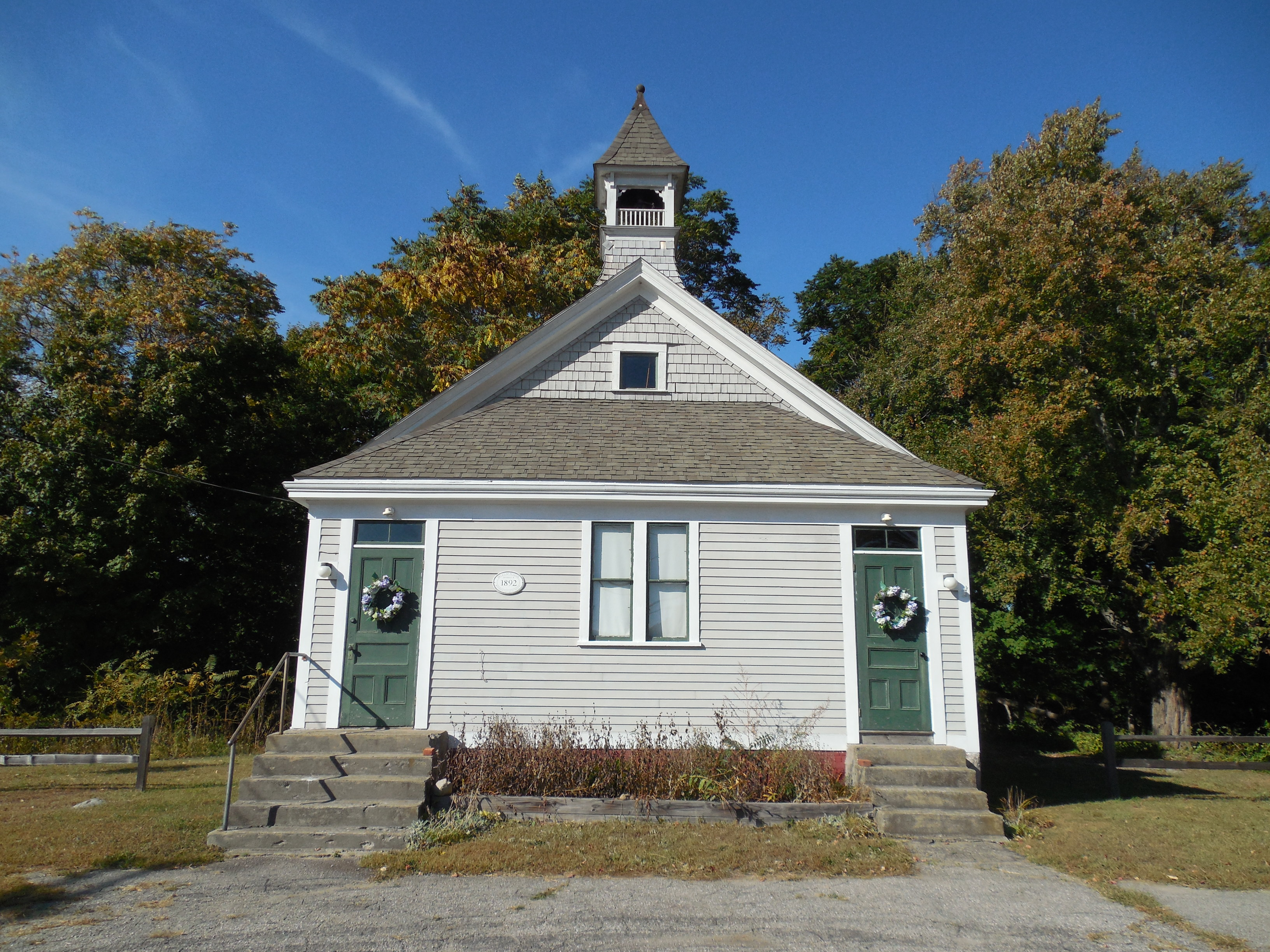
Belknap School

Belknap School (also known as the District No. 8 School House) is a historic former school house at 509 Greenville Avenue in the Belknap village of Johnston, Rhode Island.

The first school on the site was built in 1790 and was the first school in the town when it was founded. The current school building was built on the same site in 1892 and was used as a school until 1938. It was used as an American Legion building from the late 1940s until 1998. In 2002 the building was acquired by the Johnston Historical Society. The building was added to the National Register of Historic Places in 2010.

== See also ==
- National Register of Historic Places listings in Providence County, Rhode Island
