= Augustus Johnston =

American lawyer

Augustus Johnston (ca. 1729 – 1790) was an Attorney General in the Colony of Rhode Island and Providence Plantations from 1758 to 1766 and is the namesake of Johnston, Rhode Island. He also served briefly as a stamp distributor during the controversial Stamp Act 1765 protests and later fled Rhode Island after the Revolutionary War due to his Tory sympathies.

== Early life and career ==
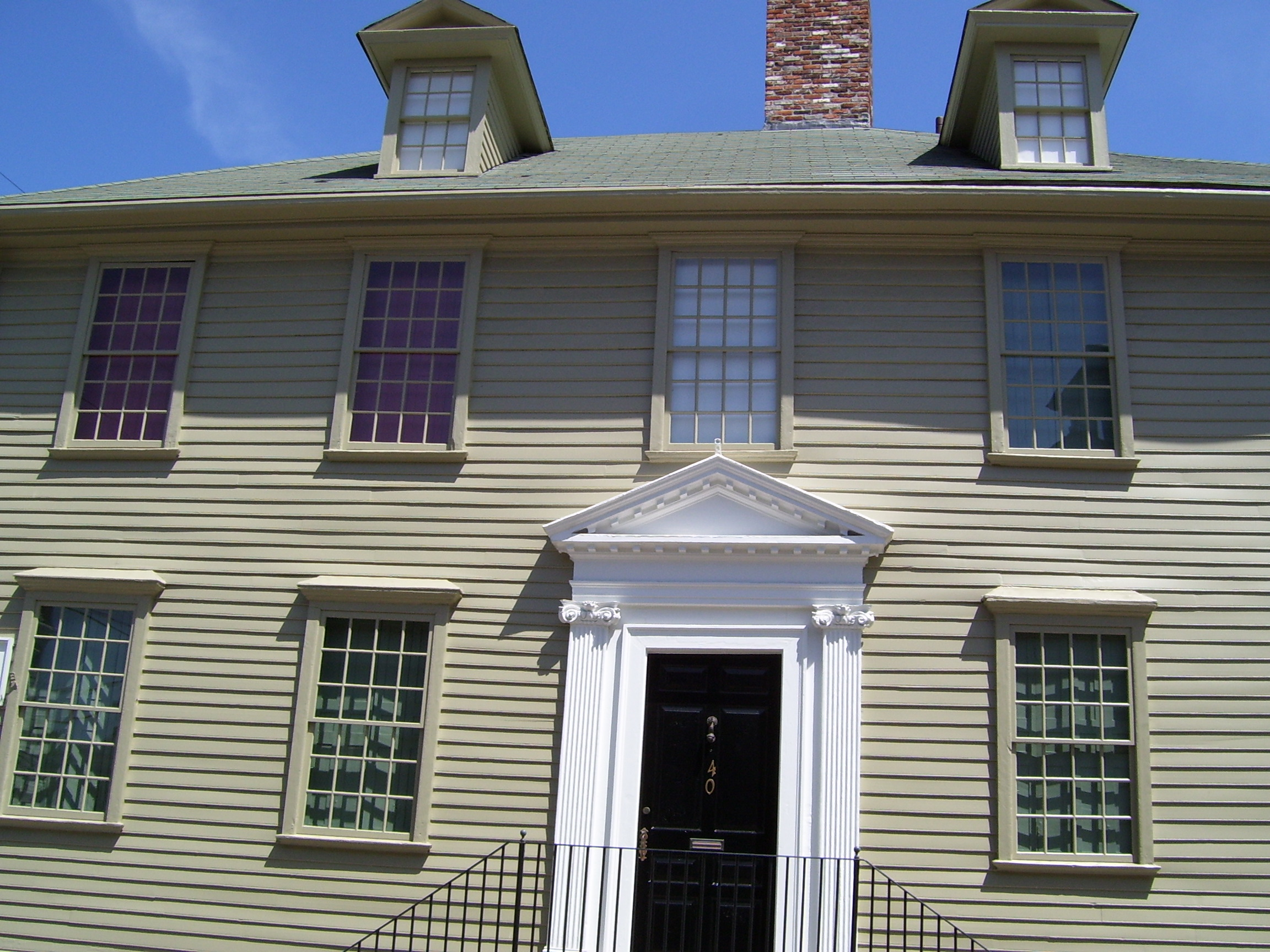
The Lucas–Johnston House in Newport was built by Johnston's grandfather in 1712

Johnston was born near Perth Amboy, New Jersey around 1729 to George Johnston and Bathsheba Lucas. His paternal grandfather emigrated from Scotland. Johnston's father died when he was young and his mother remarried to Matthew Robinson. Johnston was eventually educated in New York before moving to Newport, Rhode Island, where he became a voter on April 30, 1751. Johnston studied law with his step-father, Matthew Robinson, a prominent, well-read Rhode Island lawyer with a large private library. Johnston's maternal grandfather, Augustus Lucas, a French Huguenot also lived in Newport and built the Lucas–Johnston House, which Johnston later inherited. After building a successful reputation as an attorney, Augustus Johnston was appointed in 1754 and again in 1756 to assist in drafting legislation for General Assembly. In October 1756 Johnston became a first lieutenant in a military regiment to be sent against Fort Crown Point during the French and Indian War. In June 1757 he was acting as attorney-general because the candidate elected died, and he was then reelected each year until May 1766. As Attorney General he helped to revise the colony's laws and worked to start a smallpox inoculation hospital. When the town of Johnston separated from Providence in 1759, it was purportedly named for the Attorney General.

== Stamp Act and American Revolution ==
In 1765, Johnston served as a stamp-distributor under the Stamp Act 1765. On August 27, 1765 Johnston and two others who had supported the rights of the Parliament of Great Britain were hanged in effigy and the next day a mob damaged their homes and rioted outside the Newport Colony House. The three individuals fled to a naval ship, HMS Cygnet, moored in Newport's harbor. Johnston came ashore the next day and signed a document agreeing not to act as stamp distributor without the colonists' consent. The other two refugees fled to England and requested compensation for their damages and informed the British government of their losses. Johnston also requested compensation, and all three were accused of inflating their claimed losses. The British Treasury requested that the Rhode Island General Assembly pay the claims, but the Rhode Island government refused until the British Treasury reimbursed Rhode Island for their expenditures during the French and Indian War in 1756, which had never been repaid. Negotiations over the claims took place until 1773 but were never settled.

Augustus Johnston remained in Newport until July 18, 1776, but when he refused the Patriots' oath of allegiance he was ordered interned at South Kingstown for a time. During the British occupation of Newport, he was appointed to various civil positions, but he moved to New York when the British left Newport in 1779 and then possibly South Carolina. Johnston's property was eventually confiscated. Although he had a pension from the British government, Johnston died insolvent in 1790 leaving a widow and four children. Despite his advanced age, Johnston's step-father, who had been Johnston's surety, had to defend various suits which were brought against him.
