= Belknap, Rhode Island =

Village in Johnston, Rhode Island, U.S.

Coordinates: 41.848066°N 71.505486°W

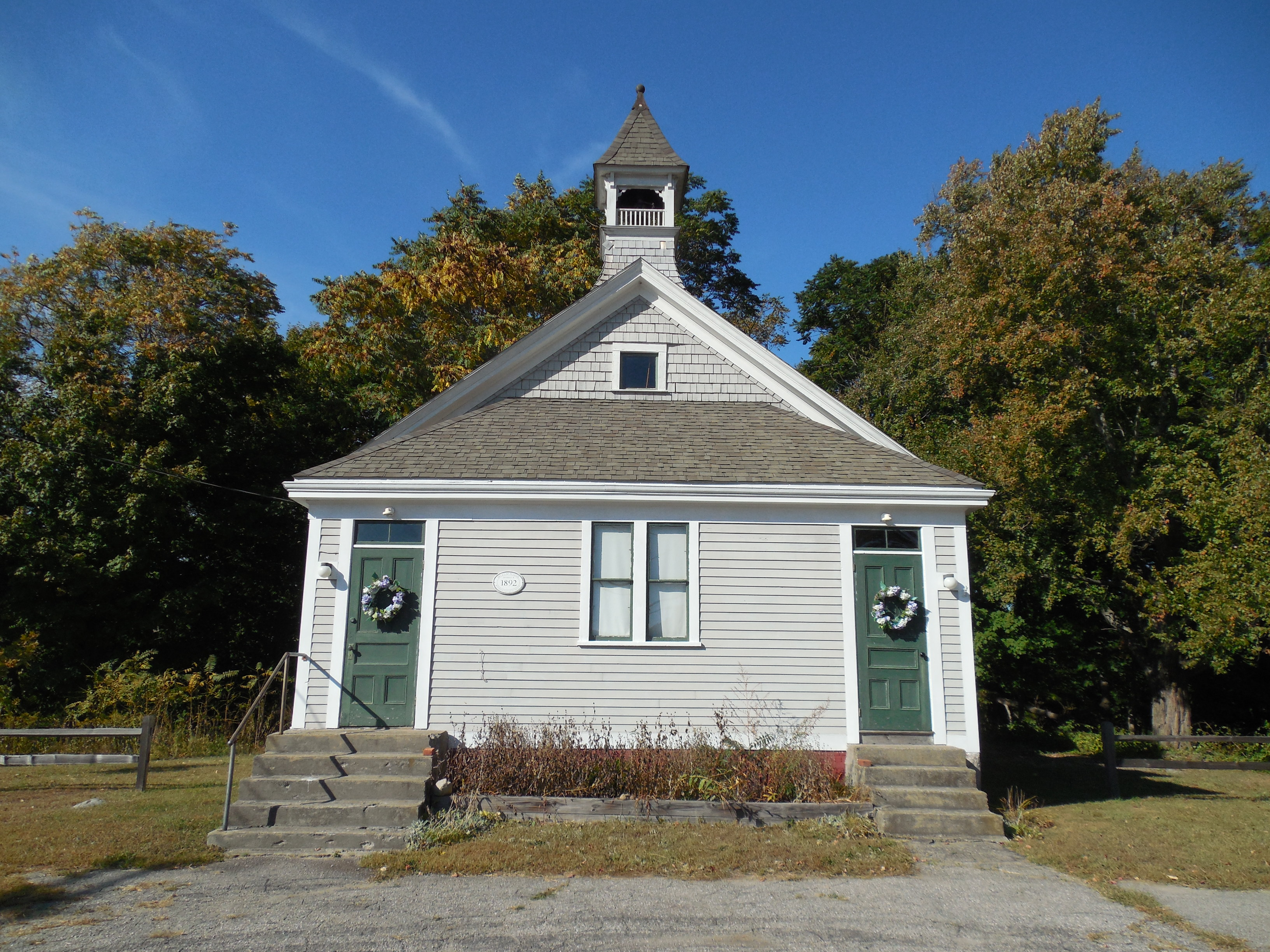
Belknap School

Belknap is a village within the city of Johnston in Rhode Island.

On April 18, 1759, the citizens of Johnston held the first Town Meeting at Benjamin Belknap's house on Greenville Avenue in Belknap, and Abraham Belknap was appointed as the town's first Town Sergeant at the meeting. In 1771 the Baptist Meeting House in Belknap opened, and is believed to be the first place of worship in Johnston. In 1790 the Belknap School the first school in Johnston was founded.
