= Hughesdale, Rhode Island =

Neighborhood in Johnston, Rhode Island, US

Coordinates: 41°48′31″N 71°29′39″W

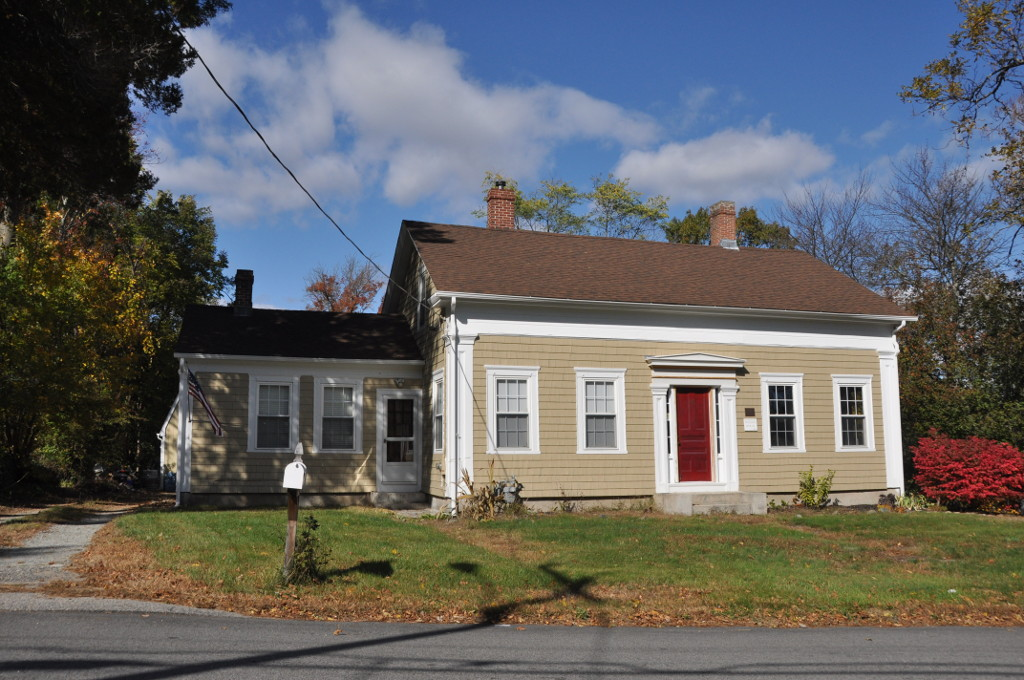
The Thomas H. Hughes House

Hughesdale is a neighborhood in the town of Johnston, Rhode Island. Hughesdale is a primarily residential neighborhood in the southeast corner of the town, centered near Central Avenue and Atwood Avenue. It is situated near the villages of Simmonsville, also in Johnston, and the village of Thornton in Cranston.

== History ==
The neighborhood is named for the local 19th-century mill owner Thomas Henry Hughes, an Englishman who arrived in America first to Pawtucket, Rhode Island in 1839, and later to Johnston in 1849. Thomas Hughes established what would later be known as the Hughesdale Dye and Chemical Works on the Dry Brook, a tributary of the Pocasset River, in 1850. Hughesdale grew as a small mill village around the chemical works. Much of the village including the mill was destroyed by a flood in 1868, but the mill was quickly rebuilt larger than before. Hughes set up a post office at his store in 1876, and the Hughesdale Congregational Church was established the following year. By 1878, the village was occupied by some 300 inhabitants, and the mill employed over 50 men. Thomas Hughes died in 1883, and two of his four sons took over the business. The Hughes Chemical Works was destroyed a second time in a fire in 1914.

The Thomas H. Hughes House is one of the few buildings still standing from the community's early era. The building was built in 1845 and is listed on the U.S. National Register of Historic Places.
