= Graniteville, Rhode Island =

Village in Johnston, Rhode Island, U.S.

Coordinates: 41°58′05″N 71°40′48″W

Graniteville is a village located within the town of Johnston, Rhode Island, United States.

During the Revolutionary War, Graniteville was the site of Rhode Island's only gunpowder mill, which was funded by the Rhode Island General Assembly and run by James Goff until it exploded in 1779, killing Goff and destroying the mill. Graniteville was home to a large granite quarry in the 1800s, and the columns for the Providence Arcade, the first indoor shopping mall in America, were quarried in the village in 1822. In the nineteenth century, the village was located on the Providence and Springfield Railroad. Until 1843–1846, the village was home to a Baptist church that was affiliated with the Six Principle Baptists. In 1943, a World War II memorial was dedicated in the village, and every year a well-attended memorial service is held at the Graniteville Baptist Church honoring the area's veterans.
