= Joe Polisena =

American politician (born 1954)

Joseph M. Polisena

4th Mayor of Johnston, Rhode Island
- In office January 8, 2007 – January 9, 2023
- Preceded by: William Macera
- Succeeded by: Joseph Polisena, Jr

Member of the Rhode Island Senate from the 25th district
- In office January 7, 2003 – January 3, 2007
- Preceded by: Donna M. Walsh
- Succeeded by: Christopher Maselli

Member of the Rhode Island Senate from the 28th district
- In office January 2, 2001 – January 7, 2003
- Preceded by: William P. Tocco Jr.
- Succeeded by: Elizabeth H. Roberts

Member of the Rhode Island Senate from the 28th district
- In office January 5, 1993 – January 5, 1999
- Preceded by: Gregory J. Acciardo
- Succeeded by: William P. Tocco Jr.

Personal details
- Born: June 27, 1954 (age 72) Providence, Rhode Island, U.S.
- Party: Democratic
- Spouse: Lucille Polisena
- Children: Joseph Polisena Jr.
- Education: Community College of Rhode Island (AS); Roger Williams University (BA); Cambridge College (MEd)

Joseph M. Polisena (born June 27, 1954) is an American politician from Rhode Island. He served in the Rhode Island Senate from 1993 to 1999 and again from 2001 to 2007. He served as mayor of the Town of Johnston from 2007 until he was succeeded by his son, Joseph Polisena Jr., in 2023. He is a Democrat.

== Early life and education ==
Polisena was born to Julia Marie and Joseph Anthony Polisena on June 27, 1954. He graduated from Johnston High School in Johnston, Rhode Island in 1972. In 1985, Polisena graduated from the Community College of Rhode Island with an associate degree in nursing. In 1988, he earned a Bachelor of Arts in health services from Roger Williams University in Bristol.

In 1998, he completed a Master of Education through Cambridge College.

== Career ==
He was employed by the Community College of Rhode Island as a registered nurse and assistant professor. He also worked as a nurse at the Our Lady of Fatima Hospital. He worked as a firefighter for the Johnston Fire Department.

=== Rhode Island Senate ===
Polisena served a total of twelve years in the Rhode Island Senate, from 1993 to 1999 and from 2001 to 2007. He served as Deputy Majority Leader. He served on a state commission studying improvements to the state fire code following a fatal 2003 fire, and he sponsored a 2005 bill to clarify and strengthen the state's fire code.

=== Mayor of Johnston ===
Polisena served on a panel that studied Rhode Island's municipal pension system as one of the three required municipal officials, along with then-Mayor Angel Taveras of Providence and twelve other individuals. He has been an outspoken proponent of pension reform throughout the state. He has proposed a plan to freeze cost of living adjustments (COLAs) in retirees' pensions. Polisena was a strong supporter of Governor Lincoln Chafee's Municipal Relief Package for the cities and towns of Rhode Island. Polisena did not seek reelection in 2022, and he endorsed his son, Town Council Vice President Joseph Polisena Jr., who went on to win the general election. Polisena Jr. served as Polisena's 2012 campaign manager.

=== Personal life ===
He is married to Lucille "Lucy" Polisena. He was succeeded by his son, Joseph Polisena Jr., as mayor of Johnston in 2023.

Rhode Island Senate
Preceded by Gregory J. Acciardo	Member of the Rhode Island Senate from the 28th district 1993–1999	Succeeded by William P. Tocco Jr.
Preceded by William P. Tocco Jr.	Member of the Rhode Island Senate from the 28th district 2001–2003	Succeeded by Elizabeth H. Roberts
Preceded by Donna M. Walsh	Member of the Rhode Island Senate from the 25th district 2003–2007	Succeeded by Christopher Maselli
Political offices
Preceded by William Macera	Mayor of Johnston, Rhode Island; 2007–2023	Succeeded by Joseph Polisena Jr.
