= Central Landfill =

Coordinates: 41.807°N 71.537°W

- Superfund site
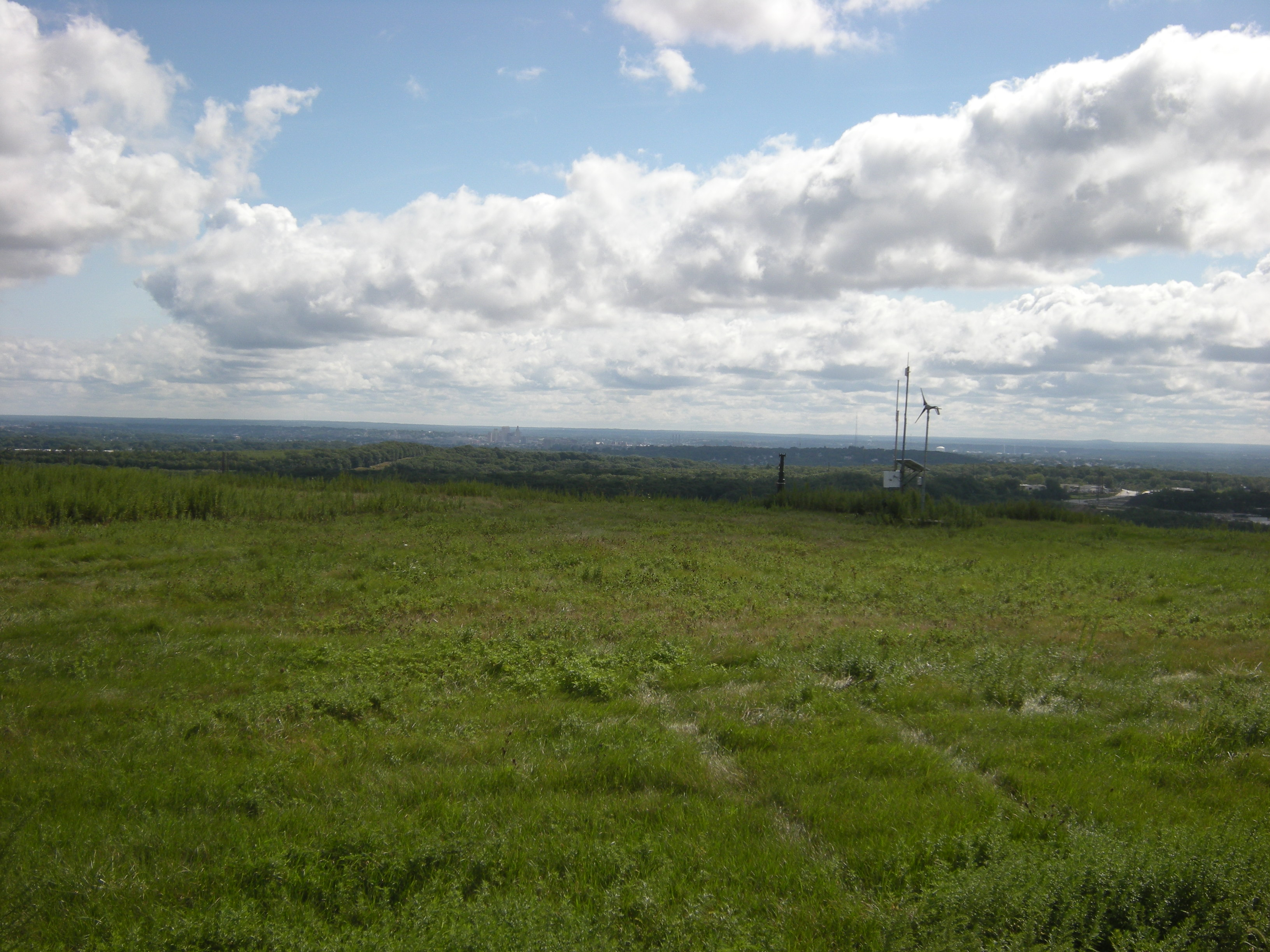
- View from the top of Central Landfill, looking east

- Location within Rhode Island Location within USA Midwest and Northeast Location within the United States
- Location: Johnston, Providence, Rhode Island

Information
- CERCLIS ID: RID980520183
- Contaminants: Arsenic, benzene, cadmium, beryllium, lead, mercury
- Responsible parties: Rhode Island Resource Recovery Corporation (RIRRC)

Progress
- Proposed: October 15, 1984
- Listed: June 10, 1986
- Construction completed: September 28, 2006

The Central Landfill is a 154-acre (62 ha) waste disposal site in Johnston, Rhode Island. It is the state's only landfill and receives more than 90% of the state's solid waste. It has been on the Environmental Protection Agency's Superfund National Priorities List since 1986. The site is owned and operated by the Rhode Island Resource Recovery Corporation (RIRRC).

== Description ==
It is the state's only landfill and receives more than 90% of the state's solid waste.

As of 2014, the landfill receives about 750,000 tons of waste per year, which costs about $32 million. It has reached its maximum allowed height and, as it expands outwards to incorporate another 102 acres of land, it is expected to reach capacity in 2038. The agency has explored several options to extend its life, such as cutting the amount of trash it processes, limiting disposal to residential waste, burning trash, and employing temporary measures while waiting for technological solutions. It cannot increase its height further without approval from both the town and the Federal Aviation Administration.

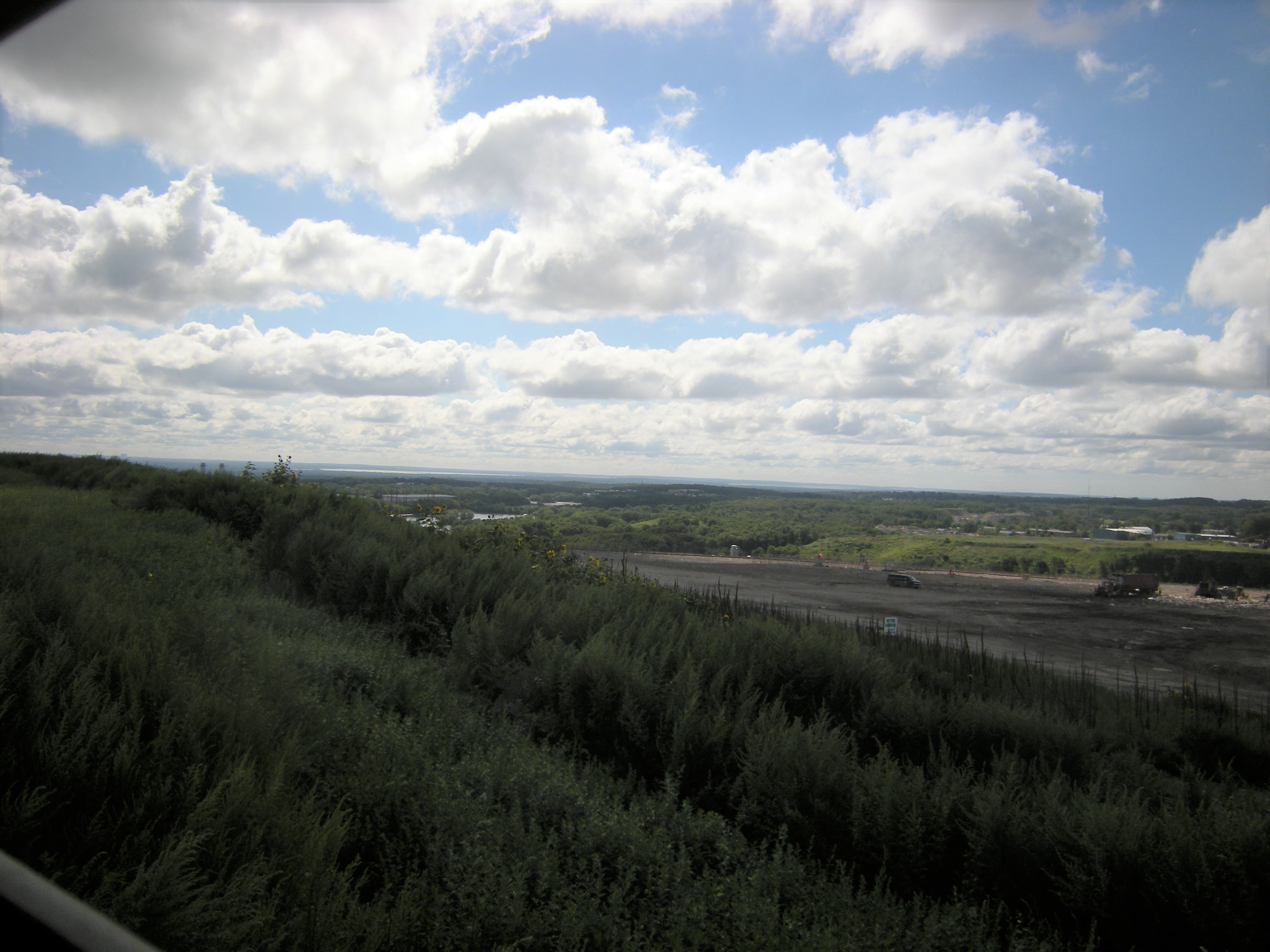
View from the top of Central Landfill, looking Southeast toward Narragansett Bay

The last waste composition study of the landfill was in 1990.

The landfill is one of the highest points in the state, with "beautiful, panoramic views of the Ocean State on an autumn afternoon." It is sometimes mistakenly listed as the highest point in Rhode Island, though Jerimoth Hill is more than 200 feet taller.

Gas produced at the landfill is collected and turned into electricity by Broadrock Renewables, LLC.

== History ==
Central Landfill is a double-lined landfill built on the site of a former quarry.

In 1980, in an attempt to limit out-of-state waste disposal at the Central Landfill, the Rhode Island Legislature passed a law to require that trucks bringing trash from other states have a contract with the Solid Waste Management Corporation, without requiring the company to grant such contracts. The landfill continued to accept some out-of-state waste, but in 1986 began to turn away trucks headed to the dump from Massachusetts, which had increased the amount it sent over the border to about 1,000 tons every day.

According to Michael O'Connell, former executive director of the RIRRC, when he started with the company in the mid-2000s, corruption was rampant: "It became apparent to me after about six months this place was just being poisoned from the inside out by corruption. Half the people that worked here were put here by politicians. They didn’t feel they had to work, and those who were workers felt like, why bother?" After a couple members of the board resigned, then-governor Donald Carcieri told other members not to continue going to board meetings, allowing O'Connell to report directly to the governor to restructure the company, removing about a third of the employees and implementing a merit-based business corporate philosophy.

The landfill has also encountered some financial trouble due to the success of conservation efforts. In addition to the cost of conservation programs, the RIRRC's cost per ton of waste processed has increased due to a decrease in the amount of trash produced by Rhode Island citizens. The fees it charges per ton did not change for about 25 years, since the early 1990s, but set to increase by 47% between 2016 and 2018.

== Environmental impact ==
Before 1980, the site was used to dispose of liquid industrial waste, contaminating soil and groundwater. The practice was stopped and the hazardous waste disposal area closed by order of the state in 1982. In 1986, the entire landfill was added to the Environmental Protection Agency (EPA) Superfund National Priorities List.

In 2012 the Massachusetts-based non-profit Toxics Action Center included Central Landfill in its "Dirty Dozen" list of the worst polluters in New England.

Landfill operations remove some recyclable materials from the waste, and there is a recycling drop-off for public use.
