= Roger Williams University =

Private university in Bristol, Rhode Island, US

- Former names: Roger Williams Junior College (1956–1967); Roger Williams College (1967–1992)
- Motto: Magna Est Veritas
- Type: Private university
- Established: 1956; 70 years ago
- Academic affiliations: Space-grant
- Endowment: $98.7 million (2025)
- President: Ioannis Miaoulis
- Faculty: 489 (fall 2022)
- Students: 4,397 (fall 2022)
- Undergraduates: 4,103 (fall 2022)
- Postgraduates: 294 (fall 2022)
- Location: Bristol, Rhode Island, US; 41°38′58″N 71°15′38″W
- Campus: Suburban, 140 acres
- Colors: Navy, Light Blue, White, and Gold accents
- Nickname: Hawks
- Sporting affiliations: NCAA Division III - CNE; NEISA
- Website: rwu.edu
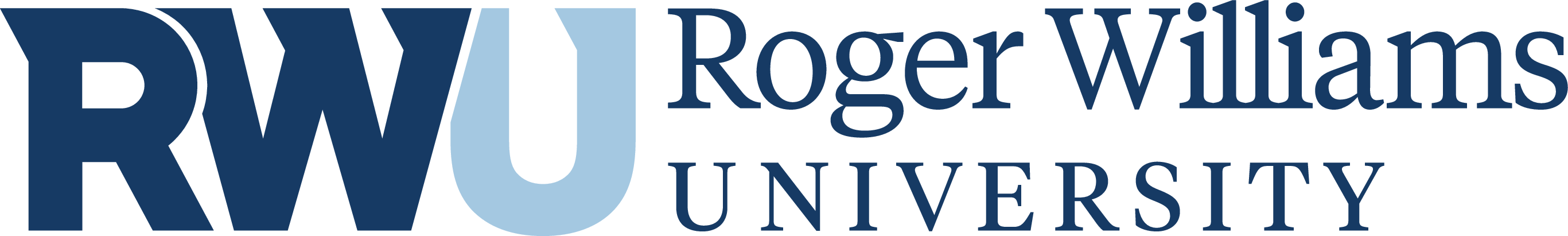

Roger Williams University (RWU) is a private university in Bristol, Rhode Island, United States. Founded in 1956, it was named for theologian and Rhode Island cofounder Roger Williams. The school enrolled approximately 4,400 undergraduate and graduate students and employs over 480 academic staff as of 2022.

== History ==
The university’s operations date to 1919, when Northeastern University in Boston opened a branch campus in the YMCA building in Providence, Rhode Island. In 1940, the YMCA board of directors began directing the school, and the YMCA Institute granted its first associate's degrees in 1948. In 1956, the institute received a state charter to become a two-year, degree-granting institution under the name of Roger Williams Junior College.

During the 1960s, the school began granting bachelor's degrees, and in 1967 subsequently adopted the name Roger Williams College. Needing a larger campus, the college purchased 80 acres (32 ha) of waterfront land and moved its main campus to Bristol in 1969. In 1989 new president Dr. Natale A. Sicuro initiated the Roger Williams Plan for the 1990s, and became concurrently the president of the newly established Roger Williams University School of Law and, in 1992, led the change to Roger Williams University. RWU celebrated its 50th anniversary in 2006.

Ioannis Miaoulis was appointed the eleventh president of Roger Williams University in 2019. Miaoulis previously served as both the president and director of the Boston Museum of Science since 2003.

In 2012, Roger Williams University initiated a tuition freeze in which all entering freshmen would have a guarantee that their tuition would not increase for the next four years. In 2019, the university terminated this policy.

On September 21, 2017, The Beach Boys were honored by Roger Williams University and music historians Al Gomes and Connie Watrous of Big Noise. Plaques were unveiled at the university's Baypoint Inn & Conference Center in Portsmouth, Rhode Island to commemorate the band's concert there on September 22, 1971. The 1971 concert was the first appearance of South African Ricky Fataar as an official member of the band and Filipino Billy Hinsche as a touring member, changing The Beach Boys' live and recording act's line-up into a multi-cultural group. Diversity is a credo of Roger Williams University, which is why the school chose to celebrate this moment in the band's history.

== Academics ==
Roger Williams University enrolls approximately 4,100 undergraduate and 300 graduate students in eight schools. These schools offer more than 50 liberal arts majors and professional degrees, such as law, architecture, construction management, historic preservation, and computer science. The university has a student to faculty ratio of 14:1 while almost half of the classes offered have less than 20 students.

The largest majors are business, management, and marketing (24%); architecture (10%); security, law enforcement, and related protective services (9%); communication and journalism (8%); psychology (7%) and construction management (6%).

Roger Williams University has several degree programs that are unusual in the United States:

- Marine Biology program: offers a B.S. in Marine Biology, which is one of about fifteen in the country.
- Architecture program: One of a few M. Arch. (Master’s of Architecture) in a traditional liberal arts environment.
- Historic Preservation program: the B.S. in Historic Preservation is one of seven offered in the country and the M.S. in Historic Preservation is one of about 35 offered in the country.
- Construction Management program: offers a B.S. in Construction Management (CM). RWU's Construction Management program is accredited by the American Council for Construction Education (ACCE) and a member of ASC's Northeast Region (Region 1).
- Law program: Only Juris Doctor available in Rhode Island; offers a Master of Studies in Law (MSL).

In February 2025, Roger Williams University (RWU) partnered with the Atlantic Shark Institute (ASI) to expand student research opportunities in marine science. The collaboration allows RWU students to earn academic credit through internships and fieldwork involving shark tagging, BRUVs analysis, and acoustic tracking. ASI’s shark datasets are also integrated into RWU courses such as Shark Biology and Conservation and Fisheries Science.

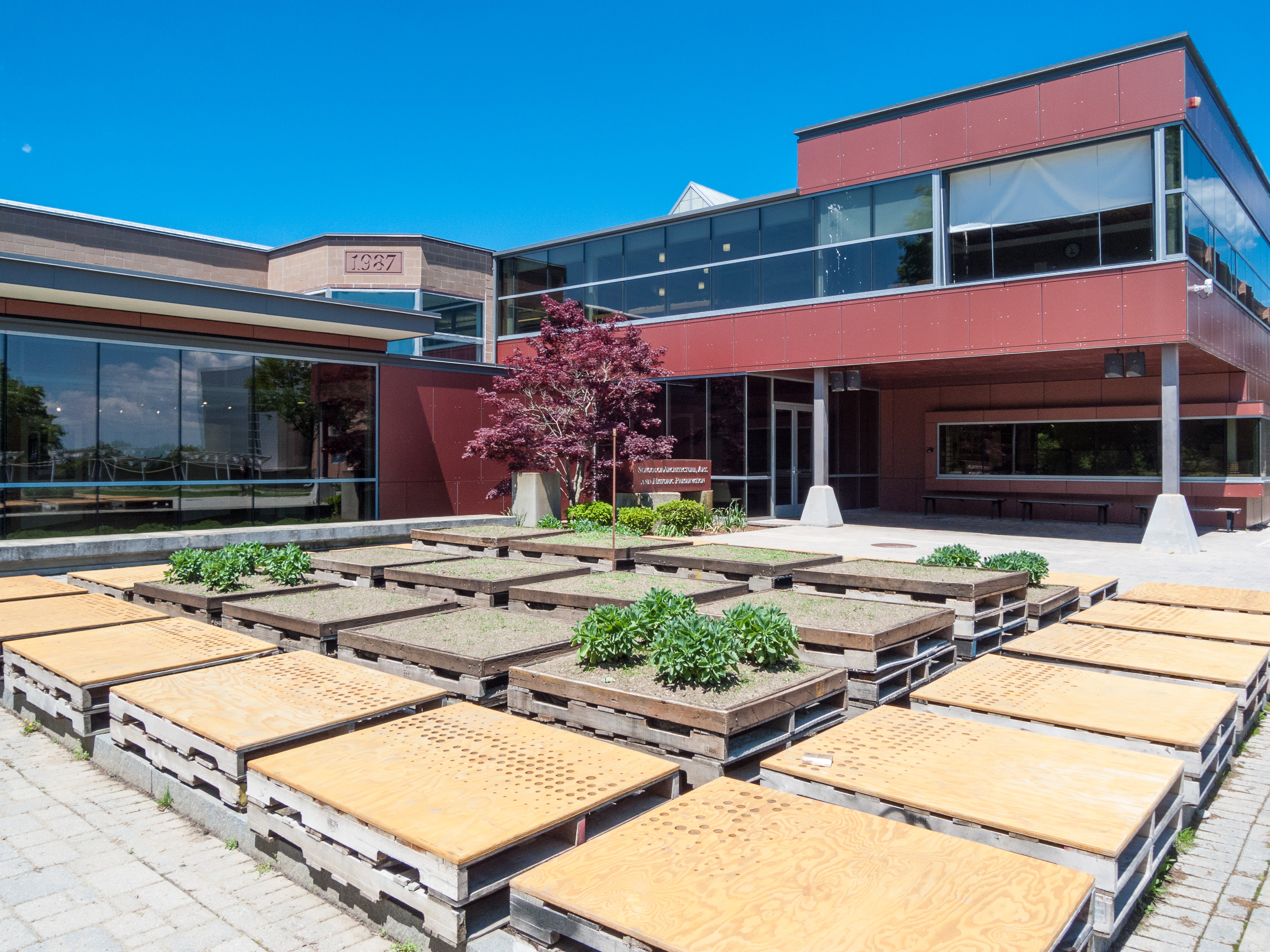
School of Art, Architecture, and Historic Preservation

== Student life ==
Approximately 63% of students live on campus. 88% of the students attend school full-time. About 14% have a family income of less than $40k. 77% of the student population is white, 11% is Hispanic, 3% is African American, 2% is Asian American, 3% are of two or more races, and 8% are of unknown race.

The university's campus newspaper, The Hawks' Herald, publishes approximately 20 issues per academic year. An FM radio station, WQRI 88.3, plays everything from college alternative to hip hop. The college's 20 varsity athletic teams play at the Division III level as members of the Conference of New England.

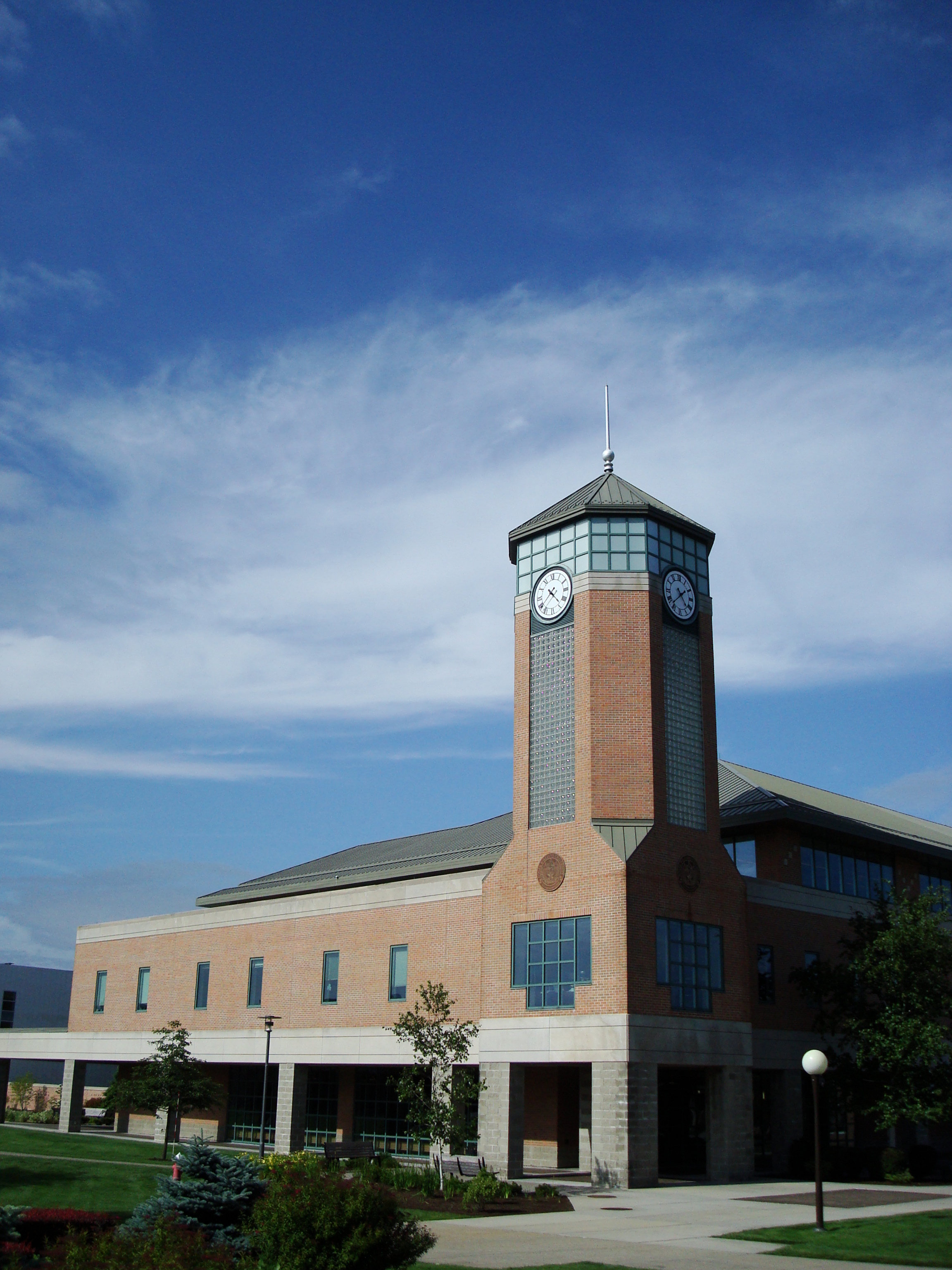
Clock tower of University Library

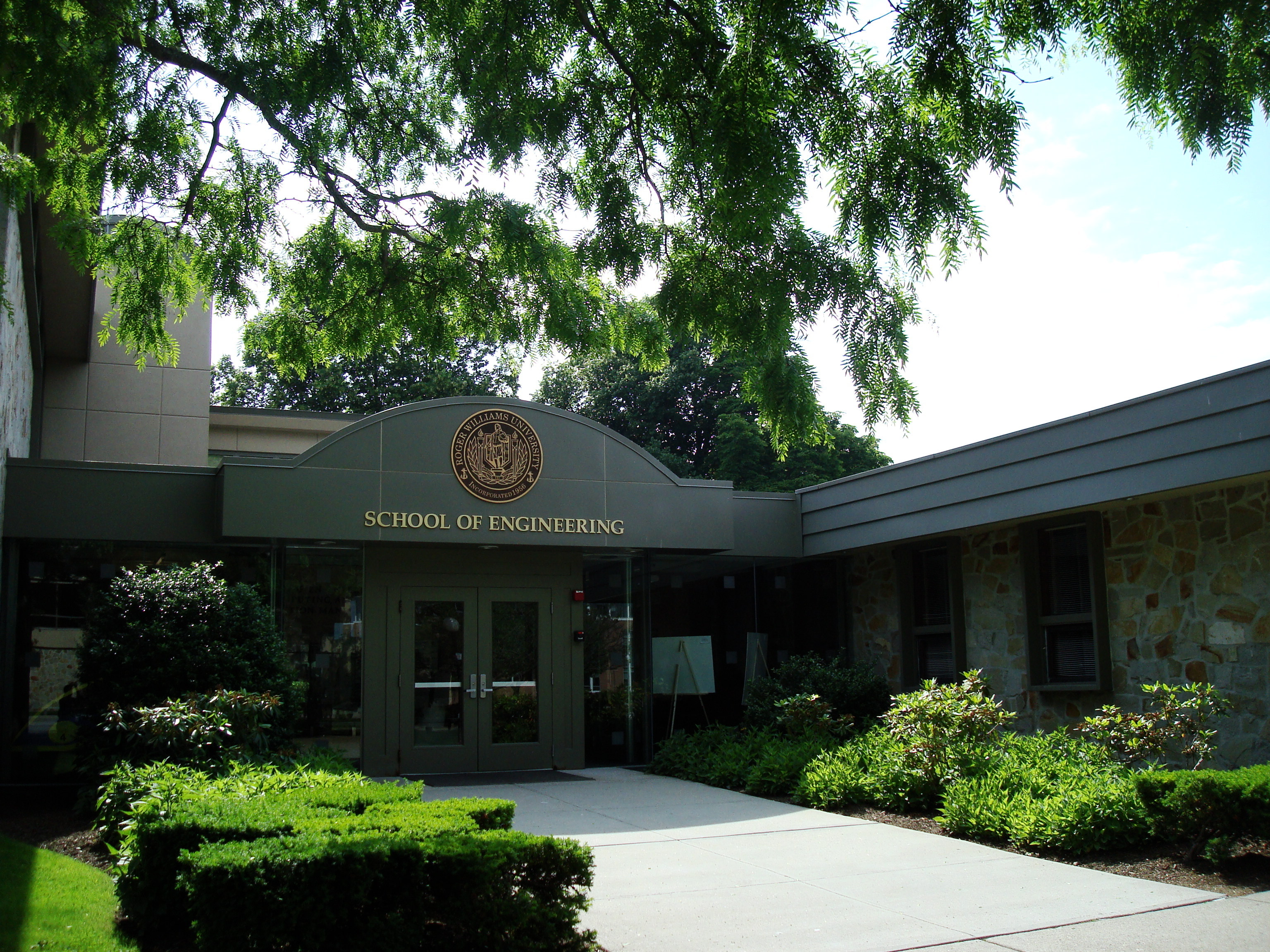
School of Engineering

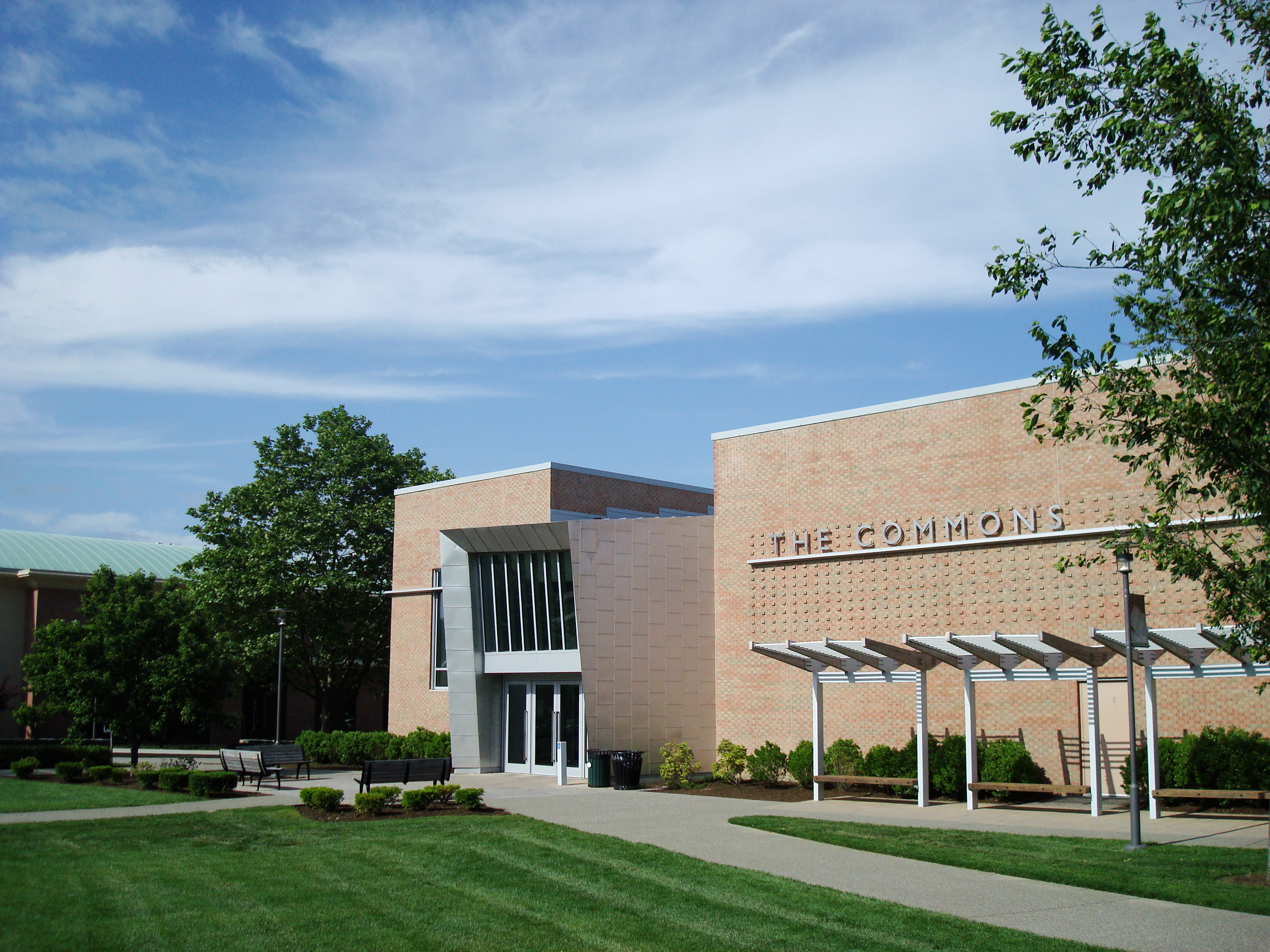
RWU Commons Dining Hall

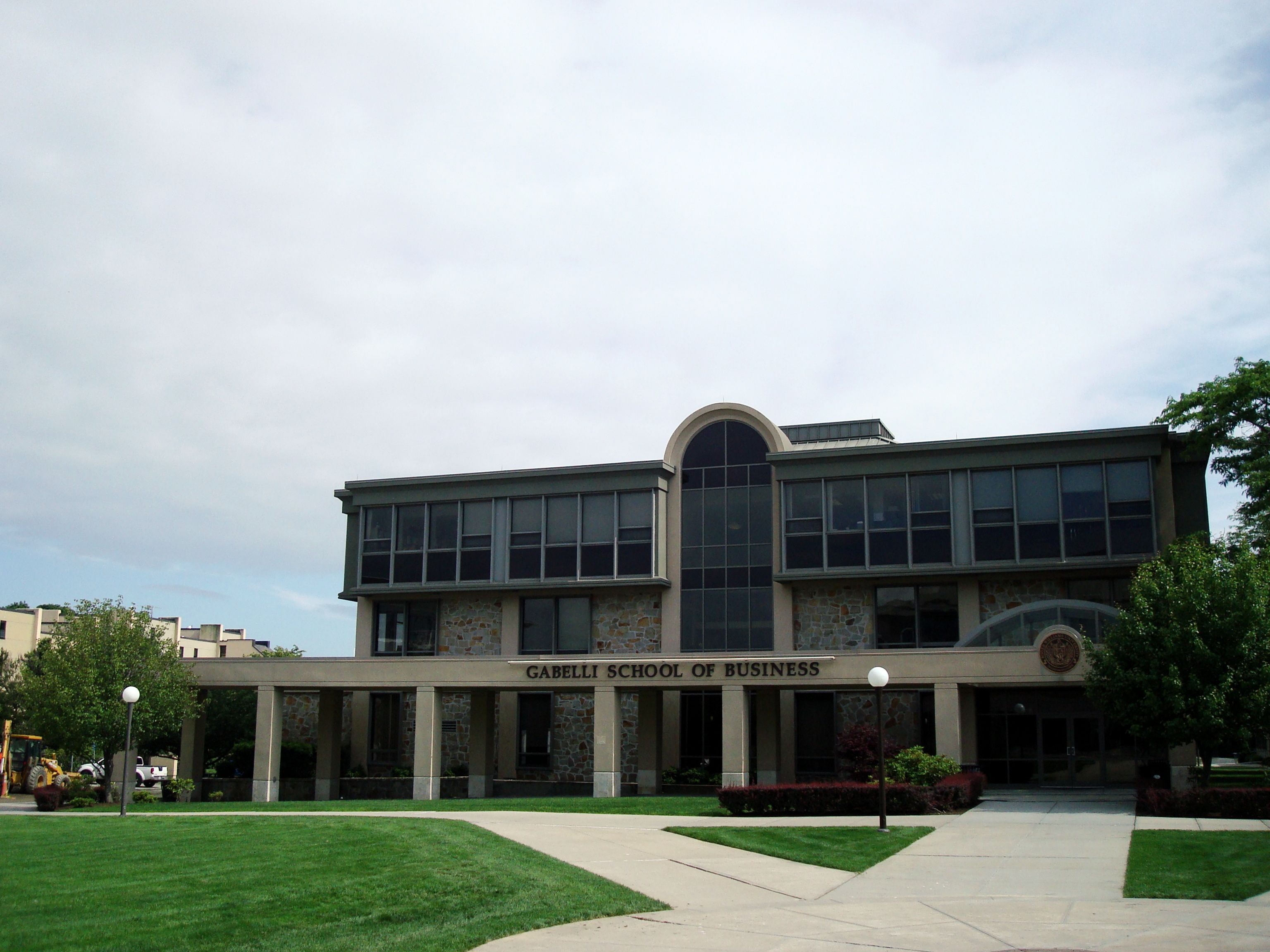
Gabelli School of Business

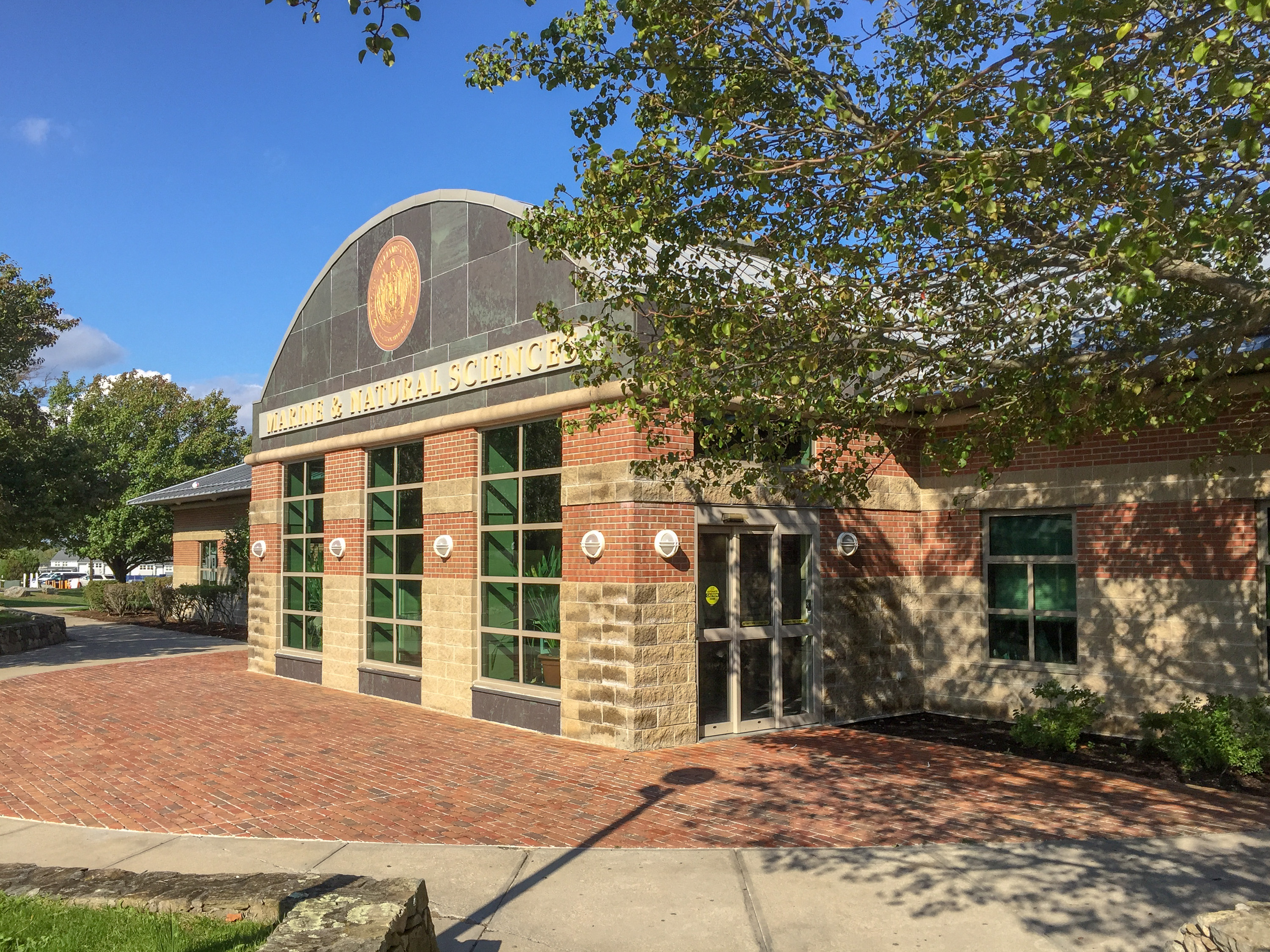
School of Marine and Natural Sciences

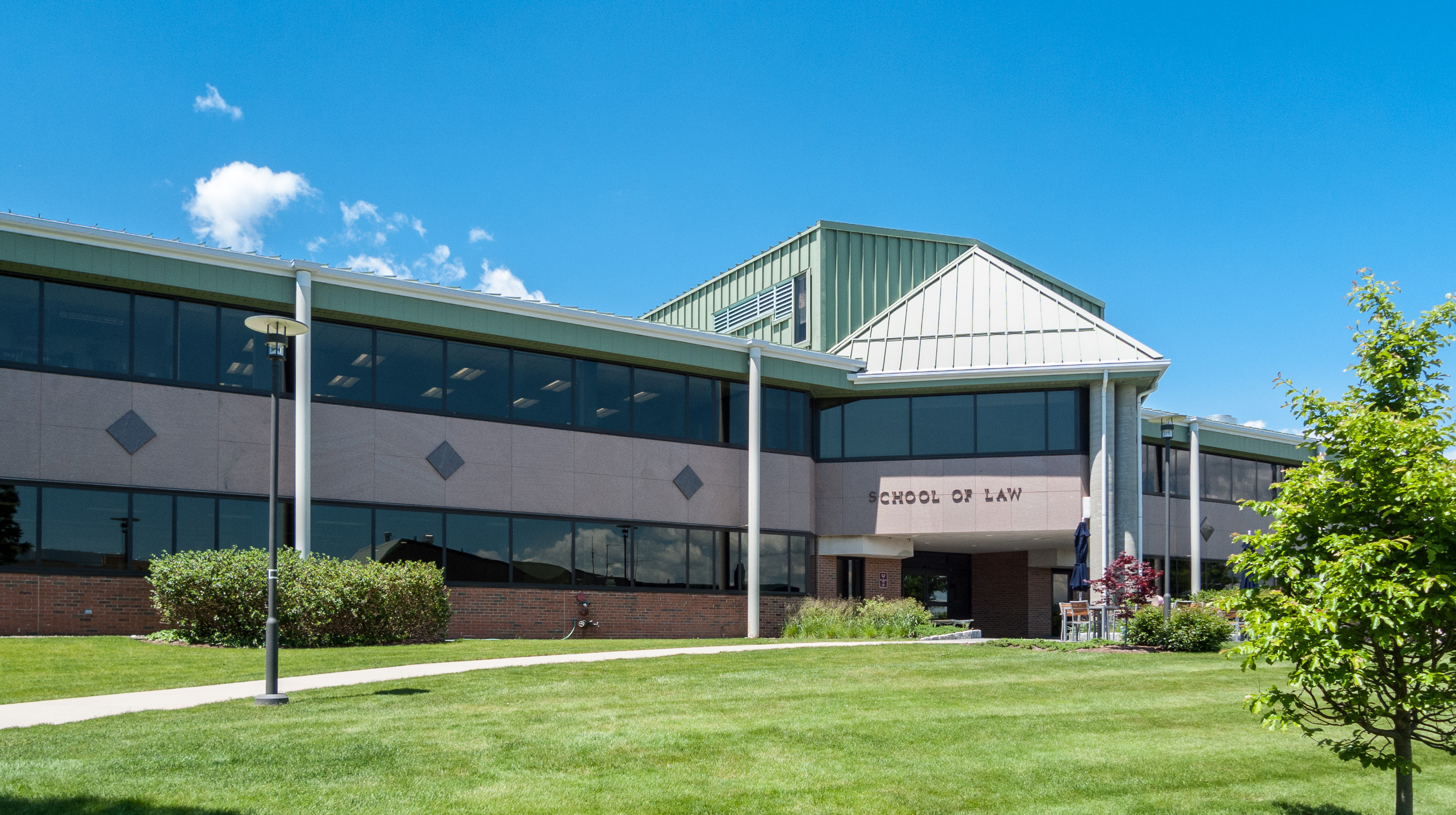
RWU School of Law

== Athletics ==
Roger Williams University teams participate as a member of the National Collegiate Athletic Association's Division III aside from the co-ed sailing team, which is Division I and is currently ranked number six in the sailing world's college rankings. Most of the Hawks are a member of the Conference of New England, except for the swimming and diving team, who compete in the New England Intercollegiate Swimming and Diving Association (NEISDA).

Men's sports include:

- Baseball
- Basketball
- Cross country
- Golf
- Lacrosse
- Polo
- Soccer
- Swimming & diving
- Tennis
- Track & field
- Wrestling

Women's sports include:

- Basketball
- Cross country
- Field hockey
- Lacrosse
- Polo
- Soccer
- Softball
- Swimming & diving
- Tennis
- Track & field
- Volleyball

Co-ed sports include:

- Equestrian
- Sailing

== Notable people ==
- Adam Braver, writer
- Roberto DaSilva, politician
- Jason Mattera, conservative blogger and writer.
- James W. Nuttall, United States Army major general
- Joe Polisena, politician
- Jerry Remy, Former Boston Red Sox broadcaster and MLB player
- Chris Sparling, screenwriter and director
- June Speakman, politician
- Bob Wylie, professional football coach
