= Thornton, Rhode Island =

Neighborhood in Rhode Island, United States

Coordinates: 41°47′39″N 71°28′42″W

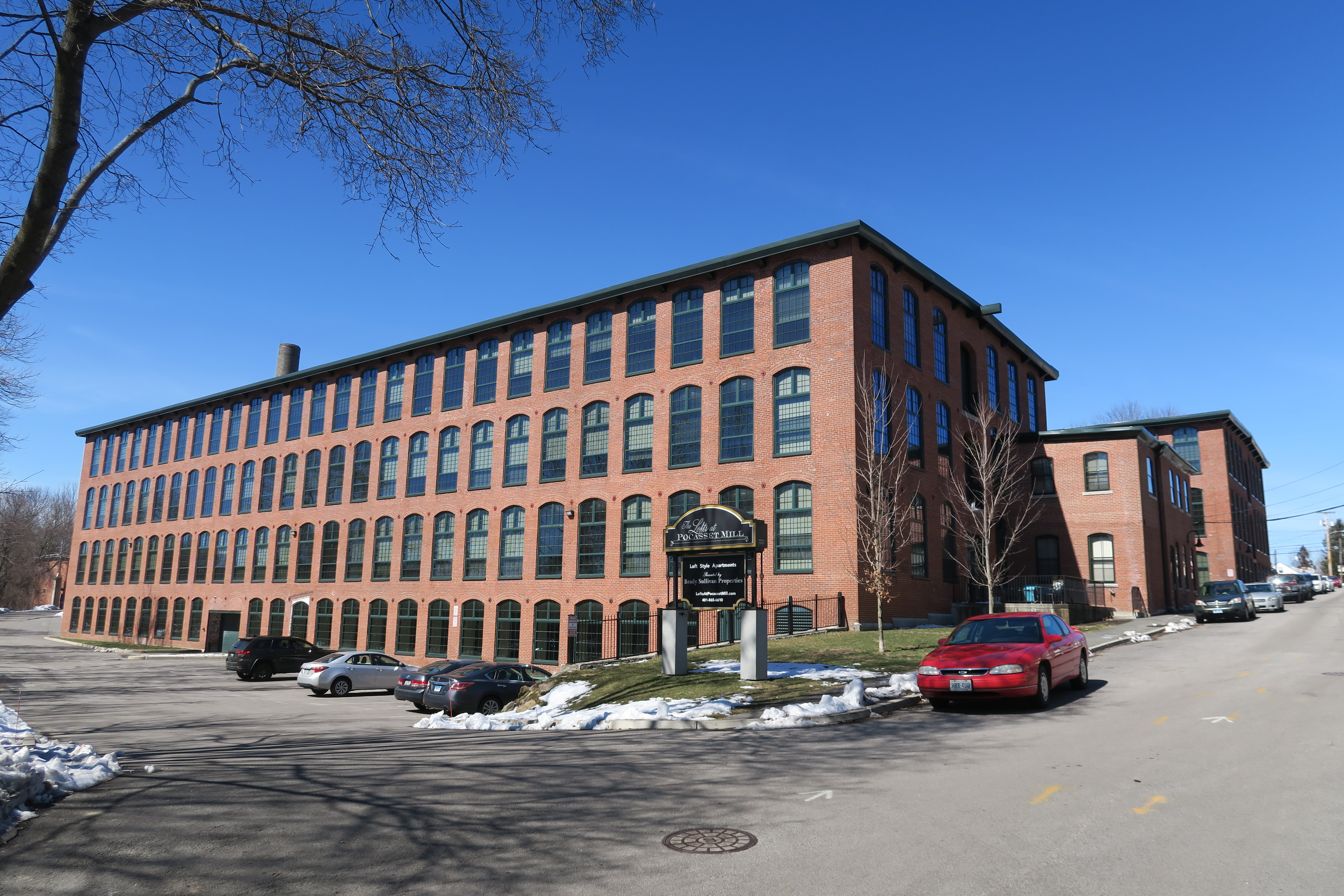
The Lofts at Pocasset Mill

Thornton (formerly known as Simmonsville and Lower Simmons Village) is a neighborhood located in the north-west part of Cranston, Rhode Island on the Johnston line and extends into the Johnston side.

Many of the residents of this Thornton are Italian-American, and the Feast of Saint Rocco, a Christian saint, is held every August on the grounds of St. Rocco's Church and remains an important cultural event in the community. Saint Rocco's Church was formerly on the Cranston side of Thornton on Clemence Street until the new church opened in 1951 on Atwood Avenue on the Johnston side of Thornton.
