= Johnston, Rhode Island =

- Town
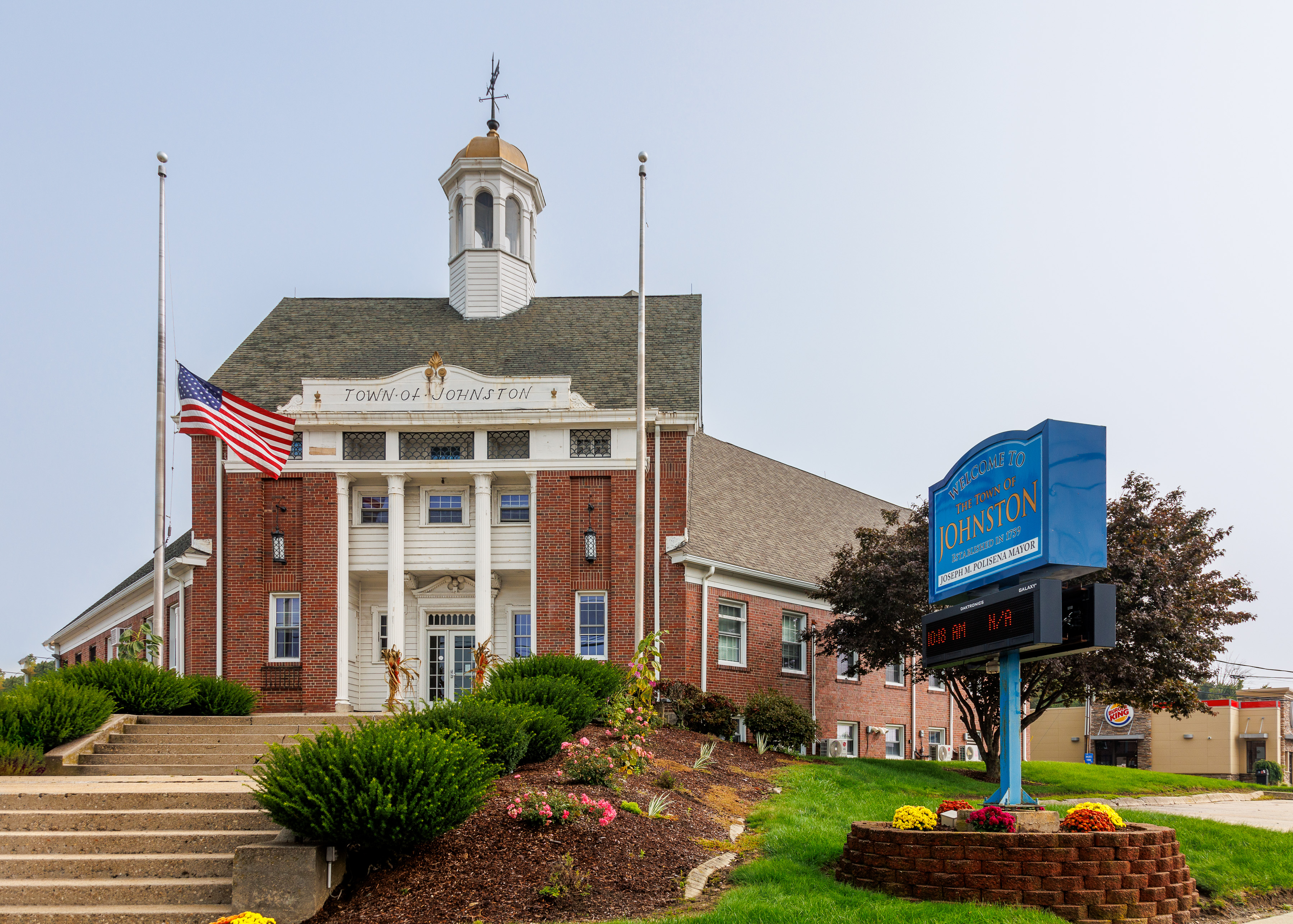
- Johnston Town Hall

- Seal Logo

- Location in Providence County and the state of Rhode Island.
- Coordinates: 41°49′36″N 71°29′41″W
- Country: United States
- State: Rhode Island
- County: Providence
- Established: 1759

Government
  - Type: Mayor-Council
  - Mayor: Joseph Polisena Jr.
  - Town Council: Linda Folcarelli (D); Lauren Garzone (D); Alfred T. Carnevale (D); Robert V. Russo (D); Robert J. Civetti (D)

Area
  - Total: 24.4 sq mi (63.1 km^{2})
  - Land: 23.7 sq mi (61.3 km^{2})
  - Water: 0.69 sq mi (1.8 km^{2})
- Elevation: 246 ft (75 m)

Population (2020)
  - Total: 29,568
  - Density: 1,249/sq mi (482.3/km^{2})
- Time zone: UTC−5 (Eastern (EST))
  - Summer (DST): UTC−4 (EDT)
- ZIP Code: 02919
- Area code: 401
- FIPS code: 44-37720
- GNIS feature ID: 1220073
- Website: Town website

Johnston is a town in Providence County, Rhode Island, United States. The population was 29,568 at the 2020 census. Johnston is the site of the Clemence Irons House (1691), a stone-ender museum, and the only landfill in Rhode Island. Incorporated on March 6, 1759, Johnston was named for the colonial attorney general, Augustus Johnston.

== Geography ==
According to the United States Census Bureau, the town has a total area of 24.4 square miles (63 km^{2}), of which 23.7 square miles (61 km^{2}) is land and 0.7 square miles (1.8 km^{2}) (2.91%) is water.

=== Neighborhoods ===
Neighborhoods in Johnston: Winsor Hill, Thornton (includes part of Cranston), Graniteville, Hughesdale, Morgan Mills, Manton, Simmonsville, Pocasset, West End, Belknap, Moswansicut Lake, Merino and Frog City.

== History ==
The area was first settled by English settlers in the seventeenth century as a farming community. In 1759 the town officially separated from Providence and was incorporated on March 6, 1759. Johnston was named for the current colonial attorney general, Augustus Johnston, who was later burned in effigy during the Stamp Act protests in 1765 and then fled Rhode Island as a Tory during the American Revolution in 1779. The first house of worship in Johnston opened when the Baptist Meeting House in Belknap was constructed in 1771. During the American Revolution Rhode Island's only gunpowder mill was constructed in Graniteville, and the town hosted American General John Sullivan for a dinner in 1779 upon his departure from Rhode Island to fight in New York. In 1790 the Belknap School, the first public school in the town, was founded. In 1791 the Providence and Norwich Turnpike (today's Plainfield Pike) was chartered.

== Demographics ==
Historical population
Census	Pop.	Note	%±
1790	1,320		—
1800	1,864		41.2%
1810	1,516		−18.7%
1820	1,542		1.7%
1830	2,115		37.2%
1840	2,477		17.1%
1850	2,937		18.6%
1860	3,440		17.1%
1870	4,192		21.9%
1880	5,765		37.5%
1890	9,778		69.6%
1900	4,305		−56.0%
1910	5,935		37.9%
1920	6,855		15.5%
1930	9,357		36.5%
1940	10,672		14.1%
1950	12,725		19.2%
1960	17,160		34.9%
1970	22,037		28.4%
1980	24,907		13.0%
1990	26,542		6.6%
2000	28,195		6.2%
2010	28,769		2.0%
2020	29,568		2.8%
U.S. Decennial Census

At the 2020 census, there were 29,568 people and 11,359 households in the town. The population density was 1,259.4 inhabitants per square mile (486.3/km^{2}). There were 12,501 housing units in the town. The racial makeup of the town was 79.45% White, 3.46% African American, 0.34% Native American, 3.05% Asian, 0.06% Pacific Islander, 6.52% from other races, and 7.12% from two or more races. Hispanic or Latino of any race were 13% of the population.

There were 11,359 households, of which 28.6% had children under the age of 18 living with them, 44.7% were married couples living together, 30.5% had a female householder with no spouse present, and 16.7% had a male householder with no spouse present. 11.7% of all households were made up of individuals, and 5.1% had someone living alone who was 65 years of age or older. The average household size was 2.54 and the average family size was 3.09.

Age distribution was 19.3% under the age of 18, 6.6% from 18 to 24, 26.4% from 25 to 44, 26.4% from 45 to 64, and 21.2% who were 65 years of age or older. The median age was 43 years.

The median household income was $87,514, and the median family income was $104,950. The per capita income for the town was $45,447. About 8.6% of the population were below the poverty line, including 9.9% of those under age 18 and 8.2% of those age 65 or over.

In 2000, 46.7% of Johnston residents identified themselves as being of Italian heritage. This was the highest percentage of Italian Americans of any municipality in the country.

== Parks and recreation ==
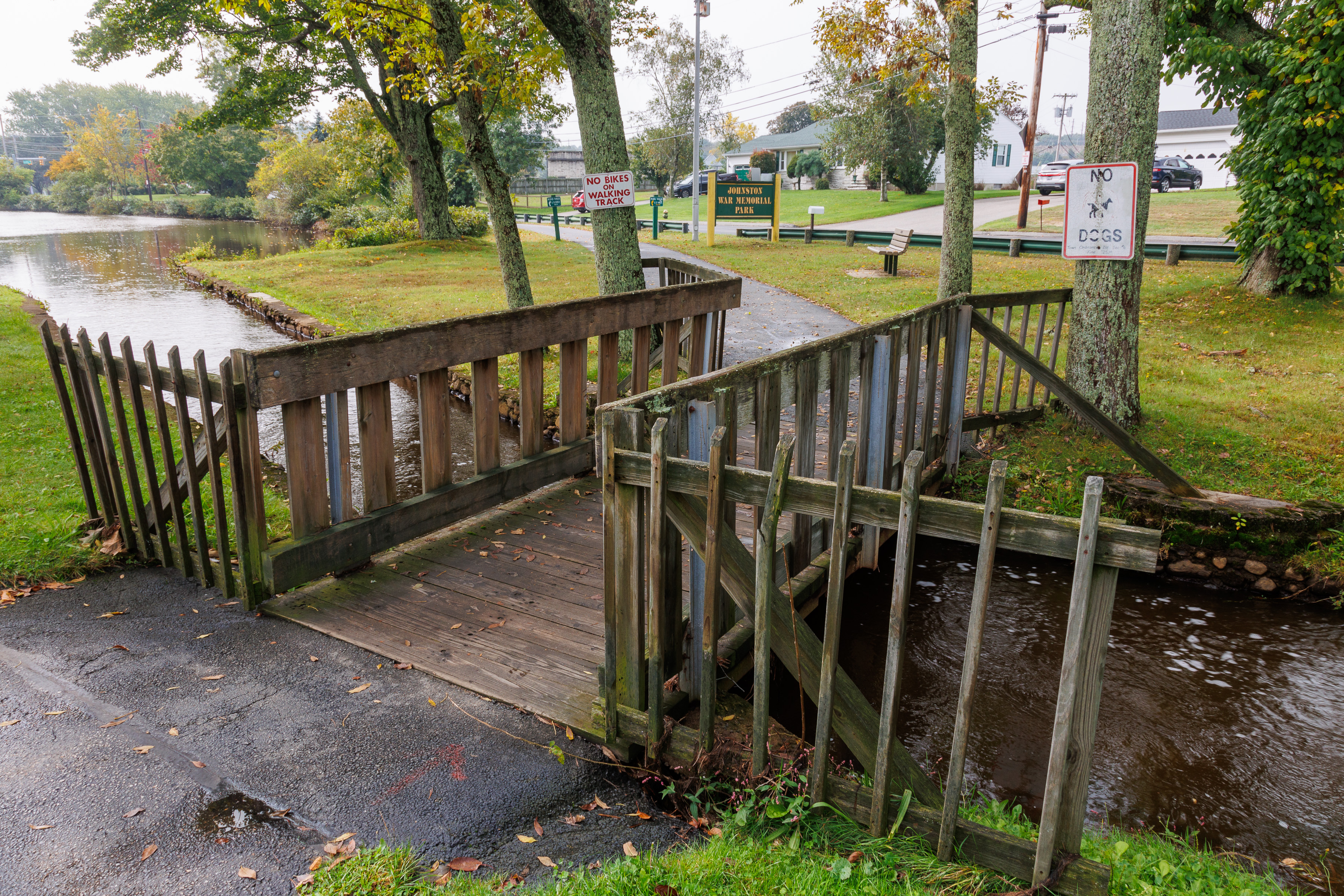
Johnston War Memorial Park

Local parks include the Johnston War Memorial Park and Snake Den State Park. Former Providence Mayor Joe Paolino purchased the Columbus statue that had been removed from Columbus Square in Providence. In 2023, the statue was donated to the city and placed in Memorial Park with the unveiling held on Columbus Day.

== Government ==
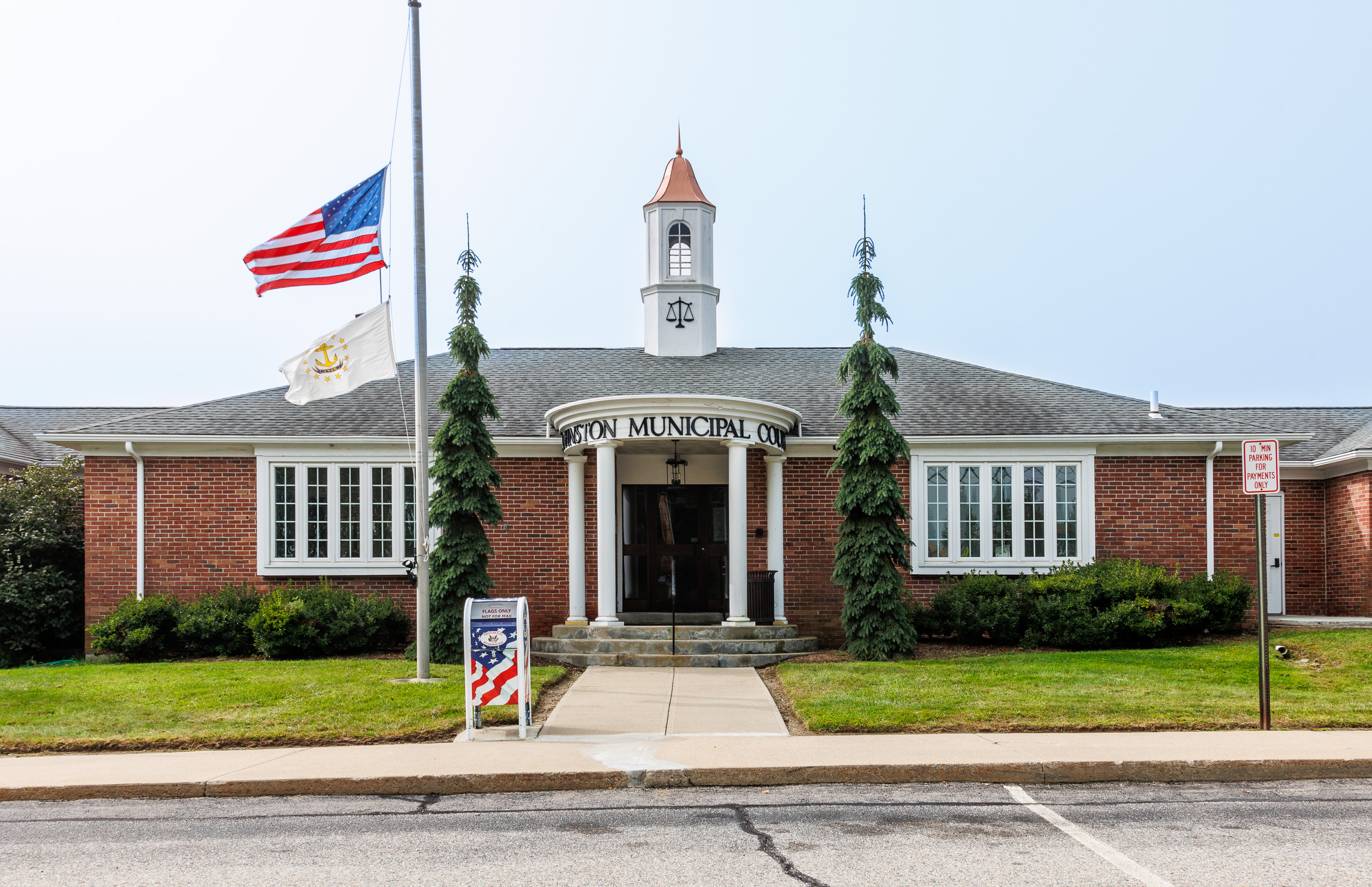
Johnston Municipal Court

The town is governed by a mayor (currently Joe Polisena Jr.) and a five-member town council.

=== Police ===
The Johnston Police Department is the primary law enforcement agency in Johnston. The town has a population of about 29,000. The department is headed by Chief Mark Vieira. It is headquartered at 1651 Atwood Avenue.

In 1874, Samuel A. Irons was appointed as the first commissioner of police. Hiram Kimball served as police chief from 1898 to 1934. His only policeman was his son. By the 1930s, the department had grown to a total of six, including the police chief Chester Colwell.

In 2021, the headquarters of the police department was renamed to the Richard S. Tamburini Public Safety Complex after an officer that served for 25 years. Richard Tamburini had been found earlier that year to have violated the First Amendment rights of a detective in the police department.

In 2025 the department developed a canine department for the first time since 2012.

The department has taken advantage of various federal programs that provide equipment to local police. In the 2010-11 fiscal year it received $4.1 million in assistance including 30 assault rifles, 44 bayonets, 12 Humvees and other items.

== Education ==
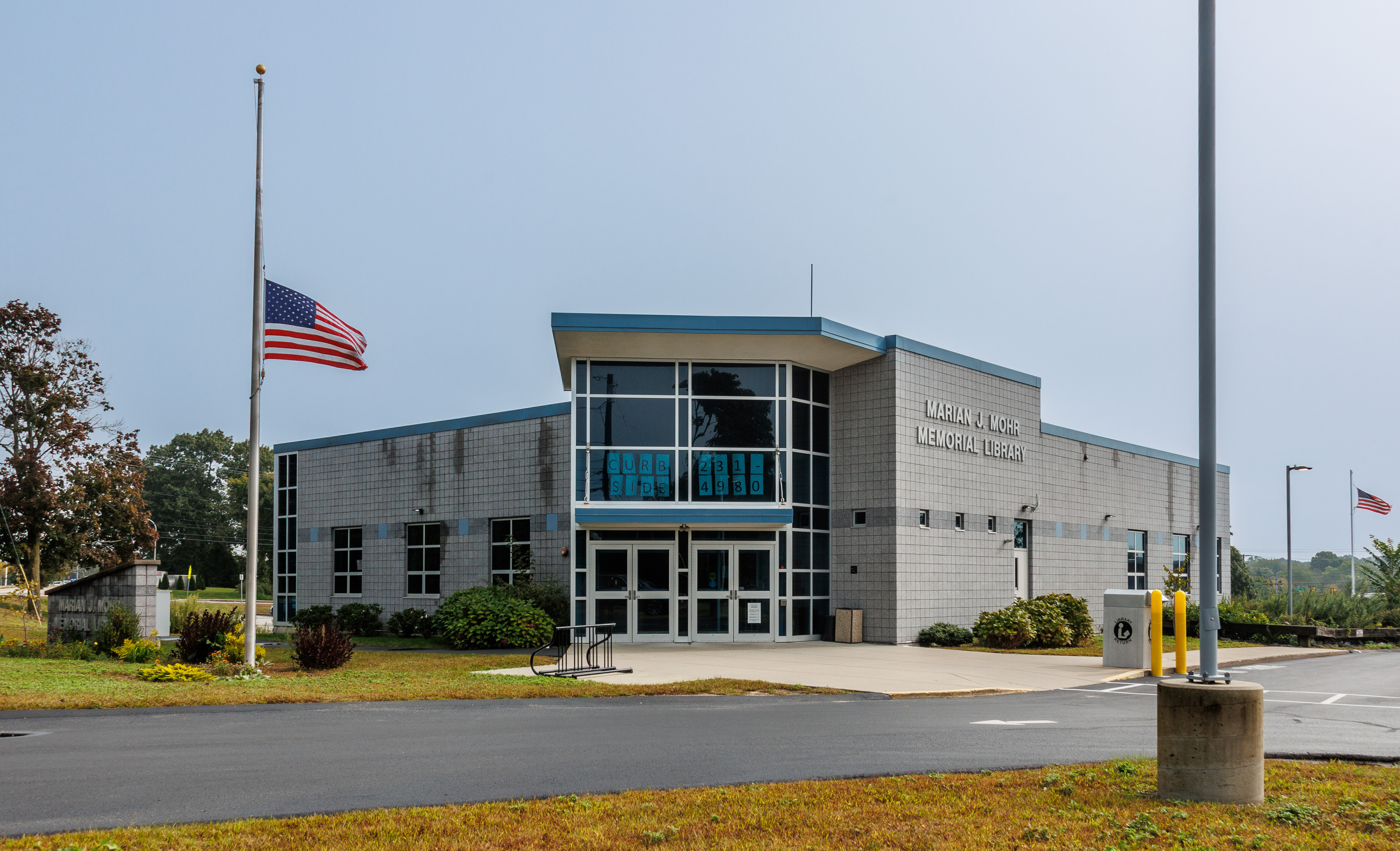
Mohr Memorial Library

The Johnston Public School System has four elementary schools, one middle school, and one high school. Johnston Senior High School is a 2005 Rhode Island Department of Education Regents' Commended School.

In 2008, the Johnston School Committee decided to close both Graniteville and Calef Elementary schools. Students affected by the closures were transferred to Brown Avenue Elementary School and Winsor Hill Elementary School. This decision was not without controversy, as school officials, parents and teachers complained of inadequate staffing, increased neighborhood traffic and lack of attention for special-needs students.

== Media ==
Johnston has one local weekly newspaper, the Johnston Sun Rise. The paper is complimentary, and can be found in many Johnston businesses.

== Economy ==
Insurance company FM Global is based in Johnston.

In 2018, Providence-based Citizens Bank opened a $285 million corporate campus in the town. The project encompasses 425,000 square feet and employs around 3,000 people.

== Notable people ==
- Noel Acciari, hockey player, currently with the Pittsburgh Penguins
- Zenas Work Bliss, Lieutenant Governor of Rhode Island from 1910 to 1913
- Jeanine Calkin, Rhode Island state senator
- Amanda Clayton, actress, graduate of Johnston Senior High School
- Paul DelVecchio (a.k.a. Pauly D); DJ, reality TV personality (Jersey Shore); graduate of Johnston Senior High School
- Deborah Fellela, member of the Rhode Island House of Representatives
- Mat Franco, magician
- Samuel Ward King, 15th governor of Rhode Island; enacted laws that led to the Dorr Rebellion
- Lou Lamoriello, former general manager of the New Jersey Devils and the Toronto Maple Leafs. Now with the New York Islanders of the NHL
- Aria Mia Loberti, actress
- Frank Lombardo, Rhode Island state senator
- Christopher Lowrey, countertenor
- Dan Mazzulla, basketball player and coach
- Joe Mazzulla, head coach for the Boston Celtics
- Justin Mazzulla, basketball player and coach
- Mario Mendez, member of the Rhode Island House of Representatives
- Joe Polisena, Rhode Island state senator; former mayor of Johnston
- Joey Spina, professional boxer
- Nathan B. Sprague, 19th-century politician
- Stephen Ucci, member of the Rhode Island House of Representatives

== Sister cities ==
- Panni, Apulia, Italy
