= 2026 Oklahoma State Cowboys football team =

American college football season

2026 Oklahoma State Cowboys football
- Conference: Big 12 Conference
- Record: 7–4 (5–3 Big 12)
- Head coach: Eric Morris (1st season)
- Offensive coordinator: Sean Brophy (1st season)
- Offensive scheme: Air raid
- Defensive coordinator: Skyler Cassity (1st season)
- Base defense: 3–4
- Home stadium: Boone Pickens Stadium

2026 Big 12 Conference football standings
	Conf.			Overall
Team	W		L	W		L
No. 2 Utah y	8	–	0	11	–	0
No. 12 Texas Tech	7	–	1	10	–	1
No. 10 BYU	6	–	2	9	–	2
No. 19 Arizona	5	–	3	8	–	3
No. 20 Houston	5	–	3	8	–	3
Oklahoma State	5	–	3	7	–	4
Baylor	4	–	4	6	–	5
Arizona State	4	–	4	6	–	5
UCF	4	–	4	6	–	5
Iowa State	3	–	5	5	–	6
TCU	3	–	5	5	–	6
Cincinnati	3	–	5	6	–	5
Kansas	2	–	6	4	–	7
West Virginia	2	–	6	5	–	6
Colorado	2	–	6	4	–	7
Kansas State	1	–	7	4	–	7
Championship: TBD vs. Utah
^ – College Football Playoff participant; $ – Conference champion; y – Championship game participant; As of November 22, 2026; Rankings from CFP rankings

The 2026 Oklahoma State Cowboys football team represents Oklahoma State University as a member of the Big 12 Conference during the 2026 NCAA Division I FBS football season. They are led by Eric Morris in his first year as their head coach. The Cowboys play their home games at Boone Pickens Stadium located in Stillwater, Oklahoma.

== Offseason ==
=== Outgoing transfers ===
Player	Position	Height	Weight	Year	New team
Michael Riles	EDGE	6'2.5	235	Freshman	Prairie View A&M
Darius Thomas	LB	6'2	212	Redshirt junior	
Noah McKinney	IOL	6'3	245	Redshirt junior	TCU
Tanyon Freibaum	LS	6'1	195	Junior	Texas A&M
Temerrick Johnson	LB	6'4	235	Redshirt freshman	Hutchinson CC
Carrington Pierce	CB	6'2	190	Sophomore	USC
Josh Ford	TE	6'6	265	Sophomore	Alabama
Lavaka Taukeiaho	IOL	6'4	315	Redshirt sophomore	San Jose State
Jaden Perez	WR	6'1	165	Freshman	North Alabama
Camron Heard	WR	6'0	155	Redshirt sophomore	
Kalib Hicks	RB	5'10	195	Redshirt sophomore	Western Kentucky
Sam Jackson V	WR	5'11	170	Redshirt senior	
Eric Fletcher	CB	6'2	178	Redshirt freshman	Wisconsin
Austin Kawecki	IOL	6'4.5	260	Redshirt junior	Wisconsin
Shamar Rigby	WR	6'5	170	Sophomore	Wisconsin
Jacobi Oliphant	CB	6'4	225	Redshirt freshman	Kansas State
Hauss Hejny	QB	5'11	185	Sophomore	Colorado State
Rodney Fields Jr.	RB	5'9	189	Sophomore	Kansas State
Armstrong Nnodim	DL	6'2	310	Redshirt senior	Penn State
Markell Samuel	OT	6'4	265	Redshirt senior	Georgia Tech
Noah Walters	QB	6'0	190	Redshirt junior	
Ryker Haff	IOL	6'5.5	310	Freshman	Hutchinson CC
De'Marion Thomas	DL	6'4	325	Junior	Houston
David Kabongo	S	5'11	170	Sophomore	Utah State
Gage Stanaland	IOL	6'5	290	Redshirt sophomore	Georgia State
Kyran Duhon	EDGE	6'1	235	Sophomore	Tulsa
JK Johnson	CB	6'1	175	Redshirt senior	Florida Atlantic
Grant Seagren	OT	6'6	305	Redshirt sophomore	Northwestern
Matthew Wade	OT	6'5	290	Freshman	Utah State
Banks Bowen	QB	6'3	190	Freshman	North Alabama
Poasa Utu	LB	6'0	235	Redshirt sophomore	Nevada
Nuku Mafi	OT	6'5	285	Sophomore	Purdue
Chase Barry	P	6'3	205	Redshirt junior	UCLA
Jaxson Duffield	LS	6'0	206	Freshman	Kansas State
Cam Abshire	WR	6'4	185	Redshirt junior	UConn
Zane Flores	QB	6'3.5	187	Redshirt freshman	Iowa State
Dylan Smith	S	6'0	170	Junior	Memphis
Kasen Carpenter	IOL	6'3	265	Junior	Kansas
Taje McCoy	LB	6'3	245	Redshirt sophomore	Georgia Tech
Jarrett Henry	IOL	6'6	305	Redshirt junior	UTSA
Jo Pierce	S	6'2	185	Freshman	UAB
Royal Capell	WR	5'10	185	Freshman	UTEP
Jordan Vyborny	TE	6'5	230	Freshman	Iowa State
Wendell Gregory	EDGE	6'3	220	Sophomore	Kansas State
Landyn Cleveland	S	5'11	185	Sophomore	UNLV
Ike Esonwune	LB	6'2	200	Redshirt sophomore	UAB
DJ Dugar	RB	6'0.5	205	Freshman	Tulane
Grayson Brousseau	TE	6'6	220	Sophomore	UCF
Tre Griffiths	WR	6'3	205	Redshirt freshman	Hawaii
Carson Suesue	TE	6'6	220	Sophomore	New Mexico State
Tyler Brumfield	OT	6'6	315	Junior	Eastern Michigan
Gavin Freeman	WR	5'10	170	Senior	Baylor
Mason Schubert	QB	6'3	190	Freshman	Arkansas State
Talyn Shettron	WR	6'3	195	Redshirt junior	Louisiana Tech
Jaylen Lloyd	WR	5'11	180	Junior	Florida
Gabe Panikowski	K	5'10	200	Senior	Florida State
Draden Fullbright	CB	5'10	160	Freshman	UAB
Chandavian Bradley	EDGE	6'4.5	221	Junior	Coastal Carolina
Jaden Allen-Hendrix	RB	6'2	225	Sophomore	Coastal Carolina
DeAndre Boykins	S	5'11	210	Senior	FIU
Shea Freibaum	LS	6'1	205	Junior	Texas A&M
Michael Diatta	DL	6'5	265	Senior	Vanderbilt
Will Monney	TE	6'4	205	Junior	Utah
Da'Wain Lofton	WR	5'10	175	Senior	Delaware
Ayo Shotomide-King	WR	6'3	225	Senior	San Diego State
Sesi Vailahi	RB	5'11	190	Redshirt sophomore	Utah State
Jaylin Davies	CB	6'1	165	Redshirt senior	Vanderbilt
Davis Dotson	IOL	6'5	290	Redshirt junior	Tulsa
Bryan McCoy	LB	6'0	225	Senior	
Austin Young	DT	6'4	305	Redshirt freshman	Central Arkansas

=== Additions ===
==== Incoming transfers ====
Player	Position	Height	Weight	Year	Former team
Lachie Pozzobon	P	6'4	190	Freshman	Stephen F. Austin
Caden Yates	LS	6'1	213	Junior	North Texas
Nolan Akins	LS	6'1	200	Freshman	SMU
Drew Mestemaker	QB	6'4	210	Sophomore	North Texas
Caleb Hawkins	RB	6'2	200	Freshman	North Texas
Quinton Hammonds	S	6'1	219	Sophomore	North Texas
Braydon Nelson	OT	6'4	320	Sophomore	North Texas
Wyatt Young	WR	6'1	185	Sophomore	North Texas
Miles Coleman	WR	5'6	150	Sophomore	North Texas
Johnny Dickson	IOL	6'3	280	Redshirt junior	North Texas
Desmond Magiya	OT	6'4	270	Junior	North Texas
Terrence Lewis	WR	6'0	160	Freshman	North Texas
Kanijal Thomas	CB	5'11	168	Junior	Kansas State
Kollin Lewis	CB	5'11	170	Junior	North Texas
Fatafehi Vailea	DL	6'2	290	Redshirt senior	North Texas
Ayo Adeyi	RB	5'7	197	Senior	James Madison
Keviyan Huddleston	DL	6'4	235	Redshirt sophomore	North Texas
Evan Jackson	S	6'0	170	Junior	North Texas
Billy Walton	EDGE	6'2.5	215	Redshirt sophomore	SMU
Jerry Lawson	DL	6'2	295	Junior	Louisville
Ethan Wesloski	LB	6'1	225	Redshirt junior	North Texas
Tyler Mercer	IOL	6'4	275	Sophomore	Kansas
Mo Horn	CB	5'11	175	Redshirt junior	Texas Tech
Israel Polk	WR	6'1	152	Redshirt sophomore	Akron
Jacob Sexton	IOL	6'6	294	Senior	Oklahoma
Sam Keltner	K	5'10	180	Redshirt freshman	SMU
Justin Bowick	WR	6'5	195	Senior	Illinois
Tate Romney	LB	6'2	200	Redshirt junior	Arizona State
Donovan Green	TE	6'4	225	Redshirt junior	LSU
Joseph Hanson	OT	6'5	300	Junior	Coastal Carolina
Braylon Rigsby	DL	6'3	285	Redshirt sophomore	Texas Tech
Bodie Boydstun	TE	6'5	240	Redshirt sophomore	Southwestern Oklahoma State
James Williams	EDGE	6'6	245	Redshirt junior	Florida State
Saadiq Clements	DL	6'4	290	Redshirt sophomore	North Texas
DJ Jackson Jr.	EDGE	6'4	260	Junior	Troy
Grant Jordan	QB	6'2	210	Senior	UMass
Vincent Holmes	S	6'0	185	Junior	Washington
Ashton Lepo	OT	6'7	270	Redshirt junior	Michigan State
Tre Page	RB	5'9	180	Redshirt freshman	Tarleton State
Isaiah Chisom	LB	6'1	220	Redshirt sophomore	UCLA
Chris Barnes	WR	5'8	155	Redshirt freshman	Wake Forest
William Mason	RB	6'2	225	Junior	Central Oklahoma
Shaun Torgeson	OT	6'5	285	Sophomore	Portland State
Christian Bodner	S	5'11	170	Redshirt sophomore	Liberty
Jack Puckett	LB	6'1	240	Redshirt junior	Central Oklahoma
Dallas Winner-Johnson	LB	6'4	225	Junior	Tulane
Kai Holec	OT	6'8	295	Redshirt freshman	Indiana State
Trudell Berry	CB	6'1	185	Senior	Vanderbilt
Dennis Moody	RB	5'11	180	Junior	North Texas
Rodney Harris II	WR	6'3	195	Redshirt junior	Ohio
Morgan McPhaul	TE	6'2	265	Senior	VMI
Mose Phillips III	S	6'2	185	Junior	Missouri
Dominic Macon	DL	6'4	300	Freshman	Washington
Enai White	EDGE	6'5	280	Redshirt junior	Penn State
Jeremiah Piper	CB	5'10	175	Senior	Youngstown State
Markeith Williams	S	6'1	175	Redshirt junior	Miami (FL)
Cooper Mailand	LB	6'2	225	Sophomore	Wyoming
Carson Kolb	TE	6'3	235	Redshirt freshman	Oregon State
Harrison Dempsey	S	5'11	210	Redshirt junior	North Texas
Joseph Kim	K	5'10	200	Redshirt sophomore	Central Oklahoma
Xavier Mason	DT	6'0	260	Redshirt junior	Northwestern Oklahoma State
Luke Logan	TE	6'5	230	Redshirt freshman	Memphis
Nate Ost	P	6'3	200	Graduate Student	Robert Morris
Blake Hogshooter	WR	6'4	190	Freshman	Houston

== Schedule ==
Date	Time	Opponent	Rank	Site	TV	Result	Attendance
September 5	2:45 p.m.	at Tulsa*		Skelly Field at H. A. Chapman Stadium; Tulsa, OK (rivalry)	ESPNU	L 10–24	28,520
September 12	11:00 a.m.	No. 6 Oregon*		Boone Pickens Stadium; Stillwater, OK	ESPN	W 39–31	51,035
September 19	6:00 p.m.	Murray State*		Boone Pickens Stadium; Stillwater, OK	ESPN+	W 59–0	52,168
September 26	6:00 p.m.	at West Virginia		Milan Puskar Stadium; Morgantown, WV	FS1	W 41–24	57,756
October 10	11:00 a.m.	UCF	No. 18	Boone Pickens Stadium; Stillwater, OK	ESPN2	W 42–28	52,168
October 17	6:30 p.m.	at No. 20 Houston	No. 18	TDECU Stadium; Houston, TX	FOX	L 32–35	42,544
October 24	6:00 p.m.	Colorado^{†}		Boone Pickens Stadium; Stillwater, OK	FS1	W 57–24	52,168
October 31	6:00 p.m.	at Iowa State	No. 24	Jack Trice Stadium; Ames, IA	FOX	L 49–51	50,295
November 7	12:00 p.m.	at Kansas State		Bill Snyder Family Football Stadium; Manhattan, KS	TNT/TruTV	W 66–28	52,134
November 14	8:30 p.m.	No. 12 Texas Tech	No. 25	Boone Pickens Stadium; Stillwater, OK	ESPN	L 27–52	52,168
November 21	9:15 p.m.	at Arizona State		Mountain America Stadium; Tempe, AZ	ESPN	W 30–27 ^{OT}	51,154
November 28	5:15 p.m.	Kansas		Boone Pickens Stadium; Stillwater, OK	ESPN2		
*Non-conference game; ^{†}Homecoming; Rankings from AP Poll (and CFP Rankings, after November 3) – Released prior to game; All times are in Central time

== Rankings ==
Ranking movements Legend: ██ Increase in ranking ██ Decrease in ranking — = Not ranked RV = Received votes
	Week															
Poll	Pre	1	2	3	4	5	6	7	8	9	10	11	12	13	14	Final
AP	RV	—	RV	RV	19	18	18	RV	24	RV	RV	—				
Coaches	RV	—	RV	RV	RV	RV	20	RV	RV	RV	RV	RV				
CFP	Not released									—	25	—				Not released

== Personnel ==
2026 Oklahoma State Cowboys football team roster
Players
Coaches
Offense

Pos.	#	Name	Class
WR	0	Justin Bowick	Sr
WR	1	Miles Coleman	Jr
WR	2	Chris Barnes	So
WR	3	Terrence Lewis	So
WR	5	Israel Polk	Jr
RB	6	Tre Page III	So
QB	8	Broderick Vehrs	Fr
QB	9	Grant Jordan	Sr
WR	10	Wyatt Young	Jr
WR	11	Rodney Harris II	Sr
QB	12	Luke Tepas	Fr
WR	14	Jabarie Thornton	Fr
WR	15	Kam Powell	Fr
QB	17	Drew Mestemaker	So
WR	19	Dayvon Standard	Fr
RB	20	KD Jones	Fr
RB	22	William Mason	Sr
TE	23	Oscar Hammond	Sr
RB	24	Caleb Hawkins	So
RB	25	Ayo Adeyi	Sr
RB	26	Dennis Moody III	Jr
WR	29	Malachi Jackson	Jr
RB	36	Javen Hall	Fr
TE	44	Carson Kolb	So
TE	45	Morgan McPhaul	Sr
OL	50	Kole Seaton	Fr
OL	54	Johnny Dickson III	Sr
OL	56	Tyler Mercer	So
OL	57	Simona Fuailetoto	Fr
OL	58	Isaiah Bowman	Fr
OL	62	Jamison Mejia	Jr
OL	63	Caleb Hackleman	So
OL	66	Louie Canepa	Sr
OL	67	Braydon Nelson	Jr
OL	68	Joseph Hanson	Sr
OL	70	Shaun Torgeson	So
OL	71	Miguel Chavez	Fr
OL	72	O'Ryan Mosley	Fr
OL	73	Ja'Qwon Evans	Fr
OL	74	Eli Holbrook	Fr
OL	75	Jakobe Sanders	Jr
OL	76	Desmond Magiya	Jr
OL	77	Ashton Lepo	Sr
OL	78	Kai Holec	So
OL	79	Jacob Sexton	Sr
TE	81	Donovan Green	Sr
TE	82	Luke Logan	So
WR	83	Ty Watts	Fr
WR	84	Matrail Lopez	Fr
WR	87	Blake Hogshooter	Fr
TE	88	Bodie Boydstun	Jr
WR	89	Quincy Shelton	Fr

Defense

Pos.	#	Name	Class
DE	0	Malik Charles	Sr
S	1	Evan Jackson	Sr
LB	2	Isaiah Chisom	Jr
LB	3	Tate Romney	Sr
CB	4	Mo Horn	Sr
DT	5	Saadiq Clements	Jr
S	6	Christian Bodnar	Jr
S	7	Quinton Hammonds	Jr
CB	8	Kollin Lewis	Jr
CB	9	LaDainian Fields	So
DE	10	James Williams	Sr
DE	11	Keviyan Huddleston	Jr
S	12	Cameron Epps	Sr
CB	13	Trudell Berry	Sr
CB	14	Kobi Foreman	So
DT	15	Fatafehi Vailea II	Sr
LB	16	Dallas Winner-Johnson	Jr
S	18	Mose Phillips III	Sr
DE	19	DJ Jackson Jr.	Sr
LB	20	Taurean Davis	Jr
S	22	Jeremy Cook Jr.	So
S	23	Braeden Presley	Fr
S	25	Markeith Williams	Sr
CB	26	Maliek Bracy	Fr
S	27	Vincent Holmes	Jr
CB	28	Marrel Davis III	Fr
S	29	Cooper Lai	Jr
LB	30	Trip White	Sr
DE	31	Billy Walton III	So
LB	32	Ethan Wesloski	Sr
LB	33	Jack Puckett	Sr
S	36	Bobby Deeal Jr.	Jr
DE	38	Carl'veon Young	Fr
CB	39	Jeremiah Piper	Sr
LB	40	Cooper Mailand	Jr
CB	41	Byron Stubbs	Fr
DE	44	Rashod Bradley	Jr
DT	45	Enai White	Sr
S	46	Hunter Trusler	Fr
S	47	Harrison Dempsey	Sr
LB	50	Gunnar Wilson	So
LB	52	Beau Wendel	Fr
LB	53	Christian Jones	Sr
DT	59	Xavier Mason	Sr
DE	87	DeSean Brown	Sr
DT	88	Landon Dean	Sr
DT	90	Savion Barthelemy	Fr
DE	91	Landon Bland	Fr
DT	92	Jerry Lawson	Sr
DT	93	Dominic Macon	Fr
DT	94	Braylon Rigsby	Jr
DE	95	Jaleel Johnson	Sr
DE	96	Joey Quinn	Fr
DE	97	Nygel Farsee	Fr
DT	98	Luke Webb	So
DT	99	Iman Oates	Sr

Special teams

Pos.	#	Name	Class
K	16	Sam Keltner	So
P	37	Lachie Pozzobon	So
K	41	Gabe Pendyala	Fr
LS	42	Caden Yates	Jr
LS	48	Nolan Akins	Fr
K	49	Joseph Kim	Jr
P	85	Nate Ost	Sr

Head coach

- Eric Morris

Coordinators/assistant coaches

- Drew Svoboda – Associate head coach / special teams coordinator / tight ends
- Sean Brophy – Offensive coordinator / quarterbacks
- Skyler Cassity – Defensive coordinator
- Patrick Cobbs – Run game coordinator / running backs
- Cody Crill – Offensive line
- Nick Edwards – Wide receivers
- Reggie Johnson – Linebackers
- Jordan Malone – Nickels / safeties
- Greg Richmond – Defensive line
- Julian Wilson – Cornerbacks
- Ike Eguae – Assistant defensive line
- Mike O'Guin – Assistant defensive line
- Luke Brockermeyer – Assistant outside linebackers
- Dan Conwell – Assistant special teams
- Boone Feldt – Assistant offensive line
- Robbie Gordon – Assistant inside linebackers
- Taylor Grimes – Assistant wide receivers
- Deion Harris – Assistant offensive line
- Kevin Kilmer – Senior offensive analyst / assistant quarterbacks
- Mason Moss – Assistant cornerbacks
- Luke Pardee – Assistant tight ends
- Ryan Roberts – Assistant safeties
- Tyler Gillman – Special teams analyst
- Beau Kelly – Offensive analyst
- Bryan Kegans – Head football strength & conditioning
- Dylan Lowenstein – Associate director of strength & conditioning
- Gary Calcagno – Assistant director of strength & conditioning
- Ryan Ojeda – Strength & conditioning assistant
- Andrew Williams – Strength & conditioning assistant
- Aditya Keshavapatnam – Data scientist
- Rolando Surita – Chief of staff
- Raj Murti – General manager
- Steve Keasler – Special assistant to the head coach
- George Matsakis – Director, football operations
- Whitney Volentine – Assistant director of football operations
- Ethan Russo – Executive director, player personnel
- Wes Drake – Director, scouting
- Trey Klose – Assistant director, player personnel
- Andrew Lee – Assistant director, player personnel
- Jason Martinez – Assistant director, player personnel
- Rod Johnson – Director, player engagement / alumni relations
- Erika Vickers – Director, football administration
- O'nalisa Hall – Director, on-campus recruiting
- Meghan Bartlett – Assistant director, on-campus recruiting

Legend

- (C) Team captain
- (S) Suspended
- (I) Ineligible
- Injured
- Redshirt

Roster

== Game summaries ==
=== at Tulsa (rivalry) ===
Oklahoma State Cowboys (0–0) at Tulsa Golden Hurricane (0–0) – Game summary

Quarter	1	2	3	4	Total
Cowboys	0	3	7	0	10
Golden Hurricane	3	7	7	7	24

at Skelly Field at H. A. Chapman Stadium • Tulsa, Oklahoma

- Date: September 5
- Game time: 2:45 p.m.
- Game weather: Sunny • Temperature: 97 °F (36 °C) • Wind: SE at 5 miles per hour (8.0 km/h)
- Game attendance: 28,520
- Referee: Michael VanderVelde
- TV announcers (ESPNU): Mike Corey (play-by-play) and Barrett Brooks (analyst)

Game information

First quarter

- (2:18) TLSA ― Marlon Hauck 40-yard field goal (Drive: 9 plays, 75 yards, 5:30; Tulsa 3–0)

Second quarter

- (2:04) OKST ― Sam Keltner 35-yard field goal (Drive: 8 plays, 62 yards, 3:21; Tied 3–3)
- (0:21) TLSA ― Damari Alston 1-yard run, Marlon Hauck Kick (Drive: 8 plays, 75 yards, 1:43; Tulsa 10–3)

Third quarter

- (7:00) TLSA ― Oran Singleton 21-yard pass from Baylor Hayes; Owen Carey kick (Drive: 6 plays, 59 yards, 3:10; Tulsa 17–3)
- (1:52) OKST ― Miles Coleman 16-yard pass from Drew Mestemaker, Sam Keltner kick (Drive: 11 plays, 75 yards, 5:08; Tulsa 17–10)

Fourth quarter

- (7:52) TLSA ― Damari Alston 29-yard run, Owen Carey kick (Drive: 2 plays, 34 yards, 0:46; Tulsa 24–10)

Statistics	OKST	TLSA
First downs	27	15
Plays–yards	86−368	57–361
Rushes–yards	37–127	33–134
Passing yards	241	227
Passing: comp–att–int	29–49–2	17–24–1
Turnovers	4	1
Time of possession	31:05	28:55

Team	Category	Player	Statistics
Oklahoma State	Passing	Drew Mestemaker	29/49, 241 yards, TD, 2 INT
Oklahoma State	Rushing	Caleb Hawkins	18 carries, 79 yards
Oklahoma State	Receiving	Wyatt Young	8 receptions, 84 yards
Tulsa	Passing	Baylor Hayes	17/24, 227 yards, TD, INT
Tulsa	Rushing	Damari Alston	15 carries, 73 yards, 2 TD
Tulsa	Receiving	Jimmy Calloway	5 receptions, 71 yards

=== vs. No. 6 Oregon ===
No. 6 Oregon Ducks (1–0) at Oklahoma State Cowboys (0–1) – Game summary

Quarter	1	2	3	4	Total
No. 6 Ducks	7	10	7	7	31
Cowboys	3	21	6	9	39

at Boone Pickens Stadium • Stillwater, Oklahoma

- Date: September 12
- Game time: 11:00 a.m.
- Game weather: Sunny • Temperature: 89 °F (32 °C) • Wind: NE at 12 miles per hour (19 km/h)
- Game attendance: 51,035
- Referee: Villar Francisco
- TV announcers (ESPN): Dave Pasch (play-by-play), Dusty Dvoracek (analyst), and Taylor McGregor (sideline)

Game information

First quarter

- (10:51) OKST − Sam Keltner 20-yard field goal (Drive: 5 plays, 76 yards, 2:50; OKST 3−0)
- (9:32) ORE − Devon Jackson 96-yard interception return, Gage Hurych kick (ORE 7−3)

Second quarter

- (12:54) OKST − Carson Kolb 1-yard pass from Drew Mestemaker, Sam Keltner kick (Drive: 5 plays, 47 yards, 2:20; OKST 10−7)
- (8:35) OKST − Caleb Hawkins 5-yard run, Sam Keltner kick (Drive: 8 plays, 65 yards, 2:31; OKST 17−7)
- (5:26) ORE − Jordon Davison 1-yard run, Gage Hurych kick (Drive: 1 play, 1 yard, 0:04; OKST 17−14)
- (3:47) OKST − Wyatt Young 52-yard pass from Drew Mestemaker, Sam Keltner kick (Drive: 4 plays, 75 yards, 1:39; OKST 24−14)
- (0:30) ORE − Gage Hurych 42-yard field goal (Drive: 11 plays, 41 yards, 3:17; OKST 24−17)

Third quarter

- (11:50) OKST − Sam Keltner 24-yard field goal (Drive: 10 plays, 69 yards, 3:10; OKST 27−17)
- (9:12) ORE − Dakorien Moore 36-yard pass from Dante Moore, Gage Hurych kick (Drive: 6 plays, 75 yards, 2:38; OKST 27-24)
- (0:31) OKST − Sam Keltner 44-yard field goal (Drive: 11 plays, 26 yards, 4:06; OKST 30−24)

Forth quarter

- (14:51) ORE − Evan Stewart 38-yard pass from Dante Moore, Gage Hurych kick (Drive: 3 plays, 35 yards, 0:40; ORE 31−30)
- (10:21) OKST − Drew Mestemaker 10-yard run, 2 point failed (Drive: 13 plays, 75 yards, 4:30; OKST 36−31)
- (3:11) OKST − Sam Keltner 31-yard field goal (Drive: 6 plays, 20 yards, 3:37; OKST 39−31)

Statistics	ORE	OKST
First downs	12	25
Plays–yards	59–281	83–554
Rushes–yards	90–281	237–554
Passing yards	191	317
Passing: comp–att–int	14–29–0	26–43–2
Turnovers	1	2
Time of possession	23:06	36:54

Team	Category	Player	Statistics
Oregon	Passing	Dante Moore	14/29, 191 yards, 2 TD
Oregon	Rushing	Dierre Hill	15 carries, 74 yards
Oregon	Receiving	Evan Stewart	4 receptions, 78 yards, TD
Oklahoma State	Passing	Drew Mestemaker	26/43, 317 yards, 2 TD, 2 INT
Oklahoma State	Rushing	Caleb Hawkins	23 carries, 110 yards, TD
Oklahoma State	Receiving	Wyatt Young	5 receptions, 121 yards, TD

=== vs. Murray State (FCS) ===
Murray State Racers (FCS) (1–2) at Oklahoma State Cowboys (1–1) – Game summary

Quarter	1	2	3	4	Total
Racers (FCS)	0	0	0	0	0
Cowboys	14	17	21	7	59

at Boone Pickens Stadium • Stillwater, Oklahoma

- Date: September 19
- Game time: 6:00 p.m.
- Game weather: Sunny • Temperature: 99 °F (37 °C) • Wind: SE at 11 miles per hour (18 km/h)
- Game attendance: 52,168
- Referee: Tutashinda Salaam
- TV announcers (ESPN+): James Westling (play-by-play) and Jeff Woody (analyst)

Game information

First Quarter

- (9:15) OKST − Miles Coleman 2 yard pass from Drew Mestemaker, Sam Keltner kick (Drive: 8 plays, 72 yards, 2:58; OKST 7−0)
- (2:35) OKST − Wyatt Young 13 yard pass from Drew Mestemaker, Sam Keltner kick (Drive: 8 plays, 80 yards, 3:10; OKST 14−0)

Second Quarter

- (13:05) OKST − Justin Bowick 24 yard pass from Drew Mestemaker, Sam Keltner kick (Drive: 7 plays, 86 yards, 2:59; OKST 21−0)
- (7:47) OKST − Sam Keltner 23 yard field goal (Drive: 6 plays, 67 yards, 3:26; OKST 24−0)
- (3:41) OKST − Justin Bowick 36 yard pass from Drew Mestemaker, Sam Keltner kick (Drive: 5 plays, 73 yards, 2:07; OKST 31−0)

Third Quarter

- (13:35) OKST − Terrence Lewis 31 yard pass from Drew Mestemaker, Sam Keltner kick (Drive: 4 plays, 62 yards, 1:20; OKST 38−0)
- (8:22) OKST − Carson Kolb 10 yard pass from Broderick Vehrs, Sam Keltner kick (Drive: 7 plays, 73 yards, 3:28; OKST 45−0)
- (2:17) OKST − Tre Page III 6 yard rush, Sam Keltner kick (Drive: 9 plays, 57 yards, 4:41; OKST 52−0)

Fourth Quarter

- (12:47) OKST − KD Jones 6 yard rush, Sam Keltner kick (Drive: 5 plays, 40 yards, 2:46; OKST 59−0)

Statistics	MUR	OKST
First downs	5	33
Plays–yards	46–160	73–662
Rushes–yards	23–76	45–301
Passing yards	84	361
Passing: comp–att–int	14–23–1	26–28–0
Turnovers	1	1
Time of possession	24:52	35:08

Team	Category	Player	Statistics
Murray State	Passing	Jim Ogle	13/21, 79 yards
Murray State	Rushing	Dylan Embry	2 carries, 26 yards
Murray State	Receiving	Dimitri Howard	1 receptions, 38 yards
Oklahoma State	Passing	Drew Mestemaker	20/22, 324 yards, 5 TD
Oklahoma State	Rushing	Caleb Hawkins	11 carries, 72 yards
Oklahoma State	Receiving	Justin Bowick	9 receptions, 178 yards, 2 TD

=== at West Virginia ===
Oklahoma State Cowboys (2–1) at West Virginia Mountaineers (3–0) – Game summary

Quarter	1	2	3	4	Total
Cowboys	3	10	15	13	41
Mountaineers	7	7	10	0	24

at Milan Puskar Stadium • Morgantown, West Virginia

- Date: September 26
- Game time: 6:00 p.m.
- Game weather: clear • Temperature: 99 °F (37 °C) • Wind: N at 66 miles per hour (106 km/h)
- Game attendance: 57,756
- Referee: Kevin Mar
- TV announcers (FS1): Eric Collins (play-by-play) and Spencer Tillman (analyst)

Game information

First Quarter

- (7:44) WVU ― Michael Hawkins Jr. 5 yard rush, Jack Cassidy kick (Drive: 5 plays, 95 yards, 1:41; WVU 7―0)
- (3:12) OSU ― Sam Keltner 30 yard field goal (Drive: 11 plays, 63 yards, 4:28; WVU 7―3)

Second Quarter

- (11:52) WVU ― Michael Hawkins Jr. 3 yard rush, Jack Cassidy kick (Drive: 16 plays, 75 yards, 6:20; WVU 14―3)
- (7:56) OSU ― Sam Keltner 19 yard field goal (Drive: 9 plays, 74 yards, 3:56; WVU 14―6)
- (1:25) OSU ― Justin Bowick 21 yard pass from Drew Mestemaker (Drive: 6 plays, 55 yards, 2:22; WVU 14―13)

Third Quarter

- (11:06) WVU ― Michael Hawkins Jr. 9 yard rush, Jack Cassidy kick (Drive: 7 plays, 82 yards, 2:19; WVU 21―13)
- (9:33) OSU ― Terrence Lewis 4 yard pass from Drew Mestemaker, Terrence Lewis pass from Drew Mestemaker) (Drive: 4 plays, 75 yards, 1:33; Tied 21―21)
- (3:55) WVU ― Jack Cassidy 27 yard field goal (Drive: 14 plays, 66 yards, 5:38; WVU 24―21)
- (2:40) OSU ― Caleb Hawkins 22 yard rush, Sam Keltner kick (Drive: 3 plays, 75 yards, 1:15; OSU 28―24)

Fourth Quarter

- (13:58) OSU ― Sam Keltner 29 yard field goal (Drive: 5 plays, 47 yards, 1:41; OSU 31―24)
- (5:42) OSU ― Wyatt Young 6 yard pass from Drew Mestemaker, Sam Keltner kick (Drive: 10 plays, 80 yards, 4:27; OSU 38―24)
- (2:46) OSU ― Sam Keltner 47 yard field goal (Drive: 6 plays, 22 yards, 1:47; OSU 41―24)

Statistics	OKST	WVU
First downs	25	29
Plays–yards	68―609	87―466
Rushes–yards	220	334
Passing yards	389	132
Passing: comp–att–int	20―27―1	10―22―1
Time of possession		

Team	Category	Player	Statistics
Oklahoma State	Passing	Drew Mestemaker	20/27, 389 yards, 3 TD, INT
Oklahoma State	Rushing	Caleb Hawkins	31 carries, 180 yards, TD
Oklahoma State	Receiving	Wyatt Young	8 receptions, 192 yards, TD
West Virginia	Passing	Michael Hawkins Jr.	10/22, 132 yards, INT
West Virginia	Rushing	Cam Cook	29 carries, 193 yards
West Virginia	Receiving	DJ Epps	2 receptions, 39 yards

=== vs. UCF ===
UCF Knights (3–2) at No. 18 Oklahoma State Cowboys (3–1) – Game summary

Quarter	1	2	3	4	Total
Knights	14	7	0	7	28
No. 18 Cowboys	7	14	3	18	42

at Boone Pickens Stadium • Stillwater, Oklahoma

- Date: October 10
- Game time: 11:00 a.m.
- Game weather: Sunny • Temperature: 80 °F (27 °C) • Wind: SW at 9 mph
- Game attendance: 52,168
- Referee: Kevin Boitmann
- TV announcers (ESPN2): Lowell Galindo (play-by-play), Kirk Morrison (analyst), and Dawn Davenport (sideline)

Game information

First quarter

- UCF – Grayson Brousseau 1-yard pass from Keyone Jenkins (Will Stone Kick), 10:08, Knights 7–0. Drive: 9 plays, 42 yards, 4:28.
- OKST – Drew Mestemaker 11-yard run (Sam Keltner kick), 6:19 Tied 7–7. Drive: 8 plays, 75 yards, 3:49.
- UCF – Josh Derry 12-yard pass from Keyone Jenkins (Will Stone Kick), 2:37, Knights 14–7. Drive: 7 plays, 75 yards, 3:42.

Second quarter

- OKST – Morgan McPhaul 1-yard run (Sam Keltner kick), 13:03 Tied 14–14. Drive: 12 plays, 75 yards, 4:34.
- OKST – Justin Bowick 18-yard pass from Drew Mestemaker (Sam Keltner Kick), 2:03, Cowboys 21–14. Drive: 5 plays, 60 yards, 2:03.
- UCF – Tyren Hornes 3-yard pass from Keyone Jenkins (Will Stone Kick), 0:13, Tied 21–21. Drive: 12 plays, 75 yards, 1:50.

Third quarter

- OKST – Sam Keltner 40-yard field goal, 7:19, Cowboys 24–21. Drive: 9 plays, 63 yards, 3:44.

Fourth quarter

- OKST – Sam Keltner 29-yard field goal, 12:11, Cowboys 27–21. Drive: 8 plays, 62 yards, 3:06.
- OKST – Evan Jackson 28-yard fumble return, 10:32 (Drew Mestemaker run), Cowboys 35–21. Drive: 5 plays, 2 yards, 1:33.
- OKST – Wyatt Young 5-yard pass from Drew Mestemaker (Sam Keltner Kick), 7:30, Cowboys 42–21. Drive: 3 plays, 34 yards, 1:25.
- UCF – Caden Piening 4-yard pass from Keyone Jenkins (Will Stone Kick), 3:57, Cowboys 42–28. Drive: 11 plays, 75 yards, 3:33.

Statistics	UCF	OKST
First downs	27	22
Plays–yards	83–375	60–414
Rushes–yards	41–110	32–110
Passing yards	265	304
Passing: comp–att–int	30–42–1	19–28–0
Time of possession	35:15	24:45

Team	Category	Player	Statistics
UCF	Passing	Keyone Jenkins	30/42, 265 yards, 4 TD, INT
UCF	Rushing	Duke Watson	21 carries, 79 yards
UCF	Receiving	Josh Derry	11 receptions, 84 yards, TD
Oklahoma State	Passing	Drew Mestemaker	19/28, 304 yards, 2 TD
Oklahoma State	Rushing	Caleb Hawkins	23 carries, 83 yards
Oklahoma State	Receiving	Justin Bowick	6 receptions, 98 yards, TD

=== at No. 20 Houston ===
No. 18 Oklahoma State Cowboys (4–1) at No. 20 Houston Cougars (5–1) – Game summary

Quarter	1	2	3	4	Total
No. 18 Cowboys	3	0	14	15	32
No. 20 Cougars	7	7	14	7	35

at TDECU Stadium • Houston, Texas

- Date: October 17
- Game time: 6:30 p.m.
- Game weather: Clear • Temperature: 69 °F (21 °C) • Wind: NE at 11 miles per hour (18 km/h)
- Game attendance: 42,544
- Referee: Stephen Baron
- TV announcers (FOX): Jack Kizer (play-by-play) and Mark Helfrich (analyst)

Game information
First quarter
- OKST – Sam Keltner 23-yard field goal, 8:39. Cowboys 3–0. Drive: 7 plays, 43 yards, 2:53.
- HOU – Patrick Overmyer 2-yard pass from Conner Weigman (Jonathan Dimas kick), 2:19. Cougars 7–3. Drive: 12 plays, 75 yards, 6:20.

Second quarter

- HOU – Amare Thomas 7-yard pass from Conner Weigman (Jonathan Dimas kick), 2:22. Cougars 14–3. Drive: 7 plays, 25 yards, 3:00.

Third quarter

- OKST – Ayo Adeyi 13-yard run (Sam Keltner kick), 10:57. Cougars 14–10. Drive: 8 plays, 75 yards, 4:03.
- HOU – Trent Walker 2-yard pass from Conner Weigman (Jonathan Dimas kick), 9:05. Cougars 21–10. Drive: 6 plays, 75 yards, 1:52.
- OKST – Wyatt Young 2-yard pass from Drew Mestemaker (Sam Keltner kick), 4:45. Cougars 21–17. Drive: 10 plays, 90 yards, 4:16.
- HOU – Amare Thomas 21-yard pass from Conner Weigman (Jonathan Dimas kick), 2:00. Cougars 28–17. Drive: 7 plays, 75 yards, 2:45.

Fourth quarter

- OKST – Caleb Hawkins 66-yard pass from Drew Mestemaker (Drew Mestemaker pass to Justin Bowick), 11:57. Cougars 28–25. Drive: 1 play, 66 yards, 0:11.
- HOU – Koby Young 48-yard pass from Conner Weigman (Jonathan Dimas kick), 9:48. Cougars 35–25. Drive: 5 plays, 85 yards, 2:04.
- OKST – Justin Bowick 8-yard pass from Drew Mestemaker (Sam Keltner kick), 4:54. Cougars 35–32. Drive: 10 plays, 96 yards, 4:51.

Statistics	OKST	HOU
First downs	25	26
Plays–yards	59–499	73–505
Rushes–yards	25–134	40–162
Passing yards	365	343
Passing: comp–att–int	22–34–1	24–33–1
Time of possession	24:48	35:12

Team	Category	Player	Statistics
Oklahoma State	Passing	Drew Mestemaker	22/34, 365 yards, 3 TD, INT
Oklahoma State	Rushing	Caleb Hawkins	17 carries, 68 yards
Oklahoma State	Receiving	Caleb Hawkins	7 receptions, 125 yards, TD
Houston	Passing	Conner Weigman	24/33, 343 yards, 5 TD, INT
Houston	Rushing	Makhi Hughes	18 carries, 77 yards
Houston	Receiving	Amare Thomas	7 receptions, 126 yards, 2 TD

=== vs. Colorado ===
Colorado Buffaloes (2–4) at Oklahoma State Cowboys (4–2) – Game summary

Quarter	1	2	3	4	Total
Buffaloes	14	10	0	0	24
Cowboys	7	16	14	20	57

at Boone Pickens Stadium • Stillwater, Oklahoma

- Date: October 24
- Game time: 6:00 p.m.
- Game weather: Sunny • Temperature: 75 °F (24 °C) • Wind: SE 8 mph
- Game attendance: 52,168
- Referee: Cravonne Barrett
- TV announcers (FS1): Carlo Jimenez (play-by-play) and Robert Smith (analyst)

Game information

First quarter

- (14:01) OKST – Miles Coleman 47-yard pass from Drew Mestemaker, Sam Keltner kick (Drive: 3 plays, 75 yards, 0:59; Oklahoma State 7–0)
- (7:23) COLO – JaQuail Smith 4-yard pass from Isaac Wilson, Elliot Arnold kick (Drive: 12 plays, 75 yards, 6:38; Tied 7–7)
- (0:03) COLO – DeAndre Moore Jr. 15-yard pass from Isaac Wilson, Elliot Arnold kick (Drive: 11 plays, 71 yards, 5:39; Colorado 14–7)

Second quarter

- (11:48) OKST – Sam Keltner 47-yard field goal (Drive: 10 plays, 46 yards, 3:15; Colorado 14–10)
- (8:48) OKST – Justin Bowick 14-yard pass from Drew Mestemaker, Sam Keltner kick (Drive: 4 plays, 69 yards, 1:35; Oklahoma State 17–14)
- (6:19) COLO – Isaac Wilson 1-yard run, Elliot Arnold kick (Drive: 6 plays, 75 yards, 2:29; Colorado 21–17)
- (4:14) OKST – Sam Keltner 30-yard field goal (Drive: 6 plays, 64 yards, 2:05; Colorado 21–20)
- (2:30) COLO – Elliot Arnold kick 45-yard field goal (Drive: 5 plays, 48 yards, 1:44; Colorado 24–20)
- (0:14) OKST – Sam Keltner 41-yard field goal (Drive: 11 plays, 52 yards, 2:16; Colorado 24–23)

Third quarter

- (14:11) OKST – Morgan McPhaul 3-yard pass from Drew Mestemaker, Sam Keltner kick (Drive: 2 plays, 13 yards, 0:44; Oklahoma State 30–24)
- (8:48) OKST – William Mason 3-yard run, Sam Keltner kick (Drive: 8 plays, 78 yards, 2:39; Oklahoma State 37–24)

Fourth quarter

- (14:17) OKST – Sam Keltner 21-yard field goal (Drive: 11 plays, 64 yards, 4:37; Oklahoma State 40–24)
- (9:29) OKST – Wyatt Young 28-yard pass from Drew Mestemaker, Sam Keltner kick (Drive: 6 plays, 62 yards, 3:15; Oklahoma State 47–24)
- (7:01) OKST – Sam Keltner 30-yard field goal (Drive: 4 plays, -3 yards, 0:47; Oklahoma State 50–24)
- (1:18) OKST – Tre Page III 18-yard run, Sam Keltner kick (Drive: 8 plays, 58 yards, 4:42; Oklahoma State 57–24)

Statistics	COLO	OKST
First downs	18	28
Plays–yards	62–399	76–598
Rushes–yards	30–56	38–188
Passing yards	343	410
Passing: comp–att–int	22–32–2	23–38–0
Time of possession	29:15	30:45

Team	Category	Player	Statistics
Colorado	Passing	Isaac Wilson	19/27, 280 yards, 2 TD, 2 INT
Colorado	Rushing	JaQuail Smith	13 carries, 39 yards
Colorado	Receiving	Joseph Williams	9 receptions, 135 yards
Oklahoma State	Passing	Drew Mestemaker	21/36, 386 yards, 4 TD
Oklahoma State	Rushing	Caleb Hawkins	19 carries, 120 yards
Oklahoma State	Receiving	Justin Bowick	5 receptions, 138 yards, TD

=== at Iowa State ===
No. 24 Oklahoma State Cowboys (5–2) at Iowa State Cyclones (3–4) – Game summary

Quarter	1	2	3	4	Total
No. 24 Cowboys	14	7	7	21	49
Cyclones	7	17	14	13	51

at Jack Trice Stadium • Ames, Iowa

- Date: October 31
- Game time: 6:00 p.m.
- Game weather: Cloudy • Temperature: 62 °F (17 °C) • Wind: SE at 2 miles per hour (3.2 km/h)
- Game attendance: 50,295
- Referee: Michael McCabe
- TV announcers (FOX): Tim Brando (play-by-play), Devin Gardner (analyst), and Josh Sims (sideline)

Game information

First Quarter

- (12:38) ISU ― Aiden Flora 29 yard rush, Kyle Konrardy kick (Drive: 5 plays, 75 yards, 2:22; ISU 7―0)
- (6:33) OSU ― Wyatt Young 10 yard pass from Drew Mestemaker, Sam Keltner kick (Drive: 12 plays, 75 yards, 6:05; Tied 7―7)
- (3:46) OSU ― Caleb Hawkins 59 yard pass from Drew Mestemaker, Sam Keltner kick (Drive: 3 plays, 70 yards, 0:53: OSU 14―7)

Second Quarter

- (12:17) ISU ― Easton Miller 2 yard pass from Jaylen Raynor, Kyle Konrardy kick (Drive: 3 plays, 52 yards, 1:26; Tied 14―14)
- (10:51) ISU ― Jamal Polite Jr. 43 yard pass from Jaylen Raynor, Kyle Konrardy kick (Drive: 3 plays, 52 yards, 1:26; ISU 21―14)
- (6:19) OSU ― Justin Bowick 11 yard pass from Drew Mestemaker, Sam Keltner kick (Drive: 9 plays, 75 yards, 4:32; Tied 21―21)
- (0:07) ISU ― Kyle Konrardy 39 yard field goal (Drive: 8 plays, 15 yards, 2:19; ISU 24―21)

Third Quarter

- (5:46) ISU ― Jaylen Raynor 8 yard rush, Kyle Konrardy kick (Drive: 10 plays, 91 yards, 6:08; ISU 31―21)
- (5:29) OSU ― Caleb Hawkins 75 yard rush, Sam Keltner kick (Drive: 2 plays, 75 yards, 0:17; ISU 31―28)
- (1:18) ISU ― Cameron Pettaway 40 yard pass from Jaylen Raynor, Kyle Konrardy kick (Drive: 7 plays, 75 yards, 4:11; ISU 38―28)

Fourth Quarter

- (11:19) OSU ― Justin Brooks 41 yard pass from Drew Mestemaker, Sam Keltner kick (Drive: 9 plays, 75 yards, 3:25; ISU 38―35)
- (11:08) ISU ― Aiden Flora 75 yard rush, Kyle Konrardy kick (Drive: 1 play, 75 yards, 0:11; ISU 45―35)
- (8:00) OSU ― Caleb Hawkins 1 yard rush, Sam Keltner kick (Drive: 14 plays, 75 yards, 3:08; ISU 45―42)
- (2:56) ISU ― Kyle Konrardy 29 yard field goal (Drive: 6 plays, 18 yards, 1:39; ISU 48―42)
- (0:53) OSU ― Wyatt Young 7 yard pass from Drew Mestemaker, Sam Keltner Kick (Drive: 12 plays, 75 yards, 2:03; OSU 49―48)
- (0:00) ISU ― Kyle Konrardy 34 yard field goal (Drive: 5 plays, 47 yards, 0:53; ISU 51―49)

Statistics	OKST	ISU
First downs	27	24
Plays–yards	74―533	72―581
Rushes–yards	32―210	44―272
Passing yards	323	309
Passing: comp–att–int	27―42―1	18―28―1
Time of possession	25:13	34:47

Team	Category	Player	Statistics
Oklahoma State	Passing	Drew Mestemaker	27/42, 323 yards, 5 TD, INT
Oklahoma State	Rushing	Caleb Hawkins	25 carries, 194 yards, 2 TD
Oklahoma State	Receiving	Justin Bowick	7 receptions, 124 yards, 2 TD
Iowa State	Passing	Jaylen Raynor	18/28, 309 yards, 3 TD, INT
Iowa State	Rushing	Aiden Flora	29 carries, 221 yards, 2 TD
Iowa State	Receiving	Jamal Polite Jr.	6 receptions, 171 yards, TD

=== at Kansas State ===
Oklahoma State Cowboys (5–3) at Kansas State Wildcats (4–4) – Game summary

Quarter	1	2	3	4	Total
Cowboys	28	21	14	3	66
Wildcats	7	7	7	7	28

at Bill Snyder Family Football Stadium • Manhattan, Kansas

- Date: November 7
- Game time: 12:00 p.m.
- Game weather: Cloudy • Temperature: 47 °F (8 °C) • Wind: SW at 5 miles per hour (8.0 km/h)
- Game attendance: 52,134
- Referee: Kevin Boitmann
- TV announcers (TNT/TruTV): J.B. Long (play-by-play), Mike Golic Jr. (analyst), Jared Greenberg (sideline)

Game information

First Quarter

- (12:21) OSU ― Justin Bowick 32 yard pass from Drew Mestemaker, Sam Keltner kick (Drive: 3 plays, 72 yards, 0:56; OSU 7―0)
- (11:18) KSU ― Derrick Salley Jr. 73 yard pass from Blake Barnett, Luis Rodriguez kick (Drive: 3 plays, 77 yards, 1:03; Tied 7―7)
- (8:24) OSU ― Caleb Hawkins 21 yard rush, Sam Keltner kick (Drive: 7 plays, 75 yards, 2:54; OSU 14―7)
- (5:00) OSU ― Caleb Hawkins 37 yard rush, Sam Keltner kick (Drive: 3 plays, 64 yards, 0:50; OSU 21―7)
- (0:50) OSU ― Morgan McPhaul 3 yard pass from Drew Mestemaker, Sam Keltner kick (Drive: 3 plays, 13 yards, 1:21; OSU 28―7)

Second Quarter

- (10:37) KSU ― Lorgan Bartley 18 yard INT Return, Luis Rodriquez kick (Drive: 1 play, 0 yards, 0:08; OSU 28―14)
- (8:26) OSU ― Drew Mestemaker 1 yard rush, Sam Keltner kick (Drive: 5 plays, 43 yards, 2:11; OSU 35―14)
- (3:22) OSU ― Caleb Hawkins 9 yard rush, Sam Keltner kick (Drive: 3 plays, 17 yards, 1:02; OSU 42―14)
- (0:11) OSU ― Miles Coleman 19 yard pass from Drew Mestemaker, Sam Keltner kick (Drive: 6 plays, 86 yards, 1:26; OSU 49―14)

Third Quarter

- (9:27) KSU ― Derrick Salley Jr. 18 yard pass from Dillon Duff, Luis Rodriquez (Drive: 8 plays, 45 yards, 4:04; OSU 49―21)
- (6:25) OSU ― Caleb Hawkins 5 yard pass from Drew Mestemaker, Sam Keltner kick (Drive: 7 plays, 68 yards, 2:58; OSU 56―21)
- (3:29) OSU ― Drew Mestemaker 5 yard pass from Wyatt Young, Sam Keltner kick (Drive: 4 plays, 29 yards, 2:06; OSU 63―21)

Fourth Quarter

- (10:55) KSU ― Rodney Fields Jr. 1 yard rush, Luis Rodriguez kick (Drive: 15 plays, 66 yards, 7:25; OSU 63―28)
- (4:20) OSU ― Sam Keltner 23 yard field goal (Drive: 10 plays, 70 yards, 6:35; OSU 66―28)

Statistics	OKST	KSU
First downs	29	16
Plays–yards	64―565	73―327
Rushes–yards	34―223	39―127
Passing yards	342	200
Passing: comp–att–int	24―30―1	17―34―3
Time of possession	27:53	32:07

Team	Category	Player	Statistics
Oklahoma State	Passing	Drew Mestemaker	22/28, 313 yards, 4 TD, INT
Oklahoma State	Rushing	Caleb Hawkins	20 carries, 175 yards, 3 TD
Oklahoma State	Receiving	Miles Coleman	6 receptions, 95 yards, TD
Kansas State	Passing	Blake Barnett	7/17, 106 yards, TD, 2 INT
Kansas State	Rushing	Rodney Fields Jr.	20 carries, 87 yards, TD
Kansas State	Receiving	Derrick Salley Jr.	3 receptions, 100 yards, 2 TD

=== vs. No. 12 Texas Tech ===
No. 12 Texas Tech Red Raiders (8–1) at No. 25 Oklahoma State Cowboys (6–3) – Game summary

Quarter	1	2	3	4	Total
No. 12 Red Raiders	28	7	7	17	59
No. 25 Cowboys	0	20	0	7	27

at Boone Pickens Stadium • Stillwater, Oklahoma

- Date: November 14
- Game time: 8:30 p.m.
- Game weather: Sunny • Temperature: 41 °F (5 °C) • Wind: E at 8 miles per hour (13 km/h)
- Game attendance: 52,168
- Referee: Stephen Baron
- TV announcers (ESPN): Roy Philpott (play-by-play), Brock Osweiler (analyst), and Sherree Burress (sideline)

Game information

First Quarter

- (14:46) TTU ― Malcolm Simmons 97 yard kickoff return, Stone Harrington kick (Drive: 0 plays, 0 yards, 0:14; TTU 7―0)
- (12:03) TTU ― J'Koby Williams 34 yard run, Stone Harrington kick (Drive: 2 plays, 70 yards, 0:31; TTU 14―0)
- (0:53) TTU ― Terrance Carter Jr. 8 yard pass from Thomas Castellanos, Stone Harrington kick (Drive: 5 plays, 16 yards, 2:20; TTU 21―0)

Second Quarter

- (13:30) OSU ― Sam Keltner 40 yard field goal (Drive: 6 plays, 62 yards, 2:17; TTU 21―3)
- (7:33) OSU ― Drew Mestemaker 13 yard rush, Sam Keltner kick (Drive: 1 play, 13 yards, 0:05; TTU 21―10)
- (3:55) OSU ― Morgan McPhaul 18 yard pass from Drew Mestemaker, Sam Keltner kick (Drive: 6 plays, 55 yards, 2:31; TTU 21―17)
- (3:38) TTU ― Micah Hudson 80 yard pass from Thomas Castellanos, Sam Keltner kick (Drive: 1 play, 75 yards, 0:17; TTU 28―17)
- (0:10) OSU ― Sam Keltner 24 yard kick (Drive: 13 plays, 70 yards, 3:28; TTU 28―20)

Third Quarter

- (14:54) TTU ― Malcolm Simmons 45 yard pass from Thomas Castellanos, Stone Harrington kick (Drive: 1 play, 45 yards, 0:09; TTU 35―20)

Fourth Quarter

- (14:54) TTU ― Kenny Johnson 30 yard pass from Thomas Castellanos, Stone Harrington kick (Drive: 5 plays, 77 yards, 2:20; TTU 42―20)
- (8:59 TTU ― Stone Harrington 54 yard field goal (Drive: 7 plays, 7 yards, 4:10; TTU 45―20)
- (8:12) TTU ― Cameron Dickey 2 yard rush, Stone Harrington (Drive: 2 plays, 30 yards, 0:36; TTU 52―20)
- (0:54) OSU ― William Mason 10 yard rush, Sam Keltner kick (Drive: 10 plays, 83 yards, 2:32; TTU 52―27)

Statistics	TTU	OKST
First downs	17	23
Plays–yards	60―442	87―465
Rushes–yards	36―174	38―168
Passing yards	268	297
Passing: comp–att–int	13―24	29―49―2
Time of possession	23:13	32:01

Team	Category	Player	Statistics
Texas Tech	Passing	Thomas Castellanos	12/23, 263 yards, 4 TD
Texas Tech	Rushing	J'Koby Williams	19 carries, 124 yards, TD
Texas Tech	Receiving	Micah Hudson	2 receptions, 89 yards, TD
Oklahoma State	Passing	Drew Mestemaker	27/42, 277 yards, TD, 2 INT
Oklahoma State	Rushing	Caleb Hawkins	18 carries, 91 yards
Oklahoma State	Receiving	Terrance Lewis	4 receptions, 78 yards

=== at Arizona State ===
Oklahoma State Cowboys (6–4) at Arizona State Sun Devils (6–4) – Game summary

Quarter	1	2	3	4	OT	Total
Cowboys	7	0	10	10	3	30
Sun Devils	7	17	0	3	0	27

at Mountain America Stadium • Tempe, Arizona

- Date: November 21
- Game time: 9:15 p.m.
- Game weather: Clear• Temperature: 59 °F (15 °C) • Wind: S at 0 miles per hour (0 km/h)
- Game attendance: 51,544
- Referee: Kevin Mar
- TV announcers (ESPN): Roy Philpott (play-by-play), Brock Osweiler (analyst), and Sherree Burress (sideline)

Statistics	OKST	ASU
First downs		
Plays–yards		
Rushes–yards		
Passing yards		
Passing: comp–att–int		
Time of possession		

Team	Category	Player	Statistics
Oklahoma State	Passing		
Oklahoma State	Rushing		
Oklahoma State	Receiving		
Arizona State	Passing		
Arizona State	Rushing		
Arizona State	Receiving		

=== vs. Kansas ===
Kansas Jayhawks (0–0) at Oklahoma State Cowboys (0–0) – Game summary

Quarter	1	2	3	4	Total
Jayhawks	0	0	0	0	0
Cowboys	0	0	0	0	0

at Boone Pickens Stadium • Stillwater, Oklahoma

- Date: November 28
- Game time: 5:15 p.m.
- TV: ESPN

Statistics	KU	OKST
First downs		
Plays–yards		
Rushes–yards		
Passing yards		
Passing: comp–att–int		
Time of possession		

Team	Category	Player	Statistics
Kansas	Passing		
Kansas	Rushing		
Kansas	Receiving		
Oklahoma State	Passing		
Oklahoma State	Rushing		
Oklahoma State	Receiving		
