= Prochnow =

Prochnow is a surname. Notable people with the surname include:

- Christian Prochnow (born 1982), German triathlete
- Herbert V. Prochnow (1897–1998), American businessman and writer
- Julian Prochnow (born 1986), German footballer
- Jürgen Prochnow (born 1941), German-born American actor
- Tyler Prochnow (born 1966), American lawyer and sports agent
