= Caleb Hawkins =

American football player

No. 24 – Oklahoma State Cowboys
- Position: Running back
- Class: Sophomore

Personal information
- Listed height: 6 ft 0 in (1.83 m)
- Listed weight: 219 lb (99 kg)

Career information
- High school: North Rock Creek (Shawnee, Oklahoma)
- College: North Texas (2025); Oklahoma State (2026–present)

Awards and highlights
- The American Rookie of the Year (2025); First-team All-the American (2025)
- Stats at ESPN

Caleb Hawkins is an American college football running back for the Oklahoma State Cowboys. He previously played for the North Texas Mean Green.

== Early life ==
Hawkins is from Shawnee, Oklahoma. He attended North Rock Creek High School in Shawnee, where he played football as a running back. As a junior, he ran for 1,155 yards and 16 touchdowns. He then posted 1,602 rushing yards and 28 touchdowns as a senior, while also totaling 407 receiving yards, 90 tackles and four interceptions, earning first-team all-state honors from Prep RedZone Oklahoma. A three-star recruit, he committed to play college football for the North Texas Mean Green over offers from Emporia State and Central Oklahoma.

== College career ==
Hawkins won a starting role at North Texas as a true freshman in 2025. In week four of the 2025 season, he ran 13 times for 99 yards and four touchdowns, including the game-winning score, in an overtime victory against Army, afterwards being named the 247Sports True Freshman of the week and the American Conference Offensive Player of the Week. He then tallied 140 rushing yards and two touchdowns, while also adding a 68-yard touchdown catch, the next week, in a win against South Alabama. In week ten, he ran 33 times for 197 yards and four touchdowns in an upset win over Navy. Hawkins ran for 189 yards and posted a school-record five rushing touchdowns the next week, in a win against UAB.

Hawkins was named the offensive MVP of the 2025 New Mexico Bowl.

=== Statistics ===
Legend
	Led NCAA Division I FBS
**Bold**	Career high

Year	Team	Games		Rushing				Receiving			
Year	Team	GP	GS	Att	Yds	Avg	TD	Rec	Yds	Avg	TD
2025	North Texas	13	9	231	1,434	6.2	25	32	370	11.6	4
2026	Oklahoma State	9	9	187	1,081	5.8	7	37	424	11.5	3
Career		22	18	418	2,515	6.0	32	69	794	11.5	7
