= Pace Academy =

Private school in Atlanta, Georgia, US

Location
- 966 W. Paces Ferry Rd. Atlanta, Georgia; United States; 33°50′56″N 84°25′00″W

Information
- Type: Private; Independent; day; college-preparatory school
- Motto: "To Have the Courage to Strive for Excellence"
- Religious affiliation: Nonsectarian
- Established: 1958; 68 years ago
- Headmaster: Fred Assaf
- Faculty: 156
- Teaching staff: 146.6 (FTE) (2019–20)
- Grades: K–12
- Gender: co-educational
- Enrollment: 1,108 (2019–20)
- Student to teacher ratio: 7.6 (2019–20)
- Campus size: 34 acres
- Campus type: Suburban
- Colors: Navy blue Columbia blue White
- Athletics: 19 Athletic teams
- Athletics conference: Georgia High School Association
- Mascot: Knight
- Nickname: Knights
- Accreditation: Southern Association of Colleges and Schools; National Association of Independent Schools; Atlanta Association of Independent Schools
- Tuition: Lower School: $37,360; Upper School: $43,020 (2026-27)
- Website: paceacademy.org

Pace Academy is a K–12 private, college preparatory school located at 966 West Paces Ferry Road in the Buckhead area of Atlanta, Georgia, United States. Pace has approximately 1,115 students.

== History ==
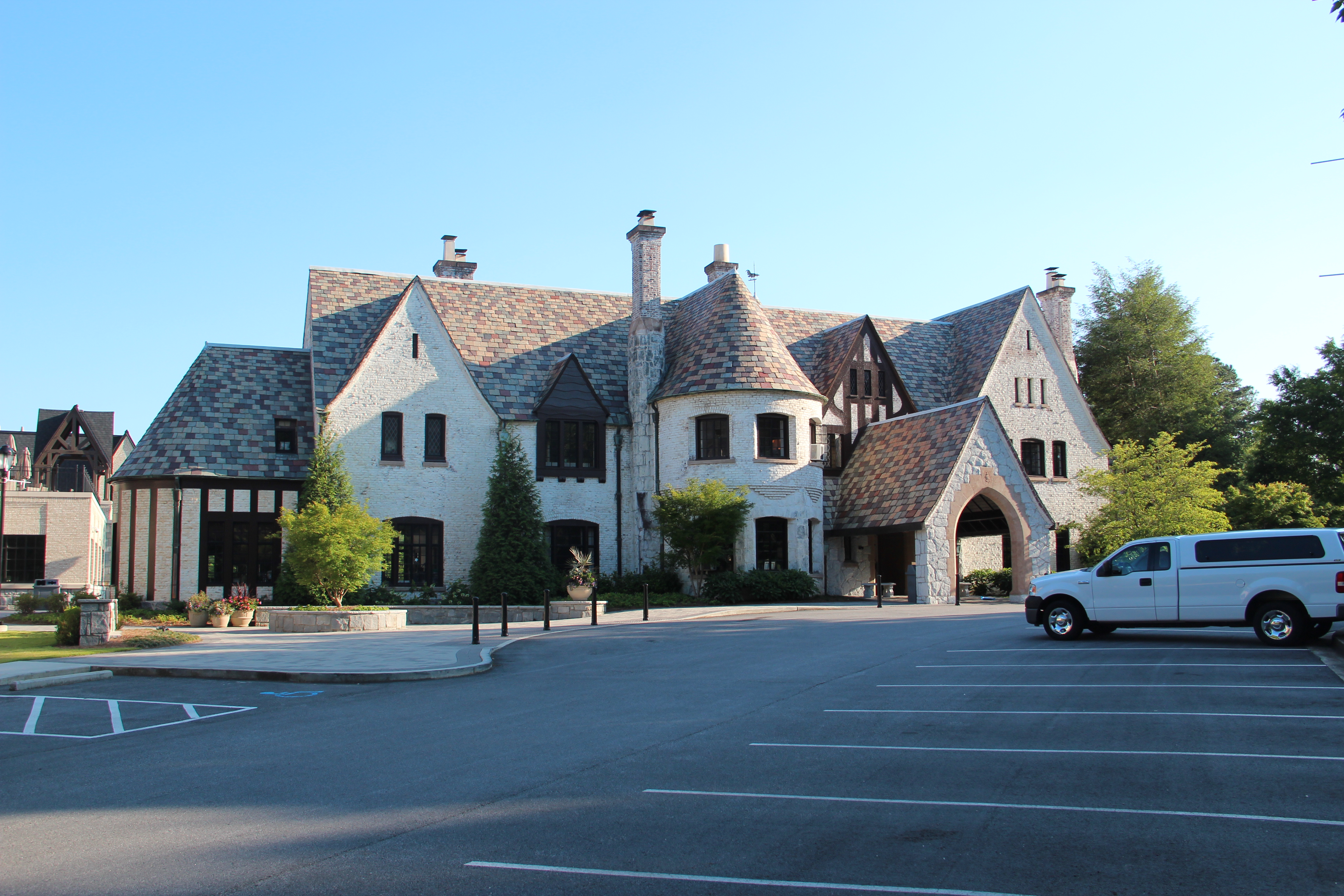
Kirkpatrick Hall

Pace Academy was founded in Atlanta in 1959 in response to the successful challenge of Atlanta Public Schools' segregationist policies in federal court. Pace Academy was founded as a de facto all-white school and was among the private schools attended by white children whose parents did not want them going to public schools with African-Americans. Although the school is not affiliated with a specific church or religion, it adheres to Judeo-Christian values; it places a major emphasis on character development.

Pace Academy is on 37 acres in Atlanta's Buckhead neighborhood. Pace Academy was incorporated on June 30, 1958, with an initial enrollment of 178 students, to " train and educate children and operate a school and kindergarten." Frank Kaley was hired as Pace's first headmaster in 1959.

In 1964, Pace graduated its first class, with 13 students receiving diplomas. Pace accepted its first African-American student, a kindergartener, in 1966.

In 1972, George G. Kirkpatrick assumed leadership of the school. Although from its incorporation, Pace was accredited by the Georgia Accreditation Committee for its educational programs, 1973 saw the accreditation of Pace by the Southern Association of Colleges and Schools. In 1976, the Randall property adjacent to Pace became available, and a fundraising drive was launched to purchase the property.

Peter Cobb became headmaster in 1994, the same year the Castle was officially named Kirkpatrick Hall in honor of George G. Kirkpatrick, who had led Pace through its most significant growth.

Following Cobb's resignation in 1996, Michael A. Murphy, who had served as head of Lower School for seven years, served as Interim Headmaster until February 1997, when he was named headmaster. In the spring of 1997, the Hugh M. Inman Foundation donated $2 million to launch the Educating for Life—Pace 2000 capital campaign, which had a goal of $16 million. During Murphy's tenure, Pace began a campaign to build a new Middle School.

In the fall of 2005, the fifth Head of the School was appointed, Fred Assaf. In 2007, the school resolved longstanding issues with the neighborhood association and entered into an agreement that preserved the small size of Pace whilst expanding the facilities to accommodate a moderate increase in enrollment. As a part of this plan, Pace realized its need to acquire expanded athletic facilities and acquired two parcels, an eight-acre baseball/softball complex on Warren Road and a 23-acre tract on Riverview Road in Cobb County, which now has a stadium for soccer, lacrosse, and football with seating for 2000, a track & field facility, an additional soccer/lacrosse/football field, a baseball field and stadium, and a softball field and stadium. Development of the softball field and the renovation of the baseball field were funded by the sale of the Warren Road complex to The Galloway School in 2016.

During the summer of 2012, Pace Academy launched a new capital campaign to build a new high school. The campaign's lead donor was Arthur Blank, who was both the owner of the Atlanta Falcons and a Pace parent. The Arthur M. Blank Family Upper School officially opened on August 18, 2014.

=== Awards and recognition ===
During the 2004–05 school year, Pace Academy was recognized with the Blue Ribbon School Award of Excellence by the United States Department of Education.

== School programs ==
Pace Academy also has a robotics team for both Middle and Upper School, the Roboknights. The Middle School team participates in the FIRST Lego League Challenge, while the Upper School team participates in the FIRST Tech Challenge.

The school's Isdell Center for Global Leadership runs global education programs.

== Sports programs ==
The baseball team won the Georgia Class A State Championship from 1993 to 1995, all of which included future Major League Baseball player Michael Barrett.

The boys' soccer team won the final three Fall Soccer League championships (2002 to 2004) and finished second nationally in the final NSCAA (National Soccer Coaches of America) poll during the fall of 2003. In its first season in the GHSA Spring League in 2006, the team captured the Class AA/A State Championship and finished 19th nationally and 5th in Region II in the Final NSCAA poll.

In 2006, the school announced plans to add a football team, with varsity play scheduled to begin in 2009. For most of its existence, the school focused on its soccer and baseball programs, opting to take part in a smaller fall soccer season to allow players to play baseball in the spring. However, the cancellation of the fall soccer season left the spring season the only option, leading the school to develop a football program.

In fall 2010, after a 9–1 regular season, the Pace Knights football team made its first GHSA playoff appearance.

== Notable alumni ==
- Jamaree Salyer (2018), LA Chargers
- Michael Barrett (1995), baseball player
- Wendell Carter Jr. (2017), basketball player
- Matthew Cleveland (2021), basketball player
- Randy Harrison (1996), actor, Queer as Folk
- Deon Jackson (2017), football player
- Clay Johnson (1995), technologist
- Sarah-Elizabeth Langford (1996), Miss America and Miss USA contestant
- Rich Middlemas (1993), film producer, Undefeated
- Lydia Dean Pilcher (1976), film and television producer
- Tyler Prochnow (1984), team owner, sports agent, entrepreneur, Kansas City Command
- Kenny Selmon (2014), track and field athlete
- Sam Sloman (2016), football player
- Andrew Thomas (2017), football player
- Bryson Tiller (2025-transferred after first year), basketball player
- Matt Towery (1978), writer and attorney
