= Tony Tiller =

American gridiron football player (born 1981)

No. 25
- Position: Cornerback

Personal information
- Born: December 20, 1981 (age 44); Melbourne, Florida, U.S.
- Listed height: 6 ft 0 in (1.83 m)
- Listed weight: 185 lb (84 kg)

Career information
- College: East Tennessee State
- NFL draft: 2004: undrafted

Career history
- Kansas City Chiefs (2004–2005); BC Lions (2005); Calgary Stampeders (2006); Hamilton Tiger-Cats (2007); Georgia Force (2008); Atlanta Falcons (2009); New York Sentinels (2009)

Awards and highlights
- 3× All-Southern Conference (2001–2003)
- Stats at CFL.ca (archive)
- Stats at ArenaFan.com

Tony Tiller (born December 20, 1981) is an American former professional football cornerback. He was signed by the BC Lions as a street free agent in 2005. He played college football at East Tennessee State.

Tiller was also a member of the Kansas City Chiefs, Calgary Stampeders, Hamilton Tiger-Cats, Georgia Force, Atlanta Falcons, and New York Sentinels.

== Early life ==
Tiller attended Stephenson High School in Lithonia, Georgia, where he lettered in football and basketball. He started at quarterback for three years, completing 147 passes for 1,742 yards and 12 touchdowns, before switching to wide receiver as a senior. He made nine receptions for 92 yards, and recorded 22 solo tackles and four interceptions as a defensive back, earning all-county honors.

== College career ==
Tiller was originally recruited to East Tennessee State as a wide receiver, catching seven passes for 89 yards as a freshman, before was converted to a cornerback ahead of his sophomore season in 2001. He earned second-team all-Southern Conference (SoCon) honors after leading the conference with seven interceptions. Ahead of his junior season, Tiller was rated the second-best cornerback in Division I-AA by the College Sporting News. He earned first-team All-SoCon honors after recording 41 tackles and one interception. As a senior in 2003, Tiller recorded 18 tackles and four interceptions, earning first-team All-SoCon honors despite missing the last five games of the season due to injury.

== Personal life ==
His son, Bryson, is one of the top ranked basketball recruits in the class of 2025.
