= Justin Bowick =

American football player

No. 0 – Oklahoma State Cowboys
- Position: Wide receiver
- Class: Senior

Personal information
- Listed height: 6 ft 5 in (1.96 m)
- Listed weight: 209 lb (95 kg)

Career information
- High school: Pace Academy (Atlanta, Georgia)
- College: Eastern Illinois (2022–2023); Ball State (2024); Illinois (2025); Oklahoma State (2026–present)
- Stats at ESPN

Justin Bowick Jr. is an American college football wide receiver for the Oklahoma State Cowboys. He previously played for the Eastern Illinois Panthers, Ball State Cardinals and Illinois Fighting Illini.

== Early life ==
Bowick attended Pace Academy in Atlanta, Georgia. As a senior, he had 11 receptions for 131 yards and one touchdown. He committed to Eastern Illinois University to play college football.

== College career ==
Bowick played at Eastern Illinois in 2022 and 2023. Over the two seasons, he played in 19 games with 13 starts and had 48 receptions for 749 yards and eight touchdowns. After the 2023 season, he entered the transfer portal and committed to Ball State University. He missed the first six games due to injury his first year at Ball State in 2024 and returned to record 20 receptions for 383 yards and three touchdowns over four games he played. After the season, Bowick transferred to the University of Illinois Urbana-Champaign. In his lone season at Illinois, he played in all 12 games and had 22 receptions for 265 yards and five touchdowns. Bowick entered the transfer portal again after the season and committed to Oklahoma State University.
