= Bryson Tiller (basketball) =

American basketball player (born 2005)

No. 15 – Missouri Tigers
- Position: Power forward
- Conference: Southeastern Conference

Personal information
- Born: November 7, 2005 (age 21)
- Listed height: 6 ft 11 in (2.11 m)
- Listed weight: 245 lb (111 kg)

Career information
- High school: Pace Academy (Atlanta, Georgia)
- College: Kansas (2025–2026); Missouri (2026–present)

Career history
- 2022: Cold Hearts
- 2023–2024: City Reapers

Career highlights
- 2× OTE champion (2023, 2024); All-OTE Second team (2024)

Bryson Tiller is an American college basketball player for the Missouri Tigers of the Southeastern Conference (SEC). He previously played for the Kansas Jayhawks. He played high school basketball for Pace Academy in Atlanta, where he was rated a consensus five-star recruit and one of the top players in the 2025 recruiting class. Tiller joined Overtime Elite (OTE) after his freshman season at Pace, helping his team win back-to-back OTE league titles in 2023 and 2024 before committing to Kansas.

== Early life and high school career ==
Tiller attended Pace Academy in Atlanta during his freshman year, averaging 12.2 points, 7.7 rebounds, and 1.3 blocks per game. He earned class 2A honorable mention all-state honors from The Atlanta Journal-Constitution. Tiller also played for Atlanta Xpress in the Amateur Athletic Union (AAU) circuit at the under-17 level, starting in the summer after the eighth grade.

=== Recruiting ===
Tiller was considered a consensus four-star recruit. On November 16, 2024, he committed to playing college basketball for Kansas over offers from Auburn, Georgia Tech, and Indiana.

College recruiting
| Name | Hometown | School | Height | Weight | Commit date |
|---|---|---|---|---|---|
| Bryson Tiller; F | Atlanta, GA | Pace Academy (GA) | 6 ft 9 in (2.06 m) | N/A | Nov 16, 2024 |
| Bryson Tiller; F | Recruit ratings: Rivals: 247Sports: ESPN: (88) | | | | |
Overall recruit ranking: Rivals: 21 247Sports: 20 ESPN: 29
Note: In many cases, Scout, Rivals, 247Sports, On3, and ESPN may conflict in their listings of height and weight.; In these cases, the average was taken. ESPN grades are on a 100-point scale.; Sources: "Kansas 2025 Basketball Commitments". Rivals.; "2025 Team Ranking". Rivals.

== Professional career ==
On July 26, 2022, it was announced that Tiller had signed with Overtime Elite (OTE), a professional basketball league for late high school and early college-level players, ahead of its second season. He was the first high school sophomore to ever sign with OTE, becoming the league's youngest player, and waived his $100,000 guaranteed salary in order to maintain his future college eligibility. Tiller was drafted by the Overtime Cold Hearts after an impressive performance at the OTE Pro Day in October. He made his OTE debut for the Cold Hearts on November 5, recording 12 points and three rebounds in a 91–79 win over the Bruins. One week later, he recorded his first double-double with 11 points and 13 rebounds against the Holy Rams. Tiller was traded to the City Reapers midway through the season. He finished his rookie year in 2022–23 with averages of 11.5 points and 6.9 rebounds per game. Tiller helped the City Reapers win the league championship alongside Amen and Ausar Thompson, recording 15 points and eight rebounds in the team's title-clinching game 3 victory over the YNG Dreamerz in the OTE Finals.

In the 2023–24 OTE season, Tiller averaged 12.2 points, 9.4 rebounds, and 1.6 blocks per game, earning all-OTE second-team accolades and finishing top three in Defensive Player of the Year voting. He also helped the City Reapers to their second consecutive title.

== College career ==
As a freshman at Kansas, Tiller averaged 7.9 points, 6.1 rebounds and 1.3 blocks per game. Following the season he transferred to Missouri.

== Personal life ==
Tiller was born to former NFL and CFL player Tony Tiller and his wife Tiffany. He has two sisters.
