= Skyler Cassity =

American football coach

Current position
- Title: Defensive coordinator
- Team: Oklahoma State
- Conference: Big 12

Biographical details
- Education: Auburn (2016)

Coaching career (HC unless noted)
- 2014–2016: Auburn (SA)
- 2016: Texas State (GA)
- 2017–2019: Texas Tech (GA)
- 2020–2021: Missouri State (OLB/DB)
- 2022–2023: Abilene Christian (DC)
- 2024: Sam Houston (DC)
- 2025: North Texas (DC)
- 2026–present: Oklahoma State (DC)

Skyler Cassity is an American football coach who is currently the defensive coordinator for the Oklahoma State Cowboys.

== Coaching career ==
Cassity got his first coaching job in 2014 as a student assistant for Auburn. In 2016, he joined Texas State as a graduate assistant. After one season at Texas State, Cassity was hired as a graduate assistant at Texas Tech. In 2020, he was hired to coach the outside linebackers and defensive backs for Missouri State. Before the start of the 2022 season, he got his first defensive coordinator role at Abilene Christian. Ahead of the 2024 season, Cassity became the youngest defensive coordinator in the FBS after being hired by Sam Houston. After one season at Sam Houston, he joined North Texas as the team's defensive coordinator. After the conclusion of the 2025 season, Cassity was hired to be the defensive coordinator at Oklahoma State.

== Personal life ==
Cassity is the son of former coach and Oklahoma State defensive coordinator, Mike Cassity. He is also the brother of former Oklahoma State tight end, Braden Cassity.
