= Tyler Prochnow =

American sports agent

C. Tyler Prochnow (born 1966, Port Chester, New York) is an American businessman, lawyer and sports agent who was the founder, owner and first president of the Kansas City Brigade of the Arena Football League.

He is currently the CEO of Wootz Nano. He also currently serves as an adjunct professor at William Jewell College, where he teaches an upper-level course in sports business. Previously, he was a founding partner of Think Big Partners , a for-profit business incubator in Kansas City and co-founder of Think Big Kansas City . Think Big has partnered with Cisco, Sprint and the City of Kansas City to create the [Living Lab] for Kansas City's Smart & Connected City initiative . In 2011 Think Big Partners announced the first closing on their new venture capital fund, Think Big Ventures I and their first investment in EyeVerify .

Prior to launching the Brigade, Prochnow was the founder and president of Golden Peak Sports & Entertainment, a sports representation agency with clients including Deion Sanders, Neil Smith, and Olympians Amy Van Dyken and Aly Wagner. In 2004, at the request of one of their NFL clients, Prochnow began to explore the Arena Football League as an investment opportunity for others, and decided to pursue the acquisition of a franchise for Kansas City. While initially approved to launch the franchise in 2007, Prochnow's group's plans were accelerated to 2006 when Hurricane Katrina prevented the New Orleans VooDoo from playing during the 2006 AFL season. At the end of the 2006 season, Prochnow sold his stake in the team to local businessman Chris Likens who took over operations.

Prochnow graduated from Oglethorpe University in 1988 with a degree in political science and a minor in economics. After several years working in politics with a stint in the White House, he obtained his J.D. degree from the University of Denver College of Law in 1995. Prochnow worked as an attorney specializing in marketing and advertising law for eight years before starting Golden Peak. He has lectured on the topic of marketing and advertising law around the country and has been a legal commentator on various sports related issues for media outlets.
