= 2026 Texas Tech Red Raiders football team =

American college football season

2026 Texas Tech Red Raiders football
- Conference: Big 12 Conference

Ranking
- Coaches: No. 9
- AP: No. 9
- CFP: No. 12
- Record: 10–1 (7–1 Big 12)
- Head coach: Joey McGuire (5th season)
- Offensive coordinator: Mack Leftwich (2nd season)
- Offensive scheme: Run and gun
- Defensive coordinator: Shiel Wood (2nd season)
- Co-defensive coordinator: Rob Greene (1st season)
- Base defense: Multiple 3–4
- Home stadium: Galaxy Stadium

2026 Big 12 Conference football standings
	Conf.			Overall
Team	W		L	W		L
No. 2 Utah y	8	–	0	11	–	0
No. 12 Texas Tech	7	–	1	10	–	1
No. 10 BYU	6	–	2	9	–	2
No. 19 Arizona	5	–	3	8	–	3
No. 20 Houston	5	–	3	8	–	3
Oklahoma State	5	–	3	7	–	4
Baylor	4	–	4	6	–	5
Arizona State	4	–	4	6	–	5
UCF	4	–	4	6	–	5
Iowa State	3	–	5	5	–	6
TCU	3	–	5	5	–	6
Cincinnati	3	–	5	6	–	5
Kansas	2	–	6	4	–	7
West Virginia	2	–	6	5	–	6
Colorado	2	–	6	4	–	7
Kansas State	1	–	7	4	–	7
Championship: TBD vs. Utah
^ – College Football Playoff participant; $ – Conference champion; y – Championship game participant; As of November 22, 2026; Rankings from CFP rankings

The 2026 Texas Tech Red Raiders football team represents Texas Tech University during the 2026 NCAA Division I FBS football season as a member of the Big 12 Conference. The Red Raiders are led by fifth-year head coach Joey McGuire and play home games at Galaxy Stadium in Lubbock, Texas. The Red Raiders entered the 2026 season as the defending Big 12 champions.

== Offseason ==
=== Transfers ===
Incoming

Name	Pos.	Height	Weight	Hometown	Prev. school
Jalen Jones	WR	5'9	175 lbs	Birmingham, AL	Alabama State
Donte Lee	WR	6'3	180 lbs	Baltimore, MD	Liberty
Brendan Sorsby (Note: On April 27, 2026, it was announced that Sorsby was on indefinite leave to enter a gambling addiction treatment program.)	QB	6'3	205 lbs	Lake Dallas, TX	Cincinnati
Julien Laventure	DL	6'1	270 lbs	Upper Darby, PA	Akron
Bryce Butler	DL	6'5	295 lbs	Garden City, KS	Wake Forest
Davin Martin	CB	6'2	180 lbs	Houston, TX	UTSA
Trey White	EDGE	6'2	255 lbs	Chula Vista, CA	San Diego State
Jojo Johnson	DL	6'3	280 lbs	Salt Lake City, UT	Oregon State
Mateen Ibiroga	DL	6'4	290 lbs	Clarksburg, MD	Wake Forest
Adam Trick	EDGE	6'4	220 lbs	Dayton, OH	Maryland
Kenny Johnson	WR	6'1	187 lbs	Dallastown, PA	Pittsburgh
Jett Carpenter	TE	6'3	250 lbs	Medford, OR	Nevada
Jacob Hand	K	5'11	170 lbs	Mansfield, TX	Stephen F. Austin
Malcolm Simmons	WR	6'0	170 lbs	Alexander City, AL	Auburn
Corey Platt Jr.	LB	6'1	195 lbs	Little Rock, AR	Utah
Kirk Francis	QB	6'2	180 lbs	Tulsa, OK	Tulsa
Jordan Church	OL	6'5	300 lbs	Fort Myers, FL	Louisville
Jamond Mathis	EDGE	6'2	245 lbs	Saint Charles, MO	Kent State
Will Karoll	P	6'4	200 lbs	Sydney, NSW	UCLA
Austin Romaine	LB	6'2	235 lbs	Hillsboro, MO	Kansas State
Amarie Fleming	EDGE	6'2	220 lbs	Mayo, FL	Allen
Tommy Castellanos	QB	5'10	190 lbs	Waycross, GA	Florida State

Outgoing

Name	Pos.	Height	Weight	Hometown	New school
Tyson Turner	WR	6'2	215 lbs	Bryan, TX	Utah
Kasen Long	DL	6'5	270 lbs	Shallowater, TX	Utah State
Chapman Lewis	S	6'1	185 lbs	Burleson, TX	Utah State
Roy Alexander	WR	5'11	200 lbs	Fort Myers, FL	Incarnate Word
Cheta Ofili	EDGE	6'4	240 lbs	Sachse, TX	TCU
Eddy Smith	DL	6'6	275 lbs	Pearland, TX	UTSA
Deante Lindsay	CB	6'1	185 lbs	Ada, OK	Abilene Christian
Trey Jackson	TE	6'5	240 lbs	Dallas, TX	SMU
Braylon Rigsby	DL	6'2	275 lbs	Woodville, TX	Oklahoma State
Mitch Griffis	QB	6'0	195 lbs	Ashburn, VA	East Carolina
Mo Horn	CB	5'11	190 lbs	Broken Arrow, OK	Oklahoma State
Macho Stevenson	CB	6'1	190 lbs	Shreveport, LA	Tulane
T. J. West	WR	6'1	195 lbs	Humble, TX	UTSA
Preztynn Harrison	WR	6'5	210 lbs	Mineral Wells, TX	Howard Payne
Kelby Vaslin	WR	6'1	195 lbs	Arlington, TX	Florida Atlantic
Justin Horne	LB	6'1	200 lbs	New Orleans, LA	Alabama State
Dylan Spencer	EDGE	6'5	250 lbs	Houston, TX	UTSA
Price Morgan	WR	6'0	170 lbs	Pflugerville, TX	Incarnate Word
Upton Bellenfant	K	6'1	190 lbs	Smyrna, TN	South Carolina

=== Recruiting class ===
College recruiting
Name	Hometown	School	Height	Weight	Commit date
Ayden Johnson; Defensive line	Mount Pleasant, TX	Mount Pleasant High School	6 ft 0 in (1.83 m)	330 lb (150 kg)	Nov 30, 2024
Ayden Johnson; Defensive line	Recruit ratings: Rivals: 247Sports: ESPN:				
Luke Hamilton; Cornerback	New Braunfels, TX	Canyon High School	6 ft 1 in (1.85 m)	175 lb (79 kg)	Jan 18, 2025
Luke Hamilton; Cornerback	Recruit ratings: Rivals: 247Sports: ESPN:				
Krush Johnson; Defensive line	Amarillo, TX	Tascosa High School	6 ft 4 in (1.93 m)	275 lb (125 kg)	Jan 21, 2025
Krush Johnson; Defensive line	Recruit ratings: Rivals: 247Sports: ESPN:				
Maddox Quiller; Safety	Pflugerville, TX	Hendrickson High School	6 ft 1 in (1.85 m)	190 lb (86 kg)	Feb 12, 2025
Maddox Quiller; Safety	Recruit ratings: Rivals: 247Sports: ESPN:				
Cord Nolan; Linebacker	Bixby, OK	Bixby High School	6 ft 0 in (1.83 m)	190 lb (86 kg)	Mar 7, 2025
Cord Nolan; Linebacker	Recruit ratings: Rivals: 247Sports: ESPN:				
Noah Lewis; Cornerback	Terrell, TX	Terrell High School	5 ft 9 in (1.75 m)	176 lb (80 kg)	Mar 22, 2025
Noah Lewis; Cornerback	Recruit ratings: Rivals: 247Sports: ESPN:				
Jerald Mays; Offensive line	Pflugerville, TX	Weiss High School	6 ft 2 in (1.88 m)	280 lb (130 kg)	Apr 8, 2025
Jerald Mays; Offensive line	Recruit ratings: Rivals: 247Sports: ESPN:				
Stephen Cannon; Quarterback	Savannah, GA	Benedictine Military School	6 ft 2 in (1.88 m)	195 lb (88 kg)	Apr 8, 2025
Stephen Cannon; Quarterback	Recruit ratings: Rivals: 247Sports: ESPN:				
Aaron Bradshaw; Safety	Fort Worth, TX	North Crowley High School	6 ft 2 in (1.88 m)	185 lb (84 kg)	Apr 18, 2025
Aaron Bradshaw; Safety	Recruit ratings: Rivals: 247Sports: ESPN:				
Jacob Crow; Offensive line	Alcoa, TN	Alcoa High School	6 ft 8 in (2.03 m)	305 lb (138 kg)	Jun 8, 2025
Jacob Crow; Offensive line	Recruit ratings: Rivals: 247Sports: ESPN:				
Demarcus Marks; EDGE	Houston, TX	Westfield High School	6 ft 3 in (1.91 m)	210 lb (95 kg)	Jun 8, 2025
Demarcus Marks; EDGE	Recruit ratings: Rivals: 247Sports: ESPN:				
Kaegan Ash; Linebacker	Mount Enterprise, TX	Mount Enterprise High School	5 ft 1 in (1.55 m)	205 lb (93 kg)	Jun 15, 2025
Kaegan Ash; Linebacker	Recruit ratings: Rivals: 247Sports: ESPN:				
Imari Jehiel; Wide receiver	Dallas, TX	Forney High School	6 ft 0 in (1.83 m)	170 lb (77 kg)	Jun 16, 2025
Imari Jehiel; Wide receiver	Recruit ratings: Rivals: 247Sports: ESPN:				
S'Vioarean Martin; Cornerback	Palestine, TX	Palestine High School	6 ft 2 in (1.88 m)	200 lb (91 kg)	Jun 19, 2025
S'Vioarean Martin; Cornerback	Recruit ratings: Rivals: 247Sports: ESPN:				
Donovan Webb; Safety	Frisco, TX	Panther Creek High School	6 ft 0 in (1.83 m)	188 lb (85 kg)	Jul 2, 2025
Donovan Webb; Safety	Recruit ratings: Rivals: 247Sports: ESPN:				
Ace Rowden; Running back	New Boston, TX	New Boston High School	6 ft 0 in (1.83 m)	192 lb (87 kg)	Jul 3, 2025
Ace Rowden; Running back	Recruit ratings: Rivals: 247Sports: ESPN:				
Felix Ojo; Offensive line	Mansfield, TX	Lake Ridge High School	6 ft 7 in (2.01 m)	275 lb (125 kg)	Jul 4, 2025
Felix Ojo; Offensive line	Recruit ratings: Rivals: 247Sports: ESPN:				
Chase Campbell; Wide receiver	Wolfforth, TX	Frenship High School	6 ft 1 in (1.85 m)	195 lb (88 kg)	Jul 22, 2025
Chase Campbell; Wide receiver	Recruit ratings: Rivals: 247Sports: ESPN:				
LaDamion Guyton; EDGE	Savannah, GA	Benedictine Military School	6 ft 3 in (1.91 m)	240 lb (110 kg)	Aug 7, 2025
LaDamion Guyton; EDGE	Recruit ratings: Rivals: 247Sports: ESPN:				
Bryce Gilmore; Offensive line	Prosper, TX	Prosper High School	6 ft 4 in (1.93 m)	270 lb (120 kg)	Sep 14, 2025
Bryce Gilmore; Offensive line	Recruit ratings: Rivals: 247Sports: ESPN:				
Matt Ludwig; Tight end	Billings, MT	Billings West High School	6 ft 5 in (1.96 m)	240 lb (110 kg)	Dec 12, 2025
Matt Ludwig; Tight end	Recruit ratings: Rivals: 247Sports: ESPN:				
Reed Price; Long snapper	Gilbert, AZ	Highland High School	6 ft 5 in (1.96 m)	210 lb (95 kg)	Dec 13, 2025
Reed Price; Long snapper	Recruit ratings: Rivals: 247Sports: ESPN:				

== Schedule ==
Date	Time	Opponent	Rank	Site	TV	Result	Attendance
September 5	6:00 p.m.	No. 20 (FCS) Abilene Christian*	No. 12	Galaxy Stadium; Lubbock, TX	FS1	W 33–10	60,229
September 12	6:30 p.m.	at Oregon State*	No. 13	Reser Stadium; Corvallis, OR	CBS	W 35–24	30,539
September 18	7:00 p.m.	No. 22 Houston	No. 13	Galaxy Stadium; Lubbock, TX (rivalry)	Fox	W 28–26	60,229
September 26	11:00 a.m.	Sam Houston*	No. 11	Galaxy Stadium; Lubbock, TX	TNT/TruTV	W 49–14	59,704
October 3	6:30 p.m.	at Colorado	No. 12	Folsom Field; Boulder, CO	Fox	W 29–7	50,106
October 17	2:30 p.m.	Arizona State^{†}	No. 10	Galaxy Stadium; Lubbock, TX	Fox	W 53–25	60,229
October 24	11:00 a.m.	at Cincinnati	No. 8	Nippert Stadium; Cincinnati, OH	FS1	L 24–37	38,088
October 31	11:00 a.m.	No. 22 Arizona	No. 13	Galaxy Stadium; Lubbock, TX	ESPN	W 34–26	59,131
November 7	8:30 p.m.	West Virginia	No. 15	Galaxy Stadium; Lubbock, TX	ESPN	W 53–48	60,229
November 14	8:30 p.m.	at No. 25 Oklahoma State	No. 12	Boone Pickens Stadium; Stillwater, OK	ESPN	W 52–27	52,168
November 21	2:30 p.m.	at Baylor	No. 12	McLane Stadium; Waco, TX (rivalry)	Fox	W 20–10	46,765
November 26	7:00 p.m.	TCU		Galaxy Stadium; Lubbock, TX (rivalry)	ESPN		
*Non-conference game; ^{†}Homecoming; Rankings from AP Poll (and CFP Rankings, after November 3) - Released prior to game; All times are in Central time

== Rankings ==
Ranking movements Legend: ██ Increase in ranking ██ Decrease in ranking
	Week															
Poll	Pre	1	2	3	4	5	6	7	8	9	10	11	12	13	14	Final
AP	12	13	13	11	12	11	10	8	13	13	10	11	9			
Coaches	12	13	12	10	10	9	9	5	14	13	10	11	9			
CFP	Not released									15	12	12				Not released

== Personnel ==
2026 Texas Tech Red Raiders football team roster
Players
Coaches
Offense

Pos.	#	Name	Class
RB	0	Quinten Joyner	Sr
WR	1	Micah Hudson	Jr
WR	2	Kenny Johnson	Sr
WR	3	Coy Eakin	GS
QB	4	Tommy Castellanos	GS
TE	5	Matt Ludwig	Fr
WR	6	Jalen Jones	Sr
TE	7	Terrance Carter Jr.	GS
RB	8	Cameron Dickey	Jr
WR	9	Donte Lee Jr.	GS
QB	10	Lloyd Jones III	So
WR	11	Malcolm Simmons	Jr
QB	12	Stephen Cannon	Fr
WR	13	Chase Campbell	Fr
WR	14	Bryson Jones	So
QB	15	Will Hammond	Jr
QB	16	Holden Phillips	So
WR	17	Leyton Stone	So
QB	18	Kirk Francis	Sr
WR	19	Michael Dever	So
RB	20	J'Koby Williams	Jr
WR	21	Tristian Gentry	So
RB	28	Ashton Rowden	Fr
RB	32	Sawyer Wilkerson	So
RB	33	Loic Tshibangu	Sr
RB	35	Michael Henderson III	So
OL	50	Patrick McMath	So
OL	51	Felix Ojo	Fr
OL	52	Cash Cleveland	Jr
OL	53	Holton Hendrix	Jr
OL	54	Jordan Church	Sr
OL	56	Jerald Mays	Fr
OL	57	Hunter Zambrano	GS
OL	61	Connor Carty	So
OL	65	D'Anthis Upshaw Jr.	Jr
OL	66	Jackson Hildebrand	Jr
OL	68	Ren Brown	Jr
OL	70	Jacob Ponton	Jr
OL	71	Bryce Gilmore	Fr
OL	72	Sheridan Wilson	GS
OL	73	Danilo Guberinich	So
OL	74	Daniel Sill	Sr
OL	75	Garin Maley	So
OL	76	Jacob Crow	Fr
OL	78	Elias Davis	Jr
OL	79	Howard Sampson	GS
WR	80	Kai Powell	Sr
TE	83	Jack Esparaza	GS
WR	84	Imari Jehiel	Fr
TE	85	Jett Carpenter	GS
WR	88	Quintaelyn Joyner	So
TE	89	Jason Llewellyn	GS

Defense

Pos.	#	Name	Class
S	0	Mikal Harrison-Pilot	Jr
DL	1	Julien Laventure	GS
OLB	2	Trey White	GS
S	3	Peyton Morgan	Jr
CB	4	Davin Martin	Sr
S	5	Oliver Miles III	Jr
LB	6	John Curry	Sr
S	7	Brendan Jordan	Sr
OLB	8	Jamond Mathis	Sr
LB	9	Corey Platt Jr.	GS
DL	10	A. J. Holmes Jr.	GS
LB	11	Brock Golwas	So
CB	12	Tarrion Grant	Jr
LB	13	Ben Roberts	GS
CB	14	Brice Pollock	Sr
LB	15	Austin Romaine	Sr
CB	16	Ashton Hampton	Jr
CB	17	Noah Lewis	Fr
CB	18	S'Vioarean Martin	Fr
CB	19	Cam Wyatt	Fr
OLB	20	Adam Trick	GS
S	21	Miquel Dingle Jr.	Sr
S	22	Marcus Ramon-Edwards	Sr
S	23	Maddox Quiller	Fr
S	24	Malik Esquerra	Jr
S	25	Donovan Webb	Fr
S	26	Aaron Bradshaw	Fr
CB	27	Amier Boyd	GS
S	28	Braylan McDonald	So
S	28	Jordan Rogers	GS
CB	29	Luke Hamilton	Fr
S	30	Jamarn Grant II	Jr
LB	31	Cord Nolan	Fr
OLB	32	LaDaminion Guyton	Fr
OLB	33	Ansel Nedore	Sr
LB	34	Kaegan Ash	Fr
LB	35	Adam Hill	Jr
OLB	36	Demarcus Marks	Fr
LB	40	Wesley Smith	Sr
LB	43	Chris Lemons	Sr
LB	45	Brock Golwas	So
DL	51	Jayden Cofield	Sr
OLB	56	Amarie Fleming	Jr
OLB	86	Sean Robinson	So
DL	90	Ayden Johnson	Fr
DL	91	Krush Johnson	Fr
DL	92	Bryce Butler	GS
DL	93	Dylan Singleton	So
OLB	95	Christian Bruce	Fr
DL	96	Keyshawn Williams	Jr
OLB	97	Charles Anderson Jr.	Jr
DL	98	Mateen Ibirogba	GS
DL, OLB	99	Jojo Johnson	Sr

Special teams

Pos.	#	Name	Class
P, K	37	Ian Hershey	GS
K	39	Jacob Hand	Sr
LS	47	Rylan Vagana	Jr
K	48	Stone Harrington	GS
P	49	Will Karoll	Sr

Head coach

- Joey McGuire

Coordinators/assistant coaches

- Kenny Perry
  Associate head coach/special teams coordinator
- Justin Johnson
  Assistant head coach/passing game coordinator/wide receivers
- Mack Leftwich
  Offensive coordinator/quarterbacks
- Shiel Wood
  Defensive coordinator/inside linebackers
- Rob Greene
  Co-defensive coordinator/safeties
- Imarjaye Albury Sr.
  Defensive line
- Josh Cochran
  Run game coordinator/tight ends
- Darcel McBath
  Cornerbacks
- Clay McGuire
  Offensive line
- Garret McGuire
  Running backs
- Jacquies Smith
  Outside linebackers
- Jack Teachey
  Senior defensive analyst
- Mac Alexander
  Assistant special teams coordinator
- Jah'Shawn Johnson
  Assistant defensive backs
- Lindsey Scott Jr.
  Assistant quarterbacks
- Taylor Young
  Assistant inside linebackers

Legend

- (C) Team captain
- (S) Suspended
- (I) Ineligible
- Injured
- Redshirt

Roster
Last update: October 19, 2026

== Game summaries ==
=== No. 20 (FCS) Abilene Christian ===
No. 20 (FCS) Abilene Christian Wildcats (0–1) at No. 12 Texas Tech Red Raiders (0–0) – Game summary

Quarter	1	2	3	4	Total
No. 20 (FCS) Wildcats	0	3	0	7	10
No. 12 Red Raiders	14	3	9	7	33

at Galaxy Stadium, Lubbock, Texas

- Date: September 5
- Game time: 6:00 p.m. CDT
- Game weather: Sunny • Temperature: 97 °F (36 °C) • Wind: SE 9 mph
- Game attendance: 60,229
- Referee: Kevin Randall
- TV announcers (FS1): Dan Hellie and Robert Smith
- References: Box score, Recap

Game information
First quarter
- TTU – Quinten Joyner 14-yard run (Stone Harrington kick), 12:14. Red Raiders 7–0. Drive: 7 plays, 75 yards, 2:46.
- TTU – J'Koby Williams 5-yard run (Stone Harrington kick), 2:22. Red Raiders 14–0. Drive: 15 plays, 87 yards, 7:17.

Second quarter

- TTU – Stone Harrington 23-yard field goal, 1:38. Red Raiders 17–0. Drive: 7 plays, 45 yards, 1:45.
- ACU – Brandon Perez 41-yard field goal, 0:07. Red Raiders 17–3. Drive: 11 plays, 51 yards, 1:31.

Third quarter

- TTU – Stone Harrington 28-yard field goal, 13:03. Red Raiders 20–3. Drive: 4 plays, 3 yards, 1:50.
- TTU – Stone Harrington 33-yard field goal, 7:36. Red Raiders 23–3. Drive: 10 plays, 52 yards, 3:19.
- TTU – Stone Harrington 45-yard field goal, 1:52. Red Raiders 26–3. Drive: 8 plays, 40 yards, 3:22.

Fourth quarter

- TTU – Malcolm Simmons 64-yard pass from Will Hammond (Stone Harrington kick), 2:45. Red Raiders 33–3. Drive: 9 plays, 91 yards, 3:49.
- ACU – Alex Broome 98-yard kickoff return (Brandon Perez kick), 2:29. Red Raiders 33–10.

Statistics	ACU	TTU
First downs	15	26
Total yards	194	471
Rushing yards	75	173
Passing yards	119	298
Turnovers	1	1
Time of possession	27:48	32:12

Team	Category	Player	Statistics
Abilene Christian	Passing	John David Black	18/32, 119 yards, INT
Abilene Christian	Rushing	Alex Broome	10 rushes, 52 yards
Abilene Christian	Receiving	Cristian Driver	8 receptions, 93 yards
Texas Tech	Passing	Will Hammond	26/33, 298 yards, TD, INT
Texas Tech	Rushing	J'Koby Williams	13 rushes, 71 yards, TD
Texas Tech	Receiving	Kenny Johnson	4 receptions, 76 yards

=== At Oregon State ===
No. 13 Texas Tech Red Raiders (1–0) at Oregon State Beavers (0–1) – Game summary

Quarter	1	2	3	4	Total
No. 13 Red Raiders	0	14	7	14	35
Beavers	0	7	14	3	24

at Reser Stadium, Corvallis, Oregon

- Date: September 12
- Game time: 6:30 p.m. CDT / 4:30 p.m. PDT
- Game weather: Cloudy • Temperature: 64 °F (18 °C) • Wind: SW 8 mph
- Game attendance: 30,539
- Referee: Kevin Boitmann
- TV announcers (CBS): Rich Waltz, Adam Breneman, Brian Kelly, and Jordan Giorgio
- References: Box score, Recap

Game information
First quarter
- No scoring plays

Second quarter

- TTU – Tommy Castellanos 7-yard run (Stone Harrington kick), 7:35. Red Raiders 7–0. Drive: 6 plays, 41 yards, 1:55.
- ORST – Jesse Legree 75-yard pass from Braden Atkinson (Caleb Ojeda kick), 7:25. Tied 7–7. Drive: 1 play, 75 yards, 0:10.
- TTU – Cameron Dickey 1-yard run (Stone Harrington kick), 3:01. Red Raiders 14–7. Drive: 11 plays, 73 yards, 4:18.

Third quarter

- ORST – Braden Atkinson 4-yard pass from A. J. Newberry (run failed), 11:22. Red Raiders 14–13. Drive: 6 plays, 76 yards, 2:47.
- TTU – J'Koby Williams 38-yard run (Stone Harrington kick), 8:05. Red Raiders 21–13. Drive: 8 plays, 75 yards, 3:12.
- ORST – Jesse Legree 37-yard pass from Braden Atkinson (Braden Atkinson run), 4:55. Tied 21–21. Drive: 8 plays, 75 yards, 3:10.

Fourth quarter

- ORST – Caleb Ojeda 34-yard field goal, 13:23. Beavers 24–21. Drive: 4 plays, 6 yards, 1:37.
- TTU – Coy Eakin 32-yard pass from Will Hammond (Stone Harrington kick), 6:37. Red Raiders 28–24. Drive: 6 plays, 62 yards, 2:54.
- TTU – Matt Ludwig 8-yard pass from Tommy Castellanos (Stone Harrington kick), 1:03. Red Raiders 35–24. Drive: 3 plays, 11 yards, 0:16.

Statistics	TTU	ORST
First downs	22	20
Total yards	352	472
Rushing yards	155	69
Passing yards	197	403
Turnovers	1	1
Time of possession	29:35	30:14

Team	Category	Player	Statistics
Texas Tech	Passing	Will Hammond	20/27, 189 yards, TD
Texas Tech	Rushing	J'Koby Williams	20 rushes, 116 yards, TD
Texas Tech	Receiving	Coy Eakin	6 receptions, 79 yards, TD
Oregon State	Passing	Braden Atkinson	29/49, 399 yards, 2 TD, INT
Oregon State	Rushing	Aaron Butler	3 rushes, 34 yards
Oregon State	Receiving	Jesse Legree	8 receptions, 240 yards, 2 TD

=== No. 22 Houston ===
No. 22 Houston Cougars (2–0) at No. 13 Texas Tech Red Raiders (2–0) – Game summary

Quarter	1	2	3	4	Total
No. 22 Cougars	10	7	3	6	26
No. 13 Red Raiders	0	14	7	7	28

at Galaxy Stadium, Lubbock, Texas

- Date: September 18
- Game time: 7:00 p.m. CDT
- Game weather: Sunny • Temperature: 89 °F (32 °C) • Wind: S 10 mph
- Game attendance: 60,229
- Referee: Michael VanderVelde
- TV announcers (Fox): Tim Brando, Devin Gardner, and Josh Sims
- Box score, Recap

Game information
First quarter
- HOU – Jonathan Dimas 31-yard field goal, 9:27. Cougars 3–0. Drive: 13 plays, 62 yards, 5:33.
- HOU – Amare Thomas 11-yard pass from Conner Weigman (Jonathan Dimas kick), 3:49. Cougars 10–0. Drive: 10 plays, 55 yards, 5:45.

Second quarter

- TTU – Kenny Johnson 35-yard pass from Will Hammond (Stone Harrington kick), 14:08. Cougars 10–7. Drive: 7 plays, 75 yards, 2:14.
- TTU – Tommy Castellanos 3-yard run (Stone Harrington kick), 3:39. Red Raiders 14–10. Drive: 5 plays, 80 yards, 2:28.
- HOU – Koby Young 46-yard pass from Conner Weigman (Jonathan Dimas kick), 1:11. Cougars 17–14. Drive: 6 plays, 75 yards, 2:28.

Third quarter

- TTU – J'Koby Williams 29-yard run (Stone Harrington kick), 12:41. Red Raiders 21–17. Drive: 5 plays, 75 yards, 2:19.
- HOU – Jonathan Dimas 28-yard field goal, 5:31. Red Raiders 21–20. Drive: 13 plays, 71 yards, 7:04.

Fourth quarter

- TTU – Cameron Dickey 1-yard run (Stone Harrington kick), 7:36. Red Raiders 28–20. Drive: 11 plays, 87 yards, 6:03.
- HOU – Patrick Overmyer 10-yard pass from Conner Weigman (run failed), 0:49. Red Raiders 28–26. Drive: 10 plays, 78 yards, 1:55.

Statistics	HOU	TTU
First downs	27	22
Total yards	458	425
Rushing yards	176	168
Passing yards	282	257
Turnovers	1	2
Time of possession	33:42	26:18

Team	Category	Player	Statistics
Houston	Passing	Conner Weigman	27/38, 282 yards, 3 TD
Houston	Rushing	Makhi Hughes	15 rushes, 71 yards
Houston	Receiving	Amare Thomas	7 receptions, 75 yards, TD
Texas Tech	Passing	Will Hammond	17/27, 257 yards, TD, INT
Texas Tech	Rushing	Cameron Dickey	16 rushes, 65 yards, TD
Texas Tech	Receiving	Kenny Johnson	4 receptions, 113 yards, TD

=== Sam Houston ===
Sam Houston Bearkats (1–2) at No. 11 Texas Tech Red Raiders (3–0) – Game summary

Quarter	1	2	3	4	Total
Bearkats	0	14	0	0	14
No. 11 Red Raiders	7	14	14	14	49

at Galaxy Stadium, Lubbock, Texas

- Date: September 26
- Game time: 11:00 a.m. CDT
- Game weather: Sunny • Temperature: 78 °F (26 °C) • Wind: SW 10 mph
- Game attendance: 59,704
- Referee: Cravonne Barrett
- TV announcers (TNT/TruTV/HBO Max): J. B. Long, Mike Golic Jr., and Allie LaForce
- Box score, Recap

Game information
First quarter
- TTU – Cameron Dickey 1-yard run (Stone Harrington kick), 5:11. Red Raiders 7–0. Drive: 8 plays, 70 yards, 3:16.

Second quarter

- TTU – Austin Romaine 15-yard interception return (Stone Harrington kick), 14:54. Red Raiders 14–0.
- TTU – Austin Romaine 31-yard interception return (Stone Harrington kick), 14:52. Red Raiders 21–0.
- SHSU – Tim Burns Jr. 52-yard pass from Landyn Locke (Sam Carpenter kick), 8:17. Red Raiders 21–7. Drive: 2 plays, 64 yards, 1:47.
- SHSU – Chris Reed 9-yard pass from Landyn Locke (Sam Carpenter kick), 1:56. Red Raiders 21–14. Drive: 2 plays, 4 yards, 0:25.

Third quarter

- TTU – Cameron Dickey 13-yard run (Stone Harrington kick), 13:42. Red Raiders 28–14. Drive: 3 plays, 32 yards, 1:08.
- TTU – Coy Eakin 21-yard pass from Will Hammond (Stone Harrington kick), 10:33. Red Raiders 35–14. Drive: 5 plays, 53 yards, 1:41.

Fourth quarter

- TTU – Will Hammond 23-yard run (Stone Harrington kick), 10:41. Red Raiders 42–14. Drive: 7 plays, 80 yards, 1:56.
- TTU – Malcolm Simmons 27-yard pass from Tommy Castellanos (Stone Harrington kick), 4:49. Red Raiders 49–14. Drive: 9 plays, 36 yards, 3:21.

Statistics	SHSU	TTU
First downs	11	24
Total yards	269	470
Rushing yards	74	219
Passing yards	195	251
Turnovers	3	4
Time of possession	35:06	24:54

Team	Category	Player	Statistics
Sam Houston	Passing	Landyn Locke	23/37, 195 yards, 2 TD, 2 INT
Sam Houston	Rushing	Alton McCaskill	8 rushes, 25 yards
Sam Houston	Receiving	Tim Burns Jr.	2 receptions, 61 yards, TD
Texas Tech	Passing	Will Hammond	17/29, 224 yards, TD, 3 INT
Texas Tech	Rushing	Cameron Dickey	12 rushes, 91 yards, 2 TD
Texas Tech	Receiving	Kenny Johnson	3 receptions, 60 yards

=== At Colorado ===
No. 12 Texas Tech Red Raiders (4–0) at Colorado Buffaloes (2–2) – Game summary

Quarter	1	2	3	4	Total
No. 12 Red Raiders	3	0	9	17	29
Buffaloes	7	0	0	0	7

at Folsom Field, Boulder, Colorado

- Date: October 3
- Game time: 6:30 p.m. CDT / 5:30 p.m. MDT
- Game weather: Clear • Temperature: 81 °F (27 °C) • Wind: NE 14 mph
- Game attendance: 50,106
- Referee: Michael McCabe
- TV announcers (Fox): Noah Reed, Devin Gardner, and Josh Sims
- Box score, Recap

Game information
First quarter
- COLO – Joseph Williams 8-yard pass from Isaac Wilson (Elliott Arnold kick), 10:29. Buffaloes 7–0. Drive: 9 plays, 75 yards, 4:31.
- TTU – Stone Harrington 52-yard field goal, 7:05. Buffaloes 7–3. Drive: 10 plays, 42 yards, 3:24.

Second quarter

- No scoring plays

Third quarter

- TTU – Stone Harrington 27-yard field goal, 9:09. Buffaloes 7–6. Drive: 6 plays, 21 yards, 2:21.
- TTU – Terrance Carter Jr. 11-yard pass from Will Hammond (pass failed), 3:01. Red Raiders 12–7. Drive: 7 plays, 79 yards, 3:42.

Fourth quarter

- TTU – Stone Harrington 46-yard field goal, 12:03. Red Raiders 15–7. Drive: 5 plays, 8 yards, 3:30.
- TTU – John Curry interception in the end zone (Stone Harrington kick), 7:10. Red Raiders 22–7.
- TTU – Quinten Joyner 30-yard run (Stone Harrington kick), 3:06. Red Raiders 29–7. Drive: 3 plays, 41 yards, 1:40.

Statistics	TTU	COLO
First downs	19	22
Total yards	315	375
Rushing yards	181	78
Passing yards	134	297
Turnovers	0	4
Time of possession	28:56	31:04

Team	Category	Player	Statistics
Texas Tech	Passing	Will Hammond	17/26, 134 yards, TD
Texas Tech	Rushing	J'Koby Williams	17 rushes, 88 yards
Texas Tech	Receiving	Terrance Carter Jr.	8 receptions, 67 yards, TD
Colorado	Passing	Isaac Wilson	26/44, 290 yards, TD, 3 INT
Colorado	Rushing	Isaac Wilson	17 rushes, 42 yards
Colorado	Receiving	Joseph Williams	10 receptions, 93 yards, TD

=== Arizona State ===
Arizona State Sun Devils (3–2) at No. 10 Texas Tech Red Raiders (5–0) – Game summary

Quarter	1	2	3	4	Total
Sun Devils	7	3	7	8	25
No. 10 Red Raiders	21	22	0	10	53

at Galaxy Stadium, Lubbock, Texas

- Date: October 17
- Game time: 2:30 p.m. CDT
- Game weather: Sunny • Temperature: 58 °F (14 °C) • Wind: NW 5 mph
- Game attendance: 60,229
- Referee: Kevin Mar
- TV announcers (Fox): Connor Onion, Robert Griffin III, and Alexa Landestoy
- Box score, Recap

Game information
First quarter
- TTU – Ben Roberts 24-yard interception return (Stone Harrington kick), 7:48. Red Raiders 7–0.
- TTU – Will Hammond 9-yard run (Stone Harrington kick), 5:12. Red Raiders 14–0. Drive: 2 plays, 33 yards, 0:26.
- TTU – J'Koby Williams 62-yard run (Stone Harrington kick), 3:17. Red Raiders 21–0. Drive: 1 play, 62 yards, 0:10.
- ASU – Raiden Vines-Bright 74-yard pass from Cutter Boley (Carson Smith kick), 2:27. Red Raiders 21–7. Drive: 2 plays, 75 yards, 0:50.

Second quarter

- TTU – Stone Harrington 31-yard field goal, 12:43. Red Raiders 24–7. Drive: 12 plays, 60 yards, 4:39.
- ASU – Carson Smith 30-yard field goal, 8:24. Red Raiders 24–10. Drive: 9 plays, 62 yards, 4:19.
- TTU – Stone Harrington 42-yard field goal, 6:25. Red Raiders 27–10. Drive: 5 plays, 51 yards, 1:59.
- TTU – J'Koby Williams 38-yard run (kick blocked), 4:08. Red Raiders 33–10. Drive: 3 plays, 67 yards, 0:56.
- TTU – Coy Eakin 11-yard pass from Will Hammond (Stone Harrington kick), 0:31. Red Raiders 40–10. Drive: 6 plays, 39 yards, 1:26.
- TTU – Stone Harrington 37-yard field goal, 0:00. Red Raiders 43–10. Drive: 3 plays, 9 yards, 0:16.

Third quarter

- ASU – Reed Harris 2-yard pass from Mikey Keene (Carson Smith kick), 9:34. Red Raiders 43–17. Drive: 11 plays, 75 yards, 5:26.

Fourth quarter

- TTU – Stone Harrington 34-yard field goal, 14:57. Red Raiders 46–17. Drive: 8 plays, 38 yards, 3:20.
- TTU – Terrance Carter Jr. 1-yard run (Stone Harrington kick), 9:28. Red Raiders 53–17. Drive: 4 plays, 25 yards, 1:59.
- ASU – Cardae Mack 12-yard pass from Mikey Keene (Mikey Keene pass to Kyson Brown), 6:32. Red Raiders 53–25. Drive: 11 plays, 75 yards, 2:56.

Statistics	ASU	TTU
First downs	21	21
Total yards	415	502
Rushing yards	35	260
Passing yards	380	242
Turnovers	2	1
Time of possession	32:33	27:27

Team	Category	Player	Statistics
Arizona State	Passing	Mikey Keene	25/34, 256 yards, 2 TD
Arizona State	Rushing	Kyson Brown	5 rushes, 39 yards
Arizona State	Receiving	Derek Eusebio	7 receptions, 89 yards
Texas Tech	Passing	Will Hammond	18/26, 232 yards, TD
Texas Tech	Rushing	J'Koby Williams	11 rushes, 165 yards, 2 TD
Texas Tech	Receiving	Kenny Johnson	7 receptions, 120 yards

=== At Cincinnati ===
No. 8 Texas Tech Red Raiders (6–0) at Cincinnati Bearcats (4–2) – Game summary

Quarter	1	2	3	4	Total
No. 8 Red Raiders	6	0	9	9	24
Bearcats	3	21	7	6	37

at Nippert Stadium, Cincinnati, Ohio

- Date: October 24
- Game time: 11:00 a.m. CDT / 12:00 p.m. EDT
- Game weather: Sunny • Temperature: 58 °F (14 °C) • Wind: E 2 mph
- Game attendance: 38,088
- Referee: Michael VanderVelde
- TV announcers (FS1): Jack Kizer and Mark Helfrich
- Box score, Recap

Game information
First quarter
- CIN – Stephen Rusnak 47-yard field goal, 11:22. Bearcats 3–0. Drive: 5 plays, 18 yards, 1:19.
- TTU – Stone Harrington 32-yard field goal, 6:11. Tied 3–3. Drive: 12 plays, 44 yards, 5:01.
- TTU – Stone Harrington 48-yard field goal, 0:58. Red Raiders 6–3. Drive: 10 plays, 60 yards, 4:03.

Second quarter

- CIN – Cole Tabb 4-yard pass from JC French (Stephen Rusnak kick), 7:48. Bearcats 10–6. Drive: 10 plays, 85 yards, 5:00.
- CIN – Malachi Henry 5-yard pass from JC French (Stephen Rusnak kick), 1:37. Bearcats 17–6. Drive: 11 plays, 55 yards, 4:11.
- CIN – Lyviel Waters 2-yard pass from JC French (Stephen Rusnak kick), 0:05. Bearcats 24–6. Drive: 5 plays, 75 yards, 0:26.

Third quarter

- TTU – Stone Harrington 42-yard field goal, 11:07. Bearcats 24–9. Drive: 11 plays, 54 yards, 3:49.
- TTU – Peyton Morgan 53-yard interception return (pass failed), 8:49. Bearcats 24–15.
- CIN – Larenzo Fenner 17-yard pass from JC French (Stephen Rusnak kick), 0:50. Bearcats 31–15. Drive: 10 plays, 81 yards, 4:17.

Fourth quarter

- TTU – Stone Harrington 33-yard field goal, 7:42. Bearcats 31–18. Drive: 11 plays, 72 yards, 4:54.
- CIN – Cole Tabb 58-yard run (pass failed), 6:06. Bearcats 37–18. Drive: 3 plays, 75 yards, 1:36.
- TTU – Quinten Joyner 3-yard run (pass failed), 0:59. Bearcats 37–24. Drive: 7 plays, 64 yards, 1:23.

Statistics	TTU	CIN
First downs	22	21
Total yards	400	427
Rushing yards	173	255
Passing yards	227	172
Turnovers	3	2
Time of possession	30:43	29:17

Team	Category	Player	Statistics
Texas Tech	Passing	Will Hammond	24/37, 227 yards, INT
Texas Tech	Rushing	J'Koby Williams	12 rushes, 81 yards
Texas Tech	Receiving	Kenny Johnson	7 receptions, 81 yards
Cincinnati	Passing	JC French	19/30, 172 yards, 4 TD, 2 INT
Cincinnati	Rushing	Cole Tabb	16 rushes, 173 yards, TD
Cincinnati	Receiving	Zylan Perry	4 receptions, 43 yards

=== No. 22 Arizona ===
No. 22 Arizona Wildcats (6–1) at No. 13 Texas Tech Red Raiders (6–1) – Game summary

Quarter	1	2	3	4	Total
No. 22 Wildcats	3	14	6	3	26
No. 13 Red Raiders	7	3	14	10	34

at Galaxy Stadium, Lubbock, Texas

- Date: October 31
- Game time: 11:00 a.m. CDT
- Game weather: Cloudy • Temperature: 55 °F (13 °C) • Wind: SW 5 mph
- Game attendance: 59,131
- Referee: Tutashinda Salaam
- TV announcers (ESPN): Dave Pasch, Dusty Dvoracek, and Taylor McGregor
- Box score, Recap

Game information
First quarter
- ARIZ – Michael Salgado-Medina 35-yard field goal, 11:35. Wildcats 3–0. Drive: 7 plays, 57 yards, 3:25.
- TTU – Terrance Carter Jr. 24-yard pass from Tommy Castellanos (Stone Harrington kick), 7:03. Red Raiders 7–3. Drive: 13 plays, 75 yards, 4:32.

Second quarter

- ARIZ – Isaiah Mizell 94-yard pass from Noah Fifita (Michael Salgado-Medina kick), 10:02. Wildcats 10–7. Drive: 3 plays, 92 yards, 1:27.
- ARIZ – Kedrick Reescano 5-yard run (Michael Salgado-Medina kick), 1:56. Wildcats 17–7. Drive: 14 plays, 89 yards, 7:07.
- TTU – Stone Harrington 29-yard field goal, 0:24. Wildcats 17–10. Drive: 9 plays, 64 yards, 1:32.

Third quarter

- TTU – Tommy Castellanos 8-yard run (Stone Harrington kick), 10:02. Tied 17–17. Drive: 12 plays, 75 yards, 4:58.
- ARIZ – Kedrick Reescano 1-yard run (kick blocked), 5:34. Wildcats 23–17. Drive: 10 plays, 75 yards, 4:28.
- TTU – Kenny Johnson 27-yard pass from Tommy Castellanos (Stone Harrington kick), 2:33. Red Raiders 24–23. Drive: 7 plays, 75 yards, 3:01.

Fourth quarter

- TTU – Stone Harrington 42-yard field goal, 14:43. Red Raiders 27–23. Drive: 5 plays, 27 yards, 1:20.
- TTU – J'Koby Williams 64-yard run (Stone Harrington kick), 2:05. Red Raiders 34–23. Drive: 3 plays, 73 yards, 0:53.
- ARIZ – Michael Salgado-Medina 22-yard field goal, 0:22. Red Raiders 34–26. Drive: 13 plays, 70 yards, 1:43.

Statistics	ARIZ	TTU
First downs	18	20
Total yards	429	472
Rushing yards	12	328
Passing yards	417	144
Turnovers	0	1
Time of possession	33:20	26:40

Team	Category	Player	Statistics
Arizona	Passing	Noah Fifita	33/45, 417 yards, TD
Arizona	Rushing	Kedrick Reescano	9 rushes, 18 yards, 2 TD
Arizona	Receiving	Isaiah Mizell	7 receptions, 182 yards, TD
Texas Tech	Passing	Tommy Castellanos	11/24, 144 yards, 2 TD
Texas Tech	Rushing	J'Koby Williams	14 rushes, 175 yards, TD
Texas Tech	Receiving	Kenny Johnson	4 receptions, 49 yards, TD

=== West Virginia ===
West Virginia Mountaineers (5–3) at No. 15 Texas Tech Red Raiders (7–1) – Game summary

Quarter	1	2	3	4	Total
Mountaineers	17	10	21	0	48
No. 15 Red Raiders	14	27	0	12	53

at Galaxy Stadium, Lubbock, Texas

- Date: November 7
- Game time: 8:30 p.m. CST
- Game weather: Cloudy • Temperature: 51 °F (11 °C) • Wind: NW 10 mph
- Game attendance: 60,229
- Referee: Luke Richmond
- TV announcers (ESPN): Jay Alter, Tom Luginbill, and Sherree Burress
- Box score, Recap

Game information
First quarter
- TTU – Terrance Carter Jr. 30-yard pass from Tommy Castellanos (Stone Harrington kick), 13:02. Red Raiders 7–0. Drive: 5 plays, 65 yards, 1:58.
- WVU – Amari Latimer 3-yard run (Jack Cassidy kick), 9:26. Tied 7–7. Drive: 8 plays, 75 yards, 3:36.
- WVU – Jack Cassidy 30-yard field goal, 4:39. Mountaineers 10–7. Drive: 7 plays, 71 yards, 3:01.
- TTU – J'Koby Williams 75-yard run (Stone Harrington kick), 4:26. Red Raiders 14–10. Drive: 1 play, 75 yards, 0:13.
- WVU – Michael Hawkins Jr. 3-yard run (Jack Cassidy kick), 0:58. Mountaineers 17–14. Drive: 9 plays, 75 yards, 3:29.

Second quarter

- TTU – Terrance Carter Jr. 29-yard pass from Tommy Castellanos (Stone Harrington kick), 13:37. Red Raiders 21–17. Drive: 7 plays, 75 yards, 2:21.
- WVU – Taron Francis 73-yard pass from Michael Hawkins Jr. (Jack Cassidy kick), 13:06. Mountaineers 24–21. Drive: 2 plays, 75 yards, 0:31.
- TTU – Jett Carpenter 1-yard pass from Tommy Castellanos (Stone Harrington kick), 9:28. Red Raiders 28–24. Drive: 8 plays, 75 yards, 3:38.
- TTU – Kenny Johnson 38-yard pass from Tommy Castellanos (Stone Harrington kick), 7:31. Red Raiders 35–24. Drive: 2 plays, 81 yards, 0:30.
- WVU – Jack Cassidy 29-yard field goal, 2:19. Red Raiders 35–27. Drive: 11 plays, 65 yards, 5:12.
- TTU – Quinten Joyner 1-yard run (run failed), 1:13. Red Raiders 41–27. Drive: 6 plays, 75 yards, 1:06.

Third quarter

- WVU – Michael Hawkins Jr. 2-yard run (Jack Cassidy kick), 11:15. Red Raiders 41–34. Drive: 9 plays, 75 yards, 3:45.
- WVU – Cam Cook 2-yard run (Jack Cassidy kick), 3:50. Tied 41–41. Drive: 4 plays, 84 yards, 1:42.
- WVU – Michael Hawkins Jr. 3-yard run (Jack Cassidy kick), 1:12. Mountaineers 48–41. Drive: 3 plays, 6 yards, 1:08.

Fourth quarter

- TTU – Stone Harrington 46-yard field goal, 7:55. Mountaineers 48–44. Drive: 15 plays, 69 yards, 5:45.
- TTU – Kenny Johnson 5-yard pass from Tommy Castellanos (Stone Harrington kick), 2:44. Red Raiders 51–48. Drive: 9 plays, 69 yards, 3:41.
- TTU – Michael Hawkins Jr. sacked in the end zone by Trey White for a safety, 1:24. Red Raiders 53–48.

Statistics	WVU	TTU
First downs	18	26
Total yards	582	638
Rushing yards	279	276
Passing yards	303	362
Turnovers	0	0
Time of possession	29:45	30:15

Team	Category	Player	Statistics
West Virginia	Passing	Michael Hawkins Jr.	11/16, 303 yards, TD
West Virginia	Rushing	Cam Cook	23 rushes, 149 yards, TD
West Virginia	Receiving	Taron Francis	3 receptions, 169 yards, TD
Texas Tech	Passing	Tommy Castellanos	18/27, 362 yards, 5 TD
Texas Tech	Rushing	J'Koby Williams	19 rushes, 160 yards, 2 TD
Texas Tech	Receiving	Kenny Johnson	5 receptions, 84 yards, 2 TD

=== At No. 25 Oklahoma State ===
No. 12 Texas Tech Red Raiders (8–1) at No. 25 Oklahoma State Cowboys (6–3) – Game summary

Quarter	1	2	3	4	Total
No. 12 Red Raiders	21	7	7	17	52
No. 25 Cowboys	0	20	0	7	27

at Boone Pickens Stadium, Stillwater, Oklahoma

- Date: November 14
- Game time: 8:30 p.m. CST
- Game weather: Sunny • Temperature: 41 °F (5 °C) • Wind: E 8 mph
- Game attendance: 52,168
- Referee: Stephen Baron
- TV announcers (ESPN): Roy Philpott, Brock Osweiler, and Sheree Burress
- Box score, Recap

Game information
First quarter
- TTU – Malcolm Simmons 97-yard kickoff return (Stone Harrington kick), 14:46. Red Raiders 7–0.
- TTU – J'Koby Williams 34-yard run (Stone Harrington kick), 12:03. Red Raiders 14–0. Drive: 2 plays, 70 yards, 0:31.
- TTU – Terrance Carter Jr. 8-yard pass from Thomas Castellanos (Stone Harrington kick), 0:53. Red Raiders 21–0. Drive: 5 plays, 16 yards, 2:20.

Second quarter

- OKST – Sam Keltner 40-yard field goal, 13:30. Red Raiders 21–3. Drive: 6 plays, 62 yards, 2:17.
- OKST – Drew Mestemaker 13-yard run (Sam Keltner kick), 7:33. Red Raiders 21–10. Drive: 1 play, 13 yards, 0:05.
- OKST – Morgan McPhaul 18-yard pass from Drew Mestemaker (Sam Keltner kick), 3:55. Red Raiders 21–17. Drive: 6 plays, 55 yards, 2:31.
- TTU – Micah Hudson 80-yard pass from Tommy Castellanos (Stone Harrington kick), 3:38. Red Raiders 28–17. Drive: 1 play, 75 yards, 0:17.
- OKST – Sam Keltner 24-yard field goal, 0:10. Red Raiders 28–20. Drive: 13 plays, 70 yards, 3:28.

Third quarter

- TTU – Malcolm Simmons 45-yard pass from Tommy Castellanos (Stone Harrington kick), 12:54. Red Raiders 35–20. Drive: 1 play, 45 yards, 0:09.

Fourth quarter

- TTU – Kenny Johnson 30-yard pass from Tommy Castellanos (Stone Harrington kick), 14:54. Red Raiders 42–20. Drive: 5 plays, 77 yards, 2:20.
- TTU – Stone Harrington 54-yard field goal, 8:59. Red Raiders 45–20. Drive: 7 plays, 7 yards, 4:10.
- TTU – Cameron Dickey 2-yard run (Stone Harrington kick), 8:12. Red Raiders 52–20. Drive: 2 plays, 30 yards, 0:36.
- OKST – William Mason 10-yard run (Sam Keltner kick), 0:54. Red Raiders 52–27. Drive: 10 plays, 83 yards, 2:32.

Statistics	TTU	OKST
First downs	17	23
Total yards	442	465
Rushing yards	174	168
Passing yards	268	297
Turnovers	1	2
Time of possession	26:51	33:09

Team	Category	Player	Statistics
Texas Tech	Passing	Tommy Castellanos	12/23, 263 yards, 4 TD
Texas Tech	Rushing	J'Koby Williams	19 rushes, 124 yards, TD
Texas Tech	Receiving	Micah Hudson	2 receptions, 89 yards, TD
Oklahoma State	Passing	Drew Mestemaker	27/42, 277 yards, TD, 2 INT
Oklahoma State	Rushing	Caleb Hawkins	18 rushes, 91 yards
Oklahoma State	Receiving	Justin Bowick	5 receptions, 78 yards

=== At Baylor ===
No. 12 Texas Tech Red Raiders (9–1) at Baylor Bears (6–4) – Game summary

Quarter	1	2	3	4	Total
No. 12 Red Raiders	7	0	7	6	20
Bears	0	7	0	3	10

at McLane Stadium, Waco, Texas

- Date: November 21
- Game time: 2:30 p.m. CST
- Game weather: Cloudy • Temperature: 73 °F (23 °C) • Wind: S 12 mph
- Game attendance: 46,765
- Referee: Hank Johns
- TV announcers (Fox): Jack Kizer and Mark Helfrich
- Box score, Recap

Game information
First quarter
- TTU – J'Koby Williams 1-yard run (Stone Harrington kick), 4:28. Red Raiders 7–0. Drive: 8 plays, 73 yards, 3:41.

Second quarter

- BAY – Matthew Klopfenstein 3-yard pass from DJ Lagway (Rhett Armstrong kick), 8:12. Tied 7–7. Drive: 7 plays, 26 yards, 2:33.

Third quarter

- TTU – Malcolm Simmons 48-yard pass from Tommy Castellanos (Stone Harrington kick), 6:15. Red Raiders 14–7. Drive: 7 plays, 88 yards, 3:05.

Fourth quarter

- TTU – Stone Harrington 34-yard field goal, 10:47. Red Raiders 17–7. Drive: 10 plays, 65 yards, 5:42.
- BAY – Rhett Armstrong 24-yard field goal, 8:05. Red Raiders 17–10. Drive: 7 plays, 68 yards, 2:42.
- TTU – Stone Harrington 39-yard field goal, 2:34. Red Raiders 20–10. Drive: 4 plays, 6 yards, 0:22.

Statistics	TTU	BAY
First downs	16	15
Total yards	402	267
Rushing yards	231	31
Passing yards	171	236
Turnovers	3	0
Time of possession	32:06	27:54

Team	Category	Player	Statistics
Texas Tech	Passing	Tommy Castellanos	10/16, 171 yards, TD, 2 INT
Texas Tech	Rushing	J'Koby Williams	21 rushes, 117 yards, TD
Texas Tech	Receiving	Malcolm Simmons	4 receptions, 61 yards, TD
Baylor	Passing	DJ Lagway	30/48, 236 yards, TD
Baylor	Rushing	Ryelan Morris	8 rushes, 20 yards
Baylor	Receiving	Tony Linvingston	4 receptions, 47 yards

=== TCU ===
TCU Horned Frogs at Texas Tech Red Raiders – Game summary

Quarter	1	2	3	4	Total
Horned Frogs	0	0	0	0	0
Red Raiders	0	0	0	0	0

at Galaxy Stadium, Lubbock, Texas

- Date: November 26
- Game time: 7:00 p.m. CST
- TV: ESPN

Statistics	TCU	TTU
First downs		
Total yards		
Rushing yards		
Passing yards		
Turnovers		
Time of possession		

Team	Category	Player	Statistics
TCU	Passing		
TCU	Rushing		
TCU	Receiving		
Texas Tech	Passing		
Texas Tech	Rushing		
Texas Tech	Receiving		
