= 2025 Texas Tech Red Raiders football team =

American college football season

2025 Texas Tech Red Raiders football

Big 12 champion

Big 12 Championship Game, W 34–7 vs. BYU

Orange Bowl (CFP Quarterfinal), L 0–23 vs. Oregon
- Conference: Big 12 Conference

Ranking
- Coaches: No. 7
- AP: No. 7
- Record: 12–2 (8–1 Big 12)
- Head coach: Joey McGuire (4th season)
- Offensive coordinator: Mack Leftwich (1st season)
- Offensive scheme: Run and gun
- Defensive coordinator: Shiel Wood (1st season)
- Base defense: Multiple 3–4
- Home stadium: Jones AT&T Stadium

2025 Big 12 Conference football standings
	Conf.			Overall
Team	W		L	W		L
No. 7 Texas Tech y$^	8	–	1	12	–	2
No. 11 BYU y	8	–	1	12	–	2
No. 14 Utah	7	–	2	11	–	2
No. 22 Houston	6	–	3	10	–	3
Arizona	6	–	3	9	–	4
Arizona State	6	–	3	8	–	5
No. 25 TCU	5	–	4	9	–	4
Iowa State	5	–	4	8	–	4
Cincinnati	5	–	4	7	–	6
Kansas State	5	–	4	6	–	6
Baylor	3	–	6	5	–	7
Kansas	3	–	6	5	–	7
UCF	2	–	7	5	–	7
West Virginia	2	–	7	4	–	8
Colorado	1	–	8	3	–	9
Oklahoma State	0	–	9	1	–	11
Championship: Texas Tech 34, BYU 7
^ – College Football Playoff participant; $ – Conference champion; y – Championship game participant; Rankings from AP Poll

The 2025 Texas Tech Red Raiders football team represented Texas Tech University during the 2025 NCAA Division I FBS football season. The Red Raiders played their home games at Jones AT&T Stadium located in Lubbock, Texas, and competed as members of the Big 12 Conference. They were led by fourth-year head coach Joey McGuire.

With a loss by Arizona State on November 28, the Red Raiders clinched a berth in the Big 12 Championship Game, their first appearance in the game in program history. In the Big 12 Championship Game, Texas Tech defeated BYU 34–7 for the program's first Big 12 title and won their 12th game of the season, setting a school record for the most wins in a single season. It was also their first conference title since winning a share of the Southwest Conference title in 1994, and their first outright title since winning the SWC in 1955. The Big 12 Championship win also guaranteed the Red Raiders a first-round bye in the playoffs, where they would be defeated by Oregon in the Orange Bowl. All 12 of Texas Tech's regular-season wins and the Big 12 Championship Game had a margin of victory of more than three touchdowns.

The Texas Tech Red Raiders drew an average home attendance of 60,143.

== Offseason ==
=== Coaching changes ===
On December 1, 2024, it was announced that defensive coordinator Tim DeRuyter and secondary coach Marcel Yates had been fired. The Red Raiders finished the regular season with the worst passing defense in the Big 12, allowing 305.3 passing yards per game, which was also the second-most passing yards allowed per game in all of the FBS; only Tulsa allowed more passing yards per game. The following day, December 2, offensive coordinator Zach Kittley was named the new head coach at Florida Atlantic. On December 4, Houston defensive coordinator Shiel Wood was announced as the Red Raiders' new defensive coordinator. On December 6, Texas State offensive coordinator Mack Leftwich was hired as the Red Raiders' new offensive coordinator.

=== Transfers ===
Incoming

Name	Pos.	Height	Weight	Hometown	Prev. school
Romello Height	OLB	6'3"	240 lbs	Dublin, GA	Georgia Tech
Lee Hunter	NT	6'4"	320 lbs	Eight Mile, AL	UCF
Skyler Gill-Howard	DE	6'1"	285 lbs	Chicago, IL	Northern Illinois
Howard Sampson	OT	6'8"	325 lbs	Charlotte, NC	North Carolina
Upton Bellenfant	K	6'2"	180 lbs	Murfreesboro, TN	Buffalo
Terrance Carter	TE	6'2"	239 lbs	Lafayette, LA	Louisiana
Will Jados	OT	6'8"	307 lbs	Columbus, OH	Miami (OH)
Anthony Holmes Jr.	DE	6'2"	295 lbs	Houston, TX	Houston
Brice Pollock	CB	6'1"	175 lbs	Snellville, GA	Mississippi State
Reginald Virgil	WR	6'3"	170 lbs	Mount Dora, FL	Miami (OH)
Quinten Joyner	RB	5'11"	205 lbs	Manor, TX	USC
Tarrion Grant	CB	6'4"	175 lbs	Murfreesboro, TN	Purdue
Hunter Zambrano	OT	6'5"	300 lbs	Fort Lauderdale, FL	Illinois State
Amier Boyd-Matthews	DB	6'1"	180 lbs	Phoenix, AZ	UTEP
Dontae Balfour	CB	6'2"	170 lbs	Starke, FL	Charlotte
Cole Wisniewski	S	6'4"	218 lbs	Sparta, WI	North Dakota State
Mitch Griffis	QB	5'11"	183 lbs	Ashburn, VA	Wake Forest
David Bailey	OLB	6'3"	260 lbs	Irvine, CA	Stanford
Cash Cleveland	G	6'3"	290 lbs	Rockwall, TX	Colorado
Roy Alexander	WR	5'10"	200 lbs	Fort Myers, FL	Incarnate Word
Ian Hershey	K/P	5'10"	190 lbs	Chubbuck, ID	Arizona State

Outgoing

Name	Pos.	Height	Weight	Hometown	New school
Sterling Porcher	OT	6'5"	305 lbs	Sumter, SC	Vanderbilt
Trevon McAlpine	DE	6'3"	280 lbs	Saraland, AL	Tulane
Javeon Wilcox	S	6'1"	200 lbs	Temple, TX	Abilene Christian
Jordan Brown	WR	5'10"	160 lbs	DeSoto, TX	Nevada
Jalon Peoples	CB	6'0"	175 lbs	Cedar Hill, TX	North Dakota State
Kaden Carr	IOL	6'5"	303 lbs	Amarillo, TX	Abilene Christian
Demarion Crest-Daniels	WR	6'3"	185 lbs	El Paso, TX	Garden City CC
Jake Strong	QB	6'1.5"	196 lbs	Justin, TX	McNeese
Ty Buchanan	IOL	6'5"	280 lbs	Corpus Christi, TX	Arizona
Kaden Turner	P	6'2"	190 lbs	San Antonio, TX	Hardin–Simmons
Cameran Brown	QB	6'2"	230 lbs	Warner Robins, GA	Georgia State
Garrett Morphis	IOL	6'4"	300 lbs	Waco, TX	Northwestern State
Brady Boyd	WR	6'1"	185 lbs	Southlake, TX	Utah State
Dalton Merryman	IOL	6'8"	315 lbs	Montgomery, TX	Houston
Micah Hudson	WR	5'11.5"	195 lbs	Temple, TX	Texas A&M (Note: On April 27, 2025, Hudson announced that he would be transferring back to Texas Tech.)
Miles Thompson	CB	5'11"	175 lbs	Cedar Rapids, IA	Northern Illinois
Harvey Dyson III	EDGE	6'3"	260 lbs	Cedar Hill, TX	Tulane
Dylan Shaw	OT	6'4"	300 lbs	Corpus Christi, TX	North Texas
Tyler Murray	OT	6'4"	295 lbs	San Antonio, TX	Mercer
Anthony White	CB	6'0"	170 lbs	Abernathy, TX	Lamar
Nick Fattig	IOL	6'4"	280 lbs	League City, TX	Stanford
Isaac Smith	EDGE	6'5"	235 lbs	Wagoner, OK	Michigan State
Jordan Sanford	CB	5'10.5"	182 lbs	Arlington, TX	California
Devynn Cromwell	CB	6'0"	179 lbs	Guelph, ON	Michigan State
Aiden Meeks	WR	5'11"	175 lbs	Rockwall, TX	Stephen F. Austin
Sammy Morris IV	S	6'1"	200 lbs	Prosper, TX	Abilene Christian
Charlie Robinson	TE	6'2"	220 lbs	Lubbock, TX	Tarleton State
Sam Carrell	EDGE	6'4"	254 lbs	Albuquerque, NM	Rice
Joseph Adedire	EDGE	6'3"	250 lbs	Arlington, TX	NC State
Isaiah Collins	S	6'3"	175 lbs	Huntsville, TX	North Texas
Lorenzo Johnson	WR	5'9.5"	170 lbs	Madisonville, TX	Texas State
Isaiah Crawford	EDGE	6'4"	220 lbs	Post, TX	Abilene Christian
Cam'Ron Valdez	RB	5'10"	190 lbs	Rockdale, TX	TBA

=== Recruiting class ===
College recruiting
Name	Hometown	School	Height	Weight	Commit date
Tristian Gentry; Wide receiver	Stephenville, TX	Stephenville High School	6 ft 1 in (1.85 m)	165 lb (75 kg)	Sep 19, 2023
Tristian Gentry; Wide receiver	Recruit ratings: Rivals: 247Sports: ESPN:				
Lloyd Jones III; Quarterback	Hitchcock, TX	Hitchcock High School	6 ft 4 in (1.93 m)	210 lb (95 kg)	Nov 4, 2023
Lloyd Jones III; Quarterback	Recruit ratings: Rivals: 247Sports: ESPN:				
Leyton Stone; Wide receiver	Wolfforth, TX	Frenship High School	6 ft 2 in (1.88 m)	170 lb (77 kg)	Nov 21, 2023
Leyton Stone; Wide receiver	Recruit ratings: Rivals: 247Sports: ESPN:				
Brock Golwas; Linebacker	Flower Mound, TX	Edward S. Marcus High School	6 ft 1 in (1.85 m)	210 lb (95 kg)	Jan 15, 2024
Brock Golwas; Linebacker	Recruit ratings: Rivals: 247Sports: ESPN:				
Michael Henderson III; Defensive back	Wylie, TX	Wylie East High School	5 ft 9 in (1.75 m)	185 lb (84 kg)	Jan 23, 2024
Michael Henderson III; Defensive back	Recruit ratings: Rivals: 247Sports: ESPN:				
Preztynn Harrison; Tight end	Mineral Wells, TX	Mineral Wells High School	6 ft 6 in (1.98 m)	210 lb (95 kg)	Mar 31, 2024
Preztynn Harrison; Tight end	Recruit ratings: Rivals: 247Sports: ESPN:				
Dylan Singleton; Defensive tackle	Loreauville, LA	Loreauville High School	6 ft 4 in (1.93 m)	280 lb (130 kg)	Apr 17, 2024
Dylan Singleton; Defensive tackle	Recruit ratings: Rivals: 247Sports: ESPN:				
Bryson Jones; Wide receiver	Frisco, TX	Lone Star High School	6 ft 3 in (1.91 m)	180 lb (82 kg)	Jun 10, 2024
Bryson Jones; Wide receiver	Recruit ratings: Rivals: 247Sports: ESPN:				
Deante Lindsay; Defensive back	Ada, OK	Ada High School	6 ft 2 in (1.88 m)	165 lb (75 kg)	Jun 15, 2024
Deante Lindsay; Defensive back	Recruit ratings: Rivals: 247Sports: ESPN:				
Patrick McMath; Offensive line	Katy, TX	Katy High School	6 ft 4 in (1.93 m)	265 lb (120 kg)	Jun 18, 2024
Patrick McMath; Offensive line	Recruit ratings: Rivals: 247Sports: ESPN:				
Garin Maley; Offensive line	Papillion, NE	Papillion-La Vista Senior High School	6 ft 6 in (1.98 m)	260 lb (120 kg)	Jun 23, 2024
Garin Maley; Offensive line	Recruit ratings: Rivals: 247Sports: ESPN:				
Elias Gillen; Offensive line	Rapid City, SD	Stevens High School	6 ft 6 in (1.98 m)	310 lb (140 kg)	Jun 24, 2024
Elias Gillen; Offensive line	Recruit ratings: Rivals: 247Sports: ESPN:				
Ren Brown; Offensive line	Stanton, NE	Stanton High School	6 ft 5 in (1.96 m)	297 lb (135 kg)	Jun 28, 2024
Ren Brown; Offensive line	Recruit ratings: Rivals: 247Sports: ESPN:				
Michael Dever; Wide receiver	Lubbock, TX	Lubbock-Cooper High School	6 ft 2 in (1.88 m)	175 lb (79 kg)	Jul 4, 2024
Michael Dever; Wide receiver	Recruit ratings: Rivals: 247Sports: ESPN:				
Braylan McDonald; Safety	Lancaster, TX	Lancaster High School	6 ft 0 in (1.83 m)	175 lb (79 kg)	Aug 2, 2024
Braylan McDonald; Safety	Recruit ratings: Rivals: 247Sports: ESPN:				
Danilo Guberinich; Offensive line	Novi, MI	Catholic Central High School	6 ft 5 in (1.96 m)	300 lb (140 kg)	Nov 21, 2024
Danilo Guberinich; Offensive line	Recruit ratings: Rivals: 247Sports: ESPN:				
Connor Carty; Offensive line	Prosper, TX	Prosper High School	6 ft 5 in (1.96 m)	295 lb (134 kg)	Dec 4, 2024
Connor Carty; Offensive line	Recruit ratings: Rivals: 247Sports: ESPN:				
Sean Robinson; Wide receiver	Cibolo, TX	Byron P. Steele II High School	6 ft 5 in (1.96 m)	215 lb (98 kg)	Dec 4, 2024
Sean Robinson; Wide receiver	Recruit ratings: Rivals: 247Sports: ESPN:				

== Schedule ==
Date	Time	Opponent	Rank	Site	TV	Result	Attendance
August 30	6:30 p.m.	Arkansas–Pine Bluff*	No. 23	Jones AT&T Stadium; Lubbock, TX	ESPN+	W 67–7	60,229
September 6	11:00 a.m.	Kent State*	No. 24	Jones AT&T Stadium; Lubbock, TX	TNT/TruTV	W 62–14	60,229
September 13	2:30 p.m.	Oregon State*	No. 21	Jones AT&T Stadium; Lubbock, TX	Fox	W 45–14	60,229
September 20	11:00 a.m.	at No. 16 Utah	No. 17	Rice–Eccles Stadium; Salt Lake City, UT (Big Noon Kickoff)	Fox	W 34–10	52,236
October 4	6:00 p.m.	at Houston	No. 11	TDECU Stadium; Houston, TX (rivalry)	ESPN	W 35–11	42,806
October 11	6:30 p.m.	Kansas^{†}	No. 9	Jones AT&T Stadium; Lubbock, TX	Fox	W 42–17	60,229
October 18	3:00 p.m.	at Arizona State	No. 7	Mountain America Stadium; Tempe, AZ	Fox	L 22–26	54,177
October 25	3:00 p.m.	Oklahoma State	No. 14	Jones AT&T Stadium; Lubbock, TX	ESPNU	W 42–0	59,625
November 1	2:30 p.m.	at Kansas State	No. 13	Bill Snyder Family Football Stadium; Manhattan, KS	Fox	W 43–20	52,111
November 8	11:00 a.m.	No. 7 BYU	No. 8	Jones AT&T Stadium; Lubbock, TX (College GameDay)	ABC	W 29–7	60,229
November 15	2:30 p.m.	UCF	No. 6	Jones AT&T Stadium; Lubbock, TX	Fox	W 48–9	60,229
November 29	11:00 a.m.	at West Virginia	No. 5	Milan Puskar Stadium; Morgantown, WV	ESPN	W 49–0	44,250
December 6	11:00 a.m.	vs. No. 11 BYU	No. 4	AT&T Stadium; Arlington, TX (Big 12 Championship Game)	ABC	W 34–7	85,519
January 1, 2026	11:00 a.m.	vs. (5) No. 5 Oregon*	(4) No. 4	Hard Rock Stadium; Miami Gardens, FL (Orange Bowl–CFP Quarterfinal)	ESPN	L 0–23	65,021
*Non-conference game; ^{†}Homecoming; Rankings from AP Poll (and CFP Rankings, after November 4) - Released prior to game; All times are in Central time

== Rankings ==
Ranking movements Legend: ██ Increase in ranking ██ Decrease in ranking т = Tied with team above or below
	Week																
Poll	Pre	1	2	3	4	5	6	7	8	9	10	11	12	13	14	15	Final
AP	23	24	21	17	12	11	9	7	14	13	9	8	6т	7	5	4	7
Coaches	24	23	20	16	14	14	10	8	15	13	9	8	7	7	6	4	7
CFP	Not released										8	6	5	5	4	4	Not released

== Personnel ==
2025 Texas Tech Red Raiders football team roster
Players
Coaches
Offense

Pos.	#	Name	Class
RB	0	Quinten Joyner (injured)	So
WR	1	Reggie Virgil (C)	Sr
QB	2	Behren Morton (C)	Sr
WR	3	Coy Eakin (C)	Jr
WR	4	T. J. West	So
WR	5	Caleb Douglas (C)	Sr
WR	6	Kelby Valsin	So
TE	7	Terrance Carter Jr. (C)	Jr
RB	8	Cameron Dickey	So
TE	9	Johncarlos Miller II (C)	Sr
QB	10	Lloyd Jones III	Fr
WR	11	Tyson Turner	Fr
QB	12	Mitch Griffis (C)	Sr
WR	13	Price Morgan	Jr
WR	14	Micah Hudson	So
QB	15	Will Hammond (injured)	Fr
QB	16	Holden Phillips	Fr
WR	17	Leyton Stone	Fr
WR	18	Roy Alexander	Sr
WR	19	Haydon Wiginton (C)	Sr
RB	20	J'Koby Williams	So
WR	21	Tristian Gentry	Fr
RB	23	Adam Hill	Fr
OL	50	Patrick McMath	Fr
OL	50	Eddy Smith	Fr
OL	52	Cash Cleveland	So
OL	53	Colton Hendrix	Fr
OL	56	Davion Carter (C)	Sr
OL	57	Hunter Zambrano (C)	Sr
OL	61	Connor Carty	Fr
OL	64	Jurrien Loftin	Jr
OL	65	D'Anthis Upshaw	Fr
OL	66	Jackson Hildebrand	Fr
OL	68	Ren Brown	Fr
OL	70	Jacob Ponton	Fr
OL	71	Vinny Sciury	Sr
OL	72	Sheridan Wilson (C)	Jr
OL	73	Danilo Guberinich	Fr
OL	74	Daniel Sill	So
OL	75	Garin Maley	Fr
OL	76	Will Jados (C)	Sr
OL	77	Elias Gillen	Fr
OL	78	Ellis Davis	Fr
OL	79	Howard Sampson (C)	Jr
TE	83	Jack Esparza	Jr
WR	84	Michael Dever	Fr
WR	85	Bryson Jones	Fr
TE	86	Sean Robinson	Fr
WR	87	Preztynn Harrison	Fr
TE	88	Trey Jackson	Fr
TE	89	Jason Llewellyn	Jr

Defense

Pos.	#	Name	Class
DL	0	Skyler Gill-Howard (injured) (C)	Sr
S	1	A. J. McCarty (C)	Sr
DL	2	Lee Hunter (C)	Sr
LB	3	Bryce Ramirez (C)	Sr
CB	4	Maurion Horn	Jr
S	5	Cole Wisniewski (C)	Sr
LB	6	John Curry	So
S	7	Brenden Jordan (C)	Jr
DL	8	E'Maurion Banks (C)	Sr
OLB	9	Romello Height (C)	Sr
LB	10	Jacob Rodriguez (C)	Sr
OLB	11	Charles Esters III (C)	Sr
CB	12	Macho Stevenson	So
LB	13	Ben Roberts (C)	Jr
CB	14	Brice Pollock (C)	Jr
S	15	Oliver Miles	Fr
CB	16	Ashton Hampton	Fr
S	17	Peyton Morgan	Fr
OLB	18	Terrell Tilmon (C)	Sr
S	19	Quintaelyn Joyner	Fr
CB	20	Dontae Balfour	Sr
S	21	Miquel Dingle	So
S	22	Marcus Ramon-Edwards	So
CB	23	Tarrion Grant	So
S	24	Malik Esquerra	Fr
S	25	Chapman Lewis	Jr
CB	26	Deante Lindsay	Fr
CB	27	Amier Boyd	Jr
S	28	Braylan McDonald	Fr
S	29	Chief Collins (C)	Sr
S	30	Mikal Harrison-Pilot	So
OLB	31	David Bailey (C)	Sr
OLB	32	Cheta Ofili	Fr
DL	33	A. J. Holmes Jr. (C)	Jr
LB	34	Trent Low (C)	Sr
S	35	Michael Henderson III	Fr
LB	36	Justin Horne	So
S	39	Luke Dillingham (C)	Sr
LB	40	Wesley Smith	Jr
LB	41	Brock Golwas	Fr
LB	43	Chris Lemons	So
LB	48	Gage Elder (C)	Sr
DL	51	Jayden Cofield	So
DL	58	Tanner Allen	Jr
OLB	85	Dylan Spencer	So
DL	88	Amier Washington	So
OLB	90	Ansel Nedore	So
DL	92	Kasen Long	Fr
DL	93	Dylan Singleton (injured)	Fr
OLB	94	Braylon Rigsby	So
DL	96	Keyshawn Williams	Fr
OLB	97	Charles Anderson Jr.	Fr

Special teams

Pos.	#	Name	Class
K	27	Upton Bellenfant	Jr
P, K	37	Ian Hershey	Jr
P	41	Jack Burgess	Sr
LS	47	Rylan Vagana	Fr
K	48	Stone Harrington	Jr

Head coach

- Joey McGuire

Coordinators/assistant coaches

- Kenny Perry
  Associate head coach/Special teams coordinator
- Justin Johnson
  Assistant head coach/Passing game coordinator/Wide receivers
- Mack Leftwich
  Offensive coordinator/quarterbacks
- Shiel Wood
  Defensive coordinator
- C. J. Ah You
  Outside linebackers
- Josh Cochran
  Run game coordinator/tight ends
- Zarnell Fitch
  Defensive line
- Rob Greene
  Safeties
- Darcel McBath
  Cornerbacks
- Clay McGuire
  Offensive line
- Garret McGuire
  Running backs
- Jack Teachey
  Senior defensive analyst
- Lindsey Scott Jr.
  Assistant quarterbacks
- Lance Barilow
  Strength and conditioning

Legend

- (C) Team captain
- (S) Suspended
- (I) Ineligible
- Injured
- Redshirt

Roster
Last update: October 27, 2025

== Game summaries ==
=== Arkansas–Pine Bluff (FCS) ===
Arkansas–Pine Bluff Golden Lions (FCS) (0–0) at No. 23 Texas Tech Red Raiders (0–0) – Game summary

Quarter	1	2	3	4	Total
Golden Lions (FCS)	0	0	0	7	7
No. 23 Red Raiders	23	24	14	6	67

at Jones AT&T Stadium, Lubbock, Texas

- Date: August 30
- Game time: 6:30 p.m. CDT
- Game weather: Cloudy, 83 °F (28 °C)
- Game attendance: 60,229
- Referee: Dan Scanlan
- TV announcers (ESPN+): Ted Emrich and Jeff Woody
- Box score, Recap

Game information
First quarter
- TTU – Reggie Virgil 9-yard pass from Behren Morton (Stone Harrington kick), 11:44. Red Raiders 7–0. Drive: 4 plays, 39 yards, 1:07.
- TTU – Terrance Carter Jr. 21-yard pass from Behren Morton (Stone Harrington kick), 10:12. Red Raiders 14–0. Drive: 1 play, 21 yards, 0:07.
- TTU – Upton Bellenfant 29-yard field goal, 4:47. Red Raiders 17–0. Drive: 8 plays, 61 yards, 3:07.
- TTU – Terrance Carter Jr. 9-yard pass from Behren Morton (run failed), 2:15. Red Raiders 23–0. Drive: 6 plays, 28 yards, 2:14.

Second quarter

- TTU – Coy Eakin 41-yard pass from Behren Morton (Stone Harrington kick), 13:58. Red Raiders 30–0. Drive: 5 plays, 70 yards, 1:08.
- TTU – J'Koby Williams 5-yard run (Stone Harrington kick), 8:56. Red Raiders 37–0. Drive: 8 plays, 80 yards, 3:06.
- TTU – Stone Harrington 31-yard field goal, 4:49. Red Raiders 40–0. Drive: 7 plays, 43 yards, 2:12.
- TTU – Cameron Dickey 2-yard run (Ian Hershey kick), 1:21. Red Raiders 47–0. Drive: 4 plays, 51 yards, 0:54.

Third quarter

- TTU – Will Hammond 64-yard run (Upton Bellenfant kick), 6:28. Red Raiders 54–0. Drive: 5 plays, 80 yards, 1:23.
- TTU – Leyton Stone 9-yard pass from Will Hammond (Stone Harrington kick), 3:00. Red Raiders 61–0. Drive: 5 plays, 68 yards, 1:47.

Fourth quarter

- UAPB – Ellis Stewart 7-yard pass from Christian Peters (Trey Glymph kick), 6:16. Red Raiders 61–7. Drive: 12 plays, 75 yards, 11:44.
- TTU – Bryson Jones 13-yard pass from Mitch Griffis (kick failed), 3:20. Red Raiders 67–7. Drive: 7 plays, 85 yards, 2:41.

Statistics	UAPB	TTU
First downs	11	33
Plays–yards	59–175	61–608
Rushes–yards	26–53	29–294
Passing yards	122	314
Passing: comp–att–int	17–33–1	25–32–0
Turnovers	1	0
Time of possession	32:38	27:22

Team	Category	Player	Statistics
Arkansas–Pine Bluff	Passing	Christian Peters	17/33, 123 yards, TD, INT
Arkansas–Pine Bluff	Rushing	Za'Marion Webber	15 carries, 42 yards
Arkansas–Pine Bluff	Receiving	Kareem Burke	3 receptions, 33 yards
Texas Tech	Passing	Behren Morton	16/18, 201 yards, 4 TD
Texas Tech	Rushing	Cameron Dickey	12 carries, 90 yards, TD
Texas Tech	Receiving	Reggie Virgil	4 receptions, 56 yards, TD

The game was suspended at halftime due to a thunderstorm entering Lubbock. Once play resumed, the second half was played with two, eight-minute quarters.

=== Kent State ===
Kent State Golden Flashes (1–0) at No. 24 Texas Tech Red Raiders (1–0) – Game summary

Quarter	1	2	3	4	Total
Golden Flashes	0	0	0	14	14
No. 24 Red Raiders	21	27	7	7	62

at Jones AT&T Stadium, Lubbock, Texas

- Date: September 6
- Game time: 11:00 a.m. CDT
- Game weather: Cloudy, 58 °F (14 °C)
- Game attendance: 60,229
- Referee: Tim Rich
- TV announcers (TNT): J. B. Long, Mike Golic Jr., and Allie LaForce
- Box score, Recap

Game information
First quarter
- TTU – Reggie Virgil 35-yard pass from Behren Morton (Stone Harrington kick), 11:53. Red Raiders 7–0. Drive: 8 plays, 78 yards, 3:07.
- TTU – Cameron Dickey 2-yard run (Upton Bellenfant kick), 9:57. Red Raiders 14–0. Drive: 3 plays, 12 yards, 1:00.
- TTU – Coy Eakin 42-yard pass from Behren Morton (Stone Harrington kick), 6:31. Red Raiders 21–0. Drive: 4 plays, 76 yards, 0:58.

Second quarter

- TTU – Upton Bellenfant 23-yard field goal, 14:19. Red Raiders 24–0. Drive: 8 plays, 32 yards, 1:42.
- TTU – Cameron Dickey 1-yard run (Stone Harrington kick), 10:24. Red Raiders 31–0. Drive: 7 plays, 46 yards, 2:51.
- TTU – Skyler Gill-Howard 55-yard interception return (Upton Bellenfant kick), 8:35. Red Raiders 38–0.
- TTU – Stone Harrington 47-yard field goal, 1:48. Red Raiders 41–0. Drive: 9 plays, 16 yards, 3:10.
- TTU – Reggie Virgil 3-yard pass from Behren Morton (Upton Bellenfant kick), 0:12. Red Raiders 48–0. Drive: 4 plays, 60 yards, 0:31.

Third quarter

- TTU – Bryson Jones 38-yard pass from Will Hammond (Stone Harrington kick), 5:06. Red Raiders 55–0. Drive: 4 plays, 57 yards, 1:16.

Fourth quarter

- KENT – Dru DeShields 10-yard run (Will Hryszko kick), 12:11. Red Raiders 55–7. Drive: 7 plays, 83 yards, 3:43.
- KENT – Cade Wolford 16-yard pass from Dru DeShields (Will Hryszko kick), 10:20. Red Raiders 55–14. Drive: 3 plays, 31 yards, 1:27.
- TTU – Will Hammond 13-yard run (Upton Bellenfant kick), 6:49. Red Raiders 62–14. Drive: 8 plays, 75 yards, 3:31.

Statistics	KENT	TTU
First downs	10	27
Plays–yards	59–228	80–601
Rushes–yards	34–63	42–230
Passing yards	165	371
Passing: comp–att–int	11–25–1	27–38–0
Turnovers	2	1
Time of possession	29:57	30:03

Team	Category	Player	Statistics
Kent State	Passing	Dru DeShields	7/15, 116 yards, TD
Kent State	Rushing	Gavin Garcia	12 carries, 25 yards
Kent State	Receiving	Ardell Banks	2 receptions, 49 yards
Texas Tech	Passing	Behren Morton	18/26, 258 yards, 3 TD
Texas Tech	Rushing	Adam Hill	16 carries, 127 yards
Texas Tech	Receiving	Coy Eakin	3 receptions, 59 yards, TD

=== Oregon State ===
Oregon State Beavers (0–2) at No. 21 Texas Tech Red Raiders (2–0) – Game summary

Quarter	1	2	3	4	Total
Beavers	0	0	0	14	14
No. 21 Red Raiders	14	14	10	7	45

at Jones AT&T Stadium, Lubbock, Texas

- Date: September 13
- Game time: 2:30 p.m. CDT
- Game weather: Cloudy, 81 °F (27 °C)
- Game attendance: 60,229
- Referee: Chris Wiggins
- TV announcers (Fox): Tim Brando, Devin Gardner, and Josh Sims
- Box score, Recap

Game information
First quarter
- TTU – Coy Eakin 38-yard pass from Behren Morton (Stone Harrington kick), 12:00. Red Raiders 7–0. Drive: 5 plays, 50 yards, 0:57.
- TTU – Caleb Douglas 61-yard pass from Behren Morton (Upton Bellenfant kick), 6:27. Red Raiders 14–0. Drive: 5 plays, 79 yards, 2:00.

Second quarter

- TTU – J'Koby Williams 30-yard pass from Behren Morton (Stone Harrington kick), 10:01. Red Raiders 21–0. Drive: 10 plays, 49 yards, 0:31.
- TTU – J'Koby Williams 3-yard run (Upton Bellenfant kick), 6:35. Red Raiders 28–0. Drive: 7 plays, 70 yards, 1:26.

Third quarter

- TTU – Terrance Carter Jr. 23-yard pass from Behren Morton (Stone Harrington kick), 11:26. Red Raiders 35–0. Drive: 10 plays, 84 yards, 3:27.
- TTU – Upton Bellenfant 21-yard field goal, 1:07. Red Raiders 38–0. Drive: 12 plays, 94 yards, 5:32.

Fourth quarter

- TTU – Cameron Dickey 4-yard run (Ian Hershey kick), 10:43. Red Raiders 45–0. Drive: 9 plays, 55 yards, 4:11.
- ORST – Bryce Caufield 6-yard pass from Maalik Murphy (Caleb Ojeda kick), 5:05. Red Raiders 45–7. Drive: 5 plays, 72 yards, 3:03.
- ORST – Karson Boschma 26-yard pass from Maalik Murphy (Caleb Ojeda kick), 1:53. Red Raiders 45–14. Drive: 5 plays, 40 yards, 3:16.

Statistics	ORST	TTU
First downs	17	30
Plays–yards	68–289	81–599
Rushes–yards	22–8	40–121
Passing yards	281	478
Passing: comp–att–int	25–46–2	27–41–2
Turnovers	2	2
Time of possession	29:00	31:00

Team	Category	Player	Statistics
Oregon State	Passing	Maalik Murphy	25/44, 281 yards, 2 TD, 2 INT
Oregon State	Rushing	Anthony Hankerson	11 carries, 12 yards
Oregon State	Receiving	David Wells Jr.	6 receptions, 103 yards
Texas Tech	Passing	Behren Morton	23/35, 464 yards, 4 TD, INT
Texas Tech	Rushing	Cameron Dickey	16 carries, 65 yards, TD
Texas Tech	Receiving	Coy Eakin	5 receptions, 123 yards, TD

=== At No. 16 Utah ===
No. 17 Texas Tech Red Raiders (3–0) at No. 16 Utah Utes (3–0) – Game summary

Quarter	1	2	3	4	Total
No. 17 Red Raiders	7	3	0	24	34
No. 16 Utes	0	3	0	7	10

at Rice–Eccles Stadium, Salt Lake City, Utah

- Date: September 20
- Game time: 11:00 a.m. CDT/10:00 a.m. MDT
- Game weather: Cloudy, 67 °F (19 °C)
- Game attendance: 52,236
- Referee: Michael VanderVelde
- TV announcers (Fox): Gus Johnson, Joel Klatt, and Jenny Taft
- Box score, Recap

Game information
First quarter
- TTU – Cameron Dickey 1-yard run (Stone Harrington kick), 10:13. Red Raiders 7–0. Drive: 7 plays, 85 yards, 3:01.

Second quarter

- TTU – Stone Harrington 58-yard field goal, 0:48. Red Raiders 10–0. 'Drive: 8 plays, 13 yards, 1:23.
- UTAH – Dillon Curtis 32-yard field goal, 0:00. Red Raiders 10–3. Drive: 9 plays, 61 yards, 0:48.

Third quarter

- No scoring plays

Fourth quarter

- TTU – Stone Harrington 25-yard field goal, 12:33. Red Raiders 13–3. Drive: 12 plays, 79 yards, 4:30.
- UTAH – Wayshawn Parker 5-yard run (Dillon Curtis kick), 10:22. Red Raiders 13–10. Drive: 8 plays, 75 yards, 2:11.
- TTU – Terrance Carter Jr. 24-yard pass from Will Hammond (Stone Harrington kick), 8:29. Red Raiders 20–10. Drive: 4 plays, 75 yards, 1:53.
- TTU – Cameron Dickey 24-yard run (Stone Harrington kick), 3:41. Red Raiders 27–10. Drive: 7 plays, 68 yards, 3:47.
- TTU – Reggie Virgil 21-yard pass from Will Hammond (Stone Harrington kick), 1:53. Red Raiders 34–10. Drive: 3 plays, 28 yards, 0:40.

Statistics	TTU	UTAH
First downs	20	16
Plays–yards	72–484	69–263
Rushes–yards	37–173	31–101
Passing yards	311	162
Passing: comp–att–int	25–35–2	25–38–2
Turnovers	2	4
Time of possession	32:15	27:45

Team	Category	Player	Statistics
Texas Tech	Passing	Will Hammond	13/16, 169 yards, 2 TD
Texas Tech	Rushing	Cameron Dickey	13 carries, 67 yards, 2 TD
Texas Tech	Receiving	Reggie Virgil	6 receptions, 72 yards, TD
Utah	Passing	Devon Dampier	25/38, 162 yards, 2 INT
Utah	Rushing	NaQuari Rogers	10 carries, 37 yards
Utah	Receiving	Dallen Bentley	6 receptions, 75 yards

=== at Houston ===
No. 11 Texas Tech Red Raiders (4–0) at Houston Cougars (4–0) – Game summary

Quarter	1	2	3	4	Total
No. 11 Red Raiders	15	10	3	7	35
Cougars	3	8	0	0	11

at TDECU Stadium, Houston, Texas

- Date: October 4
- Game time: 6:00 p.m. CDT
- Game weather: Cloudy, 88 °F (31 °C)
- Game attendance: 42,806
- Referee: Mike McCabe
- TV announcers (ESPN): Dave Pasch, Dusty Dvoracek, and Taylor McGregor
- Box score, Recap

Game information
First quarter
- TTU – Stone Harrington 26-yard field goal, 10:31. Red Raiders 3–0. Drive: 13 plays, 68 yards, 4:25.
- TTU – Upton Bellenfant 33-yard field goal, 9:38. Red Raiders 6–0. Drive: 4 plays, 1 yard, 0:47.
- TTU – Stone Harrington 23-yard field goal, 4:34. Red Raiders 9–0. Drive: 9 plays, 43 yards, 3:23.
- HOU – Ethan Sanchez 24-yard field goal, 2:16. Red Raiders 9–3. Drive: 8 plays, 69 yards, 2:14.
- TTU – Cameron Dickey 69-yard pass from Behren Morton (pass failed), 0:56. Red Raiders 15–3. Drive: 3 plays, 75 yards, 1:20.

Second quarter

- TTU – J'Koby Williams 5-yard run (Upton Bellenfant kick), 11:11. Red Raiders 22–3. Drive: 5 plays, 25 yards, 1:50.
- TTU – Stone Harrington 26-yard field goal, 1:53. Red Raiders 25–3. Drive: 10 plays, 47 yards, 4:12.
- HOU – Amare Thomas 64-yard pass from Zeon Chriss (Zeon Chriss pass to Stephon Johnson), 1:27. Red Raiders 25–11. Drive: 2 plays, 75 yards, 0:26.

Third quarter

- TTU – Upton Bellenfant 29-yard field goal, 7:44. Red Raiders 28–11. Drive: 13 plays, 73 yards, 5:42.

Fourth quarter

- TTU – J'Koby Williams 1-yard run (Upton Bellenfant kick), 11:34. Red Raiders 35–11. Drive: 7 plays, 38 yards, 3:22.

Statistics	TTU	HOU
First downs	27	12
Plays–yards	90–552	55–267
Rushes–yards	50–207	30–103
Passing yards	345	164
Passing: comp–att–int	28–40–0	10–25–2
Turnovers	1	3
Time of possession	37:58	22:02

Team	Category	Player	Statistics
Texas Tech	Passing	Behren Morton	28/40, 345 yards, TD
Texas Tech	Rushing	J'Koby Williams	19 carries, 107 yards, 2 TD
Texas Tech	Receiving	Caleb Douglas	7 receptions, 114 yards
Houston	Passing	Zeon Chriss	5/13, 93 yards, TD, INT
Houston	Rushing	Zeon Chriss	7 carries, 59 yards
Houston	Receiving	Amare Thomas	2 receptions, 70 yards, TD

=== Kansas ===
Kansas Jayhawks (4–2) at No. 9 Texas Tech Red Raiders (5–0) – Game summary

Quarter	1	2	3	4	Total
Jayhawks	0	17	0	0	17
No. 9 Red Raiders	18	3	7	14	42

at Jones AT&T Stadium, Lubbock, Texas

- Date: October 11
- Game time: 6:30 p.m. CDT
- Game weather: Sunny, 81 °F (27 °C)
- Game attendance: 60,229
- Referee: Kevin Boitmann
- TV announcers (Fox): Jason Benetti, Robert Griffin III, and Alexa Landestoy
- Box score, Recap

Game information
First quarter
- TTU – Cameron Dickey 71-yard run (Stone Harrington kick), 10:38. Red Raiders 7–0. Drive: 1 play, 71 yards, 0:11.
- TTU – Terrance Carter Jr. 21-yard pass from Behren Morton (Johncarlos Miller II run), 8:39. Red Raiders 15–0. Drive: 5 plays, 36 yards, 1:51.
- TTU – Upton Bellenfant 25-yard field goal, 3:38. Red Raiders 18–0. Drive: 11 plays, 69 yards, 3:31.

Second quarter

- TTU – Stone Harrington 40-yard field goal, 11:03. Red Raiders 21–0. Drive: 11 plays, 58 yards, 3:27.
- KU – Leshon Williams 10-yard pass from Jalon Daniels (Laith Marjan kick), 6:40. Red Raiders 21–7. Drive: 8 plays, 75 yards, 4:23.
- KU – Boden Groen 24-yard pass from Jalon Daniels (Laith Marjan kick), 1:17. Red Raiders 21–14. Drive: 6 plays, 49 yards, 1:04.
- KU – Laith Marjan 55-yard field goal, 0:00. Red Raiders 21–17. Drive: 5 plays, 29 yards, 0:28.

Third quarter

- TTU – Will Hammond 20-yard run (Upton Bellenfant kick), 7:28. Red Raiders 28–17. Drive: 5 plays, 63 yards, 2:03.

Fourth quarter

- TTU – Cameron Dickey 55-yard run (Stone Harrington kick), 14:12. Red Raiders 35–17. Drive: 6 plays, 80 yards, 2:00.
- TTU – Will Hammond 10-yard run (Upton Bellenfant kick), 3:31. Red Raiders 42–17. Drive: 2 plays, 30 yards, 0:55.

Statistics	KU	TTU
First downs	23	22
Plays–yards	77–319	68–505
Rushes–yards	38–47	40–372
Passing yards	272	133
Passing: comp–att–int	30–39–0	14–28–1
Turnovers	1	1
Time of possession	36:12	23:48

Team	Category	Player	Statistics
Kansas	Passing	Jalon Daniels	27/33, 255 yards, 2 TD
Kansas	Rushing	Daniel Hishaw Jr.	8 carries, 53 yards
Kansas	Receiving	Boden Groen	13 receptions, 76 yards, TD
Texas Tech	Passing	Behren Morton	7/12, 91 yards, TD
Texas Tech	Rushing	Cameron Dickey	21 carries, 263 yards, 2 TD
Texas Tech	Receiving	Caleb Douglas	6 receptions, 55 yards

=== at Arizona State ===
No. 7 Texas Tech Red Raiders (6–0) at Arizona State Sun Devils (4–2) – Game summary

Quarter	1	2	3	4	Total
No. 7 Red Raiders	0	7	0	15	22
Sun Devils	3	6	7	10	26

at Mountain America Stadium, Tempe, Arizona

- Date: October 18
- Game time: 3:00 p.m. CDT / 1:00 p.m. MST
- Game weather: Clear, 81 °F (27 °C)
- Game attendance: 54,117
- Referee: Luke Richmond
- TV announcers (Fox): Connor Onion, Mark Helfrich, and Jen Hale
- Box score, Recap

Game information
First quarter
- ASU – Jesus Gomez 34-yard field goal, 1:43. Sun Devils 3–0. Drive: 9 plays, 62 yards, 4:08.

Second quarter

- ASU – Jesus Gomez 47-yard field goal, 14:00. Sun Devils 6–0. Drive: 5 plays, 33 yards, 1:30.
- TTU – Coy Eakin 30-yard pass from Will Hammond (Stone Harrington kick), 5:57. Red Raiders 7–6. Drive: 5 plays, 45 yards, 2:21.
- ASU – Jesus Gomez 26-yard field goal, 1:43. Sun Devils 9–7. Drive: 10 plays, 66 yards, 4:14.

Third quarter

- ASU – Jordyn Tyson 2-yard pass from Sam Leavitt (Jesus Gomez kick), 8:50. Sun Devils 16–7. Drive: 7 plays, 21 yards, 3:41.

Fourth quarter

- ASU – Jesus Gomez 28-yard field goal, 14:14. Sun Devils 19–7. Drive: 16 plays, 69 yards, 8:20.
- TTU – Will Hammond 1-yard run (Upton Bellenfant kick), 3:45. Sun Devils 19–14. Drive: 11 plays, 48 yards, 3:36.
- TTU – Reggie Virgil 12-yard pass from Will Hammond (Will Hammond run), 2:00. Red Raiders 22–19. Drive: 1 play, 12 yards, 0:05.
- ASU – Raleek Brown 1-yard run (Jesus Gomez kick), 0:34. Sun Devils 26–22. Drive: 10 plays, 75 yards, 1:26.

Statistics	TTU	ASU
First downs	16	21
Plays–yards	65–276	83–394
Rushes–yards	27–109	36–75
Passing yards	167	319
Passing: comp–att–int	22–38–1	28–47–0
Turnovers	1	0
Time of possession	22:48	37:12

Team	Category	Player	Statistics
Texas Tech	Passing	Will Hammond	22/37, 167 yards, 2 TD, INT
Texas Tech	Rushing	Will Hammond	15 carries, 47 yards, TD
Texas Tech	Receiving	Coy Eakin	5 receptions, 66 yards, TD
Arizona State	Passing	Sam Leavitt	28/47, 319 yards, TD
Arizona State	Rushing	Raleek Brown	19 carries, 69 yards, TD
Arizona State	Receiving	Jordyn Tyson	10 receptions, 105 yards, TD

=== Oklahoma State ===
Oklahoma State Cowboys (1–6) at No. 14 Texas Tech Red Raiders (6–1) – Game summary

Quarter	1	2	3	4	Total
Cowboys	0	0	0	0	0
No. 14 Red Raiders	21	7	14	0	42

at Jones AT&T Stadium, Lubbock, Texas

- Date: October 25
- Game time: 3:00 p.m. CDT
- Game weather: Cloudy, 69 °F (21 °C)
- Game attendance: 59,625
- Referee: David Alvarez
- TV announcers (ESPNU): Justin Kutcher and Dustin Fox
- Box score, Recap

Game information
First quarter
- TTU – J'Koby Williams 99-yard kickoff return (Upton Bellenfant kick), 14:46. Red Raiders 7–0.
- TTU – J'Koby Williams 26-yard pass from Will Hammond (kick failed), 12:56. Red Raiders 13–0. Drive: 1 play, 26 yards, 0:11.
- TTU – Cameron Dickey 7-yard run (Cameron Dickey run), 1:30. Red Raiders 21–0. Drive: 13 plays, 82 yards, 5:48.

Second quarter

- TTU – Jacob Rodriguez 69-yard fumble return (Upton Bellenfant kick), 5:30. Red Raiders 28–0.

Third quarter

- TTU – Caleb Douglas 42-yard pass from Mitch Griffis (Stone Harrington kick), 9:25. Red Raiders 35–0. Drive: 8 plays, 83 yards, 3:17.
- TTU – Mitch Griffis 1-yard run (Stone Harrington kick), 3:17. Red Raiders 42–0. Drive: 8 plays, 80 yards, 3:38.

Fourth quarter

- No scoring plays

Statistics	OKST	TTU
First downs	9	21
Plays–yards	63–182	69–370
Rushes–yards	32–95	40–88
Passing yards	87	282
Passing: comp–att–int	14–31–0	19–29–0
Turnovers	2	2
Time of possession	28:44	31:16

Team	Category	Player	Statistics
Oklahoma State	Passing	Sam Jackson V	9/19, 48 yards
Oklahoma State	Rushing	Trent Howland	13 carries, 58 yards
Oklahoma State	Receiving	Gavin Freeman	6 receptions, 47 yards
Texas Tech	Passing	Mitch Griffis	9/13, 172 yards, TD
Texas Tech	Rushing	Cameron Dickey	13 carries, 47 yards, TD
Texas Tech	Receiving	Caleb Douglas	5 receptions, 98 yards, TD

=== At Kansas State ===
No. 13 Texas Tech Red Raiders (7–1) at Kansas State Wildcats (4–4) – Game summary

Quarter	1	2	3	4	Total
No. 13 Red Raiders	0	12	17	14	43
Wildcats	7	0	7	6	20

at Bill Snyder Family Football Stadium, Manhattan, Kansas

- Date: November 1
- Game time: 2:30 p.m. CDT
- Game weather: Cloudy, 48 °F (9 °C)
- Game attendance: 52,111
- Referee: Tuta Salaam
- TV announcers (Fox): Jason Benetti, Robert Griffin III, and Alexa Landestoy
- Box Score, Recap

Game information
First quarter
- KSU – Avery Johnson 46-yard run (Luis Rodriguez kick), 7:39. Wildcats 7–0. Drive: 5 plays, 80 yards, 2:53.

Second quarter

- TTU – Stone Harrington 29-yard field goal, 6:31. Wildcats 7–3. Drive: 12 plays, 79 yards, 5:32.
- TTU – Cameron Dickey 1-yard run (kick failed), 3:45. Red Raiders 9–7. Drive: 5 plays, 19 yards, 2:00.
- TTU – Stone Harrington 55-yard field goal, 0:00. Red Raiders 12–7. Drive: 7 plays, 11 yards, 1:52.

Third quarter

- TTU – J'Koby Williams 41-yard run (Stone Harrington kick), 12:54. Red Raiders 19–7. Drive: 3 plays, 49 yards, 0:53.
- KSU – Avery Johnson 18-yard run (Luis Rodriguez kick), 9:51. Red Raiders 19–14. Drive: 6 plays, 75 yards, 3:03.
- TTU – Stone Harrington 29-yard field goal, 6:35. Red Raiders 22–14. Drive: 7 plays, 63 yards, 3:16.
- TTU – Caleb Douglas 1-yard pass from Behren Morton (Stone Harrington kick), 1:23. Red Raiders 29–14. Drive: 7 plays, 74 yards, 3:07.

Fourth quarter

- KSU – Garrett Oakley 9-yard pass from Avery Johnson (pass failed), 12:44. Red Raiders 29–20. Drive: 8 plays, 75 yards, 3:39.
- TTU – John Curry 10-yard fumble return (Stone Harrington kick), 4:52. Red Raiders 36–20.
- TTU – Caleb Douglas 19-yard pass from Behren Morton (Stone Harrington kick), 2:54. Red Raiders 43–20. Drive: 3 plays, 24 yards, 1:34.

Statistics	TTU	KSU
First downs	18	11
Plays–yards	76–436	63–325
Rushes–yards	44–187	30–126
Passing yards	249	199
Passing: comp–att–int	21–32–1	16–33–2
Turnovers	2	5
Time of possession	33:24	26:36

Team	Category	Player	Statistics
Texas Tech	Passing	Behren Morton	21/32, 249 yards, 2 TD, INT
Texas Tech	Rushing	J'Koby Williams	17 carries, 135 yards, TD
Texas Tech	Receiving	Caleb Douglas	8 receptions, 82 yards, 2 TD
Kansas State	Passing	Avery Johnson	16/33, 199 yards, TD, 2 INT
Kansas State	Rushing	Avery Johnson	15 carries, 88 yards, 2 TD
Kansas State	Receiving	Garrett Oakley	5 receptions, 62 yards, TD

=== No. 7 BYU ===
No. 7 BYU Cougars (8–0) at No. 8 Texas Tech Red Raiders (8–1) – Game summary

Quarter	1	2	3	4	Total
No. 7 Cougars	0	0	0	7	7
No. 8 Red Raiders	10	3	6	10	29

at Jones AT&T Stadium, Lubbock, Texas

- Date: November 8
- Game time: 11:00 a.m. CST
- Game weather: Sunny, 69 °F (21 °C)
- Game attendance: 60,229
- Referee: Kevin Mar
- TV announcers (ABC): Chris Fowler, Kirk Herbstreit, and Holly Rowe
- Box score, Recap

Game information
First quarter
- TTU – Stone Harrington 47-yard field goal, 10:07. Red Raiders 3–0. Drive: 4 plays, -12 yards, 1:24.
- TTU – Caleb Douglas 9-yard pass from Behren Morton (Stone Harrington kick), 0:19. Red Raiders 10–0. Drive: 12 plays, 92 yards, 5:01.

Second quarter

- TTU – Stone Harrington 27-yard field goal, 8:08. Red Raiders 13–0. Drive: 8 plays, 59 yards, 2:25.

Third quarter

- TTU – Stone Harrington 39-yard field goal, 7:00. Red Raiders 16–0. Drive: 12 plays, 59 yards, 4:10.
- TTU – Stone Harrington 29-yard field goal, 3:41. Red Raiders 19–0. Drive: 6 plays, 11 yards, 2:03.

Fourth quarter

- TTU – Cameron Dickey 1-yard run (Stone Harrington kick), 10:46. Red Raiders 26–0. Drive: 9 plays, 80 yards, 4:04.
- BYU – Chase Roberts 6-yard pass from Bear Bachmeier (Will Ferrin kick), 7:35. Red Raiders 26–7. Drive: 8 plays, 57 yards, 3:11.
- TTU – Stone Harrington 34-yard field goal, 2:37. Red Raiders 29–7. Drive: 4 plays, 0 yards, 1:03.

Statistics	BYU	TTU
First downs	14	17
Plays–yards	65–255	75–368
Rushes–yards	27–67	43–149
Passing yards	188	219
Passing: comp–att–int	23–28–1	17–32–0
Turnovers	3	0
Time of possession	30:35	29:25

Team	Category	Player	Statistics
BYU	Passing	Bear Bachmeier	23/38, 188 yards, TD, INT
BYU	Rushing	LJ Martin	10 carries, 35 yards
BYU	Receiving	Chase Roberts	6 receptions, 61 yards, TD
Texas Tech	Passing	Behren Morton	17/32, 219 yards, TD
Texas Tech	Rushing	Cameron Dickey	23 carries, 121 yards, TD
Texas Tech	Receiving	Reggie Virgil	3 receptions, 54 yards

=== UCF ===
UCF Knights (4–5) at No. 6 Texas Tech Red Raiders (9–1) – Game summary

Quarter	1	2	3	4	Total
Knights	0	2	7	0	9
No. 6 Red Raiders	14	24	10	0	48

at Jones AT&T Stadium, Lubbock, Texas

- Date: November 15
- Game time: 2:30 p.m. CST
- Game weather: Sunny, 86 °F (30 °C), N 17 mph
- Game attendance: 60,229
- Referee: Henry Johns
- TV announcers (Fox): Tim Brando, Devin Gardner, and Josh Sims
- Box score, Recap

Game information
First quarter
- TTU – Cameron Dickey 12-yard run (Stone Harrington kick), 13:57. Red Raiders 7–0. Drive: 4 plays, 75 yards, 1:03.
- TTU – Jacob Rodriguez 2-yard run (Stone Harrington kick), 9:29. Red Raiders 14–0. Drive: 6 plays, 58 yards, 2:14.

Second quarter

- TTU – Reggie Virgil 5-yard run (Stone Harrington kick), 14:55. Red Raiders 21–0. Drive: 13 plays, 51 yards, 4:05.
- UCF – Penalty on Howard Sampson enforced in the end zone for a safety, 10:11. Red Raiders 21–2.
- TTU – Reggie Virgil 30-yard run (Stone Harrington kick), 4:42. Red Raiders 28–2. Drive: 4 plays, 44 yards, 1:49.
- TTU – Reggie Virgil 8-yard pass from Behren Morton (Stone Harrington kick), 2:58. Red Raiders 35–2. Drive: 3 plays, 23 yards, 1:02.
- TTU – Stone Harrington 45-yard field goal, 0:02. Red Raiders 38–2. Drive: 6 plays, 70 yards, 1:02.

Third quarter

- UCF – Dylan Wade 8-yard pass from Tayven Jackson (Noe Ruelas kick), 10:57. Red Raiders 38–9. Drive: 8 plays, 75 yards, 4:03.
- TTU – Stone Harrington 53-yard field goal, 9:13. Red Raiders 41–9. Drive: 5 plays, 31 yards, 1:38.
- TTU – Cameron Dickey 1-yard run (Stone Harrington kick), 3:10. Red Raiders 48–9. Drive: 8 plays, 44 yards, 2:45.

Fourth quarter

- No scoring plays.

Statistics	UCF	TTU
First downs	13	26
Plays–yards	62–230	71–499
Rushes–yards	29–52	35–205
Passing yards	178	294
Passing: comp–att–int	27–33–1	27–36–0
Turnovers	2	0
Time of possession	30:53	29:07

Team	Category	Player	Statistics
UCF	Passing	Tayven Jackson	27/33, 178 yards, TD, INT
UCF	Rushing	Jaden Nixon	15 carries, 32 yards
UCF	Receiving	Dylan Wade	6 receptions, 45 yards, TD
Texas Tech	Passing	Behren Morton	14/20, 149 yards, TD
Texas Tech	Rushing	Cameron Dickey	11 carries, 77 yards, 2 TD
Texas Tech	Receiving	Caleb Douglas	5 receptions, 90 yards

=== At West Virginia ===
No. 5 Texas Tech Red Raiders (10–1) at West Virginia Mountaineers (4–7) – Game summary

Quarter	1	2	3	4	Total
No. 5 Red Raiders	21	7	14	7	49
Mountaineers	0	0	0	0	0

at Milan Puskar Stadium, Morgantown, West Virginia

- Date: November 29
- Game time: 11:00 a.m. CST / 12:00 p.m. EST
- Game weather: Sunny, 35 °F (2 °C)
- Game attendance: 44,250
- Referee: Stephen Baron
- TV announcers (ESPN): Roy Philpott, Sam Acho and Taylor Davis
- Box Score, Recap

Game information
First quarter
- TTU – Jacob Rodriguez 1-yard run (Stone Harrington kick), 11:17. Red Raiders 7–0. Drive: 8 plays, 57 yards, 2:27.
- TTU – Cameron Dickey 4-yard pass from Behren Morton (Stone Harrington kick), 3:03. Red Raiders 14–0. Drive: 16 plays, 83 yards, 6:23.
- TTU – Caleb Douglas 19-yard pass from Behren Morton (Stone Harrington kick), 0:13. Red Raiders 21–0. Drive: 4 plays, 33 yards, 1:38.

Second quarter

- TTU – Caleb Douglas 4-yard pass from Behren Morton (Stone Harrington kick), 6:49. Red Raiders 28–0. Drive: 11 plays, 73 yards, 4:42.

Third quarter

- TTU – J'Koby Williams 9-yard run (Stone Harrington kick), 12:52. Red Raiders 35–0. Drive: 5 plays, 74 yards, 2:03.
- TTU – Micah Hudson 15-yard pass from Lloyd Jones III (Stone Harrington kick), 4:20. Red Raiders 42–0. Drive: 3 plays, 18 yards, 1:23.

Fourth quarter

- TTU – Micah Hudson 30-yard pass from Lloyd Jones III (Ian Hershey kick), 13:33. Red Raiders 49–0. Drive: 9 plays, 74 yards, 4:21.

Statistics	TTU	WVU
First downs	32	9
Plays–yards	94–572	54–180
Rushes–yards	54–188	22–37
Passing yards	384	143
Passing: comp–att–int	29–40–1	16–32–2
Turnovers	2	2
Time of possession	40:00	20:00

Team	Category	Player	Statistics
Texas Tech	Passing	Behren Morton	25/32, 310 yards, 3 TD
Texas Tech	Rushing	Cameron Dickey	12 carries, 79 yards
Texas Tech	Receiving	Caleb Douglas	5 receptions, 127 yards, 2 TD
West Virginia	Passing	Scotty Fox Jr.	13/23, 98 yards, INT
West Virginia	Rushing	Armoni Weaver	1 carry, 29 yards
West Virginia	Receiving	Jeff Weimer	6 receptions, 77 yards

=== Vs. No. 11 BYU (Big 12 Championship Game) ===
2025 Big 12 Championship Game
No. 11 BYU Cougars (11–1) vs. No. 4 Texas Tech Red Raiders (11–1) – Game summary

Quarter	1	2	3	4	Total
No. 11 Cougars	7	0	0	0	7
No. 4 Red Raiders	0	13	11	10	34

at AT&T Stadium, Arlington, Texas

- Date: December 6
- Game time: 11:00 a.m. CST
- Game weather: None (retractable roof closed)
- Game attendance: 85,519
- Referee: Kevin Mar
- TV announcers (ABC): Joe Tessitore, Jesse Palmer, Katie George and Kris Budden
- Box score, Recap

Game information
First quarter
- BYU – LJ Martin 10-yard run (Will Ferrin kick), 4:58. Cougars 7–0. Drive: 14 plays, 90 yards, 6:50.

Second quarter

- TTU – Stone Harrrington 23-yard field goal, 14:56. Cougars 7–3. Drive: 11 plays, 70 yards, 5:02.
- TTU – Coy Eakin 33-yard pass from Behren Morton (Stone Harrington kick), 10:42. Red Raiders 10–7. Drive: 7 plays, 61 yards, 2:34.
- TTU – Stone Harrington 40-yard field goal, 0:21. Red Raiders 13–7. Drive: 7 plays, 45 yards, 1:16.

Third quarter

- TTU – Cameron Dickey 11-yard run (Behren Morton pass to Terrance Carter Jr.), 3:21. Red Raiders 21–7. Drive: 1 play, 11 yards, 0:05.

Fourth quarter

- TTU – Stone Harrington 44-yard field goal, 12:49. Red Raiders 24–7. Drive: 4 plays, -2 yards, 2:00.
- TTU – Coy Eakin 28-yard pass from Behren Morton (Stone Harrington kick), 7:04. Red Raiders 31–7. Drive: 4 plays, 37 yards, 1:59.
- TTU – Stone Harrington 28-yard field goal, 4:39. Red Raiders 34–7. Drive: 5 plays, 28 yards, 2:14.

Statistics	BYU	TTU
First downs	14	19
Plays–yards	59–200	74–374
Rushes–yards	30–63	41–159
Passing yards	137	215
Passing: comp–att–int	17-29-2	20-33-0
Turnovers	4	0
Time of possession	28:06	31:54

Team	Category	Player	Statistics
BYU	Passing	Bear Bachmeier	16/27, 115 yards, 2 INT
BYU	Rushing	LJ Martin	19 carries, 76 yards, TD
BYU	Receiving	Parker Kingston	4 receptions, 44 yards
Texas Tech	Passing	Behren Morton	20/33, 215 yards, 2 TD
Texas Tech	Rushing	J'Koby Williams	15 carries, 80 yards
Texas Tech	Receiving	Reggie Virgil	8 receptions, 86 yards

=== Vs. No. 5 Oregon (Orange Bowl–CFP Quarterfinal) ===
CFP Quarterfinal at the Capital One Orange Bowl
No. 5 Oregon Ducks (12–1) vs. No. 4 Texas Tech Red Raiders (12–1) – Game summary

Quarter	1	2	3	4	Total
No. 5 Ducks	3	3	7	10	23
No. 4 Red Raiders	0	0	0	0	0

at Hard Rock Stadium, Miami Gardens, Florida

- Date: January 1, 2026
- Game time: 11:00 a.m. CST / 12:00 p.m. EST
- Game attendance: 65,021
- Referee: Jerry Magallanes
- TV announcers (ESPN): Joe Tessitore (play-by-play), Jesse Palmer (analyst), Katie George and Stormy Buonantony (sideline reporters)

Game information
First quarter
- ORE – Atticus Sappington 50-yard field goal, 10:41. Ducks 3–0. Drive: 10 plays, 43 yards, 4:19.

Second quarter

- ORE – Atticus Sappington 39-yard field goal, 1:33. Ducks 6–0. Drive: 4 plays, 9 yards, 0:56.

Third quarter

- ORE – Jordon Davison 6-yard run (Atticus Sappington kick), 11:20. Ducks 13–0. Drive: 1 play, 6 yards, 0:04.

Fourth quarter

- ORE – Atticus Sappington 43-yard field goal, 7:53. Ducks 16–0. Drive: 10 plays, 55 yards, 5:55.
- ORE – Jordon Davison 1-yard run (Atticus Sappington kick), 0:16. Ducks 23–0. Drive: 8 plays, 27 yards, 2:54.

Statistics	ORE	TTU
First downs	16	10
Plays–yards	81–309	62–215
Rushes–yards	47–64	30–78
Passing yards	245	137
Passing: comp–att–int	27–34–1	18–32–2
Turnovers	1	4
Time of possession	38:00	22:00

Team	Category	Player	Statistics
Oregon	Passing	Dante Moore	26/33, 234 yards, INT
Oregon	Rushing	Jordon Davison	15 carries, 42 yards, 2 TD
Oregon	Receiving	Jamari Johnson	4 receptions, 66 yards
Texas Tech	Passing	Behren Morton	18/32, 137 yards, 2 INT
Texas Tech	Rushing	J'Koby Williams	13 carries, 81 yards
Texas Tech	Receiving	Terrance Carter Jr.	9 receptions, 72 yards
