= Joyner =

Joyner may refer to:

== Places ==
- Joyner, Queensland, a suburb north of Brisbane, Australia
- Joyner, Tennessee, an unincorporated town in Morgan County, Tennessee, United States

== People ==
=== Given name or nickname ===
- Joyner Lucas, American rapper

=== Surname ===
- A. Jack Joyner, American horse trainer
- Al Joyner, American athlete
- Arthenia Joyner, American politician
- David Joyner (athletic director), American physician
- David Joyner (actor), American actor
- David Joyner (business executive), American president and CEO of CVS Health
- Edward Joyner, American basketball coach
- Florence Griffith Joyner, American athlete, wife of Al
- Jackie Joyner-Kersee (born 1962), American athlete, sister of Al
- Jackiem Joyner, American jazz musician
- Jah Joyner (born 2001), American football player
- Jo Joyner, English actress
- John Joyner, English rugby player
- Joyzelle Joyner, American actress
- Kitty Joyner (1916–1993), American electrical engineer
- Lamarcus Joyner, American football player
- Larry Joyner (born 1964), American football player
- Lionel Joyner (1932–2001), Canadian chess master
- Lisa Joyner, American TV host
- Marjorie Joyner, American inventor and businesswoman
- Michael Joyner, American anesthesiologist and physiologist
- Owen Joyner, American actor
- Pamela Joyner (born 1957/58), American art collector
- Quinten Joyner (born 2005), American football player
- Rick Joyner (born 1949), founder of MorningStar Ministries
- Sean Joyner, English cricket player
- Seth Joyner, American football player
- Simon Joyner, American singer-songwriter
- Tom Joyner, American TV and radio host
- Wally Joyner, American baseball coach

== Fictional people ==
- Simon Joyner (City Homicide), fictional character from the Australian drama series City Homicide

== See also ==
- Joiner (disambiguation)
