= Joiner (disambiguation) =

A joiner is a type of woodworker.

Joiner may also refer to:

- Joiner (surname)
- Joiner, Arkansas, a town in the United States
- Biscuit joiner, a woodworking tool
- A defector to the British side during the Second Boer War
- Joiners (photographic technique), a photo-collage technique
- A joiner is one of various typographic control characters
  - Zero-width joiner
  - Combining grapheme joiner

== See also ==
- Joinery
- Join (disambiguation)
- Joyner (disambiguation)
