= Joines =

Joines is a surname. Notable people with the surname include:

- Allen Joines (born 1947), American politician
- Jennifer Joines (born 1982), American volleyball player
- Kimberly Joines (born 1981), Canadian alpine skier
- Vernon Joines, American football player
- Gilbert Joines, (born 1964), American politician

== See also ==
- Joiner (surname)
