= Joey McGuire =

American football coach (born 1971)

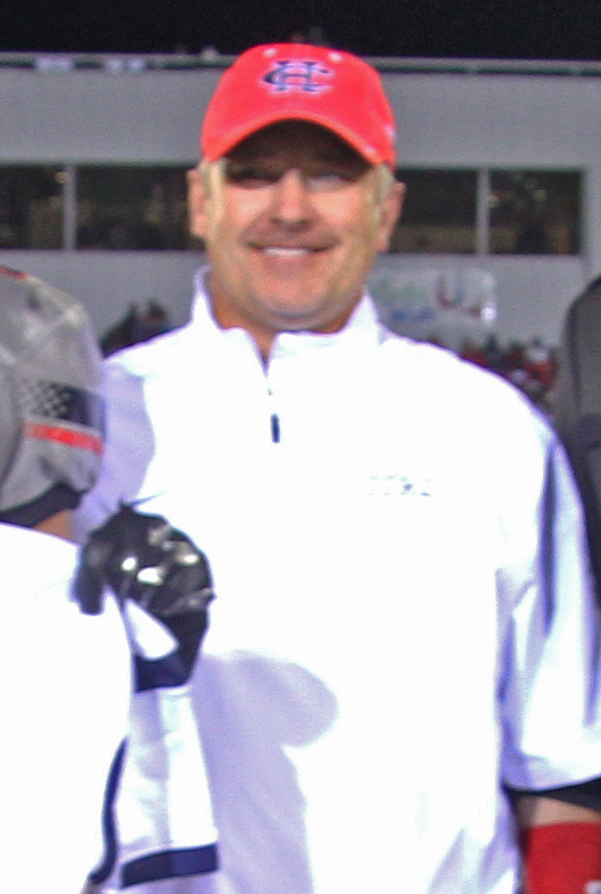
- McGuire as Cedar Hill High School Head Coach in 2014

Current position
- Title: Head coach
- Team: Texas Tech
- Conference: Big 12
- Record: 45–19

Biographical details
- Born: August 6, 1971 (age 55); Texarkana, Texas, U.S.
- Education: UT Arlington ('95)

Coaching career (HC unless noted)
- 1995–1996: Crowley HS (TX) (DL)
- 1997–2002: Cedar Hill HS (TX) (DB)
- 2003–2016: Cedar Hill HS (TX)
- 2017–2018: Baylor (TE)
- 2019: Baylor (AHC/DE)
- 2020–2021: Baylor (AHC/OLB)
- 2022–present: Texas Tech

Head coaching record
- Overall: 45–19 (college); 142–42 (high school)
- Bowls: 2–1
- Tournaments: 0–1

Accomplishments and honors

Championships
- Big 12 (2025)

Joe Newton McGuire (born August 6, 1971) is an American football coach. He is the head football coach at Texas Tech University, a position he has held since the 2022 season. McGuire previously served as the associate head coach and outside linebackers coach at Baylor University. Prior to Baylor, he was a head coach at the high school level in Texas, where he won a trio of state championships to go along with numerous bi-district and district titles.

== Coaching career ==
=== High school coaching ===
McGuire began his coaching career at his alma mater Crowley High School in Texas as the defensive line coach. He went on to coach at Cedar Hill High School as their secondary coach in 1997 under former Crowley coach Robert Woods before being promoted to the school's head coach in 2003. At Cedar Hill, McGuire took on a program that had not recorded a winning season in years and had never won a playoff game. As head coach from 2003 through 2016, McGuire went 141–42 and led the Longhorns to four state championship games, winning in 2006, 2013 and 2014 and finishing runner-up in 2012. His teams won seven district titles, nine bi-district championships, and appeared in the playoffs in 12 straight years.

=== Baylor ===
McGuire was hired as the tight ends coach at Baylor in 2017 under first-year head coach Matt Rhule. He was promoted to associate head coach in 2019 and reassigned to coach the defensive ends. He served as the program's interim head coach when Rhule left to accept the Carolina Panthers coaching position in 2020. After Dave Aranda was named Baylor's head coach on January 16, 2020, McGuire was retained as associate head coach and shifted to outside linebackers coach.

=== Texas Tech ===
McGuire was reported to have been scheduled to interview for the open head coaching position at Texas Tech in 2021.

McGuire was officially named the 17th head coach in Texas Tech program history on November 8, 2021.

==== 2022 season ====
In his first season as head coach of the Red Raiders, McGuire defeated both the Texas Longhorns and Oklahoma Sooners in the same season, a program first. The Red Raiders finished 4th in the Big 12, with McGuire overseeing Texas Tech’s first winning season in conference play since 2009. The Red Raiders finished 8–5 in his first season as head coach.

==== 2023 season ====
In his second year at Texas Tech, McGuire led his team to a (7–6) record after beating California in the 2023 Independence Bowl. The highlight win of the season for the Red Raiders was a victory at #16 Kansas on November 11, 16–13.

==== 2024 season ====
In his third season at TTU, McGuire's team finished (8–5) after losing to former Southwest Conference rival Arkansas in the 2024 Liberty Bowl, 39–26. Texas Tech's big win of the season came on November 2 at #11 Iowa State, a 23–22 victory over the Cyclones. After the regular season was completed, McGuire fired defensive coordinator Tim DeRuyter after the Red Raiders had the worst passing defense in the Big XII. McGuire hired Shiel Wood as his new DC. He gained some attention during a game against the Colorado Buffaloes. In the 4th quarter of the game with the Red Raiders trailing 31–20, during a targeting review and after the Texas Tech student section was seen throwing objects onto the field, McGuire grabbed a microphone and shouted at them to stop. This had happened during a trend throughout the season where fans from other schools threw trash onto the field in response to bad calls by the officials. The Red Raiders went on to lose the game 41–27, and Texas Tech was not fined for the incident.

==== 2025 season ====
McGuire and his staff signed the #1-ranked transfer portal class in the country, according to On3.com. Texas Tech was predicted to finish 2nd in the Big 12 prior to the start of the 2025 season, according to 247Sports.com. Texas Tech finished the 2025 regular season 11–1 and finished 1st in the Big 12 standings. TTU defeated BYU in the Big XII championship game, winning their first-ever Big XII title and improving to 12–1, the most wins in a single season in program history. It was the Red Raiders first conference crown since 1994. Tech was ranked #4 in the final College Football Playoff (CFP) poll, receiving a first-round bye. The team lost to #5 Oregon in the Orange Bowl on January 1, 2026 in the CFP quarter-finals with a final score of 23–0.

== Personal life ==
McGuire and his wife Debbie have a daughter, Raegan, and a son, Garret. Garret is a former quarterback at Baylor and former coaching assistant for the Carolina Panthers and Nebraska Cornhuskers. Garret is currently the running backs coach for the Texas Tech Red Raiders under his father. Growing up, McGuire was a fan of the Arkansas Razorbacks.

== Head coaching record ==
=== College ===
Year	Team	Overall	Conference	Standing	Bowl/playoffs	Coaches^{#}	AP^{°}
Texas Tech Red Raiders (Big 12 Conference) (2022–present)
2022	Texas Tech	8–5	5–4	4th	W Texas		
2023	Texas Tech	7–6	5–4	T–7th	W Independence		
2024	Texas Tech	8–5	6–3	T–5th	L Liberty		
2025	Texas Tech	12–2	8–1	1st	L Orange^{†}	7	7
2026	Texas Tech	10–1	7–1				
Texas Tech:		45–19	31–13				
Total:		45–19					
National championship Conference title Conference division title or championship game berth
^{†}Indicates CFP / New Years' Six bowl.; ^{#}Rankings from final Coaches Poll.
