= Cameron Dickey =

American football player

No. 8 – Texas Tech Red Raiders
- Position: Running back
- Class: Sophomore

Personal information
- Born: November 4, 2005 (age 21); Austin, Texas, U.S.
- Listed height: 5 ft 10 in (1.78 m)
- Listed weight: 215 lb (98 kg)

Career information
- High school: Crockett (Austin, Texas)
- College: Texas Tech (2024–present)

Awards and highlights
- First-team All-Big 12 (2025)
- Stats at ESPN

Cameron Dickey (born November 4, 2005) is an American college football running back for the Texas Tech Red Raiders.

== Early life ==
Dickey was born in Austin, Texas, to parents Stanley and Amanda Dickey, and has two siblings, Ciera and Caleb. Dickey attended Crockett High School in Austin, Texas, where he played quarterback. As a senior, he was the District 12-5A MVP after totaling 3,455 yards of total offense (1,595 passing, 1,860 rushing) with 50 touchdowns. For his career, he had 2,963 passing yards with 33 touchdowns and 4,065 rushing yards with 61 touchdowns. He also had 247 tackles and seven interceptions with three returned for a touchdown on defense in his career. Dickey committed to Texas Tech University to play college football.

== College career ==
Dickey played in 12 games his true freshman year at Texas Tech in 2024 as a backup to Tahj Brooks. He rushed 41 times for 225 yards and a touchdown. After projected starter Quinten Joyner suffered a season-ending injury before the season, Dickey took over as the starter to start the year. Against the Kansas Jayhawks he had 263 on 21 carries with two touchdowns.

=== College statistics ===
Year	Team	Games		Rushing				Receiving				Kick returns			
Year	Team	GP	GS	Att	Yds	Avg	TD	Rec	Yds	Avg	TD	Ret	Yds	Avg	TD
2024	Texas Tech	12	0	41	225	5.5	1	9	47	5.2	1	3	40	13.3	0
2025	Texas Tech	13	13	198	1,095	5.5	14	24	216	9.0	2	1	9	9.0	0
Career		25	13	239	1,320	5.5	15	33	263	8.0	3	4	49	12.3	0
