= Joiner (surname) =

Joiner is a surname of English origin. It is an occupational name for a maker of wooden furniture, derived from the Anglo-Norman French word joignour (Old French joigneor, from joinre ‘to join’, ‘to connect’, Latin iungere).

Notable people with the surname include:

- Alvin Joiner (born 1974), American rapper known as Xzibit
- Amber Joiner (born 1976), American politician
- Bill Joiner (1939–2017), Australian rules footballer
- Billy Joiner (1938–2019), American boxer
- Carl Joiner (1924–2000), American racing driver
- Charles Wycliffe Joiner (1916–2017), American judge
- Charlie Joiner (born 1947), American football player, Hall of Famer, and coach
- Columbus Marion Joiner (1860–1947), American politician and oilman
- Craig Joiner (born 1974), Scottish rugby union player
- David Joiner (born 1958), American game programmer
- Franklin Joiner (1887–1960), American priest
- Fred Joiner (1929–2014), American politician
- Jarkel Joiner (born 1999), American basketball player
- Joe Joiner (1888–1932), American politician
- John Joiner (1934–2021), Australian rules footballer
- Lemuel W. Joiner (1810–1886), American farmer, politician and pioneer
- Michael Joiner (born 1981), American basketball player and coach
- Richard Joiner (1918–1999), American clarinet player
- Robert Joiner (1841–1920), American politician
- Roy Joiner (1906–1989), American baseball player
- Rusty Joiner (born 1972), American model
- Scott Joiner (born 1982), American singer and composer
- Thomas Joiner (born 1965), American psychologist
- Tim Joiner (1961–2023), American football player

== See also ==
- Joyner (disambiguation)
