= Micah Hudson =

American football player

No. 1 – Texas Tech Red Raiders
- Position: Wide receiver
- Class: Junior

Personal information
- Listed height: 6 ft 0 in (1.83 m)
- Listed weight: 200 lb (91 kg)

Career information
- High school: Lake Belton (Belton, Texas)
- College: Texas Tech (2024–present)
- Stats at ESPN

Micah Hudson is an American college football wide receiver who currently plays for the Texas Tech Red Raiders.

== Early life ==
Hudson grew up in Temple, Texas and attended Lake Belton High School. He had 70 catches for 1,353 yards and 18 touchdowns as a senior. After the season Hudson played in the 2024 All-American Bowl. He finished his high school career with 5,111 yards of total offense and 48 total touchdowns.

Hudson was rated a five-star recruit and committed to play college football at Texas Tech over offers from Texas, Texas A&M, and Alabama. He is the highest-rated recruit in Texas Tech history.

== College career ==
=== Texas Tech ===
Hudson joined the Texas Tech Red Raiders as an early enrollee in January 2024, but missed the team's spring practices due to a right knee injury. On December 1, Hudson announced his intentions to enter the transfer portal.

=== Texas A&M ===
On December 15, 2024, Hudson announced that he would transfer to Texas A&M. On January 16, 2025, it was announced that Hudson would be temporarily stepping away from the team for an unknown amount of time.

On April 16, 2025, it was announced that Hudson had Left Texas A&M and re-entered the transfer portal.

=== Return to Texas Tech ===
On April 27, 2025, Hudson announced that he would be returning to Texas Tech.

=== Statistics ===
Season	Team	GP	Receiving			
Season	Team	GP	Rec	Yds	Avg	TD
2024	Texas Tech	8	8	123	15.4	0
2025	Texas Tech	12	8	112	14.0	2
Career		20	16	235	14.7	2
