= Mitch Griffis =

American football quarterback (born 2001)

No. 12 – East Carolina Pirates
- Position: Quarterback
- Class: Redshirt Senior

Personal information
- Born: September 9, 2001 (age 25)
- Listed height: 6 ft 0 in (1.83 m)
- Listed weight: 204 lb (93 kg)

Career information
- High school: Broad Run (Ashburn, Virginia)
- College: Wake Forest (2020–2023); Texas Tech (2025); East Carolina (2026–present)
- Stats at ESPN

Mitchell Griffis (born September 9, 2001) is an American college football quarterback for the East Carolina Pirates. He previously played for the Wake Forest Demon Deacons and Texas Tech Red Raiders.

== Early life ==
Griffis attended Broad Run High School in Ashburn, Virginia. As a senior, he completed 192 of 278 pass attempts for 2,647 passing yards and 29 touchdowns to three interceptions and rushed for 411 yards. Coming out of high school Griffis was rated as a three-star recruit and the number 40 quarterback in the class. He committed to play college football at Wake Forest University over other schools such as Louisville, Maryland, North Carolina, and West Virginia.

== College career ==
In the 2020 season opener, Griffis threw his first career touchdown pass to Taylor Morin against Clemson. He finished the COVID shortened 2020 season going four for 13 on passing attempts for 56 yards and a touchdown. In 2021, Griffis took a redshirt. He got his first start in the 2022 season opener, replacing injured starter Sam Hartman. Griffis completed 21 of 29 pass attempts for 288 yards and three touchdowns in a 44–10 win over VMI. Griffis finished the 2022 season completing 29 of 41 pass attempts for 348 yards and five touchdowns with an interception, while also rushing for 14 yards. He opened the 2023 season as Wake Forest's starting quarterback. In week zero of the 2023 season, Griffis completed 19 of 30 pass attempts for 329 yards and three touchdowns with an interception in a win over Elon. The following week he went 17 for 26 on passing attempts for 196 yards and two touchdowns in a win over Vanderbilt. Griffis entered the transfer portal on November 28, 2023.

On December 15, 2023, Griffis announced that he would be transferring to Marshall.

However, on June 12, 2024, Griffis announced that he would be stepping away from football. Later in November, Griffis announced that he would returning to football with one year of eligibility remaining; on December 17, 2024, Griffis announced that he was transferring to Texas Tech.

=== Statistics ===
Season	Team	Games			Passing								Rushing			
Season	Team	GP	GS	Record	Cmp	Att	Pct	Yds	Y/A	TD	Int	Rtg	Att	Yds	Avg	TD
2020	Wake Forest	4	0	—	4	13	30.8	56	4.3	1	0	92.3	2	−1	−0.5	0
2021	Wake Forest	4	0	—	0	2	0.0	0	0.0	0	0	0.0	0	0	0.0	0
2022	Wake Forest	6	1	1–0	29	41	70.7	348	8.5	5	1	177.4	15	14	0.9	0
2023	Wake Forest	9	9	3–6	124	207	59.9	1,553	7.5	9	7	130.5	106	128	1.2	2
2024	Did not play															
2025	Texas Tech	6	0	—	26	36	72.2	357	9.9	2	0	173.9	14	29	2.1	1
Career		29	10	4–6	183	299	61.2	2,314	7.7	17	8	139.6	137	170	1.2	3
