= Michael Joyner =

American physiologist

- Born: Michael Joseph Joyner
- Education: University of Arizona
- Known for: Exercise physiology
- Awards: Citation Award from the American College of Sports Medicine (2009) Walter B. Cannon Award from the American Physiological Society (2013) Honor Award from the American College of Sports Medicine (2023) Honor Award from the Environmental & Exercise Physiology Section of the American Physiological Society (2023)
- Scientific career
- Fields: Anesthesiology; Physiology
- Workplaces: Mayo Clinic

Michael Joseph Joyner is an American anesthesiologist and physiologist who researches exercise physiology. During the COVID-19 Pandemic, he repurposed his lab and led the US Convalescent Plasma Program.

== Early life and education ==
Joyner was born in Lafayette, Louisiana in 1958. His family moved to Tucson, Arizona, in 1961, where his father (Conrad) was a faculty member at the University of Arizona and a local politician. Joyner graduated from Rincon High School in 1976 and attended the University of Arizona for both his undergraduate and medical degrees. During his time as an undergraduate, he was a distance runner on the track and cross-country teams with a marathon best time of 2:25:44. His interest in physiology and biomedical research began in 1977 when he was recruited to participate as a subject in a study on lactic acid and distance running performance. After medical school, he received residency training in anesthesiology at the Mayo Clinic. Formative mentors and collaborators include professors Eddie Coyle, Jack Wilmore, John Holloszy, Douglas Stuart, Doug Seals, Roger Enoka, Jim Hagberg, Marlys Witte, Jerry Dempsey, Kai Rehder, and John Shepherd.

== Career ==
Joyner is currently the Frank R. and Shari Caywood Professor of Anesthesiology at the Mayo Clinic, where his laboratory has been funded continuously by the National Institutes of Health since 1993. He was deputy director and Associate Dean for Research at the Mayo Clinic from 2005 to 2010. He was named a Distinguished Investigator by his colleagues at the Mayo Clinic in 2010, and he received the American Physiological Society’s Walter B. Cannon Award in 2013. A fellow of the American College of Sports Medicine (ACSM), he delivered the Joseph B. Wolffe Memorial Lecture at the ACSM's 2004 annual meeting, received the ACSM Citation Award in 2009, and delivered the opening keynote at their 2018 Conference on Integrative Physiology of Exercise.

In 2021, his convalescent plasma team was awarded a BARDA Medal for their contributions during the pandemic. In 2023, Joyner received the Honor Award from the EEP section of the American Physiological Society; he also received the Honor Award from the American College of Sports Medicine. In addition to his work on exercise physiology and human performance, Joyner is interested in sex differences and blood pressure regulation, thermoregulation, hypoxia, blood loss, passive immunity, and pandemic preparedness. More than 25 of Joyner’s research fellows now direct independent research programs at major research institutions.

An outspoken critic of reductionism in science and medicine, he has been called "one of the world's most widely cited experts on the limits of human performance." Joyner is also a fierce defender of academic freedom and the ability of scientists to share their opinions and knowledge without fear in the public square.
