= Bill Joiner =

Australian rules footballer

Personal information
- Full name: William Joseph Joiner
- Born: 29 August 1939
- Died: 4 September 2017 (aged 78); Mandurah, Western Australia
- Original team: Tooronga
- Height: 200 cm (6 ft 7 in)
- Weight: 97 kg (214 lb)

Playing career^{1}
Years	Club	Games (Goals)
1961–62	Hawthorn	13 (4)
- ^{1} Playing statistics correct to the end of 1962.

Bill Joiner (29 August 1939 – 4 September 2017) was an Australian rules footballer who played with Hawthorn in the Victorian Football League (VFL).
