= Terrance Carter Jr. =

American football tight end

No. 7 – Texas Tech Red Raiders
- Position: Tight end
- Class: Redshirt Senior

Personal information
- Born: Killeen, Texas, U.S.
- Listed height: 6 ft 2 in (1.88 m)
- Listed weight: 245 lb (111 kg)

Career information
- High school: Harker Heights (Harker Heights, Texas)
- College: Louisiana (2022–2024); Texas Tech (2025–present)

Awards and highlights
- First-team All-Sun Belt (2024); Second-team All-Big 12 (2025)
- Stats at ESPN

Terrance Carter Jr. is an American college football tight end for the Texas Tech Red Raiders. He previously played for the Louisiana Ragin' Cajuns.

== Early life ==
Carter Jr. attended Harker Heights High School in Harker Heights, Texas, and committed to play college football for the Louisiana Ragin' Cajuns over Arkansas State.

== College career ==
=== Louisiana ===
As a freshman in 2022, Carter Jr. took a redshirt. In 2023, he hauled in 28 receptions for 255 yards and three touchdowns. In week 8 of the 2024 season, Carter Jr. made seven catches for 149 yards and a touchdown in a 34-24 victory over Coastal Carolina. During the 2024 season, he recorded 48 catches for 689 yards and four touchdowns. After the 2024 season, Carter Jr. entered his name into the NCAA transfer portal.

=== Texas Tech ===
Carter Jr. transferred to play for the Texas Tech Red Raiders. He is expected to be the Red Raider's starting tight end.

=== College statistics ===
Season	Team	GP	Receiving				Rushing			
Season	Team	GP	Rec	Yds	Avg	TD	Att	Yds	Avg	TD
2022	Louisiana-Lafayette	1	0	0	0.0	0	0	0	0.0	0
2023	Louisiana-Lafayette	12	28	255	9.1	3	0	0	0.0	0
2024	Louisiana-Lafayette	13	48	689	14.4	4	0	0	0.0	0
2025	Texas Tech	12	46	552	12.0	5	2	24	12.0	0
Career		38	122	1,496	12.3	12	2	24	12.0	0
