= Bryce Butler =

Canadian gridiron football player

No. 92 – Texas Tech Red Raiders
- Position: Defensive lineman
- Class: Redshirt Senior

Personal information
- Born: Toronto, Ontario, Canada
- Listed height: 6 ft 4 in (1.93 m)
- Listed weight: 320 lb (145 kg)

Career information
- High school: St. Thomas More (Oakdale, Connecticut)
- College: Garden City (2022–2023); Washington (2024–2025); Texas Tech (2026–present)

Awards and highlights
- 2× Second-team All-KJCCC (2022, 2023)
- Stats at ESPN

Bryce Butler is a Canadian football defensive lineman for the Texas Tech Red Raiders. He previously played for the Washington Huskies and the Garden City Broncbusters.

== Early life ==
Butler attended St. Thomas More School in Oakdale, Connecticut where he played both offensive and defensive line.

== College career ==
Butler began his college football career at Garden City Community College, where he played for two years. He had 59 tackles, including 25 for loss, eight sacks, three pass deflections and one forced fumble in 20 games. Butler was twice named to the second-team all-KJCCC team.

Butler initially signed a letter of intent to play at Arizona for the 2024 season but flipped to Washington after Jedd Fisch became the head coach there. He registered five tackles in only three games, which allowed him to redshirt that year. The following season, Butler played in 12 games and made 19 tackles, two sacks and had a fumble recovery.

On December 16, 2025, Butler entered the transfer portal. On January 5, 2026, he committed to Texas Tech.
