= Garret McGuire =

American football player and coach

Current position
- Title: Running backs coach
- Team: Texas Tech
- Conference: Big 12

Biographical details
- Education: Baylor University (2020)

Playing career
- 2017–2020: Baylor
- Position: Quarterback

Coaching career (HC unless noted)
- 2021: Carolina Panthers (CA)
- 2022: Carolina Panthers (OA)
- 2023–2024: Nebraska (WR)
- 2025–present: Texas Tech (RB)

Garret McGuire is an American football coach who is currently the running backs coach for the Texas Tech Red Raiders.

== Playing career ==
Coming out of high school, McGuire decided to walk-on to play for the Baylor Bears. In McGuire's career with Baylor he rushed twice for eight yards. During his time at Baylor, McGuire was named Academic All-Big 12 twice.

== Coaching career ==
McGuire got his first coaching job in 2021 as a coaching assistant with the Carolina Panthers. In 2022, McGuire became an offensive assistant for the Panthers. In 2023, McGuire would be hired by the Nebraska Cornhuskers to coach the team's wide receivers.

Prior to the 2025 season, McGuire became running backs coach at Texas Tech.

== Personal life ==
McGuire is the son of Texas Tech head football coach Joey McGuire.
