= Sean Joyner =

English cricketer (born 1968)

Personal information
- Full name: Sean Graham Joyner
- Born: 2 March 1968 (age 58); Banbury, Oxfordshire, England
- Batting: Right-handed
- Bowling: Right-arm fast-medium

Domestic team information
- Years: Team
- 1992–1996: Oxfordshire

Career statistics
Competition	List A
Matches	4
Runs scored	11
Batting average	3.66
100s/50s	–/–
Top score	11
Balls bowled	228
Wickets	1
Bowling average	221.00
5 wickets in innings	–
10 wickets in match	–
Best bowling	1/48
Catches/stumpings	1/–
- Source: Cricinfo, 20 May 2011

Sean Graham Joyner (born 2 March 1968) is an English former cricketer. Joyner was a right-handed batsman who bowled right-arm fast-medium. He was born in Banbury, Oxfordshire.

Joyner made his debut for Oxfordshire in the 1992 Minor Counties Championship against Wiltshire. Joyner played Minor counties cricket for Oxfordshire from 1992 to 1995, which included 17 Minor Counties Championship matches and 2 MCCA Knockout Trophy matches. He made his List A debut against Lancashire in the 1992 NatWest Trophy. He played 3 further List A matches, the last coming against Lancashire in the 1996 NatWest Trophy. In his 4 List A matches, he scored 11 runs at a batting average of 3.66, with a high score of 11. With the ball, he took a single wicket at a cost of 221 runs, with best figures of 1/48.

He has previously played for the Gloucestershire Second XI and the Northamptonshire Second XI.
