= John Curry (American football) =

American football player (born 2005)

No. 6 – Texas Tech Red Raiders
- Position: Linebacker
- Class: Redshirt Junior

Personal information
- Born: April 8, 2005 (age 21)
- Listed height: 6 ft 2 in (1.88 m)
- Listed weight: 235 lb (107 kg)

Career information
- High school: Coronado (Lubbock, Texas)
- College: Texas Tech (2023–present)
- Stats at ESPN

John Daniel Curry (born April 8, 2005) is an American football linebacker for the Texas Tech Red Raiders.

== Early life ==
Curry attended Coronado High School located in Lubbock, Texas. Coming out of high school, he committed to play college football for the Texas Tech Red Raiders.

== College career ==
In his first collegiate season in 2023, he used the season to redshirt after appearing in five games. During the 2024 season, Curry recorded 35 tackles and an interception. Heading into the 2025 season, he transitioned into a starting hybrid linebacker position for the Red Raiders defense. In week ten of the 2025 season, Curry recovered a fumble which he returned for a touchdown in a victory over Kansas State.

== Personal life ==
Curry's grandfather is late NFL offensive lineman, John Ayers.
