= Shiel Wood =

American football player and coach (born 1982)

Current position
- Title: Defensive coordinator
- Team: Texas Tech
- Conference: Big 12

Biographical details
- Born: August 26, 1982 (age 44); Spartanburg, South Carolina, U.S.
- Education: Wofford (2007)

Playing career
- 2001–2005: Wofford
- Position: Wide receiver

Coaching career (HC unless noted)
- 2006: Woodruff HS (SC) (assistant)
- 2007–2010: Wofford (WR)
- 2011–2012: Wofford (S)
- 2016: Wofford (S)
- 2017: Wofford (DC/S)
- 2018: Georgia Tech (S)
- 2019: Georgia State (ILB/STC)
- 2020: Army (co-DC/ILB)
- 2021: Army (co-DC/S)
- 2022: Troy (DC/S)
- 2023: Tulane (DC/LB)
- 2024: Houston (DC)
- 2025–present: Texas Tech (DC)

David Shiel Wood Jr. (born August 26, 1982) is an American football coach who is the defensive coordinator for the Texas Tech Red Raiders.

== Early life and playing career ==
Wood attended Spartanburg High School in Spartanburg, South Carolina, where he played football, basketball, and ran track. He was an all-area and all-academic selection while catching 46 passes for 538 yards and five touchdowns as a senior. He also lettered in track and basketball.

Wood played wide receiver at Wofford from 2001 to 2005 and was the leading receiver on the Terriers’ 2003 squad that won the SoCon championship and advanced to the NCAA Division I-AA semifinals.

== Coaching career ==
=== Woodruff High School ===
Wood began coaching in 2006 at Woodruff High School, where he helped lead the Wolverines to a 9–3 record, regional championship and state playoff berth.

=== Wofford ===
Wood spent a total of eight seasons as an assistant coach at Wofford. He served as the wide receivers coach from 2007-2010 and coached two student-athletes that went on to play in the National Football League, including former Carolina Panthers receiver Brenton Bersin.

In 2011, Wood moved to the defensive side of the ball where he served as the safeties coach for the next two years before stepping away from coaching to raise his two daughters.

In 2016, Wood returned to the Wofford coaching staff as a safeties coach and also served as the recruiting coordinator. The next year, Wood also took on the role of defensive coordinator. As Wofford's defensive coordinator, Wood directed a unit that ranked second in the Southern Conference and 26th in NCAA Division I FCS in total defense in 2017, allowing just 326.7 yards per game. The defensive effort helped lead Wofford to a 10–3 overall record, the outright SoCon championship (7–1 in league play) and an FCS quarterfinal appearance, where it fell to eventual national champion North Dakota State.

In all, Wofford won four SoCon titles and advanced to the FCS playoffs seven times in Wood's eight seasons on the Terriers’ staff.

=== Georgia Tech ===
On January 12, 2018, Wood joined Georgia Tech's coaching staff as a safeties coach. He helped them to an appearance in the 2018 Quick Lane Bowl.

=== Georgia State ===
Wood was named Georgia State's inside linebackers coach and special teams coordinator in January 2019, and helped lead them to a 7–6 record and an Arizona Bowl appearance.

=== Army ===
In 2020, Wood was hired as the co-defensive coordinator for the Army Black Knights. In addition to his co-defensive coordinator duties with the Black Knights, Wood coached the Army inside linebackers in 2020 before transitioning to coaching the safeties in 2021.

=== Troy ===
Wood was hired as Troy's defensive coordinator and safeties coach in 2022. In his lone year there, the Trojans defense was ranked eighth nationally in points allowed and helped the team compile a 12–2 record, highlighted by a Sun Belt Conference championship and win in the 2022 Cure Bowl over UTSA.

=== Tulane ===
Following a season at Troy, Wood was hired to serve as the linebackers coach and defensive coordinator for the Tulane Green Wave. He helped lead them to an 11–2 record, capped off by an appearance in the 2023 Military Bowl. As a result of his performance, Wood was nominated for the Broyles Award, though he did not win it.

== Personal life ==
Wood met his wife Bernadette, a soccer student-athlete, at Wofford. They married in June 2010. The couple have two daughters, Fay and Grace. From 2013–2015, Wood chose to leave coaching to be a stay-at-home dad while his wife began her medical residency.

Wood served as camp director for the Mike Ayers Football Camps for five years.
