= Quinten Joyner =

American football player (born 2005)

No. 0 – Texas Tech Red Raiders
- Position: Running back
- Class: Redshirt Junior

Personal information
- Born: March 3, 2005 (age 21); Austin, Texas, U.S.
- Listed height: 5 ft 11 in (1.80 m)
- Listed weight: 220 lb (100 kg)

Career information
- High school: Manor (Manor, Texas)
- College: USC (2023–2024); Texas Tech (2025–present)
- Stats at ESPN

Quinten Joyner (born March 3, 2005) is an American college football running back for the Texas Tech Red Raiders. He previously played for the USC Trojans.

== Early life ==
Joyner was born in Austin, Texas, and grew up in Paige. He grew up competing in football, basketball, baseball and track and field, and participated in each of those sports at Manor High School in Manor, Texas. As a junior for the football team, he ran for 2,494 yards and 31 touchdowns. For his performance, he was named first-team 5A all-state and the District 11-5A-I most valuable player. He then ran for 1,794 yards and 25 touchdowns as a senior. He was named first-team all-district and was invited to the All-American Bowl and the Polynesian Bowl. He committed to play college football for the USC Trojans.

== College career ==
Joyner redshirted as a true freshman for USC in 2023. He ran 18 times for 125 yards during the season, scoring a 47-yard touchdown against Nebraska. In 2024, he ran 63 times for 478 yards, scoring three rushing touchdowns while also catching a touchdown pass. After the 2024 season, Joyner entered the NCAA transfer portal and transferred to the Texas Tech Red Raiders for his redshirt-sophomore season in 2025.
