= 2025 Sam Houston Bearkats football team =

American college football season

2025 Sam Houston Bearkats football
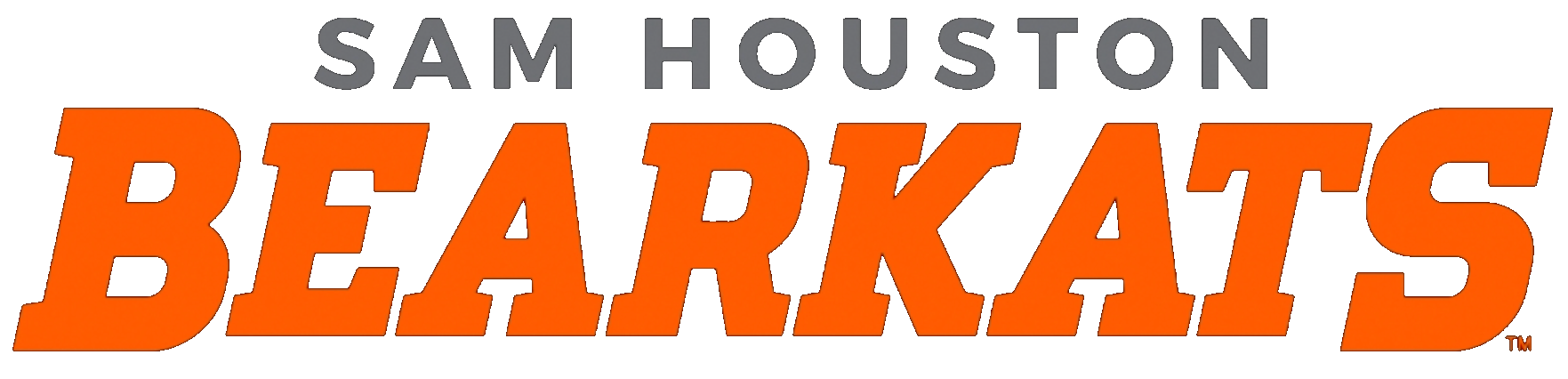
- Conference: Conference USA
- Record: 2–10 (1–7 CUSA)
- Head coach: Phil Longo (1st season)
- Offensive coordinator: Zack Patterson (1st season)
- Offensive scheme: Air raid
- Defensive coordinator: Freddie Aughtry-Lindsay (1st season)
- Base defense: 3–3–5
- Home stadium: Shell Energy Stadium

2025 Conference USA football standings
	Conf.			Overall
Team	W		L	W		L
Kennesaw State y$	7	–	1	10	–	4
Jacksonville State y	7	–	1	9	–	5
Western Kentucky	6	–	2	9	–	4
Louisiana Tech	5	–	3	8	–	5
FIU	5	–	3	7	–	6
Missouri State	5	–	3	7	–	6
Delaware	4	–	4	7	–	6
Liberty	3	–	5	4	–	8
New Mexico State	2	–	6	4	–	8
Middle Tennessee	2	–	6	3	–	9
Sam Houston	1	–	7	2	–	10
UTEP	1	–	7	2	–	10
Championship: Kennesaw State 19, Jacksonville State 15
$ – Conference champion; y – Championship game participant

The 2025 Sam Houston Bearkats football team represented Sam Houston State University in Conference USA (CUSA) during the 2025 NCAA Division I FBS football season. The Bearkats were led by first-year head coach Phil Longo. Due to renovations at Bowers Stadium during the 2025 season, the team played its home games at Shell Energy Stadium located in Houston, Texas.

== Schedule ==
Date	Time	Opponent	Site	TV	Result	Attendance
August 23	6:00 p.m.	at Western Kentucky	Houchens Industries–L. T. Smith Stadium; Bowling Green, KY	CBSSN	L 24–41	15,312
August 29	8:30 p.m.	UNLV*	Shell Energy Stadium; Houston, TX	CBSSN	L 21–38	5,837
September 6	11:00 p.m.	at Hawaii*	Clarence T. C. Ching Athletics Complex; Honolulu, HI	Spectrum Sports	L 20–37	11,625
September 20	7:00 p.m.	at No. 8 Texas*	Darrell K Royal–Texas Memorial Stadium; Austin, TX	SECN+/ESPN+	L 0–55	103,003
October 2	8:00 p.m.	at New Mexico State	Aggie Memorial Stadium; Las Cruces, NM	CBSSN	L 10–37	9,089
October 9	7:00 p.m.	Jacksonville State^{†}	Shell Energy Stadium; Houston, TX	CBSSN	L 27–29	5,419
October 15	6:00 p.m.	UTEP	Shell Energy Stadium; Houston, TX	CBSSN	L 17–35	4,657
October 31	7:00 p.m.	at Louisiana Tech	Joe Aillet Stadium; Ruston, LA	CBSSN	L 14–55	17,841
November 8	9:00 p.m.	at Oregon State*	Reser Stadium; Corvallis, OR	The CW	W 21–17	31,626
November 15	6:00 p.m.	Delaware	Shell Energy Stadium; Houston, TX	ESPN+	W 26–23	3,713
November 22	2:00 p.m.	at Middle Tennessee	Johnny "Red" Floyd Stadium; Murfreesboro, TN	ESPN+	L 17–31	7,605
November 29	12:00 p.m.	FIU	Shell Energy Stadium; Houston, TX	ESPN+	L 16–56	4,237
*Non-conference game; ^{†}Homecoming; Rankings from AP Poll - Released prior to game; All times are in Central time

== Game summaries ==
=== at Western Kentucky ===
Game One – Sam Houston Bearkats (0–0) at Western Kentucky Hilltoppers (0–0) – Game summary

Quarter	1	2	3	4	Total
Bearkats	3	7	14	0	24
Hilltoppers	7	13	14	7	41

at Houchens Industries–L. T. Smith Stadium • Bowling Green, Kentucky

- Date: August 23
- Game time: 6:00 p.m. CDT
- Game weather: Sunny, 84 °F (29 °C)
- Game attendance: 15,312
- Referee: Ron Hudson
- TV announcers (CBSSN): Chris Lewis (play-by-play), Robert Turbin (analyst), and Lauren Green (sideline reporter)
- Box score, Recap

Game information

First quarter

- WKU – Matthew Henry 26-yard pass from Maverick McIvor (John Cannon kick), 8:31. Hilltoppers 7–0. Drive: 9 plays, 87 yards, 2:31.
- SHSU – R. J. Lopez 40-yard field goal, 4:32. Hilltoppers 7–3. Drive: 4 plays, 3 yards, 1:56.

Second quarter

- SHSU – Hunter Watson 55-yard run (R. J. Lopez kick), 12:24. Bearkats 10–7. Drive: 2 plays, 62 yards, 0:31.
- WKU – La'Vell Wright 1-yard run (John Cannon kick), 7:06. Hilltoppers 14–10. Drive: 13 plays, 75 yards, 5:18.
- WKU – John Cannon 49-yard field goal, 4:57. Hilltoppers 17–10. Drive: 4 plays, 4 yards, 0:56.
- WKU – John Cannon 42-yard field goal, 0:24. Hilltoppers 20–10. Drive: 11 plays, 38 yards, 2:26.

Third quarter

- SHSU – Alton McCaskill 2-yard run (R. J. Lopez kick), 13:29. Hilltoppers 20–17. Drive: 5 plays, 75 yards, 1:31.
- SHSU – JaMair Diaz 43-yard fumble return (R. J. Lopez kick), 11:58. Bearkats 24–20.
- WKU – K. D. Hutchinson 9-yard pass from Maverick McIvor (John Cannon kick), 8:10. Hilltoppers 27–24. Drive: 9 plays, 87 yards, 3:41.
- WKU – Marvis Parrish 22-yard pass from Maverick McIvor (John Cannon kick), 4:47. Hilltoppers 34–24. Drive: 4 plays, 87 yards, 1:20.

Fourth quarter

- WKU – Maverick McIvor 4-yard run (John Cannon kick), 10:17. Hilltoppers 41–24. Drive: 6 plays, 81 yards, 2:17.

Statistics	SHSU	WKU
First downs	14	26
Plays–yards	61–382	86–506
Rushes–yards	31–173	35–105
Passing yards	209	401
Passing: Comp–Att–Int	19-30-1	33-51-0
Turnovers	1	2
Time of possession	27:04	32:56

Team	Category	Player	Statistics
Sam Houston	Passing	Hunter Watson	19/30, 209 yards, INT
Sam Houston	Rushing	Hunter Watson	14 carries, 91 yards, TD
Sam Houston	Receiving	Elijah Green	7 receptions, 61 yards
Western Kentucky	Passing	Maverick McIvor	33/51, 401 yards, 3 TD
Western Kentucky	Rushing	Marvis Parrish	12 carries, 52 yards
Western Kentucky	Receiving	Matthew Henry	7 receptions, 148 yards, TD

=== vs. UNLV ===
Game Two – UNLV Rebels (1–0) at Sam Houston Bearkats (0–1) – Game summary

Quarter	1	2	3	4	Total
Rebels	14	10	7	7	38
Bearkats	7	0	0	14	21

at Shell Energy Stadium • Houston, Texas

- Date: August 29
- Game time: 8:30 p.m. CDT
- Game attendance: 5,837
- Referee: Rodney Burnette
- TV announcers (CBSSN): Rich Waltz (play-by-play), Robert Turbin (analyst), and Tiffany Blackmon (sideline)
- Box score, Recap

Game information

First quarter

- UNLV – Jaden Bradley 43-yard pass from Anthony Colandrea (Ramon Villela kick), 12:19. Rebels 7–0. Drive: 5 plays, 68 yards, 2:33.
- SHSU – Hunter Watson 6-yard run (RJ Lopez kick), 8:42. Tied 7–7. Drive: 12 plays, 75 yards, 3:37.
- UNLV – DeAngelo Irvin Jr. 3-yard pass from Anthony Colandrea (Ramon Villela kick), 0:32. Rebels 14–7. Drive: 13 plays, 75 yards, 8:10.

Second quarter

- UNLV – Ramon Villela 29-yard field goal, 9:41. Rebels 17–7. Drive: 12 plays, 70 yards, 5:08.
- UNLV – Aaamaris Brown 52-yard interception return (Ramon Villela kick), 7:15. Rebels 24–7.

Third quarter

- UNLV – Jai'Den Thomas 3-yard run (Ramon Villela kick), 11:22. Rebels 31–7. Drive: 5 plays, 67 yards, 1:59.

Fourth quarter

- SHSU – Landan Brown 53-yard run (pass failed), 14:15. Rebels 31–13. Drive: 6 plays, 73 yards, 2:23.
- UNLV – Anthony Colandrea 13-yard run (Ramon Villela kick), 7:05. Rebels 38–13. Drive: 6 plays, 51 yards, 2:52.
- SHSU – Tim Burns Jr. 59-yard pass from Mabrey Mettauer (Mabrey Mettauer-Qua'Vez Humphreys pass), 5:01. Rebels 38–21. Drive: 5 plays, 68 yards, 1:57.

Statistics	UNLV	SHSU
First downs	21	20
Plays–yards	56–404	70–332
Rushes–yards	33–155	35–145
Passing yards	249	187
Passing: Comp–Att–Int	19–23–1	19–35–1
Turnovers	1	1
Time of possession	29:42	30:18

Team	Category	Player	Statistics
UNLV	Passing	Anthony Colandrea	19/23, 249 yards, 2 TD, INT
UNLV	Rushing	Jai'Den Thomas	9 carries, 65 yards, TD
UNLV	Receiving	Jaden Bradley	6 receptions, 125 yards, TD
Sam Houston	Passing	Hunter Watson	11/22, 101 yards
Sam Houston	Rushing	Landan Brown	10 carries, 85 yards, TD
Sam Houston	Receiving	Tim Burns Jr.	1 reception, 59 yards, TD

=== at Hawaii ===
Game Three – Sam Houston Bearkats (0–2) at Hawaii Rainbow Warriors (1–1) – Game summary

Quarter	1	2	3	4	Total
Bearkats	3	3	7	7	20
Rainbow Warriors	7	10	3	17	37

at Clarence T. C. Ching Athletics Complex • Honolulu, Hawaii

- Date: September 6
- Game time: 11:00 p.m. CST
- Game weather: Sunny and breezy, 82 °F (28 °C)
- Game attendance: 11,625
- Referee: Kenneth Ray
- TV announcers (Spectrum Sports): Kanoa Leahey (play-by-play) and Rich Miano (color)
- Box score, Recap

Game information

First quarter

- (10:46) HAW – Landon Sims 1-yard pass from Luke Weaver, Kansei Matsuzawa kick (Drive: 8 plays, 78 yards, 2:51; Hawaii 7–0)
- (4:48) SHSU – RJ Lopez 28-yard field goal (Drive: 8 plays, 47 yards, 3:17; Hawaii 7–3)

Second quarter

- (5:45) HAW – Giovanni Iovino 41-yard interception return, Kansei Matsuzawa kick (Hawaii 14–3)
- (1:57) SHSU – RJ Lopez 29-yard field goal (Drive: 9 plays, 64 yards, 3:48; Hawaii 14–6)
- (0:00) HAW – Kansei Matsuzawa 38-yard field goal (Drive: 10 plays, 55 yards, 1:57; Hawaii 17–6)

Third quarter

- (10:13) HAW – Kansei Matsuzawa 43-yard field goal (Drive: 12 plays, 50 yards, 4:44; Hawaii 20–6)
- (3:18) SHSU – Emon Allen 66-yard interception return, RJ Lopez kick (Hawaii 20–13)

Fourth quarter

- (13:37) HAW – Pofele Ashlock 6-yard pass from Luke Weaver, Kansei Matsuzawa kick (Drive: 9 plays, 76 yards, 4:35; Hawaii 27–13)
- (8:15) SHSU – Elijah Green 21-yard pass from Landyn Locke, RJ Lopez kick (Drive: 10 plays, 90 yards, 5:16; Hawaii 27–20)
- (3:01) HAW – Kansei Matsuzawa 19-yard field goal (Drive: 10 plays, 58 yards, 5:07; Hawaii 30–20)
- (1:47) HAW – Pofele Ashlock 15-yard pass from Luke Weaver, Kansei Matsuzawa kick (Drive: 4 plays, 23 yards, 0:28; Hawaii 37–20)

Statistics	SHSU	HAW
First downs	19	24
Plays–yards	59–248	77–417
Rushes–yards	31–89	34–123
Passing yards	159	294
Passing: Comp–Att–Int	18–28–1	27–43–1
Turnovers	1	2
Time of possession	27:07	32:53

Team	Category	Player	Statistics
Sam Houston	Passing	Mabrey Mattauer	12–18, 91 yards, INT
Sam Houston	Rushing	Mabrey Mettauer	17 carries, 45 yards
Sam Houston	Receiving	Elijah Green	3 receptions, 45 yards, TD
Hawaii	Passing	Luke Weaver	27–43, 294 yards, 3 TD, INT
Hawaii	Rushing	Landon Sims	14 carries, 60 yards
Hawaii	Receiving	Pofele Ashlock	7 receptions, 125 yards, 2 TD

=== at No. 8 Texas ===
Game Four – Sam Houston Bearkats (0–3) at No. 8 Texas Longhorns (2–1) – Game summary

Quarter	1	2	3	4	Total
Bearkats	0	0	0	0	0
No. 8 Longhorns	14	17	17	7	55

at Darrell K Royal–Texas Memorial Stadium • Austin, Texas

- Date: September 20
- Game time: 7:00 p.m. CDT
- Game attendance: 103,003
- Referee: Jason Autrey
- TV announcers (SECN+/ESPN+): Clay Matvick (play-by-play), Chase Daniel (analyst), and Tori Petry (sideline)
- Box score, Recap

Game information

First quarter

- (6:23) TEX - Jerrick Gibson 13-yard run, Mason Shipley kick (Drive: 12 plays, 76 yards, 5:29; Texas 7-0)
- (0:45) TEX - Arch Manning 5-yard run, Mason Shipley kick (Drive: 9 plays, 60 yards, 3:27; Texas 14-0)

Second quarter

- (12:50) TEX - Jordan Washington 32-yard pass from Arch Manning, Mason Shipley kick (Drive: 3 plays, 70 yards, 1:15; Texas 21-0)
- (5:50) TEX - Mason Shipley 29-yard field goal (Drive: 7 plays, 60 yards, 4:15; Texas 24-0)
- (1:25) TEX - Arch Manning 2-yard run, Mason Shipley kick (Drive: 7 plays, 70 yards, 2:47; Texas 31-0)

Third quarter

- (13:51) TEX - Ryan Wingo 53-yard pass from Arch Manning, Mason Shipley kick (Drive: 3 plays, 75 yards, 1:03; Texas 38-0)
- (10:46) TEX - Ryan Wingo 13-yard pass from Arch Manning, Mason Shipley kick (Drive: 4 plays, 25 yards, 1:25; Texas 45-0)
- (4:54) TEX - Mason Shipley 32-yard field goal (Drive: 7 plays, 21 yards, 3:05; Texas 48-0)

Fourth quarter

- (13:22) TEX - Christian Clark 5-yard run (Drive: 8 plays, 91 yards, 3:39; Texas 55-0)

Statistics	SHSU	TEX
First downs	7	26
Plays–yards	51–113	69–607
Rushes–yards	26–27	41–264
Passing yards	86	343
Passing: comp–att–int	13–25–1	23–28–0
Turnovers	1	0
Time of possession	26:09	33:51

Team	Category	Player	Statistics
Sam Houston	Passing	Hunter Wilson	13–25, 86 yards, INT
Sam Houston	Rushing	Hunter Watson	15 carries, 32 yards
Sam Houston	Receiving	Landan Brown	6 receptions, 37 yards
Texas	Passing	Arch Manning	18–21, 309 yards, 3 TD
Texas	Rushing	Christian Clark	13 rushes, 62 yards, TD
Texas	Receiving	Ryan Wingo	4 receptions, 93 yards, 2 TD

=== at New Mexico State ===
Game Five – Sam Houston Bearkats (0–4) at New Mexico State Aggies (2–2) – Game summary

Quarter	1	2	3	4	Total
Bearkats	0	3	7	0	10
Aggies	0	10	3	24	37

at Aggie Memorial Stadium • Las Cruces, New Mexico

- Date: October 2
- Game time: 8:00 p.m. CDT/7:00 p.m. MDT
- Game weather: Sunny • Temperature: 88 °F (31 °C) • Wind: N 6 mph
- Game attendance: 9,089
- Referee: Reed Brotherton
- TV announcers (CBSSN): Jack Gordon (play-by-play) and Taylor McHargue (analyst)
- Box score, Recap

Game information

First quarter

- No scoring plays.

Second quarter

- (7:00) NMSU – Ryan Hawk 28-yard field goal (Drive: 15 plays, 87 yards, 8:20; New Mexico State 3–0)
- (2:45) NMSU – Logan Fife 1-yard run, Ryan Hawk kick (Drive: 5 plays, 53 yards, 2:48; New Mexico State 10–0)
- (0:35) SAM – Christian Pavon 51-yard field goal (Drive: 8 plays, 42 yards, 2:10; New Mexico State 10–3)

Third quarter

- (3:40) NMSU – Ryan Hawk 32-yard field goal (Drive: 6 plays, 66 yards, 3:16; New Mexico State 13–3)
- (0:01) SAM – Alton McCaskill 15-yard pass from Hunter Watson, Christian Pavon kick (Drive: 7 plays, 75 yards, 3:39; New Mexico State 13–10)

Fourth quarter

- (12:09) NMSU – Kadarius Calloway 3-yard run, Ryan Hawk kick (Drive: 8 plays, 75 yards, 2:52; New Mexico State 20–10)
- (11:05) NMSU – PJ Johnson III 4-yard pass from Logan Fife, Ryan Hawk kick (Drive: 3 plays, 2 yards, 1:00; New Mexico State 27–10)
- (4:56) NMSU – Ryan Hawk 45-yard field goal (Drive: 6 plays, 12 yards, 3:33; New Mexico State 30–10)
- (2:39) NMSU – Naeten Mitchell 71-yard interception, Ryan Hawk kick (New Mexico State 37–10)

Statistics	SHSU	NMSU
First downs	18	20
Plays–yards	65–313	57–350
Rushes–yards	26–69	31–95
Passing yards	244	255
Passing: Comp–Att–Int	27–39–1	19–26–0
Turnovers	3	1
Time of possession	30:15	29:45

Team	Category	Player	Statistics
Sam Houston	Passing	Hunter Watson	22/34, 222 yards, TD, INT
Sam Houston	Rushing	Alton McCaskill	12 carries, 38 yards
Sam Houston	Receiving	Landan Brown	7 receptions, 53 yards
New Mexico State	Passing	Logan Fife	19/26, 255 yards, TD
New Mexico State	Rushing	Kadarius Calloway	15 carries, 66 yards, TD
New Mexico State	Receiving	TK King	6 receptions, 132 yards

=== vs. Jacksonville State ===
Game Six – Jacksonville State Gamecocks (2–3) at Sam Houston Bearkats (0–5) – Game summary

Quarter	1	2	3	4	Total
Gamecocks	7	10	0	12	29
Bearkats	0	14	7	6	27

at Shell Energy Stadium • Houston, Texas

- Date: October 9
- Game time: 7:00 p.m. CDT
- Game weather: Sunny • Temperature: 85 °F (29 °C) • Wind: NE 10 mph
- Game attendance: 5,419
- Referee: Douglas Mercer
- TV announcers (CBSSN): Jack Gordon (play-by-play) and Taylor McHargue (analyst)
- Box score, Recap

Game information

First quarter

- (8:57) JVST – Caden Creel 7-yard run, Garrison Rippa kick (Drive: 10 plays, 59 yards, 4:35; Jacksonville State 7–0)

Second quarter

- (14:01) JVST – Garrison Rippa 30-yard field goal (Drive: 5 plays, 77 yards, 1:05; Jacksonville State 10–0)
- (10:13) SHSU – Landan Brown 1-yard run, Christian Pavon kick (Drive: 1 play, 1 yard, 0:04; Jacksonville State 10–7)
- (6:15) JVST – Cam Cook 2-yard run, Garrison Rippa kick (Drive: 8 plays, 75 yards, 3:58; Jacksonville State 17–7)
- (4:28) SHSU – Qua'Vez Humphreys 4-yard pass from Hunter Watson, Christian Pavon kick (Drive: 4 plays, 75 yards, 1:47; Jacksonville State 17–14)

Third quarter

- (8:46) SHSU – Chris Reed 20-yard pass from Hunter Watson, Christian Pavon kick (Drive: 8 plays, 80 yards, 3:48; Sam Houston 21–17)

Fourth quarter

- (14:56) JVST – Garrison Rippa 26-yard field goal (Drive: 8 plays, 40 yards, 4:10; Sam Houston 21–20)
- (10:34) JVST – Cam Cook 7-yard run (Drive: 5 plays, 52 yards, 2:26; Jacksonville State 26–21)
- (0:52) SHSU – Chris Reed 19-yard pass from Hunter Watson (Drive: 8 plays, 59 yards, 4:03; Sam Houston 27–26)
- (0:00) JVST – Garrison Rippa 52-yard field goal (Drive: 7 plays, 48 yards, 0:47; Jacksonville State 29–27)

Statistics	JVST	SHSU
First downs	26	15
Plays–yards	80–499	52–286
Rushes–yards	63–370	33–150
Passing yards	129	136
Passing: Comp–Att–Int	13–17–0	12–19–0
Turnovers	1	1
Time of possession	35:13	24:47

Team	Category	Player	Statistics
Jacksonville State	Passing	Caden Creel	13/17, 129 yards
Jacksonville State	Rushing	Cam Cook	31 carries, 218 yards, 2 TD
Jacksonville State	Receiving	Pearson Baldwin	5 receptions, 72 yards
Sam Houston	Passing	Hunter Watson	12/19, 136 yards, 3 TD
Sam Houston	Rushing	Alton McCaskill	14 carries, 87 yards
Sam Houston	Receiving	Chris Reed	3 receptions, 63 yards, 2 TD

=== vs. UTEP ===
Game Seven – UTEP Miners (1–5) at Sam Houston Bearkats (0–6) – Game summary

Quarter	1	2	3	4	Total
Miners	7	7	7	14	35
Bearkats	7	3	7	0	17

at Shell Energy Stadium • Houston, Texas

- Date: October 15
- Game time: 6:00 p.m. CDT
- Game weather: Sunny • Temperature: 82 °F (28 °C) • Wind: SE 14 mph
- Game attendance: 4,657
- Referee: Ron Hudson
- TV announcers (CBSSN): Jack Gordon (play-by-play) and Taylor McHargue (analyst)
- Box score, Recap

Game information

First quarter

- (9:25) SHSU – Malik Phillips 20-yard pass from Hunter Watson, Christian Pavon kick (Drive: 8 plays, 99 yards, 3:50; Sam Houston 7–0)
- (2:52) UTEP – Josh Schuchts 4-yard pass from Skyler Locklear, Carlos Arreola kick (Drive: 3 plays, 50 yards, 1:07; Tied 7–7)

Second quarter

- (12:06) UTEP – Skyler Locklear 2-yard run, Carlos Arreola kick (Drive: 9 plays, 86 yards, 3:38; UTEP 14–7)
- (7:27) SHSU – Christian Pavon 26-yard field goal (Drive: 10 plays, 77 yards, 4:32; UTEP 14–10)

Third quarter

- (6:20) UTEP – Skyler Locklear 15-yard run, Carlos Arreola kick (Drive: 10 plays, 67 yards, 3:41; UTEP 21–10)
- (3:03) SHSU – Lonnie Adkism 13-yard pass from Mabrey Mettauer, Christian Pavon kick (Drive: 6 plays, 90 yards, 3:09; UTEP 21–17)

Fourth quarter

- (7:05) UTEP – Kenny Odom 20-yard pass from Skyler Locklear, Carlos Arreola kick (Drive: 8 plays, 91 yards, 3:24; UTEP 28–17)
- (5:54) UTEP – Ashten Emory 34-yard run, Carlos Arreola kick (Drive: 1 play, 34 yards, 0:08; UTEP 35–17)

Statistics	UTEP	SHSU
First downs	19	20
Plays–yards	60–411	76–398
Rushes–yards	34–175	40–159
Passing yards	236	239
Passing: Comp–Att–Int	21–26–1	22–36–0
Turnovers	2	1
Time of possession	24:35	35:25

Team	Category	Player	Statistics
UTEP	Passing	Skyler Locklear	21/26, 236 yards, 2 TD, INT
UTEP	Rushing	Ashten Emory	15 carries, 96 yards, TD
UTEP	Receiving	Wondame Davis Jr.	3 receptions, 79 yards
Sam Houston	Passing	Hunter Watson	13/19, 161 yards, TD
Sam Houston	Rushing	Landan Brown	13 carries, 110 yards
Sam Houston	Receiving	Chris Reed	3 receptions, 51 yards

=== at Louisiana Tech ===
Game Eight – Sam Houston Bearkats (0–7) at Louisiana Tech Bulldogs (4–3) – Game summary

Quarter	1	2	3	4	Total
Bearkats	0	0	14	0	14
Bulldogs	14	13	14	14	55

at Joe Aillet Stadium • Ruston, Louisiana

- Date: October 31
- Game time: 7:00 p.m. CDT
- Game weather: Sunny • Temperature: 64 °F (18 °C) • Wind: SW 3 mph
- Game attendance: 17,841
- Referee: Rory Bernard
- TV announcers (CBSSN): Jack Gordon (play-by-play) and Ben DiNucci (analyst)
- Box score, Recap

Game information

First quarter

- LT – Devin Gandy 36-yard pass from Blake Baker (Drew Henderson kick), 11:48. Bulldogs 7–0. Drive: 7 plays, 74 yards, 3:04.
- LT – Clay Thevenin 6-yard run (Drew Henderson kick), 6:33. Bulldogs 14–0. Drive: 5 plays, 58 yards, 2:10.

Second quarter

- LT – Clay Thevenin 50-yard run (Drew Henderson kick), 13:39. Bulldogs 21–0. Drive: 6 plays, 82 yards, 3:14.
- LT – Blake Baker 1-yard run (kick failed), 6:44. Bulldogs 27–0. Drive: 8 plays, 95 yards, 4:15.

Third quarter

- SHSU – Elijah Green 28-yard run (Christian Pavon kick), 9:23. Bulldogs 27–7. Drive: 5 plays, 67 yards, 2:17.
- LT – Omiri Wiggins 16-yard run (Drew Henderson kick), 5:53. Bulldogs 34–7. Drive: 8 plays, 77 yards, 3:25.
- LT – Clay Thevenin 25-yard run (Drew Henderson kick), 3:25. Bulldogs 41–7. Drive: 3 plays, 66 yards, 0:59.
- SHSU – Elijah Green 80-yard run (Christian Pavon kick), 3:13. Bulldogs 41–14. Drive: 1 play, 80 yards, 0:12.

Fourth quarter

- LT – Jacob Fields 85-yard interception return (Drew Henderson kick), 11:13. Bulldogs 48–14.
- LT – Andrew Burnette 66-yard run (Drew Henderson kick), 5:08. Bulldogs 55–14. Drive: 1 play, 66 yards, 0:13.

Statistics	SHSU	LT
First downs	20	29
Plays–yards	73–503	60–647
Rushes–yards	33–296	39–426
Passing yards	207	221
Passing: comp–att–int	17–40–1	17–21–1
Turnovers	1	2
Time of possession	31:08	28:52

Team	Category	Player	Statistics
Sam Houston	Passing	Hunter Watson	14/33, 193 yards, INT
Sam Houston	Rushing	Elijah Green	10 carries, 191 yards, 2 TD
Sam Houston	Receiving	Chris Reed	6 receptions, 79 yards
Louisiana Tech	Passing	Blake Baker	17/21, 221 yards, TD, INT
Louisiana Tech	Rushing	Clay Thevenin	11 carries, 143 yards, 3 TD
Louisiana Tech	Receiving	Devin Gandy	2 receptions, 78 yards, TD

=== at Oregon State ===
Game Nine – Sam Houston Bearkats (0–8) at Oregon State Beavers (2–7) – Game summary

Quarter	1	2	3	4	Total
Bearkats	0	7	7	7	21
Beavers	10	7	0	0	17

at Reser Stadium • Corvallis, Oregon

- Date: November 8
- Game time: 9:00 p.m. CST/7:00 p.m. PST
- Game weather: Cloudy, 50 °F (10 °C)
- Game attendance: 31,626
- Referee: John Love
- TV announcers (The CW): Ted Robinson (play-by-play), Ryan Leaf (analyst) and Nigel Burton (sideline)
- Box score, Recap

Game information

First quarter

- ORST – Anthony Hankerson 2-yard run (Caleb Ojeda kick), 11:55. Beavers 7–0. Drive: 6 plays, 71 yards, 2:59.
- ORST – Caleb Ojeda 33-yard field goal, 8:00. Beavers 10–0. Drive: 5 plays, 24 yards, 2:20.

Second quarter

- ORST – Anthony Hankerson 13-yard run (Caleb Ojeda kick), 6:53. Beavers 17–0. Drive: 11 plays, 80 yards, 6:33.
- SHSU – Chris Reed 35-yard pass from Mabrey Mettauer (Christian Pavon kick), 1:14. Beavers 17–7. Drive: 1 play, 35 yards, 0:06.

Third quarter

- SHSU – Tim Burns Jr. 98-yard kickoff return (Christian Pavon kick), 14:42. Beavers 17–14.

Fourth quarter

- SHSU – Brody Henderson 31-yard blocked punt return (Christian Pavon kick), 8:29. Bearkats 21–17.

Statistics	SHSU	ORST
First downs	8	28
Plays–yards	48–157	82–474
Rushes–yards	24–72	40–188
Passing yards	85	286
Passing: comp–att–int	9–24–1	29–42–2
Turnovers	1	3
Time of possession	21:47	38:13

Team	Category	Player	Statistics
Sam Houston	Passing	Mabrey Mattauer	4/10, 43 yards, TD
Sam Houston	Rushing	Mabrey Mattauer	3 carries, 29 yards
Sam Houston	Receiving	Chris Reed	3 receptions, 47 yards, TD
Oregon State	Passing	Gabarri Johnson	29/42, 286 yards, 2 INT
Oregon State	Rushing	Anthony Hankerson	33 carries, 166 yards, 2 TD
Oregon State	Receiving	David Wells Jr.	9 receptions, 112 yards

=== vs. Delaware ===
Game Ten – Delaware Fightin' Blue Hens (5–4) at Sam Houston Bearkats (1–8) – Game summary

Quarter	1	2	3	4	Total
Fightin' Blue Hens	7	3	0	13	23
Bearkats	0	10	13	3	26

at Shell Energy Stadium • Houston, Texas

- Date: November 15
- Game time: 6:00 p.m. CST
- Game weather: Clear, 77 °F (25 °C)
- Game attendance: 3,713
- Referee: Douglas Mercer
- TV announcers (ESPN+): Matt Pedersen, Jason Barfield, and Brooke Kirchhofer
- Box score, Recap

Game information

First quarter

- DEL – Nick Minicucci 7-yard run (Nate Reed kick), 2:14. Fightin' Blue Hens 7–0. Drive: 8 plays, 88 yards, 3:29.

Second quarter

- DEL – Nate Reed 37-yard field goal, 9:20. Fightin' Blue Hens 10–0. Drive: 12 plays, 60 yards, 5:30.
- SHSU – Landan Brown 2-yard run (Christian Pavon kick), 2:35. Fightin' Blue Hens 10–7. Drive: 4 plays, 47 yards, 1:35.
- SHSU – Christian Pavon 33-yard field goal, 0:00. Tied 10–10. Drive: 10 plays, 47 yards, 1:43.

Third quarter

- SHSU – Christian Pavon 48-yard field goal, 11:22. Bearkats 13–10. Drive: 9 plays, 55 yards, 3:33.
- SHSU – Landan Brown 62-yard run (Christian Pavon kick), 8:34. Bearkats 20–10. Drive: 2 plays, 67 yards, 0:38.
- SHSU – Christian Pavon 23-yard field goal, 3:52. Bearkats 23–10. Drive: 6 plays, 44 yards, 3:24.

Fourth quarter

- SHSU – Christian Pavon 48-yard field goal, 11:58. Bearkats 26–10. Drive: 4 plays, -10 yards, 1:37.
- DEL – Viron Ellison Jr. 3-yard run (pass failed), 8:47. Bearkats 26–16. Drive: 9 plays, 75 yards, 3:11.
- DEL – Max Patterson 26-yard pass from Nick Minicucci (Nate Reed kick), 2:36. Bearkats 26–23. Drive: 6 plays, 78 yards, 1:37.

Statistics	DEL	SHSU
First downs	25	20
Plays–yards	75–433	68–352
Rushes–yards	39–95	29–139
Passing yards	338	213
Passing: Comp–Att–Int	24–36–1	16–39–0
Turnovers	3	0
Time of possession	32:06	27:54

Team	Category	Player	Statistics
Delaware	Passing	Nick Minicucci	24/36, 338 yards, TD, INT
Delaware	Rushing	Viron Ellison Jr.	19 carries, 97 yards, TD
Delaware	Receiving	Sean Wilson	9 receptions, 162 yards
Sam Houston	Passing	Landyn Locke	16/38, 213 yards
Sam Houston	Rushing	Landan Brown	10 carries, 109 yards, 2 TD
Sam Houston	Receiving	Chris Reed	2 receptions, 66 yards

=== at Middle Tennessee ===
Game Eleven – Sam Houston Bearkats (2–8) at Middle Tennessee Blue Raiders (1–9) – Game summary

Quarter	1	2	3	4	Total
Bearkats	10	0	0	7	17
Blue Raiders	0	10	7	14	31

at Johnny "Red" Floyd Stadium • Murfreesboro, Tennessee

- Date: November 22
- Game time: 2:00 p.m. CST
- Game weather: Cloudy, 66 °F (19 °C)
- Game attendance: 7,605
- Referee: Reed Brotherton
- TV announcers (ESPN+): Jake Rose, Jeremy Kellem, and Justin Beasley
- Box score, Recap

Game information

First quarter

- SHSU – Christian Pavon 38-yard field goal, 11:04. Bearkats 3–0. Drive: 10 plays, 45 yards, 3:56.
- SHSU – Chris Reed 54-yard pass from Landyn Locke (Christian Pavon kick), 5:22. Bearkats 10–0. Drive: 6 plays, 93 yards, 3:31.

Second quarter

- MTSU – Rickey Hunt Jr. 1-yard run (Zach Benedict kick), 9:45. Bearkats 10–7. Drive: 10 plays, 77 yards, 5:41.
- MTSU – Jacob Hathaway 27-yard field goal, 0:19. Tied 10–10. Drive: 13 plays, 76 yards, 1:57.

Third quarter

- MTSU – Jekail Middlebrook 19-yard pass from Roman Gagliano (Jacob Hathaway kick), 5:26. Blue Raiders 17–10. Drive: 7 plays, 82 yards, 3:16.

Fourth quarter

- MTSU – Roman Gagliano 33-yard run (Jacob Hathaway kick), 12:55. Blue Raiders 24–10. Drive: 6 plays, 82 yards, 1:42.
- MTSU – Roman Gagliano 2-yard run (Jacob Hathaway kick), 2:10. Blue Raiders 31–10. Drive: 7 plays, 78 yards, 2:45.
- SHSU – Chris Reed 4-yard pass from Landyn Locke (Christian Pavon kick), 0:55. Blue Raiders 31–17. Drive: 6 plays, 75 yards, 1:15.

Statistics	SHSU	MTSU
First downs	20	24
Plays–yards	65–360	66–460
Rushes–yards	24–79	32–192
Passing yards	281	268
Passing: Comp–Att–Int	25–41–1	21–34–0
Turnovers	1	0
Time of possession	30:35	29:25

Team	Category	Player	Statistics
Sam Houston	Passing	Landyn Locke	25/40, 281 yards, 2 TD, INT
Sam Houston	Rushing	Alton McCaskill	11 carries, 42 yards
Sam Houston	Receiving	Grady O'Neill	8 receptions, 89 yards
Middle Tennessee	Passing	Roman Gagliano	21/34, 268 yards, TD
Middle Tennessee	Rushing	Jekail Middlebrook	15 carries, 106 yards
Middle Tennessee	Receiving	Myles Butler	6 receptions, 65 yards

=== vs. FIU ===
Game Twelve – FIU Panthers (6–5) at Sam Houston Bearkats (2–9) – Game summary

Quarter	1	2	3	4	Total
Panthers	22	6	14	14	56
Bearkats	7	3	0	6	16

at Shell Energy Stadium • Houston, Texas

- Date: November 29
- Game time: 12:00 p.m. CST
- Game attendance: 4,237
- Referee: Douglas Mercer
- TV announcers (ESPN+): Matt Pedersen (play-by-play), Jorge Vargas (analyst) and Brooke Kirchhofer (sideline)

Game information

First quarter

- FIU – Dallas Payne 4-yard pass from Keyone Jenkins (Noah Grant kick), 12:46. Panthers 7–0. Drive: 5 plays, 70 yards, 2:07.
- SHSU – Landan Brown 1-yard run (Christian Pavon kick), 10:30. Tied 7–7. Drive: 7 plays, 75 yards, 2:16.
- FIU – Alex Perry 8-yard pass from Keyone Jenkins (Noah Grant kick), 4:06. Panthers 14–7. Drive: 5 plays, 56 yards, 2:49.
- FIU – Alex Perry 35-yard pass from Keyone Jenkins (Kejon Owens run), 1:37. Panthers 22–7. Drive: 3 plays, 64 yards, 1:01.

Second quarter

- SHSU – Christian Pavon 34-yard field goal, 13:00. Panthers 22–10. Drive: 8 plays, 59 yards, 3:33.
- FIU – Noah Grant 29-yard field goal, 7:29. Panthers 25–10. Drive: 4 plays, -4 yards, 1:27.
- FIU – Noah Grant 24-yard field goal, 0:16. Panthers 28–10. Drive: 8 plays, 76 yards, 2:39.

Third quarter

- FIU – Keyone Jenkins 6-yard run (Noah Grant kick), 6:04. Panthers 35–10. Drive: 6 plays, 89 yards, 2:33.
- FIU – Anthony Carrie 1-yard run (Noah Grant kick), 0:44. Panthers 42–10. Drive: 7 plays, 36 yards, 3:16.

Fourth quarter

- SHSU – Grady O'Neill 8-yard pass from Landyn Locke (pass failed), 7:16. Panthers 42–16. Drive: 11 plays, 53 yards, 4:57.
- FIU – Sterling Joseph 61-yard run (Noah Grant kick), 3:08. Panthers 49–16. Drive: 1 play, 61 yards, 0:10.
- FIU – Sterling Joseph 31-yard run (Noah Grant kick), 1:51. Panthers 56–16. Drive: 2 plays, 50 yards, 0:34.

Statistics	FIU	SHSU
First downs	24	19
Plays–yards	64–594	71–359
Rushes–yards	40–303	38–196
Passing yards	291	163
Passing: Comp–Att–Int	15–24–1	16–33–2
Turnovers	1	4
Time of possession	30:41	29:19

Team	Category	Player	Statistics
FIU	Passing	Keyone Jenkins	15/24, 291 yards, 3 TD, INT
FIU	Rushing	Kejon Owens	15 carries, 124 yards
FIU	Receiving	Alex Perry	7 receptions, 140 yards, 2 TD
Sam Houston	Passing	Landyn Locke	14/30, 121 yards, TD, 2 INT
Sam Houston	Rushing	Elijah Green	11 carries, 98 yards
Sam Houston	Receiving	Grady O'Neill	8 receptions, 70 yards, TD

== Personnel ==
=== Roster ===
2025 Sam Houston Bearkats football team roster
Players
Coaches
Offense

Pos.	#	Name	Class
WR	0	Darrick Bledsoe III	So
WR	1	Aviyon Smith-Mack	Jr
WR	2	Kaleb Black	So
QB	3	Mabrey Mettauer	Fr
WR	4	Michael Phoenix II	Sr
WR	5	Lonnie Adkism	So
WR	6	Grady O'Neill	Jr
WR	7	Qua'Vez Humphreys	Sr
QB	8	Landyn Locke	Fr
RB	9	Jerrian Parker Jr.	So
QB	10	Hunter Watson	Sr
WR	11	Malik Phillips	Sr
TE	12	Austin Smith	Sr
QB	15	DJ Bailey	Fr
WR	18	Fatu Mukuba	So
TE	19	Rayfield Lotten	So
RB	21	Elijah Green	Sr
RB	22	Alton McCaskill	Sr
RB	25	Ah'Marion Gaines-Smith	Jr
RB	28	Shane Porter	Sr
RB	34	Landan Brown	So
RB	38	Adrian Murdaugh	Sr
RB	41	Trey Taylor	Fr
OL	54	Mich'le Joseph	Jr
OL	56	Luke Eckardt	Sr
OL	57	Zo'Maryon Bryan	Jr
OL	59	Graceson Jackson-Smith	Sr
OL	62	Carter Buchheit	Fr
OL	63	Cam Todd	Jr
OL	67	Isaac Sohn	So
OL	68	Jeremiah Edmond	So
OL	69	Logan Cahill	Fr
OL	70	Rhett Larson	Jr
OL	71	James Dawn II	Sr
OL	72	Quinton Williams	Jr
OL	74	Graceson Spann	Fr
OL	75	William McCollum	Sr
OL	76	Payton McDonald	Jr
OL	77	Kevin Kalonji	Sr
OL	79	Kolt Dieterich	So
WR	80	Tim Burns Jr.	Jr
RB	81	Xander Cheek	So
TE	82	Cooper Stevens	Fr
WR	83	Matthew Tatum	So
WR	84	London Deyon	Fr
TE	85	Dylan Burk	Fr
TE	86	Thomas Jewett	Jr
WR	87	Chris Reed	Jr
WR	88	Terrance Guillory II	Fr
TE	89	Fernando Garza III	Sr

Defense

Pos.	#	Name	Class
DB	0	Alonzo Edwards Jr.	GS
LB	1	JaMair Diaz	Jr
DB	2	Cecil Powell	GS
DB	3	Trey Harris	GS
DB	4	Jaidan Scott	Jr
DB	5	Jalyn Stanford	So
LB	6	Antavious Fish	GS
DB	7	Emon Allen	Sr
LB	8	CJ Johnson	Sr
DB	9	Jace Arnold	So
B	10	Jacob Robinson	Jr
DB	12	Tyler Bailey	Jr
DE	14	Bryen Spaulding	Jr
DB	16	Joe Swen	So
DE	17	Christopher Eaton Jr.	GS
DB	20	Dravon Wilson	Fr
DL	23	AJ Sargent	Sr
DB	24	CJ Brown	Sr
LB	26	Tokyo Gordon	Jr
DB	27	Maurice Mathis	Jr
DB	29	Lyric Smith	Fr
LB	30	Dean Ford	Fr
DB	31	Dax Horany	So
DB	32	Quan Williams	Sr
DL	33	Zeiqui Lawton	Sr
DB	35	Cadiin Johnson	Sr
DB	36	Octavius Henderson	Jr
OLB	37	Jacquis Ishmeal Jr.	Sr
DB	39	Davion Green	Jr
DB	40	Railyn Adams	Fr
DB	41	Braylen Wortham	Fr
OLB	42	Ca'lub Holloway	Jr
LB	43	Jayveon Johnson	Fr
DE	44	Brody Henderson	Fr
LB	45	Eli Wallace	So
LB	47	Cartier Okopie	Fr
DE	48	Chauncey Chidi	Jr
LB	50	Cole Worthington	So
DL	51	Jaredh Frayre	So
DL	58	Joshua Frayre	So
DT	90	Darien Jackson	So
DL	92	Anthony Shorter	Fr
DL	93	Caius Coy	Fr
DL	94	Josiah Stephens	Fr
DT	95	She'Fon Boyd	So
DL	97	Dylan Frazier	Jr
DL	98	Quardale Patt	Sr
DL	99	Keelan Cox	Sr

Special teams

Pos.	#	Name	Class
P	35	Curtis Gerrand	Fr
K	37	RJ Lopez	GS
LS	46	Carson Whitington	Jr
LS	47	Jake Fitzgerald	Jr
K, P	49	Christian Pavon	Sr
K	81	Nico Ottomanelli	Fr
K	83	Tate Ryan	Fr

Head coach

- Phil Longo

Coordinators/assistant coaches

- Eric Raisbeck – Associate head coach/special teams coordinator/slot receivers
- Freddie Aughtry-Lindsay – Defensive coordinator
- Zack Patterson – Offensive coordinator
- Damien Adams – Defensive tackles
- Dovonte Edwards – Safeties
- AJ Hopp – Offensive line
- Gary McGraw – Cornerbacks
- Issac Mooring – Edges
- Keyan Williams – Wide receivers
- Knox Kadum – Offensive analyst

Legend

- (C) Team captain
- (S) Suspended
- (I) Ineligible
- Injured
- Redshirt

Roster
Last update: July 31, 2025

=== Transfers ===
==== Outgoing ====
Player	Position	Destination
Jax Brown	QB	Arkansas State
Chris Murray	DL	Auburn
Caleb Weaver	S	Duke
Kendrick DuJour	DE	East Carolina
Kaden Taylor	WR	East Texas A&M
Ben Gehrke	OL	Louisiana-Monroe
Sylas Gomez	QB	Millikin
Mitch Melton	LB	Navarro CC
Matthew Westmoreland	DL	Navarro CC
DJ McKinney	RB	New Mexico
Richard Outland Jr.	DL	North Texas
Quincy Wright	DL	North Texas
David Fisher	DB	North Texas
Trey Fields	LB	North Texas
Da'Veawn Armstead	DB	North Texas
Briceon Hayes	DE	North Texas
S'Maje Burrell	LB	North Texas
Simeon Evans	WR	North Texas
Jyzaiah Rockwell	WR	Prairie View A&M
Jalen O'Neal	DB	Prairie View A&M
Matthew Aribisala	DL	Rice
Jay Ducker	RB	Temple
Denver Warren	DL	UAB
Jase Bauer	QB	UT Martin
John Gentry	RB	UT Martin
Orion Irving	OL	Vanderbilt
Isaiah Cash	S	Virginia Tech
Godgive Ugochukwu	DL	Washburn
Zach Hrbacek	RB	Weber State
Marcus Field	WR	West Texas A&M
Easton Fulton	OL	West Texas A&M
Sincere Jackson	LB	Unknown
Chantson Prox	DB	Unknown
Jadon Cardell	K/P	Unknown
MarKendrick Beall	OL	Unknown
Rushil Patel	WR	Unknown
Colby Sessums	K/P	Unknown
Joe Swen	DB	Withdrawn
Michael Phoenix II	WR	Withdrawn
Fernando Garza III	TE	Withdrawn
Eli Wallace	DE	Withdrawn

==== Incoming ====
Player	Position	Previous school
Antavious Fish	LB	Akron
Kaleb Black	WR	Arizona State
Alton McCaskill	RB	Arizona State
CJ Brown	DB	Bowling Green
Chauncey Chidi	DE	Central Missouri
Tokyo Gordon	LB	College of the Sequoias
Trey Harris	S	Cornell
Ah'marion Gaines-Smith	RB	Fresno City CC
She'Fon Boyd	DT	Fullerton College
Cam Todd	OL	Garden City CC
Cade Adams	DL	Georgia Tech
JaMair Diaz	LB	Glenville State
Chris Eaton Jr.	DE	Hampton
Jalyn Stanford	DB	Houston
Elijah Green	RB	Indiana
Payton McDonald	OL	Iowa Western CC
Chris Reed	WR	Itawamba CC
Zo'Maryon Bryan	OL	Kilgore CC
Jaydyn Johnson	DB	Lindenwood
Aviyon Smith-Mack	WR	LIU
Quinton Williams	OL	Louisiana
Kevin Kalonji	OL	Maryland
Rayfield Lotten	TE	Mississippi State
Jake Fitzgerald	LS	Merrimack College
Xander Cheek	RB	Mary Hardin–Baylor
Maurice Mathis	DB	Monterey Peninsula CC
Darien Jackson	DL	Mt. San Antonio CC
Tim Burns Jr.	WR	Navarro CC
Nico Ottomanelli	K	Nebraska
Cole Worthington	LB	Nelson
Isaac Sohn	OL	North Texas
Shane Porter	RB	North Texas
Davion Green	DB	Palomar CC
RJ Lopez	K	Purdue
Bryen Spaulding	DE	San Diego Mesa CC
Octavius Henderson	DB	SEMO
Jerrian Parker	RB	Southern Illinois
AJ Sargent	DL	Tarleton State
Keelan Cox	DL	Texas Southern
AJ Edwards	DB	Texas State
Quinton Williams	OL	Trinity Valley CC
Cecil Powell	DB	Troy
Jacob Robinson	LB	Tyler JC
Zeiqui Lawton	DE	West Virginia
Jace Arnold	DB	Wisconsin
Mabrey Mettauer	QB	Wisconsin
Grady O'Neill	WR	Wisconsin

=== Coaching staff additions ===
Name	New position	Previous team	Previous position
Phil Longo	Head coach	Wisconsin	Offensive coordinator, quarterbacks coach
Eric Raisbeck	Associate Head coach, special teams coordinator / slot receivers	Wisconsin	Assistant special teams coordinator
Freddie Aughtry-Lindsay	Defensive coordinator	NC State	Nickels
Zack Patterson	Offensive coordinator	Wisconsin	Football analyst, assistant WRs
Damien Adams	Defensive tackles	Campbell	Defensive line
Dovonte Edwards	Safeties	Elon	Defensive coordinator, defensive backs
AJ Hopp	Offensive line	Southeastern Louisiana	Offensive line coach
Issac Mooring	Edges	Houston Christian	Defensive line
Keyan Williams	Wide receivers	Missouri	Assistant wide receivers, offensive assistant
