= List of current NCAA Division I FBS football coaches =

The National Collegiate Athletic Association (NCAA) Division I Football Bowl Subdivision (FBS) includes 138 teams. Each team has one head coach. In addition to the head coach, most teams also have at least one offensive coordinator and defensive coordinator; however, the head coach will sometimes assume one of these roles as well. FBS is composed of ten conferences: American Conference (American), Atlantic Coast Conference (ACC), Big 12 Conference, Big Ten Conference, Conference USA (CUSA), Mid-American Conference (MAC), Mountain West Conference (MW), Pac-12 Conference (Pac-12), Southeastern Conference (SEC), and Sun Belt Conference (SBC). All FBS schools except two (UConn & Notre Dame) are members of one of these conferences.

In 2019, Kirk Ferentz of Iowa became the longest-continuous tenured head coach in Division I FBS. Ferentz began his current coaching tenure in 1999 and is the only FBS head coach who began his current head coaching position before the 2000 season. Three coaches had a previous head coaching stint at their current school: Greg Schiano at Rutgers (2001–2011, 2020–present), Scott Frost at UCF (2016–2018, 2025–present), and Rich Rodriguez at West Virginia (2001–2007, 2025–present).

Coaches' records updated through week 12 of the 2026 college football season.

== Coaches ==
Team	Conference	Head coach	First season	W	L	W%	W	L	W%	Offensive coordinator(s)	Defensive coordinator(s)	Special teams coordinator(s)
				Current			Career DI FBS					
Army Black Knights	American	Jeff Monken	2014	94	68	.580	94	68	.580	Cody Worley	Daryl Dixon / Scot Sloan	Sean Saturnio
Charlotte 49ers	American	Tim Albin	2025	2	21	.087	35	40	.467	Todd Fitch	Nate Faanes	Brian Haines / Danny Orrock
East Carolina Pirates	American	Blake Harrell	2024	21	9	.700	21	9	.700	Jordan Davis	Jordan Hankins	Andre Powell
Florida Atlantic Owls	American	Zach Kittley	2025	11	12	.478	11	12	.478	Zach Kittley	Brett Dewhurst	Tyler Shovanec
Memphis Tigers	American	Charles Huff	2026	8	3	.727	47	28	.627	Kevin Decker / David Weeks	Lance Guidry	Tim Conner
Navy Midshipmen	American	Brian Newberry	2023	30	18	.625	30	18	.625	Drew Cronic	Ricky Brown / Eric Lewis	Mick Yokitis
North Texas Mean Green	American	Neal Brown	2026	7	4	.636	79	55	.590	Mike Bloesch	Bradley Dale Peveto / Matt Powledge	Jeff Crosby
Rice Owls	American	Scott Abell	2025	7	17	.292	7	17	.292	Vince Munch	Jon Kay	Mark Hogan
South Florida Bulls	American	Brian Hartline	2026	6	5	.545	6	5	.545	Vacant	Josh Aldridge	Chad Creamer
Temple Owls	American	K. C. Keeler	2025	7	16	.304	19	28	.404	Tyler Walker	Henry Baker	Brian Ginn
Tulane Green Wave	American	Will Hall	2026	6	5	.545	20	35	.364	Russ Callaway	Nate Fuqua / Tayler Polk	Chris Forestier
Tulsa Golden Hurricane	American	Tre Lamb	2025	11	12	.478	11	12	.478	Kevin Barbay / Ty Darlington	Mike Gray / Josh Reardon	Carter Barfield
UAB Blazers	American	Alex Mortensen	2025	8	9	.471	8	9	.471	Alex Mortensen	Todd Grantham	John Jones
UTSA Roadrunners	American	Jeff Traylor	2020	62	28	.689	62	28	.689	Rick Bowie	Jess Loepp	Zach Brown
Boston College Eagles	ACC	Bill O'Brien	2024	14	22	.389	29	31	.483	Bill O'Brien	Ted Roof	Matt Thurin
California Golden Bears	ACC	Tosh Lupoi	2026	3	8	.273	3	8	.273	Pat McCann	Da'Von Brown / Michael Hutchings	Zach Tinker
Clemson Tigers	ACC	Dabo Swinney	2009	193	57	.772	193	57	.772	Chad Morris	Tom Allen	Rich Bisaccia
Duke Blue Devils	ACC	Manny Diaz	2024	25	13	.658	46	28	.622	Jonathan Brewer	Jonathan Patke	Gabe Infante
Florida State Seminoles	ACC	Rick Stockstill (interim)	2026	2	1	.667	115	112	.507	Tim Harris Jr.	Tony White	Adam Scheier
Georgia Tech Yellow Jackets	ACC	Brent Key	2022	30	28	.517	30	28	.517	George Godsey / Chris Weinke	Jason Semore	Tim Salem
Louisville Cardinals	ACC	Jeff Brohm	2023	36	15	.706	102	59	.634	Brian Brohm	Steve Ellis / Mark Ivey	Karl Maslowski
Miami Hurricanes	ACC	Mario Cristobal	2022	45	20	.692	107	80	.572	Shannon Dawson	Corey Hetherman	Danny Kalter
North Carolina Tar Heels	ACC	Bill Belichick	2025	9	14	.391	9	14	.391	Bobby Petrino	Stephen Belichick	Billy Miller
NC State Wolfpack	ACC	Philip Rivers	2027	0	0	–	0	0	–	Jason Michael	Vacant	Vacant
Pittsburgh Panthers	ACC	Pat Narduzzi	2015	86	66	.566	86	66	.566	Kade Bell	Cory Sanders	Mike Priefer
SMU Mustangs	ACC	Rhett Lashlee	2022	45	21	.682	45	21	.682	Garin Justice / D'Eriq King / Rob Likens	Maurice Crum Jr. / Rickey Hunley Jr.	Casey Horny
Stanford Cardinal	ACC	Tavita Pritchard	2026	6	5	.545	6	5	.545	Terry Heffernan	Kris Richard	Nate Kaczor
Syracuse Orange	ACC	Fran Brown	2024	18	18	.500	18	18	.500	Mike Johnson / Jeff Nixon	Vince Kehres	Alex Bayer
Virginia Cavaliers	ACC	Tony Elliott	2022	28	31	.475	28	31	.475	Desmond Kitchings	John Rudzinski	Keith Gaither
Virginia Tech Hokies	ACC	James Franklin	2026	6	5	.545	134	65	.673	Ty Howle	Brent Pry	Doug Shearer
Wake Forest Demon Deacons	ACC	Jake Dickert	2025	19	5	.792	42	25	.627	Rob Ezell	Scottie Hazelton	Nick Whitworth
Arizona Wildcats	Big 12	Brent Brennan	2024	21	15	.583	55	63	.466	Seth Doege	Danny Gonzales	Craig Naivar
Arizona State Sun Devils	Big 12	Kenny Dillingham	2023	28	21	.571	28	21	.571	Marcus Arroyo	Brian Ward	Jack Nudo
Baylor Bears	Big 12	Joe Klanderman (interim)	2026	2	2	.500	2	2	.500	Jake Spavital	Joe Klanderman	Mark Scott
BYU Cougars	Big 12	Kalani Sitake	2016	93	47	.664	93	47	.664	Aaron Roderick	Kelly Poppinga	Justin Ena
Cincinnati Bearcats	Big 12	Scott Satterfield	2023	21	27	.438	93	67	.581	Nic Cardwell / Pete Thomas	Nate Woody	Luke Paschall
Colorado Buffaloes	Big 12	Deion Sanders	2023	20	28	.417	20	28	.417	Brennan Marion	Chris Marve	Grant Hammer
Houston Cougars	Big 12	Willie Fritz	2024	22	14	.611	93	68	.578	Slade Nagle	Austin Armstrong	Chris Couch
Iowa State Cyclones	Big 12	Jimmy Rogers	2026	5	6	.455	11	12	.478	Tyler Roehl	Jesse Bobbit	Rob Grande
Kansas Jayhawks	Big 12	Lance Leipold	2021	31	41	.431	68	74	.479	Andy Kotelnicki / Matt Lubick	D.K. McDonald	Taiwo Onatolu
Kansas State Wildcats	Big 12	Collin Klein	2026	4	7	.364	4	7	.364	Sean Gleeson	Jordan Peterson	Stanton Weber
Oklahoma State Cowboys	Big 12	Eric Morris	2026	7	4	.636	29	20	.592	Sean Brophy	Skyler Cassity	Drew Svoboda
TCU Horned Frogs	Big 12	Andy Avalos (interim)	2026	0	0	–	22	14	.611	Vacant / Gordon Sammis	Andy Avalos	Mark Tommerdahl
Texas Tech Red Raiders	Big 12	Joey McGuire	2022	45	19	.703	45	19	.703	Mack Leftwich	Rob Greene / Shiel Wood	Kenny Perry
UCF Knights	Big 12	Scott Frost	2025	29	19	.604 (Note: Includes tenure from 2016 to 2017)	45	50	.474	Steve Cooper	Alex Grinch	Pete Alamar
Utah Utes	Big 12	Morgan Scalley	2026	12	0	1.000	12	0	1.000	Kevin McGiven	Colton Swan	Sharrieff Shah
West Virginia Mountaineers	Big 12	Rich Rodriguez	2025	69	40	.633 (Note: Includes tenure from 2001 to 2007)	145	105	.580	Rich Rodriguez	Zac Alley	Pat Kirkland
Illinois Fighting Illini	Big Ten	Bret Bielema	2021	43	31	.581	140	89	.611	Barry Lunney Jr.	Roger Cooper	Chris Hurd
Indiana Hoosiers	Big Ten	Curt Cignetti	2024	36	4	.900	55	8	.873	Mike Shanahan	Bryant Haines	Grant Cain
Iowa Hawkeyes	Big Ten	Kirk Ferentz	1999	222	130	.631	222	130	.631	Tim Lester	Phil Parker	Chris Polizzi
Maryland Terrapins	Big Ten	Aazaar Abdul-Rahim (interim)	2026	2	2	.500	2	2	.500	Clint Trickett	Aazaar Abdul-Rahim / Zac Spavital	Matt Barnes
Michigan Wolverines	Big Ten	Kyle Whittingham	2026	6	5	.545	183	93	.663	Jim Harding	Jay Hill	Kerry Coombs
Michigan State Spartans	Big Ten	Pat Fitzgerald	2026	3	8	.273	113	109	.509	Nick Sheridan	Max Bullough / Joe Rossi	LeVar Woods
Minnesota Golden Gophers	Big Ten	P. J. Fleck	2017	72	49	.595	102	71	.590	Vacant / Matt Simon	Danny Collins	Daniel Da Prato
Nebraska Cornhuskers	Big Ten	Matt Rhule	2023	26	23	.531	73	66	.525	Glenn Thomas	Rob Aurich	Nick Humphrey / Brett Maher
Northwestern Wildcats	Big Ten	David Braun	2023	25	24	.510	25	24	.510	Chip Kelly	Tim McGarigle	Paul Creighton
Ohio State Buckeyes	Big Ten	Ryan Day	2019	89	16	.848	89	16	.848	Keenan Bailey / Arthur Smith	Matt Patricia / Tim Walton	Robbie Discher
Oregon Ducks	Big Ten	Dan Lanning	2022	56	11	.836	56	11	.836	Drew Mehringer	Chris Hampton	Joe Lorig
Penn State Nittany Lions	Big Ten	Matt Campbell	2026	6	5	.545	113	75	.601	Taylor Mouser	D'Anton Lynn	Justin Lustig
Purdue Boilermakers	Big Ten	Barry Odom	2025	5	18	.217	49	51	.490	Josh Henson	Vacant	James Shibest
Rutgers Scarlet Knights	Big Ten	Greg Schiano	2020	102	116	.468	102	116	.468	Kirk Ciarrocca	Travis Johansen	Eddie Allen
UCLA Bruins	Big Ten	Bob Chesney	2026	10	1	.909	31	7	.816	Dean Kennedy	Colin Hitschler	Drew Canan
USC Trojans	Big Ten	Lincoln Riley	2022	44	20	.688	99	30	.767	Luke Huard	Gary Patterson	Mike Ekeler
Washington Huskies	Big Ten	Jedd Fisch	2024	22	15	.595	39	37	.513	Jedd Fisch	Ryan Walters	Jordan Paopao
Wisconsin Badgers	Big Ten	Luke Fickell	2023	24	25	.490	87	50	.635	Jeff Grimes	Mike Tressel	Bob Ligashesky
Delaware Fightin' Blue Hens	CUSA	Ryan Carty	2022	39	22	.639	13	11	.542	Terence Archer	Manny Rojas	Rocco DiMeco / Garrett Smith
Florida International Panthers	CUSA	Willie Simmons	2025	11	13	.458	11	13	.458	Nick Coleman	Jovan Dewitt	Kenneth Gilstrap
Jacksonville State Gamecocks	CUSA	Charles Kelly	2025	17	8	.680	17	8	.680	Taylor Housewright	Brian Williams	Max Thurmond
Kennesaw State Owls	CUSA	Jerry Mack	2025	15	10	.600	15	10	.600	Mitch Militello	Marc Mattioli	Kyle Blocker
Liberty Flames	CUSA	Jamey Chadwell	2023	35	14	.714	74	36	.673	Newland Isaac	Skylor Magee	Kyle Krantz
Middle Tennessee Blue Raiders	CUSA	Derek Mason	2024	12	23	.343	39	78	.333	Anthony Scelfo	Brian Stewart	Cam Curtis
Missouri State Bears	CUSA	Casey Woods	2026	4	7	.364	4	7	.364	Mark Cala	Jack Curtis	Sparky Woods
New Mexico State Aggies	CUSA	Tony Sanchez	2024	10	25	.286	30	65	.316	David Yost	Joe Morris	Chili Davis
Sam Houston Bearkats	CUSA	Freddie Aughtry-Lindsay / Eric Raisbeck (co-interim)	2026	0	3	.000	0	3	.000	Zack Patterson	Freddie Aughtry-Lindsay	Eric Raisbeck
Western Kentucky Hilltoppers	CUSA	Tyson Helton	2019	62	42	.596	62	42	.596	Joe Bernardi / Bodie Reeder	Davis Merritt	Andy LaRussa
Notre Dame Fighting Irish	Independent	Marcus Freeman	2022	53	13	.803	53	13	.803	Mike Denbrock	Chris Ash / Aaron Henry	Marty Biagi
UConn Huskies	Independent	Jason Candle	2026	6	5	.545	87	49	.640	Marquel Blackwell / Nunzio Campanile	Ryan Manalac	Pat Cashmore
Akron Zips	MAC	Joe Moorhead	2022	15	44	.254	29	56	.341	Joe Moorhead	Tim Tibesar	Ryan Matviko
Ball State Cardinals	MAC	Mike Uremovich	2025	7	16	.304	7	16	.304	Mike Uremovich	Jeff Knowles	Nick Fiacable
Bowling Green Falcons	MAC	Eddie George	2025	7	16	.304	7	16	.304	Greg Nosal	Joe Bowden	Greg Froelich
Buffalo Bulls	MAC	Pete Lembo	2024	22	14	.611	55	43	.561	Tony Tokarz	Brian Dougherty	Garrett McLaughlin
Central Michigan Chippewas	MAC	Matt Drinkall	2025	12	12	.500	12	12	.500	Jim Chapin / Derek Fulton	Sean Cronin	Keith Murphy
Eastern Michigan Eagles	MAC	Chris Creighton	2014	65	90	.419	65	90	.419	Mike Piatkowski	Tate Omli / Kasey Teegardin	Justin Parbs
Kent State Golden Flashes	MAC	Mark Carney	2025	8	15	.348	8	15	.348	Clay Patterson	Cherokee Valeria	Vacant
Miami RedHawks	MAC	Chuck Martin	2014	79	78	.503	79	78	.503	Gus Ragland	Bill Brechin	Johnny Aylward
Ohio Bobcats	MAC	John Hauser	2025	9	3	.750	9	3	.750	Scott Isphording	Kurt Mattix	Blair Cavanaugh
Sacramento State Hornets	MAC	Alonzo Carter	2026	2	9	.182	2	9	.182	Eric Kiesau / Eric Scott	Adam Clark / Kenwick Thompson	Nick Alaimalo / Milo Austin
Toledo Rockets	MAC	Mike Jacobs	2026	9	2	.818	9	2	.818	Cris Reisert	Jahmal Brown	Matt Ulrich
UMass Minutemen	MAC	Joe Harasymiak	2025	5	18	.217	5	18	.217	Max Warner	Jared Keyte	Joe Castellitto
Western Michigan Broncos	MAC	Lance Taylor	2023	28	22	.560	28	22	.560	Walt Bell	Greer Martini / Duane Vaughn	Dan Sabock
Air Force Falcons	Mountain West	Troy Calhoun	2007	148	99	.599	148	99	.599	Mike Thiessen	Steve Russ	Tim Horton
Hawaiʻi Rainbow Warriors	Mountain West	Timmy Chang	2022	25	37	.403	25	37	.403	Anthony Arceneaux	Dennis Thurman	Thomas Sheffield
Nevada Wolf Pack	Mountain West	Jeff Choate	2024	11	25	.306	11	25	.306	Bret Bartalone	Kane Ioane	Parker Henry
New Mexico Lobos	Mountain West	Jason Eck	2025	18	6	.750	18	6	.750	Luke Schleusner	Spence Nowinsky	Erik Link
North Dakota State Bison	Mountain West	Tim Polasek	2024	35	5	.875	9	2	.818	Dan Larson	Grant Olson	Carlton Littlejohn
Northern Illinois Huskies	Mountain West	Rob Harley (interim)	2026	0	11	.000	0	11	.000	Tony Petersen	D. J. Bland	Cory Connolly
San Jose State Spartans	Mountain West	Ken Niumatalolo	2024	15	22	.405	124	105	.541	Craig Stutzmann	Bojay Filimoeatu	Fred Guidici
UNLV Rebels	Mountain West	Dan Mullen	2025	17	8	.680	120	69	.635	Corey Dennis	Paul Guenther	Mitch Singler
UTEP Miners	Mountain West	Kyle Beyer (interim)	2026	0	1	.000	0	1	.000	Joe Pappalardo / Lanear Sampson	Kyle Beyer / Kelvin Sigler	Payton Pardee
Wyoming Cowboys	Mountain West	Jay Sawvel	2024	14	21	.400	14	21	.400	Christian Taylor	Aaron Bohl	Shannon Moore
Boise State Broncos	Pac-12	Spencer Danielson	2023	33	10	.767	33	10	.767	Nate Potter	Erik Chinander	Stacy Collins
Colorado State Rams	Pac-12	Jim Mora	2026	3	8	.273	76	61	.555	Pryce Tracy	Kenny McClendon	Kyle Krantz
Fresno State Bulldogs	Pac-12	Matt Entz	2025	15	9	.625	15	9	.625	Josh Davis	Nick Benedetto	John Baxter
Oregon State Beavers	Pac-12	JaMarcus Shephard	2026	6	5	.545	6	5	.545	Mitch Dahlen	Mike MacIntyre	Ricky Brumfield
San Diego State Aztecs	Pac-12	Sean Lewis	2024	17	18	.486	41	49	.456	Sean Lewis	Demetrius Sumler	Zac Barton
Texas State Bobcats	Pac-12	G. J. Kinne	2023	30	20	.600	30	20	.600	Landon Keopple	Will Windham	Tanner Burns
Utah State Aggies	Pac-12	Bronco Mendenhall	2025	10	14	.417	150	102	.595	Robert Anae	Nick Howell	Shane Hunter
Washington State Cougars	Pac-12	Kirby Moore	2026	2	9	.182	2	9	.182	Matt Miller	Trent Bray	Derek Sage
Alabama Crimson Tide	SEC	Kalen DeBoer	2024	29	10	.744	66	19	.776	Ryan Grubb	Maurice Linguist / Kane Wommack	Jay Nunez
Arkansas Razorbacks	SEC	Ryan Silverfield	2026	4	7	.364	54	32	.628	Tim Cramsey	Ron Roberts	Chad Lunsford
Auburn Tigers	SEC	Alex Golesh	2026	7	4	.636	30	19	.612	Kodi Burns / Joel Gordon	D.J. Durkin	Jacob Bronowski
Florida Gators	SEC	Jon Sumrall	2026	7	4	.636	50	16	.758	Buster Faulkner	Brad White	Johnathan Galante
Georgia Bulldogs	SEC	Kirby Smart	2016	127	22	.852	127	22	.852	Mike Bobo	Travaris Robinson / Glenn Schumann	Kirk Benedict
Kentucky Wildcats	SEC	Will Stein	2026	7	4	.636	7	4	.636	Joe Sloan	Jay Bateman	Parker Fleming
LSU Tigers	SEC	Lane Kiffin	2026	6	5	.545	122	57	.682	Charlie Weis Jr.	Blake Baker	Joe Houston
Mississippi State Bulldogs	SEC	Jeff Lebby	2024	12	24	.333	12	24	.333	Jeff Lebby	Zach Arnett / Matt Brock	Cliff Odom Jr.
Missouri Tigers	SEC	Eli Drinkwitz	2020	53	33	.616	65	34	.657	Chip Lindsey	Corey Batoon / Derek Nicholson	John Papuchis
Oklahoma Sooners	SEC	Brent Venables	2022	39	24	.619	39	24	.619	Ben Arbuckle	Todd Bates	Doug Deakin
Ole Miss Rebels	SEC	Pete Golding	2025	9	5	.643	9	5	.643	John David Baker	Bryan Brown	Jake Schoonover
South Carolina Gamecocks	SEC	Shane Beamer	2021	39	35	.527	39	35	.527	Kendal Briles	Torrian Gray / Clayton White	Matthew Smiley
Tennessee Volunteers	SEC	Josh Heupel	2021	54	22	.711	82	30	.732	Joey Halzle	Jim Knowles	Evan Crabtree
Texas Longhorns	SEC	Steve Sarkisian	2021	55	22	.714	101	57	.639	Kyle Flood	Will Muschamp / Johnny Nansen	Jeff Banks
Texas A&M Aggies	SEC	Mike Elko	2024	23	14	.622	39	23	.629	Holmon Wiggins	Lyle Hemphill / Elijah Robinson	Patrick Dougherty
Vanderbilt Commodores	SEC	Clark Lea	2021	30	41	.423	30	41	.423	Tim Beck	Steve Gregory	Jeff LePak
Appalachian State Mountaineers	Sun Belt	Dowell Loggains	2025	12	12	.500	12	12	.500	Mike Anthony	D. J. Smith	Tyler Zielenski
Arkansas State Red Wolves	Sun Belt	Jalen Ortiz (interim)	2021	0	1	.000	0	1	.000	Garrett Altman	Griffin McCarley	Kody Schexneyder
Coastal Carolina Chanticleers	Sun Belt	Ryan Beard	2026	4	7	.364	11	12	.478	Nick Petrino	LD Scott	Nelson Fishback
Georgia Southern Eagles	Sun Belt	Clay Helton	2022	34	29	.540	80	53	.602	Ryan Aplin	Mike Mutz	Blake Wilson
Georgia State Panthers	Sun Belt	Dell McGee	2024	9	26	.257	9	26	.257	Hue Jackson	Cam Clark / John Haneline	Zach Conowal / Troy Kruchten
James Madison Dukes	Sun Belt	Billy Napier	2026	8	3	.727	70	38	.648	Cam Aiken	Robert Bala / Josh Linam	Rob Wenger
Louisiana Ragin' Cajuns	Sun Belt	Michael Desormeaux	2022	37	28	.569	37	28	.569	Tim Leger	Jim Salgado	Mike Giuliani
Louisiana–Monroe Warhawks	Sun Belt	Bryant Vincent	2024	10	25	.286	17	31	.354	Jesse Montalto	Troy Reffett	Tony McClain
Louisiana Tech Bulldogs	Sun Belt	Sonny Cumbie	2022	28	33	.459	30	36	.455	Nathan Young	Luke Olson	Dan Sharp
Marshall Thundering Herd	Sun Belt	Tony Gibson	2025	11	12	.478	11	12	.478	Rod Smith	Brad Lambert	Jackson White
Old Dominion Monarchs	Sun Belt	Ricky Rahne	2020	33	40	.452	33	40	.452	Kody Cook / Alex Huettel	Blake Seiler	Kevin Smith
South Alabama Jaguars	Sun Belt	Major Applewhite	2024	17	19	.472	32	30	.516	Major Applewhite	Todd Orlando / Jason Washington	Tre Williams
Southern Miss Golden Eagles	Sun Belt	Blake Anderson	2025	3	9	.250	77	63	.550	Kyle Cefalo	Joe Bolden	Bobby Dodd
Troy Trojans	Sun Belt	Gerad Parker	2024	16	21	.432	16	27	.372	Adam Austin	Dontae Wright	Tyler Hancock

== See also ==
- List of current NCAA Division I FCS football coaches
- List of current NCAA Division I baseball coaches
- List of current NCAA Division I men's basketball coaches
- List of current NCAA Division I women's basketball coaches
- List of current NCAA Division I men's ice hockey coaches
- List of NCAA Division I men's soccer coaches
