= 2026 Sam Houston Bearkats football team =

American college football season

2026 Sam Houston Bearkats football
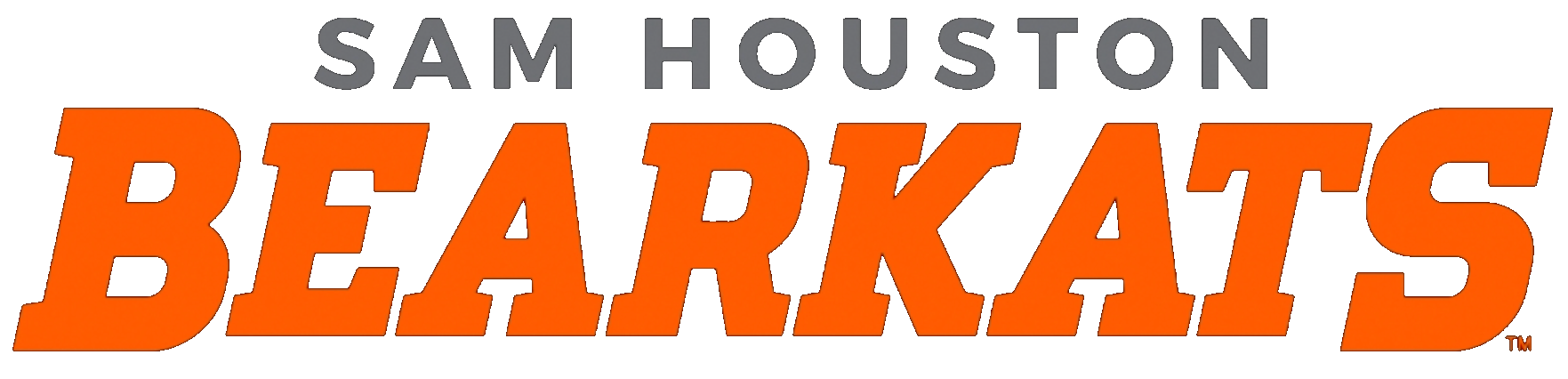
- Conference: Conference USA
- Record: 1–10 (0–7 CUSA)
- Head coach: Phil Longo (2nd season; first 8 games); Eric Raisbeck (co-interim; remainder of the season); Freddie Aughtry-Lindsay (co-interim: remainder of the season)
- Offensive coordinator: Zack Patterson (2nd season)
- Offensive scheme: Air raid
- Defensive coordinator: Freddie Aughtry-Lindsay (2nd season)
- Base defense: 3–3–5
- Home stadium: Bowers Stadium

2026 Conference USA football standings
| | Conf. | | | Overall |
| Team | W | | L | W | | L |
|---|---|---|---|---|---|---|
| Liberty y | 7 | – | 0 | 9 | – | 1 |
| Jacksonville State y | 6 | – | 1 | 8 | – | 3 |
| Kennesaw State | 4 | – | 3 | 5 | – | 6 |
| Middle Tennessee | 4 | – | 3 | 6 | – | 5 |
| Delaware | 4 | – | 3 | 6 | – | 5 |
| Western Kentucky | 3 | – | 4 | 4 | – | 7 |
| Missouri State | 3 | – | 4 | 4 | – | 7 |
| FIU | 2 | – | 5 | 4 | – | 7 |
| New Mexico State | 2 | – | 5 | 3 | – | 8 |
| Sam Houston | 0 | – | 7 | 1 | – | 10 |
Championship: Jacksonville State at Liberty
y – Championship game participant; As of November 22, 2026; Rankings from AP poll

The 2026 Sam Houston Bearkats football team represents Sam Houston State University during the 2026 NCAA Division I FBS football season as a member of Conference USA. The Bearkats play their home games at Bowers Stadium, located in Huntsville, Texas.

Head coach Phil Longo led the Bearkats in his second season before he was fired after a 1–7 start on October 28, the day after a 24–3 loss to Missouri State. Associate head coach Eric Raisbeck and defensive coordinator Freddie Aughtry-Lindsay were named co-interim head coaches for the remainder of the season.

== Schedule ==
| Date | Time | Opponent | Site | TV | Result | Attendance |
|---|---|---|---|---|---|---|
| September 5 | 6:00 p.m. | at Troy* | Veterans Memorial Stadium; Troy, AL | ESPN+ | L 21–24 | 24,356 |
| September 12 | 6:00 p.m. | Tulsa* | Bowers Stadium; Huntsville, TX | ESPN+ | L 17–23 | 13,781 |
| September 19 | 6:00 p.m. | Nicholls*^{†} | Bowers Stadium; Huntsville, TX | ESPN+ | W 59–0 | 12,182 |
| September 26 | 11:00 a.m. | at No. 11 Texas Tech* | Galaxy Stadium; Lubbock, TX | TNT/truTV | L 14–49 | 59,704 |
| October 8 | 6:00 p.m. | at Liberty | Williams Stadium; Lynchburg, VA | ESPNU | L 3–35 | 15,335 |
| October 14 | 7:00 p.m. | Western Kentucky | Bowers Stadium; Huntsville, TX | ESPN2 | L 3–16 | 7,291 |
| October 21 | 7:00 p.m. | New Mexico State | Bowers Stadium; Huntsville, TX | ESPN2 | L 24–30 | 8,577 |
| October 27 | 7:00 p.m. | at Missouri State | Robert W. Plaster Stadium; Springfield, MO | ESPN2 | L 3–24 | 11,119 |
| November 7 | 6:00 p.m. | at Jacksonville State | AmFirst Stadium; Jacksonville, AL | CBSSN | L 14–47 | 20,476 |
| November 14 | 1:00 p.m. | Kennesaw State | Bowers Stadium; Huntsville, TX | ESPN+ | L 7–26 | 11,574 |
| November 21 | 1:00 p.m. | Middle Tennessee | Bowers Stadium; Huntsville, TX | ESPN+ | L 28–31 | 7,432 |
| November 28 | 1:00 p.m. | at FIU | Pitbull Stadium; Miami, FL | ESPN+ | | |
*Non-conference game; ^{†}Homecoming; Rankings from AP Poll (and CFP Rankings, after November 4) - Released prior to game; All times are in Central time

== Game summaries ==
=== At Troy ===
Sam Houston Bearkats (0–0) at Troy Trojans (0–0) – Game summary

| Quarter | 1 | 2 | 3 | 4 | Total |
|---|---|---|---|---|---|
| Bearkats | 7 | 7 | 0 | 7 | 21 |
| Trojans | 7 | 7 | 3 | 7 | 24 |

at Veterans Memorial Stadium, Troy, Alabama

- Date: September 5
- Game time: 6:00 p.m. CDT
- Game weather: Sunny • Temperature: 83 °F (28 °C) • Wind: SW at 4 mph
- Game attendance: 24,356
- Referee: Ron Hudson
- TV announcers (ESPN+): Will Kollmeyer, Ben Stanfield and Rosie Langello
- Box score, Recap

Game information
First quarter
- SHSU – Grady O'Neill 14-yard pass from Landyn Locke (Sam Carpenter kick), 7:47. Bearkats 7–0. Drive: 6 plays, 83 yards, 2:32.
- TROY – Fabian Rogosch 19-yard pass from Goose Crowder (Ethan Head kick), 4:06. Tied 7–7. Drive: 9 plays, 75 yards, 3:41.

Second quarter

- TROY – TK Keyes 28-yard pass from Goose Crowder (Ethan Head kick), 14:54. Trojans 14–7. Drive: 6 plays, 72 yards, 2:13.
- SHSU – Darrick Bledsoe III 14-yard pass from Landyn Locke (Sam Carpenter kick), 11:59. Tied 14–14. Drive: 6 plays, 75 yards, 2:55.

Third quarter

- TROY – Ethan Head 32-yard field goal, 14:11. Trojans 17–14. Drive: 4 plays, 0 yards, 0:41.

Fourth quarter

- TROY – TJ Lott 18-yard pass from Goose Crowder (Ethan Head kick), 10:42. Trojans 24–14. Drive: 9 plays, 87 yards, 4:35.
- SHSU – Chris Reed 31-yard pass from Landyn Locke (Sam Carpenter kick), 1:03. Trojans 24–21. Drive: 9 plays, 85 yards, 3:17.

| Statistics | SHSU | TROY |
|---|---|---|
| First downs | 22 | 18 |
| Plays–yards | 84–373 | 66–342 |
| Rushes–yards | 24–38 | 42–177 |
| Passing yards | 335 | 165 |
| Passing: comp–att–int | 30–46–1 | 12–24–0 |
| Turnovers | 1 | 0 |
| Time of possession | 30:51 | 29:09 |

| Team | Category | Player | Statistics |
|---|---|---|---|
| Sam Houston | Passing | Landyn Locke | 30/46, 335 yards, 3 TD, INT |
| Sam Houston | Rushing | Alton McCaskill | 13 carries, 51 yards |
| Sam Houston | Receiving | Grady O'Neill | 7 receptions, 86 yards, TD |
| Troy | Passing | Goose Crowder | 12/24, 165 yards, 3 TD |
| Troy | Rushing | Gavin Griffin | 16 carries, 81 yards |
| Troy | Receiving | TK Keyes | 2 receptions, 48 yards, TD |

=== Tulsa ===
Tulsa Golden Hurricane (1–0) at Sam Houston Bearkats (0–1) – Game summary

| Quarter | 1 | 2 | 3 | 4 | Total |
|---|---|---|---|---|---|
| Golden Hurricane | 0 | 10 | 13 | 0 | 23 |
| Bearkats | 7 | 7 | 3 | 0 | 17 |

at Bowers Stadium, Huntsville, Texas

- Date: September 12
- Game time: 6:00 p.m. CDT
- Game weather: Sunny • Temperature: 95 °F (35 °C) • Wind: SE at 8 MPH
- Game attendance: 13,781
- Referee: Matt Overton
- TV announcers (ESPN+): Jason Metko, John Harris, and Kendra Sheehan
- Box score, Recap

Game information

First quarter

- SHSU – Chris Reed 39-yard pass from Landyn Locke (Sam Carpenter kick), 12:02. Bearkats 7–0. Drive: 6 plays, 75 yards, 2:58.

Second quarter

- TLSA – Trequan Jones 3-yard run (Owen Carey kick), 13:57. Tied 7–7. Drive: 8 plays, 62 yards, 2:37.
- SHSU – Jerrian Parker Jr. 94-yard pass from Landyn Locke (Sam Carpenter kick), 6:48. Bearkats 14–7. Drive: 1 play, 94 yards, 0:12.
- TLSA – Owen Carey 41-yard field goal, 2:12. Bearkats 14–10. Drive: 11 plays, 44 yards, 4:31.

Third quarter

- TLSA – Tristan Lawyer 56-yard run (kick failed), 10:10. Golden Hurricane 16–14. Drive: 11 plays, 80 yards, 4:46.
- TLSA – Trequan Jones 81-yard run (Owen Carey kick), 7:22. Golden Hurricane 23–14. Drive: 2 plays, 89 yards, 0:25.
- SHSU – Sam Carpenter 39-yard field goal, 1:02. Golden Hurricane 23–17. Drive: 13 plays, 59 yards, 6:14.

Fourth quarter

- No scoring plays.

| Statistics | TLSA | SHSU |
|---|---|---|
| First downs | 18 | 19 |
| Plays–yards | 73–367 | 66–371 |
| Rushes–yards | 40–241 | 31–55 |
| Passing yards | 126 | 316 |
| Passing: comp–att–int | 16–33–0 | 24–35–0 |
| Turnovers | 0 | 1 |
| Time of possession | 30:18 | 29:42 |

| Team | Category | Player | Statistics |
|---|---|---|---|
| Tulsa | Passing | Baylor Hayes | 16/29, 126 yards |
| Tulsa | Rushing | Trequan Jones | 9 carries, 125 yards, 2 TD |
| Tulsa | Receiving | Damari Alston | 5 receptions, 39 yards |
| Sam Houston | Passing | Landyn Locke | 24/34, 316 yards, 2 TD |
| Sam Houston | Rushing | Alton McCaskill | 14 carries, 48 yards |
| Sam Houston | Receiving | Jerrian Parker Jr. | 2 receptions, 101 yards, TD |

=== Nicholls (FCS) ===
Nicholls Colonels (FCS) (2–1) at Sam Houston Bearkats (0–2) – Game summary

| Quarter | 1 | 2 | 3 | 4 | Total |
|---|---|---|---|---|---|
| Colonels (FCS) | 0 | 0 | 0 | 0 | 0 |
| Bearkats | 10 | 21 | 21 | 7 | 59 |

at Bowers Stadium, Huntsville, Texas

- Date: September 19
- Game time: 6:00 p.m. CDT
- Game weather: Sunny • Temperature: 90 °F (32 °C) • Wind: SE at 7 mph
- Game attendance: 12,182
- Referee: Jeremee Tate
- TV announcers (ESPN+): Randy McIlvoy, John Harris, and Kendra Sheehan
- Box score, Recap

Game information

First quarter

- SHSU – Tim Burns Jr. 65-yard pass from Landyn Locke (Sam Carpenter kick), 10:55. Bearkats 7–0. Drive: 3 plays, 69 yards, 1:16.
- SHSU – Sam Carpenter 33-yard field goal, 4:39. Bearkats 10–0. Drive: 5 plays, 25 yards, 2:36.

Second quarter

- SHSU – Grady O'Neill 3-yard pass from Landyn Locke (Sam Carpenter kick), 10:55. Bearkats 17–0. Drive: 6 plays, 82 yards, 1:58.
- SHSU – Landan Brown 5-yard run (Sam Carpenter kick), 6:44. Bearkats 24–0. Drive: 4 plays, 23 yards, 1:00.
- SHSU – Darrick Bledsoe III 11-yard pass from Landyn Locke (Sam Carpenter kick), 2:03. Bearkats 31–0. Drive: 8 plays, 75 yards, 3:25.

Third quarter

- SHSU – Kamari Maxwell 48-yard pass from Landyn Locke (Sam Carpenter kick), 14:27. Bearkats 38–0. Drive: 2 plays, 59 yards, 0:26.
- SHSU – Alton McCaskill 5-yard run (Sam Carpenter kick), 5:14. Bearkats 45–0. Drive: 14 plays, 80 yards, 7:56.
- SHSU – Kyan Berry-Johnson 61-yard pass from Brett Holloway (Sam Carpenter kick), 2:19. Bearkats 52–0. Drive: 3 plays, 70 yards, 1:27.

Fourth quarter

- SHSU – Brett Holloway 10-yard run (Sam Carpenter kick), 4:45. Bearkats 59–0. Drive: 10 plays, 55 yards, 5:56.

| Statistics | NICH | SHSU |
|---|---|---|
| First downs | 10 | 26 |
| Plays–yards | 59–163 | 75–619 |
| Rushes–yards | 36–124 | 43–233 |
| Passing yards | 39 | 386 |
| Passing: comp–att–int | 7–23–2 | 22–32–0 |
| Turnovers | 3 | 0 |
| Time of possession | 24:29 | 35:31 |

| Team | Category | Player | Statistics |
|---|---|---|---|
| Nicholls | Passing | Ean Rodrigue | 7/21, 39 yards, 2 INT |
| Nicholls | Rushing | Tamaj Hoffman | 9 carries, 56 yards |
| Nicholls | Receiving | Jordan Smith | 2 receptions, 21 yards |
| Sam Houston | Passing | Landyn Locke | 19/28, 322 yards, 4 TD |
| Sam Houston | Rushing | Jerrian Parker Jr. | 6 carries, 52 yards |
| Sam Houston | Receiving | Kamari Maxwell | 2 receptions, 86 yards, TD |

=== At No. 11 Texas Tech ===
Sam Houston Bearkats (1–2) at No. 11 Texas Tech Red Raiders (3–0) – Game summary

| Quarter | 1 | 2 | 3 | 4 | Total |
|---|---|---|---|---|---|
| Bearkats | 0 | 14 | 0 | 0 | 14 |
| No. 11 Red Raiders | 7 | 14 | 14 | 14 | 49 |

at Galaxy Stadium, Lubbock, Texas

- Date: September 26
- Game time: 11:00 a.m. CDT
- Game weather: Sunny • Temperature: 78 °F (26 °C) • Wind: SW 10 mph
- Game attendance: 59,704
- Referee: Cravonne Barrett
- TV announcers (TNT/truTV/HBO Max): J. B. Long, Mike Golic Jr., and Allie LaForce
- Box score, Recap

Game information
First quarter
- TTU – Cameron Dickey 1-yard run (Stone Harrington kick), 5:11. Red Raiders 7–0. Drive: 8 plays, 70 yards, 3:16.

Second quarter

- TTU – Austin Romaine 15-yard interception return (Stone Harrington kick), 14:54. Red Raiders 14–0.
- TTU – Austin Romaine 31-yard interception return (Stone Harrington kick), 14:52. Red Raiders 21–0.
- SHSU – Tim Burns Jr. 52-yard pass from Landyn Locke (Sam Carpenter kick), 8:17. Red Raiders 21–7. Drive: 2 plays, 64 yards, 1:47.
- SHSU – Chris Reed 9-yard pass from Landyn Locke (Sam Carpenter kick), 1:56. Red Raiders 21–14. Drive: 2 plays, 4 yards, 0:25.

Third quarter

- TTU – Cameron Dickey 13-yard run (Stone Harrington kick), 13:42. Red Raiders 28–14. Drive: 3 plays, 32 yards, 1:08.
- TTU – Coy Eakin 21-yard pass from Will Hammond (Stone Harrington kick), 10:33. Red Raiders 35–14. Drive: 5 plays, 53 yards, 1:41.

Fourth quarter

- TTU – Will Hammond 23-yard run (Stone Harrington kick), 10:41. Red Raiders 42–14. Drive: 7 plays, 80 yards, 1:56.
- TTU – Malcolm Simmons 27-yard pass from Tommy Castellanos (Stone Harrington kick), 4:49. Red Raiders 49–14. Drive: 9 plays, 36 yards, 3:21.

| Statistics | SHSU | TTU |
|---|---|---|
| First downs | 11 | 24 |
| Total yards | 269 | 470 |
| Rushing yards | 74 | 219 |
| Passing yards | 195 | 251 |
| Turnovers | 3 | 4 |
| Time of possession | 35:06 | 24:54 |

| Team | Category | Player | Statistics |
|---|---|---|---|
| Sam Houston | Passing | Landyn Locke | 23/37, 195 yards, 2 TD, 2 INT |
| Sam Houston | Rushing | Alton McCaskill | 8 rushes, 25 yards |
| Sam Houston | Receiving | Tim Burns Jr. | 2 receptions, 61 yards, TD |
| Texas Tech | Passing | Will Hammond | 17/29, 224 yards, TD, 3 INT |
| Texas Tech | Rushing | Cameron Dickey | 12 rushes, 91 yards, 2 TD |
| Texas Tech | Receiving | Kenny Johnson | 3 receptions, 60 yards |

=== At Liberty ===
Sam Houston Bearkats (1–3) at Liberty Flames (4–1) – Game summary

| Quarter | 1 | 2 | 3 | 4 | Total |
|---|---|---|---|---|---|
| Bearkats | 0 | 3 | 0 | 0 | 3 |
| Flames | 7 | 7 | 7 | 14 | 35 |

at Williams Stadium • Lynchburg, Virginia

- Date: October 8
- Game time: 6:00 p.m. CDT / 7:00 p.m. EDT
- Game weather: Sunny • Temperature: 72 °F (22 °C) • Wind: NW 2 MPH
- Game attendance: 15,335
- Referee: Jeremee Tate
- TV announcers (ESPNU): Tiffany Greene (play-by-play) and Jay Walker (analyst)
- Box score, Recap

| Statistics | SHSU | LIB |
|---|---|---|
| First downs | 13 | 22 |
| Plays–yards | 59–243 | 53–411 |
| Rushes–yards | 29–105 | 39–297 |
| Passing yards | 138 | 114 |
| Passing: comp–att–int | 20–30–0 | 10–14–0 |
| Turnovers | 0 | 0 |
| Time of possession | 29:04 | 30:56 |

| Team | Category | Player | Statistics |
|---|---|---|---|
| Sam Houston | Passing | Landyn Locke | 20/30, 138 yards |
| Sam Houston | Rushing | MJ Dowdy | 11 carries, 42 yards |
| Sam Houston | Receiving | Grady O'Neill | 3 receptions, 39 yards |
| Liberty | Passing | Deshawn Purdie | 10/14, 114 yards, TD |
| Liberty | Rushing | Jaylon Coleman | 7 carries, 92 yards |
| Liberty | Receiving | Makai Jackson | 3 receptions, 46 yards |

=== Western Kentucky ===
Western Kentucky Hilltoppers (2–4) at Sam Houston Bearkats (1–4) – Game summary

| Quarter | 1 | 2 | 3 | 4 | Total |
|---|---|---|---|---|---|
| Hilltoppers | 7 | 3 | 3 | 3 | 16 |
| Bearkats | 0 | 3 | 0 | 0 | 3 |

at Bowers Stadium • Huntsville, Texas

- Date: October 14
- Game time: 7:00 p.m. CDT
- Game attendance: 7,291
- TV: ESPN2
- Box score, Recap

| Statistics | WKU | SHSU |
|---|---|---|
| First downs | | |
| Total yards | | |
| Rushing yards | | |
| Passing yards | | |
| Turnovers | | |
| Time of possession | | |

| Team | Category | Player | Statistics |
|---|---|---|---|
| Western Kentucky | Passing | | |
| Western Kentucky | Rushing | | |
| Western Kentucky | Receiving | | |
| Sam Houston | Passing | | |
| Sam Houston | Rushing | | |
| Sam Houston | Receiving | | |

=== New Mexico State ===
New Mexico State Aggies (2–4) at Sam Houston Bearkats (1–5) – Game summary

| Quarter | 1 | 2 | 3 | 4 | Total |
|---|---|---|---|---|---|
| Aggies | 0 | 14 | 16 | 0 | 30 |
| Bearkats | 7 | 3 | 7 | 7 | 24 |

at Bowers Stadium • Huntsville, Texas

- Date: October 21
- Game time: 7:00 p.m. CDT
- Game attendance: 8,577
- TV: ESPN2
- Box score, Recap

| Statistics | NMSU | SHSU |
|---|---|---|
| First downs | | |
| Total yards | | |
| Rushing yards | | |
| Passing yards | | |
| Turnovers | | |
| Time of possession | | |

| Team | Category | Player | Statistics |
|---|---|---|---|
| New Mexico State | Passing | | |
| New Mexico State | Rushing | | |
| New Mexico State | Receiving | | |
| Sam Houston | Passing | | |
| Sam Houston | Rushing | | |
| Sam Houston | Receiving | | |

=== At Missouri State ===
Sam Houston Bearkats (1–6) at Missouri State Bears (2–5) – Game summary

| Quarter | 1 | 2 | 3 | 4 | Total |
|---|---|---|---|---|---|
| Bearkats | 3 | 0 | 0 | 0 | 3 |
| Bears | 7 | 3 | 0 | 14 | 24 |

at Robert W. Plaster Stadium • Springfield, Missouri

- Date: October 27
- Game time: 7:00 p.m. CDT
- Game attendance: 11,119
- TV: ESPN2
- Box score, Recap

Game information

First quarter
Second quarter
Third quarter
Fourth quarter

| Statistics | SHSU | MOST |
|---|---|---|
| First downs | | |
| Total yards | | |
| Rushing yards | | |
| Passing yards | | |
| Passing: comp–att–int | | |
| Turnovers | | |
| Time of possession | | |

| Team | Category | Player | Statistics |
|---|---|---|---|
| Sam Houston | Passing | | |
| Sam Houston | Rushing | | |
| Sam Houston | Receiving | | |
| Missouri State | Passing | | |
| Missouri State | Rushing | | |
| Missouri State | Receiving | | |

=== At Jacksonville State ===
Sam Houston Bearkats (1–7) at Jacksonville State Gamecocks (6–2) – Game summary

| Quarter | 1 | 2 | 3 | 4 | Total |
|---|---|---|---|---|---|
| Bearkats | 0 | 0 | 7 | 7 | 14 |
| Gamecocks | 0 | 17 | 7 | 23 | 47 |

at AmFirst Stadium • Jacksonville, Alabama

- Date: November 7
- Game time: 6:00 p.m. CST
- Game weather: Sunny • Temperature: 59 °F (15 °C) • Wind: NW at 10 miles per hour (16 km/h)
- Game attendance: 20,476
- Referee: Reed Brotherton
- TV announcers (CBSSN): Alex Del Barrio (play-by-play) and Emory Hunt (analyst)
- Box score, Recap

Game information

First quarter

- No scoring plays.

Second quarter

- JVST – Jamill Williams 31-yard pass from Caden Creel (Garrison Rippa kick), 8:35. Jacksonville State 7–0. Drive: 3 plays, 63 yards, 1:36.
- JVST – Garrison Rippa 45-yard field goal, 3:18. Jacksonville State 10–0. Drive: 7 plays, 29 yards, 3:06.
- JVST – Jalen Likely 8-yard run (Garrison Rippa kick), 0:25. Jacksonville State 17–0. Drive: 4 plays, 54 yards, 1:17.

Third quarter

- JVST – Deondre Johnson 67-yard pass from Caden Creel (Garrison Rippa kick), 14:20. Jacksonville State 24–0. Drive: 2 plays, 67 yards, 0:40.
- SHSU – Chris Reed 64-yard pass from Landyn Locke (Sam Carpenter kick), 13:43. Jacksonville State 24–7. Drive: 2 plays, 75 yards, 0:37.

Fourth quarter

- JVST – Caden Creel 4-yard run (Garrison Rippa kick), 14:10. Jacksonville State 31–7. Drive: 9 plays, 75 yards, 4:03.
- JVST – Landyn Locke sacked in the end zone by Jacob Cruz for a safety, 12:20. Jacksonville State 33–7.
- JVST – Jamill Williams 85-yard kickoff return (Garrison Rippa kick), 12:09. Jacksonville State 40–7. Drive: 1 play, 85 yards, 0:00.
- SHSU – Grady O'Neill 7-yard pass from DJ Bailey (Sam Carpenter kick), 7:21. Jacksonville State 40–14. Drive: 10 plays, 75 yards, 4:48.
- JVST – Jacob Cornejo 1-yard run (Conor Donaghy kick), 0:34. Jacksonville State 47–14. Drive: 10 plays, 75 yards, 6:46.

| Statistics | SHSU | JVST |
|---|---|---|
| First downs | 13 | 25 |
| Total yards | 254 | 479 |
| Rushing yards | 65 | 197 |
| Passing yards | 189 | 282 |
| Turnovers | 0 | 0 |
| Time of possession | 27:00 | 33:00 |

| Team | Category | Player | Statistics |
|---|---|---|---|
| Sam Houston | Passing | Landyn Locke | 16/21, 126 yards, TD |
| Sam Houston | Rushing | Landan Brown | 10 carries, 50 yards |
| Sam Houston | Receiving | Chris Reed | 6 receptions, 80 yards, TD |
| Jacksonville State | Passing | Caden Creel | 18/28, 246 yards, 2 TD |
| Jacksonville State | Rushing | Caden Creel | 13 carries, 87 yards, TD |
| Jacksonville State | Receiving | Darius Cannon | 4 receptions, 74 yards |

=== Kennesaw State ===
Kennesaw State Owls (3–6) at Sam Houston Bearkats (1–8) – Game summary

| Quarter | 1 | 2 | 3 | 4 | Total |
|---|---|---|---|---|---|
| Owls | 0 | 0 | 0 | 0 | 0 |
| Bearkats | 0 | 0 | 0 | 0 | 0 |

at Bowers Stadium • Huntsville, Texas

- Date: November 14
- Game time: 1:00 p.m. CST
- TV: ESPN+

| Statistics | KENN | SHSU |
|---|---|---|
| First downs | | |
| Total yards | | |
| Rushing yards | | |
| Passing yards | | |
| Turnovers | | |
| Time of possession | | |

| Team | Category | Player | Statistics |
|---|---|---|---|
| Kennesaw State | Passing | | |
| Kennesaw State | Rushing | | |
| Kennesaw State | Receiving | | |
| Sam Houston | Passing | | |
| Sam Houston | Rushing | | |
| Sam Houston | Receiving | | |

=== Middle Tennessee ===
Middle Tennessee Blue Raiders (5–5) at Sam Houston Bearkats (1–9) – Game summary

| Quarter | 1 | 2 | 3 | 4 | Total |
|---|---|---|---|---|---|
| Blue Raiders | 0 | 0 | 0 | 0 | 0 |
| Bearkats | 0 | 0 | 0 | 0 | 0 |

at Bowers Stadium • Huntsville, Texas

- Date: November 21
- Game time: 1:00 p.m. CST
- TV: ESPN+

| Statistics | MTSU | SHSU |
|---|---|---|
| First downs | | |
| Total yards | | |
| Rushing yards | | |
| Passing yards | | |
| Turnovers | | |
| Time of possession | | |

| Team | Category | Player | Statistics |
|---|---|---|---|
| Middle Tennessee | Passing | | |
| Middle Tennessee | Rushing | | |
| Middle Tennessee | Receiving | | |
| Sam Houston | Passing | | |
| Sam Houston | Rushing | | |
| Sam Houston | Receiving | | |

=== At FIU ===
Sam Houston Bearkats (0–0) at FIU Panthers (0–0) – Game summary

| Quarter | 1 | 2 | 3 | 4 | Total |
|---|---|---|---|---|---|
| Bearkats | 0 | 0 | 0 | 0 | 0 |
| Panthers | 0 | 0 | 0 | 0 | 0 |

at Pitbull Stadium • Miami, Florida

- Date: November 28
- Game time: 1:00 p.m. CST / 2:00 p.m. EST
- TV: ESPN Networks

| Statistics | SHSU | FIU |
|---|---|---|
| First downs | | |
| Total yards | | |
| Rushing yards | | |
| Passing yards | | |
| Turnovers | | |
| Time of possession | | |

| Team | Category | Player | Statistics |
|---|---|---|---|
| Sam Houston | Passing | | |
| Sam Houston | Rushing | | |
| Sam Houston | Receiving | | |
| FIU | Passing | | |
| FIU | Rushing | | |
| FIU | Receiving | | |

== Personnel ==
=== Roster ===
2026 Sam Houston Bearkats football team roster
Players
Coaches
Offense

| Pos. | # | Name | Class |
|---|---|---|---|
| WR | 0 | Darrick Bledsoe III | Jr |
| WR | 1 | Aviyon Smith-Mack | Sr |
| WR | 2 | Chris Reed | Sr |
| WR | 3 | Tim Burns Jr. | Sr |
| WR | 4 | Alijah Cason | Jr |
| WR | 5 | Kyan Berry-Johnson | Jr |
| RB | 6 | Jerrian Parker Jr. | Jr |
| WR | 7 | Grady O'Neill | Sr |
| QB | 8 | Landyn Locke | So |
| QB | 9 | Brett Holloway | Fr |
| RB | 10 | Landan Brown | Jr |
| WR | 11 | Kaleb Mitchell | So |
| WR | 12 | Kamari Maxwell | So |
| WR | 13 | Ty Sexton | Fr |
| TE | 14 | London Deyon | So |
| QB | 15 | DJ Bailey | So |
| QB | 16 | Mason Holtzclaw | Fr |
| WR | 17 | Christian Zachary | Jr |
| QB | 18 | Shaan Patel | Fr |
| WR | 19 | Konner Dandridge | Fr |
| RB | 20 | MJ Dowdy | Fr |
| RB | 22 | Alton McCaskill | GS |
| RB | 24 | Kaden Winkfield | Fr |
| RB | 25 | Ah'Marion Gaines-Smith | Sr |
| RB | 43 | Nick Norman | Sr |
| OL | 50 | Tr'e Williams | Fr |
| OL | 52 | Cam Todd | Sr |
| OL | 54 | Brock Stukes | Sr |
| OL | 56 | Jeremiah Edmond | Jr |
| OL | 57 | Zo'Maryon Bryan | Sr |
| OL | 58 | Carter Kadow | Jr |
| OL | 62 | Carter Buchheit | So |
| OL | 63 | Joe Warren | Jr |
| OL | 64 | Josiah Chenault | Sr |
| OL | 66 | Jimmy Walls | Sr |
| OL | 67 | Isaac Sohn | Jr |
| OL | 68 | Logan Cahill | Fr |
| OL | 71 | Denell Nix Jr. | So |
| OL | 72 | Myles Joseph | Fr |
| OL | 74 | Graceson Spann | Fr |
| OL | 75 | Elijah Collins | Jr |
| OL | 76 | Nathan McClelland | Jr |
| TE | 80 | Matt Smith | GS |
| TE | 82 | Cooper Stevens | So |
| WR | 84 | Matthew Tatum | Jr |
| TE | 85 | Cade Hays | So |
| TE | 86 | Jack Merryman | Fr |
| TE | 87 | Max Whisner | 5th |
| WR | 88 | Terrance Guillory II | So |
| TE | 89 | Brock Kuhl | So |

Defense

| Pos. | # | Name | Class |
|---|---|---|---|
| DE | 1 | Josh Alexander-Felton | Jr |
| CB | 2 | Justin Cottrell | Sr |
| DE | 3 | Brody Henderson | So |
| S | 4 | Jalyn Stanford | Jr |
| CB | 5 | Ishmel Atkins | 5th |
| S | 6 | Jaylon Jones | Jr |
| CB | 7 | Caesar Magee | GS |
| S | 8 | Tyler Bailey | Sr |
| S | 9 | Jace Arnold | Jr |
| DT | 10 | Darien Jackson | Jr |
| S | 11 | CJ June | Fr |
| LB | 12 | Elijah Groves | Jr |
| S | 13 | Railyn Adams | So |
| DE | 14 | Bryen Spaulding | Sr |
| S | 15 | Cameron Franklin | 5th |
| S | 16 | Aaron Edwards | Jr |
| CB | 17 | Octavius Henderson | Sr |
| LB | 18 | Stacy Bey | So |
| DE | 19 | Jayden Fry | So |
| DB | 20 | Dravon Wilson | So |
| LB | 21 | Dean Ford | So |
| LB | 23 | Mike King Jr. | Jr |
| LB | 26 | Tokyo Gordon | Sr |
| S | 27 | Robert McFarland | Fr |
| DE | 28 | Zion Taylor | Jr |
| S | 29 | Lyric Smith | So |
| S | 30 | Braylen Wortham | Fr |
| LB | 32 | Kade Houston | Sr |
| LB | 33 | Brian Bates Jr. | Sr |
| CB | 34 | Julian Mayfield | Fr |
| CB | 35 | Jabaric Sullivan | Fr |
| S | 36 | Marcus Bourda Jr. | Fr |
| LB | 37 | Ryan Mallory | Fr |
| CB | 38 | O'Kece Battle | Fr |
| CB | 39 | Joseph Opara | Fr |
| LB | 40 | Cole Worthington | Jr |
| LB | 42 | Ca'lub Holloway | Sr |
| CB | 43 | Evan Odom | So |
| LB | 44 | Ray Chatham | Jr |
| LB | 45 | Eli Wallace | Jr |
| DE | 48 | Chauncey Chidi | Sr |
| DT | 90 | Uzziah Warmate | Fr |
| DE | 91 | Caius Coy | Fr |
| DT | 92 | Jarra Anderson | Sr |
| DT | 93 | Errol West Jr. | Fr |
| DT | 95 | She'Fon Boyd | Jr |
| DT | 97 | Dylan Frazier | Sr |
| DT | 98 | Justin Terrell | Jr |
| DT | 99 | Dimitry Nicolas | Jr |

Special teams

| Pos. | # | Name | Class |
|---|---|---|---|
| P | 31 | Cal Joseph | So |
| LS | 46 | Carson Whitington | Sr |
| LS | 47 | Victor Gamboa | Fr |
| LS | 49 | Cameron McCulloch | Jr |
| K | 81 | Nico Ottomanelli | So |
| K | 83 | Tate Ryan | Fr |
| K | 94 | Sam Carpenter | Sr |

Head coach

- Phil Longo

Coordinators/assistant coaches

- Eric Raisbeck – Associate head coach/special teams coordinator/slot receivers
- Freddie Aughtry-Lindsay – Defensive coordinator
- Zack Patterson – Offensive coordinator
- Damien Adams – Defensive tackles
- Jack Bicknell Jr. – Offensive line
- Dovonte Edwards – Safeties
- Gary McGraw – Cornerbacks
- Issac Mooring – Edges
- Antonio Williams – Running backs
- Keyan Williams – Wide receivers

Legend

- (C) Team captain
- (S) Suspended
- (I) Ineligible
- Injured
- Redshirt

Roster
Last update: October 4, 2026

==== Outgoing ====
| Player | Position | Destination |
|---|---|---|
| Jayveon Johnson | LB | Dodge City CC |
| Jake Fitzgerald | LS | Duke |
| Maurice Mathis II | CB | Henderson State |
| Rayfield Lotten | TE | New Mexico State |
| Mabrey Mettauer | QB | SMU |
| JaMair Diaz | LB | Temple |
| Mich'le Joseph | OL | Tennessee Tech |
| Fatu Mukuba | WR | Texas Southern |
| Dylan Burk | TE | UCF |
| Curtis Gerrand | P | UCLA |
| Kolt Dieterich | OT | Washington |
| Qua'Vez Humphreys | WR | Western Kentucky |
| Rhett Larson | IOL | Western Kentucky |
| Zeiqui Lawton | DL | Western Kentucky |
| Lonnie Adkism | WR | Unknown |
| Davion Green | DB | Unknown |
| Kevin Kalonji | OT | Unknown |
| Michael Phoenix II | WR | Unknown |
| Jaidan Scott | S | Unknown |
| Joe Swen | CB | Unknown |
| Hunter Watson | QB | Unknown |

==== Incoming ====
| Player | Position | Previous school |
|---|---|---|
| Max Whisner | TE | Akron |
| Denell Nix Jr. | OT | Appalachian State |
| Jarra Anderson | DL | Arizona |
| Stacy Bey | LB | Arizona |
| Kamari Maxwell | WR | Austin Peay |
| Jayden Fry | EDGE | Boston College |
| Nick Norman | RB | Briar Cliff |
| Nathan McClelland | OL | College of Idaho |
| Mike King Jr. | S | Concordia–St. Paul |
| Brian Bates | LB | Delaware State |
| Ishmel Atkins | CB | Elon |
| Brock Kuhl | TE | Florida Atlantic |
| Ray Chatham | LB | Hardin–Simmons |
| Alijah Cason | WR | Holy Cross |
| Zion Taylor | EDGE | Houston |
| Josiah Chenault | IOL | Kennesaw State |
| Dimitry Nicolas | DL | Maryland |
| Josh Alexander-Felton | DE | NC State |
| Elijah Groves | LB | NC State |
| Brock Stukes | IOL | NC State |
| Justin Terrell | DL | NC State |
| Christian Zachary | WR | NC State |
| Kade Houston | LB | Nelson |
| Aaron Edwards | S | Northeastern Oklahoma A&M |
| Caesar Magee III | CB | Northwestern State |
| Sam Carpenter | K | Pittsburgh |
| Cameron Franklin | S | Prairie View A&M |
| Matt Smith | TE | Rhode Island |
| Carter Kadow | OT | Rutgers |
| Cameron McCulloch | LS | SMU |
| Cade Hays | TE | Sul Ross State |
| Kaleb Mitchell | WR | Utah State |
| Cal Joseph | P | Wake Forest |
| William Davis | S | West Virginia |
| Elijah Collins | IOL | Western Carolina |
| Kyan Berry-Johnson | WR | Wisconsin |

=== Coaching staff additions ===
| Name | New position | Previous team | Previous position |
|---|---|---|---|
| Jack Bicknell Jr. | Offensive line | West Virginia | Offensive line coach |
| Antonio Williams | Running backs | First time coaching | |
