= T. Wingate Andrews High School =

Public school in North Carolina, US

T. Wingate Andrews Senior High School

Location
- 1920 McGuinn Drive; High Point, North Carolina 27265; United States; 35°59′06″N 79°59′23″W

Information
- Other name: T.W. Andrews; Andrews
- Type: Public
- Motto: "We show P.R.I.D.E. in everything we do." (Positive attitude, Respect, Integrity, Dependability, Effort)
- Established: 1968 (58 years ago)
- School district: Guilford County Schools
- CEEB code: 341852
- Principal: Darrell Baker
- Teaching staff: 48.07 (FTE)
- Grades: 9–12
- Enrollment: 725 (2023-2024)
- Student to teacher ratio: 15.08
- Colors: Red, White, and Blue
- Mascot: Red Raiders
- Nickname: Red Raider Nation
- Website: andrewshs.gcsnc.com

T. Wingate Andrews High School (known colloquially as T.W. Andrews or Andrews) is a public magnet high school in High Point, North Carolina, and part of the Western region of the Guilford County school district. Andrews has been designated to receive additional support, resources, and incentives as a federal Title I school.

T. Wingate Andrews High School was opened in 1968 with Samuel E. Burford as its first principal. This school was built specifically to follow the federal mandate to integrate the races in the United States, and Burford's selection was notable as he was African American. Students were drawn from the black high school, former William Penn High School (now Penn-Griffin School for the Arts) and from the white high school, High Point Central High School. It was named after Thomas Wingate Andrews (1882–1937), who served as superintendent of High Point schools.

The current principal is Darrell Baker, formerly the assistant principal of the school. Baker took the position beginning in the 2023–2024 school year.

== Rivalries and traditions ==
The school has long had a sports-based rivalry with High Point Central High School, which has led to several cases of vandalism between the two schools.

== Facilities ==
Construction on the original school campus finished in 1968. A three-story annex was completed in 2001, along with an auxiliary gym and a drama room.

The Andrews football teams play home games at the 10,000-seat A.J. Simeon Stadium, the largest stadium in High Point, which also hosts sporting events for High Point Central High School.

== Academics ==
Andrews offers Advanced Placement courses and specialized academic magnet programs, including the Aviation Academy and the Early College of Health Sciences.

The Aviation Academy at Andrews High School is an Early College program which provides free college classes for students interested in aviation or engineering careers. Students can earn an associate degree from Guilford Technical Community College (GTCC) while still in high school. Credits transfer to other colleges and universities. The program also provides paid internships at aviation businesses, job shadowing opportunities, and FAA licenses and industry certifications, such as Solid Works and AutoCAD.

The Andrews Early College of Health Science offers an opportunity for students to prepare for a future career in the field of health sciences. Students participate in internships. Students in the program complete a high school curriculum during their first three years, then take first-year college courses, earning dual high school and college credits. Students who complete this program earn an Early College diploma in addition to the GCS high school diploma.

From 2012 to 2016, Advancement Via Individual Determination (AVID) was another program at Andrews. AVID was an elective course, for which students had to apply and interview. It was designed to support students from low-income families would be a first-generation college student. The AVID program was discontinued in the 2016–2017 school year due to budgeting constraints.

== Athletics ==
Andrews is a member of the North Carolina High School Athletic Association (NCHSAA). Sports include soccer, basketball, football, baseball, track, cross country, softball, cheerleading, volleyball, and wrestling. Eleven T.W. Andrews alumni football players have gone on to play in the National Football League. Several students each year receive athletic scholarships for college, particularly for football, track and field, and women's basketball.

== Notable alumni ==
- Freddie Aughtry-Lindsay — college football coach
- Tony Baker — NFL running back
- Fantasia Barrino — R&B singer, songwriter, actress, author, and season three winner of American Idol
- Ted Brown — NFL running back and member of the College Football Hall of Fame
- Lawrence Chandler — composer, musician, producer and founding member of Bowery Electric
- Johnny Evans — NFL and CFL punter and quarterback
- Marcus Gilchrist — NFL safety
- William Hayes — NFL defensive end
- Greg Jeffries — NFL safety
- Junior Robinson — NFL defensive back
- Emily Spivey — television writer and producer. Former writer for Saturday Night Live
- Dan Wagoner — NFL defensive back
- Tony Washington — NFL wide receiver
- Adrian Wilson — NFL safety, 5x Pro Bowl selection, member of Arizona Cardinals Ring of Honor
