= Eric Raisbeck =

American football coach

Current position
- Title: Co-Interim HC / Special Teams Coordinator
- Team: Sam Houston
- Conference: Conference USA
- Record: 0–1

Biographical details
- Born: Middleton, Wisconsin

Playing career
- 2004–2007: Wisconsin–La Crosse
- Position: Tight end

Coaching career (HC unless noted)
- 2008: Wisconsin–La Crosse (GA)
- 2009: Belleville HS (WI) (AHC/OC)
- 2010: Madison West HS (WI) (WR)
- 2010–2011: Milwaukee Mustangs (ST)
- 2011: Chadron State (GA)
- 2012: Winona State (GA)
- 2012–2013: South Dakota Mines (RB)
- 2013: Calanda Broncos (DC)
- 2014: Oslo Vikings
- 2014: Presentation (Co-OC/RB/TE/FB)
- 2015: Presentation (ST/RB/TE)
- 2016: South Dakota Mines (ST/DL)
- 2017–2018: Wisconsin–Platteville (ST/DL)
- 2019: Utah State (Special teams administrative assistant)
- 2020–2023: Penn State (special teams analyst)
- 2024: UC Davis (ST)
- 2024: Wisconsin (assistant special teams coordinator)
- 2025–2026: Sam Houston (AHC/ST)
- 2026–present: Sam Houston (co-interim HC)

Head coaching record
- Overall: 0–1

Eric Raisbeck is an American football coach. He is currently the interim co-head coach of the Sam Houston Bearkats, a position he assumed in 2026. From 2025–2026 he was the associate head coach and special teams coordinator at Sam Houston. He has held various coaching positions in the United States and Europe since 2008.

== Early life ==
Raisbeck grew up in Middleton, Wisconsin, where he attended Middleton High School. He attended the University of Wisconsin–La Crosse in La Crosse, Wisconsin, where he played tight end. Raisbeck earned a degree in physical education from Wisconsin–La Crosse.

== Coaching career ==
Raisbeck began his coaching career in 2008 at Wisconsin–La Crosse as a graduate assistant on the staff of Larry Terry, his former head coach. In 2009 he was the assistant head coach and offensive coordinator at Belleville High School in Belleville, Wisconsin. In 2010 he moved over to Madison West High School in Madison, Wisconsin, where he coached wide receivers. After those two years coaching high school he joined the staff of the Milwaukee Mustangs of the Arena Football League as the special teams coordinator.

Raisbeck spent the 2011 season as a graduate assistant on the staff of Division II Chadron State in Chadron, Nebraska. He joined Winona State, another Division II school in Winona, Minnesota, for the spring of 2012, before joining NAIA South Dakota School of Mines and Technology as the running backs coach. Raisbeck spent the 2012 and 2013 seasons on the South Dakota staff under head coach Stacy Collins. While there, he also pursued two opportunities in Europe. In the summer of 2013, he served as the defensive coordinator of the Calanda Broncos of Nationalliga A in Chur, Switzerland. In the winter of 2014, he was the head coach of the Oslo Vikings of Superserien in Oslo, Norway.

Following the two years with South Dakota School of Mines and Technology and European interludes, Raisbeck moved over to NAIA Presentation College in Aberdeen, South Dakota. He coached there in various roles in 2014 and 2015 under head coach Andy Carr. Raisbeck returned to South Dakota School of Mines and Technology in 2016 as the special teams coordinator and defensive line coach. The move reunited him with head coach Zach Tinker, who had been offensive coordinator during Raisbeck's previous stint. Raisbeck left after the 2016 season to become the special teams coordinator and defensive line coach at Division III Wisconsin–Platteville in Platteville, Wisconsin, under long-time head coach Mike Emendorfer.

In 2019, Stacy Collins, now the special teams coordinator at Division I Utah State, hired Raisbeck as a special teams analyst. Penn State hired him for the same role in 2020, and he remained on James Franklin's staff through the 2023 season. In demand as a special teams coach, Raisbeck joined the UC Davis staff as special teams coordinator in 2024, only to be hired away by Luke Fickell at Wisconsin before the start of the season. After the 2024 season, Raisbeck departed to become associate head coach and special teams coordinator for at Sam Houston under new head coach Phil Longo. Longo had been offensive coordinator at Wisconsin before being fired toward the end of the 2024 season. Sam Houston fired Longo on October 28, 2026, and named Raisbeck and defensive coordinator Freddie Aughtry-Lindsay as interim co-head coaches.

== Head coaching record ==
=== College ===
Year	Team	Overall	Conference	Standing
Sam Houston Bearkats (Conference USA) (2026–present)
2026	Sam Houston	0–1 (Note: Interim co-head coach with Freddie Aughtry-Lindsay)	0–1	
Sam Houston:		0–1	0–1	
Total:		0–1		
