= Freddie Aughtry-Lindsay =

Current position
- Title: Co-Interim HC / Defensive Coordinator
- Team: Sam Houston
- Conference: Conference USA
- Record: 0–1

Biographical details
- Born: May 7, 1982 (age 44); High Point, North Carolina

Playing career
- 2001–2004: NC State
- Position: Linebacker

Coaching career (HC unless noted)
- 2007: Andrews HS (NC) (DC/LB)
- 2008: NC State (Recruiting assistant)
- 2009–2010: NC State (GA)
- 2011: Slippery Rock (LB)
- 2012–2013: Elon (LB)
- 2014: St. Augustine's (DC/ST)
- 2015: Campbell (LB)
- 2016–2017: Campbell (Defensive run game coordinator/LB)
- 2018: Ole Miss (analyst)
- 2019: North Carolina Central (DC/LB)
- 2020–2024: NC State (Nickels)
- 2025–2026: Sam Houston (DC)
- 2026–present: Sam Houston (co-interim HC/DC)

Head coaching record
- Overall: 0–1

Freddie Aughtry-Lindsay (born Freddie Aughtry, May 7, 1982), is an American football coach. He is currently the interim co-head coach of the Sam Houston Bearkats, a position he assumed in 2026. From 2025 to 2026 he was the defensive coordinator at Sam Houston. A graduate of North Carolina State University, his coaching career began in 2007.

== Early life ==
Freddie Aughtry was born on May 7, 1982, and grew up in High Point, North Carolina. He adopted the hyphenated surname Aughtry-Lindsay when his parents, Cynthia Aughtry Lindsay and Freddie Lindsay, married while he was in seventh grade. Aughtry-Lindsay was a standout linebacker and fullback at T. Wingate Andrews High School in High Point. He switched his commitment from Wake Forest to NC State when Wake fired head coach Jim Caldwell following the 2000 season. The assistant who recruited Aughtry-Lindsay to NC State was future national champion head coach Curt Cignetti.

Aughtry-Lindsay played linebacker at NC State from 2001 to 2004 under head coach Chuck Amato, starting in nineteen games. He completed his bachelor's degree in sociology in 2006. Prior to the start of his coaching career in 2007, he played for the Arkansas Twisters and Laredo Lobos of the AF2 arena football league.

== Coaching career ==
Aughtry-Lindsay began his coaching career in 2007 at T. Wingate Andrews High School, his former high school, as defensive coordinator. He then returned to NC State between 2008 and 2010, first as a recruiting assistant and then as a graduate assistant. The head coach at the time was Tom O'Brien, who succeeded Amato in 2007. Following the 2010 season Aughtry-Lindsay departed to coach linebackers at Slippery Rock in Slippery Rock, Pennsylvania, under long-time head coach George Mihalik. After one season he returned to the state of North Carolina as linebackers coach at Elon. The move reunited him with Elon head coach Jason Swepson, who had coached running backs at NC State.

Elon fired Swepson following the 2013 season. Aughtry-Lindsay became defensive coordinator and special teams coach at St. Augustine's in Raleigh, North Carolina. In 2015, he joined Mike Minter's staff at Campbell, again as linebackers coach. Campbell promoted Aughtry-Lindsay to defensive run game coordinator in 2016. Aughtry-Lindsay left Campbell after the 2017 season to become an analyst at Ole Miss, with the title "senior player personnel analyst," for the 2018 season. In 2019, he was defensive coordinator at North Carolina Central under first-year head coach Trei Oliver.

From 2020 to 2024 Aughtry-Lindsay again coached at NC State, this time under Dave Doeren, who had succeeded O'Brien in 2013. Aughtry-Lindsay coached the nickel position. Following the 2024 season NC State promoted him to co-defensive coordinator with D. J. Eliot. The promotion was short-lived; in February 2025 new head coach Phil Longo hired Aughtry-Lindsay to be defensive coordinator at Sam Houston. Longo had been wide receivers coach at Slippery Rock in 2011 and offensive coordinator at Ole Miss in 2018. Sam Houston fired Longo on October 28, 2026, and named Aughtry-Lindsay and special teams coordinator Eric Raisbeck as interim co-head coaches.

== Head coaching record ==
=== College ===
Year	Team	Overall	Conference	Standing
Sam Houston Bearkats (Conference USA) (2026–present)
2026	Sam Houston	0–1 (Note: Interim co-head coach with Eric Raisbeck)	0–1	
Sam Houston:		0–1	0–1	
Total:		0–1		
