= Colton Swan =

Colton Swan may refer to:

- Colton Swan (American football) (born 1980), American football coach and former linebacker
- Colton Swan (soccer) (born 2007), American soccer player
