= Mike Emendorfer =

American football coach (born c. 1964)

Current position
- Title: Athletic director
- Team: Rock Island HS (IL)

Biographical details
- Born: c. 1964 (age 61–62); Lockport, New York, U.S.
- Education: William Penn College (1986); United States Sports Academy (1995)

Playing career
- 1982–1985: William Penn
- Position: Wide receiver

Coaching career (HC unless noted)
- 1986: Medina HS (OH) (assistant)
- 1987–1988: Grinnell (assistant)
- 1989–1990: Quincy (OC)
- 1991–1998: Hanover (OC)
- 1999–2021: Wisconsin–Platteville

Administrative career (AD unless noted)
- 2016–2017: Wisconsin–Platteville (interim AD)
- 2019–2020: Wisconsin–Platteville (interim AD)
- 2022–present: Rock Island HS (IL)

Head coaching record
- Overall: 112–110
- Tournaments: 1–2 (NCAA D-III playoffs)

Michael Emendorfer (born c. 1964) is an American athletic director and former college football coach. He is the athletic director for Rock Island High School, a position he has held since 2022. He was the head football coach for the University of Wisconsin–Platteville from 1999 to 2021. He also coached for Medina High School, Grinnell, Quincy, and Hanover. He played college football for William Penn as a wide receiver.

== Head coaching record ==
Year	Team	Overall	Conference	Standing	Bowl/playoffs	D3^{#}
Wisconsin–Platteville Pioneers (Wisconsin Intercollegiate Athletic Conference) (1999–2021)
1999	Wisconsin–Platteville	5–5	3–4	T–4th		
2000	Wisconsin–Platteville	2–8	1–6	T–6th		
2001	Wisconsin–Platteville	4–6	3–4	T–5th		
2002	Wisconsin–Platteville	2–7	1–6	8th		
2003	Wisconsin–Platteville	3–7	1–6	T–7th		
2004	Wisconsin–Platteville	6–4	3–4	T–5th		
2005	Wisconsin–Platteville	1–9	0–7	8th		
2006	Wisconsin–Platteville	5–5	3–4	T–4th		
2007	Wisconsin–Platteville	2–8	1–6	8th		
2008	Wisconsin–Platteville	4–6	2–5	T–6th		
2009	Wisconsin–Platteville	3–7	1–6	T–7th		
2010	Wisconsin–Platteville	5–5	3–4	T–4th		
2011	Wisconsin–Platteville	7–3	5–2	T–2nd		
2012	Wisconsin–Platteville	8–2	5–2	T–2nd		13
2013	Wisconsin–Platteville	10–2	6–1	2nd	L NCAA Division III Second Round	9
2014	Wisconsin–Platteville	7–3	5–2	3rd		
2015	Wisconsin–Platteville	8–2	5–2	3rd		14
2016	Wisconsin–Platteville	8–3	5–2	3rd	L NCAA Division III First Round	14
2017	Wisconsin–Platteville	7–3	4–3	4th		
2018	Wisconsin–Platteville	4–6	2–5	T–6th		
2019	Wisconsin–Platteville	7–3	4–3	4th		
2020–21	No team—COVID-19					
2021	Wisconsin–Platteville	4–6	3–4	5th		
Wisconsin–Platteville:		112–110	65–89			
Total:		112–110				
