= Air raid offense =

American football offense emphasizing long passes

In American football, the air raid offense is an offensive scheme popularized by such coaches as Earnest Wilson, Hal Mumme, Mike Leach, Sonny Dykes, and Tony Franklin during their respective tenures at Iowa Wesleyan University, Valdosta State, Kentucky, Oklahoma, Texas Tech, Louisiana Tech, and Washington State.

The system is designed out of a shotgun formation with four wide receivers and one running back. The formations often feature two outside receivers and two inside slot receivers. The offense also uses trips formations featuring three wide receivers on one side of the field and a single receiver on the other side.

== History ==
The term "air raid offense" appeared in print at least as early as 1941 to describe the offense of the Indiana Hoosiers football team which was "long adept in filling the air with well-aimed passes" under coach Bo McMillin.

The modern air raid offense first made its appearance when Mumme and Leach took over at Iowa Wesleyan College and Valdosta State University and had success there during the late 1980s and early 1990s. The first exposure into NCAA Division I-A (now FBS) was at the University of Kentucky starting in 1997. There, head coach Hal Mumme and assistant coach Mike Leach helped turn quarterback Tim Couch into a consensus All-American in 1998 and later a first overall NFL draft pick. Leach then served as offensive coordinator at the University of Oklahoma in 1999 before landing the head coaching job at Texas Tech. Shortly into the early 2000s, assistant coaches started landing head coaching jobs such as Chris Hatcher at Valdosta State, Art Briles (first at Houston then Baylor), Sonny Dykes (first at Louisiana Tech, then at California), Ruffin McNeill at East Carolina, Dana Holgorsen at West Virginia, and Kevin Sumlin (first at Houston, then Texas A&M). Kliff Kingsbury (Mike Leach's first quarterback at Texas Tech) ran the offense as a coach, as well. As of 2016, seven of the top 10 college leaders in career passing percentages—all above 68.6%—were Air Raid quarterbacks.

== Air raid system ==
The scheme is notable for its focus on passing, as 65–75% of the offensive plays are passing plays. The quarterback has the freedom to change the play based on what the defensive team shows him at the line of scrimmage, using a vocal signal called an "audible". In at least one instance, as many as 90% of the run plays called in a season were chosen by an audible at the line of scrimmage.

An important element in this offense is that it does not huddle, known as the no-huddle offense. The offense gets to the line of scrimmage as soon as the previous play ends. The quarterback then diagnoses what the defense is showing, starts the next play quickly, and is responsible for making most of the audible play calls. The quick pace of the offense not only allows a team to come back if they are many points behind, but also tires out the defense and keeps them off balance by limiting player substitutions.

Another important aspect of the air raid offense is the positioning, or split, of the offensive linemen. In a conventional offense, the linemen are bunched together fairly tightly, but in an air raid offense, linemen are often split apart about a half to a full yard from one another. While in theory this allows easier blitz lanes, it forces the defensive ends and defensive tackles to run farther to reach the quarterback for a sack. The quick, short passes offset any blitz that may come. Another advantage is that by forcing the defensive line to widen, it opens up wider than normal passing lanes for the quarterback to throw through, decreasing the chances of having the pass knocked down or intercepted.

Fundamental air raid play concepts are designed to get the ball out of the quarterback's hand quickly, stretch the defense thinly across the field in all directions, and allow the quarterback to key on one defensive player, who is forced to make a decision on which receiver to cover in his assigned area. Air raid plays are commonly designed to beat zone coverages, but they also work well against man-to-man defenses, since an air raid offense often employs receivers with better than average speed that gives them an advantage in man-to-man coverage.

== Coaches ==
- Hal Mumme – head coach at Valdosta State 1992–1996, Kentucky 1997–2000, Southeastern Louisiana 2003–2004, New Mexico State 2005–2008, McMurry 2009–2012, and Belhaven 2014–2017; offensive coordinator at SMU in 2013.
  - Mike Leach – offensive coordinator under Mumme at Valdosta State 1992–1996 then Kentucky 1997–1998; offensive coordinator at Oklahoma 1999; head coach at Texas Tech 2000–2009; head coach at Washington State 2012–2019; head coach at Mississippi State 2020–2022.
    - Mark Mangino – offensive line coach at Oklahoma in 1999 under Leach; offensive coordinator at Oklahoma 2000–2001 after Leach's departure; head coach at Kansas 2002–2009.
    - Steve Spurrier Jr. – wide receivers coach at Oklahoma in 1999 under Leach and 2000–2001 under Mangino after Leach's departure; offensive assistant at Oklahoma under Riley in 2016; wide receivers coach at Washington State under Leach from 2018 to 2019; wide receivers coach and passing game coordinator at Mississippi State 2020–2022 now is the offensive coordinator and quarterbacks coach at Tulsa 2023–present.
    - Art Briles – running backs coach at Texas Tech under Leach from 2000 to 2002; head coach at Houston 2003–2007 and Baylor 2008–2016.
    - Ruffin McNeil – at Texas Tech under Leach as linebackers coach 2000–2006 and defensive coordinator 2007–2009; head coach at East Carolina 2010–2015.
    - Lincoln Riley – wide receivers coach at Texas Tech from 2007 to 2009; offensive coordinator at East Carolina from 2010 to 2014; offensive coordinator from 2015 to 2017 at Oklahoma; head coach at Oklahoma from 2017 to 2021. Head coach at University of Southern California 2022–Present.
    - Sonny Cumbie – Played quarterback under Leach at Texas Tech, co-offensive coordinator at Texas Tech 2013; co-offensive coordinator at TCU from 2014 to 2016; offensive coordinator and quarterbacks coach at TCU from 2017 to 2020; offensive coordinator, quarterbacks coach, and interim head coach at Texas Tech in 2021; head coach at Louisiana Tech from 2022–present.
    - Graham Harrell – Offensive coordinator at Purdue University 2022–present; West Virginia University 2022; the University of Southern California 2019–2021; North Texas from 2016 to 2019. Played under Leach at Texas Tech.
    - Seth Littrell – running backs coach at Texas Tech under Leach from 2005 to 2008; head coach at North Texas from 2016 to 2022.
    - Greg McMackin – defensive coordinator at Texas Tech 2000–2002 under Leach; head coach at Hawaii from 2008 to 2011.
    - Manny Matsakis – special teams coordinator at Texas Tech 2000–2002 under Leach; head coach at Texas State in 2003.
    - Clay McGuire – offensive line coach at the University of Southern California; played under Leach at Texas Tech.
    - Eric Morris – inside wide receivers coach at Washington State 2012 under Leach; played under Leach at Texas Tech; offensive coordinator at Texas Tech 2013–2017 under Kingsbury. Head coach at Incarnate Word 2018–2021; offensive coordinator at Washington State 2022; head coach at North Texas 2022–present.
    - Robert Anae – offensive line coach at Texas Tech 2000–2004 under Leach; offensive coordinator at BYU 2005–2010; OC at BYU 2013–2015; OC at Virginia 2016–2021; OC at Syracuse 2022, OC at NC State (December 2022 – Present).
    - Josh Heupel – played QB under Leach (1999) and Mangino (2000) at Oklahoma. Coached quarterbacks at Oklahoma from 2006 to 2009 before serving as Co-OC from 2010 to 2014 for Oklahoma. After that, OC at Utah State (2015) and Missouri (2016–2017) before becoming head coach at UCF (2018–2020) and Tennessee (2021–present).
    - Kliff Kingsbury – quarterback at Texas Tech 1998–2002, under Leach 2000–2002; offensive coordinator and quarterbacks coach at Houston under Sumlin 2010–2011; offensive coordinator at Texas A&M under Sumlin in 2012; head coach at Texas Tech 2013–2018. Offensive Coordinator at the University of Southern California 2018 (1 month); head coach of the Arizona Cardinals 2019–2022.
      - Mike Jinks – running backs coach at Texas Tech 2013–2015 under Kingsbury; head coach at Bowling Green 2016–2018.
  - Tony Franklin – running backs coach at Kentucky 1997–1999, under Leach in 1998; offensive coordinator at Kentucky in 2000; offensive coordinator at Troy in 2006, Auburn 2007–2008, Middle Tennessee 2009, Louisiana Tech 2010–2012, and OC at California 2013–2016.
  - Chris Hatcher – quarterbacks and receivers coach at Kentucky under Mumme in 1999; head coach at Valdosta State 2000–2006, Georgia Southern 2007–2009, Murray State 2010–2014, and Samford 2015 present.
  - Dana Holgorsen – quarterbacks and wide receivers coach under Mumme at Valdosta State 1993–1995; at Texas Tech under Leach as wide receivers coach 2000–2006 and offensive coordinator in 2007; offensive coordinator and quarterbacks coach at Houston under Kevin Sumlin 2008–2009; offensive coordinator at Oklahoma State in 2010; head coach at West Virginia from 2011 to 2018; current head coach at the University of Houston.
    - Jake Spavital – quarterbacks coach under Holgorsen West Virginia 2011–2013; QB coach/offensive coordinator under Sumlin at Texas A&M 2013–2015; and QB coach/offensive coordinator under Dykes 2016; QB coach/offensive coordinator under Holgorsen at West Virginia 2017–2018; and Texas State head coach 2018–2022. Returns for a second stint at California to be the OC and QB coach 2023–2024; Now is the offensive coordinator at Baylor University 2024–present

Sonny Dykes – wide receivers coach at Kentucky under Mumme in 1999 and Texas Tech under Leach 2000–2006; offensive coordinator and quarterbacks coach at Arizona 2007–2009; head coach at Louisiana Tech 2010–2012; head coach at California 2013–2016; head coach at SMU 2018–2021; and head coach at TCU 2022–present.

- Mike Gundy – Head coach at Oklahoma State (2005–2025)
  - Todd Monken – offensive coordinator under Gundy (2011–2012), head coach at Southern Miss (2013–2015), offensive coordinator and quarterbacks coach at Georgia (2020–2022), offensive coordinator for the Baltimore Ravens (2023–2026). Current head coach of the Cleveland Browns (2026-present).
- Matt Mumme – head coach at LaGrange College (2013–2016), offensive coordinator at Nevada 2017–2021
- Kevin Sumlin – wide receivers coach at Purdue 1998–2000, offensive coordinator at Texas A&M 2001–2002 and Oklahoma 2006–2007; head coach at Houston 2008–2011, Texas A&M 2012–2017, and Arizona 2018–2020.
- Phil Longo – head coach at Sam Houston State (Present), offensive coordinator at Wisconsin (2022–2024), North Carolina (2019–2022), Ole Miss (2017–2018), offensive coordinator & QB Coach at Sam Houston State (2014 -2016).
