= Dovonte Edwards =

American football player and coach (born 1982)

Sam Houston Bearkats
- Title: Safeties coach

Personal information
- Born: October 17, 1982 (age 44); Chapel Hill, North Carolina, U.S.
- Listed height: 5 ft 11 in (1.80 m)
- Listed weight: 181 lb (82 kg)

Career information
- High school: Chapel Hill
- College: NC State
- NFL draft: 2005: undrafted

Career history

Playing
- Minnesota Vikings (2005–2006); New York Giants (2007)*; Detroit Lions (2007); Toronto Argonauts (2009); Toronto Argonauts (2011)*; Omaha Nighthawks (2011–2012)
- * Offseason or practice squad member only

Coaching
- Kentucky Christian (2014) Special teams coordinator & defensive backs coach; Kentucky Christian (2015) Assistant head coach, defensive coordinator, & defensive backs coach; Furman (2016) Defensive analyst; Morehead State (2017) Co-special teams coordinator & defensive backs coach; Morehead State (2018) Defensive coordinator & defensive backs coach; North Carolina Central (2019–2020) Defensive pass game coordinator & defensive backs coach; Elon (2021) Defensive pass game coordinator & safeties coach; Elon (2022–2024) Defensive coordinator & defensive backs coach; Sam Houston (2025–present) Safeties coach

Career NFL statistics
- Total tackles: 37
- Pass deflections: 5
- Interceptions: 1
- Defensive touchdowns: 1
- Stats at Pro Football Reference
- Stats at CFL.ca (archive)

Dovonte Edwards (born October 17, 1982) is an American former professional football player who was a cornerback in the National Football League (NFL) and Canadian Football League (CFL). He was signed by the Minnesota Vikings as an undrafted free agent in 2005. He played college football for the NC State Wolfpack.

Edwards was also a member of the New York Giants, Detroit Lions and Toronto Argonauts. He later played for the Omaha Nighthawks of the United Football League (UFL).

He was the defensive coordinator at Elon through the 2024 season and had previously been the defensive coordinator at Morehead State.

== Early life ==
As a senior at Chapel Hill High School in Chapel Hill, North Carolina, Edwards had 14 receiving, 2 punt returns and 1 kickoff returns for touchdowns in football. He was also a 3-time all-conference selection in basketball.

== College career ==
Edwards was a four-year player at NC State, where he played Cornerback, wide receiver and returned punts. He was named Most Outstanding Defensive Player after the 2004 season. He started all 11 games at cornerback as a senior and led the team with 3 interceptions. He also played basketball as a freshman and sophomore.

== Professional career ==
Pre-draft measurables
Height	Weight
5 ft 10 5/8 in (1.79 m)	177 lb (80 kg)
Values from Pro Day

=== 2005 ===
Edwards first national exposure came on Monday Night Football when he intercepted a Brett Favre pass and returned it 51 yards for a touchdown. Edwards was a possible reason the Vikings were able to release Ken Irvin and sign a third quarterback, J. T. O'Sullivan, when Daunte Culpepper was lost for the season.

=== 2006 ===
Edwards' second NFL season ended prematurely after suffering a season-ending arm injury against Dallas in the preseason while battling with rookie Cedric Griffin for the nickelback spot.

=== 2007 ===
Edwards looked to make a comeback in 2007 and battle for the nickel and dime spot on the team along with Charles Gordon and Ronyell Whittaker. However, he appeared to be the odd man out, as he was cut during the finals roster cuts and claimed by Giants on the same day. However, he was released by Giants just six days later. Edwards was signed by the Lions to the active roster on October 17. Was inactive vs. the Tampa Bay Buccaneers, at the Chicago Bears and vs. the Denver Broncos. Made two special teams tackles at Arizona in his first action since signing with the Lions. Was inactive vs. the New York Giants, against the Packers and at Minnesota. Edwards recorded a career-high in tackles with 10 against the Dallas Cowboys. Had three tackles and a pass defensed at the San Diego Chargers. Made one tackle and two passes defensed against the Kansas City Chiefs, also had two special teams tackles. Had three tackles (two solo) to finish the season at Green Bay.

=== 2008 ===
Edwards was released by the Detroit Lions during the 2008 preseason and spent the rest of the year out of football.

=== 2009 ===
Edwards was signed by the Toronto Argonauts on May 12, 2009. During the 2009 CFL season, Edwards served as the Argonauts' primary kick returner.

=== 2010 ===
Due to a leg injury, Edwards was unable to play football for the upcoming season. He was released by the Argonauts on June 1, 2010.

=== 2011 ===
On May 27, 2011, Edwards re-signed with the Toronto Argonauts. He was released by the Argonauts on June 24, 2011.

== Professional career stats ==
Professional Career Defensive Statistics
Year	Team	G	Tkl	Ast	Sacks	Int	Yds	Avg	Lg	TD	Pass Def
2005	Minnesota	12	6	0	0	1	51	51.0	51	1	3
2006	Minnesota	0	--	--	--	--	--	--	--	--	--
2007	NYG/Detroit	5	17	4	0	0	0.0	0	0	0	3
Total		17	23	4	0	1	51	51.0	51	1	6
