= Phil Longo =

American football player and coach (born 1968)

Biographical details
- Born: April 17, 1968 (age 58); Red Bank, New Jersey, U.S.

Playing career
- 1987: East Stroudsburg
- 1988–1991: Rowan
- Positions: Quarterback, running back

Coaching career (HC unless noted)
- 1996–1999: Parsippany Hills HS (NJ)
- 2000–2001: William Paterson (AHC/OC)
- 2002–2003: La Salle (AHC/OC)
- 2004–2005: La Salle
- 2006–2007: Minnesota Duluth (OC)
- 2008–2009: Southern Illinois (OC)
- 2010: Youngstown State (WR/RC)
- 2011: Slippery Rock (WR)
- 2012–2013: Slippery Rock (OC/QB)
- 2014–2016: Sam Houston State (OC/QB)
- 2017–2018: Ole Miss (OC/QB)
- 2019–2022: North Carolina (OC/QB)
- 2023–2024: Wisconsin (OC/QB)
- 2025–2026: Sam Houston State

Head coaching record
- Overall: 10–31 (college)

Phil Longo (born April 17, 1968) is a former American football coach. He was most recently the head football coach of Sam Houston from 2025–2026. He previously served as the offensive coordinator at Wisconsin. A practitioner of the air raid offense, he was also the offensive coordinator and quarterbacks coach for North Carolina, Ole Miss, and Sam Houston.

== Early life and playing career ==
Born in Red Bank, New Jersey, and raised in the Bayville section of Berkeley Township, New Jersey, Longo played quarterback at Central Regional High School.

His started his college career at East Stroudsburg University, where he played quarterback in 1987. The following year, he transferred to Rowan University.

== Coaching career ==
Longo began his coaching career at Parsippany Hills High School in New Jersey, taking over a team that accumulated a .217 winning percentage over the previous 33 years. At the time of his departure, Longo left as the winningest coach in school history while leading them to their first appearance in the New Jersey state playoffs and an undefeated championship season. He accepted an assistant coaching position at William Paterson as the assistant head coach and offensive coordinator in 2000. He left in 2002 to be the associate head coach and offensive coordinator at La Salle and was named the head coach of the team in 2004. As head coach of La Salle, he compiled a 7–14 record over two years before leaving to accept the offensive coordinator position at Minnesota–Duluth. He joined the coaching staff at Southern Illinois in 2008 as the offensive coordinator. Longo joined the coaching staff at Youngstown State in 2010 as the wide receivers coach and recruiting coordinator. Longo joined the coaching staff at Slippery Rock in 2011 as the wide receivers coach, where his wife Tanya worked as the head coach of the university's women's basketball team. He was promoted to offensive coordinator in 2012, and the team underwent a dramatic change in offense averaging 54.5 points a game.

=== Sam Houston State ===
Longo was added to the coaching staff at Sam Houston State in 2014. In his final year as an assistant at Sam Houston State, Longo's offense was one of the most prolific offenses in FCS, averaging 547 yards a game as the Bearkats went on to a 12–1 record.

=== Ole Miss ===
On December 15, 2016, it was reported that Longo was hired to be the new offensive coordinator and quarterbacks coach at the University of Mississippi. Despite averaging over 500 yards of offense per game, his offense was criticized for its inability to score in the red zone and in clutch moments.

=== North Carolina ===
Longo was named the offensive coordinator at North Carolina in 2019. In his first three seasons as Tar Heel OC, Longo's quarterback Sam Howell broke multiple school records, and his offense produced multiple 1,000 yard receivers and rushers.

=== Wisconsin ===
On December 7, 2022, it was reported that Longo would be joining Luke Fickell's staff at Wisconsin as the offensive coordinator and QBs coach. In 2023, Longo’s offense produced the Wisconsin Badgers lowest scoring average in nearly two decades at 23.5 points per game. At the time of his departure from Wisconsin, the Badgers offense ranked 97th nationally in scoring and 102nd in passing among the 138 Division 1 FBS programs. In addition, Longo's 2024 offense ranked 122nd nationally in plays of 20+ yards. Longo was fired on November 17, 2024, after the school started the 2024 season 5–5 (3–4 Big Ten). The Wisconsin State Journal's sports columnist said the team "whiffed" when it hired Longo. In 2026, Luke Fickell said he regretting firing Longo during the season rather than waiting until the end of the year.

=== Sam Houston State ===
Longo was named head coach at Sam Houston State in December 2024. In Longo's first season in 2025, the Bearkats finished with a 2-10 record whereas they had been 10-3 in 2024 before Longo arrived. Longo explained the team's struggles by saying: "The plan that you draw to run a program was not adhered to last year because of the roaring rapids river we were on." Players on his team complained to the media that Longo did not make good on his promises, rarely showed up on time to practice, and often skipped out on meetings.

As of October 20, 2026, Sam Houston State's passing offense under Longo ranked last in Conference USA. Long's offense scored just three points in three of their four Conference USA games in 2026. On October 26, 2026, USA Today included Longo on a list of coaches who could be fired, citing his 3-17 record as head coach with no wins against NCAA Division I Football Bowl Subdivision teams and the rise of nearby Tarleton State. Sam Houston fired Longo on October 28.

== Coaching philosophy ==
A practitioner of the air raid offense, Longo chose to adopt the offensive system after meeting then-Kentucky offensive coordinator Mike Leach at a coaching clinic in the late 1990s. Unlike the standard air raid offense that is pass-heavy, Longo's offense is designed so that it can be both pass or run oriented. Longo said that his favorite position to utilize in his offensive system is the slot receiver, saying: "I think the thing I love the most after my wife and kids are slot receivers."

== Personal life ==
Longo and his wife Tanya (Bauer) have four children: Gianna, Macaria, Morgan, and Nico. Tanya served as the head women's basketball coach at the University of Minnesota Duluth during the 2007–2008 season.

== Head coaching record ==
=== College ===
Year	Team	Overall	Conference	Standing
La Salle Explorers (Metro Atlantic Athletic Conference) (2004–2005)
2004	La Salle	3–7	1–3	T–3rd
2005	La Salle	4–7	2–2	T–3rd
La Salle:		7–14	3–5	
Sam Houston Bearkats (Conference USA) (2025–2026)
2025	Sam Houston	2–10	1–7	T–11th
2026	Sam Houston	1–7 (Note: Fired with four games remaining)	0–4	
Sam Houston:		3–17	1–11	
Total:		10–31		
