= 2024 Arkansas Razorbacks football team =

American college football season

2024 Arkansas Razorbacks football

Liberty Bowl champion

Liberty Bowl, W 39–26 vs. Texas Tech
- Conference: Southeastern Conference
- Record: 7–6 (3–5 SEC)
- Head coach: Sam Pittman (5th season)
- Offensive coordinator: Bobby Petrino (1st season)
- Offensive scheme: Veer and shoot
- Defensive coordinator: Travis Williams (2nd season)
- Co-defensive coordinator: Marcus Woodson (2nd season)
- Base defense: 4–2–5 or 3–2–6
- Captains: Cam Ball; Taylen Green; Landon Jackson
- Home stadium: Donald W. Reynolds Razorback Stadium; War Memorial Stadium

2024 Southeastern Conference football standings
	Conf.			Overall
Team	W		L	W		L
No. 4 Texas y^	7	–	1	13	–	3
No. 6 Georgia y$^	6	–	2	11	–	3
No. 9 Tennessee ^	6	–	2	10	–	3
No. 22 Missouri	5	–	3	10	–	3
No. 11 Ole Miss	5	–	3	10	–	3
No. 17 Alabama	5	–	3	9	–	4
No. 19 South Carolina	5	–	3	9	–	4
LSU	5	–	3	9	–	4
Texas A&M	5	–	3	8	–	5
Florida	4	–	4	8	–	5
Arkansas	3	–	5	7	–	6
Vanderbilt	3	–	5	7	–	6
Oklahoma	2	–	6	6	–	7
Auburn	2	–	6	5	–	7
Kentucky	1	–	7	4	–	8
Mississippi State	0	–	8	2	–	10
Championship: Georgia 22, Texas 19 ^{OT}
^ – College Football Playoff participant; $ – Conference champion; y – Championship game participant; Rankings from AP Poll

The 2024 Arkansas Razorbacks football team represented the University of Arkansas as a member of the Southeastern Conference (SEC) during the 2024 NCAA Division I FBS football season. Led by fifth-year head coach Sam Pittman, the Razorbacks compiled an overall record of 7–6 with a mark of 3–5 in conference play, tying for 11th place in the SEC. Arkansas was invited to the Liberty Bowl, where the Razorbacks defeated Texas Tech. The team played six home games at Donald W. Reynolds Razorback Stadium in Fayetteville, Arkansas and one home game at War Memorial Stadium in Little Rock, Arkansas.

== Schedule ==
Date	Time	Opponent	Site	TV	Result	Attendance
August 29	6:30 p.m.	Arkansas–Pine Bluff*	War Memorial Stadium; Little Rock, AR	ESPNU	W 70–0	40,127
September 7	11:00 a.m.	at No. 16 Oklahoma State*	Boone Pickens Stadium; Stillwater, OK	ABC	L 31–39 ^{2OT}	52,202
September 14	3:15 p.m.	UAB*	Donald W. Reynolds Razorback Stadium; Fayetteville, AR	SECN	W 37–27	75,021
September 21	2:30 p.m.	at Auburn	Jordan-Hare Stadium; Auburn, AL	ESPN	W 24–14	88,043
September 28	2:30 p.m.	vs. No. 24 Texas A&M	AT&T Stadium; Arlington, TX (rivalry)	ESPN	L 17–21	60,928
October 5	6:30 p.m.	No. 4 Tennessee	Donald W. Reynolds Razorback Stadium; Fayetteville, AR	ABC	W 19–14	75,573
October 19	6:00 p.m.	No. 8 LSU	Donald W. Reynolds Razorback Stadium; Fayetteville, AR (rivalry)	ESPN	L 10–34	75,893
October 26	11:45 a.m.	at Mississippi State	Davis Wade Stadium; Starkville, MS	SECN	W 58–25	49,303
November 2	11:00 a.m.	No. 19 Ole Miss	Donald W. Reynolds Razorback Stadium; Fayetteville, AR (rivalry)	ESPN	L 31–63	72,894
November 16	11:00 a.m.	No. 3 Texas	Donald W. Reynolds Razorback Stadium; Fayetteville, AR (rivalry)	ABC	L 10–20	74,929
November 23	3:00 p.m.	Louisiana Tech*	Donald W. Reynolds Razorback Stadium; Fayetteville, AR	SECN+, ESPN+	W 35–14	66,021
November 30	2:30 p.m.	at No. 21 Missouri	Faurot Field; Columbia, MO (Battle Line Rivalry)	SECN	L 21–28	62,621
December 27	6:00 p.m.	vs. Texas Tech*	Simmons Bank Liberty Stadium; Memphis, TN (Liberty Bowl, rivalry)	ESPN	W 39–26	37,764
*Non-conference game; Rankings from AP Poll (and CFP Rankings, after October 31) - Released prior to game; All times are in Central time

== Game summaries ==
=== vs. Arkansas–Pine Bluff ===
Uniform Combination
Helmet	Jersey	Pants

Game One – Arkansas–Pine Bluff Golden Lions (0–0) at Arkansas Razorbacks (0–0)

Quarter	1	2	3	4	Total
Golden Lions	0	0	0	0	0
Razorbacks	28	21	7	14	70

at War Memorial Stadium, Little Rock, Arkansas

- Date: Thursday, August 29, 2024
- Game time: 6:30 p.m. CST
- Game weather: Cloudy, 95 °F (35 °C)
- Game attendance: 40,127
- Referee: Lee Hedrick
- TV announcers (ESPNU): Jay Alter (play-by-play) and Rocky Boiman (analyst)
- Note: The third and fourth quarters were shortened to ten minutes each.

Game information

First quarter

- (12:08) Arkansas – Ja'Quinden Jackson 8-yard rush, Kyle Ramsey kick (Drive: 8 plays, 66 yards, 2:46; Arkansas 7–0)
- (8:16) Arkansas – Taylen Green 4-yard rush, Kyle Ramsey kick (Drive: 5 plays, 40 yards, 2:21; Arkansas 14–0)
- (5:03) Arkansas – Ja'Quinden Jackson 46-yard rush, Kyle Ramsey kick (Drive: 3 plays, 60 yards, 1:11; Arkansas 21–0)
- (1:12) Arkansas – Rodney Hill 4-yard rush, Kyle Ramsey kick (Drive: 7 plays, 40 yards, 2:05; Arkansas 28–0)

Second quarter

- (12:06) Arkansas – Tyrone Broden 9-yard pass from Taylen Green, Kyle Ramsey kick (Drive: 6 plays, 65 yards, 2:54; Arkansas 35–0)
- (5:37) Arkansas – Ty Washington 23-yard pass from Taylen Green, Kyle Ramsey kick (Drive: 6 plays, 81 yards, 3:09; Arkansas 42–0)
- (0:09) Arkansas – Taylen Green 36-yard rush, Kyle Ramsey kick (Drive: 7 plays, 77 yards, 1:33; Arkansas 49–0)

Third quarter

- (6:13) Arkansas – Braylen Russell 9-yard rush, Kyle Ramsey kick (Drive: 6 plays, 67 yards, 2:18; Arkansas 56–0)

Fourth quarter

- (8:14) Arkansas – Malachi Singleton 4-yard rush, Kyle Ramsey kick (Drive: 12 plays, 86 yards, 10:17; Arkansas 63–0)
- (0:36) Arkansas – Tyrell Reed Jr. 4-yard rush, Kyle Ramsey kick (Drive: 10 plays, 90 yards, 3:35; Arkansas 70–0)

Statistics	UAPB	ARK
First downs	10	34
Total yards	130	687
Rushing yards	7	279
Passing yards	123	408
Passing: Comp–Att–Int	11–23–0	28–37–0
Time of possession	27:45	32:15

Team	Category	Player	Statistics
Arkansas-Pine Bluff	Passing	Mekhi Hagens	11–23, 123 yards
Arkansas-Pine Bluff	Rushing	Oshawn Ross	5 carries, 13 yards
Arkansas-Pine Bluff	Receiving	Aramoni Rhone	2 receptions, 34 yards
Arkansas	Passing	Taylen Green	16–23, 229 yards, 2 TD
Arkansas	Rushing	Ja'Quinden Jackson	8 carries, 101 yards, 2 TD
Arkansas	Receiving	Isaac TeSlaa	3 receptions, 53 yards

=== at No. 16 Oklahoma State ===
Game Two – Arkansas Razorbacks (1–0) at No. 16 Oklahoma State Cowboys (1–0) – Game summary

Quarter	1	2	3	4	OT	2OT	Total
Razorbacks	14	7	0	10	0	0	31
No. 16 Cowboys	0	7	6	18	0	8	39

at Boone Pickens Stadium • Stillwater, Oklahoma

- Date: Saturday, September 7, 2024
- Game time: 11:00 a.m. CST
- Game weather: Sunny • Temperature: 69 °F (21 °C) • Wind: NE at 10 miles per hour (16 km/h)
- Game attendance: 52,202
- Referee: Matt Loeffler
- TV announcers (ABC): Dave Pasch (play-by-play), Dusty Dvoracek (analyst), and Taylor McGregor (sideline)

Game information

First quarter

- (5:52) Arkansas – Ja'Quinden Jackson 5-yard run, Kyle Ramsey kick (Drive: 6 plays, 45 yards, 2:45; Arkansas 7–0)
- (1:31) Arkansas – Ja'Quinden Jackson 5-yard run, Kyle Ramsey kick (Drive: 8 plays, 83 yards, 3:12; Arkansas 14–0)

Second quarter

- (8:50) Oklahoma State – Kale Smith 73-yard interception, Logan Ward kick (Arkansas 14–7)
- (5:05) Arkansas – Ja'Quinden Jackson 11-yard run, Kyle Ramsey kick (Drive: 7 plays, 75 yards, 3:45; Arkansas 21–7)

Third quarter

- (6:45) Oklahoma State – Logan Ward 45-yard field goal (Drive: 15 plays, 62 yards, 5:05; Arkansas 21–10)
- (0:39) Oklahoma State – Logan Ward 35-yard field goal (Drive: 8 plays, 31 yards, 2:46; Arkansas 21–13)

Fourth quarter

- (9:37) Oklahoma State – Brennan Presley 7-yard pass from Alan Bowman, De'Zhaun Stribling pass (Drive: 2 plays, 25 yards, 0:46; Tied 21–21)
- (5:13) Oklahoma State – Brennan Presley 3-yard run, Logan Ward kick (Drive: 5 plays, 80 yards, 1:32; Oklahoma State 28–21)
- (4:01) Arkansas – Luke Hasz 43-yard pass from Taylen Green, Kyle Ramsey kick (Drive: 3 plays, 75 yards, 1:12; Tied 28–28)
- (0:55) Oklahoma State – Logan Ward 38-yard field goal (Drive: 9 plays, 55 yards, 3:06; Oklahoma State 31–28)
- (0:00) Arkansas – Kyle Ramsey 45-yard field goal (Drive: 8 plays, 48 yards, 0:55; Tied 31–31)

Overtime

- (0:00) Oklahoma State – Ollie Gordon II 12-yard run, Ollie Gordon II pass (Drive: 3 plays, 25 yards, 0:00; Oklahoma State 39–31)

Statistics	ARK	OKST
First downs	33	21
Total yards	648	385
Rushing yards	232	59
Passing yards	416	326
Passing: Comp–Att–Int	26–46–1	27–48–1
Time of possession	36:14	23:46

Team	Category	Player	Statistics
Arkansas	Passing	Taylen Green	26/45, 416 yards, TD, INT
Arkansas	Rushing	Ja'Quinden Jackson	24 carries, 149 yards, 3 TD
Arkansas	Receiving	Andrew Armstrong	10 receptions, 164 yards
Oklahoma State	Passing	Alan Bowman	27/48, 326 yards, TD, INT
Oklahoma State	Rushing	Ollie Gordon II	17 carries, 49 yards, TD
Oklahoma State	Receiving	Brennan Presley	9 receptions, 91 yards, TD

=== vs UAB ===
Game Three – UAB Blazers (1–1) vs Arkansas Razorbacks (1–1) – Game summary

Quarter	1	2	3	4	Total
Blazers	10	10	0	7	27
Razorbacks	3	17	7	10	37

at Donald W. Reynolds Razorback Stadium • Fayetteville, Arkansas

- Date: September 14
- Game time: 3:15 p.m.
- Game weather: Cloudy • Temperature: 84 °F (29 °C) • Wind: E at 10 miles per hour (16 km/h)
- Game attendance: 75,021
- Referee: Jeff Heaser
- TV announcers (SECN): Dave Neal (play-by-play), Aaron Murray (analyst) and Ashley ShahAhmadi (sideline reporter)

Game information

First quarter

- (7:33) UAB – Jonah Delange 27 yard field goal (Drive: 15 plays, 66 yards, 7:27; UAB 3–0)
- (6:05) UAB – Kam Shanks 15 yard pass from Jacob Zeno, Jonah Delange kick (Drive: 2 plays, 15 yards, 0:35; UAB 10–0)
- (4:00) ARK – Kyle Ramsey 28 yard field goal (Drive: 7 plays, 13 yards, 2:01; UAB 10–3)

Second quarter

- (14:51) UAB – Amare Thomas 34 yard pass from Jacob Zeno, Jonah Delange kick (Drive: 8 plays, 75 yards, 4:09; UAB 17–3)
- (9:17) ARK – Braylen Russell 2 yard run, Kyle Ramsey kick (Drive: 12 plays, 75 yards, 5:34; UAB 17–10)
- (4:48) ARK – Taylen Green 14 yard run, Kyle Ramsey kick (Drive: 6 plays, 69 yards, 2:25; Tied 17–17)
- (1:53) UAB – Jonah Delange 23 yard field goal (Drive: 8 plays, 70 yards, 2:55; UAB 20–17)
- (1:03) ARK – Kyle Ramsey 51 yard field goal (Drive: 6 plays, 42 yards, 0:50; Tied 20–20)

Third quarter

- (10:00) ARK – Ja'Quinden Jackson 16 yard run, Kyle Ramsey kick (Drive: 11 plays, 84 yards, 4:56; Arkansas 27–20)

Fourth quarter

- (13:31) ARK – Kyle Ramsey 40 yard field goal (Drive: 7 plays, 66 yards, 3:02; Arkansas 30–20)
- (6:55) UAB – Dallas Payne 21 yard pass from Jacob Zeno, Jonah Delange kick (Drive: 12 plays, 83 yards, 6:33; Arkansas 30–27)
- (3:36) ARK – Taylen Green 9 yard run, Kyle Ramsey kick (Drive: 7 plays, 75 yards, 3:19; Arkansas 37–27)

Statistics	UAB	ARK
First downs	22	29
Total yards	67–354	64–427
Rushing yards	35–119	38–266
Passing yards	235	161
Passing: Comp–Att–Int	23–32–1	11–26–1
Time of possession	32:39	27:21

Team	Category	Player	Statistics
UAB	Passing	Jacob Zeno	23/32, 235 yards, 3 TD, INT
UAB	Rushing	Isaiah Jacobs	15 carries, 62 yards
UAB	Receiving	Amare Thomas	5 receptions, 56 yards, TD
Arkansas	Passing	Taylen Green	11/26, 161 yards, INT
Arkansas	Rushing	Ja'Quinden Jackson	15 carries, 147 yards, TD
Arkansas	Receiving	Andrew Armstrong	8 receptions, 137 yards

=== at Auburn ===
Arkansas Razorbacks (2–1) at Auburn Tigers (2–1) – Game summary

Quarter	1	2	3	4	Total
Razorbacks	0	7	7	10	24
Tigers	0	0	7	7	14

at Jordan-Hare Stadium • Auburn, Alabama

- Date: September 21
- Game time: 2:30 p.m.
- Game weather: Sunny • Temperature: 89 °F (32 °C) • Wind: E 2 mph
- Game attendance: 88,043
- Referee: Ken Williamson
- TV announcers (ESPN): Mark Jones (play-by-play), Roddy Jones (analyst), Quint Kessenich (sideline reporter)

Game information
First quarter
- No scoring plays.

Second quarter

- ARK – Ja'Quinden Jackson 1-yard rush (Kyle Ramsey kick), 14:49. Arkansas 7–0. Drive: 15 plays, 81 yards, 7:05.

Third quarter

- AUB – KeAndre Lambert-Smith 10-yard pass from Payton Thorne (Towns McGough kick), 5:44. Tied 7–7. Drive: 6 plays, 77 yards, 2:48.
- ARK – Isaiah Sategna 58-yard pass from Taylen Green (Kyle Ramsey kick), 2:03. Arkansas 14–7. Drive: 9 plays, 75 yards, 3:41.

Fourth quarter

- ARK – Kyle Ramsey 39-yard field goal, 12:04. Arkansas 17–7. Drive: 8 plays, 20 yards, 3:01.
- AUB – KeAndre Lambert-Smith 67-yard pass from Payton Thorne (Towns McGough kick), 9:50. Arkansas 17–14. Drive: 4 plays, 75 yards, 2:07.
- ARK – Ja'Quinden Jackson 1-yard rush (Kyle Ramsey kick), 3:38. Arkansas 24–14. Drive: 12 plays, 75 yards, 6:12.

Statistics	ARK	AUB
First downs	21	17
Total yards	83-334	61-431
Rushing yards	183	146
Passing yards	151	285
Passing: Comp–Att–Int	12-28-2	20-35-4
Time of possession	36:36	23:24

Team	Category	Player	Statistics
Arkansas	Passing	Taylen Green	12/27, 151 yards, TD, 2 INT
Arkansas	Rushing	Taylen Green	18 carries, 80 yards
Arkansas	Receiving	Isaiah Sategna	3 receptions, 85 yards, TD
Auburn	Passing	Payton Thorne	13/22, 213 yards, 2 TD, INT
Auburn	Rushing	Jarquez Hunter	12 carries, 67 yards
Auburn	Receiving	KeAndre Lambert-Smith	5 receptions, 156 yards, 2 TD

=== at No. 24 Texas A&M ===
Arkansas Razorbacks (3-1) vs. No. 24 Texas A&M Aggies (3-1) – Game summary

Quarter	1	2	3	4	Total
Razorbacks	14	0	0	3	17
No. 24 Aggies	7	7	0	7	21

at AT&T Stadium • Arlington, Texas

- Date: September 28
- Game time: 2:30 p.m.
- Game weather: None (retractable roof closed)
- Game attendance: 60,928
- Referee: Lee Hedrick
- TV announcers (ESPN): Dave Pasch (play-by-play), Dusty Dvoracek (analyst), and Taylor McGregor (sideline)

Game information

First quarter

- ARK – Isaac TeSlaa 75-yard pass from Taylen Green (Kyle Ramsey kick), 13:49. Razorbacks 7–0. Drive: 3 plays, 75 yards, 1:11.
- TAMU – Noah Thomas 58-yard pass from Marcel Reed (Randy Bond kick), 10:28. Tied 7–7. Drive: 3 plays, 70 yards, 1:07.
- ARK – Ja'Quinden Jackson 8-yard run (Kyle Ramsey kick), 4:50. Razorbacks 14–7. Drive: 10 plays, 75 yards, 5:38.

Second quarter

- TAMU – Marcel Reed 5-yard run (Randy Bond kick), 8:58. Tied 14–14. Drive: 2 plays, 10 yards, 0:41.

Third quarter

No scoring plays

Fourth quarter

- ARK – Kyle Ramsey 45-yard field goal, 13:24. Razorbacks 17–14. Drive: 10 plays, 58 yards, 4:12.
- TAMU – Tre Watson 5-yard pass from Marcel Reed (Randy Bond kick), 9:00. Aggies 21–17. Drive: 8 plays, 75 yards, 4:24.

Statistics	ARK	TAMU
First downs	22	17
Total yards	71–379	60–297
Rushing yards	30–100	38–134
Passing yards	279	163
Passing: Comp–Att–Int	23–41–1	11–22–0
Time of possession	30:39	29:21

Team	Category	Player	Statistics
Arkansas	Passing	Taylen Green	23/41, 279 yards, TD, INT
Arkansas	Rushing	Ja'Quinden Jackson	10 carries, 37 yards, TD
Arkansas	Receiving	Isaac TeSlaa	5 receptions, 120 yards, TD
Texas A&M	Passing	Marcel Reed	11/22, 163 yards, 2 TD
Texas A&M	Rushing	Le'Veon Moss	13 carries, 117 yards
Texas A&M	Receiving	Noah Thomas	6 receptions, 109 yards, TD

=== vs. No. 4 Tennessee ===
No. 4 Tennessee Volunteers (4-0) vs Arkansas Razorbacks (3-2) – Game summary

Quarter	1	2	3	4	Total
No. 4 Volunteers	0	0	14	0	14
Razorbacks	3	0	7	9	19

at Donald W. Reynolds Razorback Stadium • Fayetteville, Arkansas

- Date: October 5
- Game time: 6:30 p.m.
- Game attendance: 75,573
- Referee: Kyle Olson
- TV announcers (ABC): Chris Fowler (play-by-play), Kirk Herbstreit (analyst), and Holly Rowe (sideline)

Statistics	TENN	ARK
First downs	16	23
Total yards	332	431
Rushing yards	174	134
Passing yards	158	297
Passing: Comp–Att–Int	17–29–0	21–30–0
Time of possession	24:41	35:19

Team	Category	Player	Statistics
Tennessee	Passing	Nico Iamaleava	17-29, 158 yards
Tennessee	Rushing	Dylan Sampson	22 rushes, 138 yards, 2 TD
Tennessee	Receiving	Squirrel White	7 catches, 38 yards
Arkansas	Passing	Taylen Green	19-27, 266 yards
Arkansas	Rushing	Braylen Russell	8 carries, 62 yards
Arkansas	Receiving	Andrew Armstrong	9 catches, 132 yards

=== vs No. 8 LSU ===
No. 8 LSU Tigers (5-1) vs Arkansas Razorbacks (4-2) – Game summary

Quarter	1	2	3	4	Total
No. 8 Tigers	10	6	8	10	34
Razorbacks	0	7	3	0	10

at Donald W. Reynolds Razorback Stadium • Fayetteville, Arkansas

- Date: October 19
- Game time: 6:00 p.m.
- Game attendance: 75,893
- TV announcers (ESPN): Mark Jones (play-by-play), Roddy Jones (analyst), and Quint Kessenich (sideline reporter)

Statistics	LSU	ARK
First downs	25	15
Total yards	71-384	50-277
Rushing yards	37-158	19-38
Passing yards	253	240
Passing: comp-att-INT	24-35-0	21-31-1
Time of possession	38:53	21:07

Team	Category	Player	Statistics
LSU	Passing	Garrett Nussmeier	23/34, 233 yards
LSU	Rushing	Caden Durham	21 Carries, 101 yards, 3 TD
LSU	Receiving	CJ Daniels	7 receptions, 86 yards
Arkansas	Passing	Taylen Green	21/32, 240 yards, 1 TD, 1 INT
Arkansas	Rushing	Ja'Quinden Jackson	5 carries, 26 yards
Arkansas	Receiving	Andrew Armstrong	7 receptions, 94 yards, 1 TD

=== at Mississippi State ===
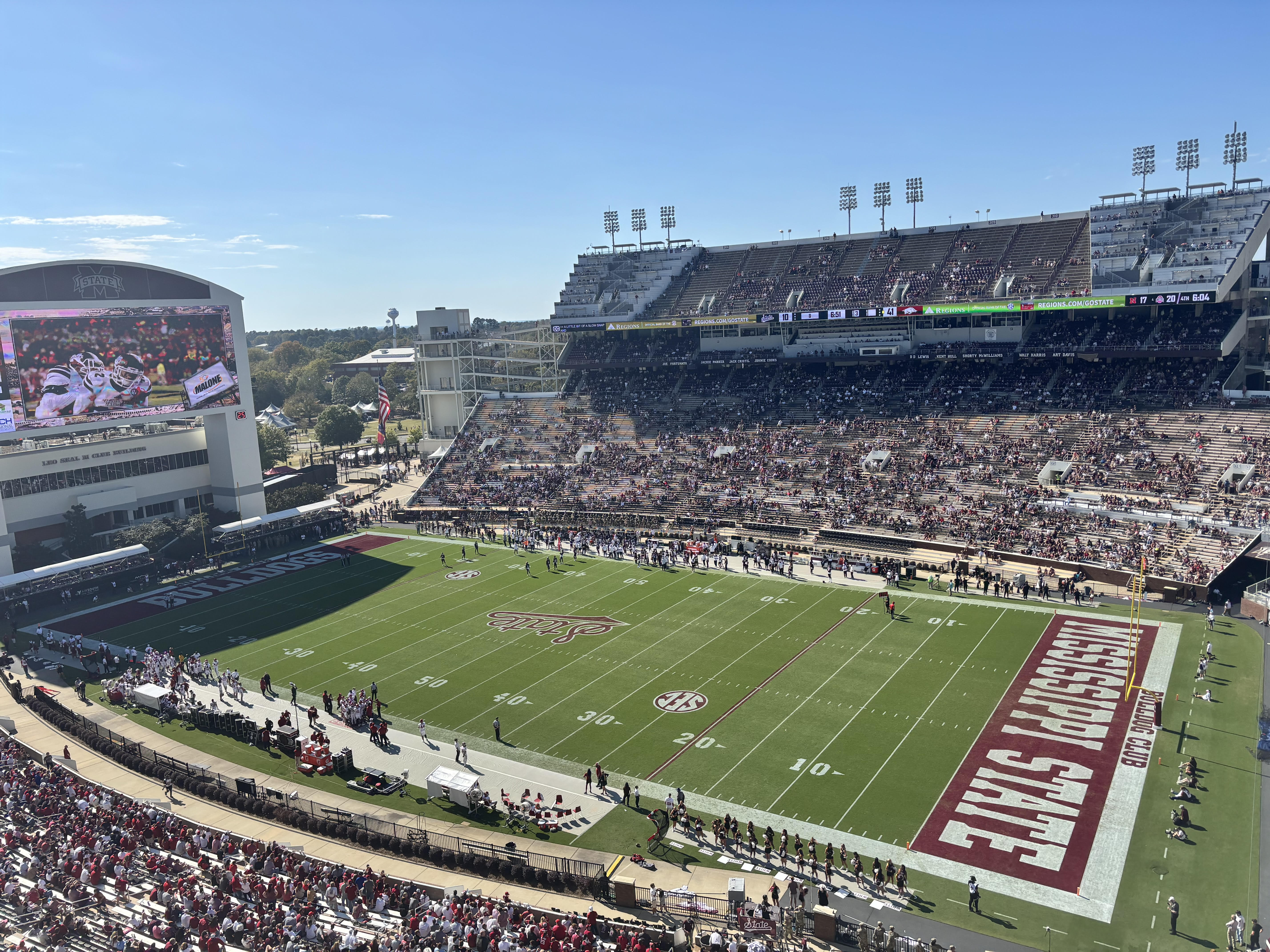
Davis Wade Stadium during the third quarter of the Arkansas–Mississippi State game

Arkansas Razorbacks (4–3) at Mississippi State Bulldogs (1–6) – Game summary

Quarter	1	2	3	4	Total
Razorbacks	17	14	10	17	58
Bulldogs	7	3	15	0	25

at Davis Wade Stadium • Starkville, Mississippi

- Date: October 26
- Game time: 11:45 a.m.
- Game weather: Sunny, 80 °F (27 °C)
- Game attendance: 49,303
- Referee: Lee Hedrick
- TV announcers (SECN): Dave Neal (play-by-play), Aaron Murray (analyst) and Ashley ShahAhmadi (sideline)

Game information
First quarter
- ARK – Taylen Green 8-yard run (Matthew Shipley kick), 13:06. Razorbacks 7–0. Drive: 3 plays, 23 yards, 1:20.
- MSST – Davon Booth 54-yard pass from Michael Van Buren Jr. (Kyle Ferrie kick), 11:45. Tied 7–7. Drive: 5 plays, 75 yards, 1:21.
- ARK – Matthew Shipley 27-yard field goal, 8:50. Razorbacks 10–7. Drive: 7 plays, 66 yards, 2:55.
- ARK – Luke Hasz 14-yard pass from Taylen Green (Matthew Shipley kick), 2:09. Razorbacks 17–7. Drive: 6 plays, 78 yards, 3:17.

Second quarter

- ARK – Jordan Anthony 27-yard pass from Taylen Green (Matthew Shipley kick), 10:50. Razorbacks 24–7. Drive: 5 plays, 76 yards, 1:54.
- MSST – Kyle Ferrie 36-yard field goal, 1:54. Razorbacks 24–10. Drive: 6 plays, 30 yards, 1:16.
- ARK – Andreas Paaske 1-yard pass from Taylen Green (Matthew Shipley kick), 0:16. Razorbacks 31–10. Drive: 8 plays, 75 yards, 1:38.

Third quarter

- ARK – Matthew Shipley 32-yard field goal, 11:23. Razorbacks 34–10. Drive: 7 plays, 62 yards, 3:37.
- ARK – Andreas Paaske 7-yard pass from Taylen Green (Matthew Shipley kick), 6:51. Razorbacks 41–10. Drive: 7 plays, 62 yards, 3:42.
- MSST – Kevin Coleman Jr. 31-yard pass from Michael Van Buren Jr. (Kyle Ferrie kick), 4:40. Razorbacks 41–17. Drive: 6 plays, 75 yards, 2:11.
- MSST – Michael Van Buren Jr. 4-yard run (Michael Van Buren Jr. pass to Kelly Akharaiyi), 3:57. Razorbacks 41–25. Drive: 2 plays, 35 yards, 0:27.

Fourth quarter

- ARK – Matthew Shipley 29-yard field goal, 14:04. Razorbacks 44–25. Drive: 10 plays, 64 yards, 4:53.
- ARK – Luke Hasz 15-yard pass from Taylen Green (Matthew Shipley kick), 5:51. Razorbacks 51–25. Drive: 5 plays, 99 yards, 3:09.
- ARK – Rashod Dubinion 3-yard run (Matthew Shipley kick), 4:50. Razorbacks 58–25. Drive: 2 plays, 12 yards, 0:52.

Statistics	ARK	MSST
First downs	29	24
Total yards	673	471
Rushing yards	359	162
Passing yards	314	309
Passing: Comp–Att–Int	23–29–1	22–31–2
Time of possession	31:15	28:45

Team	Category	Player	Statistics
Arkansas	Passing	Taylen Green	23/29, 314 yards, 5 TD, INT
Arkansas	Rushing	Braylen Russell	16 carries, 175 yards
Arkansas	Receiving	Andrew Armstrong	4 receptions, 76 yards
Mississippi State	Passing	Michael Van Buren Jr.	22/31, 309 yards, 2 TD, 2 INT
Mississippi State	Rushing	Davon Booth	17 carries, 93 yards
Mississippi State	Receiving	Kevin Coleman Jr.	8 receptions, 100 yards, TD

=== vs No. 19 Ole Miss ===
No. 19 Ole Miss Rebels (6–2) vs Arkansas Razorbacks (5–3) – Game summary

Quarter	1	2	3	4	Total
No. 19 Rebels	7	28	21	7	63
Razorbacks	3	7	14	7	31

at Donald W. Reynolds Razorback Stadium • Fayetteville, Arkansas

- Date: November 2
- Game time: 11:00 a.m.
- Game weather: Cloudy, 62 °F (17 °C)
- Game attendance: 72,894
- Referee: Jason Autrey
- TV announcers (ESPN): Mark Jones (play-by-play), Roddy Jones (analyst), and Quint Kessenich (sideline)

Game information

First quarter

- (6:56) Ole Miss - Princely Umanmielen 0 Yd Fumble Return (Caden Davis Kick) (Ole Miss 7–0)
- (3:19) Arkansas - Matthew Shipley 55 Yd Field Goal (Drive: 7 plays, 38 yards, 3:37; Ole Miss 7–3)

Second quarter

- (14:28) Ole Miss - Dae'Quan Wright 4 Yd pass from Jaxson Dart (Caden Davis Kick) (Drive: 11 plays, 75 yards, 3:51; Ole Miss 14–3)
- (12:10) Ole Miss - Jordan Watkins 62 Yd pass from Jaxson Dart (Caden Davis Kick) (Drive: 1 play, 62 yards, 0:08; Ole Miss 21–3)
- (10:07) Ole Miss - Jordan Watkins 66 Yd pass from Jaxson Dart (Caden Davis Kick) (Drive: 2 plays, 68 yards, 0:37; Ole Miss 28–3)
- (5:50) Arkansas - Rashod Dubinion 6 Yd Run (Matthew Shipley Kick) (Drive: 9 plays, 75 yards, 4:17; Ole Miss 28–10)
- (0:05) Ole Miss - Jordan Watkins 3 Yd pass from Jaxson Dart (Caden Davis Kick) (Drive: 8 plays, 73 yards, 1:13; Ole Miss 35–10)

Third quarter

- (12:00) Ole Miss - Jordan Watkins 11 Yd pass from Jaxson Dart (Caden Davis Kick) (Drive: 7 plays, 75 yards, 3:00; Ole Miss 42–10)
- (9:49) Arkansas - Malachi Singleton 13 Yd Run (Matthew Shipley Kick) (Drive: 5 plays, 75 yards, 2:11; Ole Miss 42–17)
- (6:59) Ole Miss - JJ Pegues 1 Yd Run (Caden Davis Kick) (Drive: 6 plays, 79 yards, 2:42; Ole Miss 49–17)
- (4:48) Ole Miss - Jordan Watkins 62 Yd pass from Jaxson Dart (Caden Davis Kick) (Drive: 2 plays, 64 yards, 0:46; Ole Miss 56–17)
- (2:22) Arkansas - Rodney Hill 2 Yd Run (Matthew Shipley Kick) (Drive: 7 plays, 75 yards, 2:26; Ole Miss 56–24)

Fourth quarter

- (6:47) Ole Miss - Dae'Quan Wright 12 Yd pass from Austin Simmons (Caden Davis Kick) (Drive: 10 plays, 80 yards, 5:36; Ole Miss 63–24)
- (3:14) Arkansas - Luke Hasz 22 Yd pass from Malachi Singleton (Matthew Shipley Kick) (Drive: 8 plays, 75 yards, 3:33; Ole Miss 63–31)

Statistics	MISS	ARK
First downs	29	24
Total yards	694	497
Rushing yards	132	132
Passing yards	562	365
Passing: Comp–Att–Int	28–34–0	21–28–0
Time of possession	31:26	28:34

Team	Category	Player	Statistics
Ole Miss	Passing	Jaxson Dart	25/31, 515 yards, 6 TD
Ole Miss	Rushing	Jaxson Dart	10 carries, 47 yards
Ole Miss	Receiving	Jordan Watkins	8 receptions, 254 yards, 5 TD
Arkansas	Passing	Malachi Singleton	11/14, 207 yards, TD
Arkansas	Rushing	Rashod Dubinion	12 carries, 49 yards, TD
Arkansas	Receiving	Andrew Armstrong	6 receptions, 135 yards

=== vs No. 3 Texas ===
No. 3 Texas Longhorns (8–1) vs Arkansas Razorbacks (5–4) – Game summary

Quarter	1	2	3	4	Total
No. 3 Longhorns	7	3	3	7	20
Razorbacks	0	0	7	3	10

at Donald W. Reynolds Razorback Stadium • Fayetteville, Arkansas

- Date: November 16
- Game time: 11:00 a.m.
- Game weather: Sunny • Temperature: 61 °F (16 °C) • Wind: S 12 miles per hour (19 km/h)
- Game attendance: 74,929
- Referee: Steve Marlowe
- TV announcers (ABC): Joe Tessitore (play-by-play), Jesse Palmer (analyst) and Katie George (sideline)

Game information

First quarter

- (7:23) TEX – Matthew Golden 20-yard pass from Quinn Ewers, Bert Auburn kick (Drive: 6 plays, 61 yards, 2:17; Texas 7–0)

Second quarter

- (11:15) TEX – Bert Auburn 39-yard field goal (Drive: 11 plays, 27 yards, 3:45; Texas 10–0)

Third quarter

- (8:36) TEX – Bert Auburn 39-yard field goal (Drive: 7 plays, 36 yards, 2:37; Texas 13–0)
- (3:39) ARK – Ja'Quinden Jackson 1-yard run, Matthew Shipley kick (Drive: 12 plays, 75 yards, 4:57; Texas 13–7)

Fourth quarter

- (12:48) ARK – Matthew Shipley 44-yard field goal (Drive: 10 plays, 39 yards, 4:57; Texas 13–10)
- (9:05) TEX – Matthew Golden 1-yard pass from Quinn Ewers, Bert Auburn kick (Drive: 8 plays, 75 yards, 3:36; Texas 20–10)

Statistics	TEX	ARK
First downs	20	15
Total yards	315	231
Rushing yards	139	82
Passing yards	176	149
Passing: Comp–Att–Int	20–32–0	17–25–1
Time of possession	30:59	29:01

Team	Category	Player	Statistics
Texas	Passing	Quinn Ewers	20/32, 176 yards, 2 TD
Texas	Rushing	Jaydon Blue	14 carries, 83 yards
Texas	Receiving	Isaiah Bond	4 receptions, 48 yards
Arkansas	Passing	Taylen Green	17/25, 149 yards, INT
Arkansas	Rushing	Ja'Quinden Jackson	11 carries, 56 yards, TD
Arkansas	Receiving	Andrew Armstrong	6 receptions, 74 yards

=== vs Louisiana Tech ===
Louisiana Tech Bulldogs (4–6) vs Arkansas Razorbacks (5–5) – Game summary

Quarter	1	2	3	4	Total
Bulldogs	0	0	7	7	14
Razorbacks	0	14	7	14	35

at Donald W. Reynolds Razorback Stadium • Fayetteville, Arkansas

- Date: November 23
- Game time: 3:00 p.m.
- Game weather: Sunny, 70 °F (21 °C)
- Game attendance: 66,041
- Referee: Matt Loeffler
- TV announcers (SECN+/ESPN+): Matt Schumacker (play-by-play) and Dustin Fox (analyst)

Game information
First quarter
- No scoring plays

Second quarter

- ARK – Isaac TeSlaa 11-yard pass from Taylen Green (Matthew Shipley kick), 5:49. Razorbacks 7–0. Drive: 13 plays, 80 yards, 5:54.
- ARK – Taylen Green 41-yard run (Matthew Shipley kick), 1:53. Razorbacks 14–0. Drive: 6 plays, 65 yards, 1:47.

Third quarter

- ARK – Isaac TeSlaa 27-yard pass from Taylen Green (Matthew Shipley kick), 9:54. Razorbacks 21–0. Drive: 1 play, 27 yards, 0:06.
- LT – Eli Finley 2-yard pass from Evan Bullock (Buck Buchanan kick), 3:59. Razorbacks 21–7. Drive: 8 plays, 42 yards, 4:04.

Fourth quarter

- ARK – Taylen Green 8-yard run (Matthew Shipley kick), 14:14. Razorbacks 28–7. Drive: 12 plays, 75 yards, 4:45.
- LT – Jimmy Holiday 20-yard pass from Evan Bullock (Buck Buchanan kick), 5:58. Razorbacks 28–14. Drive: 8 plays, 75 yards, 3:14.
- ARK – Ja'Quinden Jackson 13-yard run (Matthew Shiley kick), 3:01. Razorbacks 35–14. Drive: 7 plays, 86 yards, 2:54.

Statistics	LT	ARK
First downs	16	26
Total yards	229	454
Rushing yards	39	233
Passing yards	190	221
Passing: Comp–Att–Int	26–43–0	20–37–1
Time of possession	31:10	28:50

Team	Category	Player	Statistics
Louisiana Tech	Passing	Evan Bullock	26/43, 190 yards, 2 TD
Louisiana Tech	Rushing	Patrick Rea	1 rush, 26 yards
Louisiana Tech	Receiving	Tru Edwards	8 receptions, 53 yards
Arkansas	Passing	Taylen Green	20/37, 221 yards, 2 TD, INT
Arkansas	Rushing	Rashod Dubinion	15 rushes, 112 yards
Arkansas	Receiving	Andrew Armstrong	8 receptions, 81 yards

=== at No. 21 Missouri ===
Arkansas Razorbacks (6-5) at No. 21 Missouri Tigers (8-3) – Game summary

Quarter	1	2	3	4	Total
Razorbacks	0	7	7	7	21
No. 21 Tigers	7	0	3	18	28

at Faurot Field • Columbia, Missouri

- Date: November 30
- Game time: 2:30 p.m
- Game weather: Light snow, 27 degrees, 5 mph NE winds
- Game attendance: 62,621 (paid attendance, gate attendance was much less)
- Referee: Ken Williamson
- TV announcers (SECN): Taylor Zarzour (play-by-play), Matt Stinchcomb (analyst), and Alyssa Lang (sideline)

Game information

First quarter

- (2:23) MIZ: Marcus Carroll 2 yard run (Blake Craig Kick). 7-0 Missouri

Second quarter

- (9:42) ARK: Ja'Quinden Jackson 2 yard run (Matthew Shipley Kick). Tied 7-7

Third quarter

- (11:41) ARK: Ja'Quinden Jackson 12 yard run (Matthew Shipley Kick). 14-7 Arkansas
- (3:06) MIZ: Blake Craig 28 yard field goal. 14-10 Arkansas

Fourth quarter

- (13:45) MIZ: Marcus Carroll 1 yard run (Blake Craig Kick). 17-14 Missouri
- (9:39) MIZ: Blake Craig 34 yard field goal. 20-14 Missouri
- (4:19) ARK: Ja'Quinden Jackson 9 yard run (Matthew Shipley Kick). 21-20 Arkansas
- (1:53) MIZ: Brady Cook 30 yard run (Brady Cook pass to Luther Burden III for two-point conversion). 28-21 Missouri

Statistics	ARK	MIZZ
First downs	22	18
Total yards	377	361
Rushing yards	148	193
Passing yards	229	168
Passing: Comp–Att–Int	21–35–0	10–20–0
Time of possession	28:21	31:39

Team	Category	Player	Statistics
Arkansas	Passing	Taylen Green	21/35, 229 yards
Arkansas	Rushing	Ja'Quinden Jackson	18 carries, 87 yards, 3 TD
Arkansas	Receiving	Andrew Armstrong	9 receptions, 128 yards
Missouri	Passing	Brady Cook	10/20, 168 yards
Missouri	Rushing	Marcus Carroll	22 carries, 90 yards, 2 TD
Missouri	Receiving	Theo Wease Jr.	4 receptions, 100 yards

=== vs Texas Tech—Liberty Bowl ===
2024 Liberty Bowl
Texas Tech Red Raiders vs. Arkansas Razorbacks – Game summary

Quarter	1	2	3	4	Total
Red Raiders	3	16	0	7	26
Razorbacks	21	3	10	5	39

at Simmons Bank Liberty Stadium, Memphis, Tennessee

- Date: December 27
- Game time: 6:00 p.m. CST
- Game weather: Clear, 57 degrees, 6 mph south winds
- Game attendance: 37,764
- Referee: Chris Coyte
- TV announcers (ESPN): Anish Shroff (play-by-play), Andre Ware (analyst), and Paul Carcaterra (sideline) (ESPN)/Noah Reed (play-by-play) and Charles Arbuckle (analyst) (ESPN Radio)
- Arkansas QB Taylen Green was named game MVP

Game information
First quarter
- ARK – Taylen Green 12-yard run (Matthew Shipley kick), 11:28. Razorbacks 7–0. Drive: 3 plays, 84 yards, 1:29.
- TTU – Gino Garcia 37-yard field goal, 8:19. Razorbacks 7–3. Drive: 6 plays, 56 yards, 3:09.
- ARK – Braylen Russell 1-yard run (Matthew Shipley kick), 7:14. Razorbacks 14–3. Drive: 3 plays, 75 yards, 1:05.
- ARK – Dazmin James 94-yard pass from Taylen Green (Matthew Shipley kick), 2:31. Razorbacks 21–3. Drive: 3 plays, 96 yards, 1:23.

Second quarter

- TTU – Taylen Green sacked in own end zone by Isaac Smith, 13:32. Razorbacks 21–5.
- TTU – J'Koby Williams 54-yard run (Gino Garcia kick), 11:15. Razorbacks 21–12. Drive: 5 plays, 69 yards, 2:17.
- TTU – Jalin Conyers 2-yard run (Gino Garcia kick), 1:58. Razorbacks 21–19. Drive: 8 plays, 98 yards, 3:54.
- ARK – Matthew Shipley 40-yard field goal, 0:00. Razorbacks 24–19. Drive: 11 plays, 53 yards, 1:58.

Third quarter

- ARK – Matthew Shipley 34-yard field goal, 10:52. Razorbacks 27–19. Drive: 10 plays, 78 yards, 4:08.
- ARK – Tyrell Reed Jr. 47-yard pass from Taylen Green (Matthew Shipley kick), 7:07. Razorbacks 34–19. Drive: 4 plays, 77 yards, 2:17.

Fourth quarter

- ARK – Will Hammond sacked in own end zone by Anton Juncaj, 14:21. Razorbacks 36–19.
- ARK – Matthew Shipley 43-yard field goal, 5:02. Razorbacks 39–19. Drive: 7 plays, -1 yards, 3:53.
- TTU – Coy Eakin 15-yard pass from Will Hammond (Gino Garcia kick), 3:06. Razorbacks 39–26. Drive: 6 plays, 70 yards, 1:56.

Statistics	TTU	ARK
First downs	23	20
Total yards	497	559
Rushing yards	217	218
Passing yards	280	341
Turnovers	2	1
Time of possession	30:22	29:38

Team	Category	Player	Statistics
Texas Tech	Passing	Will Hammond	20/34, 280 yards, TD, 2 INT
Texas Tech	Rushing	J'Koby Williams	15 rushes, 123 yards, TD
Texas Tech	Receiving	Caleb Douglas	5 receptions, 115 yards
Arkansas	Passing	Taylen Green	11/21, 341 yards, 2 TD
Arkansas	Rushing	Taylen Green	15 rushes, 81 yards, TD
Arkansas	Receiving	Dazmin James	3 receptions, 137 yards, TD

== Personnel ==
=== Coaching staff ===
Arkansas Razorbacks coaches
Coach	Position	Year	Alma mater
Sam Pittman	Head coach	5th	Pittsburg State (1986)
Scott Fountain	Assistant head coach/Special teams coordinator	5th	Samford (1988)
Bobby Petrino	Offensive coordinator/ quarterbacks coach	1st	Carroll College (1983)
Travis Williams	Defensive coordinator/ Linebackers coach	2nd	Auburn (2005)
Marcus Woodson	co-Defensive coordinator/ Safeties coach	2nd	Ole Miss (2003)
Morgan Turner	Tight ends coach	2nd	Illinois (2009)
Eric Mateos	Offensive line coach	1st	Southwest Baptist (2011)
Ronnie Fouch	Wide receivers coach	1st	Indiana State (2012)
Kolby Smith	Running backs coach	1st	Louisville (2006)
Deke Adams	Defensive line coach	3rd	Southern Miss (1995)
Deron Wilson	Defensive backs coach	2nd	Southern Miss (2013)
Ben Sowders	Strength and conditioning coach	2nd	Western Kentucky (2008)

== Recruits ==
The Razorbacks signed a total of 16 recruits on the first day of the early signing period, December 20, 2023, all from high school for the 2024class. Arkansas also signed junior college player and a 17th high school player in May 2024, bringing the recruiting class total to 18.

College recruiting (2024)
Name	Hometown	School	Height	Weight	Commit date
Charleston Collins; DL	Little Rock, AR.	Mills	6 ft 4 in (1.93 m)	270 lb (120 kg)	Apr 21, 2023
Charleston Collins; DL	Recruit ratings: Rivals: 247Sports: ESPN:				
Bradley Shaw; LB	Hoover, AL.	Hoover	6 ft 1 in (1.85 m)	215 lb (98 kg)	Dec 25, 2023
Bradley Shaw; LB	Recruit ratings: Rivals: 247Sports: ESPN:				
Selman Bridges; CB	Temple, TX.	Lake Belton	6 ft 3 in (1.91 m)	170 lb (77 kg)	Jul 14, 2023
Selman Bridges; CB	Recruit ratings: Rivals: 247Sports: ESPN:				
K.J. Jackson; QB	Montgomery, AL.	St. James School	6 ft 3 in (1.91 m)	215 lb (98 kg)	Apr 9, 2023
K.J. Jackson; QB	Recruit ratings: Rivals: 247Sports: ESPN:				
Braylen Russell; RB	Benton, AR.	Benton	6 ft 1 in (1.85 m)	230 lb (100 kg)	Jul 14, 2023
Braylen Russell; RB	Recruit ratings: Rivals: 247Sports: ESPN:				
Kavion Henderson; DL	Leeds, AL.	Leeds	6 ft 3 in (1.91 m)	240 lb (110 kg)	Nov 6, 2022
Kavion Henderson; DL	Recruit ratings: Rivals: 247Sports: ESPN:				
Julius Pope; ATH	Batesville, MS.	South Panola	6 ft 0 in (1.83 m)	195 lb (88 kg)	Apr 8, 2023
Julius Pope; ATH	Recruit ratings: Rivals: 247Sports: ESPN:				
Justin Logan; LB	Marietta, GA.	Kell	6 ft 2 in (1.88 m)	210 lb (95 kg)	Aug 2, 2023
Justin Logan; LB	Recruit ratings: Rivals: 247Sports: ESPN:				
Tevis Metcalf; ATH	Pinson, AL.	Clay-Chalkville	5 ft 11 in (1.80 m)	185 lb (84 kg)	Apr 22, 2023
Tevis Metcalf; ATH	Recruit ratings: Rivals: 247Sports: ESPN:				
C.J. Brown; WR	Bentonville, AR.	Bentonville	6 ft 0 in (1.83 m)	185 lb (84 kg)	Jun 15, 2023
C.J. Brown; WR	Recruit ratings: Rivals: 247Sports: ESPN:				
Zuri Madison; OL	Lexington, KY.	Frederick Douglass	6 ft 5 in (1.96 m)	315 lb (143 kg)	Jun 27, 2023
Zuri Madison; OL	Recruit ratings: Rivals: 247Sports: ESPN:				
Wyatt Simmons; LB	Searcy, AR.	Harding Academy	6 ft 3 in (1.91 m)	215 lb (98 kg)	Aug 19, 2023
Wyatt Simmons; LB	Recruit ratings: Rivals: 247Sports: ESPN:				
Ahkhari Johnson; CB	Texarkana, TX.	Pleasant Grove	6 ft 0 in (1.83 m)	175 lb (79 kg)	Jun 14, 2023
Ahkhari Johnson; CB	Recruit ratings: Rivals: 247Sports: ESPN:				
Jaden Allen; CB	Aledo, TX.	Aledo	6 ft 0 in (1.83 m)	170 lb (77 kg)	Apr 21, 2023
Jaden Allen; CB	Recruit ratings: Rivals: 247Sports: ESPN:				
Kobe Branham; OL	Ft. Smith, AR.	Southside	6 ft 6 in (1.98 m)	335 lb (152 kg)	Jun 26, 2023
Kobe Branham; OL	Recruit ratings: Rivals: 247Sports: ESPN:				
Krosse Johnson; WR	New Orleans, LA.	Holy Cross	5 ft 9 in (1.75 m)	170 lb (77 kg)	Dec 20, 2023
Krosse Johnson; WR	Recruit ratings: Rivals: 247Sports: ESPN:				
Tyrell Reed; RB	Lawrence, KS.	Hutchinson Community College	5 ft 9 in (1.75 m)	205 lb (93 kg)	May 3, 2024
Tyrell Reed; RB	Recruit ratings: Rivals: 247Sports: ESPN:				
Zachary Taylor; WR	Yoakum, TX.	Yoakum High	6 ft 4 in (1.93 m)	170 lb (77 kg)	May 20, 2024
Zachary Taylor; WR	Recruit ratings: No ratings found				
Overall recruit ranking: Rivals: 26 247Sports: 27 ESPN: 26
Note: In many cases, Scout, Rivals, 247Sports, On3, and ESPN may conflict in their listings of height and weight.; In these cases, the average was taken. ESPN grades are on a 100-point scale.; Sources: "Arkansas Football Commitments". Rivals.; "2024 Team Ranking". Rivals.com.

=== Transfers ===
Arkansas signed 23 players out of the NCAA transfer portal as of June 5, 2024.

Pos.	Portal Rating	Player	Height	Weight	Former school	Year	Hometown	Note
DE	4☆	Anton Juncaj	6'3"	274	Albany	Senior	Slate Hill, NY.	
RB	4☆	Ja'Quinden Jackson	6'2"	228	Utah	Senior	Duncanville, TX.	
LB	4☆	Xavian Sorey	6'3"	225	Georgia	Junior	Campbellton, FL.	
QB	4☆	Taylen Green	6'6"	221	Boise State	Junior	Lewisville, TX.	
OL	4☆	Fernando Carmona	6'5"	324	San Jose State	Junior	Las Vegas, NV.	
OL	3☆	Addison Nichols	6'5"	306	Tennessee	Soph.	Norcross, GA.	
OL	3☆	Keyshawn Blackstock	6'5"	325	Michigan State	Junior	Covington, GA.	
OL	3☆	Joe More	6'5"	306	Syracuse	Senior	Franklin, TN.	
CB	3☆	Marquise Robinson	6'1"	184	South Alabama	Junior	Summit, MS.	
WR	3☆	Jordan Anthony	5'10"	160	Texas A&M	Soph.	Tylertown, MS.	
DB	3☆	Donieko Slaughter	6'0"	190	Tennessee	Senior	Roswell, GA.	
TE	3☆	Andreas Paaske	6'6"	255	Eastern Michigan	Senior	Copenhagen, Denmark	
S	3☆	Miguel Mitchell	6'1"	215	Florida	Junior	Oxford, AL.	
PK	3☆	Matthew Shipley	6'1"	190	Hawaii	Senior	Liberty Hill, TX.	
RB	3☆	Rodney Hill	5'10"	190	Florida A&M	Junior	Statesboro, GA.	
LB	3☆	Larry Worth	6'4"	220	Jacksonville State	Junior	Jacksonville, FL.	
S	3☆	Anthony Switzer	6'0"	210	Utah State	Junior	Augusta, AR.	
LB	3☆	Stephen Dix	6'2"	238	Marshall	Junior	Orlando, FL.	
QB	3☆	Blake Boda	6'4"	210	Coastal Carolina	Soph	Cocoa, FL.	
DT	3☆	Danny Saili	6'3"	355	BYU	Junior	Topeka, KS.	
WR	3☆	Kafre Brown	6'0"	195	South Florida	Junior	Charlotte, NC.	
OL	3☆	Timothy Dawn	6'2"	311	Baylor	Soph.	Camden, AR.	walk-on
PK	3☆	Kyle Ramsey	6'2"	190	Abilene Christian	Senior	Missouri City, TX.	
