= 2024 Liberty Bowl =

Postseason college football bowl game

2024 AutoZone Liberty Bowl
- 66th Liberty Bowl
| Texas Tech Red Raiders | Arkansas Razorbacks |
| (8–4) | (6–6) |
| Big 12 | SEC |
| 26 | 39 |
| Head coach: Joey McGuire | Head coach: Sam Pittman |
| | 1 | 2 | 3 | 4 | Total |
|---|---|---|---|---|---|
| Texas Tech | 3 | 16 | 0 | 7 | 26 |
| Arkansas | 21 | 3 | 10 | 5 | 39 |
- Date: December 27, 2024
- Season: 2024
- Stadium: Simmons Bank Liberty Stadium
- Location: Memphis, Tennessee
- MVP: Taylen Green (QB, Arkansas)
- Favorite: Texas Tech by 3.5
- Referee: Chris Coyte (Big Ten)
- Attendance: 37,764

United States TV coverage
- Network: ESPN; ESPN Radio
- Announcers: Anish Shroff (play-by-play), Andre Ware (analyst), and Paul Carcaterra (sideline) (ESPN); Noah Reed (play-by-play) and Charles Arbuckle (analyst) (ESPN Radio)

The 2024 Liberty Bowl was a college football bowl game played on December 27, 2024, at Simmons Bank Liberty Stadium located in Memphis, Tennessee. The 66th annual Liberty Bowl game featured Texas Tech and Arkansas. The game began at approximately 6:05 p.m. CST and aired on ESPN. The Liberty Bowl was one of the 2024–25 bowl games concluding the 2024 FBS football season. The game was sponsored by automotive retailer AutoZone and was officially known as the AutoZone Liberty Bowl.

== Teams ==
Consistent with conference tie-ins, the game featured the Texas Tech Red Raiders from the Big 12 Conference and the Arkansas Razorbacks from the Southeastern Conference (SEC). This was the 38th meeting between the Red Raiders and Razorbacks; Arkansas led the series with a 29–8 record in their prior meetings. It was the teams' first meeting since 2015. The teams were once conference mates in the Southwest Conference (SWC), which Arkansas left after the 1991 season, then dissolved after the 1995 season.

=== Texas Tech Red Raiders ===
Texas Tech made their second appearance in the Liberty Bowl, having won their only previous appearance in the 2021 edition. The Red Raiders, led by third-year head coach Joey McGuire, finished the regular season with an overall record of 8–4 with a Big 12 record of 6–3. On December 14, Texas Tech announced that starting quarterback Behren Morton would miss the game due to shoulder surgery. True freshman Will Hammond was named the Red Raiders' starter for the bowl game.

=== Arkansas Razorbacks ===
Arkansas made their seventh appearance in the Liberty Bowl, the most by any team to this point in time, having compiled a 3–3 record in prior appearances. The Razorbacks, led by fifth-year head coach Sam Pittman, finished the regular season with an overall record of 6–6 with a SEC record of 3–5.

== Game summary ==
In the first half, after forcing a TTU punt, Arkansas drove down the field quickly and QB Taylen Green scored on a 12-yard run around the right end, giving the Hogs a 7-0 lead. After Tech scored on a 37-yard field goal to cut Arkansas' lead to 7-3, the Razorbacks answered quickly, scoring their second touchdown in less than a minute on a Braylen Russell run to extend their lead to 14-3. Arkansas stopped TTU on a 4th down play in the "Red Zone". Another quick score for Arkansas on a 94-yard pass play from Green to receiving speedster Dazmin James makes the score 21-3, Hogs. Tech finally came alive in the 2nd quarter, pinning Arkansas in their own end zone for a safety to make the score Arkansas-21 and TTU-5. The Red Raiders then finally got into the end zone with a 54-yard run by J'Koby Williams and a 2-yard run a Jalin Conyers to make the score 21-19 Hogs. A field goal by Arkansas kicker Matthew Shipley made the halftime score 24-19.

In the second half, Shipley converted his second field goal of the game to extend the Razorback lead to 27-19. Running back Tyrell Reed caught a 47-yard pass from Green for another long touchdown, making the score 34-19, Arkansas leading with 7:07 to play in the 3rd. A Marquise Robinson interception at the Arkansas 7-yard line stopped a Texas Tech drive with less than 3 minutes to play in the 3rd quarter. After an Arkansas punt by Devin Bale pinned the Red Raiders at their own 2 yard line, the Razorbacks sacked Tech QB Will Hammond for a safety to stretch their lead to 36-19 with 14:21 to play in the game. After another interception by Arkansas, this time by safety Miguel Mitchell who returned the ball from the Arkansas 29 to the TTU 25, the Razorbacks tacked on a third field goal by Shipley with 5:02 to play, making the score Arkansas 39, Texas Tech 19. Tech would add another touchdown with 3:06 to play, a pass from Hammond to receiver Coy Eakin, cutting Arkansas' lead to 39-26. After an unsuccessful onside kick by Tech, the Hogs would run out the rest of the game clock after gaining a first down on runs by Russell and Green.

Final score: Arkansas 39, Texas Tech 26.

Arkansas now leads the series over Texas Tech, 30-8.

2024 AutoZone Liberty Bowl

| Quarter | 1 | 2 | 3 | 4 | Total |
|---|---|---|---|---|---|
| Texas Tech | 3 | 16 | 0 | 7 | 26 |
| Arkansas | 21 | 3 | 10 | 5 | 39 |

at Simmons Bank Liberty Stadium • Memphis, Tennessee

- Date: Friday, December 27, 2024
- Game time: 6:05 p.m. CST
- Game weather: Clear • Temperature: 57 °F (14 °C) • Wind: 6 mph (9.7 km/h) south
- Game attendance: 37,764
- Referee: Chris Coyte
- TV announcers (ESPN): Anish Shroff (play-by-play), Andre Ware (analyst), and Paul Carcaterra (sideline)
- Box score

Game information

First Quarter

- (11:28) ARK – Taylen Green 12 yard run, Matthew Shipley kick (Drive: 3 plays, 84 yards, 1:29; Arkansas 7–0)
- (8:19) TTU – Gino Garcia 37 yard field goal (Drive: 6 plays, 56 yards, 3:09; Arkansas 7–3)
- (7:14) ARK – Braylen Russell 1 yard run, Matthew Shipley kick (Drive: 3 plays, 75 yards, 1:05; Arkansas 14–3)
- (2:31) ARK – Dazmin James 94 yard pass from Taylen Green, Matthew Shipley kick (Drive: 3 plays, 96 yards, 1:23; Arkansas 21–3)

Second Quarter

- (13:32) TTU – Team safety (Drive: 2 plays, -2 yards, 1:14; Arkansas 21–5)
- (11:15) TTU – J'Koby Williams 54 yard run, Gino Garcia kick (Drive: 5 plays, 69 yards, 2:17; Arkansas 21–12)
- (1:58) TTU – Jalin Conyers 2 yard run, Gino Garcia kick (Drive: 8 plays, 42 yards, 1:09; Arkansas 21–19)
- (0:00) ARK – Matthew Shipley 40 yard field goal (Drive: 11 plays, 53 yards, 1:58; Arkansas 24–19)

Third Quarter

- (10:52) ARK – Matthew Shipley 34 yard field goal (Drive: 10 plays, 78 yards, 4:08; Arkansas 27–19)
- (7:07) ARK – Tyrell Reed Jr. 47 yard pass from Taylen Green, Matthew Shipley kick (Drive: 4 plays, 77 yards, 2:17; Arkansas 34–19)

Fourth Quarter

- (14:21) ARK – Team safety (Drive: 2 plays, -2 yards, 0:28; Arkansas 36–19)
- (5:02) ARK – Matthew Shipley 43 yard field goal (Drive: 7 plays, -1 yards, 3:53; Arkansas 39–19)
- (3:06) TTU – Coy Eakin 15 yard pass from Will Hammond, Gino Garcia kick (Drive: 6 plays, 70 yards, 1:56; Arkansas 39–26)

=== Statistics ===
| Statistics | TTU | ARK |
|---|---|---|
| First downs | 23 | 20 |
| Plays–yards | 57–497 | 56–559 |
| Rushes–yards | 37–217 | 45–218 |
| Passing yards | 280 | 341 |
| Passing: comp–att–int | 20–34–2 | 11–21–0 |
| Turnovers | | |
| Time of possession | 30:22 | 29:38 |

| Team | Category | Player | Statistics |
|---|---|---|---|
| Texas Tech | Passing | Will Hammond | 20/34, 280 yards, TD, 2 INT |
| Texas Tech | Rushing | J'Koby Williams | 15 carries, 123 yards, TD |
| Texas Tech | Receiving | Caleb Douglas | 5 receptions, 115 yards |
| Arkansas | Passing | Taylen Green | 11/21, 341 yards, 2 TD |
| Arkansas | Rushing | Taylen Green | 15 carries, 81 yards, TD |
| Arkansas | Receiving | Dazmin James | 3 receptions, 137 yards, TD |
