= 2024 Texas Tech Red Raiders football team =

American college football season

2024 Texas Tech Red Raiders football

Liberty Bowl, L 26–39 vs. Arkansas
- Conference: Big 12 Conference
- Record: 8–5 (6–3 Big 12)
- Head coach: Joey McGuire (3rd season)
- Offensive coordinator: Zach Kittley (3rd season; regular season); Justin Johnson (interim; bowl game)
- Offensive scheme: Air raid
- Defensive coordinator: Tim DeRuyter (3rd season; regular season); C. J. Ah You (interim; bowl game)
- Base defense: 3–4/3–3–5 hybrid
- Home stadium: Jones AT&T Stadium

2024 Big 12 Conference football standings
	Conf.			Overall
Team	W		L	W		L
No. 7 Arizona State y$^	7	–	2	11	–	3
No. 15 Iowa State y	7	–	2	11	–	3
No. 13 BYU	7	–	2	11	–	2
No. 25 Colorado	7	–	2	9	–	4
Baylor	6	–	3	8	–	5
TCU	6	–	3	9	–	4
Texas Tech	6	–	3	8	–	5
Kansas State	5	–	4	9	–	4
West Virginia	5	–	4	6	–	7
Kansas	4	–	5	5	–	7
Cincinnati	3	–	6	5	–	7
Houston	3	–	6	4	–	8
Utah	2	–	7	5	–	7
UCF	2	–	7	4	–	8
Arizona	2	–	7	4	–	8
Oklahoma State	0	–	9	3	–	9
Championship: Arizona State 45, Iowa State 19
^ – College Football Playoff participant; $ – Conference champion; y – Championship game participant; Rankings from AP Poll

The 2024 Texas Tech Red Raiders football team represented Texas Tech University in the 2024 NCAA Division I FBS football season. The Red Raiders played their home games at Jones AT&T Stadium in Lubbock, Texas, and competed as members of the Big 12 Conference. They were led by third-year head coach Joey McGuire. This was the program's 100th season.

On December 1, it was announced that defensive coordinator Tim DeRuyter and secondary coach Marcel Yates had been fired. The Red Raiders finished the regular season with the worst passing defense in the Big 12, allowing 305.3 passing yards per game, which was also the second-most passing yards allowed per game in all of the FBS; only Tulsa allowed more passing yards per game. The following day, December 2, offensive coordinator Zach Kittley was named the new head coach at Florida Atlantic. On December 4, Houston defensive coordinator Shiel Wood was announced as the Red Raiders' new defensive coordinator. On December 6, Texas State offensive coordinator Mack Leftwich was hired as the Red Raiders' new offensive coordinator.

== Offseason ==
=== Transfers ===
Outgoing

Name	No.	Pos.	Height	Weight	Year	Hometown	New school
Tyler Shough	12	QB	6'5	230	Senior	Chandler, AZ	Louisville
Landon Peterson	72	OL	6'6	300	Senior	Odessa, TX	North Texas
Monroe Mills	71	OT	6'6	315	Junior	Columbia, MO	Louisville
Myles Price	1	WR	5'10	190	Senior	The Colony, TX	Indiana
Jerand Bradley	9	WR	6'5	220	Sophomore	DeSoto, TX	Boston College
Nehemiah Martinez I	20	WR	5'9	205	Junior	Lubbock, TX	Abilene Christian
Seth Martin	68	OL	6'3	300	RS Freshman	Fort Worth, TX	Stephen F. Austin
Matt Keeler	66	OT	6'6	305	Sophomore	Chicago, IL	Northwestern
Nate Floyd	4	CB	6'0	190	Sophomore	College Station, TX	Nevada
Tyler King	21	WR	5'9	180	RS Freshman	Houston, TX	Wyoming
Jayden York	15	TE	6'4	250	Junior	Austin, TX	Houston
Loic Fouonji	11	WR	6'4	215	Senior	Midland, TX	Vanderbilt
Brook Honore Jr.	37	P	6'0	185	RS Freshman	Manvel, TX	Arkansas State
J. J. Sparkman	6	WR	6'4	225	Junior	Longview, TX	UTSA
Jacoby Jackson	75	OT	6'6	320	Sophomore	Arlington, TX	Mississippi State
Jesiah Pierre	8	LB	6'2	240	Senior	Mount Dora, FL	UCF
Blake Burris	91	DL	6'5	300	Sophomore	Irving, TX	SMU
Steve Linton	7	OLB	6'5	235	Senior	Dublin, GA	Baylor
Anquan Willis	24	RB	6'0	220	Freshman	Wichita Falls, TX	Incarnate Word
Bryson Donnell	22	RB	5'10	220	RS Freshman	Tyler, TX	UTSA
Tre'Darius Brown	49	DL	6'2	300	Freshman	Natchitoches, LA	South Alabama
Landon Hullaby	23	S	6'0	205	RS Freshman	Mansfield, TX	UTEP
Cameron Watts	21	CB	5'11	200	RS Senior	Tulsa, OK	Stony Brook

Incoming

Name	No.	Pos.	Height	Weight	Year	Hometown	Prev. school
Jovon Jackson	2	S	6'2	195	Junior	Gainesville, VA	Fairmont State
Sterling Porcher	79	OL	6'4	304	Junior	Sumter, SC	Middle Tennessee
Devynn Cromwell	22	S	6'1	195	Senior	Toronto, ON	Guelph
Josh Kelly	3	WR	6'1	191	RS Junior	Fresno, CA	Washington State
Jalin Conyers	12	TE	6'4	270	RS Junior	Gruver, TX	Arizona State
Johncarlos Miller II	82	TE	6'5	242	RS Sophomore	Greensboro, NC	Elon
Jack Burgess	47	P	6'2	215	Junior	Bacchus Marsh, VIC	Weber State
Davion Carter	56	IOL	6'3	274	Junior	Pearl, MS	Memphis
Vinny Sciury	71	OL	6'3	305	Junior	Massillon, OH	Toledo
Caleb Douglas	4	WR	6'3	200	Sophomore	Missouri City, TX	Florida
Cameran Brown	8	QB	6'3	225	RS Freshman	Carrollton, GA	West Georgia
Jason Llewellyn	87	TE	6'5	255	Sophomore	Aledo, TX	Oklahoma
James Hansen	91	DL	6'2	315	RS Senior	Fontana, CA	Nevada
Javeon Wilcox	27	S	6'0	200	Freshman	Temple, TX	TCU
De'Braylon Carroll	52	DL	6'0	300	RS Junior	Duncanville, TX	Rice
Mikal Harrison-Pilot	22	CB	6'0	210	Freshman	Temple, TX	Houston

=== Recruiting class ===
College recruiting
Name	Hometown	School	Height	Weight	Commit date
Lorenzo Johnson Jr. Athlete	Madisonville, TX	Madisonville High School	5 ft 11 in (1.80 m)	175 lb (79 kg)	Feb 4, 2022
Lorenzo Johnson Jr. Athlete	Recruit ratings: Rivals: 247Sports: ESPN:				
Chandlin Myers; Athlete	Hawley, TX	Hawley High School	6 ft 2.5 in (1.89 m)	165 lb (75 kg)	Jul 29, 2022
Chandlin Myers; Athlete	Recruit ratings: Rivals: 247Sports: ESPN:				
Kasen Long; Offensive line	Shallowater, TX	Shallowater High School	6 ft 6 in (1.98 m)	250 lb (110 kg)	Sep 25, 2022
Kasen Long; Offensive line	Recruit ratings: Rivals: 247Sports: ESPN:				
Holton Hendrix; Offensive line	Lubbock, TX	Lubbock-Cooper High School	6 ft 3 in (1.91 m)	275 lb (125 kg)	Nov 27, 2022
Holton Hendrix; Offensive line	Recruit ratings: Rivals: 247Sports: ESPN:				
Will Hammond; Quarterback	Hutto, TX	Hutto High School	6 ft 1.5 in (1.87 m)	190 lb (86 kg)	Dec 11, 2022
Will Hammond; Quarterback	Recruit ratings: Rivals: 247Sports: ESPN:				
Trey Jackson; Tight end	Dallas, TX	South Oak Cliff High School	6 ft 4.5 in (1.94 m)	210 lb (95 kg)	Apr 4, 2023
Trey Jackson; Tight end	Recruit ratings: Rivals: 247Sports: ESPN:				
Cheta Ofili; Linebacker	Sachse, TX	Sachse High School	6 ft 3.5 in (1.92 m)	215 lb (98 kg)	Apr 12, 2023
Cheta Ofili; Linebacker	Recruit ratings: Rivals: 247Sports: ESPN:				
Jacob Ponton; Offensive line	Dripping Springs, TX	Dripping Springs High School	6 ft 7 in (2.01 m)	265 lb (120 kg)	May 8, 2023
Jacob Ponton; Offensive line	Recruit ratings: Rivals: 247Sports: ESPN:				
Cameron Dickey; Athlete	Austin, TX	Crockett High School	5 ft 10 in (1.78 m)	200 lb (91 kg)	Jun 7, 2023
Cameron Dickey; Athlete	Recruit ratings: Rivals: 247Sports: ESPN:				
Ellis Davis; Offensive line	Prosper, TX	Prosper High School	6 ft 7 in (2.01 m)	275 lb (125 kg)	Jun 12, 2023
Ellis Davis; Offensive line	Recruit ratings: Rivals: 247Sports: ESPN:				
Charles Anderson Jr. Defensive end	Pearland, TX	Dawson High School	6 ft 6 in (1.98 m)	240 lb (110 kg)	Jun 18, 2023
Charles Anderson Jr. Defensive end	Recruit ratings: Rivals: 247Sports: ESPN:				
J'Koby Williams; Athlete	Beckville, TX	Beckville High School	5 ft 9 in (1.75 m)	180 lb (82 kg)	Jun 18, 2023
J'Koby Williams; Athlete	Recruit ratings: Rivals: 247Sports: ESPN:				
Tyson Turner; Wide receiver	Bryan, TX	Bryan High School	6 ft 1.5 in (1.87 m)	190 lb (86 kg)	Jun 18, 2023
Tyson Turner; Wide receiver	Recruit ratings: Rivals: 247Sports: ESPN:				
Edward Smith; Defensive end	Pearland, TX	Dawson High School	6 ft 6 in (1.98 m)	250 lb (110 kg)	Jun 27, 2023
Edward Smith; Defensive end	Recruit ratings: Rivals: 247Sports: ESPN:				
Ashton Hampton; Defensive back	Pearland, TX	Pearland High School	5 ft 11.5 in (1.82 m)	160 lb (73 kg)	Jul 1, 2023
Ashton Hampton; Defensive back	Recruit ratings: Rivals: 247Sports: ESPN:				
Oliver Miles III; Athlete	El Campo, TX	El Campo High School	6 ft 1 in (1.85 m)	175 lb (79 kg)	Jul 2, 2023
Oliver Miles III; Athlete	Recruit ratings: Rivals: 247Sports: ESPN:				
Peyton Morgan; Defensive back	Pflugerville, TX	Weiss High School	6 ft 0 in (1.83 m)	175 lb (79 kg)	Jul 2, 2023
Peyton Morgan; Defensive back	Recruit ratings: Rivals: 247Sports: ESPN:				
Isaiah Collins; Defensive back	Huntsville, TX	Huntsville High School	6 ft 3 in (1.91 m)	186 lb (84 kg)	Jul 3, 2023
Isaiah Collins; Defensive back	Recruit ratings: Rivals: 247Sports: ESPN:				
Malik Esquerra; Defensive back	Killeen, TX	Shoemaker High School	6 ft 3 in (1.91 m)	185 lb (84 kg)	Jul 15, 2023
Malik Esquerra; Defensive back	Recruit ratings: Rivals: 247Sports: ESPN:				
Micah Hudson; Wide receiver	Temple, TX	Lake Belton High School	6 ft 1 in (1.85 m)	195 lb (88 kg)	Sep 11, 2023
Micah Hudson; Wide receiver	Recruit ratings: Rivals: 247Sports: ESPN:				
Rylan Vagana; Long snapper	Huntington Beach, CA	Mater Dei High School	6 ft 1 in (1.85 m)	200 lb (91 kg)	Oct 1, 2023
Rylan Vagana; Long snapper	Recruit ratings: Rivals: 247Sports: ESPN:				
Maurice Rodriques; Offensive line	Mission Viego, CA	Saddleback College	6 ft 7 in (2.01 m)	325 lb (147 kg)	Dec 20, 2023
Maurice Rodriques; Offensive line	Recruit ratings: Rivals: 247Sports: ESPN:				
Jackson Hildebrand; Offensive line	San Antonio, TX	Alamo Heights High School	6 ft 4 in (1.93 m)	280 lb (130 kg)	Dec 20, 2023
Jackson Hildebrand; Offensive line	Recruit ratings: Rivals: 247Sports: ESPN:				

2024 Overall class rankings

Website	National rank	Conference rank	5 star recruits	4 star recruits	3 star recruits
ESPN	28th	1st	2	4	15
On3 Recruits	21st	1st	1	5	15
Rivals	23rd	1st	2	4	16
247 Sports	24th	1st	2	4	15

== Preseason ==
=== Big 12 media poll ===
The preseason poll was released on July 2, 2024.

Big 12 preseason poll
Predicted finish	Team	Votes (1st place)
1	Utah	906 (20)
2	Kansas State	889 (19)
3	Oklahoma State	829 (14)
4	Kansas	772 (5)
5	Arizona	762 (3)
6	Iowa State	661
7	West Virginia	581
8	UCF	551
9	Texas Tech	532
10	TCU	436
11	Colorado	400
12	Baylor	268
13	BYU	215
14	Cincinnati	196
15	Houston	157
16	Arizona State	141

=== Award watch lists ===
Award	Player	Position	Year
Maxwell Award	Tahj Brooks	RB	Sr.
Paul Hornung Award	Drae McCray	WR	Sr.
Wuerffel Trophy	Tahj Brooks	RB	Sr.
Walter Camp Award	Tahj Brooks	RB	Sr.
Doak Walker Award	Tahj Brooks	RB	Sr.
Fred Biletnikoff Award	Josh Kelly	WR	Gr.
John Mackey Award	Jalin Conyers	TE	Sr.
Johnny Unitas Golden Arm Award	Behren Morton	QB	Jr.
Earl Campbell Tyler Rose Award	Tahj Brooks	RB	Sr.
Earl Campbell Tyler Rose Award	Behren Morton	QB	Jr.

=== Preseason All-Big 12 Team ===
Position	Player	Class
RB	Tahj Brooks	Sr.
KR/PR	Drae McCray	Sr.

== Schedule ==
Date	Time	Opponent	Site	TV	Result	Attendance
August 31	6:30 p.m.	Abilene Christian*	Jones AT&T Stadium; Lubbock, TX	ESPN+	W 52–51 ^{OT}	60,229
September 7	9:00 p.m.	at Washington State*	Martin Stadium; Pullman, WA	Fox	L 16–37	27,372
September 14	11:00 a.m.	North Texas*	Jones AT&T Stadium; Lubbock, TX	FS1	W 66–21	57,865
September 21	2:30 p.m.	Arizona State	Jones AT&T Stadium; Lubbock, TX	FS1	W 30–22	58,795
September 28	7:00 p.m.	Cincinnati	Jones AT&T Stadium; Lubbock, TX	ESPN2	W 44–41	60,229
October 5	10:00 p.m.	at Arizona	Arizona Stadium; Tucson, AZ	Fox	W 28–22	45,773
October 19	3:00 p.m.	Baylor^{†}	Jones AT&T Stadium; Lubbock, TX (rivalry)	ESPN2	L 35–59	60,229
October 26	2:30 p.m.	at TCU	Amon G. Carter Stadium; Fort Worth, TX (rivalry)	Fox	L 34–35	42,144
November 2	2:30 p.m.	at No. 11 Iowa State	Jack Trice Stadium; Ames, IA	ESPN	W 23–22	61,500
November 9	3:00 p.m.	No. 20 Colorado	Jones AT&T Stadium; Lubbock, TX (Big Noon Kickoff)	Fox	L 27–41	60,229
November 23	2:30 p.m.	at Oklahoma State	Boone Pickens Stadium; Stillwater, OK	ESPN+	W 56–48	52,202
November 30	11:00 a.m.	West Virginia	Jones AT&T Stadium; Lubbock, TX	FS1	W 52–15	52,785
December 27	6:00 p.m.	vs. Arkansas*	Simmons Bank Liberty Stadium; Memphis, TN (Liberty Bowl / rivalry)	ESPN	L 26–39	37,764
*Non-conference game; ^{†}Homecoming; Rankings from AP Poll (and CFP Rankings, after November 5) - Released prior to game; All times are in Central time

== Personnel ==
2024 Texas Tech Red Raiders football team roster
Players
Coaches
Offense

Pos.	#	Name	Class
RB	0	Cam'Ron Valdez (injured)	Jr
WR	1	Micah Hudson	Fr
QB	2	Behren Morton (injured) (C)	Jr
WR	3	Josh Kelly	Sr
WR	4	Jordan Brown	Sr
WR	5	Caleb Douglas	Jr
WR	6	Kelby Valsin	Fr
QB	7	Cameran Brown	So
WR	8	Coy Eakin	So
TE	9	Johncarlos Miller II	Jr
WR	10	Drae McCray	Sr
WR	11	T. J. West	Fr
TE	12	Jalin Conyers	Sr
WR	13	Brady Boyd	Jr
WR	14	Drew Hocutt	Sr
QB	15	Will Hammond	Fr
QB	17	Jake Strong	Fr
WR	18	L. J. Johnson Jr.	Fr
WR	19	Hayden Wiginton	Jr
RB	20	J'Koby Williams	Fr
RB	23	Adam Hill	Fr
RB	28	Tahj Brooks (C)	Sr
RB	32	Jaden Morris	So
RB	33	Cameron Dickey	Fr
WR	37	Curtis Murillo	Fr
TE	39	Charles Robinson	Jr
OL	53	Holton Hendrix	Fr
RG	54	Kaden Carr	Fr
C	56	Davion Carter	Sr
LG	60	Nick Fattig	Fr
OL	62	Tyler Murray	Fr
LG	63	Dylan Shaw	Fr
OL	64	Jurrien Loftin	So
OL	65	D'Anthis Upshaw Jr.	Fr
OL	66	Jackson Hildebrand	Fr
RT	67	Dalton Merryman	Jr
OL	68	Jaxon Hughes	Sr
C	69	Caleb Rodkey	Jr
LT	70	Jacob Ponton	Fr
LG	71	Vinny Sciury (injured)	Sr
C	72	Sheridan Wilson	So
OL	73	Garrett Morphis	Fr
RT	74	Daniel Sill	Fr
RT	75	Ty Buchanan	Jr
RG	76	Caleb Rogers (C)	Sr
LT	77	Maurice Rodrigues	Jr
OL	78	Ellis Davis	Fr
LT	79	Sterling Porcher	Sr
TE	80	Mason Tharp	Sr
WR	82	Price Morgan	Jr
TE	83	Jack Esparaza	So
WR	84	D. J. Crest	Fr
WR	85	Aiden Meeks	Fr
WR	86	Tyson Turner	Fr
WR	87	Chandlin Myers	Fr
TE	88	Trey Jackson	Fr
TE	89	Jason Llewellyn	So

Defense

Pos.	#	Name	Class
SS	0	Bralyn Lux	Sr
DB	1	A. J. McCarty	Jr
DB	2	Jalon Peoples	So
LB	3	Bryce Ramirez (C)	Sr
DB	4	Maurion Horn	So
NT	5	Quincy Ledet Jr.	Sr
DB	7	Brendan Jordan	So
DT	8	E'Maurion Banks (injured)	Jr
SS	9	C. J. Baskerville	Sr
LB	10	Jacob Rodriguez (C)	Jr
OLB	11	Charles Esters III	Jr
DB	12	Macho Stevenson	Fr
LB	13	Ben Roberts	So
OLB	14	Joseph Adedire (injured)	Jr
DB	15	Oliver Miles III	Fr
DB	16	Ashton Hampton	Fr
OLB	17	Isaac Smith	Jr
DB	18	Isaiah Collins	Fr
OLB	19	Dylan Spencer (injured)	So
DB	20	Marcos Ramon-Edwards	Fr
DB	21	Jordan Sanford	So
DB	22	Devynn Cromwell	Fr
DB	23	J'Maury Davis	Fr
DB	24	Malik Esquerra	Fr
FS	25	Chapman Lewis	So
DB	26	Sammy Morris IV	Jr
SS	27	Javeon Wilcox	Fr
FS	28	Peyton Morgan	Fr
DB	29	Chief Collins	Jr
DB	30	Mikal Harrison-Pilot	Fr
FS	31	Joseph Plunk	Sr
OLB	32	Cheta Ofili	Fr
OLB	33	Harvey Dyson III	So
LB	34	Trent Low	Sr
LB	35	Miquel Dingle Jr.	Fr
LB	36	Justin Horn	Fr
DB	37	Miles Thompson	Fr
DB	38	Anthony White	Fr
DB	39	Luke Dillingham	Jr
LB	40	Wesley Smith	So
LB	42	John Curry	Fr
LB	43	Chris Lemons	Fr
OLB	45	Terrell Tilmon	Jr
OLB	46	Isaiah Crawford	Fr
LB	48	Gage Elder	Jr
OLB	50	Eddy Smith	Fr
NT	51	Jayden Cofield	Fr
DT	52	De'Braylon Carroll	Sr
NT	58	Tanner Allen	So
OLB	88	Amier Washington	Fr
OLB	90	Ansel Nedore	Fr
NT	91	James Hansen	Sr
OLB	92	Kasen Long	Fr
DT	94	Braylon Rigsby	Fr
DT	95	Trevon McAlpine	So
DL	96	Keyshawn Williams	Fr
OLB	97	Charles Anderson Jr.	Fr
DL	98	Kendall Allen	Fr
OLB	99	Sam Carrell	Jr

Special teams

Pos.	#	Name	Class
LS	30	Jackson Knotts	Sr
K	38	Reese Burkhardt	Sr
P	41	Jack Burgess	Jr
LS	47	Rylan Vagana	Fr
K	48	Stone Harrington	So
P	84	Kaden Turner	Fr
K	99	Gino Garcia	Sr

Head coach

- Joey McGuire

Coordinators/assistant coaches

- Kenny Perry
  Associate head coach/Special teams/Running backs
- Zach Kittley
  Offensive coordinator/quarterbacks (regular season)
- Tim DeRuyter
  Defensive coordinator (regular season)
- Josh Bookbinder
  Inside linebackers
- C. J. Ah You
  Outside linebackers/interim defensive coordinator
- Marcel Yates
  Passing game coordinator/secondary (regular season)
- Clay McGuire
  Offensive line
- Justin Johnson
  Passing game coordinator/Wide receivers/interim offensive coordinator
- Zarnell Fitch
  Defensive line
- Josh Cochran
  Tight ends
- Lance Barilow
  Strength and conditioning

Legend

- (C) Team captain
- (S) Suspended
- (I) Ineligible
- Injured
- Redshirt

Roster
Last update: October 27, 2024

== Game summaries ==
=== Abilene Christian ===
Abilene Christian Wildcats at Texas Tech Red Raiders – Game summary

Quarter	1	2	3	4	OT	Total
Wildcats	7	14	7	17	6	51
Red Raiders	22	10	7	6	7	52

at Jones AT&T Stadium, Lubbock, Texas

- Date: August 31
- Game time: 6:30 p.m. CDT
- Game weather: Sunny
- Game attendance: 60,229
- Referee: Tim Rich
- TV announcers (ESPN+): Ted Emrich and Dave Steckel
- Box score

Game information
First quarter
- TTU – Tahj Brooks 18-yard run (Gino Garcia kick), 10:38. Red Raiders 7–0. Drive: 10 plays, 71 yards, 3:28.
- TTU – Coy Eakin 4-yard pass from Behren Morton (Jalin Conyers run), 8:18. Red Raiders 15–0. Drive: 2 plays, 17 yards, 0:24.
- ACU – Jed Castles 31-yard pass from Maverick McIvor (Ritse Vaes kick), 3:42. Red Raiders 15–7. Drive: 9 plays, 80 yards, 4:36.
- TTU – Coy Eakin 35-yard pass from Behren Morton (Reese Burkhardt kick), 1:34. Red Raiders 22–7. Drive: 6 plays, 75 yards, 2:08.

Second quarter

- ACU – Isaiah Johnson 2-yard run (Ritse Vaes kick), 11:52. Red Raiders 22–14. Drive: 11 plays, 75 yards, 4:42.
- TTU – Gino Garcia 39-yard field goal, 9:58. Red Raiders 25–14. Drive: 4 plays, 5 yards, 1:38.
- TTU – Jalin Conyers 36-yard pass from Behren Morton (Reese Burkhardt kick), 2:55. Red Raiders 32–14. Drive: 9 plays, 70 yards, 3:51.
- ACU – Blayne Taylor 71-yard pass from Maverick McIvor (Ritse Vaes kick), 1:50. Red Raiders 32–21. Drive: 3 plays, 75 yards, 1:05.

Third quarter

- ACU – Rovaughn Banks Jr. 1-yard run (Ritse Vaes kick), 5:10. Red Raiders 32–28. Drive: 10 plays, 96 yards, 4:27.
- TTU – Josh Kelly 35-yard pass from Behren Morton (Gino Garcia kick), 4:50. Red Raiders 39–28. Drive: 1 play, 35 yards, 0:07.

Fourth quarter

- ACU – Nehemiah Martinez I 30-yard pass from Maverick McIvor (Ritse Vaes kick), 11:45. Red Raiders 39–35. Drive: 4 plays, 62 yards, 1:34.
- TTU – Reese Burkhardt 41-yard field goal, 8:32. Red Raiders 42–35. Drive: 9 plays, 52 yards, 3:13.
- ACU – Isaiah Johnson 5-yard run (Ritse Vaes kick), 4:55. Tied 42–42. Drive: 8 plays, 75 yards, 3:37.
- TTU – Gino Garcia 31-yard field goal, 2:35. Red Raiders 45–42. Drive: 9 plays, 54 yards, 2:13.
- ACU – Ritse Vaes 21-yard field goal, 0:05. Tied 45–45. Drive: 12 plays, 71 yards, 2:34.

Overtime

- TTU – Caleb Douglas 14-yard pass from Behren Morton (Reese Burkhardt kick). Red Raiders 52–45. Drive: 5 plays, 25 yards.
- ACU – Isaiah Johnson 1-yard run (run failed). Red Raiders 52–51. Drive: 6 plays, 25 yards.

Statistics	ACU	TTU
First downs	30	27
Total yards	615	539
Rushing yards	109	161
Passing yards	506	378
Turnovers	1	0
Time of possession	33:48	26:07

Team	Category	Player	Statistics
Abilene Christian	Passing	Maverick McIvor	36/51, 506 yards, 3 TD
Abilene Christian	Rushing	Isaiah Johnson	13 rushes, 42 yards, 3 TD
Abilene Christian	Receiving	Blayne Taylor	7 receptions, 141 yards, TD
Texas Tech	Passing	Behren Morton	30/42, 378 yards, 5 TD
Texas Tech	Rushing	Tahj Brooks	27 rushes, 153 yards, TD
Texas Tech	Receiving	Josh Kelly	10 receptions, 156 yards, TD

=== At Washington State ===
Texas Tech Red Raiders at Washington State Cougars – Game summary

Quarter	1	2	3	4	Total
Red Raiders	3	7	0	6	16
Cougars	7	20	7	3	37

at Martin Stadium, Pullman, Washington

- Date: September 7
- Game time: 9:00 p.m. CDT/7:00 p.m. PDT
- Game weather: Sunny
- Game attendance: 27,372
- Referee: Chris Wiggins
- TV announcers (Fox): Tim Brando, Devin Gardner, and Josh Sims
- Box score, Recap

Game information
First quarter
- WSU – John Mateer 4-yard run (Dean Janikowski kick), 10:03. Cougars 7–0. Drive: 7 plays, 40 yards, 3:20.
- TTU – Gino Garcia 37-yard field goal, 3:31. Cougars 7–3. Drive: 11 plays, 51 yards, 3:37.

Second quarter

- WSU – Wayshawn Parker 43-yard run (Dean Janikowski kick), 8:09. Cougars 14–3. Drive: 1 play, 43 yards, 0:09.
- WSU – Djouvensky Schlenbaker 2-yard run (Dean Janikowski kick), 7:53. Cougars 21–3. Drive: 1 play, 2 yards, 0:01.
- TTU – Johncarlos Miller III 20-yard pass from Coy Eakin (Gino Garcia kick), 5:33. Cougars 21–10. Drive: 6 plays, 75 yards, 2:20.
- WSU – Kyle Williams 21-yard pass from John Mateer (kick failed), 0:25. Cougars 27–10. Drive: 3 plays, 38 yards, 0:31.

Third quarter

- WSU – Djouvensky Schlenbaker 1-yard run (Dean Janikowski kick), 3:13. Cougars 34–10. Drive: 6 plays, 51 yards, 2:23.

Fourth quarter

- TTU – Cameron Dickey 12-yard pass from Behren Morton (pass failed), 9:21. Cougars 34–16. Drive: 7 plays, 61 yards, 1:53.
- WSU – Dean Janikowski 25-yard field goal, 5:57. Cougars 37–16. Drive: 6 plays, 68 yards, 2:06.

Statistics	TTU	WSU
First downs	24	18
Total yards	491	416
Rushing yards	148	301
Passing yards	343	115
Turnovers	4	1
Time of possession	29:55	30:05

Team	Category	Player	Statistics
Texas Tech	Passing	Behren Morton	34/58, 323 yards, TD, 2 INT
Texas Tech	Rushing	Cameran Brown	5 rushes, 70 yards
Texas Tech	Receiving	Josh Kelly	9 receptions, 95 yards
Washington State	Passing	John Mateer	9/19, 115 yards, TD, INT
Washington State	Rushing	John Mateer	21 rushes, 197 yards, TD
Washington State	Receiving	Josh Meredith	2 receptions, 54 yards

=== North Texas ===
North Texas Mean Green at Texas Tech Red Raiders – Game summary

Quarter	1	2	3	4	Total
Mean Green	7	0	7	7	21
Red Raiders	17	35	7	7	66

at Jones AT&T Stadium, Lubbock, Texas

- Date: September 14
- Game time: 11:00 a.m. CDT
- Game weather: Sunny, 82 °F (28 °C)
- Game attendance: 57,865
- Referee: Tutashinda Salaam
- TV announcers (FS1): Dan Hellie and Petros Papadakis
- Box score, Recap

Game information
First quarter
- TTU – Josh Kelly 10-yard pass from Behren Morton (Gino Garcia kick), 10:17. Red Raiders 7–0. Drive: 8 plays, 56 yards, 3:04.
- TTU – Gino Garcia 25-yard field goal, 5:12. Red Raiders 10–0. Drive: 8 plays, 65 yards, 3:55.
- UNT – Wyatt Young 75-yard pass from Chandler Morris (Kali Nguma kick), 5:05. Red Raiders 10–7. Drive: 1 play, 75 yards, 0:07.
- TTU – Tahj Brooks 21-yard run (Reese Burkhardt kick), 0:52. Red Raiders 17–7. Drive: 9 plays, 75 yards, 4:13.

Second quarter

- TTU – Coy Eakin 70-yard pass from Behren Morton (Gino Garcia kick), 10:22. Red Raiders 24–7. Drive: 2 plays, 80 yards, 0:40.
- TTU – Bralyn Lux 44-yard interception return (Reese Burkhardt kick), 9:50. Red Raiders 31–7.
- TTU – Behren Morton 10-yard run (Gino Garcia kick), 9:30. Red Raiders 38–7. Drive: 1 play, 25 yards, 0:13.
- TTU – Johncarlos Miller III 45-yard pass from Behren Morton (Reese Burkhardt kick), 6:05. Red Raiders 45–7. Drive: 4 plays, 75 yards, 1:41.
- TTU – Jalin Conyers 10-yard pass from Behren Morton (Gino Garcia kick), 3:08. Red Raiders 52–7. Drive: 6 plays, 30 yards, 2:47.

Third quarter

- UNT – Jeremiah Aaron 15-yard pass from Chandler Morris (Kali Nguma kick), 9:09. Red Raiders 52–14. Drive: 4 plays, 18 yards, 0:58.
- TTU – J'Koby Williams 3-yard run (Reese Burkhardt kick), 4:06. Red Raiders 59–14. Drive: 4 plays, 43 yards, 1:27.

Fourth quarter

- TTU – Cameron Dickey 1-yard run (Gino Garcia kick), 12:50. Red Raiders 66–14. Drive: 9 plays, 79 yards, 4:35.
- UNT – Shane Porter 1-yard run (Kali Nguma kick), 9:19. Red Raiders 66–21. Drive: 8 plays, 75 yards, 3:31.

Statistics	UNT	TTU
First downs	13	25
Total yards	353	586
Rushing yards	135	232
Passing yards	218	354
Turnovers	3	1
Time of possession	27:29	32:31

Team	Category	Player	Statistics
North Texas	Passing	Chandler Morris	15/27, 162 yards, 2 TD, 3 INT
North Texas	Rushing	Shane Porter	7 rushes, 31 yards, TD
North Texas	Receiving	Wyatt Young	1 reception, 75 yards, TD
Texas Tech	Passing	Behren Morton	15/19, 273 yards, 4 TD
Texas Tech	Rushing	Tahj Brooks	17 rushes, 109 yards, TD
Texas Tech	Receiving	Coy Eakin	1 reception, 70 yards, TD

=== Arizona State ===
Arizona State Sun Devils at Texas Tech Red Raiders – Game summary

Quarter	1	2	3	4	Total
Sun Devils	0	10	6	6	22
Red Raiders	14	3	7	6	30

at Jones AT&T Stadium, Lubbock, Texas

- Date: September 21
- Game time: 2:30 p.m. CDT
- Game weather: Cloudy, 87 °F (31 °C)
- Game attendance: 58,795
- Referee: Henry Johns
- TV announcers (FS1): Eric Collins and Spencer Tillman
- Box score, Recap

Game information
First quarter
- TTU – Johncarlos Miller II 5-yard pass from Behren Morton (Gino Garcia kick), 11:22. Red Raiders 7–0. Drive: 10 plays, 65 yards, 3:38.
- TTU – Josh Kelly 20-yard pass from Behren Morton (Reese Burkhardt kick), 7:42. Red Raiders 14–0. Drive: 6 plays, 38 yards, 2:11.

Second quarter

- ASU – Ian Hershey 34-yard field goal, 13:10. Red Raiders 14–3. Drive: 8 plays, 31 yards, 2:40.
- ASU – Sam Leavitt 1-yard run (Ian Hershey kick), 1:33. Red Raiders 14–10. Drive: 9 plays, 79 yards, 4:01.
- TTU – Gino Garcia 30-yard field goal, 0:08. Red Raiders 17–10. Drive: 8 plays, 64 yards, 1:16.

Third quarter

- TTU – Jalin Conyers 3-yard run (Gino Garcia kick), 8:14. Red Raiders 24–10. Drive: 12 plays, 68 yards, 5:55.
- ASU – Cam Skattebo 3-yard run (kick blocked), 3:39. Red Raiders 24–16. Drive: 3 plays, 80 yards, 1:09.

Fourth quarter

- TTU – Reese Burkhardt 40-yard field goal, 13:36. Red Raiders 27–16. Drive: 12 plays, 43 yards, 5:03.
- TTU – Gino Garcia 39-yard field goal, 6:54. Red Raiders 30–16. Drive: 11 plays, 43 yards, 5:45.
- ASU – Cam Skattebo 3-yard run (pass failed), 1:39. Red Raiders 30–22. Drive: 10 plays, 67 yards, 2:13.

Statistics	ASU	TTU
First downs	22	24
Total yards	376	334
Rushing yards	94	133
Passing yards	282	201
Turnovers	1	0
Time of possession	25:49	34:11

Team	Category	Player	Statistics
Arizona State	Passing	Sam Leavitt	22/38, 282 yards, INT
Arizona State	Rushing	Cam Skattebo	18 rushes, 60 yards, 2 TD
Arizona State	Receiving	Cam Skattebo	6 receptions, 117 yards
Texas Tech	Passing	Behren Morton	24/44, 201 yards, 2 TD
Texas Tech	Rushing	Tahj Brooks	27 rushes, 117 yards
Texas Tech	Receiving	Josh Kelly	10 receptions, 89 yards, TD

=== Cincinnati ===
Cincinnati Bearcats at Texas Tech Red Raiders – Game summary

Quarter	1	2	3	4	Total
Bearcats	14	10	3	14	41
Red Raiders	10	14	10	10	44

at Jones AT&T Stadium, Lubbock, Texas

- Date: September 28
- Game time: 7:00 p.m. CDT
- Game weather: Sunny, 84 °F (29 °C)
- Game attendance: 60,229
- Referee: Cravonne Barrett
- TV announcers (ESPN2): Brian Custer, Rod Gilmore, and Lauren Sisler
- Box score, Recap

Game information
First quarter
- TTU – Gino Garcia 45-yard field goal, 11:33. Red Raiders 3–0. Drive: 8 plays, 38 yards, 3:22.
- CIN – Tony Johnson 15-yard pass from Brendan Sorsby (Nathan Hawks kick), 7:35. Bearcats 7–3. Drive: 7 plays, 68 yards, 3:52.
- CIN – Xzavier Henderson 42-yard pass from Brendan Sorsby (Nathan Hawks kick), 4:59. Bearcats 14–3. Drive: 1 play, 42 yards, 0:08.
- TTU – Coy Eakin 7-yard pass from Behren Morton (Gino Garcia kick), 1:25. Bearcats 14–10. Drive: 7 plays, 75 yards, 3:34.

Second quarter

- CIN – Nathan Hawks 37-yard field goal, 13:27. Bearcats 17–10. Drive: 5 plays, 12 yards, 2:04.
- TTU – Coy Eakin 49-yard pass from Behren Morton (Reese Burkhardt kick), 10:32. Tied 17–17. Drive: 6 plays, 85 yards, 2:50.
- CIN – Evan Pryor 1-yard run (Nathan Hawks kick), 3:47. Bearcats 24–17. Drive: 12 plays, 75 yards, 6:45.
- TTU – Tahj Brooks 1-yard run (Gino Garcia kick), 1:39. Tied 24–24. Drive: 8 plays, 75 yards, 1:59.

Third quarter

- TTU – Tahj Brooks 2-yard run (Gino Garcia kick), 12:27. Red Raiders 31–24. Drive: 6 plays, 38 yards, 1:52.
- CIN – Nathan Hawks 26-yard field goal, 6:39. Red Raiders 31–27. Drive: 11 plays, 72 yards, 5:42.
- TTU – Reese Burkhardt 38-yard field goal, 0:53. Red Raiders 34–27. Drive: 13 plays, 55 yards, 5:46.

Fourth quarter

- TTU – A. J. McCarty 51-yard interception return (Gino Garcia kick), 12:40. Red Raiders 41–27.
- CIN – Manny Covey 71-yard pass from Brendan Sorsby (Nathan Hawks kick), 12:05. Red Raiders 41–34. Drive: 2 plays, 75 yards, 0:35.
- TTU – Gino Garcia 27-yard field goal, 7:50. Red Raiders 44–34. Drive: 9 plays, 66 yards, 4:15.
- CIN – Manny Covey 3-yard pass from Brendan Sorsby (Nathan Hawks kick), 3:24. Red Raiders 44–41. Drive: 10 plays, 75 yards, 4:26.

Statistics	CIN	TTU
First downs	29	21
Total yards	555	482
Rushing yards	129	231
Passing yards	426	251
Turnovers	2	1
Time of possession	32:01	27:59

Team	Category	Player	Statistics
Cincinnati	Passing	Brendan Sorsby	31/45, 426 yards, 4 TD, INT
Cincinnati	Rushing	Brendan Sorsby	12 rushes, 52 yards
Cincinnati	Receiving	Xzavier Henderson	7 receptions, 127 yards, TD
Texas Tech	Passing	Behren Morton	19/29, 251 yards, 2 TD
Texas Tech	Rushing	Tahj Brooks	32 rushes, 172 yards, 2 TD
Texas Tech	Receiving	Josh Kelly	8 receptions, 111 yards

=== At Arizona ===
Texas Tech Red Raiders at Arizona Wildcats – Game summary

Quarter	1	2	3	4	Total
Red Raiders	7	11	0	10	28
Wildcats	3	0	13	6	22

at Arizona Stadium, Tucson, Arizona

- Date: October 5
- Game time: 10:00 p.m. CDT/8:00 p.m. MST
- Game weather: 89 °F (32 °C)
- Game attendance: 45,773
- Referee: Luke Richmond
- TV announcers (Fox): Connor Onion and Mark Helfrich
- Box score, Recap

Game information
First quarter
- TTU – Tahj Brooks 3-yard run (Gino Garcia kick), 5:38. Red Raiders 7–0. Drive: 5 plays, 61 yards, 2:27.
- ARIZ – Tyler Loop 47-yard field goal, 0:22. Red Raiders 7–3. Drive: 11 plays, 46 yards, 5:16.

Second quarter

- TTU – Tahj Brooks 9-yard run (Johncarlos Miller II run), 1:38. Red Raiders 15–3. Drive: 6 plays, 30 yards, 1:13.
- TTU – Gino Garcia 30-yard field goal, 0:00. Red Raiders 18–3. Drive: 4 plays, 76 yards, 0:40.

Third quarter

- ARIZ – Tyler Loop 40-yard field goal, 9:29. Red Raiders 18–6. Drive: 9 plays, 56 yards, 2:56.
- ARIZ – Tyler Loop 30-yard field goal, 6:46. Red Raiders 18–9. Drive: 7 plays, 20 yards, 2:08.
- ARIZ – Quali Conley 3-yard run (Tyler Loop kick), 1:10. Red Raiders 18–16. Drive: 8 plays, 72 yards, 4:37.

Fourth quarter

- ARIZ – Tyler Loop 37-yard field goal, 10:07. Wildcats 19–18. Drive: 6 plays, 25 yards, 4:41.
- TTU – Gino Garcia 41-yard field goal, 2:21. Red Raiders 21–19. Drive: 8 plays, 47 yards, 2:31.
- TTU – Tahj Brooks 32-yard run (Gino Garcia kick), 1:53. Red Raiders 28–19. Drive: 3 plays, 43 yards, 0:19.
- ARIZ – Tyler Loop 52-yard field goal, 0:54. Red Raiders 28–22. Drive: 8 plays, 41 yards, 0:59.

Statistics	TTU	ARIZ
First downs	14	25
Total yards	332	422
Rushing yards	118	121
Passing yards	214	301
Turnovers	2	3
Time of possession	23:39	36:21

Team	Category	Player	Statistics
Texas Tech	Passing	Behren Morton	17/29, 214 yards
Texas Tech	Rushing	Tahj Brooks	21 rushes, 128 yards, 3 TD
Texas Tech	Receiving	Caleb Douglas	5 receptions, 116 yards
Arizona	Passing	Noah Fifita	28/49, 301 yards, 2 INT
Arizona	Rushing	Quali Conley	14 rushes, 97 yards, TD
Arizona	Receiving	Tetairoa McMillan	8 receptions, 161 yards

=== Baylor ===
Baylor Bears at Texas Tech Red Raiders – Game summary

Quarter	1	2	3	4	Total
Bears	7	17	14	21	59
Red Raiders	7	7	7	14	35

at Jones AT&T Stadium, Lubbock, Texas

- Date: October 19
- Game time: 3:00 p.m. CDT
- Game weather: Cloudy, 70 °F (21 °C)
- Game attendance: 60,229
- Referee: Kevin Boitmann
- TV announcers (ESPN2): Beth Mowins, Rod Gilmore, and Lauren Sisler
- Box score, Recap

Game information
First quarter
- BAY – Bryson Washington 1-yard run (Isaiah Hankins kick), 5:54. Bears 7–0. Drive: 4 plays, 60 yards, 0:51.
- TTU – Caleb Douglas 12-yard pass from Behren Morton (Gino Garcia kick), 1:47. Tied 7–7. Drive: 8 plays, 65 yards, 4:07.

Second quarter

- BAY – Bryson Washington 1-yard run (Isaiah Hankins kick), 11:44. Bears 14–7. Drive: 1 play, 1 yard, 0:08.
- BAY – Isaiah Hankins 31-yard field goal, 10:30. Bears 17–7. Drive: 4 plays, 5 yards, 1:02.
- TTU – Caleb Douglas 20-yard pass from Jalin Conyers (Reese Burkhardt kick), 1:54. Bears 17–14. Drive: 10 plays, 80 yards, 4:18.
- BAY – Josh Cameron 6-yard pass from Sawyer Robertson (Isaiah Hankins kick), 0:04. Bears 24–14. Drive: 9 plays, 75 yards, 1:50.

Third quarter

- TTU – Tahj Brooks 31-yard run (Gino Garcia kick), 11:15. Bears 24–21. Drive: 7 plays, 86 yards, 3:01.
- BAY – Josh Cameron 11-yard pass from Sawyer Robertson (Isaiah Hankins kick), 6:17. Bears 31–21. Drive: 9 plays, 75 yards, 4:58.
- BAY – Hal Presley 35-yard pass from Sawyer Robertson (Isaiah Hankins kick), 3:08. Bears 38–21. Drive: 3 plays, 49 yards, 0:53.

Fourth quarter

- BAY – Monaray Baldwin 24-yard pass from Sawyer Robertson (Isaiah Hankins kick), 13:02. Bears 45–21. Drive: 5 plays, 71 yards, 2:01.
- BAY – Josh Cameron 12-yard pass from Sawyer Robertson (Isaiah Hankins kick), 9:41. Bears 52–21. Drive: 4 plays, 30 yards, 2:19.
- TTU – J'Koby Williams 18-yard pass from Behren Morton (pass failed), 6:31. Bears 52–27. Drive: 12 plays, 75 yards, 3:10.
- BAY – Dequan Finn 34-yard run (Isaiah Hankins kick), 5:40. Bears 59–27. Drive: 4 plays, 43 yards, 0:50.
- TTU – Caleb Douglas 7-yard pass from Behren Morton (Behren Morton pass to Josh Kelly), 2:01. Bears 59–35. Drive: 10 plays, 75 yards, 3:39.

Statistics	BAY	TTU
First downs	23	29
Total yards	529	455
Rushing yards	255	149
Passing yards	274	306
Turnovers	0	2
Time of possession	24:07	35:53

Team	Category	Player	Statistics
Baylor	Passing	Sawyer Robertson	21/32, 274 yards, 5 TD
Baylor	Rushing	Bryson Washington	10 rushes, 116 yards, 2 TD
Baylor	Receiving	Josh Cameron	6 receptions, 75 yards, 3 TD
Texas Tech	Passing	Behren Morton	33/49, 286 yards, 3 TD, INT
Texas Tech	Rushing	Tahj Brooks	25 rushes, 125 yards, TD
Texas Tech	Receiving	Caleb Douglas	9 receptions, 99 yards, 3 TD

=== At TCU ===
Texas Tech Red Raiders at TCU Horned Frogs – Game summary

Quarter	1	2	3	4	Total
Red Raiders	3	14	14	3	34
Horned Frogs	14	0	7	14	35

at Amon G. Carter Stadium, Fort Worth, Texas

- Date: October 26
- Game time: 2:30 p.m. CDT
- Game weather: Sunny, 82 °F (28 °C)
- Game attendance: 42,144
- Referee: Stephen Baron
- TV announcers (Fox): Tim Brando, Devin Gardner, and Josh Sims
- Box score, Recap

Game information
First quarter
- TCU – Savion Williams 35-yard run (Kyle Lemmermann kick), 10:48. Horned Frogs 7–0. Drive: 9 plays, 75 yards, 4:12.
- TTU – Gino Garcia 38-yard field goal, 1:45. Horned Frogs 7–3. Drive: 7 plays, 21 yards, 3:15.
- TCU – Savion Williams 75-yard pass from Josh Hoover (Kyle Lemmermann kick), 1:31. Horned Frogs 14–3. Drive: 1 play, 75 yards, 0:14.

Second quarter

- TTU – Reese Burkhardt 4-yard run (Reese Burkhardt kick), 13:09. Horned Frogs 14–10. Drive: 4 plays, 4 yards, 0:53.
- TTU – Tahj Brooks 4-yard run (Gino Garcia kick), 10:44. Red Raiders 17–14. Drive: 3 plays, 59 yards, 0:50.

Third quarter

- TTU – Coy Eakin 13-yard pass from Will Hammond (Reese Burkhardt kick), 12:21. Red Raiders 24–14. Drive: 6 plays, 78 yards, 2:33.
- TTU – Will Hammond 4-yard run (Gino Garcia kick), 6:33. Red Raiders 31–14. Drive: 10 plays, 50 yards, 4:34.
- TCU – Jeremy Payne 1-yard run (Kyle Lemmermann kick), 3:07. Red Raiders 31–21. Drive: 9 plays, 75 yards, 3:19.

Fourth quarter

- TTU – Gino Garcia 24-yard field goal, 11:13. Red Raiders 34–21. Drive: 13 plays, 73 yards, 6:46.
- TCU – D. J. Rogers 8-yard pass from Josh Hoover (Kyle Lemmermann kick), 8:42. Red Raiders 34–28. Drive: 6 plays, 75 yards, 2:31.
- TCU – Eric McAlister 84-yard pass from Josh Hoover (Kyle Lemmermann kick), 5:10. Horned Frogs 35–34. Drive: 2 plays, 89 yards, 0:36.

Statistics	TTU	TCU
First downs	25	18
Total yards	438	461
Rushing yards	180	117
Passing yards	258	344
Turnovers	2	3
Time of possession	37:25	22:35

Team	Category	Player	Statistics
Texas Tech	Passing	Behren Morton	13/22, 137 yards
Texas Tech	Rushing	Tahj Brooks	30 rushes, 121 yards, TD
Texas Tech	Receiving	Caleb Douglas	9 receptions, 140 yards
TCU	Passing	Josh Hoover	21/32, 344 yards, 3 TD, 2 INT
TCU	Rushing	Savion Williams	11 rushes, 72 yards, TD
TCU	Receiving	Eric McAlister	1 reception, 84 yards, TD

=== At No. 11 Iowa State ===
Texas Tech Red Raiders at No. 11 Iowa State Cyclones – Game summary

Quarter	1	2	3	4	Total
Red Raiders	10	0	7	6	23
No. 11 Cyclones	3	10	0	9	22

at Jack Trice Stadium, Ames, Iowa

- Date: November 2
- Game time: 2:30 p.m. CDT
- Game weather: Cloudy, 53 °F (12 °C)
- Game attendance: 61,500
- Referee: Henry Johns
- TV announcers (ESPN): Dave Pasch, Dusty Dvoracek, and Taylor McGregor
- Box score, Recap

Game information
First quarter
- TTU – Josh Kelly 35-yard pass from Behren Morton (Gino Garcia kick), 12:16. Red Raiders 7–0. Drive: 7 plays, 72 yards, 2:39.
- ISU – Kyle Konrardy 49-yard field goal, 8:33. Red Raiders 7–3. Drive: 10 plays, 44 yards, 3:43.
- TTU – Gino Garcia 44-yard field goal, 3:51. Red Raiders 10–3. Drive: 10 plays, 49 yards, 4:42.

Second quarter

- ISU – Kyle Konrardy 37-yard field goal, 9:25. Red Raiders 10–6. Drive: 7 plays, 37 yards, 2:58.
- ISU – Jayden Higgins 20-yard pass from Rocco Becht (Kyle Konrardy kick), 0:04. Cyclones 13–10. Drive: 4 plays, 50 yards, 0:26.

Third quarter

- TTU – Josh Kelly 19-yard pass from Behren Morton (Gino Garcia kick), 1:56. Red Raiders 17–13. Drive: 12 plays, 98 yards, 3:49.

Fourth quarter

- ISU – Kyle Konrardy 21-yard field goal, 12:23. Red Raiders 17–16. Drive: 10 plays, 72 yards, 4:33.
- ISU – Carson Brown 44-yard pass from Rocco Becht (pass failed), 2:11. Cyclones 22–17. Drive: 5 plays, 65 yards, 2:20.
- TTU – Tahj Brooks 5-yard run (pass failed), 0:20. Red Raiders 23–22. Drive: 12 plays, 71 yards, 1:47.

Statistics	TTU	ISU
First downs	21	23
Total yards	366	432
Rushing yards	129	133
Passing yards	237	299
Turnovers	2	2
Time of possession	25:43	34:17

Team	Category	Player	Statistics
Texas Tech	Passing	Behren Morton	21/40, 237 yards, 2 TD, 2 INT
Texas Tech	Rushing	Tahj Brooks	25 rushes, 122 yards, TD
Texas Tech	Receiving	Josh Kelly	8 receptions, 127 yards, 2 TD
Iowa State	Passing	Rocco Becht	23/39, 299 yards, 2 TD, INT
Iowa State	Rushing	Abu Sama	13 rushes, 74 yards
Iowa State	Receiving	Jayden Higgins	10 receptions, 140 yards, TD

=== No. 20 Colorado ===
No. 20 Colorado Buffaloes at Texas Tech Red Raiders – Game summary

Quarter	1	2	3	4	Total
No. 20 Buffaloes	0	10	21	10	41
Red Raiders	13	0	7	7	27

at Jones AT&T Stadium, Lubbock, Texas

- Date: November 9
- Game time: 3:00 p.m. CST
- Game weather: Sunny, 60 °F (16 °C)
- Game attendance: 60,229
- Referee: Tutashinda Salaam
- TV announcers (Fox): Jason Benetti, Brock Huard, and Allison Williams
- Box score, Recap

Game information
First quarter
- TTU – Jalin Conyers 17-yard pass from Behren Morton (Gino Garcia kick), 13:50. Red Raiders 7–0. Drive: 4 plays, 54 yards, 1:04.
- TTU – Gino Garcia 53-yard field goal, 7:04. Red Raiders 10–0. Drive: 9 plays, 43 yards, 4:03.
- TTU – Gino Garcia 39-yard field goal, 2:28. Red Raiders 13–0. Drive: 8 plays, 32 yards, 3:33.

Second quarter

- COLO – LaJohntay Wester 23-yard pass from Shedeur Sanders (Alejandro Mata kick), 7:33. Red Raiders 13–7. Drive: 6 plays, 58 yards, 2:28.
- COLO – Alejandro Mata 25-yard field goal, 0:30. Red Raiders 13–10. Drive: 12 plays, 74 yards, 4:11.

Third quarter

- COLO – Shedeur Sanders 7-yard run (Alejandro Mata kick), 11:00. Buffaloes 17–13. Drive: 9 plays, 75 yards, 4:00.
- TTU – Tahj Brooks 2-yard run (Gino Garcia kick), 7:52. Red Raiders 20–17. Drive: 9 plays, 66 yards, 3:03.
- COLO – Will Sheppard 5-yard pass from Shedeur Sanders (Alejandro Mata kick), 4:25. Buffaloes 24–20. Drive: 7 plays, 73 yards, 3:22.
- COLO – Travis Hunter 24-yard pass from Shedeur Sanders (Alejandro Mata kick), 1:18. Buffaloes 31–20. Drive: 4 plays, 31 yards, 1:58.

Fourth quarter

- COLO – Alejandro Mata 33-yard field goal, 9:46. Buffaloes 34–20. Drive: 5 plays, 24 yards, 1:49.
- TTU – Jalin Conyers 21-yard pass from Behren Morton (Gino Garcia kick), 2:12. Buffaloes 34–27. Drive: 6 plays, 43 yards, 1:32.
- COLO – Shilo Sanders 6-yard fumble return (Alejandro Mata kick), 0:51. Buffaloes 41–27.

Statistics	COLO	TTU
First downs	22	24
Total yards	351	388
Rushing yards	60	113
Passing yards	291	275
Turnovers	0	3
Time of possession	29:36	30:24

Team	Category	Player	Statistics
Colorado	Passing	Shedeur Sanders	30/43, 291 yards, 3 TD
Colorado	Rushing	Isaiah Augustave	10 rushes, 32 yards
Colorado	Receiving	Travis Hunter	9 receptions, 99 yards, TD
Texas Tech	Passing	Behren Morton	24/40, 275 yards, 2 TD, INT
Texas Tech	Rushing	Tahj Brooks	31 rushes, 137 yards, TD
Texas Tech	Receiving	Josh Kelly	8 receptions, 106 yards

=== At Oklahoma State ===
Texas Tech Red Raiders at Oklahoma State Cowboys – Game summary

Quarter	1	2	3	4	Total
Red Raiders	14	7	14	21	56
Cowboys	7	7	14	20	48

at Boone Pickens Stadium, Stillwater, Oklahoma

- Date: November 23
- Game time: 2:30 p.m. CST
- Game weather: Sunny, 72 °F (22 °C)
- Game attendance: 52,202
- Referee: Mike McCabe
- TV announcers (ESPN+): James Westling and Jay Sonnhalter
- Box score, Recap

Game information
First quarter
- TTU – Caleb Douglas 12-yard pass from Behren Morton (Gino Garcia kick), 13:27. Red Raiders 7–0. Drive: 6 plays, 75 yards, 1:29.
- TTU – Mason Tharp 8-yard pass from Behren Morton (Gino Garcia kick), 4:04. Red Raiders 14–0. Drive: 14 plays, 91 yards, 5:29.
- OKST – Ollie Gordon II 68-yard run (Logan Ward kick), 0:23. Red Raiders 14–7. Drive: 3 plays, 91 yards, 1:12.

Second quarter

- OKST – Ollie Gordon II 1-yard run (Logan Ward kick), 5:23. Tied 14–14. Drive: 7 plays, 45 yards, 2:57.
- TTU – Tahj Brooks 25-yard pass from Behren Morton (Gino Garcia kick), 0:05. Red Raiders 21–14. Drive: 12 plays, 92 yards, 2:13.

Third quarter

- OKST – Ollie Gordon II 2-yard run (Logan Ward kick), 13:14. Tied 21–21. Drive: 5 plays, 75 yards, 1:46.
- TTU – Jalin Conyers 32-yard pass from Behren Morton (Gino Garcia kick), 10:26. Red Raiders 28–21. Drive: 9 plays, 81 yards, 2:43.
- OKST – Maealiuaki Smith 13-yard run (Logan Ward kick), 8:47. Tied 28–28. Drive: 4 plays, 75 yards, 1:39.
- TTU – Tahj Brooks 2-yard run (Gino Garcia kick), 6:12. Red Raiders 35–28. Drive: 6 plays, 18 yards, 2:30.

Fourth quarter

- OKST – De'Zhaun Stribling 14-yard pass from Maealiuaki Smith (Logan Ward kick), 13:19. Tied 35–35. Drive: 6 plays, 43 yards, 1:50.
- TTU – Tahj Brooks 40-yard run (Gino Garcia kick), 10:42. Red Raiders 42–35. Drive: 5 plays, 69 yards, 2:32.
- OKST – Rodney Fields Jr. 19-yard run (Logan Ward kick), 8:37. Tied 42–42. Drive: 5 plays, 65 yards, 2:05.
- TTU – Tahj Brooks 1-yard run (Gino Garcia kick), 6:12. Red Raiders 49–42. Drive: 7 plays, 53 yards, 2:17.
- TTU – Jacob Rodriguez 0-yard fumble return (Gino Garcia kick), 4:45. Red Raiders 56–42.
- OKST – Rashod Owens 10-yard pass from Maealiuaki Smith (kick blocked), 2:35. Red Raiders 56–48. Drive: 8 plays, 69 yards, 2:06.

Statistics	TTU	OKST
First downs	31	32
Total yards	543	508
Rushing yards	139	155
Passing yards	404	353
Turnovers	1	2
Time of possession	32:51	27:05

Team	Category	Player	Statistics
Texas Tech	Passing	Behren Morton	35/50, 366 yards, 4 TD, INT
Texas Tech	Rushing	Tahj Brooks	28 rushes, 133 yards, 3 TD
Texas Tech	Receiving	Caleb Douglas	5 receptions, 105 yards, TD
Oklahoma State	Passing	Maealiuaki Smith	26/36, 326 yards, 2 TD, INT
Oklahoma State	Rushing	Ollie Gordon II	15 rushes, 156 yards, 3 TD
Oklahoma State	Receiving	De'Zhaun Stribling	7 receptions, 133 yards, TD

=== West Virginia ===
West Virginia Mountaineers at Texas Tech Red Raiders – Game summary

Quarter	1	2	3	4	Total
Mountaineers	3	0	6	6	15
Red Raiders	6	29	7	10	52

at Jones AT&T Stadium, Lubbock, Texas

- Date: November 30
- Game time: 11:00 a.m. CST
- Game weather: Sunny, 51 °F (11 °C)
- Game attendance: 52,785
- Referee: Michael VanderVelde
- TV announcers (FS1): Eric Collins and Spencer Tillman
- Box score, Recap

Game information
First quarter
- TTU – Gino Garcia 32-yard field goal, 8:27. Red Raiders 3–0. Drive: 10 plays, 42 yards, 2:37.
- WVU – Michael Hayes II 52-yard field goal, 3:47. Tied 3–3. Drive: 8 plays, 41 yards, 4:40.
- TTU – Gino Garcia 23-yard field goal, 1:28. Red Raiders 6–3. Drive: 7 plays, 80 yards, 2:15.

Second quarter

- TTU – Tahj Brooks 2-yard run (Gino Garcia kick), 10:32. Red Raiders 13–3. Drive: 7 plays, 59 yards, 2:11.
- TTU – Mason Tharp 1-yard pass from Behren Morton (Gino Garcia kick), 4:19. Red Raiders 20–3. Drive: 11 plays, 75 yards, 3:42.
- TTU – Tahj Brooks 37-yard run (Jalin Conyers run), 1:35. Red Raiders 28–3. Drive: 4 plays, 53 yards, 1:05.
- TTU – Tahj Brooks 2-yard run (Gino Garcia kick), 0:09. Red Raiders 35–3. Drive: 4 plays, 35 yards, 0:38.

Third quarter

- TTU – Caleb Douglas 31-yard pass from Behren Morton (Gino Garcia kick), 12:48. Red Raiders 42–3. Drive: 9 plays, 75 yards, 2:12.
- WVU – Rodney Gallagher III 15-yard pass from Garrett Greene (pass failed), 2:04. Red Raiders 42–9. Drive: 12 plays, 91 yards, 6:03.

Fourth quarter

- TTU – Gino Garcia 22-yard field goal, 12:17. Red Raiders 45–9. Drive: 12 plays, 77 yards, 4:43.
- WVU – Jahiem White 21-yard run (pass failed), 8:38. Red Raiders 45–15. Drive: 8 plays, 75 yards, 3:40.
- TTU – Will Hammond 4-yard run (Stone Harrington kick), 3:36. Red Raiders 52–15. Drive: 11 plays, 64 yards, 5:01.

Statistics	WVU	TTU
First downs	26	31
Total yards	405	569
Rushing yards	140	210
Passing yards	265	359
Turnovers	3	1
Time of possession	34:42	25:18

Team	Category	Player	Statistics
West Virginia	Passing	Garrett Greene	29/39, 265 yards, TD, 2 INT
West Virginia	Rushing	Jahiem White	14 rushes, 124 yards, TD
West Virginia	Receiving	CJ Donaldson	7 receptions, 73 yards
Texas Tech	Passing	Behren Morton	28/41, 359 yards, 2 TD, INT
Texas Tech	Rushing	Tahj Brooks	23 rushes, 188 yards, 3 TD
Texas Tech	Receiving	Josh Kelly	9 receptions, 150 yards

=== Vs. Arkansas (Liberty Bowl) ===
2024 Liberty Bowl
Texas Tech Red Raiders vs. Arkansas Razorbacks – Game summary

Quarter	1	2	3	4	Total
Red Raiders	3	16	0	7	26
Razorbacks	21	3	10	5	39

at Simmons Bank Liberty Stadium, Memphis, Tennessee

- Date: December 27
- Game time: 6:00 p.m. CST
- Game weather: Clear, 57 °F (14 °C)
- Game attendance: 37,764
- Referee: Chris Coyte
- TV announcers (ESPN): Anish Shroff, Andre Ware, and Paul Carcaterra
- Box score, Recap

Game information
First quarter
- ARK – Taylen Green 12-yard run (Matthew Shipley kick), 11:28. Razorbacks 7–0. Drive: 3 plays, 84 yards, 1:29.
- TTU – Gino Garcia 37-yard field goal, 8:19. Razorbacks 7–3. Drive: 6 plays, 56 yards, 3:09.
- ARK – Braylen Russell 1-yard run (Matthew Shipley kick), 7:14. Razorbacks 14–3. Drive: 3 plays, 75 yards, 1:05.
- ARK – Dazmin James 94-yard pass from Taylen Green (Matthew Shipley kick), 2:31. Razorbacks 21–3. Drive: 3 plays, 96 yards, 1:23.

Second quarter

- TTU – Taylen Green sacked in own end zone by Isaac Smith, 13:32. Razorbacks 21–5.
- TTU – J'Koby Williams 54-yard run (Gino Garcia kick), 11:15. Razorbacks 21–12. Drive: 5 plays, 69 yards, 2:17.
- TTU – Jalin Conyers 2-yard run (Gino Garcia kick), 1:58. Razorbacks 21–19. Drive: 8 plays, 98 yards, 3:54.
- ARK – Matthew Shipley 40-yard field goal, 0:00. Razorbacks 24–19. Drive: 11 plays, 53 yards, 1:58.

Third quarter

- ARK – Matthew Shipley 34-yard field goal, 10:52. Razorbacks 27–19. Drive: 10 plays, 78 yards, 4:08.
- ARK – Tyrell Reed Jr. 47-yard pass from Taylen Green (Matthew Shipley kick), 7:07. Razorbacks 34–19. Drive: 4 plays, 77 yards, 2:17.

Fourth quarter

- ARK – Will Hammond sacked in own end zone by Anton Juncaj, 14:21. Razorbacks 36–19.
- ARK – Matthew Shipley 43-yard field goal, 5:02. Razorbacks 39–19. Drive: 7 plays, -1 yards, 3:53.
- TTU – Coy Eakin 15-yard pass from Will Hammond (Gino Garcia kick), 3:06. Razorbacks 39–26. Drive: 6 plays, 70 yards, 1:56.

Statistics	TTU	ARK
First downs	23	20
Total yards	497	559
Rushing yards	217	218
Passing yards	280	341
Turnovers	2	1
Time of possession	30:22	29:38

Team	Category	Player	Statistics
Texas Tech	Passing	Will Hammond	20/34, 280 yards, TD, 2 INT
Texas Tech	Rushing	J'Koby Williams	15 rushes, 123 yards, TD
Texas Tech	Receiving	Caleb Douglas	5 receptions, 115 yards
Arkansas	Passing	Taylen Green	11/21, 341 yards, 2 TD
Arkansas	Rushing	Taylen Green	15 rushes, 81 yards, TD
Arkansas	Receiving	Dazmin James	3 receptions, 137 yards, TD
