= Behren Morton =

American football player (born 2002)

No. 15 – New England Patriots
- Position: Quarterback
- Roster status: Active

Personal information
- Born: January 17, 2002 (age 24); Lubbock, Texas, U.S.
- Listed height: 6 ft 2 in (1.88 m)
- Listed weight: 218 lb (99 kg)

Career information
- High school: Eastland (Eastland, Texas)
- College: Texas Tech (2021–2025)
- NFL draft: 2026: 7th round, 234th overall pick

Career history
- New England Patriots (2026−present)
- Stats at Pro Football Reference

Behren Morton (born January 17, 2002) is an American professional football quarterback for the New England Patriots of the National Football League (NFL). He played college football for the Texas Tech Raiders and was selected by the Patriots in the seventh round of the 2026 NFL draft.

== Early life ==
Morton was born in Lubbock, Texas and moved to Eastland, Texas when he was 11. He attended Eastland High School, where his father is the head football coach. He became the starting quarterback for the Mavericks as a freshman. Morton was named the MVP of District 5-3A after he passed for 2,435 yards and 18 touchdowns with four interceptions and rushed for 146 yards and four touchdowns. He repeated as the District 5-3A MVP in his junior season after passing for 2,766 yards and 29 touchdowns. As a senior, Morton passed for 3,613 yards with 37 touchdowns against six interceptions and also rushed for 893 yards and 19 touchdowns and was named the District 5-3A MVP for a third straight season. Morton was rated a four-star recruit and committed to play college football at Texas Tech over offers from Baylor, SMU, TCU, and Texas A&M.

== College career ==
Morton played in two games as a true freshman before redshirting the season. He entered his redshirt freshman season as the Red Raiders' third-string quarterback behind starter Tyler Shough and Donovan Smith. Morton saw playing time in four of the team's first five games before being named Texas Tech's starting quarterback after both Shough and Smith suffered injuries. He completed 39 of 62 passes for 379 yards and two touchdowns with one interception and rushed 16 times for 46 yards and one touchdown in his first career start, a 41–31 loss to seventh-ranked Oklahoma State. Morton started the team's following game against West Virginia. He finished the game with 325 passing yards and two touchdowns in the 48–10 win and was named the Big 12 Newcomer of the Week.

Morton began the 2023 season as the Red Raiders' backup, but became the team's starter after Shough fractured his fibula in week 4 against West Virginia. In week 6, against Baylor, Morton threw for a career-high three touchdown passes and rushed for another as Texas Tech won 39–14. In week 7, against Kansas State, Morton exited the game with an undisclosed injury. Morton, who took several big hits in the first half, had been dealing with a sprained AC joint in his throwing shoulder since taking over the starting QB position. Morton would return two games later and lead the Red Raiders to an appearance in the Independence Bowl against California. Texas Tech would win 34–14 with Morton throwing for 256 yards and 3 touchdowns, and would be named the game's offensive MVP.

Prior to the 2024 season, Morton was shut down in spring practices so he could fully recover. In July, Morton announced that he was fully recovered, having seen several specialists throughout the spring for his shoulder. On August 22, 2024, Morton was officially announced as the Red Raiders' opening day starter. On October 26, against TCU, Morton injured his left shoulder and did not play in the second half. Morton returned to practice the following Tuesday and started in the Red Raiders' following game against Iowa State. In week 13, against Oklahoma State, Morton completed 37-of-53 passes for 401 yards and four touchdowns as the Red Raiders won 56–48; for his performance, Morton was named the Earl Campbell Tyler Rose Player of the Week. The Red Raiders were selected for the Liberty Bowl; however, Morton announced he would sit out of the bowl game following shoulder surgery.

During the Red Raiders' 2025 season opener against Arkansas–Pine Bluff, Morton exited the game in the second quarter with an apparent lower-leg injury following a sack. Following the game, head coach Joey McGuire stated that nothing was broken and Morton probably hyper-extended his knee, going down to his shin and calf area, according to the team's medical staff. In week 4, against Utah, Morton exited the game early in the third quarter after taking a hit to the head then subsequently hitting his head against the turf; Morton was replaced by redshirt freshman Will Hammond for the remainder of the game as the Red Raiders won 34–10. Morton exited the Red Raiders' game against Kansas in the second quarter with an apparent knee injury and did not return to the game. On October 17, Will Hammond was named the starting quarterback for the Red Raiders' following game, against Arizona State, though Morton was available to play if needed.

=== Statistics ===
Season	Team	Games			Passing								Rushing			
Season	Team	GP	GS	Record	Comp	Att	Pct	Yards	Avg	TD	Int	Rate	Att	Yards	Avg	TD
2021	Texas Tech	2	0	0–0	1	3	33.3	0	0.0	0	0	33.3	2	15	7.5	0
2022	Texas Tech	9	4	1–3	96	169	56.8	1,117	6.6	7	6	118.9	42	79	1.9	2
2023	Texas Tech	10	8	6–2	182	293	62.1	1,754	6.0	15	8	123.8	46	3	0.1	4
2024	Texas Tech	12	12	8–4	295	466	63.3	3,335	7.2	27	8	139.1	55	–22	–0.4	1
2025	Texas Tech	12	12	11–1	219	332	66.0	2,780	8.4	22	6	154.6	43	–113	–2.6	0
Career		45	36	26–10	793	1,263	62.8	8,989	7.1	71	28	136.7	188	–38	–0.2	7

== Professional career ==
Pre-draft measurables
Height	Weight	Arm length	Hand span	Wingspan	40-yard dash	10-yard split	20-yard split	20-yard shuttle	Three-cone drill	Vertical jump	Broad jump
6 ft 2 1/8 in (1.88 m)	221 lb (100 kg)	30 5/8 in (0.78 m)	9 1/2 in (0.24 m)	6 ft 3 7/8 in (1.93 m)	4.89 s	1.69 s	2.79 s	4.44 s	7.17 s	30.5 in (0.77 m)	9 ft 5 in (2.87 m)
All values from NFL Combine/Pro Day

Morton was selected by the New England Patriots in the seventh round with the 234th overall pick of the 2026 NFL draft.

Morton made his professional debut on August 13, 2026, during the Patriots' first preseason game against the Indianapolis Colts, in which he completed 7 of 13 passes for 66 yards. In the second preseason game versus the Philadelphia Eagles, Morton served as an emergency punter in the first half when Bryce Baringer was unavailable and passed for 129 yards going 13/17 and threw the game-winning touchdown in a two-minute drill in the second half.
