= Will Hammond =

American football player

No. 15 – Texas Tech Red Raiders
- Position: Quarterback
- Class: Junior

Personal information
- Born: Austin, Texas, U.S.
- Listed height: 6 ft 2 in (1.88 m)
- Listed weight: 210 lb (95 kg)

Career information
- High school: Hutto (Hutto, Texas)
- College: Texas Tech (2024–present)
- Stats at ESPN

Will Hammond is an American college football quarterback for the Texas Tech Red Raiders.

== Early life ==
Hammond attended and played football at Hutto High School in Hutto, Texas, outside of Austin. In his senior year, Hammond led all Texas quarterbacks with 3,901 passing yards and 35 passing touchdowns, along with 1,077 rushing yards and 19 rushing touchdowns. Rated as a consensus four-star recruit, Hammond committed to Texas Tech over offers from other programs such as Auburn, Oregon, Penn State, and Texas A&M.

College recruiting
Name	Hometown	School	Height	Weight	Commit date
Will Hammond; Quarterback	Hutto, TX	Hutto High School	6 ft 1.5 in (1.87 m)	190 lb (86 kg)	Dec 11, 2022
Will Hammond; Quarterback	Recruit ratings: Rivals: 247Sports: ESPN:				

== College career ==
Hammond appeared in the second half of the Red Raiders' game against TCU after an injury to starter Behren Morton. Hammond led scoring drives on his first two possessions. On December 14, 2024, the athletic department announced that Morton would miss the Red Raiders' game against Arkansas in the Liberty Bowl, with Hammond being named Texas Tech's starter for the bowl game.

In 2025, Hammond saw some playing time through the Red Raiders' first three games. In week 4, against Utah, Hammond entered the game early in the third quarter after Morton took a hit to the head then subsequently hitting his head against the turf; Hammond would lead Texas Tech on four scoring drives as the Red Raiders would pull away in the fourth quarter to win 34–10. Two games later, against Kansas, Hammond entered the game in the 2nd quarter after Morton was taken the locker room with an apparent leg injury. Hammond was named the Red Raiders' starter for the following game against Arizona State, though Morton was still available for the game. Hammond started the following game against Oklahoma State, exiting the game in the second quarter with a knee injury. The following Monday it was announced that Hammond tore his ACL and would miss the rest of the season.

Hammond was named the Red Raiders' week 1 starting quarterback for the 2026 season against Abilene Christian. In his first game since tearing his ACL, Hammond started the game going 14-for-14 on passes, finishing the game 26-of-33 for 298 yards, a touchdown, and an interception as the Red Raiders won 33–10.

=== Statistics ===
Year	Team	Games			Passing								Rushing			
Year	Team	GP	GS	Record	Comp	Att	Pct	Yards	Avg	TD	Int	Rate	Att	Yards	Avg	TD
2024	Texas Tech	4	1	0–1	35	57	61.4	471	8.3	2	2	135.4	17	49	2.9	2
2025	Texas Tech	8	2	1–1	69	109	63.3	680	6.2	7	3	131.4	43	299	7.0	5
2026	Texas Tech	8	6	5–1	140	206	68.0	1,566	7.6	6	6	135.6	40	110	2.8	2
Career		20	9	6–3	244	372	65.6	2,717	7.3	15	11	134.3	100	458	4.6	9
