= Malachi Singleton =

American football player (born 2004)

No. 3 – Appalachian State Mountaineers
- Position: Quarterback
- Class: Redshirt Junior

Personal information
- Born: June 2, 2004 (age 22)
- Listed height: 6 ft 1 in (1.85 m)
- Listed weight: 235 lb (107 kg)

Career information
- High school: North Cobb (Kennesaw, Georgia)
- College: Arkansas (2023–2024); Purdue (2025); Appalachian State (2026–present)
- Stats at ESPN

Malachi Singleton (born June 2, 2004) is an American college football quarterback for the Appalachian State Mountaineers. He previously played for the Arkansas Razorbacks and Purdue Boilermakers. He was a four-star prospect from North Cobb High School in Kennesaw, Georgia.

Singleton redshirted at Arkansas as a freshman, he did not appear in any games during the 2023 season. He was the backup during the 2024 season behind Taylen Green for the 2024 Arkansas Razorbacks football team. He transferred to Purdue for his redshirt sophomore season.

== Early life ==
Singleton was born to Carlo and Margaret Singleton on June 2, 2004, and has four siblings: Christian, Cobe, Marcus and Courtlyn. He attended North Cobb High School in Kennesaw, Georgia. Coming out of high school, Singleton was rated as a three-star recruit and committed to play college football for the Arkansas Razorbacks over offers from schools such as Cincinnati, Georgia, Georgia Southern, and UCF.

== College career ==
=== Arkansas ===
As a freshman in 2023, Singleton was redshirted and did not appear in any games. In week 6 of the 2024 season, he completed two of three passes for 31 yards while also adding 15 yards and a touchdown on the ground, as he helped lead the Razorbacks on a game-winning drive upsetting Tennessee. For his performance against the Tennessee Volunteers, Singleton was named the SEC freshman of the week. In week 10, Singleton replaced starter Taylen Green and completed 11 of 14 pass attempts for 207 yards and a touchdown, while also adding 44 yards and a touchdown on the ground, in a loss to Ole Miss.

=== Purdue ===
On December 19, 2024, Singleton transferred to the Purdue Boilermakers.

=== Appalachian State ===
On January 6, 2026, Singleton transferred to the Appalachian State. He was named the starter for the upcoming season on August 26, 2026.

=== Statistics ===
College statistics
Season	Team	Games			Passing								Rushing			
Season	Team	GP	GS	Record	Comp	Att	Pct	Yards	Avg	TD	Int	Rate	Att	Yards	Avg	TD
2023	Arkansas	Redshirt														
2024	Arkansas	5	0	—	21	28	75.0	358	12.8	1	0	194.2	17	74	4.4	3
2025	Purdue	11	0	—	38	64	59.4	439	6.9	5	2	136.5	49	202	4.1	1
2026	Appalachian State	4	4	3–1	96	132	72.7	1,206	9.1	7	1	165.5	29	20	0.7	2
Career		20	4	3–1	155	224	69.2	2,003	8.9	13	3	160.8	95	296	3.1	6
