= Arkansas–Texas Tech football rivalry =

American college football rivalry

The Southwest Series
- Arkansas Razorbacks Texas Tech Red Raiders
- First meeting: November 23, 1957; Arkansas, 47–26
- Latest meeting: December 27, 2024; Arkansas, 39–26
- Next meeting: August 31, 2030

Statistics
- Total meetings: 38
- All-time series: Arkansas leads, 30–8
- Largest victory: Arkansas, 49–7 (1978)
- Longest win streak: Arkansas, 9 (1957–1965, 1977–1985)
- Current win streak: Arkansas, 1 (2024–present)

Locations of Arkansas and Texas Tech

The Arkansas–Texas Tech football rivalry is a college football rivalry game between the Razorbacks of the University of Arkansas and the Red Raiders of Texas Tech University.

== History ==
The two schools first met in 1957, with Arkansas defeating Texas Tech by a score of 47–26 in Little Rock, Arkansas. Arkansas won the first nine games in the rivalry before Texas Tech broke through with a 21–16 victory in 1966. The 1963 game was one of six that were not canceled or postponed due to the assassination of President John F. Kennedy the day before. The Red Raiders also defeated the Razorbacks the following year, winning 31–27. After a 30–7 Texas Tech victory in 1976, Arkansas embarked on another nine-game winning streak, winning every year until 1986. Arkansas and Texas Tech played every year from 1957–1991, when the teams were members of the Southwest Conference. In 1992, Arkansas joined the Southeastern Conference, and the two schools have only played twice since: a 49–28 Arkansas victory in 2014 and a 35–24 Texas Tech victory in 2015. The teams met in the 2024 Liberty Bowl; Arkansas won the contest 39–26. The teams are scheduled to meet in the Vegas Kickoff Classic in 2030 and in a home-and-home series for 2031 and 2034.

== Game results ==
Arkansas victories	Texas Tech victories

No.	Date	Location	Winning team		Losing team	
1	November 23, 1957	Little Rock, AR	Arkansas	47	Texas Tech	26
2	November 22, 1958	Lubbock, TX	Arkansas	14	Texas Tech	8
3	November 21, 1959	Little Rock, AR	#13 Arkansas	27	Texas Tech	8
4	November 19, 1960	Lubbock, TX	#7 Arkansas	34	Texas Tech	6
5	November 25, 1961	Little Rock, AR	#9 Arkansas	28	Texas Tech	0
6	November 24, 1962	Lubbock, TX	#7 Arkansas	34	Texas Tech	0
7	November 23, 1963	Fayetteville, AR	Arkansas	27	Texas Tech	20
8	November 21, 1964	Lubbock, TX	#3 Arkansas	17	Texas Tech	0
9	November 20, 1965	Fayetteville, AR	#2 Arkansas	42	#9 Texas Tech	24
10	November 19, 1966	Lubbock, TX	Texas Tech	21	#6 Arkansas	16
11	November 25, 1967	Little Rock, AR	Texas Tech	31	Arkansas	27
12	November 23, 1968	Lubbock, TX	#9 Arkansas	42	Texas Tech	7
13	November 27, 1969	Little Rock, AR	#2 Arkansas	33	Texas Tech	0
14	November 21, 1970	Lubbock, TX	#6 Arkansas	24	#19 Texas Tech	10
15	November 20, 1971	Fayetteville, AR	#13 Arkansas	15	Texas Tech	0
16	November 25, 1972	Lubbock, TX	Arkansas	24	#20 Texas Tech	14
17	November 24, 1973	Little Rock, AR	#12 Texas Tech	24	Arkansas	17
18	November 21, 1974	Lubbock, TX	Arkansas	21	Texas Tech	13
19	November 22, 1975	Fayetteville, AR	#19 Arkansas	31	Texas Tech	14
20	November 27, 1976	Little Rock, AR	#9 Texas Tech	30	Arkansas	7

No.	Date	Location	Winning team		Losing team	
21	November 24, 1977	Lubbock, TX	#6 Arkansas	17	Texas Tech	14
22	December 2, 1978	Fayetteville, AR	#8 Arkansas	49	Texas Tech	7
23	October 13, 1979	Lubbock, TX	Arkansas	20	Texas Tech	6
24	November 29, 1980	Little Rock, AR	Arkansas	22	Texas Tech	16
25	October 10, 1981	Lubbock, TX	Arkansas	26	Texas Tech	14
26	October 9, 1982	Fayetteville, AR	#9 Arkansas	21	Texas Tech	3
27	November 26, 1983	Lubbock, TX	Arkansas	16	Texas Tech	13
28	October 13, 1984	Little Rock, AR	Arkansas	24	Texas Tech	0
29	October 12, 1985	Lubbock, TX	#6 Arkansas	30	Texas Tech	7
30	October 11, 1986	Fayetteville, AR	Texas Tech	17	#8 Arkansas	7
31	October 10, 1987	Lubbock, TX	#20 Arkansas	31	Texas Tech	0
32	October 8, 1988	Little Rock, AR	#20 Arkansas	31	Texas Tech	10
33	October 14, 1989	Lubbock, TX	#7 Arkansas	45	Texas Tech	13
34	October 13, 1990	Fayetteville, AR	Texas Tech	49	Arkansas	44
35	November 9, 1991	Lubbock, TX	Texas Tech	38	Arkansas	21
36	September 13, 2014	Lubbock, TX	Arkansas	49	Texas Tech	28
37	September 19, 2015	Fayetteville, AR	Texas Tech	35	Arkansas	24
38	December 27, 2024	Memphis, TN	Arkansas	39	Texas Tech	26
Series: Arkansas leads 30–8

== See also ==
- List of NCAA college football rivalry games
