= Coy Eakin =

American football player

No. 3 – Texas Tech Red Raiders
- Position: Wide receiver
- Class: (redshirt) Senior

Personal information
- Listed height: 6 ft 2 in (1.88 m)
- Listed weight: 210 lb (95 kg)

Career information
- High school: Stephenville (Stephenville, Texas)
- College: Texas Tech (2022–present)
- Stats at ESPN

Coy Eakin is an American college football wide receiver for the Texas Tech Red Raiders.

== Early life ==
Eakin attended Stephenville High School in Stephenville, Texas. As a senior, he helped lead Stephenville to a state title, recording nine receptions for 187 yards and three touchdowns in the championship game. Eakin finished his senior year totaling 93 receptions for 2,140 yards and 31 touchdowns. He committed to play college football at Texas Tech University over offers from TCU, Washington State, North Texas, and Western Kentucky.

== College career ==
After redshirting in 2022, Eakin's playing time increased in 2023, despite suffering from a broken collarbone twice. He finished his redshirt freshman season with 36 catches for 416 yards and two touchdowns. As a redshirt sophomore in 2024, Eakin tallied 49 receptions for 652 yards and seven touchdowns. Prior to the 2025 season, he changed his jersey number to 3, which is considered a high honor within the Texas Tech program.

| Season | Team | GP | Receiving | | | |
| Season | Team | GP | Rec | Yds | Avg | TD |
|---|---|---|---|---|---|---|
| 2022 | Texas Tech | Redshirted (redshirt) | | | | |
| 2023 | Texas Tech | 10 | 36 | 416 | 11.6 | 2 |
| 2024 | Texas Tech | 13 | 49 | 652 | 13.3 | 7 |
| 2025 | Texas Tech | 13 | 47 | 626 | 13.3 | 6 |
| Career | | 36 | 132 | 1,694 | 12.8 | 15 |
