= Caleb Douglas =

American football player (born 2003)

No. 7 – Miami Dolphins
- Position: Wide Receiver
- Roster status: Active

Personal information
- Born: September 9, 2003 (age 23); Houston, Texas, U.S.
- Listed height: 6 ft 3 in (1.91 m)
- Listed weight: 208 lb (94 kg)

Career information
- High school: Hightower (Missouri City, Texas)
- College: Florida (2022–2023); Texas Tech (2024–2025)
- NFL draft: 2026: 3rd round, 75th overall pick

Career history
- Miami Dolphins (2026–present)

Awards and highlights
- Second-team All-Big 12 (2025)

Career NFL statistics as of Week 10, 2026
- Receptions: 22
- Receiving yards: 367
- Touchdowns: 2
- Stats at Pro Football Reference

Caleb Douglas (born September 9, 2003) is an American professional football wide receiver for the Miami Dolphins of the National Football League (NFL). He played college football for the Florida Gators and the Texas Tech Red Raiders and was selected by the Dolphins in the third round of the 2026 NFL draft.

== Early life ==
Douglas attended Hightower High School in Missouri City, Texas. As a senior, he was the District 10-5A Co-Offensive MVP after recording 51 receptions for 984 yards and five touchdowns. He committed to the University of Florida to play college football.

== College career ==
Douglas started two of eight games his true freshman year at Florida in 2022, recording 10 receptions for 175 yards and two touchdowns. As a sophomore in 2023, he started the first five games of the season before fracturing his fibula, causing him to miss the rest of the season. He ended the year with 11 receptions for 133 yards and a touchdown. After the season, Douglas entered the transfer portal and transferred to Texas Tech University. In his first year at Texas Tech in 2024, he started all 13 games and finished second on the team with 60 receptions for 877 yards and six touchdowns.

=== College statistics ===
Season	Team	GP	Receiving			
Season	Team	GP	Rec	Yds	Avg	TD
2022	Florida	8	10	175	17.5	2
2023	Florida	5	11	133	12.1	1
2024	Texas Tech	13	60	877	14.6	6
2025	Texas Tech	13	54	846	15.7	7
Career		39	135	2,031	15.0	16

== Professional career ==
Pre-draft measurables
Height	Weight	Arm length	Hand span	Wingspan	40-yard dash	10-yard split	20-yard split	Vertical jump	Broad jump
6 ft 3 1/2 in (1.92 m)	206 lb (93 kg)	32 1/2 in (0.83 m)	10 1/8 in (0.26 m)	6 ft 8 3/8 in (2.04 m)	4.39 s	1.55 s	2.57 s	31.5 in (0.80 m)	10 ft 6 in (3.20 m)
All values from NFL Combine

Douglas was selected by the Miami Dolphins in the third round with the 75th overall pick in the 2026 NFL draft. In Week 7 of the 2026 Season, Douglas had 2 Receptions for 70 Yards and 2 Touchdowns including a game winning 63-yard catch.
