= J'Koby Williams =

American football player

No. 20 – Texas Tech Red Raiders
- Position: Running back
- Class: Junior

Personal information
- Listed height: 5 ft 10 in (1.78 m)
- Listed weight: 185 lb (84 kg)

Career information
- High school: Beckville (Beckville, Texas)
- College: Texas Tech (2024–present)

Awards and highlights
- Third-team All-Big 12 (2025)
- Stats at ESPN

J'Koby Williams is an American football running back for the Texas Tech Red Raiders.

== Early life ==
Williams attended Beckville High School located in Beckville, Texas. Coming out of high school, he committed to play college football for the Texas Tech Red Raiders over offers from other schools such as Baylor, Houston, LSU, Michigan, TCU, and UTSA.

== College career ==
In week one of the 2024 season, Williams scored his first career touchdown in a blowout win versus North Texas. He finished his freshman season in 2024, rushing for 236 yards and two touchdowns on 41 carries, while also notching ten receptions for 100 yards and a touchdown. In week one of the 2025 season, Williams rushed for 56 yards and a touchdown on six carries in a blowout victory versus Arkansas–Pine Bluff. In week three, he rushed 13 times for 48 yards and a touchdown, while also bringing in seven passes for 116 yards and a touchdown in a win over Oregon State. In week nine, Williams hauled in three passes for 60 yards and a touchdown, while also returning a kickoff 99 yards for a touchdown in a blowout win over Oklahoma State. In week ten, he rushed 17 times for 135 yards and a touchdown, while also making two catches for five yards in a victory against Kansas State. For his performance during the 2025 season, Williams was named a semifinalist for the Paul Hornung Award.

== Personal life ==
Williams is related to former NFL linebacker Demorrio Williams.
