= 2023 Texas Tech Red Raiders football team =

American college football season

2023 Texas Tech Red Raiders football

Independence Bowl champion

Independence Bowl, W 34–14 vs. California
- Conference: Big 12 Conference
- Record: 7–6 (5–4 Big 12)
- Head coach: Joey McGuire (2nd season)
- Offensive coordinator: Zach Kittley (2nd season)
- Offensive scheme: Air raid
- Defensive coordinator: Tim DeRuyter (2nd season)
- Base defense: 3–4/3–3–5 hybrid
- Home stadium: Jones AT&T Stadium

2023 Big 12 Conference football standings
	Conf.			Overall
Team	W		L	W		L
No. 3 Texas y$^	8	–	1	12	–	2
No. 16 Oklahoma State y	7	–	2	10	–	4
No. 15 Oklahoma	7	–	2	10	–	3
Iowa State	6	–	3	7	–	6
No. 18 Kansas State	6	–	3	9	–	4
West Virginia	6	–	3	9	–	4
Texas Tech	5	–	4	7	–	6
No. 23 Kansas	5	–	4	9	–	4
UCF	3	–	6	6	–	7
TCU	3	–	6	5	–	7
Houston	2	–	7	4	–	8
BYU	2	–	7	5	–	7
Baylor	2	–	7	3	–	9
Cincinnati	1	–	8	3	–	9
Championship: Texas 49, Oklahoma State 21
^ – College Football Playoff participant; $ – Conference champion; y – Championship game participant; Rankings from AP Poll

The 2023 Texas Tech Red Raiders football team represented Texas Tech University in the 2023 NCAA Division I FBS football season. The Red Raiders played their home games at Jones AT&T Stadium in Lubbock, Texas, and competed in the Big 12 Conference. They were led by second-year head coach Joey McGuire.

The team started 0–2 for the first time since 1990, after losing to both Wyoming and Oregon. The Red Raiders would win their first game of the season in week 3, defeating FCS Tarleton State 41–3. However, starting quarterback Tyler Shough would be injured the following week against West Virginia as the Red Raiders lost 13–20. The team rebounded and finished the rest of the season going 5–3, including an upset win over no. 16 Kansas on the road, to finish the regular season 6–6 with a Big 12 record of 5–4. The Red Raiders were invited to the Independence Bowl, where they defeated California 34–14.

== Offseason ==
=== Coaching changes ===
On January 10, passing game coordinator and receivers coach Emmett Jones left Texas Tech to take the same position with the Oklahoma Sooners. The following day, January 11, Baylor running backs coach Justin Johnson was hired to replace Jones.

=== Recruiting class ===
College recruiting
Name	Hometown	School	Height	Weight	Commit date
Isaiah Crawford; Edge	Post, TX	Post High School	6 ft 4 in (1.93 m)	210 lb (95 kg)	Nov 14, 2021
Isaiah Crawford; Edge	Recruit ratings: Scout: Rivals: 247Sports: ESPN:				
Kaden Carr; Offensive line	Lubbock, TX	Lubbock-Cooper High School	6 ft 5 in (1.96 m)	320 lb (150 kg)	Nov 15, 2021
Kaden Carr; Offensive line	Recruit ratings: Scout: Rivals: 247Sports: ESPN:				
John Curry; Linebacker	Lubbock, TX	Coronado High School	6 ft 2 in (1.88 m)	195 lb (88 kg)	Nov 29, 2021
John Curry; Linebacker	Recruit ratings: Scout: Rivals: 247Sports: ESPN:				
Daniel Sill; Offensive line	College Station, TX	A&M Consolidated High School	6 ft 5 in (1.96 m)	290 lb (130 kg)	Dec 12, 2021
Daniel Sill; Offensive line	Recruit ratings: Scout: Rivals: 247Sports: ESPN:				
Jake Strong; Quarterback	Justin, TX	Northwest High School	6 ft 2 in (1.88 m)	200 lb (91 kg)	Jan 22, 2022
Jake Strong; Quarterback	Recruit ratings: Scout: Rivals: 247Sports: ESPN:				
Chapman Lewis; Safety	Burleson, TX	Centennial High School	6 ft 1 in (1.85 m)	170 lb (77 kg)	Jan 30, 2022
Chapman Lewis; Safety	Recruit ratings: Scout: Rivals: 247Sports: ESPN:				
Tyrone West; Wide receiver	Humble, TX	Humble High School	6 ft 1 in (1.85 m)	190 lb (86 kg)	Jan 30, 2022
Tyrone West; Wide receiver	Recruit ratings: Scout: Rivals: 247Sports: ESPN:				
Anquan Willis; Athlete	Wichita Falls, TX	S. H. Rider High School	6 ft 0 in (1.83 m)	220 lb (100 kg)	Jan 31, 2022
Anquan Willis; Athlete	Recruit ratings: Scout: Rivals: 247Sports: ESPN:				
Brenden Jordan; Safety	Mansfield, TX	Mansfield High School	6 ft 0 in (1.83 m)	200 lb (91 kg)	Feb 13, 2022
Brenden Jordan; Safety	Recruit ratings: Scout: Rivals: 247Sports: ESPN:				
Jmaury Davis; Athlete	Clarendon, TX	Clarendon High School	6 ft 2 in (1.88 m)	190 lb (86 kg)	Feb 14, 2022
Jmaury Davis; Athlete	Recruit ratings: Scout: Rivals: 247Sports: ESPN:				
Marcus Ramon-Edwards; Athlete	Lubbock, TX	Trinity Christian School	6 ft 3 in (1.91 m)	200 lb (91 kg)	Feb 14, 2022
Marcus Ramon-Edwards; Athlete	Recruit ratings: Scout: Rivals: 247Sports: ESPN:				
Amier Washington; Defensive line	Orange, TX	Little Cypress-Mauriceville High School	6 ft 2 in (1.88 m)	245 lb (111 kg)	Apr 2, 2022
Amier Washington; Defensive line	Recruit ratings: Scout: Rivals: 247Sports: ESPN:				
Chris Palfreeman; Wide receiver	Fort Worth, TX	All Saints Episcopal School	5 ft 8 in (1.73 m)	155 lb (70 kg)	Apr 13, 2022
Chris Palfreeman; Wide receiver	Recruit ratings: Scout: Rivals: 247Sports: ESPN:				
Tre'Darius Brown; Defensive line	Natchitoches, LA	Natchitoches Central High School	6 ft 3 in (1.91 m)	300 lb (140 kg)	Apr 20, 2022
Tre'Darius Brown; Defensive line	Recruit ratings: Scout: Rivals: 247Sports: ESPN:				
Jayden Cofield; Defensive line	Manor, TX	Manor High School	6 ft 3 in (1.91 m)	325 lb (147 kg)	Apr 23, 2022
Jayden Cofield; Defensive line	Recruit ratings: Scout: Rivals: 247Sports: ESPN:				
Dylan Shaw; Offensive line	Corpus Christi, TX	Flour Bluff High School	6 ft 4 in (1.93 m)	300 lb (140 kg)	Apr 23, 2022
Dylan Shaw; Offensive line	Recruit ratings: Scout: Rivals: 247Sports: ESPN:				
Demarion Crest-Daniels; Wide receiver	El Paso, TX	Parkland High School	6 ft 3 in (1.91 m)	185 lb (84 kg)	Apr 25, 2022
Demarion Crest-Daniels; Wide receiver	Recruit ratings: Scout: Rivals: 247Sports: ESPN:				
Miquel Dingle Jr. Linebacker	Duncan, SC	James F. Byrnes High School	6 ft 1 in (1.85 m)	215 lb (98 kg)	Jun 21, 2022
Miquel Dingle Jr. Linebacker	Recruit ratings: Scout: Rivals: 247Sports: ESPN:				
Marquez Stevenson; Athlete	Shreveport, LA	Captain Shreve High School	6 ft 0 in (1.83 m)	170 lb (77 kg)	Jun 27, 2022
Marquez Stevenson; Athlete	Recruit ratings: Scout: Rivals: 247Sports: ESPN:				
Braylon Rigsby; Defensive line	Woodville, TX	Woodville High School	6 ft 2 in (1.88 m)	287 lb (130 kg)	Jun 28, 2022
Braylon Rigsby; Defensive line	Recruit ratings: Scout: Rivals: 247Sports: ESPN:				
Nick Fattig; Offensive line	League City, TX	Clear Springs High School	6 ft 4 in (1.93 m)	275 lb (125 kg)	Jul 1, 2022
Nick Fattig; Offensive line	Recruit ratings: Scout: Rivals: 247Sports: ESPN:				
Kelby Valsin; Wide receiver	Arlington, TX	Bowie High School	6 ft 1 in (1.85 m)	180 lb (82 kg)	Jul 4, 2022
Kelby Valsin; Wide receiver	Recruit ratings: Scout: Rivals: 247Sports: ESPN:				
Jordan Sanford; Safety	Arlington, TX	Mansfield Timberview High School	5 ft 11 in (1.80 m)	185 lb (84 kg)	Aug 4, 2022
Jordan Sanford; Safety	Recruit ratings: Scout: Rivals: 247Sports: ESPN:				
Ansel Nedore; Defensive line	Round Rock, TX	Round Rock High School	6 ft 4 in (1.93 m)	260 lb (120 kg)	Aug 13, 2022
Ansel Nedore; Defensive line	Recruit ratings: Scout: Rivals: 247Sports: ESPN:				
Justin Horne; Linebacker	New Orleans, LA	John Curtis Christian School	6 ft 2 in (1.88 m)	201 lb (91 kg)	Dec 19, 2022
Justin Horne; Linebacker	Recruit ratings: Scout: Rivals: 247Sports: ESPN:				
Dylan Spencer; Defensive line	Houston, TX	C. E. King High School	6 ft 4 in (1.93 m)	240 lb (110 kg)	Dec 19, 2022
Dylan Spencer; Defensive line	Recruit ratings: Scout: Rivals: 247Sports: ESPN:				
Aiden Meeks; Wide receiver	Rockwall, TX	Rockwall High School	5 ft 10 in (1.78 m)	170 lb (77 kg)	Dec 31, 2022
Aiden Meeks; Wide receiver	Recruit ratings: Scout: Rivals: 247Sports: ESPN:				

=== Transfers ===
Outgoing

Name	No.	Pos.	Height	Weight	Year	Hometown	New school
Philip Blidi	96	DL	6'3	295	Junior	Portales, NM	Indiana
Trey Cleveland	10	WR	6'4	190	Junior	Arlington, TX	North Texas
Syncere Massey	90	DL	6'5	330	Freshman	Cedar Hill, TX	Abilene Christian
Kobee Minor	3	DB	6'0	185	Sophomore	Lake Dallas, TX	Indiana
Reggie Pearson Jr.	22	DB	5'11	200	Senior	Detroit, MI	Oklahoma
Donovan Smith	7	QB	6'5	230	Sophomore	Las Vegas, NV	Houston

Incoming

Name	No.	Pos.	Height	Weight	Year	Hometown	Prev. school
C. J. Baskerville	6	S	6'2	210	Sophomore	North Richland Hills, TX	San Diego State
Quincy Ledet	5	DL	6'2	294	Sophomore	Orange, TX	Louisiana–Monroe
Steve Linton	17	DL	6'5	219	RS Sophomore	Dublin, GA	Syracuse
Bralyn Lux	12	DB	5'11	175	Senior	San Jose, CA	Fresno State
Drae McCray	10	WR	5'9	177	Sophomore	Tallahassee, FL	Austin Peay
Rusty Staats	53	OL	6'4	310	RS Junior	Watertown, TN	Western Kentucky
Terrell Tilmon	34	OLB	6'5	225	Freshman	Mansfield, TX	Oregon

== Preseason ==
=== Big 12 media poll ===
The preseason poll was released on July 6, 2023.

Big 12 media poll
Predicted finish	Team	Votes (1st place)
1	Texas	886 (41)
2	Kansas State	858 (14)
3	Oklahoma	758 (5)
4	Texas Tech	729 (4)
5	TCU	727 (3)
6	Baylor	572
7	Oklahoma State	470 (1)
8	UCF	463
9	Kansas	461
10	Iowa State	334
11	BYU	318
12	Houston	215
13	Cincinnati	202
14	West Virginia	129

=== Award watch lists ===
Award	Player	Position	Year
Dodd Trophy	Joey McGuire	HC	—
Maxwell Award	Tyler Shough	QB	Sr
Outland Trophy	Jaylon Hutchings	DL	(redshirt) Sr
Ray Guy Award	Austin McNamara	P	(redshirt) Sr
Wuerffel Trophy	Tony Bradford Jr.	DL	(redshirt) Sr
Doak Walker Award	Tahj Brooks	RB	Sr
Fred Biletnikoff Award	Jerand Bradley	WR	So
Rimington Trophy	Rusty Staats	OL	(redshirt) Sr
Bronko Nagurski Trophy	Jaylon Hutchings	DL	(redshirt) Sr
Bednarik Award	Jaylon Hutchings	DL	(redshirt) Sr
Lombardi Award	Jaylon Hutchings	DL	(redshirt) Sr
Earl Campbell Tyler Rose Award	Jerand Bradley	WR	So
Earl Campbell Tyler Rose Award	Tahj Brooks	RB	Sr
Earl Campbell Tyler Rose Award	Tyler Shough	QB	(redshirt) Sr

== Schedule ==
Date	Time	Opponent	Site	TV	Result	Attendance
September 2	6:30 p.m.	at Wyoming*	War Memorial Stadium; Laramie, WY	CBS	L 33–35 ^{2OT}	26,450
September 9	6:00 p.m.	No. 13 Oregon*	Jones AT&T Stadium; Lubbock, TX	Fox	L 30–38	56,200
September 16	6:00 p.m.	Tarleton State*	Jones AT&T Stadium; Lubbock, TX	ESPN+	W 41–3	56,200
September 23	2:30 p.m.	at West Virginia	Milan Puskar Stadium; Morgantown, WV	ESPN+	L 13–20	50,071
September 30	2:30 p.m.	Houston	Jones AT&T Stadium; Lubbock, TX (rivalry)	FS2	W 49–28	53,308
October 7	7:00 p.m.	at Baylor	McLane Stadium; Waco, TX (rivalry)	ESPN2	W 39–14	44,620
October 14	6:00 p.m.	Kansas State^{†}	Jones AT&T Stadium; Lubbock, TX	FS1	L 21–38	56,200
October 21	6:00 p.m.	at BYU	LaVell Edwards Stadium; Provo, UT	FS1	L 14–27	63,523
November 2	6:00 p.m.	TCU	Jones AT&T Stadium; Lubbock, TX (rivalry)	FS1	W 35–28	51,185
November 11	11:00 a.m.	at No. 16 Kansas	David Booth Kansas Memorial Stadium; Lawrence, KS	FS1	W 16–13	47,233
November 18	4:30 p.m.	UCF	Jones AT&T Stadium; Lubbock, TX	FS2	W 24–23	53,851
November 24	6:30 p.m.	at No. 7 Texas	Darrell K Royal–Texas Memorial Stadium; Austin, TX (rivalry)	ABC	L 7–57	102,452
December 16	8:15 p.m.	vs. California*	Independence Stadium; Shreveport, LA (Independence Bowl)	ESPN	W 34–14	33,071
*Non-conference game; ^{†}Homecoming; Rankings from AP Poll (and CFP Rankings, after October 31) - Released prior to game; All times are in Central time

Schedule source:

== Personnel ==
2023 Texas Tech Red Raiders football team roster
Players
Coaches
Offense

Pos.	#	Name	Class
RB	0	Cam'Ron Valdez	So
WR	1	Myles Price (C)	Sr
QB	2	Behren Morton (C)	So
WR	4	Jordan Brown	Jr
WR	6	J. J. Sparkam	Jr
WR	8	Coy Eakin	Fr
WR	9	Jerand Bradley	So
WR	10	Drae McCray	Jr
WR	11	Loic Fouonji	Sr
QB	12	Tyler Shough (injured) (C)	Sr
WR	13	Brady Boyd	Jr
WR	14	Xavier White	Sr
TE	15	Jayden York	Jr
RB	16	Jaden Morris	Fr
QB	17	Jake Strong	Fr
QB	18	Will Burns	Fr
WR	19	Haydon Wiginton	So
WR	20	Nehemiah Martinez	Jr
WR	21	Tyler King	Fr
RB	22	Bryson Donnell	Fr
RB	24	Anquan Willis	Fr
RB	25	JMaury Davis	Fr
RB	28	Tahj Brooks	Sr
TE	33	Matthew Young	Sr
TE	39	Charles Robinson	So
FB	43	Henry Teeter	Sr
OL	53	Rusty Staats (C)	Sr
OL	54	Kaden Carr	Fr
OL	56	Dennis Wilburn	Sr
OL	60	Nick Fattig	Fr
OL	63	Dylan Shaw	Fr
OL	64	Jurrien Loft	Fr
OL	65	Sheridan Wilson	Fr
OL	66	Matt Keeler	So
OL	67	Dalton Merryman	So
OL	68	Seth Martin	Fr
OL	69	Caleb Rodkey	So
OL	70	Cole Spencer (C)	Sr
OL	71	Monroe Mills	Jr
OL	72	Landon Peterson	Sr
OL	74	Daniel Sill	Fr
OL	75	Jacoby Jackson	So
OL	76	Caleb Rogers	Sr
OL	77	Garret Morphis	Fr
OL	79	Ty Buchanan	So
TE	80	Mason Tharp	Jr
WR	82	Drew Hocutt	Jr
TE	83	Jack Esparza	Fr
WR	84	D. J. Crest	Fr
WR	85	Aiden Meeks	Fr
WR	86	T. J. West	Fr
WR	87	Kelby Valsin	Fr
TE	88	Baylor Cupp (C)	Sr

Defense

Pos.	#	Name	Class
DB	0	Rayshad Williams (C)	Sr
DB	1	Dadrion Taylor-Demerson (C)	Sr
DB	2	Jalon Peoples	Fr
OLB	3	Bryce Ramierz (C)	Sr
DB	4	Nate Floyd	So
DL	5	Quincy Ledet Jr.	Sr
OLB	6	Myles Cole (C)	Sr
OLB	7	Steve Linton	Sr
LB	8	Jesiah Pierre	Sr
DB	9	C. J. Baskerville	Jr
LB	10	Jacob Rodriguez	Jr
OLB	11	Charles Esters III	So
DB	12	Bralyn Lux	Sr
LB	13	Ben Roberts	Fr
OLB	14	Joseph Adedire	So
DL	15	Robert Wooten	Jr
DB	16	Macho Stevenson	Fr
OLB	17	Isaac Smith (injured)	So
DB	18	Tyler Owens	Sr
DB	19	A. J. McCarty	Jr
OLB	19	Dylan Spencer	Fr
DB	20	Marcus Ramon-Edwards	Fr
DB	21	Cameron Watts	Sr
DB	22	Maurion Horn	Fr
DB	23	Landon Hullaby	Fr
DB	24	Malik Dunlap	Sr
DB	25	Chapman Lewis	Fr
DB	26	Sammy Morris IV	So
DB	27	Brenden Jordan	Fr
DB	28	Jordan Sanford	Fr
DB	29	Chief Collins	So
DB	30	Miles Thompson	Fr
DB	31	Joseph Plunk	Jr
LB	32	Tyrique Matthews	Sr
LB	34	Bryce Robinson	Sr
LB	35	Miquel Dingle	Fr
LB	36	Justin Horn	Fr
DB	37	James Grando	Jr
DB	38	Anthony White	Fr
DB	39	Luke Dillingham	So
LB	40	Wesley Smith	So
LB	41	Ty Kana	Fr
LB	42	John Curry	Fr
OLB	43	Chris Lemons	Fr
OLB	45	Terrell Tilmon	So
OLB	46	Isaiah Crawford	Fr
DL	47	Tanner Allen	Fr
LB	48	Gage Elder	So
DL	49	Tre'Darius Brown	Fr
LB	50	Trent Low	Jr
DL	51	Jayden Cofield	Fr
OLB	52	Harvey Dyson III	Fr
OLB	90	Ansel Nedore	Fr
DL	91	Blake Burris	So
DL	93	Trevon McAlpine	Fr
DL	94	Braylon Rigsby	Fr
DL	95	Jaylon Hutchings (C)	Sr
DL	96	Amier Washington	Fr
DL	97	Tony Bradford Jr. (C)	Sr
DL	98	E'Maurion Banks	So
OLB	99	Sam Carrell	So

Special teams

Pos.	#	Name	Class
LS	30	Jackson Knotts	Jr
P	31	Austin McNamara (C)	Sr
P	37	Brook Honore Jr.	Fr
K	38	Reese Burkhardt	Jr
LS	47	Jacob Mauch	Sr
K	99	Gino Garcia	Sr

Head coach

- Joey McGuire

Coordinators/assistant coaches

- Zach Kittley
  Offensive coordinator/quarterbacks
- Tim DeRuyter
  Defensive coordinator
- Josh Bookbinder
  Inside linebackers
- C. J. Ah You
  Outside linebackers
- Marcel Yates
  Passing game coordinator/secondary
- Kenny Perry
  Associate head coach/Special teams/Running backs
- Stephen Hamby
  Offensive line
- Justin Johnson
  Passing game coordinator/Wide receivers
- Zarnell Fitch
  Defensive line
- Josh Cochran
  Tight ends
- Lance Barilow
  Strength and conditioning

Legend

- (C) Team captain
- (S) Suspended
- (I) Ineligible
- Injured
- Redshirt

Roster
Last update: September 24, 2023

== Game summaries ==
=== At Wyoming ===
Texas Tech Red Raiders at Wyoming Cowboys – Game summary

Quarter	1	2	3	4	OT	2OT	Total
Red Raiders	17	0	0	3	7	6	33
Cowboys	0	10	7	3	7	8	35

at War Memorial Stadium, Laramie, Wyoming

- Date: September 2
- Game time: 6:30 p.m. CDT/5:30 p.m. MDT
- Game weather: Cloudy, 72 °F (22 °C)
- Game attendance: 26,450
- Referee: Stephen Baron
- TV announcers (CBS): Rich Waltz, Aaron Taylor, and Amanda Guerra
- Box score, Recap

Game information
First quarter
- TTU – Myles Price 33-yard pass from Tyler Shough (Gino Garcia kick), 10:34. Red Raiders 7–0. Drive: 6 plays, 76 yards, 1:49.
- TTU – Jayden York 19-yard pass from Tyler Shough (Gino Garcia kick), 9:25. Red Raiders 14–0. Drive: 2 plays, 26 yards, 0:42.
- TTU – Gino Garcia 54-yard field goal, 4:02. Red Raiders 17–0. Drive: 4 plays, -4 yards, 1:10.

Second quarter

- WYO – John Hoyland 56-yard field goal, 14:55. Red Raiders 17–3. Drive: 9 plays, 37 yards, 4:07.
- WYO – Caleb Driskell 4-yard pass from Andrew Peasley (John Hoyland kick), 11:20. Red Raiders 17–10. Drive: 5 plays, 56 yards, 2:30.

Third quarter

- WYO – Sam Scott 16-yard run (John Hoyland kick), 5:37. Tied 17–17. Drive: 13 plays, 76 yards, 7:31.

Fourth quarter

- WYO – John Hoyland 31-yard field goal, 8:58. Cowboys 20–17. Drive: 14 plays, 65 yards, 6:14.
- TTU – Gino Garcia 27-yard field goal, 0:41. Tied 20–20. Drive: 13 plays, 69 yards, 2:58.

Overtime

- WYO – Andrew Peasley 5-yard run (John Hoyland kick). Cowboys 27–20. Drive: 5 plays, 25 yards.
- TTU – Tahj Brooks 1-yard run (Gino Garcia kick). Tied 27–27. Drive: 5 plays, 25 yards.

Second overtime

- TTU – Jerand Bradley 15-yard pass from Tyler Shough (pass failed). Red Raiders 33–27. Drive: 5 plays, 25 yards.
- WYO – John-Michael Gyllenborg 11-yard pass from Andrew Peasley (Sam Scott run). Cowboys 35–33. Drive: 6 plays, 25 yards.

Statistics	TTU	WYO
First downs	26	24
Total yards	431	320
Rushing yards	93	171
Passing yards	338	149
Turnovers	1	2
Time of possession	25:58	34:02

Team	Category	Player	Statistics
Texas Tech	Passing	Tyler Shough	31/47, 338 yards, 3 TD, INT
Texas Tech	Rushing	Tahj Brooks	11 rushes, 39 yards, TD
Texas Tech	Receiving	Jerand Bradley	8 receptions, 88 yards, TD
Wyoming	Passing	Andrew Peasley	18/34, 149 yards, 2 TD
Wyoming	Rushing	Andrew Peasley	15 rushes, 68 yards, TD
Wyoming	Receiving	John Michael Gyllenborg	5 receptions, 37 yards, TD

=== No. 13 Oregon ===
No. 13 Oregon Ducks at Texas Tech Red Raiders – Game summary

Quarter	1	2	3	4	Total
No. 13 Ducks	15	3	0	20	38
Red Raiders	7	6	14	3	30

at Jones AT&T Stadium, Lubbock, Texas

- Date: September 9
- Game time: 6:00 p.m. CDT
- Game weather: Sunny, 96 °F (36 °C)
- Game attendance: 56,200
- Referee: Mike McCabe
- TV announcers (Fox): Mark Followill and Mark Helfrich
- Box score, Recap

Game information
First quarter
- TTU – Myles Price 18-yard pass from Tyler Shough (Gino Garcia kick), 9:37. Red Raiders 7–0. Drive: 6 plays, 85 yards, 2:30.
- ORE – Troy Franklin 72-yard pass from Bo Nix (Camden Lewis kick), 8:58. Tied 7–7. Drive: 2 plays, 75 yards, 0:39.
- ORE – Tez Johnson 13-yard pass from Bo Nix (Patrick Herbert pass to Terrance Ferguson), 3:45. Ducks 15–7. Drive: 7 plays, 60 yards, 3:56.

Second quarter

- TTU – Mason Tharp 7-yard pass from Tyler Shough (pass failed), 13:01. Ducks 15–13. Drive: 15 plays, 75 yards, 5:44.
- ORE – Camden Lewis 28-yard field goal, 0:59. Ducks 18–13. Drive: 11 plays, 56 yards, 3:05.

Third quarter

- TTU – Tyler Shough 5-yard run (Gino Garcia kick), 12:58. Red Raiders 20–18. Drive: 5 plays, 75 yards, 2:02.
- TTU – Jerand Bradley 34-yard pass from Tyler Shough (Gino Garcia kick), 6:16. Red Raiders 27–18. Drive: 3 plays, 83 yards, 1:04.

Fourth quarter

- ORE – Bucky Irving 3-yard run (Camden Lewis kick), 14:47. Red Raiders 27–25. Drive: 17 plays, 75 yards, 6:29.
- ORE – Camden Lewis 23-yard field goal, 10:27. Ducks 28–27. Drive: 6 plays, 28 yards, 2:32.
- TTU – Gino Garcia 45-yard field goal, 5:13. Red Raiders 30–28. Drive: 12 plays, 48 yards, 5:14.
- ORE – Camden Lewis 34-yard field goal, 1:10. Ducks 31–30. Drive: 10 plays, 64 yards, 4:03.
- ORE – Jeffrey Bassa 45-yard interception return (Camden Lewis kick), 0:35. Ducks 38–30.

Statistics	ORE	TTU
First downs	21	27
Total yards	472	456
Rushing yards	113	174
Passing yards	359	282
Turnovers	0	4
Time of possession	32:15	27:45

Team	Category	Player	Statistics
Oregon	Passing	Bo Nix	32/44, 359 yards, 2 TD
Oregon	Rushing	Bo Nix	9 rushes, 46 yards
Oregon	Receiving	Troy Franklin	6 receptions, 103 yards, TD
Texas Tech	Passing	Tyler Shough	24/38, 282 yards, 3 TD, 3 INT
Texas Tech	Rushing	Tyler Shough	23 rushes, 101 yards, TD
Texas Tech	Receiving	Jerand Bradley	5 receptions, 83 yards, TD

=== Tarleton State ===
Tarleton State Texans at Texas Tech Red Raiders – Game summary

Quarter	1	2	3	4	Total
Texans	0	0	0	3	3
Red Raiders	21	3	10	7	41

at Jones AT&T Stadium, Lubbock, Texas

- Date: September 16
- Game time: 6:00 p.m. CDT
- Game weather: Sunny, 78 °F (26 °C)
- Game attendance: 56,200
- Referee: Kevin Randall
- TV announcers (ESPN+): Noah Reed, Ryan Leaf, and Tori Petry
- Box score, Recap

Game information
First quarter
- TTU – Malik Dunlap 54-yard interception return (Gino Garcia kick), 12:33. Red Raiders 7–0.
- TTU – Tyler Shough 2-yard run (Gino Garcia kick), 8:19. Red Raiders 14–0. Drive: 7 plays, 64 yards, 2:52.
- TTU – Mason Tharp 28-yard pass from Tyler Shough (Gino Garcia kick), 4:36. Red Raiders 21–0. Drive: 7 plays, 68 yards, 1:59.

Second quarter

- TTU – Gino Garcia 28-yard field goal, 3:17. Red Raiders 24–0. Drive: 13 plays, 58 yards, 6:05.

Third quarter

- TTU – Gino Garcia 43-yard field goal, 8:35. Red Raiders 27–0. Drive: 4 plays, 2 yards, 1:39.
- TTU – Myles Price 15-yard pass from Behren Morton (Gino Garcia kick), 3:50. Red Raiders 34–0. Drive: 4 plays, 47 yards, 1:05.

Fourth quarter

- TTU – Jordan Brown 5-yard pass from Behren Morton (Gino Garcia kick), 10:23. Red Raiders 41–0. Drive: 14 plays, 85 yards, 5:30.
- TAR – Adrian Guzman 21-yard field goal, 5:04. Red Raiders 41–3. Drive: 13 plays, 71 yards, 5:19.

Statistics	TSU	TTU
First downs	19	26
Total yards	342	416
Rushing yards	145	221
Passing yards	197	195
Turnovers	3	1
Time of possession	32:31	27:29

Team	Category	Player	Statistics
Tarleton State	Passing	Victor Gabalis	21/40, 182 yards, 3 INT
Tarleton State	Rushing	Caleb Lewis	11 rushes, 67 yards
Tarleton State	Receiving	Benjamin Omayebu	12 receptions, 76 yards
Texas Tech	Passing	Tyler Shough	10/20, 123 yards, TD
Texas Tech	Rushing	Tahj Brooks	19 rushes, 158 yards
Texas Tech	Receiving	Jordan Brown	6 receptions, 73 yards, TD

=== At West Virginia ===
Texas Tech Red Raiders at West Virginia Mountaineers – Game summary

Quarter	1	2	3	4	Total
Red Raiders	3	0	0	10	13
Mountaineers	7	6	0	7	20

at Milan Puskar Stadium, Morgantown, West Virginia

- Date: September 23
- Game time: 2:30 p.m. CDT/3:30 p.m. EDT
- Game weather: Cloudy, 56 °F (13 °C), N 12 miles per hour (19 km/h)
- Game attendance: 50,071
- Referee: Kevin Boitmann
- TV announcers (ESPN+): Drew Carter, Dustin Fox, and Tori Petry
- Box score, Recap

Game information
First quarter
- TTU – Gino Garcia 39-yard field goal, 8:40. Red Raiders 3–0. Drive: 6 plays, 14 yards, 1:54.
- WVU – CJ Donaldson Jr. 2-yard run (Michael Hayes kick), 1:53. Mountaineers 7–3. Drive: 13 plays, 75 yards, 6:47.

Second quarter

- WVU – Michael Hayes 28-yard field goal, 6:34. Mountaineers 10–3. Drive: 12 plays, 56 yards, 6:08.
- WVU – Michael Hayes 46-yard field goal, 0:25. Mountaineers 13–3. Drive: 6 plays, 26 yards, 2:58.

Third quarter

- No scoring plays

Fourth quarter

- TTU – Jerand Bradley 6-yard pass from Behren Morton (Gino Garcia kick), 11:54. Mountaineers 13–10. Drive: 13 plays, 79 yards, 4:42.
- WVU – Kole Taylor 9-yard pass from Nicco Marchiol (Michael Hayes kick), 7:33. Mountaineers 20–10. Drive: 7 plays, 79 yards, 4:16.
- TTU – Gino Garcia 34-yard field goal, 4:45. Mountaineers 20–13. Drive: 14 plays, 59 yards, 2:40.

Statistics	TTU	WVU
First downs	18	16
Total yards	321	256
Rushing yards	160	157
Passing yards	161	99
Turnovers	0	2
Time of possession	25:10	34:50

Team	Category	Player	Statistics
Texas Tech	Passing	Behren Morton	13/37, 158 yards, TD
Texas Tech	Rushing	Tahj Brooks	25 rushes, 149 yards
Texas Tech	Receiving	Xavier White	3 receptions, 45 yards
West Virginia	Passing	Nicco Marchiol	12/21, 78 yards, TD, 2 INT
West Virginia	Rushing	Nicco Marchiol	15 rushes, 72 yards
West Virginia	Receiving	Kole Taylor	3 receptions, 39 yards, TD

Tyler Shough was carted off the field in the 1st quarter after he appeared to have rolled his ankle on back-to-back plays. It was later revealed that Shough had a broken fibula in his left leg; Shough had surgery the following Tuesday and is expected to be out six to eight weeks.

=== Houston ===
Houston Cougars at Texas Tech Red Raiders – Game summary

Quarter	1	2	3	4	Total
Cougars	14	14	0	0	28
Red Raiders	14	21	7	7	49

at Jones AT&T Stadium, Lubbock, Texas

- Date: September 30
- Game time: 2:30 p.m. CDT
- Game weather: Sunny, 85 °F (29 °C)
- Game attendance: 53,308
- Referee: David Alvarez
- TV announcers (FS2): Dan Hellie and Petros Papadakis
- Box score, Recap

Game information
First quarter
- HOU – Bryan Henry 6-yard pass from Donovan Smith (Jack Martin kick), 8:40. Cougars 7–0. Drive: 12 plays, 75 yards, 6:20.
- TTU – Drae McCray 100-yard kickoff return (Gino Garcia kick), 8:25. Tied 7–7.
- HOU – Samuel Brown 16-yard pass from Donovan Smith (Jack Martin kick), 6:15. Cougars 14–7. Drive: 6 plays, 75 yards, 2:10.
- TTU – Tahj Brooks 7-yard run (Gino Garcia kick), 1:25. Tied 14–14. Drive: 12 plays, 74 yards, 4:50.

Second quarter

- HOU – Joseph Manjack IV 49-yard pass from Donovan Smith (Jack Martin kick), 13:45. Cougars 21–14. Drive: 5 plays, 75 yards, 2:40.
- TTU – Loic Fouonji 25-yard pass from Behren Morton (Gino Garcia kick), 8:47. Tied 21–21. Drive: 13 plays, 75 yards, 4:58.
- TTU – Loic Fouonji 7-yard blocked punt return (Gino Garcia kick), 7:18. Red Raiders 28–21.
- HOU – Dalton Carnes 41-yard pass from Donovan Smith (Jack Martin kick), 2:16. Tied 28–28. Drive: 9 plays, 75 yards, 5:02.
- TTU – Tahj Brooks 1-yard run (Gino Garcia kick), 0:44. Red Raiders 35–28. Drive: 8 plays, 75 yards, 1:32.

Third quarter

- TTU – Myles Price 11-yard pass from Behren Morton (Gino Garcia kick), 9:22. Red Raiders 42–28. Drive: 3 plays, 80 yards, 0:48.

Fourth quarter

- TTU – Cam'Ron Valdez 41-yard run (Gino Garcia kick), 8:47. Red Raiders 49–28. Drive: 5 plays, 55 yards, 3:07.

Statistics	HOU	TTU
First downs	26	21
Total yards	489	400
Rushing yards	153	239
Passing yards	336	161
Turnovers	0	0
Time of possession	35:11	24:49

Team	Category	Player	Statistics
Houston	Passing	Donovan Smith	30/41, 336 yards, 4 TD
Houston	Rushing	Parker Jenkins	13 rushes, 71 yards
Houston	Receiving	Samuel Brown	10 receptions, 113 yards, TD
Texas Tech	Passing	Behren Morton	14/22, 161 yards, 2 TD
Texas Tech	Rushing	Cam'Ron Valdez	6 rushes, 111 yards, TD
Texas Tech	Receiving	Myles Price	5 receptions, 63 yards, TD

The Red Raiders scored two special teams touchdowns, with Drae McCray returning a kickoff for 100 yards and Loic Fouonji blocking a punt and returning it for a touchdown. Running back Tahj Brooks finished with over 100 rushing yards for the third straight game, becoming the first Texas Tech running back since DeAndré Washington in 2015 to do so.

=== At Baylor ===
Texas Tech Red Raiders at Baylor Bears – Game summary

Quarter	1	2	3	4	Total
Red Raiders	7	10	7	15	39
Bears	0	3	0	11	14

at McLane Stadium, Waco, Texas

- Date: October 7
- Game time: 7:00 p.m. CDT
- Game weather: Clear, 66 °F (19 °C)
- Game attendance: 44,620
- Referee: Michael VanderVelde
- TV announcers (ESPN2): Brian Custer, Rod Gilmore, and Lauren Sisler
- Box score, Recap

Game information
First quarter
- TTU – Coy Eakin 13-yard pass from Behren Morton (Gino Garcia kick), 9:46. Red Raiders 7–0. Drive: 11 plays, 75 yards, 5:14.

Second quarter

- TTU – Baylor Cupp 16-yard pass from Behren Morton (Gino Garcia kick), 13:06. Red Raiders 14–0. Drive: 7 plays, 59 yards, 3:01.
- BAY – Isaiah Hankins 33-yard field goal, 9:32. Red Raiders 14–3. Drive: 5 plays, 42 yards, 1:53.
- TTU – Gino Garcia 37-yard field goal, 0:09. Red Raiders 17–3. Drive 4 plays, 7 yards, 1:08.

Third quarter

- TTU – Baylor Cupp 18-yard pass from Behren Morton (Gino Garcia kick), 0:38. Red Raiders 24–3. Drive: 13 plays, 85 yards, 6:24.

Fourth quarter

- BAY – Monaray Baldwin 71-yard pass from Blake Shapen (Blake Shapen pass to Ketron Jackson Jr.), 13:34. Red Raiders 24–11. Drive: 6 plays, 76 yards, 2:04.
- TTU – Tahj Brooks 18-yard run (Tahj Brooks run), 9:15. Red Raiders 32–11. Drive: 9 plays, 65 yards, 4:19.
- BAY – Isaiah Hankins 33-yard field goal, 6:35. Red Raiders 32–14. Drive: 6 plays, 59 yards, 2:40.
- TTU – Behren Morton 10-yard run (Gino Garcia kick), 3:38. Red Raiders 39–14. Drive: 3 plays, 14 yards, 0:23.

Statistics	TTU	BAY
First downs	19	17
Total yards	366	341
Rushing yards	186	17
Passing yards	180	324
Turnovers	2	1
Time of possession	30:04	29:56

Team	Category	Player	Statistics
Texas Tech	Passing	Behren Morton	19/26, 180 yards, 3 TD, INT
Texas Tech	Rushing	Tahj Brooks	31 rushes, 170 yards, TD
Texas Tech	Receiving	Myles Price	10 receptions, 90 yards
Baylor	Passing	Blake Shapen	22/38, 324 yards, TD
Baylor	Rushing	Dominic Richardson	9 rushes, 21 yards
Baylor	Receiving	Monaray Baldwin	5 receptions, 126 yards, TD

Texas Tech quarterback Behren Morton threw for a career-high three touchdown passes while rushing for another. Running back Tahj Brooks finished with 100 rushing yards for the fourth game in a row, becoming the first Texas Tech running back to do so in the 21st century.

=== Kansas State ===
Kansas State Wildcats at Texas Tech Red Raiders – Game summary

Quarter	1	2	3	4	Total
Wildcats	10	7	14	7	38
Red Raiders	0	14	7	0	21

at Jones AT&T Stadium, Lubbock, Texas

- Date: October 14
- Game time: 6:00 p.m. CDT
- Game weather: Sunny
- Game attendance: 56,200
- Referee: Derek Anderson
- TV announcers (FS1): Alex Faust and Petros Papadakis
- Box score, Recap

Game information
First quarter
- KSU – Chris Tennant 47-yard field goal, 11:28. Wildcats 3–0. Drive: 8 plays, 50 yards, 3:32.
- KSU – Avery Johnson 2-yard run (Chris Tennant kick), 2:54. Wildcats 10–0. Drive: 5 plays, 59 yards, 2:15.

Second quarter

- TTU – Behren Morton 1-yard run (Gino Garcia kick), 11:53. Wildcats 10–7. Drive: 14 plays, 75 yards, 6:01.
- KSU – Avery Johnson 5-yard run (Chris Tennant kick), 1:20. Wildcats 17–7. Drive: 7 plays, 80 yards, 2:44.
- TTU – Tahj Brooks 2-yard run (Gino Garcia kick), 0:23. Wildcats 17–14. Drive: 7 plays, 89 yards, 0:54.

Third quarter

- TTU – Jerand Bradley 8-yard pass from Jake Strong (Gino Garcia kick), 7:31. Red Raiders 21–17. Drive: 10 plays, 99 yards, 4:04.
- KSU – Avery Johnson 30-yard run (Chris Tennant kick), 2:24. Wildcats 24–21. Drive: 9 plays, 75 yards, 5:07.
- KSU – Avery Johnson 11-yard run (Chris Tennant kick), 2:06. Wildcats 31–21. Drive: 1 play, 11 yards, 0:04.

Fourth quarter

- KSU – Avery Johnson 3-yard run (Chris Tennant kick), 4:58. Wildcats 38–21. Drive: 10 plays, 80 yards, 5:59.

Statistics	KSU	TTU
First downs	24	23
Total yards	435	480
Rushing yards	272	182
Passing yards	163	298
Turnovers	0	3
Time of possession	32:45	27:15

Team	Category	Player	Statistics
Kansas State	Passing	Will Howard	6/9, 86 yards
Kansas State	Rushing	Treshaun Ward	15 rushes, 118 yards
Kansas State	Receiving	Ben Sinnott	6 receptions, 72 yards
Texas Tech	Passing	Jake Strong	16/28, 173 yards, TD, 3 INT
Texas Tech	Rushing	Tahj Brooks	17 rushes, 98 yards, TD
Texas Tech	Receiving	Coy Eakin	5 receptions, 102 yards

Starting quarterback Behren Morton exited the game at halftime with an undisclosed injury. Morton had been dealing with a sprained AC joint in his throwing shoulder ever since he took over for the injured Tyler Shough.

=== At BYU ===
Texas Tech Red Raiders at BYU Cougars – Game summary

Quarter	1	2	3	4	Total
Red Raiders	0	7	0	7	14
Cougars	14	10	3	0	27

at LaVell Edwards Stadium, Provo, Utah

- Date: October 21
- Game time: 6:00 p.m. CDT/5:00 p.m. MDT
- Game weather: Sunny, 73 °F (23 °C)
- Game attendance: 63,523
- Referee: Tutashinda Salaam
- TV announcers (FS1): Alex Faust and Petros Papadakis
- Box score, Recap

Game information
First quarter
- BYU – Chase Roberts 3-yard pass from Kedon Slovis (Will Ferrin kick), 11:34. Cougars 7–0. Drive: 7 plays, 75 yards, 3:26.
- BYU – Eddie Heckard 5-yard fumble return (Will Ferrin kick), 2:10. Cougars 14–0.

Second quarter

- TTU – Xavier White 72-yard pass from Jake Strong (Gino Garcia kick), 9:19. Cougars 14–7. Drive: 4 plays, 66 yards, 1:13.
- BYU – Darius Lassiter 4-yard pass from Kedon Slovis (Will Ferrin kick), 6:11. Cougars 21–7. Drive: 7 plays, 81 yards, 3:03.

Third quarter

- BYU – Will Ferrin 41-yard field goal, 1:19. Cougars 27–7. Drive: 6 plays, 20 yards, 2:50.

Fourth quarter

- TTU – Tahj Brooks 1-yard run (Gino Garcia kick), 8:41. Cougars 27–14. Drive: 14 plays, 87 yards, 4:45.

Statistics	TTU	BYU
First downs	19	12
Total yards	389	277
Rushing yards	153	150
Passing yards	236	127
Turnovers	5	0
Time of possession	30:55	29:05

Team	Category	Player	Statistics
Texas Tech	Passing	Jake Strong	19/37, 236 yards, TD, 3 INT
Texas Tech	Rushing	Tahj Brooks	30 rushes, 101 yards, TD
Texas Tech	Receiving	Xavier White	3 receptions, 98 yards, TD
BYU	Passing	Kedon Slovis	15/27, 127 yards, 2 TD
BYU	Rushing	LJ Martin	10 rushes, 93 yards
BYU	Receiving	Darius Lassiter	4 receptions, 47 yards, TD

=== TCU ===
TCU Horned Frogs at Texas Tech Red Raiders – Game summary

Quarter	1	2	3	4	Total
Horned Frogs	7	0	14	7	28
Red Raiders	7	13	8	7	35

at Jones AT&T Stadium, Lubbock, Texas

- Date: November 2
- Game time: 6:00 p.m. CDT
- Game weather: Sunny, 64 °F (18 °C)
- Game attendance: 51,185
- Referee: Michael VanderVelde
- TV announcers (FS1): Jeff Levering and Mark Helfrich
- Box score, Recap

Game information
First quarter
- TTU – Behren Morton 9-yard run (Gino Garcia kick), 6:12. Red Raiders 7–0. Drive: 14 plays, 81 yards, 5:43.
- TCU – D. J. Rogers 17-yard pass from Josh Hoover (Griffin Kell kick), 4:13. Tied 7–7. Drive: 7 plays, 75 yards, 1:59.

Second quarter

- TTU – Gino Garcia 27-yard field goal, 12:32. Red Raiders 10–7. Drive: 14 plays, 66 yards, 6:41.
- TTU – Myles Price 25-yard pass from Behren Morton (Gino Garcia kick), 3:46. Red Raiders 17–7. Drive: 12 plays, 75 yards, 5:35.
- TTU – Gino Garcia 55-yard field goal, 0:53. Red Raiders 20–7. Drive: 5 plays, 22 yards, 1:19.

Third quarter

- TCU – Emani Bailey 16-yard run (Griffin Kell kick), 8:08. Red Raiders 20–14. Drive: 10 plays, 93 yards, 3:51.
- TCU – Emani Bailey 2-yard run (Griffin Kell kick), 4:47. Horned Frogs 21–20. Drive: 5 plays, 34 yards, 1:50.
- TTU – Tahj Brooks 9-yard run (Behren Morton pass to Jerand Bradley), 0:06. Red Raiders 28–21. Drive: 2 plays, 16 yards, 0:34.

Fourth quarter

- TTU – Drae McCray 44-yard pass from Behren Morton (Gino Garcia kick), 10:33. Red Raiders 35–21. Drive: 3 plays, 92 yards, 1:13.
- TCU – Trey Sanders 1-yard run (Griffin Kell kick), 4:54. Red Raiders 35–28. Drive: 16 plays, 75 yards, 5:39.

Statistics	TCU	TTU
First downs	26	22
Total yards	440	428
Rushing yards	87	146
Passing yards	353	282
Turnovers	2	0
Time of possession	25:35	34:25

Team	Category	Player	Statistics
TCU	Passing	Josh Hoover	32/52, 353 yards, TD, 2 INT
TCU	Rushing	Emani Bailey	19 rushes, 57 yards, 2 TD
TCU	Receiving	Jaylon Robinson	5 receptions, 68 yards
Texas Tech	Passing	Behren Morton	28/36, 282 yards, 2 TD
Texas Tech	Rushing	Tahj Brooks	31 rushes, 146 yards, TD
Texas Tech	Receiving	Coy Eakin	8 receptions, 78 yards

A possum ran onto the field early in the second quarter, quickly becoming a viral sensation and spawning numerous Internet memes. The animal was captured by stadium officials and was petted by university president Lawrence Schovanec after the game before being released back into the wild.

=== At No. 16 Kansas ===
Texas Tech Red Raiders at No. 16 Kansas Jayhawks – Game summary

Quarter	1	2	3	4	Total
Red Raiders	10	0	3	3	16
No. 16 Jayhawks	0	0	0	13	13

at David Booth Kansas Memorial Stadium, Lawrence, Kansas

- Date: November 11
- Game time: 11:00 a.m. CST
- Game weather: Cloudy, 53 °F (12 °C)
- Game attendance: 47,233
- Referee: Derek Anderson
- TV announcers (FS1): Eric Collins and Devin Gardner
- Box score, Recap

Game information
First quarter
- TTU – Tahj Brooks 5-yard run (Gino Garcia kick), 10:18. Red Raiders 7–0. Drive: 7 plays, 50 yards, 2:54.
- TTU – Gino Garcia 32-yard field goal, 3:24. Red Raiders 10–0. Drive: 15 plays, 42 yards, 5:22.

Second quarter

- No scoring plays

Third quarter

- TTU – Gino Garcia 31-yard field goal, 2:56. Red Raiders 13–0. Drive: 8 plays, 22 yards, 3:42.

Fourth quarter

- KU – Devin Neal 60-yard run (Seth Keller kick), 12:12. Red Raiders 13–7. Drive: 4 plays, 70 yards, 1:42.
- KU – Seth Keller 24-yard field goal, 4:42. Red Raiders 13–10. Drive: 11 plays, 71 yards, 4:57.
- KU – Seth Keller 22-yard field goal, 0:25. Tied 13–13. Drive: 14 plays, 77 yards, 1:55.
- TTU – Gino Garcia 30-yard field goal, 0:00. Red Raiders 16–13. Drive: 4 plays, 63 yards, 0:25.

Statistics	TTU	KU
First downs	21	18
Total yards	312	344
Rushing yards	136	207
Passing yards	176	137
Turnovers	1	1
Time of possession	31:20	28:40

Team	Category	Player	Statistics
Texas Tech	Passing	Behren Morton	19/25, 176 yards, INT
Texas Tech	Rushing	Tahj Brooks	33 rushes, 133 yards, TD
Texas Tech	Receiving	Jerand Bradley	4 receptions, 91 yards
Kansas	Passing	Cole Ballard	9/20, 124 yards, INT
Kansas	Rushing	Devin Neal	19 rushes, 137 yards, TD
Kansas	Receiving	Lawrence Arnold	2 receptions, 44 yards

=== UCF ===
UCF Knights at Texas Tech Red Raiders – Game summary

Quarter	1	2	3	4	Total
Knights	14	0	0	9	23
Red Raiders	0	14	7	3	24

at Jones AT&T Stadium, Lubbock, Texas

- Date: November 18
- Game time: 4:30 p.m. CST
- Game weather: Sunny
- Game attendance: 53,851
- Referee: Tutashinda Salaam
- TV announcers (FS2): Guy Haberman and Charles Arbuckle
- Box score, Recap

Game information
First quarter
- UCF – R. J. Harvey 4-yard run (Colton Boomer kick), 11:49. Knights 7–0. Drive: 8 plays, 75 yards, 3:11.
- UCF – R. J. Harvey 1-yard run (Colton Boomer kick), 0:11. Knights 14–0. Drive: 11 plays, 70 yards, 5:16.

Second quarter

- TTU – Drae McCray 15-yard pass from Behren Morton (Gino Garcia kick), 13:10. Knights 14–7. Drive: 6 plays, 46 yards, 2:01.
- TTU – Mason Tharp 19-yard pass from Behren Morton (Gino Garcia kick), 3:13. Tied 14–14. Drive: 8 plays, 93 yards, 4:05.

Third quarter

- TTU – Tahj Brooks 13-yard run (Gino Garcia kick), 0:11. Red Raiders 21–14. Drive: 5 plays, 41 yards, 1:16.

Fourth quarter

- UCF – Colton Boomer 24-yard field goal, 10:21. Red Raiders 21–17. Drive: 11 plays, 68 yards, 4:50.
- TTU – Gino Garcia 51-yard field goal, 6:13. Red Raiders 24–17. Drive: 9 plays, 42 yards, 4:08.
- UCF – Javon Baker 71-yard pass from John Rhys Plumlee (kick blocked), 5:30. Red Raiders 24–23. Drive: 2 plays, 75 yards, 0:43.

Statistics	UCF	TTU
First downs	23	25
Total yards	486	446
Rushing yards	238	190
Passing yards	248	256
Turnovers	1	1
Time of possession	31:57	28:03

Team	Category	Player	Statistics
UCF	Passing	John Rhys Plumlee	16/32, 248 yards, TD, INT
UCF	Rushing	John Rhys Plumlee	13 rushes, 84 yards
UCF	Receiving	Javon Baker	4 receptions, 117 yards, TD
Texas Tech	Passing	Behren Morton	21/34, 256 yards, 2 TD, INT
Texas Tech	Rushing	Tahj Brooks	24 rushes, 182 yards, TD
Texas Tech	Receiving	Xavier White	3 receptions, 77 yards

=== At No. 7 Texas ===
Texas Tech Red Raiders at No. 7 Texas Longhorns – Game summary

Quarter	1	2	3	4	Total
Red Raiders	7	0	0	0	7
No. 7 Longhorns	10	16	24	7	57

at Darrell K Royal–Texas Memorial Stadium, Austin, Texas

- Date: November 24
- Game time: 6:30 p.m. CST
- Game weather: Sunny • Temperature: 62 °F (17 °C)
- Game attendance: 102,452
- Referee: Kevin Mar
- TV announcers (ABC): Dave Pasch, Dusty Dvoracek, and Tom Luginbill
- Box score, Recap

Game information
First quarter
- TEX – Keilan Robinson 10-yard run (Bert Auburn kick), 10:29. Longhorns 7–0. Drive: 7 plays, 56 yards, 3:37.
- TEX – Bert Auburn 34-yard field goal, 2:15. Longhorns 10–0. Drive: 5 plays, 27 yards, 1:21.
- TTU – Behren Morton 2-yard run (Gino Garcia kick), 0:29. Longhorns 10–7. Drive: 4 plays, 44 yards, 1:46.

Second quarter

- TEX – Jaydon Blue 69-yard run (Bert Auburn kick), 14:50. Longhorns 17–7. Drive: 2 plays, 74 yards, 0:39.
- TEX – Bert Auburn 37-yard field goal, 10:07. Longhorns 20–7. Drive: 4 plays, 1 yard, 0:56.
- TEX – Bert Auburn 26-yard field goal, 2:44. Longhorns 23–7. Drive: 7 plays, 33 yards, 2:29.
- TEX – Bert Auburn 44-yard field goal, 0:00. Longhorns 26–7. Drive: 5 plays, 19 yards, 0:26.

Third quarter

- TEX – Keilan Robinson 95-yard kickoff return (Bert Auburn kick), 14:46. Longhorns 33–7.
- TEX – Bert Auburn 54-yard field goal, 9:15. Longhorns 36–7. Drive: 6 plays, 6 yards, 2:13.
- TEX – Xavier Worthy 19-yard pass from Quinn Ewers (Bert Auburn kick), 4:44. Longhorns 43–7. Drive: 6 plays, 62 yards, 2:36.
- TEX – Jett Bush 43-yard interception return (Bert Auburn kick), 3:26. Longhorns 50–7.

Fourth quarter

- TEX – Quintrevion Wisner 10-yard run (Bert Auburn kick), 0:38. Longhorns 57–7. Drive: 13 plays, 91 yards, 7:59.

Statistics	TTU	TEX
First downs	14	27
Total yards	198	528
Rushing yards	110	302
Passing yards	88	226
Turnovers	3	1
Time of possession	27:00	33:00

Team	Category	Player	Statistics
Texas Tech	Passing	Behren Morton	19/36, 88 yards, 3 INT
Texas Tech	Rushing	Tahj Brooks	19 rushes, 95 yards
Texas Tech	Receiving	Coy Eakin	4 receptions, 27 yards
Texas	Passing	Quinn Ewers	17/26, 196 yards, TD, INT
Texas	Rushing	Jaydon Blue	10 rushes, 121 yards, TD
Texas	Receiving	Xavier Worthy	4 receptions, 49 yards, TD

=== Vs. California (Independence Bowl) ===
2023 Independence Bowl
California Golden Bears vs. Texas Tech Red Raiders – Game summary

Quarter	1	2	3	4	Total
Golden Bears	14	0	0	0	14
Red Raiders	7	17	7	3	34

at Independence Stadium, Shreveport, Louisiana

- Date: December 16
- Game time: 8:15 p.m. CST
- Game weather: Clear, 45 °F (7 °C)
- Game attendance: 33,071
- Referee: Jerry Magallanes
- TV announcers (ESPN): Kevin Connors, Rocky Boiman, and Marilyn Payne
- Box score, Recap

Game information
First quarter
- CAL – Monroe Young 25-yard pass from Fernando Mendoza (Mateen Bhaghani kick), 14:45. Golden Bears 7–0. Drive: 1 play, 25 yards, 0:15.
- TTU – Coy Eakin 27-yard pass from Behren Morton (Gino Garcia kick), 4:19. Tied 7–7. Drive: 10 plays, 93 yards, 4:11.
- CAL – Jaydn Ott 1-yard run (Mateen Bhaghani kick), 2:38. Golden Bears 14–7. Drive: 5 plays, 74 yards, 1:41.

Second quarter

- TTU – Mason Tharp 15-yard pass from Behren Morton (Gino Garcia kick), 12:16. Tied 14–14. Drive: 11 plays, 65 yards, 5:22.
- TTU – Loic Fouonji 14-yard pass from Behren Morton (Gino Garcia kick), 9:49. Red Raiders 21–14. Drive: 5 plays, 59 yards, 1:42.
- TTU – Gino Garcia 25-yard field goal, 0:03. Red Raiders 24–14. Drive: 9 plays, 47 yards, 2:17.

Third quarter

- TTU – Tahj Brooks 7-yard run (Gino Garcia kick), 4:36. Red Raiders 31–14. Drive: 2 plays, 15 yards, 0:49.

Fourth quarter

- TTU – Gino Garcia 37-yard field goal, 4:08. Red Raiders 34–14. Drive: 4 plays, 1 yard, 1:44.

Statistics	CAL	TTU
First downs	15	24
Total yards	333	383
Rushing yards	73	125
Passing yards	261	259
Turnovers	4	2
Time of possession	26:28	33:32

Team	Category	Player	Statistics
California	Passing	Fernando Mendoza	22/33, 261 yards, TD, 3 INT
California	Rushing	Jaydn Ott	17 rushes, 55 yards, TD
California	Receiving	Trond Grizzell	4 receptions, 80 yards
Texas Tech	Passing	Behren Morton	27/43, 259 yards, 3 TD, INT
Texas Tech	Rushing	Tahj Brooks	22 rushes, 95 yards, TD
Texas Tech	Receiving	Coy Eakin	7 receptions, 106 yards, TD

== Rankings ==
Ranking movements Legend: ██ Increase in ranking ██ Decrease in ranking — = Not ranked RV = Received votes
	Week															
Poll	Pre	1	2	3	4	5	6	7	8	9	10	11	12	13	14	Final
AP	RV	RV	—	—	—	—	—	—	—	—	—	—	—	—	—	—
Coaches	24	RV	—	—	—	—	—	—	—	—	—	—	—	—	—	—
CFP	Not released									—	—	—	—	—	—	Not released
