= 2023 Independence Bowl =

Postseason college football bowl game

2023 Radiance Technologies Independence Bowl
- 47th Independence Bowl
California Golden Bears	Texas Tech Red Raiders
(6–6)	(6–6)
Pac-12	Big 12
14	34
Head coach: Justin Wilcox	Head coach: Joey McGuire
	1	2	3	4	Total
California	14	0	0	0	14
Texas Tech	7	17	7	3	34
- Date: December 16, 2023
- Season: 2023
- Stadium: Independence Stadium
- Location: Shreveport, Louisiana
- MVP: Behren Morton (QB, Texas Tech) & Jacob Rodriguez (LB, Texas Tech)
- Favorite: Texas Tech by 2.5
- Referee: Jerry Magallanes (ACC)
- Attendance: 33,071

United States TV coverage
- Network: ESPN
- Announcers: Kevin Connors (play-by-play), Rocky Boiman (analyst), and Marilyn Payne (sideline)

The 2023 Independence Bowl was a college football bowl game played on December 16, 2023, at Independence Stadium in Shreveport, Louisiana. The 47th annual Independence Bowl game featured the Texas Tech Red Raiders from the Big 12 Conference and the California Golden Bears from the Pac-12 Conference. The game began at approximately 8:15 p.m. CST and was aired on ESPN. The Independence Bowl was one of the 2023–24 bowl games concluding 2023 FBS football season. The bowl game was sponsored by engineering services company Radiance Technologies and was officially known as the Radiance Technologies Independence Bowl.

== Teams ==
Based on conference tie-ins, the game featured the California Golden Bears of the Pac-12 Conference and the Texas Tech Red Raiders of the Big 12 Conference.

This was the second meeting between California and Texas Tech. The Red Raiders won their only previous meeting, defeating the Golden Bears, 45–31, in the 2004 Holiday Bowl.

=== California ===
This was California's first Independence Bowl. It was also the Golden Bears' final game as a member of the Pac-12, as they committed to join the Atlantic Coast Conference for the 2024 season.

Cal opened their 2023 season by winning three of their first five games, with the losses coming to Auburn and Washington. However, Cal lost each of their subsequent four games, all to ranked Pac-12 foes. This caused them to fall to a record of 3–6, which meant that they would be eliminated from bowl contention with any further losses. However, the Golden Bears managed to win each of their final three games, with running back Jaydn Ott rushing for over 400 yards in the three wins. This allowed them to clinch bowl eligibility in the final week of the season, with a record of 6–6.

=== Texas Tech ===
This was Texas Tech's third Independence Bowl. The Red Raiders were 0–2 in their previous appearances, having lost the 1986 edition and the 1998 edition, both to Ole Miss.

Texas Tech lost three of their first four games to open their 2023 campaign, with the sole victory coming against FCS Tarleton State. Combined with an injury to starting quarterback Tyler Shough, Texas Tech faced an uphill battle to clinch bowl eligibility. However, the Red Raiders rebounded by winning five of their next seven games in Big 12 play, with the last being a 24–23 victory over UCF to earn the team's sixth win and become bowl-eligible. Texas Tech closed their regular season with a 7–57 loss to Texas, and entered the Independence Bowl with a record of 6–6.

== Game summary ==
2023 Radiance Technologies Independence Bowl

Quarter	1	2	3	4	Total
California	14	0	0	0	14
Texas Tech	7	17	7	3	34

at Independence Stadium • Shreveport, Louisiana

- Date: Friday, December 16, 2023
- Game time: 8:15 p.m. CST
- Game weather: Clear • Temperature: 45 °F (7 °C) • Wind: 5 mph (8.0 km/h) NW
- Game attendance: 33,071
- Referee: Jerry Magallanes
- TV announcers (ESPN): Kevin Connors (play-by-play), Rocky Boiman (analyst), and Marilyn Payne (sideline)
- Box score

Game information
First quarter
- CAL – Monroe Young 25-yard pass from Fernando Mendoza (Mateen Bhaghani kick), 14:45. Golden Bears 7–0. Drive: 1 play, 25 yards, 0:15.
- TTU – Coy Eakin 27-yard pass from Behren Morton (Gino Garcia kick), 4:19. Tied 7–7. Drive: 10 plays, 93 yards, 4:11.
- CAL – Jaydn Ott 1-yard run (Mateen Bhaghani kick), 2:38. Golden Bears 14–7. Drive: 5 plays, 74 yards, 1:41.

Second quarter

- TTU – Mason Tharp 15-yard pass from Behren Morton (Gino Garcia kick), 12:16. Tied 14–14. Drive: 11 plays, 65 yards, 5:22.
- TTU – Loic Fouonji 14-yard pass from Behren Morton (Gino Garcia kick), 9:49. Red Raiders 21–14. Drive: 5 plays, 59 yards, 1:42.
- TTU – Gino Garcia 25-yard field goal, 0:03. Red Raiders 24–14. Drive: 9 plays, 47 yards, 2:17.

Third quarter

- TTU – Tahj Brooks 7-yard run (Gino Garcia kick), 4:36. Red Raiders 31–14. Drive: 2 plays, 15 yards, 0:49.

Fourth quarter

- TTU – Gino Garcia 37-yard field goal, 4:08. Red Raiders 34–14. Drive: 4 plays, 1 yard, 1:44.

=== Statistics ===
Statistics	CAL	TTU
First downs	15	24
Plays–yards	64–353	80–384
Rushes–yards	31–69	36–128
Passing yards	284	256
Passing: comp–att–int	22–33–3	27–44–1
Time of possession	26:25	31:02

Team	Category	Player	Statistics
California	Passing	Fernando Mendoza	22/33, 261 yards, TD, 3 INT
California	Rushing	Jaydn Ott	16 rushes, 45 yards, TD
California	Receiving	Trond Grizzell	4 receptions, 80 yards
Texas Tech	Passing	Behren Morton	27/43, 256 yards, 3 TD, INT
Texas Tech	Rushing	Tahj Brooks	22 rushes, 98 yards, TD
Texas Tech	Receiving	Coy Eakin	7 receptions, 106 yards, TD
