= Justin Wilcox (American football) =

American football player and coach (born 1976)

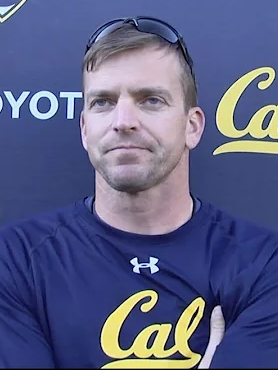
- Wilcox in 2017

Biographical details
- Born: November 12, 1976 (age 49); Eugene, Oregon, U.S.

Playing career
- 1996–1999: Oregon
- Position: Defensive back

Coaching career (HC unless noted)
- 2001–2002: Boise State (GA)
- 2003–2005: California (LB)
- 2006–2009: Boise State (DC)
- 2010–2011: Tennessee (DC)
- 2012–2013: Washington (DC)
- 2014–2015: USC (DC)
- 2016: Wisconsin (DC)
- 2017–2025: California

Head coaching record
- Overall: 48–55
- Bowls: 1–3

Accomplishments and honors

Awards
- Second-team All-Pac-10 (1999)

Justin Draper Wilcox (born November 12, 1976) is an American former college football coach and former player. He was the head football coach of the California Golden Bears from 2017 to 2025.

== Early life ==
Born in Eugene, Oregon, Wilcox grew up as the younger of two sons on a family farm (wheat and cherries) in nearby Junction City. He played quarterback at Junction City High School and led the team to the 3A state title as a junior in 1993. He graduated in 1995 and considered Stanford and Arizona but followed family tradition and accepted a scholarship to Oregon under head coach Mike Bellotti.

== Playing career ==
After redshirting his first year at Oregon, Wilcox found himself buried on the depth chart and switched to defensive back. A nickel back as a redshirt freshman, he lost most of the 1996 season to a knee injury. Wilcox became a fixture at safety until his senior season of 1999, when he was asked to fill a void at cornerback. He was invited to an NFL training camp with the Washington Redskins in 2000, but did not make the final roster. Wilcox graduated from Oregon in 1999 with a degree in anthropology.

== Coaching career ==
=== Assistant coaching career ===
Wilcox began his career as a college football coach in 2001 as a graduate assistant at Boise State, under new head coach Dan Hawkins. After two seasons as a graduate assistant, he left for the Bay Area to coach the linebackers at California under head coach Jeff Tedford. After three seasons at Cal, Wilcox returned to Boise State in 2006 as the defensive coordinator under new head coach Chris Petersen. In four years the teams lost only four games, with a 49–4 (.925) record, and his defenses were statistically among the highest-rated in the nation.

Following the 2009 season, Wilcox accepted the defensive coordinator job at Tennessee under new head coach Derek Dooley. In late December 2010, it was reported that Wilcox was a candidate to replace Will Muschamp, who left Texas for Florida. On New Year's Day, Wilcox announced that he would return to Tennessee for the 2011 season.

Early on January 2, 2012, reports emerged that Wilcox was to become the new defensive coordinator at Washington in Seattle, under head coach Steve Sarkisian. The position was vacant due to Nick Holt's termination days earlier, and the announcement was made official later that night. The Huskies were 7–6 in 2012 and lost in the Las Vegas Bowl. Washington was 9–4 in 2013 and won the Fight Hunger Bowl; Sarkisian left after the regular season for USC.

Wilcox followed Sarkisian to USC and was the defensive coordinator; the Trojans went 9–4 in 2014 and won the Holiday Bowl. After five games in 2015, Sarkisian was fired and succeeded by Clay Helton. The Trojans finished 50th nationally in scoring defense (25.7 points per game) and 65th in total defense (400.8 yards per game) in 2015, and Wilcox was terminated the day after the loss to Stanford in the Pac-12 championship game.

On January 28, 2016, Wilcox became the defensive coordinator at Wisconsin, under head coach Paul Chryst. The Badgers went 11–3 and won the Cotton Bowl with a defense ranked in the top ten in a number of categories.

=== California ===
On January 14, 2017, Wilcox was introduced as the 34th head coach of the California Golden Bears.

==== 2017 ====
The Bears went 5–7 during Wilcox's first year in 2017, with wins over North Carolina, Ole Miss, and #8 Washington State, and three losses by three points or fewer.

==== 2018 ====
2018 represented the first of two winning seasons Justin Wilcox has achieved to date as a head football coach. The Bears went 7–6 during Wilcox's second year in 2018. The Bears upset #15 Washington 12–10 and defeated USC 15–14 at the Coliseum in Los Angeles to snap a 14-year losing streak to the Trojans. The Bears lost 10–7 in overtime to TCU in the 2018 Cheez-It Bowl. In contrast to his predecessor, Sonny Dykes, Wilcox emphasized a strong defense, cutting Cal's points allowed per game from 42.6 (2016) to 20.4 (2018). However, the Bears’ offensive efficiency ranked as the second worst among all Power Five teams. After the regular season, Wilcox signed a new five-year contract to coach the Bears through the 2023 season.

==== 2019 ====
2019 represented the second of two winning seasons Justin Wilcox has achieved to date as a head football coach. The Bears improved to an 8–5 record under Wilcox in 2019. They achieved their highest ranking since 2009 when they were ranked No. 15 after a 4–0 start to the season. After defeating Stanford in the Big Game for the first time since 2009, the Bears earned bowl-eligibility two years in a row, again for the first time since 2009. The Bears defeated Illinois 35–20 in the 2019 Redbox Bowl. To date, 2019 proved to be the only year in which Justin Wilcox achieved a bowl victory and last winning season in his career as a head coach.

==== 2020 ====
2020 was the first of five consecutive losing seasons (to date) for Justin Wilcox. The Bears finished 1–3 in a COVID-shortened 2020 season, with their lone win coming against #21 Oregon.

==== 2021 ====
2021 was the second of five consecutive losing seasons (to date) for Wilcox. In 2021, the Bears went 5–7, including wins over USC and Stanford. Cal notched a Big Game record 636 total yards of offense in a 41–11 victory over Stanford. After the season, reports emerged citing an anonymous source that Wilcox was offered the head coaching position at Oregon and that he turned down the offer. This report was never confirmed by either Cal or Oregon, or by Wilcox himself. But due to his perceived willingness to stay in Berkeley, Cal gave Wilcox a new contract extension keeping him at Cal through the 2027 season.

==== 2022 ====
2022 was the third of five consecutive losing seasons (to date) for Wilcox. Cal finished 4–8 in 2022, the program's third straight losing season. Following a six-game losing streak, Wilcox fired offensive coordinator Bill Musgrave and offensive line coach Angus McClure. The Bears defeated Stanford 27–20 to win the Big Game for the third time in four seasons, and the first in Berkeley since 2008.

==== 2023 ====
2023 was the fourth of five consecutive losing seasons (to date) for Wilcox. The Bears finished 6–7 in 2023, the fourth consecutive losing season under Wilcox. They achieved road wins over rivals Stanford and UCLA to earn bowl eligibility for the first time since 2019. Cal's 27–15 victory in the Big Game was the program's third straight win over Stanford, and fourth in five years. The Bears were trounced 34–14 by Texas Tech in the Independence Bowl.

==== 2024 ====
2024 was the fifth of five consecutive losing seasons (to date) for Wilcox. The Bears finished 6–7 again in 2024, and 2–6 in conference in their inaugural season in the Atlantic Coast Conference. Cal defeated Stanford 24–21 in the Big Game, their fourth straight victory, and fifth in six seasons. Notably, Cal was 2-5 in games decided by less than seven points, and lost four consecutive games by a total of nine points. The Bears lost 24–13 to UNLV in the LA Bowl.

==== 2025 ====
In the offseason before the 2025 season, every single one of the running backs on Wilcox's team transferred to other schools. Wilcox also lost quarterback Fernando Mendoza to Indiana University, where Mendoza won the 2025 Heisman Trophy.

On September 21, 2025, Wilcox's Cal team was shutout by San Diego State by a final score of 34–0. Cal had been 14 point favorites to defeat San Diego State.

Through ten weeks, the Bears' opponents were a combined 24–34. The Bears played games against FCS Texas Southern and Mountain West Conference member San Diego State. Excluding these two teams, the Bears' Power-5 opponents had a combined record of 14–30.

==== Firing ====
Cal fired Wilcox with one game remaining in the 2025 season, shortly after getting blown out by archrival Stanford University by a score of 31–10 in the 128th Big Game.

In his nine year tenure at Cal, Wilcox had losing records in conference play every season.

== Family ==
Wilcox is the son of Dave Wilcox, an All-Pro linebacker for the San Francisco 49ers and a member of the Pro Football Hall of Fame. Inducted in 2000, he played 11 seasons in the National Football League (NFL), from 1964 to 1974, all with the 49ers. From Vale in eastern Oregon, Dave played college football at Boise Junior College, then transferred to Oregon in 1962.

Justin's brother, Josh Wilcox, was three years ahead in school and played tight end for the Ducks and two seasons in the NFL with the New Orleans Saints. Justin's uncle John Wilcox also played in the NFL, in the early 1960s.

== Head coaching record ==
Year	Team	Overall	Conference	Standing	Bowl/playoffs
California Golden Bears (Pac-12 Conference) (2017–2023)
2017	California	5–7	2–7	5th (North)	
2018	California	7–6	4–5	5th (North)	L Cheez-It
2019	California	8–5	4–5	T–2nd (North)	W Redbox
2020	California	1–3	1–3	T–5th (North)	
2021	California	5–7	4–5	4th (North)	
2022	California	4–8	2–7	T–9th	
2023	California	6–7	4–5	T–7th	L Independence
California Golden Bears (Atlantic Coast Conference) (2024–2025)
2024	California	6–7	2–6	T–14th	L LA
2025	California	6–5	3–4	(Note: Cal fired Wilcox with one game remaining.)	
California:		48–55	26–47		
Total:		48–55			
