= 2023 California Golden Bears football team =

American college football season

2023 California Golden Bears football

Independence Bowl, L 14–34 vs. Texas Tech
- Conference: Pac-12 Conference
- Record: 6–7 (4–5 Pac-12)
- Head coach: Justin Wilcox (7th season)
- Offensive coordinator: Jake Spavital (2nd season)
- Offensive scheme: Air raid
- Defensive coordinator: Peter Sirmon (4th season)
- Base defense: 2–4–5
- Captains: Matthew Cindric; Jackson Sirmon
- Home stadium: California Memorial Stadium

2023 Pac-12 Conference football standings
	Conf.			Overall
Team	W		L	W		L
No. 2 Washington y$^	9	–	0	14	–	1
No. 6 Oregon y	8	–	1	12	–	2
No. 11 Arizona	7	–	2	10	–	3
Oregon State	5	–	4	8	–	5
Utah	5	–	4	8	–	5
USC	5	–	4	8	–	5
California	4	–	5	6	–	7
UCLA	4	–	5	8	–	5
Washington State	2	–	7	5	–	7
Stanford	2	–	7	3	–	9
Arizona State*	2	–	7	3	–	9
Colorado	1	–	8	4	–	8
Championship: Washington 34, Oregon 31
^ – College Football Playoff participant; $ – Conference champion; y – Championship game participant; * – Ineligible for postseason play due to self-imposed ban for 2020 recruiting violations; Rankings from AP Poll

The 2023 California Golden Bears football team represented the University of California, Berkeley in the Pac-12 Conference during the 2023 NCAA Division I FBS football season. The Golden Bears were led by Justin Wilcox in his seventh year as the head coach. They played their home games at California Memorial Stadium in Berkeley, California.

This was California's final season in the Pac-12 Conference before they move to the Atlantic Coast Conference in 2024.

The California Golden Bears football team drew an average home attendance of 38,684 in 2023.

== Schedule ==
Date	Time	Opponent	Site	TV	Result	Attendance	Source
September 2	1:00 p.m.	at North Texas*	DATCU Stadium; Denton, TX	ESPNU	W 58–21	21,350	
September 9	7:30 p.m.	Auburn*	California Memorial Stadium; Berkeley, CA	ESPN	L 10–14	44,141	
September 16	1:00 p.m.	No. 5 (FCS) Idaho*	California Memorial Stadium; Berkeley, CA	P12N	W 31–17	36,810	
September 23	7:30 p.m.	at No. 8 Washington	Husky Stadium; Seattle, WA	ESPN	L 32–59	69,107	
September 30	12:00 p.m.	Arizona State	California Memorial Stadium; Berkeley, CA	P12N	W 24–21	34,353	
October 7	7:00 p.m.	No. 15 Oregon State^{†}	California Memorial Stadium; Berkeley, CA	P12N	L 40–52	34,930	
October 14	12:00 p.m.	at No. 16 Utah	Rice-Eccles Stadium; Salt Lake City, UT	P12N	L 14–34	52,115	
October 28	1:00 p.m.	No. 24 USC	California Memorial Stadium; Berkeley, CA	P12N	L 49–50	43,716	
November 4	2:30 p.m.	at No. 6 Oregon	Autzen Stadium; Eugene, OR	P12N	L 19–63	54,046	
November 11	1:00 p.m.	Washington State	California Memorial Stadium; Berkeley, CA	ESPN2	W 42–39	38,155	
November 18	3:30 p.m.	at Stanford	Stanford Stadium; Stanford, CA (Big Game)	P12N	W 27–15	52,971	
November 25	7:30 p.m.	at UCLA	Rose Bowl; Pasadena, CA (rivalry)	ESPN	W 33–7	42,439	
December 16	6:15 p.m.	vs. Texas Tech	Independence Stadium; Shreveport, LA (Independence Bowl)	ESPN	L 14–34	33,071	
*Non-conference game; ^{†}Homecoming; Rankings from Coaches' Poll released prior to the game; All times are in Pacific time

== Roster ==
2023 California Golden Bears football team roster
Players
Coaches
Offense

Pos.	#	Name	Class
RB	1	Jaydn Ott	So
WR	3	Jeremiah Hunter	Jr
RB	4	Justin Williams-Thomas	Fr
QB	5	Sam Jackson V	So
WR	7	Brian Hightower	Sr
WR	9	Taj Davis	Sr
QB	10	Ben Finley	So
WR	11	Mavin Anderson	So
WR	13	Nyziah Hunter	Fr
WR	14	Monroe Young	Sr
QB	15	Fernando Mendoza	Fr
WR	16	Mason Mangum	So
WR	18	Mason Starling	Jr
QB	19	Tyler Jensen	So
QB	20	Belay Brummel	Fr
RB	21	Byron Cardwell	So
RB	22	Isaiah Ifanse	Sr
RB	23	King Doerue	Jr
RB	24	Ashton Stredick	So
RB	25	Jaivian Thomas	Fr
WR	26	Grant Daley	So
QB	27	Brady Weingart	Fr
WR	28	Myles Reber	Fr
RB	33	Dean-Taylor Chapman	Fr
FB	34	Andy Alfieri	So
TE	40	Ben Marshall	Fr
FB	44	Beaux Tagaloa	Jr
TE	47	Moso'oipala Tuitele	Fr
OL	52	Nick Morrow	Fr
OL	54	Frederick Williams III	Fr
OL	60	Brian Driscoll	Jr
OL	62	Barrett Miller	Sr
OL	63	Brayden Rohme	Jr
OL	64	Joshua Stovall	Fr
OL	65	Dylan Jemtegaard	So
OL	66	Colin Hamilton	So
OL	67	Tyler Murphy	Fr
OL	68	Trent Ramsey	Fr
OL	70	Martin Tine	Jr
OL	71	Sioape Vatikani	So
OL	72	T. J. Session	Jr
OL	73	Matthew Cindric	Sr
OL	74	Matthew Wykoff	So
OL	76	Bastian Swinney	So
OL	77	Everett Johnson	Jr
OL	78	Dashaun Harris	Fr
OL	79	Ender Aguilar	So
WR	80	Jordan King	Fr
WR	81	Marquez Dortch	Fr
WR	82	Kenden Robinson Jr.	Jr
WR	83	Trond Grizzell	So
WR	84	Jaiven Plummer	Fr
WR	85	Marquis Montgomery	Jr
TE	86	Jeffrey Johnson	So
TE	87	Jack Endries	Fr
TE	88	J. T. Byrne	So
WR	89	Asher Alberding	Jr

Defense

Pos.	#	Name	Class
DB	2	Craig Woodson	Jr
DB	3	Nohl Williams	Jr
DB	4	Kaylin Moore	Jr
DB	5	Raymond Woodie III	Sr
DB	6	Jeremiah Earby	So
OLB	7	David Reese	Sr
ILB	8	Jackson Sirmon	Sr
DB	9	Patrick McMorris	Sr
ILB	10	Sergio Allen	So
DB	11	Tyson McWilliams	So
DB	13	Miles Williams	Jr
DB	15	Lu-Magia Hearns III	Jr
OLB	16	Henry Ikahihifo	Jr
DB	20	Cam Sidney	Fr
DB	21	Colin Gamble	Jr
DB	22	Matthew Littlejohn	Jr
DB	23	Dejuan Butler	So
DB	24	Marcus Scott II	Fr
DB	25	Sai Vadrawale III	Fr
ILB	27	Cade Uluave	Fr
DB	30	Mayze Bryant	Fr
ILB	31	Hunter Barth	So
ILB	32	Blake Antzoulatos	Jr
OLB	33	Myles Jernigan	Jr
DB	37	Julian Womack	Fr
DB	38	Nate Escalada	Fr
OLB	39	Michael Cooley	Fr
DB	41	Isaiah Young	Jr
ILB	42	Nate Rutchena	Jr
OLB	43	Ryan McCulloch	Fr
OLB	44	Xavier Carlton	Jr
OLB	46	Sam Ross	Fr
OLB	47	Moso'opala Tuitele	Fr
DL	49	Darius Long Jr.	Sr
OLB	50	Tidiane Jalloh	So
DL	51	Curlee Thomas IV	Fr
DL	52	Zurich Ashford	Fr
ILB	53	Kaleb Elarms-Orr	So
ILB	55	Muelu Iosefa	Jr
DL	56	Ieremia Ieremaia	So
ILB	57	B. J. Jones	Fr
OLB	58	Elijah Diaz	Fr
OLB	59	Murphy Glasgow	Fr
DL	75	Jaedon Roberts	Jr
DL	90	Brett Johnson	Jr
DL	91	Ricky Correia	Jr
OLB	92	Myles Williams	So
DL	93	R. J. Stephens	Fr
DL	94	Stanley Saole-McKenzie	So
DL	95	Akili Calhoun	So
DL	96	Derek Wilkins	So
DL	97	Tiumalu Afalava	Fr
DL	98	Nate Burrell	So
DL	99	Ethan Saunders	Jr

Special teams

Pos.	#	Name	Class
K	16	Michael Luckhurst	So
K	28	Spencer Brien	Fr
P	36	Thomas Lee	Sr
P	37	Lachlan Wilson	Jr
LS	45	David Bird	Fr
LS	47	Jake Arguello	So
LS	48	Wesley Brown	Jr
K	49	Mateen Bhaghani	Fr

Head coach

- Justin Wilcox

Coordinators/assistant coaches

- Jake Spavital – Offensive coordinator/quarterbacks
- Peter Sirmon – Defensive coordinator/inside linebackers
- Terrence Brown – Defensive backs
- Andrew Browning – Defensive linemen
- Tim Plough – Tight ends
- Mike Bloesch – Offensive linemen/run game coordinator
- Vic So'oto – Outside linebackers/special teams coordinator
- Aristotle Thompson – Running backs
- Burl Toler III – Wide receivers/recruiting coordinator
- Tre Watson – Defensive backs
- Zach Tinker – Special teams quality control
- Brian Johnson – Director, athletic performance

Legend

- (C) Team captain
- (S) Suspended
- (I) Ineligible
- Injured
- Redshirt

Roster
Last update: 10/28/23

== Game summaries ==
=== at North Texas ===
California Golden Bears (0–0) at North Texas Mean Green (0–0) – Game summary

Quarter	1	2	3	4	Total
Golden Bears	14	19	15	10	58
Mean Green	7	14	0	0	21

at DATCU Stadium • Denton, TX

- Date: September 2, 2023
- Game time: 3:00 p.m. CDT
- Game attendance: 21,350
- TV: ESPNU

Game information

First quarter

- (12:53) CAL – Jeremiah Hunter 23-yard pass from Sam Jackson V, Michael Luckhurst kick (Drive: 3 plays, 65 yards, 0:46; California 7–0)
- (11:04) UNT – Ja'Mori Maclin 3-yard pass from Stone Earle, Noah Rauschenberg kick (Drive: 5 plays, 75 yards, 1:49; Tied: 7–7)
- (1:04) CAL – Jaydn Ott 4-yard run, Michael Luckhurst kick (Drive: 4 plays, 14 yards, 1:39; California 14–7)

Second quarter

- (14:33) UNT – Ja'Mori Maclin 59-yard pass from Stone Earle, Noah Rauschenberg kick (Drive: 5 plays, 75 yards, 1:31; Tied 14–14)
- (7:30) CAL – Isaiah Ifanse 26-yard run, Michael Luckhurst kick (Drive: 7 plays, 44 yards, 2:21; California 21–14)
- (5:42) CAL – Jaydn Ott 66-yard run, Michael Luckhurst kick blocked (Drive: 2 plays, 75 yards, 0:29; California 27–14)
- (1:47) UNT – Xzavior Kautai 12-yard pass from Stone Earle, Noah Rauschenberg kick (Drive: 3 plays, 24 yards, 1:04; California 27–21)
- (0:07) CAL – Isaiah Ifanse 8-yard run, two-point pass conversion failed (Drive: 9 plays, 75 yards, 1:40; California 33–21)

Third quarter

- Isaiah Ifanse 1-yard run, Ben Finley pass to Jack Endries for two-point conversion (Drive: 9 plays, 75 yards, 3:36; California 41–21)
- Taj Davis 4-yard pass from Ben Finley, Michael Luckhurst kick (Drive: 8 plays, 32 yards, 3:15; California 48–21)

Fourth quarter

- Ashton Stredick 5-yard run, Michael Luckhurst kick (Drive: 7 plays, 57 yards, 3:14; California 55–21)
- Michael Luckhurst 31-yard field goal (Drive: 9 plays, 23 yards, 4:18; California 58–21)

Statistics	CAL	UNT
First downs	29	9
Plays–yards	95–679	53–225
Rushes–yards	56–357	27–41
Passing yards	322	184
Passing: comp–att–int	27–39–1	15–26–3
Time of possession	39:07	20:53

Team	Category	Player	Statistics
California	Passing	Ben Finley	24/34, 289 yards, TD, INT
California	Rushing	Jaydn Ott	20 carries, 188 yards, 2 TD
California	Receiving	Jeremiah Hunter	6 receptions, 64 yards, TD
North Texas	Passing	Stone Earle	12/19, 174 yards, 3 TD, 2 INT
North Texas	Rushing	Isaiah Johnson	6 carries, 34 yards
North Texas	Receiving	Ja'Mori Maclin	4 receptions, 122 yards, 2 TD

=== vs Auburn ===
Auburn Tigers (1–0) vs. California Golden Bears (1–0)

Quarter	1	2	3	4	Total
Tigers	0	7	0	7	14
Golden Bears	3	7	0	0	10

at California Memorial Stadium • Berkeley, CA

- Date: Saturday, September 9, 2023
- Game time: 7:30 p.m.
- Game weather: Sunny • Temperature: 66 °F (19 °C) • Wind: NE 8 mph
- Game attendance: 44,141
- Referee: Daniel Gautreaux
- TV announcers (ESPN): Dave Flemming (play-by-play), Brock Osweiler (analyst), Kayla Burton (sideline reporter)

Game information

First quarter

- (9:42) CAL – Michael Luckhurst 39-yard field goal (Drive: 8 plays, 13 yards, 3:51; California 3–0)

Second quarter

- (11:50) AUB – Jay Fair 13-yard pass from Payton Thorne, Alex McPherson kick (Drive: 3 plays, 17 yards, 1:11; Auburn 7–3)
- (4:47) CAL – Jaydn Ott 14-yard run, Michael Luckhurst kick (Drive: 6 plays, 65 yards, 2:33; California 10–7)

Third quarter

None

Fourth quarter

- (6:31) AUB – Rivaldo Fairweather 5-yard pass from Payton Thorne, Alex McPherson kick (Drive: 10 plays, 69 yards, 4:37; Auburn 14–7)

Statistics	AUB	CAL
First downs	12	19
Plays–yards	55–230	78–273
Rushes–yards	38–136	40–113
Passing yards	94	160
Passing: comp–att–int	10–17–1	21–38–2
Time of possession	25:12	34:48

Team	Category	Player	Statistics
Auburn	Passing	Payton Thorne	9/14, 94 yards, 2 TD, INT
Auburn	Rushing	Jarquez Hunter	11 carries, 53 yards
Auburn	Receiving	Rivaldo Fairweather	3 receptions, 39 yards, TD
California	Passing	Sam Jackson V	14/27, 126 yards, 2 INT
California	Rushing	Jaydn Ott	20 carries, 78 yards, TD
California	Receiving	Jeremiah Hunter	5 receptions, 35 yards

=== vs No. 5 (FCS) Idaho ===
No. 5 (FCS) Idaho Vandals (2–0) vs. California Golden Bears (1–1) – Game summary

Quarter	1	2	3	4	Total
No. 5 (FCS) Vandals	10	7	0	0	17
Golden Bears	0	14	14	3	31

at California Memorial Stadium • Berkeley, CA

- Date: September 16, 2023
- Game time: 1:00 p.m.
- Game attendance: 36,810
- TV: Pac-12 Network

Game information

First quarter

Second quarter

Third quarter

Fourth quarter

Statistics	IDHO	CAL
First downs	22	23
Plays–yards	72–387	68–370
Rushes–yards	26–108	43–256
Passing yards	279	114
Passing: comp–att–int	28–46–1	13–25–0
Time of possession	32:43	27:17

Team	Category	Player	Statistics
Idaho	Passing	Gevani McCoy	28/46, 279 yards, INT
Idaho	Rushing	Anthony Woods	11 carries, 56 yards, TD
Idaho	Receiving	Hayden Hatten	8 receptions, 80 yards
California	Passing	Sam Jackson V	12/23, 108 yards, 2 TD
California	Rushing	Isaiah Ifanse	22 carries, 137 yards, TD
California	Receiving	Jeremiah Hunter	5 receptions, 48 yards, TD

=== at No. 8 Washington ===
California Golden Bears (2–1) at No. 8 Washington Huskies (3–0) – Game summary

Quarter	1	2	3	4	Total
Golden Bears	6	6	7	13	32
No. 8 Huskies	24	21	7	7	59

at Husky Stadium • Seattle, WA

- Date: September 23, 2023
- Game time: 7:30 p.m. EDT
- Game weather: Cloudy, 58 °F (14 °C), Wind: S 5mph
- Game attendance: 69,107
- Referee: Chris Wiggins
- TV announcers (ESPN): Dave Flemming (play-by-play), Brock Osweiler (analyst), and Kayla Burton (sideline)

Game information

First quarter

Second quarter

Third quarter

Fourth quarter

Statistics	CAL	WASH
First downs	28	23
Plays–yards	81–502	62–529
Rushes–yards	35–139	30–140
Passing yards	363	389
Passing: comp–att–int	27–46–3	23–32–1
Time of possession	29:50	30:10

Team	Category	Player	Statistics
California	Passing	Ben Finley	17/32, 207 yards, 2 TD, 3 INT
California	Rushing	Jaydn Ott	14 carries, 40 yards, TD
California	Receiving	Trond Grizzell	4 receptions, 86 yards, TD
Washington	Passing	Michael Penix Jr.	19/25, 304 yards, 4 TD, 1 INT
Washington	Rushing	Dillon Johnson	10 carries, 66 yards, TD
Washington	Receiving	Ja'Lynn Polk	8 receptions, 127 yards, 2 TD

=== vs Arizona State ===
Arizona State Sun Devils (1–3) vs. California Golden Bears (2–2) – Game summary

Quarter	1	2	3	4	Total
Sun Devils	7	0	6	8	21
Golden Bears	7	3	7	7	24

at California Memorial Stadium • Berkeley, CA

- Date: September 30, 2023
- Game time: 12:00 p.m.
- Game weather: Cloudy, 61 °F (16 °C)
- Game attendance: 34,353
- Referee: Matthew Richards
- TV announcers (Pac-12 Network): J. B. Long (play-by-play), Shane Vereen (analyst)

Game information

First quarter

- (6:16) CAL – Isaiah Ifanse 1-yard run, Mateen Bhaghani kick (Drive: 7 plays, 68 yards, 2:56; California 7–0)
- (0:15) ASU – Cameron Skattebo 2-yard run, Dario Longhetto kick (Drive: 13 plays, 75 yards, 5:55; Tied 7–7)

Second quarter

- (8:18) CAL – Mateen Bhaghani 37-yard field goal (Drive: 8 plays, 22 yards, 2:27; California 10–7)

Third quarter

- (9:11) CAL – Jeremiah Hunter 21-yard pass from Sam Jackson V, Mateen Bhaghani kick (Drive: 4 plays, 31 yards, 2:01; California 17–7)
- (5:29) ASU – Dario Longhetto 24-yard field goal (Drive: 7 plays, 71 yards, 3:33; California 17–10)
- (0:44) ASU – Dario Longhetto 29-yard field goal (Drive: 6 plays, 69 yards, 2:13; California 17–13)

Fourth quarter

- (10:52) CAL – Jaydn Ott 2-yard run, Mateen Bhaghani kick (Drive: 3 plays, 11 yards, 1:14; California 24–13)
- (9:18) ASU – Trenton Bourguet 3-yard run, Elijhah Badger two-point pass to Trenton Bourguet (Drive: 4 plays, 48 yards, 1:23; California 24–21)

Statistics	ASU	CAL
First downs	17	19
Plays–yards	72–430	77–326
Rushes–yards	29–68	48–196
Passing yards	362	130
Passing: comp–att–int	27–43–1	12–28–0
Time of possession	30:18	29:42

Team	Category	Player	Statistics
Arizona State	Passing	Trenton Bourguet	26/41, 344 yards, INT
Arizona State	Rushing	Cameron Skattebo	24 carries, 59 yards, TD
Arizona State	Receiving	Cameron Skattebo	4 receptions, 98 yards
California	Passing	Sam Jackson V	12/28, 130 yards, TD
California	Rushing	Jaydn Ott	29 carries, 165 yards, TD
California	Receiving	Jeremiah Hunter	6 receptions, 89 yards, TD

=== vs No. 15 Oregon State ===
No. 15 Oregon State Beavers (4–1) at California Golden Bears (3–2) – Game summary

Quarter	1	2	3	4	Total
No. 15 Beavers	7	14	14	17	52
Golden Bears	0	17	15	8	40

at California Memorial Stadium • Berkeley, CA

- Date: October 7, 2023
- Game time: 7:00 p.m.
- Game attendance: 34,930
- Referee: Mark Duddy
- TV announcers (Pac-12 Network): J.B. Long, Max Browne

Game information

First quarter

Second quarter

Third quarter

Fourth quarter

Statistics	OSU	CAL
First downs	24	22
Plays–yards	71–499	65–448
Rushes–yards	43–203	33–241
Passing yards	296	207
Passing: comp–att–int	21–28–0	21–32–1
Time of possession	37:17	22:43

Team	Category	Player	Statistics
Oregon State	Passing	DJ Uiagalelei	19/25, 275 yards, 5 TD
Oregon State	Rushing	Damien Martinez	17 carries, 89 yards, TD
Oregon State	Receiving	Anthony Gould	7 receptions, 117 yards
California	Passing	Fernando Mendoza	21/32, 207 yards, 2 TD, INT
California	Rushing	Isaiah Ifanse	11 carries, 86 yards, 2 TD
California	Receiving	Taj Davis	7 receptions, 69 yards

=== at No. 16 Utah ===
California Golden Bears (3–3) at No. 16 Utah Utes (4–1) – Game summary

Quarter	1	2	3	4	Total
Golden Bears	7	0	7	0	14
No. 16 Utes	0	14	10	10	34

at Rice-Eccles Stadium • Salt Lake City, Utah

- Date: October 14, 2023
- Game time: 1:00 p.m. MST/12:00 p.m. PST
- Game attendance: 52,115
- TV announcers (Pac-12 Network): Roxy Bernstein, Lincoln Kennedy

Game information

First quarter

Second quarter

Third quarter

Fourth quarter

Statistics	CAL	Utah
First downs	16	21
Plays–yards	55–24	75–445
Rushes–yards	24–66	53–317
Passing yards	188	128
Passing: comp–att–int	15–31–1	15–22–0
Time of possession	22:07	37:53

Team	Category	Player	Statistics
California	Passing	Fernando Mendoza	10/17, 149 yards, 2 TD, INT
California	Rushing	Jaydn Ott	8 carries, 46 yards
California	Receiving	Taj Davis	7 receptions, 93 yards, TD
Utah	Passing	Bryson Barnes	15/21, 128 yards
Utah	Rushing	Sione Vaki	15 carries, 158 yards, 2 TD
Utah	Receiving	Mikey Matthews	7 receptions, 53 yards

=== vs No. 24 USC ===
No. 24 USC Trojans (6–2) vs. California Golden Bears (3–4) – Game summary

Quarter	1	2	3	4	Total
No. 24 Trojans	17	0	12	21	50
Golden Bears	14	14	8	13	49

at California Memorial Stadium • Berkeley, CA

- Date: October 28, 2023
- Game time: 1:00 p.m. PST
- Game attendance: 43,716
- Referee: Justin Elliott
- TV announcers (Pac-12 Network): Ted Robinson (play-by-play), Yogi Roth (analyst)

Game information

First quarter

Second quarter

Third quarter

Fourth quarter

Statistics	USC	CAL
First downs	20	29
Plays–yards	80–506	81–527
Rushes–yards	40–137	42–235
Passing yards	369	292
Passing: comp–att–int	23–40–0	25–39–1
Time of possession	32:36	27:24

Team	Category	Player	Statistics
USC	Passing	Caleb Williams	23/40, 369 yards, 2 TD
USC	Rushing	MarShawn Lloyd	17 carries, 115 yards, 2 TD
USC	Receiving	Tahj Washington	5 receptions, 102 yards
California	Passing	Fernando Mendoza	25/39, 292 yards, 2 TD, 1 INT
California	Rushing	Jaydn Ott	21 carries, 153 yards, 3 TD
California	Receiving	Jeremiah Hunter	8 receptions, 96 yards

=== at Oregon ===
California Golden Bears (3–5) at Oregon Ducks (7–1) – Game summary

Quarter	1	2	3	4	Total
Golden Bears	10	3	6	0	19
Ducks	14	21	7	21	63

at Autzen Stadium • Eugene, OR

- Date: November 4, 2023
- Game time: 2:30 p.m.
- Game attendance: 54,046
- TV: Pac-12 Network

Game information

First quarter

Second quarter

Third quarter

Fourth quarter

Statistics	CAL	ORE
First downs	16	32
Plays–yards	63–286	82–597
Rushes–yards	29–109	36–153
Passing yards	177	444
Passing: comp–att–int	18–34–1	35–46–1
Time of possession	23:26	36:34

Team	Category	Player	Statistics
California	Passing	Fernando Mendoza	18/34, 177 yards, INT
California	Rushing	Jaydn Ott	20 carries, 93 yards, TD
California	Receiving	Jeremiah Hunter	5 receptions, 64 yards
Oregon	Passing	Bo Nix	29/38, 386 yards, 4 TD, INT
Oregon	Rushing	Bucky Irving	18 carries, 89 yards, TD
Oregon	Receiving	Tez Johnson	12 receptions, 180 yards, 2 TD

=== vs Washington State ===
Washington State Cougars (4–5) vs. California Golden Bears (3–6) – Game summary

Quarter	1	2	3	4	Total
Cougars	7	14	3	15	39
Golden Bears	14	14	0	14	42

at California Memorial Stadium • Berkeley, CA

- Date: November 11, 2023
- Game time: 1:00 p.m.
- Game attendance: 38,155
- Referee: Mark Duddy
- TV: ESPN2

Game information

First quarter

Second quarter

Third quarter

Fourth quarter

Statistics	WSU	CAL
First downs	32	16
Plays–yards	97–483	51–327
Rushes–yards	37–125	36–177
Passing yards	358	150
Passing: comp–att–int	35–60–1	14–21–0
Time of possession	35:45	24:15

Team	Category	Player	Statistics
Washington State	Passing	Cam Ward	34/59, 354 yards, 3 TD, INT
Washington State	Rushing	Leo Pulalasi	11 carries, 66 yards
Washington State	Receiving	Josh Kelly	9 receptions, 130 yards, TD
California	Passing	Fernando Mendoza	14/21, 150 yards, 2 TD,
California	Rushing	Jaydn Ott	27 carries, 167 yards, TD
California	Receiving	Jeremiah Hunter	3 receptions, 45 yards

=== at Stanford ===
California Golden Bears (4–6) at Stanford Cardinal (3–7) – Game summary

Quarter	1	2	3	4	Total
Golden Bears	7	7	7	6	27
Cardinal	3	3	9	0	15

at Stanford Stadium • Stanford, CA

- Date: November 18, 2023
- Game time: 3:30 p.m.
- Game weather: {Cloudy, SW 9 mph
- Game attendance: 52,971
- Referee: Matthew Richards
- TV announcers (Pac-12 Network): Roxy Bernstein, Lincoln Kennedy

Game information

First quarter

- (5:03) CAL – Trond Grizzell 9-yard pass from Fernando Mendoza, Mateen Bhaghani kick (Drive: 7 plays, 88 yards, 2:32; California 7–0)
- (0:22) STAN – Joshua Karty 44-yard field goal (Drive: 12 plays, 49 yards, 4:41; California 7–3)

Second quarter

- (13:13) CAL – Trond Grizzell 54-yard pass from Fernando Mendoza, Mateen Bhaghani kick (Drive: 5 plays, 75 yards, 2:09; California 14–3)
- (0:54) STAN – Joshua Karty 53-yard field goal (Drive: 10 plays, 27 yards, 3:47; California 14–6)

Third quarter

- (5:45) CAL – Jaydn Ott 1-yard run, Mateen Bhaghani kick (Drive: 12 plays, 67 yards, 5:30; California 21–6)
- (4:25) STAN – Tiger Bachmeier 41-yard pass from Ashton Daniels (Drive: 3 plays, 75 yards, 1:20; California 21–12)
- (0:46) STAN – Joshua Karty 50-yard field goal (Drive: 7 plays, 27 yards, 2:03; California 21–15)

Fourth quarter

- (10:19) CAL – Jeremiah Hunter 8-yard pass from Fernando Mendoza (Drive: 13 plays, 75 yards, 5:27; California 27–15)

Statistics	CAL	STAN
First downs	29	12
Plays–yards	84–455	59–289
Rushes–yards	47–161	24–101
Passing yards	294	188
Passing: comp–att–int	24–37–1	18–35–0
Time of possession	35:36	24:24

Team	Category	Player	Statistics
California	Passing	Fernando Mendoza	24/36, 294 yards, 3 TD, INT
California	Rushing	Jaydn Ott	36 carries, 166 yards, TD
California	Receiving	Trond Grizzell	7 receptions, 136 yards, 2 TD
Stanford	Passing	Ashton Daniels	18/35, 188 yards, TD
Stanford	Rushing	Ashton Daniels	12 carries, 67 yards
Stanford	Receiving	Sam Roush	4 receptions, 62 yards

=== at UCLA ===
California Golden Bears (5–6) at UCLA Bruins (7–4) – Game summary

Quarter	1	2	3	4	Total
Golden Bears	6	14	0	0	20
Bruins	0	7	0	0	7

at Rose Bowl • Pasadena, CA

- Date: November 25, 2023
- Game time: 7:30 p.m.
- Game weather: Clear, 55 °F (13 °C)
- Game attendance: 42,439
- Referee: John Love
- TV announcers (ESPN): Dave Flemming, Brock Osweiler, Kayla Burton

Game information

First quarter

Second quarter

Third quarter

Fourth quarter

Statistics	CAL	UCLA
First downs	17	23
Plays–yards	62–302	83–379
Rushes–yards	32–124	36–70
Passing yards	178	309
Passing: comp–att–int	19–30–2	30–47–2
Time of possession	30:01	29:59

Team	Category	Player	Statistics
California	Passing	Fernando Mendoza	19/30, 178 yards, 2 TD, 2 INT
California	Rushing	Jaydn Ott	21 carries, 80 yards
California	Receiving	Jeremiah Hunter	8 receptions, 101 yards, 2 TD
UCLA	Passing	Dante Moore	23/38, 266 yards, TD, 2 INT
UCLA	Rushing	Carson Steele	12 carries, 53 yards
UCLA	Receiving	Logan Loya	9 receptions, 88 yards, TD

=== Vs. Texas Tech (Independence Bowl) ===
2023 Radiance Technologies Independence Bowl
California Golden Bears (6–6) at Texas Tech Red Raiders (6–6) – Game summary

Quarter	1	2	3	4	Total
Golden Bears	14	0	0	0	14
Red Raiders	7	17	7	3	34

at Independence Stadium • Shreveport, Louisiana

- Date: December 16
- Game time: 8:15 p.m. CST
- Game weather: Clear, 45 °F (7 °C)
- Game attendance: 33,071
- Referee: Jerry Magallanes
- TV announcers (ESPN): Kevin Connors (play-by-play), Rocky Boiman (analyst) and Marilyn Payne (sideline)

Game information

First quarter

- (14:45) CAL – Monroe Young 25-yard pass from Fernando Mendoza, Mateen Bhaghani kick (Drive: 1 play, 25 yards, 0:15; California 7–0)
- (4:19) TTU – Coy Eakin 27-yard pass from Behren Morton, Gino Garcia kick (Drive: 10 plays, 93 yards, 4:11; Tied 7–7)
- (2:38) CAL – Jaydn Ott 1-yard run, Mateen Bhaghani kick (Drive: 5 plays, 74 yards, 1:41; California 14–7)

Second quarter

- (12:16) TTU – Mason Tharp 15-yard pass from Behren Morton, Gino Garcia kick (Drive: 11 plays, 65 yards, 5:22; Tied 14–14)
- (9:49) TTU – Loic Fouonji 14-yard pass from Behren Morton, Gino Garcia kick (Drive: 5 plays, 59 yards, 5:22; Texas Tech 21–14)
- (0:03) TTU – Gino Garcia 25-yard field goal (Drive: 9 plays, 47 yards, 2:27; Texas Tech 24–14)

Third quarter

- (4:36) TTU – Tahj Brooks 7-yard run, Gino Garcia kick (Drive: 2 plays, 15 yards, 0:49; Texas Tech 31–14)

Fourth quarter

- (4:08) TTU – Gino Garcia 37-yard field goal (Drive: 4 plays, 1 yards, 1:44; Texas Tech 34–14)

Statistics	California	Texas Tech
First downs	15	24
Plays–yards	64–353	80–384
Rushes–yards	31–69	36–128
Passing yards	284	256
Passing: comp–att–int	22–33–3	27–44–1
Time of possession	26:25	31:02

Team	Category	Player	Statistics
California	Passing	Fernando Mendoza	22/23, 261 yards, TD, 3 INT
California	Rushing	Jaydn Ott	16 carries, 45 yards, TD
California	Receiving	Trond Grizzell	4 receptions, 80 yards
Texas Tech	Passing	Behren Morton	27/43, 256 yards, 3 TD, INT
Texas Tech	Rushing	Tahj Brooks	22 carries, 98 yards, TD
Texas Tech	Receiving	Coy Eakin	7 receptions, 106 yards, TD
