= Sam Jackson V =

American football player (born 2003)

Sam Jackson
No. 18
- Position: Wide receiver

Personal information
- Born: April 21, 2003 (age 23)
- Listed height: 5 ft 10 in (1.78 m)
- Listed weight: 189 lb (86 kg)

Career information
- High school: Naperville Central (Naperville, Illinois)
- College: TCU (2021–2022); California (2023); Auburn (2024); Oklahoma State (2025)
- NFL draft: 2026: undrafted
- Stats at ESPN

Sam Jackson V (born April 21, 2003) is an American football wide receiver and quarterback. He played college football for the TCU Horned Frogs, the California Golden Bears, the Auburn Tigers, and the Oklahoma State Cowboys.

== Early life ==
A Chicago native, Jackson attended Bolingbrook High School in Bolingbrook, Illinois, before transferring to Naperville Central High School in Naperville, Illinois as a sophomore. As a sophomore, he played wide receiver on the football team and recorded 50 receptions for 847 yards and 14 touchdowns. Jackson was converted to a quarterback as a junior in 2019 and passed for 1,727 yards and 16 touchdowns. He did not play his senior season due to the COVID-19 pandemic. Jackson committed to play college football at TCU after having previously committed to Minnesota and Purdue.

== College career ==
=== TCU ===
In week 11 of the 2021 season, Jackson completed his first career pass, a 62-yard strike to Taye Barber. In the 2022 season opener, he rushed for 44 yards and his first career touchdown in a 38–13 win over Colorado. In a week 2 win over Tarleton State, Jackson went four for four on his passes for 58 yards, also punching in a one-yard rushing touchdown. Jackson finished the 2022 season going five for five for 63 yards, while also rushing for 64 yards and two touchdowns. After the season he entered his name into the NCAA transfer portal.

=== California ===
Jackson announced that he had decided to transfer to California to continue his collegiate career. Jackson was named the California starting quarterback for their week one matchup versus North Texas.

On December 11, 2023, Jackson announced that he would be entering the transfer portal for the second time.

=== Auburn ===
On December 27, 2023, Jackson announced that he would be transferring to Auburn and would play as a wide receiver.

=== Oklahoma State ===
On January 4, 2025, Jackson announced committed to Oklahoma State.

=== Statistics ===
Season	Team	Games			Passing								Rushing				Receiving			
Season	Team	GP	GS	Record (Note: Accounts for only GS as a QB)	Cmp	Att	Pct	Yds	Y/A	TD	Int	Rtg	Att	Yds	Avg	TD	Rec	Yds	Avg	TD
2021	TCU	2	0	—	1	1	100.0	77	77.0	0	0	764.8	6	15	2.5	0	—	—	—	—
2022	TCU	5	0	—	5	5	100.0	63	12.6	0	0	205.8	9	64	7.1	2	—	—	—	—
2023	California	5	3	3–0	51	97	52.6	556	5.7	5	2	113.6	26	59	2.3	1	—	—	—	—
2024	Auburn	9	0	—	Did not record pass attempt								2	0	0.0	0	2	63	31.5	1
2025	Oklahoma State	12	3	0–3	35	66	53.0	351	5.3	1	2	96.6	32	-3	-0.1	1	10	86	8.6	0
Career		33	6	3–3	92	169	54.4	1,047	6.2	6	4	113.5	75	135	1.8	4	12	149	12.4	1

== Professional career ==
Pre-draft measurables
Height	Weight	Arm length	Hand span	Wingspan	40-yard dash	10-yard split	20-yard split	20-yard shuttle	Three-cone drill	Vertical jump	Broad jump
5 ft 9 3/4 in (1.77 m)	189 lb (86 kg)	31 1/8 in (0.79 m)	10 3/8 in (0.26 m)	6 ft 3 1/4 in (1.91 m)	4.55 s	1.63 s	2.60 s	4.33 s	7.05 s	36.5 in (0.93 m)	10 ft 7 in (3.23 m)
All values from Pro Day

In May 2026, he attended rookie minicamp with the New York Jets.
