= Bralyn Lux =

American football player (born 2000)

No. 21 – Cincinnati Bengals
- Position: Cornerback
- Roster status: Practice squad

Personal information
- Born: August 28, 2000 (age 26); San Jose, California, U.S.
- Listed height: 5 ft 10 in (1.78 m)
- Listed weight: 180 lb (82 kg)

Career information
- High school: The King's Academy (Sunnyvale, California)
- College: Fresno State (2019–2022); Texas Tech (2023–2024)
- NFL draft: 2025: undrafted

Career history
- Cincinnati Bengals (2025–present)

Career NFL statistics as of 2025
- Games played: 1
- Tackles: 3
- Stats at Pro Football Reference

Bralyn Lux (born August 28, 2000) is an American professional football cornerback for the Cincinnati Bengals of the National Football League (NFL). He played college football for the Texas Tech Red Raiders.

== Early life and college career ==
Lux was born on August 28, 2000, and grew up in San Jose, California. He attended The King's Academy in Sunnyvale where he competed in football and track and field, breaking the school long jump record. He played football as a running back and defensive back and was an all-area and all-conference performer. As a senior, he ran for 1,811 yards and 24 touchdowns. He walked-on to college football for the Fresno State Bulldogs as a defensive back.

Lux redshirted as a true freshman in 2019. He then became a starter in 2020, posting a team-best 30 tackles along with four pass breakups and an interception. In 2021, he tallied 24 tackles and four pass breakups in eight starts, followed by 35 tackles and two sacks in eight games in 2022. Lux transferred to the Texas Tech Red Raiders in 2023. He became their top cornerback and posted 40 tackles, eight pass breakups and an interception in his first year there. In nine games played in his final season, 2024, he recorded 32 tackles and returned an interception 44 yards for a touchdown.

== Professional career ==
Pre-draft measurables
Height	Weight	Arm length	Hand span	Wingspan	40-yard dash	10-yard split	20-yard split	20-yard shuttle	Three-cone drill	Vertical jump	Broad jump	Bench press
5 ft 10 in (1.78 m)	179 lb (81 kg)	29 5/8 in (0.75 m)	9 1/8 in (0.23 m)	5 ft 11 in (1.80 m)	4.51 s	1.51 s	2.57 s	4.10 s	6.95 s	33.5 in (0.85 m)	9 ft 10 in (3.00 m)	5 reps
All values from Pro Day

After going unselected in the 2025 NFL draft, Lux signed with the Cincinnati Bengals as an undrafted free agent. On August 26, 2025, he was waived by the Bengals as part of the final roster cuts and re-signed to the practice squad the next day. He was elevated to the active roster for his team's Week 16 and Week 17 games against the Miami Dolphins and Arizona Cardinals, respectively, and made his NFL debut in the latter, recording three tackles.

Lux signed a reserve/future contract with Cincinnati on January 5, 2026. On August 30, Lux was waived by Cincinnati as a part of final roster cuts; he was re-signed to the team's practice squad the next day.
