= Drae McCray =

American football player (born 2002)

No. 86
- Position: Wide receiver

Personal information
- Born: September 4, 2002 (age 24)
- Listed height: 5 ft 9 in (1.75 m)
- Listed weight: 185 lb (84 kg)

Career information
- High school: North Florida Christian (Tallahassee, Florida)
- College: Austin Peay (2021–2022); Texas Tech (2023–2024)
- NFL draft: 2025: undrafted

Career history
- Saskatchewan Roughriders (2025)

Awards and highlights
- All-ASUN Conference (2022); First-team All-OVC (2021)

Career CFL statistics as of 2025
- Kickoff return yards: 142
- Punt return yards: 247
- Stats at CFL.ca

Drae McCray (born September 4, 2002) is an American professional football wide receiver. McCray played college football for the Austin Peay Governors and the Texas Tech Red Raiders. He had a stint with the Saskatchewan Roughriders of the Canadian Football League (CFL).

== College career ==
McCray played college football for Austin Peay from 2021 to 2022 and Texas Tech from 2023 to 2024. As a true freshman he was named to First-team All-OVC honors. In his second and final season at Austin Peay, he was named to the ASUN All-Conference team. He finished his career with the Governors starting in all 22 games, catching 129 passes for 1,888 yards and 17 touchdowns.

For his junior year, McCray transferred to Texas Tech University and had an immediate impact as a kick returner, finishing third in the country in punt return yards. McCray played in 23 games as a Red Raider recording 41 catches for 329 yards and two touchdowns. He returned 41 kickoffs for 1,113 yards and one touchdown in his Texas Tech career.

== Professional career ==
On May 3, 2025, McCray signed with the Saskatchewan Roughriders. He made his professional debut against the BC Lions on July 19. McCray returned three kickoffs for 74 yards and three punts for 44 yards. He was released on October 7, 2025. McCray played in five games for Saskatchewan, recording 142 kickoff return yards and 247 punt return yards.
