= Jaydn Ott =

American football player (born 2002)

No. 34 – Kansas City Chiefs
- Position: Running back
- Roster status: Active

Personal information
- Born: December 16, 2002 (age 23); Chino, California, U.S.
- Listed height: 5 ft 11 in (1.80 m)
- Listed weight: 208 lb (94 kg)

Career information
- High school: Norco High School (Norco, California)
- College: California (2022–2024); Oklahoma (2025)
- NFL draft: 2026: undrafted

Career history
- Kansas City Chiefs (2026–present)

Awards and highlights
- First-team All-Pac-12 (2023)

Career NFL statistics as of Week 7, 2026
- Games played: 1
- Stats at Pro Football Reference

Jaydn Ott (born December 16, 2002) is an American professional football running back for the Kansas City Chiefs of the National Football League (NFL). He played college football for the California Golden Bears and Oklahoma Sooners.

== Early life ==
Ott grew up in Norco, California and initially attended Norco High School. He committed to play college football at Oregon as a freshman in high school. After his freshman year Ott moved to Las Vegas, Nevada and transferred to Bishop Gorman High School. As a sophomore, Ott rushed for 11.7 yards per carry. He returned to Norco before the start of his senior year. Ott rushed for 1,140 yards and 17 touchdowns on 114 carries as a senior. Ott decommitted from Oregon during his sophomore year and later committed to play at California. He re-opened his recruitment as a senior, but ultimately signed a National Letter of Intent to play at Cal.

== College career ==
=== California ===
==== 2022 ====
Ott rushed for 104 yards on 17 carries and caught two passes for 26 yards and one touchdown in his collegiate debut against UC Davis. He made headlines in week 4 after rushing for 274 yards, the third-most in a game in school history and most ever by a Pac-12 freshman, and three touchdowns in a 49–31 win over Arizona. As a true freshman, Ott ran for 897 yards and eight touchdowns, while adding another 321 yards and three touchdowns through the air. He led all Pac-12 freshmen in all-purpose yards per game, all-purpose yards, total touchdowns and rushing touchdowns. Ott was named a Freshman All-American for the 2022 season.

==== 2023 ====
As a sophomore, Ott continued to see success, scoring 15 total touchdowns and running for a Pac-12 high 1,315 rushing yards. He earned first-team All-Pac-12 honors, and was a candidate for the Doak Walker, Maxwell and Walter Camp Awards. Following the season, Ott announced via social media that he would be returning to Cal for the 2024 season.

=== Oklahoma ===
On April 15, 2025, Ott announced that he would be transferring to Oklahoma. Ott was unable to recapture the skills and success he had at California. He never started a game at Oklahoma, where he only earned 21 carries in the 2025 season. He spent the season as a backup, third, or fourth string player -- he did not score a touchdown.

=== Statistics ===
Year	Team	Games		Rushing				Receiving			
Year	Team	GP	GS	Att	Yds	Avg	TD	Rec	Yds	Avg	TD
2022	California	12	10	170	897	5.3	8	46	345	7.5	3
2023	California	12	12	246	1,315	5.3	12	25	169	6.8	2
2024	California	10	10	116	385	3.3	4	24	222	9.3	1
2025	Oklahoma	7	0	21	68	3.2	0	2	10	5.0	0
Career		41	32	553	2,665	4.8	24	97	746	7.7	6

== Professional career ==
Pre-draft measurables
Height	Weight	Arm length	Hand span	Wingspan	40-yard dash	10-yard split	20-yard split	20-yard shuttle	Three-cone drill	Vertical jump	Broad jump	Bench press
5 ft 11 in (1.80 m)	198 lb (90 kg)	30 3/4 in (0.78 m)	8 3/4 in (0.22 m)	6 ft 1 5/8 in (1.87 m)	4.49 s	1.53 s	2.56 s	4.24 s	7.06 s	40.5 in (1.03 m)	10 ft 11 in (3.33 m)	16 reps
All values from Pro Day

Ott signed with the Kansas City Chiefs as an undrafted free agent on May 1, 2026. On August 30, Ott was waived by the Chiefs as a part of final roster cuts; he was re-signed to the practice squad the next day. He was promoted to the active roster on October 24.

== Personal life ==
Ott is of partial Samoan descent.
