= 2022 Ole Miss Rebels football team =

American college football season

2022 Ole Miss Rebels football

Texas Bowl, L 25–42 vs. Texas Tech
- Conference: Southeastern Conference
- Western Division
- Record: 8–5 (4–4 SEC)
- Head coach: Lane Kiffin (3rd season)
- Co-offensive coordinators: John David Baker (1st season); Charlie Weis Jr. (1st season)
- Offensive scheme: Veer and shoot
- Co-defensive coordinators: Maurice Crum Jr. (1st season); Chris Partridge (3rd season)
- Base defense: Multiple
- Home stadium: Vaught–Hemingway Stadium

2022 Southeastern Conference football standings
	Conf.			Overall
Team	W		L	W		L
Eastern Division
No. 1 Georgia xy$#^	8	–	0	15	–	0
No. 6 Tennessee	6	–	2	11	–	2
No. 23 South Carolina	4	–	4	8	–	5
Kentucky	3	–	5	7	–	6
Florida	3	–	5	6	–	7
Missouri	3	–	5	6	–	7
Vanderbilt	2	–	6	5	–	7
Western Division
No. 16 LSU xy	6	–	2	10	–	4
No. 5 Alabama x	6	–	2	11	–	2
No. 20 Mississippi State	4	–	4	9	–	4
Ole Miss	4	–	4	8	–	5
Arkansas	3	–	5	7	–	6
Auburn	2	–	6	5	–	7
Texas A&M	2	–	6	5	–	7
Championship: Georgia 50, LSU 30
# – College Football Playoff champion; ^ – College Football Playoff participant; $ – Conference champion; x – Division champion/co-champions; y – Championship game participant; Rankings from AP Poll

The 2022 Ole Miss Rebels football team represented the University of Mississippi in the 2022 NCAA Division I FBS football season. The Rebels played their home games at Vaught–Hemingway Stadium in Oxford, Mississippi, and competed in the Western Division of the Southeastern Conference (SEC). They were led by third-year head coach Lane Kiffin.

== Schedule ==
Ole Miss and the SEC announced the 2022 football schedule on September 21, 2021.

Date	Time	Opponent	Rank	Site	TV	Result	Attendance
September 3	3:00 p.m.	Troy*	No. 21	Vaught–Hemingway Stadium; Oxford, MS	SECN	W 28–10	60,533
September 10	6:00 p.m.	Central Arkansas*	No. 22	Vaught–Hemingway Stadium; Oxford, MS	ESPN+/SECN+	W 59–3	58,373
September 17	2:30 p.m.	at Georgia Tech*	No. 20	Bobby Dodd Stadium; Atlanta, GA	ABC	W 42–0	40,293
September 24	3:00 p.m.	Tulsa*	No. 16	Vaught–Hemingway Stadium; Oxford, MS	SECN	W 35–27	60,641
October 1	11:00 a.m.	No. 7 Kentucky^{†}	No. 14	Vaught–Hemingway Stadium; Oxford, MS (SEC Nation)	ESPN	W 22–19	64,828
October 8	3:00 p.m.	at Vanderbilt	No. 9	FirstBank Stadium; Nashville, TN (rivalry)	SECN	W 52–28	31,567
October 15	11:00 a.m.	Auburn	No. 9	Vaught–Hemingway Stadium; Oxford, MS (rivalry)	ESPN	W 48–34	65,243
October 22	2:30 p.m.	at LSU	No. 7	Tiger Stadium; Baton Rouge, LA (Magnolia Bowl / SEC Nation)	CBS	L 20–45	100,821
October 29	6:30 p.m.	at Texas A&M	No. 15	Kyle Field; College Station, TX	SECN	W 31–28	101,084
November 12	2:30 p.m.	No. 9 Alabama	No. 11	Vaught–Hemingway Stadium; Oxford, MS (rivalry)	CBS	L 24–30	65,923
November 19	6:30 p.m.	at Arkansas	No. 14	Donald W. Reynolds Razorback Stadium; Fayetteville, AR (rivalry)	SECN	L 27–42	71,365
November 24	6:00 p.m.	Mississippi State	No. 20	Vaught–Hemingway Stadium; Oxford, MS (Egg Bowl)	ESPN	L 22–24	62,487
December 28	8:00 p.m.	vs. Texas Tech*		NRG Stadium; Houston, TX (Texas Bowl)	ESPN	L 25–42	53,251
*Non-conference game; ^{†}Homecoming; Rankings from AP Poll (and CFP Rankings, after November 1) - Released prior to game; All times are in Central time

== Game summaries ==
=== Troy ===
Uniform Combination
Helmet	Jersey	Pants

Troy Trojans (0–0) at No. 21 Ole Miss Rebels (0–0)

Quarter	1	2	3	4	Total
Trojans	0	3	0	7	10
No. 21 Rebels	7	14	7	0	28

at Vaught–Hemingway Stadium • Oxford, MS

- Date: Saturday, September 3, 2022
- Game time: 3:00 p.m. CST
- Game weather: Sunny • Temperature: 86 °F (30 °C)
- Game attendance: 60,533
- Referee: Matt Loeffler
- TV announcers (SECN):
  Taylor Zarzour (play-by-play)
  Matt Stinchcomb (color)
  Alyssa Lang (sideline)

Game information

First Quarter

- (2:25) Ole Miss – Ulysses Bentley IV 2 yard run (Jonathan Cruz kick)
  Ole Miss 7–0; 9 plays, 82 yards, 2:13

Second Quarter

- (11:51) Ole Miss – Jonathan Mingo 2 yard run (Jonathan Cruz kick)
  Ole Miss 14–0; 10 plays, 79 yards, 3:01
- (6:38) Ole Miss – Quinshon Judkins 2 yard run (Jonathan Cruz kick)
  Ole Miss 21–0; 11 plays, 83 yards, 3:40
- (0:00) Troy – Brooks Buce 31 yard field goal
  Ole Miss 21–3; 11 plays, 47 yards, 3:09

Third Quarter

- (10:42) Ole Miss – Malik Heath 12 yard pass from Jaxson Dart (Jonathan Cruz kick)
  Ole Miss 28–3; 13 plays, 75 yards, 4:18

Fourth Quarter

- (0:57) Troy – RaeJae' Johnson 3 yard run from Gunnar Watson (Brooks Buce kick)
  Ole Miss 28–10; 11 plays, 39 yards, 5:07

Statistics	TROY	MISS
First downs	20	24
Total yards	346	433
Rushes/yards	33/60	44/266
Passing yards	286	167
Passing: Comp–Att–Int	35–48–1	19–29–1
Time of possession	36:58	23:02

Team	Category	Player	Statistics
Troy	Passing	Gunnar Watson	34–47, 275 yards, 1 TD, 1 INT
Troy	Rushing	Kimani Vidal	12 carries, 48 yards
Troy	Receiving	Jabre Barber	5 receptions, 60 yards
Ole Miss	Passing	Jaxson Dart	18–27, 154 yards, 1 TD, 1 INT
Ole Miss	Rushing	Zach Evans	20 carries, 130 yards
Ole Miss	Receiving	Michael Trigg	4 receptions, 33 yards

=== Central Arkansas ===
Uniform Combination
Helmet	Jersey	Pants

Central Arkansas Bears (0–1) at No. 22 Ole Miss Rebels (1–0)

Quarter	1	2	3	4	Total
Bears	0	0	0	3	3
No. 22 Rebels	28	3	21	7	59

at Vaught–Hemingway Stadium • Oxford, MS

- Date: Saturday, September 10, 2022
- Game time: 6:00 p.m. CST
- Game weather: Light Rain • Temperature: 77 °F (25 °C)
- Game attendance: 58,373
- Referee: Lee Hedrick
- TV announcers (ESPN+/SECN+):
  Drew Carter (play-by-play)
  Aaron Murray (color)

Game information

First Quarter

- (12:55) Ole Miss – Michael Trigg 7 yard pass from Luke Altmyer (Jonathan Cruz kick)
  Ole Miss 7–0; 6 plays, 70 yards, 2:05
- (7:09) Ole Miss – Ladarius Tennison 25 yard fumble recovery (Jonathan Cruz kick)
  Ole Miss 14–0
- (5:02) Ole Miss – Michael Trigg 4 yard pass from Luke Altmyer (Jonathan Cruz kick)
  Ole Miss 21–0; 2 plays, 4 yards, 0:33
- (0:21) Ole Miss – Luke Altmyer 1 yard run (Jonathan Cruz kick)
  Ole Miss 28–0; 7 plays, 65 yards, 2:29

Second Quarter

- (0:00) Ole Miss – Jonathan Cruz 41 yard field goal
  Ole Miss 31–0; 7 plays, 57 yards, 0:51

Third Quarter

- (11:38) Ole Miss – Zach Evans 3 yard run (Jonathan Cruz kick)
  Ole Miss 38–0; 5 plays, 69 yards, 1:43
- (8:09) Ole Miss – Michael Trigg 2 yard pass from Jaxson Dart (Jonathan Cruz kick)
  Ole Miss 45–0; 5 plays, 65 yards, 1:49
- (1:19) Ole Miss – Malik Heath 6 yard pass from Jaxson Dart (Jonathan Cruz kick)
  Ole Miss 52–0; 7 plays, 54 yards, 2:37

Fourth Quarter

- (9:54) Central Arkansas – Hayden Ray 31 yard field goal
  Ole Miss 52–3; 12 plays, 62 yards, 6:20
- (3:23) Ole Miss – Ulysses Bentley IV 11 yard run (Christian Schanefelt kick)
  Ole Miss 59–3; 1 play, 11 yards, 0:07

Statistics	UCA	MISS
First downs	12	25
Total yards	233	510
Rushes/yards	40/102	37/233
Passing yards	131	277
Passing: Comp–Att–Int	14–31–2	18–32–1
Time of possession	36:16	23:44

Team	Category	Player	Statistics
Central Arkansas	Passing	Will McElvain	13–27, 126 yards, 1 INT
Central Arkansas	Rushing	Darius Hale	15 carries, 48 yards
Central Arkansas	Receiving	Jarrod Barnes	6 receptions, 84 yards
Ole Miss	Passing	Jaxson Dart	10–15, 182 yards, 2 TD
Ole Miss	Rushing	Quinshon Judkins	10 carries, 104 yards
Ole Miss	Receiving	Jonathan Mingo	3 receptions, 103 yards

=== At Georgia Tech ===
Uniform Combination
Helmet	Jersey	Pants

No. 20 Ole Miss Rebels (2–0) at Georgia Tech Yellow Jackets (1–1)

Quarter	1	2	3	4	Total
No. 20 Rebels	14	7	21	0	42
Yellow Jackets	0	0	0	0	0

at Bobby Dodd Stadium • Atlanta, GA

- Date: Saturday, September 17, 2022
- Game time: 2:30 p.m. CST (3:30 p.m. local EST)
- Game weather: Sunny • Temperature: 83 °F (28 °C)
- Game attendance: 40,293
- Referee: Riley Johnson
- TV announcers (ABC):
  Dave Pasch (play-by-play)
  Dusty Dvoracek (color)
  Tom Luginbill (sideline)

Game information

First Quarter

- (13:34) Ole Miss – Zach Evans 3 yard run (Jonathan Cruz kick)
  Ole Miss 7–0; 5 plays, 74 yards, 1:21
- (9:51) Ole Miss – Quinshon Judkins 7 yard run (Jonathan Cruz kick)
  Ole Miss 14–0; 6 plays, 20 yards, 1:49

Second Quarter

- (5:36) Ole Miss – Zach Evans 26 yard run (Jonathan Cruz kick)
  Ole Miss 21–0; 6 plays, 77 yards, 1:58

Third Quarter

- (8:51) Ole Miss – Quinshon Judkins 1 yard run (Jonathan Cruz kick)
  Ole Miss 28–0; 8 plays, 63 yards, 3:18
- (5:20) Ole Miss – Ulysses Bentley IV 15 yard run (Jonathan Cruz kick)
  Ole Miss 35–0; 7 plays, 69 yards, 2:12
- (0:02) Ole Miss – Ulysses Bentley IV 1 yard run (Jonathan Cruz kick)
  Ole Miss 42–0; 12 plays, 68 yards, 4:00

Fourth Quarter

- No scoring plays

Statistics	MISS	GT
First downs	28	13
Total yards	547	214
Rushes/yards	62/316	34/53
Passing yards	231	161
Passing: Comp–Att–Int	12–19–1	18–32–0
Time of possession	30:53	29:07

Team	Category	Player	Statistics
Ole Miss	Passing	Jaxson Dart	10–16, 207 yards, 1 INT
Ole Miss	Rushing	Zach Evans	18 carries, 134 yards, 2 TD
Ole Miss	Receiving	Malik Heath	4 receptions, 78 yards
Georgia Tech	Passing	Jeff Sims	18–32, 161 yards
Georgia Tech	Rushing	Hassan Hall	8 carries, 27 yards
Georgia Tech	Receiving	Malik Rutherford	4 receptions, 52 yards

=== Tulsa ===
Uniform Combination
Helmet	Jersey	Pants

Tulsa Golden Hurricane (2–1) at No. 16 Ole Miss Rebels (3–0)

Quarter	1	2	3	4	Total
Golden Hurricane	14	3	3	7	27
No. 16 Rebels	7	28	0	0	35

at Vaught–Hemingway Stadium • Oxford, MS

- Date: Saturday, September 24, 2022
- Game time: 3:00 p.m. CST
- Game weather: Sunny • Temperature: 90 °F (32 °C)
- Game attendance: 60,641
- Referee: James Carter
- TV announcers (SECN):
  Dave Neal (play-by-play)
  Deuce McAllister (color)

Game information

First Quarter

- (13:21) Ole Miss – Zach Evans 20 yard run (Jonathan Cruz kick)
  Ole Miss 7–0; 6 plays, 75 yards, 1:39
- (7:55) Tulsa – Davis Brin 1 yard run (Zack Long kick)
  Tied 7–7; 12 plays, 87 yards, 5:21
- (3:17) Tulsa – Isaiah Epps 20 yard pass from Davis Brin (Zack Long kick)
  Tulsa 14–7; 8 plays, 75 yards, 3:27

Second Quarter

- (14:25) Ole Miss – Quinshon Judkins 4 yard run (Jonathan Cruz kick)
  Tied 14–14; 12 plays, 75 yards, 3:52
- (10:31) Ole Miss – Malik Heath 31 yard pass from Jaxson Dart (Jonathan Cruz kick)
  Ole Miss 21–14; 4 plays, 64 yards, 1:06
- (5:01) Ole Miss – Quinshon Judkins 1 yard run (Jonathan Cruz kick)
  Ole Miss 28–14; 12 plays, 93 yards, 3:58
- (1:25) Ole Miss – Jonathan Mingo 31 yard pass from Jaxson Dart (Jonathan Cruz kick)
  Ole Miss 35–14; 2 plays, 46 yards, 0:17
- (0:00) Tulsa – Zack Long 28 yard field goal
  Ole Miss 35–17; 6 plays, 65 yards, 1:25

Third Quarter

- (10:16) Tulsa – Zack Long 20 yard field goal
  Ole Miss 35–20; 11 plays, 73 yards, 4:44

Fourth Quarter

- (14:38) Tulsa – Isaiah Epps 17 yard pass from Braylon Braxton (Zack Long kick)
  Ole Miss 35–27; 11 plays, 97 yards, 4:33

Statistics	TUL	MISS
First downs	26	27
Total yards	457	462
Rushes/yards	43/262	51/308
Passing yards	195	154
Passing: Comp–Att–Int	16–34–1	13–24–0
Time of possession	34:13	25:47

Team	Category	Player	Statistics
Tulsa	Passing	Davis Brin	7–13, 112 yards, 1 TD
Tulsa	Rushing	Bill Jackson	8 carries, 77 yards
Tulsa	Receiving	Isaiah Epps	4 receptions, 62 yards, 2 TD
Ole Miss	Passing	Jaxson Dart	13–24, 154 yards, 2 TD
Ole Miss	Rushing	Quinshon Judkins	27 carries, 140 yards, 2 TD
Ole Miss	Receiving	Malik Heath	4 receptions, 75 yards, 1 TD

=== No. 7 Kentucky ===
Uniform Combination
Helmet	Jersey	Pants

No. 7 Kentucky Wildcats (4–0) at No. 14 Ole Miss Rebels (4–0)

Quarter	1	2	3	4	Total
No. 7 Wildcats	6	6	7	0	19
No. 14 Rebels	14	5	3	0	22

at Vaught–Hemingway Stadium • Oxford, MS

- Date: Saturday, October 1, 2022
- Game time: 11:00 a.m. CST
- Game weather: Sunny • Temperature: 72 °F (22 °C)
- Game attendance: 64,828
- Referee: David Smith
- TV announcers (ESPN):
  Sean McDonough (play-by-play)
  Todd Blackledge (color)
  Molly McGrath (sideline)
  Todd McShay (sideline)

Game information

First Quarter

- (7:09) Ole Miss – Zach Evans 4 yard run (Jonathan Cruz kick)
  Ole Miss 7–0; 6 plays, 65 yards, 1:40
- (0:59) Ole Miss – Quinshon Judkins 48 yard run (Jonathan Cruz kick)
  Ole Miss 14–0; 6 plays, 79 yards, 1:45
- (0:00) Kentucky – Chris Rodriguez Jr. 10 yard run (Matt Ruffolo kick blocked)
  Ole Miss 14–6; 2 plays, 15 yards, 0:47

Second Quarter

- (10:28) Ole Miss – Team safety
  Ole Miss 16–6
- (7:03) Ole Miss – Jonathan Cruz 53 yard field goal
  Ole Miss 19–6; 10 plays, 28 yards, 3:20
- (1:23) Kentucky – Tayvion Robinson 5 yard pass from Will Levis (Two-point conversion failed)
  Ole Miss 19–12; 9 plays, 70 yards, 5:34

Third Quarter

- (6:22) Kentucky – Jordan Dingle 17 yard pass from Will Levis (Matt Ruffolo kick)
  Tied 19–19; 8 plays, 49 yards, 5:08
- (2:19) Ole Miss – Jonathan Cruz 26 yard field goal
  Ole Miss 22–19; 13 plays, 57 yards, 4:03

Fourth Quarter

- No scoring plays

Statistics	UK	MISS
First downs	17	19
Total yards	328	399
Rushes/yards	37/108	39/186
Passing yards	220	213
Passing: Comp–Att–Int	18–24–0	15–29–1
Time of possession	36:53	23:07

Team	Category	Player	Statistics
Kentucky	Passing	Will Levis	18–24, 220 yards, 2 TD
Kentucky	Rushing	Chris Rodriguez Jr.	19 carries, 72 yards, 1 TD
Kentucky	Receiving	Barion Brown	2 receptions, 81 yards
Ole Miss	Passing	Jaxson Dart	15–29, 213 yards, 1 INT
Ole Miss	Rushing	Quinshon Judkins	15 carries, 106 yards, 1 TD
Ole Miss	Receiving	Malik Heath	6 receptions, 100 yards

=== At Vanderbilt ===
Uniform Combination
Helmet	Jersey	Pants

No. 9 Ole Miss Rebels (5–0) at Vanderbilt Commodores (3–2)

Quarter	1	2	3	4	Total
No. 9 Rebels	3	14	21	14	52
Commodores	3	17	0	8	28

at FirstBank Stadium • Nashville, TN

- Date: Saturday, October 8, 2022
- Game time: 3:00 p.m. CST (4:00 p.m. local EST)
- Game weather: Sunny • Temperature: 62 °F (17 °C)
- Game attendance: 31,567
- Referee: Kyle Olson
- TV announcers (SECN):
  Drew Carter (play-by-play)
  Matt Stinchcomb (color)
  Alyssa Lang (sideline)

Game information

First Quarter

- (11:17) Ole Miss – Jonathan Cruz 35 yard field goal
  Ole Miss 3–0; 13 plays, 62 yards, 3:39
- (6:08) Vanderbilt – Joseph Bulovas 23 yard field goal
  Tied 3–3; 11 plays, 56 yards, 5:03

Second Quarter

- (13:35) Vanderbilt – Jayden McGowan 36 yard pass from AJ Swann (Joseph Bulovas kick)
  Vanderbilt 10–3; 7 plays, 68 yards, 3:34
- (11:22) Vanderbilt – Joseph Bulovas 34 yard field goal
  Vanderbilt 13–3; 6 plays, 28 yards, 1:53
- (10:26) Ole Miss – Jordan Watkins 61 yard pass from Jaxson Dart (Jonathan Cruz kick)
  Vanderbilt 13–10; 3 plays, 65 yards, 0:56
- (1:32) Vanderbilt – Ray Davis 5 yard run (Joseph Bulovas kick)
  Vanderbilt 20–10; 15 plays, 75 yards, 8:54
- (0:21) Ole Miss – Quinshon Judkins 2 yard run (Jonathan Cruz kick)
  Vanderbilt 20–17; 7 plays, 62 yards, 1:03

Third Quarter

- (9:57) Ole Miss – Zach Evans 24 yard run (Jonathan Cruz kick)
  Ole Miss 24–20; 7 plays, 83 yards, 1:41
- (8:29) Ole Miss – Quinshon Judkins 6 yard run (Jonathan Cruz kick)
  Ole Miss 31–20; 1 play, 6 yards, 0:04
- (6:30) Ole Miss – Jonathan Mingo 71 yard pass from Jaxson Dart (Jonathan Cruz kick)
  Ole Miss 38–20; 1 play, 71 yards, 0:10

Fourth Quarter

- (6:49) Ole Miss – Jonathan Mingo 72 yard pass from Jaxson Dart (Jonathan Cruz kick)
  Ole Miss 45–20; 1 play, 72 yards, 0:14
- (4:03) Vanderbilt – Will Sheppard 9 yard pass from AJ Swann (AJ Swann pass to Ben Bresnahan for two-point conversion)
  Ole Miss 45–28; 6 plays, 74 yards, 2:40
- (0:18) Ole Miss – Matt Jones 1 yard run (Jonathan Cruz kick)
  Ole Miss 52–28; 8 plays, 44 yards, 3:43

Statistics	MISS	VAN
First downs	22	21
Total yards	589	403
Rushes/yards	28/141	40/122
Passing yards	448	281
Passing: Comp–Att–Int	25–32–2	27–38–0
Time of possession	18:43	41:17

Team	Category	Player	Statistics
Ole Miss	Passing	Jaxson Dart	25–32, 448 yards, 3 TD, 2 INT
Ole Miss	Rushing	Zach Evans	11 carries, 80 yards, 1 TD
Ole Miss	Receiving	Jonathan Mingo	9 receptions, 247 yards, 2 TD
Vanderbilt	Passing	AJ Swann	27–38, 281 yards, 2 TD
Vanderbilt	Rushing	Ray Davis	27 carries, 105 yards, 1 TD
Vanderbilt	Receiving	Jayden McGowan	7 receptions, 104 yards, 1 TD

=== Auburn ===
Uniform Combination
Helmet	Jersey	Pants

Auburn Tigers (3–3) at No. 9 Ole Miss Rebels (6–0)

Quarter	1	2	3	4	Total
Tigers	0	17	14	3	34
No. 9 Rebels	14	14	10	10	48

at Vaught–Hemingway Stadium • Oxford, MS

- Date: Saturday, October 15, 2022
- Game time: 11:00 a.m. CST
- Game weather: Sunny • Temperature: 64 °F (18 °C)
- Game attendance: 65,243
- Referee: Ken Williamson
- TV announcers (ESPN):
  Bob Wischusen (play-by-play)
  Dan Orlovsky (color)
  Kris Budden (sideline)

Game information

First Quarter

- (6:42) Ole Miss – Dayton Wade 35 yard pass from Jaxson Dart (Jonathan Cruz kick)
  Ole Miss 7–0; 2 plays, 46 yards, 0:26
- (2:43) Ole Miss – Zach Evans 23 yard pass from Jaxson Dart (Jonathan Cruz kick)
  Ole Miss 14–0; 9 plays, 65 yards, 2:36

Second Quarter

- (14:36) Ole Miss – Zach Evans 3 yard run (Jonathan Cruz kick)
  Ole Miss 21–0; 5 plays, 22 yards, 1:33
- (10:22) Auburn – Robby Ashford 2 yard run (Anders Carlson kick)
  Ole Miss 21–7; 9 plays, 75 yards, 4:14
- (5:24) Auburn – Tank Bigsby 2 yard run (Anders Carlson kick)
  Ole Miss 21–14; 8 plays, 76 yards, 3:49
- (2:52) Ole Miss – Quinshon Judkins 7 yard pass from Jaxson Dart (Jonathan Cruz kick)
  Ole Miss 28–14; 7 plays, 60 yards, 2:32
- (0:00) Auburn – Anders Carlson 42 yard field goal
  Ole Miss 28–17; 4 plays, 8 yards, 1:13

Third Quarter

- (13:34) Auburn – Tank Bigsby 50 yard run (Anders Carlson kick)
  Ole Miss 28–24; 3 plays, 75 yards, 1:26
- (9:46) Ole Miss – Jonathan Cruz 23 yard field goal
  Ole Miss 31–24; 13 plays, 73 yards, 3:48
- (6:40) Ole Miss – Quinshon Judkins 5 yard run (Jonathan Cruz kick)
  Ole Miss 38–24; 9 plays, 54 yards, 3:06
- (2:30) Auburn – Robby Ashford 11 yard run (Anders Carlson kick)
  Ole Miss 38–31; 8 plays, 75 yards, 4:10

Fourth Quarter

- (12:28) Ole Miss – Jonathan Cruz 42 yard field goal
  Ole Miss 41–31; 15 plays, 52 yards, 5:02
- (9:05) Auburn – Anders Carlson 28 yard field goal
  Ole Miss 41–34; 7 plays, 64 yards, 3:23
- (6:26) Ole Miss – Quinshon Judkins 41 yard run (Jonathan Cruz kick)
  Ole Miss 48–34; 8 plays, 75 yards, 2:39

Statistics	AUB	MISS
First downs	18	29
Total yards	441	578
Rushes/yards	48/301	69/448
Passing yards	140	130
Passing: Comp–Att–Int	8–17–2	9–19–1
Time of possession	30:27	29:33

Team	Category	Player	Statistics
Auburn	Passing	Robby Ashford	8–17, 140 yards, 2 INT
Auburn	Rushing	Tank Bigsby	20 carries, 179 yards, 2 TD
Auburn	Receiving	Koy Moore	1 reception, 46 yards
Ole Miss	Passing	Jaxson Dart	9–19, 130 yards, 3 TD, 1 INT
Ole Miss	Rushing	Quinshon Judkins	25 carries, 139 yards, 2 TD
Ole Miss	Receiving	Dayton Wade	2 receptions, 44 yards, 1 TD

=== At LSU ===
Uniform Combination
Helmet	Jersey	Pants

No. 7 Ole Miss Rebels (7–0) at LSU Tigers (5–2)

Quarter	1	2	3	4	Total
No. 7 Rebels	14	6	0	0	20
Tigers	3	14	7	21	45

at Tiger Stadium • Baton Rouge, LA

- Date: Saturday, October 22, 2022
- Game time: 2:30 p.m. CST
- Game weather: Sunny • Temperature: 80 °F (27 °C)
- Game attendance: 100,821
- Referee: Jason Autrey
- TV announcers (CBS):
  Brad Nessler (play-by-play)
  Gary Danielson (color)
  Jenny Dell (sideline)

Game information

First Quarter

- (13:23) Ole Miss – Quinshon Judkins 6 yard run (Jonathan Cruz kick)
  Ole Miss 7–0; 5 plays, 75 yards, 1:37
- (8:44) LSU – Damian Ramos 23 yard field goal
  Ole Miss 7–3; 12 plays, 69 yards, 4:39
- (6:01) Ole Miss – Quinshon Judkins 3 yard run (Jonathan Cruz kick)
  Ole Miss 14–3; 10 plays, 75 yards, 2:43

Second Quarter

- (14:57) Ole Miss – Jonathan Cruz 32 yard field goal
  Ole Miss 17–3; 9 plays, 61 yards, 2:57
- (12:11) LSU – Jaray Jenkins 34 yard pass from Jayden Daniels (Damian Ramos kick)
  Ole Miss 17–10; 5 plays, 75 yards, 2:46
- (8:20) LSU – Jayden Daniels 3 yard run (Damian Ramos kick)
  Tied 17–17; 7 plays, 78 yards, 3:02
- (4:08) Ole Miss – Jonathan Cruz 48 yard field goal
  Ole Miss 20–17; 11 plays, 45 yards, 4:12

Third Quarter

- (8:25) LSU – Mason Taylor 1 yard pass from Jayden Daniels (Damian Ramos kick)
  LSU 24–20; 10 plays, 50 yards, 3:58

Fourth Quarter

- (14:18) LSU – Jayden Daniels 11 yard run (Damian Ramos kick)
  LSU 31–20; 10 plays, 80 yards, 4:45
- (8:36) LSU – Jayden Daniels 17 yard run (Damian Ramos kick)
  LSU 38–20; 7 plays, 80 yards, 3:05
- (2:05) LSU – Josh Williams 1 yard run (Damian Ramos kick)
  LSU 45–20; 8 plays, 38 yards, 5:31

Statistics	MISS	LSU
First downs	24	35
Total yards	404	500
Rushes/yards	37/117	48/252
Passing yards	287	248
Passing: Comp–Att–Int	20–35–1	21–28–0
Time of possession	23:41	36:19

Team	Category	Player	Statistics
Ole Miss	Passing	Jaxson Dart	19–34, 283 yards, 1 INT
Ole Miss	Rushing	Quinshon Judkins	25 carries, 111 yards, 2 TD
Ole Miss	Receiving	Malik Heath	8 receptions, 145 yards
LSU	Passing	Jayden Daniels	21–28, 248 yards, 2 TD
LSU	Rushing	Jayden Daniels	23 carries, 121 yards, 3 TD
LSU	Receiving	Jaray Jenkins	2 receptions, 51 yards, 1 TD

=== At Texas A&M ===
Uniform Combination
Helmet	Jersey	Pants

No. 15 Ole Miss Rebels (7–1) at Texas A&M Aggies (3–4)

Quarter	1	2	3	4	Total
No. 15 Rebels	7	3	14	7	31
Aggies	14	0	0	14	28

at Kyle Field • College Station, TX

- Date: Saturday, October 29, 2022
- Game time: 6:30 p.m. CST
- Game weather: Cloudy • Temperature: 62 °F (17 °C)
- Game attendance: 101,064
- Referee: Matt Loeffler
- TV announcers (SECN):
  Tom Hart (play-by-play)
  Jordan Rodgers (color)
  Cole Cubelic (sideline)

Game information

First Quarter

- (13:02) Ole Miss – Dayton Wade 18 yard pass from Jaxson Dart (Jonathan Cruz kick)
  Ole Miss 7–0; 7 plays, 75 yards, 1:52
- (9:37) Texas A&M – Moose Muhammad III 3 yard pass from Conner Weigman (Randy Bond kick)
  Tied 7–7; 8 plays, 77 yards, 3:31
- (4:16) Texas A&M – Evan Stewart 15 yard pass from Conner Weigman (Randy Bond kick)
  Texas A&M 14–7; 6 plays, 81 yards, 2:56

Second Quarter

- (3:33) Ole Miss – Jonathan Cruz 46 yard field goal
  Texas A&M 14–10; 15 plays, 62 yards, 5:37

Third Quarter

- (8:00) Ole Miss – Casey Kelly 1 yard pass from Jaxson Dart (Jonathan Cruz kick)
  Ole Miss 17–14; 13 plays, 94 yards, 5:43
- (1:02) Ole Miss – Jonathan Mingo 2 yard pass from Jaxson Dart (Jonathan Cruz kick)
  Ole Miss 24–14; 8 plays, 85 yards, 2:26

Fourth Quarter

- (9:11) Texas A&M – Noah Thomas 2 yard pass from Conner Weigman (Randy Bond kick)
  Ole Miss 24–21; 6 plays, 62 yards, 2:57
- (7:18) Ole Miss – Quinshon Judkins 1 yard run (Jonathan Cruz kick)
  Ole Miss 31–21; 4 plays, 75 yards, 1:53
- (1:25) Texas A&M – De’Von Achane 7 yard pass from Conner Weigman (Randy Bond kick)
  Ole Miss 31–28; 10 plays, 80 yards, 1:56

Statistics	MISS	TA&M
First downs	26	26
Total yards	530	480
Rushes/yards	63/390	29/142
Passing yards	140	338
Passing: Comp–Att–Int	13–20–0	28–44–0
Time of possession	31:47	28:13

Team	Category	Player	Statistics
Ole Miss	Passing	Jaxson Dart	13–20, 140 yards, 3 TD
Ole Miss	Rushing	Quinshon Judkins	34 carries, 205 yards, 1 TD
Ole Miss	Receiving	Jonathan Mingo	4 receptions, 89 yards, 1 TD
Texas A&M	Passing	Conner Weigman	28–44, 338 yards, 4 TD
Texas A&M	Rushing	De’Von Achane	25 carries, 138 yards
Texas A&M	Receiving	Moose Muhammad III	8 receptions, 112 yards, 1 TD

=== No. 9 Alabama ===
Uniform Combination
Helmet	Jersey	Pants

No. 9 Alabama Crimson Tide (7–2) at No. 11 Ole Miss Rebels (8–1)

Quarter	1	2	3	4	Total
No. 9 Crimson Tide	0	14	10	6	30
No. 11 Rebels	7	10	7	0	24

at Vaught–Hemingway Stadium • Oxford, MS

- Date: Saturday, November 12, 2022
- Game time: 2:30 p.m. CST
- Game weather: Cloudy • Temperature: 39 °F (4 °C)
- Game attendance: 65,923
- Referee: Matt Loeffler
- TV announcers (CBS):
  Brad Nessler (play-by-play)
  Gary Danielson (color)
  Jenny Dell (sideline)

Game information

First Quarter

- (1:43) Ole Miss – Quinshon Judkins 1 yard run (Jonathan Cruz kick)
  Ole Miss 7–0; 11 plays, 68 yards, 4:20

Second Quarter

- (12:07) Ole Miss – Jonathan Cruz 22 yard field goal
  Ole Miss 10–0; 9 plays, 32 yards, 2:53
- (8:55) Alabama – Jermaine Burton 19 yard pass from Bryce Young (Will Reichard kick)
  Ole Miss 10–7; 7 plays, 80 yards, 3:06
- (5:09) Ole Miss – Quinshon Judkins 1 yard run (Jonathan Cruz kick)
  Ole Miss 17–7; 7 plays, 51 yards, 2:43
- (0:08) Alabama – Cameron Latu 8 yard pass from Bryce Young (Will Reichard kick)
  Ole Miss 17–14; 6 plays, 23 yards, 2:15

Third Quarter

- (12:31) Alabama – Will Reichard 39 yard field goal
  Tied 17–17; 7 plays, 54 yards, 2:29
- (7:28) Ole Miss – Jonathan Mingo 3 yard pass from Jaxson Dart (Jonathan Cruz kick)
  Ole Miss 24–17; 11 plays, 75 yards, 5:03
- (1:23) Alabama – Ja'Corey Brooks 5 yard pass from Bryce Young (Will Reichard kick)
  Tied 24–24; 14 plays, 75 yards, 6:05

Fourth Quarter

- (11:19) Alabama – Will Reichard 23 yard field goal
  Alabama 27–24; 8 plays, 44 yards, 2:52
- (2:23) Alabama – Will Reichard 49 yard field goal
  Alabama 30–24; 9 plays, 28 yards, 4:04

Statistics	ALA	MISS
First downs	18	22
Total yards	317	403
Rushes/yards	36/108	49/191
Passing yards	209	212
Passing: Comp–Att–Int	21–33–0	18–32–0
Time of possession	31:23	28:37

Team	Category	Player	Statistics
Alabama	Passing	Bryce Young	21–33, 209 yards, 3 TD
Alabama	Rushing	Jase McClellan	19 carries, 87 yards
Alabama	Receiving	Ja'Corey Brooks	4 receptions, 61 yards, 1 TD
Ole Miss	Passing	Jaxson Dart	18–31, 212 yards, 1 TD
Ole Miss	Rushing	Quinshon Judkins	25 carries, 142 yards, 2 TD
Ole Miss	Receiving	Malik Heath	6 receptions, 123 yards

=== At Arkansas ===
Uniform Combination
Helmet	Jersey	Pants

No. 14 Ole Miss Rebels (8–2) at Arkansas Razorbacks (5–5)

Quarter	1	2	3	4	Total
No. 14 Rebels	3	3	0	21	27
Razorbacks	14	21	7	0	42

at Donald W. Reynolds Razorback Stadium • Fayetteville, AR

- Date: Saturday, November 19, 2022
- Game time: 6:30 p.m. CST
- Game weather: Clear Skies • Temperature: 34 °F (1 °C)
- Game attendance: 71,365
- Referee: Ken Williamson
- TV announcers (SECN):
  Tom Hart (play-by-play)
  Jordan Rodgers (color)
  Cole Cubelic (sideline)

Game information

First Quarter

- (8:28) Arkansas – Matt Landers 8 yard pass from KJ Jefferson (Cam Little kick)
  Arkansas 7–0; 7 plays, 69 yards, 2:26
- (3:44) Arkansas – Matt Landers 23 yard pass from KJ Jefferson (Cam Little kick)
  Arkansas 14–0; 8 plays, 73 yards, 1:51
- (2:00) Ole Miss – Jonathan Cruz 45 yard field goal
  Arkansas 14–3; 5 plays, 48 yards, 1:44

Second Quarter

- (14:03) Arkansas – Ketron Jackson Jr. 20 yard pass from KJ Jefferson (Cam Little kick)
  Arkansas 21–3; 7 plays, 75 yards, 2:57
- (4:38) Ole Miss – Jonathan Cruz 32 yard field goal
  Arkansas 21–6; 9 plays, 56 yards, 4:17
- (2:20) Arkansas – Raheim Sanders 20 yard run (Cam Little kick)
  Arkansas 28–6; 7 plays, 75 yards, 2:18
- (0:05) Arkansas – Raheim Sanders 8 yard run (Cam Little kick)
  Arkansas 35–6; 6 plays, 48 yards, 1:02

Third Quarter

- (14:16) Arkansas – Raheim Sanders 68 yard run (Cam Little kick)
  Arkansas 42–6; 2 plays, 75 yards, 0:44

Fourth Quarter

- (14:02) Ole Miss – Quinshon Judkins 1 yard run (Two-point conversion failed)
  Arkansas 42–12; 9 plays, 96 yards, 2:42
- (8:02) Ole Miss – Zach Evans 48 yard run (Jaxson Dart pass to Jonathan Mingo for two-point conversion)
  Arkansas 42–20; 5 plays, 88 yards, 1:50
- (2:55) Ole Miss – Malik Heath 13 yard pass from Jaxson Dart (Jonathan Cruz kick)
  Arkansas 42–27; 12 plays, 86 yards, 3:21

Statistics	MISS	ARK
First downs	32	24
Total yards	703	503
Rushes/yards	53/463	43/335
Passing yards	240	168
Passing: Comp–Att–Int	21–36–1	17–22–0
Time of possession	30:10	29:50

Team	Category	Player	Statistics
Ole Miss	Passing	Jaxson Dart	21–36, 240 yards, 1 TD, 1 INT
Ole Miss	Rushing	Quinshon Judkins	24 carries, 214 yards, 1 TD
Ole Miss	Receiving	Malik Heath	9 receptions, 140 yards, 1 TD
Arkansas	Passing	KJ Jefferson	17–22, 168 yards, 3 TD
Arkansas	Rushing	Raheim Sanders	24 carries, 232 yards, 3 TD
Arkansas	Receiving	Matt Landers	3 receptions, 38 yards, 2 TD

=== Mississippi State ===
Uniform Combination
Helmet	Jersey	Pants

Mississippi State Bulldogs (7–4) at No. 20 Ole Miss Rebels (8–3)

Quarter	1	2	3	4	Total
Bulldogs	7	7	0	10	24
No. 20 Rebels	6	10	0	6	22

at Vaught–Hemingway Stadium • Oxford, MS

- Date: Thursday, November 24, 2022
- Game time: 6:00 p.m. CST
- Game weather: Cloudy • Temperature: 60 °F (16 °C)
- Game attendance: 62,487
- Referee: David Smith
- TV announcers (ESPN):
  Matt Barrie (play-by-play)
  Louis Riddick (color)
  Harry Lyles, Jr. (sideline)

Game information

First Quarter

- (12:16) Ole Miss – Jonathan Cruz 32 yard field goal
  Ole Miss 3–0; 7 plays, 51 yards, 2:44
- (8:17) Mississippi State – Jo'Quavious Marks 1 yard run (Massimo Biscardi kick)
  Mississippi State 7–3; 10 plays, 61 yards, 3:50
- (1:33) Ole Miss – Jonathan Cruz 33 yard field goal
  Mississippi State 7–6; 12 plays, 58 yards, 4:00

Second Quarter

- (12:04) Ole Miss – Jonathan Cruz 49 yard field goal
  Ole Miss 9–7; 6 plays, 28 yards, 2:05
- (1:55) Ole Miss – J.J. Pegues 1 yard pass from Jaxson Dart (Jonathan Cruz kick)
  Ole Miss 16–7; 13 plays, 64 yards, 4:53
- (0:08) Mississippi State – Lideatrick Griffin 19 yard pass from Will Rogers (Massimo Biscardi kick)
  Ole Miss 16–14; 12 plays, 75 yards, 1:47

Third Quarter

- No scoring plays

Fourth Quarter

- (13:46) Mississippi State – Massimo Biscardi 34 yard field goal
  Mississippi State 17–16; 13 plays, 78 yards, 6:39
- (7:58) Mississippi State – RaRa Thomas 22 yard pass from Will Rogers (Massimo Biscardi kick)
  Mississippi State 24–16; 8 plays, 55 yards, 4:01
- (1:33) Ole Miss – Dayton Wade 23 yard pass from Jaxson Dart (Two-point conversion failed)
  Mississippi State 24–22; 15 plays, 99 yards, 3:23

Statistics	MSST	MISS
First downs	20	19
Total yards	336	335
Rushes/yards	37/97	39/78
Passing yards	239	257
Passing: Comp–Att–Int	27–40–1	31–39–0
Time of possession	32:22	27:38

Team	Category	Player	Statistics
Mississippi State	Passing	Will Rogers	27–39, 239 yards, 2 TD, 1 INT
Mississippi State	Rushing	Jo'Quavious Marks	14 carries, 76 yards, 1 TD
Mississippi State	Receiving	Lideatrick Griffin	2 receptions, 39 yards, 1 TD
Ole Miss	Passing	Jaxson Dart	30–38, 250 yards, 2 TD
Ole Miss	Rushing	Quinshon Judkins	22 carries, 91 yards
Ole Miss	Receiving	Dayton Wade	8 receptions, 88 yards, 1 TD

=== Vs. Texas Tech ===
Uniform Combination
Helmet	Jersey	Pants

Texas Tech Red Raiders (7–5) vs. Ole Miss Rebels (8–4)

Quarter	1	2	3	4	Total
Red Raiders	10	16	0	16	42
Rebels	7	0	6	12	25

at NRG Stadium • Houston, TX

- Date: Wednesday, December 28, 2022
- Game time: 8:00 p.m. CST
- Game weather: None (retractable roof closed)
- Game attendance: 53,251
- Referee: Stuart Mullins
- TV announcers (ESPN):
  Roy Philpott (play-by-play)
  Andre Ware (color)
  Ian Fitzsimmons (sideline)

Game information

First Quarter

- (6:43) Texas Tech – Tyler Shough 2 yard run (Trey Wolff kick)
  Texas Tech 7–0; 7 plays, 27 yards, 2:30
- (5:26) Ole Miss – Zach Evans 8 yard run (Jonathan Cruz kick)
  Tied 7–7; 5 plays, 75 yards, 1:17
- (3:23) Texas Tech – Trey Wolff 42 yard field goal
  Texas Tech 10–7; 7 plays, 49 yards, 2:03

Second Quarter

- (6:59) Texas Tech – Tyler Shough 2 yard run (Trey Wolff kick)
  Texas Tech 17–7; 4 plays, 9 yards, 1:03
- (2:13) Texas Tech – Trey Wolff 42 yard field goal
  Texas Tech 20–7; 8 plays, 18 yards, 4:11
- (0:28) Texas Tech – Jerand Bradley 12 yard pass from Tyler Shough (Two-point conversion failed)
  Texas Tech 26–7; 5 plays, 37 yards, 1:14

Third Quarter

- (9:08) Ole Miss – Jordan Watkins 11 yard pass from Jaxson Dart (Jonathan Cruz kick missed)
  Texas Tech 26–13; 10 plays, 80 yards, 3:40

Fourth Quarter

- (13:20) Texas Tech – SaRodorick Thompson 1 yard run (Two-point conversion failed)
  Texas Tech 32–13; 11 plays, 71 yards, 3:35
- (9:36) Texas Tech – Trey Wolff 26 yard field goal
  Texas Tech 35–13; 7 plays, 66 yards, 2:27
- (7:35) Ole Miss – Jaxson Dart 9 yard run (Two-point conversion failed)
  Texas Tech 35–19; 7 plays, 75 yards, 2:01
- (3:10) Ole Miss – Malik Heath 19 yard pass from Jaxson Dart (Two-point conversion failed)
  Texas Tech 35–25; 9 plays, 80 yards, 2:30
- (3:03) Texas Tech – Loic Fouonji 44 yard kickoff return (Trey Wolff kick)
  Texas Tech 42–25

Statistics	TTU	MISS
First downs	27	27
Total yards	484	558
Rushes/yards	48/242	43/197
Passing yards	242	361
Passing: Comp–Att–Int	24–40–1	25–41–3
Time of possession	33:24	26:36

Team	Category	Player	Statistics
Texas Tech	Passing	Tyler Shough	24–39, 242 yards, 1 TD, 1 INT
Texas Tech	Rushing	Tyler Shough	25 carries, 111 yards, 2 TD
Texas Tech	Receiving	Loic Fouonji	7 receptions, 100 yards
Ole Miss	Passing	Jaxson Dart	25–41, 361 yards, 2 TD, 3 INT
Ole Miss	Rushing	Quinshon Judkins	23 carries, 91 yards
Ole Miss	Receiving	Malik Heath	8 receptions, 137 yards, 1 TD

== Cumulative Season Statistics ==
=== Cumulative Team Statistics ===
Category	Ole Miss	Opponents
First downs - Avg. per game	325 - 25	277 - 21.31
Points - Avg. per game	435 - 33.46	332 - 25.54
Total plays/yards - Avg. per game	1001/6453 (6.45 yards/play) - 77/496.38	947/5042 (5.32 yards/play) - 72.85/387.85
Passing yards - Avg. per game	3117 - 239.77	2858 - 219.85
Rushes/yards (net) - Avg. per game	614/3336 - 47.23/256.62 (5.43 yards/carry)	516/2184 - 39.69/168 (4.23 yards/carry)
Passing (Att-Comp-Int)	387-239-12 (61.76% completion)	431-274-8 (63.57% completion)
Sacks - Avg. per game	35 - 2.69	16 - 1.23
Penalties/yards - Avg. per game	89/826 - 6.85/63.54	77/612 - 5.92/47.08
3rd down conversions	88–187 (47.06%)	76–196 (38.78%)
4th down conversions	17–35 (48.57%)	17–36 (47.22%)
Time of possession - Avg. per game	5:43:17 - 26:24	7:16:43 - 33:36

=== Cumulative Player Statistics ===
Category	Player	Statistics - Avg. per game
Leading Passer	Jaxson Dart	226–362 (62.43% completion), 2974 yards, 20 TD, 11 INT - 17.38–27.85, 228.77 yards, 1.54 TD, 0.85 INT
Leading Rusher	Quinshon Judkins	274 carries, 1567 yards, 16 TD - 21.08 carries, 120.54 yards (5.72 yards/carry), 1.23 TD
Leading Receiver	Malik Heath	60 receptions, 971 yards, 5 TD - 4.62 receptions, 74.69 yards, 0.38 TD

== Coaching staff ==
Coach	Title	Year at Ole Miss	Previous job
Lane Kiffin	Head Coach	3rd	Florida Atlantic
Charlie Weis Jr.	OC/QB	1st	South Florida (OC/QB)
Chris Partridge	DC/S	3rd	Michigan (S/STC)
Randall Joyner	DL	2nd	SMU (DL)
Sam Carter	CB	1st	Arkansas (CB)
Jake Thornton	OL	2nd	Gardner–Webb (OL)
John David Baker	TE/PGC	2nd	USC (TE)
Marty Biagi	STC	1st	Purdue (STC)
Derrick Nix	WR	15th	Atlanta Falcons (OA)
Marquel Blackwell	RB	1st	Houston (RB)

== Rankings ==
Ranking movements Legend: ██ Increase in ranking ██ Decrease in ranking — = Not ranked RV = Received votes
	Week															
Poll	Pre	1	2	3	4	5	6	7	8	9	10	11	12	13	14	Final
AP	21	22	20	16	14	9	9	7	15	11	11	14	20	RV	RV	—
Coaches	24	23	17	13	11	9	9	7	12	10	9	14	19	RV	RV	RV
CFP	Not released									11	11	14	20	—	—	Not released
