= 2022 Texas Bowl (December) =

Postseason college football bowl game

2022 TaxAct Texas Bowl
- 16th Texas Bowl
Texas Tech Red Raiders	Ole Miss Rebels
(7–5)	(8–4)
Big 12	SEC
42	25
Head coach: Joey McGuire	Head coach: Lane Kiffin
	1	2	3	4	Total
Texas Tech	10	16	0	16	42
Ole Miss	7	0	6	12	25
- Date: December 28, 2022
- Season: 2022
- Stadium: NRG Stadium
- Location: Houston, Texas
- MVP: Tyler Shough (QB, Texas Tech)
- Favorite: Ole Miss by 3.5
- Referee: Stuart Mullins (ACC)
- Attendance: 53,251
- Payout: US$6,400,000

United States TV coverage
- Network: ESPN
- Announcers: Roy Philpott (play-by-play), Andre Ware (analyst), and Ian Fitzsimmons (sideline)

International TV coverage
- Network: ESPN Deportes

The 2022 Texas Bowl was a college football bowl game played on December 28, 2022, at NRG Stadium in Houston, Texas. The 16th annual Texas Bowl, the game featured Texas Tech from the Big 12 Conference and Ole Miss from the Southeastern Conference (SEC). The game began at 8:09 p.m. CST and was aired on ESPN. It was one of the 2022–23 bowl games concluding the 2022 FBS football season. Sponsored by tax preparation software company TaxAct, the game was officially known as the TaxAct Texas Bowl.

== Teams ==
Consistent with conference tie-ins, the game featured teams from the Big 12 Conference and the Southeastern Conference (SEC).

This was the seventh meeting between Texas Tech and Ole Miss, with their most recent prior meeting coming in 2018. Coming into the bowl, the Rebels led the all-time series 4–2. This was the fourth bowl game played between the two teams—they met in the 1986 Independence Bowl, 1998 Independence Bowl, and 2009 Cotton Bowl Classic; all three match-ups ended in a victory for Ole Miss.

=== Texas Tech ===
Texas Tech, from the Big 12, finished the regular season with a record of 7–5, led by first-year head coach Joey McGuire. Highlights of the season included finishing with a winning conference record (5–4) for the first time since 2009 and defeating Texas and Oklahoma in the same season for the first time in program history. This was the Red Raiders' third Texas Bowl appearance, having won the 2012 edition, 34–31, to Minnesota and losing the 2015 edition, 27–56, to LSU. Texas Tech began the game in air raid formation as a tribute to former head coach Mike Leach.

=== Ole Miss ===
Ole Miss, from the SEC, finished the regular season with a record of 8–4, led by third-year head coach Lane Kiffin. The team started the season 7–0, but lost four of their next five games. This was the Rebels' first Texas Bowl appearance.

== Game summary ==
2022 TaxAct Texas Bowl

Quarter	1	2	3	4	Total
Texas Tech	10	16	0	16	42
Ole Miss	7	0	6	12	25

at NRG Stadium • Houston, Texas

- Date: Wednesday, December 28, 2022
- Game time: 8:00 p.m. CST
- Game weather: None (retractable roof closed)
- Game attendance: 53,251
- Referee: Stuart Mullins
- TV announcers (ESPN): Roy Philpott (play-by-play), Andre Ware (analyst), and Ian Fitzsimmons (sideline)
- Box score

Scoring summary

Quarter	Time	Drive			Team	Scoring information	Score	
Quarter	Time	Plays	Yards	TOP	Team	Scoring information	Texas Tech	Ole Miss
1	6:43	7	27	2:30	Texas Tech	Tyler Shough 2-yard touchdown run, Trey Wolff kick good	7	0
1	5:26	5	75	1:17	Ole Miss	Zach Evans 8-yard touchdown run, Jonathan Cruz kick good	7	7
1	3:23	7	49	1:56	Texas Tech	42-yard field goal by Trey Wolff	10	7
2	6:59	4	9	1:03	Texas Tech	Tyler Shough 2-yard touchdown run, Trey Wolff kick good	17	7
2	2:13	8	18	4:11	Texas Tech	32-yard field goal by Trey Wolff	20	7
2	0:28	5	37	1:14	Texas Tech	Jerand Bradley 12-yard touchdown reception from Tyler Shough, 2-point pass failed	26	7
3	9:08	10	80	3:40	Ole Miss	Jordan Watkins 11-yard touchdown reception from Jaxson Dart, Jonathan Cruz kick no good	26	13
4	13:20	11	71	3:35	Texas Tech	SaRodorick Thompson 1-yard touchdown run, 2-point rush failed	32	13
4	9:36	7	66	2:27	Texas Tech	26-yard field goal by Trey Wolff	35	13
4	7:35	7	75	2:01	Ole Miss	Jaxson Dart 9-yard touchdown run, 2-point pass failed	35	19
4	3:10	9	80	2:30	Ole Miss	Malik Heath 19-yard touchdown reception from Jaxson Dart, 2-point pass failed	35	25
4	3:03				Texas Tech	Kickoff returned 44 yards for touchdown by Loic Fouonji, Trey Wolff kick good	42	25
"TOP" = time of possession. For other American football terms, see Glossary of American football.							42	25

== Statistics ==
Team statistical comparison
Statistic	Texas Tech	Ole Miss
First downs	27	27
First downs rushing	11	12
First downs passing	11	14
First downs penalty	5	1
Third down efficiency	7–19	5–13
Fourth down efficiency	5–6	2–7
Total plays–net yards	88–484	84–558
Rushing attempts–net yards	48–242	43–197
Yards per rush	5.0	4.3
Yards passing	242	361
Pass completions–attempts	24–40	25–41
Interceptions thrown	1	3
Punt returns–total yards	1–38	1–43
Kickoff returns–total yards	9–564	5–210
Punts–average yardage	1–38.0	1–43.0
Fumbles–lost	3–2	2–2
Penalties–yards	3–15	8–86
Time of possession	33:24	26:36

Texas Tech statistics
Red Raiders passing
	C–A	Yds	TD–INT
Tyler Shough	24–39	242	1–1
Behren Morton	0–1	0	0–0
Red Raiders rushing
	Car	Yds	TD
Tyler Shough	25	111	2
Tahj Brooks	14	90	0
Cam'Ron Valdez	1	29	0
SaRodorick Thompson	7	14	1
TEAM	1	–2	0
Red Raiders receiving
	Rec	Yds	TD
Loic Fouonji	7	100	0
Jerand Bradley	8	88	1
Myles Price	3	35	0
Xavier White	3	11	0
Brady Boyd	1	9	0
Henry Teeter	1	5	0
SaRodorick Thompson	1	–6	0

Ole Miss statistics
Rebels passing
	C–A	Yds	TD–INT
Jaxson Dart	25–41	361	2–3
Rebels rushing
	Car	Yds	TD
Quinshon Judkins	23	91	0
Jaxson Dart	11	66	1
Zach Evans	8	37	1
Dayton Wade	1	3	0
Rebels receiving
	Rec	Yds	TD
Malik Heath	8	137	1
Dayton Wade	3	73	0
Jonathan Mingo	3	53	0
Jordan Watkins	4	45	1
Zach Evans	4	26	0
Quinshon Judkins	2	16	0
Bralon Brown	1	11	0
