= 2022 Texas Tech Red Raiders football team =

American college football season

2022 Texas Tech Red Raiders football

Texas Bowl champion

Texas Bowl, W 42–25 vs. Ole Miss
- Conference: Big 12 Conference
- Record: 8–5 (5–4 Big 12)
- Head coach: Joey McGuire (1st season)
- Offensive coordinator: Zach Kittley (1st season)
- Offensive scheme: Air raid
- Defensive coordinator: Tim DeRuyter (1st season)
- Base defense: 3–4/3–3–5 hybrid
- Home stadium: Jones AT&T Stadium

2022 Big 12 Conference football standings
	Conf.			Overall
Team	W		L	W		L
No. 2 TCU y^	9	–	0	13	–	2
No. 14 Kansas State y$	7	–	2	10	–	4
No. 25 Texas	6	–	3	8	–	5
Texas Tech	5	–	4	8	–	5
Oklahoma State	4	–	5	7	–	6
Baylor	4	–	5	6	–	7
Oklahoma	3	–	6	6	–	7
Kansas	3	–	6	6	–	7
West Virginia	3	–	6	5	–	7
Iowa State	1	–	8	4	–	8
Championship: Kansas State 31, TCU 28 ^{OT}
^ – College Football Playoff participant; $ – Conference champion; y – Championship game participant; Rankings from AP Poll

The 2022 Texas Tech Red Raiders football team represented Texas Tech University during the 2022 NCAA Division I FBS football season. The Red Raiders played their home games at Jones AT&T Stadium in Lubbock, Texas, and competed in the Big 12 Conference. They were led by first-year head coach Joey McGuire.

The Red Raiders finished the regular season 7–5, 5–4 in Big 12 play, for the program's first winning conference record since 2009. Additionally, Texas Tech defeated Texas and Oklahoma in the same season for the first time in program history. The Red Raiders were invited to the Texas Bowl, defeating Ole Miss 42–25. Defensive lineman Tyree Wilson was named All-Big 12 First Team and defensive back Malik Dunlap was named All-Big 12 Second Team.

== Offseason ==
=== Coaching changes ===
Following a 24–25 loss to Kansas State in the eighth week of the 2021 season, head coach Matt Wells was fired on October 25. Offensive coordinator and quarterbacks coach Sonny Cumbie was named interim head coach for the rest of the 2021 season. On November 8, Joey McGuire was hired as the Red Raider's new head coach, having previously been the associate head coach and outside linebackers coach for the Baylor Bears. On November 24, McGuire announced that he would be retaining Cumbie as offensive coordinator and quarterbacks coach. However, Cumbie was hired as the head coach at Louisiana Tech University on November 30. Running backs coach DeAndre Smith, father of quarterback Donovan Smith, was retained by McGuire. On December 5, Virginia Tech announced that it had hired co-defensive coordinator Derek Jones. The following day it was announced that head defensive coordinator Keith Patterson had been hired as the head coach at Abilene Christian. DeAndre Smith was later hired as the New York Giants' running backs coach on February 11, 2022.

=== Recruiting class ===
College recruiting
Name	Hometown	School	Height	Weight	Commit date
Joseph Adedire; Defensive line	Mansfield, TX	Mansfield Summit HS	6 ft 3 in (1.91 m)	250 lb (110 kg)	Dec 15, 2021
Joseph Adedire; Defensive line	Recruit ratings: Scout: Rivals: 247Sports: ESPN:				
Bryson Donnell; Running back	Tyler, TX	Tyler Legacy HS	5 ft 11 in (1.80 m)	204 lb (93 kg)	Dec 15, 2021
Bryson Donnell; Running back	Recruit ratings: Scout: Rivals: 247Sports: ESPN:				
Harvey Dyson; Defensive line	Cedar Hill, TX	Cedar Hill HS	6 ft 3 in (1.91 m)	260 lb (120 kg)	Dec 15, 2021
Harvey Dyson; Defensive line	Recruit ratings: Scout: Rivals: 247Sports: ESPN:				
Tavares Elston; Linebacker	Gulf Shores, AL	Gulf Shores HS	6 ft 0 in (1.83 m)	210 lb (95 kg)	Dec 15, 2021
Tavares Elston; Linebacker	Recruit ratings: Scout: Rivals: 247Sports: ESPN:				
Coy Eakin; Wide receiver	Stephenville, TX	Stephenville HS	6 ft 2 in (1.88 m)	185 lb (84 kg)	Jan 29, 2022
Coy Eakin; Wide receiver	Recruit ratings: Scout: Rivals: 247Sports: ESPN:				
Hut Graham; Safety	Gunter, TX	Gunter HS	6 ft 0.5 in (1.84 m)	175 lb (79 kg)	Dec 15, 2021
Hut Graham; Safety	Recruit ratings: Scout: Rivals: 247Sports: ESPN:				
Maurion Horn; Running back	Broken Arrow, OK	Broken Arrow HS	5 ft 11 in (1.80 m)	175 lb (79 kg)	Dec 15, 2021
Maurion Horn; Running back	Recruit ratings: Scout: Rivals: 247Sports: ESPN:				
Landon Hullaby; Safety	Mansfield, TX	Mansfield Timberview HS	6 ft 0 in (1.83 m)	185 lb (84 kg)	Dec 15, 2021
Landon Hullaby; Safety	Recruit ratings: Scout: Rivals: 247Sports: ESPN:				
Tyler King; Wide receiver	Houston, TX	Alief Taylor HS	5 ft 10 in (1.78 m)	160 lb (73 kg)	Dec 15, 2021
Tyler King; Wide receiver	Recruit ratings: Scout: Rivals: 247Sports: ESPN:				
Seth Martin; Offensive line	Fort Worth, TX	Everman HS	6 ft 3 in (1.91 m)	285 lb (129 kg)	Dec 15, 2021
Seth Martin; Offensive line	Recruit ratings: Scout: Rivals: 247Sports: ESPN:				
Syncere Massey; Defensive line	Cedar Hill, TX	Cedar Hill HS	6 ft 5 in (1.96 m)	280 lb (130 kg)	Dec 15, 2021
Syncere Massey; Defensive line	Recruit ratings: Scout: Rivals: 247Sports: ESPN:				
Trevon McAlpine; Defensive line	Saraland, AL	Saraland HS	6 ft 3 in (1.91 m)	280 lb (130 kg)	Dec 15, 2021
Trevon McAlpine; Defensive line	Recruit ratings: Scout: Rivals: 247Sports: ESPN:				
Sammy Morris IV; Defensive back	Prosper, TX	Prosper HS	6 ft 1 in (1.85 m)	190 lb (86 kg)	Feb 2, 2022
Sammy Morris IV; Defensive back	Recruit ratings: Scout: Rivals: 247Sports: ESPN:				
Jalon Peoples; Cornerback	Cedar Hill, TX	Cedar Hill HS	6 ft 0 in (1.83 m)	175 lb (79 kg)	Dec 15, 2021
Jalon Peoples; Cornerback	Recruit ratings: Scout: Rivals: 247Sports: ESPN:				
Ben Roberts; Linebacker	Haslet, TX	Eaton HS	6 ft 3 in (1.91 m)	200 lb (91 kg)	Dec 15, 2021
Ben Roberts; Linebacker	Recruit ratings: Scout: Rivals: 247Sports: ESPN:				
Sheridan Wilson; Offensive line	Argyle, TX	Argyle HS	6 ft 4 in (1.93 m)	275 lb (125 kg)	Dec 15, 2021
Sheridan Wilson; Offensive line	Recruit ratings: Scout: Rivals: 247Sports: ESPN:				

=== Transfers ===
Outgoing

Name	No.	Pos.	Height	Weight	Year	Hometown	New school
Henry Colombi	6	QB	6'2"	205	RS Senior	Hollywood, FL	Marshall
Sterling Galban	22	WR	5'11	180	RS Junior	Burnet, TX	Jacksonville State
Nelson Mbanasor	91	DL	6'3	275	RS Senior	Lufkin, TX	Louisiana Tech
Maverick McIvor	8	QB	6'3	215	RS Sophomore	San Angelo, TX	Abilene Christian

Incoming

Name	No.	Pos.	Height	Weight	Year	Hometown	Prev. school
Blake Bedwell	28	RB	5'10"	194	RS Freshman	Amarillo, TX	SMU
Brady Boyd	14	WR	6'1"	185	Freshman	Southlake, TX	Minnesota
Jordan Brown	18	WR	5'11"	185	Freshman	DeSoto, TX	Kansas
Cade Briggs	73	OL	6'3"	295	Sophomore	Las Vegas, NV	New Mexico
Ty Buchanan	75	OL	6'6	285	Freshman	Corpus Christi, TX	USC
Myles Cole	5	DE	6'6"	280	Senior	Shreveport, LA	Louisiana–Monroe
Baylor Cupp	88	TE	6'7	245	Sophomore	Brock, TX	Texas A&M
James Grando	11	LB	6'2"	205	Sophomore	Arlington, TX	Cisco J. C.
Drew Hocutt	83	WR	6'0"	190	RS Freshman	Lubbock, TX	Angelo State
Monroe Mills	71	OL	6'6"	300	RS Freshman	Columbia, MO	Oklahoma State
Dimitri Moore	3	LB	6'3"	208	Senior	Cedar Hill, TX	Missouri State
Joshua Moore	6	WR	6'1"	169	Sophomore	Yoakum, TX	Texas
Tyler Owens	44	S	6'2"	204	Junior	Plano, TX	Texas
Jacob Rodriguez	98	LB	6'1"	200	Freshman	Wichita Falls, TX	Virginia
Michael Shanahan	66	OT	6'5"	310	Sophomore	Orlando, FL	UT Martin
Haydon Wiginton	83	WR	5'11"	180	Freshman	Midloathian, TX	Oklahoma State
Dennis Wilburn	56	OL	6'3"	320	Sophomore	Humble, TX	Hutchinson C. C.

== Preseason ==
=== Big 12 media poll ===
The preseason poll was released on July 7, 2022.

Big 12 media poll
Predicted finish	Team	Votes (1st place)
1	Baylor	365 (17)
2	Oklahoma	354 (12)
3	Oklahoma State	342 (9)
4	Texas	289 (2)
5	Kansas State	261
6	Iowa State	180 (1)
7	TCU	149
8	West Virginia	147
9	Texas Tech	119
10	Kansas	48

=== Award watch lists ===
Listed in the order that they were released

Award	Player	Position	Year
John Mackey Award	Baylor Cupp	TE	JR
Outland Trophy	Cole Spencer	OT	SR
Ray Guy Award	Austin McNamara	P	SR
Paul Hornung Award	Myles Price	WR	JR
Wuerffel Trophy	Tony Bradford Jr.	DL	SR
Bednarik Award	Tyree Wilson	LB	SR
Earl Campbell Tyler Rose Award	Tahj Brooks	RB	JR
Earl Campbell Tyler Rose Award	Myles Price	WR	JR
Earl Campbell Tyler Rose Award	SaRodorick Thompson	RB	SR
Johnny Unitas Golden Arm Award	Tyler Shough	QB	SR
Rotary Lombardi Award	Tyree Wilson	OLB	SR

== Schedule ==
Texas Tech and the Big 12 announced the 2022 football schedule on December 1, 2021.

Date	Time	Opponent	Site	TV	Result	Attendance
September 3	7:00 p.m.	Murray State*	Jones AT&T Stadium; Lubbock, TX	ESPN+	W 63–10	60,201
September 10	3:00 p.m.	No. 25 Houston*	Jones AT&T Stadium; Lubbock, TX (rivalry)	FS1	W 33–30 ^{2OT}	56,271
September 17	6:00 p.m.	at No. 16 NC State*	Carter–Finley Stadium; Raleigh, NC	ESPN2	L 14–27	56,919
September 24	2:30 p.m.	No. 22 Texas	Jones AT&T Stadium; Lubbock, TX (rivalry)	ESPN	W 37–34 ^{OT}	60,975
October 1	11:00 a.m.	at No. 25 Kansas State	Bill Snyder Family Football Stadium; Manhattan, KS	ESPN+	L 28–37	50,782
October 8	2:30 p.m.	at No. 7 Oklahoma State	Boone Pickens Stadium; Stillwater, OK	FS1	L 31–41	55,509
October 22	2:00 p.m.	West Virginia^{†}	Jones AT&T Stadium; Lubbock, TX	FS1	W 48–10	56,530
October 29	6:30 p.m.	Baylor	Jones AT&T Stadium; Lubbock, TX (rivalry)	ESPN2	L 17–45	60,705
November 5	11:00 a.m.	at No. 7 TCU	Amon G. Carter Stadium; Fort Worth, TX (rivalry)	Fox	L 24–34	44,760
November 12	6:00 p.m.	Kansas	Jones AT&T Stadium; Lubbock, TX	ESPN+	W 43–28	55,613
November 19	6:00 p.m.	at Iowa State	Jack Trice Stadium; Ames, IA	FS1	W 14–10	52,676
November 26	6:30 p.m.	Oklahoma	Jones AT&T Stadium; Lubbock, TX	FS1	W 51–48 ^{OT}	51,126
December 28	8:00 p.m.	vs. Ole Miss*	NRG Stadium; Houston, TX (Texas Bowl)	ESPN	W 42–25	53,251
*Non-conference game; ^{†}Homecoming; Rankings from AP Poll (and CFP Rankings, after November 1) - Released prior to game; All times are in Central time

Schedule source:

== Personnel ==
2022 Texas Tech Red Raiders football team roster
Players
Coaches
Offense

Pos.	#	Name	Class
TE	47	Tanner Allen	Fr
RB	25	Blake Bedwell	So
WR	13	Brady Boyd	So
WR	9	Jerand Bradley	Fr
OL	73	Cade Briggs	Sr
RB	28	Tahj Brooks (C)	Jr
WR	86	Jordan Brown	So
OL	79	Ty Buchanan	Fr
WR	15	Cameron Cantrell (injured)	Jr
OL	77	Ethan Carde	Sr
WR	10	Trey Cleveland	Jr
TE	88	Baylor Cupp	Jr
RB	22	Bryson Donnell	Fr
WR	85	Coy Eakin	Fr
WR	83	Jack Esparza	Fr
WR	17	Nate Floyd	So
WR	19	Loic Fouonji	Jr
OL	63	Erik Gray	Fr
WR	82	Drew Hocutt	So
OL	75	Jacoby Jackson	Fr
OL	66	Matt Keeler	So
WR	21	Tyler King	Fr
TE	26	Jason Lloyd	Jr
OL	64	Jurrien Loftin	Fr
OL	68	Seth Martin	Fr
WR	20	Nehemiah Martinez	So
TE	84	Zack McCown	Fr
OL	71	Monroe Mills	So
OL	78	Larry Moore	So
QB	16	Jaden Morris	Fr
QB	2	Behren Morton	Fr
OL	72	Landon Peterson	Jr
WR	1	Myles Price (C)	Jr
TE	39	Charles Robinson	Fr
OL	69	Caleb Rodkey	Fr
OL	76	Caleb Rogers (C)	Jr
OL	50	Michael Shanahan	Jr
QB	12	Tyler Shough (C)	Sr
QB	7	Donovan Smith (C)	So
WR	6	J. J. Sparkman	So
OL	74	Cole Spencer (injured)	Sr
TE	43	Henry Teeter (C)	Sr
TE	80	Mason Tharp	So
RB	4	SaRodorick Thompson	Sr
WR	5	Chadarius Townsend	Sr
OL	58	Jack Tucker	Fr
RB	0	Cam'Ron Valdez	Fr
OL	62	Kaden Weatherby	Fr
WR	14	Xavier White	Sr
WR	87	Haydon Wiginton	Fr
OL	56	Dennis Wilburn	Sr
OL	65	Sheridan Wilson	Fr
OL	70	Weston Wright (C)	Sr
TE	41	Jayden York	So

Defense

Pos.	#	Name	Class
DL	43	Joseph Adedire	Fr
OLB	56	Jackson Baggett	Jr
DL	98	E'Maurion Banks	Fr
DB	16	Keyon Blankenbaker	Sr
DL	96	Philip Blidi	Jr
DB	15	Cole Boyd	Jr
DL	97	Tony Bradford Jr. (C)	Sr
DL	91	Blake Burris	Fr
DL	99	Sam Carrell	Fr
DL	5	Myles Cole	Sr
DB	29	Chief Collins	Fr
LB	35	Patrick Curley	Sr
DB	27	Jon-Jon Davis	So
LB	45	Drew Dearman	Fr
DB	24	Malik Dunlap (C)	Sr
DL	52	Harvey Dyson III	Fr
LB	20	Gage Elder	Fr
DB	6	Kosi Eldridge (C)	Sr
LB	17	Taveras Elston Jr.	Fr
OLB	49	Charles Esters III	Fr
DB	7	Adrian Frye (C)	Sr
DB	14	Hut Graham	Fr
OLB	36	James Grando	Jr
DB	22	Maurian Horn	Fr
DB	23	Landon Hullaby	Fr
DL	95	Jaylon Hutchings (C)	Sr
LB	41	Ty Kana	Fr
LB	48	Derrick Lewis II (injured)	So
LB	50	Trent Low	So
DL	90	Syncere Massey	Fr
LB	32	Tyrique Matthews	Sr
DL	93	Trevon McAlpine (injured)	Fr
LB	1	Krishon Merriweather (C)	Sr
DB	3	Kobee Minor	So
LB	11	Dimitri Moore	Sr
OLB	92	L. B. Moore (injured)	So
DB	26	Sammy Morris IV	Fr
DB	18	Tyler Owens	Sr
DB	2	Reggie Pearson Jr.	Sr
DB	12	Jalon Peoples	Fr
OLB	8	Jesiah Pierre (C)	Jr
DB	31	Joseph Plunk	So
OLB	54	Bryce Ramirez (injured)	Jr
LB	46	Ben Roberts	Fr
LB	34	Bryce Robinson (injured)	Jr
LB	13	Jacob Rodriguez	So
DL	42	Vidal Scott	Sr
OLB	59	Isaac Smith	Fr
LB	40	Wesley Smith	Fr
DB	25	Dadrion Taylor-Demerson (C)	Sr
DB	9	Marquis Waters (C)	Sr
DB	21	Cameron Watts (injured)	Sr
DB	10	Cam White	Sr
DB	38	Jett Whitfield	Jr
DB	0	Rayshad Williams (C)	Sr
OLB	19	Tyree Wilson (injured) (C)	Sr
OLB	51	Robert Wooten	So
LB	33	Matthew Young	Sr

Special teams

Pos.	#	Name	Class
K	99	Gino Garcia	Jr
K	48	Stone Harrington	Fr
P	37	Brook Honore'	Fr
LS	30	Jackson Knotts	So
LS	61	Jacob Mauch	So
P	31	Austin McNamara (C)	Sr
K	36	Trey Wolff	Sr

Head coach

- Joey McGuire

Coordinators/assistant coaches

- Zach Kittley
  Offensive coordinator/quarterbacks
- Tim DeRuyter
  Defensive coordinator
- Josh Bookbinder
  Inside linebackers
- C. J. Ah You
  Outside linebackers
- Marcel Yates
  Passing game coordinator/secondary
- Kenny Perry
  Associate head coach/Special teams/Running backs
- Stephen Hamby
  Offensive line
- Emmett Jones
  Passing game coordinator/Wide receivers
- Zarnell Fitch
  Defensive line
- Josh Cochran
  Tight ends
- Lance Barilow
  Strength and conditioning

Legend

- (C) Team captain
- (S) Suspended
- (I) Ineligible
- Injured
- Redshirt

Roster
Last update: November 20, 2022

== Game summaries ==
=== Murray State ===
Murray State Racers at Texas Tech Red Raiders – Game summary

Quarter	1	2	3	4	Total
Racers	3	7	0	0	10
Red Raiders	14	28	14	7	63

at Jones AT&T Stadium, Lubbock, Texas

- Date: September 3
- Game time: 7:00 p.m. CDT
- Game weather: Sunny
- Game attendance: 60,201
- Referee: Dan Scanlan
- TV announcers (ESPN+): Noah Reed and Taylor McHargue
- Box score, Recap

Game information
First quarter
- TTU – Loic Fouonji 45-yard pass from Tyler Shough (Trey Wolff kick), 10:34. Red Raiders 7–0. Drive: 4 plays, 94 yards, 1:20.
- TTU – Tahj Brooks 14-yard run (Gino Garcia kick), 7:28. Red Raiders 14–0. Drive: 4 plays, 59 yards, 1:07.
- MUR – Aaron Baum 31-yard field goal, 2:29. Red Raiders 14–3. Drive: 10 plays, 62 yards, 4:59.

Second quarter

- TTU – Jerand Bradley 30-yard pass from Donovan Smith (Trey Wolff kick), 14:35. Red Raiders 21–3. Drive: 11 plays, 75 yards, 2:54.
- MUR – Jacob Bell 54-yard pass from D. J. Williams (Aaron Baum kick), 13:29. Red Raiders 21–10. Drive: 4 plays, 75 yards, 1:06.
- TTU – Loic Fouonji 39-yard pass from Donovan Smith (Gino Garcia kick), 13:13. Red Raiders 28–10. Drive: 1 play, 39 yards, 0:16.
- TTU – Tahj Brooks 3-yard run (Trey Wolff kick), 8:30. Red Raiders 35–10. Drive: 8 plays, 32 yards, 3:01.
- TTU – Tahj Brooks 23-yard run (Gino Garcia kick), 2:26. Red Raiders 42–10. Drive: 6 plays, 80 yards, 1:59.

Third quarter

- TTU – SaRodrick Thompson 30-yard pass from Donovan Smith (Trey Wolff kick), 12:38. Red Raiders 49–10. Drive: 5 plays, 63 yards, 2:12.
- TTU – Jerand Bradley 14-yard pass from Donovan Smith (Gino Garcia kick), 9:34. Red Raiders 56–10. Drive: 3 plays, 47 yards, 0:59.

Fourth quarter

- TTU – Mason Tharp 21-yard pass from Behren Morton (Trey Wolff kick), 13:40. Red Raiders 63–10. Drive: 2 plays, 35 yards, 0:27.

Statistics	MUR	TTU
First downs	10	29
Total yards	258	605
Rushing yards	50	133
Passing yards	208	472
Turnovers	0	1
Time of possession	34:11	25:49

Team	Category	Player	Statistics
Murray State	Passing	D. J. Williams	8/16, 207 yards, TD
Murray State	Rushing	Damonta Witherspoon	13 rushes, 39 yards
Murray State	Receiving	Jacob Bell	2 receptions, 76 yards, TD
Texas Tech	Passing	Donovan Smith	14/16, 221 yards, 4 TD
Texas Tech	Rushing	Tahj Brooks	6 rushes, 50 yards, 3 TD
Texas Tech	Receiving	Loic Fouonji	4 receptions, 110 yards, 2 TD

Tyler Shough started at quarterback for the Red Raiders but exited the game at the end of the first quarter due to a possible injury. Donovan Smith then came in at quarterback and quickly scored with a 30-yard pass to Jerand Bradley. Murray State's starting quarterback, D. J. Williams, would also be injured, as his right leg gave out on a sack on the last play of the first half. With the Red Raiders up 56–10, Smith exited the game midway through the third quarter and was relieved by Behren Morton. The three Texas Tech quarterbacks went for a combined 27/36 for 472 yards, 6 touchdowns, and one interception.

=== No. 25 Houston ===
No. 25 Houston Cougars at Texas Tech Red Raiders – Game summary

Quarter	1	2	3	4	OT	2OT	Total
No. 25 Cougars	0	3	7	10	7	3	30
Red Raiders	3	14	0	3	7	6	33

at Jones AT&T Stadium, Lubbock, Texas

- Date: September 10
- Game time: 3:00 p.m. CDT
- Game weather: Sunny
- Game attendance: 56,271
- Referee: Luke Richmond
- TV announcers (FS1): Tim Brando and Spencer Tillman
- Box score, Recap

Game information
First quarter
- TTU – Trey Wolff 25-yard field goal, 11:26. Red Raiders 3–0. Drive: 9 plays, 68 yards, 3:34.

Second quarter

- HOU – Bubba Baxa 24-yard field goal, 11:17. Tied 3–3. Drive: 7 plays, 12 yards, 1:49.
- TTU – Nehemiah Martinez 43-yard pass from Donovan Smith (Gino Garcia kick), 10:10. Red Raiders 10–3. Drive: 4 plays, 65 yards, 1:07.
- TTU – Myles Price 54-yard pass from Donovan Smith (Gino Garcia kick), 0:18. Red Raiders 17–3. Drive: 4 plays, 69 yards, 0:41.

Third quarter

- HOU – Brandon Campbell 2-yard run (Bubba Baxa kick), 13:24. Red Raiders 17–10. Drive: 4 plays, 67 yards, 1:36.

Fourth quarter

- HOU – Jayce Rogers 54-yard interception return (Bubba Baxa kick), 12:25. Tied 17–17.
- HOU – Bubba Baxa 35-yard field goal, 0:37. Cougars 20–17. Drive: 4 plays, 3 yards, 0:20.
- TTU – Trey Wolff 47-yard field goal, 0:03. Tied 20–20. Drive: 6 plays, 46 yards, 0:34.

Overtime

- HOU – Matthew Golden 15-yard pass from Clayton Tune (Bubba Baxa kick). Cougars 27–20. Drive: 5 plays, 25 yards.
- TTU – Tahj Brooks 4-yard run (Trey Wolff kick). Tied 27–27. Drive: 6 plays, 25 yards.

Second overtime

- HOU – Bubba Baxa 20-yard field goal. Cougars 30–27. Drive: 7 plays, 22 yards.
- TTU – Donovan Smith 9-yard run. Red Raiders 33–30. Drive: 4 plays, 25 yards.

Statistics	HOU	TTU
First downs	15	35
Total yards	353	468
Rushing yards	87	118
Passing yards	266	350
Turnovers	2	3
Time of possession	22:42	37:18

Team	Category	Player	Statistics
Houston	Passing	Clayton Tune	20/39, 266 yards, TD, INT
Houston	Rushing	Brandon Campbell	16 rushes, 80 yards, TD
Houston	Receiving	Tank Dell	7 receptions, 120 yards
Texas Tech	Passing	Donovan Smith	36/58, 350 yards, 2 TD, 3 INT
Texas Tech	Rushing	Tahj Brooks	17 rushes, 78 yards, TD
Texas Tech	Receiving	Myles Price	5 receptions, 78 yards, TD

This was the Red Raiders' first win over a ranked opponent since 2019 and first win over a ranked non-conference opponent since 1989.

=== At No. 16 NC State ===
Texas Tech Red Raiders at No. 16 NC State Wolfpack – Game summary

Quarter	1	2	3	4	Total
Red Raiders	0	7	0	7	14
No. 16 Wolfpack	6	14	0	7	27

at Carter–Finley Stadium, Raleigh, North Carolina

- Date: September 17
- Game time: 6:00 p.m. CDT / 7:00 p.m. EDT
- Game weather: Sunny, 75 °F (24 °C)
- Game attendance: 56,919
- Referee: Kevin Mar
- TV announcers (ESPN2): Anish Shroff, Brock Osweiler and Taylor McGregor
- Box score, Recap

Game information
First quarter
- NCST – Christopher Dunn 29-yard field goal, 7:39. Wolfpack 3–0. Drive: 7 plays, 1 yard, 3:35.
- NCST – Christopher Dunn 47-yard field goal, 2:29. Wolfpack 6–0. Drive: 6 plays, 26 yards, 3:27.

Second quarter

- NCST – Demie Sumo-Karngbaye 14-yard run, 10:13. Wolfpack 13–0. Drive: 4 plays, 43 yards, 1:41.
- NCST – Aydan White 84-yard interception return (Christopher Dunn kick), 4:40. Wolfpack 20–0.
- TTU – Myles Price 24-yard pass from Donovan Smith (Trey Wolff kick), 0:50. Wolfpack 20–7. Drive: 4 plays, 60 yards, 1:14.

Third quarter

- No scoring plays

Fourth quarter

- NCST – Demie Sumo-Karngbaye 38-yard pass from Thayer Thomas (Christopher Dunn kick), 14:20. Wolfpack 27–7. Drive: 1 play, 38 yards, 0:08.
- TTU – Donovan Smith 3-yard run (Trey Wolff kick), 10:46. Wolfpack 27–14. Drive: 12 plays, 75 yards, 3:34.

Statistics	TTU	NCST
First downs	20	15
Total yards	353	270
Rushing yards	54	111
Passing yards	299	159
Turnovers	4	1
Time of possession	26:56	33:04

Team	Category	Player	Statistics
Texas Tech	Passing	Donovan Smith	21/36, 214 yards, TD, 2 INT
Texas Tech	Rushing	SaRodorick Thompson	9 rushes, 39 yards
Texas Tech	Receiving	Myles Price	4 receptions, 50 yards, TD
NC State	Passing	Devin Leary	15/23, 121 yards
NC State	Rushing	Jordan Houston	13 rushes, 57 yards
NC State	Receiving	Demie Sumo-Karngbaye	4 receptions, 93 yards, TD

=== No. 22 Texas ===
No. 22 Texas Longhorns at Texas Tech Red Raiders – Game summary

Quarter	1	2	3	4	OT	Total
No. 22 Longhorns	10	14	7	3	0	34
Red Raiders	7	7	10	10	3	37

at Jones AT&T Stadium, Lubbock, Texas

- Date: September 24
- Game time: 2:30 p.m. CDT
- Game weather: Sunny, 89 °F (32 °C)
- Game attendance: 60,975
- Referee: David Alvarez
- TV announcers (ESPN): Dave Flemming, Rod Gilmore and Tiffany Blackmon
- Box score, Recap

Game information
First quarter
- TEX – Keilan Robinson 35-yard pass from Hudson Card (Bert Auburn kick), 13:36. Longhorns 7–0. Drive: 3 plays, 62 yards, 1:24.
- TTU – Donovan Smith 4-yard run (Trey Wolff kick), 5:41. Tied 7–7. Drive: 18 plays, 75 yards, 7:55.
- TEX – Bert Auburn 40-yard field goal, 1:52. Longhorns 10–7. Drive: 10 plays, 43 yards, 3:49.

Second quarter

- TTU – Tahj Brooks 17-yard pass from Donovan Smith (Trey Wolff kick), 12:06. Red Raiders 14–10. Drive: 13 plays, 83 yards, 4:46.
- TEX – Xavier Worthy 39-yard pass from Hudson Card (Bert Auburn kick), 6:07. Longhorns 17–14. Drive: 6 plays, 69 yards, 2:49.
- TEX – Bijan Robinson 8-yard run (Bert Auburn kick), 0:24. Longhorns 24–14. Drive: 12 plays, 82 yards, 4:11.

Third quarter

- TTU – Trey Wolff 27-yard field goal, 8:16. Longhorns 24–17. Drive: 15 plays, 59 yards, 4:32.
- TEX – Bijan Robinson 40-yard run (Bert Auburn kick), 4:27. Longhorns 31–17. Drive: 8 plays, 75 yards, 3:49.
- TTU – SaRodrick Thompson 1-yard run (Trey Wolff kick), 1:55. Longhorns 31–24. Drive: 10 plays, 75 yards, 2:32.

Fourth quarter

- TTU – Baylor Cupp 19-yard pass from Donovan Smith (Trey Wolff kick), 7:54. Tied 31–31. Drive: 5 plays, 30 yards, 1:29.
- TTU – Trey Wolff 45-yard field goal, 0:21. Red Raiders 34–31. Drive: 11 plays, 56 yards, 5:05.
- TEX – Bert Auburn 48-yard field goal, 0:00. Tied 34–34. Drive: 5 plays, 46 yards, 0:21.

Overtime

- TTU – Trey Wolff 20-yard field goal. Red Raiders 37–34. Drive: 5 plays, 23 yards.

Statistics	TEX	TTU
First downs	20	31
Total yards	428	479
Rushing yards	151	148
Passing yards	277	331
Turnovers	2	0
Time of possession	24:06	35:54

Team	Category	Player	Statistics
Texas	Passing	Hudson Card	20/30, 277 yards, 2 TD, INT
Texas	Rushing	Bijan Robinson	16 rushes, 103 yards, 2 TD
Texas	Receiving	Jordan Whittington	4 receptions, 53 yards
Texas Tech	Passing	Donovan Smith	38/56, 331 yards, 2 TD
Texas Tech	Rushing	SaRodorick Thompson	17 rushes, 70 yards, TD
Texas Tech	Receiving	Myles Price	13 receptions, 98 yards

This was Texas Tech's first win over Texas in Lubbock since 2008. Texas Tech narrowed the Longhorns' lead in the all-time series to 16 wins against 52 losses in the 68-game in-state rivalry.

Although the Red Raiders held a 14–10 lead early in the second quarter, they trailed 24–14 at halftime. Trailing 31–24 after three quarters, Texas Tech tied the game on a Donavan Smith pass to Baylor Cupp, and then took a 34–31 lead late in the 4th quarter on a Trey Wolff 45-yard field goal. The Red Raiders appeared to have the game in hand as the Longhorns got the ball with just 21 seconds left in the 4th quarter at the Tech 29-yard line. But the Longhorns drove 46 yards in three plays and got a long field goal as time ran out to force overtime. In overtime, the Red Raiders won the coin toss and elected to play on defense first. The strategy paid off when linebacker Krishon Merriweather's hard hit on all-conference tailback Bijon Robinson forced a fumble that was recovered by defensive back Reggie Pierson Jr. Texas Tech's SaRodorick Thompson gained 17 yards on Tech's first offensive play in overtime, setting up Trey Wolff's game-winning field goal.

=== At No. 25 Kansas State ===
Texas Tech Red Raiders at No. 25 Kansas State Wildcats – Game summary

Quarter	1	2	3	4	Total
Red Raiders	0	10	10	8	28
No. 25 Wildcats	13	0	7	17	37

at Bill Snyder Family Football Stadium, Manhattan, Kansas

- Date: October 1
- Game time: 11:00 a.m. CDT
- Game weather: Sunny, 62 °F (17 °C)
- Game attendance: 50,782
- Referee: Scott Campbell
- TV announcers (ESPN+): Mark Neely, Ryan Leaf and Shane Sparks
- Box score, Recap

Game information
First quarter
- KSU – Adrian Martinez 18-yard run (Chris Tennant kick), 14:20. Wildcats 7–0. Drive: 2 plays, 75 yards, 0:40.
- KSU – Chris Tennant 29-yard field goal, 4:57. Wildcats 10–0. Drive: 14 plays, 72 yards, 7:50.
- KSU – Chris Tennant 26-yard field goal, 0:24. Wildcats 13–0. Drive: 6 plays, 25 yards, 3:01.

Second quarter

- TTU – Nehemiah Martinez 6-yard pass from Donovan Smith (Trey Wolff kick), 1:24. Wildcats 13–7. Drive: 9 plays, 86 yards, 4:38.
- TTU – Trey Wolff 51-yard field goal, 0:00. Wildcats 13–10. Drive: 4 plays, 37 yards, 0:21.

Third quarter

- TTU – Trey Wolff 39-yard field goal, 7:14. Tied 13–13. Drive: 8 plays, 46 yards, 2:42.
- KSU – Phillip Brooks 18-yard pass from Adrian Martinez (Chris Tennant kick), 6:04. Wildcats 20–13. Drive: 2 plays, 77 yards, 1:03.
- TTU – Xavier White 12-yard pass from Donovan Smith (Trey Wolff kick), 3:08. Tied 20–20. Drive: 7 plays, 75 yards, 2:56.

Fourth quarter

- KSU – Adrian Martinez 69-yard run (Chris Tennant kick), 13:34. Wildcats 27–20. Drive: 3 plays, 76 yards, 1:16.
- KSU – Chris Tennant 32-yard field goal, 9:07. Wildcats 30–20. Drive: 6 plays, 26 yards, 2:36.
- KSU – Adrian Martinez 12-yard run (Chris Tennant kick), 5:54. Wildcats 37–20. Drive: 4 plays, 27 yards, 2:33.
- TTU – Donovan Smith 3-yard run (Donovan Smith pass to Mason Tharp), 2:23. Wildcats 37–28. Drive: 13 plays, 75 yards, 3:31.

Statistics	TTU	KSU
First downs	26	15
Total yards	473	459
Rushing yards	114	343
Passing yards	359	116
Turnovers	4	1
Time of possession	32:26	27:34

Team	Category	Player	Statistics
Texas Tech	Passing	Donovan Smith	34/48, 359 yards, 2 TD, 2 INT
Texas Tech	Rushing	SaRodorick Thompson	6 rushes, 55 yards
Texas Tech	Receiving	Xavier White	9 receptions, 120 yards, TD
Kansas State	Passing	Adrian Martinez	12/19, 116 yards, TD
Kansas State	Rushing	Adrian Martinez	12 rushes, 171 yards, 3 TD
Kansas State	Receiving	Kade Warner	3 receptions, 47 yards

=== At No. 7 Oklahoma State ===
Texas Tech Red Raiders at No. 7 Oklahoma State Cowboys – Game summary

Quarter	1	2	3	4	Total
Red Raiders	14	10	7	0	31
No. 7 Cowboys	17	3	14	7	41

at Boone Pickens Stadium, Stillwater, Oklahoma

- Date: October 8
- Game time: 2:30 p.m. CDT
- Game weather: Sunny, 70 °F (21 °C)
- Game attendance: 55,509
- Referee: Michael Vandervelde
- TV announcers (FS1): Eric Collins and Devin Gardner
- Box score, Recap

Game information
First quarter
- TTU – Jerand Bradley 27-yard pass from Behren Morton (Trey Wolff kick), 12:17. Red Raiders 7–0. Drive: 11 plays, 75 yards, 2:43.
- OKST – Bryson Green 32-yard pass from Spencer Sanders (Tanner Brown kick), 11:48. Tied 7–7. Drive: 2 plays, 34 yards, 0:29.
- OKST – Spencer Sanders 14-yard run (Tanner Brown kick), 5:03. Cowboys 14–7. Drive: 6 plays, 63 yards, 1:29.
- OKST – Tanner Brown 42-yard field goal, 2:31. Cowboys 17–7. Drive: 7 plays, 43 yards, 1:28.
- TTU – Behren Morton 9-yard run (Trey Wolff kick), 0:20. Cowboys 17–14. Drive: 10 plays, 81 yards, 2:11.

Second quarter

- TTU – Xavier White 4-yard pass from Behren Morton (Trey Wolff kick), 12:33. Red Raiders 21–17. Drive: 8 plays, 64 yards, 2:06.
- OKST – Tanner Brown 22-yard field goal, 7:18. Red Raiders 21–20. Drive: 16 plays, 68 yards, 5:15.
- TTU – Trey Wolff 23-yard field goal, 0:35. Red Raiders 24–20. Drive: 18 plays, 70 yards, 6:43.

Third quarter

- OKST – Tanner Brown 34-yard field goal, 11:25. Red Raiders 24–23. Drive: 12 plays, 58 yards, 3:35.
- TTU – SaRodorick Thompson 2-yard run (Trey Wolff kick), 8:42. Red Raiders 31–23. Drive: 8 plays, 65 yards, 2:43.
- OKST – Spencer Sanders 2-yard run (Jaden Bray run), 3:18. Tied 31–31. Drive: 7 plays, 53 yards, 2:19.
- OKST – Tanner Brown 24-yard field goal, 0:03. Cowboys 34–31. Drive: 7 plays, 12 yards, 2:12.

Fourth quarter

- OKST – Dominic Richardson 7-yard run (Tanner Brown kick), 2:27. Cowboys 41–31. Drive: 11 plays, 57 yards, 3:50.

Statistics	TTU	OKST
First downs	30	25
Total yards	527	434
Rushing yards	148	137
Passing yards	379	297
Turnovers	1	0
Time of possession	32:02	27:58

Team	Category	Player	Statistics
Texas Tech	Passing	Behren Morton	39/62, 379 yards, 2 TD, INT
Texas Tech	Rushing	SaRodorick Thompson	20 rushes, 87 yards, TD
Texas Tech	Receiving	Jerand Bradley	8 receptions, 119 yards, TD
Oklahoma State	Passing	Spencer Sanders	22/45, 297 yards, TD
Oklahoma State	Rushing	Dominic Richardson	19 rushes, 67 yards, TD
Oklahoma State	Receiving	Bryson Green	5 receptions, 115 yards, TD

=== West Virginia ===
West Virginia Mountaineers at Texas Tech Red Raiders – Game summary

Quarter	1	2	3	4	Total
Mountaineers	3	0	7	0	10
Red Raiders	14	3	14	17	48

at Jones AT&T Stadium, Lubbock, Texas

- Date: October 22
- Game time: 2:00 p.m. CDT
- Game weather: Cloudy, 83 °F (28 °C)
- Game attendance: 56,530
- Referee: Steve Baron
- TV announcers (FS1): Noah Eagle and Mark Helfrich
- Box score, Recap

Game information
First quarter
- TTU – Tahj Brooks 19-yard run (Trey Wolff kick), 13:23. Red Raiders 7–0. Drive: 8 plays, 75 yards, 1:37.
- TTU – Tahj Brooks 1-yard run (Trey Wolff kick), 8:35. Red Raiders 14–0. Drive: 16 plays, 80 yards, 3:44.
- WVU – Casey Legg 38-yard field goal, 0:45. Red Raiders 14–3. Drive: 15 plays, 61 yards, 7:50.

Second quarter

- WVU – Trey Wolff 46-yard field goal, 12:25. Red Raiders 17–3. Drive: 12 plays, 47 yards, 3:20.

Third quarter

- TTU – Xavier White 55-yard pass from Behren Morton (Trey Wolff kick), 13:34. Red Raiders 24–3. Drive: 2 plays, 58 yards, 0:41.
- TTU – Loic Fouonji 12-yard pass from Behren Morton (Trey Wolff kick), 6:56. Red Raiders 31–3. Drive: 12 plays, 91 yards, 3:07.
- WVU – Bryce Ford-Wheaton 28-yard pass from JT Daniels (Casey Legg kick), 5:05. Red Raiders 31–10. Drive: 6 plays, 75 yards, 1:51.

Fourth quarter

- TTU – SaRodrick Thompson 13-yard run (Trey Wolff kick), 14:46. Red Raiders 38–10. Drive: 8 plays, 50 yards, 2:14.
- TTU – Trey Wolff 26-yard field goal, 11:58. Red Raiders 41–10. Drive: 8 plays, 48 yards, 2:42.
- TTU – Brady Boyd 2-yard pass from Donovan Smith (Gino Garcio kick), 2:33. Red Raiders 48–10. Drive: 14 plays, 84 yards, 7:48.

Statistics	TEX	TTU
First downs	19	33
Total yards	282	594
Rushing yards	73	239
Passing yards	209	355
Turnovers	4	0
Time of possession	26:09	33:51

Team	Category	Player	Statistics
West Virginia	Passing	JT Daniels	23/36, 194 yards, TD, 3 INT
West Virginia	Rushing	Tony Mathis Jr.	7 rushes, 33 yards
West Virginia	Receiving	Bryce Ford-Wheaton	5 receptions, 53 yards, TD
Texas Tech	Passing	Behren Morton	28/45, 325 yards, 2 TD
Texas Tech	Rushing	Tahj Brooks	17 rushes, 107 yards, 2 TD
Texas Tech	Receiving	Xavier White	8 receptions, 139 yards, TD

=== Baylor ===
Baylor Bears at Texas Tech Red Raiders – Game summary

Quarter	1	2	3	4	Total
Bears	3	14	7	21	45
Red Raiders	0	3	14	0	17

at Jones AT&T Stadium, Lubbock, Texas

- Date: October 29
- Game time: 6:30 p.m. CDT
- Game weather: Clear, 63 °F (17 °C)
- Game attendance: 60,705
- Referee: David Alvarez
- TV announcers (ESPN2): Clay Matvick, Rocky Boiman and Dawn Davenport
- Box score, Recap

Game information
First quarter
- BAY – John Mayers 48-yard field goal, 4:39. Bears 3–0. Drive: 9 plays, 30 yards, 4:06.

Second quarter

- TTU – Trey Wolff 33-yard field goal, 8:09. Tied 3–3. Drive: 6 plays, 48 yards, 1:33.
- BAY – Richard Reese 1-yard run (John Mayers kick), 3:39. Bears 10–3. Drive: 9 plays, 75 yards, 4:30.
- BAY – Richard Reese 2-yard run (John Mayers kick), 0:13. Bears 17–3. Drive: 10 plays, 74 yards, 1:38.

Third quarter

- BAY – Hal Presley 9-yard pass from Blake Shapen (John Mayers kick), 11:09. Bears 24–3. Drive: 7 plays, 34 yards, 3:07.
- TTU – Henry Teeter 1-yard pass from Behren Morton (Trey Wolff kick), 7:34. Bears 24–10. Drive: 15 plays, 75 yards, 3:35.
- TTU – Behren Morton 8-yard run (Trey Wolff kick), 2:46. Bears 24–17. Drive: 8 plays, 40 yards, 2:09.

Fourth quarter

- BAY – Richard Reese 1-yard run (John Mayers kick), 12:46. Bears 31–17. Drive: 11 plays, 75 yards, 5:00.
- BAY – A. J. McCarty 18-yard interception return (John Mayers kick), 4:04. Bears 38–17.
- BAY – Qualan Jones 17-yard run (John Mayers kick), 0:45. Bears 45–17. Drive: 3 plays, 26 yards, 1:38.

Statistics	BAY	TTU
First downs	27	23
Total yards	442	308
Rushing yards	231	149
Passing yards	211	159
Turnovers	1	5
Time of possession	40:17	19:43

Team	Category	Player	Statistics
Baylor	Passing	Blake Shapen	19/30, 211 yards, TD
Baylor	Rushing	Richard Reese	36 rushes, 148 yards, 3 TD
Baylor	Receiving	Gavin Holmes	5 receptions, 77 yards
Texas Tech	Passing	Behren Morton	11/34, 152 yards, TD, 3 INT
Texas Tech	Rushing	Tahj Brooks	16 rushes, 98 yards
Texas Tech	Receiving	Xavier White	2 receptions, 45 yards

=== At No. 7 TCU ===
Texas Tech Red Raiders at No. 7 TCU Horned Frogs – Game summary

Quarter	1	2	3	4	Total
Red Raiders	10	0	7	7	24
No. 7 Horned Frogs	7	6	0	21	34

at Amon G. Carter Stadium, Fort Worth, Texas

- Date: November 5
- Game time: 11:00 a.m CDT
- Game weather: Sunny • Temperature: 51 °F (11 °C) • Wind: SW 3 miles per hour (4.8 km/h)
- Game attendance: 44,760
- Referee: Tuta Salaam
- TV announcers (Fox): Gus Johnson, Joel Klatt and Jenny Taft
- Box score, Recap

Game information
First quarter
- TCU – Derius Davis 82-yard punt return (Griffin Kell kick), 13:20. Horned Frogs 7–0.
- TTU – Jerand Bradley 47-yard pass from Behren Morton (Trey Wolff kick), 5:13. Tied 7–7. Drive: 3 plays, 80 yards, 0:41.
- TTU – Trey Wolff 29-yard field goal, 0:00. Red Raiders 10–7. Drive: 9 plays, 43 yards, 3:28.

Second quarter

- TCU – Griffin Kell 40-yard field goal, 11:58. Tied 10–10. Drive: 7 plays, 47 yards, 3:02.
- TCU – Griffin Kell 30-yard field goal, 0:09. Horned Frogs 13–10. Drive: 11 plays, 71 yards, 3:55.

Third quarter

- TTU – J. J. Sparkman 33-yard pass from Tyler Shough (Trey Wolff kick), 8:38. Red Raiders 17–13. Drive: 9 plays, 77 yards, 2:36.

Fourth quarter

- TCU – Kendre Miller 2-yard run (Griffin Kell kick), 13:25. Horned Frogs 20–17. Drive: 10 plays, 81 yards, 4:12.
- TCU – Derius Davis 23-yard pass from Max Duggan (Griffin Kell kick), 10:53. Horned Frogs 27–17. Drive: 3 plays, 34 yards, 1:28.
- TCU – Emari Demercado 16-yard pass from Max Duggan (Griffin Kell kick), 5:46. Horned Frogs 34–17. Drive: 6 plays, 45 yards, 3:42.
- TTU – Tyler Shough 3-yard run (Trey Wolff kick), 1:46. Horned Frogs 34–24. Drive: 7 plays, 96 yards, 1:48.

Statistics	TTU	TCU
First downs	20	24
Total yards	352	429
Rushing yards	195	234
Passing yards	157	195
Turnovers	1	0
Time of possession	25:21	34:39

Team	Category	Player	Statistics
Texas Tech	Passing	Behren Morton	7/10, 79 yards, TD
Texas Tech	Rushing	Cam'Ron Valdez	3 rushes, 71 yards
Texas Tech	Receiving	Jerand Bradley	2 receptions, 54 yards, TD
TCU	Passing	Max Duggan	12/23, 195 yards, 2 TD
TCU	Rushing	Kendre Miller	21 rushes, 158 yards, TD
TCU	Receiving	Taye Barber	3 receptions, 62 yards

The Horned Frogs entered the game with an 8–0 record and a top-10 ranking. TCU took an early 7–0 lead on a long punt return, but starting quarterback Behren Morton pulled Tech even at 7–7 with a 47-yard touchdown pass to Jerand Bradley. Trey Wolff added a short field goal to put Texas Tech up 10–7, but Morton suffered a lower body injury in the second quarter. He was replaced by Tyler Shough.

Tech's defense held the Horned Frogs scoreless in the third, with Jaylon Hutchings making a key sack against TCU's Max Duggan on a 4th-down play deep in Tech territory. Shough's 33-yard touchdown pass to J.J. Sparkman gave the Red Raiders a 17–13 lead going into the 4th quarter, but the Horned Frogs were able to drive 81 yards to retake the lead. Texas Tech, which committed just 6 penalties in the game, was flagged three times on TCU's go-ahead drive. The drive was extended in part by a blown call on a facemask penalty when Tech's Tyree Wilson sacked TCU's Max Duggan early in the drive deep in TCU territory. The Horned Frogs added two more Max Duggan touchdown passes in the fourth quarter to put the game away. Shough scored on a touchdown run late in the fourth quarter with the game out of reach as Tech fell to 4-5 for the season.

=== Kansas ===
Kansas Jayhawks at Texas Tech Red Raiders – Game summary

Quarter	1	2	3	4	Total
Jayhawks	7	14	0	7	28
Red Raiders	17	10	0	16	43

at Jones AT&T Stadium, Lubbock, Texas

- Date: November 12
- Game time: 6:00 p.m. CST
- Game weather: Clear, 50 °F (10 °C)
- Game attendance: 55,613
- Referee: Kevin Mar
- TV announcers (ESPN+): Courtney Lyle, Ryan Leaf and Tori Petry
- Box score, Recap

Game information
First quarter
- TTU – Donovan Smith 6-yard run (Trey Wolff kick), 11:51. Red Raiders 7–0. Drive: 8 plays, 75 yards, 3:09.
- KU – Jared Casey 66-yard pass from Jason Bean (Jacob Borcila kick), 9:40. Tied 7–7. Drive: 4 plays, 75 yards, 2:11.
- TTU – Trey Wolff 33-yard field goal, 5:53. Red Raiders 10–7. Drive: 12 plays, 60 yards, 3:47.
- TTU – SaRodrick Thompson 36-yard run (Trey Wolff kick), 0:48. Red Raiders 17–7. Drive: 6 plays, 76 yards, 2:26.

Second quarter

- TTU – Mason Tharp 1-yard pass from Tyler Shough (Trey Wolff kick), 9:36. Red Raiders 24–7. Drive: 12 plays, 61 yards, 3:51.
- KU – Jason Bean 16-yard run (Jacob Borcila kick), 5:44. Red Raiders 24–14. Drive: 7 plays, 77 yards, 3:52.
- KU – Luke Grimm 3-yard pass from Jason Bean (Jacob Borcila kick), 2:31. Red Raiders 24–21. Drive: 4 plays, 73 yards, 1:47.
- TTU – Trey Wolff 51-yard field goal, 0:00. Red Raiders 27–21. Drive: 3 plays, 35 yards, 0:13.

Third quarter

- No scoring plays

Fourth quarter

- TTU – Tyler Shough 9-yard run (run failed), 14:52. Red Raiders 33–21. Drive: 9 plays, 79 yards, 3:40.
- KU – Quentin Skinner 20-yard pass from Jason Bean (Jacob Borcila kick), 8:06. Red Raiders 33–28. Drive: 6 plays, 60 yards, 1:38.
- TTU – Trey Wolff 30-yard field goal, 4:19. Red Raiders 36–28. Drive: 9 plays, 63 yards, 3:47.
- TTU – Tahj Brooks 5-yard run (Trey Wolff kick), 3:33. Red Raiders 43–28. Drive: 3 plays, 8 yards, 0:36.

Statistics	KU	TTU
First downs	20	26
Total yards	525	510
Rushing yards	242	264
Passing yards	283	246
Turnovers	2	0
Time of possession	28:33	31:27

Team	Category	Player	Statistics
Kansas	Passing	Jason Bean	17/28, 270 yards, 3 TD, INT
Kansas	Rushing	Devin Neal	24 rushes, 190 yards
Kansas	Receiving	Lawrence Arnold	4 receptions, 110 yards
Texas Tech	Passing	Tyler Shough	20/33, 246 yards, TD
Texas Tech	Rushing	Tyler Shough	12 rushes, 76 yards, TD
Texas Tech	Receiving	Xavier White	4 receptions, 70 yards

=== At Iowa State ===
Texas Tech Red Raiders at Iowa State Cyclones – Game summary

Quarter	1	2	3	4	Total
Red Raiders	0	7	0	7	14
Cyclones	0	3	0	7	10

at Jack Trice Stadium, Ames, Iowa

- Date: November 19
- Game time: 6:00 p.m. CST
- Game weather: Clear, 22 °F (−6 °C)
- Game attendance: 52,676
- Referee: Steve Baron
- TV announcers (FS1): Eric Collins and Devin Gardner
- Box score, Recap

Game information
First quarter
- No scoring plays

Second quarter

- TTU – Donovan Smith 1-yard run (Trey Wolff kick), 12:23. Red Raiders 7–0. Drive: 14 plays, 96 yards, 5:04.
- ISU – Drake Nettles 36-yard field goal, 6:38. Red Raiders 7–3. Drive: 14 plays, 82 yards, 5:40.

Third quarter

- No scoring plays

Fourth quarter

- ISU – Easton Dean 24-yard pass from Hunter Dekkers (Jace Gilbert kick), 11:18. Cyclones 10–7. Drive: 7 plays, 53 yards, 2:59.
- TTU – Baylor Cupp 4-yard pass from Tyler Shough (Trey Wolff kick), 6:10. Red Raiders 14–10. Drive: 13 plays, 77 yards, 5:02.

Statistics	TTU	ISU
First downs	14	22
Total yards	246	422
Rushing yards	105	128
Passing yards	141	294
Turnovers	1	0
Time of possession	23:55	36:05

Team	Category	Player	Statistics
Texas Tech	Passing	Tyler Shough	15/21, 141 yards, TD
Texas Tech	Rushing	Tahj Brooks	9 rushes, 45 yards
Texas Tech	Receiving	Myles Price	3 receptions, 42 yards
Iowa State	Passing	Hunter Dekkers	23/35, 294 yards, TD
Iowa State	Rushing	Cartevious Norton	19 rushes, 59 yards
Iowa State	Receiving	Xavier Hutchinson	8 receptions, 101 yards

=== Oklahoma ===
Oklahoma Sooners at Texas Tech Red Raiders – Game summary

Quarter	1	2	3	4	OT	Total
Sooners	14	10	7	17	0	48
Red Raiders	0	23	15	10	3	51

at Jones AT&T Stadium, Lubbock, Texas

- Date: November 26
- Game time: 6:30 p.m. CST
- Game weather: Clear, 43 °F (6 °C)
- Game attendance: 51,126
- Referee: Derek Anderson
- TV announcers (FS1): Eric Collins and Devin Gardner
- Box score, Recap

Game information
First quarter
- OU – Marvin Mims 37-yard pass from Dillon Gabriel (Zach Schmit kick), 13:19. Sooners 7–0. Drive: 4 plays, 3 yards, 1:19.
- OU – Brayden Willis 7-yard pass from Dillon Gabriel (Zach Schmit kick), 9:24. Sooners 14–0. Drive: 11 plays, 93 yards, 2:58.

Second quarter

- OU – Zach Schmit 41-yard field goal, 13:04. Sooners 17–0. Drive: 13 plays, 64 yards, 4:47.
- TTU – Jaylon Hutchings 1-yard run (kick failed), 9:45. Sooners 17–6. Drive: 11 plays, 75 yards, 3:19.
- OU – Marvin Mims 77-yard pass from Dillon Gabriel (Zach Schmit kick), 6:25. Sooners 24–6. Drive: 1 play, 77 yards, 0:13.
- TTU – SaRodrick Thompson 6-yard run (Trey Wolff kick), 3:09. Sooners 24–13. Drive: 10 plays, 75 yards, 3:16.
- TTU – Donovan Smith 6-yard run (Trey Wolff kick), 1:28. Sooners 24–20. Drive: 4 plays, 29 yards, 0:48.
- TTU – Trey Wolff 29-yard field goal, 0:00. Sooners 24–23. Drive: 8 plays, 77 yards, 0:48.

Third quarter

- TTU – SaRodrick Thompson 7-yard run (Trey Wolff kick), 10:52. Red Raiders 30–24. Drive: 5 plays, 62 yards, 1:55.
- OU – Theo Wease 61-yard pass from Dillon Gabriel (Zach Schmit kick), 10:09. Sooners 31–30. Drive: 3 plays, 75 yards, 0:43.
- TTU – Donovan Smith 15-yard pass from Tyler Shough (Xavier White run), 2:46. Red Raiders 38–31. Drive: 7 plays, 62 yards, 3:20.

Fourth quarter

- OU – Brayden Willis 5-yard pass from Dillon Gabriel (Zach Schmit kick), 10:37. Tied 38–38. Drive: 6 plays, 75 yards, 2:25.
- TTU – Jerand Bradley 44-yard pass from Tyler Shough (Trey Wolff kick), 8:43. Red Raiders 45–38. Drive: 5 plays, 75 yards, 1:54.
- OU – Jalil Farooq 1-yard pass from Dillon Gabriel (Zach Schmit kick), 7:24. Tied 45–45. Drive: 5 plays, 75 yards, 1:19.
- OU – Zach Schmit 42-yard field goal, 4:04. Sooners 48–45. Drive: 4 plays, 8 yards, 1:12.
- TTU – Trey Wolff 43-yard field goal, 0:03. Tied 48–48. Drive: 13 plays, 50 yards, 4:01.

Overtime

- TTU – Trey Wolff 35-yard field goal. Red Raiders 51–48. Drive: 4 plays, 8 yards.

Statistics	OU	TTU
First downs	27	31
Total yards	672	599
Rushing yards	210	163
Passing yards	462	436
Turnovers	1	2
Time of possession	27:26	32:34

Team	Category	Player	Statistics
Oklahoma	Passing	Dillon Gabriel	28/40, 449 yards, 6 TD, INT
Oklahoma	Rushing	Eric Gray	28 rushes, 163 yards
Oklahoma	Receiving	Marvin Mims	5 receptions, 162 yards, 2 TD
Texas Tech	Passing	Tyler Shough	31/50, 436 yards, 2 TD, INT
Texas Tech	Rushing	SaRodorick Thompson	21 rushes, 86 yards, 2 TD
Texas Tech	Receiving	Jerand Bradley	8 receptions, 173 yards, TD

This was Texas Tech's first win over Oklahoma since 2011.

=== Vs. Ole Miss (Texas Bowl) ===
2022 Texas Bowl
Texas Tech Red Raiders vs. Ole Miss Rebels – Game summary

Quarter	1	2	3	4	Total
Red Raiders	10	16	0	16	42
Rebels	7	0	6	12	25

at NRG Stadium, Houston, Texas

- Date: December 28
- Game time: 8:00 p.m. CST
- Game weather: None (retractable roof closed)
- Game attendance: 53,251
- Referee: Stuart Mullins
- TV announcers (ESPN): Roy Philpott, Andre Ware and Ian Fitzsimmons
- Box score, Recap

Game information
First quarter
- TTU – Tyler Shough 2-yard run (Trey Wolff kick), 6:43. Red Raiders 7–0. Drive: 7 plays, 27 yards, 2:30.
- MISS – Zach Evans 8-yard run (Jonathan Cruz kick), 5:26. Tied 7–7. Drive: 5 plays, 75 yards, 1:17.
- TTU – Trey Wolff 42-yard field goal, 3:23. Red Raiders 10–7. Drive: 7 plays, 49 yards, 2:03.

Second quarter

- TTU – Tyler Shough 2-yard run (Trey Wolff kick), 6:59. Red Raiders 17–7. Drive: 4 plays, 9 yards, 1:03.
- TTU – Trey Wolff 32-yard field goal, 2:13. Red Raiders 20–7. Drive: 8 plays, 18 yards, 4:11.
- TTU – Jerand Bradley 12-yard pass from Tyler Shough (pass failed), 0:28. Red Raiders 26–7. Drive: 5 plays, 37 yards, 1:14.

Third quarter

- MISS – Jordan Watkins 11-yard pass from Jaxson Dart (kick failed), 9:08. Red Raiders 26–13. Drive: 10 plays, 80 yards, 3:40.

Fourth quarter

- TTU – SaRodrick Thompson 1-yard run (run failed), 13:20. Red Raiders 32–13. Drive: 11 plays, 71 yards, 3:35.
- TTU – Trey Wolff 26-yard field goal, 9:36. Red Raiders 35–13. Drive: 7 plays, 66 yards, 2:27.
- MISS – Jaxson Dart 9-yard run (pass failed), 7:35. Red Raiders 35–19. Drive: 7 plays, 75 yards, 2:01.
- MISS – Malik Heath 19-yard pass from Jaxson Dart (pass failed), 3:10. Red Raiders 35–25. Drive: 9 plays, 80 yards, 2:30.
- TTU – Loic Fouonji 44-yard kickoff return (Trey Wolff kick), 3:03. Red Raiders 42–25.

Statistics	TTU	MISS
First downs	27	27
Total yards	484	558
Rushing yards	242	197
Passing yards	242	361
Turnovers	3	5
Time of possession	33:17	26:43

Team	Category	Player	Statistics
Texas Tech	Passing	Tyler Shough	24/39, 242 yards, TD, INT
Texas Tech	Rushing	Tyler Shough	25 rushes, 111 yards, 2 TD
Texas Tech	Receiving	Loic Fouonji	7 receptions, 100 yards
Ole Miss	Passing	Jaxson Dart	25/41, 361 yards, 2 TD, 3 INT
Ole Miss	Rushing	Quinshon Judkins	23 rushes, 91 yards
Ole Miss	Receiving	Malik Heath	8 receptions, 137 yards, TD

== Statistics ==
=== Scoring ===
Scores against non-conference opponents

	1	2	3	4	OT	2OT	Total
Opponents	16	24	13	29	7	3	92
Texas Tech	27	65	14	33	7	6	152

Scores against the Big 12

	1	2	3	4	OT	Total
Opponents	74	64	49	96	0	283
Texas Tech	62	73	77	75	6	293

Scores against all opponents

	1	2	3	4	OT	2OT	Total
Opponents	90	88	62	125	7	3	375
Texas Tech	89	138	91	104	13	6	441

=== Offense ===
Passing statistics
#	POS	NAME	CMP	ATT	YDS	CMP%	AVG	LONG	TD	INT	RTG
7	QB	Donovan Smith	147	222	1,505	66.2	6.8	58	12	8	133.8
12	QB	Tyler Shough	106	177	1,304	59.9	7.4	47	7	4	130.3
2	QB	Behren Morton	96	169	1,117	56.8	6.6	55	7	6	118.9
1	WR	Myles Price	0	1	0	0.0	0.0	0	0	0	0.0
		TOTALS	349	570	3,926	61.2	6.9	58	26	18	127.8

Rushing statistics
#	POS	NAME	ATT	YDS	AVG	LNG	TD
28	RB	Tahj Brooks	147	691	4.7	37	7
4	RB	SaRodorick Thompson	139	684	4.9	36	7
12	QB	Tyler Shough	72	269	3.7	36	4
0	RB	Cam'Ron Valdez	18	169	9.4	38	0
7	QB	Donovan Smith	76	116	1.5	27	7
2	QB	Behren Morton	42	79	1.9	15	2
22	RB	Bryson Donnell	16	72	4.5	38	0
20	WR	Nehemiah Martinez	2	12	6.0	6	0
14	WR	Xavier White	1	5	5.0	5	0
25	RB	Blake Bedwell	2	4	2.0	1	0
95	DL	Jaylon Hutchings	1	1	1.0	1	0
		TOTALS	525	2,072	3.9	38	28

Receiving statistics
#	POS	NAME	REC	YDS	AVG	LNG	TD
9	WR	Jerand Bradley	51	744	14.6	47	6
14	WR	Xavier White	45	572	12.7	55	3
1	WR	Myles Price	51	513	10.1	54	2
19	WR	Loic Fouonji	34	451	13.3	39	3
20	WR	Nehemiah Martinez	32	394	12.3	43	2
10	WR	Trey Cleveland	22	344	15.6	58	0
28	RB	Tahj Brooks	27	164	6.1	17	1
6	WR	J. J. Sparkman	14	150	10.7	33	1
88	TE	Baylor Cupp	12	132	11.0	24	2
13	WR	Brady Boyd	13	125	9.6	18	1
4	RB	SaRodorick Thompson	23	119	5.2	30	1
80	TE	Mason Tharp	12	100	8.3	21	2
43	TE	Henry Teeter	6	61	10.2	23	1
86	WR	Jordan Brown	3	18	6.0	10	0
7	QB	Donovan Smith	1	15	15.0	15	1
82	WR	Drew Hocutt	1	11	11.0	11	0
87	WR	Haydon Wiginton	1	7	7.0	7	0
21	WR	Tyler King	1	6	6.0	6	0
		TOTALS	349	3,926	11.2	58	26

=== Special teams ===
Kicking statistics
#	Name	XPM	XPA	XP%	FGM	FGA	FG%	1–19	20–29	30–39	40–49	50+	LNG	PTS
36	Trey Wolff	41	42	97.6	21	25	84.0	0/0	8/8	6/6	5/9	2/2	51	104
99	Gino Garcia	7	7	100.0	0	1	0.0	0/0	0/0	0/0	0/1	0/0	0	7
	TOTALS	48	49	98.0	21	26	80.8	0/0	8/8	6/6	5/10	2/2	51	111

== Weekly awards ==
- Big 12 Offensive Player of the Week

Donovan Smith (week 2 vs. Houston)

- Big 12 Defensive Player of the Week

Reggie Pearson (week 4 vs. Texas)

- Big 12 Special Teams Player of the Week

Trey Wolff (week 4 vs. Texas)
Trey Wolff (week 11 vs. Kansas)
Trey Wolff (week 13 vs. Oklahoma)

- Big 12 Newcomer of the Week

Behren Morton (week 8 vs. West Virginia)

- Earl Campbell Tyler Rose Award National Player of the Week

Donovan Smith (week 4 vs. Texas)

== Players drafted into the NFL ==
Round	Pick	Player	Position	NFL Club
1	7	Tyree Wilson	DE	Las Vegas Raiders
