= Jerand Bradley =

American football player (born 2002)

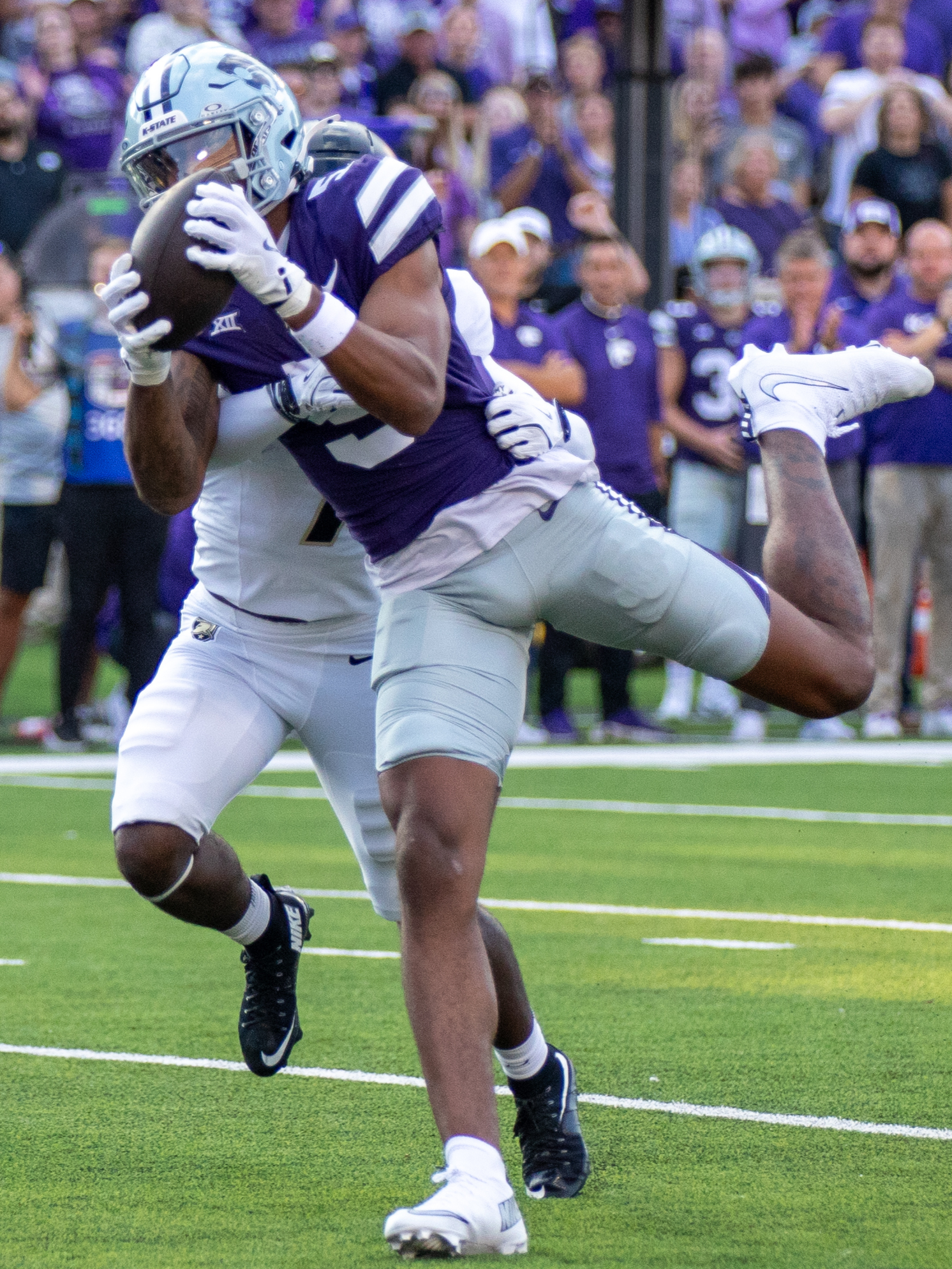
- Bradley with Kansas State in 2025

No. 0 – Winnipeg Blue Bombers
- Position: Wide receiver / Tight end
- Roster status: Practice roster
- CFL status: American

Personal information
- Born: October 10, 2002 (age 24); Dallas, Texas, U.S.
- Listed height: 6 ft 5 in (1.96 m)
- Listed weight: 241 lb (109 kg)

Career information
- High school: DeSoto (DeSoto, Texas)
- College: Texas Tech (2021–2023); Boston College (2024); Kansas State (2025)
- NFL draft: 2026: undrafted

Career history
- Los Angeles Chargers (2026)*; Winnipeg Blue Bombers (2026–present)*
- * Offseason or practice squad member only

Jerand Bradley (born October 10, 2002) is an American professional football wide receiver for the Winnipeg Blue Bombers of the Canadian Football League (CFL). He played college football for the Texas Tech Red Raiders, Boston College Eagles and Kansas State Wildcats.

== Early life ==
Bradley grew up in Frisco, Texas and attended John Paul II High School before transferring to DeSoto High School during his senior year. In his high school career, he caught 57 passes for 784 yards and eight touchdowns. Bradley committed to play college football at Texas Tech over other schools such as Arizona, Arizona State, Colorado, Duke, Utah, and Wisconsin.

== College career ==
=== 2021 ===
Bradley made his college debut for Texas Tech in week 3 of the 2021 season, where he brought in one reception for five yards in a 54–21 win over FIU. In the 2021 Liberty Bowl, he racked up two receptions for 64 yards in a win over Mississippi State 34–7. Bradley finished the season with five receptions for 99 yards.

=== 2022 ===
In the 2022 season opener, Bradley caught six passes for 108 yards and two touchdowns in a 63–10 win over Murray State. In week 6, he brought in eight passes for 119 yards and a touchdown in a 41–31 loss to Oklahoma State. In the season finale, Bradley brought in eight passes for 173 yards and a touchdown in a 51–48 win over Oklahoma. In the Red Raiders bowl game, he caught eight passes for 88 yards and a touchdown in a win over Ole Miss. Bradley finished the season with 51 receptions for 744 yards and six touchdowns.

=== 2023 ===
Bradley was named preseason first-team all-Big 12 prior to the 2023 season. He was also selected for the preseason watchlists for the Fred Biletnikoff Award and Earl Campbell Tyler Rose Award.

On December 1, 2023, Bradley announced that he would be entering the transfer portal. On December 18, he announced that he would be transferring to Boston College.

On December 9, 2024, Bradley announced that he would enter the transfer portal for the second time. He committed to play for the Kansas State Wildcats on December 21.

=== Statistics ===
Season	Team	GP	Receiving			
Season	Team	GP	Rec	Yds	Avg	TD
2021	Texas Tech	4	5	99	19.8	0
2022	Texas Tech	12	51	744	14.6	6
2023	Texas Tech	12	36	431	12.0	4
2024	Boston College	9	6	94	15.7	2
2025	Kansas State	9	13	184	14.2	2
Career		37	98	1,368	14.0	12

== Professional career ==
Pre-draft measurables
Height	Weight	Arm length	Hand span	Wingspan	40-yard dash	10-yard split	20-yard split	20-yard shuttle	Three-cone drill	Vertical jump	Broad jump	Bench press
6 ft 5 in (1.96 m)	241 lb (109 kg)	34 1/8 in (0.87 m)	9 7/8 in (0.25 m)	6 ft 10 1/4 in (2.09 m)	4.65 s	1.66 s	2.70 s	4.46 s	7.20 s	32.5 in (0.83 m)	10 ft 0 in (3.05 m)	15 reps
All values from Pro Day

=== Los Angeles Chargers ===
After going undrafted in the 2026 NFL draft, Bradley signed with the Los Angeles Chargers as an undrafted free agent. He was waived by Los Angeles as a part of final roster cuts on August 30, 2026.

=== Winnipeg Blue Bombers ===
On September 26, 2026, Bradley signed with the Winnipeg Blue Bombers practice roster of the Canadian Football League (CFL).

== Personal life ==
Bradley is the younger cousin of former NFL wide receivers Rodney Bradley and Bethel Johnson.
