= John David Baker =

American football coach (born 1990)

Current position
- Title: Offensive coordinator
- Team: Ole Miss
- Conference: SEC

Biographical details
- Born: September 30, 1990 (age 36)

Playing career
- 2009–2013: Abilene Christian
- 2014–2015: Amarillo Venom
- Position: Quarterback

Coaching career (HC unless noted)
- 2014–2015: Abilene Christian (GA)
- 2016–2018: North Texas (OQC)
- 2019: USC (OQC)
- 2020: USC (TE)
- 2021: Ole Miss (TE/PGC)
- 2022–2023: Ole Miss (co-OC/TE)
- 2024–2025: East Carolina (OC/QB)
- 2026–present: Ole Miss (OC)

John David Baker (born September 30, 1990) is an American football coach who is the offensive coordinator for the Ole Miss football team. Baker played college football for the Abilene Christian Wildcats and professionally for the Amarillo Venom of the Lone Star Football League (LSFL) and Champions Indoor Football (CIF) from 2014 to 2015.

Prior to joining the Ole Miss football staff, he was the offensive quality control assistant for both North Texas and USC before becoming the tight ends coach for the Trojans in 2020. He was the offensive coordinator for ECU in 2024 and 2025, where his work was widely praised.

== Early life and playing career ==
Baker grew up in San Angelo, Texas and attended Lake View High School, where he was a member of the basketball, baseball, football, and track and field teams. He was named the All-West Texas MVP by the San Angelo Standard-Times as a senior after passing for 2,240 yards and 22 touchdowns while also rushing for 688 yards and 18 touchdowns.

Baker played college football at the Abilene Christian University. He redshirted his true freshman season and was a backup quarterback for his next three seasons for the Wildcats. Baker was named the starting quarterback going into his redshirt senior season. In his only season as a starter, he completed 247-of-369 passes for 3,376 yards with 35 touchdowns and five interceptions and also rushed for 256 yards and five touchdowns.

After his collegiate career, Baker played professional indoor football for the Amarillo Venom of the Lone Star Football League (LSFL) and Champions Indoor Football (CIF) from 2014 to 2015.

== Coaching career ==
=== Early years ===
Baker began his coaching career as a graduate assistant at Abilene Christian in 2014. He was hired as an offensive quality control assistant at North Texas (UNT) in 2016. Baker spent three seasons at North Texas before joining the coaching staff at USC in the same role after the program hired former UNT offensive coordinator Graham Harrell. Baker was promoted to tight ends coach after one season at USC.

=== Ole Miss ===
Baker was hired as the tight ends coach and passing game coordinator at Ole Miss on January 28, 2021. He was promoted to co-Offensive Coordinator in addition to tight ends coach entering the 2022 season.

=== East Carolina ===
Baker was hired as the offensive coordinator for the East Carolina Pirates on December 2, 2023.
