= Trey Wolff =

American football player (born 2000)

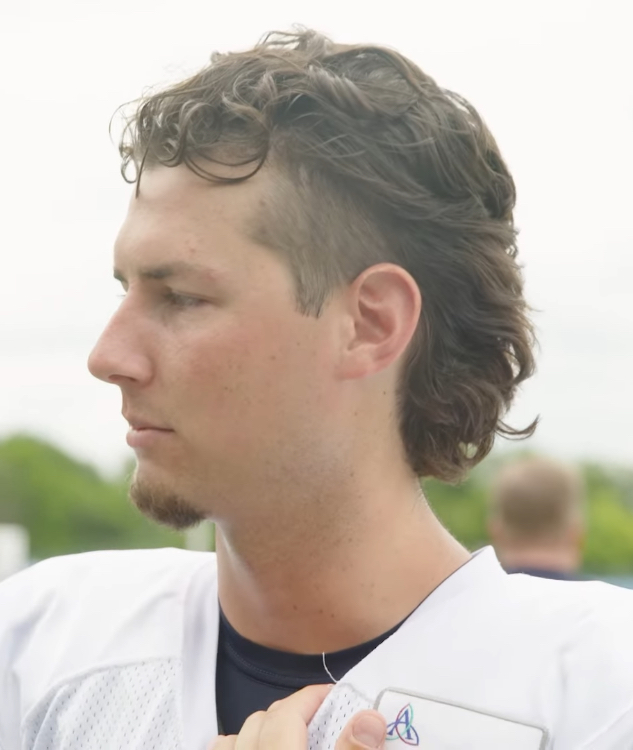
- Wolff with the Tennessee Titans in 2023

No. 40
- Position: Kicker

Personal information
- Born: February 22, 2000 (age 26); Spring, Texas, U.S.
- Listed height: 6 ft 4 in (1.93 m)
- Listed weight: 205 lb (93 kg)

Career information
- High school: Klein (Klein, Texas)
- College: Texas Tech (2018–2022)
- NFL draft: 2023: undrafted

Career history
- Tennessee Titans (2023)*
- * Offseason or practice squad member only

Trey Davis Wolff (born February 22, 2000) is an American former football kicker. He played college football for the Texas Tech Red Raiders and was signed by the Tennessee Titans as an undrafted free agent in 2023.

== Early life ==
Wolff was born in Spring, Texas. Wolff attended Klein High School, where he played American football, both as a kicker and punter.

== College career ==
Wolff attended Texas Tech University from 2018 to 2022.

In 2018, for his freshman season, he did not see the field.

In 2019, for his redshirt freshman season, Wolff made 20 of 22 field goal attempts (90.9%) and 40 of 41 on extra point attempts (97.6%) which combined for 100 points.

In 2020, for his sophomore season, Wolff made 1 of 5 field goal attempts (20.0%), and 26 of 27 on extra point attempts (96.3%) which combined for 29 points.

In 2021, for his junior season, Wolff did not attempt a field goal or an extra point, rather playing as a kickoff specialist.

In 2022, for his senior season, Wolff made 21 of 25 field goal attempts (84.0%), and 41 of 42 on extra point attempts (97.6%) which combined for 104 points.

He finished his career making 42 of his 52 field goal attempts (80.8%), and went 107 of 110 on extra point attempts (97.3%) which combined for 233 points.

=== College statistics ===
Year	Team	Kicking							
Year	Team	FGM	FGA	FG%	Long	XPM	XPA	XP%	PTS
2019	Texas Tech	20	22	90.9%	45	40	41	97.6%	100
2020	Texas Tech	1	5	20.0%	40	26	27	96.4%	29
2021	Texas Tech	0	0	0.0%	0	0	0	0.0%	0
2022	Texas Tech	21	25	84.0%	51	41	42	97.6%	104
Career		42	52	80.8%	51	107	110	97.3%	233

== Professional career ==
Pre-draft measurables
Height	Weight	Arm length	Hand span
6 ft 4 in (1.93 m)	205 lb (93 kg)	30 1/2 in (0.77 m)	9 1/4 in (0.23 m)
All values from Pro Day

Wolff went undrafted in the 2023 NFL draft and was signed by the Tennessee Titans on May 12, 2023. In his only 2 preseason games, Wolff made 1 of 2 field goal attempts, making from 22, but missing from 49, and went 5 of 5 on extra point attempts. Wolff was waived by the Titans on August 22, 2023.
