= 2020 Armed Forces Bowl =

The 2020 Armed Forces Bowl may refer to:

- 2020 Armed Forces Bowl (January) – a bowl game following the 2019 season, played between Tulane and Southern Miss on January 4, 2020
- 2020 Armed Forces Bowl (December) – a bowl game following the 2020 season, played between Tulsa and Mississippi State on December 31, 2020
