= Malik Heath =

American football player (born 2000)

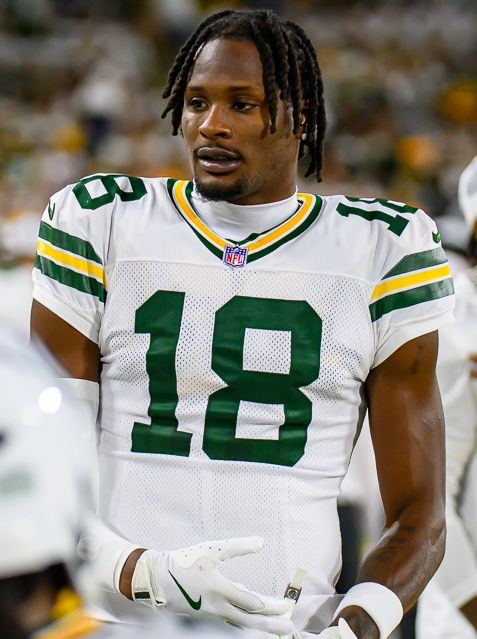
- Heath with the Green Bay Packers in 2025

No. 84 – Washington Commanders
- Position: Wide receiver
- Roster status: Practice squad

Personal information
- Born: March 31, 2000 (age 26); Canton, Mississippi, U.S.
- Listed height: 6 ft 2 in (1.88 m)
- Listed weight: 213 lb (97 kg)

Career information
- High school: Callaway (Jackson, Mississippi)
- College: Copiah–Lincoln (2018–2019); Mississippi State (2020–2021); Ole Miss (2022)
- NFL draft: 2023: undrafted

Career history
- Green Bay Packers (2023–2025); Atlanta Falcons (2025); Washington Commanders (2026–present)*
- * Offseason or practice squad member only

Career NFL statistics
- Receptions: 31
- Receiving yards: 308
- Receiving touchdowns: 3
- Stats at Pro Football Reference

Malik Shabazz Heath (born March 3, 2000) is an American professional football wide receiver for the Washington Commanders of the National Football League (NFL). He played college football for the Copiah–Lincoln Wolves, Mississippi State Bulldogs, and Ole Miss Rebels. Heath signed with the Green Bay Packers as an undrafted free agent in 2023.

== Early life ==
Heath grew up in Jackson, Mississippi and attended Callaway High School. He caught 78 passes for 1,837 yards and 13 touchdowns over the course of his high school career. Heath is the son of former Jackson State University TE Harold Heath.

== College career ==
Heath began his college career at Copiah–Lincoln Community College. He caught 61 passes, 835 yards, and seven touchdowns in 17 games over two seasons. Heath transferred to Mississippi State following his sophomore year.

On August 12, 2020, before playing for Mississippi State, Heath was charged with speeding, driving under the influence, and driving without a license, equipment, or insurance. Heath caught 37 passes for 307 yards and three touchdowns in his first season at Mississippi State. During the 2020 Armed Forces Bowl, he was involved in a brawl which included him kicking Tulsa defensive back TieNeal Martin who was on the ground. Following the game, Heath had bragged about it on social media and received backlash for the incident. He had 34 receptions for 442 yards and five touchdowns in 2021. On December 2, 2021, Heath was involved in a car crash in Mississippi, suffered a double lung collapse, a ruptured liver, and broke his entire rib cage. Heath was airlifted to Memphis, Tennessee, and underwent emergency surgery to save his life. This ended his season, being unavailable to play in the 2021 Liberty Bowl. After the end of the season, Heath entered the NCAA transfer portal.

Heath ultimately transferred to Ole Miss. In his only season with the Rebels, he led the team with 60 receptions, 971 receiving yards, and five touchdown receptions.

== Professional career ==
Pre-draft measurables
Height	Weight	Arm length	Hand span	40-yard dash	10-yard split	20-yard split	20-yard shuttle	Three-cone drill	Vertical jump	Broad jump	Bench press
6 ft 2 3/8 in (1.89 m)	213 lb (97 kg)	32 1/2 in (0.83 m)	9 1/8 in (0.23 m)	4.64 s	1.53 s	2.64 s	4.46 s	6.96 s	34.0 in (0.86 m)	10 ft 4 in (3.15 m)	12 reps

=== Green Bay Packers ===
After going undrafted at the 2023 NFL draft, Heath was signed by the Green Bay Packers on May 1, 2023. On August 29, the Packers announced that Heath had made the initial 53-man roster. Heath joined with two other rookies including Jayden Reed and Dontayvion Wicks. He made his NFL debut on September 10, during a 38–20 win against the Chicago Bears, but recorded no statistics until November 19, when he made his first catch (a 7-yard pass from Jordan Love) during a 23–20 win against the Los Angeles Chargers. On December 11, Heath scored his first NFL touchdown on a 6-yard pass from Love during a 22–24 loss to the New York Giants.

Heath made 13 appearances (one start) for Green Bay during the 2024 season, recording 10 receptions for 97 yards and two touchdowns. In 2025, he made 11 appearances for the Packers, logging six receptions for 86 scoreless yards. On December 6, 2025, Heath was waived by the Packers.

=== Atlanta Falcons ===
On December 8, 2025, Heath was claimed off waivers by the Atlanta Falcons. He did not play a game for the Falcons during the remainder of the 2025 season.

=== Washington Commanders ===
On November 19, 2026, the Washington Commanders signed Heath to their practice squad.

== NFL career statistics ==
Legend
**Bold**	Career high

=== Regular season ===
Year	Team	Games		Receiving					Fumbles	
Year	Team	GP	GS	Rec	Yds	Avg	Lng	TD	Fum	Lost
2023	GB	**13**	**1**	**15**	**125**	8.3	16	1	0	0
2024	GB	**13**	**1**	10	97	9.7	**41**	**2**	0	0
2025	GB	11	0	6	86	**14.3**	37	0	0	0
Total		37	2	31	308	8.3	41	3	0	0
Source: pro-football-reference.com

==== Postseason ====
Year	Team	Games		Receiving					Fumbles	
Year	Team	GP	GS	Rec	Yds	Avg	Lng	TD	Fum	Lost
2024	GB	1	0	0	0	0.0	0	0	0	0
Career		1	0	0	0	0.0	0	0	0	0
Source: pro-football-reference.com
