= Dayton Wade =

American football player (born 2000)

Profile
- Position: Wide receiver

Personal information
- Born: September 8, 2000 (age 26); Atlanta, Georgia, U.S.
- Listed height: 5 ft 9 in (1.75 m)
- Listed weight: 184 lb (83 kg)

Career information
- High school: Lovejoy (Hampton, Georgia)
- College: Western Kentucky (2019–2021); Ole Miss (2022–2023)
- NFL draft: 2024: undrafted

Career history
- Baltimore Ravens (2024–2025)*
- * Offseason or practice squad member only
- Stats at Pro Football Reference

Dayton Xzavier Wade (born September 8, 2000) is an American professional football wide receiver. He played college football for the Western Kentucky Hilltoppers and the Ole Miss Rebels.

== Early life ==
Coming out of high school, Wade was rated as a three star recruit when he committed to play college football for the Western Kentucky Hilltoppers.

== College career ==
In Wade's first collegiate season in 2019 at Western Kentucky, he hauled in one reception for ten yards. During the 2020 season, Wade hauled in 22 receptions for 190 yards. In the 2021 season, Wade played in just three game, recording no statistics before suffering an injury. After the conclusion of the 2021 season, Wade entered the NCAA transfer portal.

Wade transferred to play for the Ole Miss Rebels as a walk-on. In the 2022 season, Wade totaled 27 receptions for 309 yards and three touchdowns. In week ten of the 2023 season, Wade hauled in eight receptions for 120 yards and a touchdown in a win over Vanderbilt. During the 2023 season, Wade has a breakout season hauling in 55 receptions for 830 yards and four touchdowns. After the conclusion of the 2023 season, Wade declared for the 2024 NFL draft.

== Professional career ==
Pre-draft measurables
Height	Weight	Arm length	Hand span	Wingspan	40-yard dash	10-yard split	20-yard split	20-yard shuttle	Three-cone drill	Vertical jump	Broad jump	Bench press
5 ft 9 1/4 in (1.76 m)	176 lb (80 kg)	29 1/4 in (0.74 m)	9 3/8 in (0.24 m)	6 ft 0 7/8 in (1.85 m)	4.46 s	1.56 s	2.57 s	4.21 s	7.06 s	37.5 in (0.95 m)	10 ft 5 in (3.18 m)	11 reps
All values from Pro Day

=== Baltimore Ravens ===
After not being selected in the 2024 NFL draft, Wade signed with the Baltimore Ravens as an undrafted free agent. He was also selected by the Michigan Panthers in the sixth round of the 2024 UFL draft on July 17. He was waived by the Ravens on August 27 and re-signed to the practice squad.

Wade signed a reserve/future contract with Baltimore on January 21, 2025. In a preseason game against the Washington Commanders, Wade suffered a rib injury after taking a hit from Antonio Hamilton. After undergoing surgery, he was placed on season-ending injured reserve on August 26.

On March 10, 2026, Wade re-signed with the Ravens. He was waived on August 30 as part of final roster cuts.
