= Zach Evans =

American football player (born 2001)

No. 21, 38
- Position: Running back

Personal information
- Born: May 30, 2001 (age 25); Houston, Texas, U.S.
- Listed height: 5 ft 11 in (1.80 m)
- Listed weight: 202 lb (92 kg)

Career information
- High school: North Shore (Houston)
- College: TCU (2020–2021); Ole Miss (2022)
- NFL draft: 2023: 6th round, 215th overall pick

Career history
- Los Angeles Rams (2023); New York Jets (2024)*
- * Offseason or practice squad member only

Career NFL statistics
- Rushing yards: 19
- Rushing average: 2.1
- Stats at Pro Football Reference

Zachary Evans (born May 30, 2001) is an American former professional football player who was a running back in the National Football League (NFL). He played college football for the TCU Horned Frogs before playing one season with Ole Miss Rebels in 2022. Selected in the sixth round of the 2023 NFL draft by the Los Angeles Rams, he played one season for the franchise before being released prior to the start of the 2024 season.

== Early life ==
Evans went to North Shore High School in Houston, Texas. Evans was ranked as a five-star recruit and the number one player in the state of Texas in the 2020 class by 247Sports.com. He was compared to Melvin Gordon of the Denver Broncos. In 2019, Evans broke the team's cell phone rules. He was suspended and not allowed to play in the state championship game. Evans was committed to Georgia but this incident led him to be released from his NLI. Evans would eventually commit to Texas Christian University becoming the school's first ever five-star recruit.

== College career ==
=== TCU ===
As a freshman in 2020, Evans played in nine games totaling 415 yards and four touchdowns.

In 2021, Evans played in just six games recording 648 yards and five touchdowns. Evan's season would be cut short due to a turf toe injury sustained in a game against Texas Tech.

=== Ole Miss ===
Evans transferred to Ole Miss in 2022 to play for the Ole Miss Rebels. He played one season there, rushing for 936 yards and nine touchdowns, and declared for the 2023 NFL draft following the season. He averaged the 10th-most yards per carry in the FBS at 6.5.

=== Collegiate statistics ===
Season	GP	Rushing				Receiving			
Season	GP	Att	Yds	Avg	TD	Rec	Yds	Avg	TD
2020	9	54	415	7.7	4	8	76	9.5	0
2021	6	92	648	7.0	5	10	130	13.0	1
2022	12	144	936	6.5	9	12	119	9.9	1
Career	27	290	1,999	6.9	18	30	325	10.8	2

== Professional career ==
Pre-draft measurables
Height	Weight	Arm length	Hand span	40-yard dash	10-yard split	20-yard split	20-yard shuttle	Three-cone drill	Vertical jump	Broad jump
5 ft 11 1/8 in (1.81 m)	202 lb (92 kg)	31 5/8 in (0.80 m)	10 1/4 in (0.26 m)	4.51 s	1.57 s	2.57 s	4.25 s	6.89 s	33.5 in (0.85 m)	10 ft 1 in (3.07 m)

=== Los Angeles Rams ===
Evans was selected by the Los Angeles Rams in the sixth round with the 215th overall pick in the 2023 NFL draft. He appeared in 10 games playing on offense and special teams during the regular season, carrying the ball nine times for 19 yards, but did not play in the Rams' playoff loss to the Detroit Lions.

Evans was cut by the Rams on August 27, 2024, then was re-signed to the team's practice squad a day later before being released again on August 29.

=== New York Jets ===
On December 17, 2024, Evans was signed to the New York Jets practice squad. He signed a reserve/future contract with the Jets on January 6, 2025. On July 28, Evans announced his retirement from football.

=== Professional statistics ===
Year	Team	Games		Rushing					Fumbles	
Year	Team	GP	GS	Att	Yds	Avg	Lng	TD	Fum	Lost
2023	LAR	10	0	9	19	2.1	5	0	0	0
Career		10	0	9	19	2.1	5	0	0	0
