= SaRodorick Thompson =

American football player (born 1999)

SaRodorick Thompson Jr.
Profile
- Position: Running back

Personal information
- Born: October 1, 1999 (age 27); Irving, Texas, U.S.
- Listed height: 6 ft 0 in (1.83 m)
- Listed weight: 220 lb (100 kg)

Career information
- High school: Ranchview (Irving, Texas)
- College: Texas Tech (2018–2022)
- NFL draft: 2023: undrafted

Career history
- New Orleans Saints (2023)*; Seattle Seahawks (2023); Dallas Cowboys (2023)*; Los Angeles Rams (2024)*; Saskatchewan Roughriders (2024)*
- * Offseason or practice squad member only

Career NFL statistics as of 2023
- Games played: 1
- Stats at Pro Football Reference

SaRodorick Thompson Jr. (born October 1, 1999) is an American professional football running back who is signed by the Saskatchewan Roughriders in the Canadian Football League. He played college football at Texas Tech.

== Early life ==
Thompson attended Ranchview High School where he rushed for over 3,000 yards throughout his high school football career and was ranked 98th nationally by ESPN among running backs.

== Professional career ==
Pre-draft measurables
Height	Weight	Arm length	Hand span	40-yard dash	10-yard split	20-yard split	20-yard shuttle	Three-cone drill	Vertical jump	Broad jump
5 ft 11 1/2 in (1.82 m)	207 lb (94 kg)	31 5/8 in (0.80 m)	9 in (0.23 m)	4.65 s	1.65 s	2.63 s	4.64 s	7.25 s	32.5 in (0.83 m)	10 ft 0 in (3.05 m)
All values from NFL Combine/Pro Day

=== New Orleans Saints ===
On April 29, 2023, Thompson signed with the New Orleans Saints as an undrafted free agent.

=== Seattle Seahawks ===
On July 31, 2023, Thompson signed with the Seattle Seahawks. Thompson made his NFL debut in week eight of the 2023 season versus the Arizona Cardinals where he played two snaps. He was released on October 31. Thompson was re-signed to the practice squad on December 6. Thompson was later released on December 8 to make room for Sean Mannion.

=== Dallas Cowboys ===
On January 4, 2024, Thompson was signed to the Dallas Cowboys practice squad. He was not signed to a reserve/future contract after the season and thus became a free agent when his practice squad contract expired.

=== Los Angeles Rams ===
Thompson signed with the Los Angeles Rams on August 22, 2024, but was waived three days later.

=== Saskatchewan Roughriders ===
Thompson joined the Canadian Football League on August 27, 2024, signing with the Saskatchewan Roughriders.
