= 2021 Mississippi State Bulldogs football team =

American college football season

2021 Mississippi State Bulldogs football

Liberty Bowl, L 7–34 vs. Texas Tech
- Conference: Southeastern Conference
- Western Division
- Record: 7–6 (4–4 SEC)
- Head coach: Mike Leach (2nd season)
- Offensive scheme: Air raid
- Defensive coordinator: Zach Arnett (2nd season)
- Base defense: 3–3–5
- Home stadium: Davis Wade Stadium

2021 Southeastern Conference football standings
	Conf.			Overall
Team	W		L	W		L
Eastern Division
No. 1 Georgia x#^	8	–	0	14	–	1
No. 18 Kentucky*	5	–	3	10	–	3
Tennessee	4	–	4	7	–	6
Missouri	3	–	5	6	–	7
South Carolina	3	–	5	7	–	6
Florida	2	–	6	6	–	7
Vanderbilt	0	–	8	2	–	10
Western Division
No. 2 Alabama x$^	7	–	1	13	–	2
No. 11 Ole Miss	6	–	2	10	–	3
No. 21 Arkansas	4	–	4	9	–	4
Mississippi State	4	–	4	7	–	6
Texas A&M	4	–	4	8	–	4
Auburn	3	–	5	6	–	7
LSU	3	–	5	6	–	7
Championship: Alabama 41, Georgia 24
# – College Football Playoff champion; ^ – College Football Playoff participant; $ – Conference champion; x – Division champion/co-champions; * – Kentucky vacated all wins due to NCAA violations.; Rankings from AP Poll

The 2021 Mississippi State Bulldogs football team represented Mississippi State University in the 2021 NCAA Division I FBS football season. The Bulldogs played their home games at Davis Wade Stadium in Starkville, Mississippi, and competed in the Western Division of the Southeastern Conference (SEC). They were led by second-year head coach Mike Leach.

== Coaching staff ==
Staff from 2021.

Name	Position
Mike Leach	Head coach
Tony Hughes	Associate head coach & Nickelbacks Coach
Zach Arnett	Defensive coordinator & Linebackers coach
Matt Brock	Special teams coordinator & Outside Linebackers Coach
Darcel McBath	Cornerbacks coach
Eric Mele	Running backs coach
Mason Miller	Offensive line coach
Dave Nichol	Inside receivers coach
Jeff Phelps	Defensive line coach
Steve Spurrier Jr.	Outside receivers coach
Jason Washington	Safeties coach
Tyson Brown	Head strength and conditioning coach

== SEC Media Days ==
In the preseason media poll, Mississippi State was predicted to finish last in the West Division.

== Schedule ==
Date	Time	Opponent	Rank	Site	TV	Result	Attendance
September 4	3:00 p.m.	Louisiana Tech*		Davis Wade Stadium; Starkville, MS	ESPNU	W 35–34	44,669
September 11	6:00 p.m.	NC State*		Davis Wade Stadium; Starkville, MS	ESPN2	W 24–10	45,834
September 18	3:00 p.m.	at Memphis*		Liberty Bowl Memorial Stadium; Memphis, TN	ESPN2	L 29–31	43,461
September 25	11:00 a.m.	LSU		Davis Wade Stadium; Starkville, MS (rivalry)	ESPN	L 25–28	50,298
October 2	6:00 p.m.	at No. 15 Texas A&M		Kyle Field; College Station, TX	SECN	W 26–22	87,973
October 16	6:00 p.m.	No. 5 Alabama		Davis Wade Stadium; Starkville, MS (rivalry)	ESPN	L 9–49	53,796
October 23	3:00 p.m.	at Vanderbilt		Vanderbilt Stadium; Nashville, TN	SECN	W 45–6	22,036
October 30	6:00 p.m.	No. 12 Kentucky^{†}		Davis Wade Stadium; Starkville, MS	SECN	W 31–17	49,487
November 6	3:00 p.m.	at Arkansas	No. 17	Donald W. Reynolds Razorback Stadium; Fayetteville, AR	SECN	L 28–31	68,818
November 13	11:00 a.m.	at No. 17 Auburn		Jordan–Hare Stadium; Auburn, AL	ESPN	W 43–34	87,451
November 20	11:00 a.m.	Tennessee State*	No. 25	Davis Wade Stadium; Starkville, MS	ESPN+, SECN+	W 55–10	46,770
November 25	6:30 p.m.	No. 9 Ole Miss		Davis Wade Stadium; Starkville, MS (Egg Bowl)	ESPN	L 21–31	55,601
December 28	5:45 p.m.	vs. Texas Tech*		Liberty Bowl Memorial Stadium; Memphis, TN (Liberty Bowl)	ESPN	L 7–34	48,615
*Non-conference game; ^{†}Homecoming; Rankings from AP Poll (and CFP Rankings, after November 2) - Released prior to game; All times are in Central time

== Game summaries ==
=== Louisiana Tech ===
Team	1	2	3	4	Total
Louisiana Tech	7	14	10	3	34
• Mississippi State	14	0	0	21	35

- Date:
  September 4
- Location:
  Starkville, MS
- Game start:
  3:02 p.m.
- Game attendance: 44,669
- Game weather: 87, Sunny, Wind SE @ 3 mph
- Referee: James Carter
- TV announcers (ESPNU):
  John Schriffen (play-by-play) and Rene Ingoglia (analyst)

Statistics	LA Tech	MSU
First downs	14	22
Total yards	369	436
Rushing yards	101	66
Passing yards	268	371
Turnovers	2	4
Time of possession	27:40	32:20

Team	Category	Player	Statistics
Louisiana Tech	Passing	Austin Kendall	20/36, 269 yards, 2 TD, 1 INT
Louisiana Tech	Rushing	Austin Kendall	5 carries, 68 yards, 1 TD
Louisiana Tech	Receiving	Bub Means	2 receptions, 94 yards, 1 TD
Mississippi State	Passing	Will Rogers	39/47, 370 yards, 3 TD, 1 INT
Mississippi State	Rushing	Jo'Quavious Marks	12 carries, 71 yards, 2 TD’S
Mississippi State	Receiving	Jamire Calvin	3 receptions, 67 yards, 1 TD

=== NC State ===
Team	1	2	3	4	Total
NC State	0	3	0	7	10
• Mississippi State	7	7	7	3	24

- Date:
  September 11
- Location:
  Starkville, MS
- Game start:
  6:05 p.m.
- Game attendance: 45,834
- Game weather: 83, Sunny, Wind SE @ 4 mph
- Referee: Jerry Magallanes
- TV announcers (ESPN2):
  Anish Shroff (play-by-play), Mike Golic Jr. (analyst), and Taylor McGregor (sideline)

Scoring summary
1	14:47	MSSU	Lideatrick Griffin 100 yard kickoff return (Brandon Ruiz kick)	MSSU 7–0
2	12:46	NCSU	Christopher Dunn 45 yard field goal (11 plays, 43 yards, 5:25)	MSSU 7–3
2	1:09	MSSU	Malik Heath 21 yard pass from Will Rogers (Brandon Ruiz kick) (13 plays, 83 yards, 4:30)	MSSU 14–3
3	0:48	MSSU	Jaden Walley 4 yard pass from Will Rogers (Nolan McCord kick) (7 plays, 54 yards, 4:12)	MSSU 21–3
4	12:30	MSSU	Nolan McCord 32 yard field goal (8 plays, 51 yards, 2:23)	MSSU 24–3
4	1:06	NCSU	Thayer Thomas 4 yard pass from Devin Leary (Christopher Dunn kick) (8 plays, 74 yards, 3:16)	MSSU 24–10

Statistics	NC State	MSU
First downs	16	15
Total yards	335	316
Rushing yards	32	22
Passing yards	303	294
Turnovers	3	0
Time of possession	28:54	31:06

Team	Category	Player	Statistics
NC State	Passing	Devin Leary	30/49, 303 yards, 1 TD, 1 INT
NC State	Rushing	Zonovan Knight	8 carries, 31 yards
NC State	Receiving	Emeka Emezie	6 receptions, 92 yards
Mississippi State	Passing	Will Rogers	33/49, 294 yards, 2 TD's
Mississippi State	Rushing	Dillon Johnson	6 carries, 18 yards
Mississippi State	Receiving	Dillon Johnson	6 receptions, 70 yards

=== At Memphis ===
Team	1	2	3	4	Total
Mississippi State	3	14	0	12	29
• Memphis	7	0	7	17	31

- Date:
  September 18
- Location:
  Memphis, TN
- Game start:
  3:05 p.m.
- Game attendance: 43,461
- Game weather: 77, Cloudy, Wind NE @ 7 mph
- Referee: Marc Curles
- TV announcers (ESPN2):
  Beth Mowins (play-by-play), Kirk Morrison (analyst), and Dawn Davenport (field)

Scoring summary
1	12:02	MEM	Sanchez Blake Jr. 49-yard fumble returned (Joe Doyle kick) (5 plays, 21 yards, 2:58)	MEM 7–0
1	03:20	MSST	Nolan McCord 39-yard field goal (17 plays, 54 yards, 8:42)	MEM 7–3
2	09:58	MSST	Dillon Johnson 3-yard rush (Nolan McCord kick) (10 plays, 75 yards, 4:28)	MSST 10–7
2	05:07	MSST	Jaden Walley 6-yard pass from Will Rogers (Nolan McCord kick) (9 plays, 81 yards, 3:41)	MSST 17–7
3	06:20	MEM	Calvin Austin III 21-yard pass from Seth Henigan (Joe Doyle kick) (12 plays, 98 yards, 4:59)	MSST 17–14
4	07:48	MEM	Calvin Austin III 25-yard pass from Seth Henigan (Joe Doyle kick) (4 plays, 36 yards, 1:18)	MEM 21–17
4	05:36	MEM	Calvin Austin III 94-yard punt return (Joe Doyle kick) (5 plays, 22 yards, 2:12)	MEM 28–17
4	03:03	MSST	Malik Heath 9-yard pass from Will Rogers (two-point pass conversion attempt failed) (6 plays, 57 yards, 2:33)	MEM 28–23
4	02:02	MEM	Joe Doyle 51-yard field goal (4 plays, 4 yards, 1:01)	MEM 31–23
4	01:32	MSST	Makai Polk 36-yard pass from Will Rogers (2 plays, 65 yards, 0:30)	MEM 31–29

Statistics	MSU	Memphis
First downs	26	12
Total yards	468	246
Rushing yards	49	87
Passing yards	419	159
Turnovers	1	1
Time of possession	40:33	19:27

Team	Category	Player	Statistics
Mississippi State	Passing	Will Rogers	50/67, 419 yards, 3 TD
Mississippi State	Rushing	Dillon Johnson	7 carries, 49 yards, 1 TD
Mississippi State	Receiving	Makai Polk	11 receptions, 136 yards, 1 TD
Memphis	Passing	Seth Henigan	16/28, 159 yards, 2 TD, 1 INT
Memphis	Rushing	Brandon Thomas	16 carries, 86 yards
Memphis	Receiving	Calvin Austin	9 receptions, 105 yards, 2 TD

=== LSU ===
Team	1	2	3	4	Total
• LSU	7	0	14	7	28
Mississippi State	0	3	7	15	25

- Date:
  September 25
- Location:
  Starkville, MS
- Game start:
  11:07 a.m.
- Game attendance: 50,298
- Game weather: 74, Sunny, Wind NW @ 2 mph
- Referee: Alex Moore
- TV announcers (ESPN):
  Bob Wischusen (play-by-play), Dan Orlovsky (analyst), and Kris Budden (sideline reporter)

Statistics	LSU	MSU
First downs	15	29
Total yards	343	486
Rushing yards	63	115
Passing yards	280	371
Turnovers	1	2
Time of possession	24:52	35:08

Team	Category	Player	Statistics
LSU	Passing	Max Johnson	17/27, 280 yards, 4 TD, 1 INT
LSU	Rushing	Tyrion Davis-Price	13 carries, 51 yards
LSU	Receiving	Kayshon Boutte	4 receptions, 85 yards, 2 TD
Mississippi State	Passing	Will Rogers	47/62, 371 yards, 3 TD, 1 INT
Mississippi State	Rushing	Dillon Johnson	8 carries, 51 yards
Mississippi State	Receiving	Makai Polk	8 receptions, 78 yards, 1 TD

=== At No. 15 Texas A&M ===
Team	1	2	3	4	Total
• Mississippi State	10	7	7	2	26
No. 15 Texas A&M	7	6	6	3	22

- Date:
  October 2
- Location:
  College Station, TX
- Game start:
  6:07 p.m.
- Game attendance: 87,973
- Game weather: Sunny
- Referee: Lee Hedrick
- TV announcers (SECN): Tom Hart (play-by-play), Jordan Rodgers (color) and Cole Cubelic (sideline)

Statistics	MSU	Texas A&M
First downs	27	15
Total yards	438	297
Rushing yards	30	162
Passing yards	408	135
Turnovers	0	1
Time of possession	35:06	24:54

Team	Category	Player	Statistics
Mississippi State	Passing	Will Rogers	46/59, 408 yards, 3 TD
Mississippi State	Rushing	Dillon Johnson	6 carries, 19 yards
Mississippi State	Receiving	Makai Polk	13 receptions, 126 yards, 2 TD
Texas A&M	Passing	Zach Calzada	12/20, 135 yards, 1 TD, 1 INT
Texas A&M	Rushing	Isaiah Spiller	16 carries, 100 yards
Texas A&M	Receiving	Jalen Preston	2 receptions, 49 yards

=== No. 5 Alabama ===
Team	1	2	3	4	Total
• No. 5 Alabama	14	7	14	14	49
Mississippi State	3	3	3	0	9

- Date:
  October 16
- Location:
  Starkville, MS
- Game start:
  6:11 p.m.
- Game attendance: 53,796
- Game weather: 63, Sunny, Wind N @ 7 mph
- Referee: Matt Loeffler
- TV announcers (ESPN): Joe Tessitore (play-by-play), Greg McElroy (analyst) and Katie George (sideline)

Statistics	Alabama	MSU
First downs	22	24
Total yards	543	299
Rushing yards	195	-1
Passing yards	348	300
Turnovers	0	3
Time of possession	29:53	30:07

Team	Category	Player	Statistics
Alabama	Passing	Bryce Young	20/28, 348 yards, 4 TD
Alabama	Rushing	Roydell Williams	11 carries, 78 yards
Alabama	Receiving	John Metchie III	7 receptions, 117 yards, 1 TD
Mississippi State	Passing	Will Rogers	35/55, 300 yards, 3 INT
Mississippi State	Rushing	Dillon Johnson	7 carries, 24 yards
Mississippi State	Receiving	Jaden Walley	6 receptions, 64 yards

=== At Vanderbilt ===
Team	1	2	3	4	Total
• Mississippi State	10	14	7	14	45
Vanderbilt	0	3	3	0	6

- Date:
  October 23
- Location:
  Nashville, TN
- Game start: 3:01 p.m.
- Game attendance: 22,036
- Game weather: Sunny
- Referee: Ken Williamson
- TV announcers (SECN): Taylor Zarzour (play-by-play), Matt Stinchcomb (analyst) and Alyssa Lang (sideline reporter)

Statistics	MSU	Vanderbilt
First downs	29	5
Total yards	522	155
Rushing yards	61	9
Passing yards	461	146
Turnovers	2	1
Time of possession	39:02	20:58

Team	Category	Player	Statistics
Mississippi State	Passing	Will Rogers	41/57, 384 yards, 4 TD, 2 INT
Mississippi State	Rushing	Dillon Johnson	7 carries, 34 yards
Mississippi State	Receiving	Jaden Walley	5 receptions, 72 yards
Vanderbilt	Passing	Mike Wright	12/17, 122 yards, 1 INT
Vanderbilt	Rushing	Rocko Griffin	7 carries, 12 yards
Vanderbilt	Receiving	Devin Boddie Jr.	4 receptions, 69 yards

=== No. 12 Kentucky ===
Team	1	2	3	4	Total
No. 12 Kentucky	7	3	0	7	17
• Mississippi State	0	14	17	0	31

- Date:
  October 30
- Location:
  Starkville, MS
- Game start: 6:09 p.m.
- Game attendance: 49,487
- Game weather: 55, Cloudy, Wind NW @ 5 mph
- Referee: Lee Hendrick
- TV announcers (SECN): Tom Hart (play-by-play), Jordan Rodgers (analyst), Cole Cubelic (sideline)

Statistics	Kentucky	MSU
First downs	14	27
Total yards	216	438
Rushing yards	66	94
Passing yards	150	344
Turnovers	4	0
Time of possession	18:50	41:10

Team	Category	Player	Statistics
Kentucky	Passing	Will Levis	17/28, 150 yards, 1 TD, 3 INT
Kentucky	Rushing	Chris Rodriguez Jr.	8 carries, 34 yards
Kentucky	Receiving	Wan'Dale Robinson	9 receptions, 79 yards
Mississippi State	Passing	Will Rogers	36/39, 344 yards, 1 TD
Mississippi State	Rushing	Jo’Quavious Marks	20 carries, 58 yards, 1 TD
Mississippi State	Receiving	Jaden Walley	6 receptions, 95 yards

=== At Arkansas ===
Team	1	2	3	4	Total
No. 17 Mississippi State	0	7	7	14	28
• Arkansas	10	3	3	15	31

- Date:
  November 6
- Location:
  Fayetteville, AR
- Game start: 3:01 p.m.
- Game attendance: 68,818
- Game weather: 62, Sunny, Wind SW @ 4 mph
- Referee: Jason Autrey
- TV announcers (SECN): Tom Hart (play-by-play), Jordan Rodgers (analyst), Cole Cubelic (sideline)

Statistics	MSU	Arkansas
First downs	28	23
Total yards	486	393
Rushing yards	69	202
Passing yards	417	191
Turnovers	1	0
Time of possession	32:14	27:46

Team	Category	Player	Statistics
Mississippi State	Passing	Will Rogers	36/48, 417 yards, 4 TD, 1 INT
Mississippi State	Rushing	Jo'Quavious Marks	11 carries, 40 yards
Mississippi State	Receiving	Makai Polk	8 receptions, 117 yards
Arkansas	Passing	KJ Jefferson	19/23, 191 yards, 1 TD
Arkansas	Rushing	Dominique Johnson	17 carries, 107 yards, 2 TD
Arkansas	Receiving	Treylon Burks	6 receptions, 82 yards, 1 TD

=== At No. 17 Auburn ===
Team	1	2	3	4	Total
• Mississippi State	3	7	13	20	43
No. 17 Auburn	14	14	0	6	34

- Date:
  November 13
- Location:
  Auburn, AL
- Game start: 11:07 a.m.
- Game attendance: 87,451
- Game weather: 55, Sunny, Wind NW @ 10 mph
- Referee: Steve Marlowe
- TV announcers (ESPN): Bob Wischusen (play-by-play), Jordan Rodgers (analyst), Kris Budden (sideline reporter)

Statistics	MSU	Auburn
First downs	31	22
Total yards	487	483
Rushing yards	72	106
Passing yards	415	377
Turnovers	0	1
Time of possession	35:01	24:59

Team	Category	Player	Statistics
Mississippi State	Passing	Will Rogers	44/55, 415 yards, 6 TD
Mississippi State	Rushing	Dillon Johnson	8 carries, 62 yards
Mississippi State	Receiving	Jaden Walley	7 receptions, 87 yards
Auburn	Passing	Bo Nix	27/41, 377 yards, 2 TD
Auburn	Rushing	Ja'Varrius Johnson	1 carries, 57 yards, 1 TD
Auburn	Receiving	Kobe Hudson	8 receptions, 107 yards, 1 TD

=== Tennessee State ===
Team	1	2	3	4	Total
Tennessee State	0	0	0	10	10
• No. 25 Mississippi State	21	14	14	6	55

- Date:
  November 20
- Location:
  Starkville, MS
- Game start: 11:02 a.m.
- Game attendance: 46,770
- Game weather: 55, Sunny, Wind SE @ 8 mph
- Referee: Daniel Gautreaux
- TV announcers (ESPN+/SECN+): Mike Couzens (play-by-play), Dustin Fox (analyst)

Statistics	Tenn State	MSU
First downs	14	23
Total yards	205	600
Rushing yards	35	107
Passing yards	170	493
Turnovers	1	2
Time of possession	35:20	24:40

Team	Category	Player	Statistics
Tennessee State	Passing	Deveon Bryant	9/11, 128 yards
Tennessee State	Rushing	Devon Starling	11 carries, 33 yards
Tennessee State	Receiving	Cam Wyche	4 receptions, 88 yards
Mississippi State	Passing	Will Rogers	28/34, 391 yards, 5 TD
Mississippi State	Rushing	Dillon Johnson	5 carries, 56 yards, 1 TD
Mississippi State	Receiving	Makai Polk	9 receptions, 110 yards, 1 TD

=== No. 9 Ole Miss ===
Egg Bowl

Team	1	2	3	4	Total
• No. 9 Ole Miss	3	7	7	14	31
Mississippi State	6	0	0	15	21

- Date: November 25
- Location: Starkville, MS
- Game start: 6:33 p.m.
- Game attendance: 55,601
- Game weather: Rain • Temperature: 55 °F (13 °C)
- Referee: Ken Williamson
- TV announcers (ESPN): Joe Tessitore (play-by-play), Greg McElroy (analyst) and Katie George (sideline)

Statistics	Ole Miss	MSU
First downs	23	30
Total yards	388	420
Rushing yards	154	84
Passing yards	234	336
Turnovers	1	0
Time of possession	30:16	29:44

Team	Category	Player	Statistics
Ole Miss	Passing	Matt Corral	26/34, 234 yards, 1 TD, 1 INT
Ole Miss	Rushing	Jerrion Ealy	16 carries, 60 yards
Ole Miss	Receiving	Dontario Drummond	14 receptions, 138 yards
Mississippi State	Passing	Will Rogers	38/58, 336 yards, 1 TD
Mississippi State	Rushing	Jo'Quavious Marks	8 carries, 45 yards, 1 TD
Mississippi State	Receiving	Makai Polk	10 receptions, 98 yards

=== Vs. Texas Tech ===
AutoZone Liberty Bowl

Team	1	2	3	4	Total
• Texas Tech	10	3	14	7	34
Mississippi State	0	7	0	0	7

- Date: December 28
- Location: Memphis, TN
- Game start: 5:45 pm CST
- Game attendance: 48,615
- Game weather: Temperature: 69 °F (21 °C) • Weather: Cloudy • Wind: S 10 MPH
- Referee: Riley Jefferson
- TV announcers (ESPN): Dave Neal (play-by-play), Deuce McAllister (analyst), Andraya Carter (sideline)

Statistics	TTU	MSU
First downs	24	21
Total yards	512	344
Rushing yards	260	54
Passing yards	252	290
Turnovers	0	3
Time of possession	30:57	28:41

Team	Category	Player	Statistics
Texas Tech	Passing	Donovan Smith	15/28, 252 yards, 1 TD
Texas Tech	Rushing	Tahj Brooks	16 rushes, 107 yards, 1 TD
Texas Tech	Receiving	Myles Price	3 receptions, 72 yards
Mississippi State	Passing	Will Rogers	32/53, 290 yards, 1 TD, 1 INT
Mississippi State	Rushing	Dillon Johnson	9 rushes, 62 yards
Mississippi State	Receiving	Austin Williams	5 receptions, 74 yards

== Rankings ==
Ranking movements Legend: ██ Increase in ranking ██ Decrease in ranking — = Not ranked RV = Received votes
	Week															
Poll	Pre	1	2	3	4	5	6	7	8	9	10	11	12	13	14	Final
AP	—	—	—	—	—	RV	RV	—	—	RV	—	RV	RV	RV	RV	—
Coaches	RV	—	RV	—	—	RV	RV	—	—	RV	—	RV	RV	RV	RV	—
CFP	Not released									17	—	25	—	—	—	Not released

== Statistics ==
=== Scoring ===
==== Scores by quarter (non-conference opponents) ====
	1	2	3	4	Total
All opponents	14	17	17	37	85
Mississippi State	45	35	21	42	143

==== Scores by quarter (SEC opponents) ====
	1	2	3	4	Total
SEC opponents	62	43	47	66	218
Mississippi State	32	55	61	80	228

=== Team statistics ===
Team Statistics
	Opponents	Mississippi State
Total Points	303	371
Points per game	25.6	30.9
Rushing yards per game	101	64
Passing yards per game	230.1	385.8

== Players drafted into the NFL ==
Mississippi State had two players selected in the 2022 NFL draft.

Round	Pick	Player	Position	NFL club
1	9	Charles Cross	OT	Seattle Seahawks
3	68	Martin Emerson	CB	Cleveland Browns
