= 2023 Houston Cougars football team =

American college football season

2023 Houston Cougars football
- Conference: Big 12 Conference
- Record: 4–8 (2–7 Big 12)
- Head coach: Dana Holgorsen (5th season)
- Offensive coordinator: Eman Naghavi (1st season)
- Offensive scheme: Spread
- Defensive coordinator: Doug Belk (5th season)
- Base defense: 4–2–5
- Home stadium: TDECU Stadium

2023 Big 12 Conference football standings
	Conf.			Overall
Team	W		L	W		L
No. 3 Texas y$^	8	–	1	12	–	2
No. 16 Oklahoma State y	7	–	2	10	–	4
No. 15 Oklahoma	7	–	2	10	–	3
Iowa State	6	–	3	7	–	6
No. 18 Kansas State	6	–	3	9	–	4
West Virginia	6	–	3	9	–	4
Texas Tech	5	–	4	7	–	6
No. 23 Kansas	5	–	4	9	–	4
UCF	3	–	6	6	–	7
TCU	3	–	6	5	–	7
Houston	2	–	7	4	–	8
BYU	2	–	7	5	–	7
Baylor	2	–	7	3	–	9
Cincinnati	1	–	8	3	–	9
Championship: Texas 49, Oklahoma State 21
^ – College Football Playoff participant; $ – Conference champion; y – Championship game participant; Rankings from AP Poll

The 2023 Houston Cougars football team represented the University of Houston in the Big 12 Conference during the 2023 NCAA Division I FBS football season. The Cougars were led by Dana Holgorsen in his fifth season as their head coach. The Cougars played their home games at TDECU Stadium in Houston, Texas.

In September 2021, Cincinnati, BYU, Houston, and UCF accepted bids to join the Big 12 Conference. On June 10, 2022, the American Athletic Conference and the three American Athletic Conference schools set to depart from the league (Cincinnati, Houston, and UCF) announced that they had reached a buyout agreement with the conference that would allow those schools to join the Big 12 in 2023. BYU had previously operated as an independent prior to accepting a membership invitation to join the Big 12.

On November 26, head coach Dana Holgorsen was fired. He finished with a record of 31–28 in five seasons.

== Schedule ==
Date	Time	Opponent	Site	TV	Result	Attendance
September 2	6:00 p.m.	UTSA*	TDECU Stadium; Houston, TX	FS1	W 17–14	37,862
September 9	6:00 p.m.	at Rice*	Rice Stadium; Houston, TX (rivalry)	NFLN	L 41–43 ^{2OT}	23,425
September 16	7:00 p.m.	TCU	TDECU Stadium; Houston, TX	FOX	L 13–36	36,049
September 23	6:00 p.m.	Sam Houston*	TDECU Stadium; Houston, TX	ESPN+	W 38–7	35,044
September 30	2:30 p.m.	at Texas Tech	Jones AT&T Stadium; Lubbock, TX (rivalry)	FS2	L 28–49	53,308
October 12	6:00 p.m.	West Virginia	TDECU Stadium; Houston, TX	FS1	W 41–39	32,152
October 21	3:00 p.m.	No. 8 Texas	TDECU Stadium; Houston, TX	FOX	L 24–31	42,812
October 28	11:00 a.m.	at Kansas State	Bill Snyder Family Football Stadium; Manhattan, KS	ESPN2	L 0–41	51,928
November 4	2:30 p.m.	at Baylor	McLane Stadium; Waco, TX (rivalry)	ESPN+	W 25–24 ^{OT}	41,180
November 11	6:00 p.m.	Cincinnati^{†}	TDECU Stadium; Houston, TX	FS1	L 14–24	34,312
November 18	3:00 p.m.	No. 23 Oklahoma State	TDECU Stadium; Houston, TX	ESPN2	L 30–43	33,906
November 25	11:00 a.m.	at UCF	FBC Mortgage Stadium; Orlando, FL	FS1	L 13–27	43,610
*Non-conference game; ^{†}Homecoming; Rankings from AP Poll (and CFP Rankings, after October 31) - Released prior to game; All times are in Central time

== Game summaries ==
=== UTSA ===
	1	2	3	4	Total
Roadrunners	7	0	0	7	14
Cougars	7	3	7	0	17

=== at Rice ===
Houston Cougars at Rice Owls – Game summary

Quarter	1	2	3	4	OT	2OT	Total
Cougars	0	7	0	21	7	6	41
Owls	21	7	0	0	7	8	43

at Rice Stadium, Houston, Texas

- Date: September 9
- Game time: 6:00 p.m. CDT
- Game weather: Sunny, 96 °F (36 °C)
- Game attendance: 23,425
- Referee: Derek Anderson
- TV announcers (NFLN): Doug Sherman and Tyoka Jackson

Game information
First quarter
- RICE – Luke McCaffrey 10-yard pass from JT Daniels (Tim Horn kick), 10:11. Owls 7–0. Drive: 10 plays, 78 yards, 4:44.
- RICE – Daelen Alexander 1-yard run (Tim Horn kick), 4:17. Owls 14–0. Drive: 7 plays, 39 yards, 4:08.
- RICE – Luke McCaffrey 32-yard pass from JT Daniels (Tim Horn kick), 3:00. Owls 21–0. Drive: 3 plays, 69 yards, 0:50.

Second quarter

- RICE – Braylen Walker 15-yard pass from JT Daniels (Tim Horn kick), 8:32. Owls 28–0. Drive: 11 plays, 92 yards, 6:14.
- HOU – Matthew Golden 10-yard pass from Donovan Smith (Jack Martin kick), 2:42. Owls 28–7. Drive: 11 plays, 74 yards, 5:45.

Third quarter

- No scoring plays

Fourth quarter

- HOU – Donovan Smith 1-yard run (Jack Martin kick), 14:05. Owls 28–14. Drive: 6 plays, 64 yards, 1:24.
- HOU – Stacy Sneed 14-yard run (Jack Martin kick), 3:46. Owls 28–21. Drive: 6 plays, 71 yards, 2:04.
- HOU – Donovan Smith 1-yard run (Jack Martin kick), 0:15. Tied 28–28. Drive: 8 plays, 40 yards, 2:34.

Overtime

- HOU – Matthew Golden 2-yard pass from Donovan Smith (Jack Martin kick). Cougars 35–28. Drive: 5 plays, 25 yards.
- RICE – Daelen Alexander 3-yard run (Tim Horn kick). Tied 35–35. Drive: 5 plays, 25 yards.

Second overtime

- RICE – Daelen Alexander 1-yard run (Daelen Alexander run). Owls 43–35. Drive: 4 plays, 25 yards.
- HOU – Donovan Smith 2-yard run (pass failed). Owls 43–41. Drive: 5 plays, 25 yards.

Statistics	HOU	RICE
First downs	27	24
Total yards	443	470
Rushing yards	183	69
Passing yards	260	401
Turnovers	1	2
Time of possession	28:10	31:50

Team	Category	Player	Statistics
Houston	Passing	Donovan Smith	24/42, 260 yards, 2 TD, INT
Houston	Rushing	Tony Mathis Jr.	8 rushes, 60 yards
Houston	Receiving	Samuel Brown	9 receptions, 138 yards
Rice	Passing	JT Daniels	28/42, 401 yards, 3 TD, INT
Rice	Rushing	Dean Connors	8 rushes, 48 yards
Rice	Receiving	Luke McCaffrey	7 receptions, 99 yards, 2 TD

=== TCU ===
	1	2	3	4	Total
Horned Frogs	7	13	9	7	36
Cougars	3	10	0	0	13

=== Sam Houston ===
Sam Houston State Bearkats at Houston Cougars – Game summary

Quarter	1	2	3	4	Total
Bearkats	7	0	0	0	7
Cougars	10	14	7	7	38

at TDECU Stadium, Houston, Texas

- Date: September 23
- Game time: 6:00 p.m. CDT
- Game weather: Sunny, 94 °F (34 °C)
- Game attendance: 35,044
- Referee: Tutashinda Salaam
- TV announcers (ESPN+): Mark Neely, Ryan Leaf, and Shane Sparks

Game information
First quarter
- HOU – Jack Martin 23-yard field goal, 9:05. Cougars 3–0. Drive: 13 plays, 69 yards, 5:55.
- SHSU – Trapper Pannell 2-yard run (Colby Sessums kick), 6:02. Bearkats 7–3. Drive: 7 plays, 83 yards, 2:58.
- HOU – Parker Jenkins 4-yard run (Jack Martin kick), 1:47. Cougars 10–7. Drive: 9 plays, 72 yards, 4:08.

Second quarter

- HOU – Parker Jenkins 1-yard run (Jack Martin kick), 7:22. Cougars 17–7. Drive: 9 plays, 78 yards, 4:13.
- HOU – Parker Jenkins 2-yard run (Jack Martin kick), 0:49. Cougars 24–7. Drive: 8 plays, 56 yards, 1:17.

Third quarter

- HOU – Matthew Golden 6-yard pass from Donovan Smith (Jack Martin kick), 2:59. Cougars 31–7. Drive: 15 plays, 86 yards, 8:42.

Fourth quarter

- HOU – Stacy Sneed 58-yard pass from Ui Ale (Jack Martin kick), 10:06. Cougars 38–7. Drive: 1 play, 58 yards, 0:10.

Statistics	SHSU	HOU
First downs	8	27
Total yards	178	538
Rushing yards	52	186
Passing yards	126	352
Turnovers	2	0
Time of possession	25:05	34:55

Team	Category	Player	Statistics
Sam Houston State	Passing	Grant Gunnell	14/22, 100 yards, INT
Sam Houston State	Rushing	Tobias Weaver	6 rushes, 18 yards
Sam Houston State	Receiving	John Gentry	5 receptions, 32 yards
Houston	Passing	Donovan Smith	31/40, 294 yards, TD
Houston	Rushing	Parker Jenkins	20 rushes, 105 yards, 3 TD
Houston	Receiving	Matthew Golden	9 receptions, 92 yards, TD

=== at Texas Tech ===
Houston Cougars at Texas Tech Red Raiders – Game summary

Quarter	1	2	3	4	Total
Cougars	14	14	0	0	28
Red Raiders	14	21	7	7	49

at Jones AT&T Stadium, Lubbock, Texas

- Date: September 30
- Game time: 2:30 p.m. CDT
- Game weather: Sunny, 85 °F (29 °C)
- Game attendance: 53,308
- Referee: David Alvarez
- TV announcers (FS2): Dan Hellie and Petros Papadakis

Game information

First quarter

- HOU – Bryan Henry 6-yard pass from Donovan Smith (Jack Martin kick), 8:40. Cougars 7–0. Drive: 12 plays, 75 yards, 6:20.
- TTU – Drae McCray 100-yard kickoff return (Gino Garcia kick), 8:25. Tied 7–7.
- HOU – Samuel Brown 16-yard pass from Donovan Smith (Jack Martin kick), 6:15. Cougars 14–7. Drive: 6 plays, 75 yards, 2:10.
- TTU – Tahj Brooks 7-yard run (Gino Garcia kick), 1:25. Tied 14–14. Drive: 12 plays, 74 yards, 4:50.

Second quarter

- HOU – Joseph Manjack IV 49-yard pass from Donovan Smith (Jack Martin kick), 13:45. Cougars 21–14. Drive: 5 plays, 75 yards, 2:40.
- TTU – Loic Fouonji 25-yard pass from Behren Morton (Gino Garcia kick), 8:47. Tied 21–21. Drive: 13 plays, 75 yards, 4:58.
- TTU – Loic Fouonji 7-yard blocked punt return (Gino Garcia kick), 7:18. Red Raiders 28–21.
- HOU – Dalton Carnes 41-yard pass from Donovan Smith (Jack Martin kick), 2:16. Tied 28–28. Drive: 9 plays, 75 yards, 5:02.
- TTU – Tahj Brooks 1-yard run (Gino Garcia kick), 0:44. Red Raiders 35–28. Drive: 8 plays, 75 yards, 1:32.

Third quarter

- TTU – Myles Price 11-yard pass from Behren Morton (Gino Garcia kick), 9:22. Red Raiders 42–28. Drive: 3 plays, 80 yards, 0:48.

Fourth quarter

- TTU – Cam'Ron Valdez 41-yard run (Gino Garcia kick), 8:47. Red Raiders 49–28. Drive: 5 plays, 55 yards, 3:07.

Top passers

- HOU – Donovan Smith – 29/40, 335 yards, 4 TD
- TTU – Behren Morton – 14/22, 161 yards, 2 TD

Top rushers

- HOU – Parker Jenkins – 13 rushes, 71 yards
- TTU – Tahj Brooks – 22 rushes, 106 yards, 2 TD

Top receivers

- HOU – Samuel Brown – 9 receptions, 113 yards, TD
- TTU – Myles Price – 5 receptions, 63 yards, TD

=== West Virginia ===
West Virginia Mountaineers at Houston Cougars– Game summary

Quarter	1	2	3	4	Total
Mountaineers	10	0	7	22	39
Cougars	7	7	7	20	41

at TDECU Stadium, Houston, TX

- Date: October 12
- Game time: 7:00 p.m.
- Game weather: Cloudy, 79 °F (26 °C), SE 15 miles per hour (24 km/h)
- Game attendance: 32,152
- Referee: Stephen Baron
- TV announcers (FS1): Tim Brando, Spencer Tillman
- Gamecast

Game information

First Quarter

- (4:16) WVU - Michael Hayes 27 yard field goal (Drive: 16 plays, 82 yards, 7:51, WVU 3-0)
- (4:03) HOU - Matthew Golden 100 yard kickoff return, Jack Martin kick (HOU 7-3)
- (0:13) WVU - CJ Donaldson 5 yard run, Michael Hayes kick (Drive: 8 plays 69 yards, 3:05, WVU 10-7)

Second Quarter

- (0:28) HOU - Donovan Smith 2 yard run, Jack Martin kick (Drive: 8 plays, 56 yards, 1:26, HOU 14-10)

Third Quarter

- (13:06) WVU - Traylon Ray 35 yard pass from Garrett Greene, Michael Hayes kick (Drive: 4 plays, 56 yards, 1:47, WVU 17-14)
- (5:15) HOU - Joseph Manjack IV 15 yard pass from Donovan Smith, Jack Martin kick (Drive: 4 plays, 80 yards, 2:32, HOU 21-17)

Fourth Quarter

- (14:16) WVU - Garrett Greene 1 yard run, Michael Hayes kick (Drive: 11 plays, 78 yards, 2:32, WVU 24-21)
- (12:02) HOU - Samuel Brown 8 yard pass from Donovan Smith, Jack Martin kick (Drive: 4 plays, 66 yards, 2:06, HOU 28-24)
- (7:28) HOU - Stephon Johnson Jr 21 yard pass from Donovan Smith, Jack Martin kick (Drive: 6 plays, 59 yards, 3:24, HOU 35-24)
- (3:42) WVU - Garrett Greene 8 yard run, Traylon Ray pass 2 point conversion (Drive: 11 plays, 75 yards, 3:46, HOU 35-32)
- (00:12) WVU - Hudson Clement 50 yard pass from Garrett Greene, Michael Hayes kick (Drive: 7 plays, 88 yards, 1:05, WVU 39-35)
- (00:00) HOU - Stephon Johnson Jr. 49 yard pass from Donovan Smith (Drive: 2 plays, 57 yards, 0:07, HOU 41-39)

Statistics	WVU	Houston
First downs	26	20
Total yards	546	393
Rushes/yards	44/155	26/140
Passing yards	391	253
Passing Comp-Att-Int	20-38-1	21-27-0
Time of possession	36:59	23:01

Team	Category	Player	Statistics
West Virginia	Passing	Garrett Greene	20/38, 391 yards, 2 TD, INT
West Virginia	Rushing	CJ Donaldson	17 carries, 66 yards, TD
West Virginia	Receiving	Devin Carter	5 receptions, 116 yards
Houston	Passing	Donovan Smith	21/27, 253 yards, 4 TD
Houston	Rushing	Stacy Sneed	7 carries, 78 yards
Houston	Receiving	Stephon Johnson	4 receptions, 98 yards, 2 TD

=== No. 8 Texas ===
Team	1	2	3	4	Total
• No. 8 Texas	14	7	3	7	31
Houston	0	14	7	3	24

- Date: October 21, 2023
- Location: TDECU Stadium (Houston, TX)
- Game start: 3:05 p.m.
- Game attendance: 42,812
- Game weather: Sunny, 93 °F (34 °C), wind SW at 5 mph (8.0 km/h)
- Referee: Michael VanderVelde
- TV announcers (FOX): Tim Brando and Spencer Tillman

Statistics	Texas	Houston
First downs	19	20
Plays–yards	69–360	65–392
Rushes–yards	37–141	19–14
Passing yards	219	378
Passing: comp–att–int	25–32–0	32–46–1
Turnovers		
Time of possession	31:58	28:02

Team	Category	Player	Statistics
Texas	Passing	Quinn Ewers	23–29, 211 yards, 2 TD
Texas	Rushing	Jonathon Brooks	20 carries, 99 yards
Texas	Receiving	Xavier Worthy	6 receptions, 92 yards, 1 TD
Houston	Passing	Donovan Smith	32–46, 378 yards, 3 TD, 1 INT
Houston	Rushing	Parker Jenkins	9 carries, 23 yards
Houston	Receiving	Joseph Manjack IV	6 receptions, 88 yards, 1 TD

Scoring summary

Quarter	Time	Drive			Team	Scoring information	Score	
Quarter	Time	Plays	Yards	TOP	Team	Scoring information	Texas	Houston
1st	10:02	11	75	04:58	Texas	Adonai Mitchell 14-yard touchdown reception from Quinn Ewers, Bert Auburn kick good	7	0
1st	06:56	4	62	01:36	Texas	Xavier Worthy 42-yard touchdown reception from Quinn Ewers, Bert Auburn kick good	14	0
2nd	12:49	9	58	04:31	Texas	Savion Red 1-yard touchdown run, Bert Auburn kick good	21	0
2nd	06:07	4	71	01:26	Houston	Matthew Golden 32-yard touchdown reception from Donovan Smith, Jack Martin kick good	21	7
2nd	00:26	9	75	02:07	Houston	Joseph Manjack IV 21-yard touchdown reception from Donovan Smith, Jack Martin kick good	21	14
3rd	12:29	6	49	02:24	Houston	Matthew Golden 3-yard touchdown reception from Donovan Smith, Jack Martin kick good	21	21
3rd	03:17	11	31	03:49	Texas	25-yard field goal by Bert Auburn	24	21
4th	07:43	7	68	03:49	Houston	40-yard field goal by Jack Martin	24	24
4th	05:37	6	53	01:58	Texas	CJ Baxter 16-yard touchdown run, Bert Auburn kick good	31	24
"TOP" = time of possession. For other American football terms, see Glossary of American football.							31	24

=== at Kansas State ===
	1	2	3	4	Total
Cougars	0	0	0	0	0
Wildcats	7	21	7	6	41

=== at Baylor ===
Houston Cougars (3–5) vs. Baylor Bears (3–5)

Quarter	1	2	3	4	OT	Total
Houston	0	7	3	7	8	25
Baylor	0	0	7	10	7	24

at McLane Stadium • Waco, TX

- Date: Saturday, November 4, 2023
- Game time: 2:30 p.m. CDT
- Game weather: sunny • Temperature: 73°F
- Game attendance: 41,180
- Referee: Derek Anderson
- TV: ESPN+

Scoring summary

Quarter	Time	Drive			Team	Scoring information	Score	
Quarter	Time	Plays	Yards	TOP	Team	Scoring information	Houston	Baylor
2nd	08:03	3	44	01:11	Houston	Samuel Brown 26-yard touchdown reception from Donovan Smith, Jack Martin kick good	7	0
3rd	06:16	14	67	08:44	Houston	31-yard field goal by Jack Martin	10	0
3rd	02:20	8	75	03:56	Baylor	Drake Dabney 38-yard touchdown reception from Blake Shapen, Isaiah Hankins kick good	10	7
4th	08:18	12	69	06:54	Baylor	27-yard field goal by Isaiah Hankins	10	10
4th	05:38	5	75	02:40	Houston	Tony Mathis Jr. 24-yard touchdown reception from Donovan Smith, Jack Martin kick good	17	10
4th	00:29	11	74	02:22	Baylor	Hawkins Polley 1-yard touchdown reception from Blake Shapen, Isaiah Hankins kick good	17	17
OT	–	4	25	–	Baylor	Dawson Pendergrass 1-yard touchdown run, Isaiah Hankins kick good	17	24
OT	–	7	40	–	Houston	Donovan Smith 1-yard touchdown run, 2-point run by Donovan Smith good	25	24
"TOP" = time of possession. For other American football terms, see Glossary of American football.							25	24

Statistics	Houston	Baylor
First downs	21	22
Plays–yards	59–366	72–413
Rushes–yards	32–130	35–150
Passing yards	236	263
Passing: comp–att–int	21–27–2	29–37–1
Turnovers		
Time of possession	26:39	33:21

Team	Category	Player	Statistics
Houston	Passing	Donovan Smith	21–27, 236 yards, 2 TD, 2 INT
Houston	Rushing	Donovan Smith	20 carries, 66 yards, 1 TD
Houston	Receiving	Samuel Brown	9 receptions, 86 yards, 1 TD
Baylor	Passing	Blake Shapen	29–37, 263 yards, 2 TD, 1 INT
Baylor	Rushing	Dominic Richardson	11 carries, 51 yards
Baylor	Receiving	Drake Dabney	4 receptions, 76 yards, 1 TD

=== Cincinnati ===
Game Ten – Cincinnati Bearcats at Houston Cougars

Quarter	1	2	3	4	Total
Bearcats	7	7	3	7	24
Cougars	0	7	0	7	14

at TDECU Stadium • Houston, Texas

- Date: Saturday, November 11, 2023
- Game time: 7:00 p.m. EDT
- Game weather: Cloudy • Temperature: • Wind:
- Game attendance: 34,312
- Referee: David Alvarez
- TV: FS1

Game information

First quarter

- (8:43) CIN – Ryan Montgomery 7-yard pass from Emory Jones (Carter Brown kick) (Drive: 11 plays, 75 yards, 6:17; Cincinnati 7–0)

Second quarter

- (14:04) HOU – Joseph Manjack IV 7 yard-pass from Donovan Smith (Jack Martin kick) (Drive: 12 plays, 83 yards, 4:57; Tied 7–7)
- (8:04) CIN – Corey Kiner 1-yard run (Carter Brown kick) (Drive: 6 plays, 93 yards, 2:17; Cincinnati 14–7)

Third quarter

- (8:25) CIN – Carter Brown 31-yard field goal (Drive: 12 plays, 37 yards, 6:28; Cincinnati 17–7)

Fourth quarter

- (8:47) CIN – Corey Kiner 5-yard run (Carter Brown kick) (Drive: 6 plays, 52 yards, 3:14; Cincinnati 24–7)
- (3:22) HOU – Joseph Manjack IV 2-yard pass from Donovan Smith (Jack Martin kick) (Drive: 12 plays, 75 yards, 5:25; Cincinnati 24–14)

Statistics	CIN	HOU
First downs	22	12
Plays–yards	71–368	51–241
Rushes–yards	48–204	23–139
Passing yards	164	102
Passing: comp–att–int	17–23–0	16–28–0
Turnovers		
Time of possession	36:55	23:05

Team	Category	Player	Statistics
Cincinnati	Passing	Emory Jones	13/16, 131 yards, 1 TD
Cincinnati	Rushing	Corey Kiner	23 carries, 129 yards, 2 TD
Cincinnati	Receiving	Braden Smith	5 receptions, 69 yards
Houston	Passing	Donovan Smith	16/28, 102 yards, 2 TD, 3 INT
Houston	Rushing	Donovan Smith	13 carries, 88 yards
Houston	Receiving	Joseph Manjack IV	4 receptions, 22 yards, 2 TD

=== No. 23 Oklahoma State ===
No. 23 Oklahoma State Cowboys (7–3) vs. Houston Cougars (4–6)

Quarter	1	2	3	4	Total
No. 23 Oklahoma State	3	16	14	10	43
Houston	14	9	0	7	30

at TDECU Stadium • Houston, TX

- Date: Saturday, November 18, 2023
- Game time: 3:00 p.m. CST
- Game weather: • Sunny Temperature: 74 °F (23 °C)
- Game attendance: 33,906
- Referee: Stephon Baron
- TV announcers (ESPN2): Dave Flemming (play-by-play), Brock Osweiler (analyst) Kayla Burton (sideline)

Game information

First Quarter

Second Quarter

Third Quarter

Fourth Quarter

Statistics	OKST	HOU
First downs	28	18
Total yards	501	393
Rushing yards	153	130
Passing yards	348	263
Passing: Comp–Att–Int	29–43–1	18–30–2
Time of possession	32:12	27:48

Team	Category	Player	Statistics
Oklahoma State	Passing	Alan Bowman	29/43, 348 yards, 2 TD, 1 INT
Oklahoma State	Rushing	Ollie Gordon II	25 carries, 164 yards, 3 TD
Oklahoma State	Receiving	Brennan Presley	15 receptions, 189 yards
Houston	Passing	Donovan Smith	17/29, 235 yards, 1 TD, 2 INT
Houston	Rushing	Donovan Smith	13 carries, 63 yards, 1 TD
Houston	Receiving	Jonah Wilson	1 reception, 60 yards, 1 TD

=== at UCF ===
Houston Cougars at UCF Knights

Quarter	1	2	3	4	Total
Cougars	10	0	0	3	13
Knights	6	7	14	0	27

at FBC Mortgage Stadium, Orlando, FL

- Date: November 25, 2023
- Game time: 12:00 p.m.
- Game attendance: 43,610
- TV announcers (FS1): Eric Collins, Devin Gardner
- Gamecast

Game information

First Quarter

- Houston: Stephon Johnson 16-yard touchdown pass from Donovan Smith (Jack Martin kick), 10:34
- UCF: John Rhys Plumlee 8-yard touchdown run (kick failed), 5:31
- Houston: Jack Martin 32-yard field goal, 1:56

Second Quarter

- UCF: Xavier Townsend 28-yard touchdown pass from John Rhys Plumlee (Colton Boomer kick), 12:58

Third Quarter

- UCF: R.J. Harvey 21-yard touchdown run (Colton Boomer kick), 14:07
- UCF: R.J. Harvey 2-yard touchdown run (Colton Boomer kick), 9:04

Fourth Quarter

- Houston: Jack Martin 34-yard field goal, 10:08

Win Probability

- UCF 77.9%

Line

- UCF -15.5

Over/Under

- 61.5

Statistics	HOU	UCF
First downs	17	23
Total yards	259	476
Rushing yards	94	223
Passing yards	165	253
Turnovers	1	0
Time of possession	27:04	32:56

Team	Category	Player	Statistics
Houston	Passing	Donovan Smith	12–20, 161 yards, 1 TD, I INT
Houston	Rushing	Stacy Sneed	3 carries, 33 yards
Houston	Receiving	Joseph Manjack IV	4 receptions, 74 yards
UCF	Passing	John Rhys Plumlee	23–27, 253 yards, 1 TD
UCF	Rushing	R. J. Harvey	21 carries, 136 yards, 2 TD
UCF	Receiving	Kobe Hudson	9 receptions, 98 yards
