= 2021 Liberty Bowl =

Postseason college football bowl game

2021 AutoZone Liberty Bowl
- 63rd Liberty Bowl
| Mississippi State Bulldogs | Texas Tech Red Raiders |
| (7–5) | (6–6) |
| SEC | Big 12 |
| 7 | 34 |
| Head coach: Mike Leach | Head coach: Sonny Cumbie (interim) |
| | 1 | 2 | 3 | 4 | Total |
|---|---|---|---|---|---|
| Mississippi State | 0 | 7 | 0 | 0 | 7 |
| Texas Tech | 10 | 3 | 14 | 7 | 34 |
- Date: December 28, 2021
- Season: 2021
- Stadium: Liberty Bowl Memorial Stadium
- Location: Memphis, Tennessee
- MVP: Donovan Smith (QB, Texas Tech)
- Favorite: Mississippi State by 10
- Referee: Riley Johnson (ACC)
- Attendance: 48,615

United States TV coverage
- Network: ESPN; ESPN Radio
- Announcers: ESPN: Dave Neal (play-by-play), Deuce McAllister (analyst), and Andraya Carter (sideline); ESPN Radio: Sean Kelley (play-by-play), Barrett Jones (analyst), and Ian Fitzsimmons (sideline)

The 2021 Liberty Bowl was a college football bowl game played on December 28, 2021, with kickoff at 6:45 p.m. EST (5:45 p.m. local CST) and televised on ESPN. It was the 63rd edition of the Liberty Bowl, and was one of the 2021–22 bowl games concluding the 2021 FBS football season. Sponsored by automotive retailer AutoZone, the game was officially known as the AutoZone Liberty Bowl.

== Teams ==
Consistent with conference tie-ins, the game was played between teams from the Southeastern Conference (SEC) and the Big 12 Conference.

This was the eighth meeting between Mississippi State and Texas Tech, with the most recent prior meeting coming in 1970; the Bulldogs led the all-time series, 4–2–1.

=== Mississippi State Bulldogs ===
Mississippi State, from the SEC, finished the regular season with an overall record of 7–5. This was the Bulldogs' third Liberty Bowl appearance, having appeared in the 2007 and 2013 editions, winning both. In 2007, Mississippi State defeated UCF, 10–3. In the 2013 game, the Bulldogs defeated Rice, 44–7. Mississippi State head coach Mike Leach was the head coach at Texas Tech from 2000 to 2009.

=== Texas Tech Red Raiders ===
Texas Tech, from the Big 12, finished the regular season with an overall record of 6–6. This was the Red Raiders' first Liberty Bowl appearance. The team was led by interim head coach Sonny Cumbie, who was the starting quarterback at Texas Tech during the 2004 season, playing for Leach.

== Game summary ==
2021 AutoZone Liberty Bowl

| Quarter | 1 | 2 | 3 | 4 | Total |
|---|---|---|---|---|---|
| Mississippi State | 0 | 7 | 0 | 0 | 7 |
| Texas Tech | 10 | 3 | 14 | 7 | 34 |

at Liberty Bowl Memorial Stadium • Memphis, Tennessee

- Date: Tuesday, December 28, 2021
- Game time: 6:45 p.m. EST (5:45 p.m. local CST)
- Game weather: Cloudy • Temperature: 69 °F (21 °C) • Wind: S 10 MPH
- Game attendance: 48,615
- Referee: Riley Jefferson
- TV announcers (ESPN): Dave Neal (play-by-play), Deuce McAllister (analyst), and Andraya Carter (sideline)
- Box score

Game information

First quarter

- (12:40) TTU - Tahj Brooks 19-yard rush, Jonathan Garibay kick good. Drive: 7 plays, 75 yards, 2:20. Texas Tech 7–0
- (3:03) TTU - Jonathan Garibay 31-yard field goal. Drive: 14 plays, 79 yards, 6:24. Texas Tech 10–0

Second quarter

- (14:08) MSU – Rara Thomas 17-yard pass from Will Rogers, N. McCord kick good. Drive: 10 plays, 75 yards, 3:55. Texas Tech 10–7
- (0:13) TTU – Jonathan Garibay 26-yard field goal. Drive: 4 plays, 6 yards, 0:18. Texas Tech 13–7

Third quarter

- (9:03) TTU – Donovan Smith 1-yard rush, Jonathan Garibay kick good. Drive: 4 plays, 95 yards, 1:00. Texas Tech 20–7
- (0:02) TTU – J. J. Sparkman 14-yard pass from Donovan Smith, Jonathan Garibay kick good. Drive: 9 plays, 60 yards, 4:04. Texas Tech 27–7

Fourth quarter

- (8:47) TTU – SaRodorick Thompson 1-yard rush, Jonathan Garibay kick good. Drive: 8 plays, 85 yards, 3:42. Texas Tech 34–7

=== Statistics ===
| Statistics | MSU | TTU |
|---|---|---|
| First downs | 21 | 24 |
| Plays–yards | 73–344 | 72–512 |
| Rushes–yards | 20–54 | 44–260 |
| Passing yards | 290 | 252 |
| Passing: comp–att–int | 32–53–1 | 15–28–0 |
| Time of possession | 28:41 | 30:57 |

| Team | Category | Player | Statistics |
|---|---|---|---|
| Mississippi State | Passing | Will Rogers | 32/53, 290 yards, TD, INT |
| Mississippi State | Rushing | Dill Johnson | 9 rushes, 62 yards |
| Mississippi State | Receiving | Austin Williams | 5 receptions, 74 yards |
| Texas Tech | Passing | Donovan Smith | 15/28, 252 yards, TD |
| Texas Tech | Rushing | Tahj Brooks | 16 rushes, 107 yards, TD |
| Texas Tech | Receiving | Myles Price | 3 receptions, 72 yards |

== Externals links ==
- Game statistics at statbroadcast.com
