= Henry Colombi =

American football player (born 1999)

No. 3
- Position: Quarterback

Personal information
- Born: April 4, 1999 (age 27); Hollywood, Florida, U.S.
- Listed height: 6 ft 2 in (1.88 m)
- Listed weight: 205 lb (93 kg)

Career information
- High school: Chaminade-Madonna Prep (FL)
- College: Utah State (2017–2019); Texas Tech (2020–2021); Marshall (2022)
- NFL draft: 2023: undrafted

Henry Colombi (born April 4, 1999) is an American football quarterback. He previously played for the Utah State Aggies, Texas Tech Red Raiders, and Marshall Thundering Herd.

== College career ==
=== Utah State ===
Colombi redshirted his first year at Utah State and did not play.

The first collegiate game Colombi appeared in was in week 2 of the 2018 season against New Mexico State in relief of starter Jordan Love in the 60–13 victory; he would finish the game 3-of-4 for 13 yards. The following game, against Tennessee Tech, Colombi played the entire second half of the game as the Aggies were up 45–6 at halftime. Colombi would finish 9-of-9 for 55 yards along with 22 rushing yards on 3 attempts in the 73–12 victory. Colombi would not appear in a game again until three games later against UNLV. In the fourth quarter, Colombi would score his first touchdown in college on a 37-yard run in the 59–28 victory. Colombi would appear in two more games in relief of Love, finishing the 2018 season 33-of-40 for 239 yards passing along with 108 rushing yards and a touchdown as Utah State finished the season 11–2.

=== Texas Tech ===
Heading into the 2020 season, Colombi was expected to be named Utah State's starting quarterback after previous starter Jordan Love was drafted in the 2020 NFL draft by the Green Bay Packers. In July 2020, Colombi announced that he would be transferring to Texas Tech, joining former Utah State head coach Matt Wells and offensive coordinator David Yost, just days after Utah quarterback Jason Shelley announced he would be transferring to Utah State. The following month, Colombi was granted an eligibility waiver by the NCAA that allowed him to play for the 2020 season.

Colombi made two appearances for Texas Tech in relief of starter Alan Bowman; for three quarters on October 3 against Kansas State and for one quarter against Iowa State a week later. Between the two relief appearances, Colombi finished 40-of-54 passes for 359 yards and 3 touchdowns along with 51 rushing yards. Colombi made his first collegiate start on October 24 when Texas Tech played West Virginia after Bowman struggled during the season. In his first start, Colombi threw for 169 yards and a touchdown and rushed for another touchdown in the 34–27 victory.

Prior to the 2021 season, Colombi was in a QB competition against Oregon transfer Tyler Shough and freshmen Maverick McIvor, Donovan Smith, and Behren Morton. On August 24, Shough was announced as the team's starting QB for the Red Raiders' week one game against Houston, with Colombi serving as his backup. During the team's week 4 game against Texas, Shough broke his collarbone and was replaced by Colombi, finishing the game 17-of-23 for 324 yards with three touchdowns and an interception in the 35–70 loss. Colombi was expected be the team's starter until Shough could return. On October 30, against Oklahoma, Colombi was shaken up after getting tackled in the 2nd quarter, with redshirt quarterback Donovan Smith replacing him for the rest of the game. Colombi was not active for the team's game against Iowa State due to illness. On the Monday before the Liberty Bowl, interim head coach Sonny Cumbie announced that Colombi had left the team for "personal reasons."

=== Marshall ===
On January 12, 2022, Colombi entered the NCAA's transfer portal. On January 16, it was announced that Colombi would be transferring to Marshall. On August 26, Colombi was named the starting quarterback prior to week 1. Colombi exited the Thundering Herd's week five game against Gardner–Webb in the second quarter due to a possible knee injury.

=== Statistics ===
Season	Team	GP	Passing								Rushing			
Season	Team	GP	Cmp	Att	Pct	Yds	Y/A	TD	Int	Rtg	Att	Yds	Avg	TD
2017	Utah State	0	(redshirt) Redshirted											
2018	Utah State	5	33	40	82.5	239	6.0	0	0	132.7	13	108	8.3	1
2019	Utah State	6	20	29	69.0	221	7.6	2	1	148.8	14	31	2.2	1
2020	Texas Tech	6	109	166	65.7	1,065	6.4	8	4	130.6	51	103	2.0	1
2021	Texas Tech	7	95	148	64.2	1,291	8.7	5	5	141.9	36	66	1.8	2
2022	Marshall	7	94	128	73.4	938	7.3	6	4	144.2	43	−18	−0.4	0
Career		31	352	512	68.8	3,754	7.3	21	14	138.4	157	290	1.8	5

== Professional career ==
Colombi went undrafted out of college. He received an invite to the Miami Dolphins' rookie minicamp in 2023.
