= 2021 Texas Tech Red Raiders football team =

American college football season

2021 Texas Tech Red Raiders football

Liberty Bowl champion

Liberty Bowl, W 34–7 vs. Mississippi State
- Conference: Big 12 Conference
- Record: 7–6 (3–6 Big 12)
- Head coach: Matt Wells (3rd season; first 8 games); Sonny Cumbie (interim; remainder of season)
- Offensive coordinator: Sonny Cumbie (2nd season)
- Offensive scheme: Spread
- Defensive coordinator: Keith Patterson (3rd season)
- Co-defensive coordinator: Derek Jones (2nd season)
- Base defense: 3–3–5
- Captain: 13: Colin Schooler; Riko Jeffers; Josh Burger; DaMarcus Fields; Marquis Waters; McLane Mannix; Dawson Deaton; Tony Bradford; Tyler Shough; Jaylon Hutchings; Erik Ezukanma; SaRodorick Thompson; Caleb Rogers
- Home stadium: Jones AT&T Stadium

2021 Big 12 Conference football standings
	Conf.			Overall
Team	W		L	W		L
No. 7 Oklahoma State y	8	–	1	12	–	2
No. 5 Baylor y$	7	–	2	12	–	2
No. 10 Oklahoma	7	–	2	11	–	2
Iowa State	5	–	4	7	–	6
Kansas State	4	–	5	8	–	5
West Virginia	4	–	5	6	–	7
Texas	3	–	6	5	–	7
TCU	3	–	6	5	–	7
Texas Tech	3	–	6	7	–	6
Kansas	1	–	8	2	–	10
Championship: Baylor 21, Oklahoma State 16
$ – Conference champion; y – Championship game participant; Rankings from AP Poll

The 2021 Texas Tech Red Raiders football team represented Texas Tech University during the 2021 NCAA Division I FBS football season. The Red Raiders play their home games at the Jones AT&T Stadium in Lubbock, Texas, and compete in the Big 12 Conference. With a 41–38 win over Iowa State on November 13, Texas Tech became bowl eligible for the first time since the 2017 season. The team finished the season with an overall record of 7–6 for the Red Raiders' first winning season since 2015.

The team was led by third-year head coach Matt Wells for the first eight games. Wells was fired on October 25, with offensive coordinator Sonny Cumbie being named interim head coach. Baylor associate head coach/outside linebackers coach Joey McGuire was named as Texas Tech's 17th head coach on November 8; Cumbie continued to serve as interim head coach for the remainder of the season. On November 24, McGuire announced that he would be retaining Cumbie as offensive coordinator and quarterbacks coach. However, on November 30, it was announced that Cumbie would become the head coach at Louisiana Tech; Cumbie would coach Texas Tech for its bowl game.

Following the regular season, kicker Jonathan Garibay was elected to the All-Big 12 Football First Team, while wide receiver Erik Ezukanma, offensive lineman Dawson Deaton, linebacker Colin Schooler, defensive back DaMarcus Fields, and punter Austin McNamara were selected to the second team.

== Preseason ==
=== Award watch lists ===
Listed in the order that they were released

Award	Player	Position	Year
Chuck Bednarik Award	Colin Schooler	LB	SR
Maxwell Award	Erik Ezukanma	WR	JR
Doak Walker Award	SaRodorick Thompson	RB	JR
Fred Biletnikoff Award	Erik Ezukanma	WR	JR
Fred Biletnikoff Award	Kaylon Geiger	WR	SR
Rimington Trophy	Dawson Deaton	OL	SR
Johnny Unitas Golden Arm Award	Tyler Shough	QB	JR
Ray Guy Award	Austin McNamara	P	JR
Lou Groza Award	Jonathan Garibay	PK	SR

=== Big 12 media days ===
The Big 12 Media Days were held on July 14–15, 2021 at AT&T Stadium in Arlington, Texas. Texas Tech was represented by head coach Matt Wells, offensive lineman Dawson Deaton, and linebacker Riko Jeffers.

=== Big 12 media poll ===
Big 12 media poll
Predicted finish	Team	Votes (1st place)
1	Oklahoma	386 (35)
2	Iowa State	351 (4)
3	Texas	273
4	Oklahoma State	266
5	TCU	255
6	West Virginia	185
7	Kansas State	163
8	Baylor	124
9	Texas Tech	103
10	Kansas	39

=== Preseason All-Big 12 team ===
The 2021 Preseason All-Big 12 Team was announced on July 7, with three Texas Tech players being selected.

Team	Player	Position	Year
1st	Erik Ezukanma	WR	JR
2nd	Dawson Deaton	OL	SR
1st	Austin McNamara	P	SR

== Schedule ==
Date	Time	Opponent	Site	TV	Result	Attendance
September 4	6:00 p.m.	vs. Houston*	NRG Stadium; Houston, TX (Texas Kickoff; rivalry)	ESPN	W 38–21	43,478
September 11	6:00 p.m.	Stephen F. Austin*	Jones AT&T Stadium; Lubbock, TX	ESPN+	W 28–22	55,271
September 18	6:00 p.m.	FIU*	Jones AT&T Stadium; Lubbock, TX	ESPN+	W 54–21	50,118
September 25	11:00 a.m.	at Texas	Darrell K Royal–Texas Memorial Stadium; Austin, TX (rivalry)	ABC	L 35–70	98,349
October 2	2:30 p.m.	at West Virginia	Milan Puskar Stadium; Morgantown, WV	ESPN2	W 23–20	54,090
October 9	6:00 p.m.	TCU^{†}	Jones AT&T Stadium; Lubbock, TX (rivalry)	ESPN	L 31–52	55,821
October 16	3:00 p.m.	at Kansas	David Booth Kansas Memorial Stadium; Lawrence, KS	ESPN+	W 41–14	25,106
October 23	11:00 a.m.	Kansas State	Jones AT&T Stadium; Lubbock, TX	FS1	L 24–25	52,874
October 30	2:30 p.m.	at No. 4 Oklahoma	Gaylord Family Oklahoma Memorial Stadium; Norman, OK	ABC	L 21–52	82,732
November 13	2:30 p.m.	Iowa State	Jones AT&T Stadium; Lubbock, TX	ESPN2	W 41–38	47,158
November 20	7:00 p.m.	No. 9 Oklahoma State	Jones AT&T Stadium; Lubbock, TX	Fox	L 0–23	53,169
November 27	11:00 a.m.	at No. 8 Baylor	McLane Stadium; Waco, TX (rivalry)	FS1	L 24–27	43,901
December 28	5:45 p.m.	vs. Mississippi State*	Liberty Bowl Memorial Stadium; Memphis, TN (Liberty Bowl)	ESPN	W 34–7	48,615
*Non-conference game; ^{†}Homecoming; Rankings from AP Poll (and CFP Rankings, after November 2) - Released prior to game; All times are in Central time

Schedule source:

== Coaching staff ==
Name	Position	Year at Texas Tech	Alma mater
Matt Wells	Head coach	3rd	Utah State
Sonny Cumbie	Offensive coordinator/quarterbacks	1st	Texas Tech
Keith Patterson	Defensive coordinator	3rd	East Central
Derek Jones	Co-defensive coordinator/secondary	2nd	Mississippi
Mark Tommerdahl	Special teams coordinator/Assistant Offensive Line	3rd	Concordia
Kevin Cosgrove	Linebackers	2nd	Wisconsin–Oshkosh
Steve Farmer	Offensive line	3rd	Illinois State
Joel Filani	Outside Receivers	3rd	Texas Tech
Paul Randolph	Defensive line	3rd	Tennessee Martin
DeAndre Smith	Running backs	3rd	Southwest Missouri State
Luke Wells	Tight Ends/Inside Receivers	3rd	Oklahoma
Dave Scholz	Strength and conditioning	3rd	Wisconsin–Eau Claire

== Roster ==
2021 Texas Tech Red Raiders Football Roster
Quarterbacks: 2 Behren Morton – freshman (6'3, 185); 3 Henry Colombi – (redshirt) senior (6'2, 205); 7 Donovan Smith – (redshirt) freshman (6'5, 215); 8 Maverick McIvor – (redshirt) sophomore (6'3, 215); 12 Tyler Shough – (redshirt) junior (6'5, 220); 17 Parker McNeil – (redshirt) junior (6'5, 235); Running backs: 4 SaRodorick Thompson – (redshirt) junior (6'0, 210); 5 Chadarius Townsend – (redshirt) senior (6'0, 200); 14 Xavier White – (redshirt) junior (5'11, 190); 23 Kyron Cumby – sophomore (5'8, 180); 27 Cam'Ron Valdez – freshman (5'9, 195); 28 Tahj Brooks – sophomore (5'10, 215); 33 Ronnie Hart – sophomore (6'0, 205); Wide receivers: 10 Kaylon Geiger – (redshirt) senior (5'10, 180); 11 McLane Mannix – (redshirt) senior (5'10, 190); 13 Erik Ezukanma – (redshirt) junior (6'3, 220); 18 Myles Price – sophomore (5'10, 175); 19 Loic Fouonji – sophomore (6'4, 205); 22 Sterling Galban – (redshirt) junior (5'11, 175); 24 Cole Kirkpatrick – freshman (6'0, 185); 29 Ben Gair – freshman (6'1, 195); 32 Jake Bishop – sophomore (5'7, 175); 45 Austin Brougham – (redshirt) junior (6'2, 195); 47 Jalen McCoslin – freshman (6'0, 180); 82 Nehemiah Martinez – freshman (5'9, 185); 83 Cameron Cantrell – (redshirt) sophomore (6'1, 195); 84 J. J. Sparkman – (redshirt) freshman (6'4, 215); 85 Trey Cleveland – (redshirt) sophomore (6'4, 190); 86 Dalton Rigdon – (redshirt) senior (5'11, 170); 89 Jerand Bradley – freshman (6'5, 210); Tight ends: 15 Travis Koontz – (redshirt) senior (6'5, 255); 26 Jason Lloyd – (redshirt) sophomore (6'4, 240); 41 Jayden York – (redshirt) freshman (6'3, 215); 43 Henry Teeter – (redshirt) junior (6'4, 230); 80 Mason Tharp – freshman (6'8, 230); 88 Jed Castles – freshman (6'7, 225); Long snappers: 30 Jackson Knotts – freshman (5'11, 185); 61 Jacob Mauch – sophomore (6'3, 220); 62 Hayden Welte – (redshirt) sophomore (6'5, 220)	Offensive linemen: 50 Josh Burger – (redshirt) senior (6'4, 295); 51 T. J. Storment – (redshirt) senior (6'7, 325); 53 Trevor Roberson – (redshirt) sophomore (6'11, 345); 57 Blake Spence – freshman (6'1, 255); 58 Jack Tucker – freshman (6'7, 285); 63 Aaron Castro – (redshirt) sophomore (6'3, 295); 64 Clayton Franks – (redshirt) junior (6'4, 290); 65 Tay Yanta – (redshirt) freshman (6'4, 350); 66 Matt Keeler – (redshirt) freshman (6'6, 295); 67 Blake Burris – freshman (6'3, 300); 68 Casey Verhulst – (redshirt) senior (6'6, 305); 69 Caleb Rodkey – freshman (6'4, 300); 70 Weston Wright – (redshirt) junior (6'6, 315); 71 Brett Canis – freshman (6'6, 315); 72 Landon Peterson – (redshirt) sophomore (6'6, 300); 73 Dawson Deaton – (redshirt) senior (6'6, 310); 74 Larry Moore – (redshirt) freshman (6'6, 290); 75 Jacoby Jackson – freshman (6'6, 330); 76 Caleb Rogers – sophomore (6'5, 290); 77 Ethan Carde – (redshirt) junior (6'8, 315); 79 Jacob Votaw – freshman (6'5, 265); Defensive linemen: 19 Tyree Wilson – junior (6'6, 280); 43 Jake Justice – sophomore (6'6, 210); 49 Charles Esters III – freshman (6'3, 245); 51 Robert Wooten – sophomore (6'3, 240); 59 Isaac Smith – freshman (6'6, 240); 78 Alexander Poole – senior (6'1, 305); 90 Devin Drew – (redshirt) senior (6'2, 280); 91 Nelson Mbanasor – senior (6'3, 275); 92 L. B. Moore – (redshirt) freshman (6'3, 240); 93 Troy Te'o – (redshirt) senior (6'2, 280); 94 Tre'Jon Lewis – (redshirt) sophomore (6'4, 250); 95 Jaylon Hutchings – (redshirt) junior (6'0, 300); 96 Philip Blidi – sophomore (6'4, 275); 97 Tony Bradford Jr. – junior (6'1, 290); 98 E'Maurion Banks – freshman (6'5, 295); 99 Gilbert Ibeneme – (redshirt) sophomore (6'3, 285); Placekickers: 36 Trey Wolff – (redshirt) junior (6'4, 205); 46 Jonathan Garibay – (redshirt) senior (6'0, 215); 60 Landon Reeves – (redshirt) junior (5'9, 155)	Linebackers: 1 Krishon Merriweather – (redshirt) senior (6'0, 240); 2 Brandon Bouyer-Randle – (redshirt) senior (6'2, 235); 6 Riko Jeffers – (redshirt) senior (6'2, 235); 16 Jesiah Pierre – (redshirt) sophomore (6'2, 245); 17 Colin Schooler – (redshirt) senior (6'1, 230); 20 Kosi Eldridge – (redshirt) senior (6'1, 225); 24 Jacob Morgenstern – (redshirt) senior (6'4, 230); 32 Tyrique Matthews – junior (5'11, 220); 33 Matthew Young – (redshirt) senior (6'1, 240); 34 Bryce Robinson – (redshirt) sophomore (6'0, 230); 35 Patrick Curley – (redshirt) junior (6'2, 235); 39 Charles Robinson – freshman (6'0, 230); 42 Gage Elder – freshman (5'11, 215); 47 Ethan Frasier – (redshirt) sophomore (6'1, 230); 48 Derrick Lewis II – (redshirt) freshman (6'1 205); 50 Trent Low – (redshirt) freshman (6'1, 205); 54 Bryce Ramirez – (redshirt) sophomore (6'0, 220); 56 Jackson Baggett – (redshirt) sophomore (6'3, 220); Defensive backs: 0 Seth Collins – (redshirt) senior (6'3, 200); 3 Kobee Minor – (redshirt) freshman (6'0, 190); 7 Adrian Frye – (redshirt) senior (6'0, 190); 8 Malik Dunlap – (redshirt) junior (6'3, 215); 9 Marquis Waters – (redshirt) senior (6'1, 200); 10 Cam White – (redshirt) junior (6'1, 200); 11 Eric Monroe – (redshirt) senior (5'11, 205); 12 Rayshad Williams – (redshirt) junior (6'2, 190); 15 Cole Boyd – (redshirt) sophomore (6'3, 200); 21 Cameron Watts – (redshirt) junior (5'10, 195); 22 Reggie Pearson Jr. – (redshirt) junior (5'11, 200); 23 DaMarcus Fields – (redshirt) senior (6'0, 200); 25 Dadrion Taylor-Demerson – junior (5'11, 190); 28 Louis Ortiz – freshman (5'11, 195); 29 Nate Floyd – (redshirt) freshman (6'0, 175); 31 Joseph Plunk – (redshirt) freshman (5'10, 165); 37 Imari Jones – freshman (6'1, 165); 38 Jett Whitfield – (redshirt) sophomore (5'11, 200); 40 Luis Jaramillo – sophomore (6'0, 185); 41 Joe Shaw – freshman (5'10, 165); 45 Chief Collins – freshman (5'11, 190); 46 Jonathan Davis – (redshirt) freshman (6'1, 170); Punters: 31 Austin McNamara – junior (6'4, 185); 48 Grant Nickel – freshman (6'0, 160)

== Game summaries ==
=== Vs. Houston (Texas Kickoff) ===
Texas Tech Red Raiders vs. Houston Cougars (Texas Kickoff) – Game summary

Quarter	1	2	3	4	Total
Red Raiders	0	7	17	14	38
Cougars	14	7	0	0	21

at NRG Stadium, Houston, Texas

- Date: September 4
- Game time: 6:00 p.m.
- Game weather: 72 °F (22 °C) • None (retractable roof closed)
- Game attendance: 43,478
- Referee: David Alvarez
- TV announcers (ESPN): Mark Jones (play-by-play), Robert Griffin III (analyst) and Quint Kessenich (sideline)
- Box score, Recap

Game information

First quarter

- HOU – Clayton Tune 1-yard run (Dalton Witherspoon kick), 6:37. Cougars 7–0. Drive: 15 plays, 74 yards, 8:23.
- HOU – Tank Dell 23-yard pass from Clayton Tune (Dalton Witherspoon kick), 2:13. Cougars 14–0. Drive: 8 plays, 54 yards, 4:24.

Second quarter

- TTU – Tahj Brooks 41-yard run (Jonathan Garibay kick), 11:47. Cougars 14–7. Drive: 1 play, 41 yards, 0:10.
- HOU – Seth Green 9-yard pass from Clayton Tune (Dalton Witherspoon kick), 0:23. Cougars 21–7. Drive: 13 plays, 75 yards, 4:52.

Third quarter

- TTU – Tyler Shough 8-yard run (Jonathan Garibay kick), 8:08. Cougars 21–14. Drive: 6 plays, 60 yards, 3:06.
- TTU – Riko Jeffers 12-yard interception return (Jonathan Garibay kick), 7:20. Tied 21–21.
- TTU – Jonathan Garibay 34-yard field goal, 0:36. Red Raiders 24–21. Drive: 4 plays, 6 yards, 1:15.

Fourth quarter

- TTU – Xavier White 3-yard pass from Tyler Shough (Jonathan Garibay kick), 2:05. Red Raiders 31–21. Drive: 8 plays, 71 yards, 2:52.
- TTU – Tahj Brooks 44-yard run (Jonathan Garibay kick), 1:00. Red Raiders 38–21. Drive: 2 plays, 48 yards, 0:15.

Top passers

- TTU – Tyler Shough – 17/24, 231 yards, TD
- HOU – Clayton Tune – 27/38, 174 yards, 2 TD, 4 INT

Top rushers

- TTU – Tahj Brooks – 15 rushes, 134 yards, 2 TD
- HOU – Mulbah Car – 13 rushes, 37 yards

Top receivers

- TTU – Erik Ezukanma – 7 receptions, 179 yards
- HOU – Tank Dell – 7 receptions, 80 yards, TD

This was Texas Tech's second appearance in the Texas Kickoff game, with the team's first appearance being a 27–47 loss to Ole Miss in 2018.

Houston received the opening kickoff, starting the drive at its own 25-yard line. The Cougars would drive down the field, capping the drive off with a 1-yard run from Clayton Tune. On the ensuing kickoff, Houston attempted an onside kick and recovered it. The Cougars would score another touchdown, this time with a 23-yard pass from Tune to Tank Dell to go up 14–0 following Dalton Witherspoon's kick. The Cougars would kick it off this time, giving Texas Tech's offense its first drive of the game. The Red Raiders made it down to the Houston 2-yard line, but running back Xavier White fumbled the ball and was recovered by Donavan Mutin for Houston. Houston would go three-and-out on its next drive, punting the ball away. On the next play, running back Tahj Brooks ripped off a 41-yard run for a touchdown. On the Cougars' following offensive play, Tune was intercepted by Reggie Pearson Jr.

After being down 7–21 at halftime, Texas Tech scored 31 unanswered points in the 2nd half for a 38–21 victory. The Red Raiders' defense picked off Houston quarterback Clayton Tune four times, including a pick six touchdown.

=== Stephen F. Austin ===
Stephen F. Austin Lumberjacks at Texas Tech Red Raiders – Game summary

Quarter	1	2	3	4	Total
Lumberjacks	7	6	0	9	22
Red Raiders	7	0	14	7	28

at Jones AT&T Stadium, Lubbock, Texas

- Date: September 11
- Game time: 6:00 p.m.
- Game weather: Temperature: 90 °F (32 °C) • Weather: Sunny
- Game attendance: 55,271
- Referee: Tutu Salaam
- TV announcers (ESPN+): Mark Neely (play-by-play) and Brandon Jacobs (analyst)
- Box score, Recap

Game information

First quarter

- TTU – Erik Ezukanma 75-yard pass from Tyler Shough (Jonathan Garibay kick), 13:51. Red Raiders 7–0. Drive: 3 plays, 77 yards, 1:09.
- SFA – Willie Roberts 18-yard interception return (Chris Campos kick), 1:57. Tied 7–7.

Second quarter

- SFA – Chris Campos 23-yard field goal, 10:15. Lumberjacks 10–7. Drive: 7 plays, 17 yards, 2:47.
- SFA – Chris Campos 35-yard field goal, 1:23. Lumberjacks 13–7. Drive: 13 plays, 65 yards, 6:22.

Third quarter

- TTU – Tahj Brooks 67-yard run (Jonathan Garibay kick), 12:47. Red Raiders 14–13. Drive: 2 plays, 80 yards, 1:03.
- TTU – Tahj Brooks 1-yard run (Jonathan Garibay kick), 5:24. Red Raiders 21–13. Drive: 8 plays, 97 yards, 4:22.

Fourth quarter

- SFA – Ja'Bray Young 4-yard pass from Trae Self (pass failed), 13:57. Red Raiders 21–19. Drive: 3 plays, 26 yards, 1:03.
- TTU – Xavier White 4-yard run (Jonathan Garibay kick), 12:30. Red Raiders 28–19. Drive: 4 plays, 65 yards, 1:27.
- SFA – Chris Campos 36-yard field goal, 7:13. Red Raiders 28–22. Drive: 10 plays, 58 yards, 5:17.

Top passers

- SFA – Trae Self – 38/58, 343 yards, TD
- TTU – Tyler Shough – 11/21, 163 yards, TD, 2 INT

Top rushers

- SFA – Miles Reed – 9 rushes, 20 yards
- TTU – Tahj Brooks – 11 rushes, 115 yards, 2 TD

Top receivers

- SFA – Xavier Gipson – 13 receptions, 158 yards
- TTU – Erik Ezukanma – 6 receptions, 144 yards, TD

The Red Raiders took an early 7–0 lead, but the Lumberjacks scored 13 unanswered points for a 13–7 halftime lead. Texas Tech running back Tahj Brooks scored two touchdowns in the 3rd to go up 21–13. Stephen F. Austin quickly responded, with Trae Self throwing a 4-yard touchdown pass to Ja'Bray Young in the opening seconds of the 4th quarter, but the two-point conversion to tie the game failed. The Red Raiders would respond on their next drive with a 4-yard touchdown run from Xavier White to extend their lead to 28–19. The Lumberjacks would respond with a 36-yard field goal from kicker Chris Campos to trail 22–28. Texas Tech failed to do anything on its next possession, going three-and-out and punted the ball away. Stephen F. Austin made it to the Texas Tech 7-yard line with just over a minute left in the game, but failed to convert on 4th down. The Red Raiders kneeled down twice to end the game, winning 28–22.

Texas Tech committed four turnovers in the game while Stephen F. Austin had zero. Tyler Shough threw two interceptions, including a pick six, and also lost a fumble; wide receiver McClane Mannix also lost a fumble. The Lumberjacks had possession of the ball for 40:07, going 5-of-21 on 3rd downs, 5-of-8 on 4th downs, and had 375 yards of total offense. The Red Raiders only held on to the ball for 19:53, going 5-of-10 on 3rd downs, 0-of-1 on 4th downs, and had 364 yards of total offense.

=== FIU ===
FIU Panthers at Texas Tech Red Raiders – Game summary

Quarter	1	2	3	4	Total
Panthers	7	7	7	0	21
Red Raiders	7	28	9	10	54

at Jones AT&T Stadium, Lubbock, Texas

- Date: September 18
- Game time: 6:00 p.m.
- Game weather: Temperature: 88 °F (31 °C) • Weather: Sunny
- Game attendance: 50,118
- Referee: Tim Hedgepeth
- TV announcers (ESPN+): Mark Neely (play-by-play) and Brandon Jacobs (analyst)
- Box score, Recap

Game information

First quarter

- FIU – D'Vonte Price 3-yard run (Chase Gabriel kick), 6:27. Panthers 7–0. Drive: 9 plays, 88 yards, 4:58.
- TTU – Marquise Waters 72-yard interception return (Jonathan Garibay kick), 3:18. Tied 7–7.

Second quarter

- TTU – Travis Koontz 4-yard pass from Tyler Shough (Jonathan Garibay kick), 12:15. Red Raiders 14–7. Drive: 7 plays, 80 yards, 2:29.
- FIU – E.J. Wilson Jr. 69-yard pass from Max Bortenschlager (Chase Gabriel kick), 10:51. Tied 14–14. Drive: 3 plays, 75 yards, 1:23.
- TTU – SaRodrick Thompson 1-yard run (Jonathan Garibay kick), 9:38. Red Raiders 21–14. Drive: 3 plays, 75 yards, 1:13.
- TTU – Trey Cleveland 28-yard pass from Tyler Shough (Jonathan Garibay kick), 4:48. Red Raiders 28–14. Drive: 6 plays, 68 yards, 2:42.
- TTU – Travis Koontz 1-yard pass from Tyler Shough (Jonathan Garibay kick), 0:05. Red Raiders 35–14. Drive: 12 plays, 61 yards, 2:52.

Third quarter

- TTU – Jonathan Garibay 21-yard field goal, 9:08. Red Raiders 38–14. Drive: 11 plays, 72 yards, 5:52.
- FIU – Nate Jefferson 2-yard pass from Max Bortenschlager (Chase Gabriel kick), 3:16. Red Raiders 38–21. Drive: 9 plays, 53 yards, 2:21.
- TTU – Mason Tharp 25-yard pass from Tyler Shough (kick failed), 0:55. Red Raiders 44–21. Drive: 6 plays, 75 yards, 2:21.

Fourth quarter

- TTU – Jonathan Garibay 28-yard field goal, 10:56. Red Raiders 47–21. Drive: 10 plays, 65 yards, 4:27.
- TTU – Henry Colombi 19-yard run (Jonathan Garibay kick), 5:47. Red Raiders 54–21. Drive: 7 plays, 55 yards, 3:41.

Top passers

- FIU – Max Bortenschlager – 12/27, 190 yards, 2 TD, INT
- TTU – Tyler Shough – 26/35, 399 yards, 4 TD

Top rushers

- FIU – D'Vonte Price – 15 rushes, 51 yards, TD
- TTU – Tahj Brooks – 9 rushes, 47 yards

Top receivers

- FIU – Tyrese Chambers – 2 receptions, 71 yards
- TTU – Kaylon Geiger – 6 receptions, 121 yards

The two teams punted on their first possessions before FIU scored a touchdown on its second possession with a 3-yard run from D'vonte Price. The Panthers' following drive ended with a punt, but a miscue from the Red Raiders' special teams gave the ball back to FIU at the Texas Tech 38-yard line. On the next play, Marquise Waters intercepted a Max Bortenschlager pass and returned it 72 yards for a pick six. FIU made it to the Texas Tech 14-yard line on its next drive, helped by two defensive penalties on 3rd down, but had to settle for a field goal; however, Chase Gabriel's 32-yard attempt was no good, going wide right. Texas Tech scored its first offensive touchdown on the following drive with a 4-yard pass from Tyler Shough to tight end Travis Koontz. The Panthers would quickly respond, with Bortenschlager throwing a 69-yard touchdown pass to running back E.J. Wilson Jr. on 3rd down. The Red Raiders would go on to score 21 unanswered points to lead 35–14 at halftime.

Shough exited the game early in the 4th quarter, finishing with 399 yards (a career high) and 4 touchdowns (tying a career high) with no interceptions. He was replaced for one drive by Henry Colombi, who finished the drive with a 19-yard touchdown run. Donovan Smith would finish the game at quarterback. With the victory, Texas Tech started a season 3–0 for the first time since 2017.

=== At Texas ===
Texas Tech Red Raiders at Texas Longhorns – Game summary

Quarter	1	2	3	4	Total
Red Raiders	0	14	14	7	35
Longhorns	14	28	21	7	70

at Darrell K Royal–Texas Memorial Stadium, Austin, Texas

- Date: September 25
- Game time: 11:00 a.m.
- Game weather: Temperature: 86 °F (30 °C) • Weather: Sunny • Wind: N 5 MPH
- Game attendance: 98,349
- Referee: Kevin Hassell
- TV announcers (ABC): Dave Pasch (play-by-play), Dusty Dvoracek (analyst) and Tom Luginbill (sideline)
- Box score, Recap

Game information

First quarter

- TEX – Bijan Robinson 38-yard pass from Casey Thompson (Cameron Dicker kick), 11:07. Longhorns 7–0. Drive: 10 plays, 75 yards, 3:53.
- TEX – Roschon Johnson 3-yard run (Cameron Dicker kick), 5:32. Longhorns 14–0. Drive: 9 plays, 80 yards, 3:05.

Second quarter

- TTU – Tyler Shough 6-yard run (Jonathan Garibay kick), 14:00. Longhorns 14–7. Drive: 14 plays, 75 yards, 6:32.
- TEX – Casey Thompson 1-yard run (Cameron Dicker kick), 10:16. Longhorns 21–7. Drive: 12 plays, 75 yards, 3:44.
- TEX – Josh Thompson 27-yard interception return (Cameron Dicker kick), 9:49. Longhorns 28–7.
- TEX – Xavier Worthy 23-yard pass from Casey Thompson (Cameron Dicker kick), 5:05. Longhorns 35–7. Drive: 6 plays, 40 yards, 2:30.
- TTU – Myles Price 40-yard pass from Henry Colombi (Jonathan Garibay kick), 3:32. Longhorns 35–14. Drive: 4 plays, 75 yards, 1:33.
- TEX – Roschon Johnson 7-yard run (Cameron Dicker kick), 0:09. Longhorns 42–14. Drive: 9 plays, 84 yards, 3:23.

Third quarter

- TEX – Jordan Whittington 5-yard pass from Casey Thompson (Cameron Dicker kick), 9:01. Longhorns 49–14. Drive: 2 plays, 7 yards, 0:37.
- TTU – Loic Fouonji 69-yard pass from Henry Colombi (Jonathan Garibay kick), 7:24. Longhorns 49–21. Drive: 3 plays, 75 yards, 1:37.
- TEX – Xavier Worthy 3-yard pass from Casey Thompson (Cameron Dicker kick), 5:14. Longhorns 56–21. Drive: 6 plays, 87 yards, 2:10.
- TTU – Kaylon Geiger 75-yard pass from Henry Colombi (Jonathan Garibay kick), 5:02. Longhorns 56–28. Drive: 1 play, 75 yards, 0:12.
- TEX – Xavier Worthy 62-yard pass from Casey Thompson (Cameron Dicker kick), 4:09. Longhorns 63–28. Drive: 3 plays, 75 yards, 0:53.

Fourth quarter

- TEX – Keilan Robinson 1-yard run (Cameron Dicker kick), 13:23. Longhorns 70–28. Drive: 6 plays, 60 yards, 2:20.
- TTU – Donovan Smith 1-yard run (Jonathan Garibay kick), 6:40. Longhorns 70–35. Drive: 15 plays, 75 yards, 6:43.

Top passers

- TTU – Henry Colombi – 17/23, 324 yards, 3 TD, INT
- TEX – Casey Thompson – 18/23, 303 yards, 5 TD, INT

Top rushers

- TTU – SaRodorick Thompson – 17 rushes, 54 yards
- TEX – Bijan Robinson – 18 rushes, 137 yards

Top receivers

- TTU – Kaylon Geiger – 5 receptions, 100 yards, TD
- TEX – Xavier Worthy – 5 receptions, 100 yards, 3 TD

Texas Tech's defense struggled in the first half, letting the Texas offense score on five straight drives and letting the Longhorns convert on 4th down twice. In the 2nd quarter, Tyler Shough threw a pick six and was injured on the play; he finished 9-of-11 for 68 yards with a rushing touchdown and an interception. Henry Colombi would come in for the injured Shough, throwing a 40-yard touchdown pass to Myles Price on his second drive.

=== At West Virginia ===
Texas Tech Red Raiders at West Virginia Mountaineers – Game summary

Quarter	1	2	3	4	Total
Red Raiders	14	3	0	6	23
Mountaineers	0	0	17	3	20

at Milan Puskar Stadium, Morgantown, West Virginia

- Date: October 2
- Game time: 2:30 p.m.
- Game weather: Temperature: 75 °F (24 °C) • Weather: Sunny • Wind: SW 6 MPH
- Game attendance: 54,090
- Referee: Michael Vandervelde
- TV announcers (ESPN2): Anish Shroff (play-by-play), Mike Golic Jr. (analyst) and Lauren Sisler (sideline)
- Box score, Recap

Game information

First quarter

- TTU – SaRodrick Thompson 1-yard run (Jonathan Garibay kick), 4:51. Red Raiders 7–0. Drive: 10 plays, 58 yards, 4:27.
- TTU – SaRodrick Thompson 1-yard run (Jonathan Garibay kick), 0:08. Red Raiders 14–0. Drive: 6 plays, 34 yards, 2:49.

Second quarter

- TTU – Jonathan Garibay 33-yard field goal, 0:00. Red Raiders 17–0. Drive: 12 plays, 59 yards, 1:57.

Third quarter

- WVU – Leddie Brown 4-yard run (Casey Legg kick), 11:59. Red Raiders 17–7. Drive: 7 plays, 75 yards, 3:01.
- WVU – Casey Legg 36-yard field goal, 5:47. Red Raiders 17–10. Drive: 9 plays, 46 yards, 3:43.
- WVU – Isaiah Esdale 14-yard pass from Jarret Doege (Casey Legg kick), 1:15. Tied 17–17. Drive: 6 plays, 86 yards, 2:58.

Fourth quarter

- TTU – Jonathan Garibay 29-yard field goal, 11:46. Red Raiders 20–17. Drive: 9 plays, 62 yards, 4:29.
- WVU – Casey Legg 28-yard field goal, 4:34. Tied 20–20. Drive: 13 plays, 64 yards, 7:12.
- TTU – Jonathan Garibay 32-yard field goal, 0:18. Red Raiders 23–20. Drive: 8 plays, 70 yards, 4:16.

Top passers

- TTU – Henry Colombi – 23/34, 266 yards
- WVU – Jarret Doege – 25/33, 318 yards, TD

Top rushers

- TTU – SaRodrick Thompson – 12 rushes, 48 yards, 2 TD
- WVU – Leddie Brown – 17 rushes, 57 yards, TD

Top receivers

- TTU – Kaylon Geiger – 7 receptions, 82 yards
- WVU – Isaiah Esdale – 6 receptions, 113 yards, TD

The Red Raiders scored 17 unanswered points in the first half, with two touchdown runs from SaRodrick Thompson in the first quarter and a 33-yard field goal from Jonathan Garibay in the second right before halftime. Texas Tech's offense would struggle in the second half, being shut out completely in the third quarter while West Virginia scored 17 points to tie the game at 17–17 heading into the fourth quarter. In the fourth, the Red Raiders' defense held the Mountaineers to only a field goal. Following the field goal, the Red Raiders' offense would march down the field on a drive that lasted for over 4 minutes, ending the drive with a 32-yard field goal from Garibay with 18 seconds left. On the ensuing kickoff, Trey Wolff squibbed the ball, with Winston Wright Jr. recovering the ball and taking a knee at the West Virginia 9-yard line. Jarret Doege would throw a 29-yard pass to Isaiah Esdale then threw a pass intended for Sam James that fell incomplete as time expired, giving Texas Tech a 23–20 victory.

With the win, the Red Raiders improved to 4–1, 1–1 in conference play, and won their third straight against West Virginia.

=== TCU ===
TCU Horned Frogs at Texas Tech Red Raiders – Game summary

Quarter	1	2	3	4	Total
Horned Frogs	14	21	10	7	52
Red Raiders	7	3	14	7	31

at Jones AT&T Stadium, Lubbock, Texas

- Date: October 9
- Game time: 6:00 p.m.
- Game weather: Temperature: 94 °F (34 °C) • Weather: Sunny • Wind: SW 18 MPH
- Game attendance: 55,821
- Referee: Brandon Cruse
- TV announcers (ESPN): Mark Jones (play-by-play), Robert Griffin III (analyst) and Quint Kessenich (sideline)
- Box score, Recap

Game information

First quarter

- TCU – Quincy Brown 4-yard pass from Max Duggan (Griffin Kell kick), 11:46. Horned Frogs 7–0. Drive: 7 plays, 75 yards, 3:14.
- TCU – Kendre Miller 33-yard run (Griffin Kell kick), 6:29. Horned Frogs 14–0. Drive: 8 plays, 79 yards, 4:06.
- TTU – SaRodrick Thompson 4-yard run (Jonathan Garibay kick), 2:26. Horned Frogs 14–7. Drive: 8 plays, 75 yards, 4:03.

Second quarter

- TCU – Zach Evans 7-yard run (Griffin Kell kick), 14:55. Horned Frogs 21–7. Drive: 6 plays, 75 yards, 2:31.
- TCU – Tre-Vius Hodges-Tomlinson 29-yard interception return (Griffin Kell kick), 14:46. Horned Frogs 28–7.
- TTU – Jonathan Garibay 38-yard field goal, 8:12. Horned Frogs 28–10. Drive: 15 plays, 55 yards, 6:34.
- TCU – Zach Evans 1-yard run (Griffin Kell kick), 1:35. Horned Frogs 35–10. Drive: 14 plays, 75 yards, 6:37.

Third quarter

- TCU – Griffin Kell 48-yard field goal, 10:05. Horned Frogs 38–10. Drive: 7 plays, 33 yards, 3:01.
- TTU – SaRodrick Thompson 1-yard run (Jonathan Garibay kick), 7:31. Horned Frogs 38–17. Drive: 4 plays, 75 yards, 1:34.
- TCU – Kendre Miller 75-yard run (Griffin Kell kick), 7:18. Horned Frogs 45–17. Drive: 1 play, 75 yards, 0:13.
- TTU – Xavier White 4-yard run (Jonathan Garibay kick), 5:58. Horned Frogs 45–24. Drive: 3 plays, 75 yards, 1:20.

Fourth quarter

- TTU – SaRodrick Thompson 6-yard run (Jonathan Garibay kick), 5:00. Horned Frogs 45–31. Drive: 13 plays, 68 yards, 3:46.
- TCU – Kendre Miller 45-yard run (Griffin Kell kick), 4:51. Horned Frogs 52–31. Drive: 1 play, 45 yards, 0:09.

Top passers

- TCU – Max Duggan – 8/10, 104 yards, TD
- TTU – Henry Colombi – 23/41, 344 yards, INT

Top rushers

- TCU – Kendre Miller – 12 rushes, 185 yards, 3 TD
- TTU – SaRodrick Thompson – 18 rushes, 118 yards, 3 TD

Top receivers

- TCU – Blair Conwright – 3 receptions, 46 yards
- TTU – Kaylon Geiger – 6 receptions, 99 yards

The Texas Tech defense gave up 394 rushing yards, with TCU running backs Kendre Miller and Zach Evans both finishing with over 100 yards rushing.

=== At Kansas ===
Texas Tech Red Raiders at Kansas Jayhawks – Game summary

Quarter	1	2	3	4	Total
Red Raiders	7	17	14	3	41
Jayhawks	0	0	0	14	14

at David Booth Kansas Memorial Stadium, Lawrence, Kansas

- Date: October 16
- Game time: 3:00 p.m.
- Game weather: Temperature: 69 °F (21 °C) • Weather: Sunny • Wind: W 10 MPH
- Game attendance: 25,106
- Referee: Derek Anderson
- TV announcers (ESPN+): Roy Philpott (play-by-play), Ryan Leaf (analyst) and Taylor Davis (sideline)
- Box score, Recap

Game information

First quarter

- TTU – Henry Colombi 1-yard run (Jonathan Garibay kick), 10:24. Red Raiders 7–0. Drive: 10 plays, 75 yards, 4:32.

Second quarter

- TTU – Jonathan Garibay 28-yard field goal, 11:37. Red Raiders 10–0. Drive: 8 plays, 31 yards, 3:10.
- TTU – Erik Ezukanma 9-yard run (Jonathan Garibay kick), 5:28. Red Raiders 17–0. Drive: 10 plays, 55 yards, 4:50.
- TTU – Myles Price 7-yard run (Jonathan Garibay kick), 0:32. Red Raiders 24–0. Drive: 7 plays, 64 yards, 2:15.

Third quarter

- TTU – Donovan Smith 5-yard run (Jonathan Garibay kick), 6:50. Red Raiders 31–0. Drive: 11 plays, 92 yards, 4:27.
- TTU – Travis Koontz 2-yard pass from Henry Colombi (Jonathan Garibay kick), 1:57. Red Raiders 38–0. Drive: 5 plays, 57 yards, 2:15.

Fourth quarter

- TTU – Jonathan Garibay 48-yard field goal, 6:29. Red Raiders 41–0. Drive: 9 plays, 32 yards, 5:09.
- KU – Luke Grimm 14-yard pass from Miles Kendrick (Jacob Borcila kick), 0:52. Red Raiders 41–7. Drive: 10 plays, 75 yards, 5:36.
- KU – Lawrence Arnold 13-yard pass from Miles Kendrick (Jacob Borcila kick), 0:10. Red Raiders 41–14. Drive: 5 plays, 35 yards, 0:36.

Top passers

- TTU – Henry Colombi – 14/20, 124 yards, TD, INT
- KU – Jason Bean – 11/21, 80 yards, INT

Top rushers

- TTU – SaRodrick Thompson – 13 rushes, 83 yards
- KU – Devin Neal – 15 rushes, 54 yards

Top receivers

- TTU – Erik Ezukanma – 5 receptions, 76 yards
- KU – Luke Grimm – 3 receptions, 33 yards, TD

Texas Tech held Kansas scoreless for most of the game, with the Jayhawks' first score coming with 0:52 left in the game. On the following drive, backup running back Nehemiah Martinez fumbled the ball and it was recovered by Kans Edwin White-Schultz for the Jayhawks. The fumble recovery would lead to another Kansas touchdown, with backup quarterback throwing a 13-yard pass to Lawrence Arnold with 0:10 left. Texas Tech fourth-string quarterback Behren Morton would take a knee to end the game. The Red Raiders finished the game with 438 yards of offense while the Jayhawks only had 273, with many of those yards coming against reserve players. Third string quarterback Donovan Smith saw more playing time during the game, finishing 4-of-5 for 70 yards along with 37 yards rushing and a touchdown.

=== Kansas State ===
Kansas State Wildcats at Texas Tech Red Raiders – Game summary

Quarter	1	2	3	4	Total
Wildcats	0	10	9	6	25
Red Raiders	14	10	0	0	24

at Jones AT&T Stadium, Lubbock, Texas

- Date: October 23
- Game time: 11:00 a.m.
- Game weather: Temperature: 72 °F (22 °C) • Weather: Sunny • Wind: SW 15 MPH
- Game attendance: 52,874
- Referee: Tutu Salaam
- TV announcers (FS1): Tim Brando (play-by-play) and Spencer Tillman (analyst)
- Box score, Recap

Game information

First quarter

- TTU – Erik Ezukanma 45-yard run (Jonathan Garibay kick), 14:30. Red Raiders 7–0. Drive: 2 plays, 75 yards, 0:30.
- TTU – SaRodrick Thompson 1-yard run (Jonathan Garibay kick), 11:31. Red Raiders 14–0. Drive: 6 plays, 23 yards, 2:34.

Second quarter

- KSU – Deuce Vaughn 1-yard run (Taiten Winkel kick), 13:55. Red Raiders 14–7. Drive: 14 plays, 78 yards, 10:04.
- TTU – SaRodrick Thompson 4-yard run (Jonathan Garibay kick), 9:20. Red Raiders 21–7. Drive: 10 plays, 75 yards, 4:35.
- KSU – Taiten Winkel 24-yard field goal, 2:40. Red Raiders 21–10. Drive: 6 plays, 29 yards, 2:50.
- TTU – Jonathan Garibay 27-yard field goal, 0:00. Red Raiders 24–10. Drive: 10 plays, 66 yards, 2:40.

Third quarter

- KSU – SaRodrick Thompson tackled in end zone, 12:40. Red Raiders 24–12.
- KSU – Deuce Vaughn 2-yard run (Taiten Winkel kick), 9:08. Red Raiders 24–19. Drive: 6 plays, 69 yards, 3:25.

Fourth quarter

- KSU – Deuce Vaughn 22-yard pass from Skylar Thompson (pass failed), 6:09. Wildcats 25–24. Drive: 9 plays, 66 yards, 5:34.

Top passers

- KSU – Skylar Thompson – 24/30, 296 yards, TD
- TTU – Henry Colombi – 10/17, 148 yards, INT

Top rushers

- KSU – Deuce Vaughn – 14 rushes, 52 yards, TD
- TTU – SaRodrick Thompson – 11 rushes, 46 yards, 2 TD

Top receivers

- KSU – Deuce Vaughn – 7 receptions, 68 yards, TD
- TTU – Myles Price – 4 receptions, 64 yards

Texas Tech scored fast. On the second play of the game, Erik Ezukanma ran a 45-yard touchdown run. On the ensuing kickoff, Malik Knowles fumbled and Tyrique Matthews recovered the ball at the 23-yard-line which led the Red Raiders to be up 14-0.

The Red Raiders had a 24–10 lead at halftime, but were shutout in the second half as Kansas State scored 15 unanswered points. On the following Monday, head coach Matt Wells was fired, with offensive coordinator Sonny Cumbie being named interim head coach.

=== At No. 4 Oklahoma ===
Texas Tech Red Raiders at No.4 Oklahoma Sooners – Game summary

Quarter	1	2	3	4	Total
Red Raiders	7	0	7	7	21
No. 4 Sooners	14	14	10	14	52

at Gaylord Family Oklahoma Memorial Stadium, Norman, Oklahoma

- Date: October 30
- Game time: 2:30 p.m.
- Game weather: Temperature: 72 °F (22 °C) • Weather: Sunny • Wind: SW 8 MPH
- Game attendance: 82,732
- Referee: Scott Campbell
- TV announcers (ABC): Dave Pasch (play-by-play), Dusty Dvoracek (analyst) and Tom Luginbill (sideline)
- Box score, Recap

Game information

First quarter

- OU – Mario Williams 22-yard pass from Caleb Williams (Gabe Brkic kick), 6:32. Sooners 7–0. Drive: 7 plays, 95 yards, 3:08.
- TTU – Erik Ezukanma 17-yard pass from Henry Colombi (Jonathan Garibay kick), 2:31. Tied 7–7. Drive: 8 plays, 83 yards, 3:54.
- OU – Marvin Mims 67-yard pass from Caleb Williams (Gabe Brkic kick), 1:07. Sooners 14–7. Drive: 3 plays, 78 yards, 1:17.

Second quarter

- OU – Brayden Willis 8-yard pass from Caleb Williams (Gabe Brkic kick), 10:11. Sooners 21–7. Drive: 8 plays, 91 yards, 3:56.
- OU – Drake Stoops 12-yard pass from Caleb Williams (Gabe Brkic kick), 7:26. Sooners 28–7. Drive: 2 plays, 17 yards, 0:56.

Third quarter

- OU – Gabe Brkic 53-yard field goal, 9:44. Sooners 31–7. Drive: 11 plays, 39 yards, 5:16.
- OU – Marvin Mims 43-yard pass from Caleb Williams (Gabe Brkic kick), 5:52. Sooners 38–7. Drive: 1 play, 43 yards, 0:08.
- TTU – J. J. Sparkman 17-yard pass from Donovan Smith (Jonathan Garibay kick), 0:44. Sooners 38–14. Drive: 10 plays, 75 yards, 5:08.

Fourth quarter

- OU – Austin Stogner 9-yard pass from Caleb Williams (Gabe Brkic kick), 10:56. Sooners 45–14. Drive: 8 plays, 75 yards, 4:48.
- OU – Brian Darby 42-yard pass from Spencer Rattler (Gabe Brkic kick), 6:10. Sooners 52–14. Drive: 4 plays, 49 yards, 1:31.
- TTU – Xavier White 1-yard run (Jonathan Garibay kick), 3:29. Sooners 52–21. Drive: 6 plays, 62 yards, 2:36.

Top passers

- TTU – Donovan Smith – 17/22, 192 yards, TD, INT
- OU – Caleb Williams – 23/30, 402 yards, 6 TD

Top rushers

- TTU – Xavier White – 10 rushes, 42 yards, TD
- OU – Kennedy Brooks – 8 rushes, 35 yards

Top receivers

- TTU – Erik Ezukanma – 8 receptions, 123 yards, TD
- OU – Marvin Mims – 4 receptions, 135 yards, 2 TD

Starting quarterback Henry Colombi left the game in the second quarter after being shaken up on a tackle. He was replaced by redshirt freshman Donovan Smith for the rest of the game.

=== Iowa State ===
Iowa State Cyclones at Texas Tech Red Raiders – Game summary

Quarter	1	2	3	4	Total
Cyclones	7	7	7	17	38
Red Raiders	14	17	0	10	41

at Jones AT&T Stadium, Lubbock, Texas

- Date: November 13
- Game time: 2:30 p.m.
- Game weather: Sunny
- Game attendance: 47,158
- Referee: Michael Vandervelde
- TV announcers (ESPN2): Beth Mowins (play-by-play), Kirk Morrison (analyst) and Dawn Davenport (sideline)
- Box score, Recap

Game information

First quarter

- TTU – Tahj Brooks 14-yard run (Jonathan Garibay kick), 10:42. Red Raiders 7–0. Drive: 7 plays, 75 yards, 4:18.
- ISU – Breece Hall 1-yard run (Andrew Mevis kick), 6:15. Tied 7–7. Drive: 2 plays, 16 yards, 0:34.
- TTU – Myles Price 39-yard pass from Donovan Smith (Jonathan Garibay kick), 4:26. Red Raiders 14–7. Drive: 5 plays, 75 yards, 1:49.

Second quarter

- TTU – Erik Ezukanma 3-yard pass from Donovan Smith (Jonathan Garibay kick), 6:14. Red Raiders 21–7. Drive: 15 plays, 70 yards, 8:51.
- TTU – Erik Ezukanma 10-yard pass from Donovan Smith (Jonathan Garibay kick), 3:16. Red Raiders 28–7. Drive: 3 plays, 71 yards, 1:20.
- ISU – Breece Hall 17-yard run (Andrew Mevis kick), 1:11. Red Raiders 28–14. Drive: 7 plays, 75 yards, 2:05.
- TTU – Jonathan Garibay 45-yard field goal, 0:00. Red Raiders 31–14. Drive: 6 plays, 48 yards, 1:11.

Third quarter

- ISU – Charlie Kolar 9-yard pass from Brock Purdy (Andrew Mevis kick), 3:03. Red Raiders 31–21. Drive: 7 plays, 73 yards, 2:14.

Fourth quarter

- ISU – Charlie Kolar 12-yard pass from Brock Purdy (Andrew Mevis kick), 13:29. Red Raiders 31–28. Drive: 7 plays, 75 yards, 2:50.
- TTU – SaRodrick Thompson 13-yard run (Jonathan Garibay kick), 10:51. Red Raiders 38–28. Drive: 6 plays, 75 yards, 2:38.
- ISU – Breece Hall 14-yard pass from Brock Purdy (Andrew Mevis kick), 6:20. Red Raiders 38–35. Drive: 8 plays, 75 yards, 4:31.
- ISU – Andrew Mevis 29-yard field goal, 1:00. Tied 38–38. Drive: 15 plays, 68 yards, 3:36.
- TTU – Jonathan Garibay 62-yard field goal, 0:00. Red Raiders 41–38. Drive: 7 plays, 31 yards, 1:00.

Top passers

- ISU – Brock Purdy – 32/42, 356 yards, 2 TD, 2 INT
- TTU – Donovan Smith – 25/32, 322 yards, 3 TD, INT

Top rushers

- ISU – Breece Hall – 18 rushes, 51 yards, 2 TD
- TTU – Tahj Brooks – 9 rushes, 80 yards, TD

Top receivers

- ISU – Xavier Hutchinson – 8 receptions, 112 yards
- TTU – Myles Price – 9 receptions, 175 yards, TD

Redshirt freshman Donovan Smith made his first start at quarterback, with Tyler Shough still recovering from a broken collarbone and Henry Colombi out due to an illness. The Red Raiders had a 31–14 lead at halftime, but the Cyclones went on a 24–7 run in the second half to tie the game at 38–38 with a minute left in regulation. With no timeouts, Smith led the offense down to the Iowa State 44-yard line before kicker Jonathan Garibay was sent out to try the game-winning field goal with three seconds left. Garibay's kick, a 62-yard attempt, was good, giving Texas Tech a 41–38 victory to become Bowl eligible for the first time since the 2017 season; the win was also Texas Tech's first win over Iowa State since 2015. Garibay's 62-yard game-winning field goal set the record for longest field goal of the 2021 season.

=== No. 9 Oklahoma State ===
No.9 Oklahoma State Cowboys at Texas Tech Red Raiders – Game summary

Quarter	1	2	3	4	Total
No. 9 Cowboys	3	10	3	7	23
Red Raiders	0	0	0	0	0

at Jones AT&T Stadium, Lubbock, Texas

- Date: November 20
- Game time: 7:00 p.m.
- Game weather: Sunny
- Game attendance: 53,169
- Referee: David Alvarez
- TV announcers (Fox): Tim Brando (play-by-play) and Spencer Tillman (analyst)
- Box score, Recap

Game information

First quarter

- OKST – Tanner Brown 24-yard field goal, 10:02. Cowboys 3–0. Drive: 12 plays, 70 yards, 3:56.

Second quarter

- OKST – Tanner Brown 33-yard field goal, 10:19. Cowboys 6–0. Drive: 8 plays, 65 yards, 1:53.
- OKST – John Paul Richardson 14-yard pass from Spencer Sanders (Tanner Brown kick), 0:26. Cowboys 13–0. Drive: 13 plays, 80 yards, 3:52.

Third quarter

- OKST – Tanner Brown 19-yard field goal, 9:49. Cowboys 16–0. Drive: 7 plays, 23 yards, 2:11.

Fourth quarter

- OKST – Spencer Sanders 9-yard run (Tanner Brown kick), 14:26. Cowboys 23–0. Drive: 9 plays, 75 yards, 4:45.

Top passers

- OKST – Spencer Sanders – 19/37, 239 yards, TD
- TTU – Donovan Smith – 9/28, 83 yards

Top rushers

- OKST – Dominic Richardson – 20 rushes, 84 yards
- TTU – Behren Morton – 2 rushes, 15 yards

Top receivers

- OKST – Tay Martin – 7 receptions, 130 yards
- TTU – Mason Tharp – 3 receptions, 39 yards

Starting quarterback Donovan Smith was pulled from the game midway through the third quarter and was replaced by Behren Morton; Smith would re-enter the game in the fourth quarter. This was the Red Raiders' first shutout loss since the 1996 Alamo Bowl.

=== At No. 8 Baylor ===
Texas Tech Red Raiders at No. 8 Baylor Bears – Game summary

Quarter	1	2	3	4	Total
Red Raiders	3	7	0	14	24
No. 8 Bears	10	7	0	10	27

at McLane Stadium, Waco, Texas

- Date: November 27
- Game time: 11:00 a.m.
- Game weather: Temperature: 49 °F (9 °C) • Weather: Cloudy • Wind: SW 8 MPH
- Game attendance: 43,901
- Referee: Brandon Cruse
- TV announcers (FS1): Dan Hellie (play-by-play) and Robert Smith (analyst)
- Box score, Recap

Game information

First quarter

- BAY – Trestan Ebner 61-yard pass from Blake Shapen (Isaiah Hankins kick), 13:42. Bears 7–0. Drive: 3 plays, 75 yards, 1:18.
- BAY – Isaiah Hankins 28-yard field goal, 10:50. Bears 10–0. Drive: 6 plays, 32 yards, 2:34.
- TTU – Jonathan Garibay 46-yard field goal, 6:06. Bears 10–3. Drive: 9 plays, 47 yards, 4:44.

Second quarter

- BAY – Abram Smith 4-yard run (Isaiah Hankins kick), 5:01. Bears 17–3. Drive: 5 plays, 24 yards, 2:17.
- TTU – Tahj Brooks 1-yard run (Jonathan Garibay kick), 1:08. Bears 17–10. Drive: 9 plays, 75 yards, 3:53.

Third quarter

- No scoring plays

Fourth quarter

- BAY – Isaiah Hankins 27-yard field goal, 13:31. Bears 20–10. Drive: 16 plays, 69 yards, 6:27.
- TTU – McLane Mannix 38-yard pass from Donovan Smith (Jonathan Garibay kick), 11:37. Bears 20–17. Drive: 5 plays, 75 yards, 1:54.
- BAY – Ben Sims 9-yard pass from Blake Shapen (Isaiah Hankins kick), 7:00. Bears 27–17. Drive: 10 plays, 58 yards, 4:30.
- TTU – Travis Koontz 75-yard pass from Donovan Smith (Jonathan Garibay kick), 6:40. Bears 27–24. Drive: 2 plays, 75 yards, 0:20.

Top passers

- TTU – Donovan Smith – 15/23, 263 yards, 2 TD
- BAY – Blake Shapen – 20/34, 254 yards, 2 TD

Top rushers

- TTU – Tahj Brooks – 14 rushes, 40 yards, TD
- BAY – Abram Smith – 30 rushes, 117 yards, TD

Top receivers

- TTU – Travis Koontz – 5 receptions, 117 yards, TD
- BAY – Trestan Ebner – 4 receptions, 118 yards, TD

Baylor scored just over a minute into the game, with quarterback Blake Shapen throwing a 61-yard touchdown pass to running back Trestan Ebner. The Red Raiders fumbled the ball on their first offensive play, with running back SaRodrick Thompson losing the ball on a tackle and Jairon McVea recovering it at the Texas Tech 42-yard line for the Bears. Texas Tech's defense would hold Baylor to field goal on the ensuing drive, with Isaiah Hankins making a 28-yard field goal. The Red Raiders would respond on the next drive with a 46-yard field goal from Jonathan Garibay. The Red Raiders' first offensive drive of the 2nd quarter would end with another fumble, as quarterback Donovan Smith lost the ball on a sack with Raleigh Texada recovering it for the Bears. Baylor would capitalize on the turnover, with a 4-yard touchdown run from Abram Smith. Texas Tech would respond on the following drive with a 1-yard touchdown run from Tahj Brooks, the team's first touchdown of the game.

=== Vs. Mississippi State (Liberty Bowl) ===
Mississippi State Bulldogs vs. Texas Tech Red Raiders (Liberty Bowl) – Game summary

Quarter	1	2	3	4	Total
Bulldogs	0	7	0	0	7
Red Raiders	10	3	14	7	34

at Liberty Bowl Memorial Stadium, Memphis, Tennessee

- Date: December 28
- Game time: 5:45 p.m.
- Game weather: Temperature: 69 °F (21 °C) • Weather: Cloudy • Wind: S 10 MPH
- Game attendance: 48,615
- Referee: Riley Johnson
- TV announcers (ESPN): Dave Neal (play-by-play), Deuce McAllister (analyst), and Andraya Carter (sideline)
- Box score, Recap

Game information

First quarter

- TTU – Tahj Brooks 19-yard run (Jonathan Garibay kick), 12:40. Red Raiders 7–0. Drive: 7 plays, 75 yards, 2:20.
- TTU – Jonathan Garibay 31-yard field goal, 3:03. Red Raiders 10–0. Drive: 14 plays, 79 yards, 6:24.

Second quarter

- MSST – Rara Thomas 17-yard pass from Will Rogers (Nolan McCord kick), 14:08. Red Raiders 10–7. Drive: 10 plays, 75 yards, 3:55.
- TTU – Jonathan Garibay 26-yard field goal, 0:13. Red Raiders 13–7. Drive: 4 plays, 6 yards, 0:18.

Third quarter

- TTU – Donovan Smith 1-yard run (Johnathan Garibay kick), 9:03. Red Raiders 20–7. Drive: 4 plays, 95 yards, 1:00.
- TTU – J. J. Sparkman 14-yard pass from Donovan Smith (Jonathan Garibay kick), 0:02. Red Raiders 27–7. Drive: 8 plays, 60 yards, 4:04.

Fourth quarter

- TTU – SaRodrick Thompson 1-yard run (Jonathan Garibay kick), 8:47. Red Raiders 34–7. Drive: 8 plays, 85 yards, 3:42.

Top passers

- MSST – Will Rogers – 32/53, 290 yards, TD, INT
- TTU – Donovan Smith – 15/28, 252 yards, TD

Top rushers

- MSST – Dillon Johnson – 9 rushes, 62 yards
- TTU – Tahj Brooks – 16 rushes, 107 yards, TD

Top receivers

- MSST – Austin Williams – 5 receptions, 74 yards
- TTU – Myles Price – 3 receptions, 72 yards

The Red Raiders finished off the season against the Mississippi State Bulldogs, led by former head coach Mike Leach, in the Liberty Bowl. Texas Tech scored on its opening drive and never trailed in the game. The Red Raiders finished the game with 512 yards of offense and committed no turnovers, while the defense held the Bulldogs to just 344 yards and forced three turnovers, including a turnover on special teams. Texas Tech quarterback Donovan Smith was named the game's MVP.

== Statistics ==
Scores against non-conference opponents

	1	2	3	4	Total
Opponents	28	27	7	9	71
Texas Tech	24	38	54	38	154

Scores against the Big 12

	1	2	3	4	Total
Opponents	62	97	77	88	324
Texas Tech	66	71	49	54	240

Scores against all opponents

	1	2	3	4	Total
Opponents	90	114	84	94	382
Texas Tech	90	109	103	92	394

== Weekly awards ==
- Big 12 Defensive Player of the Week

Riko Jeffers (week 1 vs. Houston)
Colin Schooler (week 5 vs. West Virginia)

- Big 12 Special Teams Player of the Week

Jonathan Garibay (week 5 vs. West Virginia)
Jonathan Garibay (week 11 vs. Iowa State)

- Big 12 Newcomer of the Week

Reggie Pearson Jr. (week 1 vs. Houston)
Donovan Smith (week 11 vs. Iowa State)

== Players drafted into the NFL ==
Round	Pick	Player	Position	NFL Club
4	125	Erik Ezukanma	WR	Miami Dolphins
7	246	Dawson Deaton	C	Cleveland Browns
