= Tyler Shough =

American football player (born 1999)

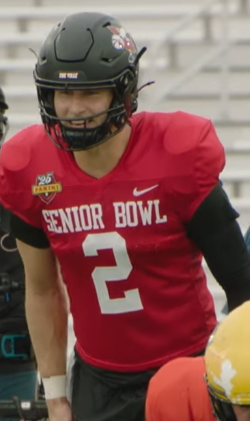
- Shough at the 2025 Senior Bowl

No. 6 – New Orleans Saints
- Position: Quarterback
- Roster status: Active

Personal information
- Born: September 28, 1999 (age 27); Chandler, Arizona, U.S.
- Listed height: 6 ft 5 in (1.96 m)
- Listed weight: 219 lb (99 kg)

Career information
- High school: Hamilton (Chandler)
- College: Oregon (2018−2020); Texas Tech (2021–2023); Louisville (2024)
- NFL draft: 2025: 2nd round, 40th overall pick

Career history
- New Orleans Saints (2025–present)

Awards and highlights
- PFWA All-Rookie Team (2025)

Career NFL statistics as of Week 10, 2026
- Passing attempts: 670
- Passing completions: 450
- Completion percentage: 67.2%
- TD–INT: 25–13
- Passing yards: 4,557
- Passer rating: 90.7
- Rushing yards: 373
- Rushing touchdowns: 5
- Stats at Pro Football Reference

Tyler James Shough (/ʃʌk/ SHUCK; born September 28, 1999) is an American professional football quarterback for the New Orleans Saints of the National Football League (NFL). He played college football for the Oregon Ducks, Texas Tech Red Raiders and Louisville Cardinals. Shough was selected by the Saints in the second round of the 2025 NFL draft.

== Early life ==
Shough is a native of Chandler, Arizona, and Glenn and Dana Shough's fourth of five children. Shough's parents met as students at Arizona State University. His father Glenn is a retired police officer, currently teaching criminal justice and driver's education, and his mother Dana is a retired educator. In 2009, Dana was diagnosed with stage 4 metastatic breast cancer.

His elder sisters attended Hamilton High School in Chandler, where Shough and his younger brother Brady played in the football program. According to the family, he was special friends with future Major League Baseball player Cody Bellinger while they were students at Hamilton.

Shough became the starting varsity quarterback as a junior at the high-profile Hamilton High School football program in the 2016 season. His performance garnered an honorable mention in Arizona's 6A Premier League, listed in the 6th toughest football regions in the nation for 2016. The team ended their season in the 6A quarterfinals with a 7–5 record, the worst in the school's history until they scored 3–7 in 2018.

As a senior, Shough played for Hamilton in its 2017 season when allegations of hazing were publicized, which resulted in the conviction of three players and the permanent reassignment of three administrators, including head coach Steve Belles, to Chandler Unified School District (CUSD) offices. Shough was not implicated in the scandal. His team made it to the 6A state quarterfinals, and he earned a first-team 6A Premier League and all-CUSD awards. He was also selected as a Semper Fidelis All-American, from the US Marine Corps. Hamilton had an overall 15–9 record with Shough as a starter setting school records with the most losses, completions, attempts, yards, and touchdowns in the school's 20-year history.

Shough was a highly sought after player being a consensus 4-star pro-style quarterback by both Scout and 247Sports. Scout ranked him 16th best at quarterback and 183rd best player overall nationwide. Multiple athletic scholarships were offered from the University of Alabama, University of California, Berkeley, University of Georgia, Florida State University, University of Michigan, University of South Carolina, and Indiana State University. After an initial verbal commitment to University of North Carolina at Chapel Hill in June 2017, Shough signed an early letter of intent to the University of Oregon to play for the Ducks in December 2017.

== College career ==
=== Oregon (2018–2020) ===
Shough appeared in three games, and played 18 snaps before redshirting the rest of the 2018 season.

As a redshirt freshman, Shough served as the Ducks' backup quarterback during the 2019 season behind Justin Herbert, finishing the season with 144 yards and three touchdowns in eight games played off the bench.

Going into 2020, Oregon head coach Mario Cristobal indicated early that Shough would be the starting quarterback, with Justin Herbert having been drafted by the Los Angeles Chargers. Oregon and the other Pac-12 conference member schools began play in November with strict policies regarding testing, positivity rate, and contact tracing for the COVID-19 pandemic. Shough became the starter, winning the season opener against Stanford 35–14. Shough started every game including the Pac-12 Championship Game, a 31–24 win against USC.

Shough's performance was questioned when heavily favored Oregon lost back-to-back games against Oregon State and California. Due to the losses, Oregon would not have made it to the Pac-12 championship if Washington had not canceled a regular-season game against Oregon due to COVID-19 restrictions, a game that would have decided the Pac-12 North race between Oregon and Washington. Despite Shough starting the Pac-12 Championship Game against USC, Boston College transfer Anthony Brown began to take offensive series.

Oregon was selected to the Fiesta Bowl held in Glendale, Arizona, which is in the Phoenix Metropolitan Area where Shough grew up. The opponent was Iowa State, led by quarterback Brock Purdy of Gilbert, Arizona. Oregon lost the game, but a 98-yard touchdown drive orchestrated by Brown made the quarterback position uncertain. On February 12, 2021, Shough entered the NCAA Transfer Portal with three years of eligibility left.

=== Texas Tech (2021–2023) ===
On February 22, 2021, Shough announced that he was transferring to Texas Tech University to play for the Red Raiders. Arriving at Texas Tech, Shough battled for the starting quarterback position against senior Henry Colombi and freshmen Maverick McIvor, Donovan Smith, and Behren Morton. In the team's spring game, Shough led the team in passing, finishing 8-of-15 for 106 yards. On August 24, head coach Matt Wells announced that Shough would be the starter for the team's week one game against Houston. In his first start for Texas Tech, Shough finished 17-of-24 for 231 yards with one touchdown along with a rushing touchdown as the Red Raiders won 38–21. During the team's week 4 game against Texas, Shough broke his collarbone.

Prior to the 2022 season, Shough was in a competition for the starting quarterback position against sophomore Donovan Smith. On August 21, Shough was named the team's week one starter against Murray State. Against Murray State, Shough exited the game after the first quarter due to a left shoulder injury and would be out for at least two weeks. In the regular season finale against Oklahoma, Shough finished with a career-high 436 passing yards in the 51–48 overtime victory. In the Texas Bowl against Ole Miss, Shough finished the game with 242 passing yards and a touchdown along with a career-high 111 rushing yards and two rushing touchdowns in the 42–25 victory, being named the game's MVP.

In week 4 of the 2023 season, in the first quarter against West Virginia, Shough appeared to have rolled his ankle on a run then rolled it again on the following play attempting a pass. After the second play, Shough went down and was eventually carted off the field with an air cast on his left ankle. It was later revealed that Shough had a broken fibula and would need surgery. He entered the transfer portal for the second time on November 20, 2023.

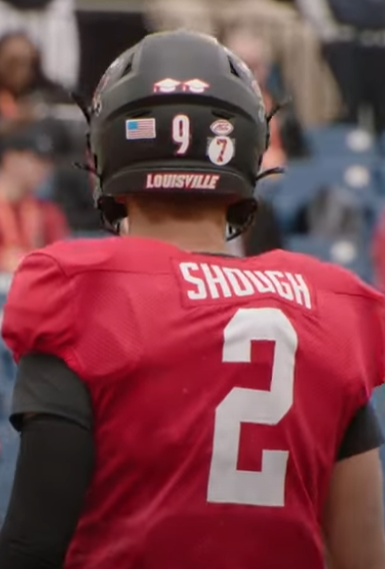
Shough at the 2025 Senior Bowl.

=== Louisville (2024) ===
On December 5, 2023, it was announced that Shough had transferred to the University of Louisville to play for the Cardinals. During the 2024 season, Shough led the Cardinals as QB1 to a regular season record of 8–4, 5–3 in ACC play. Notable individual performances include a four-touchdown, 342 yards-passing showing in a 52–45 loss to the University of Miami (FL) at home, as well as playing a major role in the 33–21 upset win vs Clemson on the road.

For the 2024 season, Shough finished 14th in FBS in total yards (3,195 yds) and tied for 22nd in FBS in passing touchdowns (23 TDs).

At Louisville, as of the end of the 2024 regular season, Shough is 2nd all-time in yards per game passing (266.3) as well as second all time in touchdowns per game passing (1.92).

On December 11, 2024, Shough opted out the 2024 Sun Bowl between Louisville and Washington to prepare for the 2025 NFL draft. On December 17, 2024, Shough was among three winners for Comeback Player of the Year awarded by the College Sports Communicators (CSC) organization alongside Utah State DB Ike Larsen and South Carolina RB Raheim Sanders. On November 27, 2024, Shough accepted an invitation to the 2025 Senior Bowl.

== Professional career ==
Pre-draft measurables
Height	Weight	Arm length	Hand span	Wingspan	40-yard dash	10-yard split	20-yard split	Vertical jump	Broad jump
6 ft 4 7/8 in (1.95 m)	219 lb (99 kg)	30 3/4 in (0.78 m)	9 3/4 in (0.25 m)	6 ft 4 1/2 in (1.94 m)	4.63 s	1.61 s	2.69 s	32.0 in (0.81 m)	9 ft 9 in (2.97 m)
All values from NFL Combine

=== 2025 season ===
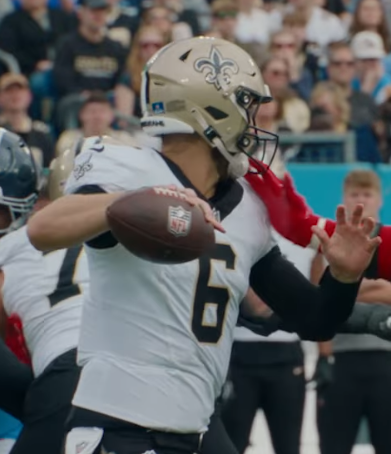
Shough with the New Orleans Saints in 2025

Shough was selected by the New Orleans Saints with the 40th overall pick in the second round of the 2025 NFL draft. He chose to wear jersey number 6. After the Saints' former starting quarterback Derek Carr announced his retirement after the draft, the team's head coach Kellen Moore declared that Shough, Spencer Rattler, and Jake Haener would compete for the starting role. On July 21, 2025, Shough signed a four-year contract with the team. Following a competition that lasted through the entirety of the preseason, Rattler was named the Saints starting quarterback for the 2025 season, with Shough being named his backup.

On September 21 in Week 3, Shough made his debut in the 13–44 blowout loss to the Seattle Seahawks, throwing two incomplete passes. On October 26 in the 23–3 Week 8 loss against the Tampa Bay Buccaneers, Shough entered the game in the third quarter after Rattler was benched for poor performance. He completed 17 out of 30 pass attempts for 128 yards and an interception. On October 28, Shough was named the starting quarterback after the Saints fell to 1–7 to start the season. On November 2, in Week 9 against the Los Angeles Rams, Shough made his NFL starting debut, where he completed 15 for 24 passes for 176 yards with one touchdown and one interception in the 34–10 loss. Shough started for the rest of the season, setting the franchise record for wins by a rookie quarterback. Shough was named the NFL Offensive Rookie of the Month for his play in December/January. He finished the season completing 221 of 327 passes for 2,384 yards with 10 touchdowns and six interceptions; he also rushed 45 times for 186 yards and 3 touchdowns.

== Career statistics ==
Legend
**Bold**	Career high

=== NFL ===
==== Regular season ====
Year	Team	Games			Passing										Rushing					Sacked		Fumbles	
Year	Team	GP	GS	Record	Cmp	Att	Pct	Yds	Y/A	Y/G	Lng	TD	Int	Rtg	Att	Yds	Y/A	Lng	TD	Sck	SckY	Fum	Lost
2025	NO	11	9	**5–4**	**221**	**327**	**67.6**	**2,384**	**7.3**	216.7	**62**	10	**6**	**91.3**	**45**	**186**	4.1	34	**3**	**31**	**195**	3	**2**
2026	NO	9	9	3–6	229	343	66.8	2,173	6.3	**241.4**	52	**15**	**7**	90.2	40	187	**4.7**	**36**	2	23	156	**9**	1
Career		20	18	7–10	450	670	67.2	4,557	6.8	227.9	62	25	13	90.7	85	373	4.4	36	5	54	351	12	3

=== College ===
Season	Team	Games			Passing								Rushing			
Season	Team	GP	GS	Record	Cmp	Att	Pct	Yds	Avg	TD	Int	Rtg	Att	Yds	Avg	TD
2018	Oregon	3	0	—	0	0	0.0	0	0.0	0	0	0.0	0	0	0.0	0
2019	Oregon	5	0	—	12	15	**80.0**	144	**9.6**	3	0	**226.6**	2	11	**5.5**	0
2020	Oregon	7	7	4–3	106	167	63.5	1,559	9.3	13	**6**	160.4	66	**271**	4.1	2
2021	Texas Tech	4	4	3–1	64	92	69.6	872	9.5	6	3	164.2	16	14	0.9	2
2022	Texas Tech	7	5	**5–0**	106	177	59.9	1,304	7.4	7	4	130.3	**72**	269	3.7	**4**
2023	Texas Tech	4	4	1–3	67	111	60.4	746	6.7	7	4	130.4	48	149	3.1	2
2024	Louisville	12	12	8–4	**244**	**389**	62.7	**3,195**	8.2	**23**	**6**	148.1	42	19	0.5	1
Career		42	32	21−11	599	951	63.0	7,820	8.2	59	23	147.7	246	733	3.0	11

== Personal life ==
Shough is a Christian. In 2019, Shough was baptized with Mycah Pittman.

Shough proposed to his girlfriend, former Oregon soccer player Jordan Wormdahl, on May 14, 2022 in Mexico using an NIL deal. They married on April 6, 2024. On February 18, 2026, Shough announced the birth of their first child, Grayson DuBois Shough.

In July 2025, he appeared on Kentucky governor Andy Beshear’s podcast and stated he would vote for Beshear if he ran for President of the United States.
