= Donovan Smith (quarterback) =

American football player (born 2001)

Profile
- Position: Quarterback

Personal information
- Born: October 27, 2001 (age 25); Las Vegas, Nevada, U.S.
- Listed height: 6 ft 4 in (1.93 m)
- Listed weight: 219 lb (99 kg)

Career information
- High school: Frenship (Wolfforth, Texas)
- College: Texas Tech (2020–2022); Houston (2023–2024)
- NFL draft: 2025: undrafted

Career history
- Houston Gamblers (2026)*; Birmingham Stallions (2026)
- * Offseason or practice squad member only

Donovan Lamont Smith (born October 27, 2001) is an American football quarterback. He played college football for the Houston Cougars and the Texas Tech Red Raiders.

== Early life ==
Smith originally attended Bishop Gorman High School in Las Vegas, Nevada, mainly playing as a wide receiver while also serving as the team's backup quarterback. Donovan would transfer to Frenship High School in the Lubbock, Texas suburb of Wolfforth prior to the 2019–20 school year. Smith finished his senior season completing 212-of-328 passes for 3,114 yards with 26 touchdowns and 8 interceptions along with 489 rushing yards and 14 rushing touchdowns. Smith finished his senior year with the 32nd-most passing yards in the state of Texas for the 2019 season.

Smith was listed as a three-star recruit by 247Sports.com coming out of high school. He committed to Texas Tech over Nevada, San Diego State, and Utah State.

=== High school statistics ===
Year	GP	Passing								Rushing				Receiving			
Year	GP	Cmp	Att	Pct	Yds	Y/A	TD	Int	Rtg	Att	Yds	Avg	TD	Rec	Yds	Avg	TD
2017	4	2	6	.333	16	2.7	0	0	42.4	11	80	7.3	1	0	0	0	0
2018	12	3	8	.375	83	10.4	1	0	116.1	9	13	1.4	2	49	806	16.4	8
2019	11	212	328	.646	3,114	9.5	26	8	111.8	96	489	5.1	14	1	3	3.0	1
Career	27	217	342	.635	3,213	9.4	27	8	110.7	116	582	5.0	17	50	809	16.2	9

== College career ==
=== Texas Tech ===
Smith suffered a shoulder injury prior to the 2020 season, and did not appear in any games during the season. He had surgery on his shoulder and returned to practice the following spring.

Smith entered the team's week nine game against Oklahoma in the second quarter after starter Henry Colombi was shaken up on a tackle. Smith made his first collegiate start in the team's week 11 game against Iowa State, with original starter Tyler Shough still recovering from a broken collarbone he suffered in week 4 and Colombi out due to an illness. Smith finished the game 25-of-32 for 322 yards with three touchdowns and one interception as the Red Raiders won 41–38, becoming bowl eligible for the first time since 2017. For his performance, Smith was named the Big 12 Newcomer of the Week. Following the game, interim head coach Sonny Cumbie stated that Smith would remain the team's starting quarterback. The Red Raiders were invited to the Liberty Bowl, playing against Mississippi State. Smith finished the game with 252 passing yards and a touchdown along with a rushing touchdown in the 34–7 win and was named the game's MVP.

Entering into the 2022 season, Smith was in a competition for the starting quarterback position against Tyler Shough and Behren Morton. Shough was named the team's week one starter on August 21. Shough started the game against Murray State, but exited the game after the first quarter due to a possible injury and was replaced by Smith. In Week 2, Smith started Texas Tech's game against no. 25 Houston. The Red Raiders jumped out to a 17–3 halftime lead, but the Cougars stormed back in the second half due in part to three interceptions by Smith, including one that was returned 54 yards for a touchdown. Houston took a 20–17 lead with 0:37 left in regulation before Smith led the offense down field to tie the game 20–20 with a 47-yard field goal from Trey Wolff; the Red Raiders would win the game 33–30 in double overtime, with Smith scoring the game-winning touchdown on a 9-yard run. Smith finished with a career-high 350 yards passing and three total touchdowns, two passing and one rushing. For his performance, Smith was named the Big 12 Offensive Player of the Week. Two weeks later, against no. 22 Texas, Smith threw for 331 yards and two touchdowns along with 42 rushing yards and a rushing touchdown in the 37–34 overtime victory. For his performance against Texas, Smith was named the Earl Campbell Tyler Rose Award National Player of the Week. In the regular season finale against Oklahoma, Smith had both a rushing and receiving touchdown. On December 5, it was announced that Smith would be entering the NCAA transfer portal.

=== Houston ===
On December 21, 2022, Smith transferred to Houston.

=== Statistics ===
Year	Team	Games			Passing								Rushing			
Year	Team	GP	GS	Record	Cmp	Att	Pct	Yds	Avg	TD	Int	Rtg	Att	Yds	Avg	TD
2020	Texas Tech	Redshirt														
2021	Texas Tech	11	4	2−2	86	140	61.4	1,182	8.4	7	2	146.0	57	154	2.7	3
2022	Texas Tech	12	4	2−2	146	221	66.1	1,505	6.8	12	8	133.9	76	116	1.5	7
2023	Houston	12	12	4−8	256	397	64.5	2,801	7.1	22	13	135.5	138	428	3.1	6
2024	Houston	9	5	1−4	87	133	65.4	867	6.5	4	8	118.1	65	147	2.3	3
Career		44	25	9–16	574	889	64.6	6,354	7.1	45	31	134.3	336	845	2.5	19

== Professional career ==
Pre-draft measurables
Height	Weight	Arm length	Hand span	Wingspan	40-yard dash	10-yard split	20-yard split	20-yard shuttle	Vertical jump	Broad jump
6 ft 4 1/8 in (1.93 m)	219 lb (99 kg)	32 1/2 in (0.83 m)	10 3/8 in (0.26 m)	6 ft 7 1/2 in (2.02 m)	4.66 s	1.64 s	2.67 s	4.32 s	37.0 in (0.94 m)	10 ft 2 in (3.10 m)
All values from Pro Day

On April 30, 2025, Smith received a rookie minicamp try out with the Dallas Cowboys.

=== Houston Gamblers ===
On January 12, 2026, Smith signed with the Houston Gamblers of the United Football League (UFL). He was released by the Gamblers on March 23.

=== Birmingham Stallions ===
On March 24, 2026, Smith signed with the Birmingham Stallions of the United Football League (UFL). He spent the season as the Stallions' third-string quarterback, recording no stats throughout the season.

== Personal life ==
Smith's father, DeAndre, was the running backs coach for Texas Tech from 2019 to 2021. As of 2023, he is the running backs coach for the Indianapolis Colts in the NFL.
