= Tahj Brooks =

American football player (born 2002)

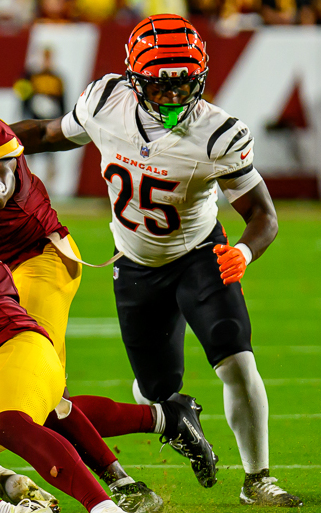
- Brooks with the Cincinnati Bengals in 2025

No. 25 – Cincinnati Bengals
- Position: Running back
- Roster status: Active

Personal information
- Born: May 13, 2002 (age 24); Manor, Texas, U.S.
- Listed height: 5 ft 9 in (1.75 m)
- Listed weight: 220 lb (100 kg)

Career information
- High school: Manor
- College: Texas Tech (2020–2024)
- NFL draft: 2025: 6th round, 193rd overall pick

Career history
- Cincinnati Bengals (2025–present)

Awards and highlights
- First-team All-Big 12 (2023); Second-team All-Big 12 (2024)

Career NFL statistics as of 2025
- Rushing yards: 45
- Rushing average: 2.8
- Receptions: 1
- Receiving yards: 9
- Return yards: 258
- Stats at Pro Football Reference

Tahj Brooks (born May 13, 2002) is an American professional football running back for the Cincinnati Bengals of the National Football League (NFL). He played college football for the Texas Tech Red Raiders and was selected by the Bengals in the sixth round of the 2025 NFL draft.

== Early life ==
Brooks attended Manor High School in Manor, Texas. During his career, he rushed for over 4,400 yards and had 47 total touchdowns. He committed to Texas Tech University to play college football.

== College career ==
As a true freshman at Texas Tech in 2020, he rushed for 255 yards on 69 carries with four touchdowns over 10 games. As a sophomore in 2021, he started four of nine games and led the team with 568 yards on 87 carries with seven touchdowns. He again finished as the team's leading rusher in 2022, finishing with 691 yards on 147 carries and seven touchdowns over 13 games and six starts.

Brooks returned as the starter his senior year in 2023. In the first half of the 2023 season, Brooks finished with 100-yards rushing in four consecutive games, becoming the first Texas Tech running back to do so in the 21st century. Brooks had his sixth 100-yard rushing game of the season against TCU, becoming the first Texas Tech running back to eclipse 1,000 yards in a single season since DeAndré Washington in 2015. Brooks was named a semifinalist for the 2023 Doak Walker Award.

On December 11, 2023, Brooks announced that he would be returning for the 2024 season. Against Iowa State, Brooks became the Red Raiders' all-time leader in rush attempts; the following game, against Colorado, Brooks surpassed Byron Hanspard as the program leader in rushing yards.

=== Statistics ===
Year	Team	GP	Rushing				Receiving			
Year	Team	GP	Att	Yds	Avg	TD	Rec	Yds	Avg	TD
2020	Texas Tech	10	69	255	3.7	4	13	61	4.7	0
2021	Texas Tech	9	87	568	6.5	7	6	52	8.7	0
2022	Texas Tech	13	147	691	4.7	7	27	164	6.1	1
2023	Texas Tech	13	290	1,541	5.3	10	29	72	3.4	0
2024	Texas Tech	11	286	1,505	5.3	17	28	199	7.1	1
Career		56	879	4,560	5.2	45	81.4	548	5.4	2

== Professional career ==
Pre-draft measurables
Height	Weight	Arm length	Hand span	Wingspan	40-yard dash	10-yard split	20-yard split	20-yard shuttle	Three-cone drill	Vertical jump	Broad jump	Bench press
5 ft 9 1/4 in (1.76 m)	214 lb (97 kg)	30 3/8 in (0.77 m)	9 1/8 in (0.23 m)	6 ft 3 5/8 in (1.92 m)	4.52 s	1.56 s	2.63 s	4.06 s	6.90 s	35.0 in (0.89 m)	10 ft 0 in (3.05 m)	16 reps
All values from NFL Combine

Brooks was selected by the Cincinnati Bengals as the 193rd pick in the sixth round of the 2025 NFL draft.
