= Myles Price =

American football player (born 2001)

No. 4 – Minnesota Vikings
- Positions: Wide receiver, Return specialist
- Roster status: Active

Personal information
- Born: December 16, 2001 (age 24)
- Listed height: 5 ft 9 in (1.75 m)
- Listed weight: 183 lb (83 kg)

Career information
- High school: The Colony (The Colony, Texas)
- College: Texas Tech (2020–2023); Indiana (2024)
- NFL draft: 2025: undrafted

Career history
- Minnesota Vikings (2025–present)

Career NFL statistics as of Week 10, 2026
- Receptions: 10
- Receiving yards: 81
- Receiving touchdowns: 1
- Return yards: 2,857
- Return touchdowns: 1
- Stats at Pro Football Reference

Myles Price (born December 16, 2001) is an American professional football wide receiver and return specialist for the Minnesota Vikings of the National Football League (NFL). He played college football for the Texas Tech Red Raiders and Indiana Hoosiers and he was signed as an undrafted free agent by the Vikings in 2025.

== Early life ==
Price attended high school at The Colony located in The Colony, Texas. Coming out of high school, he was rated as a three-star recruit, where he committed to play college football for the Texas Tech Red Raiders.

== College career ==
=== Texas Tech ===
During his four-year career at Texas Tech from 2020 through 2023, he appeared in 42 games with 25 starts, where he totaled 61 receptions for 1,751 yards and ten touchdowns, while also adding 207 yards and two touchdowns on the ground, and 350 return yards. After the conclusion of the 2023 season, Price decided to enter his name into the NCAA transfer portal.

=== Indiana ===
Price transferred to play for the Indiana Hoosiers. During his lone season at Indiana in 2024, he notched 38 receptions for 466 yards, 63 rushing yards, 289 return yards, and four total touchdowns.

== Professional career ==
Pre-draft measurables
Height	Weight	Arm length	Hand span	Wingspan	40-yard dash	10-yard split	20-yard split	20-yard shuttle	Three-cone drill	Vertical jump	Broad jump	Bench press
5 ft 8 1/2 in (1.74 m)	178 lb (81 kg)	30 in (0.76 m)	9 5/8 in (0.24 m)	6 ft 0 7/8 in (1.85 m)	4.41 s	1.56 s	2.55 s	4.39 s	7.07 s	36.0 in (0.91 m)	10 ft 3 in (3.12 m)	7 reps
All values from Pro Day

=== Minnesota Vikings ===
After not being selected in the 2025 NFL draft, Price signed with the Minnesota Vikings as an undrafted free agent. He made the initial 53-man roster on August 26, 2025. Price was one of the seven undrafted free agents that made the Vikings' roster. During his rookie season, Price was mainly utilized on punt and kickoff returns.

In Week 3 of the 2026 NFL season against the Tampa Bay Buccaneers, Price scored a touchdown on a 86-yard punt return and averaged 26.5 yards on his four punt returns and added five kick returns for 132 yards total, earning him NFC Special Teams Player of the Week. In addition, he was also named NFC Special Teams Player of the Month for September. In week 10 against the Green Bay Packers, he caught his first career touchdown on a 38-yard pass from Kirk Cousins. Price finished the game with four receptions for 49 yards in the 30–10 win.

== Career statistics ==
=== Regular season ===
Year	Team	Games		Receiving					Rushing					Kick returns					Punt returns					Fumbles	
Year	Team	GP	GS	Rec	Yds	Avg	Lng	TD	Att	Yds	Avg	Lng	TD	Ret	Yds	Avg	Lng	TD	Ret	Yds	Avg	Lng	TD	Fum	Lost
2025	MIN	16	0	—	—	—	—	—	—	—	—	—	—	57	1,479	25.9	61	0	30	298	9.9	43	0	4	3
2026	MIN	9	1	10	81	8.1	38	1	2	14	7.0	12	0	28	818	29.2	68	0	15	262	17.5	86	1	0	0
Career		25	1	10	81	8.1	38	1	2	14	7.0	12	0	85	2,297	27.0	68	0	45	560	12.4	86	1	4	3
