= 2018 Texas Tech Red Raiders football team =

American college football season

2018 Texas Tech Red Raiders football
- Conference: Big 12 Conference
- Record: 5–7 (3–6 Big 12)
- Head coach: Kliff Kingsbury (6th season)
- Offensive coordinator: Kevin Johns (1st season)
- Co-offensive coordinator: Clay McGuire (1st season)
- Offensive scheme: Air raid
- Defensive coordinator: David Gibbs (4th season)
- Co-defensive coordinator: Zac Spavital (3rd season)
- Base defense: Multiple
- Captains: Dakota Allen; Travis Bruffy; Ja'Deion High; Jah'Shawn Johnson; Terence Steele; Broderick Washington Jr.
- Home stadium: Jones AT&T Stadium

2018 Big 12 Conference football standings
	Conf.			Overall
Team	W		L	W		L
No. 4 Oklahoma y$^	8	–	1	12	–	2
No. 9 Texas y	7	–	2	10	–	4
Iowa State	6	–	3	8	–	5
No. 20 West Virginia	6	–	3	8	–	4
TCU	4	–	5	7	–	6
Baylor	4	–	5	7	–	6
Oklahoma State	3	–	6	7	–	6
Kansas State	3	–	6	5	–	7
Texas Tech	3	–	6	5	–	7
Kansas	1	–	8	3	–	9
Championship: Oklahoma 39, Texas 27
^ – College Football Playoff participant; $ – Conference champion; y – Championship game participant; Rankings from AP Poll

The 2018 Texas Tech Red Raiders football team represented Texas Tech University in the 2018 NCAA Division I FBS football season. They were led by Kliff Kingsbury in his sixth and final season as the program's 15th head coach. The Red Raiders played their home games on the university's campus in Lubbock, Texas at Jones AT&T Stadium, and competed as members of the Big 12 Conference. They finished the season 5–7 overall, 3–6 in Big 12 play to finish in a 3-way tie for seventh place.

On November 25, head coach Kliff Kingsbury was fired after 6 seasons as head coach, finishing 35–40 overall. 4 days later, the school hired Utah State head coach Matt Wells for the head coaching job.

== Coaching changes ==
Former offensive coordinator/receivers coach Eric Morris was hired as the head coach of the Incarnate Word Cardinals on December 30, 2017. Western Michigan Broncos offensive coordinator/quarterbacks coach Kevin Johns was hired as Texas Tech's new offensive coordinator/receivers coach on January 30, 2018.

== Preseason ==
=== Award watch lists ===
Listed in the order that they were released

Award	Player	Position	Year
Rimington Trophy	Paul Stawarz	C	SR
Chuck Bednarik Award	Dakota Allen	LB	SR
Doak Walker Award	DaLeon Ward	RB	SO
Jim Thorpe Award	Jah'Shawn Johnson	DB	SR
Bronko Nagurski Trophy	Dakota Allen	LB	SR
Earl Campbell Tyler Rose Award	T. J. Vasher	WR	JR

=== Big 12 media poll ===
The Big 12 media poll was released on July 12, 2018, with the Red Raiders predicted to finish in eighth place.

Media poll
Predicted finish	Team	Votes (1st place)
1	Oklahoma	509 (46)
2	West Virginia	432 (2)
3	TCU	390 (1)
4	Texas	370 (1)
5	Oklahoma State	300
6	Kansas State	283 (2)
7	Iowa State	250
8	Texas Tech	149
9	Baylor	125
10	Kansas	52

== Schedule ==
Texas Tech announced its 2018 schedule on October 27, 2017. The 2018 schedule will consist of six home games, four away games, and two neutral site games. The Red Raiders began the 2018 season on September 1 against the Ole Miss Rebels (from the SEC) at NRG Stadium in Houston for the AdvoCare Texas Kickoff and ended the season on November 24 against the Baylor Bears at AT&T Stadium in Arlington. The Red Raiders hosted Big 12 foes West Virginia, Kansas, Oklahoma, and Texas and traveled to Oklahoma State, TCU, Iowa State, and Kansas State.

The Red Raiders hosted non-conference foes Houston from the AAC and Lamar from the Southland Conference.

Date	Time	Opponent	Rank	Site	TV	Result	Attendance
September 1	11:00 a.m.	vs. Ole Miss*		NRG Stadium; Houston, TX (Texas Kickoff)	ESPN	L 27–47	40,333
September 8	3:00 p.m.	Lamar*		Jones AT&T Stadium; Lubbock, TX	FSN	W 77–0	52,126
September 15	3:15 p.m.	Houston*		Jones AT&T Stadium; Lubbock, TX (rivalry)	FOX	W 63–49	53,484
September 22	6:00 p.m.	at No. 15 Oklahoma State		Boone Pickens Stadium; Stillwater, OK	FS1	W 41–17	53,166
September 29	11:00 a.m.	No. 12 West Virginia	No. 25	Jones AT&T Stadium; Lubbock, TX	ESPN2	L 34–42	55,283
October 11	6:30 p.m.	at TCU		Amon G. Carter Stadium; Fort Worth, TX (rivalry)	ESPN	W 17–14	44,387
October 20	2:30 p.m.	Kansas^{†}		Jones AT&T Stadium; Lubbock, TX	FS1	W 48–16	54,402
October 27	11:00 a.m.	at Iowa State		Jack Trice Stadium; Ames, IA	ESPN2	L 31–40	57,908
November 3	7:00 p.m.	No. 7 Oklahoma		Jones AT&T Stadium; Lubbock, TX	ABC	L 46–51	60,454
November 10	6:30 p.m.	No. 15 Texas		Jones AT&T Stadium; Lubbock, TX (rivalry)	FOX	L 34–41	60,454
November 17	2:30 p.m.	at Kansas State		Bill Snyder Family Stadium; Manhattan, KS	ESPNU	L 6–21	47,287
November 24	11:00 a.m.	vs. Baylor		AT&T Stadium; Arlington, TX (rivalry)	FS1	L 24–35	27,308
*Non-conference game; ^{†}Homecoming; Rankings from AP Poll released prior to the game; All times are in Central time

Schedule source:

== Personnel ==
=== Roster ===
2018 Texas Tech Red Raiders Football
Quarterback: 6 McLane Carter – junior (6'3, 225); 7 Jett Duffey – sophomore (6'1, 200); 10 Alan Bowman – freshman (6'3, 201); 12 Colt Garrett – sophomore (6'1, 195); 15 Nick Gerber – sophomore (6'1, 175); 16 Caleb Griffin – junior (6'3, 240); Running back: 2 Demarcus Felton – senior (5'10, 205); 21 Da'Leon Ward – sophomore (5'10, 180); 24 Tre King – senior (5'11, 190); 26 Ta'Zhawn Henry – freshman (5'7, 170); 28 SaRodorick Thompson – freshman (6'0, 200); 36 Jake Levrier – (redshirt) freshman (5'8, 185); Fullback: 29 Mason Reed – senior (6'2, 225); 40 Connor Killian – sophomore (6'2, 235); 41 Tyler Carr – sophomore (6'4, 260); Wide receiver: 3 Xavier Martin – (redshirt) freshman (6'0, 185); 4 Antoine Wesley – junior (6'5, 200); 8 De'Quan Bowman – senior (5'11, 190); 9 T. J. Vasher – sophomore (6'6, 190); 19 Zach Austin – senior (5'11, 195); 22 Seth Collins – junior (6'3, 190); 32 Kevin Terry – freshman (6,1, 185); 80 Brandt Schilling – sophomore (5,9, 175); 82 Kesean Carter – freshman (5,11, 165); 83 Myller Royals – freshman (6'5, 180); 84 Erik Ezukanma – freshman (6'3, 180); 85 Corey Fulcher – freshman (6'1, 185); 86 Dalton Rigdon – (redshirt) freshman (5'11, 170); 87 Sterling Galban – freshman (5'11, 170); 88 Ja'Deion High – senior (5'11, 190); 89 Caden Leggett – freshman (6'1, 185); Tight end: 11 Donta Thompson – junior (6'5, 225); 47 Mason McHorse – freshman (6'4, 230); Long snapper: 43 Noah Hess – junior (6'2, 200); 48 Kyle Heffron – senior (6'0, 215); 50 Landon O'Connor – (redshirt) freshman (6'2, 185)	Offensive lineman: 56 Jack Anderson – RG – sophomore (6'5, 320); 58 Madison Akamnonu – LT – junior (6'5, 320); 59 Demarcus Marshall – OG – freshman (6'3, 280); 61 Colin Yang – OL – senior (6'3, 280); 64 Clayton Franks – OG – freshman (6'4, 275); 65 Zach Adams – OT – sophomore (6'6, 320); 66 Hakeem White – OG – freshman (6'3, 285); 67 Troy Bradshaw – OL – freshman (6,6, 275); 68 Casey Verhulst – OT – (redshirt) freshman (6'6, 305); 70 Weston Wright – OT – freshman (6'6, 300); 71 Bailey Smith – RT – junior (6'5, 305); 72 Jack Reichel – OG – senior (6'5, 290); 73 Dawson Deaton – C – (redshirt) freshman (6'6, 305); 74 Will Farrar – OL – (redshirt) freshman (6'5, 320); 75 Giovanni Pancotti – OT – sophomore (6'6, 310); 76 Paul Stawarz – C – senior (6'6, 295); 77 Jacob Hines – OG – senior (6'5, 320); 78 Terence Steele – RT – junior (6'6, 320); 79 Travis Bruffy – LT – junior (6'6, 305); Defensive lineman: 50 Mark Brown – (redshirt) (6'3, 225); 53 Eli Howard – sophomore (6'4, 270); 57 Michael Mays – senior (6'1, 230); 59 Zackery Semrak – (redshirt) freshman (6'2, 290); 66 John Gerold – junior (6'4, 285); 89 Houston Miller – sophomore (6'4, 265); 90 Quentin Yontz – senior (6'2, 270); 91 Nelson Mbanasor – (redshirt) freshman (6'3, 280); 92 Noah Jones – sophomore (6'3, 260); 93 John Scott III – freshman (6'3, 275); 94 Lonzell Gilmore – junior (6'3, 280); 95 Jaylon Hutchings – freshman (6'0, 295); 96 Broderick Washington Jr. – junior (6'3, 305); 97 Joseph Wallace – sophomore (6'1, 315); 98 Nick McCann – sophomore (6'2, 310); 99 Preston Gordon – senior (6'1, 280)	Linebacker: 1 Jordyn Brooks – junior (6'1, 240); 6 Riko Jeffers – sophomore (6'2, 245); 9 Tony Jones – senior (6'2, 225); 13 Kolin Hill – senior (6'2, 245); 18 Christian Taylor – junior (6'2, 220); 34 Taven Christopher – sophomore (6'2, 185); 35 Patrick Curley – freshman (6'2, 215); 37 Xavier Benson – freshman (6'3, 200); 38 Jacob Schuster – (redshirt) freshman (5'11, 210); 39 Michael Nelson – (redshirt) freshman (5'11, 205); 40 Dakota Allen – senior (6'1, 235); 42 Case Gatlin – freshman (6'4, 230); 45 Aaron Calcote – (redshirt) freshman (6'0, 230); 52 Ja'Quay Pough – sophomore (6'1, 220); Defensive back: 3 Douglas Coleman – junior (6'1, 190); 4 Desmon Smith – junior (6'2, 190); 5 Octavius Morgan – senior (6'0, 205); 7 Jah'Shawn Johnson – senior (5'10, 185); 10 John Bonney – senior (6'1, 205); 12 Quincy Addison – (redshirt) freshman (6'1, 190); 15 Vaughnte Dorsey – senior (5'11, 200); 16 Thomas Leggett – sophomore (6'0, 185); 17 John Davis Jr. – (redshirt) freshman (6'1, 185); 20 Adrian Frye – (redshirt) freshman (6'1, 190); 21 Kisean Allen – senior (5'11, 180); 22 Trey Gentry – sophomore (5'11, 175); 23 DaMarcus Fields – sophomore (6'0, 200); 24 Adam Beck – (redshirt) freshman (6'2, 185); 27 Adrien Cross – junior (5'10, 195); 30 Jax Welch – sophomore (5'9, 180); 31 Justus Parker – junior (6'0, 205); 32 Jake Kirkpatrick – freshman (5'11, 190); 34 Lamont Jones Jr. – (redshirt) freshman (6'0, 185); 41 Andre Woods – senior (5'10, 175); 48 Adonis Brown – freshman (6'0, 175); Placekicker: 36 Trey Wolff – freshman (6'4, 185); 39 Matthew Cluck – senior (6'0, 210); 49 Michael Barden – senior (5'11, 180); 96 Clayton Hatfield – senior (5'10, 185); Punter: 46 Reed Bowman – sophomore (6'0, 205); 85 Dominic Panazzolo – senior (6'5, 210)

=== Coaching staff ===
Texas Tech Red Raiders
Name	Position	Consecutive season at Texas Tech in current position	Previous position
Kliff Kingsbury	Head coach	6th	Texas A&M offensive coordinator and quarterbacks coach (2012)
David Gibbs	Defensive coordinator	4th	Houston interim head coach and defensive coordinator (2014)
Kevin Johns	Offensive coordinator and wide receivers coach	1st	Western Michigan offensive coordinator and quarterbacks coach (2017)
Brett Dewhurst	Safeties coach	1st	Southeastern Louisiana defensive backs coach (2017)
Terrance Jamison	Defensive line coach	2nd	Florida Atlantic defensive line coach (2014–2016)
Clay Jennings	Defensive backs coach	1st	Houston co-defensive coordinator and secondary coach (2017)
Brandon Jones	Offensive line coach	2nd	California offensive line coach (2015–2016)
Emmett Jones	Outside receivers coach	3rd	Texas Tech director of player development (2015)
Clay McGuire	Co-offensive coordinator and running backs coach	1st	Washington State offensive line coach (2012–2017)
Adam Scheier	Special teams coordinator	1st	Ohio State kicking coach (2017)
Zac Spavital	Co-defensive coordinator and linebackers coach	3rd	Texas Tech linebackers coach (2015)
Rusty Whitt	Head strength and conditioning coach	3rd	Louisiana strength and conditioning coach (2015)

== Game summaries ==
=== Vs. Ole Miss ===
Ole Miss Rebels vs. Texas Tech Red Raiders (AdvoCare Texas Kickoff) – Game summary

Quarter	1	2	3	4	Total
Rebels	24	6	7	10	47
Red Raiders	7	10	10	0	27

at NRG Stadium, Houston, TX

- Date: September 1
- Game time: 11:00 a.m.
- Game weather: Played indoors (retractable roof closed)
- Game attendance: 40,333
- Referee: Jeremy Magallanes
- TV announcers (ESPN): Mark Jones (play-by-play), Dusty Dvoracek (color), Molly McGrath (reporter)

Game information

First quarter

- MISS – DK Metcalf 58-yard pass from Jordan Ta'amu (Luke Logan kick), 14:27. Rebels 7–0. Drive: 2 plays, 69 yards, 0:33.
- TTU – Da'Leon Ward 15-yard run (Clayton Hatfield kick), 10:32. Tied 7–7. Drive: 10 plays, 90 yards, 3:55.
- MISS – Jaylon Jones 94-yard kick return, 10:17. Rebels 14–7.
- MISS – Luke Logan 24-yard field goal, 4:30. Rebels 17–7. Drive: 14 plays, 65 yards, 4:42.
- MISS – Scottie Phillips 39-yard run, 1:08. Rebels 24–7. Drive: 5 plays, 60 yards, 1:49.

Second quarter

- TTU – Clayton Hatfield 25-yard field goal, 12:17. Rebels 24–10. Drive: 9 plays, 42 yards, 3:51.
- MISS – Luke Logan 29-yard field goal, 6:41. Rebels 27–10. Drive: 8 plays, 53 yards, 3:35.
- TTU – Ja'Deion White 14-yard pass from Alan Bowman, 1:57. Rebels 27–17. Drive: 11 plays, 75 yards, 4:44.
- MISS – Luke Logan 39-yard field goal, 0:37. Rebels 30–17. Drive: 8 plays, 47 yards, 1:20.

Third quarter

- TTU – Clayton Hatfield 41-yard field goal, 7:57. Rebels 30–20. Drive: 11 plays, 65 yards, 3:50.
- MISS – Scottie Phillips 65-yard run (Luke Logan kick), 7:07. Rebels 37–20. Drive: 3 plays, 75 yards, 0:50.
- TTU – Da'Leon Ward 9-yard run (Clayton Hatfield kick), 5:30. Rebels 37–27. Drive: 5 plays, 75 yards, 1:37.

Fourth quarter

- MISS – A. J. Brown 34-yard pass from Jordan Ta'amu (Luke Logan kick), 14:33. Rebels 44–27. Drive: 2 plays, 54 yards, 0:20.
- MISS – Luke Logan 23-yard field goal, 4:09. Rebels 47–27. Drive: 8 plays, 80 yards, 5:02.

Top passers

- MISS – Jordan Ta'amu – 22/32, 336 yards, 2 TD
- TTU – Alan Bowman – 29/49, 273 yards, TD

Top rushers

- MISS – Scottie Phillips – 16 carries, 204 yards, 2 TD
- TTU – Da'Leon Ward – 17 carries 90 yards, 2 TD

Top receivers

- MISS – DaMarkus Lodge – 6 receptions, 96 yards
- TTU – T. J. Vasher – 4 receptions, 66 yards

Statistics	Ole Miss	Texas Tech
Total yards	546	486
Passing yards	336	322
Rushing yards	210	164
Penalties	7-49	6-80
Turnovers	1	0
Time of Possession	23:35	36:25

McLane Carter was named the Red Raiders' starting quarterback for the game. Carter exited the game in the 1st quarter with an ankle injury, with freshman Alan Bowman replacing him. Texas Tech lost its first season opener since the 2002 season, losing to Ole Miss by a score of 27–47.

=== Lamar ===
Lamar Cardinals at Texas Tech Red Raiders – Game summary

Quarter	1	2	3	4	Total
Cardinals	0	0	0	0	0
Red Raiders	14	28	14	21	77

at Jones AT&T Stadium, Lubbock, TX

- Date: September 8
- Game time: 3:00 p.m.
- Game weather: Temperature: 77 °F (25 °C) • Weather: cloudy • Wind: NNE 10 MPH
- Game attendance: 52,126
- Referee: Eddy Shelton
- TV: FSN

Game information

First quarter

- TTU – Ja'Deion High 11-yard pass from Alan Bowman (Clayton Hatfield kick), 10:22. Red Raiders 7–0. Drive: 8 plays, 51 yards, 2:44.
- TTU – Demarcus Felton 6-yard run (Clayton Hatfield kick), 4:42. Red Raiders 14–0. Drive: 1 play, 6 yards, 0:05.

Second quarter

- TTU – SaRodorick Thompson 8-yard run (Clayton Hatfield kick), 12:07. Red Raiders 21–0. Drive: 12 plays, 80 yards, 4:00.
- TTU – Ta'Zhawn Henry 2-yard run (Clayton Hatfield kick), 4:48. Red Raiders 28–0. Drive: 10 plays, 87 yards, 3:53.
- TTU – Antoine Wesley 66-yard pass from Alan Bowman (Clayton Hatfield kick), 2:17. Red Raiders 35–0. Drive: 2 plays, 71 yards, 0:34.
- TTU – Demarcus Felton 1-yard run (Clayton Hatfield kick), 0:17. Red Raiders 42–0. Drive: 8 plays, 38 yards, 1:32.

Third quarter

- TTU – Jett Duffey 11-yard run (Clayton Hatfield kick), 4:43. Red Raiders 49–0. Drive: 8 plays, 63 yards, 2:04.
- TTU – Ta'Zhawn Henry 1-yard run (Clayton Hatfield kick), 0:53. Red Raiders 56–0. Drive: 8 plays, 58 yards, 2:41.

Fourth quarter

- TTU – SaRodorick Thompson 21-yard run (Clayton Hatfield kick), 12:30. Red Raiders 63–0. Drive: 4 plays, 50 yards, 1:03.
- TTU – Adrian Frye 48-yard interception return (Clayton Hatfield kick), 10:43. Red Raiders 70–0.
- TTU – Erik Ezukanma 44-yard pass from Colt Garrett (Clayton Hatfield kick), 8:47. Red Raiders 77–0. Drive: 4 plays, 31 yards, 1:49.

Top passers

- LAM – Darrell Colbert, Jr. – 9/26, 72 yards, INT
- TTU – Alan Bowman – 22/25, 282 yards, 2 TD

Top rushers

- LAM – Jordan Hoy – 4 carries, 24 yards
- TTU – Jett Duffey – 6 carries, 81 yards, TD

Top receivers

- LAM – Myles Wanza – 2 receptions, 23 yards
- TTU – Antoine Wesley – 4 receptions, 87 yards, TD

Statistics	Lamar	Texas Tech
Total yards	182	683
Passing yards	80	419
Rushing yards	102	264
Penalties	4-15	14-139
Turnovers	4	1
Time of Possession	29:20	30:40

Texas Tech defeated Lamar by a score of 77–0, the Red Raiders' first shutout victory since September 2006. The 77 points are the most points scored by Texas Tech since an 80–21 victory over Sam Houston State in September 2005 and the largest margin of victory since a 79–0 win over Trinity in November 1932.

=== Houston ===
Houston Cougars at Texas Tech Red Raiders (Celebrate Cotton Game) – Game summary

Quarter	1	2	3	4	Total
Cougars	21	7	14	7	49
Red Raiders	14	21	14	14	63

at Jones AT&T Stadium, Lubbock, TX

- Date: September 15
- Game time: 3:15 p.m.
- Game weather: Temperature: 80 °F (27 °C) • Weather: cloudy • Wind: ESE 13 MPH
- Game attendance: 53,484
- Referee: Adam Savoie
- TV: FOX

Game information

First quarter

- TTU – Ta'Zhawn Henry 3-yard run (Clayton Hatfield kick), 12:58. Red Raiders 7–0. Drive: 6 plays, 75 yards, 2:02.
- HOU – Raelon Singleton 18-yard pass from D'Eriq King (Dalton Witherspoon kick), 11:14. Tied 7–7. Drive: 8 plays, 75 yards, 1:44.
- HOU – Marquez Stevenson 57-yard pass from D'Eriq King (Dalton Witherspoon kick), 5:38. Cougars 14–7. Drive: 4 plays, 84 yards, 1:06.
- TTU – Antoine Wesley 58-yard pass from Alan Bowman (Clayton Hatfield kick), 1:05. Tied 14–14. Drive: 2 plays, 59 yards, 0:38.
- HOU – Marquez Stevenson 79-yard pass from D'Eriq King (Dalton Witherspoon kick), 0:33. Cougars 21–14. Drive: 2 plays, 75 yards, 0:32.

Second quarter

- TTU – T. J. Vasher 6-yard pass from Alan Bowman (Clayton Hatfield kick), 9:13. Tied 21–21. Drive: 6 plays, 57 yards, 1:55.
- HOU – Keith Corbin 18-yard pass from D'Eriq King (Dalton Witherspoon kick), 7:28. Cougars 28–21. Drive: 1 play, 18 yards, 0:05.
- TTU – Antoine Wesley 6-yard pass from Alan Bowman (Clayton Hatfield kick), 3:07. Tied 28–28. Drive: 12 plays, 75 yards, 4:21.
- TTU – T. J. Vasher 1-yard pass from Alan Bowman (Clayton Hatfield kick), 0:03. Red Raiders 35–28. Drive: 8 plays, 57 yards, 1:50.

Third quarter

- HOU – Terrence Williams 31-yard run (Dalton Witherspoon kick), 13:03. Tied 35–35. Drive: 6 plays, 75 yards, 1:57.
- TTU – Ta'Zhawn Henry 19-yard run (Clayton Hatfield kick), 10:49. Red Raiders 42–35. Drive: 8 plays, 87 yards, 2:14.
- TTU – Ta'Zhawn Henry 13-yard run (Clayton Hatfield kick), 7:46. Red Raiders 49–35. Drive: 5 plays, 80 yards, 1:19.
- HOU – Keith Corbin 9-yard pass from D'Eriq King (Dalton Witherspoon kick), 1:47. Red Raiders 49–42. Drive: 8 plays, 60 yards, 1:56.

Fourth quarter

- TTU – Ta'Zhawn Henry 1-yard run (Clayton Hatfield kick), 10:19. Red Raiders 56–42. Drive: 16 plays, 82 yards, 6:28.
- TTU – Antoine Wesley 33-yard pass from Alan Bowman (Clayton Hatfield kick), 3:49. Red Raiders 63–42. Drive: 5 plays, 44 yards, 2:06.
- HOU – D'Eriq King 5-yard run (Dalton Witherspoon kick), 1:07. Red Raiders 63–49. Drive: 10 plays, 65 yards, 2:42.

Top passers

- HOU – D'Eriq King – 30/51, 431 yards, 5 TD
- TTU – Alan Bowman – 43/59, 605 yards, 5 TD

Top rushers

- HOU – Terrence Williams – 6 carries, 61 yards, TD
- TTU – Ta'Zhawn Henry – 24 carries, 111 yards, 4 TD

Top receivers

- HOU – Marquez Stevenson – 9 receptions, 177 yards, 2 TD
- TTU – Antoine Wesley – 13 receptions, 261 yards, 3 TD

Statistics	Houston	Texas Tech
Total yards	635	704
Passing yards	462	605
Rushing yards	173	99
Penalties	9-68	9-82
Turnovers	0	1
Time of Possession	24:22	35:38

Receiver Antoine Wesley broke a school record for most receiving yards in a game with 261 yards. Quarterback Alan Bowman broke a Big 12 record for most passing yards in a game by a freshman with 605 yards.

=== At Oklahoma State ===
Texas Tech Red Raiders at No. 15 Oklahoma State Cowboys – Game summary

Quarter	1	2	3	4	Total
Red Raiders	7	17	10	7	41
No. 15 Cowboys	10	7	0	0	17

at Boone Pickens Stadium, Stillwater, OK

- Date: September 22
- Game time: 6:00 p.m.
- Game weather: Temperature: 77 °F (25 °C) • Weather: sunny • Wind: NE 9 MPH
- Game attendance: 53,166
- Referee: Mike Defee
- TV: FS1

Game information

First quarter

- OKST – J.D. King 23-yard pass from Taylor Cornelius (Matt Ammendola kick), 7:35. Cowboys 7–0. Drive: 8 plays, 99 yards, 1:47.
- TTU – T. J Vasher 12-yard pass from Alan Bowman (Clayton Hatfield kick), 4:50. Tied 7–7. Drive: 8 plays, 75 yards, 2:45.
- OKST – Matt Ammendola 39-yard field goal, 2:00. Cowboys 10–7. Drive: 9 plays, 52 yards, 2:50.

Second quarter

- TTU – KeSean Carter 2-yard pass from Alan Bowman (Clayton Hatfield kick), 14:56. Red Raiders 14–10. Drive: 6 plays, 75 yards, 2:04.
- OKST – Justice Hill 13-yard run (Matt Ammendola kick), 10:40. Cowboys 17–14. Drive: 5 plays, 53 yards, 0:47.
- TTU – SaRodorick Thompson 1-yard run (Clayton Hatfield kick), 7:15. Red Raiders 21–17. Drive: 8 plays, 75 yards, 3:25.
- TTU – Clayton Hatfield 31-yard field goal, 1:40. Red Raiders 24–17. Drive: 11 plays, 63 yards, 4:24.

Third quarter

- TTU – Demarcus Felton 27-yard run (Clayton Hatfield kick), 8:57. Red Raiders 31–17. Drive: 7 plays, 62 yards, 1:54.
- TTU – Clayton Hatfield 32-yard field goal, 1:25. Red Raiders 34–17. Drive: 7 plays, 27 yards, 3:26.

Fourth quarter

- TTU – Demarcus Felton 17-yard run (Clayton Hatfield kick), 4:29. Red Raiders 41–17. Drive: 10 plays, 72 yards, 6:01.

Top passers

- TTU – Alan Bowman – 35/46, 397 yards, 2 TD, 2 INT
- OKST – Taylor Cornelius – 18/38, 258 yards, TD, INT

Top rushers

- TTU – Demarcus Felton – 12 carries, 121 yards, 2 TD
- OKST – Justice Hill – 12 carries, 111 yards, TD

Top receivers

- TTU – Antoine Wesley – 7 receptions, 98 yards
- OKST – Tylan Wallace – 7 receptions, 123 yards

Statistics	Texas Tech	Oklahoma State
Total yards	621	386
Passing yards	397	258
Rushing yards	224	128
Penalties	3-20	8-73
Turnovers	2	2
Time of Possession	41:17	18:43

With the 41–17 victory, the Red Raiders got their first win in Stillwater since 2001, and their first win over the Cowboys since 2008. This is also Texas Tech's first win over a ranked opponent since the 2013 Holiday Bowl.

=== West Virginia ===
No. 12 West Virginia Mountaineers at No. 25 Texas Tech Red Raiders – Game summary

Quarter	1	2	3	4	Total
No. 12 Mountaineers	28	7	0	7	42
No. 25 Red Raiders	7	3	7	17	34

at Jones AT&T Stadium, Lubbock, TX

- Date: September 29
- Game time: 11:00 a.m.
- Game weather: Temperature: 61 °F (16 °C) • Weather: partly cloudy • Wind: S 5 MPH
- Game attendance: 55,283
- Referee: Brad VanVark
- TV announcers (ESPN2): Anish Shroff (play-by-play), Ahmad Brooks (color)

Game information

First quarter

- WVU – Gary Jennings Jr. 13-yard pass from Will Grier (Evan Staley kick), 12:21. Mountaineers 7–0. Drive: 7 plays, 75 yards, 2:39.
- WVU – Leddie Brown 1-yard run (Evan Staley kick), 8:06. Mountaineers 14–0. Drive: 6 plays, 39 yards, 2:07.
- WVU – Marcus Simms 45-yard pass from Will Grier (Evan Staley kick), 3:03. Mountaineers 21–0. Drive: 3 plays, 68 yards, 0:55.
- TTU – Antoine Wesley 40-yard pass from Alan Bowman (Clayton Hatfield kick), 2:06. Mountaineers 21–7. Drive: 4 plays, 65 yards, 0:57.
- WVU – Kennedy McKoy 38-yard run (Evan Staley kick), 0:04. Mountaineers 28–7. Drive: 6 plays, 75 yards, 2:02.

Second quarter

- TTU – Clayton Hatfield 25-yard field goal, 9:38. Mountaineers 28–10. Drive: 14 plays, 76 yards, 5:26.
- WVU – Gary Jennings Jr. 14-yard pass from Will Grier (Evan Staley kick), 1:08. Mountaineers 35–10. Drive: 12 plays, 72 yards, 4:08.

Third quarter

- TTU – De'Quan Bowman 2-yard pass from Jett Duffey (Clayton Hatfield kick), 3:02. Mountaineers 35–17. Drive: 11 plays, 64 yards, 3:53.

Fourth quarter

- TTU – Clayton Hatfield 27-yard field goal, 12:31. Mountaineers 35–20. Drive: 12 plays, 71 yards, 3:06.
- TTU – Jett Duffey 3-yard run (Clayton Hatfield kick), 7:50. Mountaineers 35–27. Drive: 6 plays, 61 yards, 2:18.
- WVU – Keith Washington 51-yard interception return (Evan Staley kick), 2:58. Mountaineers 42–27.
- TTU – Ta'Zhawn Henry 1-yard run (Clayton Hatfield kick), 0:38. Mountaineers 42–34. Drive: 9 plays, 42 yards, 2:20.

Top passers

- WVU – Will Grier – 27/41, 370 yards, 3 TD
- TTU – Jett Duffey – 16/27, 172 yards, TD, 2 INT

Top rushers

- WVU – Kennedy McCoy – 11 carries, 77 yards, TD
- TTU – Jett Duffey – 15 carries, 86 yards, TD

Top receivers

- WVU – Marcus Simms – 9 receptions, 138 yards, TD
- TTU – Antoine Wesley – 8 receptions, 110 yards, TD

Statistics	West Virginia	Texas Tech
Total yards	489	463
Passing yards	370	295
Rushing yards	119	168
Penalties	12-115	7-60
Turnovers	0	3
Time of Possession	30:26	29:34

Starting quarterback Alan Bowman left the game late in the second quarter with an upper-body injury, with Jett Duffey finishing the game. Bowman finished the game 9/20 for 123 yards with one touchdown and an interception. Bowman was taken to a local hospital where it was revealed he had a partially collapsed lung.

=== At TCU ===
Texas Tech Red Raiders at TCU Horned Frogs – Game summary

Quarter	1	2	3	4	Total
Red Raiders	3	0	7	7	17
Horned Frogs	0	7	0	7	14

at Amon G. Carter Stadium, Fort Worth, TX

- Date: October 11
- Game time: 6:30 p.m.
- Game weather: Temperature: 72 °F (22 °C) • Weather: partly cloudy • Wind: ENE 8 MPH
- Game attendance: 44,387
- Referee: Scott Campbell
- TV announcers (ESPN): Dave Flemming, Joey Galloway, Kirk Herbstreit, Laura Rutledge

Game information

First quarter

- TTU – Clayton Hatfield 22-yard field goal, 6:14. Red Raiders 3–0. Drive: 13 plays, 53 yards, 6:03.

Second quarter

- TCU – Jalen Reagor 20-yard pass from Shawn Robinson (Jonathan Song kick), 12:14. Horned Frogs 7–3. Drive: 4 plays, 42 yards, 1:37.

Third quarter

- TTU – Ja'Deion High 62-yard pass from Jett Duffey (Clayton Hatfield kick), 8:54. Red Raiders 10–7. Drive: 6 plays, 86 yards, 2:09.

Fourth quarter

- TCU – KaVontae Turpin 31-yard pass from Shawn Robinson (Jonathan Song kick), 10:59. Horned Frogs 14–10. Drive: 8 plays, 80 yards, 3:17.
- TTU – Jett Duffey 38-yard run (Clayton Hatfield kick), 7:02. Red Raiders 17–14. Drive: 1 play, 38 yards, 0:09.

Top passers

- TTU – Jett Duffey – 13/24, 190 yards, TD, INT
- TCU – Shawn Robinson – 26/45, 290 yards, 2 TD, 2 INT

Top rushers

- TTU – Jett Duffey – 16 carries, 83 yards, TD
- TCU – Shawn Robinson – 7 carries, 42 yards

Top receivers

- TTU – Antoine Wesley – 3 receptions, 82 yards
- TCU – KaVontae Turpin – 6 receptions, 120 yards, TD

Statistics	Texas Tech	TCU
Total yards	353	411
Passing yards	202	290
Rushing yards	151	121
Penalties	12–89	8–63
Turnovers	1	3
Time of Possession	30:45	29:15

Jett Duffey started at quarterback for the Red Raiders, the third different starting quarterback in 2018 for Texas Tech.

The Horned Frogs received the opening kickoff, starting at their own 8-yard line following an illegal block penalty. TCU had two more penalties on the drive (both for a false start) and ended the drive with Andrew David punting from his own 22-yard line. Texas Tech made it to the TCU 5-yard line before the drive stalled, settling for a 22-yard field goal from Clayton Hatfield to take a 3–0 lead. On the next drive the Horned Frogs made it to the Texas Tech 8-yard line. The drive ended when a Shawn Robinson pass was intercepted in the endzone by Jordyn Brooks, who returned the interception to the Texas Tech 3-yard line. The Red Raiders only gained two yards following the interception, punting from their own 5-yard line. The Horned Frogs started their drive from the Texas Tech 40, ending the drive on a 20-yard touchdown pass from Shawn Robinson to Jalen Reagor. Texas Tech made it to the TCU 45-yard line, turning the ball over on downs. On the next drive, TCU went for it on 4th down and picked up the 1st down, but Sewo Olonilua fumbled the ball with it being recovered by Tony Jones for Texas Tech. The two teams traded punts on their next possessions. With less than a minute left in the half, a Duffey pass was intercepted by Julius Lewis at the Texas Tech 44-yard line. Following Duffey's interception, Jonathan Song attempted a 47-yard field goal for the Horned Frogs, with the kick going to the left of the goal posts. The Red Raiders took a knee to end the half.

McLane Carter came out at quarterback for Texas Tech to start the second half, playing in his first game since week 1 against Ole Miss. Carter was sacked twice on the first drive of the half, with the Red Raiders having to punt. Duffey returned to the game on Texas Tech's second drive of the half after Carter appeared to be limping off the field following the team's previous drive. Duffey's first drive of the second half ended with a 62-yard touchdown pass to Ja'Deion High. Duffey would also have a 38-yard touchdown run in the 4th quarter to help the Red Raiders edge out the Horned Frogs.

=== Kansas ===
Kansas Jayhawks at Texas Tech Red Raiders (Homecoming 2018) – Game summary

Quarter	1	2	3	4	Total
Jayhawks	3	0	6	7	16
Red Raiders	3	21	3	21	48

at Jones AT&T Stadium, Lubbock, TX

- Date: October 20
- Game time: 2:30 p.m.
- Game weather: Temperature: 66 °F (19 °C) • Weather: mostly clear • Wind: E 10 MPH
- Game attendance: 54,402
- Referee: Brandon Cruse
- TV: FS1

Game information

First quarter

- TTU – Clayton Hatfield 48-yard field goal, 10:32. Red Raiders 3–0. Drive: 14 plays, 45 yards, 4:28.
- KU – Davon Ferguson 20-yard field goal, 2:31. Tied 3–3. Drive: 4 plays, 6 yards, 1:28.

Second quarter

- TTU – Tre King 18-yard run (Clayton Hatfield kick), 14:52. Red Raiders 10–3. Drive: 8 plays, 75 yards, 2:39.
- TTU – T. J. Vasher 13-yard pass from Alan Bowman (Clayton Hatfield kick), 4:26. Red Raiders 17–3. Drive: 10 plays, 80 yards, 4:15.
- TTU – Ta'Zhawn Henry 4-yard run (Clayton Hatfield kick), 1:29. Red Raiders 24–3. Drive: 4 plays, 56 yards, 0:57.

Third quarter

- TTU – Clayton Hatfield 47-yard field goal, 8:47. Red Raiders 27–3. Drive: 12 plays, 42 yards, 4:47.
- KU – Steven Sims 30-yard pass from Peyton Bender (two-point conversion failed), 0:00. Red Raiders 27–9. Drive: 12 plays, 80 yards, 2:05.

Fourth quarter

- TTU – Antoine Wesley 6-yard pass from Alan Bowman (Clayton Hatfield kick), 13:29. Red Raiders 34–9. Drive: 4 plays, 54 yards, 1:31.
- TTU – Seth Collins 11-yard pass from Alan Bowman (Clayton Hatfield kick), 9:38. Red Raiders 41–9. Drive: 6 plays, 80 yards, 2:05.
- TTU – Demarcus Felton 34-yard run (Clayton Hatfield kick), 3:52. Red Raiders 48–9. Drive: 6 plays, 67 yards, 2:44.
- KU – Stephon Robinson 18-yard pass from Peyton Bender (Davon Ferguson kick), 0:11. Red Raiders 48–16. Drive: 7 plays, 88 yards, 3:41.

Top passers

- KU – Peyton Bender – 18/41, 221 yards, TD, INT
- TTU – Alan Bowman – 36/46, 408 yards, 3 TD, INT

Top rushers

- KU – Pooka Williams Jr. – 16 carries, 70 yards
- TTU – Ta'Zhawn Henry – 15 carries, 62 yards, TD

Top receivers

- KU – Daylon Charlot – 3 receptions, 59 yards
- TTU – Antoine Wesley – 9 receptions, 155 yards, TD

Statistics	Kansas	Texas Tech
Total yards	308	553
Passing yards	221	441
Rushing yards	87	112
Penalties	6-62	7-61
Turnovers	2	3
Time of Possession	28:27	31:33

Alan Bowman started his first game since suffering a partially collapsed lung three weeks earlier. Bowman left the game midway through the fourth quarter, finishing the game 36/46 for 408 yards and three touchdowns with an interception.

=== At Iowa State ===
Texas Tech Red Raiders at Iowa State Cyclones – Game summary

Quarter	1	2	3	4	Total
Red Raiders	10	7	7	7	31
Cyclones	0	14	17	9	40

at Jack Trice Stadium, Ames, IA

- Date: October 27
- Game time: 11:00 a.m.
- Game weather: Temperature: 50 °F (10 °C) • Weather: clear • Wind: SW 0-2 MPH
- Game attendance: 57,908
- Referee: Mike Defee
- TV announcers (ESPN2): Anish Shroff, Ahmad D. Brooks, Roddy Jones

Game information

First quarter

- TTU – Thomas Leggett 0-yard blocked punt return (Clayton Hatfield kick), 11:44. Red Raiders 7–0.
- TTU – Clayton Hatfield 27-yard field goal, 1:28. Red Raiders 10–0. Drive: 8 plays, 34 yards, 2:49.

Second quarter

- ISU – David Montgomery 1-yard run (Connor Assalley kick), 13:35. Red Raiders 10–7. Drive: 9 plays, 75 yards, 2:53.
- ISU – Charlie Kolar 9-yard pass from Brock Purdy (Connor Assalley kick), 4:35. Cyclones 14–10. Drive: 7 plays, 89 yards, 3:12.
- TTU – Alan Bowman 1-yard run (Clayton Hatfield kick), 0:10. Red Raiders 17–14. Drive: 12 plays, 85 yards, 4:25.

Third quarter

- ISU – Connor Assalley 27-yard field goal, 12:26. Tied 17–17. Drive: 6 plays, 33 yards, 2:34.
- ISU – Marcel Spears Jr. 41-yard interception return (Connor Assalley kick), 11:03. Cyclones 24–17.
- TTU – Antoine Wesley 31-yard pass from Alan Bowman (Clayton Hatfield kick), 8:21. Tied 24–24. Drive: 8 plays, 65 yards, 2:42.
- ISU – David Montgomery 1-yard run (Connor Assalley kick), 4:41. Cyclones 31–24. Drive: 7 plays, 75 yards, 3:40.

Fourth quarter

- TTU – Dakota Allen 0-yard fumble recovery (Clayton Hatfield kick), 12:50. Tied 31–31.
- ISU – Alan Bowman penalty in end zone, 4:39. Cyclones 33–31.
- ISU – Hakeem Butler 48-yard pass from Brock Purdy (Connor Assalley kick), 2:25. Cyclones 40–31. Drive: 5 plays, 75 yards, 2:14.

Top passers

- TTU – Alan Bowman – 32/56, 323 yards, TD, 3 INT
- ISU – Brock Purdy – 13/27, 250 yards, 2 TD

Top rushers

- TTU – Da'Leon Ward – 10 carries, 16 yards
- ISU – David Montgomery – 32 carries, 125, yards, 2 TD

Top receivers

- TTU – Antoine Wesley – 8 receptions, 119 yards, TD
- ISU – Hakeem Butler – 4 receptions, 148 yards, TD

Statistics	Red Raiders	Iowa State
Total yards	363	422
Passing yards	333	250
Rushing yards	30	172
Penalties	10–105	4–25
Turnovers	3	1
Time of Possession	26:00	34:00

=== Oklahoma ===
No. 7 Oklahoma Sooners at Texas Tech Red Raiders – Game summary

Quarter	1	2	3	4	Total
No. 7 Sooners	7	21	7	16	51
Red Raiders	14	17	0	15	46

at Jones AT&T Stadium, Lubbock, TX

- Date: November 3
- Game time: 7:00 p.m.
- Game weather: Temperature: 54 °F (12 °C) • Weather: cloudy • Wind: N 17 MPH
- Game attendance: 60,454
- Referee: Reggie Smith
- TV announcers (ABC): Steve Levy, Brian Griese, Todd McShay

Game information

First quarter

- TTU – T. J. Vasher 6-yard pass from Alan Bowman (Clayton Hatfield kick), 10:30. Red Raiders 7–0. Drive: 2 plays, 3 yards, 0:38.
- TTU – Ta'Zhawn Henry 14-yard pass from Jett Duffey (Clayton Hatfield kick), 6:59. Red Raiders 14–0. Drive: 4 plays, 25 yards, 1:44.
- OKLA – Lee Morris 16-yard pass from Kyler Murray (Austin Seibert kick), 4:11. Red Raiders 14–7. Drive: 6 plays, 75 yards, 2:48.

Second quarter

- TTU – Clayton Hatfield 43-yard field goal, 14:03. Red Raiders 17–7. Drive: 10 plays, 50 yards, 5:08.
- OKLA – Kyler Murray 12-yard run (Austin Seibert kick), 12:17. Red Raiders 17–14. Drive: 6 plays, 75 yards, 1:46.
- TTU – Da'Leon Ward 45-yard pass from Alan Bowman (Clayton Hatfield kick), 11:35. Red Raiders 24–14. Drive: 3 plays, 75 yards, 0:42.
- OKLA – Trey Sermon 5-yard run (Austin Seibert kick), 8:53. Red Raiders 24–21. Drive: 8 plays, 83 yards, 2:42.
- OKLA – Carson Meier 5-yard pass from Kyler Murray (Austin Seibert kick), 4:22. Sooners 28–24. Drive: 7 plays, 99 yards, 3:31.
- TTU – Da'Leon Ward 1-yard run (Clayton Hatfield kick), 0:56. Red Raiders 31–28. Drive: 9 plays, 75 yards, 3:26.

Third quarter

- OKLA – Lee Morris 46-yard pass from Kyler Murray (Austin Seibert kick), 12:05. Sooners 35–31. Drive: 4 plays, 69 yards, 1:21.

Fourth quarter

- TTU – Clayton Hatfield 26-yard field goal, 14:43. Sooners 35–34. Drive: 5 plays, 54 yards, 1:34.
- OKLA – Trey Sermon 20-yard run (Austin Seibert kick), 11:54. Sooners 42–34. Drive: 8 plays, 75 yards, 2:49.
- TTU – Zach Austin 4-yard pass from Jett Duffey (pass failed), 6:54. Sooners 42–40. Drive: 12 plays, 75 yards, 5:00.
- OKLA – Robert Barnes defensive PAT conversion, 6:54. Sooners 44–40.
- OKLA – Trey Sermon 30-yard run (Austin Seibert kick), 2:51. Sooners 51–40. Drive: 7 plays, 75 yards, 4:03.
- TTU – Jett Duffey 1-yard run (pass failed), 1:05. Sooners 51–46. Drive: 8 plays, 54 yards, 1:46.

Top passers

- OKLA – Kyler Murray – 20/35, 360 yards, 3 TD, 2 INT
- TTU – Alan Bowman – 21/26, 227 yards, 2 TD

Top rushers

- OKLA – Trey Sermon – 26 carries, 206 yards, 3 TD
- TTU – Da'Leon Ward – 8 carries, 53 yards, TD

Top receivers

- OKLA – Lee Morris – 4 receptions, 101 yards, 2 TD
- TTU – Antoine Wesley – 12 receptions, 199 yards

Statistics	Oklahoma	Texas Tech
Total yards	683	473
Passing yards	360	366
Rushing yards	323	107
Penalties	10–113	7–69
Turnovers	2	0
Time of Possession	32:11	27:49

Quarterback Alan Bowman left the game at halftime for an unknown reason. It was later revealed that Bowman might have re-aggravated his previous injury where he suffered a partially collapsed lung.

=== Texas ===
No. 15 Texas Longhorns at Texas Tech Red Raiders – Game summary

Quarter	1	2	3	4	Total
No. 15 Longhorns	0	17	10	14	41
Red Raiders	7	3	0	24	34

at Jones AT&T Stadium, Lubbock, TX

- Date: November 10
- Game time: 6:30 p.m.
- Game weather: Temperature: 49 °F (9 °C) • Wind: SSW 10 MPH • Weather: clear skies
- Game attendance: 60,454
- Referee: Mike Defee
- TV: FOX

Game information

First quarter

- TTU – T. J. Vasher 5-yard pass from Jett Duffey (Clayton Hatfield kick), 10:48. Red Raiders 7–0. Drive: 10 plays, 66 yards, 4:12.

Second quarter

- TEX – Cameron Dicker 52-yard field goal, 13:40. Red Raiders 7–3. Drive: 12 plays, 60 yards, 4:14.
- TEX – Lil'Jordan Humphrey 9-yard pass from Sam Ehlinger (Cameron Dicker kick), 3:46. Longhorns 10–7. Drive: 18 plays, 60 yards, 8:10.
- TEX – Keaontay Ingram 2-yard run (Cameron Dicker kick), 1:16. Longhorns 17–7. Drive: 4 plays, 34 yards, 0:59.
- TTU – Clayton Hatfield 41-yard field goal, 0:07. Longhorns 17–10. Drive: 9 plays, 52 yards, 1:09.

Third quarter

- TEX – Devin Duvernay 1-yard pass from Sam Ehlinger (Cameron Dicker kick), 10:17. Longhorns 24–10. Drive: 12 plays, 75 yards, 4:43.
- TEX – Cameron Dicker 46-yard field goal, 1:57. Longhorns 27–10. Drive: 11 plays, 52 yards, 4:59.

Fourth quarter

- TTU – Antoine Wesley 57-yard pass from Jett Duffey (Clayton Hatfield kick), 13:26. Longhorns 27–17. Drive: 3 plays, 64 yards, 0:33.
- TEX – Devin Duvernay 39-yard pass from Sam Ehlinger (Cameron Dicker kick), 10:26. Longhorns 34–17. Drive: 5 plays, 92 yards, 3:00.
- TTU – Clayton Hatfield 36-yard field goal, 6:23. Longhorns 34–20. Drive: 12 plays, 57 yards, 4:03.
- TTU – T. J. Vasher 2-yard pass from Jett Duffey (Clayton Hatfield kick), 4:47. Longhorns 34–27. Drive: 8 plays, 61 yards, 1:36.
- TTU – Antoine Wesley 9-yard pass from Jett Duffey (Clayton Hatfield kick), 1:45. Tied 34–34. Drive: 5 plays, 77 yards, 1:24.
- TEX – Lil'Jordan Humphrey 29-yard pass from Sam Ehlinger (Cameron Dicker kick), 0:21. Longhorns 41–34. Drive: 7 plays, 75 yards, 1:24.

Top passers

- TEX – Sam Ehlinger – 22/34, 312 yards, 4 TD
- TTU – Jett Duffey – 37/47, 444 yards, 4 TD, INT

Top rushers

- TEX – Keaontay Ingram – 14 carries, 83 yards, TD
- TTU – Jett Duffey – 17 carries, 80 yards

Top receivers

- TEX – Lil'Jordan Humphrey – 8 receptions, 153 yards, 2 TD
- TTU – Antoine Wesley – 8 receptions, 171 yards, 2 TD

Statistics	Texas	Texas Tech
Total yards	469	595
Passing yards	312	454
Rushing yards	157	141
Penalties	6–59	8–89
Turnovers	0	3
Time of Possession	33:08	26:52

=== At Kansas State ===
Texas Tech Red Raiders at Kansas State Wildcats – Game summary

Quarter	1	2	3	4	Total
Red Raiders	6	0	0	0	6
Wildcats	0	10	5	6	21

at Bill Snyder Family Stadium, Manhattan, KS

- Date: November 17
- Game time: 2:30 p.m.
- TV announcers (ESPNU): Mike Golic Jr., Jay Alter

Game information

First quarter

- TTU – Clayton Hatfield 39-yard field goal, 11:55. Red Raiders 3–0. Drive: 8 plays, 46 yards, 3:05.
- TTU – Clayton Hatfield 42-yard field goal, 1:26. Red Raiders 6–0. Drive: 11 plays, 47 yards, 4:11.

Second quarter

- KSU – Blake Lynch 20-yard field goal, 13:27. Red Raiders 6–3. Drive: 8 plays, 51 yards, 2:54.
- KSU – Malik Knowles 8-yard pass from Skylar Thompson (Blake Lynch kick), 0:43. Wildcats 10–6. Drive: 7 plays, 48 yards, 2:21.

Third quarter

- KSU – Dominic Panazzolo punt blocked, 9:13. Wildcats 12–6.
- KSU – Blake Lynch 34-yard field goal, 3:27. Wildcats 15–6. Drive: 4 plays, 3 yards, 1:35.

Fourth quarter

- KSU – Blake Lynch 41-yard field goal, 10:23. Wildcats 18–6. Drive: 11 plays, 69 yards, 4:44.
- KSU – Blake Lynch 22-yard field goal, 3:39. Wildcats 21–6. Drive: 6 plays, 11 yards, 2:05.

Top passers

- TTU – Jett Duffey – 19/27, 150 yards, INT
- KSU – Skylar Thompson – 18/27, 218 yards, 2 TD, INT

Top rushers

- TTU – Da'Leon Ward – 10 carries, 34 yards
- KSU – Alex Barnes – 32 carries, 136 yards

Top receivers

- TTU – T. J. Vasher – 6 receptions, 69 yards
- KSU – Malik Knowles – 5 receptions, 56 yards, TD

Statistics	Texas Tech	Kansas State
Total yards	181	367
Passing yards	150	213
Rushing yards	31	154
Penalties	4–37	2–20
Turnovers	3	1
Time of Possession	22:11	37:49

The Red Raiders experienced their fourth consecutive loss when traveling to Manhattan. Tech was without starting quarterback Alan Bowman and offensive players Connor Killian and Mason Reed were also out. Tech ran the ball 26 times for 31 yards and has not had a ball carrier reach 65 yards in the past seven games. Tech's 181 yards of total offense was the lowest output since 2010 against the Texas Longhorns.

Kansas State kicker Blake Lynch had not completed a successful field goal in a game for nearly two months, but managed to match a career-high with four straight and added an extra point. A blocked punt by Kansas State's Brock Monty added to K-State's success with Texas Tech losing by a score of 21–6.

=== Vs. Baylor ===
Texas Tech Red Raiders vs. Baylor Bears (Texas Farm Bureau Insurance Shootout) – Game summary

Quarter	1	2	3	4	Total
Bears	7	7	14	7	35
Red Raiders	10	7	0	7	24

at AT&T Stadium, Arlington, TX

- Date: November 24
- Game time: 11:00 a.m.
- Game weather: Played indoors (retractable roof closed)
- Game attendance: 27,308
- Referee: Brad Van Vark
- TV: FS1

Game information

First quarter

- TTU – Ja'Deion High 54-yard pass from McLane Carter (Clayton Hatfield kick), 12:04. Red Raiders 7–0. Drive: 8 plays, 75 yards, 2:56.
- BAY – Denzel Mims 6-yard pass from Charlie Brewer (Connor Martin kick), 2:54. Tied 7–7. Drive: 19 plays, 75 yards, 9:10.
- TTU – Clayton Hatfield 42-yard field goal, 0:27. Red Raiders 10–7. Drive: 9 plays, 51 yards, 2:27.

Second quarter

- BAY – Tyquan Thornton 41-yard pass from Charlie Brewer (Connor Martin kick), 14:10. Bears 14–10. Drive: 5 plays, 75 yards, 1:17.
- TTU – Demarcus Felton 7-yard run (Clayton Hatfield kick), 12:23. Red Raiders 17–14. Drive: 6 plays, 75 yards, 1:47.

Third quarter

- BAY – Charlie Brewer 1-yard run (Connor Martin kick), 13:11. Bears 21–17. Drive: 7 plays, 75 yards, 1:49.
- BAY – John Lovett 3-yard run (Connor Martin kick), 9:57. Bears 28–17. Drive: 9 plays, 67 yards, 2:39.

Fourth quarter

- TTU – Seth Collins 7-yard pass from McLane Carter (Clayton Hatfield kick), 14:54. Bears 28–24. Drive: 14 plays, 52 yards, 5:21.
- BAY – Denzel Mims 16-yard pass from Charlie Brewer (Connor Martin kick), 12:41. Bears 35–24. Drive: 5 plays, 75 yards, 2:13.

Top passers

- BAY – Charlie Brewer – 22/30, 308 yards, 3 TD, INT
- TTU – McLane Carter – 21/37, 247 yards, 2 TD, 2 INT

Top rushers

- BAY – John Lovett – 28 carries, 125 yards, TD
- TTU – Da'Leon Ward – 15 carries, 75 yards

Top receivers

- BAY – Chris Platt – 6 receptions, 114 yards
- TTU – Ja'Deion High – 5 receptions, 89 yards, TD

Statistics	Baylor	Texas Tech
Total yards	478	347
Passing yards	308	247
Rushing yards	170	100
Penalties	12–80	8–85
Turnovers	2	2
Time of Possession	36:04	23:56

== Statistics ==
=== Scoring ===
Scores against non-conference opponents

	1	2	3	4	Total
Opponents	45	13	21	17	96
Texas Tech	35	59	38	35	167

Scores against the Big 12

	1	2	3	4	Total
Opponents	41	62	38	50	191
Texas Tech	41	51	34	83	209

Scores against all opponents

	1	2	3	4	Total
Opponents	106	103	59	67	335
Texas Tech	78	110	72	118	378

=== Offense ===
Passing statistics
#	POS	NAME	RAT	CMP	ATT	YDS	AVG	CMP%	TD	INT	LONG	Ref
10	QB	Alan Bowman	150.1	227	327	2,638	8.1	69.4	17	7	66	
7	QB	Jett Duffey	143.5	104	154	1,221	7.9	67.5	8	6	62	
6	QB	McLane Carter	112.4	28	51	318	6.2	54.9	2	2	54	
12	QB	Colt Garrett	799.6	1	1	44	44.0	100.0	1	0	44	
22	WR	Seth Collins	92.0	1	2	10	5.0	50.0	0	0	10	
		TOTALS	145.6	361	535	4,231	7.9	67.5	28	15	66	

Rushing statistics
#	POS	NAME	CAR	YDS	AVG	LONG	TD
7	QB	Jett Duffey	79	369	4.7	38	4
21	RB	Da'Leon Ward	79	341	4.3	32	3
26	RB	Ta'Zhawn Henry	86	341	4.3	32	8
2	RB	Demarcus Felton	62	295	4.8	34	6
24	RB	Tre King	40	160	4.0	18	1
28	RB	SaRodorick Thompson	25	105	4.2	21	3
82	WR	KeSean Carter	3	28	9.3	14	0
29	FB	Mason Reed	5	11	2.2	5	0
12	QB	Colt Garrett	2	9	4.5	6	0
22	WR	Seth Collins	2	6	3.0	10	0
8	WR	De'Quan Bowman	1	4	4.0	4	0
4	WR	Antoine Wesley	1	-2	-2.0	0	0
6	QB	McLane Carter	9	-3	-0.3	13	0
10	QB	Alan Bowman	29	-26	-0.9	12	1
		TOTALS	437	1,591	3.6	38	26

Receiving statistics
#	POS	NAME	REC	YDS	AVG	LONG	TD
4	WR	Antoine Wesley	88	1,410	16.0	66	9
88	WR	Ja'Deion High	62	804	13.0	62	4
9	WR	T.J. Vasher	54	687	12.7	37	7
22	WR	Seth Collins	32	317	9.9	32	2
82	WR	KeSean Carter	26	238	9.2	25	1
21	RB	Da'Leon Ward	26	196	7.5	45	1
26	RB	Ta'Zhawn Henry	22	145	6.6	17	1
19	WR	Zach Austin	17	143	8.4	20	1
8	WR	De'Quan Bowman	10	90	9.0	17	1
84	WR	Erik Ezukanma	2	48	24.0	44	1
24	RB	Tre King	8	48	6.0	13	0
86	WR	Dalton Rigdon	3	29	9.7	10	0
11	WR	Donta Thompson	2	21	10.5	11	0
2	RB	Demarcus Felton	3	14	4.7	9	0
89	WR	Caden Leggett	1	12	12.0	12	0
10	QB	Alan Bowman	1	10	10.0	10	0
28	RB	SaRodorick Thompson	2	10	5.0	12	0
29	FB	Mason Reed	1	8	8.0	8	0
40	FB	Connor Killian	1	1	1.0	1	0
		TOTALS	361	4,231	11.7	66	28

=== Special teams ===
Kicking statistics
#	Name	FGM	FGA	PCT	1–19	20–29	30–39	40–49	50+	LNG	XPM	XPA	PTS	Ref
96	Clayton Hatfield	17	19	89.5	0/0	6/6	4/6	7/7	0/0	48	55	55	106	

== Weekly awards ==
- Big 12 Defensive Player of the Week

Dakota Allen (week 8 vs. Kansas)

- Big 12 Special Teams Player of the Week

Dominic Pannazzolo (week 7 vs. TCU)
Clayton Hatfield (week 8 vs. Kansas)

- Big 12 Newcomer of the Week

Alan Bowman (week 3 vs. Houston)

- CBS Sports Freshman of the Week

Alan Bowman (week 3 vs. Houston)

- Earl Campbell Tyler Rose Player of the Week

Alan Bowman (week 3 vs. Houston)

- Manning Award Quarterback of the Week

Alan Bowman (Week 3 vs. Houston)

== Rankings ==
Ranking movements Legend: ██ Increase in ranking ██ Decrease in ranking — = Not ranked RV = Received votes
	Week																
Poll	Pre	1	2	3	4	5	6	7	8	9	10	11	12	13	14	15	Final
AP	—	—	—	—	25	—	—	RV	RV	—	RV	—	—	—	—	—	—
Coaches	—	—	—	—	RV	—	—	RV	RV	—	—	—	—	—	—	—	—
CFP	Not released									—	—	—	—	—	—	—	Not released

== Aftermath ==
Texas Tech failed to gain bowl eligibility. Upon the conclusion of the season (after the loss to Baylor), head coach Kliff Kingsbury was fired. Oregon defensive coordinator Jim Leavitt was reported to have interviewed for the position with Texas Tech's athletics director Kirby Hocut. The Red Raiders have their next game scheduled for the 2019 season as the program's home opener on August 31, 2019, against Montana State.

== Players drafted into the NFL ==
Round	Pick	Player	Position	NFL Club
7	251	Dakota Allen	LB	Los Angeles Rams
