= 2020 Texas Tech Red Raiders football team =

American college football season

2020 Texas Tech Red Raiders football
- Conference: Big 12 Conference
- Record: 4–6 (3–6 Big 12)
- Head coach: Matt Wells (2nd season)
- Offensive coordinator: David Yost (2nd season)
- Offensive scheme: Hurry-up spread
- Defensive coordinator: Keith Patterson (2nd season)
- Co-defensive coordinator: Derek Jones (1st season)
- Base defense: 3–3–5
- Home stadium: Jones AT&T Stadium

2020 Big 12 Conference football standings
	Conf.			Overall
Team	W		L	W		L
No. 9 Iowa State y	8	–	1	9	–	3
No. 6 Oklahoma y$	6	–	2	9	–	2
No. 20 Oklahoma State	6	–	3	8	–	3
No. 19 Texas	5	–	3	7	–	3
TCU	5	–	4	6	–	4
West Virginia	4	–	4	6	–	4
Kansas State	4	–	5	4	–	6
Texas Tech	3	–	6	4	–	6
Baylor	2	–	7	2	–	7
Kansas	0	–	8	0	–	9
Championship: Oklahoma 27, Iowa State 21
$ – Conference champion; y – Championship game participant; Rankings from AP Poll.

The 2020 Texas Tech Red Raiders football team represented Texas Tech University in the 2020 NCAA Division I FBS football season. The team was led by Matt Wells in his second season as the program's 16th head coach. The Red Raiders played their home games on the university's campus in Lubbock, Texas at Jones AT&T Stadium, and competed as members of the Big 12 Conference. Due to the COVID-19 pandemic, the stadium's capacity was reduced to 25%.

On December 14, just over a week after the team's game against Kansas, offensive coordinator David Yost was fired. The Red Raiders finished the season with the 60th ranked offense in FBS, averaging 29.1 points per game.

== Preseason ==
=== Recruiting class ===
College recruiting
Name	Hometown	School	Height	Weight	Commit date
Philip Blidi; Defensive Line	Portales, NM	Portales HS	6 ft 4 in (1.93 m)	260 lb (120 kg)	Feb 5, 2020
Philip Blidi; Defensive Line	Recruit ratings: Scout: Rivals: 247Sports: ESPN:				
Tahj Brooks; Running Back	Manor, TX	Manor HS	5 ft 11 in (1.80 m)	215 lb (98 kg)	Dec 18, 2019
Tahj Brooks; Running Back	Recruit ratings: Scout: Rivals: 247Sports: ESPN:				
Ethan Carde; Offensive Lineman	Valrico, FL	Bloomingdale HS; Coffeyville CC	6 ft 8 in (2.03 m)	325 lb (147 kg)	Dec 18, 2019
Ethan Carde; Offensive Lineman	Recruit ratings: Scout: Rivals: 247Sports: ESPN:				
Jonathan Davis; Defensive Back	Dallas, TX	South Oak Cliff HS	6 ft 1 in (1.85 m)	170 lb (77 kg)	Dec 18, 2019
Jonathan Davis; Defensive Back	Recruit ratings: Scout: Rivals: 247Sports: ESPN:				
Devin Drew; Defensive Lineman	Kansas City, MO	Raytown HS; Iowa Western CC	6 ft 3 in (1.91 m)	260 lb (120 kg)	Dec 18, 2019
Devin Drew; Defensive Lineman	Recruit ratings: Scout: Rivals: 247Sports: ESPN:				
Nate Floyd; Defensive Back	College Station, TX	A&M Consolidated HS	6 ft 0 in (1.83 m)	175 lb (79 kg)	Dec 18, 2019
Nate Floyd; Defensive Back	Recruit ratings: Scout: Rivals: 247Sports: ESPN:				
Loic Fouonji; Wide Receiver	Midland, TX	Midland Lee HS	6 ft 4 in (1.93 m)	185 lb (84 kg)	Dec 18, 2019
Loic Fouonji; Wide Receiver	Recruit ratings: Scout: Rivals: 247Sports: ESPN:				
Ryan Frank; Defensive Back	Magnolia, TX	Magnolia West HS	6 ft 4 in (1.93 m)	185 lb (84 kg)	Dec 18, 2019
Ryan Frank; Defensive Back	Recruit ratings: Scout: Rivals: 247Sports: ESPN:				
John Holcomb; Tight End	Wellington, TX	Wellington HS	6 ft 5 in (1.96 m)	215 lb (98 kg)	Dec 18, 2019
John Holcomb; Tight End	Recruit ratings: Scout: Rivals: 247Sports: ESPN:				
Derrick Lewis II; Linebacker	Schertz, TX	Samuel Clemens HS	6 ft 1 in (1.85 m)	215 lb (98 kg)	Dec 18, 2019
Derrick Lewis II; Linebacker	Recruit ratings: Scout: Rivals: 247Sports: ESPN:				
Krishon Merriweather; Linebacker	Hazelwood, MO	Hazelwood West HS; Garden City CC	6 ft 0 in (1.83 m)	230 lb (100 kg)	Dec 18, 2019
Krishon Merriweather; Linebacker	Recruit ratings: Scout: Rivals: 247Sports: ESPN:				
Kobee Minor; Defensive Back	Lake Dallas, TX	Lake Dallas HS	5 ft 11 in (1.80 m)	160 lb (73 kg)	Dec 18, 2019
Kobee Minor; Defensive Back	Recruit ratings: Scout: Rivals: 247Sports: ESPN:				
Larry Moore; Offensive Lineman	Missouri City, TX	Fort Bend Marshall HS	6 ft 5 in (1.96 m)	285 lb (129 kg)	Dec 18, 2019
Larry Moore; Offensive Lineman	Recruit ratings: Scout: Rivals: 247Sports: ESPN:				
L. B. Moore; Outside Linebacker	Amarillo, TX	Tascosa HS	6 ft 5 in (1.96 m)	285 lb (129 kg)	Dec 18, 2019
L. B. Moore; Outside Linebacker	Recruit ratings: Scout: Rivals: 247Sports: ESPN:				
Ja'Lynn Polk; Wide Receiver	Lufkin, TX	Lufkin HS	6 ft 2 in (1.88 m)	185 lb (84 kg)	Dec 18, 2019
Ja'Lynn Polk; Wide Receiver	Recruit ratings: Scout: Rivals: 247Sports: ESPN:				
Myles Price; Wide Receiver	The Colony, TX	The Colony HS	5 ft 9 in (1.75 m)	170 lb (77 kg)	Dec 18, 2019
Myles Price; Wide Receiver	Recruit ratings: Scout: Rivals: 247Sports: ESPN:				
Brandon Bouyer–Randle; Linebacker	Battle Creek, MI	Battle Creek Central HS; Michigan State	6 ft 2 in (1.88 m)	235 lb (107 kg)	Dec 18, 2019
Brandon Bouyer–Randle; Linebacker	Recruit ratings: Scout: Rivals: 247Sports: ESPN:				
Caleb Rogers; Offensive Lineman	Mansfield, TX	Lake Ridge HS	6 ft 5 in (1.96 m)	275 lb (125 kg)	Dec 18, 2019
Caleb Rogers; Offensive Lineman	Recruit ratings: Scout: Rivals: 247Sports: ESPN:				
Donovan Smith; Quarterback	Las Vegas, NV	Frenship HS	6 ft 3 in (1.91 m)	190 lb (86 kg)	Dec 18, 2019
Donovan Smith; Quarterback	Recruit ratings: Scout: Rivals: 247Sports: ESPN:				
J. J. Sparkman; Wide Receiver	Longview, TX	Pine Tree HS	6 ft 4 in (1.93 m)	190 lb (86 kg)	Dec 18, 2019
J. J. Sparkman; Wide Receiver	Recruit ratings: Scout: Rivals: 247Sports: ESPN:				

=== Award watch lists ===
Listed in the order that they were released

Award	Player	Position	Year
Butkus Award	Riko Jeffers	LB	SR
Davey O'Brien Award	Alan Bowman	QB	SO
Doak Walker Award	SaRodorick Thompson	RB	SO
Wuerffel Trophy	Zech McPhearson	DB	SR

=== Big 12 media days ===
The Big 12 media days were held on July 21–22, 2020 in a virtual format due to the COVID-19 pandemic.

=== Big 12 media poll ===
Big 12 media poll
Predicted finish	Team	Votes (1st place)
1	Oklahoma	888 (80)
2	Oklahoma State	742 (6)
3	Texas	727 (4)
4	Iowa State	607
5	Baylor	489
6	TCU	477
7	Kansas State	366
8	West Virginia	287
9	Texas Tech	267
10	Kansas	100

== Schedule ==
Texas Tech had games scheduled against Alabama State, Arizona, and UTEP, but were canceled due to the COVID-19 pandemic.

Date	Time	Opponent	Site	TV	Result	Attendance
September 12	7:00 p.m.	Houston Baptist*	Jones AT&T Stadium; Lubbock, TX	ESPN+	W 35–33	11,157
September 26	2:30 p.m.	No. 8 Texas	Jones AT&T Stadium; Lubbock, TX (rivalry)	Fox	L 56–63 ^{OT}	16,615
October 3	2:30 p.m.	at Kansas State	Bill Snyder Family Football Stadium; Manhattan, KS	FS1	L 21–31	10,932
October 10	2:30 p.m.	at No. 24 Iowa State	Jack Trice Stadium; Ames, IA	ABC	L 15–31	13,502
October 24	4:30 p.m.	West Virginia^{†}	Jones AT&T Stadium; Lubbock, TX	ESPN2	W 34–27	13,532
October 31	7:00 p.m.	No. 24 Oklahoma	Jones AT&T Stadium; Lubbock, TX	Fox	L 28–62	14,431
November 7	2:30 p.m.	at TCU	Amon G. Carter Stadium; Fort Worth, TX (rivalry)	FS1	L 18–34	12,356
November 14	3:00 p.m.	Baylor	Jones AT&T Stadium; Lubbock, TX (rivalry)	FS1	W 24–23	12,914
November 28	11:00 a.m.	at No. 23 Oklahoma State	Boone Pickens Stadium; Stillwater, OK	Fox	L 44–50	14,645
December 5	11:00 a.m.	Kansas	Jones AT&T Stadium; Lubbock, TX	FS2	W 16–13	9,877
*Non-conference game; ^{†}Homecoming; Rankings from AP Poll and CFP Rankings (after November 24) released prior to game; All times are in Central time

Schedule source:

== Personnel ==
2020 Texas Tech Red Raiders football team roster
Players
Coaches
Offense

Pos.	#	Name	Class
QB	3	Henry Colombi	Jr
RB	4	SaRodorick Thompson	So
RB	5	Chadarius Townsend	Jr
QB	7	Donovan Smith	Fr
QB	8	Maverick McIvor	Fr
WR	9	T. J. Vasher	Sr
QB	10	Alan Bowman	So
WR	11	McLane Mannix	Sr
WR	12	Ja'Lynn Polk	Fr
WR	13	Erik Ezukanma	So
WR	14	Xavier White	So
TE	15	Travis Koontz	Sr
QB	16	Brylon Lawson-Young	So
QB	18	Myles Price	Fr
WR	19	Loic Fouonji	Fr
WR	22	Sterling Galban	So
TE	26	Jason Lloyd	So
RB	28	Tahj Brooks	Fr
RB	29	Kendell Jimerson	So
WR	32	Caleb Durham	Fr
RB	33	Ronnie Hart	So
WR	35	Mark Richardson	Jr
TE	40	Connor Killian	Sr
TE	41	Jayden York	Fr
RB	42	Chux Nwabuko III	So
TE	43	Henry Teeter	So
WR	45	Austin Brougham	So
OL	50	Josh Burger	Sr
OL	53	Trevor Robinson	Fr
OL	56	Jack Anderson	Jr
OL	59	DeMarcus Marshall	So
OL	60	CJ Zotz	Fr
OL	63	Aaron Castro	Fr
OL	64	Clayton Franks	So
OL	65	Zach Adams	Sr
OL	67	Troy Bradshaw	So
OL	68	Casey Verhulst	Jr
OL	69	John Stewart	Fr
OL	70	Weston Wright	So
OL	71	Reece Azam	Fr
OL	72	Landon Peterson	Fr
OL	73	Dawson Deaton	Jr
OL	74	Will Farrar	Jr
OL	75	Larry Moore III	Fr
OL	76	Caleb Rogers	Fr
OL	77	Ethan Carde	So
OL	78	Gage Peters	Fr
WR	80	Kevin Terry	So
WR	82	KeSean Carter	Jr
WR	83	Cameron Cantrell	Fr
WR	84	J. J. Sparkman	Fr
WR	85	Trey Cleveland	Fr
WR	86	Dalton Rigdon	Jr
TE	87	John Holcomb	Fr
WR	89	Caden Leggett	So

Defense

Pos.	#	Name	Class
DB	0	Seth Collins	Sr
DL	1	Tyree Wilson	So
LB	1	Krishon Merriweather	Jr
LB	2	Brandon Bouyer–Randle	Jr
DB	3	Xavier Martin	Jr
LB	6	Riko Jeffers	Sr
DB	7	Adrian Frye	Jr
DB	8	Zech McPhearson	Sr
DB	10	Cam White	Jr
DB	11	Eric Monroe	Sr
DB	14	Beau Iovinelli	So
DB	15	Cole Boyd	Fr
DB	16	Thomas Leggett	Sr
LB	17	Colin Schooler	Sr
DB	19	DeQuanteous Watts	Fr
LB	20	Kosi Eldridge	Jr
DB	21	Cameron Watts	So
DB	22	Ja'Marcus Ingram	Sr
DB	23	DaMarcus Fields	Sr
DB	24	Adam Beck	Jr
DB	25	Dadrion Taylor	So
DB	27	Alex Hogan	So
DB	29	Nate Floyd	Fr
DB	30	Kobee Minor	Fr
DB	31	Joseph Plunk	Fr
LB	32	Tyrique Matthews	So
DB	33	Kyan Brumfield	Jr
LB	34	Bryce Robinson	Fr
LB	35	Patrick Curley	So
DB	36	Brayden Gerlich	Fr
LB	37	Xavier Benson	So
DB	38	Jett Whitfield	Fr
LB	39	Michael Nelson	Jr
DB	40	Luis Jaramillo	Fr
LB	41	John Morgenstern	Sr
DB	43	Ryan Frank	Fr
LB	45	Christian Lavalle	Fr
DB	46	Jon-Jon Davis	Fr
LB	47	Ethan Frasier	Fr
LB	48	Derrick Lewis II	Fr
LB	50	Trent Low	Fr
LB	51	Joshua Rodriguez	Fr
DL	53	Eli Howard	Sr
LB	54	Bryce Ramirez	Fr
LB	56	Jackson Baggett	Fr
DL	57	Kole Pannell	Fr
DL	78	Alexander Poole	Jr
DL	90	Devin Drew	Jr
DL	91	Nelson Mbanasor	Jr
DL	92	L.B. Moore	Fr
DL	93	Troy Te'O	Jr
DL	94	Tre'Jon Lewis	Fr
DL	95	Jaylon Hutchings	So
DL	96	Philip Blidi	Fr
DL	97	Tony Bradford Jr.	So
DL	98	Nick McCann	Sr
DL	99	Gilbert Ibeneme	Fr

Special teams

Pos.	#	Name	Class
K, P	31	Austin McNamara	So
K	36	Trey Wolff	So
LS	42	John Berard	Jr
K, P	46	Johnathan Garibay	Jr
P	48	Cody Waddell	Sr
LS	54	Luke Rizzo	So
K	62	Gabriel Lozano	Fr

Head coach

- Matt Wells (Utah State)

Coordinators/assistant coaches

- David Yost (Dayton)
  Offensive coordinator/qb
- Keith Patterson (East Central)
  Defensive coordinator
- Derek Jones (Mississippi)
  Co-defensive coordinator/secondary
- Mark Tommerdahl (Wyoming)
  Special teams coordinator/assistant ol
- Kevin Cosgrove (Wisconsin–Oshkosh)
  Linebackers
- Steve Farmer (Illinois State)
  Offensive line
- Joel Filani (Texas Tech)
  Outside receivers
- Paul Randolph (UT Martin)
  Defensive line
- DeAndre Smith (Southwest Missouri State)
  Running backs
- Luke Wells (Oklahoma)
  Tight ends/inside receivers

Legend

- (C) Team captain
- (S) Suspended
- (I) Ineligible
- Injured
- Redshirt

Roster
Last update: May 25, 2020

== Game summaries ==
=== Houston Baptist ===
Houston Baptist Huskies at Texas Tech Red Raiders – Game summary

Quarter	1	2	3	4	Total
Huskies	3	7	10	13	33
Red Raiders	14	7	7	7	35

at Jones AT&T Stadium, Lubbock, Texas

- Date: September 12
- Game time: 7:00 p.m. CDT
- Game attendance: 11,157
- Referee: Brad Van Vark
- TV announcers (ESPN+): Anish Shroff, Tom Luginbill and Ian Fitzsimmons
- Box score, Recap

Game information

First quarter

- TTU – Erik Ezukanma 7-yard pass from Alan Bowman (Trey Wolff kick), 13:22. Red Raiders 7–0. Drive: 5 plays, 75 yards, 1:38.
- HBU – Gino Garcia 40-yard field goal, 10:11. Red Raiders 7–3. Drive: 9 plays, 53 yards, 3:11.
- TTU – SaRodorick Thompson 5-yard run (Trey Wolff kick), 3:39. Red Raiders 14–3. Drive: 11 plays, 95 yards, 4:18.

Second quarter

- TTU – Tahj Brooks 1-yard run (Trey Wolff kick), 6:22. Red Raiders 21–3. Drive: 8 plays, 42 yards, 2:32.
- HBU – D. J. Dormeus 65-yard pass from Bailey Zappe (Gino Garcia kick), 5:21. Red Raiders 21–10. Drive: 4 plays, 81 yards, 1:01.

Third quarter

- HBU – Gino Garcia 44-yard field goal, 8:25. Red Raiders 21–13. Drive: 6 plays, 17 yards, 1:42.
- HBU – Josh Sterns 65-yard pass from Bailey Zappe (Gino Garcia kick), 5:40. Red Raiders 21–20. Drive: 3 plays, 80 yards, 0:59.
- TTU – SaRodorick Thompson 8-yard run (Trey Wolff kick), 1:39. Red Raiders 28–20. Drive: 11 plays, 75 yards, 4:01.

Fourth quarter

- TTU – KeSean Carter 18-yard pass from Alan Bowman (Trey Wolff kick), 11:29. Red Raiders 35–20. Drive: 11 plays, 84 yards, 2:41.
- HBU – Josh Sterns 75-yard pass from Bailey Zappe (Gino Garcia kick), 11:19. Red Raiders 35–27. Drive: 1 play, 75 yards, 0:10.
- HBU – Jerreth Sterns 6-yard pass from Bailey Zappe (pass failed), 3:23. Red Raiders 35–33. Drive: 7 plays, 96 yards, 2:02.

Statistics	HBU	TTU
First downs	28	35
Total yards	600	624
Rushing yards	28	194
Passing yards	572	430
Turnovers	1	1
Time of possession	26:56	33:04

Team	Category	Player	Statistics
Houston Baptist	Passing	Bailey Zappe	30/49, 567 yards, 4 TD
Houston Baptist	Rushing	Ean Beek	16 rushes, 34 yards
Houston Baptist	Receiving	Josh Sterns	5 receptions, 209 yards, 2 TD
Texas Tech	Passing	Alan Bowman	38/52, 430 yards, 2 TD, INT
Texas Tech	Rushing	SaRodorick Thompson	22 rushes, 118 yards, 2 TD
Texas Tech	Receiving	KeSean Carter	6 receptions, 86 yards, TD

Texas Tech opened up the 2020 season at home against FCS opponent Houston Baptist. The Red Raiders' defense struggled to contain the Huskies' offense, giving up 600 total yards and allowing Houston Baptist quarterback Bailey Zappe to throw for 567 yards and four touchdowns.

Texas Tech received the opening kickoff and quickly went downfield with Alan Bowman finding Erik Ezukanma for a 7-yard touchdown pass with 13:22 left in the first quarter. Houston Baptist responded on its first drive with a 40-yard field goal from Gino Garcia to make it 7–3. The Red Raiders started their second drive on their own 25-yard line, with SaRodorick Thompson running for 3 yards on the first play. On the next play, Bowman found T. J. Vasher for a 12-yard pass, but on the next play Isaiah Cash intercepted a Bowman pass near midfield for the Huskies. Houston Baptist quarterback Bailey Zappe was sacked by Jaylon Hutchings for a 5-yard loss, Zappe threw an incomplete pass on the next play, then the Huskies were moved back another 5 yards following a false start penalty. On 3rd and 20 at the 50-yard line, the Huskies managed to gain back the lost yardage from the sack and penalty and punted the ball, which was downed at the Texas Tech 5-yard line. The Red Raiders went 95-yards downfield, ending the drive with a 5-yard touchdown run from Thompson to take a 14–3 lead.

On their next drive, the Huskies made it to the Texas Tech 1-yard line, but a pass by wide receiver Jerreth Sterns was intercepted by Zech McPhearson. The two teams traded punts, before Texas Tech scored another touchdown on a 1-yard run from Tahj Brooks; Houston Baptist responded on the following drive with its first touchdown of the game, a 65-yard pass from Zappe to D. J. Dormeus. The Red Raiders went three-and-out on their next drive, gaining just 3 yards. The Huskies started the next drive at their own 29-yard line and made it all the way to the Texas Tech 1-yard line. On 4th and goal from the 1-yard line, Houston Baptist went for it, but Sterns failed to get it in the end zone, turning the ball over on downs. Texas Tech ran out the clock to end the half with a 21–10 lead.

Both teams started the half by punting on their respective opening drives. On their second drive of the half, the Huskies started a comeback attempt with Garcia making a 44-yard field goal to make it 13–21. Texas Tech made it to the Houston Baptist 42-yard line on the next drive before punting the ball. The Huskies started the next drive on their own 20-yard line, with the first play being an Ean Beek run for a loss of 5 yards. On the next play, Zappe found Sterns for a 30-yard pass. The next play was quickly blown dead due to an illegal holding penalty against Houston Baptist, moving the team back 10 yards. Following the penalty, Zappe threw a 65-yard pass to Sterns for a touchdown, trailing 20–21 with 5:40 left in the third. The Red Raiders responded with an 11 play, 75-yard drive that culminated with 8-yard touchdown run from Thompson. The quarter ended with a 14-yard pass from Zappe to Ben Ratzlaff, putting Houston Baptist in Texas Tech territory.

The Huskies' drive stalled and the team was forced to punt from the Texas Tech 40-yard line, downing the ball at the 16-yard line. The Red Raiders quickly went down field, capping the drive with an 18-yard touchdown pass from Bowman to KeSean Carter to extend the lead to 35–20. The fifteen point lead would be short lived, as Houston Baptist responded on the first play the following drive, with Zappe throwing a 75-yard touchdown pass to Sterns. Texas Tech had a chance to out the game away on its following drive, but turned the ball over on downs at the Houston Baptist 4-yard line with 5:25 left in regulation. The Red Raiders' defense gave up two big plays on the Huskies' next offensive drive: a 45-yard pass that put the Huskies into Texas Tech territory and a 27-yard pass to put them at the 2-yard line. On 1st and goal from the 2-yard line, Beek attempted to run it into the end zone, but was tackled for a 4-yard loss. The Huskies found the end zone on the next play with Zappe throwing a 6-yard pass to Sterns to make it 33–35 with 3:23 left in regulation. Houston Baptist went for a two-point conversion, but Zappe's pass was incomplete. Garcia kicked the ball back to Texas Tech, with the ball landing in the end zone for a touchback. The Huskies' defense failed to stop the Red Raiders, who ran out the clock to end the game with a 35–33 victory.

=== No. 8 Texas ===
No. 8 Texas Longhorns at Texas Tech Red Raiders – Game summary

Quarter	1	2	3	4	OT	Total
No. 8 Longhorns	17	14	7	18	7	63
Red Raiders	7	14	21	14	0	56

at Jones AT&T Stadium, Lubbock, Texas

- Date: September 26
- Game time: 2:30 p.m. CDT
- Game weather: Temperature: 93 °F (34 °C) • Weather: clear • Wind: S 14 MPH
- Game attendance: 16,615
- Referee: Scott Campbell
- TV announcers (Fox): Tim Brando and Spencer Tillman
- Box score, Recap

Game information

First quarter

- TEX – Sam Ehlinger 2-yard run (Cameron Dicker kick), 9:11. Longhorns 7–0. Drive: 13 plays, 75 yards, 5:49.
- TTU – KeSean Carter 13-yard pass from Alan Bowman (Trey Wolff kick), 7:00. Tied 7–7. Drive: 6 plays, 75 yards, 2:11.
- TEX – Cameron Dicker 43-yard field goal, 4:24. Longhorns 10–7. Drive: 8 plays, 32 yards, 2:36.
- TEX – Joshua Moore 31-yard pass from Sam Ehlinger (Cameron Dicker kick), 0:41. Longhorns 17–7. Drive: 7 plays, 70 yards, 3:09.

Second quarter

- TTU – KeSean Carter 22-yard pass from Alan Bowman (Trey Wolff kick), 12:11. Longhorns 17–14. Drive: 3 plays, 49 yards, 1:26.
- TEX – Roschon Johnson 1-yard run (Cameron Dicker kick), 7:48. Longhorns 24–14. Drive: 9 plays, 51 yards, 4:13.
- TTU – Erik Ezukanma 19-yard pass from Alan Bowman (Trey Wolff kick), 4:44. Longhorns 24–21. Drive: 11 plays, 75 yards, 3:04.'
- TEX – Brenden Schooler 3-yard pass from Sam Ehlinger (Cameron Dicker kick), 1:08. Longhorns 31–21. Drive: 4 plays, 19 yards, 1:27.

Third quarter

- TTU – Xavier Martin 0-yard fumble return (Trey Wolff kick), 14:08. Longhorns 31–28.
- TEX – Jahdae Barron 2-yard punt return (Cameron Dicker kick), 12:21. Longhorns 38–28.
- TTU – T. J. Vasher 29-yard pass from Alan Bowman (Trey Wolff kick), 0:44. Longhorns 38–35. Drive: 6 plays, 67 yards, 2:53.
- TTU – SaRodorick Thompson 10-yard run (Trey Wolff kick), 0:00. Red Raiders 42–38. Drive: 1 play, 10 yards, 0:04.

Fourth quarter

- TEX – Cameron Dicker 26-yard field goal, 10:47. Red Raiders 42–41. Drive: 12 plays, 64 yards, 4:13.
- TTU – T. J. Vasher 18-yard pass from Alan Bowman (Trey Wolff kick), 6:12. Red Raiders 49–41. Drive: 6 plays, 56 yards, 2:13.
- TTU – SaRodorick Thompson 75-yard run (Trey Wolff kick), 3:13. Red Raiders 56–41. Drive: 2 plays, 78 yards, 0:59.
- TEX – Brennan Eagles 12-yard pass from Sam Ehlinger (Cameron Dicker kick), 2:39. Red Raiders 56–48. Drive: 4 plays, 59 yards, 0:34.
- TEX – Joshua Moore 18-yard pass from Sam Ehlinger (Ehlinger pass to Eagles), 0:40. Tied 56–56. Drive: 6 plays, 42 yards, 1:59.

Overtime

- TEX – Joshua Moore 12-yard pass from Sam Ehlinger (Cameron Dicker kick). Longhorns 63–56. Drive: 3 plays, 25 yards.

Statistics	TEX	TTU
First downs	27	24
Total yards	476	441
Rushing yards	214	110
Passing yards	262	331
Turnovers	2	3
Time of possession	34:39	25:21

Team	Category	Player	Statistics
Texas	Passing	Sam Ehlinger	27/40, 262 yards, 5 TD, INT
Texas	Rushing	Keaontay Ingram	12 rushes, 89 yards
Texas	Receiving	Joshua Moore	5 receptions, 73 yards, 3 TD
Texas Tech	Passing	Alan Bowman	31/52, 331 yards, 5 TD, 3 INT
Texas Tech	Rushing	SaRodorick Thompson	16 rushes, 104 yards, 2 TD
Texas Tech	Receiving	Erik Ezukanma	7 receptions, 91 yards, TD

The defensive struggles for Texas Tech continued in the first half of the game, giving up 31 points to the Texas offense. After being down 21–31 at halftime, the Red Raiders stormed back in the 3rd quarter, scoring 21 points while only giving up 7, to lead 42–38 heading into the 4th. The Longhorns scored a touchdown with 2:39 left in the 4th to trail 48–56. Texas recovered an onside kick on the ensuing kickoff and scored another touchdown on the drive to trail 54–56 and made the two-point conversion to tie the game 56–56 with 0:40 left in regulation. The Longhorns would go on to win the game in overtime after scoring a touchdown and intercepting an Alan Bowman pass to end the game.

=== At Kansas State ===
Texas Tech Red Raiders at Kansas State Wildcats – Game summary

Quarter	1	2	3	4	Total
Red Raiders	0	0	14	7	21
Wildcats	7	7	3	14	31

at Bill Snyder Family Football Stadium, Manhattan, Kansas

- Date: October 3
- Game time: 2:30 p.m. CDT
- Game weather: Temperature: 66 °F (19 °C) • weather: sunny • wind: N 12 MPH
- Game attendance: 10,932
- Referee: Tuta Salaam
- TV announcers (FS1): Joe Davis and Mark Helfrich
- Box score, Recap

Game information

First quarter

- KSU – Briley Moore 12-yard pass from Skylar Thompson (Blake Lynch kick), 8:56. Wildcats 7–0. Drive: 3 plays, 20 yards, 0:54.

Second quarter

- KSU – Deuce Vaughn 18-yard run (Blake Lynch kick), 5:25. Wildcats 14–0. Drive: 13 plays, 97 yards, 6:49.

Third quarter

- TTU – KeSean Carter 3-yard pass from Henry Colombi (Trey Wolff kick), 8:05. Wildcats 14–7. Drive: 18 plays, 88 yards, 6:55.
- KSU – Blake Lynch 28-yard field goal, 3:34. Wildcats 17–7. Drive: 11 plays, 55 yards, 4:26.
- TTU – Xavier White 49-yard run (Trey Wolff kick), 2:14. Wildcats 17–14. Drive: 4 plays, 84 yards, 1:14.

Fourth quarter

- TTU – Myles Price 13-yard pass from Henry Colombi (Trey Wolff kick), 11:11. Red Raiders 21–17. Drive: 7 plays, 74 yards, 2:21.
- KSU – Harry Trotter 4-yard run (Blake Lynch kick), 10:00. Wildcats 24–21. Drive: 3 plays, 75 yards, 1:11.
- KSU – Deuce Vaughn 70-yard pass from Will Howard (Blake Lynch kick), 2:07. Wildcats 31–21. Drive: 6 plays, 88 yards, 1:35.

Statistics	TTU	KSU
First downs	27	20
Total yards	471	404
Rushing yards	204	198
Passing yards	267	206
Turnovers	1	0
Time of possession	31:39	28:21

Team	Category	Player	Statistics
Texas Tech	Passing	Henry Colombi	30/42, 244 yards, 2 TD, INT
Texas Tech	Rushing	Xavier White	12 rushes, 113 yards, TD
Texas Tech	Receiving	Erik Ezukanma	5 receptions, 77 yards
Kansas State	Passing	Will Howard	7/12, 173 yards, TD
Kansas State	Rushing	Deuce Vaughn	16 rushes, 113 yards, TD
Kansas State	Receiving	Deuce Vaughn	3 receptions, 81 yards, TD

=== At No. 24 Iowa State ===
Texas Tech Red Raiders at No. 24 Iowa State Cyclones – Game summary

Quarter	1	2	3	4	Total
Red Raiders	7	0	0	8	15
No. 24 Cyclones	7	14	7	3	31

at Jack Trice Stadium, Ames, Iowa

- Date: October 10
- Game time: 2:30 p.m. CDT
- Game weather: Temperature: 75 °F (24 °C) • weather: clear • wind: NE 5-10 MPH
- Game attendance: 13,502
- Referee: Kevin Hassell
- TV announcers (ABC): Mark Jones and Dusty Dvoracek
- Box score, Recap

Game information

First quarter

- TTU – Zech McPhearson 90-yard blocked kick return (Trey Wolff kick), 8:00. Red Raiders 7–0.
- ISU – Breece Hall 11-yard run (Connor Assalley kick), 4:31. Tied 7–7. Drive: 8 plays, 68 yards, 3:22.

Second quarter

- ISU – Chase Allen 2-yard pass from Brock Purdy (Connor Assalley kick), 14:23. Cyclones 14–7. Drive: 9 plays, 62 yards, 3:59.
- ISU – Breece Hall 1-yard run (Connor Assalley kick), 5:31. Cyclones 21–7. Drive: 13 plays, 80 yards, 6:09.

Third quarter

- ISU – Charlie Kolar 13-yard pass from Brock Purdy (Connor Assalley kick), 3:06. Cyclones 28–7. Drive: 11 plays, 67 yards, 4:23.

Fourth quarter

- ISU – Connor Assalley 26-yard field goal, 12:07. Cyclones 31–7. Drive: 11 plays, 67 yards, 4:23.
- TTU – Erik Ezukanma 18-yard pass from Henry Colombi (White run), 4:54. Cyclones 31–15. Drive: 12 plays, 88 yards, 3:41.

Statistics	TTU	ISU
First downs	15	29
Total yards	270	516
Rushing yards	58	214
Passing yards	212	302
Turnovers	0	1
Time of possession	19:09	40:51

Team	Category	Player	Statistics
Texas Tech	Passing	Henry Colombi	10/12, 115 yards, TD
Texas Tech	Rushing	Xavier White	7 rushes, 21 yards
Texas Tech	Receiving	Erik Ezukanma	5 receptions, 61 yards, TD
Iowa State	Passing	Brock Purdy	32/43, 302 yards, 2 TD
Iowa State	Rushing	Breece Hall	27 rushes, 135 yards, 2 TD
Iowa State	Receiving	Xavier Hutchinson	9 receptions, 77 yards

=== West Virginia ===
West Virginia Mountaineers at Texas Tech Red Raiders – Game summary

Quarter	1	2	3	4	Total
Mountaineers	7	6	14	0	27
Red Raiders	13	7	7	7	34

at Jones AT&T Stadium, Lubbock, Texas

- Date: October 24
- Game time: 4:30 p.m. CDT
- Game weather: Temperature: 65 °F (18 °C) • weather: clear • wind: SSW 17 MPH
- Game attendance: 13,532
- Referee: Brandon Cruse
- TV announcers (ESPN2): Anish Shroff, Tom Luginbill and Ian Fitzsimmons
- Box score, Recap

Game information

First quarter

- TTU – Henry Colombi 1-yard run (Trey Wolff kick), 9:29. Red Raiders 7–0. Drive: 10 plays, 69 yards, 4:08.
- WVU – Leddie Brown 3-yard run (Evan Staley kick), 7:41. Tied 7–7. Drive: 5 plays, 75 yards, 1:46.
- TTU – SaRodorick Thompson 48-yard run (kick failed), 1:35. Red Raiders 13–7. Drive: 3 plays, 61 yards, 1:11.

Second quarter

- WVU – Evan Staley 41-yard field goal, 9:00. Red Raiders 13–10. Drive: 7 plays, 42 yards, 3:02.
- TTU – Trey Cleveland 11-yard pass from Henry Colombi (Trey Wolff kick), 2:36. Red Raiders 20–10. Drive: 13 plays, 75 yards, 6:24.
- WVU – Evan Staley 45-yard field goal, 0:00. Red Raiders 20–13. Drive: 12 plays, 47 yards, 2:36.

Third quarter

- WVU – T.J. Banks 2-yard pass from Jarret Doege (Evan Staley kick), 13:41. Tied 20–20. Drive: 3 plays, 24 yards, 1:07.
- TTU – Tahj Brooks 5-yard run (Trey Wolff kick), 10:05. Red Raiders 27–20. Drive: 9 plays, 73 yards, 3:36.
- WVU – Leddie Brown 1-yard run (Evan Staley kick), 6:00. Tied 27–27. Drive: 10 plays, 65 yards, 4:05.

Fourth quarter

- TTU – Zech McPhearson 56-yard fumble return (Trey Wolff kick), 8:44. Red Raiders 34–27.

Statistics	WVU	TTU
First downs	22	18
Total yards	438	348
Rushing yards	91	179
Passing yards	347	169
Turnovers	1	1
Time of possession	30:07	29:53

Team	Category	Player	Statistics
West Virginia	Passing	Jarret Doege	32/50, 347 yards, TD
West Virginia	Rushing	Leddie Brown	21 rushes, 77 yards, 2 TD
West Virginia	Receiving	Winston Wright Jr.	9 receptions, 126 yards
Texas Tech	Passing	Henry Colombi	22/28, 169 yards, TD
Texas Tech	Rushing	SaRodorick Thompson	8 rushes, 68 yards, TD
Texas Tech	Receiving	Myles Price	7 receptions, 79 yards

=== No. 24 Oklahoma ===
No. 24 Oklahoma Sooners at Texas Tech Red Raiders – Game summary

Quarter	1	2	3	4	Total
No. 24 Sooners	21	27	7	7	62
Red Raiders	7	7	0	14	28

at Jones AT&T Stadium, Lubbock, Texas

- Date: October 31
- Game time: 7:00 p.m. CDT
- Game weather: Temperature: 70 °F (21 °C) • weather: partly cloudy • wind: N 8 MPH
- Game attendance: 14,431
- Referee: Scott Campbell
- TV announcers (Fox): Tim Brando and Spencer Tillman
- Box score, Recap

Game information

First quarter

- TTU – SaRodorick Thompson 5-yard run (Trey Wolff kick), 12:20. Red Raiders 7–0. Drive: 7 plays, 75 yards, 2:40.
- OKLA – Rhamondre Stevenson 6-yard run (Gabe Brkic kick), 5:31. Tied 7–7. Drive: 7 plays, 56 yards, 3:19.
- OKLA – T.J. Pledger 2-yard run (Gabe Brkic kick), 5:04. Sooners 14–7. Drive: 1 play, 9 yards, 0:10.
- OKLA – Rhamondre Stevenson 1-yard run (Gabe Brkic kick), 2:10. Sooners 21–7. Drive: 3 plays, 50 yards, 0:58.

Second quarter

- OKLA – Jeremiah Hall 4-yard pass from Spencer Rattler (Gabe Brkic kick), 14:06. Sooners 28–7. Drive: 5 plays, 25 yards, 2:36.
- OKLA – Austin Stogner 27-yard pass from Spencer Rattler (Gabe Brkic kick), 12:05. Sooners 35–7. Drive: 3 plays, 62 yards, 1:09.
- OKLA – Rhamondre Stevenson 1-yard run (Gabe Brkic kick), 6:28. Sooners 42–7. Drive: 6 plays, 80 yards, 3:24.
- TTU – Travis Koontz 75-yard pass from Henry Colombi (Trey Wolff kick), 6:15. Sooners 42–14. Drive: 1 play, 75 yards, 0:13.
- OKLA – Gabe Brkic 25-yard field goal, 1:42. Sooners 45–14. Drive: 6 plays, 42 yards, 2:56.
- OKLA – Gabe Brkic 35-yard field goal, 0:00. Sooners 48–14. Drive: 10 plays, 49 yards, 1:17.

Third quarter

- OKLA – Mikey Henderson 4-yard run (Gabe Brkic kick), 10:17. Sooners 55–14. Drive: 9 plays, 75 yards, 4:43.

Fourth quarter

- TTU – Ja'Lynn Polk 10-yard pass from Henry Colombi (Trey Wolff kick), 12:52. Sooners 55–21. Drive: 6 plays, 46 yards, 2:25.
- OKLA – Seth McGowan 14-yard run (Gabe Brkic kick), 7:51. Sooners 62–21. Drive: 9 plays, 75 yards, 5:01.
- TTU – Chadarius Townsend 36-yard run (Trey Wolff kick), 5:05. Sooners 62–28. Drive: 7 plays, 75 yards, 2:46.

Statistics	OKLA	TTU
First downs	29	18
Total yards	559	400
Rushing yards	213	134
Passing yards	346	266
Turnovers	0	3
Time of possession	36:23	23:37

Team	Category	Player	Statistics
Oklahoma	Passing	Spencer Rattler	21/30, 288 yards, 2 TD
Oklahoma	Rushing	Rhamondre Stevenson	13 rushes, 87 yards, 3 TD
Oklahoma	Receiving	Theo Wease Jr.	5 receptions, 105 yards
Texas Tech	Passing	Henry Colombi	15/28, 227 yards, 2 TD, 2 INT
Texas Tech	Rushing	Chadarius Townsend	6 rushes, 68 yards, TD
Texas Tech	Receiving	Erik Ezukanma	7 receptions, 88 yards

=== At TCU ===
Texas Tech Red Raiders at TCU Horned Frogs – Game summary

Quarter	1	2	3	4	Total
Red Raiders	0	3	7	8	18
Horned Frogs	3	7	17	7	34

at Amon G. Carter Stadium, Fort Worth, Texas

- Date: November 7
- Game time: 2:30 p.m. CST
- Game weather: Temperature: 76 °F (24 °C) • Weather: Sunny • Wind: N 7 MPH
- Game attendance: 12,356
- Referee: Tuta Salaam
- TV announcers (FS1): Eric Collins and Ben Leber
- Box score, Recap

Game information

First quarter

- TCU – Griffin Kell 43-yard field goal, 9:48. Horned Frogs 3–0. Drive: 4 plays, 7 yards, 1:16.

Second quarter

- TCU – Max Duggan 3-yard run (Griffin Kell kick), 10:32. Horned Frogs 10–0. Drive: 8 plays, 39 yards, 3:31.
- TTU – Trey Wolff 40-yard field goal, 0:00. Horned Frogs 10–3. Drive: 8 plays, 24 yards, 1:52.

Third quarter

- TCU – Quentin Johnston 2-yard run (Griffin Kell kick), 9:47. Horned Frogs 17–3. Drive: 12 plays, 89 yards, 5:13.
- TTU – Ja'Lynn Polk 60-yard pass from Henry Colombi (Trey Wolff kick), 8:33. Horned Frogs 17–10. Drive: 3 plays, 75 yards, 1:14.
- TCU – Griffin Kell 37-yard field goal, 3:45. Horned Frogs 20–10. Drive: 4 plays, -6 yards, 1:46.
- TCU – Max Duggan 48-yard run (Griffin Kell kick), 0:38. Horned Frogs 27–10. Drive: 4 plays, 67 yards, 1:52.

Fourth quarter

- TTU – Erik Ezukanma 57-yard pass from Henry Colombi (Myles Price run), 11:47. Horned Frogs 27–18. Drive: 3 plays, 76 yards, 1:34.
- TCU – Max Duggan 81-yard run (Griffin Kell kick), 1:42. Horned Frogs 34–18. Drive: 3 plays, 80 yards, 1:02.

Statistics	TTU	TCU
First downs	15	14
Total yards	311	343
Rushing yards	77	270
Passing yards	234	73
Turnovers	1	1
Time of possession	25:28	34:32

Team	Category	Player	Statistics
Texas Tech	Passing	Henry Colombi	23/41, 234 yards, 2 TD, INT
Texas Tech	Rushing	Xavier White	6 rushes, 43 yards
Texas Tech	Receiving	Ja'Lynn Polk	2 receptions, 61 yards, TD
TCU	Passing	Max Duggan	11/23, 73 yards, INT
TCU	Rushing	Max Duggan	19 rushes, 154 yards, 3 TD
TCU	Receiving	Taye Barber	3 receptions, 27 yards

=== Baylor ===
Baylor Bears at Texas Tech Red Raiders – Game summary

Quarter	1	2	3	4	Total
Bears	7	6	10	0	23
Red Raiders	3	3	6	12	24

at Jones AT&T Stadium, Lubbock, Texas

- Date: November 14
- Game time: 3:00 p.m. CST
- Game weather: Windy• Temperature: 78°F
- Game attendance: 12,914
- Referee: David Alvarez
- TV announcers (FS1): Eric Collins and Ben Leber
- Box score, Recap

Game information

First quarter

- TTU – Jonathan Garibay 48-yard field goal, 9:15. Red Raiders 3–0. Drive: 9 plays, 29 yards, 3:19.
- BAY – Jalen Pitre 26-yard interception return (John Mayers kick), 0:55. Bears 7–3.

Second quarter

- BAY – John Mayers 22-yard field goal, 7:12. Bears 10–3. Drive: 14 plays, 61 yards, 6:45.
- TTU – Jonathan Garibay 28-yard field goal, 1:12. Bears 10–6. Drive: 15 plays, 65 yards, 6:00.
- BAY – John Mayers 48-yard field goal, 0:00. Bears 13–6. Drive: 6 plays, 32 yards, 1:12.

Third quarter

- BAY – Charlie Brewer 8-yard run (John Mayers kick), 11:04. Bears 20–6. Drive: 6 plays, 34 yards, 2:58.
- TTU – Tahj Brooks 1-yard run (kick blocked), 8:42. Bears 20–12. Drive: 5 plays, 36 yards, 1:07.
- BAY – John Mayers 23-yard field goal, 1:11. Bears 23–12. Drive: 12 plays, 62 yards, 3:59.

Fourth quarter

- TTU – Tahj Brooks 2-yard run (pass failed), 11:48. Bears 23–18. Drive: 5 plays, 41 yards, 1:27.
- TTU – Jonathan Garibay 46-yard field goal, 4:41. Bears 23–21. Drive: 9 plays, 56 yards, 3:40.
- TTU – Jonathan Garibay 25-yard field goal, 0:00. Red Raiders 24–23. Drive: 12 plays, 79 yards, 2:14.

Statistics	BAY	TTU
First downs	20	19
Total yards	360	381
Rushing yards	207	124
Passing yards	153	257
Turnovers	1	2
Time of possession	33:27	26:33

Team	Category	Player	Statistics
Baylor	Passing	Charlie Brewer	17/26, 153 yards, INT
Baylor	Rushing	Qualan Jones	21 rushes, 86 yards
Baylor	Receiving	R. J. Sneed II	4 receptions, 58 yards
Texas Tech	Passing	Alan Bowman	14/23, 181 yards, INT
Texas Tech	Rushing	SaRodorick Thompson	13 rushes, 69 yards
Texas Tech	Receiving	KeSean Carter	7 receptions, 64 yards

This is the first game between the Red Raiders and Bears to be played in Lubbock since the 2008 season.

The Red Raiders took an early 3–0 lead with a 48-yard field goal Jonathan Garibay, who was making his first collegiate start after struggles from incumbent starter Trey Wolff. The Bears would score the first touchdown of the game late in the quarter, with Jalen Pitre intercepting an Alan Bowman (who was in the series over starter Henry Colombi) pass and returning it 26-yards for a pick six touchdown. The rest of the half would be a defensive battle between the two teams, with Baylor's John Mayers making two field goals in the 2nd quarter (one from 22-yards and the other from 48-yards) and Garibay making a 28-yard attempt. At halftime, the Bears led 13–6.

The Bears would score the first offensive touchdown of the game, with a 5-yard run from quarterback Charlie Brewer. Texas Tech responded on its next possession with a 1-yard run from Tahj Brooks, but Garibay's point-after-attempt was blocked. The last score of the third quarter would be a 23-yard field goal from Mayers. Trailing 12–23 enter the 4th quarter, the Red Raiders scored 12 unanswered points while shutting out the Bears completely. On the last drive of the game, Bowman, who was in for an injured Colombi, marched the offense down the field to the Baylor 7-yard line. Garibay kicked the game-winning 25-yard field goal as time expired to give Texas Tech the 24–23 victory.

=== At No. 23 Oklahoma State ===
Texas Tech Red Raiders at No. 23 Oklahoma State Cowboys – Game summary

Quarter	1	2	3	4	Total
Red Raiders	7	10	14	13	44
No. 23 Cowboys	7	14	20	9	50

at Boone Pickens Stadium, Stillwater, Oklahoma

- Date: November 28
- Game time: 11:00 a.m.
- Game weather: Temperature: 46 °F (8 °C) • Weather: cloudy • Wind: W 3 MPH
- Game attendance: 14,645
- Referee: Brandon Cruse
- TV announcers (Fox): Joe Davis and Mark Helfrich
- Box score, Recap

Game information

First quarter

- TTU – SaRodorick Thompson 59-yard run (Jonathan Garibay kick), 7:01. Red Raiders 7–0. Drive: 8 plays, 80 yards, 3:00.
- OKST – Dezmon Jackson 1-yard run (Brady Pohl kick), 4:19. Tied 7–7. Drive: 8 plays, 79 yards, 2:42.

Second quarter

- OKST – Dezmon Jackson 7-yard run (Brady Pohl kick), 11:54. Cowboys 14–7. Drive: 6 plays, 61 yards, 1:21.
- TTU – SaRodorick Thompson 24-yard run (Jonathan Garibay kick), 9:33. Tied 14–14. Drive: 7 plays, 85 yards, 2:21.
- OKST – Dezmon Jackson 7-yard run (Brady Pohl kick), 6:22. Cowboys 21–14. Drive: 10 plays, 75 yards, 3:11.
- TTU – Jonathan Garibay 44-yard field goal, 2:28. Cowboys 21–17. Drive: 4 plays, 6 yards, 1:32.

Third quarter

- TTU – Erik Ezukanma 48-yard pass from Alan Bowman (Jonathan Garibay kick), 7:15. Red Raiders 24–21. Drive: 4 plays, 73 yards, 1:49.
- OKST – Jason Taylor II 48-yard kick return (Brady Pohl kick), 7:09. Cowboys 28–24.
- OKST – Tre Sterling 65-yard interception return (kick failed), 3:23. Cowboys 34–24.
- TTU – Xavier White 70-yard run (Jonathan Garibay kick), 2:23. Cowboys 34–31. Drive: 2 plays, 75 yards, 0:51.
- OKST – Tylan Wallace 27-yard pass from Spencer Sanders (Brady Pohl kick), 1:22. Cowboys 41–31. Drive: 3 plays, 73 yards, 1:10.

Fourth quarter

- OKST – Spencer Sanders 9-yard run (Brady Pohl kick), 9:44. Cowboys 48–31. Drive: 5 plays, 50 yards, 1:29.
- OKST – Alan Bowman penalized in end zone, 8:50. Cowboys 50–31.
- TTU – Erik Ezukanma 32-yard pass from Alan Bowman (pass failed), 3:57. Cowboys 50–37. Drive: 10 plays, 90 yards, 2:37.
- TTU – Loic Fouonji 31-yard pass from Alan Bowman (Jonathan Garibay kick), 1:51. Cowboys 50–44. Drive: 8 plays, 59 yards, 1:46.

Statistics	TTU	OKST
First downs	26	29
Total yards	639	539
Rushing yards	255	317
Passing yards	384	222
Turnovers	3	3
Time of possession	29:30	30:30

Team	Category	Player	Statistics
Texas Tech	Passing	Alan Bowman	31/46, 384 yards, 3 TD, INT
Texas Tech	Rushing	SaRodorick Thompson	17 rushes, 133 yards, 2 TD
Texas Tech	Receiving	Erik Ezukanma	7 receptions, 183 yards, 2 TD
Oklahoma State	Passing	Spencer Sanders	19/31, 222 yards, TD, INT
Oklahoma State	Rushing	Dezmon Jackson	36 rushes, 235 yards, 3 TD
Oklahoma State	Receiving	Tylan Wallace	7 receptions, 129 yards, TD

=== Kansas ===
Kansas Jayhawks at Texas Tech Red Raiders – Game summary

Quarter	1	2	3	4	Total
Jayhawks	0	3	3	7	13
Red Raiders	10	0	3	3	16

at Jones AT&T Stadium, Lubbock, Texas

- Date: December 5
- Game time: 11:00 a.m.
- Game weather: Temperature: 44 °F (7 °C) • Weather: cloudy • Wind: N 10 MPH
- Game attendance: 9,877
- Referee: David Alvarez
- TV announcers (FS2): Guy Haberman and Charles Arbuckle
- Box score

Game information

First quarter

- TTU – Jonathan Garibay 47-yard field goal, 8:56. Red Raiders 3–0. Drive: 8 plays, 35 yards, 1:47.
- TTU – Myles Price 70-yard run (Jonathan Garibay kick), 3:52. Red Raiders 10–0. Drive: 3 plays, 82 yards, 0:49.

Second quarter

- KU – Jacob Borcila 42-yard field goal, 0:00. Red Raiders 10–3. Drive: 14 plays, 53 yards, 4:53.

Third quarter

- TTU – Jonathan Garibay 21-yard field goal, 6:59. Red Raiders 13–3. Drive: 14 plays, 36 yards, 5:17.
- KU – Jacob Borcila 29-yard field goal, 0:27. Red Raiders 13–6. Drive: 4 plays, 5 yards, 1:44.

Fourth quarter

- KU – Daniel Hishaw Jr. 12-yard run (Jacob Borcila kick), 10:46. Tied 13–13. Drive: 7 plays, 44 yards, 2:18.
- TTU – Jonathan Garibay 36-yard field goal, 5:36. Red Raiders 16–13. Drive: 10 plays, 52 yards, 5:10.

Statistics	KU	TTU
First downs	14	17
Total yards	214	410
Rushing yards	112	293
Passing yards	102	117
Turnovers	0	4
Time of possession	34:23	25:37

Team	Category	Player	Statistics
Kansas	Passing	Miles Kendrick	17/29, 102 yards
Kansas	Rushing	Daniel Hishaw Jr.	22 rushes, 87 yards, TD
Kansas	Receiving	Luke Grimm	6 receptions, 41 yards
Texas Tech	Passing	Alan Bowman	15/26, 117 yards, INT
Texas Tech	Rushing	Xavier White	14 rushes, 135 yards
Texas Tech	Receiving	Myles Price	2 receptions, 43 yards

On the Thursday before the game, head coach Matt Wells tested positive for COVID-19. Wells handled coaching duties remotely while defensive coordinator Keith Patterson served as the team's head coach for the game.

The Red Raiders committed four turnovers and missed three field goals during the game, while the Jayhawks committed no turnovers, but failed three 4th down conversions and only had 214 yards of total offense compared to Texas Tech's 410 yards.

== Statistics ==
=== Scoring ===
Scores against all opponents

	1	2	3	4	OT	Total
Opponents	79	101	98	78	7	363
Texas Tech	68	51	79	87	0	285

== Weekly awards ==
- Big 12 Defensive Player of the Week

Krishon Merriweather (week 1 vs. Houston Baptist)

- Big 12 Special Teams Player of the Week

Jonathan Garibay (week 10 vs. Baylor)

- Big 12 Newcomer of the Week

Colin Schooler (week 10 vs. Baylor)

== Players drafted into the NFL ==
Round	Pick	Player	Position	NFL Club
4	123	Zech McPhearson	CB	Philadelphia Eagles
7	236	Jack Anderson	OG	Buffalo Bills
