= Erik Ezukanma =

American football player (born 2000)

No. 82 – Philadelphia Eagles
- Position: Wide receiver
- Roster status: Practice squad

Personal information
- Born: January 25, 2000 (age 26); Fort Worth, Texas, U.S.
- Listed height: 6 ft 2 in (1.88 m)
- Listed weight: 206 lb (93 kg)

Career information
- High school: Timber Creek (Fort Worth)
- College: Texas Tech (2018–2021)
- NFL draft: 2022: 4th round, 125th overall pick

Career history
- Miami Dolphins (2022–2024); Jacksonville Jaguars (2025)*; DC Defenders (2026); Philadelphia Eagles (2026–present)*
- * Offseason or practice squad member only

Awards and highlights
- First-team All-Big 12 (2020); Second-team All-Big 12 (2021)

Career NFL statistics as of 2024
- Receptions: 1
- Receiving yards: 3
- Stats at Pro Football Reference

Chukwuerika "Erik" Ezukanma (/ɛzuˈkɑːnmə/ ezz-oo-KAHN-mə; born January 25, 2000) is an American professional football wide receiver for the Philadelphia Eagles of the National Football League (NFL). He played college football for the Texas Tech Red Raiders.

== Early life ==
Ezukanma attended Timber Creek High School in Fort Worth, Texas. In 2015, as a sophomore, he was a second-team all-district selection. The next year, Ezukanma was an AP 6A first-team all-state selection and was named the District 3-6A Offensive MVP. Ezukanma finished his senior season with 37 receptions for 687 yards and nine touchdowns.

On December 20, 2017, Ezukanma signed his letter of intent for Texas Tech as a 4-star recruit.

== College career ==
Ezukanma saw limited playing during his freshman season, appearing in only two games. He caught his first collegiate touchdown from Colt Garret in the Red Raiders' game against Lamar.

Ezukanma was added to the watch list for the Fred Biletnikoff Award in the middle of the 2020 season. On November 28, against Oklahoma State, Ezukanma finished with seven receptions for a career high 183 yards along with two touchdowns. At the end of the season, Ezukanma was named first-team All-Big 12 Conference.

Coming into the 2021 season, Ezukanma was included on the preseason watch list for the Maxwell Award and the Fred Biletnikoff Award. He was also selected to the preseason first-team All-Big 12. Ezukanma broke his arm in the spring prior to the season, but was able to play in the team's season opener against Houston, finishing the game with seven receptions for 179 yards. After the conclusion of the regular season, Ezukanma was named second-team All-Big 12.

On December 23, 2021, Ezukanma announced that he would declare for the NFL draft.

=== Statistics ===
Season	Team	GP	Receiving				Rushing			
Season	Team	GP	Rec	Yds	Avg	TD	Att	Yds	Avg	TD
2018	Texas Tech	2	2	48	24.0	1	0	0	0.0	0
2019	Texas Tech	11	42	664	15.8	4	0	0	0.0	0
2020	Texas Tech	10	46	748	16.3	6	0	0	0.0	0
2021	Texas Tech	11	48	705	14.7	4	10	138	13.8	2
Career		34	138	2,165	15.7	15	10	138	13.8	2

== Professional career ==
Pre-draft measurables
Height	Weight	Arm length	Hand span	Wingspan	40-yard dash	10-yard split	20-yard split	20-yard shuttle	Three-cone drill	Vertical jump	Broad jump	Bench press
6 ft 1 7/8 in (1.88 m)	209 lb (95 kg)	33 1/2 in (0.85 m)	9 3/8 in (0.24 m)	6 ft 6 1/4 in (1.99 m)	4.55 s	1.57 s	2.59 s	4.38 s	7.20 s	36.5 in (0.93 m)	10 ft 6 in (3.20 m)	10 reps
All values from NFL Combine/Pro Day

=== Miami Dolphins ===
Ezukanma was selected by the Miami Dolphins in the fourth round (125 overall) of the 2022 NFL draft. Ezukanma made his NFL debut in Week 18 against the New York Jets, recording his first career catch on a three–yard reception from Skylar Thompson.

He was placed on the reserve/non-football injury on September 29, 2023.

On August 27, 2024, Ezukanma was waived by the Dolphins and re-signed to the practice squad. He was promoted to the active roster on December 28.

On August 26, 2025, Ezukanma was waived by the Dolphins as part of final roster cuts.

=== Jacksonville Jaguars ===
On August 28, 2025, Ezukanma was signed to the Jacksonville Jaguars' practice squad. He was released on October 7.

=== DC Defenders ===
On February 7, 2026, Ezukanma signed with the DC Defenders of the United Football League (UFL).

=== Philadelphia Eagles ===
On June 16, 2026, Ezukanma signed with the Philadelphia Eagles. He was waived by Philadelphia as a part of final roster cuts on August 30. On October 7, Ezukanma was signed to the practice squad.

== Personal life ==
Ezukanma is the son of Lawrette Ezukanma. He is one of seven siblings.
