= Alan Bowman (American football) =

American football player (born 2000)

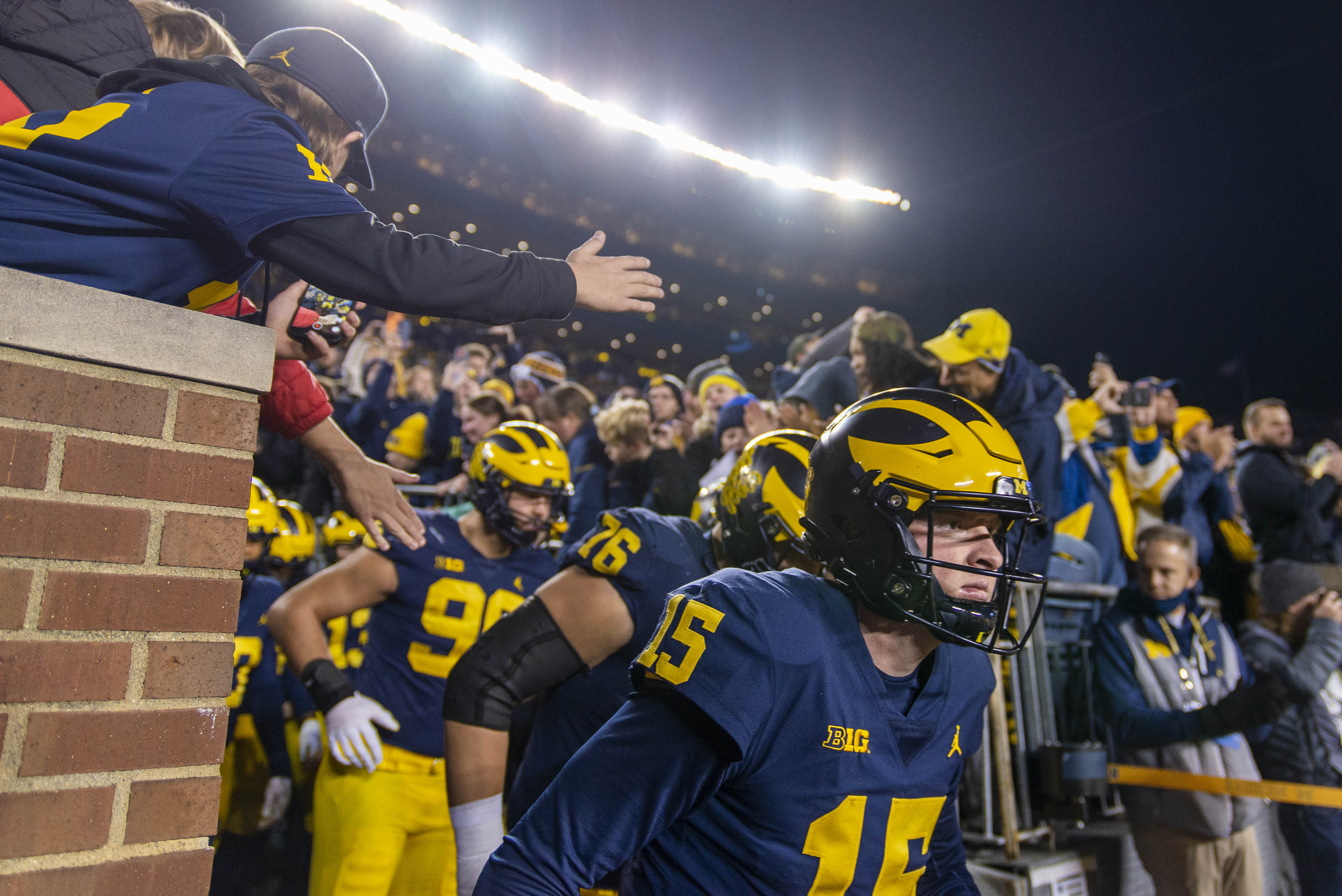
- Bowman (#15) with the Michigan Wolverines in 2021

Profile
- Position: Quarterback

Personal information
- Born: March 6, 2000 (age 26); Grapevine, Texas, U.S.
- Listed height: 6 ft 2 in (1.88 m)
- Listed weight: 220 lb (100 kg)

Career information
- High school: Grapevine
- College: Texas Tech (2018–2020); Michigan (2021–2022); Oklahoma State (2023–2024)

Career history
- Michigan Panthers (2025); San Antonio Brahmas (2025)

Alan Bowman (born March 6, 2000) is an American professional football quarterback. He played college football for the Texas Tech Red Raiders, Michigan Wolverines and Oklahoma State Cowboys.

== Early life ==
Bowman attended Grapevine High School in Grapevine, Texas. As a junior, Bowman was elected the District 8-5A Overall MVP in 2016. In his senior year, Bowman threw for 3,570 yards and 38 touchdowns. He was rated as a three star recruit by both 247Sports.com and Rivals.com. Bowman committed to Texas Tech on June 15, 2017 over schools such as Ole Miss, Arkansas, Missouri and Houston.

== College career ==
=== Texas Tech ===
Bowman entered his freshman year at Texas Tech in 2018 in a three-way battle for the starting position against junior McLane Carter and sophomore Jett Duffey, with Carter being named the starter for the week 1 game against the Ole Miss Rebels. Bowman entered the game in the 2nd quarter after Carter suffered a high ankle sprain. Bowman went 29/49 for 273 yards with a touchdown in the 27–47 loss. Bowman was named the starter for the week 2 match-up against the Lamar Cardinals, completing 22-of-25 passes for 282 yards with 2 touchdowns, only playing the first half of the game. A week later on September 15, Bowman had a historic game against the Houston Cougars, completing 43-of-59 passes for 605 yards with five touchdowns in the 63–49 win. Bowman's 605 yards set a Big 12 record for most passing yards in a game by a freshman. On September 29 against the West Virginia Mountaineers, Bowman left the game right before halftime after being sandwiched between two defenders with an apparent upper-body injury; it was later revealed that Bowman had suffered a partially collapsed lung. Bowman returned from injury on October 20 for the Red Raiders' game against the Kansas Jayhawks; Bowman finished 36/46 for 408 yards with three touchdowns and an interception. On November 3 against the Oklahoma Sooners, Bowman left the game at halftime for an unknown reason. It was later revealed that he had a re-occurrence of a partially collapsed lung; Bowman was discharged from the hospital on November 7. Bowman finished his freshman year with 227 completions out of 327 attempts for 2,638 yards with 17 touchdowns and 7 interceptions.

Bowman started in Texas Tech's first game of the 2019 season against the Montana State Bobcats, his first game since November 3, 2018. Bowman played most of the game, completing 40 passes out of 53 attempts for 436 yards with two touchdowns along with a rushing touchdown in the 45–10 victory. On September 14, Bowman suffered a shoulder injury against the Arizona Wildcats and was expected to be out for several weeks. Bowman redshirted on November 11 after being cleared to play again.

In the third game of the 2020 season, Bowman left during the 1st quarter against the Kansas State Wildcats with an apparent leg injury; Bowman finished the game 4-of-7 for 23 yards. Bowman returned from injury and started the next game against the no. 24 Iowa State Cyclones. Bowman struggled in the game and was benched in favor of Utah State transfer Henry Colombi, who was later named the team's starter moving forward. On November 14 against the Baylor Bears, Bowman played one series that ended with him throwing a pick six. Bowman would enter the game again in the 3rd quarter after Colombi suffered an injury to his non-throwing arm; the Red Raiders were down 6–20 when Bowman entered. Bowman would lead Texas Tech back in the game, leading the team on three scoring drives in the second half that resulted in a 24–23 victory for the Red Raiders.

=== Michigan ===
On February 28, 2021, Bowman announced that he would be transferring to Michigan for the upcoming season. Prior to the 2021 season, redshirt sophomore Cade McNamara was named Michigan's starting quarterback, beating out Bowman and five-star freshman J. J. McCarthy. Bowman appeared in the team's game against the Wisconsin Badgers, the fourth quarterback Michigan used in the game, throwing an interception.

=== Oklahoma State ===
On January 9, 2023, Bowman transferred to Oklahoma State.

On December 16, 2024, following a lackluster performance and season, Bowman declared for the 2025 NFL draft.

=== Statistics ===
Year	Team	Games			Passing								Rushing				Receiving			
Year	Team	GP	GS	Record	Cmp	Att	Pct	Yds	Y/A	TD	Int	Rtg	Att	Yds	Avg	TD	Rec	Yds	Avg	TD
2018	Texas Tech	8	7	4–3	227	327	69.4	2,638	8.1	17	7	150.1	29	−26	−0.9	1	1	10	10.0	0
2019	Texas Tech	3	3	2–1	101	154	65.6	1,020	6.6	6	3	130.2	7	14	2.0	1	0	0	0.0	0
2020	Texas Tech	8	6	2–4	150	232	64.7	1,602	6.9	10	7	130.8	10	3	0.3	0	0	0	0.0	0
2021	Michigan	3	0	0–0	2	4	50.0	9	2.3	0	1	18.9	0	0	0.0	0	0	0	0.0	0
2022	Michigan	3	0	0–0	6	7	85.7	60	8.6	1	0	204.9	0	0	0.0	0	0	0	0.0	0
2023	Oklahoma State	14	13	9–4	304	501	60.7	3,460	6.2	15	14	123.0	26	24	0.9	2	1	3	3.0	0
2024	Oklahoma State	11	9	3–6	204	340	60.0	2,423	7.1	16	12	128.3	24	−38	−1.6	0	1	11	11.0	1
Career		50	38	20–18	994	1,565	63.5	11,212	7.2	65	44	131.8	96	−23	−0.2	4	3	24	8.0	1

== Professional career ==
Pre-draft measurables
Height	Weight	Arm length	Hand span	40-yard dash	10-yard split	20-yard split	20-yard shuttle	Three-cone drill
6 ft 2 in (1.88 m)	220 lb (100 kg)	31 in (0.79 m)	9 7/8 in (0.25 m)	5.00 s	1.75 s	2.83 s	4.54 s	7.37 s
All values from Pro Day

=== Michigan Panthers ===
On April 15, 2025, prior to the 2025 NFL draft, Bowman signed with the Michigan Panthers of the United Football League (UFL). He was released by the Panthers on April 21.

=== San Antonio Brahmas ===
On May 21, 2025, Bowman signed with the San Antonio Brahmas of the United Football League (UFL).
