= Jett Duffey =

American football player

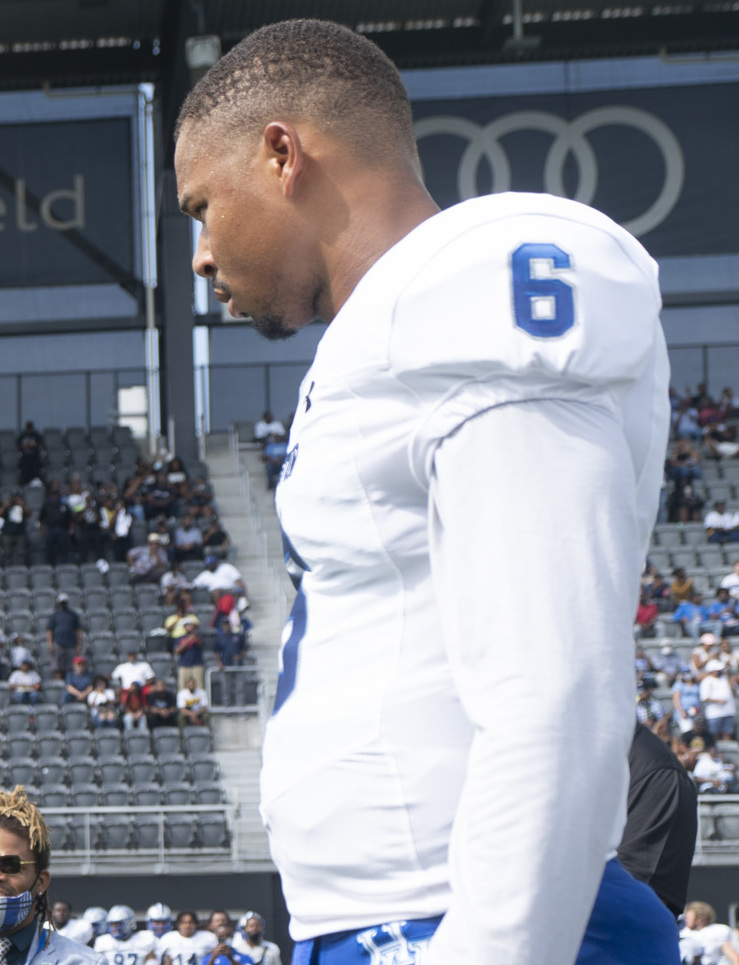
- Duffey with Hampton in 2021

Personal information
- Born: January 20, 1998 (age 28); Mansfield, Texas, U.S.
- Listed height: 6 ft 0 in (1.83 m)
- Listed weight: 205 lb (93 kg)

Career information
- High school: Lake Ridge (Mansfield, Texas)
- College: Texas Tech (2016–2019); Hampton (2020–2021)
- Stats at ESPN

Jett Duffey is an American former college football quarterback who played for the Hampton Pirates and Texas Tech Red Raiders.

== Early life ==
Duffey attended Lake Ridge High School in Mansfield, Texas. He finished his senior season with over 4,000 passing yards and 48 touchdowns and was awarded the Landry Award as the top player in the Dallas-Fort Worth metroplex and named Mr. Texas Football as the top player in the state for 2015. Duffey was rated as a three star recruit and the 14th best dual-threat quarterback by 247Sports.com; he was also rated as a three star recruit by Rivals.com. In addition to Texas Tech, Duffey received offers from Houston, Air Force, TCU, and Baylor.

== College career ==
=== Texas Tech ===
On May 13, 2015, it was announced that Duffey committed to playing college football at Texas Tech.

==== 2016 ====
Duffey was redshirted his first year at Texas Tech and did not play.

==== 2017 ====
Duffey was suspended from the team and university for spring and summer terms. Chris Cook, a spokesperson for Texas Tech, stated the suspension was imposed by the university and not the team. It was later revealed in April that Duffey was found responsible for two counts of sexual misconduct, violating Title IX policies. A grand jury found that there was not sufficient cause for a criminal prosecution. Duffey's suspension ended in August and he returned to the university and team.

Duffey only played one game in 2017, appearing late in the season opener against Eastern Washington. Duffey finished 2/2 for 16 yards along with 4 rushing attempts for 6 yards in the 56–10 victory.

==== 2018 ====
Duffey entered the 2018 season in a competition for the starting quarterback position against junior McLane Carter and freshman Alan Bowman. Carter would start in the season opener against Ole Miss but suffered a high ankle sprain in the 2nd quarter and was replaced by Bowman. Duffey played his first game of the season next week at home against Lamar in relief of Bowman, with Texas Tech up 42–0. He would finish 7/9 for 93 yards and an interception and led the team in rushing with 81 yards and a touchdown. On September 29 against West Virginia, Bowman suffered a partially collapsed lung late in the 2nd quarter with Duffey replacing him. The Red Raiders trailed 35–10 when Duffey entered the game and he led a comeback attempt, but threw a costly pick six in the 4th quarter with Texas Tech losing 34–42. Duffey would start the next game, against TCU, with Bowman still out due to injury. He would finish 13/24, for 190 yards, a touchdown, and an interception along with 83 yards rushing and a rushing touchdown in the 17–14 victory. Duffey's next start would be on November 10 against Texas. Duffey finished 37/47 for a career high 444 yards with 4 touchdowns, but also threw an interception and fumbled the ball twice in the 34–41 loss. Duffey would struggle the following week against Kansas State, finishing 19/27 for 150 yards with an interception. Duffey would finish the 2018 season as the team's leading rusher, rushing for 369 yards with 4 touchdowns.

==== 2019 ====
Duffey would enter the 2019 season as the third quarterback on Texas Tech's depth chart behind returning starter Alan Bowman and Rice transfer Jackson Tyner. Bowman suffered a left shoulder injury against Arizona with Tyner being named the Red Raiders' starting quarterback for the Oklahoma game. Tyner would be replaced by Duffey late in the first quarter after Tyner struggled. Duffey finished 11/20 for 120 yards in the 16–55 loss. Following the game, head coach Matt Wells announced that Duffey would be the team's starting quarterback. The following week, Duffey would lead the Red Raiders in a 45–35 upset victory over the no. 21 Oklahoma State Cowboys. Duffey had his second career 400-yard passing game, finishing 26/44 for 426 yards with 4 touchdowns, rushed for another touchdown and committed no turnovers. For his performance, Duffey received several weekly awards, including the Big 12 Offensive Player of the Week, the Maxwell Award Player of the Week, and the Davey O'Brien Quarterback of the Week.

On December 13, Duffey had entered the NCAA transfer portal.

=== Hampton ===
==== 2020 ====
On January 8, it was announced that Duffey would be transferring to Tulane. On January 10, he announced on Twitter he would open again his transfer and not go to Tulane. Over a week later, Duffey announced that he would be transferring to Central Michigan. However, Central Michigan denied Duffey admission after it was revealed a second Title IX complaint had been filed against him in 2019, though Texas Tech's investigation found Duffey to not be responsible for any misconduct. In July, Duffey enrolled at Hampton University, but shortly after his arrival there it was announced the school would be cancelling all fall sports for the upcoming semester due to the COVID-19 pandemic.

==== 2021 ====
In his first game for Hampton, against the Virginia Union Panthers, Duffey threw for 242 yards and two touchdowns as the Pirates won 42–28.

=== Statistics ===
| Year | Team | GP | Passing | | | | | | | | Rushing | | | | Receiving | | | |
| Year | Team | GP | Cmp | Att | Pct | Yds | Y/A | TD | Int | Rtg | Att | Yds | Avg | TD | Rec | Yds | Avg | TD |
|---|---|---|---|---|---|---|---|---|---|---|---|---|---|---|---|---|---|---|
| 2016 | Texas Tech | (redshirt) Redshirted | | | | | | | | | | | | | | | | |
| 2017 | Texas Tech | 1 | 2 | 2 | 100.0 | 16 | 8.0 | 0 | 0 | 167.2 | 4 | 6 | 1.5 | 0 | 0 | 0 | 0 | 0 |
| 2018 | Texas Tech | 7 | 104 | 154 | 67.5 | 1,221 | 7.9 | 8 | 6 | 143.5 | 79 | 369 | 4.7 | 4 | 0 | 0 | 0 | 0 |
| 2019 | Texas Tech | 10 | 239 | 367 | 65.1 | 2,840 | 7.7 | 18 | 5 | 143.6 | 72 | 212 | 2.9 | 1 | 1 | 14 | 14.0 | 0 |
| 2020 | Hampton | Season cancelled due to the COVID-19 pandemic | | | | | | | | | | | | | | | | |
| 2021 | Hampton | 11 | 174 | 296 | 58.8 | 2,547 | 8.6 | 15 | 12 | 139.7 | 116 | 439 | 3.8 | 10 | 0 | 0 | 0.0 | 0 |
| Career | | 29 | 519 | 819 | 63.4 | 6,624 | 8.1 | 41 | 23 | 142.2 | 271 | 1,026 | 3.8 | 15 | 1 | 14 | 14.0 | 0 |
