= Seth Collins =

American football player (born 1996)

No. 0
- Positions: Quarterback, wide receiver, defensive back

Personal information
- Born: October 10, 1996 (age 30); San Diego, California, U.S.
- Listed height: 6 ft 3 in (1.91 m)
- Listed weight: 191 lb (87 kg)

Career information
- High school: Granite Hills (El Cajon, California)
- College: Oregon State (2015–2017); Texas Tech (2018–2021)
- Stats at ESPN

Seth Collins (born October 10, 1996) is an American college football player who was a defensive back for the Oregon State Beavers and Texas Tech Football Texas Tech Red Raiders.

== Early life ==
Collins attended Christian High School San Diego in El Cajon, California, as a freshman and Helix High School in La Mesa, California, as a sophomore, before transferring to Granite Hills High School in El Cajon prior to his junior year. As a senior, he passed for 1,013 yards, rushed for 988 and accounted for 29 touchdowns. Collins committed to Oregon State University to play college football.

== College career ==
Collins was named Oregon State's starting quarterback as a true freshman in 2015. In his first career start he passed for 92 yards and two passing touchdowns and rushed for 152 yards on 17 carries. Prior to 2016 he switched to wide receiver. Collins suffered a shoulder injury during spring practices prior to the 2019 season, missing the entire season. After an appeal to the NCAA, Collins was granted a sixth year of eligibility and was able to play for the 2020 season. Prior to the 2020 season, Collins switched from wide receiver to defensive back. Collins suffered a shoulder injury against Iowa State on October 10 and was out for the remainder of the season.

=== Statistics ===
Year	Team	GP	Passing								Rushing				Receiving				Tackles		
Year	Team	GP	Cmp	Att	Pct	Yds	Y/A	TD	Int	Rtg	Att	Yds	Avg	TD	Rec	Yds	Avg	TD	Total	Solo	Ast
2015	Oregon State	8	84	161	52.2	936	5.8	6	4	108.3	108	580	5.4	8	0	0	0	0	1	1	0
2016	Oregon State	10	0	2	0.0	0	0.0	0	0	0.0	15	30	2.0	0	36	418	11.6	1	2	2	0
2017	Oregon State	3	0	0	0.0	0	0.0	0	0	0.0	5	14	2.8	0	12	130	10.8	1	0	0	0
2018	Texas Tech	12	1	2	50.0	10	5.0	0	0	92.0	2	6	3.0	0	32	317	9.9	2	2	2	0
2019	Texas Tech	Did not play due to injury																			
2020	Texas Tech	4	0	0	0.0	0	0.0	0	0	0.0	0	0	0	0	1	5	5.0	0	5	4	1
2021	Texas Tech	11	0	0	0.0	0	0.0	0	0	0.0	0	0	0	0	0	0	0.0	0	6	4	2
Career		48	85	165	51.5	946	5.7	6	4	106.8	130	630	4.8	8	81	870	10.7	4	16	13	3
