= T. J. Vasher =

American football player (born 1998)

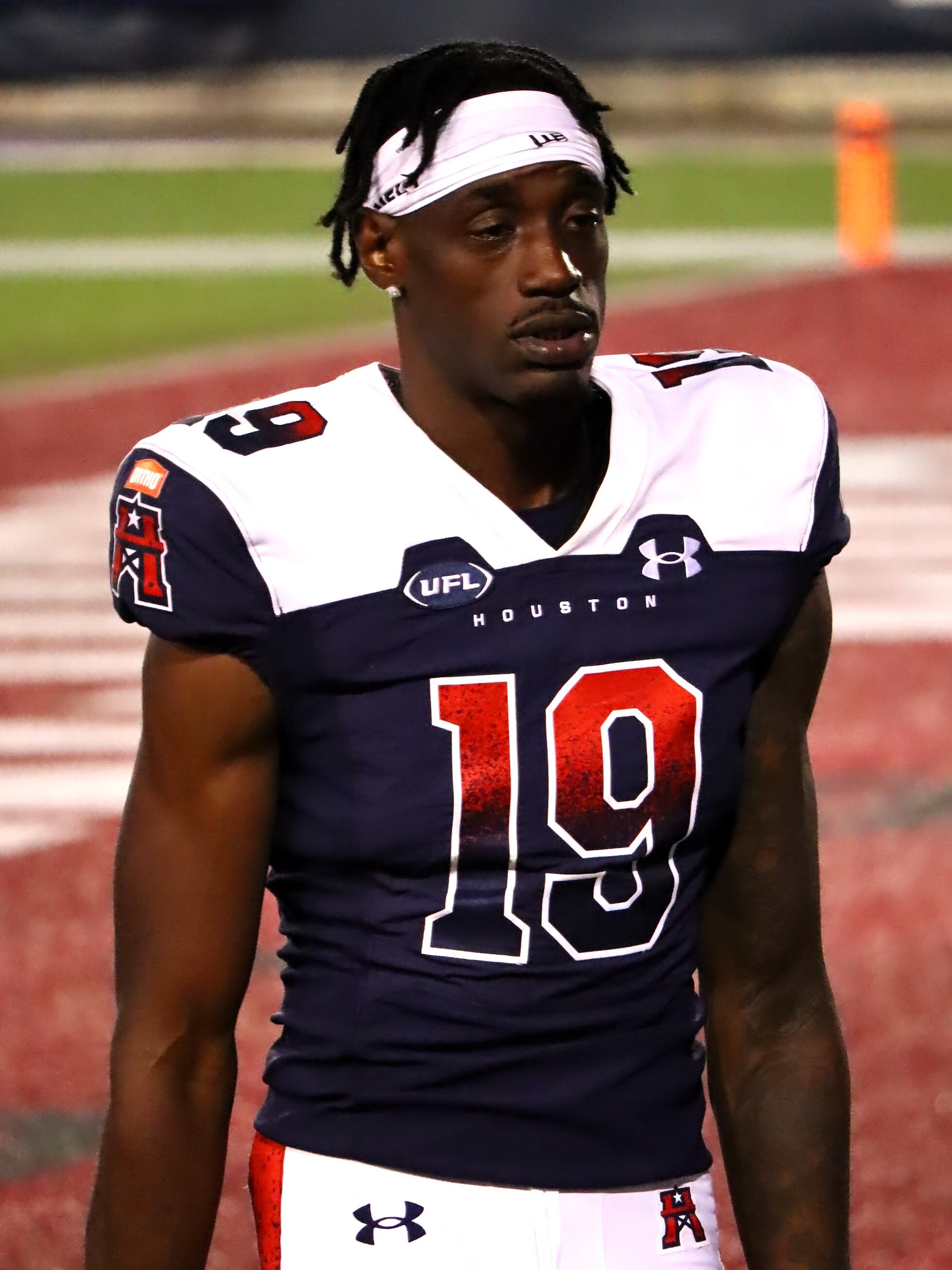
- Vasher with the Houston Roughnecks in 2025

Profile
- Position: Wide receiver

Personal information
- Born: August 29, 1998 (age 28); Wichita Falls, Texas, U.S.
- Listed height: 6 ft 6 in (1.98 m)
- Listed weight: 215 lb (98 kg)

Career information
- High school: S. H. Rider (Wichita Falls, Texas)
- College: Texas Tech (2016–2020)
- NFL draft: 2021: undrafted

Career history
- Dallas Cowboys (2021); San Antonio Brahmas (2023–2024); Hamilton Tiger-Cats (2024)*; Houston Roughnecks (2025)
- * Offseason or practice squad member only

Tariq J. "T.J." Vasher (born August 29, 1998) is an American football wide receiver. He played college football at Texas Tech.

== Early life ==
Vasher grew up in Wichita Falls, Texas, and attended S. H. Rider High School, where he played basketball and football. As a senior, Vasher had 1,169 receiving yards and nine touchdowns on 60 receptions and was named honorable mention Class 5A All-State and first-team Class 5A Dallas-Fort Worth All-Area.

He was rated a four-star recruit and committed to play college football at Texas Tech over offers from Ohio State, Mississippi and Mississippi State and also over offers to play college basketball at SMU, Tulsa and Boise State.

== College career ==
As a true freshman, Vasher caught two passes for nine yards in the season opener against Stephen F. Austin but suffered a season-ending injury and was granted a medical redshirt. He returned the following year and had 29 receptions for 545 yards and six touchdowns.

As a redshirt sophomore, Vasher had 54 receptions for 687 yards and seven touchdowns. He had 42 receptions for 515 yards and six touchdowns in his redshirt junior season. As a redshirt senior, Vasher played in seven games and finished the season with 19 catches for 227 yards and two touchdowns.

== Professional career ==
=== Dallas Cowboys ===
Vasher was signed as an undrafted free agent by the Dallas Cowboys after the 2021 NFL draft on May 14. On August 31, he was placed on the reserve/non-football injury list with a meniscus injury he suffered in college. He was waived on August 30, 2022.

=== San Antonio Brahmas ===
Vasher was selected by the XFL San Antonio Brahmas in the Group 1 ninth round (67th overall) of the 2023 XFL draft. He appeared in nine games with seven starts, making 16 receptions for 173 yards and two touchdowns. He re-signed with the team on February 1, 2024. He was released on April 8, 2024.

=== Hamilton Tiger-Cats ===
On May 6, 2024, Vasher signed with the Hamilton Tiger-Cats of the Canadian Football League (CFL). He was released on June 1.

=== Houston Roughnecks ===
On October 3, 2024, Vasher signed with the Houston Roughnecks of the United Football League (UFL).

== Personal life ==
Vasher's uncle, Nathan Vasher, is a former National Football League cornerback for the Chicago Bears.
