= New London Cenotaph =

Public memorial in New London, Texas, US

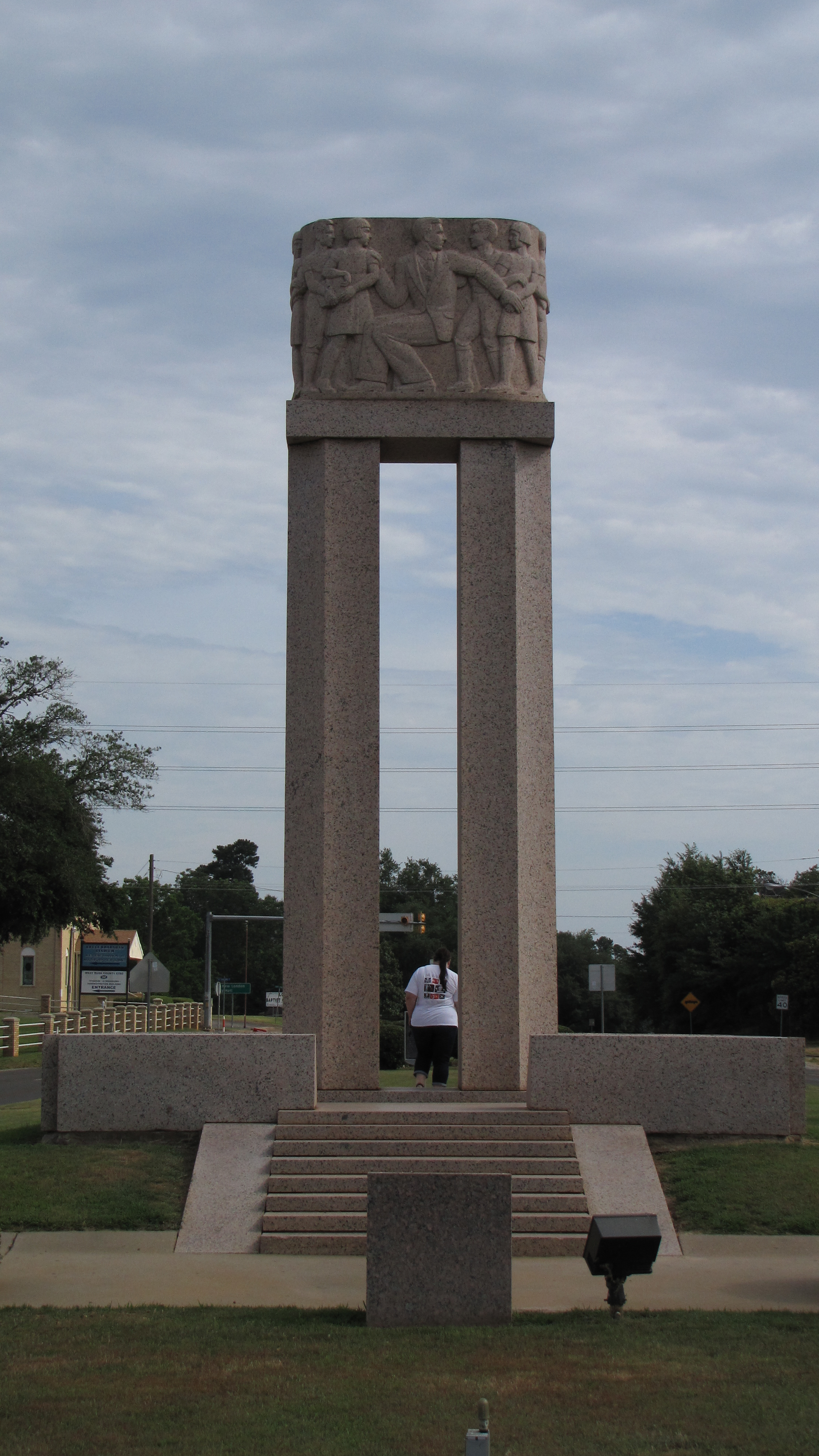
- The memorial in 2016
- Interactive map of New London Cenotaph
- Location: 690 Main Street; New London, Texas, United States
- Coordinates: 32°14′21″N 94°56′31″W
- Designer: Matchett Herring Coe (sculptor); Donald Nelson (architect)
- Type: Cenotaph
- Material: Granite
- Length: 18 feet (5.5 m)
- Width: 18 feet (5.5 m)
- Height: 36 feet (11 m)
- Beginning date: 1938
- Completion date: 1939
- Dedicated date: 1939
- Dedicated to: The people who died in the New London School explosion

The New London Cenotaph is a monument in New London, Texas, United States. The structure was constructed as a public memorial for the New London School explosion, a 1937 gas explosion that resulted in the deaths of about 300 people. It was designed by sculptor Matchett Herring Coe and architect Donald Nelson and dedicated in 1939.

The memorial, a cenotaph, is made of pink granite and consists of two columns supporting a large block that features sculptures of students and teachers in bas-relief. It is located near the site of the explosion, in the median of Texas State Highway 42 between a local history museum and a high school that was built on the site of the old school building. It serves as the site of memorial services held every year on March 18, the date of the disaster.

== Background ==
On March 18, 1937, a gas explosion occurred at the combined middle school and high school building in New London, Texas, United States. The explosion resulted in the deaths of about 300 people, (Note: Sources vary on the exact death toll from the explosion, with commonly cited figures of 294, 300, and 311. In a 2005 book, authors Betty Dooley Awbrey and Claude Dooley stated that the death toll was initially reported at 296, but grew to 311 as several individuals died due to injuries sustained in the explosion. Additionally, Mollie Ward, the director of a local history museum, reported a death toll of 319 based on death certificates issued after the explosion.) including 270 students. It was the deadliest disaster to occur at a school in American history, as well as one of the deadliest in East Texas history.

Following the disaster, fundraising drives took place in locales worldwide in order to assist the town and the affected families. The donations went to fund a memorial to those who died in the explosion, and a memorial association was formed to oversee further fundraising and coordinate plans. An architectural firm worked with community leaders on plans for this memorial, with a contract established in the second half of that year. Matchett Herring Coe served as a sculptor for the project, while Donald Nelson served as an architect, overseeing the overall design. Work on the memorial began in 1938 and was completed the following year, with it being erected in 1939. In total, the project cost $21,300 (equivalent to $481,000 in 2024). Schoolchildren, including those from the local community, donated a significant amount.

== Design ==
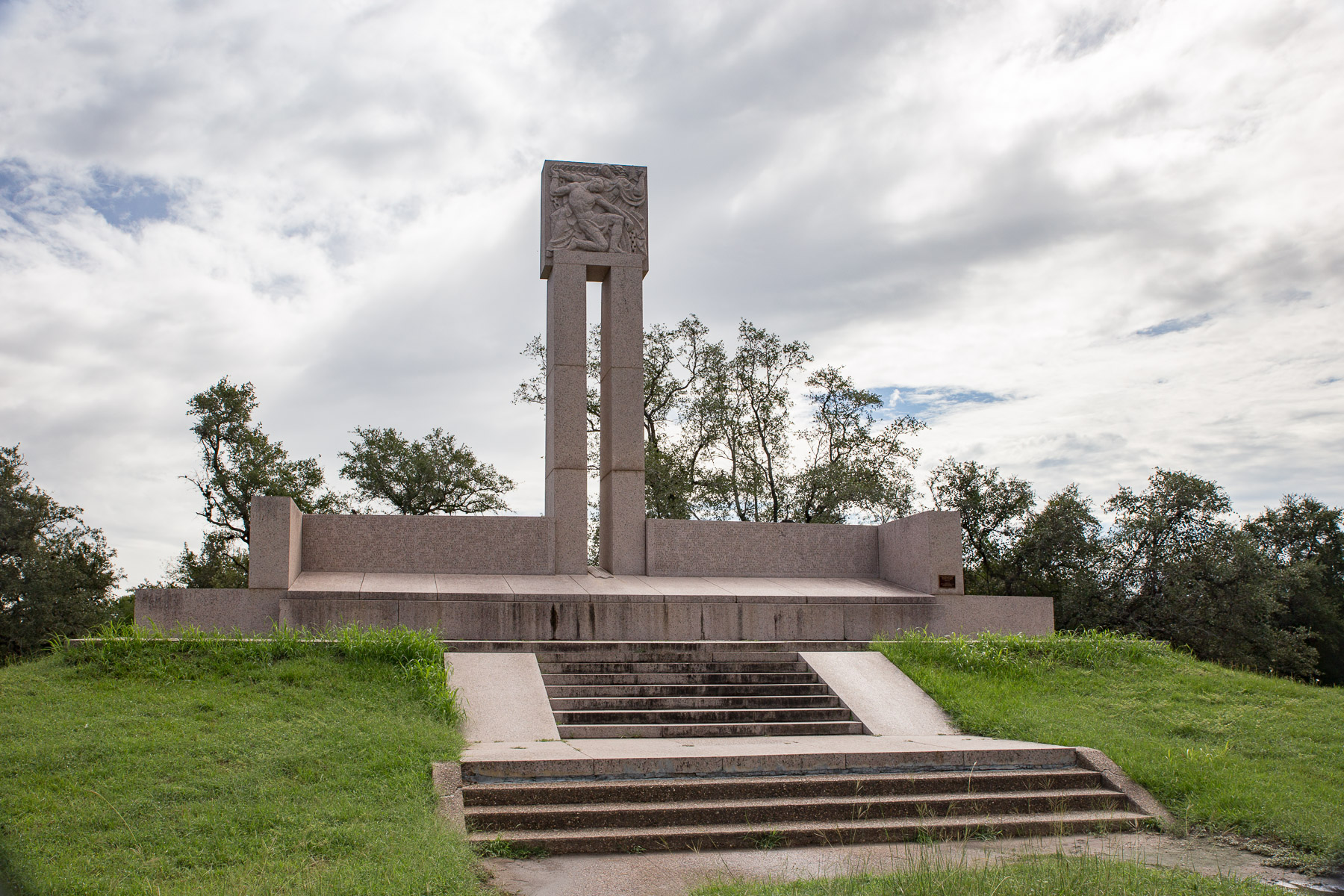
The memorial's design is similar to an earlier monument by Donald Nelson to commemorate the Goliad massacre (pictured 2018).

Concerning the general design, Nelson modeled it after a memorial that he had created in Goliad, Texas, to mark the hundredth anniversary of the 1836 Goliad massacre. It was built of pink granite, a material used in many memorials in Texas, as well as in the Texas State Capitol. The stone was quarried from the Premier Granite Quarry in Llano, Texas.

The structure consists of two columns, resting on a base surrounded by a short wall, supporting a large block. The base has length and width measurements of 18 feet (5.5 m) each and a height of 4 ft (1.2 m), with steps leading from the ground to the top of the base. The columns have a height of 20 ft (6.1 m) and have an octagonal cross-section. Both columns are fluted. The block atop the columns is also made of granite and weighs 20 short tons, with length, width, and height dimensions of 4 ft (1.2 m) by 4 ft (1.2 m) by 7 ft (2.1 m). It features a sculpture, in bas-relief, depicting 12 people—ten children and two teachers—in roughly life-size. In total, the monument weighs 120 short tons, with a total height of 36 ft (11 m). (Note: This value is derived from the dimensions given by the Smithsonian Institution Research Information System, which states that the "sculpture" portion of the monument has a height of 32 ft (9.8 m) and the "base" has a height of 4 ft (1.2 m). Multiple sources also give the overall height of the columns and block as 32 ft (9.8 m), while a 2012 history book on the school disaster gives a height of 34 ft (10 m).) On the front and back of the monument is the following inscription:

DEDICATED TO THE MEMORY OF THE / TWO HUNDRED AND NINETY-THREE / CHILDREN, TEACHERS AND VISITORS / WHO LOST THEIR LIVES IN THE LONDON / SCHOOL DISASTER OF MARCH THE / EIGHTEENTH 1937.

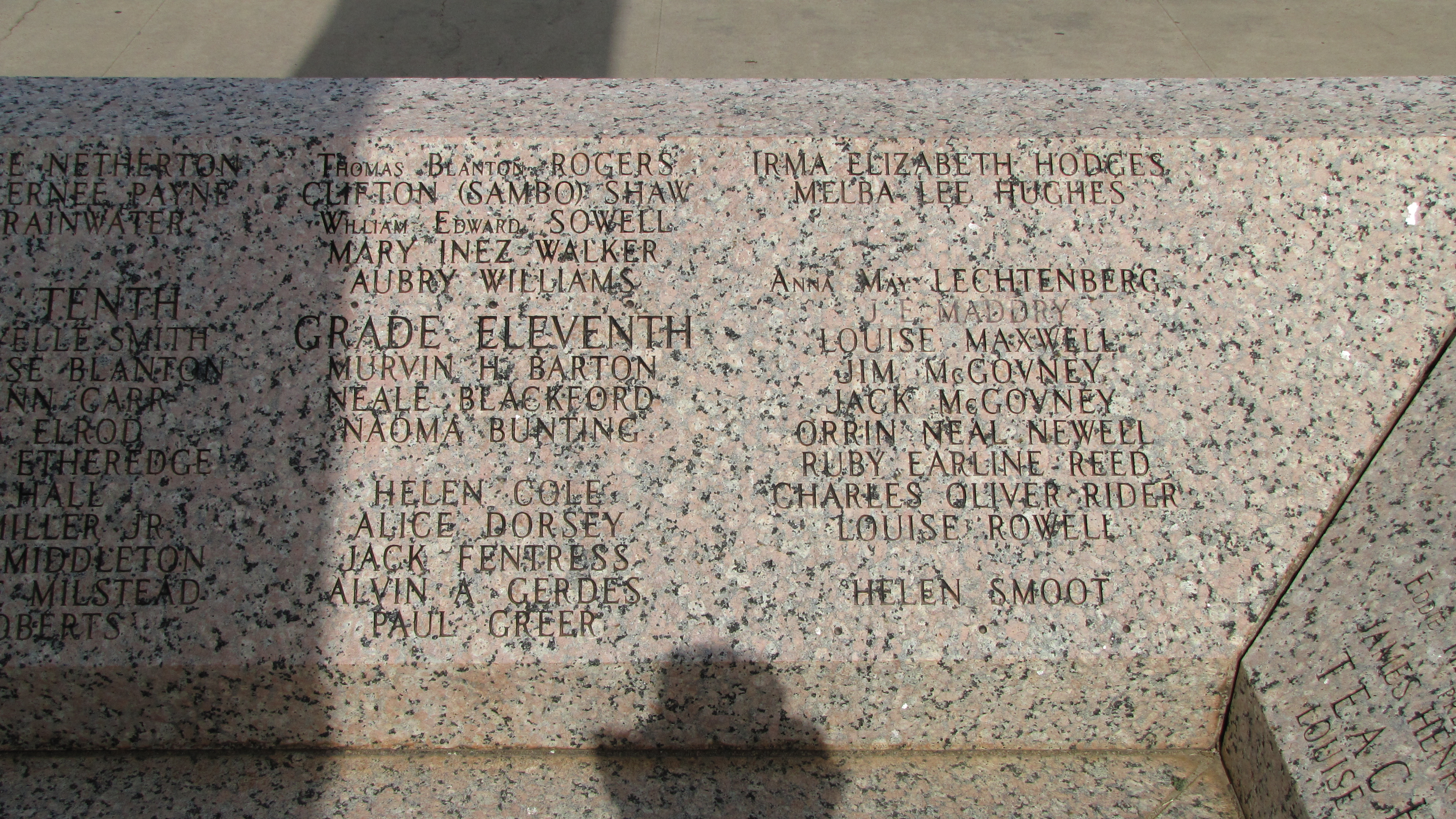
Gaps between names inscribed on the surrounding wall represent children whose parents opted against their inclusion in the memorial.

The short wall surrounding the base is beveled and bears the names of many of the individuals who died in the disaster. (Note: Sources vary on the exact number of names inscribed on the memorial. On the low end, historian Kenneth E. Foote stated in a 1997 history book that there are 270 names, while other sources give numbers of 277, 294, and 296. In a 1984 book, author Kevin C. Evans gave a breakdown for the names, with 280 being for students and 14 for teachers.) The students' names are grouped by grade level. The memorial does not include all known fatalities of the disaster, as several families opted against including their children's names on the memorial. The designers of the monument opted to leave gaps for omitted names so that they could be added later if the parents changed their minds; several later did. In addition, the names of several individuals not initially counted among the deceased have been added to a pink granite slab located near the beveled wall.

The memorial is located in a median strip of New London's Main Street, which is also signed as Texas State Highway 42, with an address of 690 Main Street. It is in front of West Rusk High School, which was built on the site of the destroyed school.

== Later history ==
Despite the creation of the monument, the local community did little to publicly commemorate the event over the next several decades, which several commentators have attributed to an uneasiness with local residents. In 1977, Wayne Shaffer, who was in elementary school in New London during the explosion, organized a memorial ceremony, which was attended by several of the survivors. Initially held every two years, these memorial services at the cenotaph have been an annual occurrence since at least the 2020s and continue to the current day.

In 1979, the monument was repaired by the Gould Monument Company of Jacksonville, Tennessee. This followed a vehicle collision that had damaged the structure. In 1987, a smaller memorial was erected near the base of the cenotaph in commemoration of the fiftieth anniversary of the disaster. The marker bears an image of hands in prayer and the following inscription:

IN LOVING MEMORY / 1937 1987 / LONDON EX-STUDENTS REUNION / AND MEMORIAL ASSOCIATION INC

Several years later, in 1989, the Texas Historical Commission erected an Official Texas Historical Marker near the memorial, due south.

In 1993, the memorial was surveyed as part of the Save Outdoor Sculpture! project, and in 1998, a local history museum that focuses on the disaster was opened near the memorial, on the other side of the road from the new high school building.

== Sources ==
- Anderson, Ashlyn (March 22, 2025) [March 18, 2025]. "New London School explosion survivor relives tragic day on 88th anniversary". KETK-TV. Archived from the original on April 10, 2025.
- Awbrey, Betty Dooley; Dooley, Claude (2005). Why Stop?: A Guide to Texas Historical Roadside Markers. Texas Historical Commission (Fifth ed.). Lanham, Maryland: Taylor Trade Publishing. ISBN 978-1-58979-482-5. OCLC 1480332774.
- Brown, David M.; Wereschagin, Michael (2012). Gone at 3:17: The Untold Story of the Worst School Disaster in American History. Washington, D.C.: Potomac Books. ISBN 978-1-61234-153-8. OCLC 773897792.
- Conte, JD (March 17, 2024). "Community gathers ahead of 87th anniversary of New London School explosion". KLTV. Archived from the original on March 17, 2024.
- Cox, Mike (2015). "The Day a Generation Died: New London School Explosion (1937)". Texas Disasters: True Stories of Tragedy and Survival (Second ed.). Guilford, Connecticut: Globe Pequot Press. pp. 109–120. ISBN 978-1-4930-1317-3. OCLC 913743132.
- Evans, Kevin C. (1984). "The New London Cenotaph". In Ruff, Ann (ed.). Amazing Texas Monuments & Museums: From the Enchanting to the Bizarre. Foreword by Lynn Ashby. Houston: Lone Star Books. pp. 28–30. ISBN 978-0-88415-564-5. OCLC 9894395.
- Foote, Kenneth E. (1997). Shadowed Ground: America's Landscapes of Violence and Tragedy. Austin, Texas: University of Texas Press. ISBN 978-0-292-72499-0. OCLC 35364707.
- Gaddis, Aislyn (August 13, 2024). "A tiny East Texas museum makes sure the history of the London School explosion is not forgotten". Texas Standard. Archived from the original on September 25, 2025.
- Holland, Blake (March 17, 2023). "Saturday marks 86 years since New London school explosion in Rusk County". KLTV. Archived from the original on October 3, 2023.
- Kasper, Alan (March 19, 2021). "84 Years Later: New London School explosion". KYTX. Archived from the original on March 21, 2021.
- Little, Carol Morris (1996). "New London". A Comprehensive Guide to Outdoor Sculpture in Texas. Austin, Texas: University of Texas Press. pp. 343–344. ISBN 978-0-292-76036-3. OCLC 33667525.
- McDonnold, Paul (August 2019). "The New London Museum Recalls the Most Deadly School Tragedy in U.S. History". Texas Highways. Texas Department of Transportation. ISSN 0040-4349. OCLC 999544444. Archived from the original on May 19, 2025.
- Raissi, Sharon (March 19, 2024) [March 17, 2023]. "From the Archives: Remembering the New London school explosion, 87 years later". KETK-TV. Archived from the original on July 20, 2025.
- Rozelle, Ron (2012). My Boys and Girls Are in There: The 1937 New London School Explosion. College Station, Texas: Texas A&M University Press. ISBN 978-1-60344-761-4. OCLC 794239536.
- Sizer, Mona (2005). Texas Disasters: Wind, Flood, and Fire. Lanham, Maryland: Republic of Texas Press. ISBN 978-1-58979-171-8. OCLC 55600937.
- "New London Cenotaph, (sculpture)". Smithsonian Institution Research Information System. Archived from the original on September 30, 2025.
- Wall, Barbra Mann (2011). "The New London, Texas, School Explosion, 1937: "Unparalleled Disaster"". In Wall, Barbara Mann; Keeling, Arlene W. (eds.). Nurses on the Front Line: When Disaster Strikes, 1878–2010. New York City: Springer Publishing. pp. 151–166. ISBN 978-0-8261-0519-6. OCLC 676698373.
