= Tyree Wilson =

American football player (born 2000)

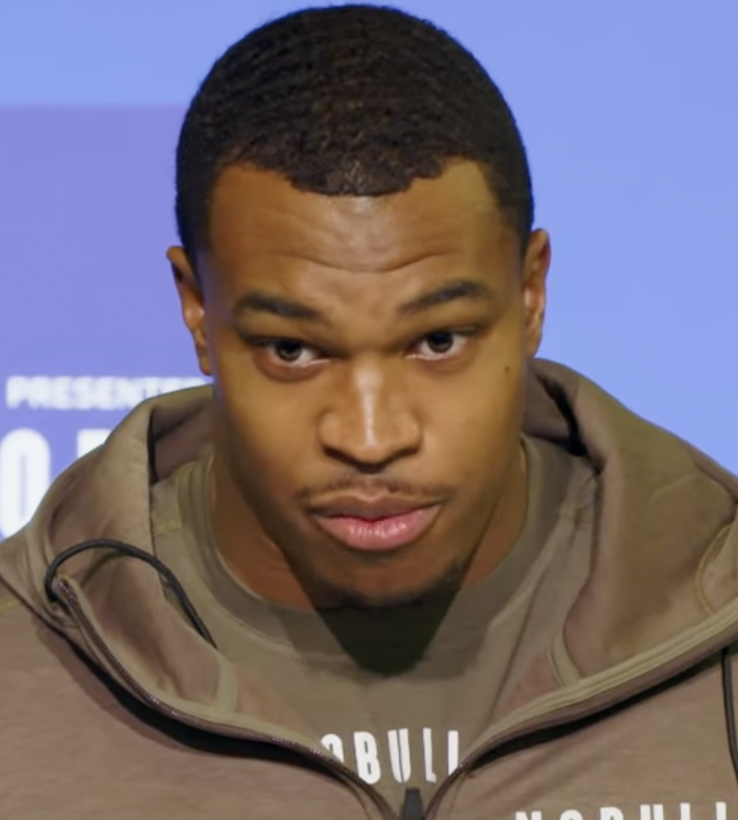
- Wilson at the 2023 NFL Combine

No. 98 – New Orleans Saints
- Position: Defensive end
- Roster status: Active

Personal information
- Born: May 20, 2000 (age 26); Anchorage, Alaska, U.S.
- Listed height: 6 ft 6 in (1.98 m)
- Listed weight: 263 lb (119 kg)

Career information
- High school: West Rusk (New London, Texas)
- College: Texas A&M (2018–2019); Texas Tech (2020–2022)
- NFL draft: 2023: 1st round, 7th overall pick

Career history
- Las Vegas Raiders (2023–2025); New Orleans Saints (2026–present)

Awards and highlights
- First-team All-American (2022); First-team All-Big 12 (2022)

Career NFL statistics as of Week 9, 2026
- Total tackles: 109
- Sacks: 13
- Forced fumbles: 4
- Fumble recoveries: 2
- Pass deflections: 1
- Stats at Pro Football Reference

Tyree Jae Wilson (born May 20, 2000) is an American professional football defensive end for the New Orleans Saints of the National Football League (NFL). He played college football for the Texas A&M Aggies and Texas Tech Red Raiders before being selected seventh overall in the 2023 NFL draft by the Las Vegas Raiders.

== Early life ==
Wilson was born on May 20, 2000, in Anchorage, Alaska, moving with his family to Henderson, Texas, in 2002. He attended West Rusk High School in New London, Texas, where he made 126 tackles with 38 tackles for loss, five forced fumbles, and five fumbles recovered as a senior on their football team. Wilson was rated a three-star recruit and initially committed to play college football at Washington State before decommitting before the start of his senior year. He ultimately committed to play at Texas A&M.

== College career ==
Wilson began his college career at Texas A&M and redshirted his true freshman season. As a redshirt freshman he played in 12 games and made 12 tackles with three tackles for loss and one sack. Wilson entered the NCAA transfer portal after the end of the season.

Wilson ultimately transferred to Texas Tech. He was granted a waiver by the NCAA to play immediately instead of having to sit out one season per transfer rules. Wilson became a starter on the Red Raiders' defense towards the end of his first season with the team. As a redshirt junior, he had 38 tackles and led the team with 13.5 tackles for loss and seven sacks. Wilson was named the Defensive MVP of the 2021 Liberty Bowl after making two sacks in the game. In 2022 against Kansas, Wilson suffered a season-ending foot injury. Wilson later announced that he would forgo his senior year and declare for the NFL draft. Following the conclusion of the regular season, Wilson was selected to the All-Big 12 First Team.

== Professional career ==
Pre-draft measurables
Height	Weight	Arm length	Hand span	Wingspan	Bench press
6 ft 5 5/8 in (1.97 m)	271 lb (123 kg)	35 5/8 in (0.90 m)	9 5/8 in (0.24 m)	7 ft 0 1/2 in (2.15 m)	23 reps
All values from the NFL Combine

=== Las Vegas Raiders ===
In the 2023 NFL draft, Wilson was selected seventh overall by the Las Vegas Raiders. He was placed on the non-football injury list on July 21, 2023 but was nonetheless healthy for the season opener, where he recorded a tackle assist in a 17–16 win against the Denver Broncos. He recorded his first career sack in a Week 7, 12–30 loss to the Chicago Bears and would record a further half sack two weeks later in a 30–6 win over the New York Giants. His second full sack came in a Week 14, 0–3 loss to the Minnesota Vikings. He finished his rookie season with 3.5 sacks, 29 total tackles (16 solo), one forced fumble, and one fumble recovery in 17 games.

In 2024, Wilson appeared in 16 games with four starts and recorded 27 tackles, a career-high 4.5 sacks, six tackles for loss and one forced fumble. In 2025, he recorded 4.0 sacks with eight tackles for loss and six quarterback hits. Wilson also had a pair of forced fumbles, one pass defended, and one fumble recovery.

=== New Orleans Saints ===
On April 25, 2026, the New Orleans Saints traded for Wilson during the fifth round of the 2026 NFL draft, sending the 150th pick to the Raiders (used to pick safety Dalton Johnson). The Saints also received the 219th pick from the Raiders (used to select cornerback TJ Hall). Two days later, the Saints declined the fifth-year option of Wilson's contract, making him a free agent following the 2026 season.

== NFL career statistics ==
Legend
**Bold**	Career high

=== Regular season ===
Year	Team	Games		Tackles					Fumbles					Interceptions			
Year	Team	GP	GS	Cmb	Solo	Ast	Sck	TFL	FF	FR	Yds	SFTY	TD	Int	Yds	TD	PD
2023	LV	17	0	29	16	**13**	3.5	2	1	**1**	0	0	0	0	0	0	0
2024	LV	16	4	27	16	11	**4.5**	6	1	0	0	0	0	0	0	0	0
2025	LV	17	3	**35**	**25**	10	4.0	**8**	**2**	**1**	0	**1**	0	0	0	0	**1**
2026	NOR	4	0	11	6	6	1.0	1	0	0	0	0	0	0	0	0	0
Career		54	7	102	63	39	13.0	17	4	2	0	1	0	0	0	0	1
