= Matchett Herring Coe =

American sculptor (1907–1999)

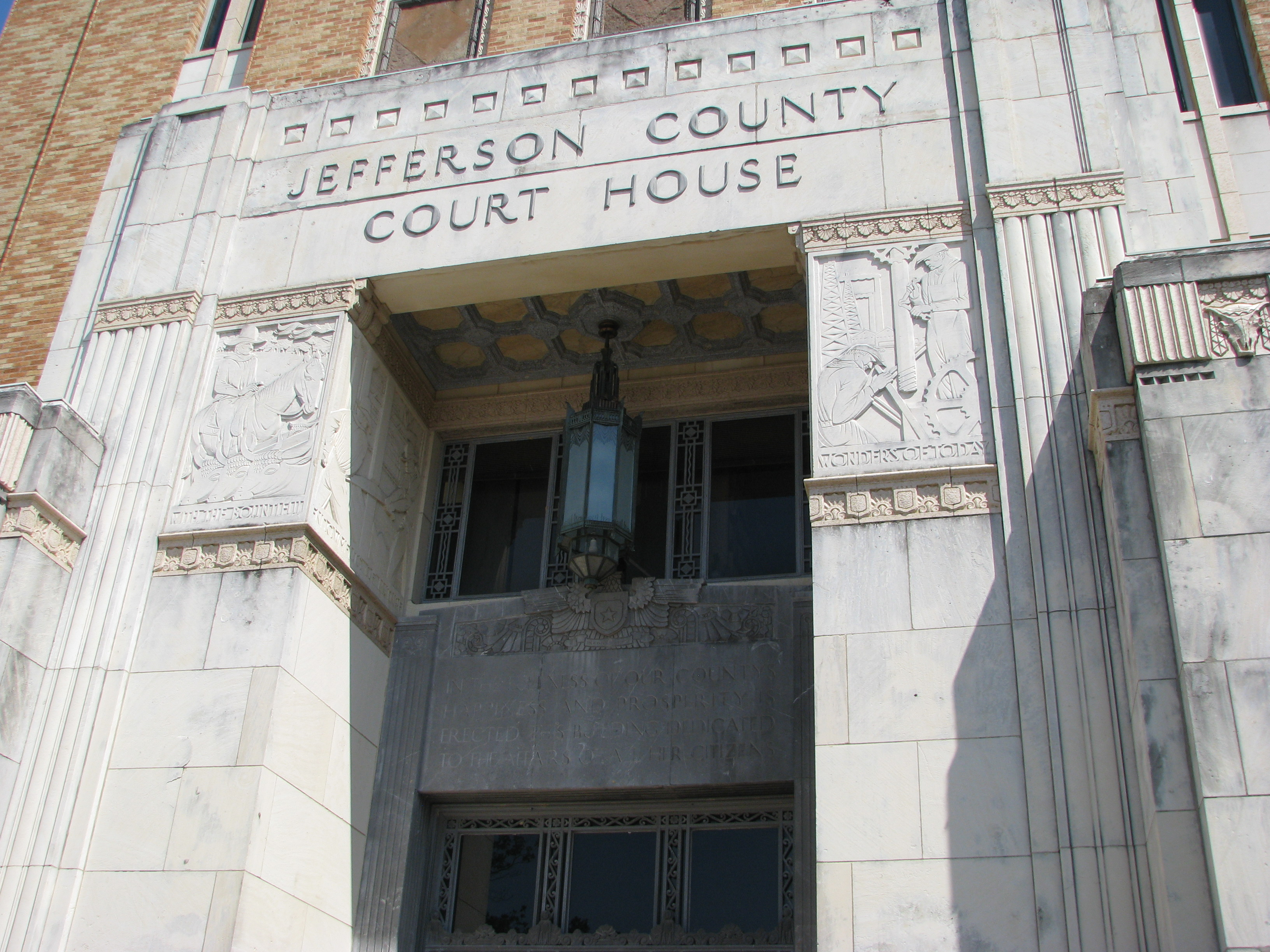
Coe's reliefs at the Jefferson County Court House, Beaumont, Texas, 1931 (note cowskulls at right)

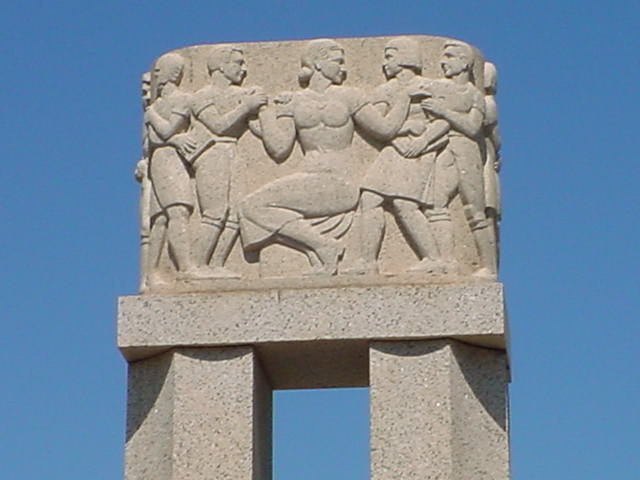
New London Cenotaph, 1939

Matchett Herring Coe (1907–1999) was an American sculptor active in Texas.

Coe was born in Loeb (now Lumberton), Texas and lived in the Beaumont area most of his life. He graduated from Lamar College, attended Cranbrook Educational Community and served with the Seabees on Guadalcanal during World War II, but was active as a sculptor before the war. His works have been featured at the Metropolitan Museum in New York, the Carnegie Museum in Pittsburgh, and the Corcoran Gallery of Art in Washington, D. C.

Several of his best known works include his 1936 commissioned sculpture of Confederate hero Richard W. Dowling at Sabine Pass, Texas for the Texas Centennial. Coe also created the 1961 statue of the Texas Confederate Veteran featured at the Vicksburg National Military Park in Mississippi.

== Work ==
- friezes and other work at Jefferson County Court House, Beaumont, Texas, 1931
- reliefs of workers and business people, First National Bank Building (Beaumont, Texas), 1937
- architectural sculpture for the Houston City Hall (with Raoul Josset), 1939-1939
- his cenotaph commemorating school children killed in an explosion at New London, Texas, 1939
- reliefs on the Fondren Library at Rice University
- work at Lamar University
- Entrance pylons, work on the Reptile House, and other work at the Houston Zoo, including a Cobra sculpture outside the entrance of the Reptile house.
- Unknown work [reference needed] at Guadalcanal Veteran's Memorial in Solomon Islands

== Sources ==
- Coe biography
- on the Dowling statue
