= Ron Rozelle =

American author, newspaper columnist, and educator

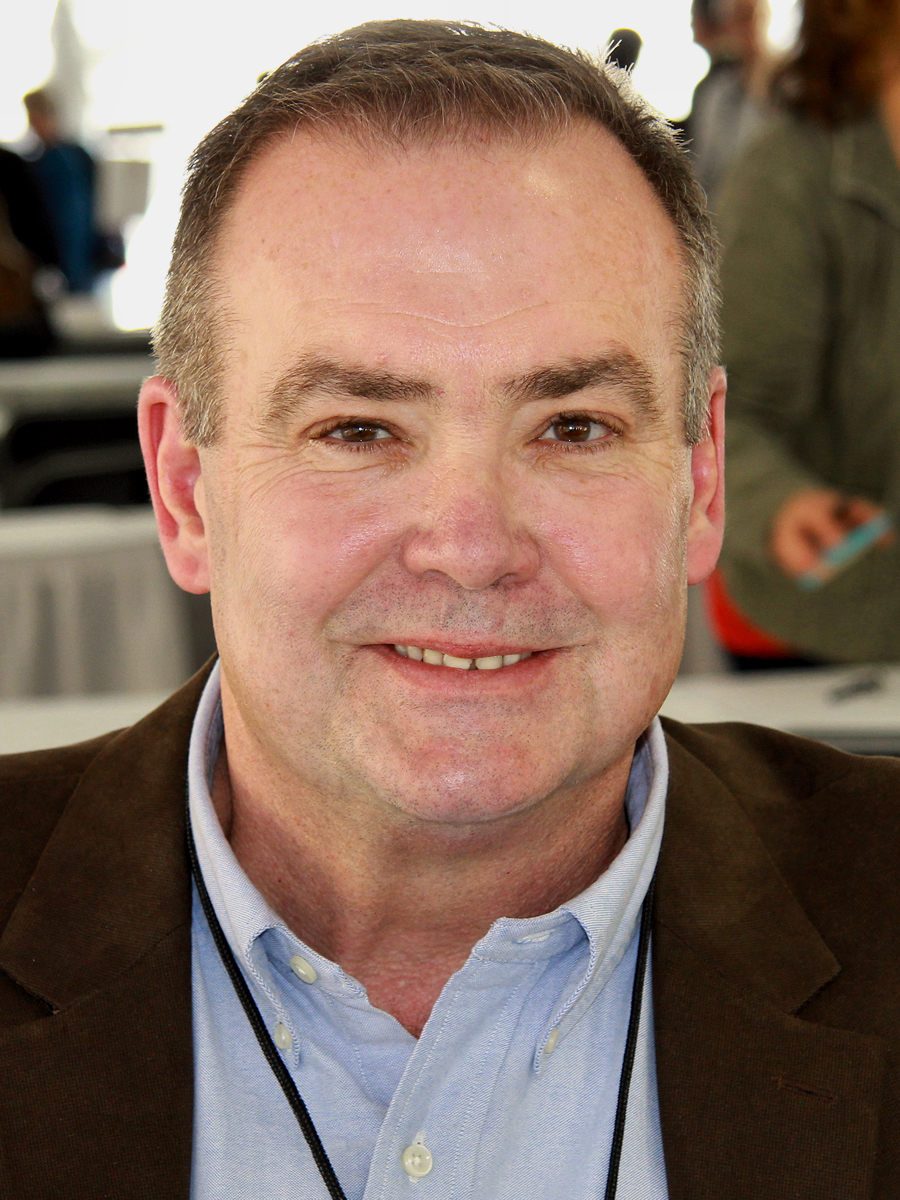
Rozelle at the 2012 Texas Book Festival.

Ronald Rozelle is an American author, newspaper columnist, and educator who won the 2022 Summerlee Book Prize for Creative writing.

Ronald Rozelle was raised in Oakwood, Texas, where his father Lester was an educator and school superintendent. He graduated from Oakwood High School in 1970 and earned a Bachelor's of Arts from Sam Houston State University. After teaching English for several years at Palestine High School in Palestine, Texas, Rozelle moved to Lake Jackson, Texas to teach at Brazoswood High School.

In 2017, Rozelle was named a Distinguished Educator of the Year by Sam Houston State University's College of Education.

Rozelle's first book, a memoir called Into That Good Night, contrasted his experience as a father with his experiences as a son. Publishers Weekly noted the book's "potentially tricky structure that ultimately yields a spare, beautifully written" tribute to his father. The Southwestern Historical Quarterly described his account of the 1937 New London School Explosion, My Boys and Girls are in There, as "a well-researched yet eminently readable narrative" that "portrays a very human story in a very human way".

His weekly column for The Brazosport Facts has been compiled into a book, Sundays with Ron Rozelle. His novel, Leaving the Country of Sin: A Novel, was awarded the 2022 Sumerlee Book Prize for Creative writing from the Lamar University Center for History and Culture.

== Bibliography ==
=== Fiction ===
- A Place Apart: A Novel (2001), published by Texas Review Press
- Touching Winter: A Novel in Four Parts (2005), published by Texas Review Press
- Leaving the Country of Sin: A Novel (2021), published by Texas Review Press
- The Windows of Heaven: A Novel of Galveston’s Great Storm of 1900 (2022), published by Texas Review Press

=== Non-Fiction ===
- Into That Good Night (1998), memoir, published by Farrar, Straus and Giroux
- Write Great Fiction: Description & Setting(2005), published by Writer's Digest
- Warden: Texas Prison Life and Death from the Inside Out (2005), written with Jim Willett, published by Blue Sky Press
- Sundays with Ron Rozelle (2009), published by TCU Press
- The Road to Enterprise: One Man’s Journey in the Land of Opportunity (2011), written with Arch Aplin Jr., published by AuthorHouse
- My Boys and Girls Are In There (2012), New London School explosion, published by Texas A&M University Press
- Exiled: The Last Days of Sam Houston (2017), published by Texas A&M University Press
