= Jefferson County Courthouse (Texas) =

- U.S. National Register of Historic Places
- Texas State Antiquities Landmark
- Jefferson County Courthouse

- Location within Texas Location within the United States
- Location: 1149 Pearl St., Beaumont, Texas
- Coordinates: 30°4′44″N 94°5′36″W
- Area: 2 acres (0.81 ha)
- Built: 1931
- Architect: Fred C. Stone, Augustin Babin
- Architectural style: Art Deco
- NRHP reference No.: 82004509
- TSAL No.: 8200000394

Significant dates
- Added to NRHP: June 17, 1982
- Designated TSAL: January 1, 1992

The Jefferson County Courthouse in Beaumont, Texas is one of the tallest courthouses in the state, and is an excellent example of Art Deco architecture. Built in 1931, it is the fourth courthouse built in Jefferson County. It was designed by Fred Stone and Augustin Babin, and is thirteen stories high. In 1981, an annex was added to the west side of the courthouse.

== History ==
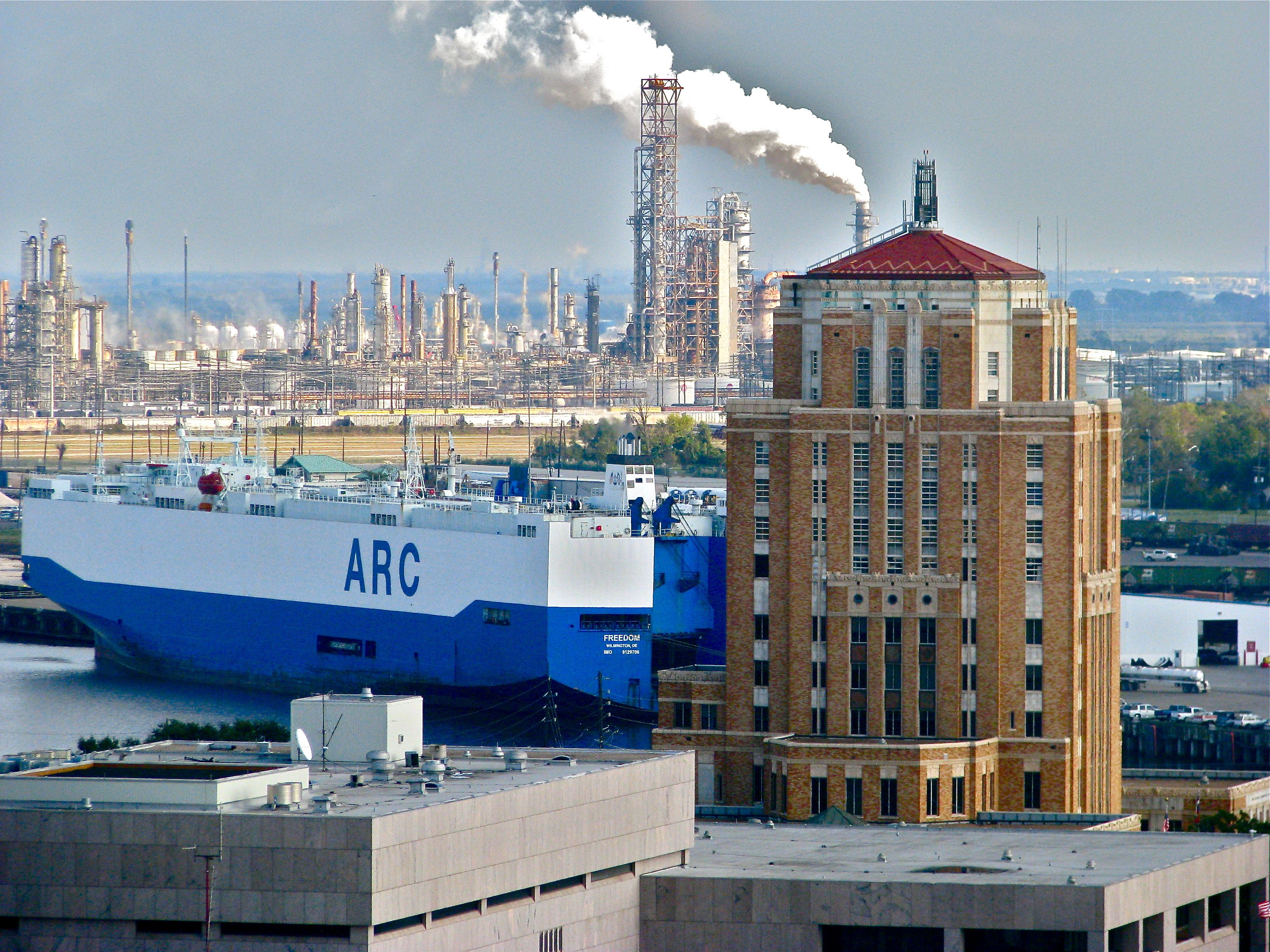
The Jefferson County Courthouse and Annex. The Port of Beaumont in the background.

The county has had four courthouses. The first building built by the county was a simple wood structure built to serve as the county jail. The second courthouse was built in 1854 and was a simple two story square structure. A third courthouse, a three-story red brick building designed by E.T. Heiner, was built in 1893. By the late 1920s Beaumont had grown so much that the courthouse was inadequate to meet the needs of the people, and by early 1931 the present brick structure was completed. The architects were Fred C. Stone & A. Babin; the sculptor of the frieze panels and other architectural sculpture was Beaumont sculptor Matchett Herring Coe.

The building has retained nearly all of its originality over the years, including its marble interior, but in 1981 an annex was added to the west side to increase space. The annex connects to the original courthouse through the basement, first, and second floors. The only public entrance is through the annex due to recent security upgrades.

Floors eight through thirteen of the courthouse once served as the county jail, one can tell by the barred windows. Today the space is used for storage.

== Restoration ==
A $22 million restoration project was completed in 2011. Phase one was completed in May 2009 when the copper roof from the 1940s was replaced with a multicolored tile roof, similar to the original. Phase two began August 2010, and cleaned and restored granite and windows from the fifth to 13th floor.

== Images ==
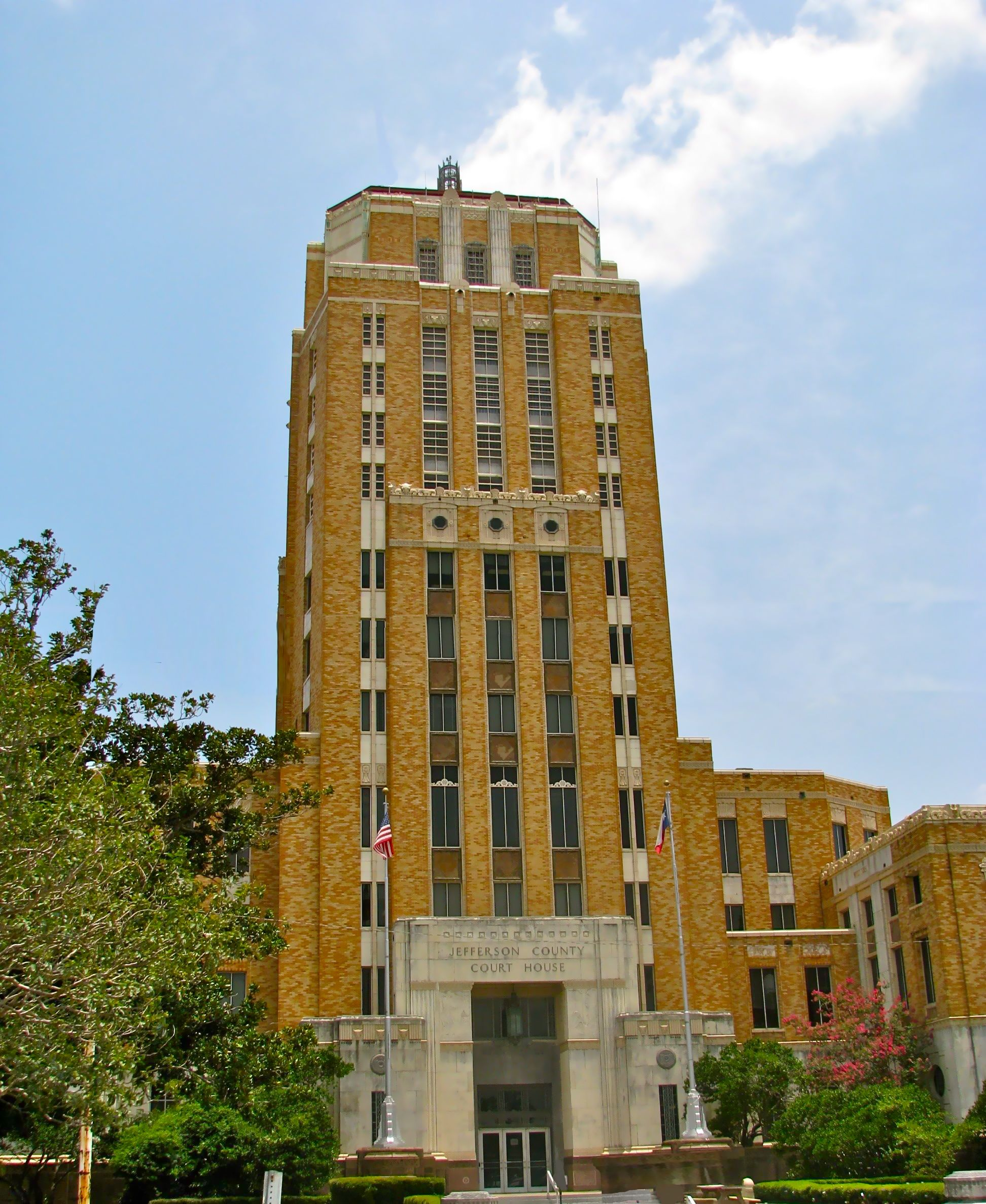

The main entrance.

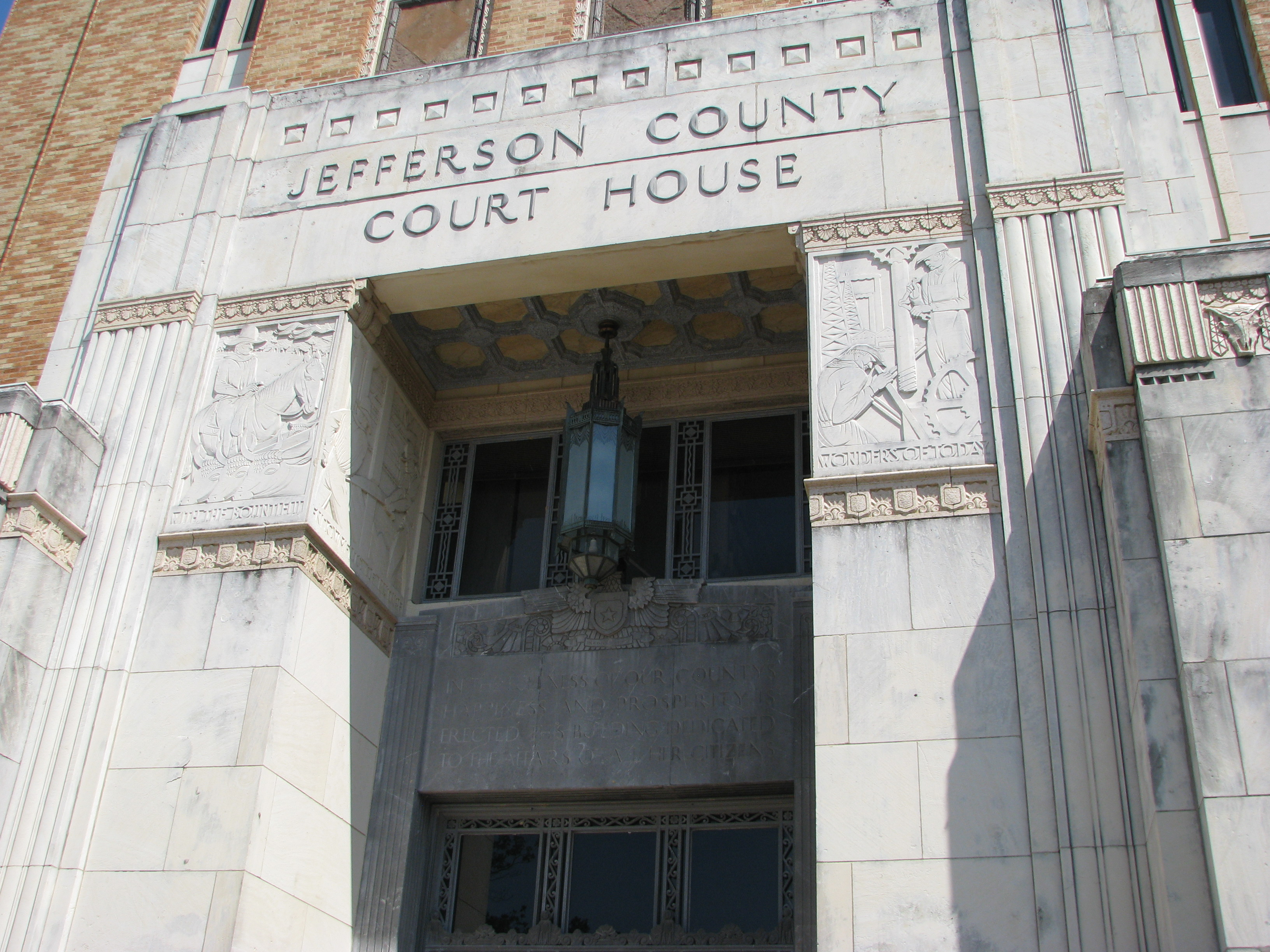
The front entryway.

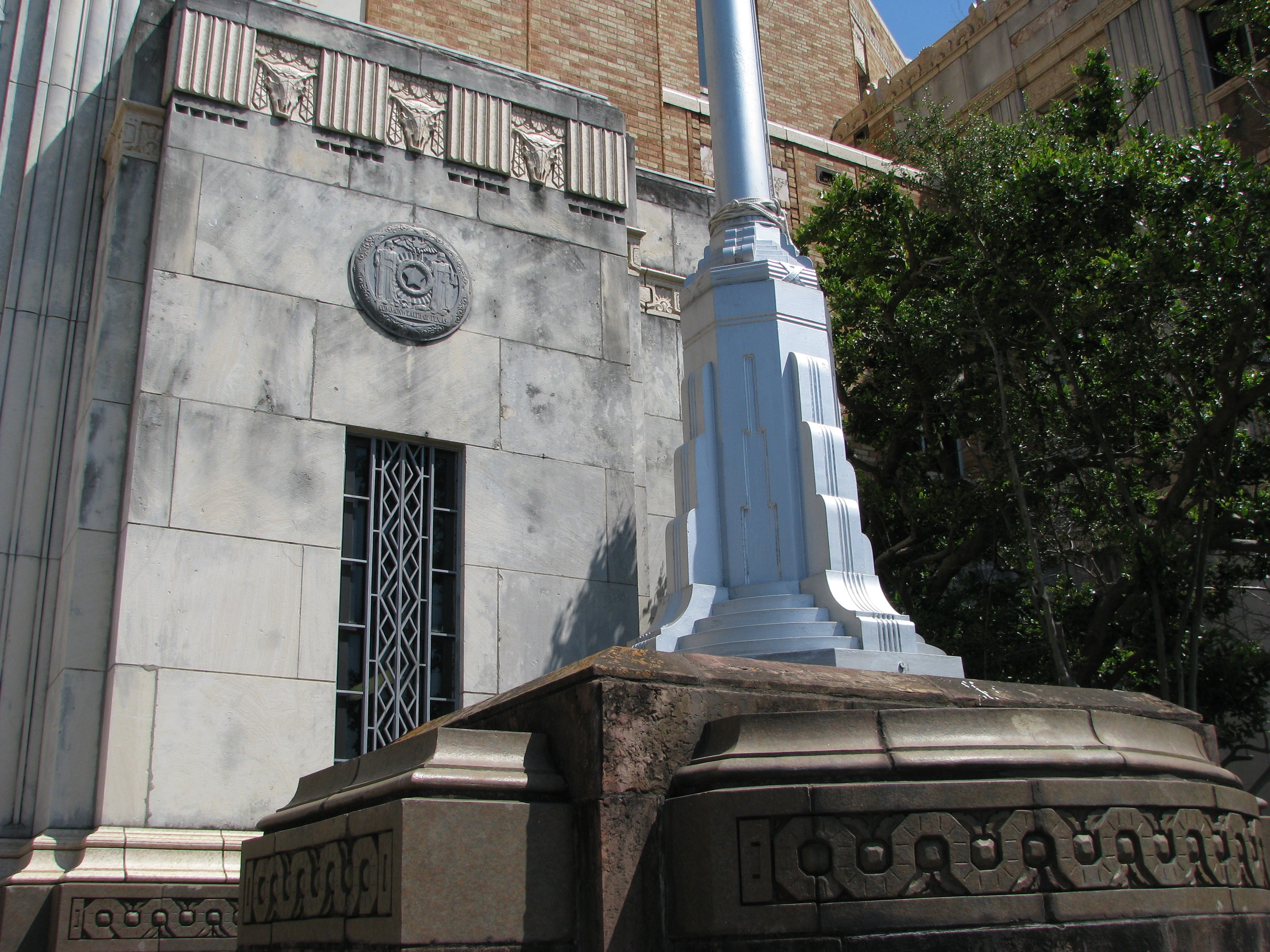
Art Deco detail near the entryway.

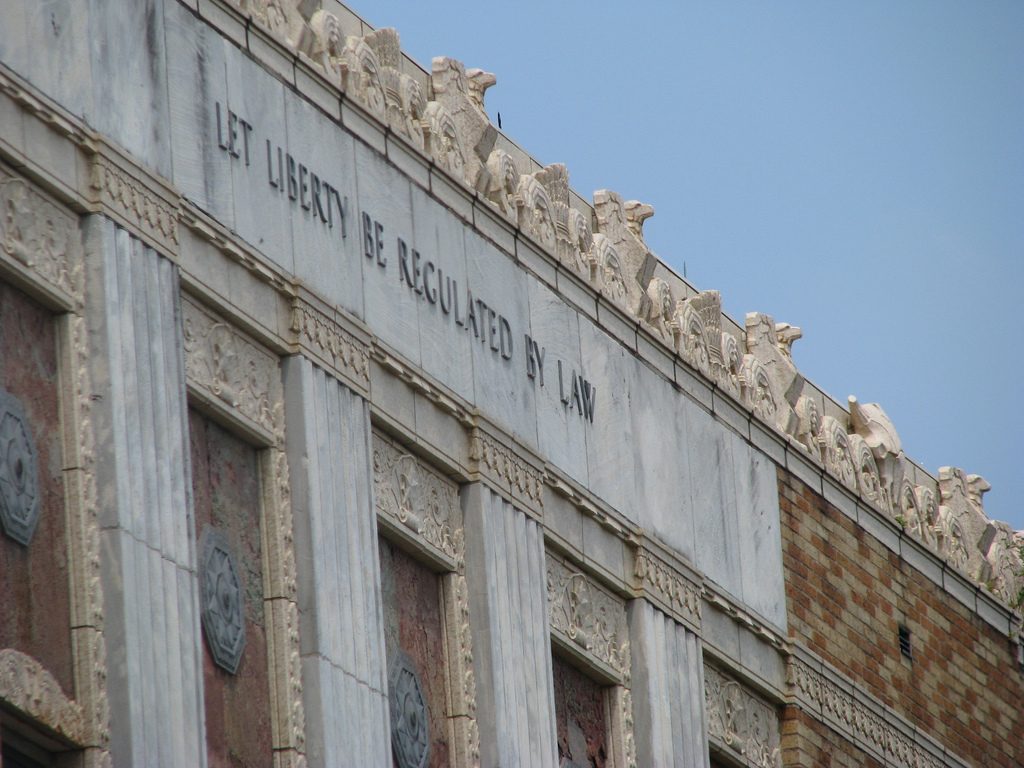
Detail on the rear of the courthouse.

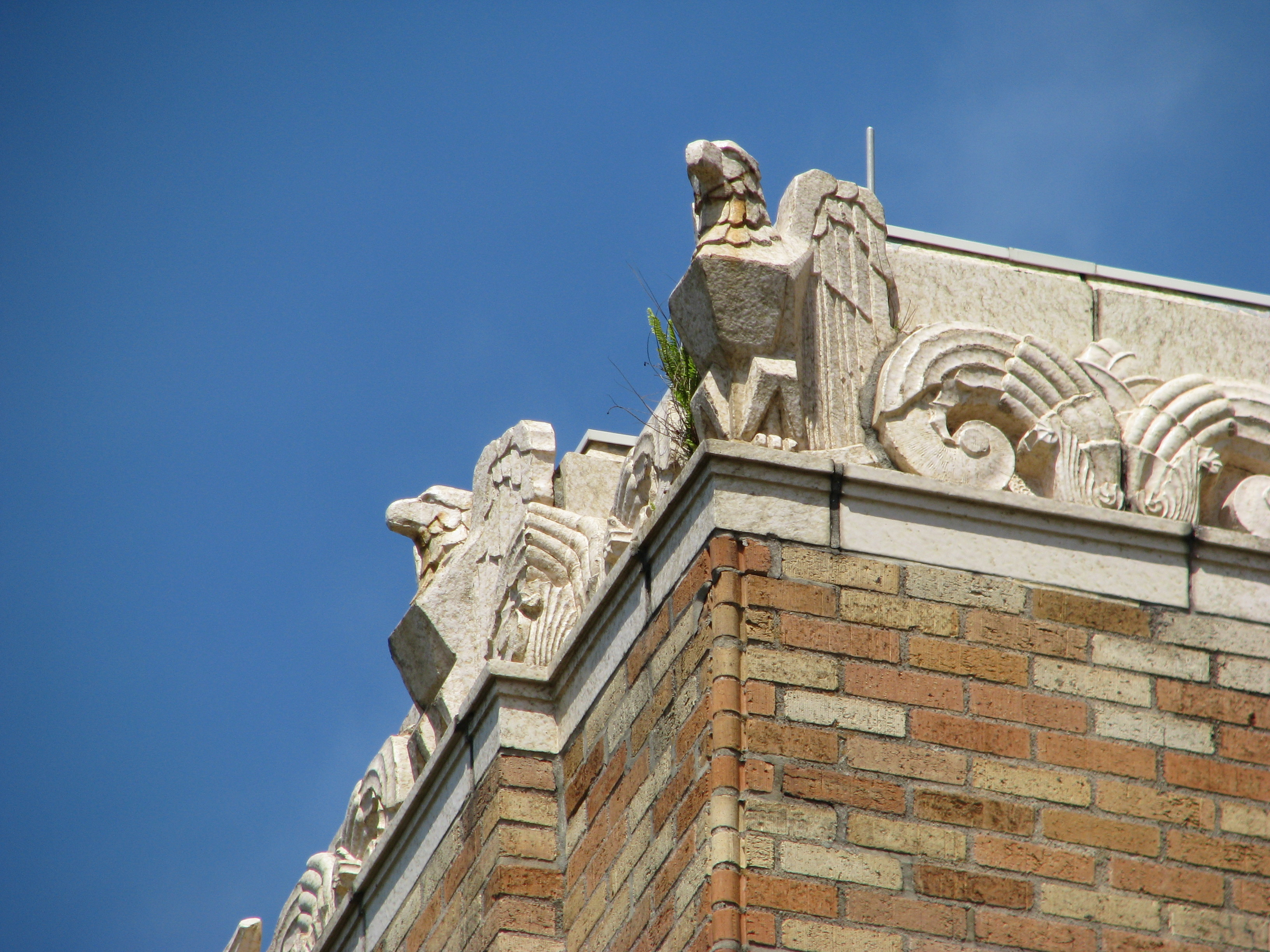
Carving detail.

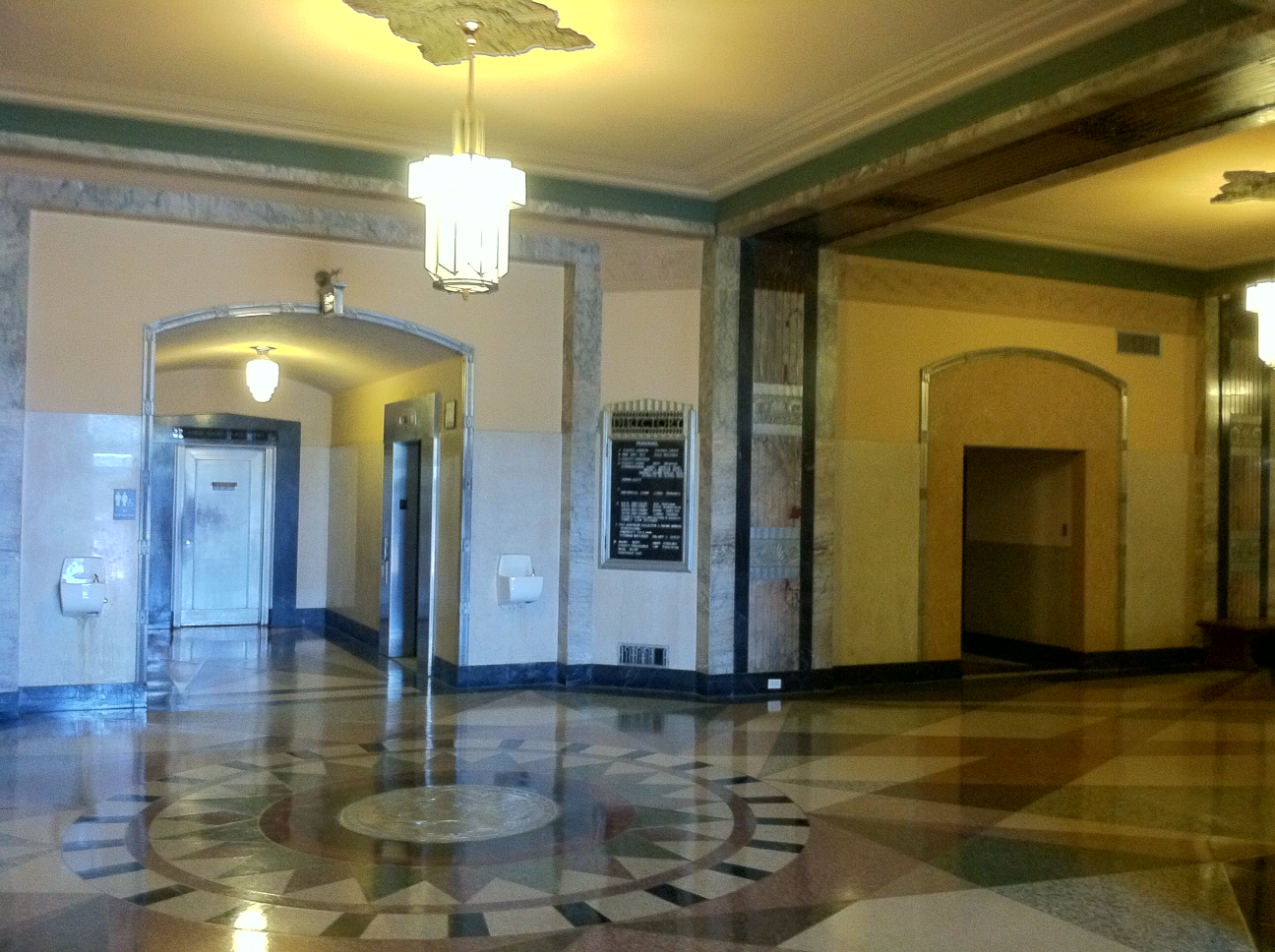
Main Lobby of Courthouse

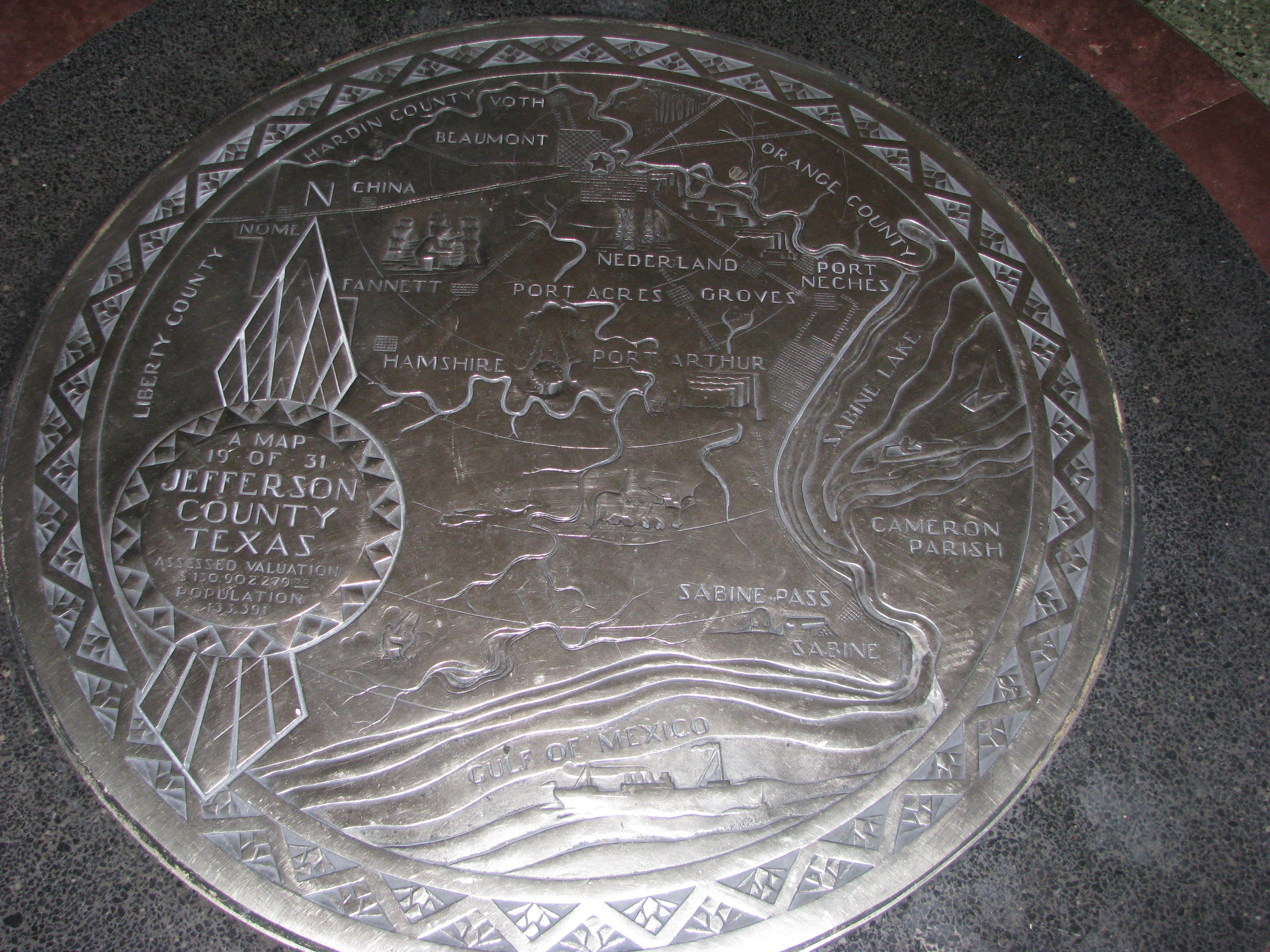
Map of Jefferson County.

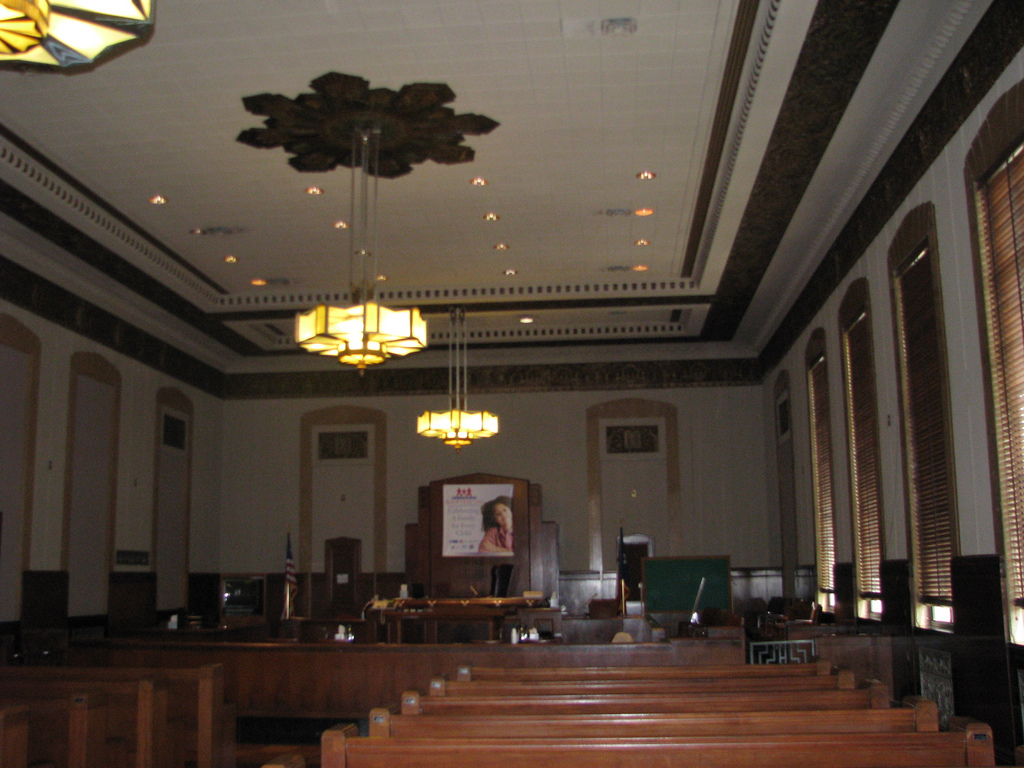
317th District Courtroom.

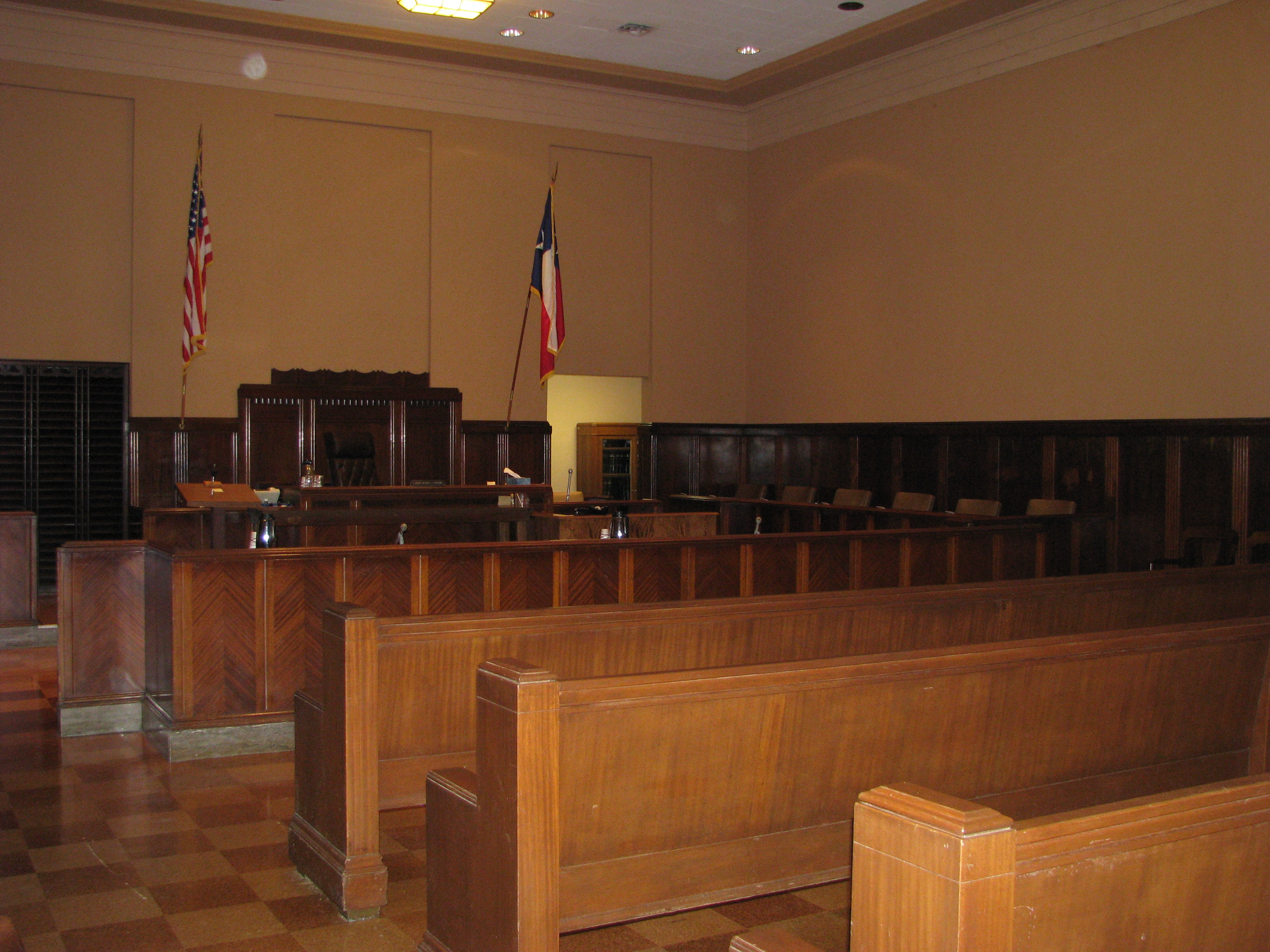
County Court at Law No. 1

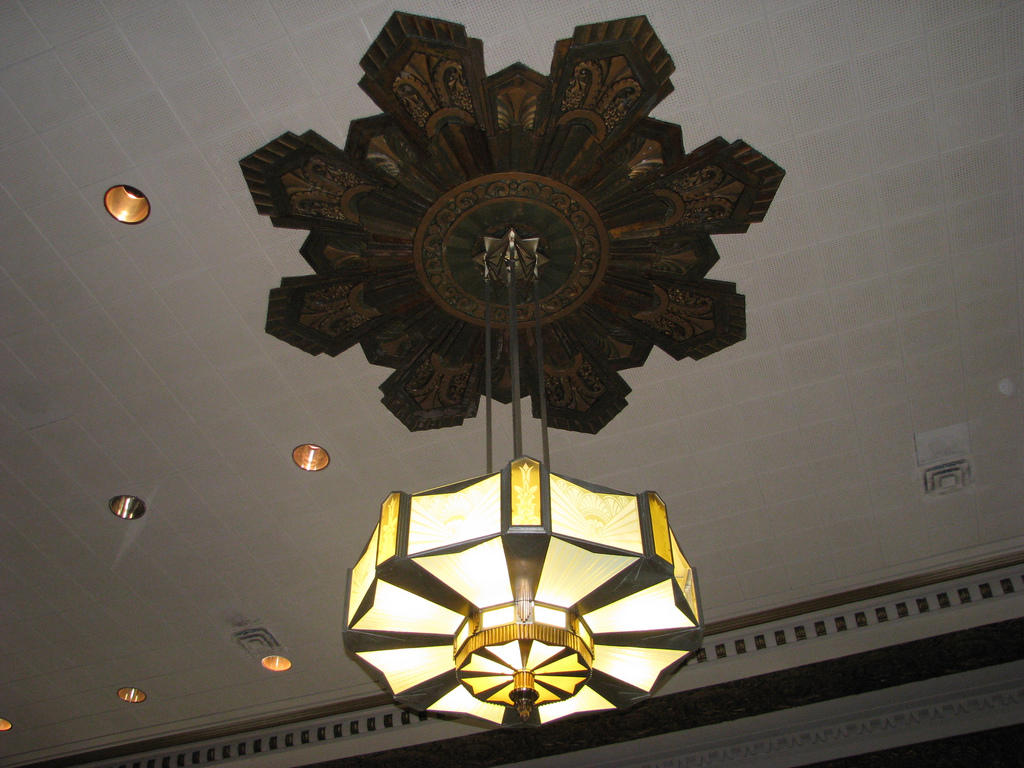
Light fixture.

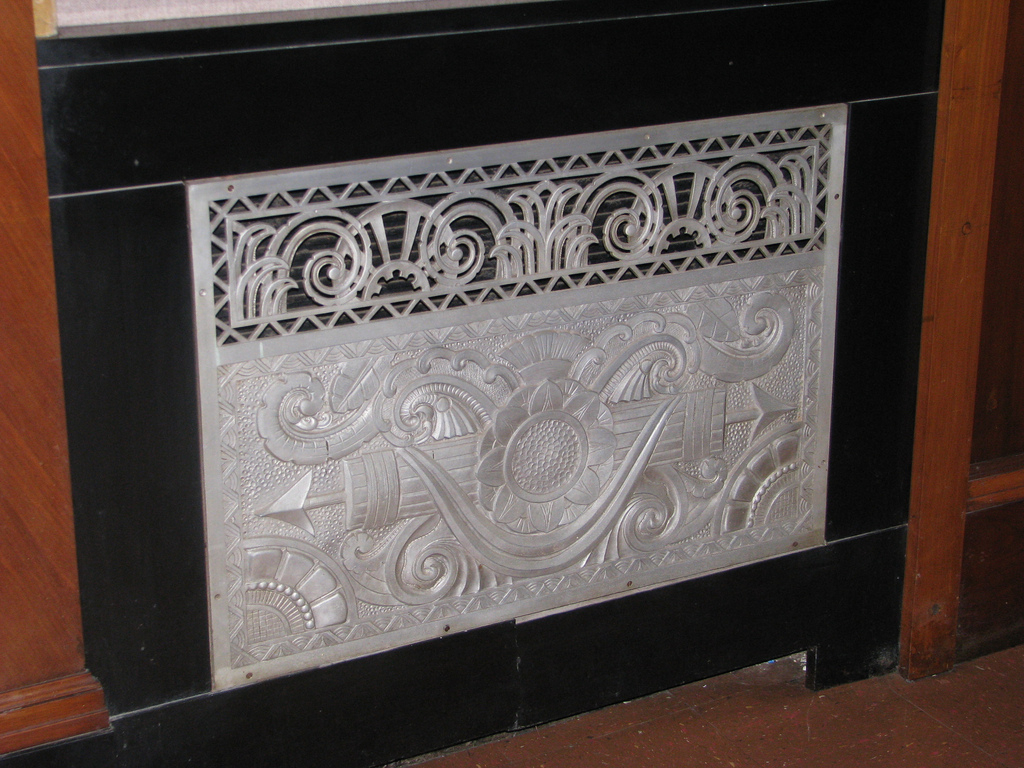
Courtroom heater grill.

== See also ==
- National Register of Historic Places listings in Jefferson County, Texas

== Bibliography ==
- Bradley, Barrie Scardino (2020). Improbable Metropolis: Houston's Architectural and Urban History. Austin: University of Texas Press. ISBN 978-1-4773-2019-8.
- Kelsey, Mavis P, Sr.; Dyal, Donald H. (1993). The Courthouses of Texas. College Station, TX: Texas A&M University Press. ISBN 0-89096-546-3.
