= New London School explosion =

Gas leak explosion in New London, Texas in 1937

Coordinates: 32°14′21″N 94°56′29″W

- 1937 newsreel
- Date: March 18, 1937
- Time: 3:05 – 3:20 p.m. CST
- Location: New London, Texas, U.S.
- Cause: Gas explosion
- Deaths: 425+
- Injuries: 300+

The New London School explosion occurred on March 18, 1937, when a natural gas leak caused an explosion that destroyed the London School in New London, Texas, United States. The disaster killed 425 students and teachers. As of 2026, the event is the third-deadliest disaster in the history of Texas, after the 1900 Galveston hurricane and the 1947 Texas City disaster.

== Background ==
In the mid-1930s, despite the ongoing economic turmoil of the Great Depression, the school district in New London, Texas (formerly known as London) was one of the richest in the United States. The 1930 discovery of oil in Rusk County had boosted the local economy, and education spending grew with it. The city's taxable value in 1937 had grown to $20 million, with additional revenue seen from 15 oil wells on district property. The London School, a large structure of steel and concrete, was constructed in 1932 at a cost of $1 million (roughly $23.6 million today). Its football team, the London Wildcats (a play on the term "wildcatter," for an oil prospector), played in one of the first stadiums in the state to have electric lights.

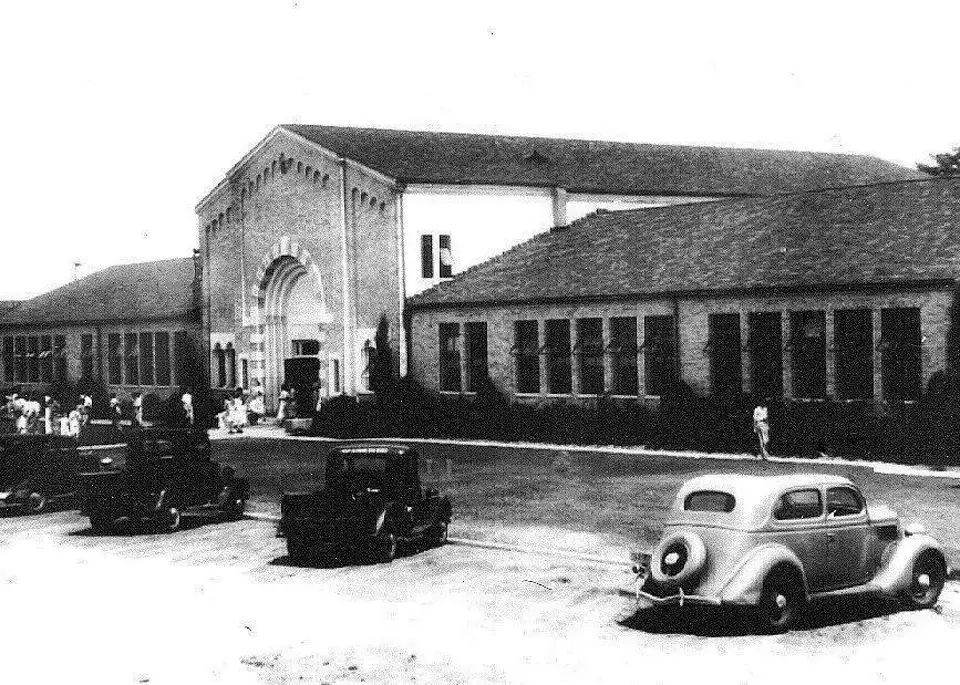
London School before the explosion

The London School was built on sloping ground, and a large air space was enclosed beneath the structure. The school board had overridden the original architect's plans for a boiler and steam distribution system, instead opting to install 72 gas heaters throughout the building.

Early in 1937, the school board canceled their natural gas contract and had plumbers install a tap into Parade Gasoline Company's residue gas line to save money. This practice—while not explicitly authorized by local oil companies—was widespread in the area. The natural gas extracted with the oil was considered a waste product and was flared off. As there was no value to the natural gas, the oil companies turned a blind eye. This "raw" or "wet" gas varied in quality from day to day, even from hour to hour.

Untreated natural gas is both odorless and colorless, so leaks are difficult to detect and may go unnoticed. Gas had been leaking from the residue line tap and built up inside the enclosed crawlspace that ran the entire 253-foot (77 m) length of the main school building's facade. Students had been complaining of headaches for some time, but little attention had been paid to the issue.

== Explosion ==
On March 18, 1937, first through fourth grade students were let out early; the following day's classes had been canceled to allow students to participate in the Interscholastic Meet, a scholastic and athletic competition, in neighboring Henderson. A PTA meeting was being held in the gymnasium, a separate structure roughly 100 feet (30 m) from the main building. Approximately 500 students and 40 teachers were in the main building at the time, although some numbers claim there were roughly 694 students in the main building and at the campus. At 3:17 p.m., Lemmie R. Butler, an "instructor of manual training," turned on an electric sander. It is believed that the sander's switch caused a spark that ignited the gas-air mixture.

Reports from witnesses state that the walls of the school bulged, the roof lifted from the building and then crashed back down, and the main wing of the structure collapsed. Survivors in the building claimed that lockers embedded in the wall were thrown at them by the blast, others were picked up by the force of the explosion, and the plaster and mortar formed a white haze. The force of the explosion was so great that a two-ton concrete block was thrown clear of the building and crushed a 1936 Chevrolet parked 200 feet away. Those who evacuated the building after the explosion were in a state of shock, with some recounting that they did not know what to do next and that it seemed the world was dead silent until the sound came back all at once.

The explosion was its own alarm, reportedly heard up to four miles away from the school. The most immediate response was from parents at the PTA meeting. Within minutes, area residents started to arrive and began digging through the rubble, many with their bare hands. Many survivors also joined in the immediate aftermath in recovery of other survivors and victims. Roughnecks from the oil fields were released from their jobs and brought with them cutting torches and heavy equipment needed to clear the concrete and steel. Not all of the buildings on the 10-acre (4 ha) campus were destroyed.

School bus driver Lonnie Barber was transporting elementary students to their homes and was in sight of the school as it exploded. Barber continued his two-hour route, returning children to their parents before rushing back to the school to look for his own four children. His son Arden died, but the others were not seriously injured. Other school buses were employed to drive ambulatory survivors back to their homes, causing family members who were waiting at the bus stops to demand information from students disembarking.

== Rescue and recovery ==
Aid poured in from outside the area. Texas Governor James V. Allred dispatched Texas Rangers, the Texas Highway Patrol, and the Texas National Guard. Thirty doctors, 100 nurses, and 25 embalmers arrived from Dallas. Airmen from Barksdale Field, deputy sheriffs, and even Boy Scouts took part in the rescue and recovery. In their desperation to get victims and survivors out of the rubble, many rescuers did not immediately check if the bodies they came across were alive or dead.

Texas Rangers, including Bob Goss, assisted in the response in Kilgore.

Rescuers worked through night and rain, and seventeen hours later the entire site had been cleared. Many who worked in the rescue were overcome with shock as one survivor recounted; "Daddy worked so long he almost had a nervous breakdown. As long as he was working he was fine, but as soon as he came home and sat down he'd start shaking."

Buildings in the neighboring communities of Henderson, Overton, Kilgore and as far away as Tyler and Longview were converted into makeshift first aid tents and morgues to house the enormous number of bodies, and everything from family cars to delivery trucks served as hearses and ambulances. A new hospital, Mother Frances Hospital in Tyler, was scheduled to open the next day, but the dedication was canceled and the hospital opened immediately.

Reporters who arrived in New London found themselves swept up in the rescue effort. Former Dallas Times Herald executive editor Felix McKnight, then a young Associated Press reporter, recalled, "We identified ourselves and were immediately told that helpers were needed far more than reporters." Walter Cronkite also found himself in New London on one of his first assignments for United Press International. Although Cronkite went on to cover World War II and the Nuremberg trials, he was quoted as saying decades later, "I did nothing in my studies nor in my life to prepare me for a story of the magnitude of that New London tragedy, nor has any story since that awful day equaled it."

== Victims ==
The number of people estimated killed in the explosion is 294, but the actual number of victims remains unknown. Of the deceased, the majority were from grades five through eleven, as the younger students were educated in a separate building and most had already been dismissed from school. The majority of the fatalities are buried at Pleasant Hill Cemetery near New London, with an entire section being designated for the victims.

It was thought that one mother had a heart attack and died when she found out that her daughter had been killed, with only part of her face, her chin and a couple of bones recovered, but this story was found to be untrue when both mother and daughter were found alive.

=== Identification ===
Many victims were identified by clothing or personal items, such as a boy who was identified by the presence of the pull string from his favorite shirt in his jeans pocket. A student survivor recounted being in a makeshift morgue: "I saw fathers fight over dead children like dogs over a bone, yelling 'That's mine!' 'No, mine!' I saw children who looked like roadkill; you couldn't tell if it was a boy, girl, or what."

Fingerprinting experts were brought in to take fingerprints from bodies that were disfigured by the explosion. This method of identification was available because many inhabitants of the surrounding area had been fingerprinted at the Texas Centennial Exposition the previous summer.

== Aftermath ==
The surviving gymnasium was quickly converted into multiple classrooms. Inside tents and modified buildings, classes resumed ten days later, with the thirty surviving seniors completing the school year in the gymnasium. A new school was completed on the property in 1939 directly behind the location of the destroyed building. It remained known as the London School until 1965, when the London Independent School District consolidated with Gaston Independent School District. The name was changed to West Rusk High School, and the mascot was changed to the Raiders.

A lawsuit was brought against the school district and the Parade Gasoline Company, but the court ruled that neither could be held responsible. Superintendent W. C. Shaw was forced to resign amid talk of a lynching. Shaw had lost a son, a niece and a nephew in the explosion.

Eleanor Roosevelt sent a telegram to express her sympathy.

Adolf Hitler, who was the leader of Nazi Germany at the time, paid his respects in the form of a telegram, a copy of which is on display at the London Museum.

=== Investigation and legislation ===
Experts from the United States Bureau of Mines concluded that the connection to the residue gas line was faulty. The connection had allowed gas to leak into the school, and because natural gas is invisible and is odorless, the leak was unnoticed. The switch of an electric sander is believed to have caused a spark that ignited the gas-air mixture. To reduce the damage of future leaks, the Texas state legislature granted the Texas Railroad Commission regulatory authority "to adopt and enforce regulations for the odorization of natural gas in order to prevent such accidents." Within weeks of the explosion, thiol (mercaptan, an odorous sulfur compound) was added to natural gas. The strong odor of many thiols makes leaks quickly detectable.

Shortly after the disaster, the state legislature met in an emergency session and enacted the Engineering Registration Act (now rewritten as the Texas Engineering Practice Act). Public pressure was on the government to regulate the practice of engineering due to the faulty installation of the natural gas connection; Carolyn Jones, a nine-year-old survivor, spoke to the legislature about the importance of safety in schools. The use of the title "engineer" in Texas remains legally restricted to those who have been professionally certified by the state to practice engineering.

== Legacy ==
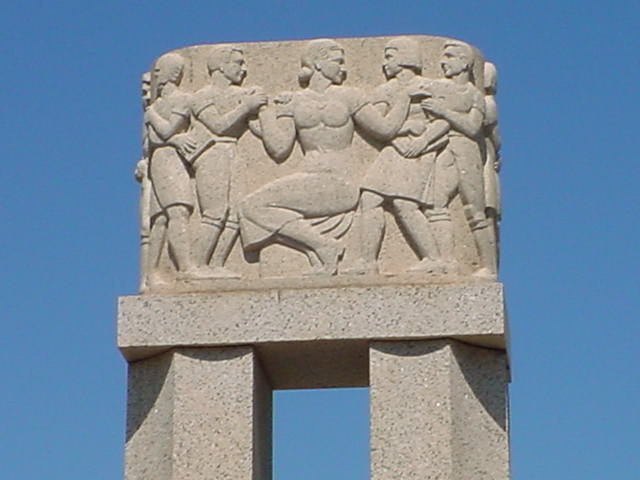
The top of the New London Cenotaph by sculptor Matchett Herring Coe

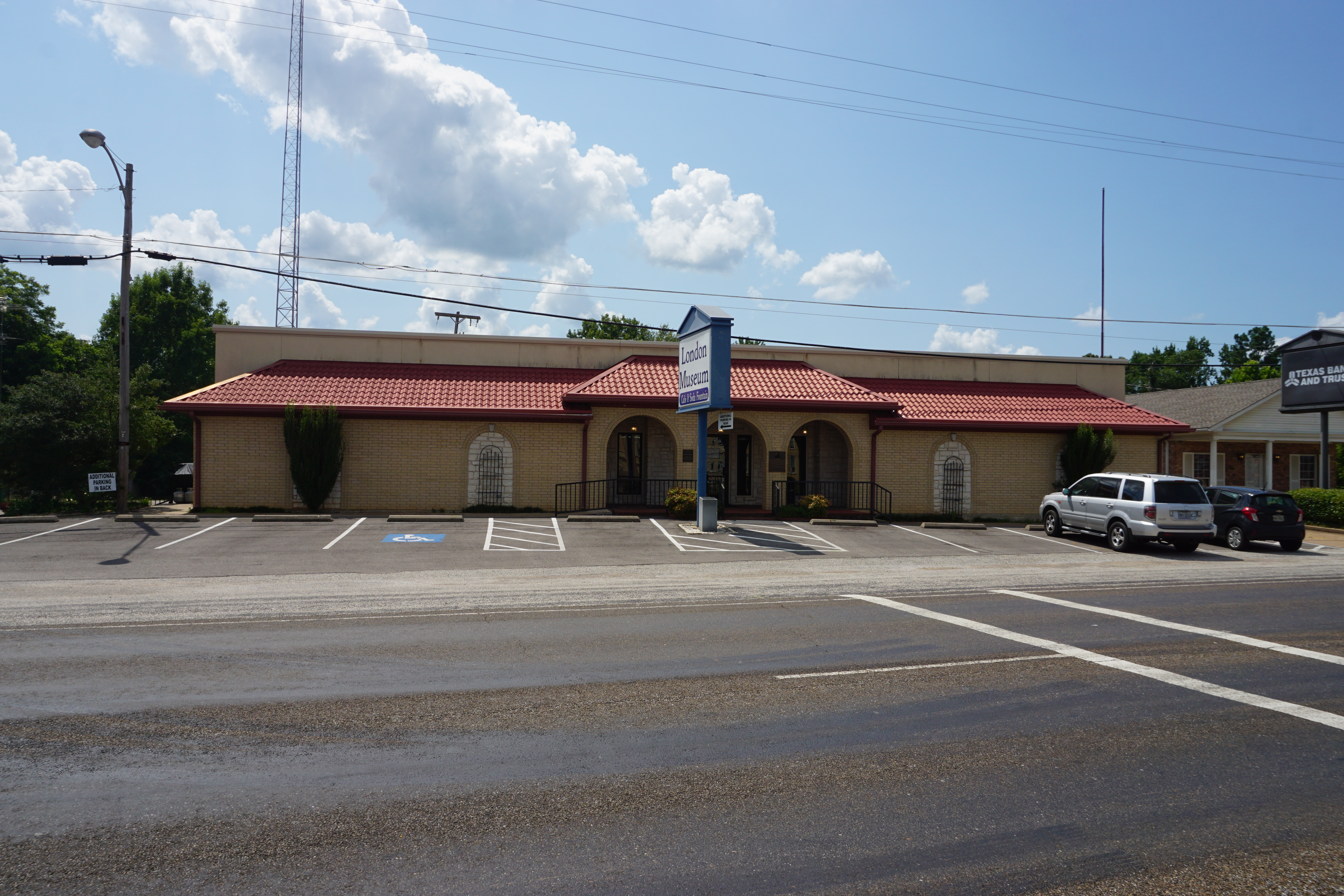
London Museum

Over the years, the New London School explosion received surprisingly little attention, despite the magnitude of the event. Explanations for this are speculative, but most center around residents' unwillingness to discuss the tragedy. L. V. Barber said of his father Lonnie, "I can remember newspaper people coming around every now and then, asking him questions about that day, but he never had much to say." A former student mentioned in 2007; "People were afraid to talk about it; almost no family in this community was unaffected, and whenever people would tell us about the explosion it would be sort of in whispers and don't say anything in front of so-and-so because they lost a sister."

In recent years, as the disaster has gained historical perspective, it has been increasingly covered by researchers and journalists. In 1973, Texas filmmaker Michael Brown produced a half-hour documentary on the explosion thought to be the first ever made on the subject. Called New London: The Day the Clock Stood Still, the film features survivors of the blast and their recollections of that day. The 50th anniversary of the event, in 1987, was commemorated in part by the release of a documentary, The Day A Generation Died, written, produced, and directed by Jerry Gumbert.

In 1998, The London Museum and Tea House, across the highway from the school site, opened. Its first curator, Mollie Ward, was an explosion survivor.

In March 2012, survivors and others gathered together at the town's rebuilt school in remembrance of the 75th anniversary of the disaster.

In 2012, Brown began work on a new documentary about the east Texas oil field discovery and its eventual role in the New London School disaster. The film, Shadow Across The Path, was released in 2017, and features excerpts from an interview that Brown conducted with Walter Cronkite in his New York office at CBS. The New London school explosion was then-20-year-old Cronkite's first national story. The documentary also features interviews with blast survivors.

== Museum ==
The London Museum and Tea Room is located at Texas State Highway 42. This small museum contains artifacts and stories of the horror of the New London School Explosion, which occurred on March 18, 1937. Museum tours were originally hosted by Mollie Ward, herself a survivor of the explosion who later served as mayor of New London for eight years, before her death in 2013 at the age of 86.

== See also ==
- Largest artificial non-nuclear explosions
- List of explosions
- Our Lady of the Angels School fire
- Collinwood school fire
- Bath School disaster
