= West Rusk County Consolidated Independent School District =

School district in Texas

Address
- 10705 S. Main New London, Texas, 75682; United States

District information
- Established: 1877; 149 years ago

Students and staff
- Enrollment: 851 (2013)
- Athletic conference: UIL
- District mascot: Raiders
- Colors: Columbia blue and white

Other information
- Website: www.westruskisd.org

West Rusk County Consolidated Independent School District is a public school district based in New London, Texas, United States. Almost all of New London is in this school district, and small portions of Overton are within the district.

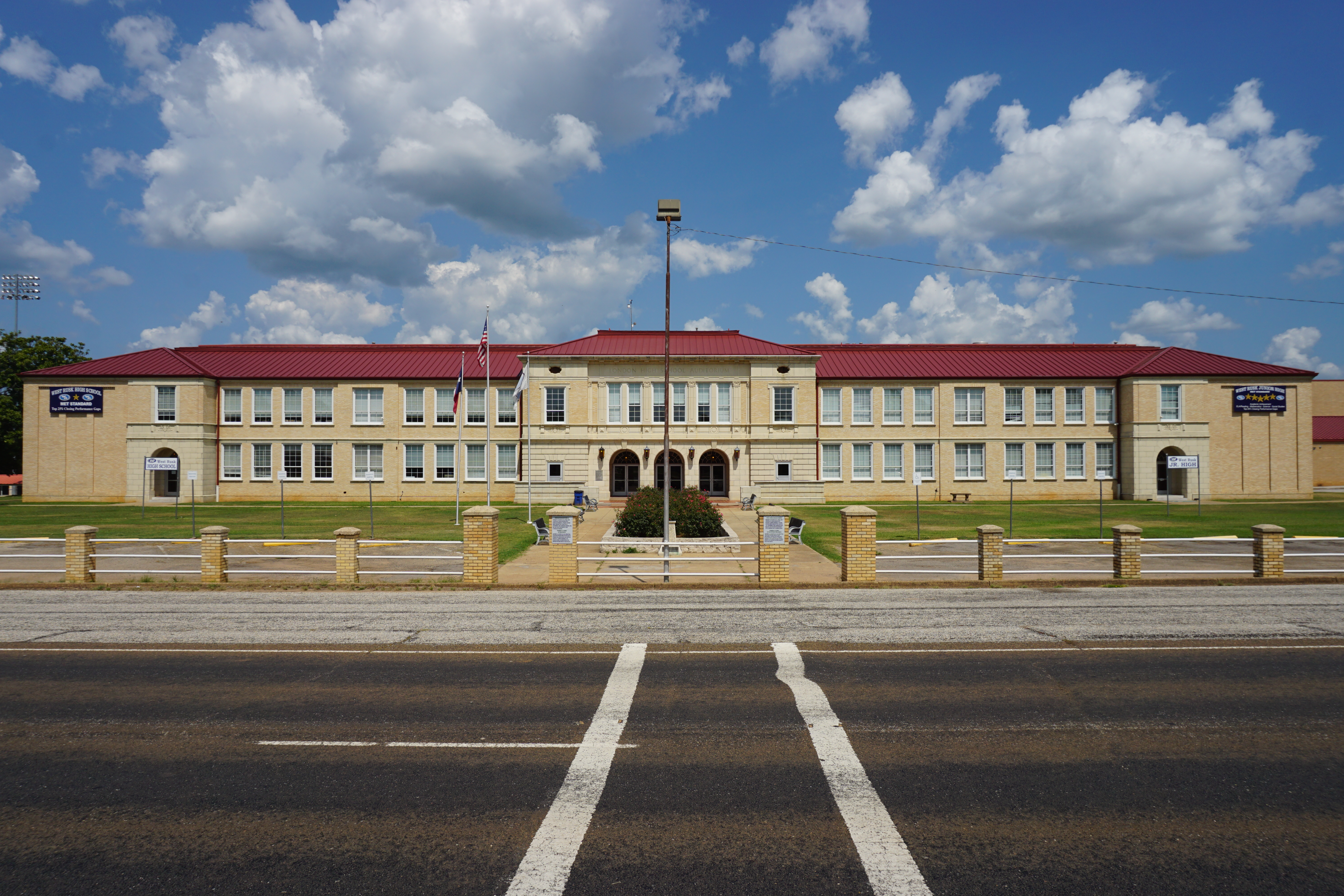
West Rusk Junior High School

There are four campuses in West Rusk Consolidated ISD - West Rusk High (Grades 9-12), West Rusk Middle (Grades 6-8), West Rusk Intermediate (3-5) and West Rusk Elementary (Grades PK-2).

== See also ==
- New London School explosion
