= New London, Texas =

- City
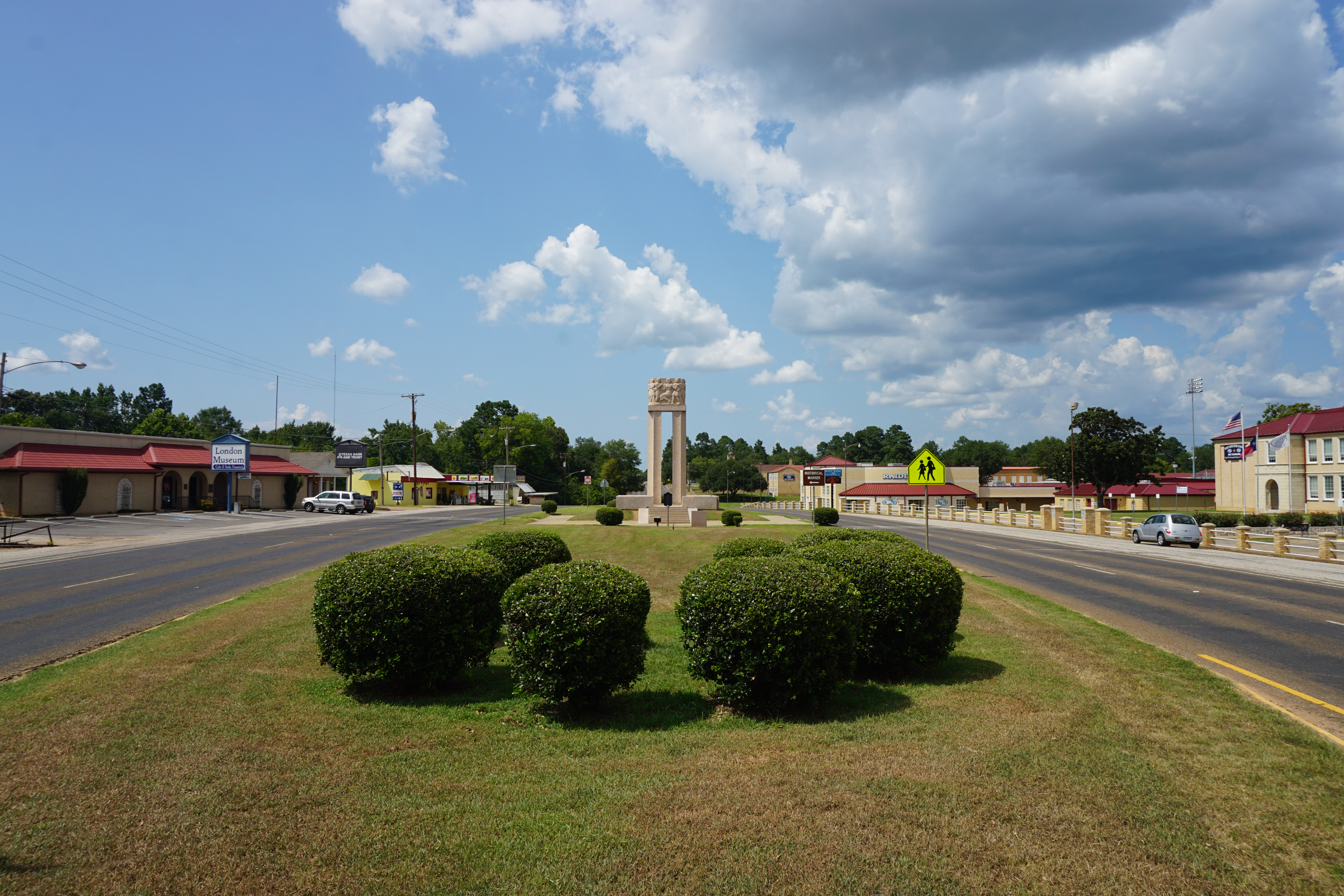
- Main Street in New London, Texas, featuring the New London Cenotaph
- Interactive map of New London, Texas
- Coordinates: 32°15′22″N 94°55′54″W
- Country: United States
- State: Texas
- County: Rusk

Area
  - Total: 8.62 sq mi (22.33 km^{2})
  - Land: 8.61 sq mi (22.29 km^{2})
  - Water: 0.012 sq mi (0.03 km^{2})
- Elevation: 538 ft (164 m)

Population (2020)
  - Total: 1,181
  - Density: 137.2/sq mi (52.98/km^{2})
- Time zone: UTC-6 (Central (CST))
  - Summer (DST): UTC-5 (CDT)
- ZIP code: 75682
- Area codes: 903, 430
- FIPS code: 48-51168
- GNIS feature ID: 2411233

New London is a city in Rusk County, Texas, United States. The population was 1181 at the 2020 census.

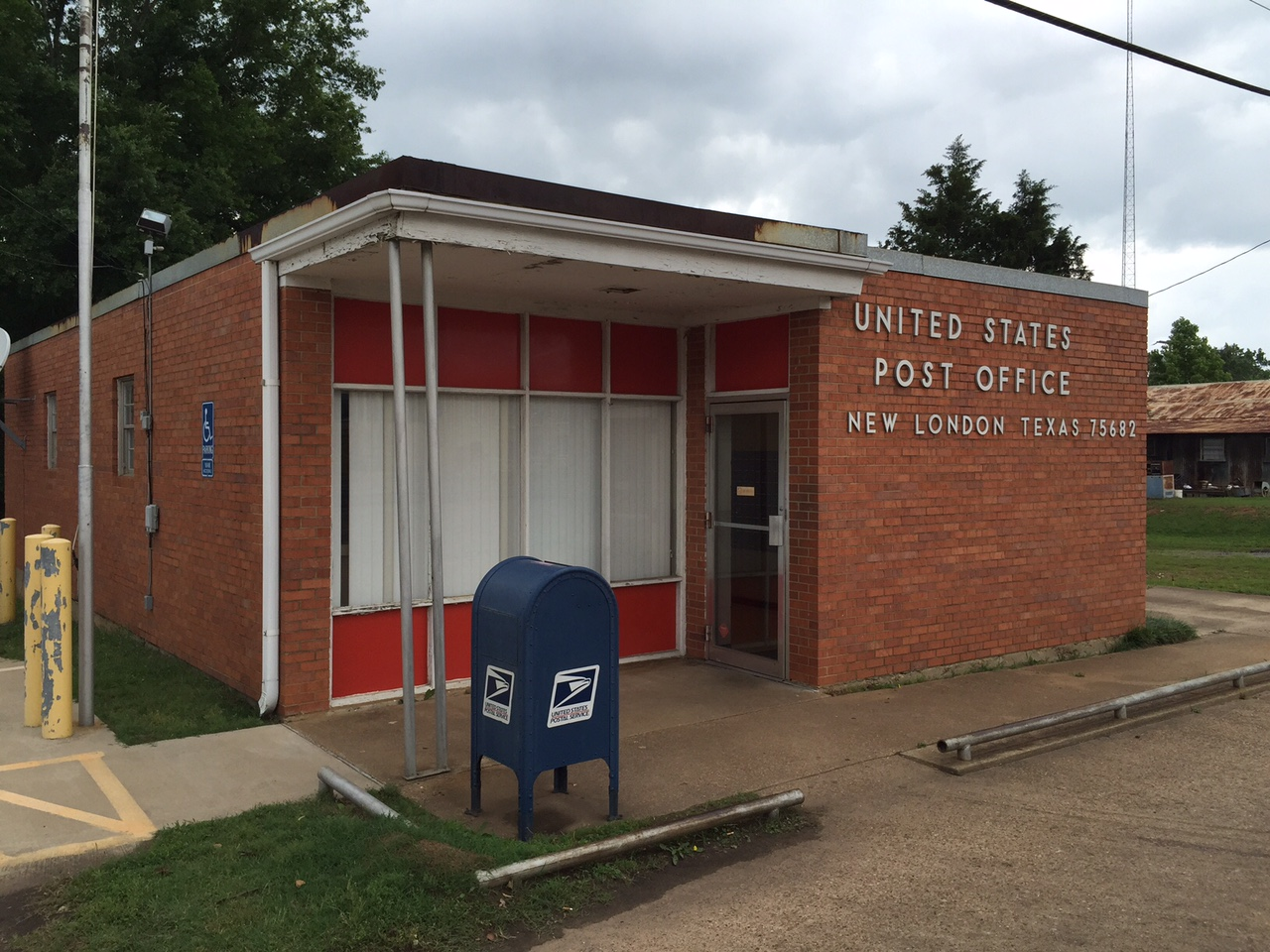
United States Post Office in New London, Texas

New London was originally known as just "London", but because Kimble County had already established a US Post Office station named London, the town changed its name to "New London" in 1931.

== History ==
On March 18, 1937, the London School Explosion killed 270 children and 24 adults. As a result of the disaster, Texas passed laws requiring natural gas to be mixed with a malodorant to provide early warning of any leak and laws requiring pipe workers to be properly licensed. Other states quickly followed. Eventually, malodorant in natural gas became a legal requirement in the United States.

=== Holt Stadium in London, Texas ===
In 1953, the unincorporated community of London, Texas, was home to a notably modern Little League stadium known as Holt Stadium. While a slight possibility exists that this could refer to a different, obscure ghost town, the majority of historical evidence confirms that this 'London' was the community officially known since 1931 as New London. The venue was constructed at a cost reported to be "in excess of 30,000"(361,007 in 2025 dollars), seated approximately 700 spectators, and was described at the time as "the latest thing in Little League parks," highlighting its advanced features and substantial scale for such a small community.

The construction of Holt Stadium reflected both the popularity of youth baseball in East Texas and the economic influence of the region’s oil industry. As a major community investment, it served not only as a sports venue but also as a symbol of local pride. Over time, however, the story of this unusually high-cost Little League facility in rural Texas has faded from public memory.

== Geography ==
According to the United States Census Bureau, the city has a total area of 8.6 square miles (22 km^{2}), of which 8.6 square miles (22 km^{2}) is land and 0.12% is water.

== Demographics ==
Historical population
Census	Pop.	Note	%±
1970	899		—
1980	942		4.8%
1990	926		−1.7%
2000	987		6.6%
2010	998		1.1%
2020	958		−4.0%
U.S. Decennial Census

=== 2020 census ===
As of the 2020 census, New London had a population of 958 and a median age of 41.8 years.

22.9% of residents were under the age of 18 and 21.0% were 65 years of age or older; for every 100 females there were 89.3 males, and for every 100 females age 18 and over there were 87.6 males age 18 and over.

0.0% of residents lived in urban areas, while 100.0% lived in rural areas.

There were 340 households in New London, of which 36.5% had children under the age of 18 living in them. Of all households, 57.1% were married-couple households, 15.0% were households with a male householder and no spouse or partner present, and 24.4% were households with a female householder and no spouse or partner present. About 22.1% of all households were made up of individuals and 10.6% had someone living alone who was 65 years of age or older.

There were 390 housing units, of which 12.8% were vacant. The homeowner vacancy rate was 1.7% and the rental vacancy rate was 5.1%.

Racial composition as of the 2020 census
Race	Number	Percent
White	719	75.1%
Black or African American	82	8.6%
American Indian and Alaska Native	4	0.4%
Asian	7	0.7%
Native Hawaiian and Other Pacific Islander	1	0.1%
Some other race	65	6.8%
Two or more races	80	8.4%
Hispanic or Latino (of any race)	116	12.1%

=== 2000 census ===
As of the census of 2000, there were 987 people, 352 households, and 268 families residing in the city. The population density was 114.3 inhabitants per square mile (44.1/km^{2}). There were 388 housing units at an average density of 44.9 per square mile (17.3/km^{2}). The racial makeup of the city was 91.59% White, 4.86% African American, 0.10% Native American, 0.10% Asian, 2.33% from other races, and 1.01% from two or more races. Hispanic or Latino of any race were 4.86% of the population.

There were 352 households, out of which 34.7% had children under the age of 18 living with them, 60.2% were married couples living together, 11.6% had a female householder with no husband present, and 23.6% were non-families. 22.2% of all households were made up of individuals, and 13.1% had someone living alone who was 65 years of age or older. The average household size was 2.65 and the average family size was 3.09.

In the city, the population was spread out, with 28.3% under the age of 18, 6.9% from 18 to 24, 22.5% from 25 to 44, 23.3% from 45 to 64, and 19.0% who were 65 years of age or older. The median age was 39 years. For every 100 females, there were 89.4 males. For every 100 females age 18 and over, there were 82.0 males.

The median income for a household in the city was $28,984, and the median income for a family was $36,979. Males had a median income of $27,981 versus $15,313 for females. The per capita income for the city was $16,009. About 13.5% of families and 16.3% of the population were below the poverty line, including 20.2% of those under age 18 and 10.7% of those age 65 or over.

== Education ==
Most of the city of New London is served by the West Rusk Independent School District. A very small portion of the city is within the Overton ISD.

Areas in West Rusk ISD and Overton ISD are in the service area of Kilgore Junior College.

== In culture ==
The 2015 historical novel Out of Darkness by Ashley Hope Pérez depicts 1930s New London.

== Notable person ==
- Sandy Duncan (born 1946), American actress, comedian, dancer and singer
