= 2026 Fiesta Bowl (January) =

Postseason college football bowl game

2026 Vrbo Fiesta Bowl
- College Football Playoff Semifinal; 55th Fiesta Bowl
| Miami Hurricanes | Ole Miss Rebels |
| (12–2) | (13–1) |
| ACC | SEC |
| 31 | 27 |
| Head coach: Mario Cristobal | Head coach: Pete Golding |
| AP / Coaches / CFP; 10 / 10 / 10 | AP / Coaches / CFP; 6 / 6 / 6 |
| | 1 | 2 | 3 | 4 | Total |
|---|---|---|---|---|---|
| Miami | 3 | 14 | 0 | 14 | 31 |
| Ole Miss | 0 | 13 | 3 | 11 | 27 |
- Date: January 8, 2026
- Season: 2025
- Stadium: State Farm Stadium
- Location: Glendale, Arizona
- MVP: Offensive: Carson Beck (QB, Miami); Defensive: Jakobe Thomas (S, Miami)
- Favorite: Even
- National anthem: The War and Treaty
- Referee: Ron Snodgrass (Big Ten)
- Attendance: 67,928

United States TV coverage
- Network: ESPN
- Announcers: Chris Fowler (play-by-play), Kirk Herbstreit (analyst), Holly Rowe, Laura Rutledge (sideline reporters) and Bill LeMonnier (rules expert)

International TV coverage
- Network: ESPN Deportes and ESPN Brazil
- Announcers: ESPN Deportes: Ciro Procuna (play-by-play), Javier Trejo-Garay and Ramiro Pruneda (analysts); ESPN Brazil: Conrado Giulietti (play-by-play), Weinny Eirado (analyst) and Guilherme Cohen (rules expert)

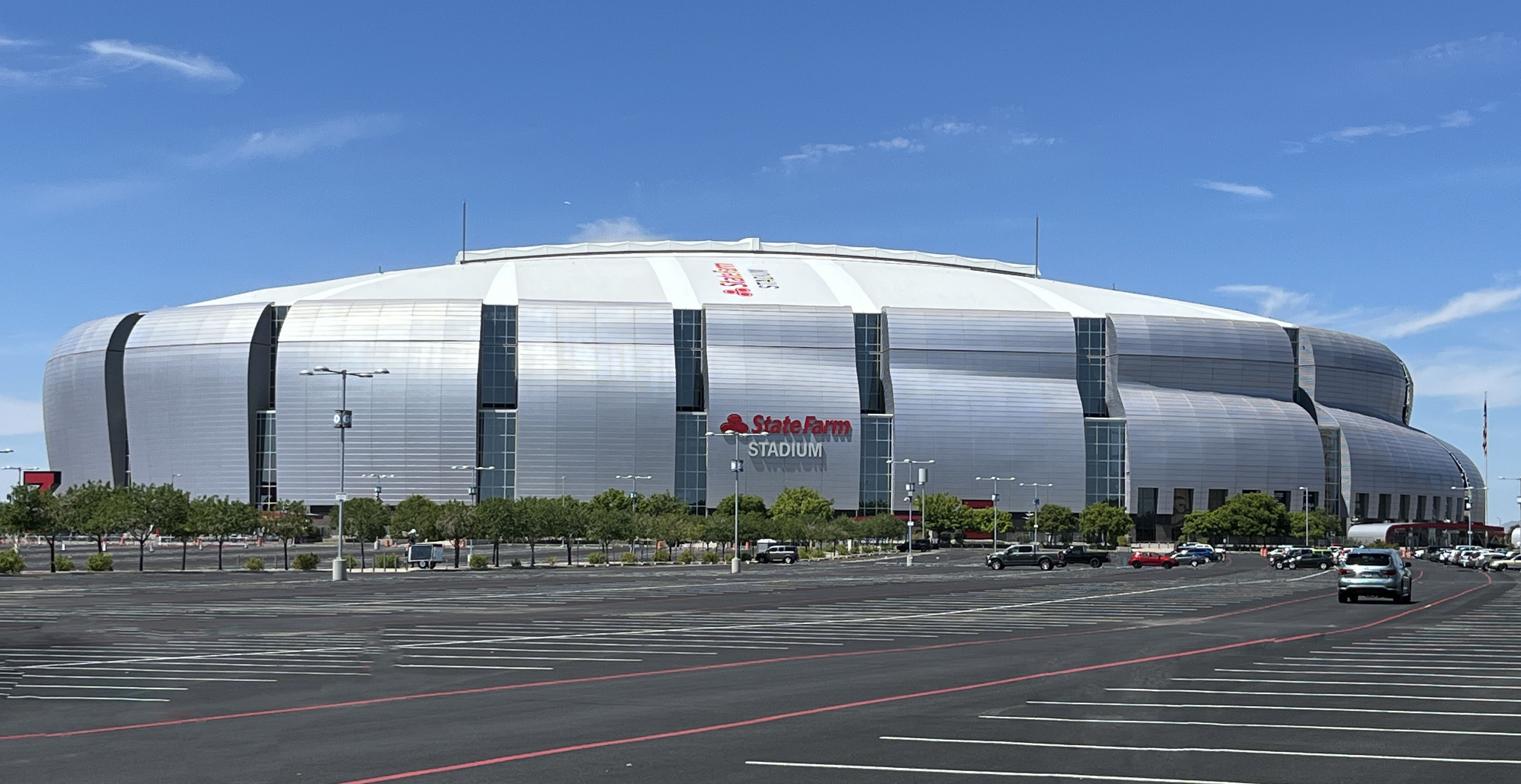
State Farm Stadium in Glendale, Arizona, hosted the Fiesta Bowl.

The 2026 Fiesta Bowl was a college football bowl game played on January 8, 2026, at State Farm Stadium in Glendale, Arizona. The 55th annual Fiesta Bowl was one of the 2025–26 bowl games concluding the 2025 FBS football season, and served as a semifinal of the College Football Playoff (CFP). The game began at approximately 5:30 p.m. MST and aired on ESPN. The game was sponsored by vacation rental marketplace Vrbo and was officially known as the Vrbo Fiesta Bowl.

The Miami Hurricanes defeated the Ole Miss Rebels, 31–27.

== Background ==
The 2026 Fiesta Bowl was a semifinal game of the College Football Playoff (CFP). The game featured the winner of the Cotton Bowl, the Miami Hurricanes, and the winner of the Sugar Bowl, the Ole Miss Rebels. The winner of this game advanced to the 2026 College Football Playoff National Championship game to face the winner of the Peach Bowl.

Quarterfinals
Jan 1 – Sugar Bowl
3 | Georgia | 34
6 | Ole Miss | 39
Dec 31 – Cotton Bowl
2 | Ohio State | 14
10 | Miami (FL) | 24

Fiesta Bowl
6 | Ole Miss | 27
10 | Miami (FL) | 31

== Teams ==
Miami of the Atlantic Coast Conference (ACC) faced Ole Miss from the Southeastern Conference (SEC). Miami previously appeared in, and lost, four prior Fiesta Bowls—the 1985, 1987, 1994, and 2003 editions. This was the first Fiesta Bowl for Ole Miss. This was the fourth meeting between the two teams and their first game in nearly 75 years; in their three prior meetings, Ole Miss won twice (in 1936 and 1940) and Miami won once (in 1951).

=== Miami Hurricanes ===
Miami opened their season with five consecutive wins, including three over ranked opponents: Notre Dame, South Florida, and Florida State. They suffered two losses in their next three games, to Louisville and SMU, then won their final four regular-season games. The Hurricanes were seeded 10th in the CFP, and defeated Texas A&M in College Station, Texas, in a first-round contest. Miami entered the Cotton Bowl quarterfinal with an overall record of 11–2, where they defeated Ohio State, 24–14, to advance to the Fiesta Bowl.

=== Ole Miss Rebels ===
Ole Miss began the season as the No. 21 ranked team in the AP Poll. The Rebels began the season with a 63–7 rout of Georgia State before earning their first SEC victory of the season on the road against Kentucky. After starting quarterback Austin Simmons was injured against Kentucky, Ferris State transfer Trinidad Chambliss was named the Rebels' starter moving forward. After outlasting Arkansas and soundly handling Tulane, Ole Miss faced undefeated LSU in the Magnolia Bowl. The Rebels prevailed 24–19 over the Tigers and vaulted to No. 4 in the AP Poll. Following a bye week, Ole Miss defeated Washington State before heading to Athens to face Georgia, where the Rebels were outlasted 43–35. Following their first defeat of the season, Ole Miss rebounded with a 34–26 road victory at Oklahoma. The Rebels then returned home for a three-game homestand that included victories over South Carolina, The Citadel, and Florida. Following their second bye week, Ole Miss faced off against rival Mississippi State in the Egg Bowl, with the Rebels winning 38–19. Two days following the Rebels' Egg Bowl victory, head coach Lane Kiffin announced his departure from the program to become the next head coach at LSU. After Kiffin's departure, the team announced that defensive coordinator Pete Golding would take over as the head coach for the College Football Playoffs. As the No. 6 seed in the playoffs, the Rebels rematched with Tulane, defeating the Green Wave, 41–10, to move on to the quarterfinals. In the Sugar Bowl, Ole Miss defeated Georgia, 39–34, to advance to this semifinal.

== Game summary ==
College Football Playoff Semifinal at the 2026 Vrbo Fiesta Bowl

| Quarter | 1 | 2 | 3 | 4 | Total |
|---|---|---|---|---|---|
| (10) No. 10 Miami (FL) | 3 | 14 | 0 | 14 | 31 |
| (6) No. 6 Ole Miss | 0 | 13 | 3 | 11 | 27 |

at State Farm Stadium • Glendale, Arizona

- Date: Thursday, January 8, 2026
- Game time: 5:30 p.m. MST
- Game weather: n/a (indoor)
- Game attendance: 67,928
- Referee: Rod Snodgrass
- TV announcers (ESPN): Chris Fowler (play-by-play), Kirk Herbstreit (analyst), Holly Rowe and Laura Rutledge (sideline reporters)

The first quarter contained only one score, a 38-yard Carter Davis field goal on Miami's first drive of the game. Both of Ole Miss's first two drives ended with a three-and-out, though a 73-yard Kewan Lacy rush on the second play of their third drive gave the Rebels a 7–3 lead. The teams traded scoring drives for much of the remainder of the second quarter. After Ole Miss's two-play touchdown drive, Miami drove 75 yards in 15 plays and scored on a CharMar Brown touchdown rush. The Rebels then tied the game at 10 points apiece on a 42-yard Lucas Carneiro field goal, though Miami reestablished a seven-point lead on a 52-yard touchdown pass from Beck to Keelan Marion with 2:18 remaining in the half. Following a punt by each team, Carneiro made a 58-yard field goal with eleven seconds left and Miami took a 17–13 lead into halftime.

Both teams missed a 51-yard field goal on their respective first drives of the second half. A 13-play Miami drive was cut short when Carson Beck's pass was intercepted by Kapena Gushiken at the Ole Miss 14-yard line; the Rebels then drove from that spot to the Miami 37-yard line, where Carneiro made a 54-yard field goal to narrow the Hurricanes' lead to one point. After a Miami punt, Carneiro gave Ole Miss the lead with a 21-yard field goal with seven minutes remaining. A 17-yard Mark Fletcher run on the second play of Miami's ensuing drive set up a 36-yard touchdown pass from Beck to Toney, giving Miami a 24–19 lead with 5:04 to play in the game. A pass interference penalty on Ja'Boree Antoine extended Ole Miss's next possession, and the Rebels scored on a 24-yard touchdown pass from Trinidad Chambliss to Dae'Quan Wright with three minutes left. Up by one point, they went for two and scored on a Chambliss pass to Caleb Odom. Miami's final drive was 15 plays and ended with a 3-yard touchdown run by Beck, giving Miami a 31–27 lead with 18 seconds left that held to give Miami a championship berth.

== Statistics ==
Team statistical comparison
| Statistic | Miami (FL) | Ole Miss |
|---|---|---|
| First downs | 28 | 23 |
| First downs rushing | 11 | 5 |
| First downs passing | 14 | 14 |
| First downs penalty | 3 | 4 |
| Third down efficiency | 11–19 | 2–10 |
| Fourth down efficiency | 2–2 | 0–0 |
| Total plays–net yards | 88–459 | 60–398 |
| Rushing attempts–net yards | 50–191 | 21–121 |
| Yards per rush | 3.8 | 5.8 |
| Yards passing | 268 | 277 |
| Pass completions–attempts | 23–37 | 23–37 |
| Interceptions thrown | 1 | 0 |
| Punt returns–total yards | 1–2 | 0–0 |
| Kickoff returns–total yards | 0–0 | 0–0 |
| Punts–average yardage | 3–48.0 | 3–46.0 |
| Fumbles–lost | 1–0 | 0–0 |
| Penalties–yards | 10–74 | 4–34 |
| Time of possession | 41:22 | 18:38 |

Miami (FL) statistics
Hurricanes passing
| | C–A | Yds | TD–INT |
|---|---|---|---|
| Carson Beck | 23–37 | 268 | 2–1 |
Hurricanes rushing
| | Car | Yds | TD |
| Mark Fletcher Jr. | 22 | 133 | 0 |
| CharMar Brown | 14 | 54 | 1 |
| Malachi Toney | 2 | 11 | 0 |
| Carson Beck | 12 | -6 | 1 |
Hurricanes receiving
| | Rec | Yds | TD |
| Keelan Marion | 7 | 114 | 1 |
| Malachi Toney | 5 | 81 | 1 |
| CJ Daniels | 4 | 26 | 0 |
| Elija Lofton | 1 | 15 | 0 |
| Alex Bauman | 2 | 11 | 0 |
| Joshua Moore | 1 | 11 | 0 |
| CharMar Brown | 2 | 7 | 0 |
| Joshisa Trader | 1 | 3 | 0 |

Ole Miss statistics
Rebels passing
| | C–A | Yds | TD–INT |
|---|---|---|---|
| Trinidad Chambliss | 23–37 | 277 | 1–0 |
Rebels rushing
| | Car | Yds | TD |
| Kewan Lacy | 11 | 103 | 1 |
| Logan Diggs | 4 | 10 | 0 |
| Trinidad Chambliss | 5 | 7 | 0 |
| Winston Watkins | 1 | 1 | 0 |
Rebels receiving
| | Rec | Yds | TD |
| De'Zhaun Stribling | 5 | 77 | 0 |
| Cayden Lee | 5 | 67 | 0 |
| Dae'Quan Wright | 3 | 64 | 1 |
| Harrison Wallace III | 4 | 40 | 0 |
| Logan Diggs | 2 | 11 | 0 |
| Deuce Alexander | 1 | 7 | 0 |
| Kewan Lacy | 1 | 4 | 0 |
| Caleb Odom | 1 | 4 | 0 |
| Winston Watkins | 1 | 3 | 0 |
