= 2026 Sugar Bowl =

Postseason college football bowl game

2026 Allstate Sugar Bowl
- College Football Playoff Quarterfinal; 92nd Sugar Bowl
Ole Miss Rebels	Georgia Bulldogs
(12–1)	(12–1)
SEC	SEC
39	34
Head coach: Pete Golding	Head coach: Kirby Smart
AP / Coaches / CFP; 6 / 6 / 6	AP / Coaches / CFP; 2 / 2 / 3
	1	2	3	4	Total
Ole Miss	6	6	7	20	39
Georgia	0	21	3	10	34
- Date: January 1, 2026
- Season: 2025
- Stadium: Caesars Superdome
- Location: New Orleans, Louisiana
- MOP: Trinidad Chambliss (QB, Ole Miss); Will Echoles (DT, Ole Miss)
- Favorite: Georgia by 6.5
- National anthem: Irma Thomas
- Referee: Jeff Servinski (Big Ten)
- Attendance: 68,371

United States TV coverage
- Network: ESPN
- Announcers: Sean McDonough (play-by-play), Greg McElroy (analyst), Laura Rutledge, and Molly McGrath (sideline reporters)
- Nielsen ratings: 18.7 million viewers

International TV coverage
- Network: ESPN Brazil and ESPN Deportes
- Announcers: ESPN Brazil: Matheus Pinheiro (play-by-play) and Weinny Eirado (analyst); ESPN Deportes Javier Trejo Garay (play-by-play) and Ramiro Pruneda (analyst)

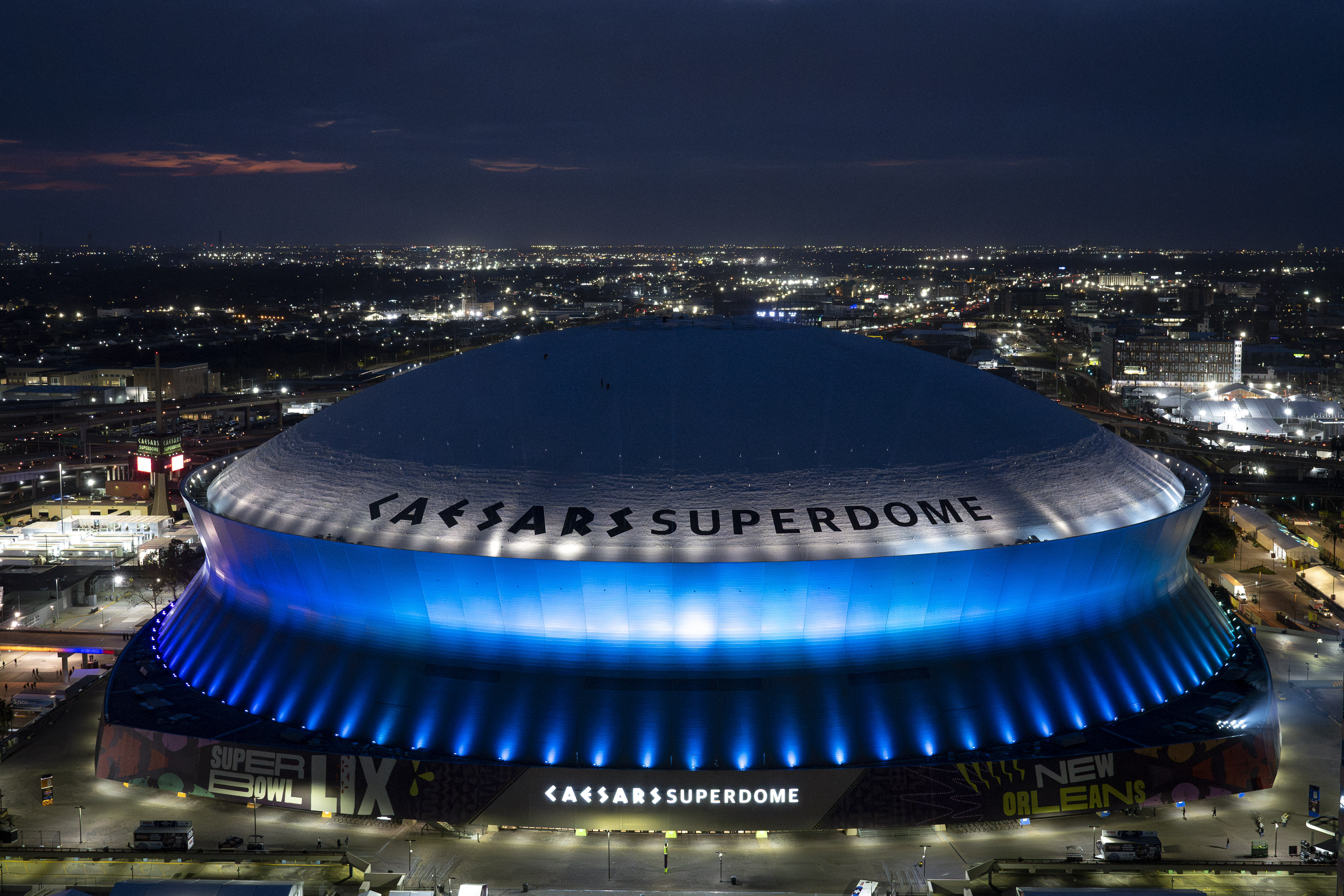
Caesars Superdome in New Orleans, Louisiana, site of the game

The 2026 Sugar Bowl was a college football bowl game played on January 1, 2026, at Caesars Superdome in New Orleans. The 92nd annual Sugar Bowl was one of the College Football Playoff (CFP) quarterfinals. The game began at approximately 8:00 p.m. EST and was broadcast on ESPN. It was one of the 2025–26 bowl games concluding the 2025 FBS football season, with the winner advancing to the CFP semifinals. Sponsored by the Allstate insurance company, the game was officially known as the Allstate Sugar Bowl.

In a rematch of a Southeastern Conference (SEC) regular-season game, the Ole Miss Rebels defeated the Georgia Bulldogs, 39–34.

== Background ==
The 2026 Sugar Bowl was a quarterfinal game for the College Football Playoff (CFP). Georgia was ranked third in the CFP rankings and, being one of the top four teams, received a first-round bye. The 11th seed, Tulane, and 6th seed, Ole Miss, competed for the other spot in the Sugar Bowl, with Ole Miss winning by a 41–10 score.

First round			Sugar Bowl
			3	Georgia	34
11	Tulane	10	6	Ole Miss	39
6	Ole Miss	41

== Teams ==
Georgia and Ole Miss met during a Southeastern Conference (SEC) regular-season game, which Georgia won, 43–35. This was the first Sugar Bowl with two SEC teams since the 1964 edition, which also featured Ole Miss.

=== Georgia Bulldogs ===
Georgia began the season as the No. 5 ranked team in the AP Poll. The Bulldogs began the season with two wins over nonconference opponents Marshall and Austin Peay before earning their first SEC win of the season on the road against Tennessee. They returned home to face Alabama, losing 24–21, their first loss at home since 2019. The Bulldogs rebounded by soundly defeating Kentucky the following week and then knocking off rival Auburn on the road. They then outlasted Ole Miss 43–35, jumping to No. 5 in the AP Poll entering a bye week. Following the bye week, Georgia defeated rival Florida in Jacksonville and Mississippi State in Starkville. The Bulldogs then returned home for a two-game home stretch, including a 35–10 victory over Texas and a 35–3 win over Charlotte. In the final game of the regular season, Georgia defeated rival Georgia Tech, 16–9, at Mercedes-Benz Stadium. In the 2025 SEC Championship Game, the Bulldogs avenged their lone loss to Alabama, defeating the Crimson Tide, 28–7, to become SEC champions and clinch an automatic bid to the College Football Playoff as one of the top five highest-ranked conference champions.

This was the 13th Sugar Bowl appearance for the Bulldogs, with a record of 5–7 in prior editions. The program's latest appearance in the Sugar Bowl was the 2025 game, losing to Notre Dame, 23–10. Georgia entered the game as the SEC champions, with a 12–1 record (7–1 in conference).

=== Ole Miss Rebels ===
Ole Miss began the season as the No. 21 ranked team in the AP Poll. The Rebels began the season with a 63–7 rout of Georgia State before earning their first SEC victory of the season on the road against Kentucky. After starting quarterback Austin Simmons was injured against Kentucky, Ferris State transfer Trinidad Chambliss was named the Rebels' starter moving forward. After outlasting Arkansas and soundly handling Tulane, Ole Miss faced undefeated LSU in the Magnolia Bowl. The Rebels prevailed 24–19 over the Tigers and vaulted to No. 4 in the AP Poll. Following a bye week, Ole Miss defeated Washington State before heading to Athens to face Georgia, where the Rebels were outlasted 43–35. Following their first defeat of the season, Ole Miss rebounded with a 34–26 road victory at Oklahoma. The Rebels then returned home for a three-game homestand that included victories over South Carolina, The Citadel, and Florida. Following their second bye week, Ole Miss faced off against rival Mississippi State in the Egg Bowl, with the Rebels winning 38–19. Two days following the Rebels' Egg Bowl victory, head coach Lane Kiffin announced his departure from the program to become the next head coach at LSU. After Kiffin's departure, the team announced that defensive coordinator Pete Golding would take over as the head coach for the College Football Playoffs. As the No. 6 seed in the playoffs, the Rebels rematched with Tulane, defeating the Green Wave, 41–10, to move on to the quarterfinals.

This was the 11th Sugar Bowl appearance for the Rebels, with a record of 6–4 in prior editions. The program's latest appearance in the Sugar Bowl was the 2022 game, losing to Baylor, 21–7. Ole Miss entered the game with a 12–1 record (7–1 in conference).

== Game summary ==
College Football Playoff Quarterfinal at the 2026 Sugar Bowl

Quarter	1	2	3	4	Total
(6) No. 6 Ole Miss	6	6	7	20	39
(3) No. 3 Georgia	0	21	3	10	34

at Caesars Superdome • New Orleans, Louisiana

- Date: Thursday January 1, 2026
- Game time: 8:00 p.m. EST
- Game weather: n/a (indoor)
- Game attendance: 68,371
- Referee: Jeff Servinski
- TV announcers (ESPN): Sean McDonough (play by play), Greg McElroy (analyst), Molly McGrath and Laura Rutledge (sideline reporters)
- Boxscore

Each team's opening drive ended with a punt, and Ole Miss scored first with Lucas Carneiro field goals of 55 and 56 yards, respectively, on their following two drives. After a second Georgia punt, the Bulldogs scored on a 12-yard Gunner Stockton touchdown rush early in the second quarter. Ole Miss retook the lead with a 3-yard touchdown pass from Trinidad Chambliss to Luke Hasz on the eighth play of their ensuing drive, and Georgia responded with a 12-play scoring drive over the following six and a half minutes which ended with another Stockton touchdown rush. The Georgia lead grew to nine points on Ole Miss's next drive as the result of a Kewan Lacy fumble, which was returned by Daylen Everette for a touchdown with 2:34 remaining in the half. No scoring took place on the final three possessions of the half, and Georgia entered halftime leading 21–12.

A Georgia punt and an Ole Miss turnover on downs began the third quarter, after which Georgia drove to the Rebels' 37-yard line but failed to score after Peyton Woodring's 55-yard field goal attempt was missed. The next three possessions all resulted in scoring: Georgia added a 37-yard Woodring field goal and Lacy rushed for touchdowns of 7 and 6 yards for Ole Miss. The Rebels opted to attempt a two-point conversion after the second Lacy score, which they converted on a pass from Chambliss to Harrison Wallace III, giving them a 27–24 lead. Following a Georgia turnover on downs at their own 23-yard line, Ole Miss scored in one play on a pass from Chambliss to Dae'Quan Wright to further extend their lead to ten points. Georgia scored on a pass from Stockton to Zachariah Branch two minutes later and forced an Ole Miss three-and-out to retake possession with 5:26 left in the game. They drove to the Ole Miss 6-yard line and tied the game at 34 on a 24-yard Woodring field goal. Ole Miss's final possession finished with a 47-yard Carneiro field goal, giving Ole Miss a three-point lead with six seconds left. On the ensuing kickoff return, a Georgia lateral hit the pylon, resulting in a safety and giving Ole Miss a 39–34 victory.

Scoring summary

Quarter	Time	Drive			Team	Scoring information	Score	
Quarter	Time	Plays	Yards	TOP	Team	Scoring information	Ole Miss	Georgia
1	5:47	11	60	4:27	Ole Miss	55-yard field goal by Lucas Carneiro	3	0
1	2:13	7	42	2:10	Ole Miss	56-yard field goal by Lucas Carneiro	6	0
2	13:37	7	75	3:36	Georgia	Gunner Stockton 12-yard touchdown run, Peyton Woodring kick good	6	7
2	10:33	8	75	3:04	Ole Miss	Luke Hasz 3-yard touchdown reception from Trinidad Chambliss, 2-point run failed	12	7
2	4:05	12	75	6:28	Georgia	Gunner Stockton 1-yard touchdown run, Peyton Woodring kick good	12	14
2	2:34	4	22	1:31	Georgia	Fumble recovery returned 47 yards for touchdown by Daylen Everette, Peyton Woodring kick good	12	21
3	4:51	7	63	3:42	Ole Miss	Kewan Lacy 7-yard touchdown run, Lucas Carneiro kick good	19	21
3	0:30	10	56	4:21	Georgia	37-yard field goal by Peyton Woodring	19	24
4	11:29	8	75	4:01	Ole Miss	Kewan Lacy 5-yard touchdown run, 2-point pass good	27	24
4	9:02	2	23	0:29	Ole Miss	Harrison Wallace III 13-yard touchdown reception from Trinidad Chambliss, Lucas Carneiro kick good	34	24
4	7:03	6	75	1:59	Georgia	Zachariah Branch 18-yard touchdown reception from Gunner Stockton, Peyton Woodring kick good	34	31
4	0:56	12	58	4:37	Georgia	24-yard field goal by Peyton Woodring	34	34
4	0:06	7	45	0:50	Ole Miss	47-yard field goal by Lucas Carneiro	37	34
4	0:01				Ole Miss	Georgia fumble through the end zone for a safety	39	34
"TOP" = time of possession. For other American football terms, see Glossary of American football.							39	34

== Statistics ==
Team statistical comparison
Statistic	Ole Miss	Georgia
First downs	22	23
First downs rushing	7	8
First downs passing	13	11
First downs penalty	2	4
Third down efficiency	5–14	3–13
Fourth down efficiency	1–2	2–3
Total plays–net yards	73–473	70–343
Rushing attempts–net yards	27–111	37–124
Yards per rush	4.1	3.4
Yards passing	362	219
Pass completions–attempts	30–46	19–33
Interceptions thrown	0	0
Punt returns–total yards	0–0	2–23
Kickoff returns–total yards	0–0	1–65
Punts–average yardage	3–48.0	4–48.5
Fumbles–lost	1–1	1–1
Penalties–yards	4–48	4–38
Time of possession	27:28	32:32

Ole Miss statistics
Rebels passing
	C–A	Yds	TD–INT
Trinidad Chambliss	30–46	362	2–0
Rebels rushing
	Car	Yds	TD
Kewan Lacy	22	98	2
Trinidad Chambliss	4	14	0
Deuce Alexander	1	−1	0
Rebels receiving
	Rec	Yds	TD
Harrison Wallace III	9	156	1
De'Zhaun Stribling	7	122	0
Cayden Lee	4	19	0
Dae'Quan Wright	2	18	0
Deuce Alexander	2	13	0
Kewan Lacy	2	12	0
Logan Diggs	1	8	0
Winston Watkins Jr.	1	7	0
Caleb Odom	1	4	0
Luke Hasz	1	3	1

Georgia statistics
Bulldogs passing
	C–A	Yds	TD–INT
Gunner Stockton	18–31	203	1–0
Landon Roldan	1–1	16	0–0
Dillon Bell	0–1	0	0–0
Bulldogs rushing
	Car	Yds	TD
Nate Frazier	15	86	0
Gunner Stockton	13	20	2
Cash Jones	2	11	0
Chauncey Bowens	5	10	0
Josh McCray	2	−3	0
Bulldogs receiving
	Rec	Yds	TD
Zachariah Branch	8	67	1
Cash Jones	2	45	0
Nate Frazier	3	42	0
Colbie Young	3	22	0
Lawson Luckie	1	20	0
Sacovie White-Helton	1	20	0
Oscar Delp	1	16	0

== See also ==
- List of college football post-season games that were rematches of regular season games
