= 2025 Ole Miss Rebels football team =

American college football season

2025 Ole Miss Rebels football

Sugar Bowl champion

CFP First Round, W 41–10 vs. Tulane Sugar Bowl (CFP Quarterfinal), W 39–34 vs. Georgia Fiesta Bowl (CFP Semifinal), L 27–31 vs. Miami (FL)
- Conference: Southeastern Conference

Ranking
- Coaches: No. 3
- AP: No. 3
- Record: 13–2 (7–1 SEC)
- Head coach: Lane Kiffin (6th season; regular season (Note: Left after the regular season to be head coach at LSU.)); Pete Golding (postseason (Note: Became head coach after Kiffin left.))
- Offensive coordinator: Charlie Weis Jr. (4th season)
- Co-offensive coordinator: Joe Cox (2nd season)
- Offensive scheme: Veer and shoot
- Defensive coordinator: Pete Golding (3rd season)
- Co-defensive coordinator: Bryan Brown (2nd season)
- Base defense: Multiple 4–2–5
- Home stadium: Vaught–Hemingway Stadium

Uniform
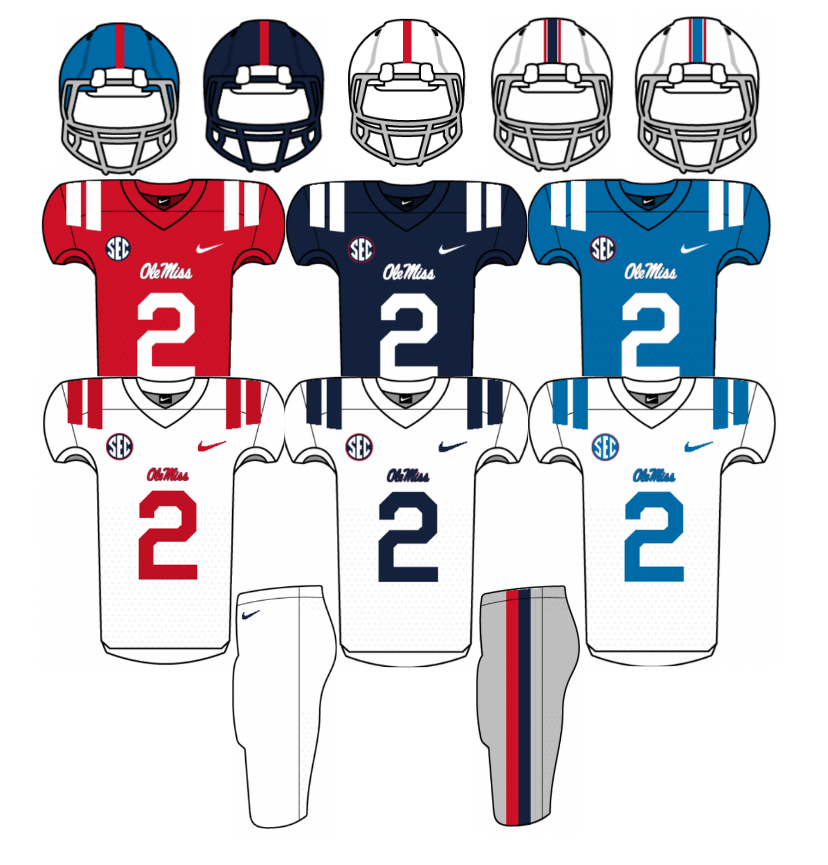

2025 Southeastern Conference football standings
	Conf.			Overall
Team	W		L	W		L
No. 9 Alabama y^	7	–	1	11	–	4
No. 6 Georgia y$^	7	–	1	12	–	2
No. 3 Ole Miss ^	7	–	1	13	–	2
No. 8 Texas A&M ^	7	–	1	11	–	2
No. 13 Oklahoma ^	6	–	2	10	–	3
No. 12 Texas	6	–	2	10	–	3
No. 15 Vanderbilt	6	–	2	10	–	3
Missouri	4	–	4	8	–	5
Tennessee	4	–	4	8	–	5
LSU	3	–	5	7	–	6
Kentucky	2	–	6	5	–	7
Florida	2	–	6	4	–	8
Auburn	1	–	7	5	–	7
Mississippi State	1	–	7	5	–	8
South Carolina	1	–	7	4	–	8
Arkansas	0	–	8	2	–	10
Championship: Georgia 28, Alabama 7
^ – College Football Playoff participant; $ – Conference champion; y – Championship game participant; Rankings from AP Poll

The 2025 Ole Miss Rebels football team represented the University of Mississippi (Ole Miss) in the Southeastern Conference (SEC) during the 2025 NCAA Division I FBS football season. The Rebels were led by head coach Lane Kiffin in the regular season and coach Pete Golding in the postseason and played home games at Vaught–Hemingway Stadium located in Oxford, Mississippi.

On November 30, Coach Kiffin accepted a seven-year deal to become the next head coach at LSU. Kiffin, having accepted the deal, requested athletic director Keith Carter to be allowed to coach the team through the College Football Playoff, but his request was denied. As such, defensive coordinator Pete Golding was named the team’s permanent head coach, and began his tenure with the playoff. On November 28, after a 38–19 victory over arch-rival Mississippi State in the Egg Bowl, the Rebels accomplished their first 11-win regular season in their history.

The team’s aforementioned appearance in the College Football Playoff was their first in program history as well, and in the tournament, the Rebels defeated Tulane in the first round and Georgia in the quarterfinal Sugar Bowl matchup, thus setting a new program record for most wins in a season with 13, and advanced to the national semifinals where they were defeated by Miami. The team earned a No. 3 final ranking in both the AP poll and Coaches Poll, their first top 3 or top 5 finish in either poll in 63 years. The Rebels’ 2025 season is widely considered their best since the early 1960’s.

The Ole Miss Rebels drew an average home attendance of 66,772, the highest of all American football teams from Mississippi.

== Schedule ==
Date	Time	Opponent	Rank	Site	TV	Result	Attendance
August 30	6:45 p.m.	Georgia State*	No. 21	Vaught–Hemingway Stadium; Oxford, MS	SECN	W 63–7	66,378
September 6	2:30 p.m.	at Kentucky	No. 20	Kroger Field; Lexington, KY	ABC	W 30–23	58,346
September 13	6:00 p.m.	Arkansas	No. 17	Vaught–Hemingway Stadium; Oxford, MS (rivalry)	ESPN	W 41–35	65,068
September 20	2:30 p.m.	Tulane*	No. 13	Vaught–Hemingway Stadium; Oxford, MS (rivalry)	ESPN	W 45–10	65,644
September 27	2:30 p.m.	No. 4 LSU	No. 13	Vaught–Hemingway Stadium; Oxford, MS (Magnolia Bowl)	ABC	W 24–19	67,737
October 11	11:45 a.m.	Washington State*^{†}	No. 4	Vaught–Hemingway Stadium; Oxford, MS	SECN	W 24–21	66,392
October 18	2:30 p.m.	at No. 9 Georgia	No. 5	Sanford Stadium; Athens, GA (College GameDay)	ABC	L 35–43	93,033
October 25	11:00 a.m.	at No. 13 Oklahoma	No. 8	Gaylord Family Oklahoma Memorial Stadium; Norman, OK (SEC Nation)	ABC	W 34–26	83,468
November 1	6:00 p.m.	South Carolina	No. 7	Vaught–Hemingway Stadium; Oxford, MS	ESPN	W 30–14	67,491
November 8	12:00 p.m.	The Citadel*	No. 6	Vaught–Hemingway Stadium; Oxford, MS	ESPN+/SECN+	W 49–0	67,326
November 15	6:00 p.m.	Florida	No. 7	Vaught–Hemingway Stadium; Oxford, MS	ESPN	W 34–24	68,138
November 28	11:00 a.m.	at Mississippi State	No. 7	Davis Wade Stadium; Starkville, MS (Egg Bowl)	ABC	W 38–19	60,417
December 20	2:30 p.m.	(11) No. 20 Tulane*	(6) No. 6	Vaught–Hemingway Stadium; Oxford, MS (CFP First Round, rivalry)	TNT/HBO Max	W 41–10	68,251‡
January 1, 2026	7:00 p.m.	vs. (3) No. 3 Georgia*	(6) No. 6	Caesars Superdome; New Orleans, LA (Sugar Bowl–CFP Quarterfinal, SEC Nation)	ESPN	W 39–34	68,371
January 8, 2026	6:30 p.m.	vs. (10) No. 10 Miami (FL)*	(6) No. 6	State Farm Stadium; Glendale, AZ (Fiesta Bowl–CFP Semifinal, College GameDay)	ESPN	L 27–31	67,928
*Non-conference game; ^{†}Homecoming; Rankings from AP Poll (and CFP Rankings, after November 4) - Released prior to game; All times are in Central time

‡New Vaught-Hemingway Stadium attendance record

== Rankings ==
Ranking movements Legend: ██ Increase in ranking ██ Decrease in ranking
	Week																
Poll	Pre	1	2	3	4	5	6	7	8	9	10	11	12	13	14	15	Final
AP	21	20	17	13	13	4	4	5	8	7	7	6	5	6	6	6	3
Coaches	15	14	13	11	11	4	4	5	8	8	7	7	6	6	5	6	3
CFP	Not released										6	7	6	7	6	6	Not released

== Offseason ==
=== NFL draft ===
Player	Position	Team	Round	Pick
Walter Nolen	DT	Arizona Cardinals	1	16
Jaxson Dart	QB	New York Giants	1	25
Tre Harris	WR	Los Angeles Chargers	2	55
Trey Amos	CB	Washington Commanders	2	61
Princely Umanmielen	DE	Carolina Panthers	3	77
Jordan Watkins	WR	San Francisco 49ers	4	138
Chris Paul Jr.	LB	Los Angeles Rams	5	172
JJ Pegues	DT	Las Vegas Raiders	6	180
Caden Prieskorn	TE	Detroit Lions	Undrafted	
Ulysses Bentley IV	RB	Indianapolis Colts	Undrafted	
John Saunders Jr.	S	Miami Dolphins	Undrafted	
Antwane Wells Jr.	WR	New York Giants	Undrafted	
Caden Davis	K	New York Jets	Undrafted	
Jared Ivey	DE	Seattle Seahawks	Undrafted	

== Game summaries ==
=== vs Georgia State ===
Georgia State Panthers (0–0) at No. 21 Ole Miss Rebels (0–0) – Game summary

Quarter	1	2	3	4	Total
Panthers	0	7	0	0	7
No. 21 Rebels	7	18	17	21	63

at Vaught–Hemingway Stadium • Oxford, MS

- Date: August 30
- Game time: 6:45 p.m.
- Game weather: Sunny • Temperature: 84 °F (29 °C) • Wind: NE at 2 miles per hour (3.2 km/h)
- Game attendance: 66,378
- Referee: Ken Williamson
- TV announcers (SECN): Tom Hart (play-by-play), Jordan Rodgers (color), and Cole Cubelic (sideline)

Game information

First quarter

- MISS – Dae'Quan Wright 38-yard pass from Austin Simmons (Lucas Carneiro kick), 10:32. Rebels 7–0. Drive: 3 plays, 65 yards, 0:48.

Second quarter

- MISS – Lucas Carneiro 42-yard field goal, 11:28. Rebels 10–0. Drive: 8 plays, 60 yards, 2:36.
- MISS – Kewan Lacy 1-yard run (Lucas Carneiro kick), 7:31. Rebels 17–0. Drive: 9 plays, 56 yards, 2:53.
- GAST – Javon Robinson 43-yard pass from Christian Veilleux (Liam Rickman kick), 5:19. Rebels 17–7. Drive: 4 plays, 75 yards, 2:12.
- MISS – Kewan Lacy 2-yard run (Trinidad Chambliss run), 0:21. Rebels 25–7. Drive: 16 plays, 75 yards, 4:58.

Third quarter

- MISS – Kewan Lacy 42-yard run (Lucas Carneiro kick), 13:04. Rebels 32–7. Drive: 6 plays, 75 yards, 1:56.
- MISS – Caleb Odom 9-yard pass from Austin Simmons (Lucas Carneiro kick), 10:32. Rebels 39–7. Drive: 3 plays, 20 yards, 1:16.
- MISS – Lucas Carneiro 33-yard field goal, 0:20. Rebels 42–7. Drive: 10 plays, 37 yards, 3:53.

Fourth quarter

- MISS – Harrison Wallace III 26-yard pass from Austin Simmons (Mike Baker kick), 13:31. Rebels 49–7. Drive: 2 plays, 61 yards, 0:32.
- MISS – Izaiah Hartrup 13-yard pass from Trinidad Chambliss (Mike Baker kick), 6:38. Rebels 56–7. Drive: 6 plays, 62 yards, 2:36.
- MISS – Logan Diggs 5-yard run (Mike Baker kick), 0:33. Rebels 63–7. Drive: 6 plays, 82 yards, 2:27.

Statistics	GAST	MISS
First downs	10	33
Plays–yards	60–260	68–695
Rushes–yards	35–191	44–295
Passing yards	69	400
Passing: comp–att–int	12–25–1	24–37–2
Turnovers	1	2
Time of possession	31:24	28:36

Team	Category	Player	Statistics
Georgia State	Passing	Christian Veilleux	4/11, 52 yards, TD, INT
Georgia State	Rushing	Rashad Amos	9 carries, 69 yards
Georgia State	Receiving	Javon Robinson	3 receptions, 52 yards, TD
Ole Miss	Passing	Austin Simmons	20/31, 341 yards, 3 TD, 2 INT
Ole Miss	Rushing	Kewan Lacy	16 carries, 108 yards, 3 TD
Ole Miss	Receiving	Harrison Wallace III	5 receptions, 130 yards, TD

=== at Kentucky ===
No. 20 Ole Miss Rebels (1–0) at Kentucky Wildcats (1–0) – Game summary

Quarter	1	2	3	4	Total
No. 20 Rebels	0	17	10	3	30
Wildcats	7	6	7	3	23

at Kroger Field • Lexington, KY

- Date: September 6
- Game time: 2:30 p.m.
- Game weather: Cloudy • Temperature: 62 °F (17 °C) • Wind: W at 7 miles per hour (11 km/h)
- Game attendance: 58,346
- Referee: David Smith
- TV announcers (ABC): Sean McDonough (play-by-play), Greg McElroy (color), and Molly McGrath (sideline)

Game information

First quarter

- UK – Seth McGowan 9-yard run (Jacob Kauwe kick), 1:55. Wildcats 7–0. Drive: 8 plays, 31 yards, 4:19.

Second quarter

- UK – Jacob Kauwe 33-yard field goal, 14:17. Wildcats 10–0. Drive: 5 plays, 17 yards, 1:33.
- MISS – Kewan Lacy 1-yard run (Lucas Carneiro kick), 12:25. Wildcats 10–7. Drive: 6 plays, 75 yards, 1:52.
- MISS – Damien Taylor 1-yard run (Lucas Carneiro kick), 8:24. Rebels 14–10. Drive: 8 plays, 70 yards, 2:49.
- UK – Jacob Kauwe 31-yard field goal, 4:31. Rebels 14–13. Drive: 10 plays, 62 yards, 3:53.
- MISS – Lucas Carneiro 43-yard field goal, 1:05. Rebels 17–13. Drive: 8 plays, 50 yards, 3:26.

Third quarter

- MISS – Lucas Carneiro 28-yard field goal, 8:48. Rebels 20–13. Drive: 9 plays, 61 yards, 3:39.
- UK – Seth McGowan 8-yard run (Jacob Kauwe kick), 5:38. Tied 20–20. Drive: 6 plays, 75 yards, 3:10.
- MISS – Austin Simmons 7-yard run (Lucas Carniero kick), 2:20. Rebels 27–20. Drive: 8 plays, 75 yards, 3:18.

Fourth quarter

- MISS – Lucas Carniero 36-yard field goal, 1:10. Rebels 30–20. Drive: 9 plays, 50 yards, 3:01.
- UK – Jacob Kauwe 39-yard field goal, 0:08. Rebels 30–23. Drive: 5 plays, 54 yards, 1:02.

Statistics	MISS	UK
First downs	20	18
Plays–yards	72–455	70–359
Rushes–yards	48–220	37–172
Passing yards	235	187
Passing: comp–att–int	13–24–2	16–33–0
Turnovers	2	0
Time of possession	27:47	32:13

Team	Category	Player	Statistics
Ole Miss	Passing	Austin Simmons	13/24, 235 yards, 2 INT
Ole Miss	Rushing	Kewan Lacy	28 carries, 138 yards, TD
Ole Miss	Receiving	Harrison Wallace III	4 receptions, 117 yards
Kentucky	Passing	Zach Calzada	15/30, 149 yards
Kentucky	Rushing	Seth McGowan	15 carries, 93 yards, 2 TD
Kentucky	Receiving	Ja'Mori Maclin	2 receptions, 59 yards

=== vs Arkansas (rivalry) ===
Arkansas Razorbacks (2–0) at No. 17 Ole Miss Rebels (2–0) – Game summary

Quarter	1	2	3	4	Total
Razorbacks	7	21	0	7	35
No. 17 Rebels	7	24	7	3	41

at Vaught–Hemingway Stadium • Oxford, Mississippi

- Date: September 13
- Game time: 6:00 p.m.
- Game weather: Sunny • Temperature: 89 °F (32 °C) • Wind: E at 5 miles per hour (8.0 km/h)
- Game attendance: 65,068
- Referee: Jason Autrey
- TV announcers (ESPN): Dave Pasch (play-by-play), Dusty Dvoracek (color), and Taylor McGregor (sideline)

Game information

First quarter

- (7:14) OLE – Kewan Lacy 2-yard run, Lucas Carneiro kick (Drive: 13 plays, 67 yards, 5:37; Ole Miss 7–0)
- (0:10) ARK – O'Mega Blake 30-yard pass from Taylen Green, Scott Starzyk kick (Drive: 12 plays, 75 yards, 7:04; Tied 7–7)

Second quarter

- (14:16) OLE – Trinidad Chambliss 2-yard run, Lucas Carneiro kick (Drive: 4 plays, 75 yards, 0:54; Ole Miss 14–7)
- (13:22) ARK – Mike Washington 47-yard run, Scott Starzyk kick (Drive: 4 plays, 75 yards, 0:54; Tied 14–14)
- (11:31) OLE – Trinidad Chambliss 1-yard run, Lucas Carneiro kick (Drive: 4 plays, 75 yards, 1:51; Ole Miss 21–14)
- (7:01) ARK – Braylen Russell 3-yard run, Scott Starzyk kick (Drive: 10 plays, 75 yards, 4:30; Tied 21–21)
- (3:17) OLE – Harrison Wallace III 4-yard pass from Austin Simmons, Lucas Carneiro kick (Drive: 10 plays, 75 yards, 3:44; Ole Miss 28–21)
- (1:18) ARK – Taylen Green 5-yard run, Scott Starzyk kick (Drive: 7 plays, 75 yards, 1:59; Tied 28–28)
- (0:00) OLE – Lucas Carneiro 36-yard field goal (Drive: 9 plays, 57 yards, 1:18; Ole Miss 31–28)

Third quarter

- (4:56) OLE – De'Zhaun Stribling 6-yard pass from Trinidad Chambliss, Lucas Carneiro kick (Drive: 12 plays, 93 yards, 4:58; Ole Miss 38–28)

Fourth quarter

- (10:58) OLE – Lucas Carneiro 23-yard field goal (Drive: 9 plays, 64 yards, 4:24; Ole Miss 41–28)
- (4:56) ARK – Mike Washington 3-yard run, Scott Starzyk kick (Drive: 12 plays, 75 yards, 6:02; Ole Miss 41–35)

Statistics	ARK	MISS
First downs	29	25
Plays–yards	72–526	70–475
Rushes–yards	37–221	40–118
Passing yards	305	357
Passing: comp–att–int	22–35–0	22–30–0
Turnovers	1	0
Time of possession	33:11	26:49

Team	Category	Player	Statistics
Arkansas	Passing	Taylen Green	22/35, 305 yards, TD
Arkansas	Rushing	Taylen Green	14 carries, 115 yards, TD
Arkansas	Receiving	O'Mega Blake	6 receptions, 81 yards, TD
Ole Miss	Passing	Trinidad Chambliss	21/29, 353 yards, TD
Ole Miss	Rushing	Trinidad Chambliss	15 carries, 62 yards, 2 TD
Ole Miss	Receiving	Harrison Wallace III	6 receptions, 92 yards, TD

=== vs Tulane (rivalry) ===
Tulane Green Wave (3–0) at No. 13 Ole Miss Rebels (3–0) – Game summary

Quarter	1	2	3	4	Total
Green Wave	3	0	7	0	10
No. 13 Rebels	10	13	0	22	45

at Vaught–Hemingway Stadium • Oxford, Mississippi

- Date: September 20
- Game time: 2:30 p.m.
- Game weather: Sunny • Temperature: 89 °F (32 °C) • Wind: W at 7 miles per hour (11 km/h)
- Game attendance: 65,644
- Referee: Steve Marlowe
- TV announcers (ESPN): Mark Jones (play-by-play), Roddy Jones (color), and Quint Kessenich (sideline)

Game information

First quarter

- (12:23) MISS – Dae'Quan Wright 5-yard pass from Trinidad Chambliss, Lucas Carneiro kick (Drive: 8 plays, 75 yards, 2:37; Ole Miss 7–0)
- (3:13) MISS – Lucas Carneiro 22-yard field goal (Drive: 15 plays, 70 yards, 6:40; Ole Miss 10–0)

Second quarter

- (12:48) MISS – Lucas Carneiro 54-yard field goal (Drive: 7 plays, 34 yards, 2:24; Ole Miss 13–0)
- (6:40) TULN – Patrick Durkin 34-yard field goal (Drive: 11 plays, 59 yards, 6:08; Ole Miss 13–3)
- (4:09) MISS – Kewan Lacy 1-yard run, Lucas Carneiro kick (Drive: 6 plays, 72 yards, 2:31; Ole Miss 20–3)
- (0:24) MISS – Lucas Carneiro 33-yard field goal (Drive: 8 plays, 62 yards, 1:26; Ole Miss 23–3)

Third quarter

- No scoring plays

Fourth quarter

- (14:55) MISS – Kewan Lacy 1-yard run, Harrison Wallace III pass (Drive: 6 plays, 60 yards, 2:44; Ole Miss 31–3)
- (11:45) MISS – Logan Diggs 2-yard run, Lucas Carneiro kick (Drive: 2 plays, 55 yards, 0:36; Ole Miss 38–3)
- (8:17) MISS – Deuce Alexander 33-yard pass from Trinidad Chambliss, Lucas Carneiro kick (Drive: 8 plays, 72 yards, 2:31; Ole Miss 45–3)
- (3:42) TULN – Anthony Brown-Stephens 6-yard pass from Brendan Sullivan, Patrick Durkin kick (Drive: 11 plays, 65 yards, 4:35; Ole Miss 45–10)

Statistics	TUL	MISS
First downs	18	23
Plays–yards	68–282	69–548
Rushes–yards	39–178	42–241
Passing yards	104	307
Passing: comp–att–int	10–29–1	17–27–0
Turnovers	1	1
Time of possession	32:29	27:31

Team	Category	Player	Statistics
Tulane	Passing	Jake Retzlaff	5/17, 56 yards
Tulane	Rushing	Jake Retzlaff	8 carries, 51 yards
Tulane	Receiving	Shazz Preston	3 receptions, 35 yards
Ole Miss	Passing	Trinidad Chambliss	17/27, 307 yards, 2 TD
Ole Miss	Rushing	Trinidad Chambliss	14 carries, 112 yards
Ole Miss	Receiving	Deuce Alexander	4 receptions, 94 yards, TD

=== vs No. 4 LSU (Magnolia Bowl) ===
No. 4 LSU Tigers (4–0) at No. 13 Ole Miss Rebels (4–0) – Game summary

Quarter	1	2	3	4	Total
No. 4 Tigers	7	0	6	6	19
No. 13 Rebels	3	14	0	7	24

at Vaught–Hemingway Stadium • Oxford, Mississippi

- Date: September 27
- Game time: 3:30 p.m. ET
- Game weather: Sunny • Temperature: 82 °F (28 °C) • Wind: NNW at 8 miles per hour (13 km/h)
- Game attendance: 67,737
- Referee: Ken Williamson
- TV announcers (ABC): Sean McDonough (play-by-play), Greg McElroy (color), and Molly McGrath (sideline)

Game information

First quarter

- (9:10) LSU – Nic Anderson 7-yard pass from Garrett Nussmeier, Damian Ramos kick (Drive: 5 plays, 67 yards, 2:36; LSU 7–0)
- (1:40) MISS – Lucas Carneiro 25-yard field goal (Drive: 18 plays, 83 yards, 7:25; LSU 7–3)

Second quarter

- (5:09) MISS – Kewan Lacy 15-yard run, Lucas Carneiro kick (Drive: 5 plays, 70 yards, 1:40; Ole Miss 10–7)
- (0:13) MISS – Cayden Lee 2-yard pass from Trinidad Chambliss, Lucas Carneiro kick (Drive: 9 plays, 69 yards, 2:03; Ole Miss 17–7)

Third quarter

- (6:02) LSU – Damian Ramos 39-yard field goal (Drive: 8 plays, 33 yards, 4:35; Ole Miss 17–10)
- (0:58) LSU – Damian Ramos 48-yard field goal (Drive: 6 plays, 16 yards, 2:14; Ole Miss 17–13)

Fourth quarter

- (11:08) MISS – Logan Diggs 6-yard run, Lucas Carneiro kick (Drive: 11 plays, 75 yards, 4:50; Ole Miss 24–13)
- (5:04) LSU – Harlem Berry 6-yard run (Drive: 15 plays, 80 yards, 5:58; Ole Miss 24–19)

Statistics	LSU	MISS
First downs	16	28
Plays–yards	56–256	84–484
Rushes–yards	21–59	42–170
Passing yards	197	314
Passing: comp–att–int	21–34–1	23–39–1
Turnovers	1	2
Time of possession	27:38	32:22

Team	Category	Player	Statistics
LSU	Passing	Garrett Nussmeier	21/34, 197 yards, TD, INT
LSU	Rushing	Harlem Berry	7 carries, 22 yards, TD
LSU	Receiving	Zavion Thomas	3 receptions, 63 yards
Ole Miss	Passing	Trinidad Chambliss	23/39, 314 yards, TD, INT
Ole Miss	Rushing	Kewan Lacy	23 carries, 87 yards, TD
Ole Miss	Receiving	Cayden Lee	4 receptions, 70 yards, TD

=== vs Washington State ===
Washington State Cougars (3–2) at No. 4 Ole Miss Rebels (5–0) – Game summary

Quarter	1	2	3	4	Total
Cougars	7	0	7	7	21
No. 4 Rebels	0	10	7	7	24

at Vaught–Hemingway Stadium • Oxford, Mississippi

- Date: October 11
- Game time: 11:45 a.m.
- Game weather: Sunny • Temperature: 76 °F (24 °C) • Wind: NE at 1 mile per hour (1.6 km/h)
- Game attendance: 66,392
- Referee: Jeff Heaser
- TV announcers (SECN): Taylor Zarzour (play-by-play), Matt Stinchcomb (color), and Alyssa Lang (sideline)

Game information

First quarter

- WSU - Landon Wright 26-yard pass from Zevi Eckhaus (Jack Stevens kick), 1:58. Cougars 7-0, Drive: 9 plays, 71 yards, 4:33.

Second quarter

- MISS - Lucas Carneiro 40-yard field goal, 6:19. Cougars 7-3, Drive: 9 plays, 41 yards, 3:51.
- MISS - Dae'Quan Wright 2-yard pass from Trinidad Chambliss (Lucas Carneiro kick), 0:31. Rebels 10-7, Drive: 10 plays, 87 yards, 2:30.

Third quarter

- WSU – Kirby Vorhees 46-yard run (Jack Stevens kick), 10:19. Cougars 14-10, Drive: 7 plays, 75 yards, 4:41.
- MISS - Trinidad Chambliss 17 Yd Run (Lucas Carneiro Kick), 0:32. Rebels 17-14, Drive: 11 plays, 82 yards, 4:28.

Fourth quarter

- MISS - Cayden Lee 35-yard pass from Trinidad Chambliss (Lucas Carneiro kick), 6:51. Rebels 24-14, Drive: 4 plays, 60 yards, 1:31.
- WSU - Tony Freeman 19-yard pass from Zevi Eckhaus (Jack Stevens kick), 2:43. Rebels 24-21, Drive: 9 plays, 75 yards, 4:08.

Statistics	WSU	MISS
First downs	21	25
Plays–yards	59–345	70–439
Rushes–yards	28–127	41–186
Passing yards	218	253
Passing: comp–att–int	24–31–0	20–29–0
Turnovers	0	1
Time of possession	32:42	27:18

Team	Category	Player	Statistics
Washington State	Passing	Zevi Eckhaus	24/31, 218 yards, 2 TD
Washington State	Rushing	Kirby Vorhees	10 carries, 88 yards, TD
Washington State	Receiving	Tony Freeman	9 receptions, 92 yards, TD
Ole Miss	Passing	Trinidad Chambliss	20/29, 253 yards, 2 TD
Ole Miss	Rushing	Kewan Lacy	24 carries, 142 yards
Ole Miss	Receiving	Dae'Quan Wright	4 receptions, 80 yards, TD

=== at No. 9 Georgia ===
No. 5 Ole Miss Rebels (6–0) at No. 9 Georgia Bulldogs (5–1) – Game summary

Quarter	1	2	3	4	Total
No. 5 Rebels	7	14	14	0	35
No. 9 Bulldogs	3	17	6	17	43

at Sanford Stadium • Athens, GA

- Date: October 18
- Game time: 3:30 p.m.
- Game weather: Sunny • Temperature: 78 °F (26 °C) • Wind: SW 6 mph
- Game attendance: 93,033
- Referee: Daniel Gautreaux
- TV announcers (ABC): Chris Fowler (play-by-play), Kirk Herbstreit (color), and Holly Rowe (sideline)

Game information

First quarter

- (11:05) UGA – Peyton Woodring 51-yard field goal (Drive: 7 plays, 42 yards, 3:55; Georgia 3–0)
- (5:47) MISS – Trinidad Chambliss 7-yard run, Lucas Carneiro kick (Drive: 14 plays, 65 yards, 5:18; Ole Miss 7–3)

Second quarter

- (14:56) UGA – Lawson Luckie 11-yard pass from Gunner Stockton, Peyton Woodring kick (Drive: 13 plays, 75 yards, 5:51; Georgia 10–7)
- (10:53) MISS – Kewan Lacy 1-yard run, Lucas Carneiro kick (Drive: 10 plays, 65 yards, 4:03; Ole Miss 14–10)
- (7:13) UGA – Gunner Stockton 22-yard run, Peyton Woodring kick (Drive: 8 plays, 75 yards, 3:40; Georgia 17–14)
- (2:10) MISS – Kewan Lacy 1-yard run, Lucas Carneiro kick (Drive: 11 plays, 75 yards, 5:03; Ole Miss 21–17)
- (0:00) UGA – Peyton Woodring 35-yard field goal (Drive: 12 plays, 58 yards, 2:10; Ole Miss 21–20)

Third quarter

- (14:46) MISS – De'Zhaun Stribling 75-yard pass from Trinidad Chambliss, Lucas Carneiro kick (Drive: 2 plays, 75 yards, 0:14; Ole Miss 28–20)
- (10:02) UGA – Lawson Luckie 3-yard pass from Gunner Stockton, Two-point conversion try failed (Drive: 9 plays, 75 yards, 4:44; Ole Miss 28–26)
- (4:12) MISS – Trinidad Chambliss 2-yard run, Lucas Carneiro kick (Drive: 12 plays, 75 yards, 5:50; Ole Miss 35–26)

Fourth quarter

- (12:56) UGA – Nate Frazier 3-yard pass from Gunner Stockton, Peyton Woodring kick (Drive: 12 plays, 75 yards, 6:16; Ole Miss 35–33)
- (7:29) UGA – Lawson Luckie 7-yard pass from Gunner Stockton, Peyton Woodring kick (Drive: 9 plays, 67 yards, 5:08; Georgia 40–35)
- (2:06) UGA – Peyton Woodring 42-yard field goal (Drive: 10 plays, 66 yards, 4:26; Georgia 43–35)

Statistics	MISS	UGA
First downs	21	34
Plays–yards	60–351	80–510
Rushes–yards	24–88	49–221
Passing yards	263	289
Passing: comp–att–int	19–36–0	26–31–0
Turnovers	0	0
Time of possession	22:21	37:39

Team	Category	Player	Statistics
Ole Miss	Passing	Trinidad Chambliss	19/36, 263 yards, TD
Ole Miss	Rushing	Trinidad Chambliss	9 carries, 42 yards, 2 TD
Ole Miss	Receiving	De'Zhaun Stribling	3 receptions, 96 yards, TD
Georgia	Passing	Gunner Stockton	26/31, 289 yards, 4 TD
Georgia	Rushing	Nate Frazier	17 carries, 72 yards
Georgia	Receiving	Zachariah Branch	8 receptions, 71 yards

=== at No. 13 Oklahoma ===
No. 8 Ole Miss Rebels (6–1) at No. 13 Oklahoma Sooners (6–1) – Game summary

Quarter	1	2	3	4	Total
No. 8 Rebels	10	12	3	9	34
No. 13 Sooners	3	7	16	0	26

at Gaylord Family Oklahoma Memorial Stadium • Norman, OK

- Date: October 25
- Game time: 11:00 a.m.
- Game weather: Sunny
- Game attendance: 83,468
- Referee: Matt Loeffler
- TV announcers (ABC): Sean McDonough (play-by-play), Greg McElroy (color), and Molly McGrath (sideline)

Game information

First quarter

- (12:30) MISS – Lucas Carneiro 45-yard field goal (Drive: 8 plays, 47 yards, 2:30; MISS 3–0)
- (8:52) OU – Tate Sandell 42-yard field goal (Drive: 8 plays, 51 yards, 3:38; Tied 3–3)
- (6:07) MISS – Kewan Lacy 28-yard run, Lucas Carneiro kick (Drive: 8 plays, 75 yards, 2:45; MISS 10–3)

Second quarter

- (14:04) OU – Isaiah Sategna III 76-yard pass from John Mateer, Tate Sandell kick (Drive: 3 plays, 83 yards, 1:39; Tied 10–10)
- (10:51) MISS – Safety (Drive: 1 plays, -5 yards, 0:34; MISS 12–10)
- (7:33) MISS – Lucas Carneiro 22-yard field goal (Drive: 12 plays, 47 yards, 3:11; MISS 15–10)
- (0:46) MISS – Kewan Lacy 2 yard-run, Lucas Carneiro kick (Drive: 9 plays, 49 yards, 3:46; MISS 22–10)

Third quarter

- (11:16) OU – Tate Sandell 42-yard field goal (Drive: 4 plays, -9 yards, 1:30; MISS 22–13)
- (5:57) MISS – Lucas Carneiro 39-yard field goal (Drive: 14 plays, 63 yards, 5:19; MISS 25–13)
- (5:45) OU – Xavier Robinson 65-yard run, Tate Sandell kick (Drive: 1 play, 65 yards, 0:12; MISS 25–20)
- (1:04) OU – Xavier Robinson 9-yard run, 2-point pass failed (Drive: 7 plays, 60 yards, 3:40; OU 26–25)

Fourth quarter

- (11:33) MISS – Trace Bruckler 8-yard pass from Trinidad Chambliss, 2-point pass failed (Drive: 11 plays, 75 yards, 4:31; MISS 31–26)
- (4:09) MISS – Lucas Carneiro 37-yard field goal (Drive: 5 plays, 33 yards, 2:55; MISS 34–26)

Statistics	MISS	OU
First downs	21	14
Plays–yards	87–431	60–359
Rushes–yards	41–116	28–136
Passing yards	315	223
Passing: comp–att–int	24–46–0	17–32–0
Turnovers	0	1
Time of possession	35:36	24:24

Team	Category	Player	Statistics
Ole Miss	Passing	Trinidad Chambliss	24/44, 315 yards, TD
Ole Miss	Rushing	Kewan Lacy	27 carries, 78 yards, 2 TD
Ole Miss	Receiving	Harrison Wallace III	5 receptions, 64 yards
Oklahoma	Passing	John Mateer	17/31, 223 yards, TD
Oklahoma	Rushing	Xavier Robinson	9 carries, 109 yards, 2 TD
Oklahoma	Receiving	Isaiah Sategna III	6 receptions, 131 yards, TD

=== vs South Carolina ===
South Carolina Gamecocks (3–5) at No. 7 Ole Miss Rebels (7–1) – Game summary

Quarter	1	2	3	4	Total
Gamecocks	7	0	7	0	14
No. 7 Rebels	10	7	3	10	30

at Vaught–Hemingway Stadium • Oxford, Mississippi

- Date: November 1
- Game time: 6:00 p.m.
- Game weather: Cloudy • Temperature: 58 °F (14 °C) • Wind: W at 3 miles per hour (4.8 km/h)
- Game attendance: 67,491
- Referee: Kyle Olson
- TV announcers (ESPN): Bob Wischusen (play-by-play), Louis Riddick (color), and Kris Budden (sideline)

Game information

First quarter

- SC – LaNorris Sellers 1-yard run (William Joyce kick), 9:43. Gamecocks 7–0. Drive: 4 plays, 16 yards, 1:55.
- MISS – Lucas Carneiro 21-yard field goal, 3:58. Gamecocks 7–3. Drive: 11 plays, 51 yards, 5:06.
- MISS – Dae'Quan Wright 8-yard pass from Trinidad Chambliss (Lucas Carneiro kick), 1:28. Rebels 10–7. Drive: 2 plays, 51 yards, 0:35.

Second quarter

- MISS – Trinidad Chambliss 15-yard run (Lucas Carneiro kick), 6:56. Rebels 17–7. Drive: 10 plays, 89 yards, 5:11.

Third quarter

- SC – Nyck Harbor 47-yard pass from LaNorris Sellers (William Joyce kick), 11:30. Rebels 17–14. Drive: 5 plays, 75 yards, 3:30.
- MISS – Lucas Carneiro 27-yard field goal, 5:46. Rebels 20–14. Drive: 4 plays, 3 yards, 2:10.

Fourth quarter

- MISS – Lucas Carneiro 34-yard field goal, 11:54. Rebels 23–14. Drive: 6 plays, 38 yards, 2:59.
- MISS – Kewan Lacy 54-yard run (Lucas Carneiro kick), 5:44. Rebels 30–14. Drive: 1 play, 54 yards, 0:12.

Statistics	SC	MISS
First downs	15	19
Plays–yards	62–230	66–417
Rushes–yards	32–50	45–258
Passing yards	180	159
Passing: comp–att–int	16–30–2	12–21–1
Turnovers	3	2
Time of possession	29:14	30:46

Team	Category	Player	Statistics
South Carolina	Passing	LaNorris Sellers	16/30, 180 yards, TD, 2 INT
South Carolina	Rushing	Rahsul Faison	12 carries, 52 yards
South Carolina	Receiving	Nyck Harbor	3 receptions, 69 yards, TD
Ole Miss	Passing	Trinidad Chambliss	12/21, 159 yards, TD, INT
Ole Miss	Rushing	Kewan Lacy	24 carries, 167 yards, TD
Ole Miss	Receiving	Deuce Alexander	2 receptions, 52 yards

=== vs The Citadel (FCS) ===
The Citadel Bulldogs (FCS) (4–5) at No. 6 Ole Miss Rebels (8–1) – Game summary

Quarter	1	2	3	4	Total
Bulldogs (FCS)	0	0	0	0	0
No. 6 Rebels	21	14	7	7	49

at Vaught–Hemingway Stadium • Oxford, Mississippi

- Date: November 8
- Game time: 12:00 p.m.
- Game weather: Sunny • Temperature: 70 °F (21 °C) • Wind: SW at 5 miles per hour (8.0 km/h)
- Game attendance: 67,326
- Referee: James Carter
- TV announcers (SECN+/ESPN+): Dave Neal (play-by-play), Fozzy Whittaker (color), and Morgan Uber (sideline)

Game information

First quarter

- MISS – Kewan Lacy 2-yard run (Lucas Carneiro kick), 11:43. Rebels 7–0. Drive: 10 plays, 87 yards, 3:11.
- MISS – Kewan Lacy 15-yard run (Lucas Carneiro kick), 6:34. Rebels 14–0. Drive: 9 plays, 77 yards, 2:46.
- MISS – Winston Watkins 11-yard pass from Trinidad Chambliss (Lucas Carneiro kick), 0:23. Rebels 21–0. Drive: 3 plays, 72 yards, 0:44.

Second quarter

- MISS – Cayden Lee 22-yard pass from Trinidad Chambliss (Lucas Carneiro kick), 10:48. Rebels 28–0. Drive: 7 plays, 68 yards, 2:38.
- MISS – Kewan Lacy 3-yard run (Lucas Carneiro kick), 0:45. Rebels 35–0. Drive: 11 plays, 80 yards, 3:21.

Third quarter

- MISS – Caleb Odom 1-yard pass from Trinidad Chambliss (Lucas Carneiro kick), 11:31. Rebels 42–0. Drive: 5 plays, 53 yards, 1:45.

Fourth quarter

- MISS – Damian Taylor 1-yard run (Lucas Carneiro kick), 6:24. Rebels 49–0. Drive: 9 plays, 61 yards, 3:10.

Statistics	CIT	MISS
First downs	5	35
Plays–yards	50–106	81–603
Rushes–yards	42–83	35–151
Passing yards	23	452
Passing: comp–att–int	3–8–0	37–46–1
Turnovers	0	1
Time of possession	32:04	27:56

Team	Category	Player	Statistics
The Citadel	Passing	Cobey Thompkins	3/6, 23 yards
The Citadel	Rushing	Beau Herrington	7 carries, 53 yards
The Citadel	Receiving	Jihad Marks	1 reception, 16 yards
Ole Miss	Passing	Trinidad Chambliss	29/33, 300 yards, 3 TD
Ole Miss	Rushing	Kewan Lacy	11 carries, 49 yards, 3 TD
Ole Miss	Receiving	Harrison Wallace III	8 receptions, 87 yards

=== vs Florida ===
Florida Gators (3–6) at No. 7 Ole Miss Rebels (9–1) – Game summary

Quarter	1	2	3	4	Total
Gators	7	17	0	0	24
No. 7 Rebels	10	10	0	14	34

at Vaught–Hemingway Stadium • Oxford, Mississippi

- Date: November 15
- Game time: 6:00 p.m.
- Game weather: Clear • Temperature: 68 °F (20 °C) • Wind: SW at 8 miles per hour (13 km/h)
- Game attendance: 68,138
- Referee: Matt Loeffler
- TV announcers (ESPN): Bob Wischusen (play-by-play), Louis Riddick (color), and Kris Budden (sideline)

Game information

First quarter

- MISS – Kewan Lacy 3-yard run (Lucas Carneiro kick), 9:09. Rebels 7–0. Drive: 12 plays, 80 yards, 4:56.
- MISS – Lucas Carneiro 27-yard field goal, 3:58. Rebels 10–0. Drive: 7 plays, 62 yards, 3:09.
- FLA – DJ Lagway 5-yard run (Trey Smack kick), 1:13. Rebels 10–7. Drive: 7 plays, 75 yards, 2:45.

Second quarter

- FLA – Jadan Baugh 2-yard run (Trey Smack kick), 14:56. Gators 14–10. Drive: 2 plays, 5 yards, 1:07.
- MISS – De'Zhaun Stribling 43-yard pass from Trinidad Chambliss (Lucas Carneiro kick), 9:39. Rebels 17–14. Drive: 10 plays, 75 yards, 5:17.
- FLA – J. Michael Sturdivant 57-yard pass from DJ Lagway (Trey Smack kick), 6:54. Gators 21–17. Drive: 5 plays, 75 yards, 2:45.
- MISS – Lucas Carneiro 23-yard field goal, 1:52. Gators 21–20. Drive: 13 plays, 69 yards, 5:02.
- FLA – Trey Smack 38-yard field goal, 0:03. Gators 24–20. Drive: 12 plays, 55 yards, 1:49.

Third quarter

- No scoring plays.

Fourth quarter

- MISS – Kewan Lacy 1-yard run (Lucas Carneiro kick), 14:57. Rebels 27–24. Drive: 6 plays, 86 yards, 1:48.
- MISS – Kewan Lacy 4-yard run (Lucas Carneiro kick), 1:43. Rebels 34–24. Drive: 1 play, 4 yards, 0:05.

Statistics	FLA	MISS
First downs	14	27
Plays–yards	57–326	83–538
Rushes–yards	25–108	48–237
Passing yards	218	301
Passing: comp–att–int	16–31–1	26–35–1
Turnovers	1	1
Time of possession	22:03	37:57

Team	Category	Player	Statistics
Florida	Passing	DJ Lagway	16/31, 218 yards, TD, INT
Florida	Rushing	Jadan Baugh	15 carries, 61 yards, TD
Florida	Receiving	TJ Abrams	3 receptions, 76 yards
Ole Miss	Passing	Trinidad Chambliss	26/35, 301 yards, TD, INT
Ole Miss	Rushing	Kewan Lacy	31 carries, 224 yards, 3 TD
Ole Miss	Receiving	De'Zhaun Stribling	4 receptions, 76 yards, TD

=== at Mississippi State (Egg Bowl) ===
No. 7 Ole Miss Rebels (10–1) at Mississippi State Bulldogs (5–6) – Game summary

Quarter	1	2	3	4	Total
No. 7 Rebels	14	7	3	14	38
Bulldogs	7	3	3	6	19

at Davis Wade Stadium • Starkville, MS

- Date: November 28
- Game time: 11:00 a.m.
- Game weather: Sunny • Temperature: 47 °F (8 °C) • Wind: NE at 3 miles per hour (4.8 km/h)
- Game attendance: 60,417
- Referee: James Carter
- TV announcers (ABC): Dave Pasch (play-by-play), Dusty Dvoracek (analyst), Taylor McGregor and Marty Smith (sideline reporters)

Game information

First quarter

- MISS – Kewan Lacy 31-yard run (Lucas Carneiro kick), 13:05. Rebels 7–0. Drive: 5 plays, 75 yards, 1:55.
- MSST – Kamario Taylor 22-yard run (Kyle Ferrie kick), 8:50. Tied 7–7. Drive: 10 plays, 97 yards, 4:15.
- MISS – Harrison Wallace III 24-yard pass from Trinidad Chambliss (Lucas Carneiro kick), 5:22. Rebels 14–7. Drive: 8 plays, 75 yards, 3:28.

Second quarter

- MSST – Kyle Ferrie 40-yard field goal, 1:45. Rebels 14–10. Drive: 6 plays, 58 yards, 1:22.
- MISS – De'Zhaun Stribling 10-yard pass from Trinidad Chambliss (Lucas Carneiro kick), 0:12. Rebels 21–10. Drive: 9 plays, 75 yards, 1:33.
- MISS –

Third quarter

- MSST – Kyle Ferrie 36-yard field goal, 10:01. Rebels 21–13. Drive: 12 plays, 57 yards, 4:59.
- MISS – Lucas Carneiro 43-yard field goal, 6:43. Rebels 24–13. Drive: 8 plays, 49 yards, 3:18.

Fourth quarter

- MISS – De'Zhaun Stribling 23-yard pass from Trinidad Chambliss (Lucas Carneiro kick), 13:46. Rebels 31–13. Drive: 11 plays, 77 yards, 4:57.
- MSST – Kamario Taylor 35-yard run (pass failed), 10:40. Rebels 31–19. Drive: 9 plays, 75 yards, 3:06.
- MISS – Deuce Alexander 88-yard pass from Trinidad Chambliss (Lucas Carneiro kick), 9:50. Rebels 38–19. Drive: 2 plays, 90 yards, 0:43.

Statistics	MISS	MSST
First downs	29	22
Plays–yards	75–545	74–440
Rushes–yards	41–186	43–262
Passing yards	359	178
Passing: comp–att–int	23–34–0	15–31–1
Turnovers	0	1
Time of possession	31:23	28:37

Team	Category	Player	Statistics
Ole Miss	Passing	Trinidad Chambliss	23/34, 359 yards, 4 TD
Ole Miss	Rushing	Kewan Lacy	27 carries, 143 yards, TD
Ole Miss	Receiving	Deuce Alexander	2 receptions, 94 yards, TD
Mississippi State	Passing	Kamario Taylor	15/31, 178 yards, INT
Mississippi State	Rushing	Kamario Taylor	20 carries, 173 yards, 2 TD
Mississippi State	Receiving	Brenen Thompson	6 receptions, 80 yards

=== vs. No. 11 Tulane (CFP First Round) ===
CFP First Round Game
No. 11 Tulane Green Wave (11–2) at No. 6 Ole Miss Rebels (11-1) – Game summary

Quarter	1	2	3	4	Total
No. 11 Green Wave	0	3	0	7	10
No. 6 Rebels	14	3	10	14	41

at Vaught-Hemingway Stadium • Oxford, MS

- Date: December 20
- Game time: 2:30 pm CST
- Game weather: Sunny • Temperature: 65 °F (18 °C) • Wind: S at 9 miles per hour (14 km/h)
- Game attendance: 68,251
- Referee: Adam Savoie
- TV announcers (TNT): Joe Tessitore (play-by-play), Jesse Palmer (analyst), Katie George and Quint Kessenich (sideline reporters)

Game information

First quarter

- MISS – Kewan Lacy 20-yard run (Lucas Carneiro kick), 14:01. Rebels 7–0. Drive: 3 plays, 75 yards, 0:59.
- MISS – Trinidad Chambliss 4-yard run (Lucas Carneiro kick), 7:26. Rebels 14–0. Drive: 4 plays, 60 yards, 1:21.

Second quarter

- TULN – Patrick Durkin 39-yard field goal, 14:06. Rebels 14–3. Drive: 5 plays, 61 yards, 1:59.
- MISS – Lucas Carneiro 42-yard field goal, 3:38. Rebels 17–3. Drive: 11 plays, 62 yards, 4:40.

Third quarter

- MISS – De'Zhaun Stribling 13-yard pass from Trinidad Chambliss (Lucas Carneiro kick), 10:13. Rebels 24–3. Drive: 7 plays, 80 yards, 2:51.
- MISS – Lucas Carneiro 48-yard field goal, 4:57. Rebels 27–3. Drive: 6 plays, 16 yards, 1:47.

Fourth quarter

- MISS – Logan Diggs 3-yard run (Lucas Carneiro kick), 14:55. Rebels 34–3. Drive: 8 plays, 52 yards, 3:07.
- MISS – Trinidad Chambliss 8-yard run (Lucas Carneiro kick), 10:45. Rebels 41–3. Drive: 5 plays, 29 yards, 2:37.
- TULN – Justyn Reid 29-yard pass from Jake Retzlaff (Patrick Durkin kick), 4:00. Rebels 41–10. Drive: 4 plays, 80 yards, 2:03.

Statistics	TULN	MISS
First downs	20	30
Plays–yards	71–421	68–497
Rushes–yards	34–115	34–151
Passing yards	306	346
Passing: comp–att–int	20–37–1	27–34–0
Turnovers	3	1
Time of possession	31:01	28:30

Team	Category	Player	Statistics
Tulane	Passing	Jake Retzlaff	20/35, 306 yards, TD, INT
Tulane	Rushing	Jamauri McClure	15 carries, 84 yards
Tulane	Receiving	Shazz Preston	5 receptions, 125 yards
Ole Miss	Passing	Trinidad Chambliss	23/29, 282 yards, TD
Ole Miss	Rushing	Kewan Lacy	15 carries, 87 yards, TD
Ole Miss	Receiving	Deuce Alexander	7 receptions, 87 yards

=== vs. No. 3 Georgia–Sugar Bowl (CFP Quarterfinal) ===
CFP Quarterfinal at the Allstate Sugar Bowl
No. 6 Ole Miss Rebels (12–1) vs. No. 3 Georgia Bulldogs (12–1) – Game summary

Quarter	1	2	3	4	Total
No. 6 Rebels	6	6	7	20	39
No. 3 Bulldogs	0	21	3	10	34

at Caesars Superdome • New Orleans, LA

- Date: January 1
- Game time: 7:00 p.m.
- Game weather: Indoor • Temperature: 67 °F (19 °C)
- Game attendance: 68,371
- Referee: Jeff Servinski
- TV announcers (ESPN): Sean McDonough (play by play), Greg McElroy (analyst), Molly McGrath and Laura Rutledge (sideline reporters)

Game information

First quarter

- (5:47) MISS – Lucas Carneiro 54-yard field goal (Drive: 11 plays, 60 yards, 4:27; Ole Miss 3–0)
- (2:13) MISS – Lucas Carneiro 56-yard field goal (Drive: 7 plays, 42 yards, 2:10; Ole Miss 6–0)

Second quarter

- (13:37) UGA – Gunner Stockton 12-yard run, Peyton Woodring kick (Drive: 7 plays, 75 yards, 3:36; Georgia 7–6)
- (10:33) MISS – Luke Hasz 3-yard pass from Trinidad Chambliss, Two-point run conversion failed (Drive: 8 plays, 75 yards, 3:04; Ole Miss 12–7)
- (4:05) UGA – Gunner Stockton 1-yard run, Peyton Woodring kick (Drive: 12 plays, 75 yards, 6:28; Georgia 14–12)
- (2:34) UGA – Fumble returned 47 yards for touchdown by Daylen Everette, Peyton Woodring kick (Georgia 21–12)

Third quarter

- (4:51) MISS – Kewan Lacy 7-yard run, Lucas Carneiro kick (Drive: 7 plays, 63 yards, 3:42; Georgia 21–19)
- (0:30) UGA – Peyton Woodring 37-yard field goal (Drive: 10 plays, 56 yards, 4:21; Georgia 24–19)

Fourth quarter

- (11:29) MISS – Kewan Lacy 5-yard run, (Trinidad Chambliss pass to Harrison Wallace III (Drive: 8 plays, 75 yards, 4:01; Ole Miss 27–24)
- (9:02) MISS – Harrison Wallace III 13-yard pass from Trinidad Chambliss, T Lucas Carneiro kick (Drive: 2 plays, 23 yards, 0:29; Ole Miss 34–24)
- (7:03) UGA – Zachariah Branch 18-yard pass from Gunner Stockton, Peyton Woodring kick (Drive: 6 plays, 75 yards, 1:59; Ole Miss 34–31)
- (0:56) UGA – Peyton Woodring 24-yard field goal (Drive: 12 plays, 58 yards, 4:37; Tied 34–34)
- (0:06) MISS – Lucas Carneiro 47-yard field goal (Drive: 7 plays, 45 yards, 0:50; Ole Miss 37–34)
- (0:01) MISS – Team safety (Ole Miss 39–34)

Statistics	MISS	UGA
First downs	23	23
Plays–yards	73–473	70–343
Rushes–yards	27–111	37–124
Passing yards	362	219
Passing: comp–att–int	30–46–0	19–33–0
Turnovers	1	1
Time of possession	27:28	32:32

Team	Category	Player	Statistics
Ole Miss	Passing	Trinidad Chambliss	30/46, 362 yards, 2 TD
Ole Miss	Rushing	Kewan Lacy	22 carries, 98 yards, 2 TD
Ole Miss	Receiving	Harrison Wallace III	9 receptions, 156 yards, TD
Georgia	Passing	Gunner Stockton	18/31, 203 yards, TD
Georgia	Rushing	Nate Frazier	15 carries, 86 yards
Georgia	Receiving	Zachariah Branch	8 receptions, 67 yards, TD

=== vs. No. 10 Miami (Fiesta Bowl/CFP Semifinal) ===
CFP Semifinal at the VRBO Fiesta Bowl
No. 10 Miami Hurricanes (12–2) vs. No. 6 Ole Miss Rebels (13–1) – Game summary

Quarter	1	2	3	4	Total
No. 10 Hurricanes	3	14	0	14	31
No. 6 Rebels	0	13	3	11	27

at State Farm Stadium • Glendale, AZ

- Date: January 8
- Game time: 7:30 p.m.
- Game weather: Indoor
- Game attendance: 67,928
- Referee: Rod Snodgrass (Big Ten)
- TV announcers (ESPN): Chris Fowler (play by play), Kirk Herbstreit (analyst), Holly Rowe and Laura Rutledge (sideline reporters)

Game information

First quarter

- MIA – Carter Davis 38-yard field goal, 6:22. Hurricanes 3–0. Drive: 13 plays, 44 yards, 7:21.

Second quarter

- MISS – Kewan Lacy 73-yard run (Lucas Carneiro kick), 14:50. Rebels 7–3. Drive: 2 plays, 80 yards, 0:34.
- MIA – CharMar Brown 4-yard run (Carter Davis kick), 7:09. Hurricanes 10–7. Drive: 15 plays, 75 yards, 7:41.
- MISS – Lucas Carneiro 42-yard field goal, 4:38. Tied 10–10. Drive: 7 plays, 51 yards, 2:31.
- MIA – Keelan Marion 52-yard pass from Carson Beck (Carter Davis kick), 2:18. Hurricanes 17–10. Drive: 5 plays, 75 yards, 2:00.
- MISS – Lucas Carneiro 58-yard field goal, 0:11. Hurricanes 17–13. Drive: 8 plays, 29 yards, 0:44.

Third quarter

- MISS – Lucas Carneiro 54-yard field goal, 0:22. Hurricanes 17–16. Drive: 9 plays, 49 yards, 2:57.

Fourth quarter

- MISS – Lucas Carneiro 21-yard field goal, 7:00. Rebels 19–17. Drive: 14 plays, 86 yards, 5:19.
- MIA – Malachi Toney 36-yard pass from Carson Beck (Carter Davis kick), 5:04. Hurricanes 24–19. Drive: 4 plays, 75 yards, 1:56.
- MISS – Dae'Quan Wright 24-yard pass from Trinidad Chambliss (Caleb Odom–Tridad Chambliss pass), 3:13. Rebels 27–24. Drive: 6 plays, 75 yards, 1:51.
- MIA – Carson Beck 3-yard run (Carter Davis kick), 0:18. Hurricanes 31–27. Drive: 15 plays, 75 yards, 2:55.

Statistics	MIA	MISS
First downs	28	23
Plays–yards	88–459	60–398
Rushes–yards	51–191	21–121
Passing yards	268	277
Passing: Comp–Att–Int	23–37–1	23–39–0
Turnovers	1	0
Time of possession	41:22	18:38

Team	Category	Player	Statistics
Miami	Passing	Carson Beck	23/37, 262 yards, 2 TD, INT
Miami	Rushing	Mark Fletcher Jr.	22 carries, 133 yards
Miami	Receiving	Keelan Marion	7 receptions, 114 yards, TD
Ole Miss	Passing	Trinidad Chambliss	23/37, 277 yards, TD
Ole Miss	Rushing	Kewan Lacy	11 carries, 103 yards, TD
Ole Miss	Receiving	De'Zhaun Stribling	5 receptions, 77 yards

== Personnel ==
=== Coaching staff ===
Coach	Title	Year at Ole Miss	Previous job
Pete Golding	Head Coach/DC/LB	3rd	Alabama (DC/LB)
Charlie Weis Jr.	OC/QB	4th	South Florida (OC/QB)
Joe Judge	QB	2nd	New England Patriots (AHC)
Wes Neighbors III	S	3rd	Maryland (S)
Randall Joyner	DL	5th	SMU (DL)
Bryan Brown	Co-DC/Secondary	2nd	Cincinnati (AHC/DC)
John Garrison	OL	3rd	NC State (OL)
Joe Cox	Co-OC/TE	2nd	Alabama (TE)
Jake Schoonover	Assistant HC/STC/Nickelbacks	3rd	Arkansas State (STC)
George McDonald	WR/PGC	2nd	Illinois (AHC/WR)
Kevin Smith	RB	5th	Miami (RB)

=== Roster ===
2025 Ole Miss Rebels Football
Quarterbacks: 6 – Trinidad Chambliss – Senior (6'1, 200) – Grand Rapids, Michigan; 13 – Austin Simmons – Sophomore (6'4, 215) – Pinecrest, Florida; 15 – AJ Maddox – Redshirt Freshman (6'1, 185) – Hattiesburg, Mississippi; 17 – Maealiuaki Smith – Redshirt Freshman (6'4, 190) – Sacramento, California; 20 – Shawqi Itraish – Senior (6'3, 215) – Bradenton, Florida; 23 – George Hamsley – Junior (6'5, 220) – Memphis, Tennessee; Running backs: 5 – Kewan Lacy – Sophomore (5'11, 200) – Dallas, Texas; 12 – Damien Taylor – Senior (5'10, 220) – Northport, Alabama; 22 – Logan Diggs – Redshirt Senior (6'1, 215) – Boutte, Louisiana; 24 – Shekai Mills-Knight – Freshman (6'3, 220) – Montreal, Quebec, Canada; 25 – Trey Hall – Junior (5'11, 185) – Vicksburg, Mississippi; 26 – Domonique Thomas – Senior (5'9, 210) – Ohatchee, Alabama; 27 – Macaleb Taylor – Freshman (5'10, 195) – Grenada, Mississippi; 37 – Austin Acton – Sophomore (5'11, 200) – Meridian, Mississippi; Wide receivers: 1 – De'Zhaun Stribling – Senior (6'2, 200) – Kapolei, Hawaii; 2 – Harrison Wallace III – Senior (6'1, 195) – Montgomery, Alabama; 3 – Caleb Cunningham – Freshman (6'3, 190) – Weir, Mississippi; 4 – Caleb Odom – Sophomore (6'5, 215) – Carrollton, Georgia (Georgia (U.S. state)); 7 – Traylon Ray – Junior (6'1, 195) – Tallahassee, Florida; 11 – Deuce Alexander – Sophomore (6'0, 175) – Douglasville, Georgia (Georgia (U.S. state)); 14 – Izaiah Hartrup – Senior (6'0, 180) – O'Fallon, Missouri; 16 – Winston Watkins – Freshman (6'2, 185) – Fort Myers, Florida; 19 – Cayden Lee – Junior (5'11, 175) – Kennesaw, Georgia (Georgia (U.S. state)); 39 – Ciaran Pedulla – Redshirt Freshman (6'3, 205) – Edmond, Oklahoma; 43 – Dylan Davis – Redshirt Sophomore (6'0, 180) – Frisco, Texas; 47 – Anthony Aguirre – Junior (6'4, 205) – Spokane, Washington (Washington (state)); 81 – Samari Reed – Freshman (6'2, 195) – Margate, Florida; 82 – Joshua Pfeifer – Senior (6'1, 185) – Nashville, Tennessee; 83 – Levi Blount – Freshman (6'1, 190) – Oxford, Mississippi; 84 – Dillon Alfred – Freshman (6'0, 180) – Gautier, Mississippi; 86 – Mac Owen – Junior (6'0, 185) – Tunica, Mississippi; 88 – Devin Price – Redshirt Senior (6'3, 195) – College Station, Texas; Tight ends: 8 – Dae'Quan Wright – Senior (6'4, 255) – Perry, Georgia (Georgia (U.S. state)); 9 – Luke Hasz – Junior (6'3, 240) – Bixby, Oklahoma; 42 – Jack Harper – Redshirt Freshman (6'5, 240) – Oxford, Mississippi; 47 – Wyatt Smalley – Sophomore (6'3, 215) – Milton, Georgia (Georgia (U.S. state)); 49 – Sean Judge – Redshirt Freshman (6'5, 220) – Attleboro, Massachusetts; 80 – Hayden Bradley – Freshman (6'4, 230) – Buford, Georgia (Georgia (U.S. state)); 85 – Trace Bruckler – Senior (6'3, 244) – Frisco, Texas; Kicker/Punter: 17 – Lucas Carneiro – Junior (5'11, 190) – Cornelius, North Carolina; 44 – Oscar Bird – Freshman (6'4, 205) – Sydney, Australia; 45 – Mike Baker – Redshirt Freshman (5'9, 180) – Wilmette, Illinois; Long snappers: 90 - Kortlen Wilfawn - Junior (6'3, 245) – Oxford, Mississippi; 93 – Carter Short – Senior (5'9, 195) – Hoover, Alabama; 94 – Caleb Blankenship – Redshirt Freshman (6'2, 220) – Ashdown, Arkansas	Offensive Lineman: 50 – Jayden Williams – Senior (6'4, 315) – Conway, Arkansas; 51 – Delano Townsend – Sophomore (6'4, 315) – Flint, Michigan; 52 – Cooper Johnson – Redshirt Freshman (6'6, 315) – Lincoln, Nebraska; 53 – Trey Nightingale – Redshirt Freshman (6'2, 270) – Wyckoff, New Jersey; 55 – Terez Davis – Sophomore (6'4, 310) – Hyattsville, Maryland; 56 – Mason Waddle – Freshman (6'0, 250) – Tupelo, Mississippi; 57 – TJ Hedrick – Freshman (6'5, 285) – Columbia, Missouri; 58 – Jude Foster – Redshirt Freshman (6'3, 305) – Baton Rouge, Louisiana; 61 – Diego Pounds – Senior (6'6, 340) – Raleigh, North Carolina; 62 – Brycen Sanders – Sophomore (6'6, 310) – Chattanooga, Tennessee; 65 – Connor Howes – Freshman (6'6, 310) – Saint Cloud, Florida; 69 – Joe Koury – Redshirt Freshman (6'1, 290) – Madison, Mississippi; 70 – Devin Harper – Freshman (6'5, 315) – Shreveport, Louisiana; 71 – PJ Wilkins – Sophomore (6'7, 340) – Atlanta, Georgia (Georgia (U.S. state)); 73 – Percy Lewis – Senior (6'7, 355) – Sallis, Mississippi; 75 – Patrick Kutas – Junior (6'5, 315) – Memphis, Tennessee; 76 – John Wayne Oliver – Redshirt Freshman (6'5, 295) – Nashville, Tennessee; 77 – Ethan Fields – Sophomore (6'3, 320) – Geismar, Louisiana; Defensive Lineman: 1 – Princewill Umanmielen – Junior (6'5, 245) – Austin, Texas; 5 – Kam Franklin – Sophomore (6'5, 275) – Lake Cormorant, Mississippi; 15 – Da'Shawn Womack – Junior (6'5, 260) – Baltimore, Maryland; 35 – Cam Clark – Redshirt Freshman (6'3, 250) – Medina, Tennessee; 45 – Talib Graham – Freshman (6'2, 245) – Daphne, Alabama; 47 – DeeJay Holmes Jr. – Sophomore (6'0, 245) – Pahokee, Florida; 51 – Zxavian Harris – Senior (6'7, 320) – Canton, Mississippi; 52 – Will Echoles – Sophomore (6'3, 310) – Houston, Mississippi; 55 – Lakendrick Clancy – Redshirt Freshman (6'0, 280) – Northport, Alabama; 57 – Paris Evans – Redshirt Freshman (6'3, 260) – Waynesboro, Mississippi; 90 – Jeffery Rush – Redshirt Freshman (6'1, 265) – Pascagoula, Mississippi; 92 – Jon Seaton – Senior (6'1, 300) – Hillsborough Township, New Jersey; 93 – Corey Amos – Freshman (6'3, 210) – Opelousas, Louisiana; 94 – Tavion Prather – Senior (6'3, 285) – Oxford, Mississippi; 95 – Andrew Maddox – Freshman (6'4, 280) – Hattiesburg, Mississippi; 96 – Jamarious Brown – Sophomore (6'1, 315) – Moss Point, Mississippi; 97 – Kamron Beavers – Redshirt Freshman (6'3, 255) – Bay Springs, Mississippi; 99 – Caleb James – Senior (5'11, 300) – Cypress, Texas	Linebackers: 4 – Suntarine Perkins – Junior (6'1, 210) – Raleigh, Mississippi; 6 – TJ Dottery – Junior (6'1, 225) – Montgomery, Alabama; 12 – Andrew Jones – Graduate (6'2, 220) – Marrero, Louisiana; 22 – Raymond Collins – Redshirt Junior (6'1, 235) – Gulfport, Mississippi; 23 – Jarcoby Hopson – Freshman (6'2, 210) – Tunica, Mississippi; 26 – Tahj Chambers – Senior (6'2, 225) – Arlington, Texas; 30 – Jaden Yates – Junior (6'1, 215) – Columbus, Ohio; 34 – Tyler Banks – Senior (6'2, 245) – Blackstone, Virginia; 42 – Bryson Walters – Freshman (6'2, 200) – Fulton, Mississippi; 46 – Cooper Cannon – Freshman (5'11, 215) – West Helena, Arkansas; 48 – Mark Trigg Jr. – Sophomore (6'2, 200) – Roswell, Georgia (Georgia (U.S. state)); 53 – Ford Beeker – Freshman (5'11, 210) – Tuscaloosa, Alabama; Defensive backs: 3 – Sage Ryan – Senior (5'11, 200) – Lafayette, Louisiana; 7 – Travaris "TJ" Banks – Sophomore (6'1, 190) – Tuscaloosa, Alabama; 9 – Ricky Fletcher – Junior (6'3, 200) – Durant, Mississippi; 11 – Jaylon Braxton – Sophomore (6'0, 190) – Frisco, Texas; 13 – Cedrick Beavers – Redshirt Junior (5'10, 175) – Taylorsville, Mississippi; 14 – Kapena Gushiken – Senior (6'0, 185) – Pukalani, Hawaii; 16 – Wydett Williams Jr. – Senior (6'2, 205) – Lake Providence, Louisiana; 19 – MJ Preston – Freshman (6'1, 190) – Petersburg, Virginia; 20 – Anthony Robinson III – Redshirt Freshman (5'11, 195) – St. Rose, Louisiana; 21 – Tavoy Feagin – Redshirt Freshman (6'0, 180) – Tampa, Florida; 24 – Andy Jaffe – Sophomore (6'0, 185) – Tampa, Florida; 25 – Maison Dunn – Freshman (6'3, 185) – Tupelo, Mississippi; 27 – Pat Broomfield – Redshirt Freshman (6'1, 155) – Clarksdale, Mississippi; 28 – Dante Core – Freshman (5'11, 165) – Fort Walton Beach, Florida; 29 – Nick Cull – Junior (5'11, 180) – Donalsonville, Georgia (Georgia (U.S. state)); 31 – Ladarian Clardy – Freshman (6'0, 175) – Pensacola, Florida; 32 – Chris Graves – Junior (6'0, 185) – Fort Myers, Florida; 33 – Antonio Kite – Junior (6'0, 180) – Anniston, Alabama; 36 – Keon Young – Freshman (6'0, 180) – Bartow, Florida; 37 – Cortez Thomas – Freshman (6'1, 185) – Lexington, Mississippi; 39 – Zach Johansen – Junior (5'10, 205) – Suwanee, Georgia (Georgia (U.S. state)); 40 – Micah Stallworth – Redshirt Freshman (5'11, 200) – Ridgeland, Mississippi; 41 – John Ross Ashley – Sophomore (5'11, 180) – Vestavia Hills, Alabama; 43 – Israel Solomon – Junior (5'9, 175) – Dallas, Texas; 44 – Kegan Sherwood – Freshman (6'2, 180) – Belton, Texas
Legend: (C) Team captain; (S) Suspended; (I) Ineligible; Injured

=== Depth chart ===
Defense

NB
3 Sage Ryan
0 Traylon Ray
⋅

FS
16 Wydett Williams
7 TJ Banks
⋅

LB	LB
30 Jaden Yates	6 TJ Dottery
26 Tahj Chambers	44 Andrew Jones
⋅	⋅

SS
14 Kapena Gushiken
29 Nick Cull
⋅

CB
32 Chris Graves Jr.
9 Rickey Fletcher
⋅

DE	DT	DT	DE
5 Kam Franklin	51 Zxavian Harris	52 Will Echoles	4 Suntarine Perkins; 1 Princewill Umanmielen
15 Da'Shawn Womack	97 Kamron Beavers	96 Jamarious Brown	47 Deejay Holms
⋅	⋅	⋅	⋅

CB
8 Antonio Kite
2 Jaylon Braxton
⋅

Offense

WR
2 Harrison Wallace III
11 Deuce Alexander
88 Devin Price

WR
19 Cayden Lee
17 Winston Watkins
⋅

LT	LG	C	RG	RT
61 Diego Pounds	51 Delano Townsend	62 Brycen Sanders	75 Patrick Kutas	50 Jayden Williams
55 Terez Davis	71 PJ Wilkins	69 Joe Koury	77 Ethan Fields	70 Devin Harper
⋅	⋅	⋅	⋅	⋅

TE
8 Dae'Quan Wright
85 Trace Buckler
4 Caleb Odom

WR
1 De'Zhaun Stribling
15 Izaiah Hartrup
⋅

QB
6 Trinidad Chambliss
13 Austin Simmons
⋅

Key reserves

Special teams

RB
5 Kewan Lacy
22 Logan Diggs
12 Damien Taylor

=== Transfers ===
==== Outgoing ====
Player	Position	Destination
Jason Albritton	RB	East Tennessee State
Rashad Amos	RB	Memphis
Katrevrick Banks	CB	Grambling State
CJ Barney	LB	Murray State
Kenneth Boston	OL	Grambling State
Kavion Broussard	IOL	Arkansas
AJ Brown	CB	Georgia Southern
Chamberlain Campbell	EDGE	Toledo
Jadon Canady	CB	Oregon
Pierce Clarkson	QB	UCLA
Preston Cushman	OT	UCF
Shamaar Darden	S	Unknown
Micah Davis	WR	Southern Miss
Daniel Demery	LB	Arkansas State
Cam East	OT	Tulsa
Raphael Ekechi	RB	Unknown
Rodney Groce Jr.	LB	Unknown
George Hamsley	QB	Unknown
Dillon Hipp	TE	Missouri State
Jarnorris Hopson	WR	Lane
Walker Howard	QB	Louisiana
Jackson Jones	WR	Unknown
Matt Jones	RB	Southern Miss
Justin Kowalak	QB	Fort Hays State
Key Lawrence	S	UCLA
Jack Mills	IOL	Unknown
Louis Moore	S	Indiana
Micah Pettus	OT	Florida State
Ali Scott	RB	Unknown
Jordon Simmons	RB	Georgia State
Jordan Smart	WR	Arkansas State
Akelo Stone	DL	Georgia Tech
Mana Taimani	IOL	Colorado
Noreel White	WR	East Mississippi CC
Trip White	LB	Oklahoma State
Ayden Williams	WR	Mississippi State

==== Incoming ====
Player	Position	Previous School
Deuce Alexander	WR	Wake Forest
Jaylon Braxton	CB	Arkansas
Trace Bruckler	TE	New Mexico
Lucas Carneiro	K	Western Kentucky
Tahj Chambers	LB	Missouri State
Trinidad Chambliss	QB	Ferris State
Pierce Clarkson	QB	Louisville
Terez Davis	OT	Maryland
Tavoy Feagin	CB	Clemson
Ricky Fletcher	CB	South Alabama
Kapena Gushiken	S	Washington State
Trey Hall	RB	Mississippi Gulf Coast CC
George Hamsley	QB	Tennessee State
Luke Hasz	TE	Arkansas
Shawqi Itraish	QB	Rice
Caleb James	DT	Baylor
Andrew Jones	LB	Grambling State
Antonio Kite	CB	Auburn
Patrick Kutas	IOL	Arkansas
Kewan Lacy	RB	Missouri
Percy Lewis	OT	Auburn
Caleb Odom	WR	Alabama
Traylon Ray	WR	West Virginia
Sage Ryan	S	LSU
Jordon Simmons	RB	Akron
Israel Solomon	CB	Hawaii
Maealiuaki Smith	QB	Oklahoma State
De'Zhaun Stribling	WR	Oklahoma State
Damien Taylor	RB	Troy
Delano Townsend	IOL	UAB
Princewill Umanmielen	EDGE	Nebraska
Harrison Wallace III	WR	Penn State
PJ Wilkins	IOL	Charlotte
Wydett Williams	S	Louisiana–Monroe
Da'Shawn Womack	EDGE	LSU
Jaden Yates	LB	Marshall
