= Lucas Carneiro =

American football player (born 2004)

No. 17 – Ole Miss Rebels
- Position: Placekicker
- Class: Redshirt Senior

Personal information
- Born: May 25, 2004 (age 22); Boston, Massachusetts, U.S.
- Listed height: 5 ft 11 in (1.80 m)
- Listed weight: 195 lb (88 kg)

Career information
- High school: Community School of Davidson (Davidson, North Carolina)
- College: Western Kentucky (2022–2024); Ole Miss (2025–present)

Awards and highlights
- CUSA Special Teams Player of the Year (2024); First-team All-CUSA (2024)
- Stats at ESPN

Lucas Booth Carneiro (born May 25, 2004) is an American football kicker for the Ole Miss Rebels. He previously played for the Western Kentucky Hilltoppers.

== Early life ==
Carneiro was born in Boston, Massachusetts and moved to North Carolina when he was two. He attended Community School of Davidson in Davidson, North Carolina where he played soccer before beginning placekicking as a junior. He committed to play college football for the Western Kentucky Hilltoppers.

== College career ==
=== Western Kentucky ===
After redshirting as a freshman in 2022, he took over as the Hilltoppers starting kicker in 2023, and went nine for 12 on his field goal attempts. In week 7 of the 2024 season, he notched a season-high 14 points in a victory versus UTEP. During the 2024 season, Carneiro went 18 for 19 on his field goal attempts, while also converting on all 41 extra point attempts, earning Conference USA Special Teams Player of the Year honors. After the conclusion of the 2024 season, he entered the NCAA transfer portal.

=== Ole Miss ===
Carneiro transferred to play for the Ole Miss Rebels. In week 2 of the 2025 season, he was named the SEC Special Teams Player of the Week after converting on three of his four field goal attempts in a win over Kentucky. In the 2026 Sugar Bowl, Carneiro went three for three on his field goals, including a 56-yard field goal and the game-winning 47-yard field goal, in an upset win over Georgia.

=== Statistics ===
Legend
	Led FBS
**Bold**	Career High

Season	Team	GP	Kicking						
Season	Team	GP	Extra Points			Field Goals			TP
Season	Team	GP	XP	Att	Pct	FG	Att	Pct	TP
2022	Western Kentucky	2	Redshirted						
2023	Western Kentucky	13	47	47	**100.0**	9	12	75.0	74
2024	Western Kentucky	14	41	41	**100.0**	18	19	**94.7**	95
2025	Ole Miss	**15**	**56**	**56**	**100.0**	**31**	**35**	88.6	**149**
2026	Ole Miss	3	13	13	**100.0**	5	7	71.4	28
Career		47	157	157	100.0	63	73	86.3	346
