= Deuce Alexander =

American football player (born 2005)

No. 1 – Ole Miss Rebels
- Position: Wide receiver
- Class: Redshirt Junior

Personal information
- Born: July 27, 2005 (age 21)
- Listed height: 6 ft 0 in (1.83 m)
- Listed weight: 180 lb (82 kg)

Career information
- High school: Douglas County (Douglasville, Georgia)
- College: Wake Forest (2023–2024); Ole Miss (2025–present)
- Stats at ESPN

Hilton Dekeith "Deuce" Alexander II (born July 27, 2005) is an American college football wide receiver for the Ole Miss Rebels. He previously played for the Wake Forest Demon Deacons.

== Early life ==
Hilton Dekeith Alexander II was born on July 27, 2005, to Hilton and Karen Alexander. He attended Douglas County High School in Douglasville, Georgia, where he was a four-year letterwinner in football. As a junior, Alexander posted 53 receptions for 669 yards and five touchdowns. He led the Tigers to a berth in the Georgia High School Association (GHSA) Class 6A playoffs. As a senior, Alexander led the county with 52 catches for 766 yards and six touchdowns, averaging over 100 all-purpose yards per game and leading his team to another GHSA Class 6A playoff appearance. He finished his high school career with 105 receptions for 1,435 yards and 11 touchdowns. Alexander also participated in track and field. He won the county championship in the 400-meter dash in 2021 with a time of 49.36 seconds.

Alexander was rated as a consensus three-star recruit. On May 26, 2022, he committed to playing college football for the Wake Forest Demon Deacons over offers from schools such as Pittsburgh, Georgia Tech, Wisconsin, Western Kentucky, and UNLV. "It really came down to the fact that I was getting recruited by the whole coaching staff," Alexander said. He signed with the Demon Deacons in December.

== College career ==
=== Wake Forest ===
As a freshman in 2023, Alexander appeared in two games and took a redshirt, recording two catches for 30 yards and one touchdown. His first career reception was a 19-yard touchdown catch to convert a fourth down in a 26–6 loss to NC State. The following year, Alexander played every game for the Demon Deacons and registered 36 catches for 400 yards and two touchdowns. He scored against North Carolina A&T and Louisiana. After the 2024 season, Alexander entered the NCAA transfer portal. He was rated as a four- and three-star transfer recruit by 247Sports and Rivals.com, respectively.

=== Ole Miss ===
On December 22, 2024, Alexander announced that he would transfer to play with the Ole Miss Rebels. He arrived on campus in January 2025 and enrolled as a midyear transfer. Alexander had a strong showing in both spring and fall camps. "Deuce has had a great camp", said Rebels head coach Lane Kiffin during the latter, describing him as "electric" and "dynamic" before praising his work ethic and conditioning. On September 20, Alexander posted four receptions for a career-high 94 yards and one touchdown in a 45–10 win over Tulane. On November 28, he caught an 88-yard touchdown pass from quarterback Trinidad Chambliss, breaking the school record for longest passing touchdown, to help the Rebels to a 38–19 win over Mississippi State and clinch a spot in the College Football Playoff. In the first round of the playoffs against Tulane, Alexander posted a career-high seven receptions for 87 yards in a 41–10 win. In the next round, he hauled in a 32-yard diving one-handed catch in the Sugar Bowl, helping the Rebels to a 39–34 win over Georgia. Alexander finished the 2025 season with 44 catches for 684 yards and two touchdowns. He also rushed for 122 yards on 19 carries.

In January 2026, it was announced that Alexander would return to Ole Miss for his redshirt junior season. He entered the 2026 season as one of the most experienced returning receivers on the team due to a high roster turnover. Alexander stepped into a leadership role in the position group and was granted a jersey switch from No. 11 to No. 1, which he had requested from new head coach Pete Golding during the previous postseason. "I just felt like it was time for a change," he said. "Just making history, stepping into that role... wearing that No. 1 at Ole Miss and trying to be one of the greats." Alexander received preseason All-Southeastern Conference (SEC) honors from multiple outlets. He was also named to Bruce Feldman's Freaks List, an annual ranking of the top "freak" athletes in college football.

=== Statistics ===
Season	Team	GP	Receiving				Rushing				Punt Returns			
Season	Team	GP	Rec	Yds	Avg	TD	Att	Yds	Avg	TD	Ret	Yds	Avg	TD
2023	Wake Forest	2	2	30	15.0	1	0	0	0.0	0	0	0	0.0	0
2024	Wake Forest	12	36	400	11.1	2	2	6	3.0	0	0	0	0.0	0
2025	Ole Miss	15	44	684	15.5	2	19	122	6.4	0	0	0	0.0	0
2026	Ole Miss	2	13	235	18.1	2	0	0	0.0	0	1	6	6.0	0
Career		31	95	1,349	14.2	7	21	128	6.1	0	1	6	6.0	0

== Personal life ==
His father, Hilton, played with the San Francisco 49ers and New Orleans Saints after a storied collegiate career at Morris Brown College. His sister, Kayla, ran track at Louisville and Texas Tech.
