= Patrick Kutas =

American football player (born 2004)

No. 75 – Ole Miss Rebels
- Position: Guard
- Class: Redshirt Senior

Personal information
- Born: August 12, 2004 (age 22)
- Listed height: 6 ft 6 in (1.98 m)
- Listed weight: 315 lb (143 kg)

Career information
- High school: Christian Brothers (TN); Memphis, TN
- College: Arkansas (2022–2024); Ole Miss (2025–present)

Awards and highlights
- Kent Hull Trophy (2025)
- Stats at ESPN

Patrick Wayne Kutas Jr. (born August 12, 2004) is an American college football guard for the Ole Miss Rebels. He previously played for the Arkansas Razorbacks.

== Early life ==
Kutas played high school football at Christian Brothers High School in Memphis. He played on both the offensive and defensive lines. As a senior he was named to the D2AAA West All-Region Team and helped Christian Brothers to an 8-5 record and state semifinal appearance. He was rated the No. 5 prospect in Tennessee and No. 10 interior offensive lineman nationally by 247Sports. He committed to Arkansas on July 17, 2021.

== College career ==
=== Arkansas ===
During his freshman season with Arkansas, Kutas played all 13 games primarily on special teams where he saw 124 snaps. The following season, he started along the offensive line in nine games before suffering a season ending injury. After suffering a back injury early in fall camp, Kutas was sidelined for most of the 2024 season. After missing the first seven games of the season, he debuted against Mississippi State on October 26. He worked with then-head coach Sam Pittman to preserve his redshirt for this season. In exchange for redshirting, Kutas assured Pittman he would not transfer and use the extra season granted by the redshirt elsewhere.

On December 5, 2024, Kutas announced plans to enter the transfer portal.

=== Ole Miss ===
Kutas announced he would transfer to Ole Miss on December 13, 2024. He arrived on campus in January and participated in spring drills with the Rebels. In November, Kutas was announced as the recipient of the 2025 Kent Hull Trophy. Despite Lane Kiffin's departure at the end of 2025, Kutas chose to remain at Ole Miss for the 2026 season. When asked about Pete Golding, Kiffin's replacement, Kutas said, "[e]veryone who is here wants to be here. Everyone’s bought into Coach Golding’s vision, so now we just have to go out and execute it."

== Personal life ==
Kutas is the son of Pat and Suzanne Kutas. He has three sisters, Sarah, Elizabeth and Mary Margaret, and has one brother, Hayes.
