= Community School of Davidson =

American charter school in North Carolina

Location
- 404 Armour Street; Davidson, North Carolina 28036; United States
- 35°30′28″N 80°51′11″W

Information
- Other name: CSD
- School type: Charter
- Founded: 2001 (25 years ago)
- School district: Mecklenburg
- CEEB code: 340973
- Principal: Juli Gardner
- Grades: K–12
- Colors: Blue and white
- Athletics: Football, tennis, cross country, golf, swimming and diving, basketball, baseball, indoor track, outdoor track, lacrosse, soccer, softball, volleyball
- Rival: Pine Lake Prep
- Website: www.csdspartans.org

Community School of Davidson (CSD) is a public charter school located in Davidson, North Carolina. Their mascot is the Spartans. The school was founded by Joy Warner, the current Executive Director, and opened in 2001 as Children's Community School and adopted its current name in 2009.

When CSD originally started under the name Children's Community School in 2001, it was a secular private school out of Lake Norman Baptist Church in Huntersville, North Carolina. The school originally had only one kindergarten class, but it expanded by one grade over its first three years. In its fourth year, it became a charter school. With the school now having around 60 students, the directors decided that a new building was needed to accommodate the larger number of students, so they purchased the former Elox manufacturing facility in Davidson, NC.

== Notable alumni ==
- Lucas Carneiro, college football placekicker for the Ole Miss Rebels
