= Zxavian Harris =

American football player (born 2003)

Profile
- Position: Defensive tackle

Personal information
- Born: October 22, 2003 (age 23)
- Listed height: 6 ft 8 in (2.03 m)
- Listed weight: 330 lb (150 kg)

Career information
- High school: Germantown (Gluckstadt, Mississippi)
- College: Ole Miss (2022–2025)
- NFL draft: 2026: undrafted

Career history
- New Orleans Saints (2026)*
- * Offseason or practice squad member only
- Stats at Pro Football Reference

Zxavian Emmanuel Harris (born October 22, 2003) is an American professional football defensive tackle. He played college football for the Ole Miss Rebels.

== Early life ==
Zxavien Emmanuel Harris was born in Canton, Mississippi, and attended Germantown High School in nearby Gluckstadt, Mississippi. As a sophomore he recorded 62 tackles, 8.5 sacks and 17 quarterback hurries. Coming out of high school, Harris was rated as a four-star recruit and committed to play college football for the Ole Miss Rebels over schools such as Mississippi State, Alabama, Georgia, LSU and Tennessee.

== College career ==
As a freshman in 2022, Harris appeared in all 13 games, notching three tackles. In week ten of the 2023 season, he blocked the game-tying field goal in a 38-35 win versus Texas A&M. During the 2023 season, Harris played in all 13 games where he recorded 30 tackles with three and a half being for a loss, and a blocked field goal. In 2024, he totaled 32 tackles with four and a half going for a loss, a sack and a half, and a forced fumble.

== Professional career ==
Pre-draft measurables
Height	Weight	Arm length	Hand span	Wingspan
6 ft 7 3/4 in (2.03 m)	330 lb (150 kg)	34 5/8 in (0.88 m)	10 in (0.25 m)	6 ft 11 3/4 in (2.13 m)
All values from NFL Combine

Harris was the best available player not drafted in 2026 according to ESPN (ranked as the 63rd-best player and fifth-best defensive tackle). On May 1, 2026, the New Orleans Saints signed Harris as an undrafted free agent. He was waived by the Saints on August 8.

After being waived, he was set to sign with Louisiana State University. On August 25, the SEC passed a rule that would ban NFL players from returning to college, which would make Harris ineligible to play for LSU. Harris was not added to LSU's roster before the start of the college football season.

On September 17, the NFL sent out a league memo stating that Harris (and Dae'Quan Wright) were ineligible to join any teams for the 2026 NFL season. However, on October 13, the NFL reversed course, allowing Harris to sign with NFL teams.

== Personal life ==
On July 16, 2023, Harris was arrested on multiple charges including a DUI, reckless driving, being a minor in possession, not using headlights and running a stop sign. He was arrested again on August 14, 2024, on charges of domestic violence and obstructing arrest.
