= Kapena Gushiken =

American football player (born 2002)

No. 34 – Indianapolis Colts
- Position: Safety
- Roster status: Active

Personal information
- Born: August 15, 2002 (age 24); Pukalani, Hawaii, U.S.
- Listed height: 5 ft 10 in (1.78 m)
- Listed weight: 189 lb (86 kg)

Career information
- High school: Kamehameha (Pukalani, Hawaii)
- College: Saddleback (2021–2022); Washington State (2023–2024); Ole Miss (2025)
- NFL draft: 2026: undrafted

Career history
- Philadelphia Eagles (2026)*; Indianapolis Colts (2026–present)
- * Offseason or practice squad member only

Career NFL statistics as of Week 8, 2026
- Total tackles: 7
- Pass deflections: 1
- Stats at Pro Football Reference

Steven Kapena Gushiken (born August 15, 2002), nicknamed "Gush", is an American professional football safety for the Indianapolis Colts of the National Football League (NFL). He played college football for the Washington State Cougars, Saddleback Bobcats, and Ole Miss Rebels.

== Early life ==
Gushiken attended Kamehameha High School. He was not a highly-recruited college football prospect, committing to play for the Saddleback Bobcats. He has Native Hawaiian and Japanese ancestry.

== College career ==
=== Saddleback College ===
Gushiken plated two seasons at Saddleback College from 2021 to 2022, earning All-National Division Southern League First Team honors in 2022. He was the 7th ranked JUCO cornerback.

=== Washington State ===
Gushiken committed to play for the Washington State Cougars. In week 6 of the 2023 season, he recorded three tackles, a sack, a pass deflection, and an interception which he returned 88 yards for a touchdown versus UCLA. In week 2 of the 2024 season, Gushiken recorded five tackles with one being for a loss and an interception in a win over Texas Tech. During his two seasons as a Cougar from 2023 through 2024, he played in 25 games with 16 starts, where he totaled 88 tackles three interceptions, a fumble recovery, and a touchdown, where after the conclusion of the 2024 season he entered his name into the NCAA transfer portal.

=== Ole Miss ===
Gushiken transferred to play for the Ole Miss Rebels. He entered the 2025 season as a starter in the Rebels secondary. In week 8 of the 2025 season, Gushiken notched six tackles in a loss versus Georgia.

== Professional career ==
Pre-draft measurables
Height	Weight	Arm length	Hand span	Wingspan	40-yard dash	10-yard split	20-yard split	20-yard shuttle	Three-cone drill	Vertical jump	Broad jump	Bench press
5 ft 9 7/8 in (1.77 m)	189 lb (86 kg)	29 3/8 in (0.75 m)	9 1/8 in (0.23 m)	6 ft 1 1/8 in (1.86 m)	4.35 s	1.49 s	2.50 s	4.27 s	6.77 s	40.0 in (1.02 m)	11 ft 0 in (3.35 m)	17 reps
All values from Pro Day

=== Philadelphia Eagles ===
After going unselected in the 2026 NFL draft, Gushiken signed with the Philadelphia Eagles as an undrafted free agent. He was waived by the Eagles as a part of final roster cuts on August 30, 2026.

=== Indianapolis Colts ===
On August 31, 2026, the Indianapolis Colts claimed Gushiken off of waivers.
