= Luke Hasz =

American football player (born 2004)

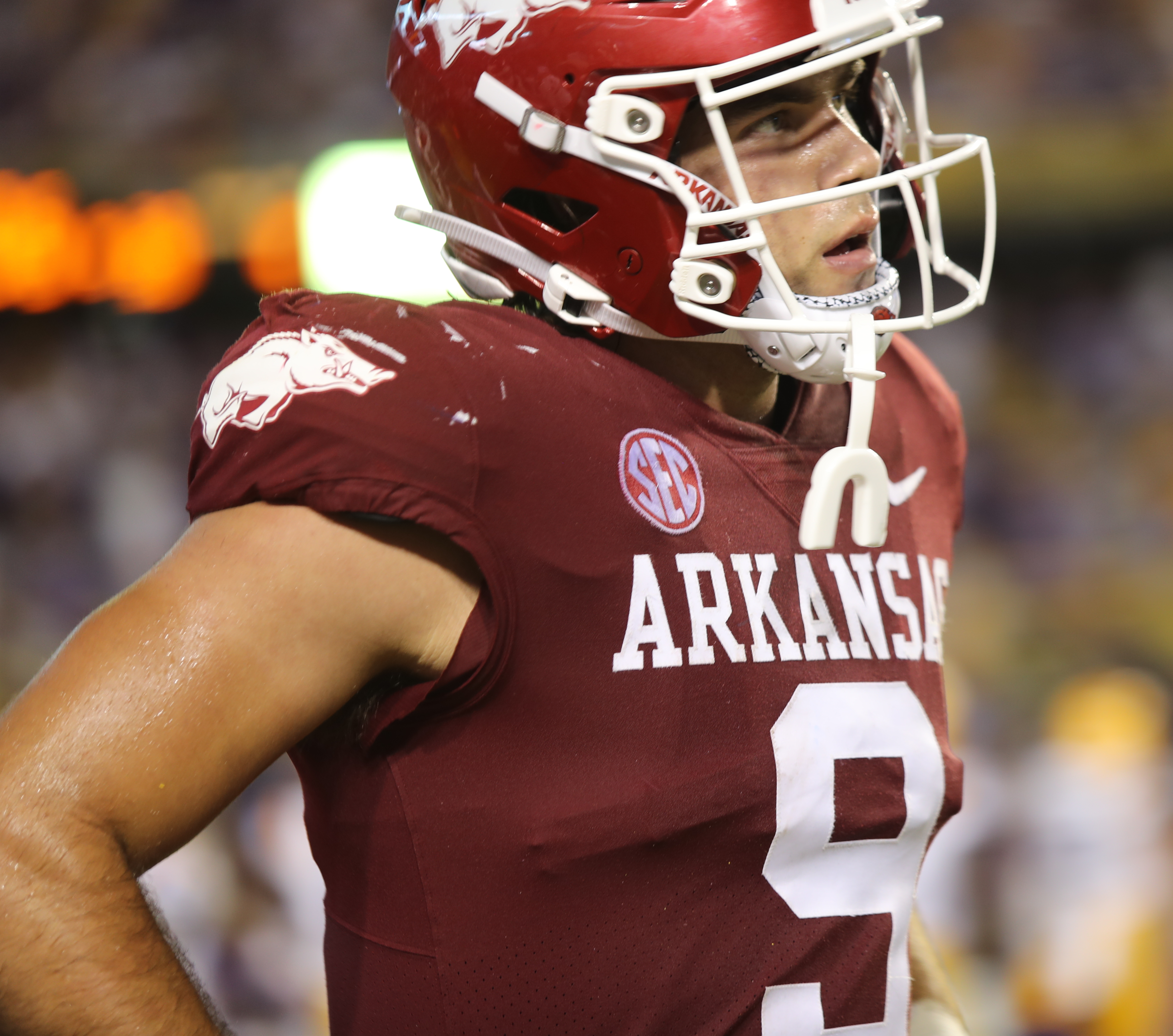
- Hasz in 2023

No. 9 – Ole Miss Rebels
- Position: Tight end
- Class: Senior

Personal information
- Born: April 19, 2004 (age 22)
- Listed height: 6 ft 3 in (1.91 m)
- Listed weight: 242 lb (110 kg)

Career information
- High school: Bixby (Bixby, Oklahoma)
- College: Arkansas (2023–2024); Ole Miss (2025–present)
- Stats at ESPN

Luke Hasz (born April 19, 2004) is an American college football tight end for the Ole Miss Rebels. He previously played for the Arkansas Razorbacks.

== Career ==
Hasz attended Bixby High School in Bixby, Oklahoma. Over his final three high school seasons, he had 100 receptions for 1,736 yards and 20 touchdowns. He was selected to play in the 2023 Under Armour All-America Game. Hasz committed to the University of Arkansas to play college football.

=== Arkansas ===
Hasz earned immediate playing time his true freshman year in 2023. In his first career game, he had two receptions for 19 yards.

On December 5, 2024, Hasz announced that he would enter the transfer portal.

Season	Team	GP	Receiving				
Season	Team	GP	Rec	Yds	Avg	TD	2PM
2023	Arkansas	5	16	253	15.8	3	1
2024	Arkansas	12	26	324	12.5	4	0
2025	Ole Miss	12	3	28	9.3	1	0
2026	Ole Miss	2	3	17	5.7	0	0
Career		31	48	622	13.0	8	1

== Personal life ==
His twin brother, Dylan, also plays college football at Arkansas.
