= Daylen Everette =

American football player (born 2004)

No. 23 – Pittsburgh Steelers
- Position: Cornerback
- Roster status: Active

Personal information
- Born: May 6, 2004 (age 22); Norfolk, Virginia, U.S.
- Listed height: 6 ft 1 in (1.85 m)
- Listed weight: 196 lb (89 kg)

Career information
- High school: Norview (Norfolk, Virginia); IMG Academy (Bradenton, Florida)
- College: Georgia (2022–2025)
- NFL draft: 2026: 3rd round, 85th overall pick

Career history
- Pittsburgh Steelers (2026–present)

Awards and highlights
- First-team All-SEC (2025)

Career NFL statistics as of Week 10, 2026
- Total tackles: 20
- Forced fumbles: 1
- Fumble recoveries: 1
- Pass deflections: 5
- Interceptions: 1
- Stats at Pro Football Reference

Daylen Kade Everette (born May 6, 2004) is an American professional football cornerback for the Pittsburgh Steelers of the National Football League (NFL). He played college football for the Georgia Bulldogs and was selected by the Steelers in the third round of the 2026 NFL draft.

== Early life ==
Everette originally attended Norview High School in Norfolk, Virginia, before transferring to IMG Academy in Bradenton, Florida. He was selected to play in the 2022 Under Armour All-American Game. A five-star recruit, Everette originally committed to play college football at Clemson University before flipping to the University of Georgia.

== College career ==
As a true freshman at Georgia in 2022, Everette played in 14 games and had 13 tackles. As a sophomore in 2023, he became a starter. He had one interception and five passes defended in the 2023 season. He was named MVP of the 2024 SEC Championship Game after recording two interceptions. In 2025, he was named First-team All-SEC.

== Professional career ==
Pre-draft measurables
Height	Weight	Arm length	Hand span	Wingspan	40-yard dash	10-yard split	20-yard split	Vertical jump	Broad jump
6 ft 1 1/4 in (1.86 m)	196 lb (89 kg)	31 7/8 in (0.81 m)	9 5/8 in (0.24 m)	6 ft 5 5/8 in (1.97 m)	4.38 s	1.54 s	2.56 s	37.5 in (0.95 m)	10 ft 4 in (3.15 m)
All values from NFL Combine

Everette was drafted by the Pittsburgh Steelers in the third round with the 85th overall pick in the 2026 NFL draft.

On September 13 against the Atlanta Falcons, he recorded one solo tackle. He made his first NFL start on October 11, 2026. In Week 6, on October 18, 2026, Everette recorded his first NFL interception, off Tampa Bay Buccaneers quarterback Jalon Daniels.

== Personal life ==
His older brother, Donovan, played college football for Elon and Mercyhurst.

== Career statistics ==
=== NFL ===
Year	Team	Games		Tackles						Interceptions				Fumbles			
Year	Team	GP	GS	Cmb	Solo	Ast	Sck	TFL	QBH	Int	Yds	TD	PD	FF	FR	Yds	TD
2026	PIT	9	1	20	14	6	0.0	0	0	1	0	0	5	1	1	0	0
Career		9	1	20	14	6	0.0	0	0	1	0	0	5	1	1	0	0

=== College ===
Legend
	CFP national champion
**Bold**	Career high

Year	Team	GP	Tackles					Interceptions					Fumbles		
Year	Team	GP	Solo	Ast	Cmb	TFL	Sck	Int	Yds	Avg	TD	PD	FR	FF	TD
2022	Georgia	14	10	3	13	0.0	0.0	0	0	—	0	1	0	0	0
2023	Georgia	14	23	6	29	**3.0**	0.0	1	0	0.0	0	5	0	0	0
2024	Georgia	14	**45**	13	**58**	2.0	**1.0**	**3**	2	0.7	0	3	**1**	**2**	0
2025	Georgia	13	29	**21**	50	0.0	0.0	1	**30**	**30.0**	0	**10**	**1**	0	**1**
Career		55	107	43	150	5.0	1.0	5	32	6.4	0	19	2	2	1
