= Pete Golding =

American football coach (born 1984)

Current position
- Title: Head coach
- Team: Ole Miss
- Conference: SEC
- Record: 9–5

Biographical details
- Born: February 8, 1984 (age 42); Hammond, Louisiana, U.S.

Playing career
- 2002–2005: Delta State
- Position: Safety

Coaching career (HC unless noted)
- 2006: Delta State (GA)
- 2007–2009: Tusculum (DC/DB)
- 2010–2011: Delta State (DC/DB)
- 2012–2013: Southeastern Louisiana (DC)
- 2014–2015: Southern Miss (DB)
- 2016–2017: UTSA (DC/CB)
- 2018–2022: Alabama (DC/ILB)
- 2023–2025: Ole Miss (DC/ILB)
- 2025–present: Ole Miss

Head coaching record
- Overall: 9–5
- Bowls: 2–1
- Tournaments: 2–1 (CFP)

Stephen Thomas "Pete" Golding (born February 8, 1984) is an American football coach who is currently the head football coach at the University of Mississippi (Ole Miss). He previously served as the defensive coordinator and the inside linebackers coach at Ole Miss from 2023 to 2025. Golding was also an assistant coach at the University of Alabama, University of Texas at San Antonio, University of Southern Mississippi, Southeastern Louisiana University, Delta State University, and Tusculum University.

== Playing career ==
Golding was a four-year starter for the Delta State Statesmen from 2002 to 2005 at safety, racking up 285 career tackles to rank third in school history while recording nine career interceptions to finish fourth. In 2004, the free safety garnered All-Gulf South Conference honors after leading the team with 85 tackles with two interceptions and eight pass break-ups. As a senior in 2005, he tallied 81 tackles with five tackles-for-loss, two interceptions and two forced fumbles.

== Coaching career ==
Golding began his coaching career as a graduate assistant on former Delta State head coach Rick Rhoades' staff in 2006.

=== Tusculum ===
Golding served for two years as defensive coordinator and defensive backs coach under Frankie DeBusk at Tusculum College.

=== Delta State ===
Golding returned to Delta State in 2010. The Statesmen advanced to the NCAA DII National Championship game and their third Gulf South Conference title in four years. They finished the season with an 11–4 overall record and a 6–2 mark in the GSC.

=== Southeastern Louisiana ===
The Hammond, Louisiana, native spent two seasons as Southeastern Louisiana’s defensive coordinator. In his final year in 2013, the Lions won 11 games, as well as their first Southland Conference title since 1961.

=== Southern Miss ===
The Golden Eagles posted a six-win improvement in his second season. Southern Miss finished 9–5 overall, won the West Division of Conference USA with a 7–1 mark and made an appearance in the Heart of Dallas Bowl in 2015.

=== UTSA ===
Golding was hired by Frank Wilson and spent two seasons with the Roadrunners. Golding's 2017 defense ranked seventh in the Football Bowl Subdivision, allowing 287.8 yards per game.

=== Alabama ===
University of Alabama head coach Nick Saban announced the hiring of Pete Golding on December 15, 2017, to serve as a defensive assistant for the Crimson Tide in 2018. Golding was traveling with the Crimson Tide for the College Football Playoff. For the 2018 season Golding was the co-defensive coordinator/inside linebackers coach for the Tide.

He was promoted to defensive coordinator in February 2019. However he struggled during the 2019 season.

In 2020, he was a part of the coaching staff during the Tide's national championship campaign.

In February 2022, Golding was arrested by police and charged with driving under the influence in Northport, Alabama,.

=== Ole Miss ===
On January 13, 2023, Ole Miss announced that Golding had been hired as the new defensive coordinator for the Rebels.

On November 30, 2025, Ole Miss promoted Golding to head coach following the departure of Lane Kiffin to LSU. On December 20, Golding led Ole Miss to defeat Tulane in the College Football Playoff First Round Game in his head coaching debut. Ole Miss went on to defeat the No. 3 Georgia Bulldogs 39–34 in the Sugar Bowl, marking the team's second win since Kiffin's departure. The Rebels lost a close game to the Miami Hurricanes in the next round.

== Head coaching record ==
=== College ===
Year	Team	Overall	Conference	Standing	Bowl/playoffs	Coaches^{#}	AP^{°}
Ole Miss Rebels (Southeastern Conference) (2025–present)
2025	Ole Miss	2–1 (Note: Head coach Lane Kiffin took the LSU head coaching job at the end of the regular season. Golding coached the postseason in Kiffin’s place.)			W CFP First Round^{†}, W Sugar^{†}, L Fiesta^{†}	3	3
2026	Ole Miss	7–4	4–4				
Ole Miss:		9–5	4–4				
Total:		9–5					
^{†}Indicates CFP / New Years' Six bowl.; ^{#}Rankings from final Coaches Poll.; ^{°}Rankings from final AP Poll.
