= Harrison Wallace III =

American football player (born 2003)

No. 83 – Arizona Cardinals
- Position: Wide receiver
- Roster status: Active

Personal information
- Born: April 23, 2003 (age 23); Montgomery, Alabama, U.S.
- Listed height: 6 ft 0 in (1.83 m)
- Listed weight: 192 lb (87 kg)

Career information
- High school: Pike Road (Pike Road, Alabama)
- College: Penn State (2021–2024); Ole Miss (2025)
- NFL draft: 2026: undrafted

Career history
- Arizona Cardinals (2026–present)

Career NFL statistics as of Week 10, 2026
- Receptions: 1
- Receiving yards: 9
- Stats at Pro Football Reference

Harrison "Tre" Wallace III (born April 23, 2003) is an American professional football wide receiver for the Arizona Cardinals of the National Football League (NFL). He played college football for the Penn State Nittany Lions and Ole Miss Rebels.

== Early life ==
Wallace III attended Pike Road High School in Pike Road, Alabama. He committed to Penn State University to play college football.

== College career ==
=== Penn State ===
As a true freshman at Penn State in 2021, Wallace III appeared in three games and redshirted. As a redshirt freshman in 2022, he played in 13 games and 19 receptions for 273 yards and one touchdown and as a redshirt sophomore in 2023 started six of eight games and had 19 receptions for 228 yards and a touchdown. He returned to Penn State as a starter his redshirt junior year in 2024.

On January 14, 2025, Wallace announced that he would enter the transfer portal.

=== Ole Miss ===
On January 19, 2025, Wallace announced that he would transfer to Ole Miss.

=== College statistics ===
| Season | Team | GP | Receiving | | | | | |
| Season | Team | GP | Rec | Yds | Avg | Lng | TD | Y/G |
|---|---|---|---|---|---|---|---|---|
| 2021 | Penn State | 0 | Redshirted (redshirt) | | | | | |
| 2022 | Penn State | 13 | 19 | 273 | 14.4 | 48 | 1 | 21.0 |
| 2023 | Penn State | 8 | 19 | 228 | 12.0 | 29 | 1 | 28.5 |
| 2024 | Penn State | 15 | 46 | 720 | 15.7 | 50 | 4 | 48.0 |
| 2025 | Ole Miss | 14 | 57 | 894 | 15.7 | 55 | 4 | 63.9 |
| Career | | 53 | 141 | 2115 | 15.0 | 55 | 10 | 39.9 |

== Professional career ==
Pre-draft measurables
| Height | Weight | Arm length | Hand span | Wingspan | 40-yard dash | 10-yard split | 20-yard split | 20-yard shuttle | Three-cone drill | Vertical jump | Broad jump |
|---|---|---|---|---|---|---|---|---|---|---|---|
| 5 ft 11 7/8 in (1.83 m) | 192 lb (87 kg) | 32 1/8 in (0.82 m) | 8 3/8 in (0.21 m) | 6 ft 4 in (1.93 m) | 4.54 s | 1.58 s | 2.65 s | 4.34 s | 7.01 s | 35.0 in (0.89 m) | 10 ft 2 in (3.10 m) |
All values from NFL Combine/Pro Day

On April 28, 2026, Wallace signed with the Arizona Cardinals as an undrafted free agent. Wallace was waived by the Cardinals as a part of final roster cuts on August 30; he was re-signed to the team's practice squad the following day. He was promoted to the active roster on November 3.
