= Cayden Lee =

American football player (born 2004)

No. 19 – Missouri Tigers
- Position: Wide receiver
- Class: Senior

Personal information
- Born: November 17, 2004 (age 21)
- Listed height: 5 ft 11 in (1.80 m)
- Listed weight: 180 lb (82 kg)

Career information
- High school: Kennesaw Mountain (Kennesaw, Georgia)
- College: Ole Miss (2023–2025); Missouri (2026–present)
- Stats at ESPN

Cayden Xavier Lee (born November 17, 2004) is an American college football wide receiver for the Missouri Tigers. He previously played for the Ole Miss Rebels.

== Early life ==
Lee attended Kennesaw Mountain High School in Kennesaw, Georgia. As a senior, he totaled 74 receptions for 1,101 yards and 13 touchdowns, before committing to play college football at the University of Mississippi.

== College career ==
In the first game of his collegiate career against Mercer, Lee hauled in a 34-yard touchdown pass from Spencer Sanders. He made his first career start in the 2023 Peach Bowl against Penn State, finishing with three catches for 29 yards. Lee finished his freshman season totaling five receptions for 114 yards and two touchdowns. His production increased during his sophomore season, catching five passes for 127 yards against Arkansas. Lee ended the 2024 season recording 57 catches for 874 yards and two touchdowns. He entered his junior season as the Rebels' leading returning receiver. Lee finished the 2025 season catching 44 passes for 635 yards and three touchdowns. On January 17, 2026, he entered the transfer portal.

=== Statistics ===
College statistics
| Season | Team | GP | Receiving | | | |
| Season | Team | GP | Rec | Yds | Avg | TD |
|---|---|---|---|---|---|---|
| 2023 | Ole Miss | 10 | 5 | 114 | 22.8 | 2 |
| 2024 | Ole Miss | 13 | 57 | 874 | 15.3 | 2 |
| 2025 | Ole Miss | 15 | 44 | 635 | 14.4 | 3 |
| Career | | 38 | 106 | 1,623 | 15.3 | 7 |
