= De'Zhaun Stribling =

American football player (born 2002)

No. 7 – San Francisco 49ers
- Position: Wide receiver
- Roster status: Injured reserve

Personal information
- Born: December 18, 2002 (age 23); Honolulu, Hawaii, U.S.
- Listed height: 6 ft 2 in (1.88 m)
- Listed weight: 207 lb (94 kg)

Career information
- High school: Kapolei (Kapolei, Hawaii)
- College: Washington State (2021–2022); Oklahoma State (2023–2024); Ole Miss (2025)
- NFL draft: 2026: 2nd round, 33rd overall pick

Career history
- San Francisco 49ers (2026–present)
- Stats at Pro Football Reference

De'Zhaun-Ryan Demetrios Stribling (born December 18, 2002) is an American professional football wide receiver for the San Francisco 49ers of the National Football League (NFL). He played college football for the Ole Miss Rebels, Washington State Cougars, and Oklahoma State Cowboys. He was selected by the 49ers in the second round of the 2026 NFL draft.

== Early life ==
Stribling was born on December 18, 2002 in the Kapolei neighborhood of Honolulu, Hawaii and lived in North Carolina, San Diego, and Florida before returning to Hawaii in the fifth grade. Stribling attended Kapolei High School in Kapolei, Hawaii. He was rated as a three-star recruit and committed to play college football for the Washington State Cougars over others schools such as Hawaii, San Diego State, and Wake Forest.

== College career ==
=== Washington State ===
As a freshman in 2021, Stribling hauled in 44 receptions for 471 yards and five touchdowns. In 2022, he notched 51 receptions for 602 yards and five touchdowns. After the season, Stribling entered his name into the NCAA transfer portal.

=== Oklahoma State ===
Stribling transferred to play for the Oklahoma State Cowboys. In Stribling's first season with the Cowboys, he played in just four games before sustaining a season-ending hand injury, where he notched 14 receptions for 198 yards and a touchdown.

On December 9, 2024, Stribling would enter the transfer portal for the second time.

=== Ole Miss ===
On December 17, 2024, Stribling announced that he would transfer to Ole Miss. Stribling tallied a career-high 55 catches in 2025 with the Rebels and compiled 811 yards and six touchdowns.

=== Statistics ===
Year	Team	GP	Offense				Defense				
Year	Team	GP	Receiving				Tackles				
Year	Team	GP	Rec	Yds	Avg	TD	Solo	Ast	Comb	TFL	Sk
2021	Washington State	13	44	471	10.7	5	1	0	1	0.0	0.0
2022	Washington State	12	51	602	11.8	5	1	0	1	0.0	0.0
2023	Oklahoma State	4	14	198	14.1	1	1	0	1	0.0	0.0
2024	Oklahoma State	12	52	882	17.0	6	0	0	1	0.0	0.0
2025	Ole Miss	15	55	811	14.7	6	3	0	3	0.0	0.0
Career		56	216	2,964	13.7	23	6	0	6	0.0	0.0

== Professional career ==
Pre-draft measurables
Height	Weight	Arm length	Hand span	Wingspan	40-yard dash	10-yard split	20-yard split	20-yard shuttle	Three-cone drill	Vertical jump	Broad jump
6 ft 2 1/8 in (1.88 m)	207 lb (94 kg)	31 5/8 in (0.80 m)	10 in (0.25 m)	6 ft 4 7/8 in (1.95 m)	4.36 s	1.53 s	2.54 s	4.36 s	6.99 s	36.0 in (0.91 m)	10 ft 7 in (3.23 m)
All values from NFL Combine/Pro Day

Stribling was selected by the San Francisco 49ers in the second round, with the 33rd overall pick, of the 2026 NFL draft. On May 8, he signed his rookie contract with the 49ers. On September 16, Stribling was placed on injured reserve due to an ankle injury suffered in the team's season–opening victory over the Los Angeles Rams. After undergoing surgery, he was ruled out for roughly 10 weeks.

== Personal life ==
Stribling is the nephew of former professional wrestler, Don Muraco.
