= Winston Watkins Jr. =

American football player (born 2007)

No. 6 – LSU Tigers
- Position: Wide receiver
- Class: Sophomore

Personal information
- Born: March 18, 2007 (age 19)
- Listed height: 5 ft 10 in (1.78 m)
- Listed weight: 182 lb (83 kg)

Career information
- High school: Venice (Venice, Florida)
- College: Ole Miss (2025); LSU (2026–present)
- Stats at ESPN

Winston Lance Watkins Jr. (born March 18, 2007) is an American college football wide receiver for the LSU Tigers. He previously played for the Ole Miss Rebels.

== Early life ==
Watkins attended IMG Academy in Bradenton, Florida, from his freshman year to midway through his junior year when he transferred to First Baptist Academy in Naples, Florida. For his senior year he attended Venice High School in Venice, Florida. He had 61 receptions for 1,170 yards with 13 touchdowns his junior year and 78 receptions for 1,011 yards with 17 touchdowns his senior year. Watkins was selected to play in the 2025 All-American Bowl. He originally committed to play college football at the University of Colorado Boulder before flipping to the University of Mississippi.

== College career ==
=== Ole Miss ===
Watkins earned playing time during his true freshman year at Ole Miss in 2025.

On January 9, 2026, Watkins announced that he would enter the transfer portal.

=== LSU ===
On January 11, 2026, Watkins announced that he would transfer to LSU.

== Personal life ==
His cousins, Sammy Watkins, Austin Watkins and Jaylen Watkins, played in the National Football League (NFL).
