= Dae'Quan Wright =

American football player (born 2003)

Colorado Stampede
- Position: Tight end
- Roster status: Unsigned draft pick

Personal information
- Born: September 21, 2003 (age 23)
- Listed height: 6 ft 4 in (1.93 m)
- Listed weight: 246 lb (112 kg)

Career information
- High school: Perry (Perry, Georgia)
- College: Virginia Tech (2022–2023); Ole Miss (2024–2025)
- NFL draft: 2026: undrafted

Career history
- Philadelphia Eagles (2026)*; Cleveland Browns (2026)*; Colorado Stampede (2027-present)
- * Offseason or practice squad member only

Awards and highlights
- Second-team All-SEC (2025)
- Stats at Pro Football Reference

Dae'Quan Tariq Wright (born September 21, 2003) is an American professional football tight end. He played college football for the Virginia Tech Hokies and Ole Miss Rebels.

== Early life and education ==
Wright was raised in Perry, Georgia, by his mother, Latoya Wright, and his aunt, Monica Buckles. His father succumbed to a heart attack.

Wright attended Perry High School, where his older brother, Brinton, played on the basketball team. At Perry, he was a four-year varsity letterman as a pass catcher and wildcat quarterback. He was rated as a three-star recruit and committed to play college football for the Virginia Tech Hokies. Wright is friends with Casey Hayward, a Perry native and a former NFL player, who encouraged him to pursue a football career.

== College career ==
=== Virginia Tech ===
As a freshman in 2022, Wright notched 19 receptions for 208 yards. In 2023, he became the Hokies' starting tight end midway through the season and hauled in 28 receptions for 366 yards. After the season, Wright entered his name into the NCAA transfer portal.

=== Ole Miss ===
Wright transferred to play for the Ole Miss Rebels. In week 9 of the 2024 season, he hauled in three receptions for 54 yards in a win over Oklahoma. In week 10, Wright brought in nine receptions for 99 yards and two touchdowns in a blowout win over Arkansas.

== Professional career ==
Pre-draft measurables
Height	Weight	Arm length	Hand span	Wingspan
6 ft 3 3/4 in (1.92 m)	246 lb (112 kg)	32 1/4 in (0.82 m)	9 1/4 in (0.23 m)	6 ft 6 1/2 in (1.99 m)
All values from NFL Combine

=== Philadelphia Eagles ===
After going unselected in the 2026 NFL draft, Wright signed with the Philadelphia Eagles as an undrafted free agent. He was waived by the Eagles on August 10.

=== Cleveland Browns ===
On August 11, 2026, Wright was claimed off waivers by the Cleveland Browns. The Browns released him on August 24 and he was set to sign with Louisiana State University, becoming the first player to ever go from an NFL roster back to college. On August 25, the SEC passed a rule that would ban NFL players from returning to college, which would make Wright ineligible to play for LSU. Wright was not added to LSU's roster before the start of the college football season.

On September 17, the NFL sent out a league memo stating that Wright (and Zxavian Harris) were ineligible to join any teams for the 2026 NFL season.
