= Caleb Odom (American football) =

American football player (born 2005)

No. 4 – Ole Miss Rebels
- Position: Tight end
- Class: Junior

Personal information
- Born: September 7, 2005 (age 21)
- Listed height: 6 ft 5 in (1.96 m)
- Listed weight: 245 lb (111 kg)

Career information
- High school: Carrollton (Carrollton, Georgia)
- College: Alabama (2024); Ole Miss (2025–present)
- Stats at ESPN

Derrell Caleb Odom (born September 7, 2005) is an American college football tight end for the Ole Miss Rebels. He previously played for the Alabama Crimson Tide.

== Early life ==
Odom attended Carrollton High School in Carrollton, Georgia. He recorded 64 receptions for 1,121 yards with 13 touchdowns his senior year and 46 receptions for 748 yards and 12 touchdowns his senior year. A five-star recruit by On3.com, Odom was selected to play in the Under Armour All-America Game. He committed to the University of Alabama to play college football.

== College career ==
Alabama moved Odom from tight end to wide receiver his freshman year at Alabama in 2024. He played in 12 games with one start and had seven receptions for 65 yards. After the season, Odom entered the transfer portal and committed to the University of Mississippi. Ole Miss moved him back to tight end and in first season he played in 15 games, recording 19 receptions for 197 yards and two touchdowns. Odom returned to Ole Miss for the 2026 season.
