= 2017 Florida Atlantic Owls football team =

American college football season

2017 Florida Atlantic Owls football

C-USA champion C-USA East Division champion Boca Raton Bowl champion

C-USA Championship, W 41–17 vs. North Texas

Boca Raton Bowl, W 50–3 vs. Akron
- Conference: Conference USA
- East Division
- Record: 11–3 (8–0 C-USA)
- Head coach: Lane Kiffin (1st season)
- Offensive coordinator: Kendal Briles (1st season)
- Offensive scheme: Veer and shoot
- Defensive coordinator: Chris Kiffin (1st season)
- Base defense: Multiple
- Home stadium: FAU Stadium

2017 Conference USA football standings
| | Conf. | | | Overall |
| Team | W | | L | W | | L |
|---|---|---|---|---|---|---|
East Division
| Florida Atlantic x$ | 8 | – | 0 | 11 | – | 3 |
| FIU | 5 | – | 3 | 8 | – | 5 |
| Marshall | 4 | – | 4 | 8 | – | 5 |
| Middle Tennessee | 4 | – | 4 | 7 | – | 6 |
| Western Kentucky | 4 | – | 4 | 6 | – | 7 |
| Old Dominion | 3 | – | 5 | 5 | – | 7 |
| Charlotte | 1 | – | 7 | 1 | – | 11 |
West Division
| North Texas x | 7 | – | 1 | 9 | – | 5 |
| Southern Miss | 6 | – | 2 | 8 | – | 5 |
| UAB | 6 | – | 2 | 8 | – | 5 |
| Louisiana Tech | 4 | – | 4 | 7 | – | 6 |
| UTSA | 3 | – | 5 | 6 | – | 5 |
| Rice | 1 | – | 7 | 1 | – | 11 |
| UTEP | 0 | – | 8 | 0 | – | 12 |
Championship: Florida Atlantic 41, North Texas 17
$ – Conference champion; x – Division champion/co-champions; Rankings from AP Poll

The 2017 Florida Atlantic Owls football team represented Florida Atlantic University in the 2017 NCAA Division I FBS football season. The Owls played their home games at the FAU Stadium in Boca Raton, Florida, and competed in the East Division of Conference USA (C–USA). They were led by first-year head coach Lane Kiffin. They finished the season 11–3, 8–0 in C-USA play to win the East Division title and represented the East Division in the Conference USA Championship Game where they defeated North Texas to be crowned C-USA champions. They were invited to the Boca Raton Bowl, where they defeated Akron.

== Schedule ==
Florida Atlantic announced its 2017 football schedule on January 26, 2017. The 2017 schedule consisted of six home and away games in the regular season. The Owls hosted two of the four non-conference opponents, Bethune–Cookman from the Mid-Eastern Athletic Conference and Navy from the American Athletic Conference and traveled to Buffalo of the Mid-American Conference and Wisconsin of the Big Ten Conference.

| Date | Time | Opponent | Site | TV | Result | Attendance |
|---|---|---|---|---|---|---|
| September 1 | 8:00 p.m. | Navy* | FAU Stadium; Boca Raton, FL | ESPNU | L 19–42 | 28,481 |
| September 9 | 12:00 p.m. | at No. 9 Wisconsin* | Camp Randall Stadium; Madison, WI | BTN | L 14–31 | 77,542 |
| September 16 | 8:00 p.m. | Bethune–Cookman* | FAU Stadium; Boca Raton, FL | beIN | W 45–0 | 16,743 |
| September 23 | 7:00 p.m. | at Buffalo* | University at Buffalo Stadium; Amherst, NY | ESPN3 | L 31–34 | 14,246 |
| September 30 | 7:00 p.m. | Middle Tennessee | FAU Stadium; Boca Raton, FL | Stadium | W 38–20 | 12,913 |
| October 7 | 6:00 p.m. | at Old Dominion | Foreman Field; Norfolk, VA | Stadium | W 58–28 | 20,118 |
| October 21 | 5:00 p.m. | North Texas^{†} | FAU Stadium; Boca Raton, FL | ESPN3 | W 69–31 | 13,277 |
| October 28 | 4:30 p.m. | at Western Kentucky | Houchens Industries–L. T. Smith Stadium; Bowling Green, KY | Stadium | W 42–28 | 12,441 |
| November 3 | 6:00 p.m. | Marshall | FAU Stadium; Boca Raton, FL | CBSSN | W 30–25 | 15,880 |
| November 11 | 3:30 p.m. | at Louisiana Tech | Joe Aillet Stadium; Ruston, LA | Stadium | W 48–23 | 16,511 |
| November 18 | 7:00 p.m. | FIU | FAU Stadium; Boca Raton, FL (Shula Bowl) | Stadium | W 52–24 | 24,116 |
| November 25 | 2:00 p.m. | at Charlotte | Jerry Richardson Stadium; Charlotte, NC | Stadium | W 31–12 | 8,330 |
| December 2 | 12:00 p.m. | North Texas | FAU Stadium; Boca Raton, FL (Conference USA Championship Game) | ESPN2 | W 41–17 | 14,258 |
| December 19 | 7:00 p.m. | vs. Akron* | FAU Stadium; Boca Raton, FL (Boca Raton Bowl) | ESPN | W 50–3 | 25,912 |
*Non-conference game; ^{†}Homecoming; Rankings from AP Poll released prior to the game; All times are in Eastern time

== Game summaries ==
=== Navy ===
| | 1 | 2 | 3 | 4 | Total |
|---|---|---|---|---|---|
| Midshipmen | 7 | 14 | 14 | 7 | 42 |
| Owls | 3 | 7 | 3 | 6 | 19 |

=== At Wisconsin ===
| | 1 | 2 | 3 | 4 | Total |
|---|---|---|---|---|---|
| Owls | 7 | 7 | 0 | 0 | 14 |
| No. 9 Badgers | 14 | 10 | 7 | 0 | 31 |

=== Bethune–Cookman ===
| | 1 | 2 | 3 | 4 | Total |
|---|---|---|---|---|---|
| Wildcats | 0 | 0 | 0 | 0 | 0 |
| Owls | 14 | 7 | 17 | 7 | 45 |

=== At Buffalo ===
| | 1 | 2 | 3 | 4 | Total |
|---|---|---|---|---|---|
| Owls | 7 | 10 | 0 | 14 | 31 |
| Bulls | 14 | 3 | 7 | 10 | 34 |

=== Middle Tennessee ===
| | 1 | 2 | 3 | 4 | Total |
|---|---|---|---|---|---|
| Blue Raiders | 6 | 0 | 7 | 7 | 20 |
| Owls | 14 | 10 | 0 | 14 | 38 |

=== At Old Dominion ===
| | 1 | 2 | 3 | 4 | Total |
|---|---|---|---|---|---|
| Owls | 17 | 14 | 14 | 13 | 58 |
| Monarchs | 7 | 7 | 7 | 7 | 28 |

=== North Texas ===
| | 1 | 2 | 3 | 4 | Total |
|---|---|---|---|---|---|
| Mean Green | 0 | 7 | 10 | 14 | 31 |
| Owls | 24 | 17 | 21 | 7 | 69 |

=== At WKU ===
| | 1 | 2 | 3 | 4 | Total |
|---|---|---|---|---|---|
| Owls | 10 | 10 | 0 | 22 | 42 |
| Hilltoppers | 7 | 14 | 7 | 0 | 28 |

=== Marshall ===
| | 1 | 2 | 3 | 4 | Total |
|---|---|---|---|---|---|
| Thundering Herd | 0 | 3 | 13 | 9 | 25 |
| Owls | 13 | 3 | 7 | 7 | 30 |

=== At Louisiana Tech ===
| | 1 | 2 | 3 | 4 | Total |
|---|---|---|---|---|---|
| Owls | 6 | 14 | 22 | 6 | 48 |
| Bulldogs | 3 | 6 | 7 | 7 | 23 |

=== FIU ===
| | 1 | 2 | 3 | 4 | Total |
|---|---|---|---|---|---|
| Panthers | 0 | 10 | 7 | 7 | 24 |
| Owls | 14 | 7 | 16 | 15 | 52 |

=== At Charlotte ===
| | 1 | 2 | 3 | 4 | Total |
|---|---|---|---|---|---|
| Owls | 10 | 14 | 7 | 0 | 31 |
| 49ers | 0 | 6 | 6 | 0 | 12 |

=== North Texas–C-USA Championship Game ===
| | 1 | 2 | 3 | 4 | Total |
|---|---|---|---|---|---|
| Mean Green | 0 | 0 | 9 | 8 | 17 |
| Owls | 10 | 17 | 7 | 7 | 41 |

=== Akron–Boca Raton Bowl ===
| | 1 | 2 | 3 | 4 | Total |
|---|---|---|---|---|---|
| Zips | 0 | 3 | 0 | 0 | 3 |
| Owls | 7 | 14 | 15 | 14 | 50 |

== Roster ==
2017 Florida Atlantic Owls football team roster
Players
Coaches
Offense

| Pos. | # | Name | Class |
|---|---|---|---|
| WR | 1 | Henry Bussey III | Sr |
| QB | 2 | Chris Robison | Fr |
| WR | 4 | Kalib Woods | RSr |
| RB | 5 | Devin Singletary | So |
| RB | 6 | Kerrith Whyte Jr. | RSo |
| WR | 8 | Bobby Mitchell | RJr |
| RB | 9 | Gregory Howell Jr. | Sr |
| TE | 10 | Dustin Bowens | RJr |
| WR | 11 | D'Anfernee McGriff | So |
| WR | 12 | John Franklin III | GS |
| QB | 13 | Daniel Parr | RSo |
| QB | 14 | De'Andre Johnson | RSo |
| WR | 15 | Kamrin Solomon | Sr |
| QB | 16 | Jason Driskel | RJr |
| QB | 18 | Conor Miller | RJr |
| WR | 19 | DeAndre McNeal | Jr |
| RB | 20 | Marcus Clark | RSr |
| RB | 22 | Tyrek Tisdale | Fr |
| TE | 25 | Chase Lasater | Fr |
| RB | 27 | Daniel Leconte | Fr |
| WR | 28 | James Brunson | RSo |
| RB | 28 | James Charles | RFr |
| TE | 30 | John Raine | So |
| RB | 34 | Gerald Hearns | RJr |
| TE | 40 | Harrison Bryant | So |
| RB | 43 | AJ Turman | RSr |
| TE | 43 | Ray Wilson Jr. | Jr |
| TE | 44 | Jacob Wilson | RJr |
| TE | 47 | Logan Peterson | Fr |
| OL | 51 | Ean Biancardi | RFr |
| OL | 52 | Jared Nourse | RFr |
| OL | 53 | Jakobi Smith | RSr |
| OL | 55 | Matt Murphy | RJr |
| OL | 58 | Reggie Bain | RJr |
| OL | 59 | Julius Iannella | Fr |
| OL | 60 | BJ Etienne | Fr |
| OL | 62 | Bryan Beck | RSo |
| OL | 63 | Nick Weber | Fr |
| OL | 64 | Antonyo Woods | RSr |
| OL | 65 | Tarrick Thomas | RSo |
| OL | 66 | Will Tuihalamaka | RSo |
| OL | 71 | Jake Jones | RFr |
| OL | 73 | Brandon Walton | So |
| OL | 74 | Deon Humphrey | Fr |
| OL | 75 | Jack Breshears | RSo |
| OL | 76 | Robert Hawkins | Fr |
| OL | 77 | Roman Fernandez | RSr |
| OL | 78 | Richard Williams | RSo |
| OL | 79 | Josh Kendall | RJr |
| WR | 80 | Nate Terry | Sr |
| WR | 81 | Jordan Merrell | Fr |
| WR | 82 | Tavaris Harrison | RSo |
| WR | 83 | Denzel Houston | Fr |
| WR | 84 | Ladante Harris | RSo |
| WR | 85 | John Mitchell | So |
| WR | 86 | Willie Wright | Fr |
| WR | 87 | Dante Cousart | RSo |
| WR | 88 | Dominic Milanese | So |
| WR | 89 | Ronald Patterson | Fr |

Defense

| Pos. | # | Name | Class |
|---|---|---|---|
| LB | 2 | Azeez Al-Shaair | Jr |
| CB | 3 | Shelton Lewis | Jr |
| S | 4 | Ocie Rose | Jr |
| S | 5 | Ahman Ross | Fr |
| LB | 7 | Rashad Smith | So |
| DL | 8 | Nick Internicola | RSr |
| DT | 11 | Ray Ellis | RJr |
| DB | 12 | Diashun Moss | Fr |
| DE | 13 | Leighton McCarthy | So |
| DB | 14 | Andrew Soroh | RJr |
| S | 15 | Savion Harris | Jr |
| LB | 16 | Bradley Clement | So |
| CB | 17 | Tyrone Smith Jr. | Fr |
| S | 18 | Jalen Young | Jr |
| DB | 19 | Jake Stoshak | GS |
| DB | 20 | Malik Vigille | Jr |
| CB | 21 | Torrin Davis | So |
| DB | 21 | Herb Miller | Jr |
| CB | 22 | Dasean Cannon | Jr |
| DB | 23 | Raekwon Williams | Sr |
| DB | 24 | Zyon Gilbert | Fr |
| S | 25 | Quran Hafiz | Fr |
| CB | 26 | Chris Tooley | So |
| S | 27 | Da'Von Brown | So |
| DB | 28 | Khamal Ellison | Fr |
| CB | 29 | Korel Smith | RFr |
| S | 30 | Abdias Corgelas | Sr |
| LB | 31 | Kris Harris | RJr |
| LB | 32 | Jesse Howanitz | RFr |
| DE | 33 | David Belvin III | So |
| LB | 34 | Kain Daub | RJr |
| S | 35 | Jordan Helm | RFr |
| LB | 36 | Akileis Leroy | Fr |
| S | 37 | James Pierre | Fr |
| S | 38 | Silver Saunders | Jr |
| LB | 39 | Cameron Syblis | RFr |
| LB | 41 | Joe Pohiva | Jr |
| DT | 42 | William Davis | So |
| DE | 45 | Tim Bonner | RSo |
| LB | 46 | Jacob Douglas | Jr |
| DT | 48 | Kevin McCrary | So |
| LB | 49 | Khantrell Burden | Jr |
| DL | 50 | Romello Martin | Fr |
| LB | 54 | Hosea Barnwell V | So |
| DE | 55 | Damian Horton | Jr |
| DL | 56 | Steven Leggett | Jr |
| DL | 90 | Collin Dell | Jr |
| DL | 90 | Chase Hooper | Fr |
| DL | 91 | Jacoby Blackmon | RJr |
| DT | 92 | Jeremiah Taleni | GS |
| DL | 94 | Hunter Snyder | RJr |
| DE | 95 | Ernest Bagner | Jr |
| DT | 96 | DaiKwon Fuse | RJr |
| DL | 97 | Anthony Bennett | RSo |
| DL | 98 | Haiden Nagel | GS |

Special teams

| Pos. | # | Name | Class |
|---|---|---|---|
| K | 17 | Greg Joseph | GS |
| K | 44 | Vladmir Rivas | Fr |
| LS | 57 | Casey Winner | Jr |
| LS | 93 | John Clancy Jr. | RSo |
| P | 99 | Ryan Rickel | GS |

Head coach

- Lane Kiffin

Coordinators/assistant coaches

- Danielle Lyons – Administrative Assistant
- Kendal Briles – Assistant Head Coach/OC/QB
- Chris Kiffin – Co-Defensive Coordinator/LB
- Corey Batoon – Safeties/Special Teams Coordinator/Co-Defensive Coordinator
- Eric Mathies – Assistant Coach/DL/Recruiting Coordinator
- Gary Harrell – Assistant Coach/WR
- Keynodo Hudson – Assistant Coach/CB
- Garin Justice – Assistant Coach/OL
- Kevin Smith – Assistant Coach/RB
- Clint Trickett – Assistant Coach/TE
- Wilson Love – Head Strength Coach for Football
- Connor Neighbors – Assistant Football Strength & Conditioning Coach
- Heather Henderson – Dir. Football Operations
- Clayton Leach – Director of Video
- C.J. Johnson – Defensive Graduate Assistant
- Mike Nysewander – Offensive GA/Special Teams
- Rip Rowan – Defensive Graduate Assistant
- Chris Rutledge – Graduate Assistant (Offense)
- DJ McCarthy – Director of Player Development
- Landan Salem – Director of Player Personnel & Pro Liaison
- JJ Daugherty – Assistant Recruiting Coordinator
- Monte Kiffin – Defensive Analyst/Pro Liaison
- Jaron Fairman – Player Development Assistant
- Davis Merritt – Player Development Assistant
- Chris Perkins – Player Development Assistant
- Michael Anthony – Offensive Analyst
- Mark Cala – Offensive Analyst
- Bradley Bramblett – Volunteer

Legend

- (C) Team captain
- (S) Suspended
- (I) Ineligible
- Injured
- Redshirt

Roster
