= 2026 LSU Tigers football team =

American college football season

2026 LSU Tigers football
- Conference: Southeastern Conference

Ranking
- AP: No. 24
- Record: 6–5 (3–5 SEC)
- Head coach: Lane Kiffin (1st season)
- Offensive coordinator: Charlie Weis Jr. (1st season)
- Co-offensive coordinator: Joe Cox (1st season)
- Offensive scheme: Veer and shoot
- Defensive coordinator: Blake Baker (3rd season)
- Co-defensive coordinator: Chris Kiffin (1st season)
- Base defense: 4–3
- Home stadium: Tiger Stadium

Uniform
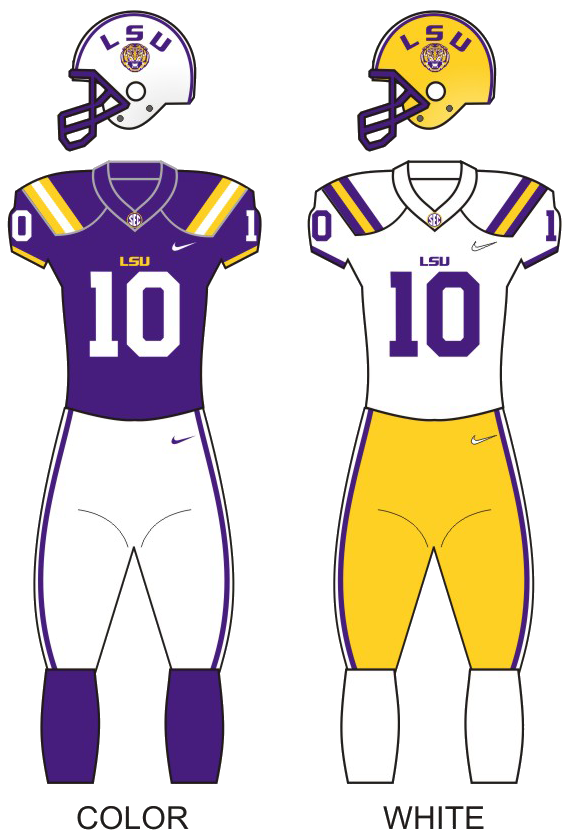

2026 Southeastern Conference football standings
| | Conf. | | | Overall |
| Team | W | | L | W | | L |
|---|---|---|---|---|---|---|
| No. 1 Georgia y | 8 | – | 1 | 10 | – | 1 |
| No. 5 Texas | 6 | – | 2 | 9 | – | 2 |
| No. 9 Tennessee | 6 | – | 2 | 9 | – | 2 |
| No. 3 Alabama | 6 | – | 2 | 9 | – | 2 |
| No. 22 Oklahoma | 5 | – | 3 | 7 | – | 4 |
| No. 24 Florida | 5 | – | 4 | 7 | – | 4 |
| No. 16 Kentucky | 5 | – | 4 | 7 | – | 4 |
| No. 25 Ole Miss | 4 | – | 4 | 7 | – | 4 |
| Auburn | 4 | – | 4 | 7 | – | 4 |
| Missouri | 4 | – | 4 | 7 | – | 4 |
| No. 21 South Carolina | 4 | – | 5 | 6 | – | 5 |
| LSU | 3 | – | 5 | 6 | – | 5 |
| Mississippi State | 2 | – | 6 | 5 | – | 6 |
| Arkansas | 2 | – | 6 | 4 | – | 7 |
| Texas A&M | 1 | – | 7 | 4 | – | 7 |
| Vanderbilt | 1 | – | 7 | 4 | – | 7 |
Championship: Georgia vs TBD
^ – College Football Playoff participant; $ – Conference champion; y – Championship game participant; As of November 22, 2026; Rankings from CFP rankings

The 2026 LSU Tigers football team is who represents Louisiana State University (LSU) as they are a member of the Southeastern Conference (SEC) during the 2026 NCAA Division I FBS football season. Led by first-year head coach Lane Kiffin, the Tigers play their home games at Tiger Stadium located in Baton Rouge, Louisiana.

In week 8, LSU traveled to face Auburn, where they defeated the Tigers 38-17, making this the first conference road win since 2024, where defeated Arkansas 34-10. following week 8 LSU defeated Mississippi State 31-0, making this the first time LSU had shutout a conference opponent since 2007, the season LSU won the National Championship.

For the first time since 2019, LSU—Alabama game, will be playing at 2:30, however this is the first time they play in that time slot in Baton Rouge since 2010, that is the season LSU defeated Alabama 24-21.

== Schedule ==
| Date | Time | Opponent | Rank | Site | TV | Result | Attendance |
|---|---|---|---|---|---|---|---|
| September 5 | 6:30 p.m. | Clemson* | No. 11 | Tiger Stadium; Baton Rouge, LA (College GameDay) | ABC | W 51–10 | 102,321 |
| September 12 | 6:30 p.m. | Louisiana Tech* | No. 8 | Tiger Stadium; Baton Rouge, LA | SECN+ | W 45–14 | 102,321 |
| September 19 | 6:30 p.m. | at No. 8 Ole Miss | No. 7 | Vaught–Hemingway Stadium; Oxford, MS (Magnolia Bowl, College GameDay) | ABC | L 24–32 | 70,033 |
| September 26 | 6:30 p.m. | No. 23 Texas A&M | No. 10 | Tiger Stadium; Baton Rouge, LA (rivalry) | ABC | W 35–6 | 102,321 |
| October 3 | 6:45 p.m. | McNeese* | No. 11 | Tiger Stadium; Baton Rouge, LA | SECN | W 63–14 | 102,321 |
| October 10 | 6:00 p.m. | at Kentucky | No. 10 | Kroger Field; Lexington, KY | ESPN | L 34–35 ^{OT} | 61,897 |
| October 17 | 11:00 a.m. | No. 16 Mississippi State | No. 22 | Tiger Stadium; Baton Rouge, LA (rivalry) | ESPN | W 31–0 | 102,321 |
| October 24 | 11:00 a.m. | at Auburn | No. 18 | Jordan–Hare Stadium; Auburn, AL (Tiger Bowl SEC Nation) | ABC | W 38–17 | 88,043 |
| November 7 | 2:30 p.m. | No. 5 Alabama | No. 14 | Tiger Stadium; Baton Rouge, LA (rivalry) | ABC | L 13–31 | 102,321 |
| November 14 | 6:30 p.m. | No. 6 Texas | No. 21 | Tiger Stadium; Baton Rouge, LA | ABC | L 21–22 | 102,321 |
| November 21 | 2:30 p.m. | at No. 9 Tennessee | | Neyland Stadium; Knoxville, TN | ABC | L 13–27 | 101,915 |
| November 28 | 11:45 a.m. | at Arkansas | | Donald W. Reynolds Razorback Stadium; Fayetteville, AR (Battle for the Golden Boot) | SECN | | |
*Non-conference game; Rankings from AP Poll (and CFP Rankings, after November 3) - Released prior to game; All times are in Central time

== Rankings ==
Ranking movements Legend: ██ Increase in ranking ██ Decrease in ranking — = Not ranked RV = Received votes ( ) = First-place votes
| | Week | | | | | | | | | | | | | | | |
| Poll | Pre | 1 | 2 | 3 | 4 | 5 | 6 | 7 | 8 | 9 | 10 | 11 | 12 | 13 | 14 | Final |
|---|---|---|---|---|---|---|---|---|---|---|---|---|---|---|---|---|
| AP | 11 | 8 | 7 (1) | 10 | 11 | 10 | 22 | 18 | 15 | 15 | 24 | RV | | | | |
| Coaches | 13 | 8 | 7 (1) | 11 | 11 | 10 | 21 | 17 | 13 | 15 | 22 | 23 | RV | | | |
| CFP | Not released | | | | | | | | | 14 | 21 | — | | | | Not released |

== Game summaries ==
=== vs Clemson ===
Clemson Tigers (0–0) at No. 11 LSU Tigers (0–0) – Game summary

| Quarter | 1 | 2 | 3 | 4 | Total |
|---|---|---|---|---|---|
| Clemson | 3 | 0 | 0 | 7 | 10 |
| No. 11 LSU | 17 | 14 | 13 | 7 | 51 |

at Tiger Stadium • Baton Rouge, Louisiana

- Date: September 5
- Game time: 6:30 p.m.
- Game weather: Cloudy • Temperature: 78 °F (26 °C) • Wind: NW at 3 mph
- Game attendance: 102,321
- Referee: Jerry Magallanes
- TV announcers (ABC): Chris Fowler (play-by-play), Kirk Herbstreit (analyst), Holly Rowe and Laura Rutledge (sideline reporters)

Game information

First quarter

- CLEM – Nolan Hauser 49-yard field goal, 13:28. Clemson 3–0. Drive: 4 plays, 2 yards, 1:02.
- LSU – Scott Starzyk 49-yard field goal, 10:16. Tied 3–3. Drive: 10 plays, 59 yards, 3:06.
- LSU – Dilin Jones 1-yard run (Scott Starzyk kick), 3:36. LSU 10–3. Drive: 12 plays, 89 yards, 4:21.
- LSU – Jordan Ross 30-yard interception return (Scott Starzyk kick), 2:07. LSU 17–3.

Second quarter

- LSU – Sam Leavitt 8-yard run (Scott Starzyk kick), 7:54. LSU 24–3. Drive: 9 plays, 72 yards, 3:35.
- LSU – Sam Leavitt 13-yard run (Scott Starzyk kick), 1:10. LSU 31–3. Drive: 8 plays, 51 yards, 1:36.

Third quarter

- LSU – Winston Watkins Jr. 32-yard pass from Sam Leavitt (Scott Starzyk kick), 8:21. LSU 38–3. Drive: 9 plays, 69 yards, 4:13.
- LSU – Dilin Jones 12-yard run (pass failed), 3:24. LSU 44–3. Drive: 6 plays, 66 yards, 2:05.

Fourth quarter

- LSU – Phillip Wright III 30-yard pass from Landen Clark (Scott Starzyk kick), 6:43. LSU 51–3. Drive: 6 plays, 45 yards, 2:21.
- CLEM – David Eziomume 11-yard run (Nolan Hauser kick), 3:13. LSU 51–10. Drive: 8 plays, 71 yards, 3:25.

| Statistics | CLEM | LSU |
|---|---|---|
| First downs | 8 | 38 |
| Plays–yards | 48–145 | 94–644 |
| Rushes–yards | 26–40 | 58–309 |
| Passing yards | 105 | 335 |
| Passing: comp–att–int | 14–22–1 | 22–36–1 |
| Turnovers | 1 | 1 |
| Time of possession | 23:51 | 36:09 |

| Team | Category | Player | Statistics |
|---|---|---|---|
| Clemson | Passing | Christopher Vizzina | 10/16, 83 yards, INT |
| Clemson | Rushing | Jarvis Green | 4 carries, 21 yards |
| Clemson | Receiving | T. J. Moore | 4 receptions, 31 yards |
| LSU | Passing | Sam Leavitt | 16/28, 230 yards, TD, INT |
| LSU | Rushing | Sam Leavitt | 12 carries, 113 yards, 2 TD |
| LSU | Receiving | Winston Watkins Jr. | 7 receptions, 110 yards, TD |

=== vs Louisiana Tech ===
Louisiana Tech Bulldogs (1–0) at No. 8 LSU Tigers (1–0) – Game summary

| Quarter | 1 | 2 | 3 | 4 | Total |
|---|---|---|---|---|---|
| Bulldogs | 0 | 7 | 0 | 7 | 14 |
| No. 8 Tigers | 10 | 0 | 14 | 21 | 45 |

at Tiger Stadium • Baton Rouge, Louisiana

- Date: September 12
- Game time: 6:30 p.m.
- Game weather: Cloudy • Temperature: 87 °F (31 °C) • Wind: SW at 7 mph
- Game attendance: 102,321
- Referee: James Carter
- TV announcers (SECN+): Clay Matvick (play-by-play), Rocky Boiman (analyst), and Laura Stickells (sideline reporter)

Game information

First quarter

- LSU – Scott Starzyk 29-yard field goal, 6:36. Tigers 3–0. Drive: 11 plays, 52 yards, 5:01.
- LSU – Sam Leavitt 5-yard run (Scott Starzyk kick), 3:46. Tigers 10–0. Drive: 3 plays, 44 yards, 1:11.

Second quarter

- LT – Jordan McRae 100-yard interception return (Kaegan Kent kick), 1:53. Tigers 10–7.

Third quarter

- LSU – Scott Starzyk 25-yard field goal, 10:12. Tigers 13–7. Drive: 6 plays, 46 yards, 2:57.
- LSU – Sam Leavitt 9-yard run (Sam Leavitt–Malachi Thomas pass), 4:32. Tigers 21–7. Drive: 6 plays, 60 yards, 2:20.
- LSU – Scott Starzyk 23-yard field goal, 2:12. Tigers 24–7. Drive: 4 plays, 6 yards, 1:33.

Fourth quarter

- LSU – Sam Leavitt 5-yard run (Scott Starzyk kick), 13:32. Tigers 31–7. Drive: 5 plays, 73 yards, 1:40.
- LSU – Trey'Dez Green 10-yard pass from Sam Leavitt (Scott Starzyk kick), 9:39. Tigers 38–7. Drive: 6 plays, 20 yards, 2:02.
- LT – Jalen Mickens 67-yard pass from Blake Baker (Kaegan Kent kick), 8:08. Tigers 38–14. Drive: 3 plays, 68 yards, 1:23.
- LSU – Landen Clark 7-yard run (Scott Starzyk kick), 1:48. Tigers 45–14. Drive: 7 plays, 45 yards, 2:32.

| Statistics | LT | LSU |
|---|---|---|
| First downs | 8 | 26 |
| Plays–yards | 55–140 | 85–528 |
| Rushes–yards | 31–(-3) | 44–147 |
| Passing yards | 143 | 381 |
| Passing: comp–att–int | 14–24–1 | 27–41–3 |
| Turnovers | 3 | 4 |
| Time of possession | 25:51 | 34:09 |

| Team | Category | Player | Statistics |
|---|---|---|---|
| Louisiana Tech | Passing | Blake Baker | 11/21, 128 yards, TD, INT |
| Louisiana Tech | Rushing | Andrew Burnette | 6 carries, 16 yards |
| Louisiana Tech | Receiving | Jalen Mickens | 6 receptions, 101 yards, TD |
| LSU | Passing | Sam Leavitt | 25/38, 344 yards, TD, 3 INT |
| LSU | Rushing | Dilin Jones | 18 carries, 66 yards |
| LSU | Receiving | Trey'Dez Green | 6 receptions, 104 yards, TD |

=== at No. 8 Ole Miss (Magnolia Bowl) ===
After Lane Kiffin's departure from Ole Miss to LSU in 2025, college football fans eagerly awaited Kiffin's return to Ole Miss and Oxford, Mississippi. Both LSU and Ole Miss came into the week 3 matchup with a 2-0 record, with LSU and Ole Miss ranked #7 and #8 in the AP poll, respectively. College GameDay announced they would be attending the game in Oxford. According to law enforcement sources, horseback police units from New Orleans and Jackson, Mississippi were brought in to Oxford for security, crowd control and fan management. In the leadup to the game, Kiffin said in a press conference: "I told the players today, you don't have anything to worry about as far as like attention on you all week. There's just going to be so much attention, hatred, everything on me, I said, 'You just get to go play, I said really the pressure's on [Ole Miss]". In the game, Ole Miss went up 17–0 and led 24–7 at halftime. They did not score at all in the 3rd quarter as LSU cut the deficit to 24–21 and eventually tied the game at 24 a piece early in the 4th quarter. Ole Miss took the lead for good with 6:14 to go thanks to a 14-yard rushing touchdown from Trinidad Chambliss and a 2-point run from JT Lindsey. LSU ended up getting the ball back and eventually got all the way to the red zone in Ole Miss territory but could not score as Sam Leavitt threw an interception with 59 seconds left. Ole Miss won the game 32–24.

No. 7 LSU Tigers (2–0) at No. 8 Ole Miss Rebels (2–0) – Game summary

| Quarter | 1 | 2 | 3 | 4 | Total |
|---|---|---|---|---|---|
| No. 7 Tigers | 0 | 7 | 14 | 3 | 24 |
| No. 8 Rebels | 10 | 14 | 0 | 8 | 32 |

at Vaught–Hemingway Stadium • Oxford, Mississippi

- Date: September 19
- Game time: 6:49 p.m. CDT
- Game weather: Sunny • Temperature: 92 °F (33 °C) • Wind: SE at 6 miles per hour (9.7 km/h)
- Game attendance: 70,033
- Referee: David Smith
- TV announcers (ABC): Chris Fowler (play-by-play), Kirk Herbstreit (analyst), Holly Rowe, and Laura Rutledge (sideline reporters)
- Report: Official report

| Statistics | LSU | MISS |
|---|---|---|
| First downs | 19 | 25 |
| Plays–yards | 70–330 | 73–426 |
| Rushes–yards | 43–172 | 25–63 |
| Passing yards | 158 | 363 |
| Passing: comp–att–int | 16–27–1 | 33–48–1 |
| Time of possession | 30:15 | 29:45 |

| Team | Category | Player | Statistics |
|---|---|---|---|
| LSU | Passing | Sam Leavitt | 16/27, 158 yards, TD, INT |
| LSU | Rushing | Dilin Jones | 23 carries, 106 yards, TD |
| LSU | Receiving | Trey'Dez Green | 4 receptions, 60 yards |
| Ole Miss | Passing | Trinidad Chambliss | 33/48, 363 yards, 2 TD, INT |
| Ole Miss | Rushing | Kewan Lacy | 9 carries, 43 yards, TD |
| Ole Miss | Receiving | Traylon Ray | 7 receptions, 115 yards, TD |

=== vs No. 23 Texas A&M (rivalry) ===
No. 23 Texas A&M Aggies (2–1) at No. 10 LSU Tigers (2–1) – Game summary

| Quarter | 1 | 2 | 3 | 4 | Total |
|---|---|---|---|---|---|
| No. 23 Aggies | 0 | 3 | 3 | 0 | 6 |
| No. 10 Tigers | 7 | 7 | 21 | 0 | 35 |

at Tiger Stadium • Baton Rouge, Louisiana

- Date: September 26
- Game time: 6:30 p.m.
- Game weather: Cloudy • Temperature: 87 °F (31 °C) • Wind: SE at 2 miles per hour (3.2 km/h)
- Game attendance: 102,321
- Referee: Jason Autrey
- TV announcers (ABC): Joe Tessitore (play-by-play), Jesse Palmer (analyst), and Kris Budden (sideline reporter)

Game information

First quarter
Second quarter
Third quarter
Fourth quarter

| Statistics | TAMU | LSU |
|---|---|---|
| First downs | 11 | 20 |
| Plays–yards | 60–197 | 66–506 |
| Rushes–yards | 33–91 | 38–194 |
| Passing yards | 106 | 312 |
| Passing: comp–att–int | 10–27–2 | 17–28–1 |
| Turnovers | 2 | 1 |
| Time of possession | 29:39 | 30:21 |

| Team | Category | Player | Statistics |
|---|---|---|---|
| Texas A&M | Passing | Marcel Reed | 10/26, 106 yards, INT |
| Texas A&M | Rushing | Rueben Owens II | 11 carries, 62 yards |
| Texas A&M | Receiving | Isaiah Horton | 3 receptions, 43 yards |
| LSU | Passing | Sam Leavitt | 17/23, 312 yards, 2 TD, INT |
| LSU | Rushing | Dilin Jones | 14 carries, 63 yards, TD |
| LSU | Receiving | Jackson Harris | 6 receptions, 163 yards, 2 TD |

=== vs McNeese (FCS) ===
McNeese Cowboys (FCS) (2–3) at No. 11 LSU Tigers (3–1) – Game summary

| Quarter | 1 | 2 | 3 | 4 | Total |
|---|---|---|---|---|---|
| Cowboys (FCS) | 0 | 0 | 14 | 0 | 14 |
| No. 11 Tigers | 14 | 21 | 14 | 14 | 63 |

at Tiger Stadium • Baton Rouge, Louisiana

- Date: October 3
- Game time: 6:45 p.m. CDT
- Game weather: Cloudy • Temperature: 81 °F (27 °C) • Wind: E at 8 miles per hour (13 km/h)
- Game attendance: 102,321
- Referee: Kyle Olson
- TV announcers (SECN): Dave Neal (play-by-play), Cole Cubelic (analyst), and Tori Petry (sideline reporter)

Game information

First quarter

- (9:23) - LSU - Dilin Jones 1-yard run (Scott Starzyk kick) (Drive: 9 plays, 48 yards, 3:04); Tigers 7-0
- (3:18) - LSU - Roman Mothershed 1-yard pass from Sam Leavitt (Scott Starzyk kick) (Drive: 12 plays, 77 yards, 4:48); Tigers 14-0

Second quarter

- (7:37) - LSU - Landen Clark 3-yard run (Scott Starzyk kick) (Drive: 10 plays, 47 yards, 4:11); Tigers 21-0
- (4:01) - LSU - Corey Barber Jr. 6-yard pass from Sam Leavitt (Scott Starzyk kick) (Drive: 7 plays, 65 yards, 2:37); Tigers 28-0
- (0:57) - LSU - Corey Barber Jr. 12-yard pass from Sam Leavitt (Scott Starzyk kick) (Drive: 4 plays, 62 yards, 1:37); Tigers 35-0

Third quarter

- (11:34) - LSU - Deuce Geralds 1-yard run (Scott Starzyk kick) (Drive: 10 plays, 81 yards, 3:19); Tigers 42-0
- (8:22) - LSU - Harlem Berry 11-yard run (Scott Starzyk kick) (Drive: 4 plays, 64 yards, 1:20); Tigers 49-0
- (4:48) - MCN - Jamaal Levi 43-yard pass from Brady Barrier (Deaglan Cameron kick) (Drive: 1 play, 43 yards, 0:10); Tigers 49-7
- (3:32) - MCN - Jamaal Levi 64-yard run (Deaglan Cameron kick) (Drive: 2 plays, 67 yards, 0:48); Tigers 49-14

Fourth quarter

- (13:56) - LSU - Stacy Gage 46-yard run (Scott Starzyk kick) (Drive: 4 plays, 70 yards, 1:04); Tigers 56-14
- (10:55) - LSU - Stacy Gage 39-yard run (Scott Starzyk kick) (Drive: 4 plays, 72 yards, 1:09); Tigers 63-14

| Statistics | MCN | LSU |
|---|---|---|
| First downs | 6 | 39 |
| Plays–yards | 47–196 | 101–731 |
| Rushes–yards | 30–102 | 53–366 |
| Passing yards | 94 | 365 |
| Passing: comp–att–int | 8–17–1 | 31–48–1 |
| Turnovers | 1 | 1 |
| Time of possession | 22:47 | 37:13 |

| Team | Category | Player | Statistics |
|---|---|---|---|
| McNeese | Passing | Brady Barrier | 5/7, 74 yards, TD |
| McNeese | Rushing | Jamaal Levi | 1 carry, 64 yards, TD |
| McNeese | Receiving | Jamaal Levi | 2 receptions, 46 yards, TD |
| LSU | Passing | Sam Leavitt | 18/23, 177 yards, 3 TD, INT |
| LSU | Rushing | Harlem Berry | 15 carries, 125 yards, TD |
| LSU | Receiving | Corey Barber Jr. | 7 receptions, 83 yards, 2 TD |

=== at Kentucky ===
No. 10 LSU Tigers (4–1) at Kentucky Wildcats (4–1) – Game summary

| Quarter | 1 | 2 | 3 | 4 | OT | Total |
|---|---|---|---|---|---|---|
| No. 10 Tigers | 10 | 7 | 3 | 7 | 7 | 34 |
| Wildcats | 7 | 14 | 0 | 6 | 8 | 35 |

at Kroger Field • Lexington, Kentucky

- Date: October 10
- Game time: 7 p.m. EDT
- Game weather: Cloudy • Temperature: 60 °F (16 °C) • Wind: E at 13 miles per hour (21 km/h), gusts to 32 miles per hour (51 km/h)
- Game attendance: 61,897
- TV announcers (ESPN): Wes Durham (play-by-play), Dusty Dvoracek (analyst), and Taylor McGregor (sideline reporter)

Game information

First quarter

- (8:45) - LSU - Scott Starzyk 24-yard field goal (Drive: 14 plays, 69 yards, 6:15); Tigers 3-0
- (8:09) - UK - CJ Baxter 3-yard run (Adam Zouagui kick) (Drive: 2 plays, 80 yards, 0:30); Wildcats 7-3
- (1:39) - LSU - Zach Grace 22-yard pass from Sam Leavitt (Scott Starzyk kick) (Drive: 11 plays, 75 yards, 6:30); Tigers 10-7

Second quarter

- (13:06) - UK - Brock Coffman 55-yard punt return (Adam Zouagui kick) (Drive: 3 plays, 2 yards, 0:57); Wildcats 14-10
- (6:11) - LSU - Jackson Harris 10-yard pass from Sam Leavitt (Scott Starzyk kick) (Drive: 14 plays, 65 yards, 6:54); Tigers 17-14
- (0:03) - UK - Kenny Minchey 1-yard run (Adam Zouagui kick) (Drive: 15 plays, 75 yards, 6:11); Wildcats 21-17

Third quarter

- (2:13) - LSU - Scott Starzyk 24-yard field goal (Drive: 11 plays, 73 yards, 4:33); Wildcats 21-20

Fourth quarter

- (11:54) - UK - Adam Zouagui 28-yard field goal (Drive: 10 plays, 65 yards, 5:19); Wildcats 24-20
- (9:42) - LSU - Roman Mothershed 41-yard pass from Jackson Harris (Scott Starzyk kick) (Drive: 6 plays, 75 yards, 2:12); Tigers 27-24
- (0:12) - UK - Adam Zouagui 33-yard field goal (Drive: 9 plays, 63 yards, 1:25); Tied 27-27

Overtime

- LSU - Sam Leavitt 15-yard run (Scott Starzyk kick) (Drive: 2 plays, 25 yards); Tigers 34-27
- UK - CJ Baxter 1-yard run (Kenny Minchey Two-Point Conversion Run) (Drive: 5 plays, 25 yards); Wildcats 35-34

| Statistics | LSU | UK |
|---|---|---|
| First downs | 26 | 19 |
| Plays–yards | 71-410 | 68-401 |
| Rushes–yards | 36-94 | 32-155 |
| Passing yards | 316 | 246 |
| Passing: comp–att–int | 26-35-1 | 23-36-0 |
| Turnovers | 2 | 0 |
| Time of possession | 32:30 | 27:30 |

| Team | Category | Player | Statistics |
|---|---|---|---|
| LSU | Passing | Sam Leavitt | 25/34, 275 yards, 2 TD, 1 INT |
| LSU | Rushing | Dilin Jones | 16 carries, 56 yards |
| LSU | Receiving | Dilin Jones | 7 receptions, 84 yards |
| Kentucky | Passing | Kenny Minchey | 23/36, 246 yards |
| Kentucky | Rushing | CJ Baxter | 19 carries, 123 yards, 2 TD |
| Kentucky | Receiving | Kenny Darby | 4 receptions, 79 yards |

=== vs No. 16 Mississippi State (rivalry) ===
No. 16 Mississippi State Bulldogs (4–1) at No. 22 LSU Tigers (4–2) – Game summary

| Quarter | 1 | 2 | 3 | 4 | Total |
|---|---|---|---|---|---|
| No. 16 Bulldogs | 0 | 0 | 0 | 0 | 0 |
| No. 22 Tigers | 14 | 7 | 10 | 0 | 31 |

at Tiger Stadium • Baton Rouge, Louisiana

- Date: October 17
- Game time: 11:07 a.m. CDT
- Game weather: Clear • Temperature: 63 °F (17 °C) • Wind: NE at 18 miles per hour (29 km/h)
- Game attendance: 102,321
- Referee: Steve Marlowe
- TV announcers (ESPN): Roy Philpott (play-by-play), Brock Osweiler (analyst), and Stormy Buonantony (sideline reporter)

Game information

First quarter
Second quarter
Third quarter
Fourth quarter

| Statistics | MSST | LSU |
|---|---|---|
| First downs | 18 | 28 |
| Plays–yards | 68–291 | 69–379 |
| Rushes–yards | 42–170 | 31–90 |
| Passing yards | 121 | 289 |
| Passing: comp–att–int | 16–26–1 | 31–38–0 |
| Turnovers | 1 | 1 |
| Time of possession | 30:11 | 29:49 |

| Team | Category | Player | Statistics |
|---|---|---|---|
| Mississippi State | Passing | Billy Puckett | 16/26, 121 yards, INT |
| Mississippi State | Rushing | Kolin Wilson | 18 carries, 71 yards |
| Mississippi State | Receiving | Anthony Evans III | 7 receptions, 40 yards |
| LSU | Passing | Sam Leavitt | 31/38, 289 yards, 4 TD |
| LSU | Rushing | Dilin Jones | 18 carries, 84 yards |
| LSU | Receiving | Jackson Harris | 6 receptions, 85 yards, 2 TD |

=== at Auburn (rivalry) ===
No. 17 LSU Tigers (5–2) at Auburn Tigers (4–2) – Game summary

| Quarter | 1 | 2 | 3 | 4 | Total |
|---|---|---|---|---|---|
| No. 17 LSU | 10 | 21 | 0 | 7 | 38 |
| Auburn | 3 | 7 | 0 | 7 | 17 |

at Jordan–Hare Stadium • Auburn, Alabama

- Date: October 24
- Game time: 11:07 a.m. CDT
- Game weather: Sunny • Temperature: 65 °F (18 °C) • Wind: NE at 12 miles per hour (19 km/h)
- Game attendance: 88,043
- Referee: James Carter
- TV announcers (ABC): Sean McDonough (play-by-play), Greg McElroy (analyst), and Katie George (sideline reporter)

Game information

First quarter
Second quarter
Third quarter
Fourth quarter

| Statistics | LSU | AUB |
|---|---|---|
| First downs | 29 | 16 |
| Plays–yards | 80–552 | 65–271 |
| Rushes–yards | 34–165 | 35–67 |
| Passing yards | 387 | 204 |
| Passing: comp–att–int | 32–46–0 | 20–30–0 |
| Turnovers | 0 | 0 |
| Time of possession | 33:41 | 26:19 |

| Team | Category | Player | Statistics |
|---|---|---|---|
| LSU | Passing | Sam Leavitt | 32/45, 387 yards, 3 TD |
| LSU | Rushing | Dilin Jones | 21 carries, 92 yards, TD |
| LSU | Receiving | Jackson Harris | 9 receptions, 178 yards, 2 TD |
| Auburn | Passing | Byrum Brown | 15/24, 160 yards |
| Auburn | Rushing | Byrum Brown | 19 carries, 21 yards, TD |
| Auburn | Receiving | Keshaun Singleton | 4 receptions, 64 yards |

=== vs No. 5 Alabama (rivalry) ===
No. 5 Alabama Crimson Tide (6–2) at No. 14 LSU Tigers (6–2) – Game summary

| Quarter | 1 | 2 | 3 | 4 | Total |
|---|---|---|---|---|---|
| No. 5 Crimson Tide | 3 | 7 | 7 | 14 | 31 |
| No. 14 Tigers | 3 | 0 | 10 | 0 | 13 |

at Tiger Stadium • Baton Rouge, Louisiana

- Date: November 7
- Referee: Daniel Gautreaux
- TV announcers (ABC): Chris Fowler (play-by-play), Kirk Herbstreit (analyst), Holly Rowe, and Laura Rutledge (sideline reporters)

Game information

First quarter
Second quarter
Third quarter
Fourth quarter

| Statistics | ALA | LSU |
|---|---|---|
| First downs | | |
| Plays–yards | | |
| Rushes–yards | | |
| Passing yards | | |
| Passing: comp–att–int | | |
| Turnovers | | |
| Time of possession | | |

| Team | Category | Player | Statistics |
|---|---|---|---|
| Alabama | Passing | | |
| Alabama | Rushing | | |
| Alabama | Receiving | | |
| LSU | Passing | | |
| LSU | Rushing | | |
| LSU | Receiving | | |

=== vs No. 6 Texas ===
No. 6 Texas Longhorns (7–2) at No. 21 LSU Tigers (6–3) – Game summary

| Quarter | 1 | 2 | 3 | 4 | Total |
|---|---|---|---|---|---|
| No. 6 Longhorns | 7 | 3 | 3 | 9 | 22 |
| No. 21 Tigers | 7 | 7 | 7 | 0 | 21 |

at Tiger Stadium • Baton Rouge, Louisiana

- Date: November 14
- Game time: 6:30 p.m.
- Game weather: Cloudy • Temperature: 57 °F (14 °C) • Wind: NE at 7 miles per hour (11 km/h)
- Game attendance: 102,321
- Referee: Steve Marlowe
- TV announcers (ABC): Chris Fowler (play-by-play), Kirk Herbstreit (analyst) and Holly Rowe (sideline reporter)

Game information

First quarter

- (10:31) TEX – Arch Manning 1-yard run, Gianni Spetic kick (Drive: 11 plays, 75 yards, 4:29; Texas 7–0)
- (5:16) LSU – Jackson Harris 10-yard pass from Sam Leavitt, Scott Starzyk kick (Drive: 13 plays, 75 yards, 5:15; Tied 7–7)

Second quarter

- (9:17) LSU – Jackson Harris 9-yard pass from Sam Leavitt, Scott Starzyk kick (Drive: 2 plays, 7 yards, 0:41; LSU 14–7)
- (3:22) TEX – Gianni Spetic 42-yard field goal (Drive: 12 plays, 50 yards, 5:55; LSU 14–10)

Third quarter

- (5:52) LSU – Dilin Jones 44-yard run, Scott Starzyk kick (Drive: 7 plays, 72 yards, 2:58; LSU 21–10)
- (1:35) TEX – Gianni Spetic 41-yard field goal (Drive: 8 plays, 48 yards, 4:10; LSU 21–13)

Fourth quarter

- (11:37) TEX – Gianni Spetic 50-yard field goal (Drive: 6 plays, 21 yards, 2:34; LSU 21–16)
- (0:03) TEX – Raleek Brown 4-yard pass from Arch Manning (Drive: 12 plays, 58 yards, 2:16; Texas 22–21)

| Statistics | TEX | LSU |
|---|---|---|
| First downs | 20 | 19 |
| Plays–yards | 67–273 | 67–366 |
| Rushes–yards | 32–99 | 30–122 |
| Passing yards | 174 | 244 |
| Passing: comp–att–int | 19–35–3 | 27–37–3 |
| Turnovers | 3 | 3 |
| Time of possession | 29:38 | 30:22 |

| Team | Category | Player | Statistics |
|---|---|---|---|
| Texas | Passing | Arch Manning | 19/35, 174 yards, TD, 3 INT |
| Texas | Rushing | Arch Manning | 12 carries, 35 yards, TD |
| Texas | Receiving | Ryan Wingo | 6 receptions, 68 yards |
| LSU | Passing | Sam Leavitt | 27/37, 244 yards, 2 TD, 3 INT |
| LSU | Rushing | Dilin Jones | 19 carries, 125 yards, TD |
| LSU | Receiving | Eugene Wilson III | 7 receptions, 96 yards |

=== at No. 9 Tennessee ===
LSU Tigers (6–4) at No. 9 Tennessee Volunteers (8–2) – Game summary

| Quarter | 1 | 2 | 3 | 4 | Total |
|---|---|---|---|---|---|
| Tigers | 0 | 0 | 0 | 0 | 0 |
| No. 9 Volunteers | 0 | 0 | 0 | 0 | 0 |

at Neyland Stadium • Knoxville, Tennessee

- Date: November 21
- Game time: 3:30 p.m.
- Referee: Jason Autrey
- TV announcers (ABC): Sean McDonough (play-by-play), Greg McElroy (analyst), and Katie George (sideline reporter)

Game information

First quarter
Second quarter
Third quarter
Fourth quarter

| Statistics | LSU | TENN |
|---|---|---|
| First downs | | |
| Plays–yards | | |
| Rushes–yards | | |
| Passing yards | | |
| Passing: comp–att–int | | |
| Turnovers | | |
| Time of possession | | |

| Team | Category | Player | Statistics |
|---|---|---|---|
| LSU | Passing | | |
| LSU | Rushing | | |
| LSU | Receiving | | |
| Tennessee | Passing | | |
| Tennessee | Rushing | | |
| Tennessee | Receiving | | |

=== at Arkansas (Battle for the Boot) ===
LSU Tigers (0–0) at Arkansas Razorbacks (0–0) – Game summary

| Quarter | 1 | 2 | 3 | 4 | Total |
|---|---|---|---|---|---|
| Tigers | 0 | 0 | 0 | 0 | 0 |
| Razorbacks | 0 | 0 | 0 | 0 | 0 |

at Donald W. Reynolds Razorback Stadium • Fayetteville, Arkansas

- Date: November 28

Game information

First quarter
Second quarter
Third quarter
Fourth quarter

| Statistics | LSU | ARK |
|---|---|---|
| First downs | | |
| Plays–yards | | |
| Rushes–yards | | |
| Passing yards | | |
| Passing: comp–att–int | | |
| Turnovers | | |
| Time of possession | | |

| Team | Category | Player | Statistics |
|---|---|---|---|
| LSU | Passing | | |
| LSU | Rushing | | |
| LSU | Receiving | | |
| Arkansas | Passing | | |
| Arkansas | Rushing | | |
| Arkansas | Receiving | | |

== Personnel ==
=== Roster ===
2026 LSU Tigers football team roster
Players
Coaches
Offense

| Pos. | # | Name | Class |
|---|---|---|---|
| WR | 1 | Jayce Brown | Sr |
| WR | 2 | Tre' Brown | Jr |
| WR | 3 | Eugene Wilson III | Jr |
| WR | 4 | Jackson Harris | Jr |
| QB | 6 | Husan Longstreet | Fr |
| WR | 6 | Winston Watkins Jr. | So |
| QB | 10 | Sam Leavitt | Jr |
| QB | 11 | Landen Clark | So |
| TE | 12 | Malachi Thomas | Jr |
| RB | 13 | Dilin Jones | So |
| TE | 14 | Trey'Dez Green | Jr |
| WR | 15 | Phillip Wright III | Fr |
| QB | 19 | Kaden Martin | Sr |
| RB | 22 | Harlem Berry | So |
| RB | 23 | Stacy Gage | So |
| RB | 24 | Joseph Ebun | Jr |
| RB | 25 | Rod Gainey Jr. | So |
| RB | 27 | Raycine Guillory Jr. | Fr |
| RB | 29 | Caden Durham | Jr |
| TE | 44 | Zach Grace | Jr |
| TE | 47 | JD LaFleur | Fr |
| OL | 50 | William Satterwhite II | So |
| IOL | 51 | Ryan Miret | Fr |
| OL | 52 | Ja'Quan Sprinkle | Jr |
| OL | 53 | Hayes Fuqua | Fr |
| OL | 54 | Ja'Mard Jones Jr. | So |
| OL | 55 | Aliou Bah | Sr |
| OT | 57 | JaKolby Jones | Jr |
| OL | 61 | Braelin Moore | Sr |
| OT | 65 | Sean Thompkins Jr. | Jr |
| OT | 66 | Solomon Thomas | Fr |
| OL | 67 | Bo Bordelon | Sr |
| OL | 68 | Brett Bordelon | Fr |
| OT | 69 | Darrin Strey | Fr |
| OT | 70 | Devin Harper | So |
| OT | 71 | Brysten Martinez | Fr |
| OL | 73 | Adrian Lamb | So |
| OL | 74 | Braden Augustus | Jr |
| OT | 75 | Weston Davis | So |
| OL | 76 | Christian Stamps | Jr |
| OT | 77 | Jordan Seaton | Jr |
| WR | 80 | Brayden Allen | Fr |
| TE | 81 | Landon Craig | So |
| WR | 82 | Roman Mothershed | Jr |
| WR | 83 | Corey Barber Jr. | Fr |
| WR | 84 | Tyree Holloway | Jr |
| WR | 85 | Josh Jackson | So |
| WR | 86 | Jabari Mack | Fr |
| TE | 87 | JC Anderson | Fr |
| WR | 88 | Malik Elzy | Jr |

Defense

| Pos. | # | Name | Class |
|---|---|---|---|
| S | 0 | Tamarcus Cooley | Jr |
| DE | 1 | Princewill Umanmielen | Sr |
| S | 2 | Ty Benefield | Sr |
| CB | 3 | DJ Pickett | So |
| LB | 6 | TJ Dottery | Sr |
| CB | 8 | Ja'Keem Jackson | Jr |
| S | 10 | Dashawn Spears | Jr |
| CB | 11 | PJ Woodland | Jr |
| S | 13 | Faheem Delane | So |
| LB | 15 | Jaiden Braker | Fr |
| DE | 17 | Damien Shanklin | Fr |
| DE | 19 | Gabriel Reliford | So |
| CB | 21 | Michael Turner Jr. | So |
| CB | 22 | Havon Finney Jr. | Fr |
| CB | 23 | Aidan Anding | So |
| LB | 24 | Tylen Singleton | So |
| S | 25 | Aiden Hall | Fr |
| LB | 26 | Charles Ross II | So |
| CB | 27 | Dez Ellis | Fr |
| S | 28 | Jhase Thomas | Fr |
| DE | 29 | Jordan Ross | Jr |
| CB | 30 | Treylan James | Jr |
| LB | 31 | CJ Jimcoily | So |
| LB | 32 | Keylan Moses | Fr |
| S | 33 | Isaiah Washington | Fr |
| S | 34 | Mason Dossett | So |
| LB | 35 | Zach Weeks | Fr |
| CB | 36 | Emari Peterson | Fr |
| CB | 37 | Craig Walton Jr. | Jr |
| S | 38 | Jackson Williams | Fr |
| DB | 39 | Lavonte Williams | So |
| LB | 40 | Whit Weeks | Sr |
| LB | 42 | Davhon Keys | Jr |
| DB | 46 | Seth Knothe | Sr |
| DT | 47 | Malik Blocton | Jr |
| DE | 48 | Kolaj Cobbins | So |
| LB | 49 | Theo Grace | Fr |
| DE | 55 | Lamar Brown | Fr |
| LB | 56 | Jake Ibieta | Jr |
| DT | 87 | Joey August | Jr |
| DT | 88 | Richard Anderson | Fr |
| DT | 90 | Stephiylan Green | Jr |
| DE | 91 | Trenton Henderson | Fr |
| DT | 92 | Brandon Brown | Fr |
| DE | 93 | Jaylen Brown | So |
| DT | 95 | Shone Washington | Sr |
| DT | 96 | Dominic McKinley | Jr |
| DE | 97 | Dylan Carpenter | Jr |
| DT | 98 | Achilles Woods | So |
| DT | 99 | Deuce Geralds | Fr |

Special teams

| Pos. | # | Name | Class |
|---|---|---|---|
| K | 32 | Gavin Higgins | Fr |
| K | 36 | Aidan Corbello | So |
| LS | 39 | Mack Mulhern | Fr |
| LS | 43 | Silas Hall | So |
| K | 45 | Sean Perret | Fr |
| K | 80 | Scott Starzyk | So |
| P | 90 | Grant Chadwick | Jr |
| P | 99 | Hayden Craig | Fr |

Head coach

- Lane Kiffin

Coordinators/assistant coaches

- Blake Baker – Defensive coordinator
- Joe Cox – Co-offensive coordinator/tight ends
- James Cregg – Run-game specialist - offensive line
- Joe Houston – Special teams coordinator
- Sawyer Jordan – Inside wide receivers
- Chris Kiffin – Co-defensive coordinator/linebackers
- Sterling Lucas – Defensive line
- George McDonald – Passing game coordinator/wide receivers
- Jake Olsen – Safeties
- Kevin Peoples – Interior defensive line
- Corey Raymond – Secondary
- Kevin Smith – Running backs
- Lou Spanos – Assistant defensive line/pass rush specialist
- Dane Stevens – Quarterbacks
- Charlie Weis Jr. – Offensive coordinator
- Eric Wolford – Offensive line
- Ed Orgeron – Special assistant to recruiting and defense
- Nick Savage – Strength and conditioning
- Donovan Tate – Director of player development

Legend

- (C) Team captain
- (S) Suspended
- (I) Ineligible
- Injured
- Redshirt

Roster
Last update: June 19, 2026

=== Coaching staff ===
LSU Tigers coaches
| Coach | Position | Year | Alma mater |
| Lane Kiffin | Head coach | 1st | Fresno State (1998) |
| Charlie Weis Jr. | Offensive coordinator | 1st | Kansas (2015) |
| Blake Baker | Defensive coordinator | 3rd | Tulane (2008) |
| Joe Houston | Special teams coordinator | 1st | USC (2010) |
| Chris Kiffin | co-Defensive coordinator/linebackers coach | 1st | Colorado State (2005) |
| Dane Stevens | Quarterbacks coach | 1st | USC (2019) |
| Joe Cox | co-Offensive coordinator/Tight ends coach | 1st | Georgia (2009) |
| Eric Wolford | Offensive line coach | 1st | Kansas State (1994) |
| George McDonald | Passing Game Coordinator/Wide receivers coach | 1st | Illinois (1999) |
| Kevin Smith | Assistant Head Coach/Running backs coach | 1st | UCF (2015) |
| Sterling Lucas | Defensive line coach | 1st | NC State (2012) |
| Jake Olsen | Safeties coach | 3rd | Valley City State (2012) |
| Kevin Peoples | Edge Rushers coach | 3rd | Carroll College (1992) |
| Corey Raymond | Defensive backs coach | 3rd | Louisiana State (1991) |
| Nick Savage | Strength and conditioning coach | 1st | Youngstown State (2013) |
