= Mark Cala =

American football coach

Current position
- Title: Offensive coordinator, QB Coach
- Team: Missouri State
- Conference: Conference USA

Biographical details
- Born: October 2, 1992 (age 34); Albuquerque, New Mexico
- Education: University of Puget Sound

Playing career
- 2013–2014: Puget Sound
- Position: Defensive back

Coaching career (HC unless noted)
- 2015: Puget Sound (QB)
- 2016–2017: FAU (Analyst)
- 2018: Houston (GA)
- 2019: Florida State (GA)
- 2020–2022: Arkansas (Analyst)
- 2023–2024: TCU (QB)
- 2025: UTEP (OC/QB)
- 2026–present: Missouri State (OC/QB)

Mark Cala (born October 2, 1992) is an American football coach and former player. He is currently the offensive coordinator at the Missouri State University. He has coaching experience in 3 of the 4 power conferences, while building a reputation among the industry for his ability to develop quarterbacks.

== Playing career ==
Cala was an All State defensive back at NM powerhouse La Cueva High School where he was a two-way starter. Cala began his undergrad at New Mexico before transferring to Puget Sound. He played defensive back.

== Coaching career ==
=== Early coaching ===
After completing his playing career, Cala started his coaching journey as the quarterbacks coach at his alma mater, Puget Sound, in 2015.

=== Florida Atlantic ===
The following year, Cala joined Charlie Partridge’s staff as an offensive analyst working with the running backs and special teams at Florida Atlantic.

The next season, following a coaching change, Cala was retained by new head coach Lane Kiffin, and worked with the quarterback position group. This was the first year of a long working relationship with FAU offensive coordinator Kendal Briles.

=== Houston ===
In 2018, Cala was hired as an offensive graduate assistant at the University of Houston, joining Major Applewhite’s staff, following new Houston offensive coordinator, Briles. The following year, Cala was on the move again, and again following Briles, as he joined Willie Taggart’s staff at Florida State as a graduate assistant.

=== Arkansas ===
Prior to the 2020 season, once again following Briles, Cala was hired as an offensive analyst working with the quarterbacks at Arkansas, joining new head coach Sam Pittman’s inaugural staff.

=== TCU ===
When Briles was hired as the offensive coordinator for Sonny Dykes’ TCU team ahead of the 2023 season, Cala again joined him, this time earning an on-field position as the teams quarterbacks coach. Here he worked to develop Chandler Morris and Josh Hoover as the Horned Frogs looked to replace the production of Max Duggan.

=== UTEP ===
In January 2025, Cala was announced as the new offensive coordinator at UTEP, joining Scotty Walden’s staff. Cala was the offensive play caller for the Miners for the final 6 games of the 2025 season, during which UTEP averaged 348 yards and 28 points per game, which was on pace for the school's highest-scoring offense since 2010. A 14 point increase compared to the first half of the season.

=== Missouri State ===
Mark Cala joined the Missouri State football staff as offensive coordinator in January 2026.Upon his arrival he signed former 4 star Duke QB Henry Belin IV and former UTEP QB Skyler Locklear.

== Personal life ==
Cala graduated with a degree in business administration from Puget Sound in 2015.
