= Jackson Harris (American football) =

American football player

No. 4 – LSU Tigers
- Position: Wide receiver
- Class: Redshirt Junior

Personal information
- Born: Oakland, California, U.S.
- Listed height: 6 ft 3 in (1.91 m)
- Listed weight: 205 lb (93 kg)

Career information
- High school: Berkeley (Berkeley, California)
- College: Stanford (2023–2024); Hawaii (2025); LSU (2026–present)
- Stats at ESPN

Jackson Harris is an American college football wide receiver for the LSU Tigers. He previously played for the Stanford Cardinal and Hawaii Rainbow Warriors.

== Early life ==
Harris attended Berkeley High School in Berkeley, California. As a senior, he had 73 receptions for a state-leading 1,492 receiving yards and 24 touchdowns. He committed to Stanford University to play college football.

== College career ==
Harris played 2023 and 2024 at Stanford, appearing in nine games and had six receptions for 86 yards and a touchdown. After the 2024, season he entered the transfer portal and transferred to the University of Hawaiʻi at Mānoa. In his lone season at Hawaii in 2025, Harris was named first team All-Mountain West after recording 49 receptions for 963 yards and 12 touchdowns. After the season, he entered the transfer portal again and committed to Louisiana State University (LSU).

=== Statistics ===
Season	Team	Games		Receiving			
Season	Team	GP	GS	Rec	Yds	Avg	TD
2023	Stanford	3	0	3	67	22.3	0
2024	Stanford	6	1	3	19	6.3	1
2025	Hawaii	11	9	49	963	19.7	12
2026	LSU	7	6	27	456	16.9	5
Career		27	16	82	1,505	18.4	18
