= Corey Barber Jr. =

American football player (born 2008)

No. 83 – LSU Tigers
- Position: Wide receiver
- Class: Sophomore

Personal information
- Born: April 6, 2008 (age 18)
- Listed height: 5 ft 11 in (1.80 m)
- Listed weight: 183 lb (83 kg)

Career information
- High school: Clay-Chalkville (Pinson, Alabama)
- College: LSU (2026–present)
- Stats at ESPN

Corey Barber Jr. (born April 6, 2008) is an American college football wide receiver for the LSU Tigers.

== Early life ==
Barber Jr. attended Spain Park High School in Hoover, Alabama before transferring to Clay-Chalkville High School in Pinson, Alabama for his senior year. He had 74 receptions for 1,429 yards with 18 touchdowns as a junior and 68 receptions for 1,130 yards and 14 touchdowns as a senior. Barber Jr. was rated by Rivals.com as a five-star recruit. He originally committed to play college football at the University of Mississippi before flipping his commitment to the Louisiana State University (LSU) after head coach Lane Kiffin left Ole Miss to coach LSU.

== College career ==
After earning minimal playing time early on his freshman year at LSU in 2026, Barber Jr. had seven receptions for 83 yards and two touchdowns against the McNeese Cowboys.
