= Charlie Weis Jr. =

American football coach (born 1993)

Current position
- Title: Offensive coordinator
- Team: LSU
- Conference: SEC

Biographical details
- Born: April 29, 1993 (age 33)
- Education: Kansas (2015)

Coaching career (HC unless noted)
- 2011: Florida (OQC)
- 2012–2014: Kansas (team manager)
- 2015–2016: Alabama (OA)
- 2017: Atlanta Falcons (OA)
- 2018–2019: Florida Atlantic (OC/QB)
- 2020–2021: South Florida (OC/QB)
- 2022–2025: Ole Miss (OC/QB)
- 2026–present: LSU (OC)

Charles Joseph Weis Jr. (born April 29, 1993) is an American football coach who is the offensive coordinator at LSU. He previously served as the offensive coordinator at Ole Miss.

== Coaching career ==
=== Early career ===
Weis worked on his father's coaching staff at Notre Dame as a teen, holding up cards that described the opposing team's offensive personnel on the field. He began coaching at the age of 18, working as an offensive quality control coach at Florida under his father, who was then the offensive coordinator. After his father was named the head coach at the University of Kansas, Weis Jr. joined the staff as an undergraduate team manager. He earned a Bachelor of Science degree in psychology from Kansas in 2015 during his time there. After a stint as a volunteer training camp intern with the New England Patriots in 2014, Weis Jr. joined the coaching staff at Alabama as an offensive analyst in 2015. After Alabama offensive coordinator Lane Kiffin left to accept the head coaching position at Florida Atlantic, Weis Jr. joined his staff as the tight ends coach. His stint at this position was very brief, as he left to join the Atlanta Falcons coaching staff as an offensive assistant under Steve Sarkisian, Kiffin's brief successor as offensive coordinator at Alabama.

=== Florida Atlantic ===
Weis was named the offensive coordinator and quarterbacks coach at Florida Atlantic in 2018. 24 years old at the time of his hiring, Weis is believed to be the youngest coordinator in modern D1-A football history.

=== South Florida ===
After Florida Atlantic head coach Lane Kiffin left to accept the head coaching position at Ole Miss, Weis joined Jeff Scott's coaching staff at South Florida as the offensive coordinator and quarterbacks coach. In his initial contract with USF, Weis earned a salary of $350,000/year plus incentives. In both of his seasons as offensive coordinator, USF posted the third worst offense in the American Athletic Conference.

=== Ole Miss ===
On December 29, 2021, Weis Jr. was named the new offensive coordinator at Ole Miss under Lane Kiffin. In four seasons as offensive coordinator, Ole Miss finished no worse than third in total offense in the Southeastern Conference, leading the conference in offense in both 2024 and 2025.

Following head coach Kiffin's departure from Ole Miss to take the head coaching job at LSU, Weis Jr. will follow him and join his staff in Baton Rouge. However, he was allowed to remain in his position through the College Football Playoff, which Ole Miss is expected to compete in, following a 11–1 regular season.

== Personal life ==
Weis is married to Jennifer, a former figure skater. He is the son of former Notre Dame and Kansas head football coach and NFL assistant coach Charlie Weis. He has a younger sister, Hannah Margaret.
