= List of Ole Miss Rebels head football coaches =

The Ole Miss Rebels college football team represents the University of Mississippi (Ole Miss) in the Southeastern Conference (SEC). The Rebels compete as part of the National Collegiate Athletic Association (NCAA) Division I Football Bowl Subdivision. The program has had 39 head coaches since it began play during the 1893 season. The most recent head coach was Pete Golding, whose hiring was announced on November 30, 2025 after former coach Lane Kiffin left following the regular season to become the head coach at LSU.

The team has played 1,269 games, including 33 wins later vacated as a result of NCAA penalties, over 125 seasons. In that time, eight coaches have led the Rebels in postseason bowl games: Ed Walker, Johnny Vaught, Billy Brewer, Tommy Tuberville, David Cutcliffe, Houston Nutt, Hugh Freeze, and Kiffin. Vaught won six conference championships as a member of the SEC and three national championships with the Rebels.

Vaught is the leader in seasons coached and games won, with 190 victories during his 25 years with the program. C. D. Clark has the highest winning percentage of those who have coached more than one game, with .857. Z. N. Estes and Frank Mason have the lowest winning percentage of those who have coached more than one game, with .000. Of the 39 different head coaches who have led the Rebels, Vaught is the only one to have been inducted as a head coach into the College Football Hall of Fame.

== Key ==
Key to symbols in coaches list
General		Overall		Conference		Postseason (Note: Although the first Rose Bowl Game was played in 1902, it has been continuously played since the 1916 game, and is recognized as the oldest bowl game by the NCAA. "—" indicates any season prior to 1916 when postseason games were not played.)	
No.	Order of coaches (Note: A running total of the number of head coaches, with coaches who served separate tenures being counted only once. Interim head coaches are represented with "Int" and are not counted in the running total. "—" indicates the team played but either without a coach or no coach is on record. "X" indicates an interim year without play.)	GC	Games coached	CW	Conference wins	PW	Postseason wins
DC	Division championships	OW	Overall wins	CL	Conference losses	PL	Postseason losses
CC	Conference championships	OL	Overall losses	CT	Conference ties	PT	Postseason ties
NC	National championships	OT	Overall ties (Note: Overtime rules in college football were introduced in 1996, making ties impossible in the period since.)	C%	Conference winning percentage		
†	Elected to the College Football Hall of Fame	O%	Overall winning percentage (Note: When computing the win–loss percentage, a tie counts as half a win and half a loss.)				

== Coaches ==
List of head football coaches showing season(s) coached, overall records, conference records, postseason records, championships and selected awards (Note: Statistics correct as of the end of the 2025 NCAA Division I FBS football season.)
No.	Name	Term (Note: Ole Miss did not field teams for the 1897 season due to a yellow fever epidemic, and for the 1943 season due to World War II. Ole Miss did not have a head coach for the 1905 season.)	GC	OW	OL	OT	O%	CW	CL	CT	C%	PW	PL	PT	DC (Note: Divisional champions have advanced to the SEC Championship Game since the institution of divisional play beginning in the 1992 season. Since that time, Ole Miss has competed as a member of the SEC West.)	CC	NC	Awards
1	Alexander H. Bondurant	1893	5	4	1	0	0.800	—	—	—	—	—	—	—	—	—	0	—
2	Charles Dow Clark	1894	7	6	1	0	0.857	—	—	—	—	—	—	—	—	—	0	—
3	H. L. Fairbanks	1895	3	2	1	0	0.667	—	—	—	—	—	—	—	—	—	0	—
4	John W. Hollister	1896	3	1	2	0	0.333	—	—	—	—	—	—	—	—	—	0	—
5	T. G. Scarbrough	1898	2	1	1	0	0.500	—	—	—	—	—	—	—	—	—	0	—
6	W. H. Lyon	1899	7	3	4	0	0.429	2	4	0	0.333	—	—	—	—	0	0	—
7	Z. N. Estes	1900	3	0	3	0	.000	0	3	0	.000	—	—	—	—	0	0	—
8	William Shibley	1901	6	2	4	0	0.333	0	4	0	.000	—	—	—	—	0	0	—
9	Daniel S. Martin	1902	7	4	3	0	0.571	3	3	0	0.500	—	—	—	—	0	0	—
10	M. S. Harvey	1903–1904	11	6	4	1	0.591	3	4	1	0.438	—	—	—	—	0	0	—
11	Thomas S. Hammond	1906	6	4	2	0	0.667	3	2	0	0.600	—	—	—	—	0	0	—
12	Frank A. Mason	1907	6	0	6	0	.000	0	5	0	.000	—	—	—	—	0	0	—
13	Frank Kyle	1908	8	3	5	0	0.375	1	4	0	0.200	—	—	—	—	0	0	—
14	Nathan Stauffer	1909–1911	26	17	7	2	0.692	7	7	1	0.500	—	—	—	—	0	0	—
15	Leo DeTray	1912	8	5	3	0	0.625	2	2	0	0.500	—	—	—	—	0	0	—
16	William L. Driver	1913–1914	20	11	7	2	0.600	4	1	1	0.750	—	—	—	—	0	0	—
17	Fred Robbins	1915–1916	17	5	12	0	0.294	1	10	0	0.091	0	0	0	—	0	0	—
18	Dudy Noble	1917–1918	10	2	7	1	0.250	1	6	0	0.143	0	0	0	—	0	0	—
19	R. L. Sullivan	1919–1921	24	11	13	0	0.458	2	10	0	0.167	0	0	0	—	0	0	—
20	Roland Cowell	1922–1923	20	8	11	1	0.425	2	7	0	0.222	0	0	0	—	0	0	—
21	Chester S. Barnard	1924	9	4	5	0	0.444	0	3	0	.000	0	0	0	—	0	0	—
22	Homer Hazel	1925–1929	46	21	22	3	0.489	8	15	2	0.360	0	0	0	—	0	0	—
23	Ed Walker	1930–1937	84	38	38	8	0.500	11	26	3	0.313	0	1	0	—	0	0	—
24	Harry Mehre	1938–1942, 1944–1945	66	39	26	1	0.598	15	17	1	0.470	0	0	0	—	0	0	—
25	Harold Drew	1946	9	2	7	0	0.222	1	6	0	0.143	0	0	0	—	0	0	—
26	Johnny Vaught^{†} (Note: Johnny Vaught retired following the 1970 season due to a mild heart attack. He returned to coach the Rebels for the final eight games of the 1973 after the firing of Billy Kinard. Kinard finished the season with one win and two losses and Vaught finished with five wins and three losses.)	1947–1970; 1973	263	190	61	12	0.745	107	42	10	0.704	11	7	0		6	3 (1959, 1960, 1962)	—
27	Billy Kinard	1971–1973	25	16	9	0	0.640	6	7	0	0.462	0	0	0	—	0	0	—
28	Ken Cooper	1974–1977	44	21	23	0	0.477	12	14	0	0.462	0	0	0	—	0	0	—
29	Steve Sloan	1978–1982	55	20	34	1	0.373	8	22	1	0.274	0	0	0	—	0	0	—
30	Billy Brewer	1983–1993	126	68	55	3	0.552	33	41	0	0.456	3	1	0	0	0	0	—
31	Joe Lee Dunn	1994	11	4	7	0	0.364	2	6	0	0.250	0	0	0	0	0	0	—
32	Tommy Tuberville (Note: Tommy Tuberville resigned following the 1998 regular season to take the head coaching position at Auburn. David Cutcliffe was then hired and coached the Rebels to a victory in the 1998 Independence Bowl.)	1995–1998	45	25	20	0	0.556	12	20	0	0.375	1	0	0	0	0	0	—
33	David Cutcliffe	1998–2004	73	44	29	—	0.603	25	23	—	0.521	4	1	—	0	0	0	—
34	Ed Orgeron	2005–2007	35	10	25	—	0.286	3	21	—	0.125	0	0	—	0	0	0	—
35	Houston Nutt	2008–2011	50	24	26	—	0.480	10	22	—	0.313	2	0	—	0	0	0	
36	Hugh Freeze	2012–2016	54	35	19	—	0.648	17	15	—	0.531	3	1	—	0	0	0	—
37	Matt Luke (Note: Luke served as interim head coach during the 2017 season following the resignation of Hugh Freeze. The interim tag was removed following the 2017 season.)	2017–2019	36	15	21	—	0.416	6	18	—	0.375	0	0	—	0	0	0	—
38	Lane Kiffin	2020–2025	74	55	19	—	0.743	32	17	—	0.653	3	2	—	0	0	0	—
39	Pete Golding	2025–present	3	2	1	—	0.667	—	—	—	—	2	1	—	—	—	—	—
