= Kendal Briles =

American football player and coach (born 1982)

Current position
- Title: Offensive coordinator
- Team: South Carolina
- Conference: SEC

Biographical details
- Born: November 10, 1982 (age 43); Abilene, Texas, U.S.
- Education: University of Houston

Playing career
- 2001–2002: Texas
- 2003–2005: Houston
- Positions: Safety, wide receiver

Coaching career (HC unless noted)
- 2008–2011: Baylor (IWR/ORC)
- 2012–2014: Baylor (WR/PGC)
- 2015–2016: Baylor (OC/QB)
- 2017: Florida Atlantic (AHC/OC/QB)
- 2018: Houston (AHC/OC/QB)
- 2019: Florida State (OC/QB)
- 2020–2022: Arkansas (OC/QB)
- 2023–2025: TCU (AHC/OC/QB)
- 2026–present: South Carolina (OC/QB)

Kendal Briles (born November 10, 1982) is an American football coach. He was hired on December 9, 2025, as the offensive coordinator for the South Carolina Gamecocks. While coaching at Baylor, Briles' recruiting efforts were recognized in 2013 and 2014 as the Big 12’s Recruiter of the Year. In 2015, his first year as the offensive coordinator at Baylor, He was also a finalist for the Broyles Award for engineering the top ranked offense in the country.

== Playing career ==
In his junior year of high school, Briles led Stephenville High School to a 16–0 record and the 1999 Texas 4A State Championship while playing for his father. That year he won the Texas 4A Offensive Player of the Year and first-team all-state quarterback. He transferred to Wolfforth Frenship High as a senior when his father took an assistant coaching job at Texas Tech and was again named the Texas 4A Offensive Player of the Year.

Briles played college football at the University of Texas at Austin and University of Houston as a wide receiver and safety.

At Texas, Briles saw action on special teams as a redshirt freshman in 2001. In 2002 he played in seven games as a back-up safety, recording two interceptions and 10 tackles while also dealing with two injuries. At the end of the 2002 season, his father Art Briles became the head coach at Houston, and Kendal was granted a transfer to join him there.

At Houston he was moved to wide receiver, catching 70 passes for 680 yards and a score. He graduated in 2005 with a degree in sport management.

He was inducted into the Texas High School Football Hall of Fame in 2014.

== Coaching career ==
=== Baylor ===
In 2008, Briles joined his father at Baylor University as inside receivers coach and offensive recruiting coordinator. From 2012 to 2014 he served as Baylor's passing game coordinator, receivers coach and offensive recruiting coordinator. In 2015 Briles was promoted to offensive coordinator. He was a 2015 finalist for the Broyles Award, given annually to the nation's top college football assistant coach.

In 2016, Baylor's football team came under fire when it was revealed university officials had failed to take action regarding alleged rapes and other assaults by Baylor football players. The scandal led to the ouster of head football coach Art Briles (Kendal's father), the demotion and eventual resignation of Baylor University president Ken Starr, the resignation of athletic director Ian McCaw, and the firing of two others connected with the football program. A lawsuit filed after the scandal alleged that Kendal Briles had explicitly used the prospect of access to Baylor's female students to entice football recruits, with Briles quoted as telling a recruit "Do you like white women? Because we have a lot of them at Baylor and they love football players."

=== FAU ===
In December 2016, FAU announced that Kendal Briles would be their new offensive coordinator. Head coach Lane Kiffin said Briles will be given "full control" over the offense, including play-calling duties.

=== Houston ===
In January 2018, Briles became the new assistant head coach, offensive coordinator, and quarterbacks coach at his alma mater, the University of Houston. He resigned from this position on December 22, 2018.

=== Florida State ===
In December 2018, Briles became the new offensive coordinator and quarterbacks coach under Willie Taggart at Florida State University who was then fired with three games left in his second season. On December 11, 2019, new head coach Mike Norvell announced Kenny Dillingham as the Seminoles' new offensive coordinator, succeeding Briles.

=== Arkansas ===
On December 23, 2019, Briles was named the offensive coordinator at the University of Arkansas under new head coach Sam Pittman. In March 2022, Briles was given a raise and a contract extension through the 2024 season, after Arkansas finished the 2021 season 9–4 and won the 2022 Outback Bowl. Briles then turned down an offer to be the OC at Mississippi State, and was given another raise by Arkansas in early January 2023 after the 2022 Razorbacks finished the season 7–6 and won the 2022 Liberty Bowl. After TCU made a bid for Briles' services in mid-January, Arkansas refused to match the offer, deciding to not give Briles yet another raise. Briles was replaced at Arkansas by Maryland OC Dan Enos on the same day Briles was announced as the new coordinator for TCU.

=== TCU ===
Briles was hired by TCU as their offensive coordinator on January 19, 2023, replacing Garrett Riley.

=== South Carolina ===
Briles finalized a deal to be South Carolina's new offensive coordinator on December 9, 2025, replacing Mike Shula.

== Personal life ==
Briles' father, Art, was his head coach at Houston and Baylor and is currently the head coach at Eastern New Mexico. His brother-in-law is Mississippi State head coach Jeff Lebby.
