= Chris Kiffin =

American football coach (born 1982)

LSU Tigers
- Title: Co-defensive coordinator & linebackers coach

Personal information
- Born: January 19, 1982 (age 44); Raleigh, North Carolina, U.S.
- Listed height: 6 ft 1 in (1.85 m)
- Listed weight: 275 lb (125 kg)

Career information
- High school: Sickles (Citrus Park, Florida)
- College: Colorado State (2000–2004)

Career history
- Idaho (2005–2006) Assistant; Ole Miss (2007) Graduate assistant; Nebraska (2008–2009) Defensive quality control assistant; USC (2010) Defensive administrative assistant; Arkansas State (2011) Defensive line coach; Ole Miss (2012–2016) Defensive line coach & defensive recruiting coordinator; Florida Atlantic (2017) Defensive coordinator & linebackers coach; San Francisco 49ers (2018–2019) Pass rush specialist coach; Cleveland Browns (2020–2022) Defensive line coach; Houston Texans (2023) Linebackers coach; Ole Miss (2024–2025) Defensive analyst; LSU (2026–present) Co-defensive coordinator & linebackers coach

Chris Kiffin (born January 19, 1982) is an American football coach. He is currently the co-defensive coordinator and linebackers coach for LSU. He served as an assistant coach for the Houston Texans, Cleveland Browns, San Francisco 49ers, and Tampa Bay Buccaneers. He also coached at Florida Atlantic, Ole Miss, Arkansas State, USC, Nebraska, and Idaho.

== Coaching career ==
=== Idaho ===
In 2005, Kiffin started his coaching career at Idaho as a coaching assistant. In 2006, Kiffin was hired by the Tampa Bay Buccaneers as an offseason quality control intern under head coach Jon Gruden.

=== Nebraska ===
In 2008, Kiffin was hired as a defensive quality control coach at Nebraska.

=== USC ===
In 2010, Kiffin was hired as a defensive assistant at USC.

=== Arkansas State ===
In 2011, Kiffin was hired as a defensive line coach at Arkansas State.

=== Ole Miss ===
In 2012, Kiffin was hired as a defensive line coach at Ole Miss. He left in 2017 to join his brother.

=== Florida Atlantic ===
In 2017, Kiffin was hired by his brother, Lane, at Florida Atlantic as a defensive coordinator in 2016. After a 1-3 start, FAU won its final 10 games, allowing 24 or fewer points in each of its final six games.

Kiffin's defense included junior linebacker Azeez Al-Shaair and defensive backs Jalen Young and Shelton Lewis, both of whom were chosen First Team All-Conference USA.

=== San Francisco 49ers ===
In 2018, Kiffin was hired by the San Francisco 49ers as their pass rush specialist coach under head coach Kyle Shanahan.

=== Cleveland Browns ===
On February 13, 2020, Kiffin was hired by the Cleveland Browns as their defensive line coach under head coach Kevin Stefanski. After the 2021 season, Kiffin left the Browns coaching staff to join the coaching staff at Ole Miss. However, on February 10, 2022, Kiffin left Ole Miss returning to the Browns as a defensive line coach.

=== Houston Texans ===
On February 14, 2023, Kiffin left the Cleveland Browns to become a linebackers coach with the Houston Texans. Kiffin was fired a year later and replaced by Billy Davis.

=== Ole Miss ===
On August 25, 2024, Kiffin joined the Ole Miss coaching staff as an analyst. In 2025, he became the defensive line coach and the recruiting coordinator of the defense.

=== LSU ===
On December 22, 2025, Kiffin was announced as the Co-Defensive coordinator and Linebackers coach for LSU.

== Personal life ==
Chris Kiffin is the son of longtime National Football League defensive coordinator Monte Kiffin and his older brother is the LSU Tigers football head coach Lane. Chris and his wife, Angela, have four children: daughters, Bella, Grace and Taylor, and a son, Christian. A native of Tampa, Florida, Chris played defensive tackle for Colorado State University.
