= Lane Kiffin =

American football coach (born 1975)

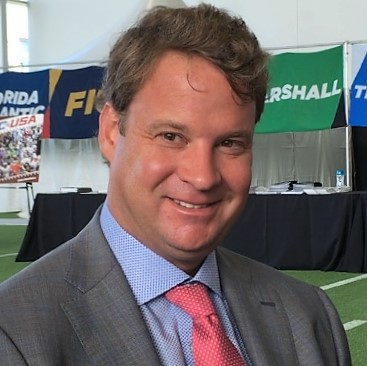
- Kiffin in 2018

Current position
- Title: Head coach
- Team: LSU
- Conference: SEC
- Record: 6–5
- Annual salary: $13 million

Biographical details
- Born: May 9, 1975 (age 51); Lincoln, Nebraska, U.S.

Playing career
- 1994–1996: Fresno State
- Position: Quarterback

Coaching career (HC unless noted)
- 1997–1998: Fresno State (assistant)
- 1999: Colorado State (GA)
- 2000: Jacksonville Jaguars (DQC)
- 2001: USC (TE)
- 2002–2003: USC (WR)
- 2004: USC (PGC/WR)
- 2005–2006: USC (OC/WR)
- 2007–2008: Oakland Raiders
- 2009: Tennessee
- 2010–2013: USC
- 2014–2016: Alabama (OC/QB)
- 2017–2019: Florida Atlantic
- 2020–2025: Ole Miss
- 2026–present: LSU

Head coaching record
- Overall: 122–58 (college); 5–15 (NFL)
- Bowls: 4–4

Accomplishments and honors

Championships
- As head coach: 2 C-USA (2017, 2019); 2 C-USA East Division (2017, 2019); As assistant coach: 3 national (2003, 2004, 2015) (Note: As a result of the 2011 NCAA sanctions imposed on USC because of the ineligibility of Reggie Bush, the Trojans' 2003 and 2004 national championships and Pac-10 conference titles were vacated.); Mountain West (1999); 5 Pac-10 (2002–2006); 3 SEC (2014–2016); 3 SEC West Division (2014–2016)

Lane Monte Kiffin (born May 9, 1975) is an American football coach who is the head coach for the LSU Tigers. He previously served as the head coach for the Oakland Raiders from 2007 to 2009, Tennessee Volunteers in 2009, USC Trojans from 2010 to 2013, Florida Atlantic Owls from 2017 to 2019, and Ole Miss Rebels from 2020 to 2025.

Kiffin was the youngest head coach in modern NFL history when he became the head coach of the Raiders and was the youngest head coach of a power conference team in college football when he was at Tennessee and USC. Kiffin later served as the offensive coordinator at the University of Alabama from 2014 until 2016, when he was hired to be the head coach at Florida Atlantic, a position he held until 2019, when he became the head coach at Ole Miss. In 2025, as his team was preparing for the playoffs, Kiffin left to become the head coach at LSU.

== Playing career ==
Kiffin is the son of longtime NFL defensive coordinator Monte Kiffin. He graduated from Bloomington Jefferson High School in Minnesota in 1994, and committed to Fresno State University to play college football. He played backup quarterback for the Bulldogs, giving up his senior season to become a Student Assistant Coach for position coach Jeff Tedford. According to teammate David Carr, Monte Kiffin forbade his son from quitting the team because of lack of playing time, so Lane became a coach instead. Kiffin graduated from Fresno State in 1998.

== Coaching career ==
=== Early positions ===
Kiffin worked as a graduate assistant for one year at Colorado State University. In 1999, while he was working with the offensive line, the Rams played in the Liberty Bowl. Kiffin secured a job with the Jacksonville Jaguars of the NFL as a quality control assistant for one year. He was then hired by head coach Pete Carroll as a tight ends coach at USC.

==== USC Trojans assistant coach ====
Kiffin began working with the University of Southern California (USC) staff during the 2001 season and became the wide receivers coach prior to the 2002 season. For the 2004 season, he added the duties of passing game coordinator, and he was promoted to offensive coordinator along with Steve Sarkisian who returned as USC's assistant head coach and quarterbacks coach for the 2005 season after Norm Chow left USC for the same position with the NFL's Tennessee Titans. In addition to his duties as offensive coordinator, Kiffin took the reins as recruiting coordinator that year. Along with these duties, Kiffin continued as the wide receivers coach. Under Kiffin and Sarkisian, the 2005 USC offense produced numerous school records, averaging 49.1 points and 579 yards per game and becoming the first in NCAA history to have a 3,000 yard passer (Matt Leinart), two 1,000 yard rushers (Reggie Bush and LenDale White), and a 1,000 yard receiver (Dwayne Jarrett). Steve Smith fell a few yards short of also surpassing 1,000 yards in receiving. In Kiffin's three years as recruiting coordinator at USC, the Trojans had the top ranked recruiting class in college football every year. In 2006, the Trojans finished first in the Pac-10 in passing efficiency by averaging 142.8 passer rating, produced two, 1,000-yard receivers – Dwayne Jarrett (1,105) and Steve Smith (1,083) – and a 3,000-yard passer John David Booty, with 3,347 yards. The team produced top 20 statistics in most NCAA offensive categories and concluded with a 32–18 win over the then #3 ranked team the University of Michigan in the Rose Bowl.

Kiffin helped guide USC to a 23–3 record during his tenure as offensive coordinator, an 88.5% win percentage; however, in June 2010, the NCAA retroactively declared Bush ineligible for the entire 2005 season, and forced USC to vacate all of its 2005 wins. Litigation from former coach Todd McNair to fight his defamation and to overturn those vacancies went on for ten years, before the defamation suit finally was settled through mediation in July 2021. The wins remained vacated.

=== Oakland Raiders ===
Raiders' owner Al Davis hired the 31-year-old Kiffin on January 23, 2007, making him the youngest head coach in Oakland Raiders history, and signed Kiffin to a two-year contract worth about $4 million with a team option for 2009. Pro Football Hall of Fame Coach John Madden was 32 when he was elevated to the head post by Davis in 1969. Davis had been known to select young, up-and-coming coaches in their thirties; those hires who fared well include Madden, Mike Shanahan, and Jon Gruden. All have won Super Bowls, though Madden is the only one of the three to win a championship with the Raiders. Davis himself was 34 when he began his tenure as coach of the Raiders. Age 31 at the time of his hiring by the Raiders (32 when he coached his first game), Kiffin became the youngest head coach in modern NFL history (i.e. since 1946); he also surpassed the New York Jets' Eric Mangini and the Pittsburgh Steelers' Mike Tomlin as the youngest head coach since the AFL–NFL merger in 1970.

On August 12, 2007, in his NFL head coaching debut, Kiffin and the Raiders won their preseason opener 27–23 over the Arizona Cardinals. Kiffin opposed the selection of LSU quarterback JaMarcus Russell in the 2007 NFL draft, who would eventually be regarded as one of the biggest draft busts in NFL history. Russell held out until September 12, and did not make his first start until December 2, long after the season was effectively over. Kiffin recorded his first regular season win as an NFL head coach on September 23, 2007; the Raiders defeated the Cleveland Browns by a score of 26–24 when defensive lineman Tommy Kelly blocked a late Cleveland field goal. At his end-of-the-season press conference, Kiffin told the media and his players that he had many plans and changes he was going to make in the 2008 offseason. When asked by his players about rumors that Kiffin was interested in open coaching positions in college football, he told them he never thought the rumors were important enough to address because he was never planning to leave.

==== Departure from the Raiders ====
On January 25, 2008, ESPN NFL analyst Chris Mortensen reported that Davis, who was not known for being patient with his coaches, tried to force Kiffin to resign after his first season ended with a 4–12 record. A source allegedly close to Kiffin told Mortensen that Kiffin would not resign, and would not sign the letter of resignation that would cause him to forfeit his $2 million salary for the remaining guaranteed year of his contract. However, the Raiders denied the story, while Kiffin refused to comment.

On September 15, 2008, NBC Sports reported Davis was unhappy with Kiffin, and intended to fire him as soon as the following Monday or Tuesday. On September 30, 2008, Davis fired Kiffin over the telephone. At the televised news conference announcing the firing, Davis called Kiffin "a flat-out liar" and said he was guilty of "bringing disgrace to the organization". The Raiders said the move was made for cause, meaning they would terminate his contract immediately without paying the $2.6 million that was left on it for 2008. Kiffin later added in an interview with ESPN that he was not proud to be associated with Davis's accusations and was actually more embarrassed for Davis than himself. The Raiders subsequently released a letter Davis sent to Kiffin on September 12 that warned him that he was on the verge of being fired for "conduct detrimental to the Raiders", including repeated instances of making excuses and outright lies. Kiffin's post-firing press conference was canceled. Kiffin filed a grievance against the Raiders, claiming that he was fired without cause, but on November 15, 2010, an arbitrator ruled that Davis did indeed have cause to fire Kiffin. Kiffin's short tenure as the Raiders' head coach ended with a 5–15 record. Offensive line coach Tom Cable was given interim head coaching duties for the remainder of the 2008 season and was later made their permanent head coach on February 4, 2009.

Several of his former Raiders staff expressed interest as Kiffin began assembling his new staff at the University of Tennessee. On December 15, 2008, Raiders head coach Cable lashed out at Kiffin for hiring one of his assistants, James Cregg, with two weeks remaining in the NFL season. Cable called the timing of Cregg's departure "wrong in the business of coaching" and indicated he had lost respect for Kiffin and planned to confront him about it. Nothing further was said publicly regarding the incident.

Despite the animosity between the Raiders and Kiffin, he released a statement following Al Davis's death in October 2011 stating that although their relationship had not ended well, he appreciated the opportunity Davis had given him and had "nothing but the greatest respect" for the late Raiders owner.

=== Tennessee Volunteers ===
Kiffin with Tennessee

On November 28, 2008, multiple media outlets reported that Kiffin would be the next head football coach for the University of Tennessee Volunteers in 2009, replacing head coach Phillip Fulmer, who was fired. Tennessee formally introduced Kiffin as the school's 21st head football coach on December 1, 2008, in a 2:00 p.m. news conference.

At the age of 33, Kiffin was hired by Tennessee and became the youngest active head coach in Division I FBS, surpassing Northwestern's Pat Fitzgerald.

Kiffin signed a memorandum of understanding with the University of Tennessee on November 30, 2008. The deal included $2 million in 2009, with additional performance bonuses, including a $300,000 bonus if Tennessee was to compete for the national championship. His salary was set to increase over the six-year-deal, reaching a high of $2.75 million in 2014. The average salary of the deal was $2.375 million. If Kiffin had been fired in 2009 or 2010, the school would have to pay him $7.5 million under a buyout clause; after the 2012 season, the buyout clause decreased to $5 million. Kiffin's contract stated that if he resigned, he would have to pay UT $1 million in 2009, with the sum decreasing by $200,000 each year of his contract.

Kiffin led the Volunteers to a 7–6 record in 2009, an improvement from their 5–7 record in 2008. Highlights included wins over South Carolina, Georgia, and Kentucky. However, the season was marred by losses to UCLA, Florida, Auburn, Alabama, and Ole Miss, as well as a 23-point blow-out loss to Virginia Tech in the Chick-fil-A Bowl. After one season as coach, Kiffin left the Volunteers during the 2010 recruiting season to accept the head coaching job at the University of Southern California after Carroll left for the Seattle Seahawks.

==== Remarks and accusations ====
On February 5, 2009, during a Tennessee booster breakfast at the Knoxville Convention Center, Kiffin accused Urban Meyer, then head coach of the Florida Gators and subsequently head coach of the Ohio State Buckeyes, of violating NCAA recruiting rules.

I'm going to turn Florida in right here in front of you," Kiffin told the crowd. "As Nu'Keese (Richardson) was here on campus, his phone keeps ringing. And so one of our coaches is sitting in the meeting with him and says, 'Who is that?' And he looks at the phone and says, 'Urban Meyer.' Just so you know, you can't call a recruit on another campus. But I love the fact that Urban had to cheat and still didn't get him.

While Kiffin accused Meyer of violating NCAA rules, he incidentally violated a Southeastern Conference rule that prevented coaches from mentioning a recruit by name. Kiffin's accusations against Meyer were mistaken. Southeastern Conference commissioner Mike Slive issued a public reprimand to Kiffin because of the comment. In addition to the SEC's public reprimand, Florida Athletic Director Jeremy Foley demanded a public apology from Kiffin. Kiffin issued a public apology one day after making the comment. In a statement released by the University of Tennessee, Kiffin wrote, "In my enthusiasm for our recruiting class, I made some statements that were meant solely to excite those at the breakfast. If I offended anyone at the University of Florida, including Mr. Foley and Urban Meyer, I sincerely apologize. That was not my intention."

Kiffin generated further controversy when he told wide receiver recruit Alshon Jeffery that if Jeffery chose the University of South Carolina Gamecocks, "he would end up pumping gas for the rest of his life like all the other players from that state who had gone to South Carolina." Jeffery went on to sign with the Gamecocks, became the second round, 45th pick overall in the 2012 NFL draft by the Chicago Bears, and subsequently a member of the Super Bowl LII champions, the Philadelphia Eagles. Kiffin denied making the statement, however the incident was corroborated by Jeffery's high school coach Walter Wilson, who was listening to Kiffin's remarks on speakerphone.

==== Departure from Tennessee ====
Kiffin's departure for USC in 2010 after just one season as head coach of the Volunteers upset many students and fans of the University of Tennessee. When Tennessee athletic director Mike Hamilton was asked for an assessment of Kiffin's tenure coaching the Volunteers, he responded with just one word: "Brief." Hundreds of students rioted on campus at the news of Kiffin's departure. Knoxville police and fire department were brought in after students blocked the exit from the Neyland Thompson Sports Center and started several small fires.

=== USC Trojans ===
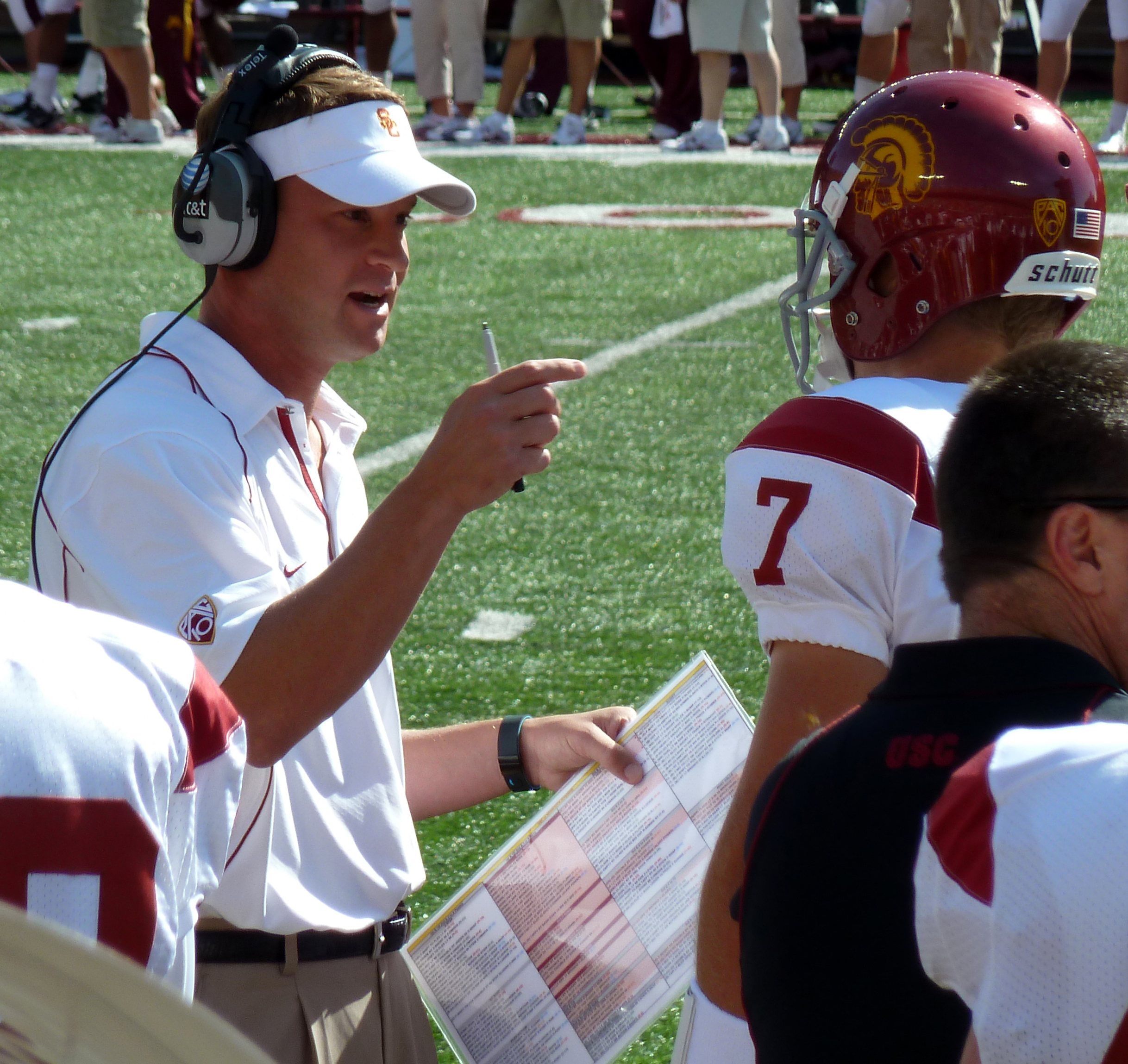
Kiffin talking to Trojans quarterback Matt Barkley in 2010

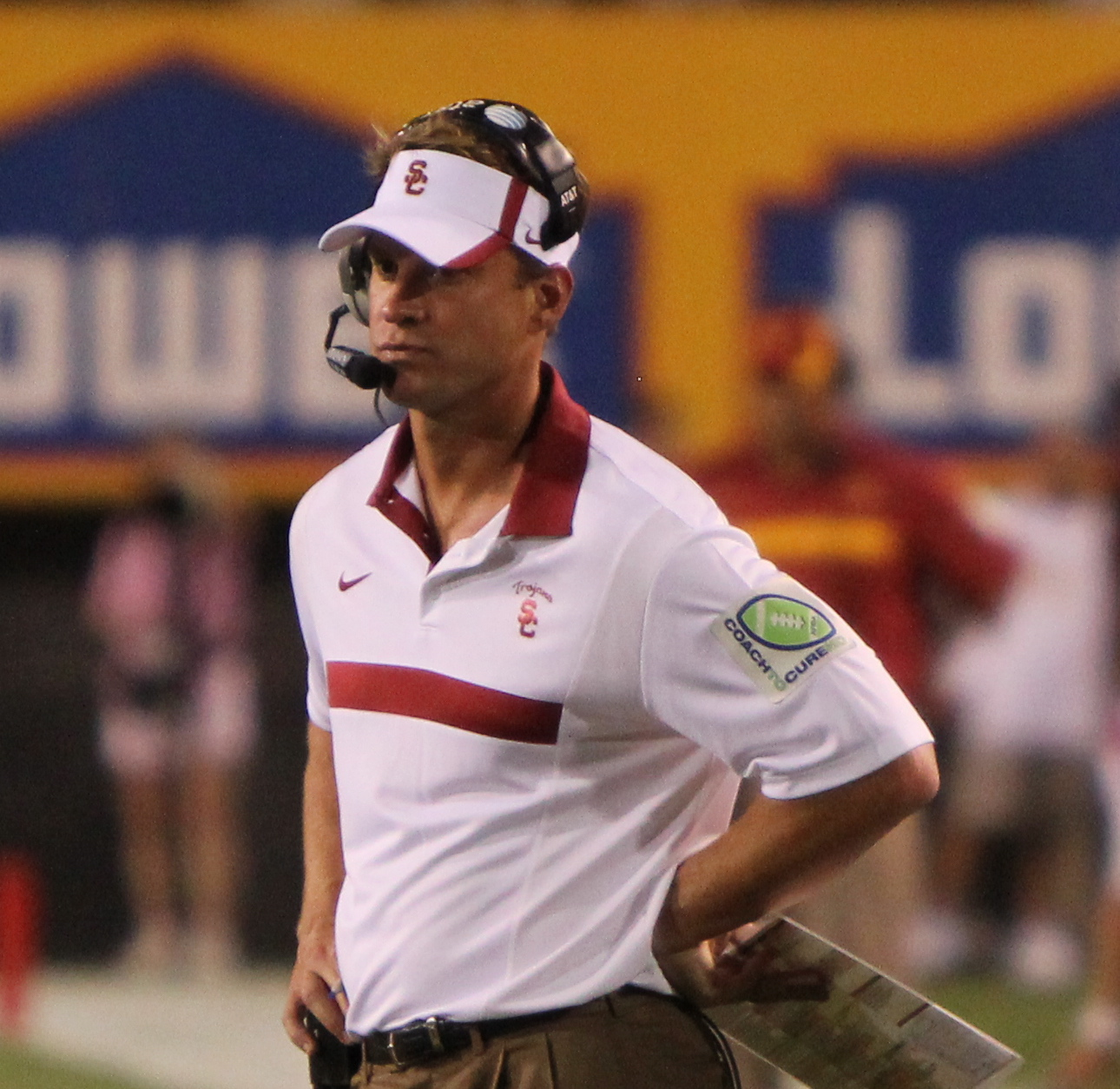
Kiffin with the USC Trojans in 2011

On January 12, 2010, Kiffin returned to USC to become the Trojans' head coach. This came following Carroll's departure from USC to become the head coach of the Seattle Seahawks.

In June 2010, after a prolonged four-year investigation into whether former USC running back Reggie Bush and his family had accepted financial benefits and housing from two sports agents in San Diego while he was a student athlete at USC, the NCAA imposed sanctions against the Trojan football program for a "lack of institutional control", including a two-year postseason ban, the loss of 30 scholarships over three years, and the vacating of all wins in which Bush participated as an "ineligible" player, including the 2005 Orange Bowl, in which the Trojans won the BCS National Championship. The severity of these sanctions has been criticized by some NCAA football writers, including ESPN's Ted Miller, who wrote, "It's become an accepted fact among informed college football observers that the NCAA sanctions against USC were a travesty of justice, and the NCAA's refusal to revisit that travesty are a massive act of cowardice on the part of the organization."

==== 2010 season ====
In 2010, his first season at USC, Kiffin's Trojans team finished the season with an 8–5 record but were ineligible for post-season play due to the NCAA sanctions. After the NCAA issued a guideline allowing current USC juniors and seniors to automatically transfer from USC without having to sit out a year, several USC players left before the start of the 2010 season, including Malik Jackson and Byron Moore to Tennessee, Travon Patterson to Colorado, D.J. Shoemate to Connecticut, Uona Kaveinga to BYU, and Blake Ayles to Miami, among others. Seantrel Henderson, who had signed a letter of intent to USC, was granted a release by Kiffin and immediately enrolled at Miami. Kiffin and former head coach Pete Carroll publicly referred to this NCAA-transfer exception as "free agency" because it allowed current USC players to be targeted for transfer opportunities and granted them immediate eligibility at their transfer destination. USC played the 2010 season with just 71 scholarship players, some of whom were redshirt candidates who did not play, instead of the normal NCAA allowance of 85 scholarship players.

Season highlights included a 48–14 win over the California Golden Bears in which quarterback Matt Barkley tied the USC record for touchdown passes in a game by completing five in just the first half to put the Trojans up 42–0 at halftime. After losing to rival Notre Dame for the first time in eight years, USC bounced back to close their season with a win over cross-town rival UCLA to retain the Victory Bell. Quarterback Matt Barkley returned after missing the previous week and threw one of the team's two touchdown passes. Allen Bradford led the Trojans by gaining 212 yards rushing and catching a 47-yard touchdown pass.

==== 2011 season ====
In 2011, Kiffin coached the Trojans to a 10–2 record (7–2 in the Pac-12), despite being ineligible for post-season play for the second consecutive season. On May 26, 2011, the NCAA's Appeals Committee upheld the sanctions against USC, after ruling that the use of precedent was not allowed under NCAA Bylaws, so the USC football team could not participate in the Pac-12 Football Championship Game (although they held the best record in the South division) or play in a bowl game during the 2011–12 season. The BCS stripped USC of the 2004 title, though USC still retains the 2003 and 2004 AP National Championships.

Season highlights included road wins against the California Golden Bears, Notre Dame Fighting Irish, and Oregon Ducks. Kiffin's Trojans lost in triple overtime to the Stanford Cardinal, who were led by quarterback Andrew Luck, but they bounced back by winning their last four games and defeating the UCLA Bruins 50–0 at the Los Angeles Memorial Coliseum, which extended the Trojans' victory streak against the Bruins to five.

USC ended the season with two thousand-yard receivers (Robert Woods and Marqise Lee), a thousand-yard rusher (Curtis McNeal), and a 3,000-yard passer (Matt Barkley) for the first time since the 2005 season, when Kiffin was the offensive coordinator.

==== 2012 season ====
Kiffin for the first time became a voting member of the USA Today Coaches' Poll, but he resigned after just one vote amidst controversy over his preseason selection of USC as No. 1. After being informed that Arizona coach Rich Rodriguez had voted the Trojans as the top team, Kiffin told reporters, "I would not vote USC No. 1, I can tell you that much." However, USA Today, citing the need to "protect the poll's integrity", revealed that Kiffin had voted his team for the top spot. Kiffin apologized and explained that his comments were from the perspective of an opposing coach voting for USC. The Trojans finished the season with a 7–6 record overall and a 5–4 record in Pac-12 conference play. The Trojans were ranked #1 in both major polls at the start of the season, but a lackluster season (including a .500 record in conference play and a loss to archrival UCLA) left them unranked by the end of the season. Prior to 2012, the last time a team that was the pre-season ranked #1 finished the season unranked was the 1964 Ole Miss Rebels.

==== 2013 season and firing ====
The Trojans lost their first two conference games of the 2013 season against Washington State and Arizona State, making Kiffin's record 4–7 in his last eleven games. During the Washington State opener, USC fans began filling the Coliseum with boos and, late in the game, chants to "fire Kiffin". On September 28, 2013, after the 62–41 loss to Arizona State, USC Athletics Director Pat Haden fired Kiffin hours after the game, when the team arrived back in Los Angeles at 3 a.m. Kiffin was called off the team bus that was preparing to head back to campus from Los Angeles International Airport and taken to a small room inside the terminal where Haden told Kiffin he was being dismissed. After the meeting, Haden rejoined the team bus, and they headed back to campus with Kiffin's bags, leaving Kiffin behind at the airport. Haden supposedly met with USC president Max Nikias in the third quarter and they decided Kiffin should be terminated. Haden formally announced the decision to dismiss Kiffin the next day. Assistant coach Ed Orgeron took over for Kiffin and led the team to a 6–2 finish, including an upset win against Stanford at the Coliseum. USC won the 2013 Las Vegas Bowl under interim head coach Clay Helton against Fresno State. Former USC associate head coach and Washington head coach Steve Sarkisian was hired by Haden following the season.

=== Alabama Crimson Tide ===
In December 2013, Kiffin spent eight days in Tuscaloosa, Alabama reviewing the Alabama Crimson Tide football team's offense. On January 9, 2014, after Michigan hired Alabama offensive coordinator Doug Nussmeier, Kiffin interviewed for the vacant coordinator job. Kiffin was offered the job as offensive coordinator at Alabama and accepted on January 10.

In 2014, Kiffin was a finalist for the Broyles Award, given annually to the nation's top college football assistant coach.

During his time at Alabama, rumors spread of Kiffin using the alias “Joey Freshwater” when going out in downtown Tuscaloosa.

On January 2, 2017, three weeks after having accepted the head coaching job at Florida Atlantic, but electing to remain as the Alabama Offensive Coordinator through the playoffs, Kiffin was instead relieved of his duties as OC. He was replaced by another former USC head coach and his successor at that job, Steve Sarkisian, for the 2017 College Football Playoff National Championship 35–31 loss against Clemson and for the upcoming season.

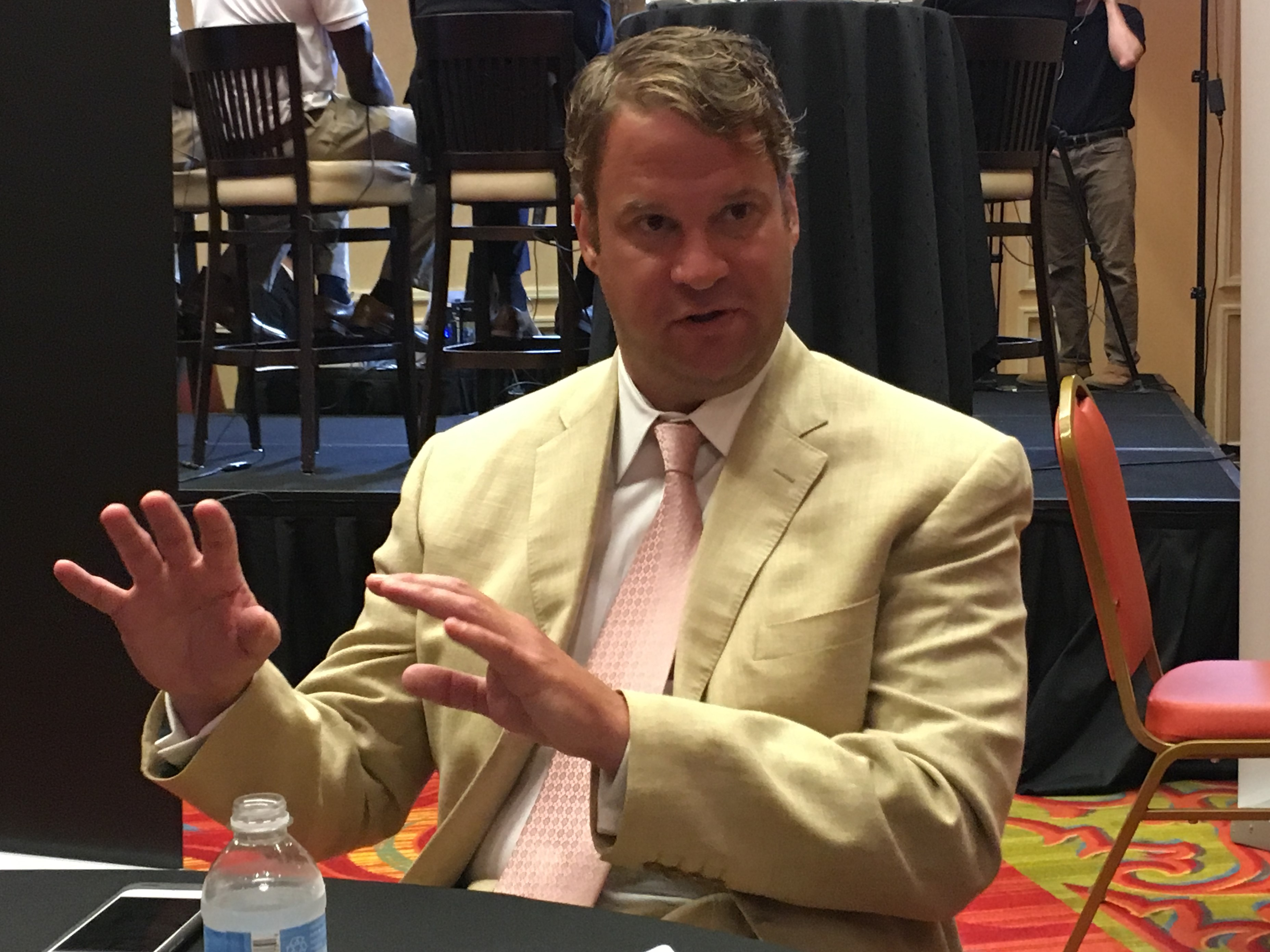
Kiffin at 2017 C-USA media days

=== Florida Atlantic Owls ===
On December 12, 2016, Kiffin accepted the head coaching position at Florida Atlantic University. After a 1–3 start, the FAU Owls reeled off ten straight wins, culminating in the Conference USA (C-USA) football championship against University of North Texas, 41–17, on their home field. FAU was slated to play the University of Akron in the Boca Raton Bowl on December 19, 2017. Before the game against Akron, Kiffin and FAU agreed to a new ten-year deal. John Kelly, the president of FAU, stated, "This is further proof of FAU's unbridled ambition [...] I thought we could be a Top-25 program and we need a coach who can do that, he's on the verge of doing that. We're obviously looking toward keeping Lane long term." Kiffin led the Owls to a 50–3 victory over Akron in the Boca Raton Bowl, culminating in an 11–3 season in his first year. The 11–3 season was the first season over .500 for the FAU Owls since 2008, and the first time they have achieved over ten wins while competing at Division 1 football. The 2017 FAU football season is only the 4th time in school history they had a winning record in Division 1 football. In 2019, Kiffin once again led FAU to a 10-win season and a second C-USA championship.

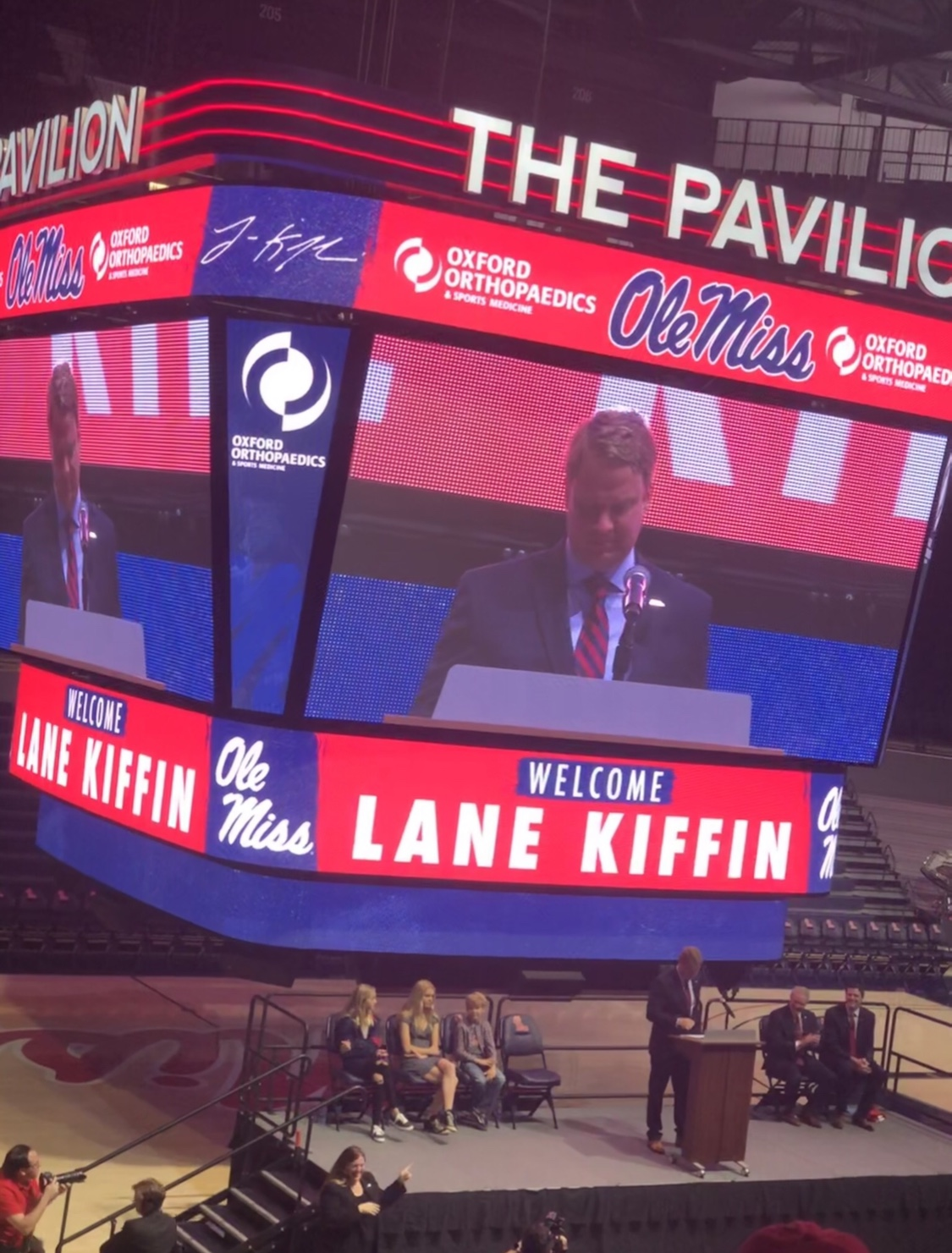
Kiffin's introductory press conference at Ole Miss on December 9, 2019

=== Ole Miss Rebels ===
On December 7, 2019, following FAU's blowout win in the C-USA championship game over UAB (49–6), it was confirmed by Ole Miss AD Keith Carter that Kiffin would be the next head coach at Ole Miss. On December 9, Kiffin was officially introduced as the 39th head football coach at Ole Miss. Kiffin's four-year contract totaled $16.2 million and would pay him $3.9 million in 2020 with a $100,000 yearly increment thereafter. Kiffin won his first game at Ole Miss in the second game of the 2020 season at Kentucky, a 42–41 win in overtime. In Kiffin's first season Ole Miss finished 5–5 with a 4–5 record in the SEC leading to a 2021 Outback Bowl invitation. After winning the Outback Bowl Kiffin was given a one-year contract extension by Ole Miss (the maximum extension Ole Miss could offer since Mississippi state law only allows four-year total contracts for university employees), however financial details were not immediately released. New contract details were released in August 2021 and amounted to $21 million in base pay through 2024, with $4.5 million paid out in 2021 and over $5 million in each of the remaining three seasons.

Prior to the 2021 season, Kiffin led Ole Miss to become the first NCAA football team 100% vaccinated against COVID-19. This was particularly notable because at the time of Ole Miss' announcement the state of Mississippi ranked 49th out of 50 in COVID-19 vaccination rates. Kiffin tested positive for COVID-19 two days before the 2021 Ole Miss opener in the Chick-fil-A Kickoff Game with Louisville and would not make the trip with the team. With a 31–21 victory in the Egg Bowl against rival Mississippi State, the Rebels would finish the 2021 regular season 10–2. This was only the second time in half a century that Ole Miss had won 10 games, and the first time ever that it finished the regular season with 10 wins. By comparison, the Rebels' winningest coach, Hall of Famer Johnny Vaught, never won more than nine games in a regular season (though he added a 10th win in a bowl game four times).

The Rebels slipped to 8–5 in 2022, but rebounded strongly to finish 11–2 in 2023 with a victory in the Peach Bowl, the first 11-win season in school history.

In the 2024 season, Kiffin led the Rebels to a 9–3 record, highlighted with an upset victory over #2 Georgia. In the Gator Bowl, Ole Miss defeated Duke 52–20 and finished the season 10–3. Additionally, Jaxson Dart became the winningest quarterback in program history and set the Ole Miss single-season passing yards record.

In the 2025 season, Kiffin led the Rebels to an 11-win regular season for the first time in school history, highlighted by victories over #4 LSU and #11 Oklahoma in Norman.

Kiffin's record with Ole Miss was 55–19, making him the third-winningest head coach in program history.

==== Departure from Ole Miss ====
For much of the 2025 season, Kiffin was mentioned as a potential hire to fill head-coaching vacancies at LSU, Florida, and Penn State. On November 22, 2025, Ole Miss Athletic Director Keith Carter confirmed that "an announcement on Coach Kiffin's future is expected" on November 29, a day after the annual Egg Bowl game against Mississippi State. On the same day, it was reported that LSU was finalizing an offer that would make Kiffin one of the highest-paid college football coaches.

On November 30, 2025, Kiffin was to meet with the team at 9 a.m., but the meeting was postponed after reports of issues regarding staff retention, as Kiffin was seeking to bring a large contingent with him to Baton Rouge, and whether Kiffin would be allowed to coach the team for a potential College Football Playoff run. The meeting went on at 1 p.m., with Kiffin absent at the request of Carter. After the meeting, the team announced that defensive coordinator Pete Golding would take over as the head coach for the playoffs, and was expected to become the full-time head coach.

Shortly after, Kiffin confirmed reports that he was leaving Ole Miss to become the head coach at LSU via a post on X. Kiffin added that his request to coach the team during a potential College Football Playoff run "was denied" by Carter, making the previous day's Egg Bowl victory over Mississippi State Kiffin's final game with the Rebels program. Boarding the plane taking him to Baton Rouge from University-Oxford Airport, Kiffin and his traveling contingent were loudly booed and jeered with obscenities by Ole Miss fans.

=== LSU Tigers ===
On the evening of November 30, 2025, Kiffin was named as the school's 34th head football coach. He signed a seven-year, $91 million deal, making him one of the highest-paid coaches in the sport. It includes bonuses that could net him up to $1 million if the Tigers win the National Championship.

== Personal life ==
Lane Kiffin's father was football coach Monte Kiffin. Kiffin's brother, Chris, was a defensive lineman at Colorado State University and was the linebackers coach for the Houston Texans. Kiffin's former father-in-law, John Reaves, was a former starting NFL and USFL quarterback who played college football for the Florida Gators.

Lane and his ex-wife Layla Reaves, a University of Florida alumna, have three children. On February 28, 2016, the couple announced they would divorce. Kiffin's daughter, Presley, plays volleyball at USC.

In 2024, Kiffin said he had been sober and abstinent from alcohol for three and a half years.

== Head coaching record ==
=== NFL ===
Team	Year	Regular season					Postseason			
Team	Year	Won	Lost	Ties	Win %	Finish	Won	Lost	Win %	Result
OAK	2007	4	12	0	.250	4th in AFC West	–	–	–	–
OAK	2008	1	3	0	.250	–	–	–	–	–
Total		5	15	0	.250		–	–	–	

=== College ===
Year	Team	Overall	Conference	Standing	Bowl/playoffs	Coaches^{#}	AP^{°}
Tennessee Volunteers (Southeastern Conference) (2009)
2009	Tennessee	7–6	4–4	T–2nd (Eastern)	L Chick-fil-A		
Tennessee:		7–6	4–4				
USC Trojans (Pac-10/Pac-12 Conference) (2010–2013)
2010	USC	8–5	5–4	T–3rd	(Note: Ineligible for Pac-12 title, bowl game and Coaches Poll due to NCAA sanctions.)		
2011	USC	10–2	7–2	1st (South)			6
2012	USC	7–6	5–4	T–2nd (South)	L Sun		
2013	USC	3–2 (Note: Kiffin was fired on September 29, 2013.)	0–2				
USC:		28–15	17–12				
Florida Atlantic Owls (Conference USA) (2017–2019)
2017	Florida Atlantic	11–3	8–0	1st (East)	W Boca Raton		
2018	Florida Atlantic	5–7	3–5	5th (East)			
2019	Florida Atlantic	10–3	7–1	1st (East)	Boca Raton (Note: Departed Florida Atlantic for Ole Miss before bowl game.)		
Florida Atlantic:		26–13	18–6				
Ole Miss Rebels (Southeastern Conference) (2020–2025)
2020	Ole Miss	5–5	4–5	5th (Western)	W Outback		
2021	Ole Miss	10–3	6–2	2nd (Western)	L Sugar^{†}	11	11
2022	Ole Miss	8–5	4–4	T–3rd (Western)	L Texas		
2023	Ole Miss	11–2	6–2	T–2nd (Western)	W Peach^{†}	9	9
2024	Ole Miss	10–3	5–3	T–4th	W Gator	13	11
2025	Ole Miss	11–1	7–1	T–1st	CFP First Round (Note: Departed Ole Miss for LSU before playoffs.)	3	3
Ole Miss:		55–19	32–17				
LSU Tigers (Southeastern Conference) (2026–present)
2026	LSU	6–5	3–5				
LSU:		6–5	3–5				
Total:		122–58					
National championship Conference title Conference division title or championship game berth
^{†}Indicates CFP / New Years' Six bowl.; ^{#}Rankings from final Coaches Poll.; ^{°}Rankings from final AP Poll.
