= 2025–26 College Football Playoff =

Postseason college football tournament

- Season: 2025
- Dates: December 19, 2025 – January 19, 2026
- Teams invited: (1) Indiana; (2) Ohio State; (3) Georgia; (4) Texas Tech; (5) Oregon; (6) Ole Miss; (7) Texas A&M; (8) Oklahoma; (9) Alabama; (10) Miami (FL); (11) Tulane; (12) James Madison
- Venues: Campus sites: Autzen Stadium; Gaylord Family Oklahoma Memorial Stadium; Kyle Field; Vaught–Hemingway Stadium; Neutral sites: AT&T Stadium; Caesars Superdome; Hard Rock Stadium; Mercedes-Benz Stadium; Rose Bowl; State Farm Stadium
- Champions: Indiana (1st CFP title, 1st overall title)

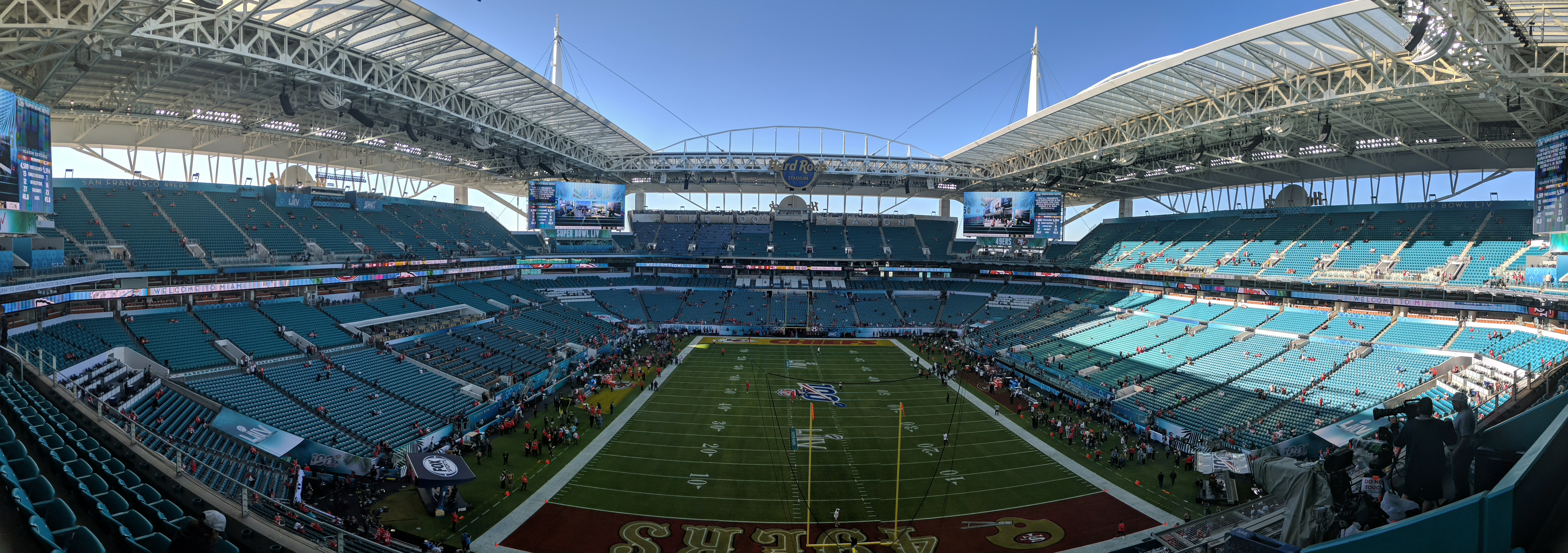
Hard Rock Stadium in Miami Gardens, Florida, hosted the College Football Playoff National Championship.

The 2025–26 College Football Playoff was a single-elimination postseason tournament that determined the national champion of the 2025 NCAA Division I FBS football season. It was the 12th edition of the College Football Playoff (CFP) and the second to include 12 teams.

The teams selected represented six conferences. The Southeastern Conference (SEC) had five teams selected (No. 3 Georgia, No. 6 Ole Miss, No. 7 Texas A&M, No. 8 Alabama, and No. 9 Oklahoma), and the Big Ten Conference had three (No. 1 Indiana, No. 2 Ohio State, and No. 5 Oregon). One team each was selected from the Big 12 Conference (No. 4 Texas Tech), the Atlantic Coast Conference (ACC; No. 10 Miami), the American Conference (No. 20 Tulane), and the Sun Belt Conference (No. 24 James Madison).

The playoff bracket's four first round games were held on December 19 and 20 at campus sites. The four first round winners—Oregon, Ole Miss, Alabama, and Miami—advanced to the quarterfinals. They played the top four seeds—Indiana, Ohio State, Georgia, and Texas Tech—on December 31 and January 1 at the Cotton Bowl Classic, Orange Bowl, Rose Bowl, and Sugar Bowl. Quarterfinal winners advanced to the semifinals, held at the Fiesta Bowl on January 8 and Peach Bowl on January 9, and then to the CFP National Championship game on January 19 at Hard Rock Stadium in Miami Gardens, Florida.

== Games ==
Game sites: First round (campus sites), quarterfinals, semifinals, championship

The tournament is structured as a single-elimination bracket tournament, with 12 teams playing a total of 11 games. This was the second edition of the CFP to include twelve teams and the 12th CFP since its founding. As in the previous edition, the playoff field consists of the five highest-ranked conference champions, including at least one from the Group of Six conferences (G6), and the seven remaining highest-ranked teams. However, this playoff differs from the year prior in that the top four seeds, which carry a first-round bye, are assigned to the teams ranked Nos. 1–4, rather than being assigned to the four highest-ranked conference champions. The final CFP rankings and the resulting bracket pairings were released by the committee on December 7, concluding the weekend during which most conferences hold their championship games.

The first round games were held at campus sites and hosted by the higher-ranked team in each respective matchup. The quarterfinals and semifinals were hosted by six of the 2025–26 NCAA football bowl games. These bowls, commonly known as the New Year's Six, are some of the oldest and most prestigious bowl games. The championship was a standalone game and was also played at a neutral site, Hard Rock Stadium in Miami Gardens, Florida.

=== Schedule ===
All times are Eastern Time • Schedule source

Round	Date	Time	Matchup	Game	Location	TV
First round	December 19	8:00 p.m.	Alabama 34, Oklahoma 24	First round (Campus sites)	Gaylord Family Oklahoma Memorial Stadium • Norman, Oklahoma	ESPN/ABC
First round	December 20	Noon	Miami (FL) 10, Texas A&M 3	First round (Campus sites)	Kyle Field • College Station, Texas	ESPN/ABC
First round	December 20	3:30 p.m.	Tulane 10, Ole Miss 41	First round (Campus sites)	Vaught–Hemingway Stadium • Oxford, Mississippi	TNT/TBS/TruTV/HBO Max
First round	December 20	7:30 p.m.	James Madison 34, Oregon 51	First round (Campus sites)	Autzen Stadium • Eugene, Oregon	TNT/TBS/TruTV/HBO Max
Quarterfinals	December 31	7:30 p.m.	Miami (FL) 24, Ohio State 14	Cotton Bowl Classic	AT&T Stadium • Arlington, Texas	ESPN
Quarterfinals	January 1	Noon	Oregon 23, Texas Tech 0	Orange Bowl	Hard Rock Stadium • Miami Gardens, Florida	ESPN
Quarterfinals	January 1	4:00 p.m.	Alabama 3, Indiana 38	Rose Bowl	Rose Bowl • Pasadena, California	ESPN
Quarterfinals	January 1	8:00 p.m.	Ole Miss 39, Georgia 34	Sugar Bowl	Caesars Superdome • New Orleans, Louisiana	ESPN
Semifinals	January 8	7:30 p.m.	Miami (FL) 31, Ole Miss 27	Fiesta Bowl	State Farm Stadium • Glendale, Arizona	ESPN
Semifinals	January 9	7:30 p.m.	Oregon 22, Indiana 56	Peach Bowl	Mercedes-Benz Stadium • Atlanta, Georgia	ESPN
Championship	January 19	7:30 p.m.	Miami (FL) 21, Indiana 27	National Championship	Hard Rock Stadium • Miami Gardens, Florida	ESPN

=== Bracket ===
First round
Dec 20 – Autzen Stadium
5	Oregon	51
12	James Madison	34
Dec 19 – Oklahoma Memorial Stadium
8	Oklahoma	24
9	Alabama	34
Dec 20 – Vaught–Hemingway Stadium
6	Ole Miss	41
11	Tulane	10
Dec 20 – Kyle Field
7	Texas A&M	3
10	Miami (FL)	10

Quarterfinals
Jan 1 – Orange Bowl, Hard Rock Stadium
4	Texas Tech	0
5	Oregon	23
Jan 1 – Rose Bowl, Rose Bowl
1	Indiana	38
9	Alabama	3
Jan 1 – Sugar Bowl, Caesars Superdome
3	Georgia	34
6	Ole Miss	39
Dec 31 – Cotton Bowl Classic, AT&T Stadium
2	Ohio State	14
10	Miami (FL)	24

Semifinals
Jan 9 – Peach Bowl, Mercedes-Benz Stadium
5	Oregon	22
1	Indiana	56
Jan 8 – Fiesta Bowl, State Farm Stadium
6	Ole Miss	27
10	Miami (FL)	31

Championship
Jan 19 – Hard Rock Stadium
1	Indiana	27
10	Miami (FL)	21

== Selection and teams ==
Playoff participants (teams in bold received byes to the quarterfinals)
Big Ten, SEC, ACC, Big 12, American, Sun Belt

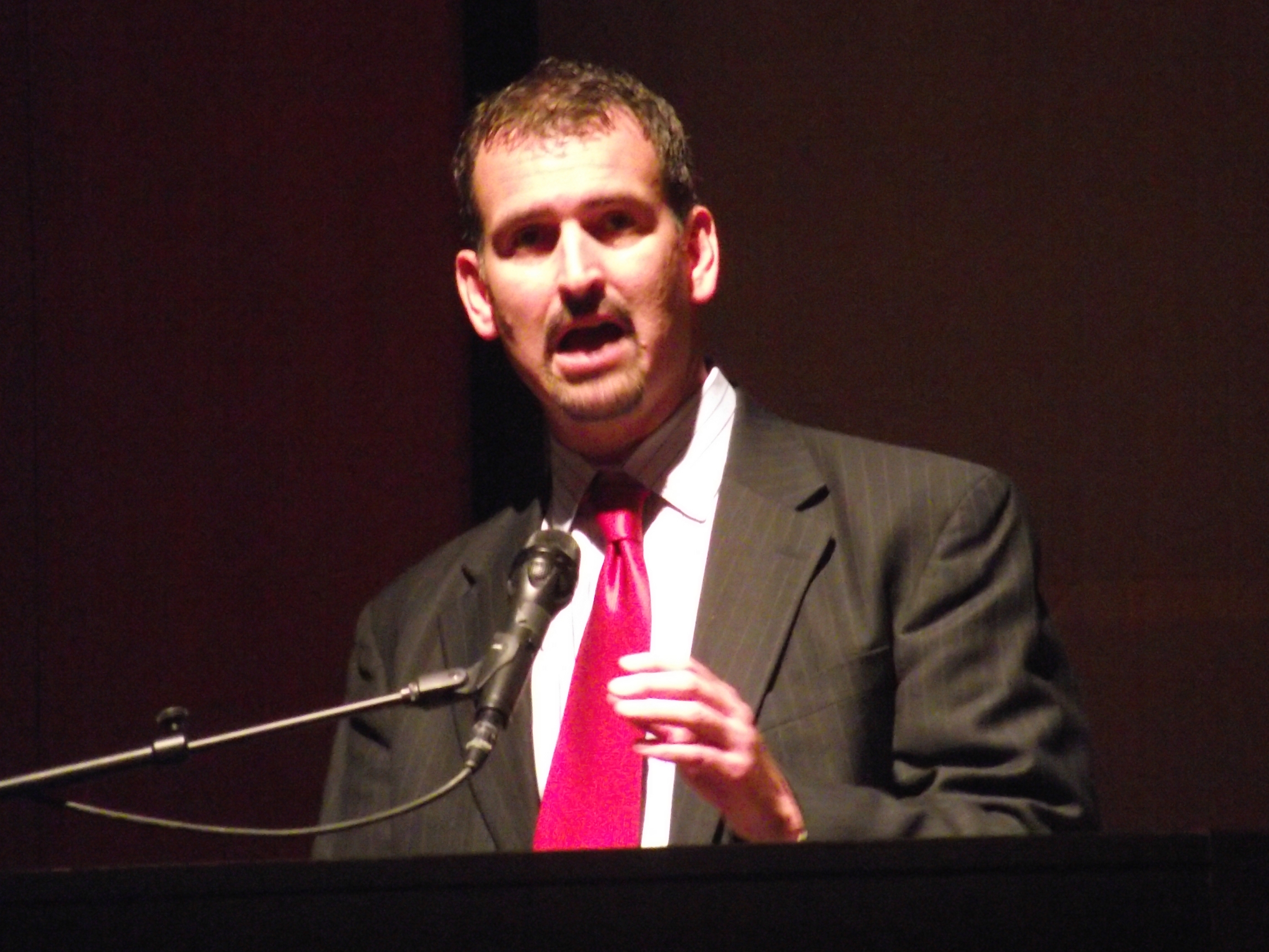
Mack Rhoades (pictured in 2011) chaired the selection committee until he stepped down on November 13.

The 2025–26 CFP selection committee was chaired by Arkansas athletic director Hunter Yurachek. Its other members were former Nevada head coach and athletic director Chris Ault, Nebraska athletic director Troy Dannen, former Cincinnati and Michigan State head coach Mark Dantonio, Utah athletic director Mark Harlan, former athletic director Jeff Long, sportswriter Ivan Maisel, Middle Tennessee athletic director Chris Massaro, former head coach Mike Riley, Miami (OH) athletic director David Sayler, former NFL player Wesley Walls, and Virginia athletic director Carla Williams. Until November 13, the committee was chaired by Baylor athletic director Mack Rhoades. He relinquished his position on the committee upon taking a leave of absence from Baylor and ultimately resigned as athletic director on November 20. Yurachek replaced Rhoades as chair and Harlan was added to the committee as the new representative from the Big 12 Conference. The thirteenth member of the committee, former college football player Randall McDaniel, stepped down on October 20 for personal reasons but announced plans to return to the committee the following year.

The first CFP rankings of the season were released on November 4, 2025. Two conferences were represented in the top six: Ohio State and Indiana, both from the Big Ten Conference, topped the initial rankings at Nos. 1 and 2, while the Southeastern Conference (SEC) was represented by the next four teams with No. 3 Texas A&M their highest-ranked. No. 7 BYU and No. 8 Texas Tech represented the Big 12 Conference and Notre Dame, an FBS independent, was ranked at No. 10. The highest-ranked team from the Atlantic Coast Conference (ACC) was No. 14 Virginia, and Memphis from the American Conference was the highest-ranked G6 team despite not being ranked in the CFP top 25. BYU fell to No. 12 in the November 11 rankings after their road loss to No. 8 Texas Tech, and No. 18 Miami (FL) rose to No. 15 after defeating Syracuse. Together with a loss by Virginia to Wake Forest, Miami became the new highest-ranked ACC team. South Florida (American) debuted in the CFP rankings at No. 24 after a win over UTSA to become the new highest-ranked G6 team.

The following week of games saw two top ten teams lose: No. 4 Alabama was upset by No. 11 Oklahoma, while No. 5 Georgia defeated No. 10 Texas. As a result, Alabama fell to No. 10 and Texas fell to No. 17 in the November 18 rankings. No. 3 Texas A&M avoided an upset loss of their own to South Carolina with a school-record comeback to win by one point after trailing by 27 points at halftime. No. 24 South Florida fell out of the rankings following their loss at home to Navy; their American Conference foe Tulane replaced them at No. 24 and became the new highest-ranked G6 team. The November 25 rankings saw few changes from the previous week; the top five teams were unchanged while Oregon jumped to No. 6 over Ole Miss after the Ducks defeated No. 15 USC. Miami (FL) rose from No. 13 to No. 12, marking the ACC's debut in the top twelve, after a win over Virginia Tech.

The penultimate CFP rankings were released on December 2. Texas A&M fell from No. 3 to No. 7 following their first loss of the season at rival No. 16 Texas; this made Georgia, who rose to No. 3, the new highest-ranked SEC team. The loss also cost Texas A&M a place in the SEC championship, which was contested instead by Georgia and No. 9 Alabama. No. 1 Ohio State and No. 2 Indiana both finished the regular season undefeated after beating No. 15 Michigan and Purdue, respectively. This ensured they would play each other in the Big Ten championship, marking the first game between Big Ten teams ranked Nos. 1 and 2 since the 2006 Michigan–Ohio State game. Texas Tech rose to No. 4 following a shutout victory over West Virginia—a game the Lubbock Avalanche-Journal called "laughable"—marking Texas Tech's first-ever top-four CFP ranking and making them the first Big 12 team of the season to be in position for a first-round bye. Ole Miss rose from No. 7 to No. 6 following their win at Mississippi State despite the departure of their head coach, Lane Kiffin, for LSU on November 30; Ole Miss defensive coordinator Pete Golding was elevated to permanent head coach.

The conference championship weekend began on December 5 with two games featuring ranked teams. No. 20 Tulane defeated No. 24 North Texas to win the American championship, making them "almost certain" to qualify for the playoff, according to CBS Sports, and the Sun Belt championship was won by No. 25 James Madison to "[keep] them alive" for the playoff, according to ESPN. The following day, No. 4 Texas Tech beat No. 11 BYU to win the Big 12 championship for the first time in school history, and Georgia defeated Alabama to win the SEC championship. Indiana defeated Ohio State to win the Big Ten championship, which CBS Sports reported "all but [secured]" the No. 1 seed for the Hoosiers. Finally, Duke upset No. 16 Virginia in the ACC championship, putting the ACC at risk of missing the playoffs altogether. In the final rankings, released on December 7, Indiana was seeded No. 1 and received a first-round bye, along with No. 2 Ohio State, No. 3 Georgia, and No. 4 Texas Tech. Oregon, Ole Miss, Texas A&M, and Oklahoma remained at their positions at Nos. 5–8 after remaining idle during conference championship weekend, though No. 9 Alabama also maintained its ranking despite a 28-7 "blowout loss" in the SEC championship, according to Yahoo! Sports. BYU fell to No. 12 following their Big 12 championship loss, and Notre Dame fell to No. 11 after being jumped by Miami (FL) despite both teams being idle the preceding week. This caused both Notre Dame and BYU to miss the playoffs as they were bumped out in favor of the final two conference champions, No. 20 Tulane and No. 24 James Madison.

Notre Dame's exclusion, in particular, sparked controversy as the Fighting Irish had led Miami in every CFP poll until the final rankings despite Miami winning the teams' head-to-head matchup on August 31. Selection committee chair Hunter Yurachek explained Miami's late jump over Notre Dame by saying that the committee had not considered the head-to-head result until the teams were side-by-side in the polls, a rationale Nick Bromberg of Yahoo! Sports called "illogical" and a "flaw" in the rankings process, while Brandon Marcello of CBS Sports opined it was "nonsensical, if not outright misleading". Numerous college football personalities praised the committee's decision for honoring the head-to-head result, while others levied criticism against the committee for ranking Miami ahead of Notre Dame despite their identical records and neither team playing a game that week. Writing for ESPN, David Hale said that selecting Miami over Notre Dame was a "sensible conclusion" but that the selection committee went through a "ridiculous process" to get there. Carter Bahns of CBS Sports said that Notre Dame's exclusion was the "biggest surprise" of the playoff field, and Liam McKeone of Sports Illustrated wrote that the Irish had been "snubbed". Because they were left out of the playoffs, Notre Dame opted to decline a bowl bid, ending their season at 10–2; No. 12 BYU accepted their invitation to the Pop-Tarts Bowl against No. 22 Georgia Tech.

2025 College Football Playoff rankings top fifteen progression
No.	Week 10 November 4	Week 11 November 11	Week 12 November 18	Week 13 November 25	Week 14 December 2	Final December 7
1	**Ohio State** (8–0)	**Ohio State** (9–0)	**Ohio State** (10–0)	**Ohio State** (11–0)	**Ohio State** (12–0)	**Indiana** (13–0)
2	Indiana (9–0)	Indiana (10–0)	Indiana (11–0)	Indiana (11–0)	Indiana (12–0)	Ohio State (12–1)
3	**Texas A&M** (8–0)	**Texas A&M** (9–0)	**Texas A&M** (10–0)	**Texas A&M** (11–0)	**Georgia** (11–1)	**Georgia** (12–1)
4	Alabama (7–1)	Alabama (8–1)	Georgia (9–1)	Georgia (10–1)	**Texas Tech** (11–1)	**Texas Tech** (12–1)
5	Georgia (7–1)	Georgia (8–1)	**Texas Tech** (10–1)	**Texas Tech** (10–1)	Oregon (11–1)	Oregon (11–1)
6	Ole Miss (8–1)	**Texas Tech** (9–1)	Ole Miss (10–1)	Oregon (10–1)	Ole Miss (11–1)	Ole Miss (11–1)
7	**BYU** (8–0)	Ole Miss (9–1)	Oregon (9–1)	Ole Miss (10–1)	Texas A&M (11–1)	Texas A&M (11–1)
8	Texas Tech (8–1)	Oregon (8–1)	Oklahoma (8–2)	Oklahoma (9–2)	Oklahoma (10–2)	Oklahoma (10–2)
9	Oregon (7–1)	Notre Dame (7–2)	Notre Dame (8–2)	Notre Dame (9–2)	Alabama (10–2)	Alabama (10–3)
10	Notre Dame (6–2)	Texas (7–2)	Alabama (8–2)	Alabama (9–2)	Notre Dame (10–2)	Miami (FL) (10–2)
11	Texas (7–2)	Oklahoma (7–2)	BYU (9–1)	BYU (10–1)	BYU (11–1)	Notre Dame (10–2)
12	Oklahoma (7–2)	BYU (8–1)	Utah (8–2)	**Miami (FL)** (9–2)	**Miami (FL)** (10–2)	BYU (11–2)
13	Utah (7–2)	Utah (7–2)	**Miami (FL)** (8–2)	Utah (9–2)	Texas (9–3)	Texas (9–3)
14	**Virginia** (8–1)	Vanderbilt (8–2)	Vanderbilt (8–2)	Vanderbilt (9–2)	Vanderbilt (10–2)	Vanderbilt (10–2)
15	Louisville (7–1)	**Miami (FL)** (7–2)	USC (8–2)	Michigan (9–2)	Utah (10–2)	Utah (10–2)
G6	**Memphis** (8–1)	No. 24 **South Florida** (7–2)	No. 24 **Tulane** (8–2)	No. 24 **Tulane** (9–2)	No. 20 **Tulane** (10–2)	No. 20 **Tulane** (11–2); No. 24 **James Madison** (12–1)

Key
Teams in **boldface** were leading their conference at time of rankings release (or conference winners in the case of the final rankings).
The five highest-ranked conference champions, including at least one from the Group of Six conferences, were selected.
The cutoff line represents the threshold of the top 12 teams as ranked by the CFP poll.
- A team ranked lower than 12 may still qualify, if it is one of the five highest-ranked conference champions.
- If that occurs, then that will displace the lowest ranked team in the top 12 that is not a conference champion.
Teams listed as "G6" would be in position to qualify as the highest-ranked Group of Six conference leader(s) but were not in the top fifteen teams.
- In the November 4 rankings, Memphis filled this position despite not being ranked in the top 25.
Denotes teams who rose in the rankings compared to the previous week.
Denotes teams who fell in the rankings compared to the previous week.
Denotes teams who were not ranked the previous week.
Denotes teams whose rankings or conference championship victory resulted in a berth for the College Football Playoff.

=== Playoff participants ===
Team	Conference	Record	Qualification method	College Football Playoff		
Team	Conference	Record	Qualification method	Appearance	Last bid	Result of last appearance
Alabama	Southeastern Conference	10–3 (7–1)	At-large	9th	2023	Lost to Michigan in the semifinals
Georgia	Southeastern Conference	12–1 (7–1)	Conference champion	5th	2024	Lost to Notre Dame in the quarterfinals
Indiana	Big Ten Conference	13–0 (9–0)	Conference champion	2nd	2024	Lost to Notre Dame in the first round
James Madison	Sun Belt Conference	12–1 (8–0)	Conference champion	First appearance		
Miami (FL)	Atlantic Coast Conference	10–2 (6–2)	At-large	First appearance		
Ohio State	Big Ten Conference	12–1 (9–0)	At-large	7th	2024	**Defeated Notre Dame in National Championship**
Oklahoma	Southeastern Conference	10–2 (6–2)	At-large	5th	2019	Lost to LSU in the semifinals
Ole Miss	Southeastern Conference	11–1 (7–1)	At-large	First appearance		
Oregon	Big Ten Conference	11–1 (8–1)	At-large	3rd	2024	Lost to Ohio State in the quarterfinals
Texas A&M	Southeastern Conference	11–1 (7–1)	At-large	First appearance		
Texas Tech	Big 12 Conference	12–1 (8–1)	Conference champion	First appearance		
Tulane	American Conference	11–2 (7–1)	Conference champion	First appearance		

== Game summaries ==
=== First round ===
The first round included two games that were rematches of regular-season contests: Oklahoma vs. Alabama (Oklahoma defeated Alabama, 23–21, on November 15) and Ole Miss vs. Tulane (Ole Miss defeated Tulane, 45–10, on September 20).

==== Alabama at Oklahoma ====
CFP First Round: Alabama at Oklahoma

Quarter	1	2	3	4	Total
(9) No. 9 Alabama	0	17	10	7	34
(8) No. 8 Oklahoma	10	7	0	7	24

at Gaylord Family Oklahoma Memorial Stadium • Norman, Oklahoma

- Date: December 19, 2025
- Game time: 7:00 p.m. CST
- Game weather: Sunny, 56 °F (13 °C), wind 20 mph (32 km/h) north
- Game attendance: 83,550
- Referee: Kole Knueppel (Big Ten)
- TV announcers (ESPN/ABC): Chris Fowler, Kirk Herbstreit, Holly Rowe, and Laura Rutledge
- ESPN box score / Official game book

The CFP began with the first round game between No. 9 Alabama and No. 8 Oklahoma. It marked the ninth all-time meeting between the two teams; Oklahoma entered leading the series 5–1–2. The Crimson Tide led 2–1 in New Year's Six meetings (including a win in the 2018 CFP Orange Bowl semifinal), though Oklahoma had won both prior matchups since joining the SEC. The game marked Alabama's ninth CFP appearance and Oklahoma's fifth.

Oklahoma quickly took a 17–0 lead following a punt on their opening drive with a field goal by Tate Sandell and touchdowns by John Mateer and Isaiah Sategna III on their next three. Alabama punted on their first three drives and opened their scoring with a touchdown pass from Ty Simpson to Lotzeir Brooks. After forcing another Oklahoma punt, Crimson Tide placekicker Connor Talty made a 35-yard field goal to bring Alabama within seven points. On Oklahoma's ensuing drive, Mateer's pass was intercepted by Zabien Brown, who returned it for a touchdown, tying the game at 17 following Talty's PAT.

As in the first half, each team punted on their respective opening drives of the second half. Alabama took their first lead of the contest on a 30-yard Simpson-to-Brooks touchdown pass, and they increased their lead to ten points via a 40-yard Talty field goal on their next drive after holding Oklahoma to a punt. A touchdown pass from Mateer to Deion Burks on the second play of the fourth quarter narrowed the Sooners' deficit back to three points. The teams traded punts before Alabama scored on a 6-yard Daniel Hill rush with 7:24 remaining in the game. Oklahoma drove to the Alabama 18-yard line but Sandell's 36-yard field goal attempt was unsuccessful. The Sooners forced an Alabama punt, but Sandell missed another field goal, and the Crimson Tide secured a ten-point win. After trailing by 17 points, Alabama's comeback tied the CFP record for the largest overcome deficit, and the win marked Alabama's first double-digit comeback under head coach Kalen DeBoer.

==== Miami (FL) at Texas A&M ====
CFP First Round: Miami (FL) at Texas A&M

Quarter	1	2	3	4	Total
(10) No. 10 Miami (FL)	0	0	3	7	10
(7) No. 7 Texas A&M	0	0	0	3	3

at Kyle Field • College Station, Texas

- Date: December 20, 2025
- Game time: 11:00 a.m. CST
- Game weather: Sunny, 68 °F (20 °C), wind 14 mph (23 km/h) southwest
- Game attendance: 104,122
- Referee: Michael VanderVelde (Big 12)
- TV announcers (ESPN/ABC): Sean McDonough, Greg McElroy, Molly McGrath, and Taylor McGregor
- ESPN box score / Official game book

No. 10 Miami (FL) and No. 7 Texas A&M both made their CFP debuts in the first game of the first round tripleheader. This contest marked their sixth all-time meeting and their first since 2023; Miami entered leading the series 3–2.

Texas A&M began the game with the ball and drove to the Miami 38-yard line but a false start penalty prompted a punt. Miami similarly punted on each of their first two drives with a fumble by A&M's Marcel Reed in between. After another punt by each team to begin the second quarter, a 22-yard field goal attempt by A&M placekicker Jared Zirkel was blocked. The teams traded punts again before a missed 47-yard field goal attempt by Miami's Carter Davis. Texas A&M turned the ball over on downs near midfield with under two minutes to play, and the half ended 0–0 following another missed field goal by Davis. The game was the first in CFP history to be scoreless at halftime.

Miami broke the deadlock on their first drive with a 21-yard field goal by Davis to take a 3–0 lead. Reed was intercepted by Bryce Fitzgerald on the Aggies' ensuing drive; the ball was returned to the Texas A&M 20-yard line but Miami finished the possession with another missed field goal by Davis, from 35 yards. After, each team punted before Texas A&M concluded a 16-play drive with a 35-yard field goal by Randy Bond, tying the game with eight minutes remaining. The Aggies quickly regained possession by forcing a fumble on a pass from Carson Beck to Malachi Toney at their own 47-yard line, but they suffered two sacks on their next possession and punted with under four minutes to play. Miami scored the game's first touchdown two minutes later on an 11-yard rush by Toney. Texas A&M, trailing by seven, ended their final drive when Reed's pass was intercepted by Fitzgerald in the end zone, sealing a Miami victory.

==== Tulane at Ole Miss ====
CFP First Round: Tulane at Ole Miss

Quarter	1	2	3	4	Total
(11) No. 20 Tulane	0	3	0	7	10
(6) No. 6 Ole Miss	14	3	10	14	41

at Vaught–Hemingway Stadium • Oxford, Mississippi

- Date: December 20, 2025
- Game time: 2:30 p.m. CST
- Game weather: Sunny, 65 °F (18 °C), wind 9 mph (14 km/h) south
- Game attendance: 68,251
- Referee: Adam Savoie (ACC)
- TV announcers (TNT/TBS/TruTV/HBO Max): Joe Tessitore, Jesse Palmer, Katie George, and Quint Kessenich
- ESPN box score / Official game book

No. 20 Tulane (the 11 seed) and No. 6 Ole Miss both made their CFP debuts in the second game of the opening round tripleheader. Ole Miss entered leading the series 44–28; (Note: Wins by Ole Miss over Tulane in 2010 and 2012 were later vacated, and a Tulane win in 1983 was later awarded to Ole Miss via forfeit.) the game was the 75th all-time and the first postseason meeting between the teams.

Ole Miss began the game with a three-play touchdown drive culminating in a 20-yard Kewan Lacy rush. Tulane's opening drive reached the Ole Miss 23-yard line but was cut short by a Jaylon Braxton interception. The Rebels doubled their lead four plays later on a 4-yard Trinidad Chambliss touchdown rush. The Green Wave turned the ball over on downs but forced an Ole Miss three-and-out before scoring their first points on a 39-yard field goal by Patrick Durkin. Each team then punted once, and Ole Miss restored their 14-point lead with a 42-yard Lucas Carneiro field goal. Following a Tulane three-and-out resulting in a punt, Ole Miss drove to the Tulane 17-yard line before a fumble by Austin Simmons, who was in the game at quarterback following an injury to Chambliss. Tulane was unable to score in the fifteen seconds that remained and the game went to halftime with Ole Miss leading 17–3.

Tulane reached the Ole Miss 43-yard line to begin the second half but stalled and punted. Ole Miss extended their lead to 17 points on their ensuing drive, which they capped with a 13-yard touchdown pass from Chambliss to De'Zhaun Stribling. The Rebels forced two turnovers on downs and two fumbles on the succeeding four Tulane drives and built on their lead with a 48-yard Carneiro field goal and rushing touchdowns by Logan Diggs and Chambliss. The Rebels punted it back to Tulane with six minutes remaining, after which the Green Wave scored their first touchdown on a 29-yard pass from Jake Retzlaff to Justyn Reid. The game ended on Ole Miss's next possession as the Rebels ran out the clock to secure a 31-point win.

==== James Madison at Oregon ====
CFP First Round: James Madison at Oregon

Quarter	1	2	3	4	Total
(12) No. 24 James Madison	3	3	14	14	34
(5) No. 5 Oregon	13	21	14	3	51

at Autzen Stadium • Eugene, Oregon

- Date: December 20, 2025
- Game time: 4:30 p.m. PST
- Game weather: Cloudy, 46 °F (8 °C), wind 4 mph (6.4 km/h) southeast
- Game attendance: 55,124
- Referee: Kyle Olson (SEC)
- TV announcers (TNT/TBS/TruTV/HBO Max): Bob Wischusen, Louis Riddick, Kris Budden, and Stormy Buonantony
- ESPN box score / Official game book

No. 24 James Madison, the 12 seed, and No. 5 Oregon concluded the CFP first round. The teams met for the first time; James Madison made their CFP debut while Oregon made their third appearance.

Oregon opened the scoring with a 41-yard pass from Dante Moore to Jamari Johnson on the game's fourth play, though their two-point conversion attempt was unsuccessful, leaving the score 6–0. James Madison's opening drive spanned 15 plays and concluded with a 30-yard Morgan Suarez field goal, though Oregon's lead grew to ten points five plays later on a 5-yard Moore touchdown rush. After an unsuccessful field goal attempt by Suarez, the Ducks added touchdowns on each of their next three possessions on a Dierre Hill rush and two passes by Moore, to Jeremiah McClellan and Malik Benson. The Dukes punted three times before scoring again on a 38-yard Suarez field goal with six seconds left in the quarter, making Oregon's halftime lead 34–6.

James Madison opened the second half with their first touchdown drive of the game, scoring on a 47-yard pass from Alonza Barnett to Nick DeGennaro, though Oregon responded with a 45-yard Moore-to-Benson touchdown pass four plays later. Several drives later, a James Madison punt was blocked by Blake Purchase and returned for an Oregon touchdown by Jayden Limar. Later in the third quarter, Moore was intercepted by Justin Eaglin, leading to a Dukes touchdown on a pass from Barnett to George Pettaway. Following an Oregon punt, James Madison began the fourth quarter with a touchdown drive ending with a 2-yard rush by Lacota Dippre, though their two-point try was unsuccessful. Oregon's final score of the game came on a 48-yard field goal by Atticus Sappington, while James Madison's came on a 1-yard Barnett rush to cap their next drive. The Ducks then recovered the onside kick and ran out the clock for the win.

=== Quarterfinals ===
The quarterfinals had one rematch from the regular season: Ole Miss vs. Georgia (Georgia defeated Ole Miss, 43–35, on October 18).

==== Cotton Bowl Classic ====
2025 Cotton Bowl Classic

Quarter	1	2	3	4	Total
(10) No. 10 Miami (FL)	0	14	3	7	24
(2) No. 2 Ohio State	0	0	7	7	14

at AT&T Stadium • Arlington, Texas

- Date: December 31, 2025
- Game time: 6:30 p.m. CST
- Game weather: n/a (indoor stadium)
- Game attendance: 71,323
- Referee: Daniel Gautreaux (SEC)
- TV announcers (ESPN): Dave Pasch, Dusty Dvoracek, Taylor McGregor, and Quint Kessenich
- ESPN box score / Official game book

The CFP quarterfinals began on New Year's Eve with the Cotton Bowl Classic between No. 10 Miami and No. 2 Ohio State. This was the teams' sixth meeting—they each entered with two wins. (Note: Ohio State's win over Miami (FL) in 2010 was vacated.) Their lone prior postseason meeting was a 31–24 Buckeyes upset victory in the 2003 Fiesta Bowl, that year's BCS national championship game, though Miami won their last matchup in 2011. The game marked Ohio State's seventh playoff appearance—they were the defending national champions—and their fourth appearance in the Cotton Bowl. It was Miami's second Cotton Bowl.

Both teams opened the game with a punt, and Miami's second drive was cut short in the Ohio State red zone following a Mark Fletcher Jr. fumble. After an Ohio State punt, Miami scored the game's first points on a touchdown pass from Carson Beck to Fletcher. They doubled their lead after Keionte Scott intercepted a Julian Sayin pass and returned it 72 yards for a touchdown with 12 minutes remaining in the half. Each team punted twice over the next nine minutes. Ohio State resumed possession at their own 2-yard line with 1:30 to play and drove to the Miami 31-yard line, but Jayden Fielding's 49 yard field goal attempt was unsuccessful.

Ohio State received the ball to begin the second half, and they drove 82 yards to score their first points on a 1-yard Bo Jackson rush. Miami's ensuing drive reached the Ohio State 32-yard line in eight plays; following a fumble by Malachi Toney which was recovered by the Hurricanes, Carter Davis made a 49-yard field goal to increase Miami's lead to ten points. Ohio State drove 58 yards to the Miami 22-yard line before the third quarter ended, and they scored three plays later on a 14-yard pass from Sayin to Jeremiah Smith. Both teams punted once before Miami extended their lead to ten points on a 5-yard rush by CharMar Brown with under a minute remaining in the game. Sayin was intercepted on the second play of Ohio State's ensuing possession, allowing Miami to secure a 24–14 victory.

==== Orange Bowl ====
2026 Orange Bowl

Quarter	1	2	3	4	Total
(5) No. 5 Oregon	3	3	7	10	23
(4) No. 4 Texas Tech	0	0	0	0	0

at Hard Rock Stadium • Miami Gardens, Florida

- Date: January 1, 2026
- Game time: Noon EST
- Game weather: Sunny, 64 °F (18 °C), no wind
- Game attendance: 65,021
- Referee: Jerry Magallanes (ACC)
- TV announcers (ESPN): Joe Tessitore, Jesse Palmer, Katie George, and Stormy Buonantony
- ESPN box score / Official game book

The first New Year's Day quarterfinal game was the Orange Bowl between No. 5 Oregon and No. 4 Texas Tech. This was the teams' fourth meeting; Oregon had won each of the previous three, most recently in 2023. The game marked Oregon's third CFP appearance and both teams' first appearance in the Orange Bowl.

Oregon concluded their first drive with a score on a 50-yard field goal by Atticus Sappington. They reached the Texas Tech 23-yard line on their second drive but turned the ball over on downs. Texas Tech went three-and-out on each of their first two drives; following Oregon's first punt early in the second quarter, Behren Morton's pass was intercepted by Brandon Finney Jr. at the Texas Tech 33-yard line. The Red Raiders later drove to the Oregon 33-yard line but Stone Harrington's 54-yard field goal attempt was unsuccessful. A fumble by Cameron Dickey gave Oregon the ball on the Texas Tech 29-yard line with two minutes remaining, and the Ducks finished that possession with a 39-yard Sappington field goal to lead 6–0.

Texas Tech fumbled for the second time early in the third quarter; the ball was recovered by Matayo Uiagalelei and Oregon scored one play later on a Jordon Davison rush. Three of Texas Tech's final four drives ended with a turnover on downs, with the exception coming on another interception by Finney, this time in the end zone, with 13:42 remaining in the fourth quarter. An Oregon drive late in the third ended when Dante Moore pass was intercepted by Ben Roberts, after which the Ducks scored on two of their final three drives. Their possession stemming from the last Finney interception resulted in a 43-yard Sappington field goal, though Sappington missed a 36-yard kick on the next drive. With ten seconds remaining, Davison rushed for a 1-yard touchdown to push Oregon's lead to the eventual final score of 23–0. The game was the first CFP shutout since Clemson defeated Ohio State, 31–0, in the 2016 Fiesta Bowl semifinal.

==== Rose Bowl ====
2026 Rose Bowl

Quarter	1	2	3	4	Total
(9) No. 9 Alabama	0	0	3	0	3
(1) No. 1 Indiana	0	17	7	14	38

at the Rose Bowl • Pasadena, California

- Date: January 1, 2026
- Game time: 1:00 p.m. PST
- Game weather: Cloudy, 60 °F (16 °C), wind 3 mph (4.8 km/h) southwest
- Game attendance: 90,278
- Referee: Kevin Mar (Big 12)
- TV announcers (ESPN): Chris Fowler, Kirk Herbstreit, Holly Rowe, and Kris Budden
- ESPN box score / Official game book

The third game of the CFP quarterfinals matched No. 9 Alabama and No. 1 Indiana. The game was the first between the two programs. It marked Indiana's second CFP appearance and their first Rose Bowl Game since 1968, while Alabama returned to the Rose Bowl two years after their 2023–24 CFP semifinal loss to Michigan.

After a punt by each team, Indiana drove 84 yards over nine minutes and took the lead on a 31-yard Nico Radicic field goal on the first play of the second quarter. Following an Alabama turnover on downs, the Hoosiers extended their lead to ten points on a touchdown pass from Fernando Mendoza to Charlie Becker. The teams traded punts before a Ty Simpson fumble at the Indiana 42-yard line gave the Hoosiers the ball with three minutes remaining in the half. Indiana's ensuing possession resulted in a 1-yard touchdown pass from Mendoza to Omar Cooper, pushing Indiana to a 17–0 halftime lead.

The Indiana defense forced an Alabama three-and-out to begin the second half before responding on offense with a 24-yard passing touchdown from Mendoza to Elijah Sarratt. Simpson exited with an elbow injury before Alabama's next drive; he was replaced by Austin Mack, who led the Crimson Tide to the Indiana 10-yard line, where Conor Talty made a 28-yard field goal. The Hoosiers extended their lead on touchdown rushes of 25 and 18 yards by Kaelon Black and Roman Hemby, respectively. Alabama reached the Indiana 26-yard line on their final drive but failed to convert 4th & 4, resulting in a turnover on downs with 5:35 to play. From there, Indiana ran out the remaining time to seal a 35-point quarterfinal victory. It was the Hoosiers' first bowl win since the 1991 Copper Bowl against Baylor and simultaneously the Crimson Tide's biggest margin of defeat in a postseason game surpassing the 38–6 loss to repeating national champion Nebraska in the 1972 Orange Bowl.

==== Sugar Bowl ====
2026 Sugar Bowl

Quarter	1	2	3	4	Total
(6) No. 6 Ole Miss	6	6	7	20	39
(3) No. 3 Georgia	0	21	3	10	34

at Caesars Superdome • New Orleans, Louisiana

- Date: January 1, 2026
- Game time: 7:00 p.m. CST
- Game weather: n/a (indoor stadium)
- Game attendance: 68,371
- Referee: Jeff Servinski (Big Ten)
- TV announcers (ESPN): Sean McDonough, Greg McElroy, Molly McGrath, and Laura Rutledge
- ESPN box score / Official game book

The quarterfinals concluded with the Sugar Bowl matching No. 6 Ole Miss and No. 3 Georgia. It was the teams' 50th meeting and first in the postseason; Georgia entered with a 34–13–1 overall series lead. (Note: Ole Miss's win over Georgia in 2016 was vacated.) It was Ole Miss's 11th Sugar Bowl and Georgia's 12th, and it was the first Sugar Bowl with two SEC teams since 1964.

Each team's opening drive ended with a punt, and Ole Miss scored first with Lucas Carneiro field goals of 55 and 56 yards, respectively, on their following two drives. After a second Georgia punt, the Bulldogs scored on a 12-yard Gunner Stockton touchdown rush early in the second quarter. Ole Miss retook the lead with a 3-yard touchdown pass from Trinidad Chambliss to Luke Hasz on the eighth play of their ensuing drive, and Georgia responded with a 12-play scoring drive over the following six and a half minutes which ended with another Stockton touchdown rush. The Georgia lead grew to nine points on Ole Miss's next drive as the result of a Kewan Lacy fumble, which was returned by Daylen Everette for a touchdown with 2:34 remaining in the half. No scoring took place on the final three possessions of the half, and Georgia entered halftime leading 21–12.

A Georgia punt and an Ole Miss turnover on downs began the third quarter, after which Georgia drove to the Rebels' 37-yard line but failed to score after Peyton Woodring's 55-yard field goal attempt was missed. The next three possessions all resulted in scoring: Georgia added a 37-yard Woodring field goal and Lacy rushed for touchdowns of 7 and 6 yards for Ole Miss. The Rebels opted to attempt a two-point conversion after the second Lacy score, which they converted on a pass from Chambliss to Harrison Wallace III, giving them a 27–24 lead. Following a Georgia turnover on downs at their own 23-yard line, Ole Miss scored in one play on a pass from Chambliss to Dae'Quan Wright to further extend their lead to ten points. Georgia scored on a pass from Stockton to Zachariah Branch two minutes later and forced an Ole Miss three-and-out to retake possession with 5:26 left in the game. They drove to the Ole Miss 6-yard line and tied the game at 34 on a 24-yard Woodring field goal. Ole Miss's final possession finished with a 47-yard Carneiro field goal, giving Ole Miss a three-point lead with six seconds left. On the ensuing kickoff return, a Georgia lateral hit the pylon, resulting in a safety and giving Ole Miss a 39–34 victory.

=== Semifinals ===
The semifinals will have one rematch from the regular season: Oregon vs. Indiana (Indiana defeated Oregon, 30–20, on October 11). All four head coaches in the semifinals were assistant coaches for Nick Saban at Alabama between 2007-2021 and were a part of National Championship winning teams.

==== Fiesta Bowl ====
2026 Fiesta Bowl

Quarter	1	2	3	4	Total
(10) No. 10 Miami (FL)	3	14	0	14	31
(6) No. 6 Ole Miss	0	13	3	11	27

at State Farm Stadium • Glendale, Arizona

- Date: January 8, 2026
- Game time: 5:30 p.m. MST
- Game weather: n/a (indoor stadium)
- Game attendance: 67,928
- Referee: Rod Snodgrass (Big Ten)
- TV announcers (ESPN): Chris Fowler, Kirk Herbstreit, Holly Rowe, and Laura Rutledge
- ESPN box score / Official game book

The first semifinal game was No. 10 Miami vs. No. 6 Ole Miss at the Fiesta Bowl. This was their fourth meeting and their first since 1951; Ole Miss led the series 2–1.

The first quarter contained only one score, a 38-yard Carter Davis field goal on Miami's first drive of the game. Both of Ole Miss's first two drives ended with a three-and-out, though a 73-yard Kewan Lacy rush on the second play of their third drive gave the Rebels a 7–3 lead. The teams traded scoring drives for much of the remainder of the second quarter. After Ole Miss's two-play touchdown drive, Miami drove 75 yards in 15 plays and scored on a CharMar Brown touchdown rush. The Rebels then tied the game at 10 points apiece on a 42-yard Lucas Carneiro field goal, though Miami reestablished a seven-point lead on a 52-yard touchdown pass from Beck to Keelan Marion with 2:18 remaining in the half. Following a punt by each team, Carneiro made a 58-yard field goal with eleven seconds left and Miami took a 17–13 lead into halftime.

Both teams missed a 51-yard field goal on their respective first drives of the second half. A 13-play Miami drive was cut short when Carson Beck's pass was intercepted by Kapena Gushiken at the Ole Miss 14-yard line; the Rebels then drove from that spot to the Miami 37-yard line, where Carneiro made a 54-yard field goal to narrow the Hurricanes' lead to one point. After a Miami punt, Carneiro gave Ole Miss the lead with a 21-yard field goal with seven minutes remaining. A 17-yard Mark Fletcher run on the second play of Miami's ensuing drive set up a 36-yard touchdown pass from Beck to Toney, giving Miami a 24–19 lead with 5:04 to play in the game. A pass interference penalty on Ja'Boree Antoine extended Ole Miss's next possession, and the Rebels scored on a 24-yard touchdown pass from Trinidad Chambliss to Dae'Quan Wright with three minutes left. Up by one point, they went for two and scored on a Chambliss pass to Caleb Odom. Miami's final drive was 15 plays and ended with a 3-yard touchdown run by Beck, giving Miami a 31–27 lead with 18 seconds left that held to give Miami a championship berth.

==== Peach Bowl ====
2026 Peach Bowl

Quarter	1	2	3	4	Total
(5) No. 5 Oregon	7	0	8	7	22
(1) No. 1 Indiana	14	21	7	14	56

at Mercedes-Benz Stadium • Atlanta, Georgia

- Date: January 9, 2026
- Game time: 7:30 p.m. EST
- Game weather: n/a (indoor stadium)
- Game attendance: 75,604
- Referee: Daniel Gautreaux (SEC)
- TV announcers (ESPN): Sean McDonough, Greg McElroy, Katie George, and Molly McGrath
- ESPN box score / Official game book

The Peach Bowl between No. 5 Oregon and No. 1 Indiana concluded the semifinals. This was their fifth meeting—Oregon won the first two and Indiana had won the last two.

Indiana scored on the game's first play when Dante Moore's pass was intercepted by D'Angelo Ponds and returned 25 yards for a touchdown. The teams then exchanged offensive touchdowns: Oregon's 19-yard pass from Moore to Jamari Johnson, and Indiana's 8-yard pass from Fernando Mendoza to Omar Cooper. Early in the second quarter, Moore fumbled at his own 7-yard line and the ball was recovered at the 3-yard line by Indiana's Mario Landino. This was the first of four consecutive scoreless drives to end the first half for Oregon and was followed by a punt, another fumble, and an unsuccessful 56-yard field goal attempt by Atticus Sappington. Indiana's final three drives before halftime all ended in touchdowns: a 1-yard Kaelon Black rush, and passes by Fernando Mendoza to Charlie Becker (36 yards) and Elijah Sarratt (2 yards). Indiana led 35–7 at halftime.

Indiana received the ball to begin the second half and scored their fourth straight touchdown, a 13-yard pass from Mendoza to E.J. Williams Jr. Following a 71-yard rush by Dierre Hill on Oregon's first play of the half, Jay Harris scored on a 2-yard rush. Moore then passed to Johnson to complete the two-point conversion. A scoreless period of about nine minutes followed during which Indiana punted twice and Oregon punted once and had a turnover on downs at the Indiana 31-yard line. From there, the Hoosiers scored in five plays and finished with a 23-yard rush by Black. A 1-yard touchdown pass from Moore to Roger Saleapaga with 22 seconds left completed Oregon's final drive, and Indiana took a knee one play later to finish a 56–22 semifinal win and secure a championship game berth.

=== Championship ===
2026 College Football Playoff National Championship

Quarter	1	2	3	4	Total
(10) No. 10 Miami (FL)	0	0	7	14	21
(1) No. 1 Indiana	3	7	7	10	27

at Hard Rock Stadium • Miami Gardens, Florida

- Date: January 19, 2026
- Game time: 7:30 p.m. EST
- Game weather: Cloudy, 61 °F (16 °C), wind 11 mph (18 km/h) north
- Referee: Michael VanderVelde (Big 12)
- TV announcers (ESPN): Chris Fowler, Kirk Herbstreit, Holly Rowe, and Molly McGrath
- ESPN box score / Statbroadcast.com

The 2026 CFP National Championship marks the third all-time meeting between No. 10 Miami and No. 1 Indiana, and the first time the two teams have played since 1966. The all-time series is split at one win apiece.

Hard Rock Stadium, the venue for the game, is also Miami's home stadium, which they share with the Miami Dolphins of the NFL. The Hurricanes were designated as the visiting team because Indiana is the higher seed and therefore automatically the designated home team.
