= Thomas Ford =

Thomas or Tom Ford may refer to:

== People ==
=== Arts and entertainment ===
- Thomas Ford (architect) (1891–1971), British architect
- Thomas Ford (composer) (c. 1580–1648), English composer, lutenist, and viol player
- Tom Ford (born 1961), American designer
- Tom Ford (presenter) (born 1977), British television presenter
- Thomas Mikal Ford (1964–2016), American actor

=== Politics ===
- Thomas Ford (politician) (1800–1850), Governor of Illinois from 1842 to 1846
- Thomas F. Ford (1873–1958), California politician
- Thomas Gardner Ford (1918–1995), Member of the Michigan House of Representatives
- Thomas H. Ford (1814–1868), American politician in Ohio

=== Religion ===
- Thomas Ford (martyr) (fl. 1567–1582), English martyr
- Thomas Ford (minister) (1598–1674), English nonconformist minister

=== Sports ===
- Thomas Ford (American football), American football coach
- Tom Ford (athletic director), American athletic director
- Tom Ford (baseball) (1866–1917), American baseball pitcher
- Thomas Ford (rower) (born 1992), British rower
- Tom Ford (snooker player) (born 1983), English snooker player
- Tom Ford (squash player) (born 1993), British squash player

== Other uses ==
- "Tom Ford" (song), a 2013 song by Jay-Z

== See also ==
- Tommy Ford (disambiguation)
