= Tommy Ford =

Tommy Ford may refer to:

- Thomas Mikal Ford (1964–2016), American actor also credited as Tommy Ford
- Tommy Ford (skier) (born 1989), American alpine ski racer
- Tommy Ford (Canadian football) (born c. 1927), Canadian football player
- Tommy Ford (American football), American football player

== See also ==
- Thomas Ford (disambiguation)
