= Shasta (mascot) =

Mascot of University of Houston teams

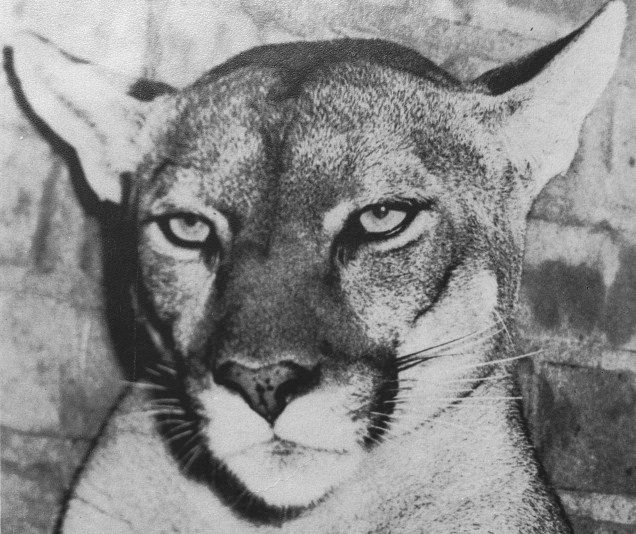
- Shasta I, ca. 1952
- University: University of Houston
- Conference: Big 12
- Description: Live/anthropomorphic cougar
- Origin of name: Student contest
- First seen: 1947
- Related mascot(s): Sasha

Shasta is the mascot of the University of Houston athletics teams, the Houston Cougars. The name "Shasta" refers to both a live and an anthropomorphic costumed cougar mascot.

== History ==
The origin of Shasta dates back to 1927 when John R. Bender, a former head football coach of the Washington State Cougars came to Houston. Because of his fondness for the animal, Bender decided it would be the name of his new team. Later that year, the school newspaper actively used the name, and other student organizations followed.

In 1946, the cougar was named the official mascot by the University of Houston as it became involved in intercollegiate sports. The next year, the Alpha Phi Omega fraternity raised funds to purchase a live cougar for the university, and held a contest to name it. Among 225 other entries, student Joe Randol won the contest with the following submission: "Shasta (She has to). Shasta have a cage, Shasta have a keeper, Shasta have a winning ball club, Shasta have the best." The first runner-up was "Raguoc" (cougar spelled backwards).

From 1947 until 1989 a live cougar mascot was used. However, from 1989 until 2012, Shasta existed as only a costumed mascot. Although a current live mascot was adopted by the university through a partnership with the Houston Zoo, costumed students portraying Shasta & Sasha are still used for game appearances.

== Live mascots ==
=== Shasta I ===
Shasta I (1947–1962) was the longest serving Shasta. She was purchased in Mexico during the fall semester of 1947 by members of the Alpha Phi Omega fraternity. Student caretakers of Shasta were known as the "Cougar Guard", and were responsible for bringing the cougar to the football team's away games among other activities.

In 1953, while being transported to Austin for a game against University of Texas, a toe of her front paw was severed after being caught in a cage door. University of Texas students learned of the injury and mocked University of Houston players by folding their thumbs over their ring fingers as to imitate the injury. This sign was later adopted by UH students as a symbol of school pride, now known as the Cougar Paw.

Following her service as the University of Houston mascot, she resided at the Houston Zoo.

=== Shasta II ===
Shasta II (1962–1965) was the shortest serving Shasta, and was the first to live in "Shasta's Den" (a cage built for her) at the southwest corner of Lynn Eusan Park. It is said that she was retired so soon due to an unruly attitude. She later resided at the Houston Zoo.

=== Shasta III ===
Shasta III (1965–1977) was also known as "The Lady". She was featured in several commercials for the American Motors Corporation, but was forced to retire due to poor health.

Shasta III was known by her keepers (The Cougar Guard) as "Mama". She was at the university until at least 1980 or 1981. She was retired from games after Shasta IV was purchased, and was kept in a different room of the on-campus cage/building from Shasta III. IV was purchased when III got very sick (she was expected to die then, but she recovered and lived a few years longer). IV was purchased as a young cub and was initially easy to handle by the guard members at that time, but she became more and more difficult as those members left the guard or graduated. It was almost impossible for new members to handle her. She was retired when it got to the point where only a handful of guard members were left who could handle her.

=== Shasta IV ===
Shasta IV (1977–1980) was also known as "Baby Shasta". She only served three years due to the difficulty in controlling her.

=== Shasta V ===
Shasta V (1980–1989) was the last female cougar of the original continuous line to serve as a live mascot for the University of Houston. After a kidney failure, she was euthanized. After Shasta V, interim President George Magner ended the tradition of a live mascot at the university, until 2012.

=== Shasta VI ===
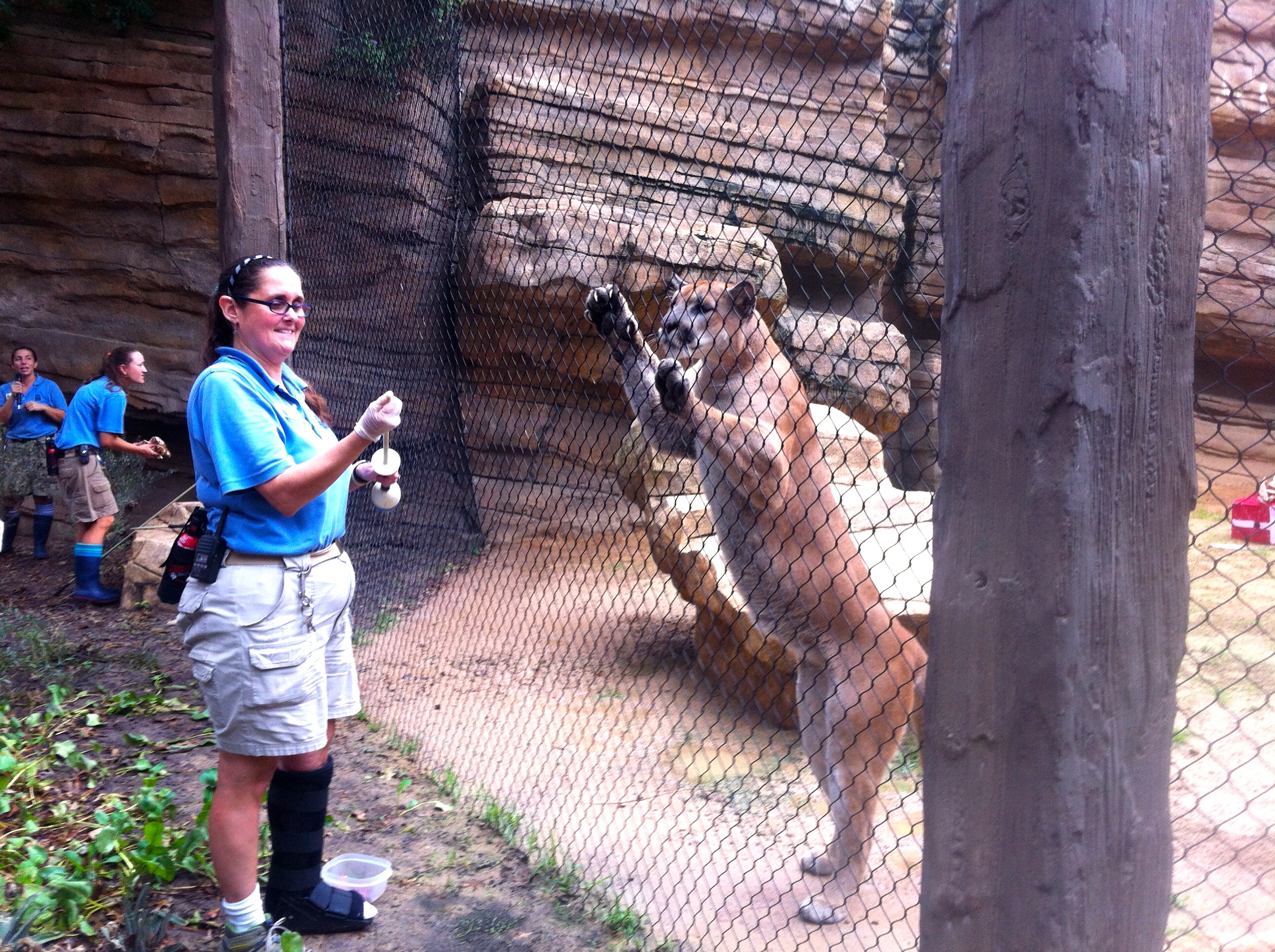
Shasta VI, The University of Houston's previous live mascot with his trainer

Shasta VI (2012–2022) was announced as the first live mascot at the university since 1989, in partnership with the Houston Zoo. Prior to his adoption, there was much debate as to whether or not the university should purchase another cougar. Those who opposed another live cougar often claimed that having a caged cougar was inhumane and dangerous. Shasta VI was born in September 2011 in the U.S. state of Washington, and was adopted by the university as a cub. Shasta's mother was killed in 2011, when a hunter shot her. After a search from the Washington Department of Fish & Wildlife, Shasta VI was rescued, and transported to the Houston Zoo on December 11, 2011. In March 2012, the University of Houston Alumni Association announced that the cub would be adopted.

Although the Shasta mascot costume has been a male since 1989, Shasta VI was the first male live UH cougar mascot. Shasta VI was vested in a ceremony for alumni on 24 March 2012.

Shasta VI died on August 4, 2022.

=== Shasta VII & Louie ===
Shasta VII (2022–present) is the current UH mascot. In late October 2022, two orphaned cougars were found by a rancher on his property in Washington state. At an estimated four weeks old, it was unlikely that the brothers would survive on their own in the wild. When word was sent out that the Houston Zoo had the capacity to care for cougars, the Washington State Fish & Wildlife Services reached out. The cubs were flown to Texas to get a second chance at life through the care of experts at the zoo. At eight weeks old, they were named Shasta VII and Louie. Together, they continue the tradition of proudly representing the spirit of the University of Houston through the alumni partnership with the Houston Zoo.

== Costumed mascots ==
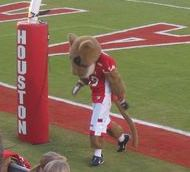
A costumed Shasta walking off the field of a football game at Robertson Stadium

From 1989 through 2012, the university chose not to purchase another live cougar, and Shasta only existed as a male costumed mascot, along with a female counterpart named Sasha. During this time, although a live cougar named "Tigger" appeared in the University of Houston's "Learning. Leading." campaign, this cougar did not live on campus nor was it owned by the university. Another live mascot, Shasta VI was adopted in 2012 through a partnership with the Houston Zoo, but a costumed student is still used for game appearances. The costumed Sasha mascot eventually began making appearances with Shasta, and now the two are seen at many University of Houston events.

=== The Oregon Duck incident ===
During the 2007 football season opener game between the Houston Cougars and the Oregon Ducks at Oregon, the costumed Shasta became involved in a physical fight with Oregon's Donald Duck mascot. The duck attacked Shasta while Shasta was doing push-ups for total points after each touchdown in front of the Cougar fans at Autzen Stadium. Push-ups for the total points scored are a tradition for the University of Houston as well as Oregon. After finishing some push-ups, the duck mascot physically attacked Shasta, eventually taking the mascot to the ground. Shasta, actually portrayed by the football player Matt Stolt for the Cougars, tackled the duck and walked away. The duck answered by punching the Houston mascot in the face and then performing simulated lewd acts on top of the cougar.

The fight was captured by both amateur video and game cameras, and was subsequently posted on YouTube as well as being reported on by most major media organizations including ESPN. University of Oregon's mascot was suspended for their next game against Fresno State as a disciplinary action. It was never revealed what further penalty the student in the duck suit faced.

== Gallery ==
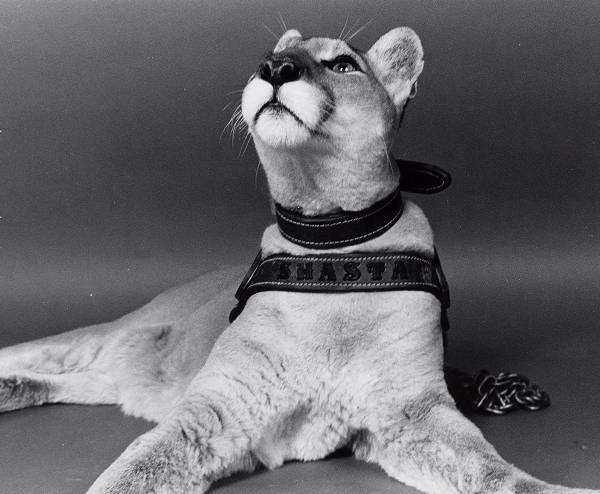
Shasta III, "The Lady"

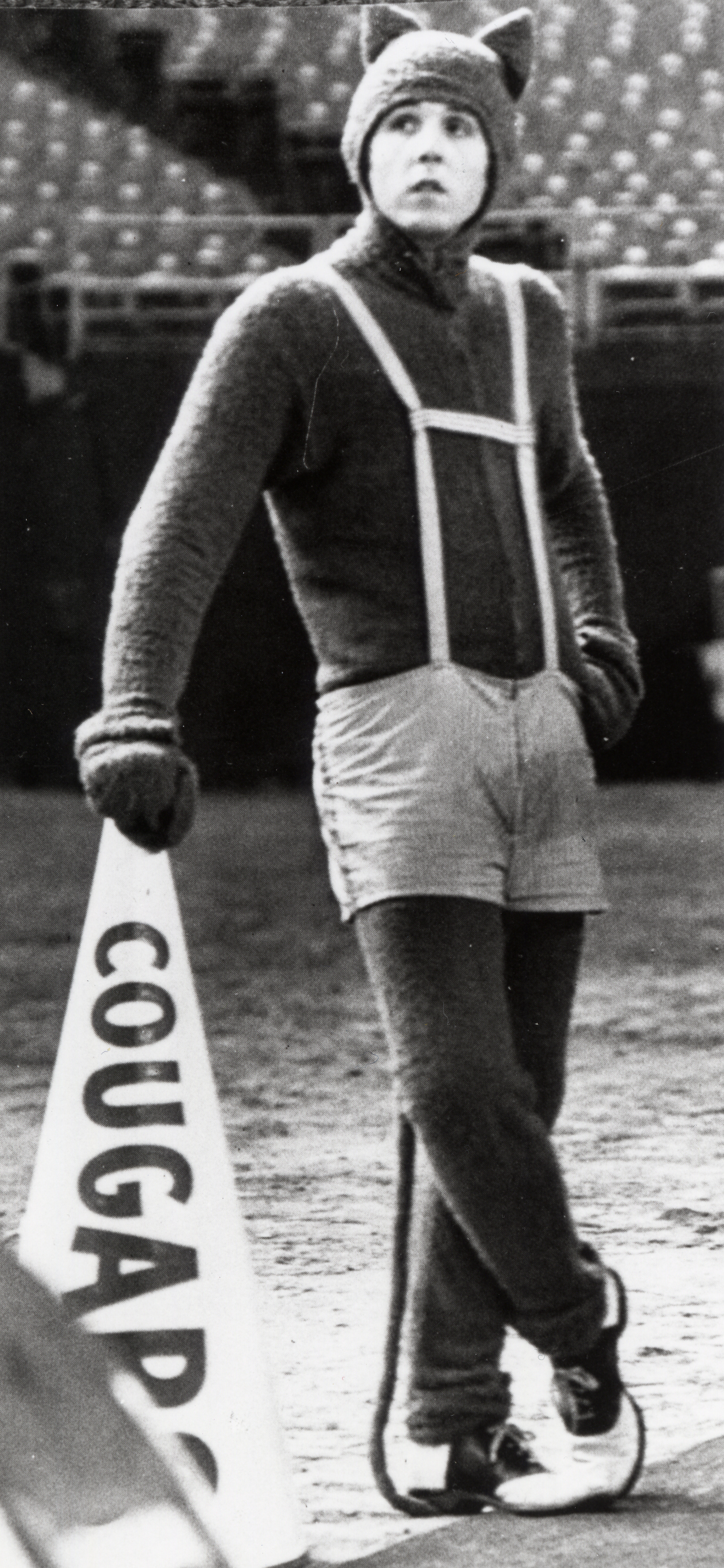
Cougar Mascot standing and leaning on a megaphone

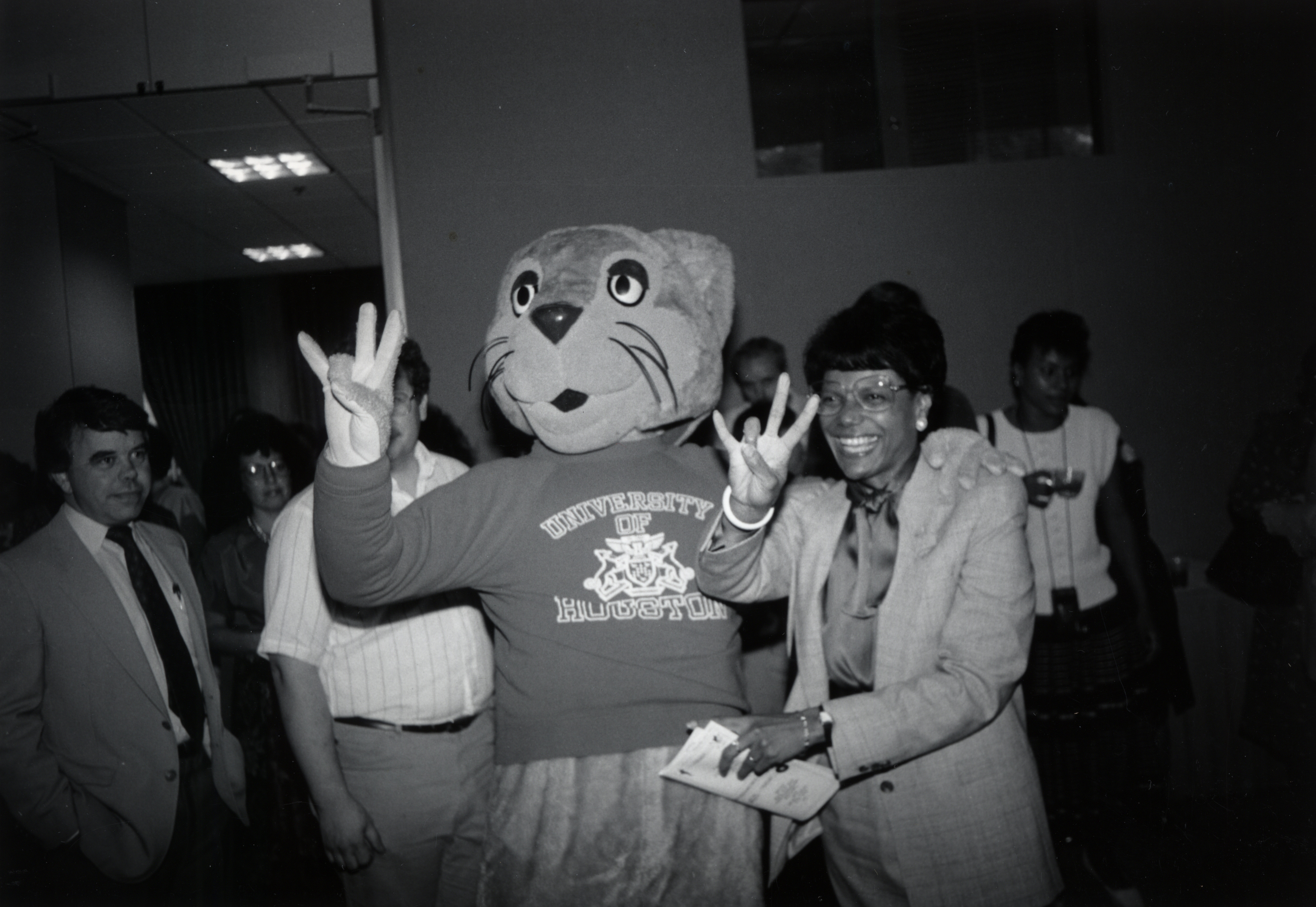
Early costumed Shasta poses with former university president Marguerite Ross Barnett during the 1990s

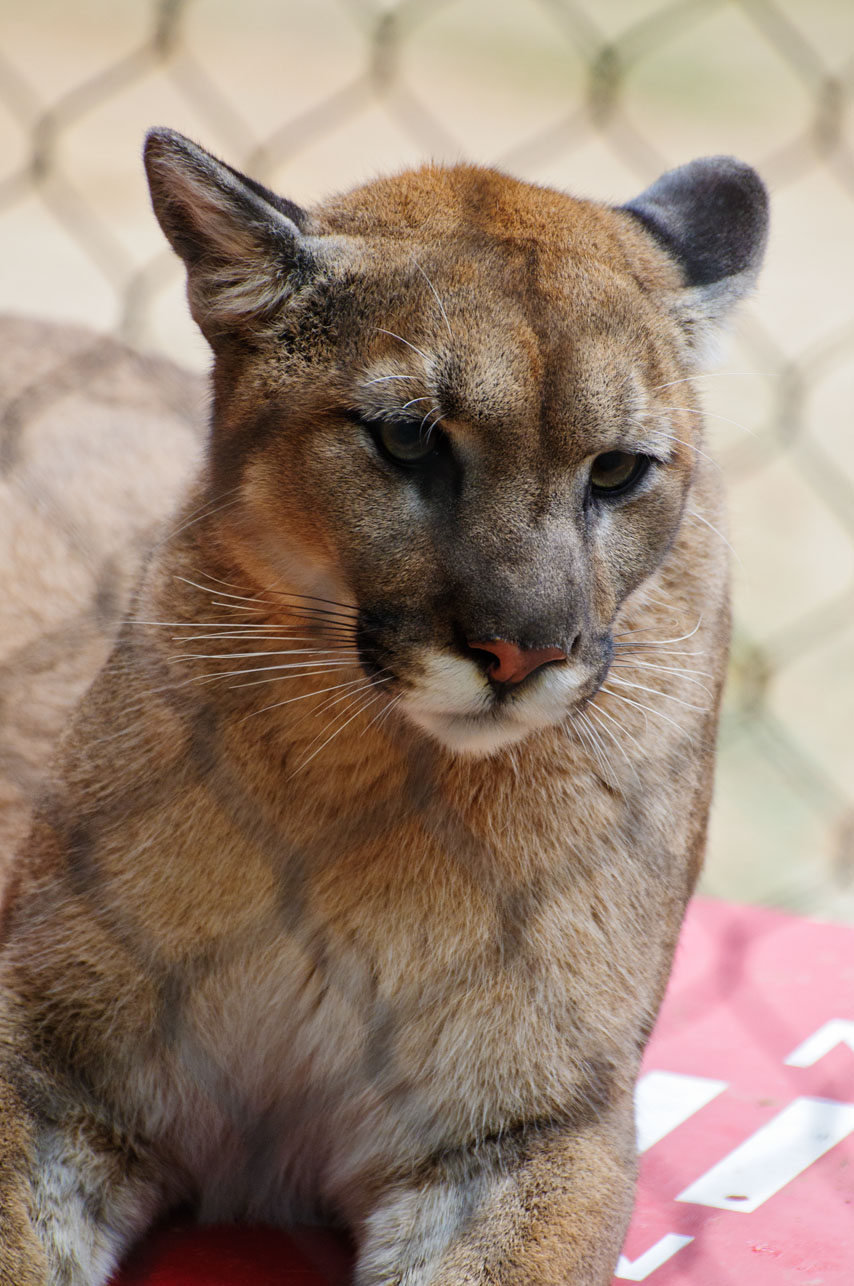
Shasta VI

== See also ==
- Houston Cougars
- List of college mascots in the United States
- University of Houston
