= Houston Cougars =

Intercollegiate sports teams of the University of Houston

- University: University of Houston
- Nickname: Cougars
- NCAA: Division I (FBS)
- Conference: Big 12
- Athletic director: Eddie Nuñez
- Location: Houston, Texas
- Varsity teams: 17
- Football stadium: TDECU Stadium
- Basketball arena: Fertitta Center
- Baseball stadium: Darryl & Lori Schroeder Park
- Softball stadium: Cougar Softball Stadium
- Colors: Scarlet and white
- Mascot: Shasta
- Fight song: Cougar Fight Song
- Website: uhcougars.com

Big 12 logo in Houston's colors

The Houston Cougars are the athletic teams representing the University of Houston. Informally, the Houston Cougars have also been referred to as the Coogs, UH, or simply Houston. Houston's nickname was suggested by early physical education instructor of the university and former head football coach, John R. Bender after one of his former teams, Washington State later adopted the mascot and nickname. The teams compete in the NCAA's Division I and the Football Bowl Subdivision as members of the Big 12 Conference.

The official school colors of the University of Houston are scarlet red and albino white, and the mascot is a cougar named Shasta. Houston's traditional rival has been Rice with whom the Cougars shared a conference for thirty-three non-consecutive years (see also Houston–Rice rivalry).

Houston has had notable sports teams in its history, including Phi Slama Jama and the sixteen-time national champion men's golf team. The university's campus is home to many on-campus athletic facilities including TDECU Stadium (on the site of the former Robertson Stadium), Fertitta Center, and Schroeder Park.

Prior to 1960, Houston was a member of several athletic conferences including the Lone Star Conference, Gulf Coast Conference, and Missouri Valley Conference. From 1960 until 1971, Houston competed as an independent. From 1971 until 1996, Houston's sports teams were a part of the Southwest Conference. After the dissolution of that conference in 1996, the Cougars became charter members of Conference USA. Houston remained a member of Conference USA until 2013 when they joined the American Athletic Conference. In September 2021, Houston received and accepted a membership offer to the Big 12 Conference. They became members of the Big 12 on July 1, 2023.

== Sports sponsored ==
Men's sports	Women's sports
Baseball	Basketball
Basketball	Cross country
Cross country	Golf
Football	Soccer
Golf	Softball
Track and field^{†}	Swimming and diving
	Tennis
	Track and field^{†}
	Volleyball
† – Track and field includes both indoor and outdoor

The most recently added sport was women's golf. Two players represented UH as individuals in the 2014 season (played during the 2013–14 school year), and a complete team was formed starting in the 2014–15 season.

=== Basketball ===
The Houston Cougars men's basketball team represents the University of Houston in NCAA Division I men's basketball competition. The Cougars Men's basketball team plays in the Big 12 Conference. The team last played in the NCAA Division I men's basketball tournament in 2025. The Cougars are currently coached by Kelvin Sampson. The Cougars play their home games in the Fertitta Center, which opened during the 2018–19 season after renovation of the former Hofheinz Pavilion. During the renovation, home games were played at H&PE Arena at Texas Southern University.

Notable players for the UH men's basketball team include Basketball Hall of Famers Hakeem Olajuwon and Clyde Drexler (who would win two and one NBA Championships respectively, both for the hometown Houston Rockets in 1994–95, with Olajuwon being the Finals MVP for both titles) and also were part of the legendary Cougars fraternity Phi Slama Jama, as well as Otis Birdsong and Hall of Famer Elvin Hayes (who would win one NBA Championship with the Washington Bullets in 1978). Each of these players has had his number retired. Notable coaches for the Cougars are Guy Lewis, Clyde Drexler and Kelvin Sampson. Notable games for the Cougars include the first nationally syndicated NCAA basketball game, known as the "Game of the Century," and the NCAA National Championship Games in 1983, 1984, and 2025.

In the modern era, the Cougars have re-established themselves as a national powerhouse under head coach Kelvin Sampson. Houston reached the Final Four in 2021, their first trip to the national semifinals since 1984. After moving to the Big 12 Conference in 2023, the Cougars quickly proved competitive. They captured regular-season conference titles in both 2024 and 2025; in the latter season they won the Big 12 tournament title and advanced to the national championship game. Known for their defensive intensity and physical style of play, the Cougars have consistently finished near the top of national defensive rankings. This resurgence has made Houston one of the most respected programs in college basketball today.

The women's team has made the NCAA Tournament in 1988, 1992, 2004, 2005, and 2011.

=== Football ===
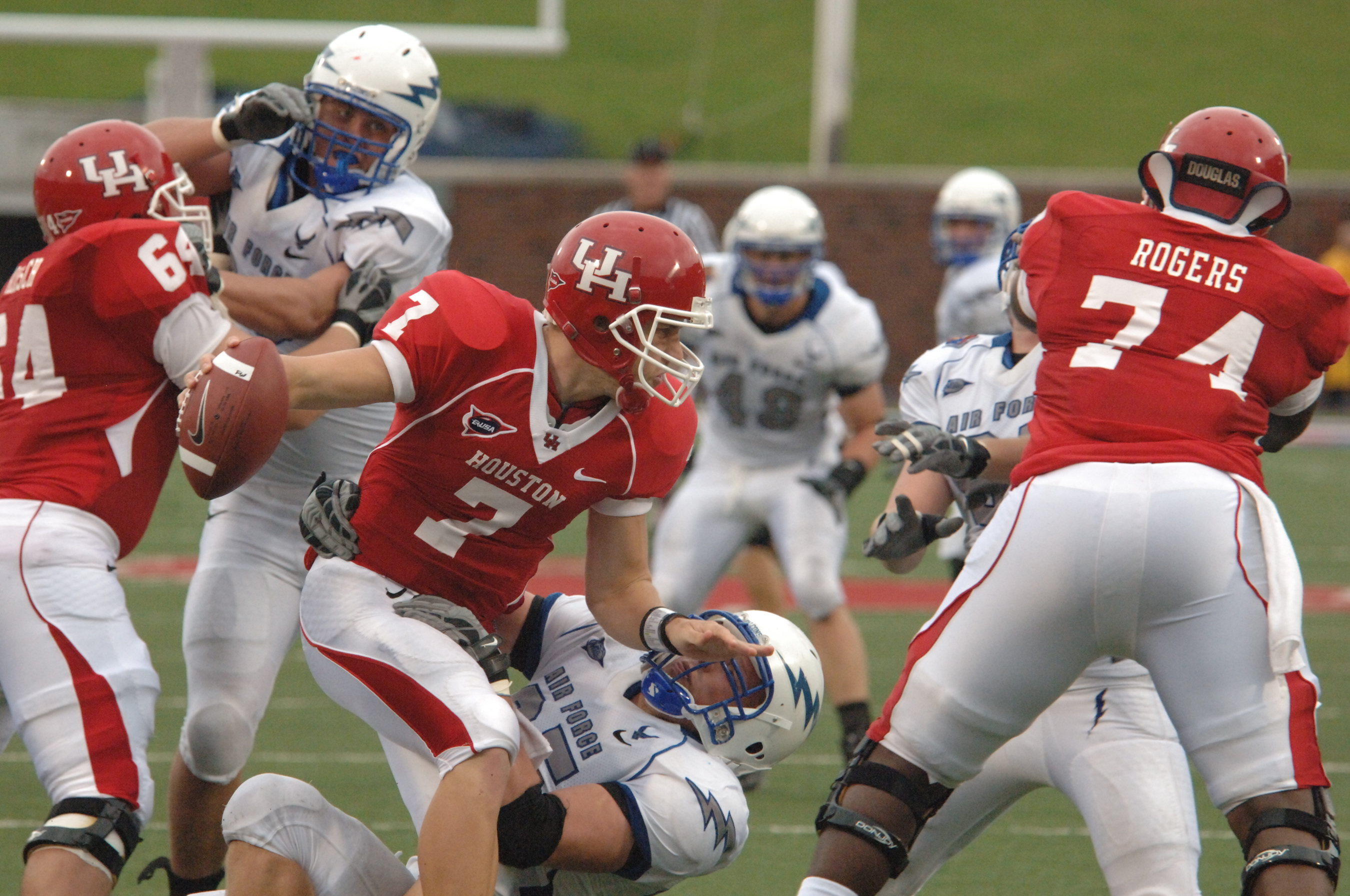
Houston Cougars football versus Air Force in 2008

UH fielded its first varsity intercollegiate football team in 1946. The Houston Cougars football team currently competes in the NCAA Division I Football Bowl Subdivision. After completing 18 seasons in C-USA in 2012, the Cougars joined the American Athletic Conference in 2013.

The team played its home games at Robertson Stadium before it was closed and demolished after the 2012 season. The Cougars divided their home schedule in their first AAC season between Reliant Stadium and BBVA Compass Stadium; the new TDECU Stadium opened on the Robertson Stadium site in 2014.

The 2015 Houston Cougars football team, led by then first-year head coach Tom Herman, enjoyed one of the most successful seasons in program history. The Cougars finished the season with a 13–1 record, winning the American Athletic Conference (AAC) Championship by defeating Temple 24–13. Their performance earned them a spot in the 2015 Peach Bowl, one of the prestigious New Year's Six bowl games. In the Peach Bowl, Houston defeated ninth-ranked Florida State 38–24, securing the program's first major bowl victory since the 1980 Cotton Bowl and finishing the season ranked No. 8 in the final AP Poll.

The Cougars are coached by Willie Fritz, who was named head coach in December 2023. The Cougars joined the Big 12 Conference on July 1, 2023.

=== Golf ===
The Houston Cougars men's golf program, founded in 1946, is one of the most successful in NCAA history. Under legendary coach Dave Williams, the Cougars won 16 NCAA team national championships between 1956 and 1985, the second most all-time. The program also produced eight individual national champions and numerous PGA Tour professionals, including Fred Couples and Fuzzy Zoeller. Now competing in the Big 12 Conference, Houston continues its tradition of excellence under head coach Jonathan Dismuke.

=== Baseball ===
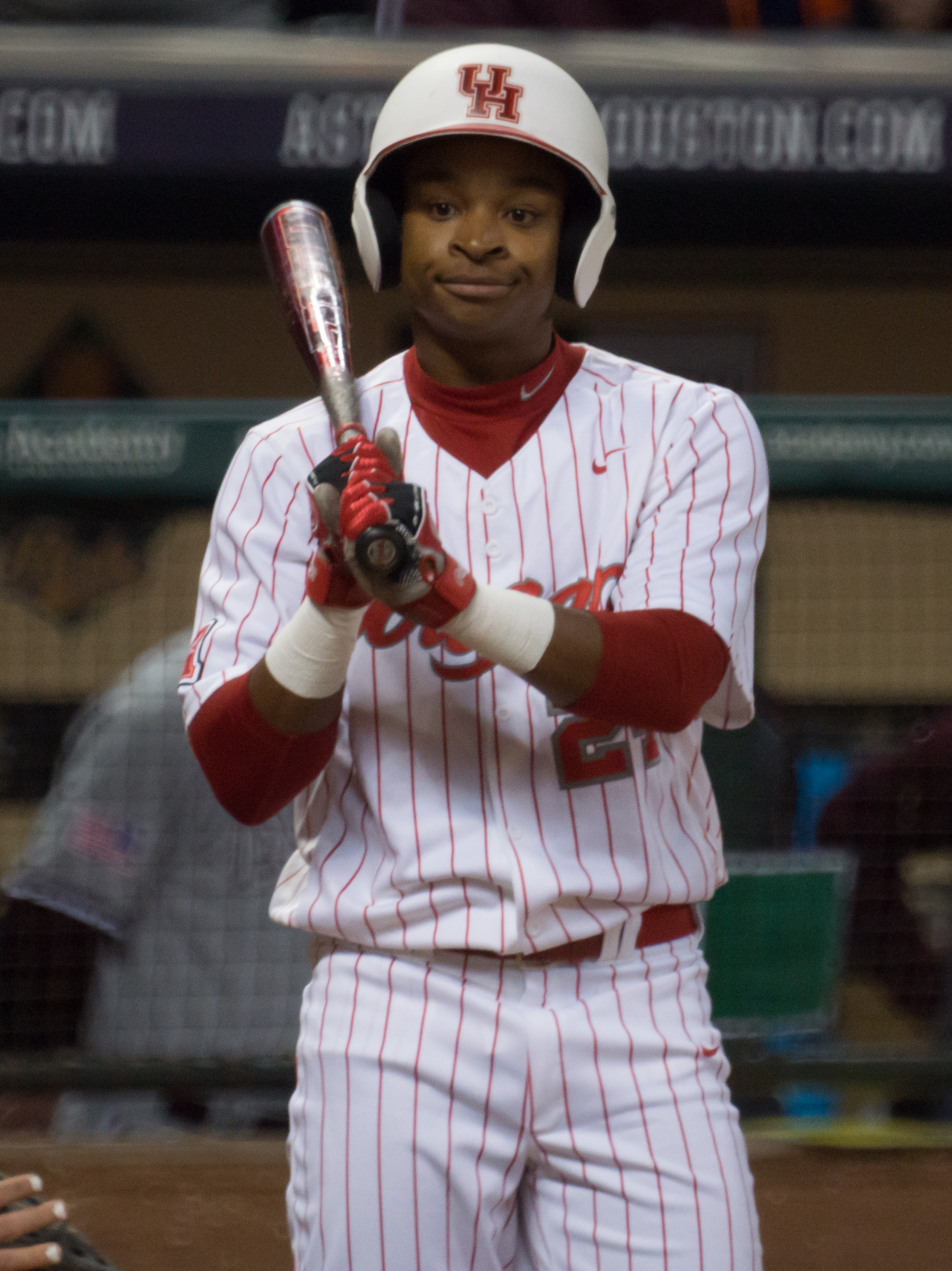
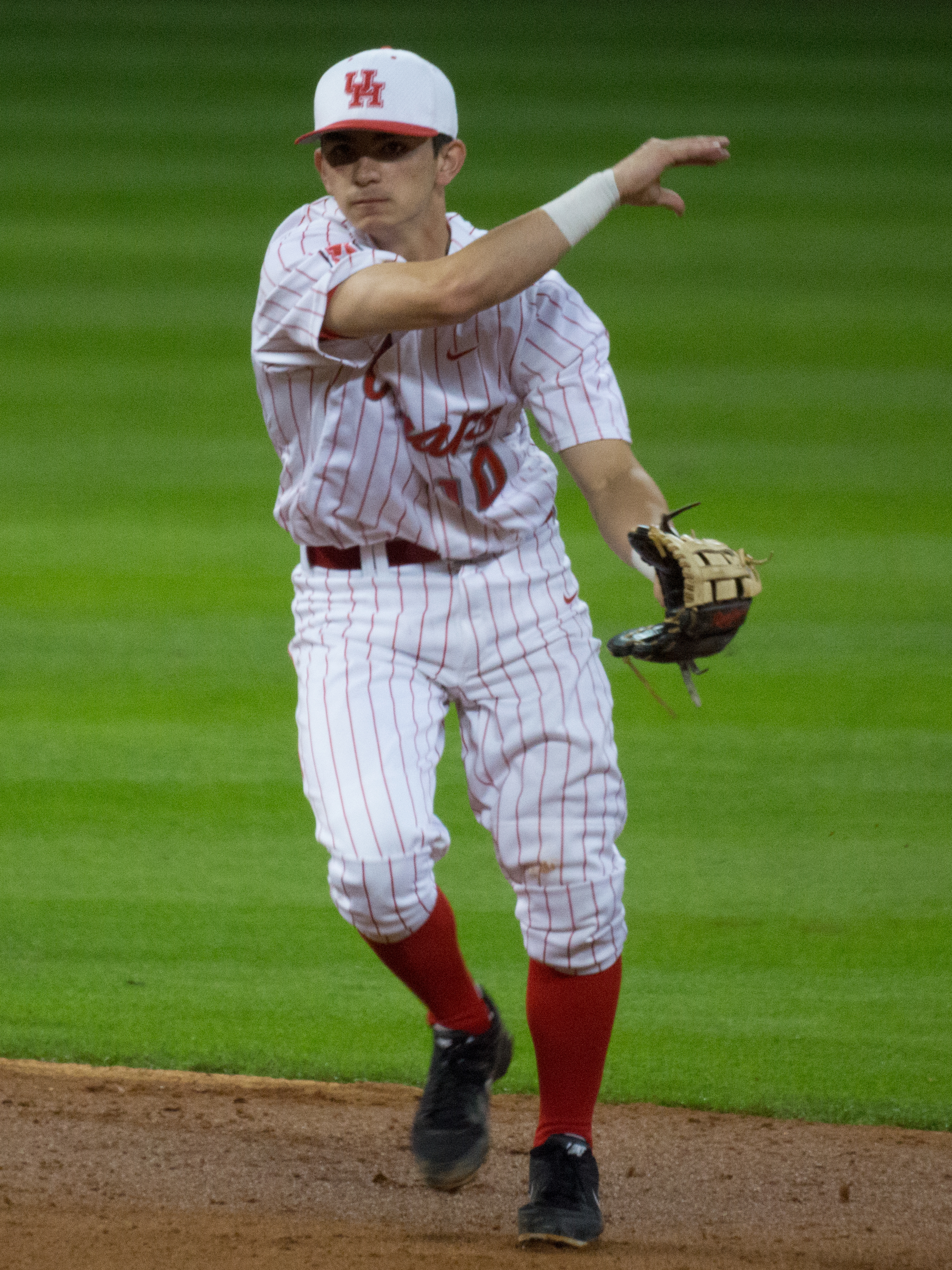
Corey Julks (left) and Connor Wong (right) with the Cougars during a game at Minute Maid Park in 2015.

Along with the university's other athletic teams, the baseball team is a member of the Big 12 Conference as a Division I team. They play their home games at Schroeder Park and are currently coached by Todd Whitting. The Houston Cougars baseball program has appeared in 22 NCAA Regionals, four Super Regionals, and two College World Series.

=== Softball ===
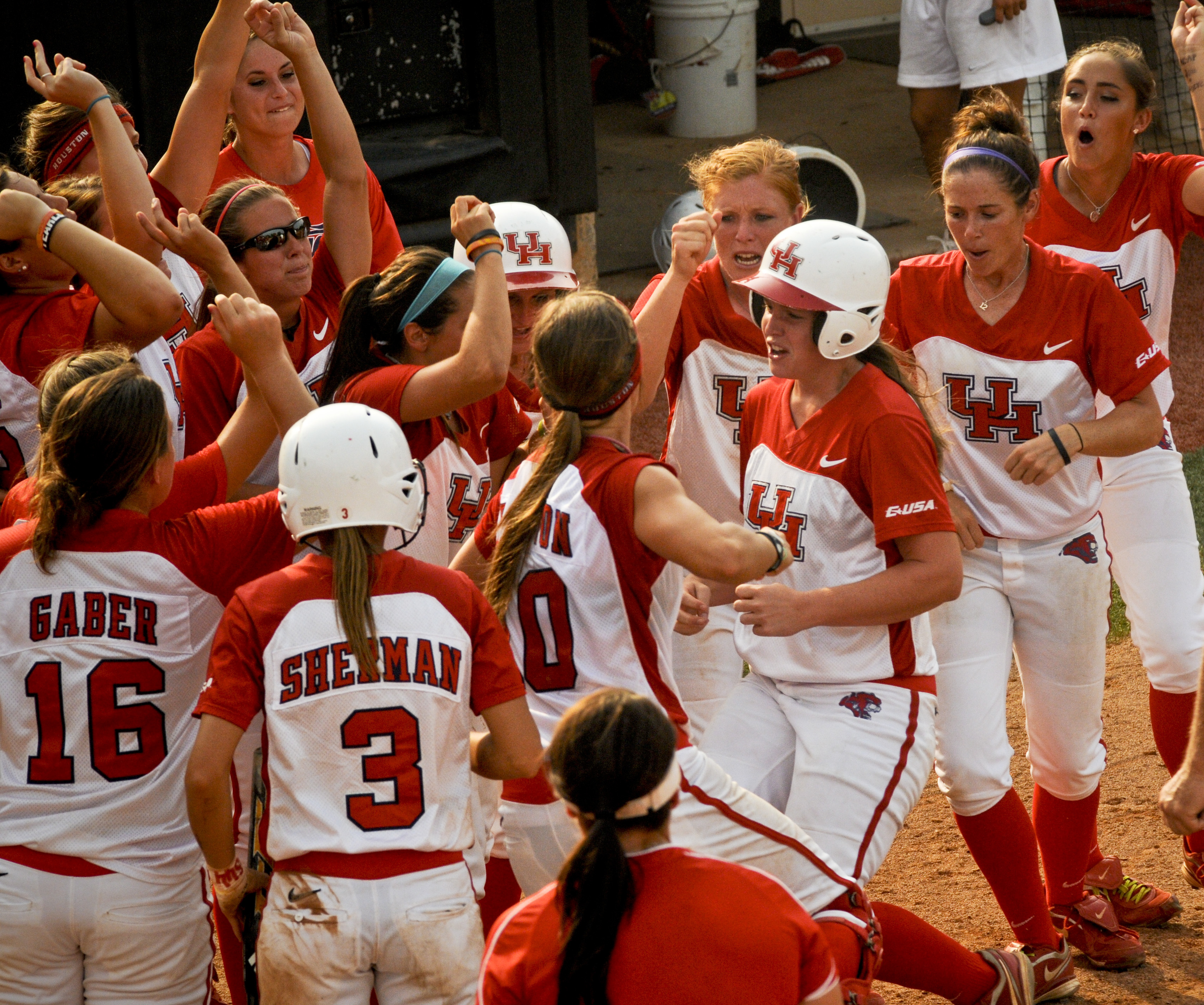
Cougars softball players celebrate a home run during the 2011 NCAA Division I softball tournament

The Houston Cougars softball team is a member of the Big 12 Conference of Division I. Their home games are played at Cougar Softball Stadium on-campus. The team was established in 2001 and has appeared in nine NCAA Regionals and two Super Regionals.

=== Cross Country ===
The Houston Cougars men's cross country team represents the University of Houston in NCAA Division I competition. The program's highlight came in 1960 when the Cougars won the NCAA Division I men's cross country championship, the only team title in program history. Houston now competes in the Big 12 Conference.

== Championships ==
=== NCAA team championships ===
Houston has won 17 NCAA team national championships.

- Men's (17)
  - Cross Country (1): 1960
  - Golf (16): 1956, 1957, 1958, 1959, 1960, 1962, 1964, 1965, 1966, 1967, 1969, 1970, 1977, 1982, 1984, 1985
- see also:
  - Big 12 Conference national team titles
  - List of NCAA schools with the most NCAA Division I championships
  - List of NCAA schools with the most Division I national championships

== Notable Non Varsity Sports ==
=== Ice Hockey ===
The University of Houston Ice Hockey Club competes in the American Collegiate Hockey Association (ACHA). The team was originally formed in 1935 but was disbanded during the mid-20th century. In the fall of 2023, the club was resurrected and played its first game post-revival against East Texas Baptist University.

Since its return, the University of Houston Ice Hockey Club has actively participated in games against other traditional rivals, including the University of Texas at Austin, Southern Methodist University, Texas Christian University, University of Texas at San Antonio, and Texas State University. The team's re-establishment has been met with enthusiasm from students and alumni, contributing to the growing popularity of ice hockey within the city of Houston.

The club's home games are played at the Sugar Land Ice & Sports Center, where they have begun to establish a dedicated fan base. The team's roster includes a diverse group of players, many of whom bring previous competitive hockey experience from high school and various junior hockey leagues.

=== Rugby ===
The University of Houston Rugby Club plays college rugby in the Southwest Collegiate Rugby Conference of Division 1-A Rugby which also includes Rice, Sam Houston State, Stephen F. Austin, Texas A&M, Texas State, and Texas Tech. The UH Rugby Club previously played Division III college rugby.

=== Cricket ===
The University of Houston Cricket Club won the 2019 National College Cricket Association championship.

=== Fencing ===
The University of Houston has a history of student fencing clubs competing in the Southwest Intercollegiate Fencing Association (SWIFA). A former UH fencing club competed in SWIFA in the late 2000s and early 2010s before closing. In 2009, its saber team won first place at the SWIFA competition. Fencing at the university was later restarted as Cougar Fencing. The current club also competes in SWIFA. During the 2025–26 season, Houston won the SWIFA foil championship at SWIFA 3 and SWIFA 4. Houston fencer John Griffin was named to the SWIFA Foil All-Conference first team.

== Rivalries ==
Houston's most meaningful current rivalry is with cross-town Rice University, which is a member of the American Athletic Conference. The Cougars and Rice Owls have competed in football, annually with a few exceptions, for a trophy known as the "Bayou Bucket", referencing one of the city of Houston's nicknames as the "Bayou City."

=== Other rivals ===
Another notable rivalry for Houston was with Texas Tech University, also a former member of the Southwest Conference. The Cougars and Red Raiders met frequently in football and other sports during their shared conference years, with many competitive and high-scoring games fueling the rivalry. Though conference realignments limited regular matchups for several years, the rivalry has seen renewed interest with both schools now competing in the Big 12 Conference against one another since 2023.

Historically, the University of Texas was one of Houston's principal rivals, when Houston was part of the now-defunct Southwest Conference. This rivalry gave rise to the Houston Cougar Paw tradition.

== Athletic facilities ==
Most of the university's major sports facilities are located along Cullen Boulevard, the central traffic artery through the campus. At times in the past, some of the university's teams have played their home games at off-campus venues such as the Astrodome and Rice Stadium. The golf programs compete off campus because they do not have a dedicated golf course on campus. University of Houston's current sports facilities include the following:

- TDECU Stadium – Football
- Memorial Hermann Football Operations Center
- Fertitta Center – Men's and Women's Basketball, and Volleyball
- Schroeder Park – Baseball
- Cougar Softball Stadium – Softball
- Tom Tellez Track at Carl Lewis International Complex – Outdoor Track & Field and Soccer
- John E. Hoff Courts – Tennis
- CRWC Natatorium – Swimming & Diving
- Athletics/Alumni Center – Indoor Tennis and Indoor Track & Field (Training: All Sports)
- Yeoman Fieldhouse – Indoor Track & Field
- Golf Club of Houston – Men's and Women's Golf
- Dave Williams Golf Academy – Men's and Women's Golf

The Houston Dynamo of Major League Soccer was a tenant at Robertson Stadium until 2011. The Dynamo achieved a home record of 50–16–26 at Robertson.

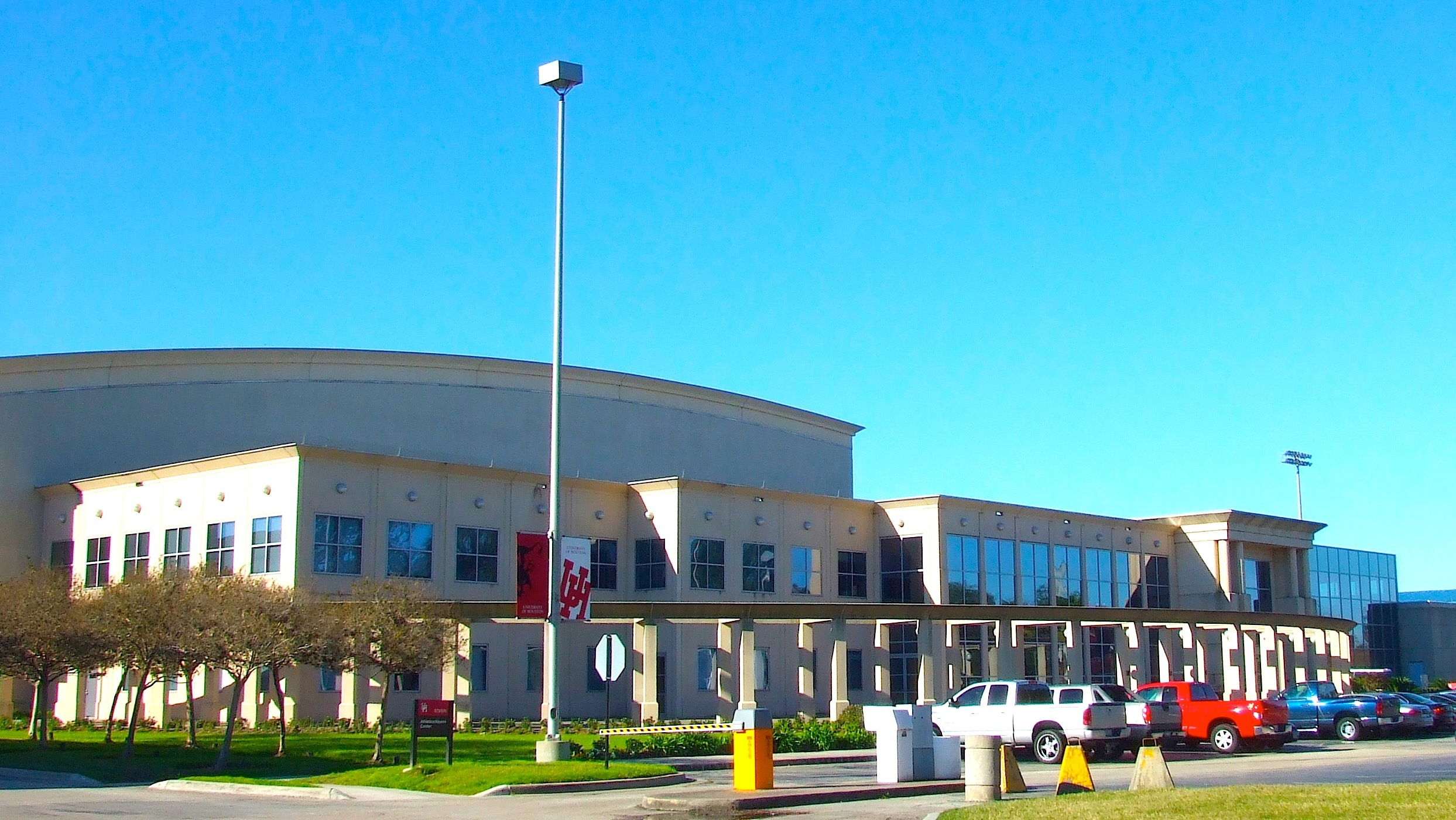
The Athletics/Alumni Center on Cullen Boulevard

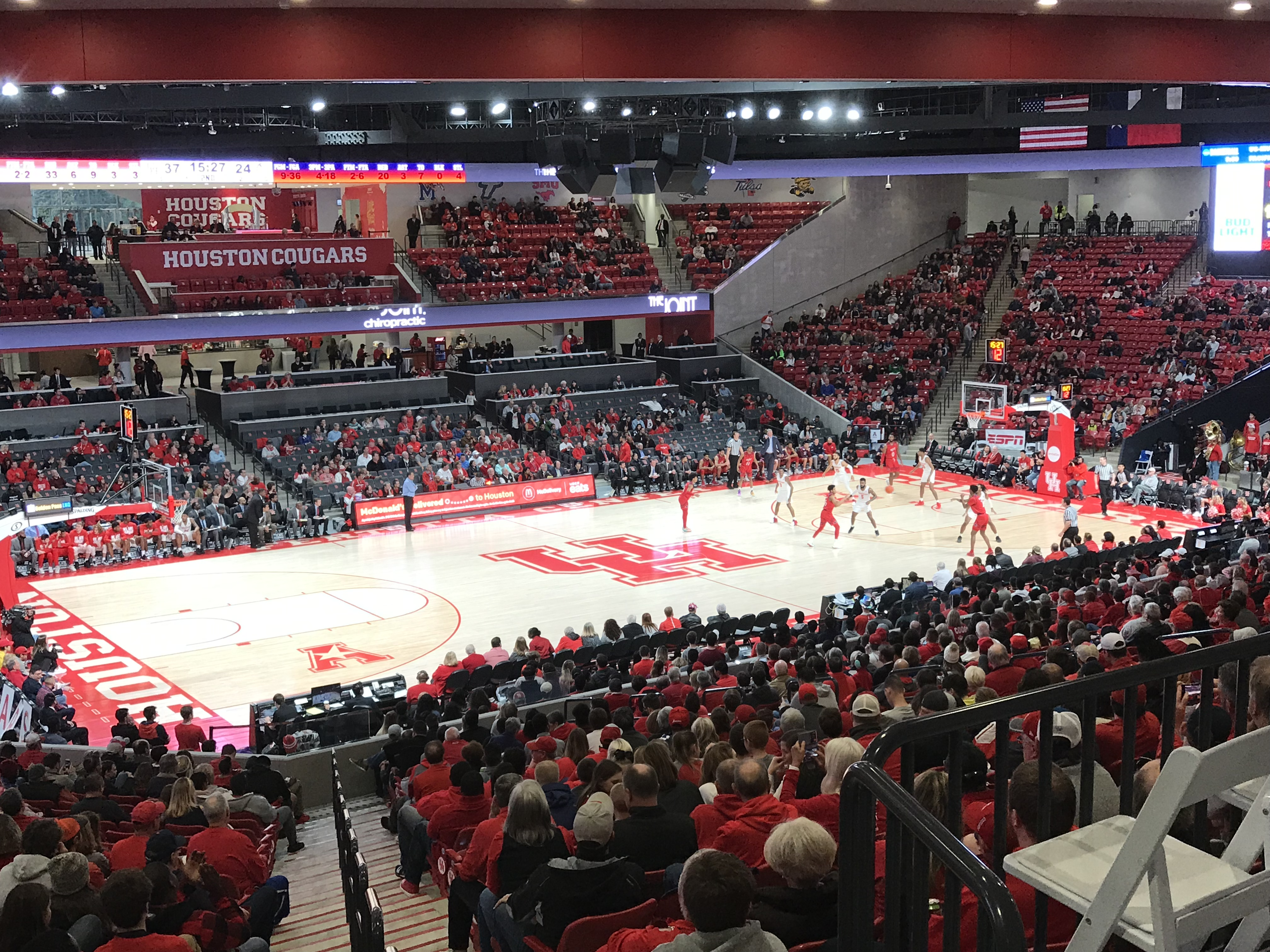
Fertitta Center

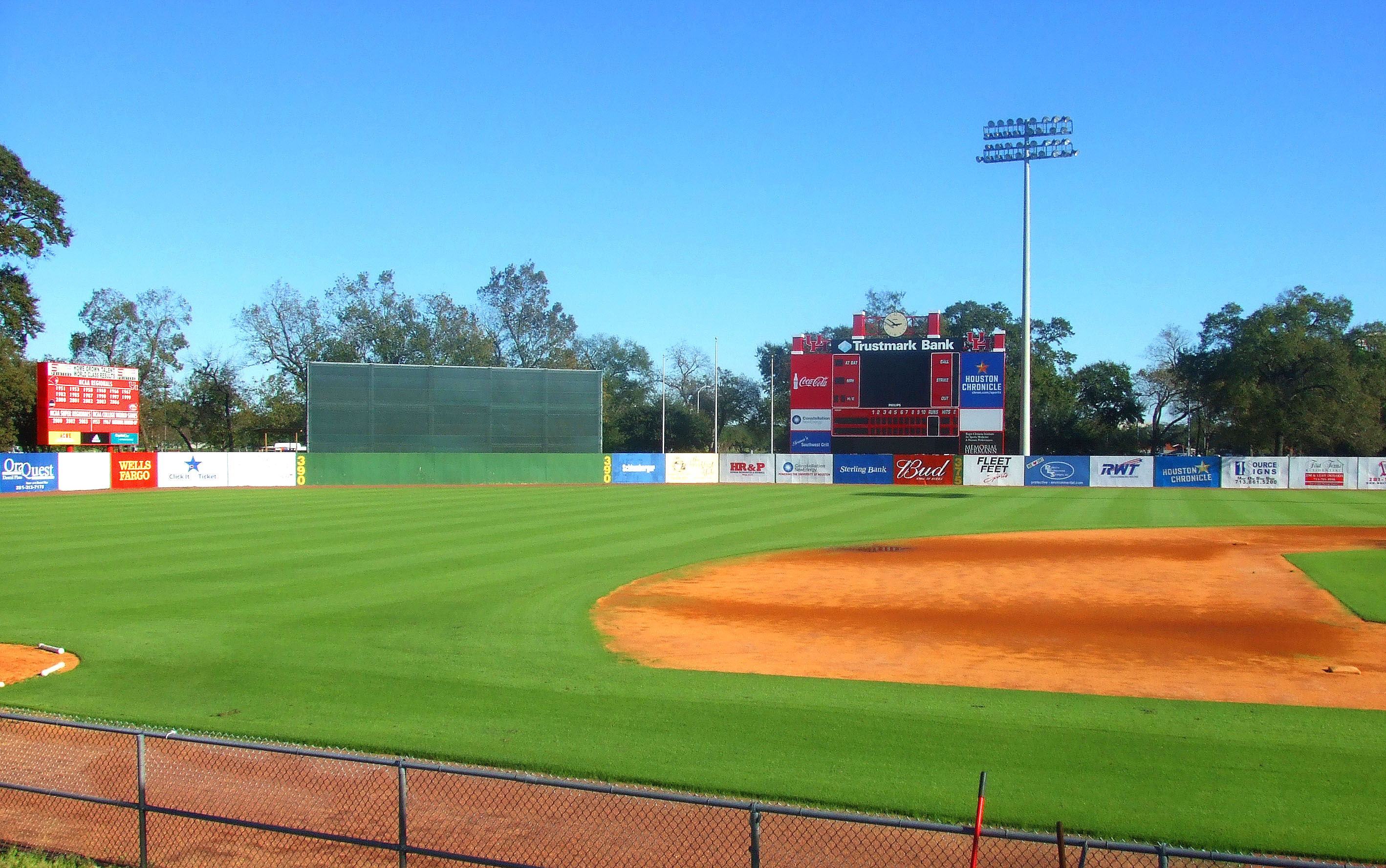
Darryl & Lori Schroeder Park

== Athletic Directors ==
Name	Tenure
Harry Fouke	1945–1979
Cedric Dempsey	1979–1982
John Kasser	1982–1984
Tom Ford	1984–1986
Michael Johnson (interim)	1986–1987
Rudy Davalos	1987–1992
Bill Carr	1993–1997
Chet Gladchuk Jr.	1997–2001
Dave Maggard	2002–2009
Mack Rhoades	2009–2015
Hunter Yurachek	2015–2017
Chris Pezman	2017–2024
Raymond Bartlett (interim)	2024
Eddie Nuñez	2024–present
