= Tom Ford (athletic director) =

American athletic director

Biographical details
- Education: University of Pacific

Administrative career (AD unless noted)
- 1979–1982: Houston (assistant AD)
- 1982–1984: Houston (associate AD)
- 1984–1986: Houston
- 1990–1992: UC Irvine
- 1992–2004: NABC (assistant ED)
- 2007–2018: Cal State Northridge (associate AD)

Tom Ford is an American academic administrator who was the director of athletics at Houston (1984–1986) and UC Irvine (1990–1992).

== Early career ==
Ford graduated from the University of Pacific in 1977 with a bachelor of business administration. He held various positions at his alma mater, including executive director of the Pacific Athletic Association and business manager of the McGeorge School of Law.

== Houston ==
In 1979, Ford followed Pacific athletic director Cedric Dempsey to Houston. Ford was the Cougars' assistant director of athletics for fundraising from 1979 to 1982 and associate director of athletics 1982 to 1984. In 1984, he was promoted to athletic director after John Kasser left for Long Beach State.

In 1985, two of Houston's top recruits, basketball player Tito Horford and sprinter Joe DeLoach were declared ineligible due to recruiting violations. That July, the University stripped the basketball team of two scholarships and barred assistant coach Donnie Schverak from off campus recruiting for a year as self-imposed sanctions stemming from the Horford scandal. In 1986, the NCAA launched an investigation into the Houston Cougars football after 12 players failed out of school, 10 of 28 recruits were ruled academically ineligible, and two players alleged that coach Bill Yeoman and his staff had paid players and allowed them to play when ineligible. The National Collegiate Athletic Association placed Houston's football program on probation for three years. Most of the violations cited by the NCAA occurred before Ford was athletic director and Ford was not implicated in any specific violations. Houston's athletic department was also dealing with record-low attendance and was $3 million debt. That June, Ford resigned because he did not like how Houston's board of regents was handling the investigation into the athletic program.

== UC Irvine ==
From 1986 to 1988, Ford was the director of consulting services and program development at Raycom Sports. In 1989, he became the manager of the University of Arizona's extended university in Phoenix, Arizona. He oversaw the program's classes, budget, faculty selection, marketing, and promotions.

In 1990, Ford was named athletic director at UC Irvine. He took over an athletic department that was struggling financially. In 1991, the university cut funding to the water polo, men's soccer, men's volleyball, crew, and sailing programs, leaving those teams to raise the money to keep their programs afloat themselves. Later that year, the department laid off two employees and delayed hiring two others due to budget cuts. In 1992, the university eliminated its baseball and men's cross country and track and field programs and laid off its assistant athletic director for fund development. In July 1992, Ford resigned due to frustration with the school's financial issues.

== Later career ==
From 1992 to 2004, Ford worked for the National Association of Basketball Coaches, first as assistant executive director, then as associate executive director. While at the NABC, he helped to establish a corporate sponsorship program, developed action plans to increase revenue, oversaw the broadcast contracts for select NABC events, and directed a $30 million fundraising campaign for the NABC Foundation and the National Collegiate Basketball Hall of Fame.

In 2007, Ford was named associate athletic director for external relations at Cal State Northridge. He retired in 2018.
