= Mack Rhoades =

American college athletic administrator

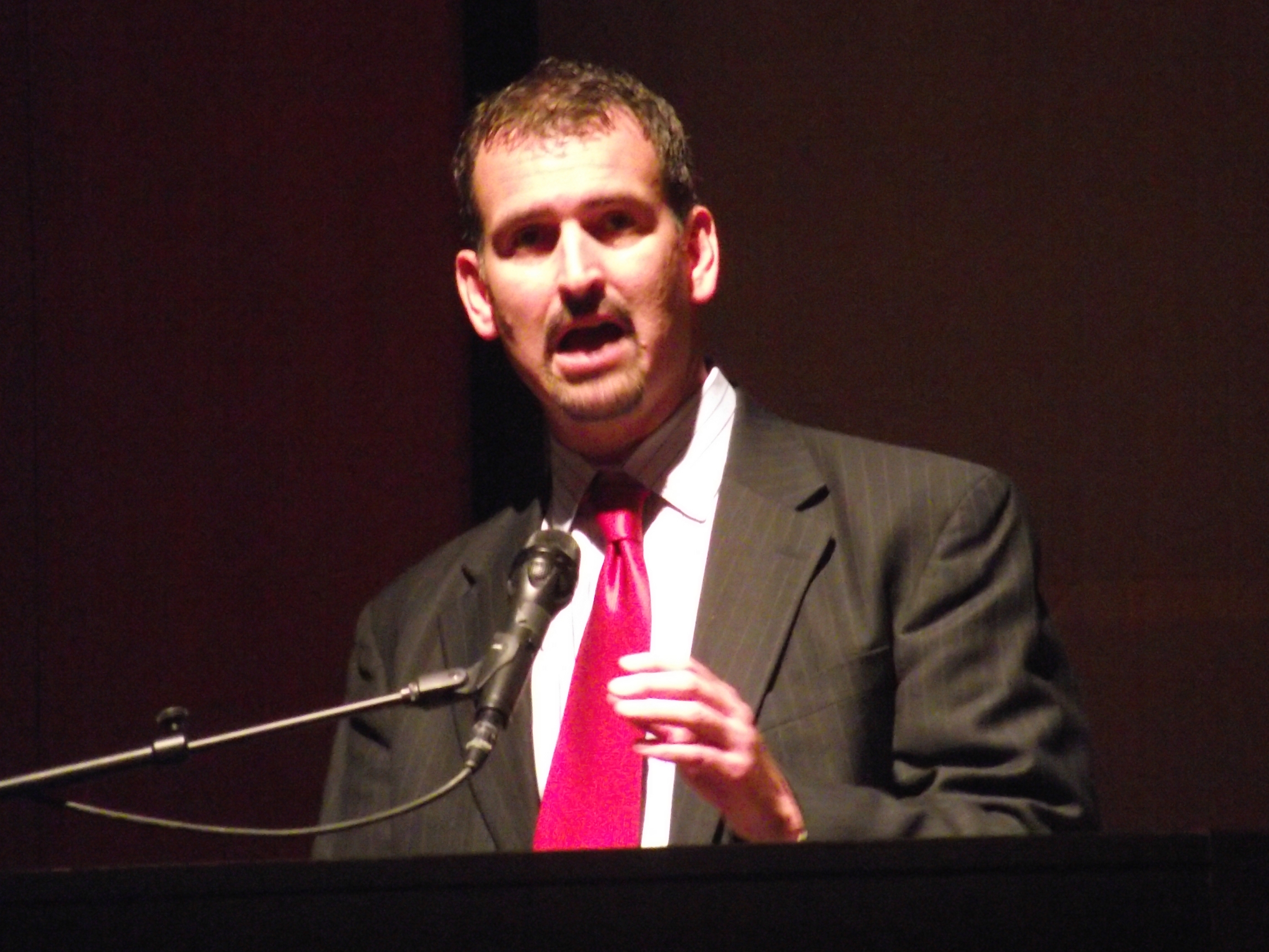
- Rhoades speaking during his tenure at Houston

Biographical details
- Born: October 18, 1965 (age 61); Tucson, Arizona, U.S.
- Education: University of Arizona; Indiana University Bloomington

Administrative career (AD unless noted)
- 1996: Yale (marketing asst.)
- 1997–1998: Marquette (advancement)
- 1998–2006: UTEP (exec. sr. assoc. AD)
- 2006–2009: Akron
- 2009–2015: Houston
- 2015–2016: Missouri
- 2016–2025: Baylor

Mack Bernard Rhoades IV (born October 18, 1965) is a former American college athletics administrator who was the athletic director at Baylor University from 2016 to 2025. Rhoades was previously the athletic director at the University of Akron from 2006 to 2009, the University of Houston from 2009 to 2015, and the University of Missouri from 2015 to 2016. Rhoades was hired at Akron in December 2005 after former Zips athletic director Mike Thomas took the same position at the University of Cincinnati. Prior to his arrival at Akron, he had worked in the athletics department at University of Texas at El Paso (UTEP) since 1998.

== See also ==
- List of NCAA Division I athletic directors
