= Tommy Ford (Canadian football) =

Canadian football player

Profile
- Position: Halfback

Personal information
- Born: c. 1927
- Died: September 14, 1992 (aged 64–65); Winnipeg, Manitoba, Canada
- Listed height: 5 ft 10 in (1.78 m)
- Listed weight: 175 lb (79 kg)

Career history
- 1949: Toronto Argonauts
- 1950–1954: Winnipeg Blue Bombers
- 1955: Saskatchewan Roughriders

Thomas Edward Ford (c. 1927 – September 14, 1992) was a Canadian football player who played for the Toronto Argonauts, Winnipeg Blue Bombers and Saskatchewan Roughriders.
