= Cedric Dempsey =

American sports administrator (1932–2025)

Biographical details
- Born: April 14, 1932; Equality, Illinois, U.S.
- Died: April 5, 2025 (aged 92); San Diego, California, U.S.

Playing career

Football
- c. 1953: Albion

Basketball
- ?–1954: Albion

Baseball
- ?–1954: Albion

Coaching career (HC unless noted)

Basketball
- 1959–1962: Albion
- 1963–1965: Arizona (assistant)

Cross country
- 1959–1962: Albion

Administrative career (AD unless noted)
- 1965–1967: Arizona (assistant AD)
- 1967–1979: Pacific (CA)
- 1979: San Diego State
- 1979–1982: Houston
- 1983–1993: Arizona
- 1994–2002: NCAA (president)
- 2007–2010: AAFL (commissioner)

Head coaching record
- Overall: 29–35 (basketball)

Cedric Warren Dempsey (April 14, 1932 – April 5, 2025) was an American sports administrator who became the third executive director of the National Collegiate Athletic Association (NCAA) from 1994 to 2003. Before leaving the post in 2002, Dempsey restructured the organization, cracked down on gambling in college sports, emphasized financial responsibility, and negotiated major television contracts with ESPN and CBS.

Dempsey served as the athletic director at the University of the Pacific (1967–1979), San Diego State University (1979), University of Houston (1979–1982) and the University of Arizona (1983–1993). Dempsey's tenure at Arizona was noted for raising the university's national prominence in NCAA sports, particularly in basketball, football, softball and golf. He also served as Commissioner of the All American Football League (2007–2010).

Dempsey died in San Diego, California on April 5, 2025, at the age of 92.
