= Edwin =

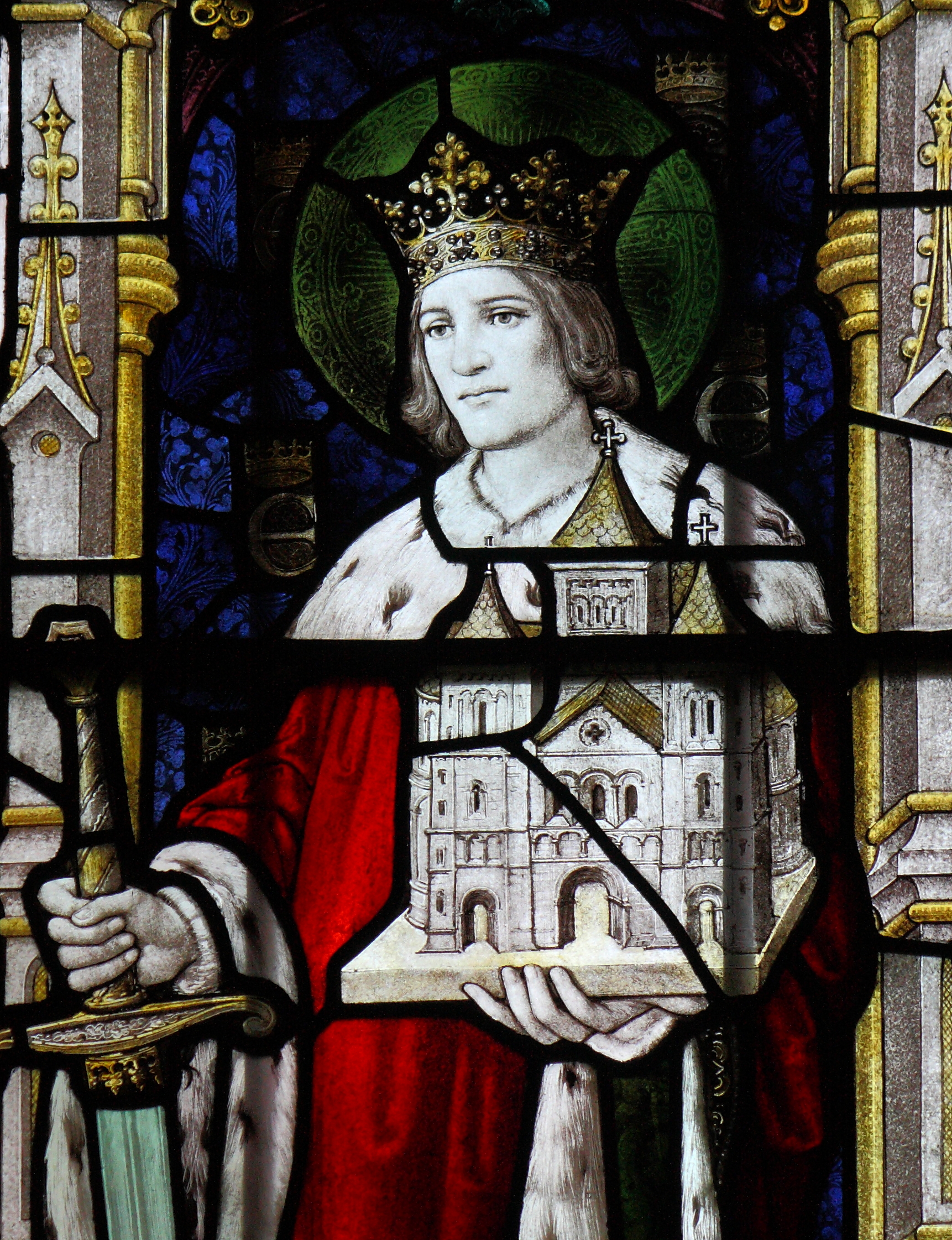
- Saint Edwin of Northumbria
- Gender: Male
- Name day: Poland: 11 March, France, Germany, United States: 12 October

Other gender
- Feminine: Edwina

Origin
- Meaning: rich/blessed friend
- Region of origin: England

Other names
- Related names: Audun, Edward, Edvin, Edvīns

The name Edwin means "wealth-friend". It comes from Old English: ēad (wealth, good fortune) and Old English: wine (friend). Thus the Old English form is Ēadwine, a name widely attested in early medieval England. Edwina is the feminine form of the name.

Notable people and characters with the name include:

== Historical figures ==
- Edwin of Northumbria (died 632 or 633), King of Northumbria and Christian saint
- Edwin (son of Edward the Elder) (died 933)
- Eadwine of Sussex (died 982), Ealdorman of Sussex
- Eadwine of Abingdon (died 990), Abbot of Abingdon
- Edwin, Earl of Mercia (died 1071), brother-in-law of Harold Godwinson (Harold II)
- Edwin Sandys (bishop) (1519–1588), Archbishop of York

== Modern era ==
- E. W. Abeygunasekera, Sri Lankan Sinhala politician
- Edwin Abbott Abbott (1838–1926), English schoolmaster, theologian, and Anglican priest
- Edwin Ariyadasa (1922–2021), Sri Lankan Sinhala journalist
- Edwin Arrieta Arteaga (died 2023), Colombian murder victim
- Edwin Austin Abbey (1852–1911), British artist
- Edwin Eugene Aldrin (born 1930), birth name of Buzz Aldrin, American astronaut
- Edwin Anderson, several people
- Edwin Howard Armstrong (1890–1954), American inventor
- Edwin Bailey (politician) (1836–1908), English-American businessman and politician
- Edwin Batdorf (1853–1927), American colonel
- Edwin L. Bauer (1905–c. 1989), American tropical modernist architect in Hawai'i
- Edwin Bennett (potter) (1818–1908), English American pioneer of the pottery industry and art in the United States
- Edwin Bennett (cricketer) (1893–1929), English cricketer
- Edwin Keppel Bennett (1887–1958), English writer, poet, Germanist and academic
- Edwin Biedermann (1877–1929), British real tennis player
- Edwin Birdsong (1941–2019), American keyboardist and organist
- Edwin Booth (1833–1893), American Shakespearean actor
- Edwin H. Brainard (1882–1957), American Marine aviation pioneer
- Edwin Bramall (1923–2019), Chief of the Defence Staff of the British Armed Forces
- Edwin Cardona (born 1992), Colombian professional footballer
- Edwin Cassiani (born 1972), Colombian boxer
- Edwin Catmull (born 1945), American computer scientist, animator, and co-founder of Pixar
- Edwin Centeno (1981–2010), Peruvian race walker
- Edwin Cerrillo (born 2000), American professional soccer player
- Edwin Chadwick (1800–1890), British social reformer
- Edwin Cheney (1869—1942), American electrical engineer
- Edwin Clarke (1919–1996), British neurologist and medical historian
- Edwin Cole, multiple people
- Edwin Corley (1931–1981), American novelist
- Edwin G. Corr (1934–2026), American diplomat
- Edwin L. Cox, American oilman and philanthropist from Dallas, Texas
- Edwin M. Cronk (1918–2020), American diplomat
- Edwin Davies (1946–2018), British businessman and philanthropist
- Edwin Denby (1903–1983), American poet, novelist, dance critic
- Edwin Denby (1870–1929), American lawyer and politician
- Edwin Díaz (born 1994), Puerto Rican professional baseball player
- Edwin Edwards, multiple people
- Edwin L. Elwood (1847–1907), American soldier
- Edwin Encarnación (born 1983), Dominican baseball player
- Edwin Engelhart (born 1976), Dutch basketball player
- Edwin Escobar (born 1992), Venezuelan baseball player
- Edwin L. Felter (1917–2004), justice of the New Mexico Supreme Court
- Edwin Feulner (1941–2025), American political scientist
- Edwin Henry Fitler (1825–1896), American businessman and politician
- Edwin E. Floyd (1924–1990), American mathematician
- Edwin M. Gardner (1845–1935), American painter
- Edwin Ghazal, also known as Edwin (musician), Canadian musician
- Edwin Goedhart (born 1962), American politician
- Edwin Norman Hartshorn (1835–1901), American politician and educator
- Edwin Haslam (1932–2013), British physical organic chemist
- Edwin Hawkins (1943–2018), American musician and singer
- E. L. B. Hurulle (1919–2009), Sri Lankan Sinhala diplomat, provincial governor
- Edwin N. Hubbell (1815–1897), American politician
- Edwin Hubble (1889–1953), American astronomer
- Edwin Jackson (baseball) (born 1983), American baseball player
- Edwin Joseph (born 2005), American football player
- Edwin R. Keedy (1880–1958), American Dean of the University of Pennsylvania Law School
- Edwin Lefèvre (1871–1943), American journalist, writer, and diplomat
- Edwin Lutyens (1869–1944), British architect
- Edwin Masuge (born 2000), Motswana sprinter
- Edwin H. May Jr. (1924–2002), American politician
- Edwin C. May, American parapsychologist
- Edwin May (1823–1880), American architect in Indiana
- Edwin McCain (born 1970), American musician
- Edwin McMillan (1907-1991), American chemist and Nobel Prize winner
- Edwin Meese (born 1931), American attorney general
- Edwin Moses (born 1955), American hurdler
- Edwin Mosquera (footballer) (born 2001), Colombian footballer
- Edwin Mosquera (weightlifter) (1985–2017), Colombian weightlifter
- Edwin Newman (1919–2010), American newscaster and journalist
- Edwin Noyes, American politician
- Edwin Olivarez (born 1963), Filipino politician
- Edwin Orozco (born 1982), Colombian road cyclist
- Edwin Poots (born 1965), British politician
- Edwin Portillo (born 1962), Salvadoran footballer and manager
- Edwin Quilagury (born 1977), Venezuelan football manager
- Edwin Alfred Rickards (1872–1920), British architect
- Edwin Rist, American flautist and fly-tyer
- Edwin Schlossberg (born 1945), American designer, author, and artist
- Edwin Siu (born 1977), Hong Kong actor and singer
- Edwin Spanier (1921–1996), American mathematician
- Edwin Spillman (born 2005), Sierra Leonean-American football player
- Edwin Stanton (1814–1869), American lawyer and politician
- Edwin Starr (1942–2003), American soul music singer
- Edwin Sutherland (1883–1950), American sociologist and criminologist
- Edwin Thomas, multiple people
- Edwin Warren Toole (1893–1972), American lawyer and public official
- Edwin Torres, multiple people
- Edwin Tsai, Hong Kong former tennis player
- Edwin Tsitsi (1925–1997), Nauruan politician
- Edwin van der Sar (born 1970), Dutch football player
- Edwin Vurens (born 1968), Dutch football player
- Edwin Walker, multiple people
- Ed. Weinberger (born 1945), American screenwriter and television producer
- Edwin Wijeyeratne (1889–1968), Sri Lankan cabinet minister
- Edwin Bidwell Wilson (1879–1964), American mathematician
- Edwin (director) (born 1978), Indonesian filmmaker

== Fictional and mythical characters ==
- Edwin Drood, main character in The Mystery of Edwin Drood, an unfinished novel by Charles Dickens.
- Deputy Edwin Durland, in Gravity Falls, an animated television series
- Edwin Jarvis, a Marvel Comics supporting character
- Edwin Kingston, a character in the television series Matlock, played by Sam Anderson
- Edwin Murray, the maker of the Mimic in Five Nights at Freddy's, a horror video game series
- Edwin Payne, one of the Ghost detectives in Dead Boy Detectives a comic book written by Neil Gaiman also adapted as a Netflix TV series
- Aun (known as Edwin the Old in English), mythical Swedish king
- Edwin, a puppet character in Pajanimals, a children's television series
- Edwin, a character from the horror comic series Witch Creek Road
- Edwin Odesseiron, an evil conjurer in the Baldur's Gate and Baldur's Gate II: Shadows of Amn video games
