= Edwina =

- Gender: Female

Origin
- Meaning: rich friend

Other names
- Related names: Edwin

The name Edwina is a feminine form of the male name Edwin, which derives from Old English and means "rich friend." Edwin was a popular name until the time of the Norman Conquest, then fell out of favour until Victorian times.

== People ==
- Edwina Bartholomew (born 1983), Australian journalist
- Edwina Benner (1885–1955), American politician
- Edwina Bone (born 1988), Australian field hockey player
- Edwina Booth (1909–1991), American actress
- Edwina Brown (born 1978), American former basketball player and current college assistant coach
- Edwina Chamier (1890–1981), Canadian Alpine skiing Olympic champion
- Edwina Cornish, Australian biologist
- Edwina Currie (born 1946), British writer, broadcaster and former Member of Parliament
- Edwina P. Dalton (born 1936), American politician
- Edwina Eustis Dick (1908–1997), American contralto
- Edwina Dumm (1910–2007), American comic strip artist
- Edwina Dunn (born 1958), English entrepreneur
- Edwina Hume Fallis (1876–1957), American educator, writer, toy designer
- Edwina Findley (born 1980), American actress
- Edwina Garcia (born 1944), American politician
- Edwina Grima (born 1969), Maltese judge
- Lady Edwina Grosvenor (born 1981), British prison reformer
- Edwina Hart (born 1957), Welsh Assembly Minister for Social Justice
- Edwina Hayes (born 1973), English singer-songwriter
- Edwina Keane (born 1990), Irish camogie player
- Edwina Kennedy (born 1959), Australian golfer
- Edwina Kruse (1848–1930), American educator
- Edwina Lau (born 1965), Hong Kong police officer
- Edwina McGrail (born 1950), Welsh artist
- Edwina Donnelly Mitchell (1894–1968), American lawyer and prison superintendent
- Edwina Mountbatten (1901–1960), English heiress and wife of Admiral Louis Mountbatten
- Edwina Palmer (born 1955), Japanese associate professor
- Edwina Pettway (born 1950), American artist
- Edwina Pio, New Zealand academic
- Edwina Rogers (born 1964), American Lobbyist
- Edwina Sandys (born 1938), British artist
- Edwina Spicer (born 1948), Zimbabwean journalist
- Edwina Stewart (1934–2020), Northern Irish communist and civil-rights activist
- Edwina Tops-Alexander (born 1974), Australian equestrian rider
- Edwina von Gal, American landscaper
- Edwina Whitney (1868–1970), American librarian
- Edwina Florence Wills (1915–2002), American artist
- Edwina Starr, (Born 1986), Native American

== Fictional characters ==
- Edwina Brown, in the film National Velvet (1944), played by Angela Lansbury
- Edwina Chicken, a minor character in the film Chicken Run (2000)
- Edwina Cutwater, in the film All of Me (1984), played by Lily Tomlin
- Edwina Ferguson, in the M*A*S*H episode "Edwina"
- Edwina Fulton, in the movie Monkey Business played by Ginger Rogers (1952)
- Edwina Lewis, on the soap opera One Life to Live
- Edwina Lionheart, played by Diana Rigg in the film Theatre of Blood
- Edwina "Ed" McDunnough, in the movie Raising Arizona, played by Holly Hunter
- Edwina Moira, in the Thief computer game series
- Edina Monsoon, born Edwina, the main character of the BBC television series Absolutely Fabulous, played by Jennifer Saunders
- Edwina Richese, in the novel Dune: House Atreides
- Edwina Sharma, on the streaming television series Bridgerton played by Charithra Chandran
- Edwina Spoonapple, in the musical Dear Edwina
- Edwina Winston, on The Simpsons (former lover of Abraham Simpson)
- Edwina, an animated character in the television series My Friend Rabbit
