= Edvin =

- Gender: Male

Other gender
- Feminine: Edvina

Origin
- Origin: Europe
- Meaning: Wealthy friend

Other names
- Related names: Edwin, Edvīns, Audun

Edvin is a male given name.

In the Balkans, Edvin is popular among Bosniaks and Croats in the former Yugoslav nations. It is also popular among Albanians and Bulgarians. The name is a modification to the name Edwin, and it holds the same meaning of "wealthy friend." This region also has a female equivalent: Edvina.

== Given name ==
- Edvin Alten (1876–1967), Norwegian judge
- Edvin Anger (born 2002), Swedish cross-country skier
- Edvin Austbø (born 2005), Norwegian footballer
- Edvin Biuković (1969–1999), Croatian comics artist
- Edvin Csabai (born 1976), Hungarian marathon canoeist
- Edvin Hagberg (1875–1947), Swedish sailor and Olympic competitor
- Edvin Hevonkoski (1923–2009), Finnish sculptor and contemporary artist
- Edvin Kallstenius (1881–1967), Swedish composer and arranger
- Edvin Karlsson (1883-1932), Swedish politician
- Edvin Kurtulus (born 2000), Swedish professional footballer
- Edvin Laine (1905–1989), Finnish film director
- Edvin Landsem (1925–2004), Norwegian cross country skier
- Edvin Liveric (born 1970), Croatian actor
- Edvin Kanka Ćudić (born 1988), Bosnian human rights activist
- Edvin Marton (born 1974), Hungarian composer and violinist
- Edvin Mattiasson (1890–1975), Swedish wrestler
- Edvin Ozolin (born 1939), Soviet-Russian sprinter
- Edvin Paulsen (1889–1963), Norwegian gymnast
- Edvin Kristaq Rama (born 1964), Albanian politician
- Edvin Ryding (born 2003), Swedish actor
- Edvin Sugarev (born 1953), Bulgarian politician
- Edvin Tiemroth (1915–1984), Danish actor and film director
- Edvin Wide (1896–1996), Swedish long-distance runner
