= 2026 Ole Miss Rebels football team =

American college football season

2026 Ole Miss Rebels football
- Conference: Southeastern Conference

Ranking
- Coaches: No. 16
- AP: No. 25
- CFP: No. 25
- Record: 7–4 (4–4 SEC)
- Head coach: Pete Golding (1st season)
- Offensive coordinator: John David Baker (3rd season)
- Co-offensive coordinator: Cody Woodiel (1st season)
- Offensive scheme: Veer and shoot
- Defensive coordinator: Bryan Brown (3rd season)
- Co-defensive coordinator: Marcus Woodson (1st season)
- Base defense: Multiple 4–2–5
- Home stadium: Vaught–Hemingway Stadium

Uniform
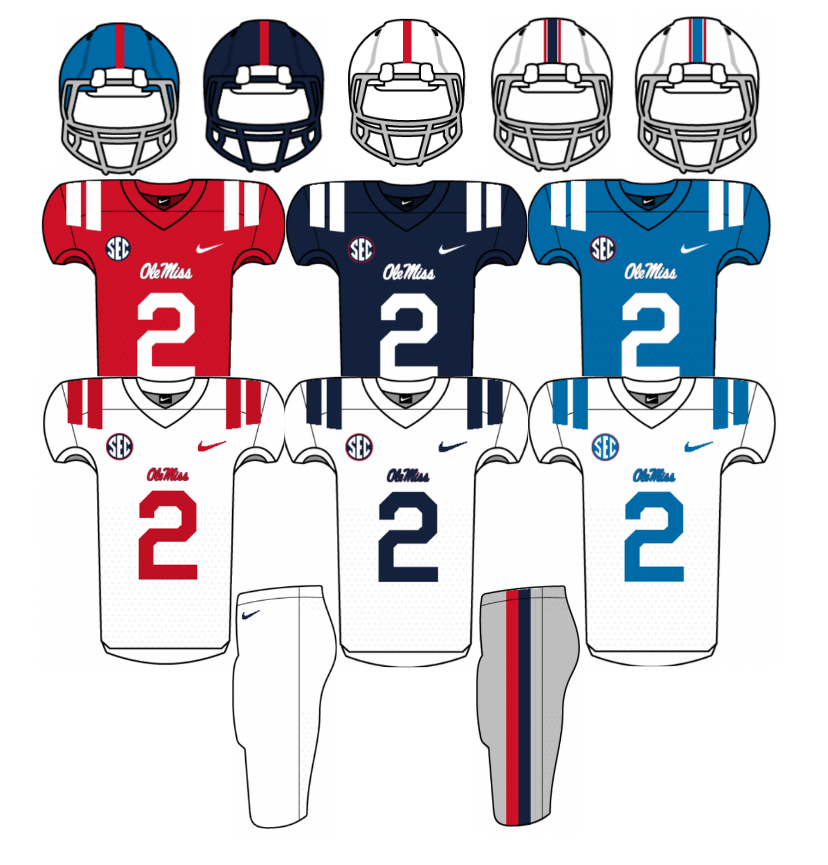

2026 Southeastern Conference football standings
	Conf.			Overall
Team	W		L	W		L
No. 1 Georgia y	8	–	1	10	–	1
No. 5 Texas	6	–	2	9	–	2
No. 9 Tennessee	6	–	2	9	–	2
No. 3 Alabama	6	–	2	9	–	2
No. 22 Oklahoma	5	–	3	7	–	4
No. 24 Florida	5	–	4	7	–	4
No. 16 Kentucky	5	–	4	7	–	4
No. 25 Ole Miss	4	–	4	7	–	4
Auburn	4	–	4	7	–	4
Missouri	4	–	4	7	–	4
No. 21 South Carolina	4	–	5	6	–	5
LSU	3	–	5	6	–	5
Mississippi State	2	–	6	5	–	6
Arkansas	2	–	6	4	–	7
Texas A&M	1	–	7	4	–	7
Vanderbilt	1	–	7	4	–	7
Championship: Georgia vs TBD
^ – College Football Playoff participant; $ – Conference champion; y – Championship game participant; As of November 22, 2026; Rankings from CFP rankings

The 2026 Ole Miss Rebels football team represents the University of Mississippi (Ole Miss) in the Southeastern Conference (SEC) during the 2026 NCAA Division I FBS football season. The Rebels are led by head coach Pete Golding in his first full season as head coach and play home games at Vaught–Hemingway Stadium located in Oxford, Mississippi.

== Schedule ==
Date	Time	Opponent	Rank	Site	TV	Result	Attendance
September 6	6:30 p.m.	vs. No. 24 Louisville*	No. 9	Nissan Stadium; Nashville, TN (Music City Kickoff)	ABC	W 41–38	57,390
September 12	6:45 p.m.	Charlotte*	No. 9	Vaught–Hemingway Stadium; Oxford, MS	ESPN2	W 41–9	68,134
September 19	6:30 p.m.	No. 7 LSU	No. 8	Vaught–Hemingway Stadium; Oxford, MS (Magnolia Bowl, College GameDay)	ABC	W 32–24	70,033 (Note: 70,033 sets new all-time attendance record at Vaught–Hemingway Stadium, breaking the previous record of 68,251 set on December 20, 2025 vs Tulane.)
September 26	2:30 p.m.	at No. 21 Florida	No. 4	Ben Hill Griffin Stadium; Gainesville, FL (SEC Nation)	ABC	L 28–52	90,683
October 10	2:30 p.m.	at Vanderbilt	No. 9	FirstBank Stadium; Nashville, TN (rivalry)	ESPN	W 52–17	35,000
October 17	2:30 p.m.	No. 13 Missouri	No. 9	Vaught–Hemingway Stadium; Oxford, MS	SECN	W 31–3	67,510
October 24	6:30 p.m.	at No. 19 Texas	No. 7	Darrell K Royal–Texas Memorial Stadium; Austin, TX	ABC	L 27–34	104,306
October 31	11:45 a.m.	Auburn	No. 12	Vaught–Hemingway Stadium; Oxford, MS (rivalry)	SECN	W 45–15	67,041
November 7	6:30 p.m.	No. 2 Georgia	No. 10	Vaught–Hemingway Stadium; Oxford, MS (SEC Nation)	ABC	L 7–42	68,814
November 15	12:00 p.m.	at Oklahoma	No. 19	Gaylord Family Oklahoma Memorial Stadium; Norman, OK	SECN	L 17–24	83,226
November 21	11:00 a.m.	Wofford*	No. 25	Vaught–Hemingway Stadium; Oxford, MS	SECN+	W 59–17	65,250
November 27	11:00 a.m.	Mississippi State		Vaught–Hemingway Stadium; Oxford, MS (Egg Bowl)	ABC		
*Non-conference game; Rankings from AP Poll (and CFP Rankings, after November 3) - Released prior to game; All times are in Central time

== Rankings ==
Ranking movements Legend: ██ Increase in ranking ██ Decrease in ranking ( ) = First-place votes
	Week															
Poll	Pre	1	2	3	4	5	6	7	8	9	10	11	12	13	14	Final
AP	9	9	8	4 (3)	9	9	9	7	12	12	19	25				
Coaches	10	11	9	6	12	11	10	7	12	12	17	16				
CFP	Not released									10	19	25				Not released

== Offseason ==
=== NFL draft ===
Player	Position	Team	Round	Pick
De'Zhaun Stribling	WR	San Francisco 49ers	2	33
Jayden Williams	T	Arizona Cardinals	7	217
Harrison Wallace III	WR	Arizona Cardinals	Undrafted	
Wydett Williams Jr.	S	Arizona Cardinals	Undrafted	
Diego Pounds	OT	Baltimore Ravens	Undrafted	
Tahj Chambers	LB	Indianapolis Colts	Undrafted	
Zxavian Harris	DT	New Orleans Saints	Undrafted	
Kapena Gushiken	S	Philadelphia Eagles	Undrafted	
Dae'Quan Wright	TE	Philadelphia Eagles	Undrafted	

== Game summaries ==
=== vs. No. 24 Louisville ===
No. 24 Louisville Cardinals (0–0) vs. No. 9 Ole Miss Rebels (0–0) – Game summary

Quarter	1	2	3	4	Total
No. 24 Cardinals	3	3	18	14	38
No. 9 Rebels	0	10	14	17	41

at Nissan Stadium • Nashville, Tennessee

- Date: September 6
- Game time: 6:30 p.m. CDT
- Game weather: Sunny • Temperature: 88 °F (31 °C) • Wind: NE at 9 miles per hour (14 km/h)
- Game attendance: 57,390
- Referee: Cravonne Barrett
- TV announcers (ABC): Sean McDonough, Greg McElroy and Katie George

Game information

First quarter

- LOU – Carson Hilbert 25-yard field goal, 7:19. Cardinals 3–0. Drive: 10 plays, 47 yards, 6:33.

Second quarter

- MISS – Lucas Carneiro 43-yard field goal, 14:51. Tied 3–3. Drive: 11 plays, 60 yards, 3:34.
- MISS – Kewan Lacy 1-yard run (Lucas Carneiro kick), 10:38. Rebels 10–3. Drive: 4 plays, 12 yards, 1:13.
- LOU – Carson Hilbert 46-yard field goal, 0:06. Rebels 10–6. Drive: 8 plays, 42 yards, 1:37.

Third quarter

- LOU – Tre Richardson 30-yard run (Carson Hilbert kick), 10:51. Cardinals 13–10. Drive: 9 plays, 77 yards, 4:01.
- MISS – Deuce Alexander 62-yard pass from Trinidad Chambliss (Lucas Carneiro kick), 8:53. Rebels 17–13. Drive: 5 plays, 62 yards, 1:58.
- LOU – Carson Hilbter 45-yard field goal, 2:22. Rebels 17–16. Drive: 6 plays, 51 yards, 2:25.
- MISS – Deuce Alexander 62-yard pass from Trinidad Chambliss (Lucas Carneiro kick), 1:01. Rebels 24–16. Drive: 3 plays, 75 yards, 1:21.
- LOU – Tre Richardson 62-yard pass from Lincoln Kienholz (Lincoln Kienholz–Lawayne McCoy pass), 0:16. Tied 24–24. Drive: 2 plays, 85 yards, 0:41.

Fourth quarter

- MISS – Caleb Odom 35-yard pass from Trinidad Chambliss (Lucas Carneiro kick), 12:45. Rebels 31–24. Drive: 6 plays, 75 yards, 2:31.
- MISS – Trinidad Chambliss 5-yard run (Lucas Carneiro kick), 6:43. Rebels 38–24. Drive: 9 plays, 54 yards, 3:51.
- LOU – Lawayne McCoy 54-yard pass from Lincoln Kienholz (Carson Hilbert kick), 4:42. Rebels 38–31. Drive: 6 plays, 35 yards, 2:01.
- LOU – Lincoln Kienholz 7-yard run (Carson Hilbert kick), 1:28. Tied 38–38. Drive: 7 plays, 77 yards, 1:41.
- MISS – Lucas Carneiro 48-yard field goal, 0:00. Rebels 41–38. Drive: 8 plays, 40 yards, 1:28.

Statistics	LOU	MISS
First downs	20	24
Plays–yards	68–469	78–488
Rushes–yards	39–162	41–152
Passing yards	307	336
Passing: comp–att–int	18–29–0	21–37–1
Turnovers	0	2
Time of possession	30:58	29:02

Team	Category	Player	Statistics
Louisville	Passing	Lincoln Kienholz	18/29, 307 yards, 2 TD
Louisville	Rushing	Lincoln Kienholz	14 carries, 69 yards, TD
Louisville	Receiving	Tre Richardson	4 receptions, 83 yards, TD
Ole Miss	Passing	Trinidad Chambliss	21/37, 336 yards, 3 TD, INT
Ole Miss	Rushing	Kewan Lacy	17 carries, 61 yards, TD
Ole Miss	Receiving	Deuce Alexander	5 receptions, 159 yards, 2 TD

=== vs. Charlotte ===
Charlotte 49ers (0–1) at No. 9 Ole Miss Rebels (1–0) – Game summary

Quarter	1	2	3	4	Total
49ers	0	0	6	3	9
No. 9 Rebels	7	20	0	14	41

at Vaught–Hemingway Stadium • Oxford, Mississippi

- Date: September 12
- Game time: 6:45 p.m. CDT
- Game weather: Cloudy • Temperature: 81 °F (27 °C) • Wind: S at 2 miles per hour (3.2 km/h)
- Game attendance: 68,134
- Referee: Jeff Heaser
- TV announcers (ESPN2): Roy Philpott, Brock Osweiler and Lauren Sisler

Game information

First quarter

- MISS – Kewan Lacy 9-yard run (Lucas Carneiro kick), 10:39. Rebels 7–0. Drive: 10 plays, 75 yards, 4:21.

Second quarter

- MISS – Johntay Cook II 14-yard pass from Trinidad Chambliss (Lucas Carneiro kick), 13:55. Rebels 14–0. Drive: 7 plays, 67 yards, 2:40.
- MISS – Kewan Lacy 2-yard run (Lucas Carneiro kick), 8:39. Rebels 21–0. Drive: 8 plays, 74 yards, 3:16.
- MISS – Lucas Carneiro 57-yard field goal, 4:32. Rebels 24–0. Drive: 6 plays, 15 yards, 2:37.
- MISS – Lucas Carneiro 41-yard field goal, 0:00. Rebels 27–0. Drive: 2 plays, 14 yards, 0:04.

Third quarter

- CLT – Ian Kelly 28-yard field goal, 10:23. Rebels 27–3. Drive: 8 plays, 64 yards, 4:37.
- CLT – Ian Kelly 24-yard field goal, 1:43. Rebels 27–6. Drive: 12 plays, 59 yards, 6:49.

Fourth quarter

- MISS – Horatio Fields 9-yard pass from Trinidad Chambliss (Lucas Carneiro kick), 14:49. Rebels 34–6. Drive: 7 plays, 75 yards, 1:54.
- CLT – Ian Kelly 28-yard field goal, 9:53. Rebels 34–9. Drive: 8 plays, 64 yards, 4:56.
- MISS – Deuce Knight 7-yard run (Lucas Carneiro kick), 7:10. Rebels 41–9. Drive: 8 plays, 70 yards, 2:37.

Statistics	CLT	MISS
First downs	17	25
Plays–yards	61–322	58–420
Rushes–yards	33–143	24–127
Passing yards	179	293
Passing: comp–att–int	20–28–1	27–34–1
Turnovers	1	1
Time of possession	37:14	22:46

Team	Category	Player	Statistics
Charlotte	Passing	Cole Gonzales	14/21, 128 yards, INT
Charlotte	Rushing	Chance Williams	9 carries, 74 yards
Charlotte	Receiving	Derrick Eley	2 receptions, 56 yards
Ole Miss	Passing	Trinidad Chambliss	23/26, 225 yards, 2 TD
Ole Miss	Rushing	Kewan Lacy	13 carries, 87 yards, 2 TD
Ole Miss	Receiving	Deuce Alexander	8 receptions, 76 yards

=== vs. No. 7 LSU (Magnolia Bowl) ===
No. 7 LSU Tigers (2–0) at No. 8 Ole Miss Rebels (2–0) – Game summary

Quarter	1	2	3	4	Total
No. 7 Tigers	0	7	14	3	24
No. 8 Rebels	10	14	0	8	32

at Vaught–Hemingway Stadium • Oxford, Mississippi

- Date: September 19
- Game time: 6:49 p.m. CDT
- Game weather: Sunny • Temperature: 92 °F (33 °C) • Wind: SE at 6 miles per hour (9.7 km/h)
- Game attendance: 70,033
- Referee: David Smith
- TV announcers (ABC): Chris Fowler, Kirk Herbstreit, Holly Rowe, and Laura Rutledge
- Report: Official report

Statistics	LSU	MISS
First downs	19	25
Plays–yards	70–330	73–426
Rushes–yards	43–172	25–63
Passing yards	158	363
Passing: comp–att–int	16–27–1	33–48–1
Turnovers	1	1
Time of possession	30:15	29:45

Team	Category	Player	Statistics
LSU	Passing	Sam Leavitt	16/27, 158 yards, TD, INT
LSU	Rushing	Dilin Jones	23 carries, 106 yards, TD
LSU	Receiving	Trey'Dez Green	4 receptions, 60 yards
Ole Miss	Passing	Trinidad Chambliss	33/48, 363 yards, 2 TD, INT
Ole Miss	Rushing	Kewan Lacy	9 carries, 43 yards, TD
Ole Miss	Receiving	Traylon Ray	7 receptions, 115 yards, TD

After Lane Kiffin's departure from Ole Miss to LSU in 2025, college football fans eagerly awaited Kiffin's return to Ole Miss and Oxford, Mississippi. Both LSU and Ole Miss came into the week 3 matchup with a 2-0 record, with LSU and Ole Miss ranked #7 and #8 in the AP poll, respectively. College GameDay announced they would be attending the game in Oxford. According to law enforcement sources, horseback police units from New Orleans and Jackson, Mississippi were brought in to Oxford for security, crowd control and fan management. In the leadup to the game, Kiffin said in a press conference: "I told the players today, you don't have anything to worry about as far as like attention on you all week. There's just going to be so much attention, hatred, everything on me, I said, 'You just get to go play, I said really the pressure's on [Ole Miss]". In the game, Ole Miss went up 17–0 and led 24–7 at halftime. They did not score at all in the 3rd quarter as LSU cut the deficit to 24–21 and eventually tied the game at 24 a piece early in the 4th quarter. Ole Miss took the lead for good with 6:14 to go thanks to a 14-yard rushing touchdown from Trinidad Chambliss and a 2-point run from JT Lindsey. LSU ended up getting the ball back and eventually got all the way to the red zone in Ole Miss territory but could not score as Sam Leavitt threw an interception with 59 seconds left. Ole Miss won the game 32–24.

=== at No. 21 Florida ===
No. 4 Ole Miss Rebels (3–0) at No. 21 Florida Gators (3–0) – Game summary

Quarter	1	2	3	4	Total
No. 4 Rebels	0	6	15	7	28
No. 21 Gators	10	7	14	21	52

at Ben Hill Griffin Stadium • Gainesville, Florida

- Date: September 26
- Game time: 2:30 p.m. CDT
- Game weather: Sunny • Temperature: 82 °F (28 °C) • Wind: E at 5 miles per hour (8.0 km/h)
- Game attendance: 90,683
- Referee: Steve Marlow
- TV announcers (ABC): Sean McDonough, Greg McElroy, and Katie George
- Report: Official report

Game information

First quarter

- FLA – Jadan Baugh 4-yard run (Patrick Durkin kick), 10:53. Gators 7–0. Drive: 8 plays, 65 yards, 3:59.
- FLA – Patrick Durkin 49-yard field goal, 9:00. Gators 10–0. Drive: 4 plays, 0 yards, 0:16.

Second quarter

- OLE – Lucas Carneiro 36-yard field goal, 10:13. Gators 10–3. Drive: 5 plays, 30 yards, 2:21.
- FLA – Jadan Baugh 2-yard run (Patrick Durkin kick), 2:51. Gators 17–3. Drive: 15 plays, 87 yards, 7:17.
- OLE – Lucas Carneiro 46-yard field goal, 1:11. Gators 17–6. Drive: 8 plays, 47 yards, 1:40.

Third quarter

- OLE – Trinidad Chambliss 8-yard run (Horatio Fields pass), 13:03. Gators 17–14. Drive: 5 plays, 80 yards, 01:53.
- FLA – Duke Clark 45-yard run (Patrick Durkin kick), 11:32. Gators 24–14. Drive: 4 plays, 87 yards, 1:23.
- OLE – Trinidad Chambliss 10-yard run (Lucas Carneiro kick), 5:21. Gators 24–21. Drive: 14 plays, 74 yards, 6:05.
- FLA – Aaron Philo 1-yard run (Patrick Durkin kick), 3:45. Gators 31–21. Drive: 3 plays, 26 yards, 1:25.

Fourth quarter

- FLA – Dallas Wilson 6-yard run (Patrick Durkin kick), 13:38. Gators 38–21. Drive: 7 plays, 57 yards, 4:03.
- OLE – Deuce Alexander 2-yard pass from Trinidad Chambliss (Lucas Carneiro kick), 12:09. Gators 38–28. Drive: 4 plays, 76 yards, 1:21.
- FLA – Amir Jackson 5-yard pass from Aaron Philo (Patrick Durkin kick), 9:19. Gators 45–28. Drive: 5 plays, 64 yards, 2:50.
- FLA – Jadan Baugh 2-yard run (Patrick Durkin kick), 4:00. Gators 52–28. Drive: 8 plays, 63 yards, 4:42.

Statistics	MISS	FLA
First downs	25	27
Plays–yards	61–426	76–498
Rushes–yards	27–128	53–302
Passing yards	298	196
Passing: comp–att–int	25–34–1	16–23–0
Turnovers	2	0
Time of possession	23:01	36:59

Team	Category	Player	Statistics
Ole Miss	Passing	Trinidad Chambliss	25/34, 298 yards, TD, INT
Ole Miss	Rushing	Trinidad Chambliss	7 carries, 44 yards, 2 TD, FUM
Ole Miss	Receiving	Deuce Alexander	7 receptions, 134 yards, TD
Florida	Passing	Aaron Philo	16/23, 196 yards, TD
Florida	Rushing	Jadan Baugh	29 carries, 142 yards, 3 TD
Florida	Receiving	Eric Singleton Jr.	1 reception, 38 yards

=== at Vanderbilt (rivalry) ===
No. 9 Ole Miss Rebels (3–1) at Vanderbilt Commodores (3–2) – Game summary

Quarter	1	2	3	4	Total
No. 9 Rebels	14	28	0	10	52
Commodores	3	0	7	7	17

at FirstBank Stadium • Nashville, Tennessee

- Date: October 10
- Game time: 2:30 p.m. CDT
- Game weather: Rain • Temperature: 63 °F (17 °C) • Wind: NE at 12 miles per hour (19 km/h)
- Game attendance: 35,000
- Referee: David Smith
- TV announcers (ESPN): Joe Tessitore, Jesse Palmer, and Kris Budden
- Report: Official report

Statistics	MISS	VAN
First downs	22	19
Plays–yards	65–409	74–343
Rushes–yards	36–196	37–103
Passing yards	213	240
Passing: comp–att––int	20–30–1	21–37–2
Turnovers	1	4
Time of possession	26:04	33:56

Team	Category	Player	Statistics
Ole Miss	Passing	Trinidad Chambliss	20/30, 213 yards, 3 TD, INT
Ole Miss	Rushing	Makhi Frazier	13 carries, 73 yards
Ole Miss	Receiving	Deuce Alexander	5 receptions, 74 yards, TD
Vanderbilt	Passing	Jared Curtis	19/32, 222 yards, 1 TD, 2 INT
Vanderbilt	Rushing	Makhilyn Young	9 carries, 37 yards
Vanderbilt	Receiving	Ja'Cory Thomas	3 receptions, 60 yards, TD

=== vs. No. 13 Missouri ===
No. 13 Missouri Tigers (5–1) at No. 9 Ole Miss Rebels (4–1) – Game summary

Quarter	1	2	3	4	Total
No. 13 Tigers	3	0	0	0	3
No. 9 Rebels	7	14	0	10	31

at Vaught–Hemingway Stadium • Oxford, Mississippi

- Date: October 17
- Game time: 2:30 p.m. CDT
- Game weather: Sunny • Temperature: 66 °F (19 °C) • Wind: NE at 15 miles per hour (24 km/h)
- Game attendance: 67,510
- Referee: Kyle Olson
- TV announcers (SECN): Matt Schumacker, Aaron Murray, and Taylor Davis
- Report: Official report

Statistics	MIZ	MISS
First downs	17	27
Plays–yards	70–378	74–498
Rushes–yards	26–39	38–257
Passing yards	339	241
Passing: comp–att–int	25–44–1	20–36–0
Turnovers	1	1
Time of possession	28:54	31:06

Team	Category	Player	Statistics
Missouri	Passing	Austin Simmons	25/44, 339 yards, 1 INT
Missouri	Rushing	Jamal Roberts	20 carries, 39 yards
Missouri	Receiving	Donovan Olugbode	9 receptions, 127 yards
Ole Miss	Passing	Trinidad Chambliss	20/36, 241 yards, 3 TD
Ole Miss	Rushing	Kewan Lacy	16 carries, 122 yards
Ole Miss	Receiving	Caleb Cunningham	3 receptions, 61 yards, TD

=== at No. 19 Texas ===
No. 7 Ole Miss Rebels (5–1) at No. 19 Texas Longhorns (4–2) – Game summary

Quarter	1	2	3	4	Total
No. 7 Rebels	3	0	14	10	27
No. 19 Longhorns	10	14	0	10	34

at Darrell K Royal–Texas Memorial Stadium • Austin, Texas

- Date: October 24
- Game time: 6:49 p.m. CDT
- Game weather: Sunny • Temperature: 82 °F (28 °C)
- Game attendance: 104,306
- Referee: Daniel Gautreaux
- TV announcers (ABC): Chris Fowler (play-by-play), Kirk Herbstreit (analyst) and Holly Rowe (sideline reporter)
- Report: Official report

Game information

First quarter

- (8:27) TEX — Gianni Spetic 23-yard field goal (Drive: 12 plays, 69 yards, 5:51; TEX 3-0)
- (6:01) MISS — Lucas Carneiro 46-yard field goal (Drive: 7 plays, 46 yards, 2:26; Tied 3-3)
- (0:55) TEX — Arch Manning 2-yard run (Gianni Spetic kick), (Drive: 4 plays, 60 yards, 1:24; TEX 10-3)

Second quarter

- (12:38) TEX — Ryan Wingo 50-yard pass from Arch Manning (Gianni Spetic kick), (Drive: 5 plays, 61 yards, 1:57; TEX 17-3)
- (9:21) TEX — Michael Terry III 2-yard run (Gianni Spetic kick), (Drive: 6 plays, 62 yards, 2:22; TEX 24-3)

Third quarter

- (13:19) MISS — Kam Franklin 0-yard fumble recovery (Lucas Carneiro kick), (Drive: 4 plays, 12 yards, 1:41; TEX 24-10)
- (6:46) MISS — Horatio Fields 6-yard pass from Trinidad Chambliss (Lucas Carneiro kick), (Drive: 10 plays, 80 yards, 4:38; TEX 24-17)

Fourth quarter

- (13:57) MISS — Horatio Fields 27-yard pass from Trinidad Chambliss (Lucas Carneiro kick), (Drive: 4 plays, 71 yards, 1:13; Tied 24-24)
- (8:04) TEX — Arch Manning 1-yard run (Gianni Spetic kick), (Drive: 6 plays, 80 yards, 3:19; TEX 31-24)
- (2:25) TEX — Gianni Spetic 33-yard field goal (Drive: 8 plays, 44 yards, 3:56; TEX 34-24)
- (1:22) MISS — Lucas Carneiro 39-yard field goal (Drive: 6 plays, 53 yards, 1:03; TEX 34-27)

Statistics	MISS	TEX
First downs	23	23
Plays–yards	82–363	71–419
Rushes–yards	30–113	42–207
Passing yards	250	212
Passing: comp–att–int	25–52–3	18–30–2
Time of possession	25:03	34:57

Team	Category	Player	Statistics
Ole Miss	Passing	Trinidad Chambliss	25/52, 250 yards, 2 TD, 3 INT
Ole Miss	Rushing	Makhi Frazier	6 carries, 47 yards
Ole Miss	Receiving	Deuce Alexander	8 receptions, 87 yards
Texas	Passing	Arch Manning	18/30, 212 yards, TD, 2 INT
Texas	Rushing	Raleek Brown	23 carries, 157 yards
Texas	Receiving	Ryan Wingo	7 receptions, 111 yards, TD

=== vs. Auburn (rivalry) ===
Auburn Tigers (4–3) at No. 12 Ole Miss Rebels (5–2) – Game summary

Quarter	1	2	3	4	Total
Tigers	0	9	6	0	15
No. 12 Rebels	0	14	10	21	45

at Vaught–Hemingway Stadium • Oxford, Mississippi

- Date: October 31
- Game time: 11:47 a.m.
- Game weather: Cloudy • Temperature: 72 °F (22 °C) • Wind: SE 8 miles per hour (13 km/h)
- Game attendance: 67,041
- Referee: Jason Autrey
- TV announcers (SECN): Matt Schumacker, Aaron Murray, and Taylor Davis
- Report: Official report

Statistics	AUB	MISS
First downs	24	31
Plays–yards	70–312	84–487
Rushes–yards	27–63	49–224
Passing yards	249	263
Passing: comp–att–int	29–43–0	22–35–1
Time of possession	27:22	32:38

Team	Category	Player	Statistics
Auburn	Passing	Byrum Brown	25/38, 195 yards, TD
Auburn	Rushing	Jeremiah Cobb	7 carries, 35 yards
Auburn	Receiving	Chas Nimrod	4 receptions, 62 yards, TD
Ole Miss	Passing	Trinidad Chambliss	22/34, 263 yards, 2 TD, INT
Ole Miss	Rushing	Shekai Mills-Knight	16 carries, 71 yards, TD
Ole Miss	Receiving	Horatio Fields	6 receptions, 73 yards, TD

=== vs. No. 2 Georgia ===
No. 2 Georgia Bulldogs (7–1) at No. 10 Ole Miss Rebels (6–2) – Game summary

Quarter	1	2	3	4	Total
No. 2 Bulldogs	14	14	7	7	42
No. 10 Rebels	0	0	0	7	7

at Vaught–Hemingway Stadium • Oxford, Mississippi

- Date: November 7
- Game time: 6:44 p.m.
- Game weather: Cloudy • Temperature: 47 °F (8 °C) • Wind: N 2 miles per hour (3.2 km/h)
- Game attendance: 68,814
- Referee: James Carter
- TV announcers (ABC): Sean McDonough, Greg McElroy, and Katie George
- Report: Official report

Game information

First quarter

- (10:16) UGA – Craig Dandridge 4-yard run, Peyton Woodring kick (Drive: 7 plays, 72 yards, 4:00; Georgia 7–0)
- (6:18) UGA – Talyn Taylor 58-yard pass from Gunner Stockton, Peyton Woodring kick (Drive: 4 plays, 96 yards, 2:11; Georgia 14–0)

Second quarter

- (14:16) UGA – Ethan Barbour 3-yard pass from Gunner Stockton, Peyton Woodring kick (Drive: 9 plays, 61 yards, 4:43; Georgia 21–0)
- (2:42) UGA – Gunner Stockton 15-yard run, Peyton Woodring kick (Drive: 7 plays, 50 yards, 3:47; Georgia 28–0)

Third quarter

- (1:37) UGA – Talyn Taylor 6-yard pass from Gunner Stockton, Peyton Woodring kick (Drive: 5 plays, 22 yards, 2:58; Georgia 35–0)

Fourth quarter

- (10:43) MISS – Shekai Mills-Knight 8-yard run, Lucas Carneiro kick (Drive: 16 plays, 75 yards, 5:54; Georgia 35–7)
- (9:06) UGA – Talyn Taylor 65-yard pass from Gunner Stockton, Peyton Woodring kick (Drive: 3 plays, 75 yards, 1:37; Georgia 42–7)

Statistics	UGA	MISS
First downs	23	19
Plays–yards	63–481	69–252
Rushes–yards	48–295	31–66
Passing yards	186	186
Passing: comp–att–int	9–15–0	21–38–1
Time of possession	34:41	25:19

Team	Category	Player	Statistics
Georgia	Passing	Gunner Stockton	9/15, 186 yards, 4 TD
Georgia	Rushing	Nate Frazier	16 carries, 107 yards
Georgia	Receiving	Talyn Taylor	4 receptions, 140 yards, 3 TD
Ole Miss	Passing	Trinidad Chambliss	18/34, 170 yards, INT
Ole Miss	Rushing	Shekai Mills-Knight	13 carries, 52 yards, TD
Ole Miss	Receiving	Horatio Fields	8 receptions, 96 yards

=== at Oklahoma ===
No. 19 Ole Miss Rebels (6–3) at Oklahoma Sooners (5–4) – Game summary

Quarter	1	2	3	4	Total
No. 19 Rebels	0	7	0	10	17
Sooners	14	0	7	3	24

at Gaylord Family Oklahoma Memorial Stadium • Norman, Oklahoma

- Date: November 15
- Game time: 12:03 p.m.
- Game weather: Rain • Temperature: 45 °F (7 °C) • Wind: N 10 miles per hour (16 km/h)
- Game attendance: 83,226
- Referee: Adam Savoie
- TV announcers (SECN): Taylor Zarzour, Matt Stinchcomb, and Michella Chester
- Report: Official report

Game information

First Quarter

- (5:54) OU ― John Mateer 8 yard rush, Tate Sandell kick (Drive: 13 plays, 74 yards, 7:40; OU 7―0)
- (3:29) OU ― Isaiah Sategna III 75 yard punt return, Tate Sandell kick (Drive: 4 plays, 17 yards, 2:21; OU 14―0)

Second Quarter

- (13:27) OM ― Joshua Dye 19 yard rush, Lucas Carneiro kick (Drive: 11 plays, 75 yards, 5:02; OU 14―7)

Third Quarter

- (8:21) OU ― Jonathan Hatton Jr. 5 yard rush, Tate Sandell kick (Drive: 12 plays, 70 yards, 6:33; OU 21―7)

Fourth Quarter

- (11:45) OM ― Caleb Odom 26 yard pass from Trinidad Chambliss, Lucas Carneiro kick (Drive: 7 plays, 79 yards, 1:37; OU 21―14)
- (4:52) OU ― Tate Sandell 41 yard field goal (Drive: 12 plays, 51 yards, 6:53; OU 24―14)
- (0:42) OM — Lucas Carneiro 41 yard field goal (Drive: 11 plays, 43 yards, 2:22; OU 24—17)

Statistics	MISS	OU
First downs	19	19
Plays–yards	59–306	68–299
Rushes–yards	31–179	49–188
Passing yards	127	111
Passing: comp–att–int	14–28–0	10–19–0
Time of possession	23:29	36:31

Team	Category	Player	Statistics
Ole Miss	Passing	Trinidad Chambliss	14/27, 127 yards, TD
Ole Miss	Rushing	Trinidad Chambliss	11 carries, 84 yards
Ole Miss	Receiving	Caleb Odom	4 receptions, 56 yards, TD
Oklahoma	Passing	John Mateer	10/19, 111 yards
Oklahoma	Rushing	John Mateer	16 carries, 70 yards, TD
Oklahoma	Receiving	Rocky Beers	4 receptions, 39 yards

=== vs. Wofford (FCS) ===
Wofford Terriers (5–6) at No. 25 Ole Miss Rebels (6–4) – Game summary

Quarter	1	2	3	4	Total
Terriers (FCS)	0	0	0	0	0
No. 25 Rebels	0	0	0	0	0

at Vaught–Hemingway Stadium • Oxford, Mississippi

- Date: November 21
- TV announcers (SECN+): Richard Cross and Charlie Strong

Statistics	WOF	MISS
First downs		
Plays–yards		
Rushes–yards		
Passing yards		
Passing: comp–att–int		
Time of possession		

Team	Category	Player	Statistics
Wofford	Passing		
Wofford	Rushing		
Wofford	Receiving		
Ole Miss	Passing		
Ole Miss	Rushing		
Ole Miss	Receiving		

=== vs. Mississippi State (Egg Bowl) ===
Mississippi State Bulldogs (0–0) at Ole Miss Rebels (0–0) – Game summary

Quarter	1	2	3	4	Total
Bulldogs	0	0	0	0	0
Rebels	0	0	0	0	0

at Vaught–Hemingway Stadium • Oxford, Mississippi

- Date: November 28
- TV: ABC

Statistics	MSST	MISS
First downs		
Plays–yards		
Rushes–yards		
Passing yards		
Passing: comp–att–int		
Time of possession		

Team	Category	Player	Statistics
Mississippi State	Passing		
Mississippi State	Rushing		
Mississippi State	Receiving		
Ole Miss	Passing		
Ole Miss	Rushing		
Ole Miss	Receiving		

== Personnel ==
=== Coaching staff ===
Coach	Title	Year at Ole Miss	Previous job
Pete Golding	Head Coach	1st	Ole Miss (DC/LB)
John David Baker	OC	4th	East Carolina (OC/QB)
Bryan Brown	DC	3rd	Cincinnati (AHC/DC)
Joe Judge	HC of Offense/QB	3rd	New England Patriots (AHC)
Wes Neighbors III	S	4th	Maryland (S)
Randall Joyner	Associate HC/DL	6th	SMU (DL)
Matt Kitchens	Outside LB	3rd	Central Arkansas (DC/outside LB)
Jay Shoop	Inside LB	4th	South Florida (GA)
Marcus Woodson	Co-DC	1st	Arkansas (Co-DC/S)
John Garrison	OL/RGC	4th	NC State (OL)
Cody Woodiel	Co-OC/TE	1st	Miami (TE)
Jake Schoonover	Assistant HC/STC/Nickelbacks	4th	Arkansas State (STC)
L'Damian Washington	WR	1st	Kentucky (WR)
Frank Wilson	Senior Associate HC/RB	4th	LSU (interim HC/RB)

=== Roster ===
2026 Ole Miss Rebels Football
Quarterbacks: 2 – Deuce Knight – Redshirt Freshman (6'5, 225) – Lucedale, Mississippi; 6 – Trinidad Chambliss – Senior (6'0, 205) – Grand Rapids, Michigan; 8 – AJ Maddox – Redshirt Sophomore (6'1, 195) – Hattiesburg, Mississippi; 13 – Jack Patterson – Sophomore (6'3, 205) – Marion, Arkansas; 14 – Walker Howard – Senior (6'0, 195) – Lafayette, Louisiana; 16 – Maealiuaki Smith – Redshirt Sophomore (6'3, 205) – Sacramento, California; 19 – Rees Wise – Freshman (6'1, 210) – Austin, Texas; 23 – George Hamsley – Senior (6'4, 250) – Memphis, Tennessee; Running backs: 5 – Kewan Lacy – Junior (5'11, 205) – Dallas, Texas; 25 – Makhi Frazier – Junior (5'10, 225) – McKinney, Texas; 26 – JT Lindsey – Redshirt Freshman (5'11, 190) – Alexandria, Louisiana; 27 – Macaleb Taylor – Redshirt Freshman (5'10, 210) – Grenada, Mississippi; 28 – Joshua Dye – Junior (5'10, 200) – Gilbert, Arizona; 33 – Shekai Mills-Knight – Redshirt Freshman (6'2, 220) – Montreal, Quebec, Canada; 35 – Damarius Tayes – Freshman (5'10, 195) – DeKalb, Mississippi; 36 – Ja'Michael Jones – Freshman (5'10, 200) – Montgomery, Alabama; Wide receivers: 0 – Johntay Cook II – Senior (5'11, 190) – DeSoto, Texas; 1 – Deuce Alexander – Junior (6'0, 180) – Douglasville, Georgia (Georgia (U.S. state)); 3 – Caleb Cunningham – Redshirt Freshman (6'1, 210) – Weir, Mississippi; 7 – Traylon Ray – Redshirt Junior (6'2, 195) – Tallahassee, Florida; 11 – Horatio Fields – Senior (6'2, 210) – Douglasville, Georgia (Georgia (U.S. state)); 12 – Izaiah Hartrup – Senior (5'11, 180) – O'Fallon, Missouri; 15 – Darrell Gill Jr. – Senior (6'1, 185) – Atascocita, Texas; 22 – Cameron Miller – Sophomore (5'10, 180) – Camden, New Jersey; 47 – Anthony Aguirre – Senior (6'4, 215) – Spokane, Washington (Washington (state)); 81 – Samari Reed – Redshirt Freshman (6'2, 200) – Margate, Florida; 83 – Levi Blount – Redshirt Freshman (6'0, 190) – Oxford, Mississippi; 84 – Dillon Alfred – Redshirt Freshman (5'11, 175) – Gautier, Mississippi; 85 – Isaiah Spencer – Senior (6'2, 205) – Flora, Mississippi; 88 – Jase Mathews – Freshman (6'2, 190) – Leakesville, Mississippi; 89 – Dylan Davis – Redshirt Junior (6'1, 200) – Frisco, Texas; Tight ends: 4 – Caleb Odom – Junior (6'5, 240) – Carrollton, Georgia (Georgia (U.S. state)); 9 – Luke Hasz – Senior (6'2, 240) – Bixby, Oklahoma; 42 – Jack Harper – Redshirt Sophomore (6'4, 245) – Oxford, Mississippi; 80 – Hayden Bradley – Redshirt Freshman (6'4, 245) – Buford, Georgia (Georgia (U.S. state)); 82 – Michael Smith – Sophomore (6'4, 260) – Savannah, Georgia (Georgia (U.S. state)); 86 – Brady Prieskorn – Sophomore (6'5, 245) – Lake Orion, Michigan; 87 – Wyatt Smalley – Junior (6'2, 220) – Milton, Georgia (Georgia (U.S. state)); Kicker/Punter: 17 – Lucas Carneiro – Senior (5'11, 195) – Cornelius, North Carolina; 33 – Oscar Bird – Sophomore (6'4, 220) – Sydney, Australia; 47 – Stephon Weise – Freshman (6'1, 195) – Chandler, Arizona; Long snappers: 44 – Caleb Blankenship – Redshirt Sophomore (6'2, 240) – Ashdown, Arkansas; 83 – Sean Judge – Redshirt Sophomore (6'4, 235) – Attleboro, Massachusetts	Offensive Lineman: 50 – Troy Everett – Senior (6'3, 315) – Roanoke, Virginia; 51 – Delano Townsend – Junior (6'4, 330) – Flint, Michigan; 52 – Cooper Johnson – Redshirt Sophomore (6'6, 330) – Lincoln, Nebraska; 53 – Trey Nightingale – Redshirt Sophomore (6'0, 265) – Wyckoff, New Jersey; 55 – Terez Davis – Redshirt Sophomore (6'4, 300) – Hyattsville, Maryland; 56 – Mason Waddle – Redshirt Freshman (5'11, 250) – Tupelo, Mississippi; 57 – Carius Curne – Sophomore (6'5, 330) – Hughes, Arkansas; 61 – Tommy Kinsler IV – Junior (6'6, 350) – Ocala, Florida; 62 – Brycen Sanders – Junior (6'5, 315) – Chattanooga, Tennessee; 65 – Connor Howes – Sophomore (6'6, 315) – Saint Cloud, Florida; 69 – Joe Koury – Redshirt Sophomore (5'10, 280) – Madison, Mississippi; 70 – Jalan Chapman – Freshman (6'3, 315) – New Orleans, Louisiana; 71 – Emanuel Faulkner – Freshman (6'6, 305) – New Albany, Mississippi; 75 – Patrick Kutas – Senior (6'6, 315) – Memphis, Tennessee; 76 – John Wayne Oliver – Redshirt Sophomore (6'5, 310) – Nashville, Tennessee; 77 – Enoch Wangoy – Sophomore (6'7, 350) – Manchester, England; Defensive Lineman: 1 – Jordan Renaud – Junior (6'3, 265) – Sarasota, Florida; 3 – Blake Purchase – Junior (6'3, 250) – Green Valley Ranch, Colorado; 5 – Kam Franklin – Junior (6'5, 295) – Lake Cormorant, Mississippi; 9 – Jehiem Oatis – Senior (6'5, 340) – Columbia, Mississippi; 15 – Landon Barnes – Freshman (6'3, 250) – Baton Rouge, Louisiana; 17 – Jonathan Maldonado – Senior (6'6, 250) – Monrovia, California; 45 – Talib Graham – Redshirt Freshman (6'1, 250) – Daphne, Alabama; 52 – Will Echoles – Junior (6'3, 315) – Houston, Mississippi; 54 – Tre'Kievion Ellis – Freshman (6'1, 260) – Gallman, Mississippi; 55 – Cam Clark – Redshirt Sophomore (6'2, 255) – Medina, Tennessee; 57 – Paris Evans – Redshirt Sophomore (6'3, 280) – Waynesboro, Mississippi; 88 – Michael Boireau – Junior (6'5, 355) – Atlanta, Georgia (Georgia (U.S. state)); 90 – Jayden Curtis – Freshman (6'3, 275) – Perkinston, Mississippi; 95 – Andrew Maddox – Redshirt Freshman (6'3, 285) – Hattiesburg, Mississippi; 96 – Jamarious Brown – Junior (6'2, 315) – Moss Point, Mississippi; 97 – Kamron Beavers – Redshirt Sophomore (6'3, 300) – Bay Springs, Mississippi; 99 – Carmelow Reed – Freshman (6'6, 275) – Chicago, Illinois	Linebackers: 4 – Suntarine Perkins – Senior (6'2, 220) – Raleigh, Mississippi; 11 – Keaton Thomas – Senior (6'1, 240) – Jacksonville, Florida; 12 – Luke Ferrelli – Sophomore (6', 230) – San Diego, California; 22 – Raymond Collins – Redshirt Senior (6'2, 235) – Gulfport, Mississippi; 23 – Jarcoby Hopson – Redshirt Freshman (6'2, 250) – Tunica, Mississippi; 26 – Ant Davis – Freshman (6'1, 220) – Decatur, Georgia (Georgia (U.S. state)); 30 – Ja'Michael Garrett – Freshman (6'2, 200) – Baton Rouge, Louisiana; 42 – Bryson Walters – Redshirt Freshman (6'2, 240) – Fulton, Mississippi; 44 – Tony Mitchell – Senior (6'1, 240) – Alabaster, Alabama; 48 – Mark Trigg Jr. – Junior (6'1, 200) – Roswell, Georgia (Georgia (U.S. state)); 49 – Tah'j Butler – Junior (6'1, 235) – New Orleans, Louisiana; 53 – Ford Beeker – Redshirt Freshman (5'11, 215) – Tuscaloosa, Alabama; Defensive backs: 0 – Jalyn Crawford – Junior (6'0, 180) – Atlanta, Georgia (Georgia (U.S. state)); 2 – Jaylon Braxton – Junior (6'0, 190) – Frisco, Texas; 6 – Joenel Augero – Senior (5'11, 200) – Lynn, Massachusetts; 7 – Sharif Denson – Senior (5'11, 195) – Jacksonville, Florida; 8 – Antonio Kite – Senior (6'0, 190) – Anniston, Alabama; 13 – Cedrick Beavers – Redshirt Senior (5'11, 185) – Taylorsville, Mississippi; 14 – Edwin Joseph – Junior (6'0, 195) – Tamarac, Florida; 16 – Dorian Barney – Freshman (6'0, 185) – Carrollton, Georgia (Georgia (U.S. state)); 19 – MJ Preston – Redshirt Freshman (6'0, 180) – Petersburg, Virginia; 20 – Anthony Robinson III – Redshirt Sophomore (6'0, 200) – St. Rose, Louisiana; 21 – Tavoy Feagin – Redshirt Sophomore (6'0, 170) – Tampa, Florida; 24 – Andy Jaffe – Junior (6'1, 195) – Tampa, Florida; 25 – Maison Dunn – Redshirt Freshman (6'2, 185) – Tupelo, Mississippi; 27 – Pat Broomfield – Redshirt Sophomore (6'1, 165) – Clarksdale, Mississippi; 28 – Dante Core – Redshirt Freshman (5'11, 170) – Fort Walton Beach, Florida; 29 – Nick Cull – Senior (5'11, 180) – Donalsonville, Georgia (Georgia (U.S. state)); 31 – Ladarian Clardy – Sophomore (5'11, 190) – Pensacola, Florida; 32 – Victor Lincoln Jr. – Freshman (5'11, 170) – Lancaster, Texas; 34 – Iverson McCoy – Freshman (5'11, 185) – Atlanta, Georgia (Georgia (U.S. state)); 35 – Craig Tutt – Freshman (5'10, 190) – Christiana, Tennessee; 36 – Keon Young – Redshirt Freshman (6'0, 190) – Bartow, Florida; 37 – Cortez Thomas – Redshirt Freshman (6'2, 200) – Lexington, Mississippi; 39 – Gerald Lacy Jr. – Junior (6'0, 185) – Lancaster, Texas; 40 – Micah Stallworth – Redshirt Sophomore (5'11, 200) – Ridgeland, Mississippi; 41 – John Ross Ashley – Junior (5'11, 180) – Vestavia Hills, Alabama; 43 – Israel Solomon – Redshirt Junior (5'9, 175) – Dallas, Texas
Legend: (C) Team captain; (S) Suspended; (I) Ineligible; Injured

=== Transfers ===
==== Outgoing ====
Player	Position	Destination
Corey Amos	EDGE	Grambling State
Mike Baker	K	UConn
Jalen Ballard	K	Troy
TJ Banks	S	Louisville
TJ Dottery	LB	LSU
Ethan Fields	IOL	Alabama
Ricky Fletcher	CB	California
Jude Foster	IOL	Liberty
Chris Graves Jr.	CB	Missouri
Trey Hall	RB	Old Dominion
Devin Harper	IOL	LSU
TJ Hedrick	OT	Auburn
DeeJay Holmes Jr.	EDGE	FIU
Cayden Lee	WR	Missouri
Anthony Robinson III	S	Withdrawn
Jeffery Rush	EDGE	Southern Miss
Austin Simmons	QB	Missouri
Domonique Thomas	RB	Samford
Princewill Umanmielen	EDGE	LSU
Braden Waterman	QB	Unknown
Winston Watkins Jr.	WR	LSU
PJ Wilkins	IOL	Wisconsin
Da'Shawn Womack	EDGE	Auburn
Jaden Yates	LB	Houston

==== Incoming ====
Player	Position	Previous School
Joenel Aguero	S	Georgia
Michai Boireau	DL	Florida
Tah'j Butler	LB	Georgia Tech
Johntay Cook	WR	Syracuse
Jalyn Crawford	CB	Auburn
Carius Curne	OT	LSU
Sharif Denson	S	Florida
Joshua Dye	RB	Southern Utah
Troy Everett	IOL	Oklahoma
Luke Ferrelli	LB	California
Horatio Fields	WR	Auburn
Makhi Frazier	RB	Michigan State
Darrell Gill Jr.	WR	Syracuse
Walker Howard	QB	Louisiana
Edwin Joseph	S	Florida State
Tommy Kinsler IV	OT	Miami (FL)
Deuce Knight	QB	Auburn
JT Lindsey	RB	LSU
Jonathan Maldonado	EDGE	Nevada
Cameron Miller	WR	Kentucky
Tony Mitchell	S	Mississippi State
Jehiem Oatis	DL	Colorado
Brady Prieskorn	TE	Michigan
Blake Purchase	EDGE	Oregon
Jordan Renaud	EDGE	Alabama
Michael Smith	TE	South Carolina
Isaiah Spencer	WR	Virginia Tech
Keaton Thomas	LB	Baylor
Enoch Wangoy	OT	Florida
