= Biomuseo =

Science museum in Panama

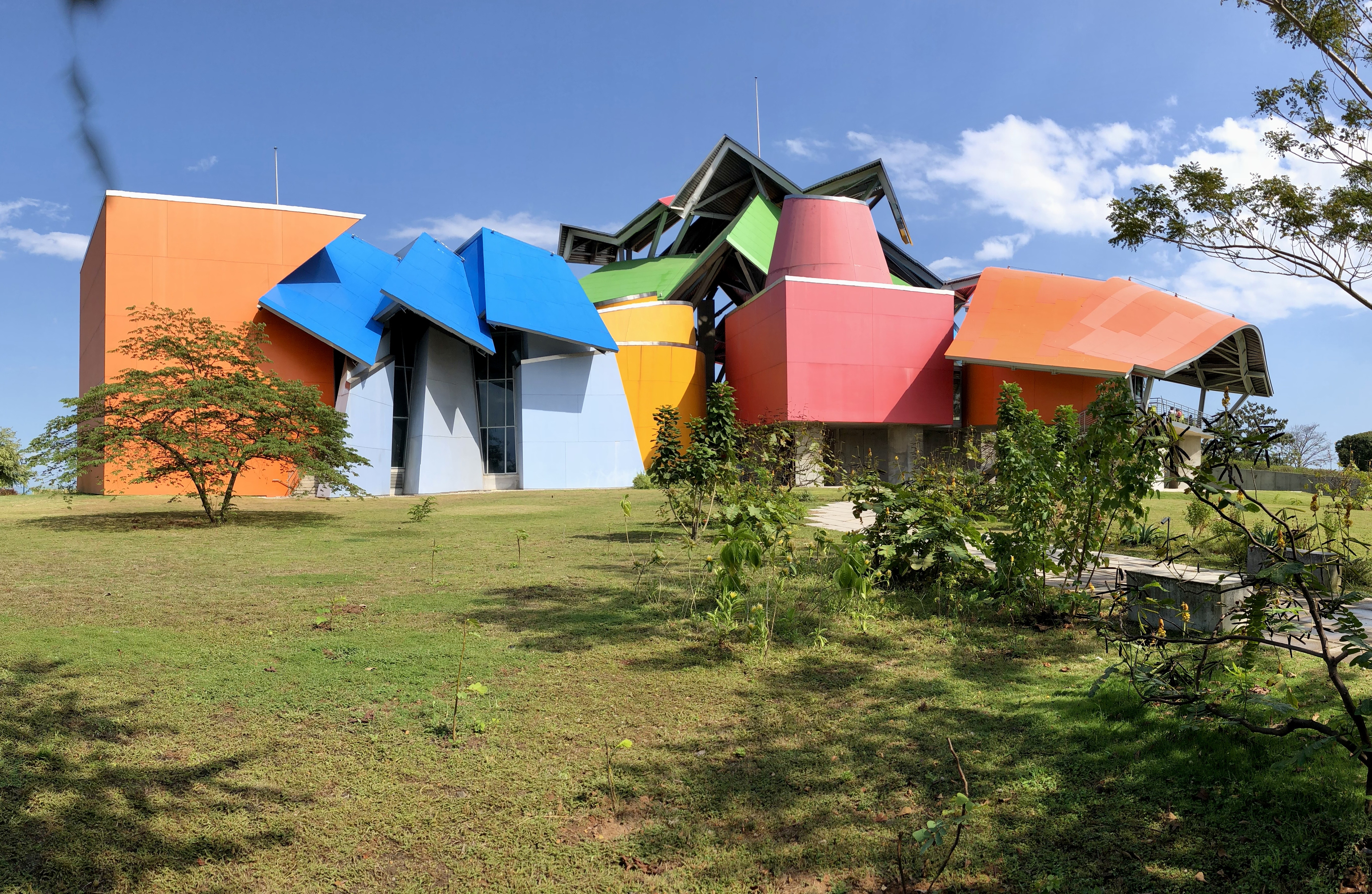
- Established: 2 October 2014; 11 years ago
- Location: Causeway Islands, Panama City, Panama
- Coordinates: 8.9325°N 79.5449°W
- Website: Official website

Biomuseo is a museum focused on the natural history of Panama, whose isthmus was formed very recently in geologic time, with major impact on the ecology of the Western Hemisphere. Located on the Amador Causeway in Panama City, Panama, it was designed by renowned architect Frank Gehry. This is Gehry's first design for Latin America. The design was conceived in 1999 and the museum opened on 2 October 2014.

The Biomuseo highlights Panama's natural and cultural history, emphasizing the role of humans in the 21st century. Its galleries tell the story of how the rise of the isthmus of Panama changed the world.

== Location ==
Biomuseo is located in Amador, also known as Causeway, at the south entrance of the Panama Canal. Visitors can get there via taxi or bus.

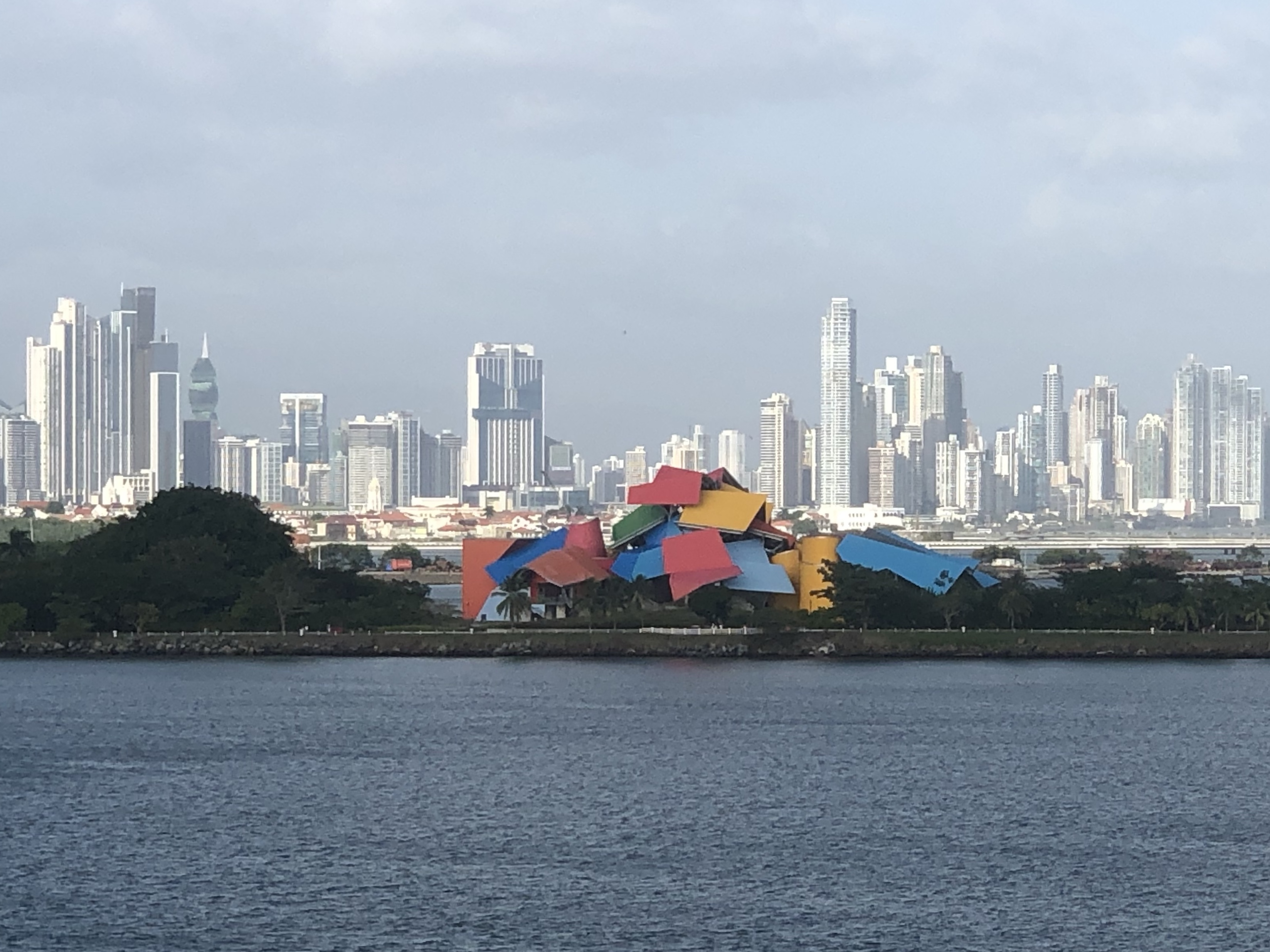
Frank Gehry's Biomuseum viewed from aboard ship close to the south end of the Panama Canal

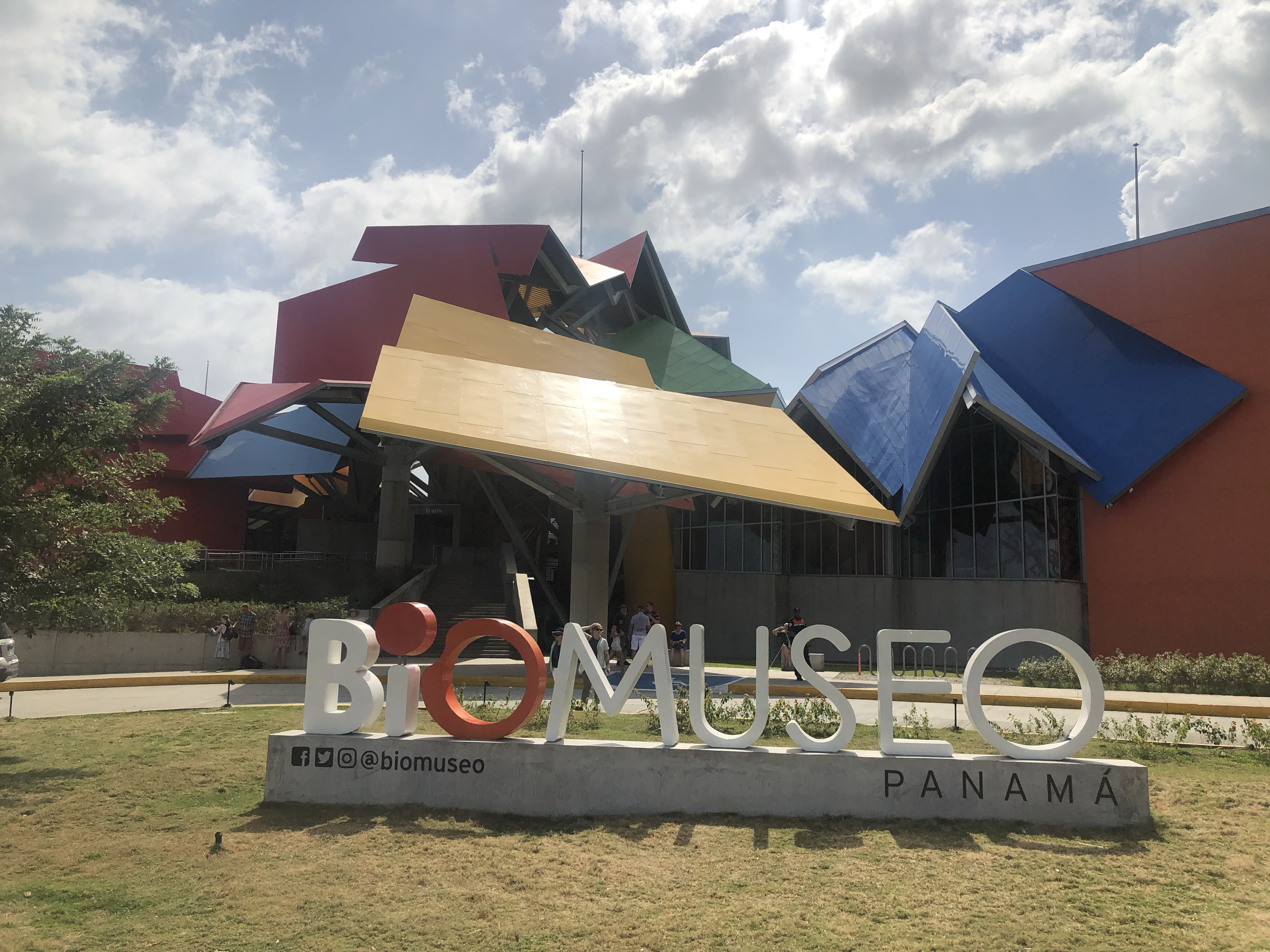
Frank Gehry's Biomuseum

== The building and its galleries ==
With 4,000 square meters, the Biomuseo has eight galleries for its permanent exhibits, designed in sequence by Bruce Mau Design. The museum also has a public atrium, a space for temporary exhibits, a gift store, a coffee shop and exterior exhibits in a botanical garden designed by Edwina von Gal.

On October 2, 2014, the Biomuseo opened the first five galleries to the public, including the Gallery of Biodiversity, an introduction to Panama's natural heritage, Panamarama, a three-level projection space with 10 screens, Building the Bridge, showing the geological formation of the Isthmus of Panama through a hand's on display, Worlds Collide, showing the extraordinary exchange of species between North and South America when the Isthmus closed, and The Human Path, a space partially open to the outdoors, with 16 columns providing information about human impact on the natural world.

The remaining three galleries opened in March 2019. Oceans Divided consists of two semi-cylindrical aquariums showing how the Pacific Ocean and the Caribbean Sea evolved differently after they were separated by the isthmus. The Living Web features a 15-meter living sculpture that combines plants, animals, insects, and microorganisms, giving visitors the experience of the interconnectedness of life. Finally, Panama is the Museum is an immersive and interactive experience showing the relationship between the biological and cultural diversity of Panama, and inviting visitors to experience it first-hand.

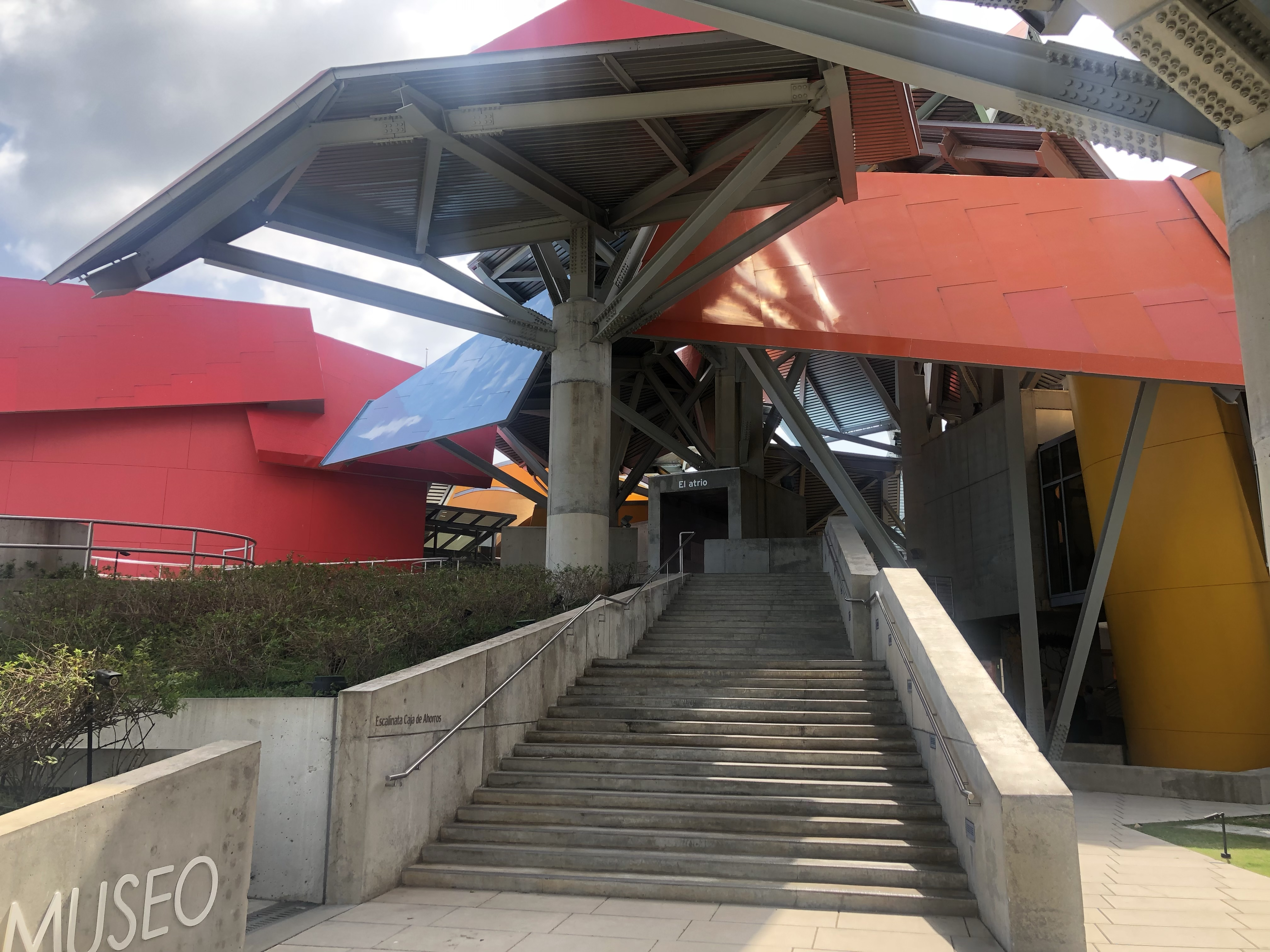
Frank Gehry's Biomuseum entrance

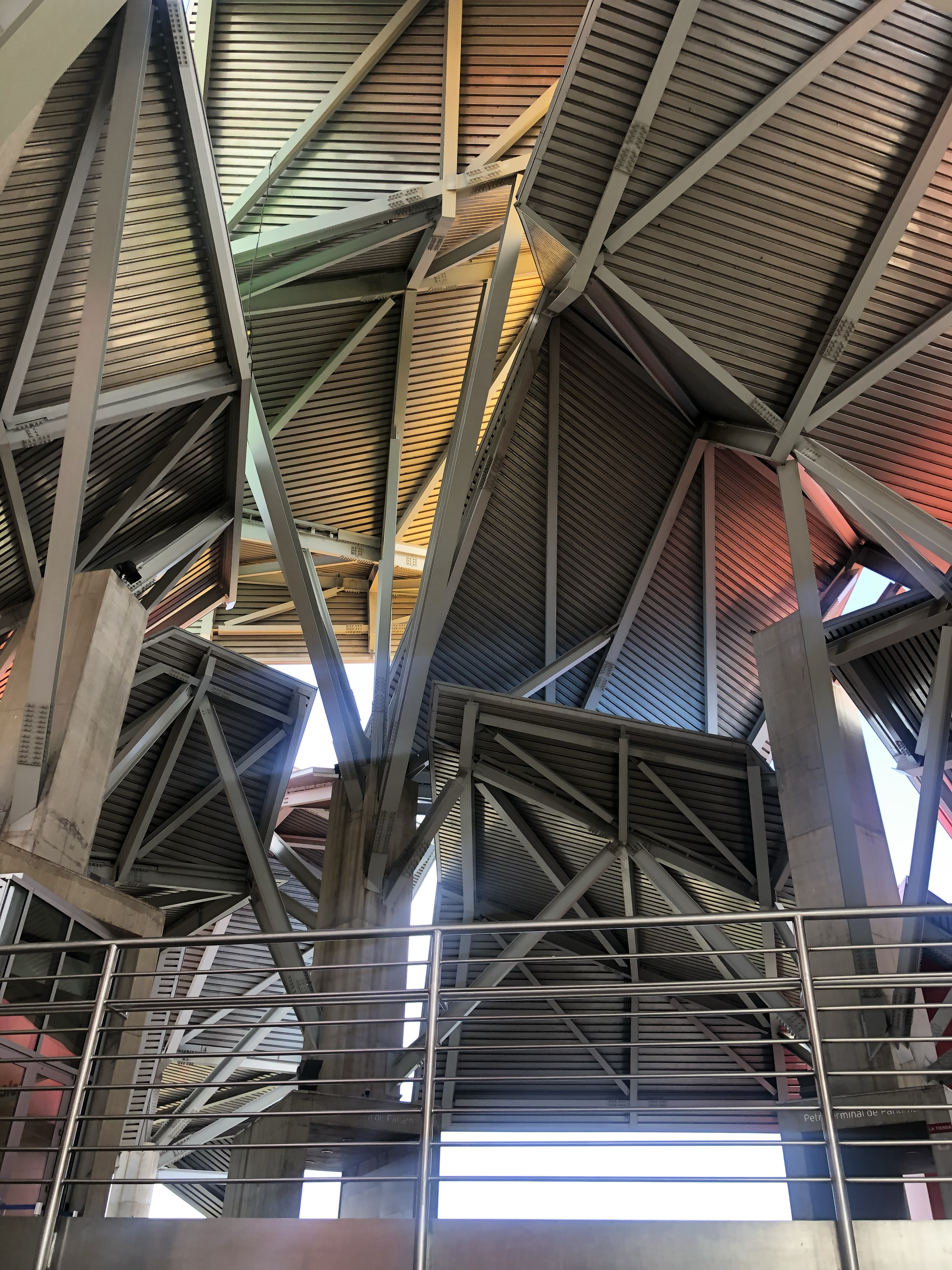
Frank Gehry's Biomuseum interior view

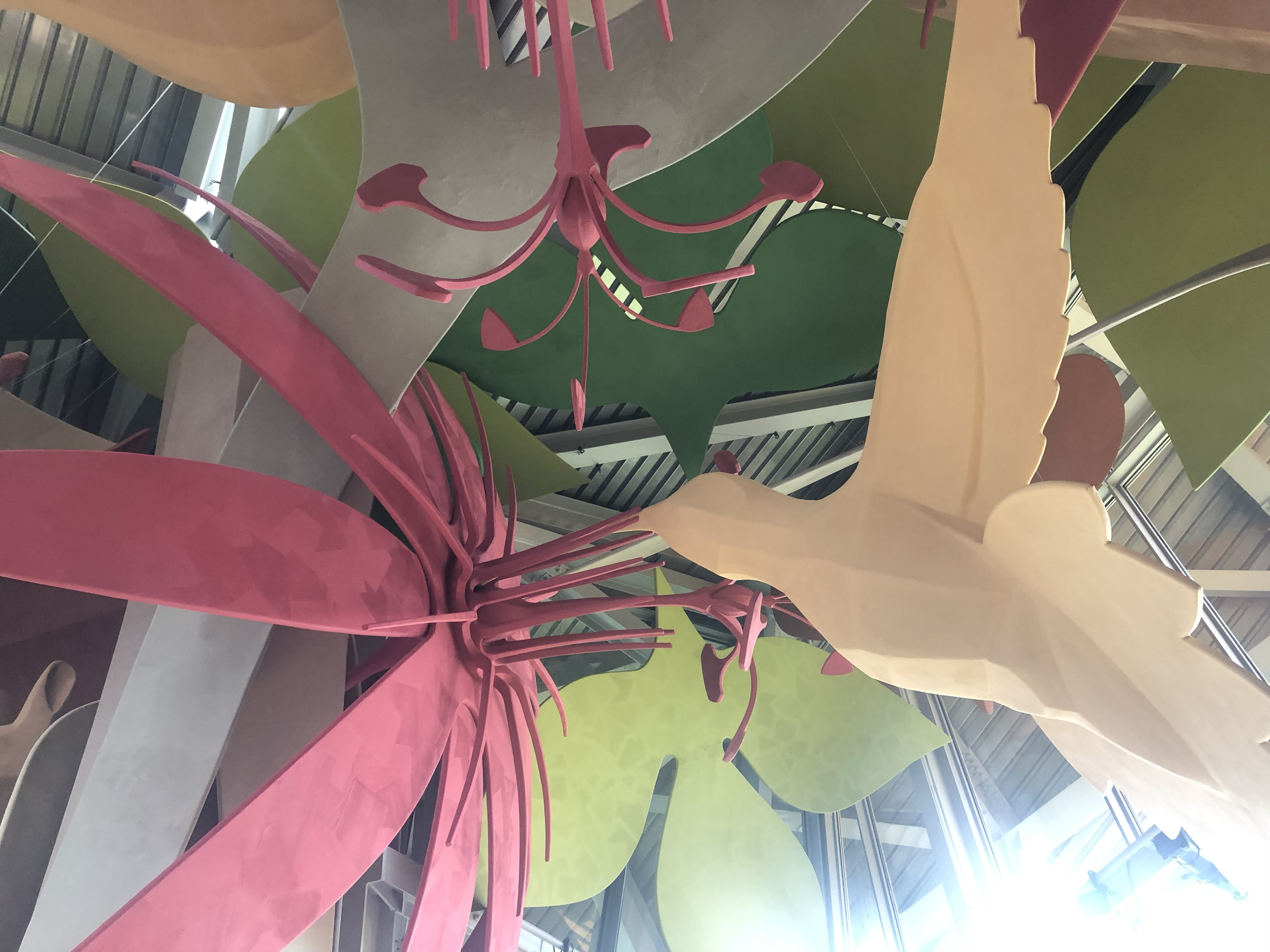
Frank Gehry's Biomuseum hummingbird display

== Social effect ==
The Gehry design is expected to attract tourists and help grow Panama's cultural attractions. The museum may have a similar effect as Gehry's Guggenheim design had for Bilbao, which rejuvenated and placed the city on the map as an important architectural destination. The Biomuseo is the first museum in the world that has committed to teaching the world about biodiversity and its importance. Despite the museum's beautiful architecture the architect wanted to focus on its significance to Panama and its impact on the people who live there. One of the permanent galleries, The Gallery of Biodiversity, goes through the process of explaining what biodiversity is and why it is significant. This gallery is meant to express how important biodiversity is and its significance beyond Panama. The goal of this museum is to make Panamanians, and all those who enter the museum, aware of their personal impact on biodiversity and encouraging people to protect and cherish it.

== See also ==
- List of works by Frank Gehry
