= Audun =

Audun is a Norwegian masculine given name. Notable people with the name include:

- Audun Boysen (1929–2000), Norwegian middle distance runner
- Audun Endestad (born 1953), Norwegian-born American cross country skier, author and field guide
- Audun Grønvold (1976–2025), Norwegian freestyle skier
- Audun Heimdal (1997–2022), Norwegian orienteer
- Audun Hetland (1920–1998), Norwegian illustrator
- Audun Hugleiksson (1240–1302), Norwegian nobleman at the end of the 13th century
- Audun Kleive (born 1961), Norwegian drummer and percussionist
- Audun Laading (1993–2019), Norwegian bassist and backing vocalist of the indie rock duo Her's
- Audun Lysbakken (born 1977), Norwegian politician for the Socialist Left Party
- Audun Munthe-Kaas Hierman (1892–1975), Norwegian newspaper editor and novelist
- Audun Østerås (born 1947), Norwegian civil servant and politician for the Centre Party
- Audun Tron (born 1945), Norwegian politician for the Labour Party
- Audun Weltzien (born 1983), Norwegian orienteering competitor
- Auðun of the West Fjords, the main character in an Icelandic saga

== See also ==
- Audun-le-Roman, location within Lorraine region, France
- Audun-le-Tiche, location within Lorraine region, France
