= Caleb Cunningham =

American football player (born 2005)

No. 3 – Ole Miss Rebels
- Position: Wide receiver
- Class: Redshirt Freshman

Personal information
- Born: December 30, 2005 (age 20)
- Listed height: 6 ft 1 in (1.85 m)
- Listed weight: 215 lb (98 kg)

Career information
- High school: Choctaw County (Ackerman, Mississippi)
- College: Ole Miss (2025–present)
- Stats at ESPN

Caleb Joe'l Cunningham (born December 30, 2005) is an American college football wide receiver for the Ole Miss Rebels.

== Early life ==
Cunningham was born on December 30, 2005, to Lynn and Bettie Cunningham. He preferred basketball growing up, but said that a coach told him: "All your money's gonna be in football."

Cunningham attended Choctaw County High School in Ackerman, Mississippi, where he played four years of high school football. As a junior, he had 48 receptions for 1,138 yards and 14 touchdowns, breaking the school records for most receptions and receiving yards in a single season. As a senior, Cunningham recorded 43 catches, 877 receiving yards, 123 rushing yards, and 14 total touchdowns. He helped the Chargers compile a 14–1 record and win their first Mississippi High School Activities Association state championship, catching a touchdown pass in a 34–27 win over a Kamario Taylor-led Noxubee County High School in the Class 3A title game. Cunningham was selected to the Mississippi roster for the 38th annual Mississippi/Alabama All-Star Classic (though he did not play due to injury) and was named to the 2024 Clarion Ledger Dandy Dozen. He was also a two-time first-team Class 3A all-state selection by both the Clarion Ledger and the Mississippi Association of Coaches.

Cunningham was a multi-sport athlete at Choctaw County. He scored over 1,500 career points and was named the Starkville Daily News All-Area Basketball Player of the Year as a junior. Cunningham also participated in track and field. He was a Mississippi 2A state qualifier in the triple jump and the long jump as a sophomore.

=== Recruiting ===
Cunningham was rated as a consensus four-star recruit. He was also ranked as a consensus top-60 prospect nationally in the class of 2025. In January 2024, Cunningham reduced the list of his college offers down to his top 12 choices. In June, he narrowed it down to his top six choices: Alabama, Auburn, Florida, Mississippi State, Ole Miss, and Tennessee. On July 13, Cunningham committed to playing college football for the Alabama Crimson Tide. Following Alabama's upset loss to Vanderbilt that season, he said it "really shocked the crap out of [him]". On November 13, Cunningham flipped his commitment to the Ole Miss Rebels, remaining in his home state. He signed with the Rebels the following month.

== College career ==
As a freshman in 2025, Cunningham played three games and had one reception for 19 yards, preserving his redshirt. His season was limited by injuries. Heading into the 2026 season, Cunningham competed for a backup role in a crowded wide receivers group.

== Personal life ==
Cunningham is from Weir, Mississippi.
