= Edwin Walker (disambiguation) =

Edwin Walker (1909–1993) was an American army officer.

Edwin Walker may also refer to:

- Edwin Walker (cricketer) (1909–1964), English cricketer
- Edwin Francis Walker (1872–1956), American researcher
