= Edvīns =

- Gender: Male

Origin
- Region of origin: Latvia

Other names
- Related names: Edvin, Edwin

Edvīns is a Latvian masculine given name.

== Given name ==
- Edvīns Bārda (1900–1947), Latvian footballer and manager
- Edvīns Bietags (1908–1983), Latvian wrestler
- Edvīns Ķeņģis (born 1959), Latvian chess Grandmaster
- Edvīns Ozolinš (born 1939), Soviet Latvian track and field athlete, coach and Olympic medalist
- Edvīns Šnore (born 1974), Latvian film director
- Edvīns Zāģeris (born 1943), Latvian hurdler
