= Shekai Mills-Knight =

Canadian football player (born 2006)

No. 33 – Ole Miss Rebels
- Position: Running back
- Class: Sophomore

Personal information
- Born: February 2, 2006 (age 20)
- Listed height: 6 ft 2 in (1.88 m)
- Listed weight: 220 lb (100 kg)

Career information
- High school: Baylor School (Chattanooga, Tennessee)
- College: Ole Miss (2025–present)
- Stats at ESPN

Shekai Marvin Mills-Knight (born February 2, 2006) is a Canadian college football running back for the Ole Miss Rebels.

== Early life ==
Mills-Knight grew up in Dollard-des-Ormeaux, Quebec, Canada, and began playing football at a young age. At age nine, he was disqualified from playing with his team after being deemed overweight at 111 pounds. He later played for the North Shore Mustangs, helping lead the team to a provincial championship in 2022. Ahead of his junior year of high school, he moved to Chattanooga, Tennessee. After moving to the United States, he attended Baylor School in Chattanooga. In his first season playing American high school football, Mills-Knight rushed for 1,113 yards and 15 touchdowns as a junior. Following his senior season, he was named a Navy High School All-American. Mills-Knight committed to play college football at the University of Mississippi over offers from Alabama and Tennessee.

== College career ==
Mills-Knight played sparingly as a freshman, totaling eight carries for 25 yards. Against Vanderbilt the following season, he recorded four carries for 42 yards and his first career touchdown. Following an injury to Kewan Lacy, he had a breakout performance against Auburn, rushing for a team-high 71 yards and a touchdown on 16 carries.

=== Statistics ===
College statistics
| Season | Team | Games | Rushing | | | |
| Season | Team | GP | Att | Yards | Avg | TD |
|---|---|---|---|---|---|---|
| 2025 | Ole Miss | 3 | 8 | 25 | 3.1 | 0 |
| 2026 | Ole Miss | 7 | 33 | 165 | 5.0 | 3 |
| Career | | 10 | 41 | 190 | 4.6 | 3 |
