= Jalyn Crawford =

American football player (born 2006)

No. 0 – Ole Miss Rebels
- Position: Cornerback
- Class: Junior

Personal information
- Born: January 25, 2006 (age 20)
- Listed height: 6 ft 0 in (1.83 m)
- Listed weight: 180 lb (82 kg)

Career information
- High school: Parkview (Lilburn, Georgia)
- College: Auburn (2024–2025); Ole Miss (2026–present)
- Stats at ESPN

Jalyn "Jay" Maurice Crawford (born January 25, 2006) is an American college football cornerback for the Ole Miss Rebels. He previously played for the Auburn Tigers.

== Early life ==
Crawford attended Parkview High School in Lilburn, Georgia. He was selected to play in the 2024 Under Armour All-American Game. He committed to Auburn University to play college football.

== College career ==
Crawford entered his true freshman year at Auburn in 2024 as a backup before becoming a starter in the fourth game of the season against the Oklahoma Sooners. He recorded his first career interception against the Kentucky Wildcats.
