= Edwin Torres =

Edwin Torres may refer to:

- Edwin Torres (judge) (born 1931), Puerto Rican New York Supreme Court judge and author of crime novels including Carlito's Way
- Edwin Torres (poet) (born 1958), Puerto Rican "Nuyorican Movement" poet
- Edwin Torres (cyclist) (born 1946), Puerto Rican Olympic cyclist
