= Edvin Hevonkoski =

Finnish sculptor (1923–2009)

Edvin Hevonkoski (10 September 1923 in Alavus – 8 September 2009 in Vaasa) was a Finnish sculptor and contemporary artist who lived his later years in Vaasa.

== Background ==
Hevonkoski's occupation was a sheet-metal worker. In 1982 he was idle and decided to start making sculptures out of various scrap. His first work consisted of sculptures of Aleksis Kivi's Seven Brothers. They have since been followed by over two hundred other sculptures of fictional characters as well as famous persons such as president Tarja Halonen. His sculptures are on display at the art park Edvininpolku, a footpath near his home in Asevelikylä in Vaasa.
