= Jase Mathews =

American football player

No. 88 – Ole Miss Rebels
- Position: Wide receiver
- Class: Freshman

Personal information
- Listed height: 6 ft 2 in (1.88 m)
- Listed weight: 190 lb (86 kg)

Career information
- High school: Greene County (Leakesville, Mississippi)
- College: Ole Miss (2026–present)

Jase Mathews is an American college football wide receiver for the Ole Miss Rebels.

== College career ==
=== Recruiting ===
Mathews committed to Auburn University in August 2025. After Auburn announced that they had hired Alex Golesh as their new head coach, Mathews stated that he did not know much about the hire. He first met with Golesh in late November. The Ole Miss Rebels began working to flip his commitment away from Auburn.
