= Audun-le-Roman =

- Commune
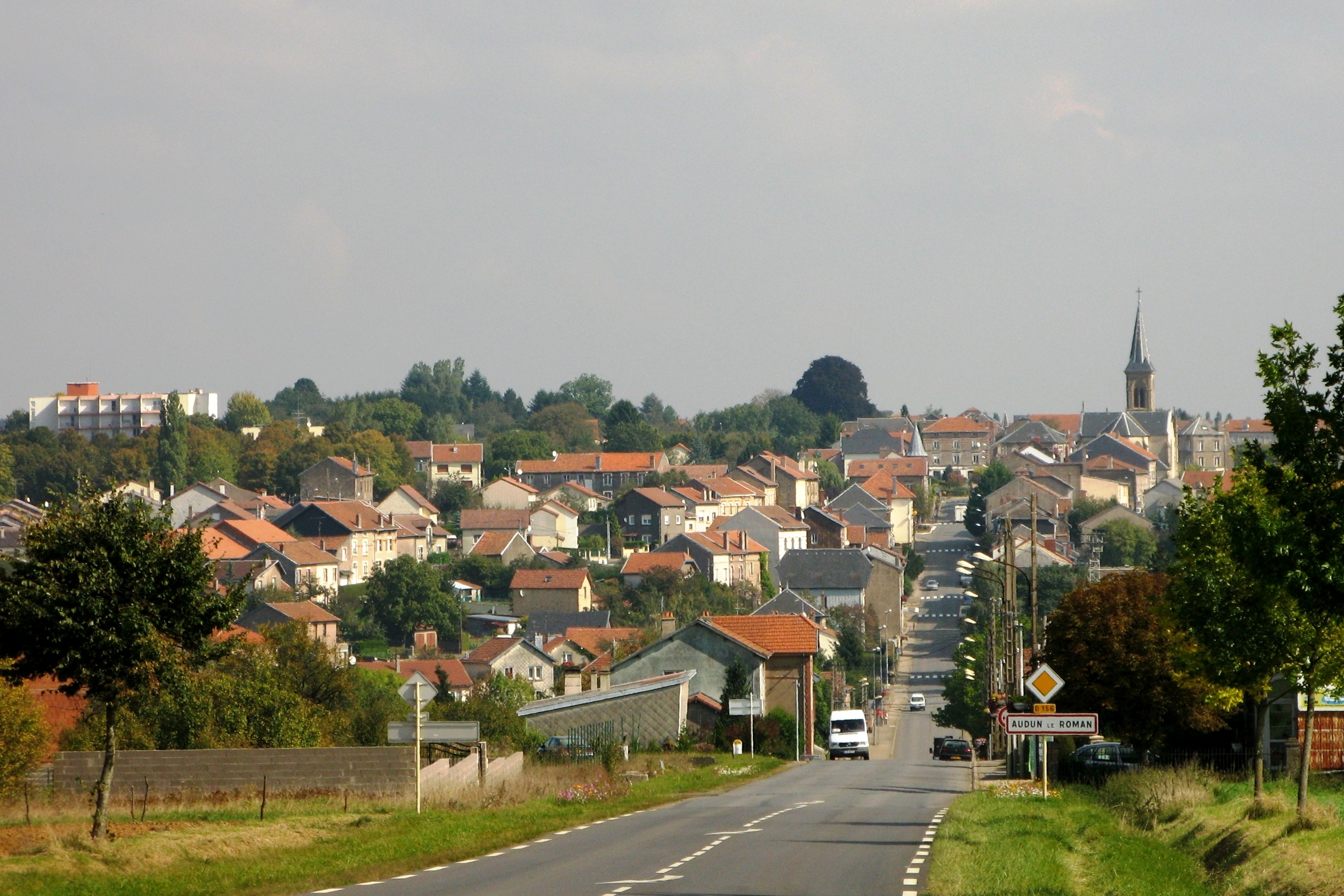
- A general view of Audun-le-Roman

- Coat of arms
- Location of Audun-le-Roman
- Location within France Location within Grand Est
- Coordinates: 49°22′16″N 5°53′48″E
- Country: France
- Region: Grand Est
- Department: Meurthe-et-Moselle
- Arrondissement: Val-de-Briey
- Canton: Pays de Briey
- Intercommunality: Cœur du Pays-Haut

Government
  - Mayor (2020–2026): René Thiry
- Area^{1}: 7.57 km^{2} (2.92 sq mi)
- Elevation: 361 m (1,184 ft)
- Highest elevation: 396 m (1,299 ft)
- Lowest elevation: 320 m (1,050 ft)
- Population (2023): 2,483
  - Density: 328/km^{2} (850/sq mi)
- Time zone: UTC+01:00 (CET)
  - Summer (DST): UTC+02:00 (CEST)
- INSEE/Postal code: 54029 /54560
- ^{1} French Land Register data, which excludes lakes, ponds, glaciers > 1 km^{2} (0.386 sq mi or 247 acres) and river estuaries.

Audun-le-Roman (French pronunciation: [odɛ̃ lə ʁɔmɑ̃]; Lorrain: Audeu; German: Welsch-Oth) is a commune in the Meurthe-et-Moselle department in northeastern France.

== Population ==
Historical population

Year	Pop.	±% p.a.
1793	274	—
1821	357	+0.95%
1841	478	+1.47%
1872	553	+0.47%
1901	529	−0.15%
1926	2,196	+5.86%
1946	2,641	+0.93%
1962	2,848	+0.47%
1968	2,421	−2.67%

Year	Pop.	±% p.a.
1975	2,102	−2.00%
1982	2,106	+0.03%
1990	2,121	+0.09%
1999	2,059	−0.33%
2007	2,403	+1.95%
2012	2,432	+0.24%
2017	2,462	+0.25%
2023	2,483	+0.14%

Source: EHESS and INSEE (1968-2023)

== See also ==
- Communes of the Meurthe-et-Moselle department
