= Edwina McGrail =

Welsh artist (born 1950)

- Born: 1950 (age 75–76); Wrexham, Wales
- Education: Cheltenham College of Art and Design; Birmingham College of Art and Design; Royal Forest of Dean College
- Known for: Painting, poetry

Edwina McGrail (born 1950) is a Welsh artist and poet. In both her paintings and poetry, McGrail references Celtic mythology, images and traditional patterns.

== Biography ==
McGrail was born in Wrexham in north Wales and attended the Cheltenham College of Art and Design during 1967 and 1968 before studying at the Birmingham College of Art and Design until 1971. She completed her studies at the Royal Forest of Dean College throughout 1975 and 1976. From 1976 McGrail participated in a number of group exhibitions, including a 1979 Welsh Arts Council touring exhibition of work by young artists and, also in 1979, a joint show with David Nash and Ken Nathan at Blaenau Ffestiniog. Solo exhibitions in Ireland, at Mitcheldean in Gloucestershire and at Machynlleth followed. A solo exhibition, Through the Eye of the Morrigan, was held at the National Library of Wales during 2001 while a further exhibition of her work was taking place in Istanbul. An illustrated anthology of her poetry, Celtic Madness was published in 1996. McGrail is a resident of Dolgellau in Gwynedd.
