= Edwin Francis Walker =

American archaeologist & researcher (1872-1956)

- Born: December 13, 1872; Chicago, Illinois, United States
- Died: December 3, 1956 (aged 83); Los Angeles, California, United States
- Education: Evanston High School, Illinois
- Occupations: Archaeologist, curator & researcher
- Spouse: Harriet Howe Fitch (m. 1900)
- Children: 2
- Parents: Francis Horton Walker (father); Marilla Antoinette Metcalf (mother)

Edwin Francis Walker (13 December 1872 – 3 December 1956) was a research assistant at the Southwest Museum in Los Angeles and later one of its most prolific investigators. Walker was a late bloomer as an archaeologist, launching this 22-year career when he was in his sixties, after long stints in garment retail and real estate.

== Early life ==
Edwin, known as Ned, was the son of Francis Horton Walker and Marilla Antoinette Metcalf, he a real estate and publishing man, she a nurse, and both from old New England families. Marilla's father, Mason Jerome Metcalf, was a Boston inventor of some note. The couple moved to Evanston, Ill. in 1870. Edwin was born two years later in Chicago.

In 1890, Edwin Francis Walker graduated from high school in Evanston. Five years later, by his own account, he set out from Albuquerque, N.M., to mine gold in the territories with three other men. Later, his childhood friend, Royce Armstrong, staked him and joined him in a 2,000-mile trek around the Southwest during which they mined for gold, explored ancient ruins, and had other adventures. For this trip, Walker may have drawn inspiration from Charles F. Lummis, who himself embarked on a walk or "tramp" from Cincinnati to Los Angeles in 1884–85, to assume an editor's post at the Los Angeles Times. Walker's own adventure produced no gold, but it did result in a later manuscript, 1600 Mile Trip by Burro – Albuquerque to Los Angeles, 1895–1896, written in 1938 but not published until 1985, by the Tucson Corral of the Westerners. Edwin dedicated the tome to his two sons, Edwin Francis Jr. and Winslow Metcalf, whom he addresses in a long dedication that begins: "Here are the Western stories you listened to so respectfully, and so often, from the time you were able to sit up and take notice."

== Retail career ==
About 1900, Walker began his first job, as a clerk at the Chase & Sanborn Coffee Co. in Chicago. That same year, he married Harriet Howe Fitch. Their two sons followed shortly: Winslow was born in 1903, and Edwin Jr. in 1908. By 1910, Walker had moved from coffee to clothing as a manager for Chicago-based Marshall Field & Company. Later, he became a manager for Sears, Roebuck and Co. In the early 1920s, he accepted an offer from Los Angeles-based Bullock's and moved the family out West.

== Real estate and pottery business ==
In 1926, Walker left retail for real estate, managing sales of lots for Frank Putnam Flint, the former federal prosecutor and U.S. Senator, at the new subdivision named after him, Flintridge. At the same time, Walker was involved in another business venture, a pottery factory called International Clay Products, Inc., of Alhambra, which manufactured pottery and tiles using traditional methods. But the factory went bankrupt during the 1929 stock market crash that launched the Great Depression. The real estate business also had dried up, and Walker, 57, was getting close to what today is considered retirement age.

== Archeology ==
In 1934, Walker began his most important work, as a research assistant at the Southwest Museum, which Lummis had founded. It isn't known if the two men ever met before Lummis died in 1928.

The director of the museum at the time was Walker's sometime neighbor, Frederick Webb Hodge. For 22 years, Walker was a main investigator for the museum. He was a pioneer in the specialty known as salvage archaeology, which studied archaeological sites uncovered by construction crews working on commercial or residential developments. The discipline required a sharp eye and an ability to work quickly to allow the construction projects eventually to proceed.

Walker published several works on his finds. His most notable was a 1952 monograph entitled Five Prehistoric Archeological Sites in Los Angeles County, California. It describes five important southern California archaeological sites excavated from 1936 to 1945. Though they helped improve scholars' understanding of California Native American groups, none of the sites exist today except in the literature, as the construction projects paved or built over them. Walker's monograph was reviewed by Malcolm Farmer in the October 1952 edition of the journal American Antiquity.

Walker died at his Flintridge home on December 3, 1956, just months after retiring from his job at the museum.

== Walker's major published works ==
1936

- "A Ceremonial Site at Porter Ranch, San Fernando". The Masterkey. 10 (3): 98–104. May 1936.

1937

- "Indians of Southern California, Part I". The Masterkey. 11 (6): 189–194. November 1937.
- "Sequence of Prehistoric Material Culture at Malaga Cove". The Masterkey. 11 (6): 210–214. November 1937.

1938

- "Indians of Southern California, Part II". The Masterkey. 12 (1): 24–29. January 1938.
- Indians of Southern California; The Pasadenan: official publication of the Pasadena Municipal Employees’ Assn., December 1938-January 1939. Pasadena, Calif.: The Pasadenan, 1938–1939. [10] p. :ill.; 30 cm. EPH.970.33.118
- "Desert Indian Wells". The Masterkey. 12 (3): 110–112. May 1938.

1939

- "A Cemetery of Prehistoric Indians in Pasadena". The Masterkey. 13 (1): 5–8. January 1939.
- "Prehistoric Mortuary Cairns at Chatsworth, California". The Masterkey. 13 (4): 131–135. January 1939.

1940

- Indians of Southern California; Southwest Museum Pamphlet No. 10, softbound pamphlet 12mo. 9 b/w illus. 16 pages.

1941

- "Finding an Old Paiute Mush Basket". The Masterkey. 15 (1): 10–12. January 1941.

1943

- "World Crops Derived from the Indians". The Masterkey. 17 (4): 143–149. July 1943.
- "World Crops Derived from the Indians (II)". The Masterkey. 17 (5): 179–188. September 1943.(these two articles also published as Southwest Museum Pamphlet No. 17, 7.75" X 5”. 16 pages, 1967)
- "Indians of Southern California". The Masterkey. 17 (6): 201–216. November 1943.

1945

- "America's Indian Background". The Masterkey. 19 (1): 7–13. January 1945.
- "America's Indian Background (II)". The Masterkey. 19 (3): 83–89. May 1945.
- "America's Indian Background (III)". The Masterkey. 19 (4): 119–123. July 1945.(these three articles also published as Southwest Museum Pamphlet No. 18, softbound 7.50" x 5", 19 pages, n.d.)

1947

- "Excavation of a Yokuts Indian Cemetery, Elk Hills, Kern County, California". Kern County Historical Society. Coyote Press facsimile reprint (1317). 1947.

1948

- "League of the Iroquois, the Inspiration for the United States of America". The Masterkey. 22 (4): 135–137. July 1948.

1949

- "Slavery of Indians as Instituted by Columbus". The Masterkey. 23 (1): 15–17. January 1949.
- "The Notable Treaty with the Navaho". The Masterkey. 23 (5): 137–143. September 1949.

1952

- Walker, Edwin Francis (1952). Five Prehistoric Archeological Sites in Los Angeles County, California. Los Angeles: Southwest Museum. p. 14. ISBN 0-916561-21-6. 570.6 Fr P v.6.

1985

- Walker, Edwin Francis (1985). "1600 Mile Trip by Burro: Albuquerque to Los Angeles, 1895–1896". The Smoke Signal (45 and 46).
