= Edwin Engelhart =

Dutch basketball player (born 1976)

Edwin Engelhart (born 18 February 1976) is a former Dutch professional basketball player who last played for Zorg en Zekerheid Leiden in the Dutch Basketball League during the 2006-2007 season.
