= Edvin Karlsson =

Swedish politician

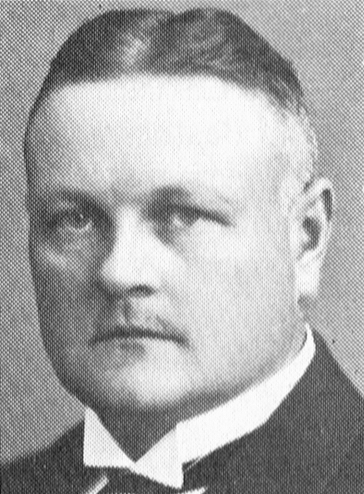
Edvin Karlsson SPA

Karl Edvin Karlsson (4 September 1883 – 28 April 1932) was a Swedish politician. He was a member of the Centre Party.
