= Edwina Benner =

American politician (1885–1955)

Mayor of Sunnyvale
- In office 1924–1926
- In office 1937–1938

Member of Sunnyvale City Council
- In office 1920–1948

Personal details
- Born: August 1, 1885
- Died: May 14, 1955 (aged 69)

Edwina Adaha Cochrane Benner (August 1, 1885 – May 14, 1955) was an American politician who served as the mayor of Sunnyvale, California, from 1924 to 1926 and again from 1937 to 1938. She served as councilmember from 1920 until 1948. Commonly described as the first female mayor in California, she was actually the second, after Ellen French Aldrich of Sawtelle, California—though Sawtelle had already been annexed by the city of Los Angeles by the time Benner was appointed mayor.

Benner died on May 14, 1955 in San Jose, California.

== Legacy ==
In 1954, Sunnyvale School District opened the Edwina Benner Intermediate school, named in her honor. In 2017, affordable housing developer MidPen Housing broke ground on a new 66 unit affordable housing project in Sunnyvale, the Edwina Benner Plaza.
