= Audun Østerås =

Norwegian politician

Audun Østerås (born 20 January 1947) is a Norwegian civil servant and politician for the Centre Party.

He took the siv.øk. degree at the Norwegian School of Economics and Business Administration in 1972. He then worked as a high school teacher and farmer. He was a member of the municipal council of Høylandet Municipality from 1975 to 1983—sitting one four-year term as deputy mayor—and of Nord-Trøndelag county council from 1978 to 1987. From 1987 to 1994 he was the chief administrative officer of Høylandet, and from 1994 he was the chief administrative officer of Nord-Trøndelag County Municipality. He retired in 2008 and was replaced by Inge Fornes.

Østerås has been a board member of Riksteatret and Sparebanken Midt-Norge, and chair of Namdal Folk High School.
