= Edwin Joseph =

American football player (born 2005)

No. 14 – Ole Miss Rebels
- Position: Safety
- Class: Redshirt Junior

Personal information
- Born: June 28, 2005 (age 21)
- Listed height: 6 ft 0 in (1.83 m)
- Listed weight: 195 lb (88 kg)

Career information
- High school: Chaminade–Madonna (Hollywood, Florida)
- College: Florida State (2023–2025); Ole Miss (2026–present)
- Stats at ESPN

Edwin Joseph (born June 28, 2005) is an American football defensive back for the Ole Miss Rebels. He previously played for the Florida State Seminoles.

== Early life ==
Joseph attended Chaminade–Madonna College Preparatory School in Hollywood, Florida. As a senior, he recorded 19 tackles with two being for a loss, nine pass deflections, and two interception on defense, while also hauling in 40 passes for 661 yards and eight touchdowns in 13 games on offense. Coming out of high school, Joseph was rated as a two-way player, where he was rated a three-star recruit and the 29th overall athlete in the class of 2023 by 247Sports. Additionally, Joseph held offers from schools such as Louisville, Auburn, South Carolina, Michigan, and Miami. Ultimately, he committed to play college football for the Florida State Seminoles.

== College career ==
=== Florida State ===
As a freshman in 2023, Joseph totaled one tackle and two pass deflections. In 2024, he notched 13 tackles with three and half being for a loss, a sack and half, two pass deflections, an interception, and a blocked kick in 12 games played. In week 8 of the 2025 season, Joseph recorded five tackles with half a tackle being for a loss and two pass deflections in a loss to Stanford. He finished the season with 37 tackles with three and a half going for a loss, five pass deflections, and three interceptions in 10 starts, after which he entered the transfer portal.
