= Edwina von Gal =

American landscape designer

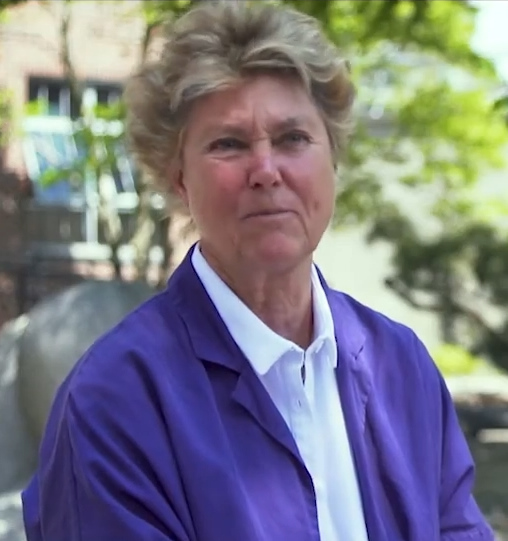
Edwina von Gal in 2018

Edwina von Gal is an American landscape designer based in East Hampton, New York. Her firm, Edwina von Gal + Co founded in 1984, is based in East Hampton, NY and focuses on natural, sustainable designs. She has worked with numerous architects, designers and art world luminaries, among them Maya Lin, Annabelle Selldorf, Richard Gluckman, Richard Meier, Larry Gagosian, Cindy Sherman, David Maupin, Stefano Tonchi, Calvin Klein, and Richard Serra. She designed the park for Panama's Biomuseo, with Frank Gehry. Her approach emphasizes sustainability, natural landscapes, and the use of native species.

In 2008 she founded the Azuero Earth Project in Panama to promote chemical-free reforestation with native trees on the Azuero Peninsula.

In 2013 she founded the Perfect Earth Project to “promote nature-based, toxic-free land care practices for the health of people, their pets, and the planet.” The organization’s key programs are based on its mission, which is to "educate, engage, and inspire individuals, land care professionals, and decision makers to adopt toxic-free, nature-based, and climate-responsible landscaping practices for a healthier, more sustainable—and beautiful—environment for all." She is the founder and board chair.

In 2024, she was named one of the top 50 Creatives in America by Wallpaper magazine, photographed by Inez & Vinoodh.

Her husband Jay Chiat, died in 2002. She has a daughter, Ariel Sheldon, and a grandson, Dylan.

Affiliations:

- Founding member and past president of Metro Hort Group
- Member of the Board "What is Missing?", Maya Lin's environmental media artwork
- Member, Advisory Council, Philip Johnson Glass House

== Awards ==
- Quill and Trowel Award for Garden Writing, 1998
- Institute of Classical Architecture and Art's Arthur Ross Award, 2012
- Decoration and Design Building Stars of Design Award, Landscape Design, 2013
- Guild Hall Lifetime Achievement In the Visual Arts, 2017
- NY School of Interior Design Green Design Award, 2018
- Isamu Noguchi Award, 2018
- Quogue Wildlife Refuge Conservator Award, 2020
- LongHouse Visionary Award from LongHouse Reserve, 2022

== Bibliography ==
- Fresh Cuts Workman Publishing, 1997 ISBN 1885183496
  - Fresh Cuts: Unexpected Arrangements with Branches, Buds, and Blooms. Artisan Books. 2004. ISBN 978-1-57965-266-1.
- The Perfect Yard Handbook, 2016

Articles

- Vogue "A Glorious Riot" Dec 2014
- Architectural Digest"Going Greener" May 2016
- The New York Times Magazine "Zen Rock Garden" Sept 4, 2005 in Design
- Cultured "A Landscape Designer Paints Minimalist Pictures in Plants" Fall, 2015
